= Tapani Rinne =

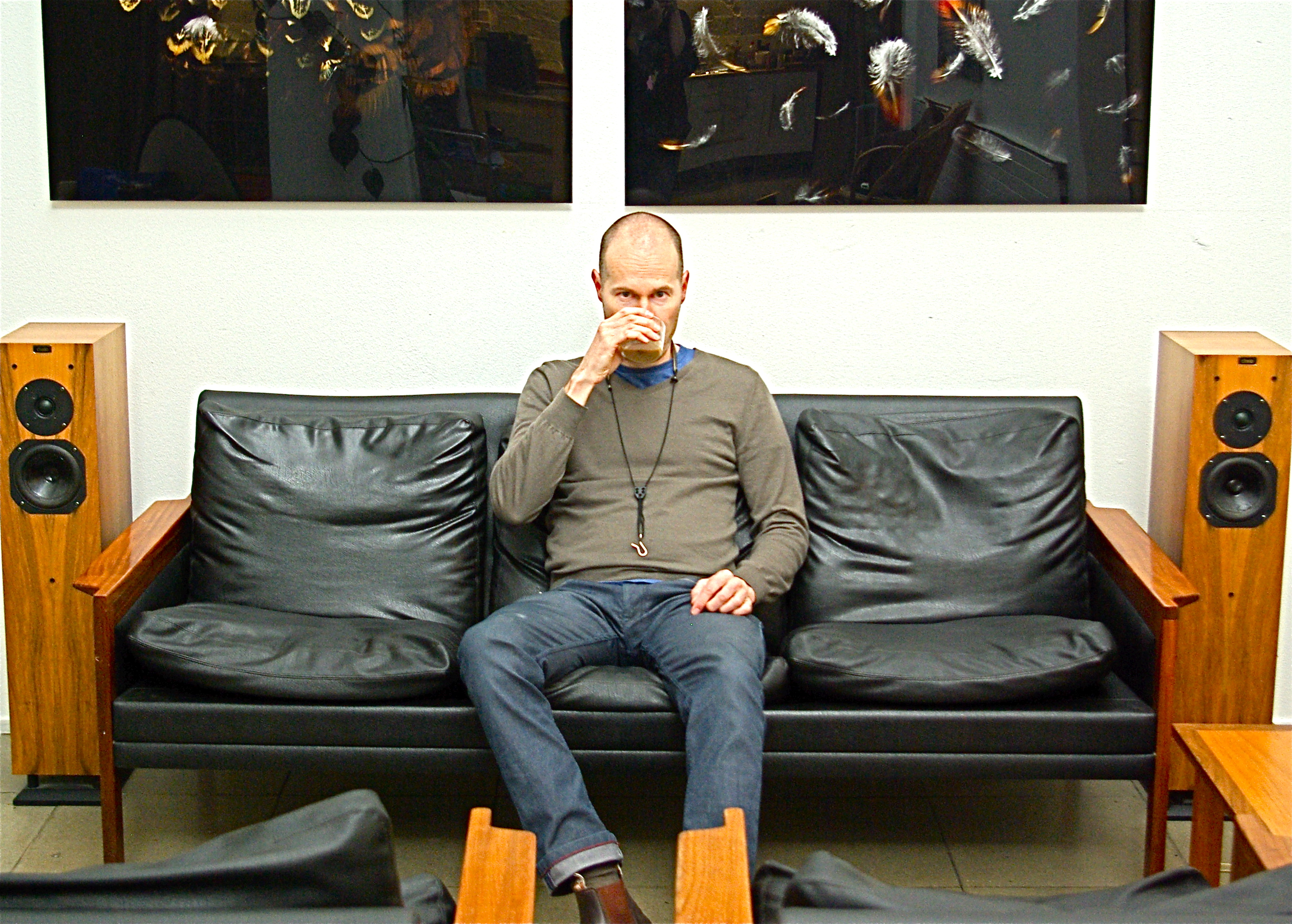

Background information
- Born: 1962 (age 63–64); Pori, Finland
- Genres: ambient, jazz, electronic music, experimental music, contemporary, world music
- Occupations: Musician; composer; record producer; sound designer
- Instruments: Clarinet, saxophone
- Years active: 1981–present
- Labels: Rockadillo Records, Aani Records, Signature Dark
- Member of: RinneRadio, Wimme & Rinne, SlowHill
- Website: www.tapanirinne.com

Tapani Rinne (born February 2, 1962) is a Finnish musician, composer, record producer and sound designer, who is known for his experimental and innovative style with the clarinet and saxophone. It has earned him a reputation as one of the most respected and unique Nordic instrumentalists.

Rinne is most widely recognized as the foreman of the pioneering Finnish electro jazz group RinneRadio, but he has an established solo career with several albums of his own, too. As a record producer he has been also responsible for several albums made together with the Sámi yoik singer Wimme Saari as well as for the albums Kielo (1999) and Kluster (2002) by the experimental accordionist Kimmo Pohjonen. Besides his solo career as a recording artist and numerous other artist collaborations, Rinne has composed music and soundscapes for theater, radio plays, documentaries, films, art exhibitions, contemporary circus shows and dance performances.

Author Petri Silas wrote about Tapani Rinne as a musician the following way in the 5th edition of Finnish Jazz published by Finnish Music Information Centre in 1998: “One of the most successful category-smashers in contemporary jazz, Tapani Rinne has carefully steered his career from one victory to another. His eccentric mix of trad jazz, fragile ambient soundscapes and hard-driving techno, hip hop and drum’n’bass beats in the group RinneRadio has paved the way to stardom both nationally and internationally.”

== Biography ==
=== As a solo artist ===
Tapani Rinne has been an avid student of clarinets and saxophones since the age of eight. He started his musical career in the sax section of the Pori Big Band in 1974 and studied clarinet at the prestigious Sibelius Academy in Helsinki between 1981 and 1986. In the 1980s, Tapani Rinne was playing as one of the members in Edward Vesala Sound & Fury on the album Lumi (1986) as well as in Raoul Björkenheim’s group Krakatau on the album Ritual (1988). He was also developing his talent among the ranks of UMO Jazz Orchestra, Espoo Big Band and the EBU Big Band. During those years Vesala encouraged Rinne to launch a project of his own and thus RinneRadio was born. Vesala was responsible also for the production of RinneRadio's self-titled debut album in 1988.

The solo career as a recording artist started in 1999 with the release of his debut solo album Insider. Tapani Rinne has released four albums since that. Musically they are all ambient-based, while the fourth Radioton album from 2019 was described as a dive directly into the deep layers of minimal ambient creating a breathlike soothing soundscape brainstorming with only a bass clarinet and effect pedals. His fifth album Foghornia was released on Signature Dark label in October 2020 picking up where the previous one left off, said to dig even deeper into melancholic depths of dark ambient music.

=== With RinneRadio ===
RinneRadio is a pioneering Finnish electro jazz group, which Tapani Rinne founded in 1988. They are best known for fusing jazz into ambient music and techno and adding hints of world music into it. RinneRadio has released more than a dozen of albums and performed all over the world.

RinneRadio found success with their unique sound in albums Dance and Visions (1990), Joik (1992), Unik (1994) and Rok (1996), pushing the ever-evolving group into further exploration of new types of music. While the line-up of RinneRadio has changed several times during the years, Tapani Rinne is still the leader and the musical conductor of the group.

=== With Wimme Saari ===
Tapani Rinne has paired with the Sámi yoik singer Wimme Saari on two albums Soabbi (2013) and Human (2017) which they made and released together. Before officially coming out as a duo they had collaborated already on RinneRadio’s albums Dance and Visions (1990), Joik (1992) and Unik (1994), which led Tapani Rinne to produce the first albums Wimme (1995), Gierran (1997) and Cugu (2000) for the Wimme act.

After dropping off from the liaison for a while to focus on RinneRadio, Tapani Rinne returned to produce the Wimme album Mun (2009), which landed them the respected Finnish Teosto prize in 2011 and was another success after the earlier breakthrough albums. Mun peaked on the World Music Charts Europe’s radio charts as the #3 album in May 2010 and reached the Top 20 list on five months during that year.

Since the 2010s, Wimme and Rinne have performed worldwide together as a duo, including shows at WOMEX in Copenhagen in 2011 and in Tampere in 2019. The Songlines magazine called the album Human "a genre-defying tribute to the raw beauty ‒ and occasional madness ‒ of the human condition”. The album drew inspiration from the natural world combining calm beauty, affirmation and a holistic worldview, while the previous album Soabbi was based on religious hymns.

=== With SlowHill ===
SlowHill are a Finnish instrumental downtempo/lounge band, which Rinne formed with the well-known Finnish DJ Slow (aka Vellu Maurola), a former member of the band Pepe Deluxé. The band fuses hip hop and electronic beats into easy listening jazz atmospheres. Their debut album Finndisc was issued by the legendary Blue Note Records in 2002. The second album Fennika was published by Plastinka Records. The third album Muzak was released five years later in 2010. It was issued by Universal Music Finland.

The latest project SlowHillxEGS is a collaboration with the Helsinki-based contemporary artist EGS, known for his global graffiti art and other visual projects. The trio does not perform concerts in the traditional form as their rare appearances are about composing new chill hop sounds while simultaneously creating a work of art. The tracks are inspired by lo-fi hip hop genre, mellow relaxation and elevator music. The aim of the concept album or performance is to create a new kind of live dialogue with live instruments, groovy beats and painterly techniques, which forms a feedback loop of immediate inspiration to give birth to new creations.

=== Other collaborations ===
Outside of RinneRadio, Wimme, SlowHill and his solo albums, reedsman/composer Tapani Rinne has made his mark through close collaborations with several artists, mostly from Finland. In the early days of his career he collaborated with respected jazz musicians such as Edward Vesala and Raoul Björkenheim with guest appearances on each other's albums. Another famous Finnish jazz musician, who worked closely together with Tapani Rinne, was pianist Iro Haarla. She was also part of the original lineup on RinneRadio's debut album.

In the beginning of the 1990s, Tapani Rinne collaborated with another unconventional Finnish saxophonist, internationally acknowledged Jimi Tenor. They ended up doing together album titled Suburban Sax, which was released in 1991.

Collaborations with Finnish multi-instrumentalist and percussionist Teho Majamäki led Tapani Rinne to record experimental albums Inside the Temple in 2012 and Under The Ground in 2015. The first one was recorded inside holy places in India, and the latter in the newly blasted rock tunnels of the railroad built to connect the center of Helsinki to the Vantaa airport. On both albums the artists improvised music inspired by the surroundings, while preserving the physical acoustics and echoes of the exceptional locations. All About Jazz credited Inside The Temple as a five stars album in their review in 2011.

In 2020, Tapani Rinne collaborated with Helsinki-based electronic music artist Aleksi Myllykoski by playing saxophone on the minimalist, melancholic and introspective album Dark Days. Musically the album has been described as ambient and drone-based noir jazz with influences from techno and jungle to experimental music. Aleksi Myllykoski also replaced Konsta “DJ Muffler” Mikkonen in the official lineup of RinneRadio in 2020.

Using the alias TR, Tapani Rinne has collaborated with popular Finnish EDM artist Janji on several tracks, such as “Milky Way Stars” in 2014, which has garnered millions of listens on various stream services.

Since 2016, Rinne has participated as a musician in the innovative and widely covered Classical Trancelations in Concert music concept fusing classical music and rave culture and performing live together with the Helsinki Philharmonic Orchestra and a wide range of popular Finnish music artists on many occasions.

With RinneRadio, Tapani Rinne has collaborated with several artists, including Pan Sonic’s synthetist Mika Vainio and world renowned dance producers such as Jaakko “JS16” Salovaara and Jori Hulkkonen.

Pauli Saastamoinen has been mainly responsible in the studio for the quality control and final sound mastering of recordings by Tapani Rinne during the years. Tapani Rinne has also collaborated with Tuomas Norvio frequently, also after the period when Norvio was officially a member of RinneRadio from 2001 till 2009.

In the 1980s, Tapani Rinne played tenor saxophone in the Finnish band The Bullworkers, which fused many elements from rock to rhythm & blues, jazz and popular music, for some years until founding and focusing on RinneRadio.

=== Production work for other artists ===
Tapani Rinne worked as the musical producer of avantgarde and experimental accordionist Kimmo Pohjonen’s albums Kielo (1999) and Kluster (2002). Kimmo Pohjonen has been granted the accolade of Finnish Folk Musician of the Year in 1996, 1997, 1998 and 1999 in the Finnish Ethnogala and has achieved international success and recognition worldwide.

Rinne's production can also be heard on Finnish folk artist Sanna Kurki-Suonio’s album Huria, where he played as one of the musicians himself as well. The album was released in 2007 by Rockadillo Records.

=== Compositions for films, theater, radio and art exhibitions ===
==== Film music ====
Besides albums, Tapani Rinne has composed a lot of music for numerous films including documentaries, fiction movies and short films. The music for the fiction film Koti-ikävä (2005) was chosen as the representative of Finland for the competition in the international Auxerre Music & Cinema Festival in France. For the same soundtrack, Tapani Rinne and DJ Slow were also nominees in the Finnish Jussi Awards for the best film music of 2005.

Rinne also composed music for the Finnish documentary film Angel of the North, which premiered in 2017 and was directed by the French director Jean Michel Roux. One of his later international assignments was working as a composer for Norwegian dance film Human Habitat 2019. Earlier during his career, Rinne has composed music for documentary film White Terror, which was an international co-production and premiered in 2005.

Wimme & Rinne and RinneRadio were responsible for compositions in the experimental short film Eatnanvuloš lottit (Maan sisällä linnut) by Finnish-Sámi director Marja Helander in 2017. The film was credited with the Risto Jarva Award in 2018. It was screened also at Sundance Film Festival in 2019 and eventually purchased into the collections of Finnish National Gallery.

For television series, Tapani Rinne has worked as the composer for the Nordic co-production Insider in 1999 as well provided theme music by RinneRadio for the series Kylmäverisesti sinun, broadcast in Finland in the beginning of the millennium.

RinneRadio also composed music for the Italian films Atomic! A train of mad Italians in China (Cimap! Cento italiani matti a Pechino) in 2008 and The Missing Piece (Il pezzo mancante) in 2010, both directed by Giovanni Piperno.

Other noteworthy film compositions by Tapani Rinne include documentary films Nokia Mobile: We Were Connecting People (Nokia Mobile: Matkapuhelimen tarina) (2017) directed by Arto Koskinen as well as When Heroes Lie (Sinivalkoinen valhe) (2012) and Pavlov’s Dogs (Pavlovin koirat) (2005) by director Arto Halonen.

==== Incidental music ====
Tapani Rinne has composed incidental music for different performances from theater plays to contemporary circus and dance shows internationally.

Rinne's premiere work as a theater composer was for the drama Frankenstein played in 2013 in the Finnish National Theatre. In 2019, he composed music for a contemporary theater performance named Tie Konyaan there.

Another collaboration with Wimme Saari was to compose the music for the physical and cinematic performance Strømsteder // Sarfartuut in Teater Grob, Copenhagen in 2013. The show was co-produced by the National Theatre of Greenland.

Projects include also incidental music and compositions for contemporary dance performances, such as choreographer Susanna Leinonen's works No One, Just Your Friend in 2000 and Babolat in 2001.

In the 2010s, Tapani Rinne composed and performed music for the Finnish contemporary circus group Circo Aereo’s shows. For example, in Mano he created a multi-faceted sonar landscape for the performance with his clarinet in 2014. Rinne has collaborated also with contemporary music group Defunensemble, when working together with sound designer and musician Tuomas Norvio as the composer for performances such as Concerto Planos in 2016 and electro-acoustic live performance Ko(o)dit Home Codes Gå dit! in 2017.

RinneRadio played live music as the guest stars when Helsinki-based Dance Theater Hurjaruuth performed their Winter Circus show of 2006 in Auditorium Parco della Musica in Rome, Italy.

==== Soundscape design ====
As a sound designer, Tapani Rinne has composed ambient soundscapes based on live instrumentation, many times in collaboration with Tuomas Norvio, for radio plays and programs of Finnish Broadcast Company YLE. Many of these soundscapes were for Radioateljee show, which was broadcast for a period of more than 35 years on YLE radio and produced by Harri Huhtamäki. One of these plays directed by Huhtamäki, Hänen täytyy olla erilainen – Balladi Hallin Jannesta, was announced as the winner in Prix Italia Awards in 2011 for the overall quality among radio documentaries. Rinne has also designed soundscapes for other radio programs, such as Ääniversumi and Radio Variaatio on YLE.

Tapani Rinne has also created and composed soundscapes to art installations. One of these was the environmental art installation with Pia Ilonen, Ilkka Paloniemi and Annina Holmberg titled Kuiskausten puutarha in January 2000 in the Sinebrychoff park in Helsinki. Another one was a collaborative installation Kuula with Ilkka Paloniemi combining light and sound and exhibited on Lux Helsinki light festival in 2014. In 2018, he created the soundscape for Fire Garden installation exhibited for Helsinki Design Week and made together with designer Leena Kouhia and architect Sofie Hagerström. The next year Rinne worked as the sound designer on another installation titled Kotikatu/Uudenmaankatu with Leena Kouhia for HDW.

Collaboration album Under The Ground in 2015 with Teho Majamäki was based on the recordings, which City of Vantaa originally ordered from the duo to be used as the soundscapes inside the new train stations connecting the Helsinki airport to the city by rail.

Rinne's soundscapes have been also heard in several art exhibitions, many of them focusing on photos in particular and including artists such as the Finnish fine art photographer Marja Pirilä.

== Discography ==
=== Solo albums ===
- Insider (1999)
- Nectic (2002)
- Silent Night (2005)
- Radioton (2019)
- Foghornia (2020)

=== With RinneRadio ===
See: RinneRadio

=== With Wimme and Wimme & Rinne ===
- Wimme (Wimme) (1995)
- Gierran (Wimme) (1997)
- Cugu (Wimme) (2000)
- Mun (Wimme) (2009)
- Soabbi (2013) (Wimme Saari & Tapani Rinne)
- Human (2017) (Wimme & Rinne)

=== With SlowHill ===
See: SlowHill

=== With Jimi Tenor ===
- Suburban Sax (1991)

=== With Teho Majamäki ===
- Inside The Temple (2011)
- Under The Ground (2015)

=== With Aleksi Myllykoski ===
- Dark Days (2020)

=== With Pori Big Band ===
- Luhtahuitti (2012)

=== With Tuomas Norvio and Harri Huhtamäki ===
- Mindscape Music (2014)

=== (As sideman...) ===
==== With Edward Vesala ====
- Lumi (ECM, 1986)

==== With Krakatau ====
- Ritual (1988)

== Awards ==
Tapani Rinne has been granted numerous awards for his musical work during the years. Some of the most notable include:

- Teosto Prize of 2011 for compositions and arrangements on Wimme Saari's album Mun
- Prix Italia Awards Winner of 2011 for Hänen täytyy olla erilainen – Balladi Hallin Jannesta for the overall quality among radio documentaries
- Etno-Emma Prize of 2007 in the Finnish Emma Awards for Sanna Kurki-Suonio's album Huria produced by Tapani Rinne
- Pori Jazz Artist of the Year 1996
- Jazz-Emma Prize of 1994 in the Finnish Emma Awards for RinneRadio's album Unik
- Georgie (Yrjö) Award of 1992 for the most distinguished and topical Finnish jazz musician of the year

== Other nominations ==
In 2014, Tapani Rinne was nominated as one of the artistic advisors of Helsinki Festival in the committee founded for years 2014–2017. In 2013, he was also responsible for designing the program of Helsinki Festival's Wunderkammer club event organized in the Helsinki Music Centre.
