= RinneRadio =

Finnish jazz and electronic music band

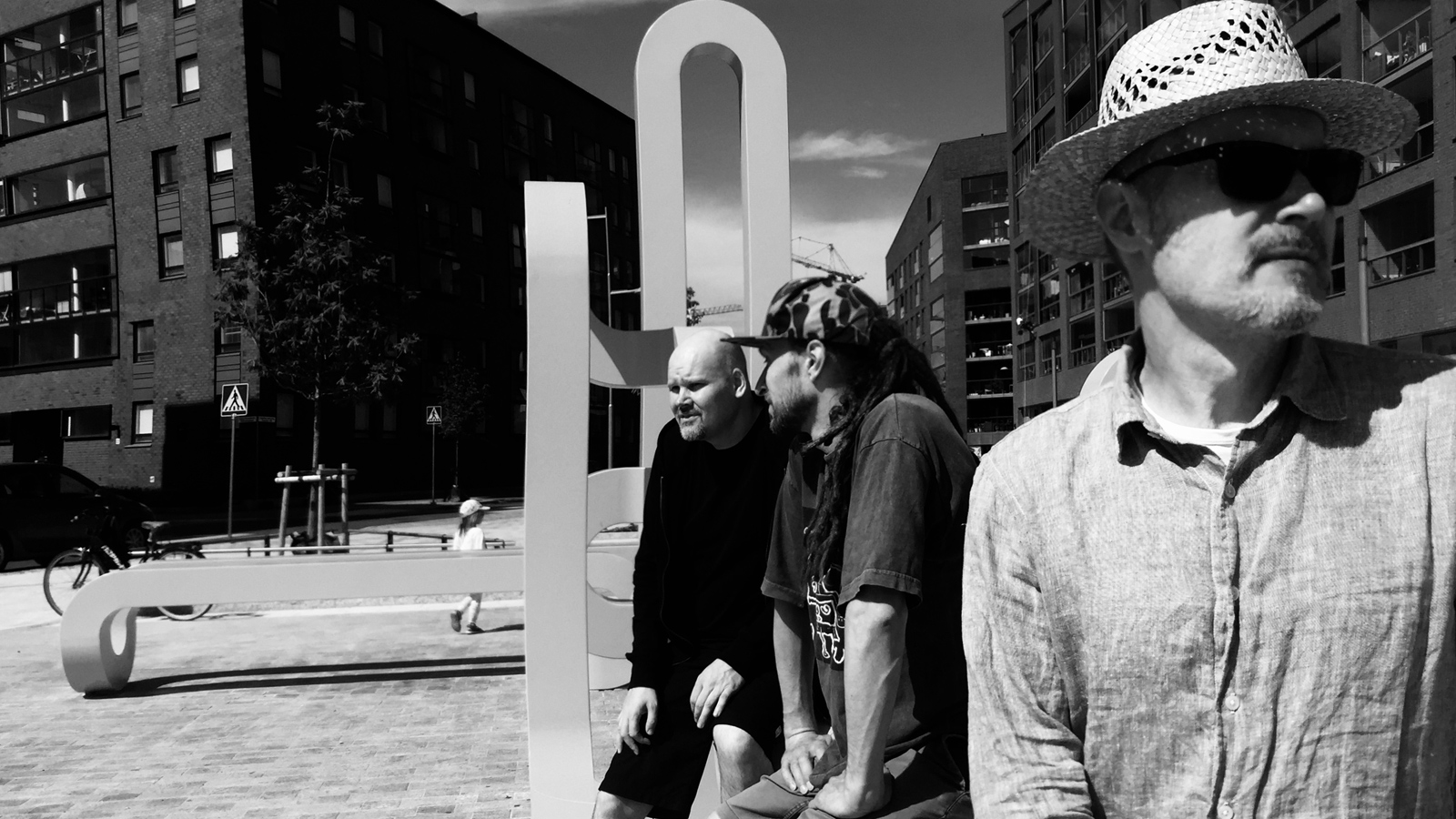
- RinneRadio's official lineup in 2020 (from left to right): Aleksi Myllykoski, Juuso Hannukainen & Tapani Rinne

Background information
- Origin: Helsinki, Finland
- Genres: Nu jazz, electronic, ambient, techno
- Years active: 1988–present
- Labels: Rockadillo Records, The Ambient Zone, Pyramid (Johanna Kustannus), Aani
- Members: Tapani Rinne; Juuso Hannukainen; Aleksi Myllykoski
- Website: www.rinneradio.com

RinneRadio is a Finnish ambient music group founded by Tapani Rinne in 1988. The group is considered to be a pioneer and influence in the sound of multiple genres, with its fusion of jazz, techno, and world music introducing early uses of techniques that would later become global trends.

The biography on the band's website provides the following description of the music they produce: "As the drum'n'bass and techno rhythms are fermented with dark dub, lush ambient soundscapes and timeless saxophone and bass clarinet textures, the resulting brew becomes equally sexy trance jazz and surreal dance music." RinneRadio currently consists of Tapani Rinne (reeds), Aleksi Myllykoski (electronics), and Juuso Hannukainen (percussion).

Author Petri Silas described Tapani Rinne's status as a Finnish musician the following way in the fifth edition of Finnish Jazz published by the Finnish Music Information Centre in 1998: "Forever on the lookout for new horizons, Rinne’s sexy soprano sax and solemn bass clarinet remain among the most original Finnish jazz voices."

== Early history ==
The band was formed in 1988 by saxophone player/reedsman and composer Tapani Rinne, who still leads the band and is the musical conductor. Rinne participated in the composer and drummer Edward Vesala's Sound & Fury workshops in Helsinki, and during these workshops the band started to form.

RinneRadio's eponymous debut album was released in 1988 and it featured a stellar cast of Finland's current jazz elite, including Raoul Björkenheim, Iro Haarla and Seppo Tyni.

The second album Dance and Visions was released in 1990 and the album featured the Sami yoik singer Wimme Saari for the first time in RinneRadio's history. Dance and Visions also introduced Jari Kokkonen as a new member of RinneRadio. He continued in the group until 2001. Dance and Visions established RinneRadio's trademark sound, which they are best known for, fusing electronic music from ambient techno to drum'n'bass and jazzy wind instruments.

RinneRadio's club-friendly sound with strong electronic influence caused stir and confusion in the Finnish jazz scene as well as abroad when the band performed in the beginning. In an interview with Markus Partanen on his book Rytmihäiriöitä ‒ Uuden Suomi-jazzin nousu, Tapani Rinne described their early years: "We probably focused performing too much at jazz and art music venues. Techno scene and clubs were a different thing, but we got into these circles only afterwards after the band had achieved more commercial success."

In 1992 RinneRadio released the album Joik, where another one of Rinne's long-time collaborators, Kimmo Kajasto, appeared for the first time. The same year, Tapani Rinne garnered the Finnish Georgie Award (Yrjö) for Jazz Musician of the Year, given by the Finnish Jazz Federation.

The group's fourth album, Unik, was released in 1994. It followed an EP titled DiorInNera released one year earlier. Unik received one of the highest record industry accolades in Finland, the Jazz Emma Award, which could be called the Finnish equivalent of the Grammy Award. By this time, word had spread about the new concoction of jazz, techno and ambient sounds played by RinneRadio, and the band toured extensively in Belgium, Denmark, Germany, Estonia, Japan, Spain and Sweden.

The band's core group was now Rinne, Kajasto and Kokkonen. The trio continued to develop the sound further particularly on RinneRadio's fifth album RoK (1996) consisting of influences from hip hop, drum and bass and jazz. The same year they won the Golden Pumpeli Award at the Oulu Music Video Festival for the visuals for "Aromaa AltToo".

RoK was the ultimate commercial breakthrough for RinneRadio. It peaked at number 22 in 1996 on the Official Finnish Album Chart and stayed on the chart for six weeks. According to Tapani Rinne, after "being in wrong places at the wrong time so many times earlier", the situation was now the opposite. The big audience was now ready for RinneRadio's music and suddenly they were considered trendsetters, although that was never their aim. The band found new passionate fans especially in the European club music scene, which was driven by the rising deejay culture.

In 1997, RinneRadio released a new album titled pfft, which was a collaboration with Pan Sonic's Mika Vainio, based on an earlier live remix project where Vainio remixed one of RinneRadio's live shows. In 1997, they also played a show at Knitting Factory in New York City from which the audio signal was sent live to Finland and Pori Jazz Festival where DJ Spooky made a live interpretation of the concert for the festival audience.

After this, two more smaller releases, EP's Osaka and Juju, were issued before RinneRadio started to work on a new album, G. The album was released in 1998 and was an important milestone because programmer Kimmo Kajasto had been replaced with DJ Ken-One (aka Jean Johansson) in the lineup.

Their collaborations with various DJ's culminated in the 1999 release B, which features RinneRadio tracks remixed by Finland's top DJs and remixers, including Brothomstates, Jori Hulkkonen, JS16 and Slow.

== 2000 – 2009 ==
Work with Jori Hulkkonen continued, as he was largely responsible for the production of the next RinneRadio album, Nao (2001), along with Veikka Erkola. DJ Ken-One was now replaced by percussionist Zarkus Poussa and later by Abdissa Assefa in live performances. Nao reached number 32 on the Official Finnish Album Chart, making it the group's most commercially successful album after RoK. This was followed by another album, Lumix, in 2003, which included strong efforts by Veikka Erkola and Pauli Saastamoinen. The latter has had a significant role in RinneRadio's sound throughout the years regarding recording, mixing and mastering.

During this time, Verneri Lumi and Juusonik (known also from Don Johnson Big Band) joined the band with Tapani Rinne, and RinneRadio reformed as a trio. Their first joint effort was the new album Pan in 2004. Pan featured again a range of guests, such as Pekka Kuusisto on violin.

In 2005, RinneRadio concentrated on touring and performed at a festival curated by Herbie Hancock at Barbican Arts Centre in London as well as in the Dutch North Sea Jazz Festival. In 2006, they were invited to play at the 40th anniversary opening night of Midem in Cannes. After Midem the band was ready to release their twelfth full-length album, simply called +. The violinist, Pekka Kuusisto, returned on this album as a guest.

In September 2007, RinneRadio released On. It featured Sanni Orasmaa and Icelander Kira Kira on vocals. The following year, the band celebrated their 20th anniversary by releasing a compilation album titled 20, which featured 20 tracks from throughout their career. The tracks were chosen by radio and club DJs who were asked to give a list of tracks of their personal RinneRadio dream album. The result was a double album with tracks categorized into Side A(mbient) and Side B(eat).

In 2009, RinneRadio released again material in the form of the album Pole Stars. Musically, it represented an upgrade to their "ethno techno" with a strong Nordic twist. The album featured artists such as Sámi joik singers Ulla Pirttijärvi and Wimme Saari, Johanna Juhola on accordion and Eva Alkula playing Finnish zither.

== 2010 – present day ==
The next phase of RinneRadio started with Tuomas "Verneri Lumi" Norvio being replaced in the lineup with the Finnish drum'n'bass artist Konsta "DJ Muffler" Mikkonen soon after the release of Pole Stars album. The biggest evolution was the new raw and hard-edged flavour combined with the moody and floating RinneRadio sound. This is also present on their next StaRRk (2012) album, which has been stylistically described as more rugged, sharper and darker than their earlier productions.

The official lineup (including Tapani Rinne and Juuso Hannukainen) stayed the same for several years until 2020, when DJ Muffler was replaced in the line-up by Helsinki-based electronic music artist Aleksi Myllykoski, who had been filling in for him more and more often on live occasions.

Although RinneRadio has been actively performing live both domestically and abroad, they have not released a new album since StaRRk in 2012. All the members of the group have been busy with other projects. For example, group leader Tapani Rinne released his fourth solo album Radioton in 2019, the second collaboration album with Wimme Saari titled Human in 2017 as well as collaboration albums Under The Ground (2015) and Inside The Temple (2012) with Teho Majamäki.

Since 1996, all the official RinneRadio releases had been published by the Finnish record label, Rockadillo Records. However, for the singles they tried something new by reaching their international fans through national airplay in the UK with The Ambient Zone. The London-based label published their latest two singles "Yasmin" in 2017 and "Zarkukselle" in 2018. They then started working on material for their next album, originally scheduled to be released by Rockadillo Records in winter 2020–2021. The album would eventually release as Balladium in 2023.

According to their website: "In 2020, the dynamic trio is known for their invigorating performances of rich and eclectic sound ranging from fervent rumble to wild and transcendent meditative ambiance. Avoiding formats and predictability they do not have a fixed set for their live show. Instead they customize it according to the event and venue, which can nowadays be anything from a church concert to a live club, concert arena or a rave festival organized in the middle of forest."

== Discography ==
=== Albums ===
- RinneRadio (1988)
- Dance And Visions (1990)
- Joik (1992)
- Unik (1994)
- RoK (1996)
- pfft (1997)
- G (1998)
- B (1999)
- Nao (2001)
- Lumix (2003)
- Pan (2004)
- + (2006)
- On (2007)
- Pole Stars (2009)
- StaRRk (2012)
- Balladium (2023)
- 4/4 (2025)

=== EPs ===
- Dior In Nera (1993)
- Joulu (1994)
- Aromaa Alt (1995)
- Osaka (1998)
- Juju (1998)
- Kylmäverisesti sinun (OST) (2016)

=== Singles ===
- "Santa Claus" (1991)
- "Affluenza" (2000)
- "Kuvala" (2002)
- "Yasmin" (2017)
- "Zarkukselle" (2018)
- "Talk" (RinneRadio Remix) (2019) (remix for the song originally performed by Construction)

=== Compilation albums ===
- RinneRadio and Wimme: File Under ‒ Finnish Ambient Techno Chant (1997)
- 20 (2008)
