= Great Stalacpipe Organ =

Organ that uses cave formations to transmit sound

Coordinates: 38°39′51.5″N 78°29′1.7″W

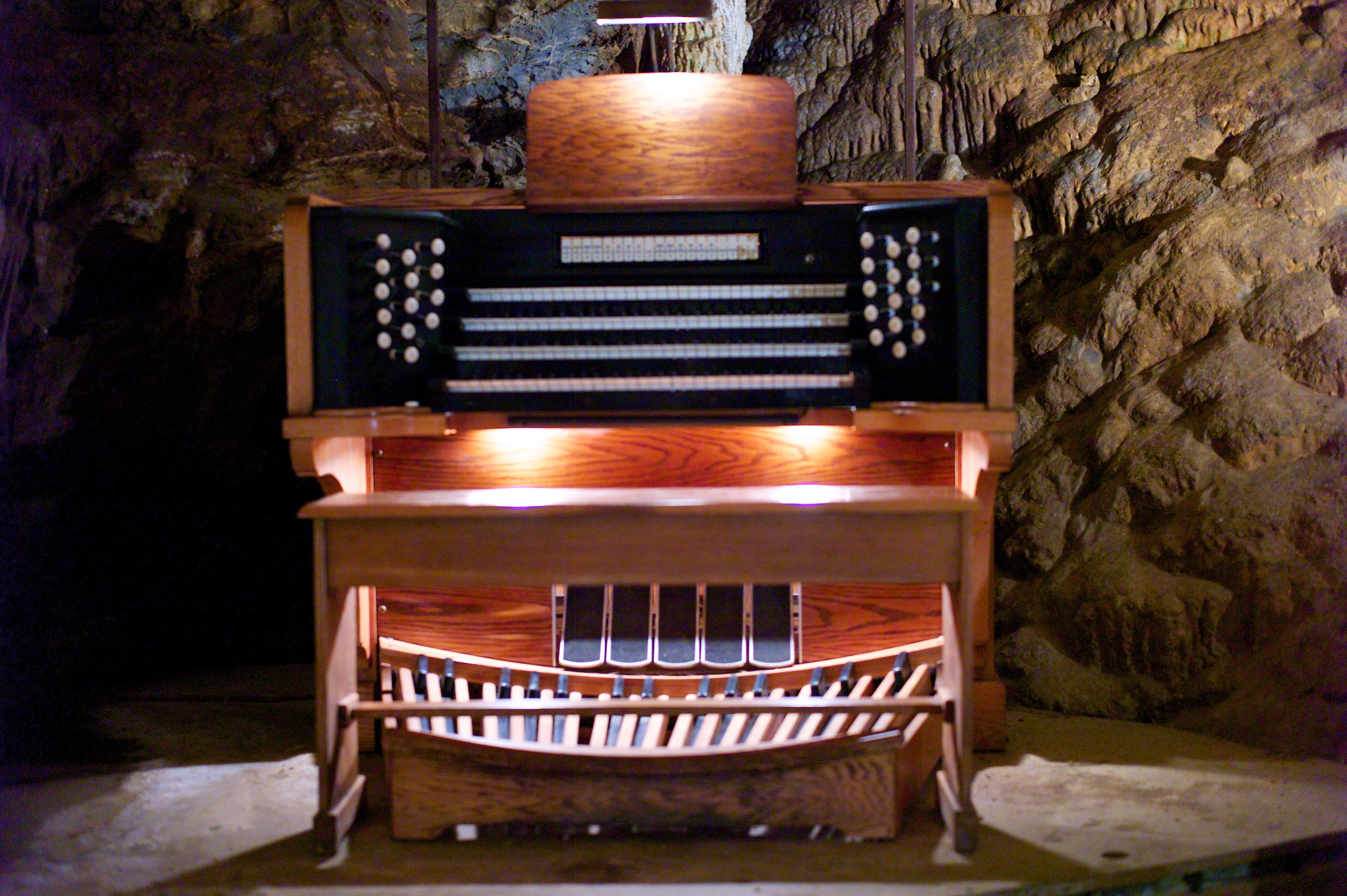
- Console of the organ

Lithophone
- Hornbostel–Sachs classification: 111.22 (directly-struck percussion plaques)
- Inventor: Leland W. Sprinkle
- Developed: 1956-1959

Playing range
- One octave

Composers
- Pepe Deluxé

The Great Stalacpipe Organ is an electrically actuated lithophone located in Luray Caverns, Virginia, USA. Covering 3.5 acres of the cavern, it is considered the world's largest instrument by Guinness World Records.

It is operated by a custom console that produces the tapping of ancient stalactites of varying sizes with solenoid-actuated rubber mallets in order to produce tones. The instrument's name was derived from the resemblance of the selected thirty-seven naturally formed stalactites to the pipework of a traditional pipe organ along with its custom organ-style keyboard console. It was designed and implemented in 1956 over three years by Leland W. Sprinkle inside the Luray Caverns near Shenandoah National Park in Virginia, USA.

== History ==
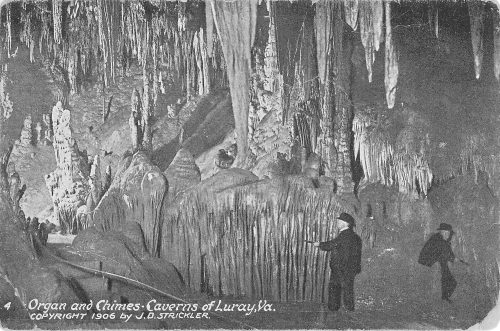
This postcard from 1906 illustrates the method of early lithophone performances in Luray Caverns

Two accounts of Sprinkle's conception of the instrument are known. From the discovery of Luray Caverns in 1878 onward, the favorable attributes of the formations for creating musical tones were well known. One of the earliest references to performances of lithophone music in Luray Caverns comes from the tour led by co-discoverer Andrew Campbell for a group sent by the Smithsonian Institution in 1880. According to a summary of the report incorporated into the earliest printed guides to Luray Caverns, Campbell surprised the group by playing a tune on a formation, probably the one that came to be known as the Organ. By the early 20th century, performances of folk tunes, hymns, and other well-known pieces were a regular part of guided tours. According to the modern guided tour, Sprinkle is said to have conceived the idea for the Great Stalacpipe Organ during one of these performances when he toured Luray Caverns on his son's birthday in 1954.

A variation of the story of the instrument's conception is that Sprinkle's son Robert hit his head on a stalactite, producing a tone that inspired Sprinkle to invent the instrument. This account is the one published in a Meccano Magazine article from 1961 and in an article in the 1959 Rosicrucian Digest.

== Construction ==
Leland W. Sprinkle created the Great Stalacpipe Organ over three years by finding and shaving appropriate stalactites to produce specific notes. He then wired a mallet for each stalactite that is activated by pressing an associated key on the instrument's keyboard. The stalactites are distributed through approximately 3.5 acres (14,000 m^{2}) of the caverns but can be heard anywhere within its 64-acre (260,000 m^{2}) confines.

The organ console was constructed by Klann Organ Supply of Waynesboro, Virginia. The original console design featured volume-control switching cylinders actuated by pedals and ranks of draw-knobs designated "Pedal," "Harmonic," "Solo," and "Echo" which altered the amplifier settings, but this feature was subsequently removed in favor of the aesthetics offered by amplifying every note at a constant level. The organ can be heard throughout the caverns without use of the loudspeaker system, though it is not typically operated this way when open to the public.

== Recordings ==
Sound of Stalacpipe Organ

During its first three decades, vinyl records (both 7-inch 33 1/3 rpm and 45 RPM) of the Great Stalacpipe Organ were sold in the Luray Caverns gift shop. These early recordings featured Sprinkle at the organ manual. Later recordings of Sprinkle's performances were sold on cassette tape before organist Monte Maxwell created his own arrangements and recordings of the organ which sell there on CD.

While earlier gift shop recordings were created live during a performance of the organ, Monte Maxwell's recording was produced via sampling; the tracks on this release are the result of using a synthesizer to create each song from the original samples. Some details about this process are available in the booklet which accompanies the CD.

In 2011, the Finnish/Swedish music collective Pepe Deluxé became the first artists to write and record an original composition on The Great Stalacpipe Organ. Paul Malmström (one half of the group with Jari Salo) played and recorded "In The Cave" which is featured on Pepe Deluxé's album Queen of the Wave.

== Gallery ==
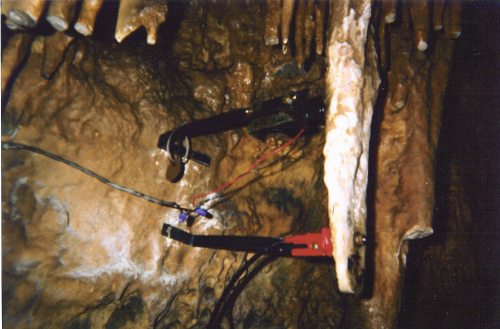
The organ manuals control solenoids that strike each stalactite with a rubber mallet

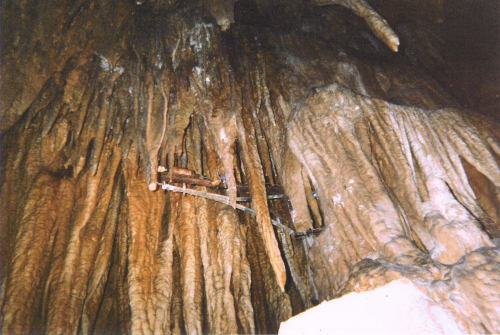
The instrument requires regular upkeep as its components succumb to corrosion due to the high humidity of the caverns

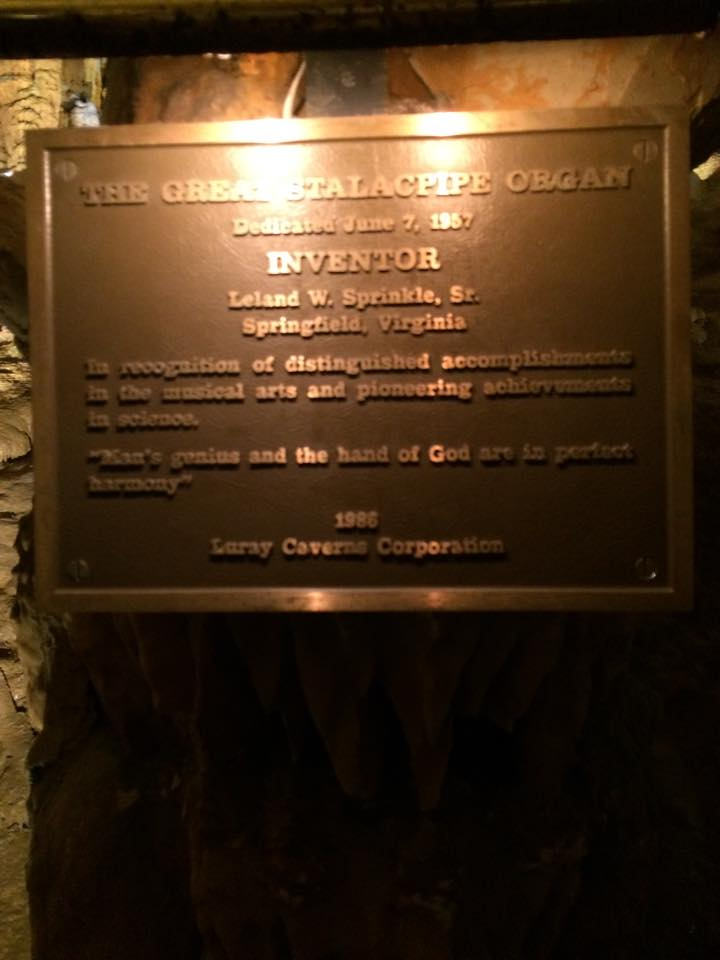
Plaque inside the caverns dedicated to the inventor of the Great Stalacpipe Organ

== See also ==
- Enharmonic equivalent
- Tuned percussion
- Found object (music)
