= Invisible Storm =

Studio album by Edward Vesala
- Released: 1992
- Recorded: May and June 1991
- Studio: Sound and Fury Studio; Helsinki, Finland
- Genre: Jazz
- Length: 60:13
- Label: ECM; ECM 1461
- Producer: Manfred Eicher

Edward Vesala chronology
Ode to the Death of Jazz (1989)	Invisible Storm (1992)	Nordic Gallery (1995)

Invisible Storm is an album by Finnish jazz drummer and bandleader Edward Vesala recorded over two sessions in May and June 1991 and released on ECM the following year.

== Reception ==
The AllMusic review awarded the album 2 stars.

Professional ratings
Review scores
Source	Rating
AllMusic	2/5 stars
The Penguin Guide to Jazz Recordings	4/4 stars

== Track listing ==
All compositions by Edward Vesala

1. "Sheets and Shrouds" – 0:35
2. "Murmuring Morning" – 1:21
3. "Gordion's Flashes" – 6:26
4. "Shadows on the Frontier" – 7:56
5. "In the Gate of Another Gate" – 1:35
6. "Somnamblues" – 8:39
7. "Sarastus" – 5:36
8. "The Wedding of All Essential Parts" – 11:09
9. "The Invisible Storm" – 7:25
10. "The Haze of the Frost" – 3:25
11. "Caccaroo Boohoo" – 6:26

== Personnel ==
- Edward Vesala – drums, percussion
- Matti Riikonen – trumpet
- Jorma Tapio – alto saxophone, bass clarinet, flute, bass flute, percussion
- Jouni Kannisto – tenor saxophone, flute
- Pepa Päivinen – soprano saxophone, tenor saxophone, baritone saxophone, flute, alto flute
- Iro Haarla – piano, harp, keyboards
- Jimi Sumen – guitar
- Marko Ylönen – cello
- Pekka Sarmanto – bass
- Mark Nauseef – bongos
