= Lumi (album) =

Studio album by Edward Vesala
- Released: 1987
- Recorded: June 1986
- Studio: Finnvox Studios; Helsinki, Finland
- Genre: Jazz
- Length: 38:46
- Label: ECM 1339
- Producer: Manfred Eicher

Edward Vesala chronology
Kullervo (1985)	Lumi (1987)	Ode to the Death of Jazz (1989)

Lumi is an album by Finnish jazz drummer and bandleader Edward Vesala recorded in 1986 and released on the ECM label in 1987. The ensemble consists brass section Esko Heikkinen and Tom Bildo, woodwind section Pentti Lahti, Jorma Tapio, Tapani Rinne, and Kari Heinilä, and rhythm section Taito Vainio, Raoul Björkenheim, Iro Haarla, Häkä, and Vesala himself.

== Reception ==
Critical reception to the album has been divided.

Describing the album as an “unqualified masterpiece”, The Penguin Guide to Jazz selected it as part of its suggested Core Collection, and also awarded it a "Crown" indicating an album for which the authors felt “special admiration or affection”.

The AllMusic review awarded the album 2 stars.

Professional ratings
Review scores
Source	Rating
AllMusic	2/5 stars
Penguin Guide to Jazz	👑

== Track listing ==
All compositions by Edward Vesala except as indicated

1. "The Wind" – 9:00
2. "Frozen Melody" – 4:19
3. "Calypso Bulbosa" – 4:52
4. "Third Moon" – 2:53
5. "Lumi" – 6:36
6. "Camel Walk" – 4:58
7. "Fingo" – 3:23
8. "Early Messenger" – 2:31
9. "Together" (Edward Vesala, Tomasz Stańko) – 6:14

== Personnel ==
- Edward Vesala – drums, percussion
- Esko Heikkinen – trumpet, piccolo trumpet
- Tom Bildo – trombone, tuba
- Pentti Lahti – alto saxophone, baritone saxophone, flute
- Jorma Tapio – alto saxophone, clarinet, bass clarinet, flute
- Tapani Rinne – tenor saxophone, soprano saxophone, clarinet
- Kari Heinilä – tenor saxophone, soprano saxophone, flute
- Taito Vainio – accordion
- Raoul Björkenheim – guitar
- Iro Haarla – piano, harp
- Häkä – bass
