= Giraffes on Horseback Salad =

1937 screenplay by Salvador Dalí

Giraffes on Horseback Salad, also called The Surrealist Woman, was a screenplay written in 1937 by Salvador Dalí for the Marx Brothers. It was to be a love story between a Spanish aristocrat named "Jimmy" (to be played by Harpo Marx, with whom Dalí was friends) and a "beautiful surrealist woman, whose face is never seen by the audience". Dalí considered that the central theme of the film would be "the continuous struggle between the imaginative life as depicted in the old myths and the practical and rational life of contemporary society" and hoped that the film score could be written by Cole Porter.

The film was never produced. Harper's Magazine posits that this was because Metro-Goldwyn-Mayer, the Marx Brothers' studio at the time, considered it to be too surreal: proposed scenes included giraffes wearing gas masks on fire, and Harpo Marx using a butterfly net to capture "the eighteen smallest dwarfs in the city". Serena Davies, writing in the Telegraph, said that Groucho Marx felt that the proposed film was not funny. Tate Modern curator Matthew Gale has suggested that Dalí may have considered an actual production to be beside the point.

For several years, the screenplay to Giraffes was thought to be lost. In 1991-92, New York City theater collective Elevator Repair Service produced Marx Brothers on Horseback Salad, combining scenes from an attempted reconstruction of the screenplay (based partially on having "watched every Marx Brothers film they could find") with scenes of Dalí's real-life interactions with Harpo Marx and Susan Fleming. In 1996, a "screenplay" amounting to a few paragraphs was found amid Dalí's personal papers.

In the mid-2010s, with the help of the Gala-Salvador Dalí Foundation, Josh Frank located an 84-page handwritten notebook in the Centre Pompidou in which Dalí had laid out all of his thoughts and visions for the project. As apparently a full screenplay had never existed, Frank worked with Tim Heidecker to develop one based on the notes. This screenplay was adapted as a graphic novel illustrated by Manuela Pertega, and published together with 40 pages of historical background notes by Quirk Books in March 2019. On July 26, 2019, the official Giraffes on Horseback Salad Soundtrack, with full musical numbers and Marx Brothers comedy routines, was released by Lakeshore Records. It featured music by Quin Arbeitman and Pepe Deluxé, and performances by Frank Ferrante as Groucho Marx, Matt Roper as Chico Marx, Charlotta Kerbs as the Surrealist Woman, and Owen Egerton as the Announcer.

A poster for the abandoned film was produced by designer Fernando Reza in 2019.

== See also ==
- List of works by Salvador Dalí
