= SlowHill =

Finnish instrumental band

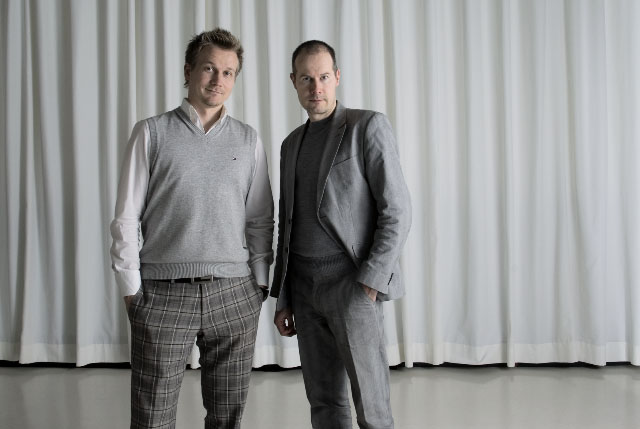
- SlowHill members Slow (Vellu Maurola) and Tapani Rinne

Background information
- Origin: Helsinki, Finland
- Genres: Jazz, electronic, lounge, downtempo
- Years active: 2002–present
- Labels: Blue Note Records, Plastinka Records, Universal Music,
- Members: Slow, Tapani Rinne
- Website: www.slowhill.com

SlowHill are a Finnish instrumental downtempo/lounge band formed in 2002 by Slow (aka Vellu Maurola) and award-winning saxophonist Tapani Rinne. The band fuses downtempo beats into easy listening jazz atmospheres.

== History ==
SlowHill have released four albums via various record labels.

Their debut album, Finndisc, was the first electronica album released by the jazz label Blue Note in Finland. It was subsequently released by Blue Note in the UK, Japan, Germany, Switzerland, Italy and the Netherlands. The band unearthed and sampled classic jazz records from the vaults of EMI Finland, which owns Blue Note's catalogue. Jazz artists sampled include Heikki Sarmanto, Teuvo Suojärvi, Mike Koskinen, Carita Holmström and Pekka Pohjola. Pohjola's sample, used on the track "Valo", was also used by DJ Shadow on his track "Midnight in a Perfect World" from Endtroducing......

The band’s second album, Fennika, was released by Plastinka Records in 2005. It features a track composed for a Pablo Neruda poem and samples from Rajaton’s song "Butterfly".

The band’s third album, Muzak, was released in June 2010 by Universal Music Finland. Guest musicians include violinist Pekka Kuusisto on electric guitars, percussionist Teho Majamäki and vocalist Siiri Nordin. It also marks the appearance of the first cover song by SlowHill: Rauno Lehtinen’s jazz classic "Toiset meistä".

== Discography ==
=== Albums ===
- Finndisc (2002)
- Fennika (2005)
- Muzak (2010)
- Lento (2017)
