= Spare Time Machine =

Studio album by Pepe Deluxé
- Released: 25 July 2007
- Genre: Psychedelic rock
- Length: 46:10
- Label: Catskills
- Producer: James Spectrum

Pepe Deluxé chronology
Beatitude (2003)	Spare Time Machine (2007)	Queen of the Wave (2012)

Professional ratings
Review scores
Source	Rating
BBC	(favorable)
Indie London	4/5 stars
InTheMix	(favorable)
Stranger	(favorable)
TinyMixTapes	5/5 stars

Spare Time Machine is the third album by Pepe Deluxé, released on 25 July 2007. The first Pepe Deluxé album entirely without samples, it features dozens of musicians including several members of the band Husky Rescue. Though sales were slow, the group's third album resonated with music journalists, earning an Emma (the Finnish version of Grammy) under the "critic's choice" category. Spare Time Machine was ranked as one of PopMatters' Slipped Discs 2007.

== Track listing ==
1. The Mischief of Cloud 6
2. Ms. Wilhelmina & Her Hat
3. Go for Blue
4. Last of the Great Explorers
5. Pussy Cat Rock
6. Apple Thief
7. Lucky The Blind
8. Captain Carter’s Fathoms
9. Forgotten Knights Prelude
10. Forgotten Knights
