= Ode to the Death of Jazz =

Studio album by Edward Vesala
- Released: 1990
- Recorded: April and May 1989
- Studio: Sound and Fury Studio; Helsinki, Finland
- Genre: Jazz
- Length: 55:55
- Label: ECM; ECM 1413
- Producer: Manfred Eicher

Edward Vesala chronology
Lumi (1986)	Ode to the Death of Jazz (1990)	Invisible Storm (1991)

Ode to the Death of Jazz is an album by Finnish jazz drummer and bandleader Edward Vesala recorded over two sessions in April and May 1989 and released on ECM the following year. The ensemble consists trumpeter Matti Riikonen, woodwind section Jorma Tapio, Jouni Kannisto and Pepa Päivinen, accordionist Taito Vainio, rhythm section Jimi Sumén, Iro Haarla and Vesala, and percussionist Tim Ferchen.

== Reception ==
Professional ratings
Review scores
Source	Rating
AllMusic	2.5/5 stars
The Penguin Guide to Jazz Recordings	4/4 stars

The AllMusic review by Brian Olewnick awarded the album 2½ stars stating "it feels as though something essential is being restrained, as though Vesala is reluctant to simply let his ensemble surge forward unbound. Fine instrumental work abounds, however, notably by the leader himself on drums and the Garbarek-laden tones of tenor saxophonist Jouni Kannisto. In sum, the listener gets the impression that, although all the elements are in place for a fine album, excessive control has led to a dilution of the power that could have been".

== Track listing ==
All compositions by Edward Vesala

1. "Sylvan Swizzle" – 8:34
2. "Infinite Express" – 7:54
3. "Time to Think" – 7:34
4. "Winds of Sahara" – 4:19
5. "Watching for the Signal" – 8:13
6. "A Glimmer of Sepal" – 5:26
7. "Mop Mop" – 5:37
8. "What? Where? Hum Hum" – 8:19

== Personnel ==
- Edward Vesala – drums, percussion
- Matti Riikonen – trumpet
- Jorma Tapio – alto saxophone, bass clarinet, flute
- Jouni Kannisto – tenor saxophone, flute
- Pepa Päivinen – soprano saxophone, tenor saxophone, baritone saxophone, flute, bass clarinet
- Taito Vainio – accordion
- Jimi Sumén – guitar
- Iro Haarla – piano, harp, keyboards
- Uffe Krokfors – bass
- Tim Ferchen – marimba, tubular bells
