= Nan Madol (album) =

Studio album by Edward Vesala
- Released: 1974
- Recorded: April 25–26, 1974
- Studio: Alppi Studio; Helsinki, Finland
- Genre: Jazz
- Length: 45:07
- Label: JAPO; ECM 1077 ST
- Producer: Manfred Eicher

Edward Vesala chronology
Hot Lotta (1973)	Nan Madol (1974)	Satu (1976)

ECM Reissue Cover

Nan Madol is an album by Finnish jazz drummer and composer Edward Vesala, recorded over two days in April 1974 and released on ECM's JAPO imprint later that year. It was re-released on ECM in 1976.

== Reception ==
Professional ratings
Review scores
Source	Rating
AllMusic	4.5/5 stars
The Penguin Guide to Jazz Recordings	3.5/4 stars

The AllMusic review by Michael G. Nastos awarded the album 4½ stars stating "Leader plays percussion, flutes, harp. With Finnish friends in duo to large-ensemble contexts."

== Track listing ==
All tracks are written by Edward Vesala

Side I
No.	Title	Length
1.	"Nan Madol"	6:02
2.	"Love for Living"	3:47
3.	"Call from the Sea"	1:58
4.	"The Way of..."	12:09
Total length:		23:56

Side II
No.	Title	Length
1.	"Areous vlor ta"	12:38
2.	"The Wind"	9:23
Total length:		22:01

== Personnel ==
- Edward Vesala – drums, percussion, flute, harp
- Teppo Hauta-aho – bass, voice (tracks 1, & 4–6)
- Sakari Kukko – flute (track 1)
- Elisabeth Leistola – harp (track 4)
- Charlie Mariano – alto saxophone, flute (tracks 5 & 6)
- Pentti Lahti – soprano saxophone, bass clarinet (tracks 5 & 6)
- Seppo Paakkunainen – soprano saxophone, flute (tracks 5 & 6)
- Juhani Aaltonen – tenor saxophone, soprano saxophone, flute, piccolo flute, bells, voice (tracks: 1, 2, & 4–6)
- Mircea Stan – trombone (track 5)
- Kaj Backlund – trumpet (tracks 1, 4 & 5)
- Juhani Poutanen – violin, viola, voice (tracks 1 & 4–6)
