= Queen of the Wave =

Studio album by Pepe Deluxé
- Released: 30 January 2012
- Genres: Progressive pop; baroque pop; surf rock; electronica; experimental
- Length: 48:11
- Labels: Asthmatic Kitty (US), Catskills (UK)
- Producer: James Spectrum

Pepe Deluxé chronology
Spare Time Machine (2007)	Queen of the Wave (2012)

Queen of the Wave is the fourth album by Pepe Deluxé, released on CD by Catskills in the UK on January 30, 2012, and digitally by Asthmatic Kitty in the US on January 31. Styled as "an esoteric pop opera in three parts", the album's cover art and liner notes were designed by James Spectrum.

Profits from album sales were donated to the John Nurminen Foundation, specifically for the charity's Clean Baltic Sea project. Music for "In the Cave" was recorded on the Great Stalacpipe Organ, the largest musical instrument in the world.

Queen of the Wave lyrics contain numerous references to the 1905 occult book A Dweller on Two Planets.

== Promotion ==
Promotional videos were produced for the album as well as the tracks "Go Supersonic", "In the Cave", and "A Night and a Day". The video for "Go Supersonic" was chosen as a staff pick on Vimeo.

The group, now consisting of Finnish producer James Spectrum and Swedish composer Paul Malmström, released five album companions in conjunction with the album through their website, as well as a free iPad app.

== Reception ==
Professional ratings
Aggregate scores
Source	Rating
Metacritic	70/100 (15 critics)
Review scores
Source	Rating
Clash	8/10 stars
Exclaim!	(favorable)
Mixmag	4/5 stars
MusicOMH	4/5 stars
PopMatters	10/10 stars
Sputnikmusic	4/5 stars

On the review aggregate site Metacritic, the album has a score of 70 out of 100, indicating "generally favorable reviews".

Alan Ranta of PopMatters gave the album a PopMatters Pick designation, proclaiming it to be "the most impressive album ever painstakingly assembled across space and time." Mixmag's Thomas Green praised the albums eccentricities, writing, "Pepe Deluxé's fourth album makes Queen or Kanye's madly eclectic sonic excesses look like a campfire strum-along." Ben Hogwood of musicOMH wrote that "anyone looking for a return to the good old days when albums were invested with tender loving care will want to hear it." Clash also gave the album a positive review, as Anna Wilson wrote, "Its cleverness and humour burst like springs from an overstuffed rococo couch. Splendidly indulgent."

On their 75 Best Albums of 2012 list, PopMatters ranked Queen of the Wave at #17.

== Track listing ==
No.	Title	Length
1.	"Queenswave"	4:54
2.	"A Night and a Day"	4:04
3.	"Go Supersonic"	4:44
4.	"Temple of Unfed Fire"	2:48
5.	"Contain Thyself"	3:52
6.	"Hesperus Garden"	4:09
7.	"Grave Prophecy"	4:33
8.	"In the Cave"	1:51
9.	"My Flaming Thirst"	3:49
10.	"Iron Giant"	2:22
11.	"The Storm"	3:43
12.	"Riders on the First Ark"	7:18

== Personnel ==
Contributors to Queen of the Wave include

- James Spectrum - Engineer
- Paul Malmström - Synthesizer, Handclaps, Organ, Recorder, Harpsichord, Guitar, Horns, Tambourine, Bass, Violin, Cello, Clarinet, Harmonium, Piano, Glockenspiel, Flute, Triangle, Vibraphone, Harp
- Boi Crompton, Chris Cote, Johanna Försti, Lumimarja Wilenius, Sara Welling, Tuire Lukka - Vocals
- Miikka Paatelainen - Guitar, Bass, Balalaika, Bouzouki, Glockenspiel, Vibraphone
- Kai Hahto, Markku Reinikainen, Teppo Mäkynen - Drums
- Timo Lassy - Flute, Saxophone, Horns
- Kati Pirttimaa - Pipe Organ
- Jukka Eskola - Trumpet, French Horn
- Mikko Mustonen - Tuba, Trombone
- Jarmo Saari - Viola, Guitar
