= Investigation into the Invisible World =

2002 film by Jean-Michel Roux

- Film poster
- Directed by: Jean-Michel Roux
- Written by: Jean-Michel Roux
- Produced by: Marc Baschet; Mathieu Bompoint; Frédérique Dumas-Zajdela
- Cinematography: Jean-Louis Vialard
- Edited by: Joseph Licidé
- Music by: Biosphere; Hector Zazou
- Production company: Noé Productions
- Distributed by: Mars Distribution
- Release date: 30 September 2002
- Running time: 87 minutes
- Country: France
- Language: Icelandic

Investigation into the Invisible World (French: Enquête sur le monde invisible) is a 2002 French documentary film directed by Jean-Michel Roux. The film surveys the belief in paranormal phenomena among the population of Iceland.

== Summary ==
Several Icelanders are interviewed and say they used to play with elves as children. Mediums sometimes contact the Icelandic Road Administration when a planned road crosses a known elf site, and the agency takes measures to not cause problems for the elves. The seismologist Ragnar Stefánsson argues that the elf phenomenon can be understood as a way to cope with Iceland's geology and volcanic activity. The neopagan leader Jörmundur Ingi Hansen explains it from a pagan cosmological viewpoint; he says the term huldufólk—hidden people—emerged as a euphemism because the word "elves" has a stronger religious connotation. Iceland's former president Vigdís Finnbogadóttir says she thinks the belief in elves and ghosts is strong in Iceland because Catholicism never was particularly strong.

Several people say they have seen a monstrous sea serpent off the Icelandic coast. These sightings are conventionally explained as hallucinations rather than spirits or unknown animals. The film director Friðrik Þór Friðriksson and several others talk about their personal sightings of UFOs and encounters with what they believe were extraterrestrial beings.

Icelanders tell stories about their encounters with ghosts. The manager of Hótel Borg in Reykjavík contacts a medium after unusual activities and is told there are many ghosts at the hotel. Mediums and a priest talk about their experiences and conceptions of angels. Scientists and clairvoyants lay out their theories about paranormal experiences. Healers talk about their practices. Participants in the film talk about the future; they hope their practices will be unified with science and more people will have access to their abilities.

== Reception ==
The film was released in French cinemas on 30 September 2002. It was shown at international film festivals from 2002 to 2004, including the 38th Karlovy Vary International Film Festival, 2003 Toronto International Film Festival and 2004 Sundance Film Festival.

Le Monde's Jacques Mandelbaum thought the film was a missed opportunity, because it does not explore the possibilities of cinema beyond putting interviews to music. Bruno Icher of Libération wrote that the film exhibits the director's appreciation for "the paganistic charm of Iceland" and creates an impression of moving between fiction and investigation; the critic called it a "throbbing and delirious lullaby where discerning the true from the false does not have the slightest importance". Eddie Cockrell of Variety wrote that the film is made with "a breathtaking bag of technical tricks", calling it "hugely entertaining" and a "nature documentary as otherworldly thriller".

== See also ==
- Huldufólk 102, a 2006 documentary film
- Scandinavian folklore
