= Satu (Edward Vesala album) =

Studio album by Edward Vesala
- Released: 1977
- Recorded: October 1976
- Studio: Talent Studios; Oslo, Norway
- Genre: Jazz
- Length: 39:42
- Label: ECM; ECM 1088 ST
- Producer: Manfred Eicher

Edward Vesala chronology
Nan Madol (1974)	Satu (1977)	Heavylife (1980)

Satu is an album by Finnish jazz drummer and bandleader Edward Vesala recorded in October 1976 and released on ECM the following year.

== Reception ==
Professional ratings
Review scores
Source	Rating
AllMusic	2/5 stars

The AllMusic review awarded the album 2 stars.

== Track listing ==
All tracks are written by Edward Vesala except where noted.

Side I
No.	Title	Length
1.	"Satu"	14:37
2.	"Ballade for San"	6:10
Total length:		20:47

Side II
No.	Title	Writer(s)	Length
1.	"Star Flight"		5:42
2.	"Komba"		6:07
3.	"Together"	Vesala; Stańko	7:06
Total length:			18:55 39:42

== Personnel ==
=== Musicians ===
- Edward Vesala – drums
- Tomasz Stańko – trumpet
- Palle Mikkelborg – flugelhorn ("Satu", "Star Flight"), trumpet ("Ballade for San", "Star Flight", "Komba")
- Torbjørn Sunde – trombone (except "Together")
- Juhani Aaltonen – soprano saxophone ("Komba"), tenor saxophone ("Star Flight"), flute ("Satu", "Ballade for San"), alto flute ("Together")
- Tomasz Szukalski – soprano saxophone ("Satu", "Star Flight", "Komba"), tenor saxophone ("Ballade for San", "Komba")
- Knut Riisnæs – flute ("Satu"), tenor saxophone ("Ballade for San", "Star Flight")
- Rolf Malm – bass clarinet ("Satu", "Ballade for San", "Komba")
- Terje Rypdal – guitar (except "Together")
- Palle Danielsson – bass
- (uncredited – strings) ("Together")

=== Technical personnel ===
- Manfred Eicher – producer
- Jan Erik Kongshaug – recording engineer
- Henry Reidel – mastering
- Dieter Bonhorst – layout
- Lajos Keresztes – cover photography
- Timo Kelaranta – liner photography
