= Luray Caverns =

Cave in Virginia, United States

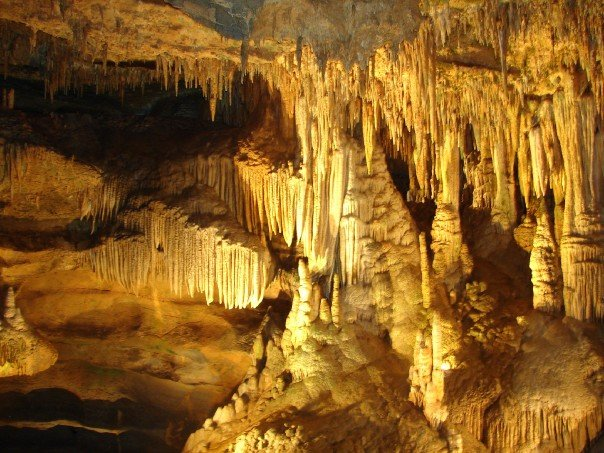
- Stalactites, stalagmites and columns in Luray Caverns

- Location within Virginia Location within the United States
- Location: Luray, Virginia
- Coordinates: 38°39′51.5″N 78°29′1.7″W
- Designated: 1973
- Website: Official website

Luray Caverns, previously Luray Cave, is a cave just west of Luray, Virginia, United States, which has drawn many visitors since its discovery in 1878. The cavern system is adorned with speleothems such as columns, stalactites, stalagmites, flowstone, and mirrored pools. The caverns host the Great Stalacpipe Organ, a lithophone made from solenoid-fired strikers that tap stalactites of varied sizes to produce tones similar to those of xylophones, tuning forks, or bells.

A Smithsonian Institution report of July 13 and 14, 1880, concluded: "[I]t is safe to say that there is probably no other cave in the world more completely and profusely decorated with stalactite and stalagmite ornamentation than that of Luray."

Luray Caverns is privately owned by the Graves family, who have lived in Luray for many years. Theodore Clay Northcott, great-grandfather to the owners, purchased the land on which the caverns are located in 1905.

== Description ==
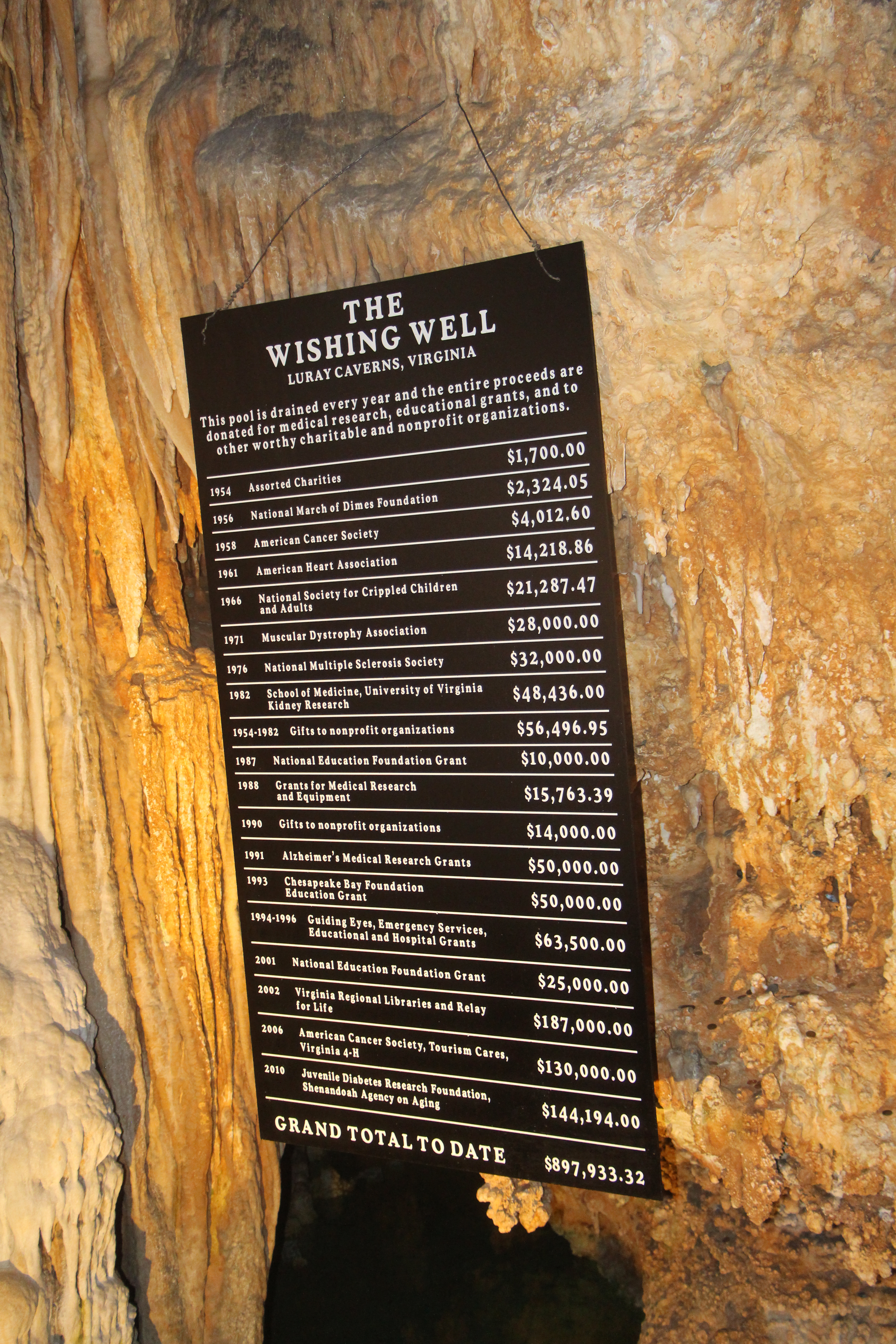
Sign at Wishing Well rock formation describing donations made to Page County charities

Visitors enter the cave via a path that curves downward through the caverns, eventually reaching Dream Lake, The Saracen's Tent, The Great Stalacpipe Organ and some large stalactites and stalagmites. The path proceeds to the Wishing Well and a war memorial honoring veterans from Page County. It then ascends to a small passage past the Fried Eggs rock formation and returns to ground level through a smaller passage to the entrance. The entire trek is 1.5 mi (2.4 km) long and can be completed in 45 minutes to 1 hour. Visitors can carry small pets on the cave tour, and leashed pets are permitted on the grounds outside the cave. The caverns now offer a step-free access. While this extended pathway will allow for wheelchair access, the caverns are not advertised as accessible.

== History ==
=== Discovery ===
Luray Caverns was discovered on August 13, 1878, by five local men, including Andrew J. Campbell (a local tinsmith), William Campbell, John “Quint” Campbell, and local photographer Benton Stebbins. Their attention had been attracted by a protruding limestone outcrop and by a nearby sinkhole noted to have cool air issuing from it. Seeking a cavern, the men started to dig and, about four hours later, a hole was created for the smallest men (Andrew and Quint) to squeeze through, slide down a rope and explore by candlelight. The first column they saw was named the Washington Column, in honor of the first United States President. Upon entering the area called Skeleton's Gorge, bone fragments (among other artifacts) were found embedded in calcite. Other traces of previous human occupation include pieces of charcoal, flint, and human bone fragments embedded in stalagmite. A skeleton, thought to be that of a Native American girl, found in one of the chasms, was estimated, from the current rate of stalagmitic growth, to be not more than 500 years old. Her remains may have slipped into the caverns after her burial hole collapsed due to a sinkhole, although the real cause is unknown.

=== Litigation ===
Sam Buracker of Luray owned the land on which the cavern entrance was found. Because of uncollected debts, a court-ordered auction of all his land was held on September 14, 1878. Andrew Campbell, William Campbell, and Benton Stebbins purchased the cave tract, but kept their discovery secret until after the sale. Because the true value of the property was not realized until after the purchase, legal wrangling ensued for the next two years with attempts to prove fraud and decide rightful ownership. In April 1881, the Supreme Court of Virginia nullified the purchase by the cave discoverers. William T. Biedler of Baltimore (Buracker's in-law and major creditor) then sold the property to The Luray Cave and Hotel Company, a subsidiary of the Shenandoah Railroad Company. (The SRC became the Norfolk and Western Railroad Company in April 1881.) David Kagery of Luray and George Marshall of Uniontown, Pennsylvania, purchased the property in July 1890 and in October of that year the tract was sold to the Valley Land and Improvement Company. Under bankruptcy proceedings in 1893, the property was bought by Luray Caverns Company, owned by J. Kemp Bartlett of Baltimore.

Despite the legal disputes, rumors of the caverns' impressive formations spread quickly. Professor Jerome J. Collins, the Arctic explorer, postponed his departure on an ill-fated North Pole expedition to visit the caverns. The Smithsonian Institution sent a delegation of nine scientists to investigate. The next edition of the Encyclopædia Britannica devoted an unprecedented page and a half to the cave's wonders and Alexander J. Brand, Jr., a correspondent for the New York Times, was the first professional travel writer to visit and popularize the caverns.

=== Limair Sanatorium ===
In 1901, the cool, supposedly pure air of Luray Caverns was forced through the rooms of the Limair Sanatorium, erected on the summit of Cave Hill by Colonel Theodore Clay Northcott, former president of the Luray Caverns Corporation. The Colonel billed the sanatorium as the first air-conditioned home in the United States. On the hottest day in summer, the interior of the house was kept at a cool and comfortable 70 °F (21 °C). By sinking a shaft five feet (1.5 m) in diameter down to a cavern chamber and installing a 42-inch (1,100 mm) fan powered by a five horsepower (3.7 kW) electric motor, Northcott's system could change out the air through the entire house about every four minutes. Tests made over successive years by means of culture media and sterile plates were considered to have demonstrated the "perfect bacteriologic purity" of the air, purportedly a benefit to those suffering various respiratory illnesses. This "purity" was explained by a natural filtration process with air drawn into the caverns through myriad rocky crevices, then further cleansing by air floating over the transparent springs and pools, the product finally being supplied to the inmates of the sanatorium. The "Limair" burned down in the early 1900s but was subsequently rebuilt as a brick building. The Luray Caverns Corporation, which was chartered by Northcott, purchased the caverns in February 1905 and continues to hold the property today.

=== Commercialization ===
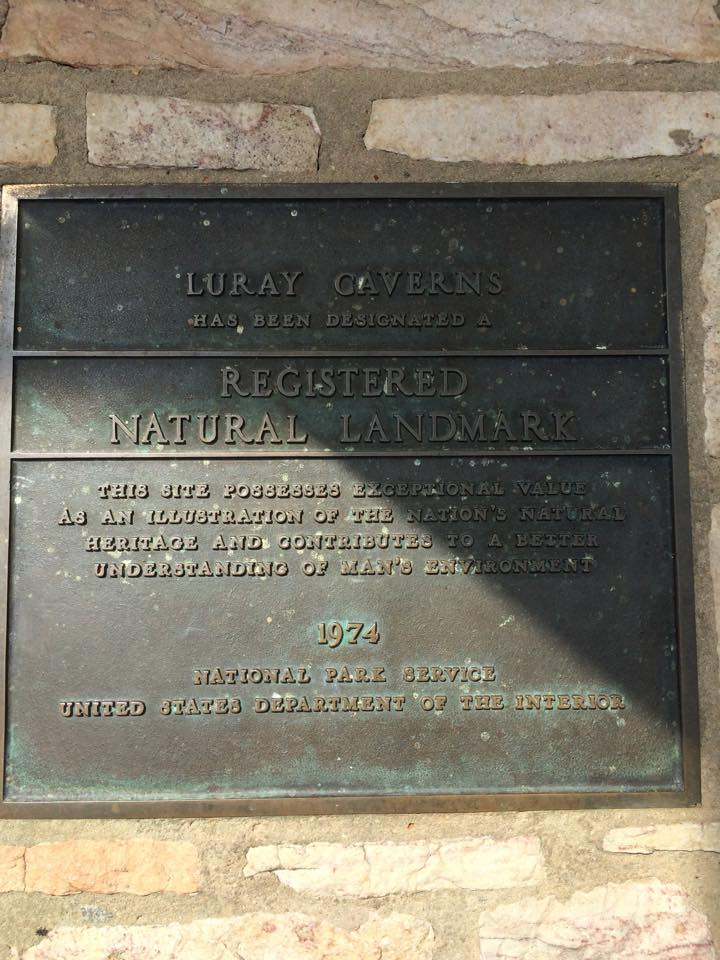
The plaque outside Luray Caverns declaring it a Natural Landmark

Portions of the caverns are open to the public and have long been electrically lighted. The registered number of visitors in 1906 was 18,000, but as of 2018, approximately 500,000 guests visit each year.

In 1974, the National Park Service and the Department of the Interior designated Luray Caverns as a National Natural Landmark.

Luray Caverns is home to a commercial rope course and hedge maze. The maze contains 1,500 dark American arborvitae which create a one-half-mile (0.80 km) path for visitors. Three museums are also on site and included with the general admission. The Toy Town Junction Museum offers an array of vintage miniature trains, dolls, and other collectible toys on display. The Car and Carriage Caravan Museum features an impressive collection of over 140 items relating to early transportation including a Conestoga wagon and an 1892 Mercedes-Benz. The Shenandoah Heritage Village is home to a collection of historic Shenandoah Valley buildings from rustic 19th-century life and the Luray Valley Museum contains many regional artifacts of significance including a 1536 Zürich Bible and a patented dog-powered butter churn.

== Geology ==
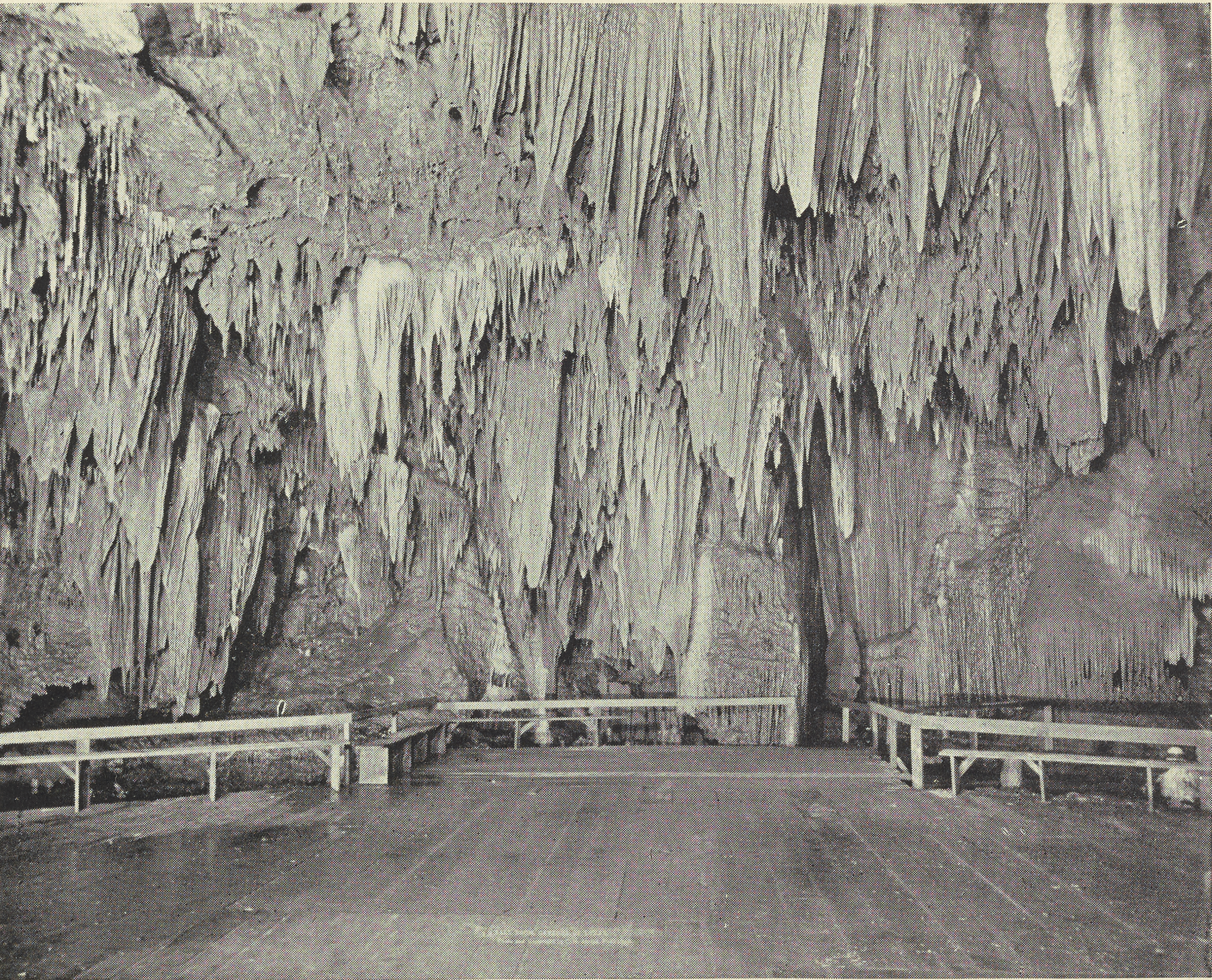
Luray Caverns Ballroom of stalactites, 1882

The caverns are situated in the Shenandoah Valley, just to the west of the Blue Ridge of the Appalachian Mountains in Luray, Virginia. The valley extends northeast to southwest along the northwest side of the Blue Ridge. Cave Hill, 927 feet (283 m) above sea level, had long been an object of local interest on account of its pits and oval hollows or sinkholes (known as karst) through one of which the discoverers of Luray Caverns entered.

Luray Caverns does not date beyond the Tertiary period. The cave is developed in dolomites of the lower Beekmantown Dolomite (Lower Ordovician). At some period, niches and already formed chambers were completely filled with water, highly charged with acid, which then slowly began to eat away at much of the softer material composing much of the walls, ceilings and floors. The one particular area that shows this high level of water is Elfin Ramble where water marks of oscillation are highly visible on the ceiling.

The temperature inside the caverns is uniformly 54 °F (12 °C), comparable to that of Mammoth Cave in Kentucky.

=== Speleothem formation ===
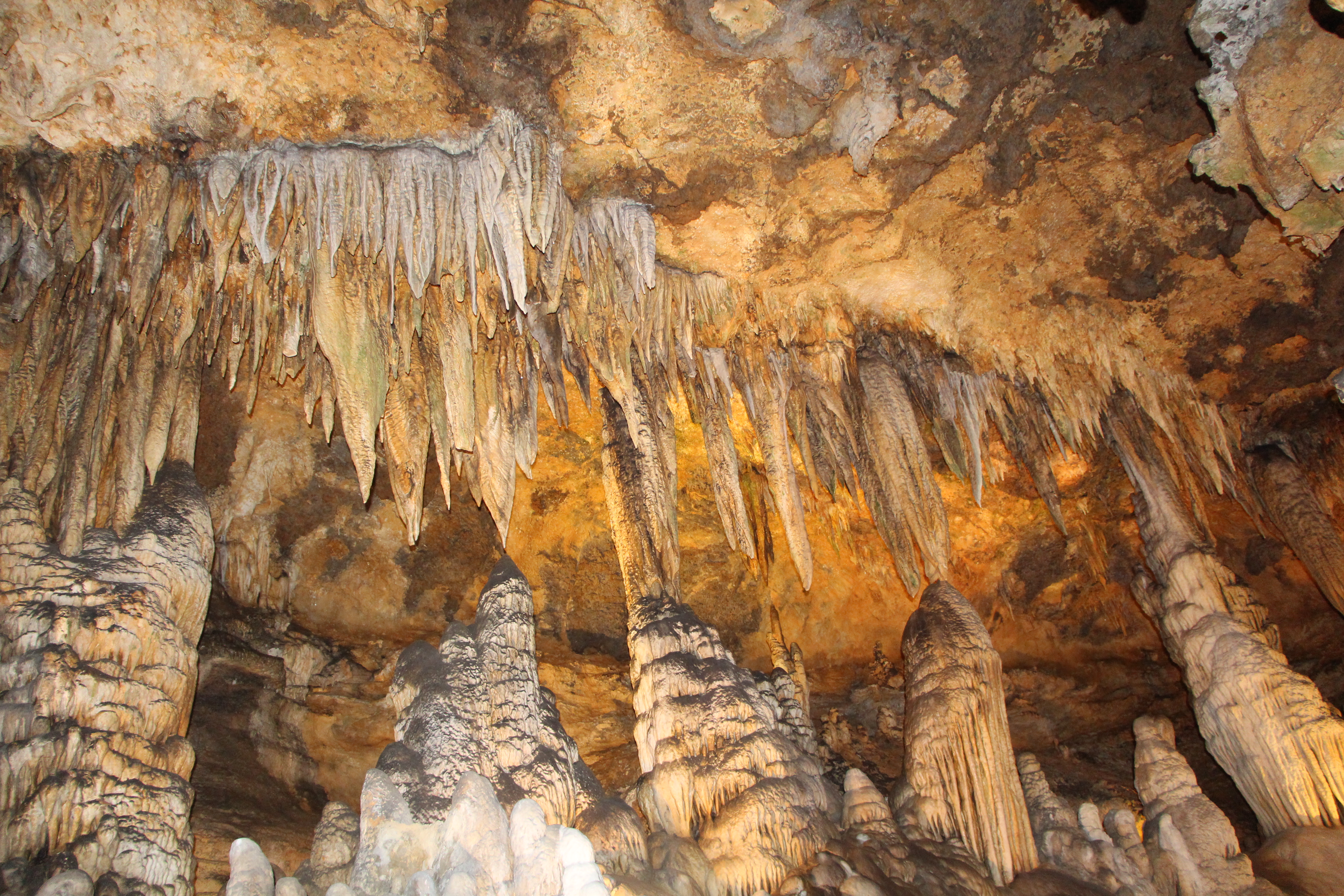
A formation of stalagmites and stalactites

As with other limestone or "solution" caves, formations at Luray Caverns result from a solution of calcium carbonate giving up some of its carbon dioxide, thus allowing a precipitation of lime to form. This precipitation begins as a thin deposit ring of crystallized calcite, but continues to collect, creating stalactites and other types of dripstone and flowstone. Formations at Luray Caverns are white in color if the calcium carbonate is in its pure form. Other colors reflect impurities in the calcite resulting from elements absorbed from the soil or rock layers: Reds and yellows due to iron and iron-stained clays; black from manganese dioxide; blues and greens from solutions of copper compounds. Luray Caverns remains an active cave where new formation deposits accumulate at the rate of about one cubic inch (16 cm^{3}) every 120 years.

=== Celebrated speleothems ===
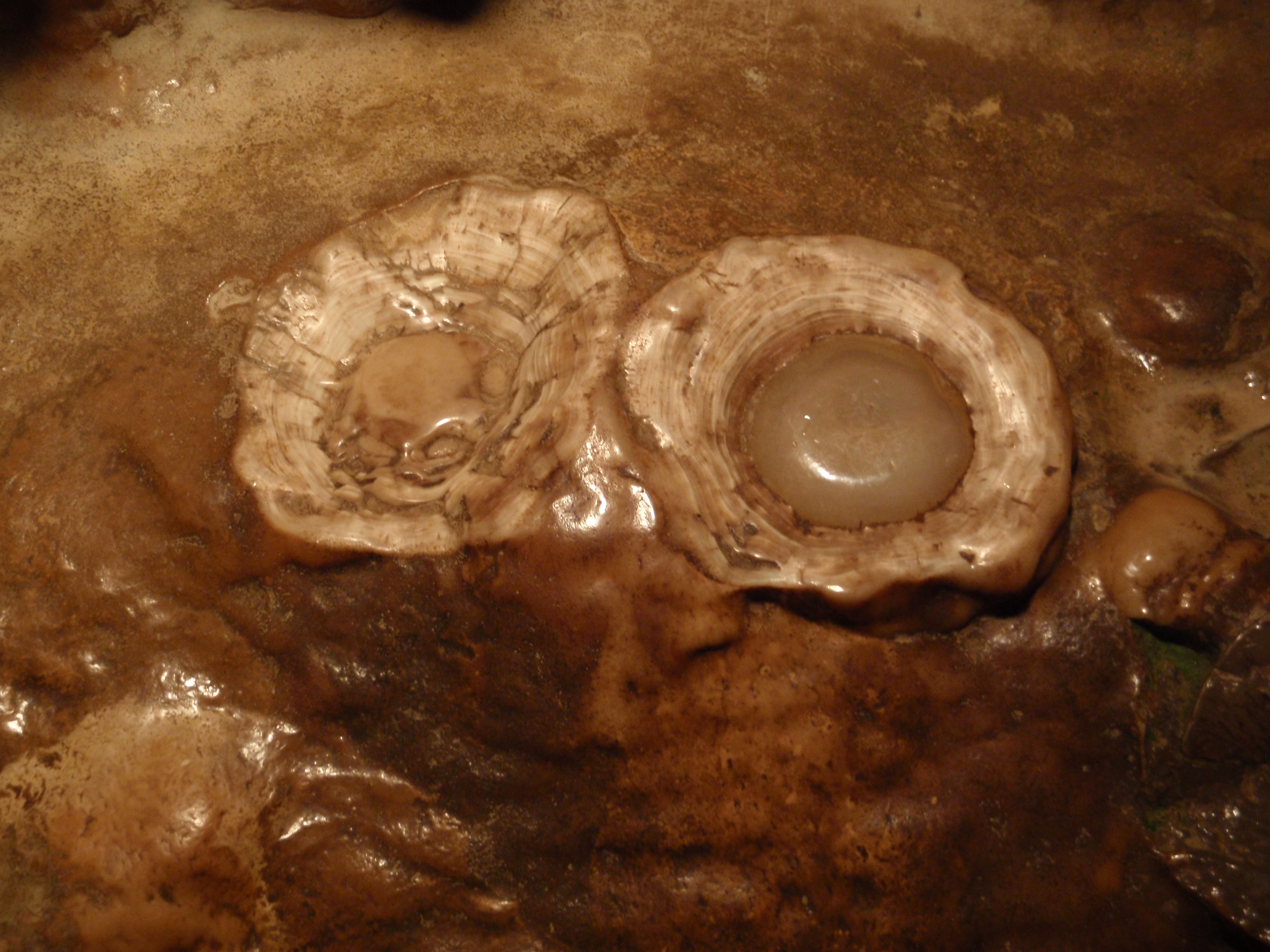
The "Fried Eggs" rock formation at Luray Caverns

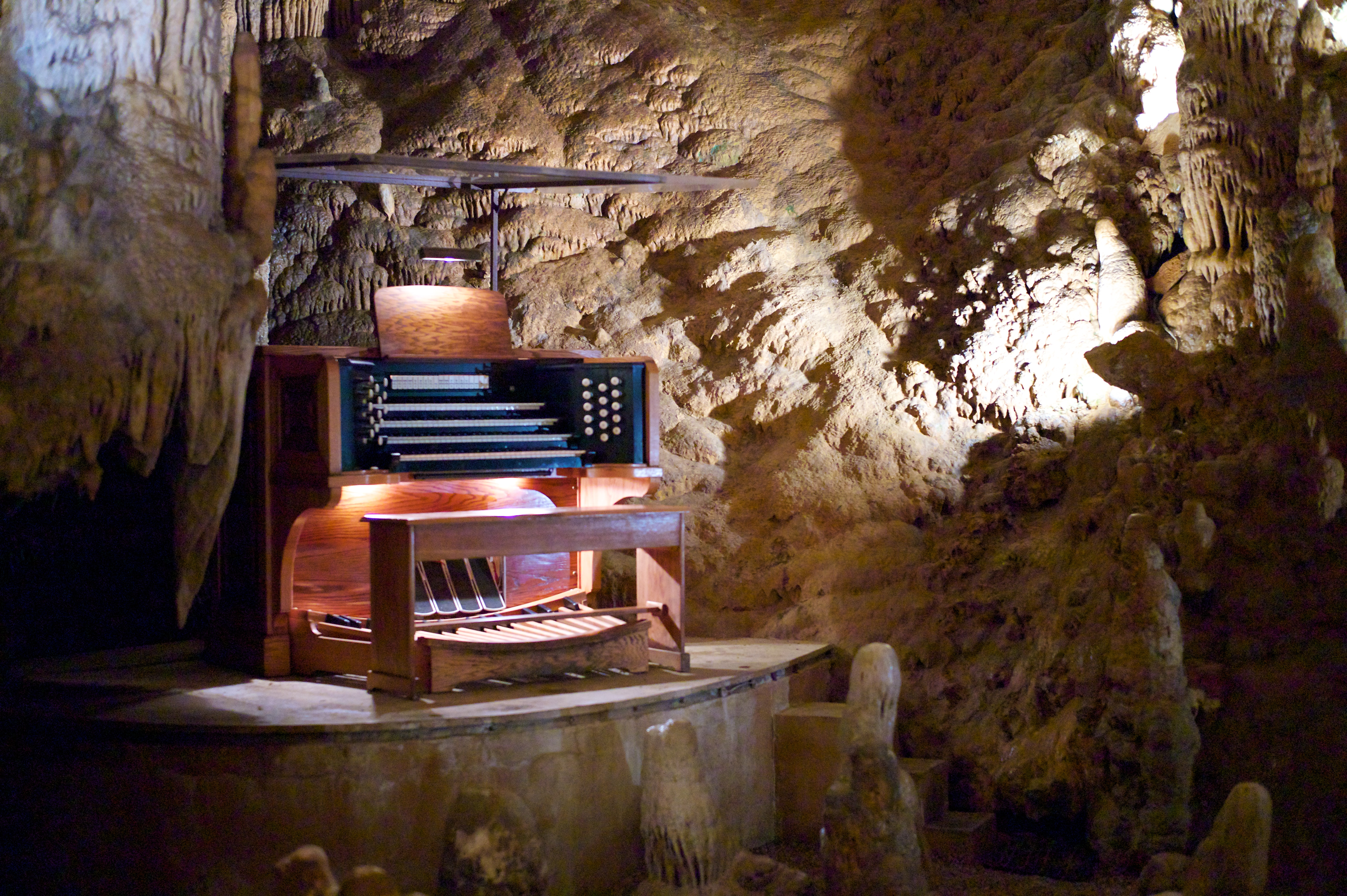
Console of the Great Stalacpipe Organ (an electrically actuated lithophone)

After the water had been mostly removed by a lowering in the water table, these eroded forms remained and growth began to take hold via stalactites, stalagmites, columns, etc. Some notable formations include the Leaning Column, undermined and tilting like the campanile of Pisa; The Great Stalacpipe Organ, a large shield formation, that was used from very early on as an instrument for a variety of folk and religious songs; and a vast bed of disintegrated carbonates left by the water in its retreat through the great space called the Elfin Ramble.

The cavern is yellow, brown or red because of water, chemicals and minerals. The new stalactites growing from the old, and made of hard carbonates that had already once been used, are usually white as snow though often pink or amber-colored. The Empress Column is a stalagmite 35 feet (11 m) high, rose-colored, and elaborately draped. The Double Column, named from Professors Henry and Baird, is made of two fluted pillars side by side, the one 25 feet (8 m) the other 60 feet (18 m) high, a mass of snowy alabaster. Several stalactites in Giant's Hall exceed 50 feet (15 m) in length. The Pluto's Ghost, a pillar, is a ghostly white.

The cascades are formations like foaming cataracts caught in mid-air and transformed into milk-white or amber alabaster. Brands Cascade is 40 feet (12 m) high and 30 feet (9 m) wide, and is a wax-like white.

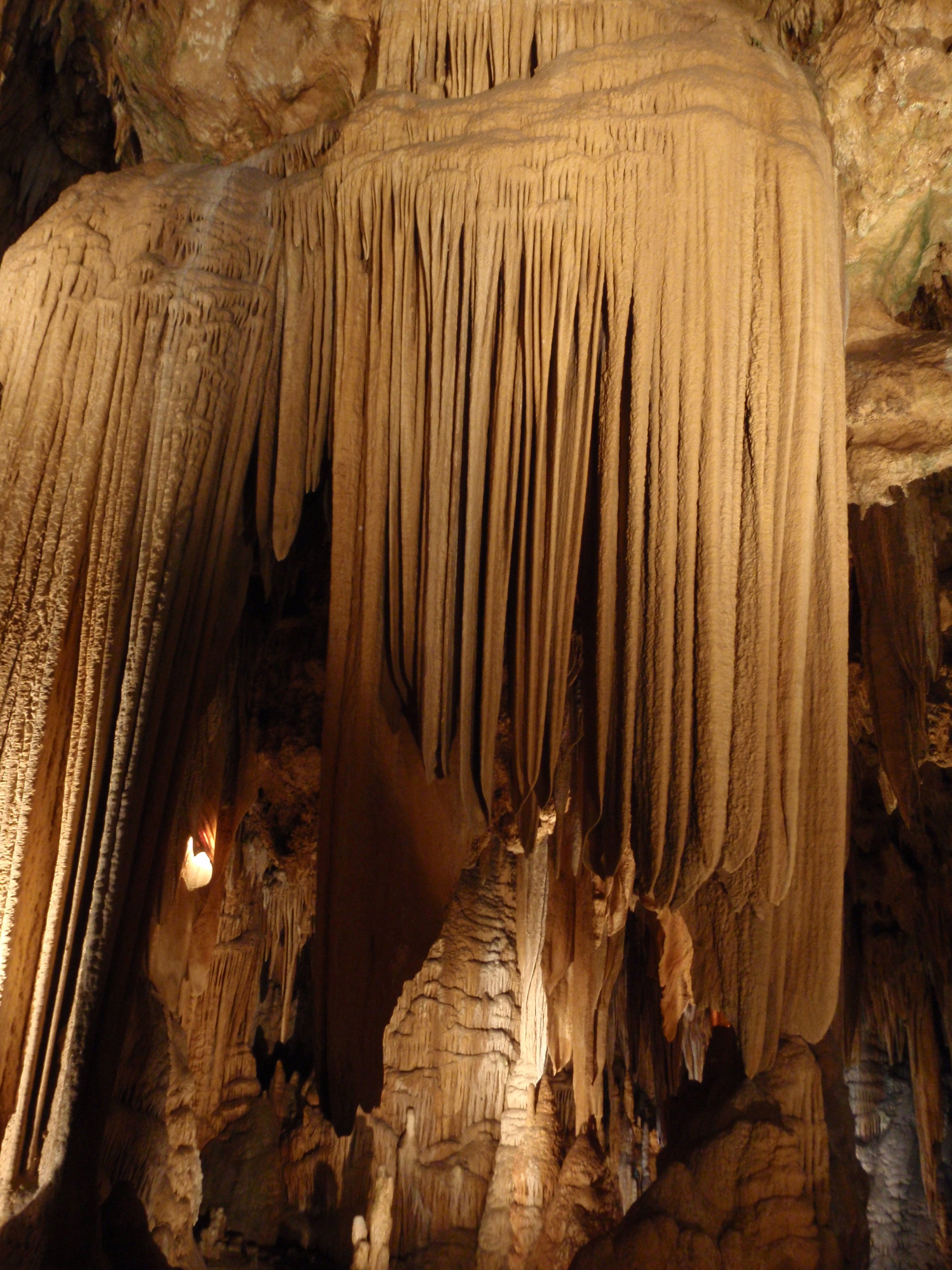
Saracen's tent is considered to be one of the most well-formed draperies in the world

Flowstone draperies are abundant throughout the cavern and one of the best examples is Saracen's Tent. The drapery formation can be found in all major rooms and ring like bells when struck heavily by the hand. Their origin and also that of certain so-called scarfs and blankets is from carbonates deposited by water trickling down a sloping and corrugated surface. Sixteen of these alabaster scarfs hang side by side in Hoveys Balcony, three white and fine as crape shawls, thirteen striated like agate with various shades of brown.

Streams and true springs are absent, but there are hundreds of basins, some of which are 50 feet (15 m) in diameter, and up to 15 feet (5 m) in depth. The water in them contains carbonate of lime, which often forms concretions, called pearls, eggs, and snowballs, according to their size. On the fracture these spherical growths are found to be radiated in structure.

Calcite crystals line the sides and bottom of water-filled cavities. Variations of level at different periods are marked by rings, ridges and ruffled margins. These are strongly marked about Broaddus Lake and the curved ramparts of the Castles on the Rhine. Here also are polished stalagmites, a rich buff slashed with white, and others, like huge mushrooms, with a velvety coat of red, purple or olive-tinted crystals. In some of the smaller basins it sometimes happens that, when the excess of carbonate acid escapes rapidly, there is formed, besides the crystal bed below, a film above, shot like a sheet of ice across the surface. One pool 12 feet (4 m) wide is thus covered so as to show but a third of its surface.

The quantity of water in the cavern varies greatly at different seasons. Hence some stalactites have their tips under water long enough to allow tassels of crystals to grow on them, which, in a drier season, are again coated over with stalactitic matter; and thus singular distortions are occasioned. Contiguous stalactites are often inwrapped thus until they assume an almost globular form, through which by making a section the primary tubes appear. Contorted stalactites may be caused by lateral outgrowths of crystals growing from the side of an active stalactite, or to deflections caused by currents of air, or to the existence of a diminutive fungus peculiar to the locality and designated from its habitat Mucor stalactitis.

The dimensions of the chambers included in Luray Caverns cannot be easily stated, due to the great irregularity of their outlines. There are several tiers of galleries, and the vertical depth from the highest to the lowest is 260 feet (79 m).

=== Luray Cavern waters ===
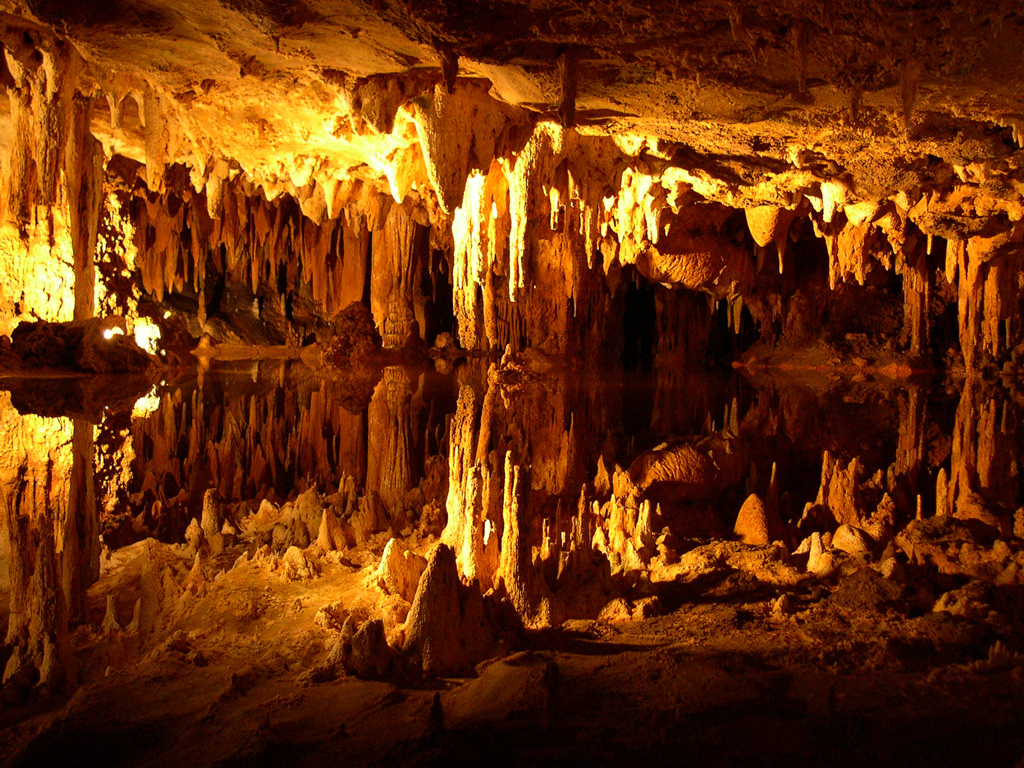
A reflecting lake in Luray Caverns known as Dream Lake

There is a spring of water called Dream Lake that has an almost mirror-like appearance. Stalactites are reflected in the water making them appear to be stalagmites. This illusion is often so convincing that people are unable to see the real bottom. It looks quite deep, as the stalactites are higher above the water, but at its deepest point the water is only around 20 inches (50 cm) deep. The lake is connected to a spring that continues deeper into the caverns.

The Wishing Well is a green pond with coins, three feet (1 m) deep at the bottom. Like Dream Lake, the well also gives an illusion, however it is reversed. The pond looks three to four feet (90 to 120 cm) deep but at its deepest point it is actually six to seven feet (180 to 210 cm) deep.

== In popular culture ==
The 2008 videogame Fallout 3 features a cave system known as Lamplight Caverns. Emil Pagliarulo, one of the developers, stated that Luray Caverns served as a loose inspiration.

== See also ==
- List of National Natural Landmarks in Virginia
