= Slow (DJ) =

Finnish DJ and music producer

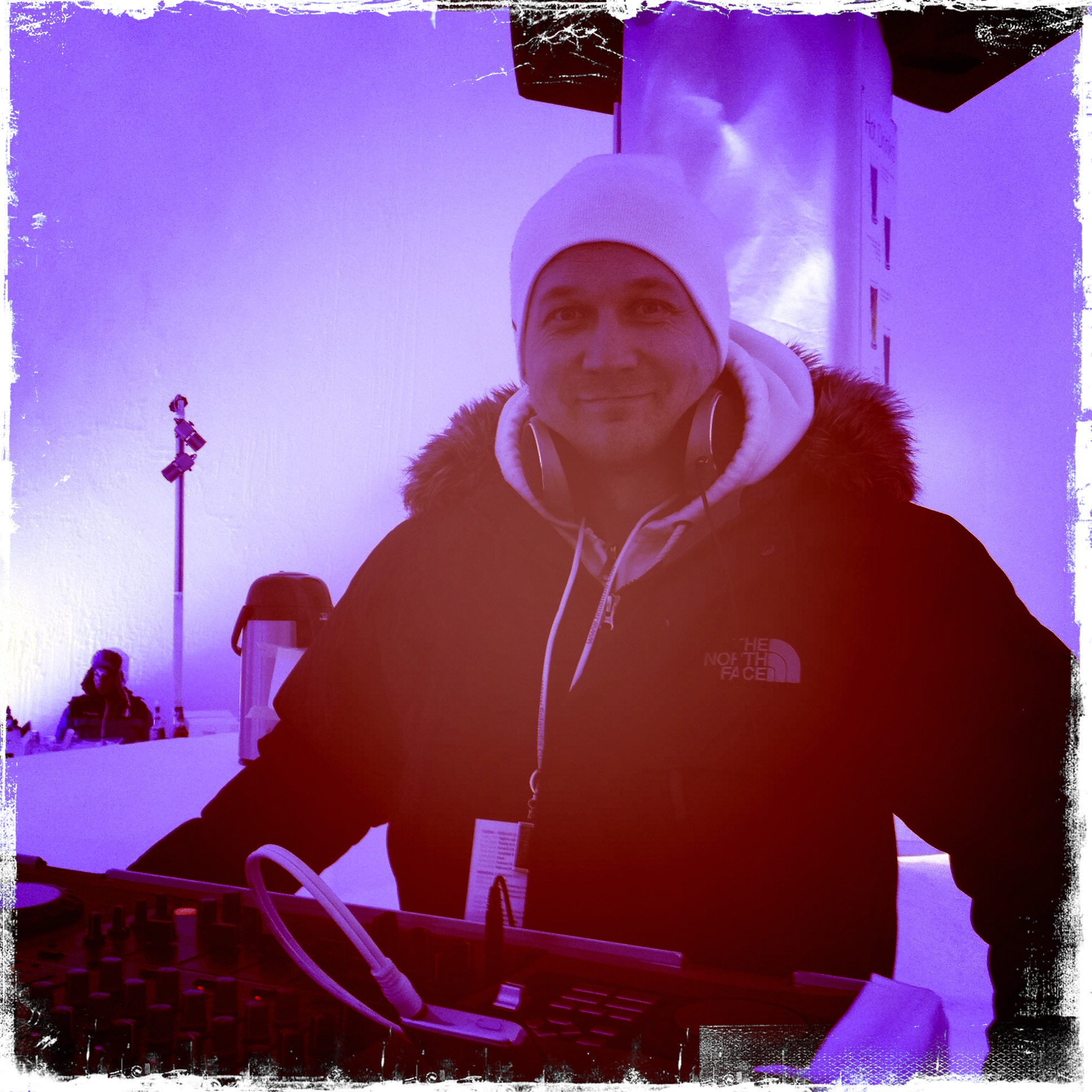
- Slow in 2011

Background information
- Birth name: Vellu Maurola
- Also known as: DJ Slow
- Born: 1975 (age 49–50); Vantaa, Finland
- Genres: Nu jazz, hip hop
- Occupation(s): DJ, record producer
- Years active: since 1992
- Labels: Plastinka, Columbia
- Website: Slow.fi

Slow or DJ Slow (born Vellu Maurola, 1975, in Vantaa, Finland) is a Finnish DJ and music producer. Slow is known for his nu-jazz style and for his production of commercial music for high-profile advertising projects for TV and cinema.

== Career ==
Inspiration from hip hop acts such as Run-DMC, Public Enemy and Eric B & Rakim, led Slow to begin a career in DJing, later making music and remixing other people's tracks. In 1990 Slow met fellow DJ JA-Jazz when they worked together in the music department of a department store. With money from his evening job, Slow bought a pair of Technics turntables and some records.

He participated in the Finnish DMC Mixing Championships and won the contest four years in a row: in 1992, 1993, 1994 and 1995, using two Technics SL-1200 direct-drive turntables and a DJ mixer, with musical styles ranging from hip hop to funk and jazz.

In 1995 Ja-Jazz introduced Slow to James Spectrum, and the three of them formed a band called Pepe Deluxé, playing a mixture of big beat, trip hop, and hip hop. The band's first release was a 1998 EP entitled Three Times a Player, which was chosen as Record of the Month by Muzik magazine. Pepe Deluxé's first full-length album, Super Sound, was released in 1999 by UK's Catskills Records. Due to clearance problems with the samples, they had to produce a new version of the album with many of the tracks rerecorded with cleared samples or live instruments. The new version of the album was released in France, Italy, Spain, The Netherlands, the United States, Australia, and Germany.

One track from the album, "Woman in Blue" (later renamed "Before You Leave"), was chosen to be used for a worldwide advertising campaign for Levi's jeans in 2001. During this time Pepe Deluxe were also asked to do remixes for artists including Tom Jones, The Cardigans, and Eminem. After a lot of promotion and concerts around the world, Slow left the group to pursue solo projects.

Between 1999 and 2001 he worked as Head of A&R at EMI Finland, launching a new dance label called Nozle, which released singles from dance acts such as Campaus, Z-MC, and Jori Hulkkonen's Step Time Orchestra. Campaus was a dance act Slow started with a Finnish producer Rauli Eskolin.

In 2002 Slow formed SlowHill with Finnish saxophonist Tapani Rinne of the band RinneRadio. Fusing jazz sounds with electronic beats, their first album Finndisc was released on Blue Note Records. In the same year, DJ Slow's single "Got to Funk" reached #1 in the Finnish dance chart, and peaked at #19 on the Finnish singles chart. The track was originally made for Hartwall's Upcider drink commercial, but due to positive reception, was eventually released as a single.

In 2003 Slow worked on various remixes such as The Crash's track "Star", and TV scores for Finnish television.

In 2004 Slow released his debut album This Is Now, and began broadcasting a weekly radio show, Burner, on Helsinki's Groove FM with hip-hop artist Paleface.

In 2005 SlowHill released their second album Fennika on Plastinka Records, and remixed BWO's "Sixteen Tons of Hardware". With Tapani Rinne, Slow also wrote the score for Finnish movie Koti-ikävä, which was nominated for a Jussi Award.

In 2006, Slow played a set at Midem International Music Market's 40th anniversary opening night in Cannes. He also released his second album Pronto!, and later that year the album was also released in Japan by Columbia Records. He also played at Wallpaper magazine's design awards in London, the Artek pavilion at Milan's furniture fair, and the Klara Festival in Brussels, and produced music for Nokia, IKEA, and Finlandia Vodka among others.

In 2010 SlowHill returned with their third album, Muzak.

Slow co-produced on "Brujería" on the album Aguilera by Christina Aguilera in 2022.

== Discography ==
=== Albums ===
- 2002 Finndisc (as SlowHill; Blue Note)
  1. "Slowjazz"
  2. "Super Blue"
  3. "Positive"
  4. "Fishbass Fusion"
  5. "Just A Phrase"
  6. "Valo"
  7. "Yesterday Star"
  8. "Small Stone"
  9. "Fragonardo"
  10. "Song For eetu"
- 2004 This Is Now (as DJ Slow; Tiger Helsinki/BMG)
  1. "These Jeans (R Way 2 Hotta!)" featuring L.A. Skin
  2. "Feel The Vibe" featuring Jungle Brothers
  3. "Got To Funk"
  4. "(I'm Over You) Pablo" featuring Teemu Brunila
  5. "Sunshine" featuring Max C
  6. "Top-20 People" featuring L.A. Skin
  7. "Start To Pray"
  8. "Get Down, Give It Up" featuring L.A. Skin and Élancy
  9. "Keep Moving" featuring Midnight Sun
  10. "This Is Now" featuring L.A. Skin and Christa Renwall
- 2005 Fennika (as SlowHill; Plastinka Records)
  1. "Come Back As A Butterfly"
  2. "Fundador"
  3. "Riekko"
  4. "Everyone Is A Star"
  5. "La Noche En La Isla"
  6. "Ammulla/Illalla"
  7. "Thursday"
  8. "Fennika"
  9. "Lost Friends"
  10. "Niko's Dream"
- 2006 Pronto! (as Slow; Plastinka Records)
  1. "Suite No. 431"
  2. "Little By Little"
  3. "Back In L.A."
  4. "Sambesque Tin-Tin"
  5. "Track Down Pronto!"
  6. "Fall Upon Love"
  7. "Again And Again"
  8. "Carnivále Mystique"
  9. "Lullaby At 8:45pm"
- 2010 Muzak (as SlowHill; Universal Music)
  1. "Tenho"
  2. "Parasol"
  3. "Finnlite"
  4. "Pohjalo"
  5. "Shine"
  6. "Le Vapour"
  7. "Toiset Meistä"
  8. "Saunatheque"
  9. "Utu"
  10. "Sshhh"

=== Singles ===
- 2001 : SlowHill : "Super Blue" (Blue Note)
- 2003 : Paleface with DJ Slow : "Wannabe MC" (BMG)
- 2003 : Paleface with DJ Slow : "Til The Break Of Dawn" (BMG)
- 2003 : DJ Slow : "Got To Funk" (Tiger Helsinki/BMG)
- 2004 : DJ Slow : "These Jeans (R Way 2 Hotta!)" (Tiger Helsinki/BMG)
- 2004 : DJ Slow : "Keep Moving" (Tiger Helsinki/BMG)
- 2004 : DJ Slow : "(I'm Over You) Pablo" (Tiger Helsinki/BMG)

=== Compilations ===
- 2005 Various Artists Eat&Joy vol.1, mixed and compiled by DJ Slow (Plastinka Records)
  1. SlowHill : "La Noche En La Isla"
  2. Husky Rescue : "Rainbow Flows"
  3. ToneKroup : "Mood Division"
  4. Lightman : "Oil On Canvas"
  5. ACCU : "Out Of the Blue"
  6. Teddy Rok Seven : "Feel" (featuring Okou) 4:36
  7. Korpi Ensemble : "Everything’s All Right"
  8. Infekto : "Beautiful" (Instrumental)
  9. Ro*danmaa : "Track 7"
  10. Quintessence : "Friday"
  11. Jazzgangsters : "Feeling Sad Tonight"
  12. Uusi Fantasia : "Fantasia"
