= Huldufólk 102 =

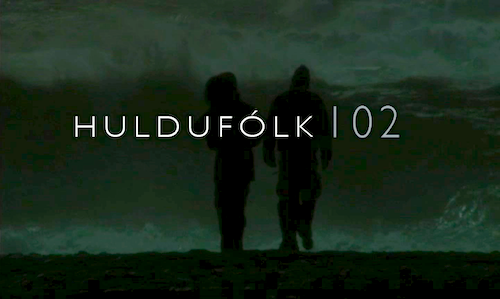
- Directed by: Nisha Inalsingh
- Produced by: Nisha Inalsingh; Júlíus Kemp; Ingvar Þórðarson
- Cinematography: Sean Kirby
- Edited by: Scott Crary
- Music by: Amiina; Björk múm Sigur Rós
- Production companies: Middle Link; Kisi ehf.
- Release date: April 5, 2006
- Running time: 75 minutes
- Countries: United States; Iceland
- Languages: English; Icelandic

Huldufólk 102 is a 2006 American/Icelandic co-production documentary film directed by Nisha Inalsingh about the cultural phenomenon of the Huldufólk (or "hidden folk"), mystical beings traditionally believed by many Icelanders to inhabit a parallel world hidden in the rocks and stones of the harsh Icelandic landscape.

== Release ==
The film debuted at the 2006 Sarasota Film Festival and additionally won the Audience Award at the 2006 Camden International Film Festival.

The film premiered in Iceland at the Reykjavik Art Museum on January 31, 2008.

== Soundtrack ==
The documentary's soundtrack features many noted Icelandic bands and artists, such as Sigur Rós, múm, and Björk.

== See also ==
- Investigation into the Invisible World, a 2002 documentary film
