= Finnish Music Information Center =

Finnish Music Information Centre (Fimic) was an organization dedicated to the promotion and archiving of Finnish music. A member of the International Association of Music Information Centres (IAMIC), the International Association of Music Libraries (IAML) and the International Association of Sound and Audiovisual Archives (IASA), Fimic hosts a vast library of scores, parts, and recordings, and distributes unpublished sheet music. The organization covers nearly all genres of Finnish music, ranging from contemporary classical compositions to rock and folk music.

"We provide information on Finnish music and musical life. Our clients include orchestras, musicians, composers, conductors, the media, researchers, students and other individuals and bodies actively concerned with music. The Centre is a service outlet for information about Finnish music in the form of sheet music, sound recordings and printed materials. We hire, lend and sell sheet music not in print, answer inquiries, and maintain sound and press cutting archives. We also run a reference library on Finnish music. (...) We have a wide network of contacts and can quickly put you in touch with the right person, however specialised your problem. The Centre has for some years now been issuing a series of leaflets on Finnish composers. These leaflets consist of an essay followed by a selected list of works and discography. In some cases there is also a video available. We also publish detailed catalogues of works and booklets on various aspects of music. One of our goals for the near future is to build up an extensive data bank on Finnish music." (Fimic information, before 2003.)

Music Export Finland Association (MUSEX) and Finnish Music Information Center Fimic (Fimic) merge in 2012 to form Music Finland.
