= Jean-Michel Roux =

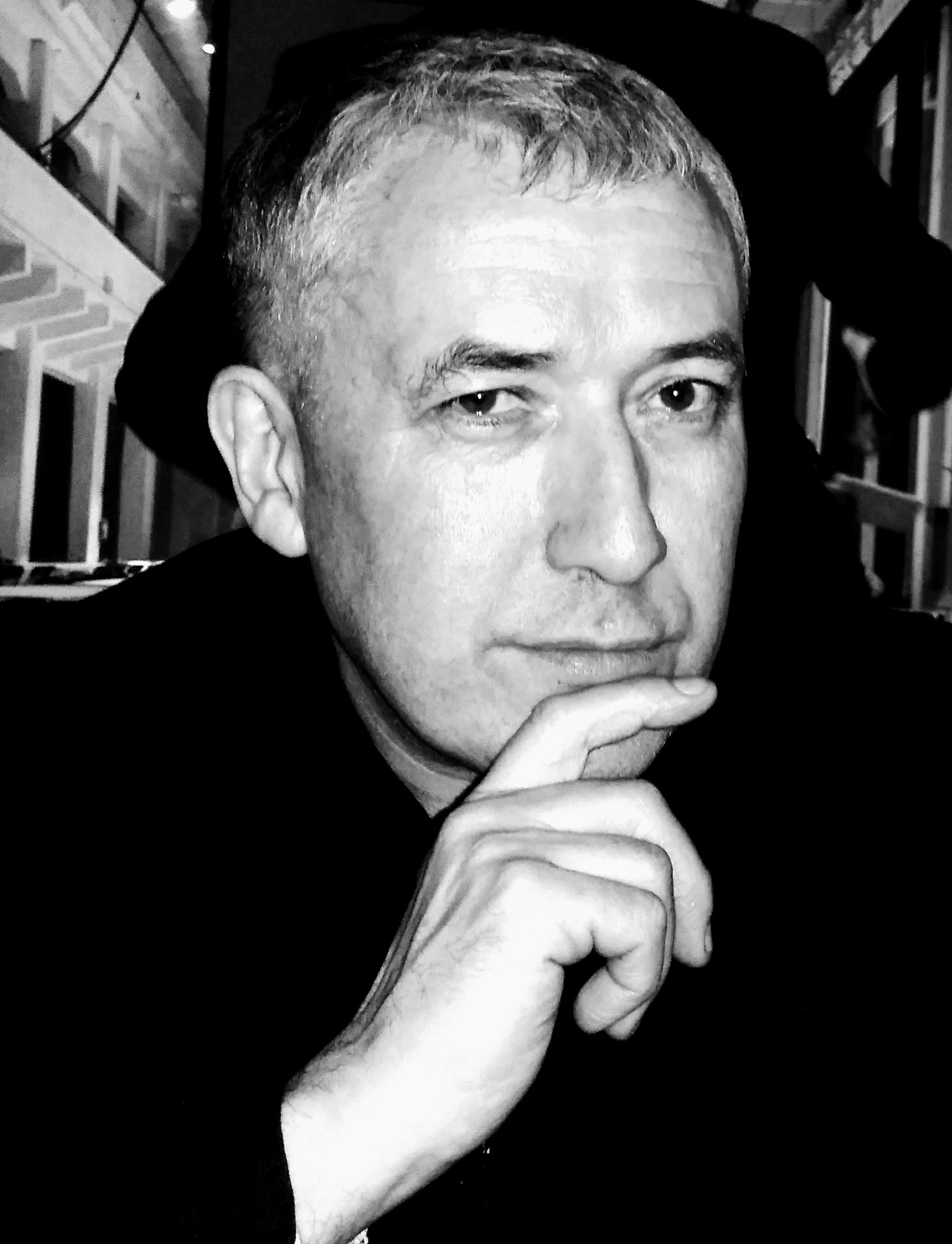

Jean-Michel Roux (born 8 May 1964 in Nancy, France) is an autodidactic script-writer and film-maker.

== Biography ==
Jean-Michel Roux began his career with films in the fantasy genre and also science fiction films. Passionate about the mysteries of life and the invisible world, he went on to direct documentary films in Northern European countries.

The Thousand Wonders of the Universe has received Jury prizes at The Swedish Fantastic Film Festival in Malmo and at the Fantafestival in Rome and Investigation into the Invisible World has been selected at the Sundance Film Festival for best documentary.

Angel of the North, a documentary on the human soul, angels and the beyond, was released in theatres in Finland. It was nominated for the best feature documentary category at the Jussi Awards 2018 (the Finnish Oscars).

== Filmography ==
- 1984: Wild District (Quartier sauvage) – short film
- 1987: The Voice of the Desert (La voix du désert) – short film
- 1992: Too Near the Gods (Trop près des dieux) – short film
- 1997: The Thousand Wonders of the Universe (Les Mille Merveilles de l'univers) – feature film
- 1997: Elfland – documentary
- 2002: Investigation into the Invisible World (Enquête sur le monde invisible) – documentary
- 2009: The Mysteries of Snæffellsjökull (Les Mysteres du snæffellsjökull) – documentary
- 2009: The Heart of the Earth (Le Cœur de la terre) – short film
- 2017: Angel of the North (L'Ange du Nord) – documentary film
