= Angel of the North (film) =

2017 Finnish documentary film by Jean Michel Roux

- Directed by: Jean Michel Roux
- Written by: Jean Michel Roux
- Produced by: Making Movies: Kaarle Aho, Kai Nordberg Mezzanine Films: Mathieu Bompoint
- Cinematography: Joonas Pulkkanen
- Edited by: Denis Bedlow
- Music by: Tapani Rinne, Biosphere, Sibelius, Rautavaara, Seidlæti, Sverrir Gudjónsson, the Residents, Huutajat, Lama Gyurme & Jean-Philippe Rykiel
- Release date: September 27, 2017 (Helsinki International Film Festival)
- Running time: 89 min
- Countries: Finland; France
- Languages: Finnish, English

Angel of the North (original Finnish title: Pohjolan Enkeli) is a 2017 Finnish documentary film directed by Jean Michel Roux. It was produced by Making Movies, distributed in Finland by SCANBOX and nominated at The Jussi awards 2018 (the Finnish Oscars) in the category "Best feature documentary". The film is inspired by the Finnish painting by Hugo Simberg, The Wounded Angel.

Angel of the North is the first Finnish long feature directed by a French film-maker.

== Plot ==
Angel of the North is based on Hugo Simberg's painting: The Wounded Angel. It depicts two teenagers carrying a wounded angel on a stretcher in a barren landscape.

Since its creation in 1903, this work, elected "the most beloved" by the Finns, has become a national enigma because the painter has never provided an explanation for it.

For 89 minutes, people of all ages and all walks of life ponder and give their personal explanation : children, artists, farmers, a priest, a paramedic, a handicapped person, a therapist...

It raises questions about death and the afterlife, Nordic melancholy, art, the existence of angels and hope.

The scene of the painting is reconstructed with actors, and at the end of the film, like a sequel to the painting, the angel is taken by the two boys on a boat to a distant shore. Northern lights against a backdrop of starry night skies illustrate the closing credits.

== Production ==
Angel of the North is a Finnish-French co-production directed by Jean-Michel Roux. For the Finnish part, film was produced through Making Movies OY, and co-produced by French production company Mezzanine Films.

The production of the film was supported by the Finnish Film Foundation and financed by the Finnish TV companies : YLE, ERR.

== Release ==
The film premièred at Helsinki International Film Festival on 21 September 2017, and screened at São Paulo Mostra in Brazil on 24 October 2017.

Angel of the North was officially released in Finland by distribution company Scanbox on 14 November 2017.

The film was nominated for the Jussi Awards 2018 (The Finnish Oscars) in the section Best Documentary Film.
