= Pepe Deluxé =

Finnish music group

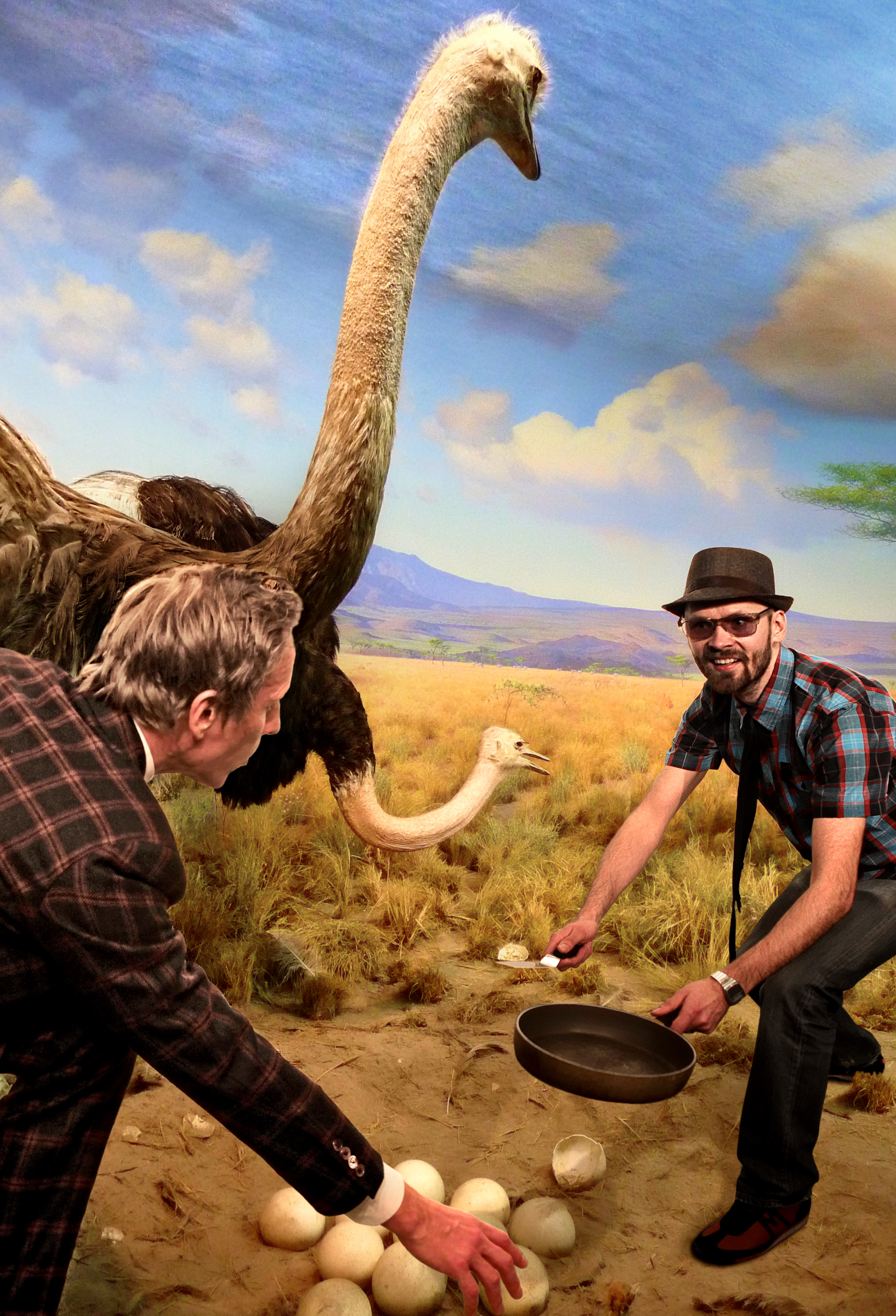
- Pepe Deluxé's Paul Malmström (left) and James Spectrum

Background information
- Origin: Helsinki, Finland
- Genres: Electronica; trip hop; big beat; hip-hop; breakbeat; neo-psychedelia
- Years active: 1996–present
- Labels: Catskills Records; Emperor Norton Records; Asthmatic Kitty
- Members: James Spectrum; Paul Malmström
- Past members: DJ Slow; JA-Jazz
- Website: Official website

Pepe Deluxé is a Finnish music group, formed in 1996 by DJ Slow (Vellu Maurola) JA-Jazz (Tomi Castrén, formerly Paajanen) and James Spectrum (Jari Salo) in Helsinki, Finland. They started to experiment with sounds of hip-hop, big beat, breakbeat and downtempo. With the 2007 release Spare Time Machine the band gave up on sampling and concentrated on vintage music styles including psychedelia, baroque pop and surf rock. DJ Slow left the band in 2001 to pursue solo projects. JA-Jazz has been off-duty since 2008. Multi-instrumentalist Paul Malmström became an official member of the band in 2008.

The Pepe Deluxé live line-up consists of Mirkka Paajanen (vocals), Miikka Paatelainen (guitar, theremin), Markku Reinikainen (drums), Ville Riippa (keyboards), James Spectrum (mixing, percussion) and Edward Greendanger (VJ).

== History ==
The band's first release was a song called "Call Me Goldfinger". It was released in 1997 on the "Return of the DJ, Vol. II" scratch-DJ compilation album by Bomb Hip-Hop Records. After the release, the band continued making new Pepe Deluxé -music and also remixes for Finnish dance music artists.

The band's first EP, Three Times a Player, 1998, was actually a demo released under an imaginary record label Tiger. It was still chosen as the downtempo album of the month by Muzik magazine in the UK. This led to a recording contract with Brighton's Catskills Records.

The band's first album, Super Sound, was released 1999. Due to clearance problems (the tracks were heavily sampled), they had to do a new version of the album with many of the tracks re-created with cleared samples or with live instruments. The new version of the album was released subsequently in France, Italy, Spain, The Netherlands, United States, Australia and Germany. The album was selected as an "Album of the Month" by several magazines.

Super Sound was noticed by Paul Malmström from Fallon Worldwide advertising agency in New York, and the band was asked to write music for an upcoming Lee Jeans advertisement campaign. Later on, Pepe Deluxé's sound was also noted by another jeans company, Levi's, which chose the track "Before You Leave" (based heavily on an original composition by Tony Hatch) for their worldwide advertising campaign in 2001, subsequently winning the Gold Lion for best use of music in Cannes Lions International Advertising Festival. The track reached No. 20 in the UK Singles Chart the same year, and it was also used on the end credits for the Channel 4 comedy quiz show, Alan Carr's Celebrity Ding Dong.

During this time, Pepe Deluxé undertook several remixes for acts such as Tom Jones, The Cardigans, Eminem and Jacknife Lee.

In 2003, the band returned with their first single "Salami Fever" from their second album Beatitude. It was composed together with Paul Malmström and it was their first collaboration. They also created a video for the single (showing a master training an apprentice in martial arts using salami and bacon), which was chosen as 'Video of the Decade' by Bizarre magazine. "Salami Fever" was sampled by The Prodigy on their songs "Take Me to the Hospital" in 2009 as well as "Get Your Fight On" in 2015. That same year, their song "Everybody Pass Me By" was featured in the Disney film Holes.

In spring 2007, they released the first single, "Pussy Cat Rock", from their third album Spare Time Machine, the latter of which was released in June 2007. Further singles "Mischief Of Cloud 6" (August) and "Go For Blue" (September) followed.

In October 2007, "Mischief Of Cloud 6" was used at the beginning of an episode of the ABC drama Private Practice, entitled "In Which Addison Finds the Magic".

In October 2011, Asthmatic Kitty announced that they would be releasing the fourth Pepe Deluxé album in conjunction with Catskills. The esoteric pop opera in three parts was titled Queen of the Wave. It was released in January 2012.

Pepe Deluxé composed the soundtrack for the Angry Birds Go! racing game released in December 2013.

In 2019 Pepe Deluxé issued the single "The Surrealist Woman", a one-off release designed to soundtrack the graphic novel adaptation of the un-made film collaboration between The Marx Brothers and Salvador Dali, "Giraffes on Horseback Salad", which was released on a strictly limited 7 inch single.

Phantom Cabinet Vol. 1, the follow-up to Queen of the Wave, was released on Catskills Records worldwide on October 22, 2021. The album continued Pepe Deluxé's endless search for rare, unused or forgotten instruments from around the world, including Boardwalk Hall Auditorium Organ, the Sexophone and The World's Largest Cowbell.

Pepe Deluxé's latest album, Comix Sonix, was released on June 21, 2024.

== Discography ==
=== Albums ===
- Super Sound (Catskills Records/Emperor Norton, 1999)
- Beatitude (Catskills Records/Emperor Norton, 2003)
- Spare Time Machine (Catskills Records, 2007)
- Queen of the Wave (Catskills Records/Asthmatic Kitty, 2012)
- Phantom Cabinet Vol. 1 (Catskills Records, 2021)
- Comix Sonix (Catskills Records, 2024)

=== Singles ===
List of singles, with selected chart positions
Title	Year	Peak chart positions						Album
Title	Year	FIN	AUS	FRA	ITA	SWI	UK	Album
"Before You Leave"	2001	10	50	36	28	78	20	Super Sound
"Salami Fever"	2003	—	—	—	—	—	—	Beatitude
"Pussy Cat Rock"	2007	—	—	—	—	—	—	Spare Time Machine
"Mischief of Cloud 6"	2007	—	—	—	—	—	—	Spare Time Machine
"Go for Blue"	2007	—	—	—	—	—	—	Spare Time Machine
"The Surrealist Woman"	2019	—	—	—	—	—	—	Non-album single

=== Remixes ===
- Tom Jones & the Cardigans - "Burning Down the House (Pepe Deluxé Mix)" (1999)
- Jacknife Lee - "Bursting off the Backbeat (Pepe Deluxé Mix)" (1999)
- Bad Meets Evil - "Nuttin' to Do (Pepe Deluxé Dub)" (2001)
- Oiling Boiling - "Cyclops Dance (Pepe Deluxé Remix)" (2001)
- Giant Robot – Helsinki Rock City (Interstellar Overdrive Mix) Remix – Pepe Deluxé (2002)
- Black Grass - "Going Home (Pepe Deluxé Remix)" (2004)
- Don Johnson Big Band - "Busy Relaxin' (Pepe Deluxé Refix)" (2006)

=== Soundtrack Albums ===
- Angry Birds Go! (Original Game Soundtrack) (2013)
- Angry Birds Go! (Original Game Soundtrack Extended Edition) (2013) (Note: is missing two tracks from the original version)
- Giraffes on Horseback Salad (2019)
