= Edward Vesala =

Finnish jazz drummer (1945–1999)

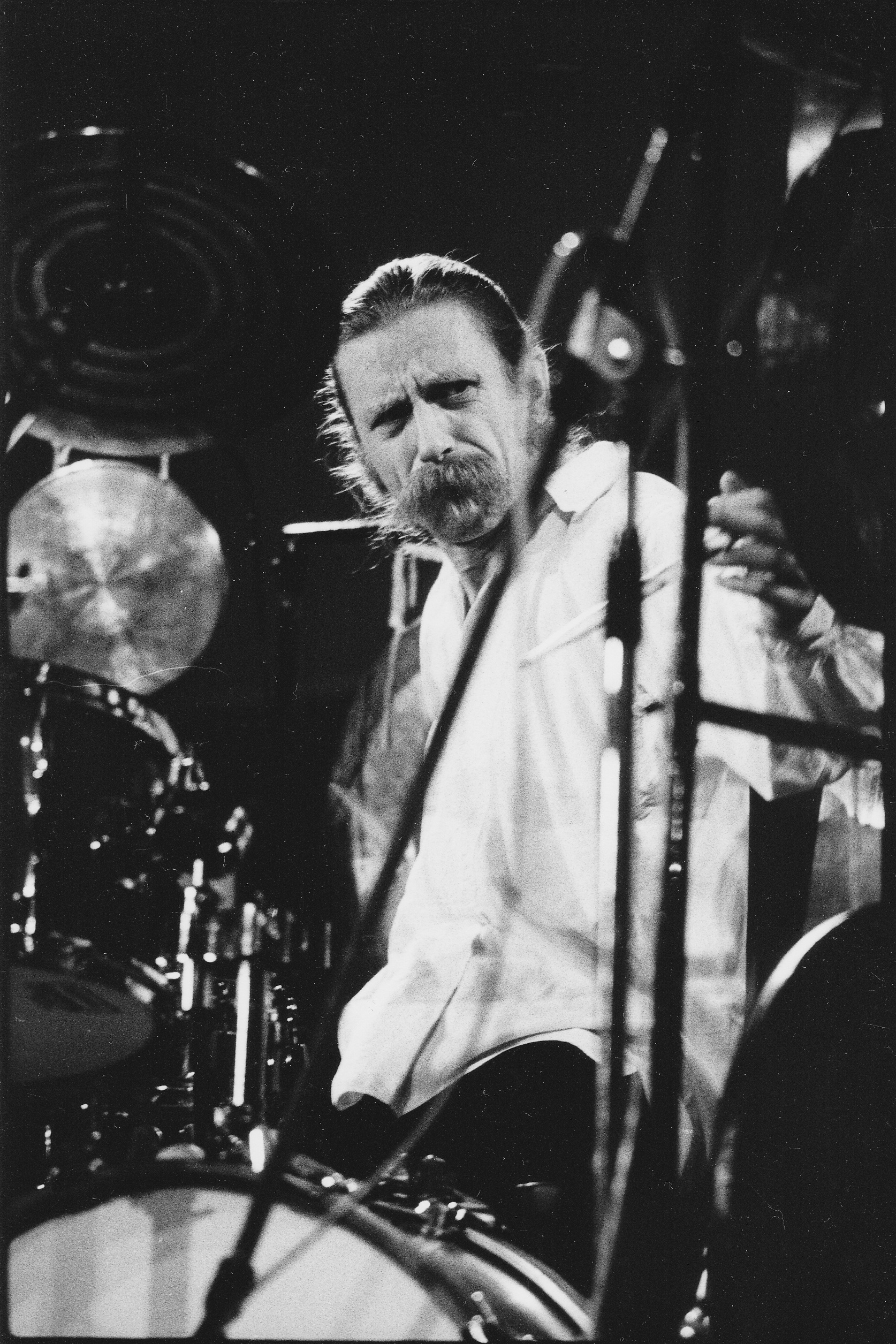
- Edward Vesala in concert, International Jazz Festival, Prague, Lucerna Music Hall, 1984

Background information
- Born: Martti Vesala; 15 February 1945; Mäntyharju, Finland
- Died: 4 December 1999 (aged 54) Yläne, Finland
- Genres: Jazz
- Occupations: Musician, composer
- Instrument: Drums
- Years active: 1960s–1999
- Label: ECM

Edward Vesala (15 February 1945 – 4 December 1999), born Martti Vesala, was a Finnish avant-garde jazz drummer.

== Career ==
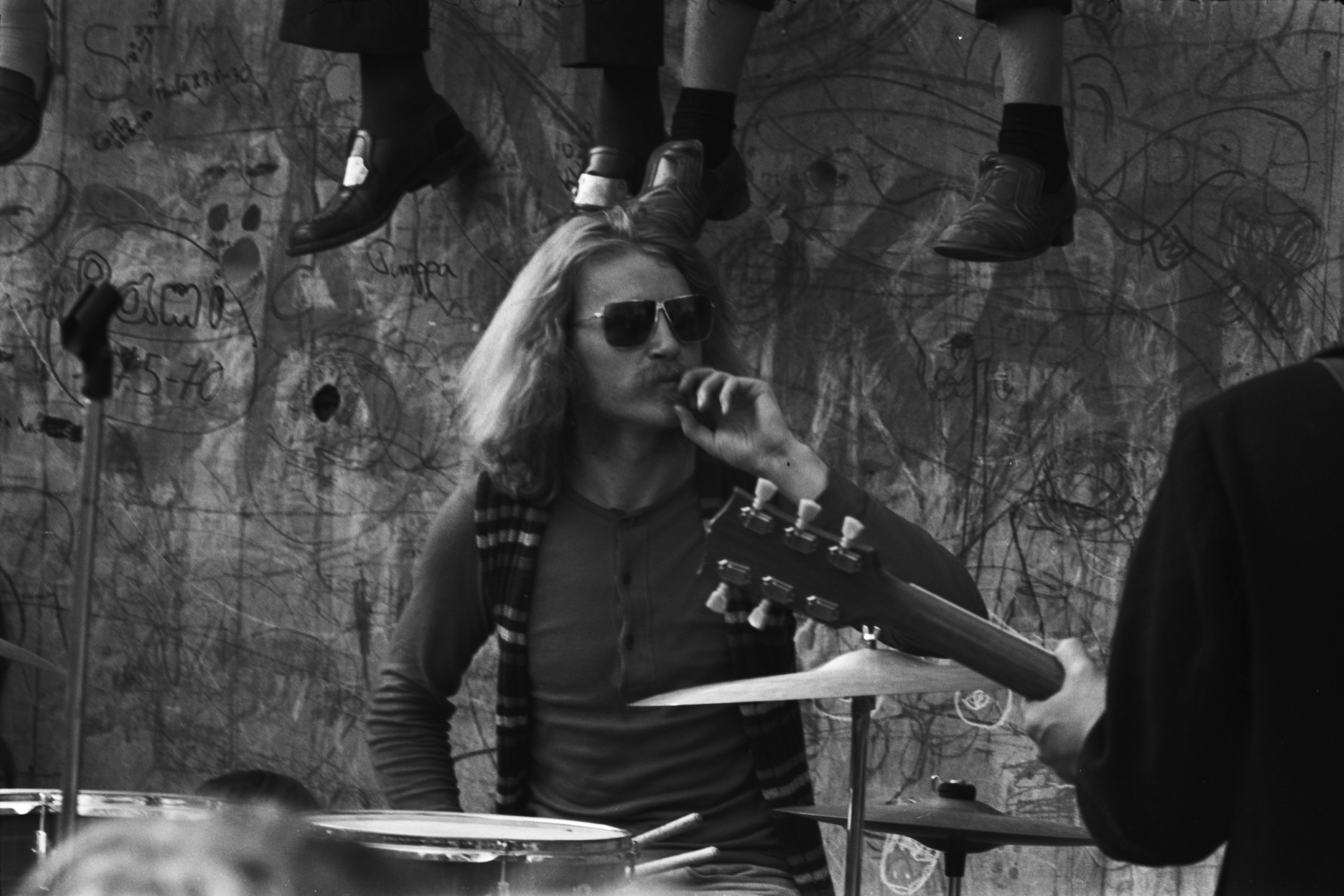
Vesala playing with Apollo in Karhupuisto, May 1970

Born in Mäntyharju, he began playing jazz and rock in the 1960s, in such bands as Blues Section and Apollo. In the 1970s, he led his own jazz groups, a quartet with Polish trumpet player Tomasz Stańko and sax player Tomasz Szukalski, played with Toto Blanke's Electric Circus, and recorded with Norwegian saxophonist Jan Garbarek. In the 1980s and 1990s, Vesala recorded several albums of his own compositions that combined jazz, classical music, tango, and folk music with his own group Sound & Fury, an ensemble of about ten players made up mostly of Vesala's students. Prominent players in Sound and Fury included saxophonists Jorma Tapio and Pepa Päivinen, guitarists Raoul Björkenheim and Jimi Sumén, and harpist and keyboardist Iro Haarla, who was Vesala's wife.

Vesala died from congestive heart failure in Yläne, Finland at the age of 54.

== Discography ==
=== As leader or co-leader ===
- Nan Madol (ECM, 1974)
- Satu (ECM, 1977)
- Open (FMP, 1979) with Gerd Dudek and Buschi Niebergall
- Heavy Life (Leo, 1980)
- Lumi (ECM, 1986)
- Ode to the Death of Jazz (ECM, 1989)
- Invisible Storm (ECM, 1991)
- Nordic Gallery (ECM, 1994)

=== As sideman ===
With Jan Garbarek

- Triptykon (ECM, 1973)

With Tomasz Stańko

- TWET (Polish Jazz vol. 39) (Polskie Nagrania Muza, 1974)
- Balladyna (ECM, 1976)
- Live at Remont (Helicon, 1976)
- Almost Green (Leo, 1978)

With Kenny Wheeler

- Around 6 (ECM, 1979)
