= Battle of Hyvinkää =

1918 battle of the Finnish Civil War

- Part of the Finnish Civil War
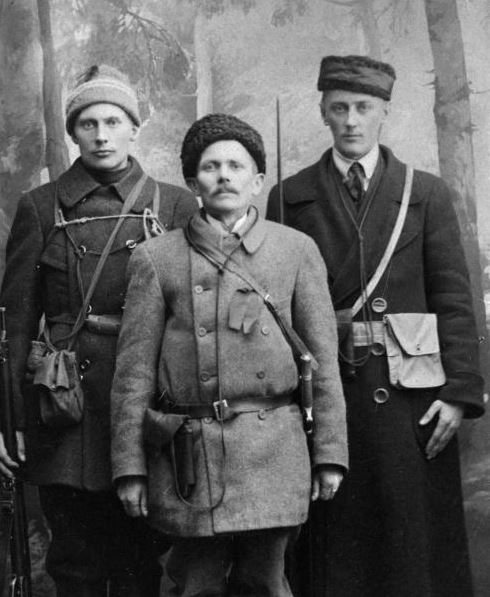
- Oskari Koivula, commander of the Hyvinkää Red Guard (front) and Emil Ylén (left) in 1918
Date	19–21 April 1918 (2 days)
Location	Hyvinkää, Finland 60°37′49″N 24°51′32″E
Result	German victory

Belligerents
German Empire	Finnish Reds

Commanders and leaders
(German Empire) Konrad Wolf	Oskari Koivula; Topias Harju; Jalmari Ranta

Strength
c. 3,000 Germans	300–500 in the combat units

Casualties and losses
21 Germans killed	c. 50 killed or executed
- Location within Finland Battle of Hyvinkää (Europe)

The Battle of Hyvinkää was fought during the Finnish Civil War on 19-21 April 1918, when troops from the German Baltic Sea Division marching from Helsinki conquered the locality from the Reds who had held it for three months. The Germans attacked Hyvinkää from three directions; from the direction of Klaukkala and Nurmijärvi via the Hanko railway line and along the Tuusula highway and mainline. The main defense positions of the Reds were along the Hanko track in Hyvinkäänkylä, after which fierce battles took place in the station area. After the well-taken invasion, a bloody follow-up began, with Whites executing about 150 Reds, actual or suspected, during May.

== Background ==
When the Civil War broke out, Hyvinkää was a municipality of about 8,000 inhabitants, which had become independent of the Nurmijärvi parish a year earlier. Since the turn of the century, the locality had been divided into wealthy landowners and civil servants, as well as workers who had come to the locality by rail and industry. Hyvinkää's largest employer was the United Wool Mills (Yhdistyneet Villatehtaat). Until the general strike of 1905, the Nurmijärvi parish was dominated by local landowner families, but with the social upheaval, the labor movement also gained influence. After the general strike of November 1917, the municipal administration of Hyvinkää gradually passed to the Reds, and power finally came into their hands by mid-February 1918. During the rule of the Reds, a total of 16 Whites were killed in Hyvinkää. Red Guards from elsewhere were also involved in the bloodshed.

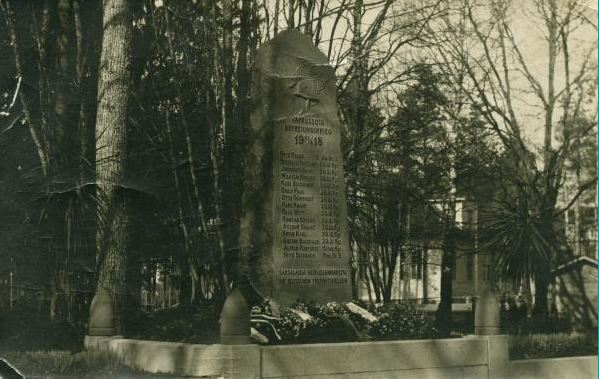
Grave of the German soldiers killed in the Battle of Hyvinkää.

After the German Baltic Sea Division landed in Hanko on April 3, it progressed along Rantarata to Helsinki, which was conquered on April 13. At the same time, the Germans also took over the villages of Tikkurila and Malmi along with the parish of Helsinki and along the Main Railway. After the Battle of Helsinki, the Germans continued north on April 19 towards Tuusula, Kerava and Hyvinkää. From the German Baltic Division, the 95th Reserve Infantry Brigade, led by Major General Konrad Wolf, took part in the battle, consisting of three Jaeger battalions, reinforced by three bicycle companies and two machine gun units, as well as artillery and an armored train. The Germans had divided their troops into three parts. The main group led by Major Godert von Reden, the department supporting Klaukkala and Nurmijärvi in the direction of the Hanko railway, and a bicycle company along the Main Railway, accompanied by a self-built armored train, departed from the church village of Helsinki parish.

== Battle ==
=== Progression of German troops towards Hyvinkää ===
The main defense stations of the Reds who defended Hyvinkää were along the Hanko railway in Hevosmäki, Hyvinkäänkylä, on the west side of which the Vantaa River flowed. In addition, there were smaller departments further along the Hanko railway in Noppo and Nurmijärvi's Rajamäki, along the Main Railway in Palopuro and along the road to Tuusula in the Pengarkoski rapids of Nukari. The troops of Hyvinkäänkylä were supported by an artillery battery and the Panssarijuna No. 5 armored train.

On the morning of April 19, a German vanguard led by Major Lothar von Brandenstein set out for Tuusula, where Count von Plessen's squadron was involved in an all-day battle against the Reds. In Tuusula, the squadron was transformed into a squadron led by Count zu Solms-Baruth, who by the evening managed to advance less than ten kilometers to Jäniksenlinna, north of Tuusula. On the Main Railway, the Germans reached Kerava, where a battle broke out against the Reds supported by the armored train. Eventually, the Reds noticed one German department advancing by road from the east of Kerava towards Järvenpää, and ended the siege to avoid retreating to Hyvinkää. After this, the Germans were free to proceed five kilometers to Palopuro, south of Hyvinkää railway station. However, they had to give up their armored train even before the village of Jokela, when the Reds blew up the railway bridge over the Palojoki River.

The next morning the fighting took place in Palopuro, Pengarkoski, and Noppo, during which the western department of the Germans reached Rajamäki, from where the Reds now began to evacuate their troops and family members towards Hyvinkää. In the Pengarkoski, the Reds withdrew from the battle before noon, which opened a free road for the Germans to the Noppo station north of Rajamäki. This allowed them to cut off the track and interrupt the evacuation of the Reds so that only one train had time to get through. At about 5 pm, the second train from Rajamäki was stopped before Noppo, when the Reds who traveled there set out to flee towards Kytäjä. They were followed by a German division, against which at least 16 Red Guards fell in a battle in the village of Herunen.

In the evening, two German departments began advancing from Noppo towards Hyvinkää. However, the Reds were in good defensive positions on the ridge of Hevosmäki, which forced the Germans to stay in positions behind the Vantaa River flooded in front of Kriss Manor. The area was fought until midnight, but to get ahead, the Germans would have had to cross rail and road bridges mined by the Reds. As a result, they decided to regroup their troops for attack the next morning. Additional troops were brought to the scene so that in the end there was about a battalion of Germans. In addition, three cannon batteries were grouped in the fields of Uusikartano.

=== Battle in the town ===
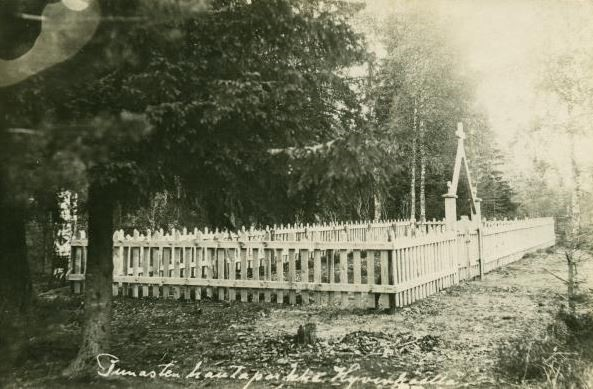
Mass grave of the Reds killed in the Battle of Hyvinkää.

On the morning of April 21, the German attack was launched with artillery concentration that started at 7 o'clock, targeting the Red defenses at the southern end of Hevosmäki in Åvik. The Reds managed to repel the enemy's first breakthrough attempt, but the Germans managed to cross the Vantaa River a couple of kilometers east along the Rantala Bridge in Kittelä, which had been left unguarded. The Germans were now advancing towards the back of the enemy, and the Reds had no opportunity to send free reserves to combat the hook. The Reds decided to leave their position and withdraw from Hyvinkäänkylä towards the station area four kilometers away. At the same time, the Germans started another siege movement when a department led by cavalry master Ehrenkrook circled from the east via the Ridasjärvi village towards Hyvinkää station. Around the Majamäki school, the Germans faced the Reds who defended the eastern direction, retreating only after less than three hours of fighting. Battles were also fought in Palopuro, from where the Reds withdrew to Hyvinkää at the same time as Majamäki.

Eventually, the Germans managed to attack the railway station area from three different directions. In the station village, they faced fierce resistance and had to move from house to house, fighting the reds defended from their own basements. The severity of the resistance is explained by the fact that the evacuation of Hyvinkää, which was started by the Reds immediately after the break-in Hevosmäki's defense, was still badly in progress. Their families were taken to safety on the roads to Hausjärvi and Riihimäki, where the people were also evacuated by train. The aftermath of the Reds and the armored train on the railway managed to delay the Germans so that they did not take over Hyvinkää until between 4 pm and 5 pm when the locality had already been almost completely emptied of the Reds. The armored train managed to cause losses to the Germans in Välenoja, in the present-day Paavola district.

After the battle ended, some of the Germans continued towards Riihimäki until late that evening. One department arrived in Herajoki at 10 pm, where it got into a battle with the Reds grouped in Riihimäki's defense. A department led by Major von Reden marched towards the Erkylä village in Hausjärvi, where it was ambushed by the Reds at 11 p.m. Six Germans and four Reds fell in the battle of Erkylä. The third German department was able to proceed without resistance to Kerkkola near the Monni's railway stop. However, the majority of Germans spent the night in the Hyvinkää station village and did not continue to Riihimäki until the next morning. The conquest of Riihimäki was completed later that afternoon.

== Casualties ==
In the Battle of Hyvinkää, 21 Germans and at least 50 Reds fell. In addition, the battle claimed at least two civilian casualties when the mother and son died in German artillery fire.

== Memorials ==
Of the Germans soldiers who fell in Hyvinkää, 15 have been buried in a park opposite the Hyvinkää railway station, which also has a monument. It was unveiled on the anniversary of the conquest of Hyvinkää on April 21, 1921. A representative of the German embassy spoke at the ceremony.

== See also ==
- Battle of Helsinki
- Battle of Lahti

== Sources ==
=== Further reading ===
- Kronlund, Jarl (1986). "Tiede ja ase Vol 44". Tiede Ja Ase. Hyvinkää itsenäisyyssodassa. Helsinki: Suomen Sotatieteellinen Seura: 154–205. ISSN 0358-8882.
- Ylitalo, Essi (2011). "Innokas punikki". Hyvinkään punakaartilaisnaiset sisällissodan jälkiselvittelyissä 1918. Helsinki: Helsingin yliopiston Valtiotieteellinen tiedekunta.
- Muistitietoja vuosien 1917-18 tapahtumista Hyvinkäällä. Hyvinkää: Keräystoimikunta. 1971.
- Tukkinen, Tauno (2002). "Kadonnut kapinassa". Hyvinkään punaisten henkilötappiot 1918. Karjalohja: TT. ISBN 951-98363-4-9.
