= Hyvinkää (disambiguation) =

Hyvinkää is a town and municipality in Finland.

Hyvinkää or Hyvinkään may also refer to:

- Hyvinkää Church
- Hyvinkää Airfield
- Hyvinkää railway station
- Hanko–Hyvinkää railway
- Hyvinkää shooting
- Hyvinkään Palloseura, a football club
- Hyvinkään Tahko, a sports club
