= Jokela Prison =

Prison in Tuusula, Finland

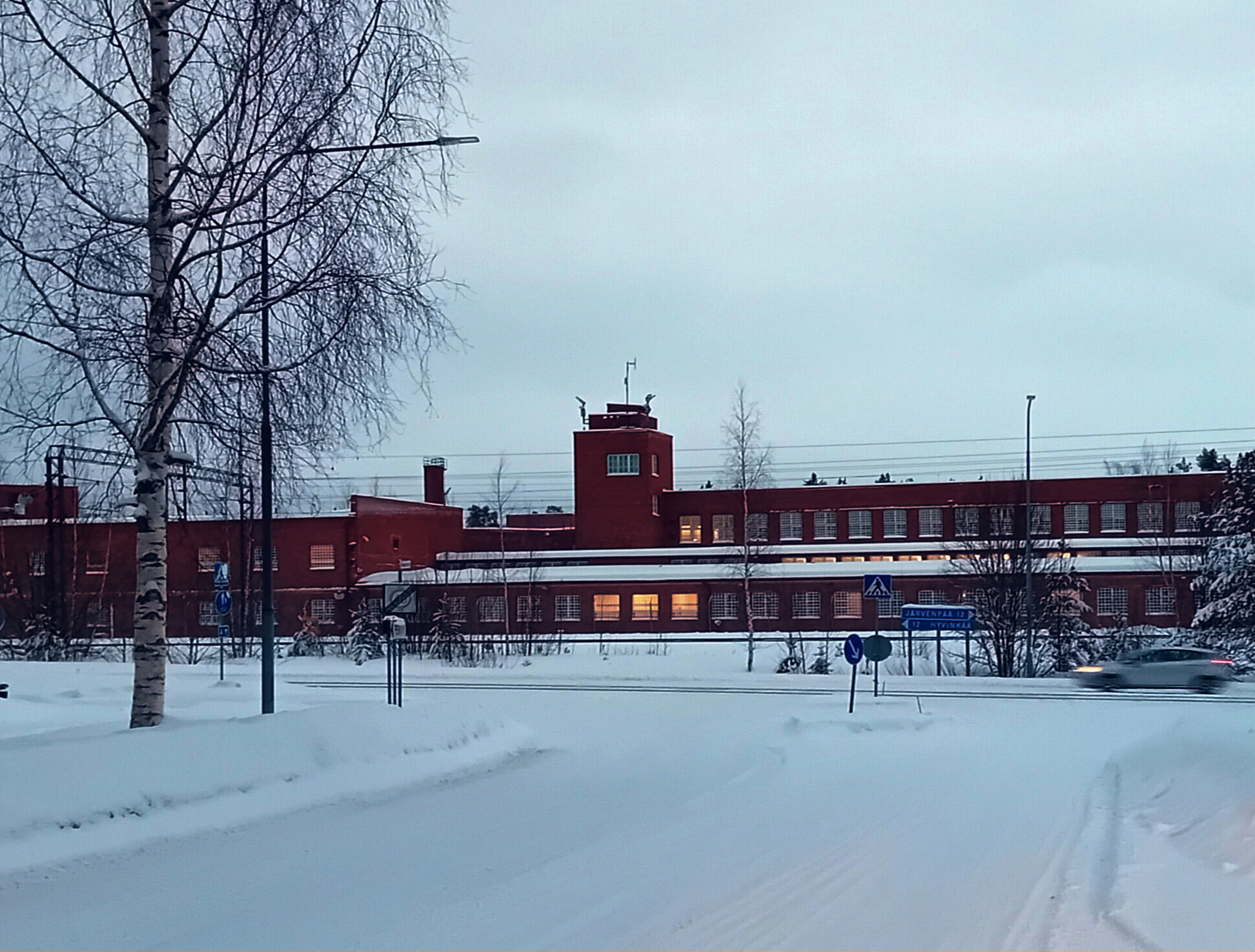
- Interactive map of Jokela Prison
- Location: Jokela, Tuusula, Finland; 60°33′02.77″N 24°58′37.74″E
- Status: Operational
- Capacity: 124 (84 in closed ward, 40 in open prison)
- Opened: 1993
- Director: Jouko Pietilä

The Jokela Prison (Finnish: Jokelan vankila) is a prison located near the Jokela railway station in the Jokela village of Tuusula, Finland, opened in 1993. The prison is part of Southern Finland's criminal sanctions area maintained by the Criminal Sanctions Agency.

The capacity of prison is 84 in the closed ward and 40 in the open prison outside the wall. About one third of the prison's inmates are of foreign origin. About 90 people work in Jokela prison, most of them in surveillance and prisoner transport. In Jokela prison's work activities, inmates do various packing and assembly jobs as well as clothing maintenance. In addition, in Jokela prison, inmates can complete the Valma training, which prepares them for vocational studies and working life, organized by the Spesia vocational college.

The prison has a prison shop open to the public, where products made by inmates are sold.

== See also ==
- Prisons in Finland
