= Nuppulinna railway station =

Railway station in Tuusula, Finland

Nuppulinna
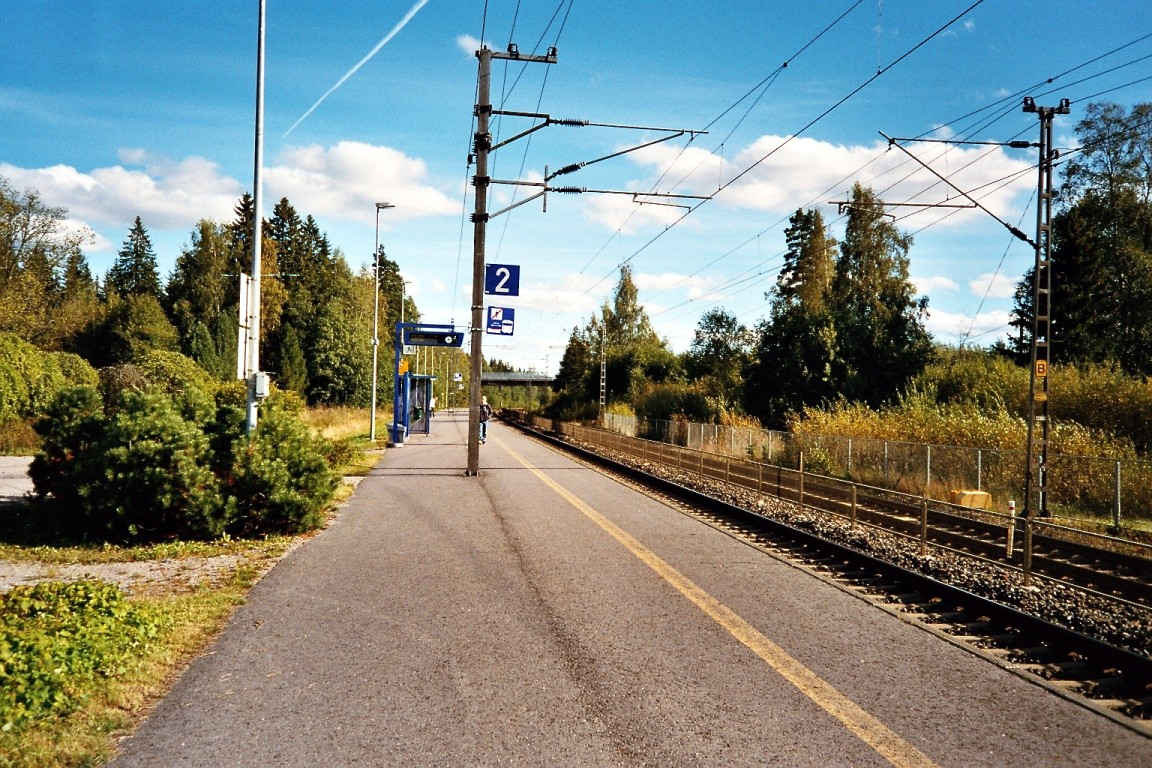

General information
- Location: Nuppulinnanmutka 56, 05430; Nuppulinna, Tuusula; Finland
- Coordinates: 60°31′45″N 025°01′10″E
- System: VR station
- Owner: Finnish Transport Agency
- Operator: VR Group
- Line: Helsinki–Riihimäki
- Platforms: 2 side platforms
- Tracks: 2

Construction
- Architect: Jarl Ungern

Other information
- Station code: Nup
- Classification: Halt

History
- Opened: 1886
- Closed: 27 March 2016

Passengers
- 2015: 154 daily

Discontinued services
Preceding station	Helsinki commuter rail	Following station
Purola towards Helsinki	H	Jokela towards Riihimäki
Location

Nuppulinna (Finnish: Nuppulinnan seisake, Swedish: Nuppulinna hållplats) is a closed railway station in Tuusula, Finland. It was located along the Helsinki–Riihimäki railway, and its neighboring stations at the time of closing were Purola in the south and Jokela in the north.

== History ==
Nuppulinna was founded as a platform (Finnish: laituri) in 1886. It received its first station building in 1922 with the transfer of an old station house from Käpylä; it was then replaced by a brand new building designed by Jarl Ungern in 1930. The Finnish state had gained possession of the lands of Nuppulinna during the land acquisition operations related to the imminent building of the Helsinki–Hämeenlinna railway, and it became home to the official gardening facilities of the Finnish State Railways in the 1950s. The farmlands' significance for this purpose grew further in the 1960s as the FSR built a new greenhouse in Nuppulinna in 1962, where it then transferred the operations of its former garden in Hyvinkää. This garden was closed in 2002, due to the lowering demand for its services, coinciding with the number of stations decreasing. Nuppulinna was again made an unstaffed halt in 1972 and its station building was demolished in 1995. The former cross-platform pedestrian level crossing was replaced by an underpass in 1999.

In 2015, the Finnish Transport Agency, in a study concerning proposals for new halts on the Helsinki–Riihimäki and Kerava–Lahti sections, explored the possibility of closing the Nuppulinna and Purola stations in an effort to ease the capacity shortage on the railway, which would then help with the prospects of increasing services and the number of stops. In response to the FTA's inquiry for statements on the results of the study, the municipalities of Tuusula and Järvenpää opposed the proposal. Tuusula's statement said that should the halts be closed, the platforms should be preserved in anticipation of a possible reopening in the future.

The final train at Nuppulinna stopped at 6:02 on 27 March 2016.

== Services ==
Until its closing, Nuppulinna was served by line H on the Helsinki commuter rail network.
