= Jukka Tolonen =

Finnish jazz guitarist (born 1952)

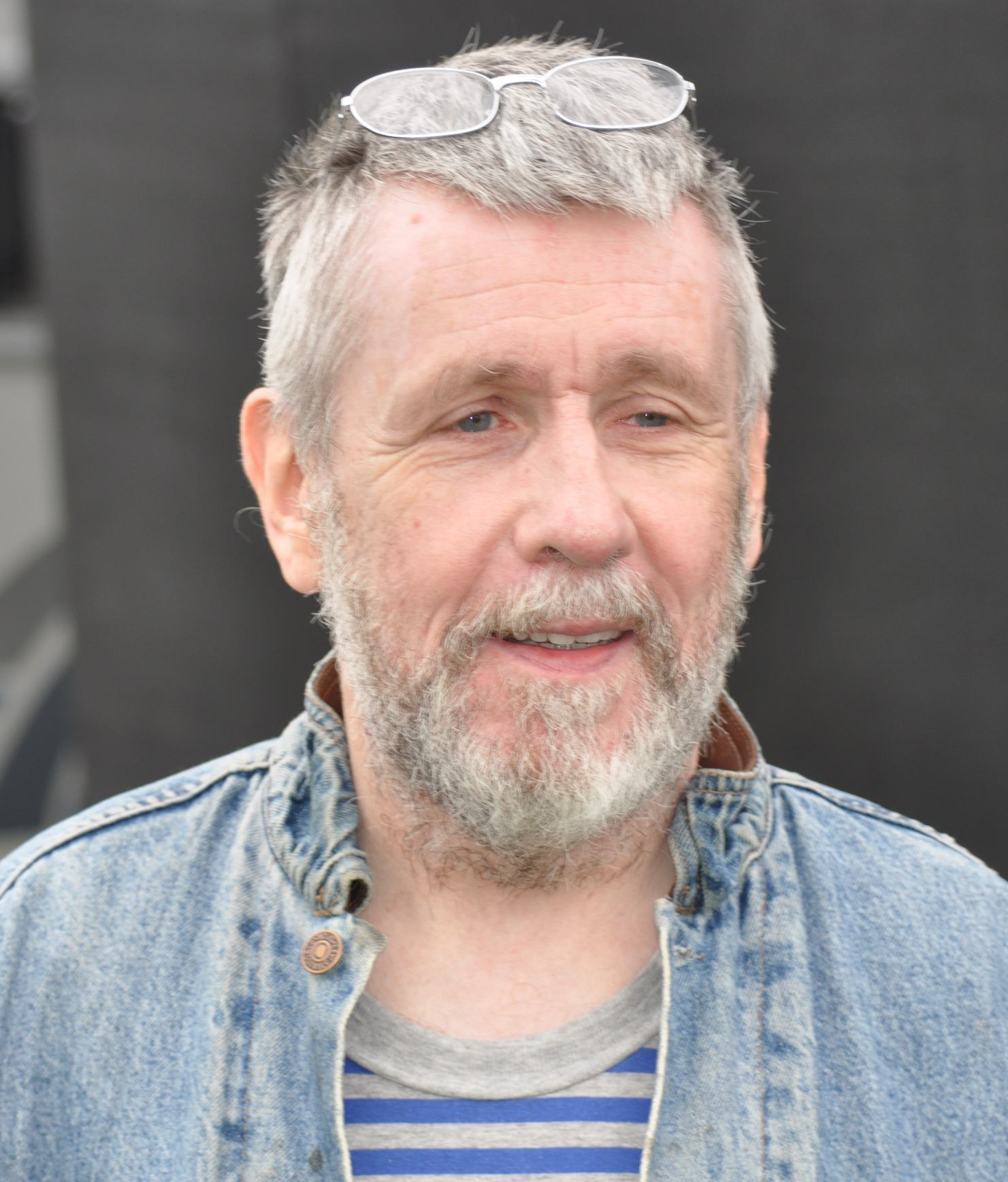
- Tolonen in 2012

Background information
- Born: Jukka Jorma Tolonen; 16 April 1952 (age 74)
- Origin: Helsinki, Finland
- Genres: Progressive rock, jazz, jazz rock, blues rock, hymns
- Instruments: Guitar, piano
- Years active: 1966–present
- Formerly of: Tasavallan Presidentti

Jukka Jorma Tolonen (born 16 April 1952) is a Finnish guitarist. Tolonen became famous as guitarist for the progressive rock band Tasavallan Presidentti (which means "president of the republic").

== Career ==
He had grown up playing the piano, but received his first guitar at age eleven. From 1966 to 1967 Tolonen, at age fourteen, played guitar with Arto Sotavalta and the Rogues. Their first single, recorded in 1967, was "Ei maitoa tänään," backed by "Lady Jane." For several months in 1969 he was a member of Eero Raittinen's band Help, which eventually split up. Then Tolonen and drummer Vesa Aaltonen founded the group Tasavallan Presidentti, with whom he toured and recorded several albums from 1969 to 1974. Their third album, Lambertland, reached number seven on the Finnish charts in 1972, followed by Milky Way Moses, which peaked at number twelve in 1974. Tolonen also played on albums Tombstone Valentine (1970) and Fairyport (1971) by Wigwam.

His first solo album, Tolonen!, recorded and released in 1971 while he was nineteen years old, displayed his prowess on both guitar (electric and acoustic) and piano, and instrumental songwriting which comfortably segues between classical, jazz, folk, blues, and rock. Tolonen! peaked at number six on the Finnish charts in 1971, winning the Finnish Broadcasting Company's Album of the Year disk. In 1972 he married Taija Sippola, his girlfriend of several years, and studied piano and composition at the Sibelius Academy in Helsinki while continuing to perform and record. Tolonen's guitar solo on "Paratiisi", a hit single from Rauli 'Badding' Somerjoki's 1974 album Näin käy rock & roll, made it the most played song on Finnish radio for three subsequent years. Tasavallan Presidentti broke up in 1974 just before it was to embark on a US tour in support of Kraftwerk. "Windermere Avenue", a song from Tolonen's 1975 Hysterica album, became a minor radio hit in the USA. Also in 1975 he was asked to join ABBA as a touring musician, but he declined, due to the birth of his first child, Dimitri, and his concurrent solo career.

Tolonen is a virtuoso guitarist, who is highly respected in his native Finland as well as in Sweden, where he has lived for long periods. Among Tolonen's side projects are Guitarras Del Norte, Trio Tolonen, and Jukka Tolonen Band (JTB). He has used many different guitars over the years, such as the Gibson ES-335 and Ibanez Artist. Since the 1990s he has used Finnish handmade instruments by Ruokangas Guitars (electric) and Lottonen Guitars (acoustic).

Despite his earlier successes, Tolonen was eventually twice divorced, homeless, and drug-addicted. In May 2008 Tolonen was found guilty of stabbing his girlfriend and was sentenced to 27 months in jail for aggravated assault. When released in 2010, he told the media that he was quitting guitar playing due to osteoarthritis. While in prison Tolonen dedicated his life to Jesus Christ, and in 2011 he released Juudan Leijona ("Lion of Judah"), a CD of traditional Finnish hymns, in which he sings and plays piano, occasionally accompanied by other instruments and voices. He continues to perform live concerts of Christian music on piano along with other musicians and vocalists.

On 2 May 2014 Gateway Films released Tolonen, a career-spanning documentary. A concurrent Tolonen CD was issued, featuring many young Finnish jazz and rock musicians' interpretations of Tolonen's songs. In autumn 2014 he played guitar for the first time in many years (and sang) on the album Sokea Joe by Kari Peitsamo. The same year he began to receive a State Arts Pension in Finland for meritorious activities of a creative or performing artist. Tolonen is actively involved with the Siion Pentecostal Church in Töölö, Helsinki, and has enrolled in a local Bible Institute. In 2017 he began to perform on bass guitar in live concerts as part of the Ramblin' Jazz Quartet in Finland.

In December, 2019 Jukka Tolonen alternated between bass guitar and piano for two concerts in Helsinki celebrating the 50th anniversary of Tasavallan Presidentti along with several of his old bandmates and additional personnel.

== Discography ==
- Tasavallan Presidentti - Tasavallan Presidentti (1969)
- Wigwam - Tombstone Valentine (1970)
- Wigwam - Fairyport (1970)
- Tasavallan Presidentti - Magneettimiehen kuolema (With Pekka Streng) (1970)
- Jukka Tolonen - Tolonen! (1971)
- Tasavallan Presidentti - Tasavallan Presidentti (II) (1971)
- Tasavallan Presidentti - Lambertland (1972)
- Jukka Tolonen - Summer Games (1973)
- Rauli "Badding" Somerjoki - This is Rock and Roll (1974)
- Tasavallan Presidentti - Milky Way Moses (1974)
- Jukka Tolonen - The Hook (1974)
- Charlie Mariano - Reflections (1974)
- Nordic Jazz Quintet - Nordic Jazz Quintet (1975)
- Jukka Tolonen - Hysterica (1975)
- Eero Koivistoinen - The Front is Breaking (guitar solo on "Mean Meat Blues") (1975)
- Jukka Tolonen - Crossection (all previously released tracks) (1976)
- Jukka Tolonen - Impressions (all previously released tracks) (1977)
- Jukka Tolonen Band - A Passenger to Paramaribo (1977)
- Jukka Tolonen/Christian Sievert - After Three Days (1977)
- Jukka Tolonen - Mountain Stream 1978
- Jukka Tolonen Band - Montreux Boogie Live (1978)
- Jukka Tolonen - High Flyin (1979)
- Jukka Tolonen Band / JTB - Just Those Boys (1979)
- JTB - Dums Have More Fun (1980)
- Jukka Tolonen/Coste Apetrea - Touch Wood (1980)
- Jukka Tolonen - In a This Year Time (1981)
- Tolonen/Apetrea - Blue Rain (1982)
- Oreo Moon - Walk Don't Scream (1983)
- Remu - Live at Cafe Metropol (1985)
- Bill's Boogie Band - Live and Lively at Cafe Metropol Helsinki (1985)
- Jukka Tolonen - Radio Romance (1985)
- Tolonen/Christian Sievert - Still Friends (1986)
- Piirpauke - Zerenade (1987)
- Jukka Tolonen Classics - The Rarest (1989)
- Jukka Tolonen Trio - Last Mohican (1990)
- Tasavallan Presidentti - Classics (compilation) (1990)
- Jukka Tolonen Trio - Big Time (1994)
- Jukka Tolonen Trio - Mr. Big Foot (1995)
- Pedro's Heavy Gentlemen - Reggae (1996)
- Jukka Tolonen - On the Rocky Road - A Retrospective (1997)
- Tasavallan Presidentti - Still Struggling For Freedom (2001)
- Guitarras del Norte – Guitarras del Norte (2004)
- Jukka Tolonen - Cool Train – Tolonen plays Coltrane (2004)
- Eddie Boyd in Finland – Mello' Hello! (rec. 1970–1984, rel. 2005)
- Tasavallan Presidentti - Tasavallan Presidentti Six (2005, EP)
- Tasavallan Presidentti - Six Complete (2006)
- Jukka Tolonen - Juudan Leijona (2011)
- (composer only) - Tolonen (2014)
- Kari Peitsamo - Blind Joe (2014)
