= The Hook (album) =

Studio album by Jukka Tolonen
- Released: 1974
- Recorded: August 5–11
- Studio: Marcus Music AB in Stockholm
- Length: 36:11
- Label: Love
- Producer: Måns Groundstöm

Jukka Tolonen chronology
Summer Games (1973)	The Hook (1974)	Hysterica (1975)

The Hook is the third studio album by guitarist Jukka Tolonen, released in 1974 through Love Records; a remastered edition was reissued in 2004.

== Track listing ==
All tracks are written by Jukka Tolonen.

No.	Title	Length
1.	"Aurora Borealis"	12:56
2.	"Starfish"	6:17
3.	"The Sea"	8:22
4.	"The Hook"	8:36
5.	"Together"	3:16
Total length:		39:28

== Personnel ==
- Jukka Tolonen – guitar, piano
- Esa Kotilainen – Minimoog, clavinet, accordion
- Esko Rosnell – drums, percussion
- Heikki Virtanen – bass
- Seppo Paakkunainen – baritone saxophone
- Jan Kling – tenor saxophone
- Pekka Pöyry – alto saxophone, soprano saxophone, flute
- Torgny Nilsson – trombone
- Bertil Löfgren – trumpet
- Måns Groundstöm – production
