= Yrjö Saarinen (painter) =

Finnish painter (1899–1958)

Yrjö Vihtori Saarinen (13 December 1899 – 9 January 1958) was a Finnish self-taught painter. In 1955, he was awarded the Pro Finlandia Medal and granted an artists' pension by the Finnish government. The novelist Mika Waltari, who collected Saarinen's works, also helped him financially. At times, Saarinen supported himself by painting billboards and signs.

Saarinen's work includes figure paintings, portraits, landscapes and still lifes.

The Hyvinkää Museum of Art in Southern Finland has a collection of about 200 paintings and 60 drawings by Yrjö Saarinen.
