= Katri Rosendahl =

Finnish equestrian

Personal information
- Born: November 1984 (age 41) Hyvinkää, Finland
- Occupation: Endurance Rider

Horse racing career
- Sport: Horse racing

Katri Rosendahl (born November 1984), is a Finnish endurance rider from Hyvinkää in southern Finland. She has been an endurance rider since the late 1990s and competed at the international level since 2003. She reached the top position in 2007 when she became the national champion for endurance riding in Finland.
