= Hysterica (album) =

Studio album by Jukka Tolonen
- Released: 1975
- Recorded: Marcus Music AB in Stockholm
- Genre: Jazz fusion
- Length: 37:43
- Label: Love
- Producer: Otto Donner

Jukka Tolonen chronology
The Hook (1974)	Hysterica (1975)	Crossection (1976)

Hysterica is the fourth studio album by guitarist Jukka Tolonen, released in 1975 through Love Records; a remastered edition was reissued in 2004.

== Overview ==
Hysterica is more rock-oriented than its jazz fusion predecessor, The Hook. "Jimi" and "Django" are tributes to guitarists Jimi Hendrix and Django Reinhardt, respectively. "Silva the Cat" features synthesisers emulating the mewling of a cat, whereas the flutes evoke graceful feline movements. "Tiger" displays muscular, hard rock guitar improvisation. Closing the album is "Windermere Avenue", a mid-tempo pop song with tinges of country blues in Tolonen's lead guitar. It became a minor hit on Finnish radio in 1976, whereupon it was reissued on the compilation LP Crossection. The song is a paean to the idyllic quietude of the street, which is some ten kilometres north of central London, in the borough of Barnet.

== Track listing ==
All tracks are written by Jukka Tolonen

No.	Title	Length
1.	"Jimi"	9:30
2.	"Django"	2:34
3.	"Hysterica"	6:33
4.	"Tiger"	7:02
5.	"Silva the Cat"	4:49
6.	"Windermere Avenue"	7:15
Total length:		37:43

== Personnel ==
- Jukka Tolonen – guitar, piano (track 6)
- Esa Kotilainen – synthesizer, clavinet, organ
- Esko Rosnell – drums, percussion
- Heikki Virtanen – bass (except track 4)
- Pekka Pohjola – bass (track 4)
- Pekka Pöyry – alto saxophone, soprano saxophone, flute (except track 4)
- Sakari Kukko – soprano saxophone, flute (track 4)
- Otto Donner – production
