= Prisons by country =

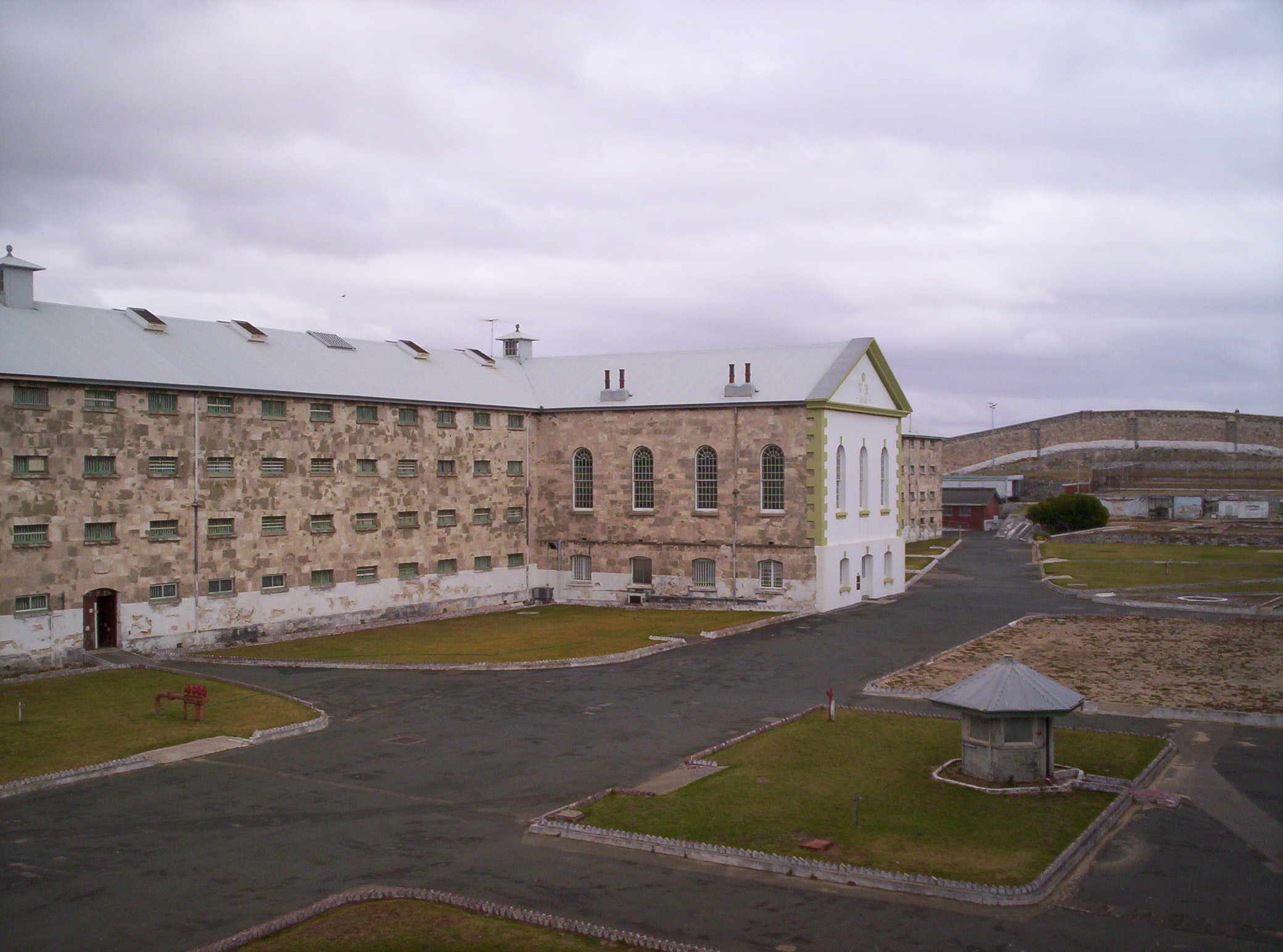
The main cell block of the retired Fremantle Prison, Western Australia

== Asia and Oceania ==
=== Australia ===
Many prisons in Australia were built by convict labour in the 19th century. During the 1990s, various state governments in Australia engaged private sector correctional corporations to build and operate prisons whilst several older government run institutions were decommissioned. Operation of federal detention centres was also privatised at a time when asylum seekers began to be mandatorily detained in Australia.

=== China ===
China's prison population is estimated at 2 million.

=== India ===
Prison in India, and its administration, is a state subject covered by item 4 under the state list in the Seventh Schedule of the Constitution of India. The management and administration of prisons falls exclusively in the domain of the State Governments, and is governed by the Prisons Act, 1894 and the Prison Manuals of the respective State Governments. Thus, states have the primary role, responsibility and authority to change the current prison laws, rules and regulations. The Central Government provides assistance to the states to improve security in prisons, for the repair and renovation of old prisons, medical facilities, development of borstal schools, facilities to women offenders, vocational training, modernization of prison industries, training to prison personnel, and for the creation of high security enclosures.

=== New Zealand ===
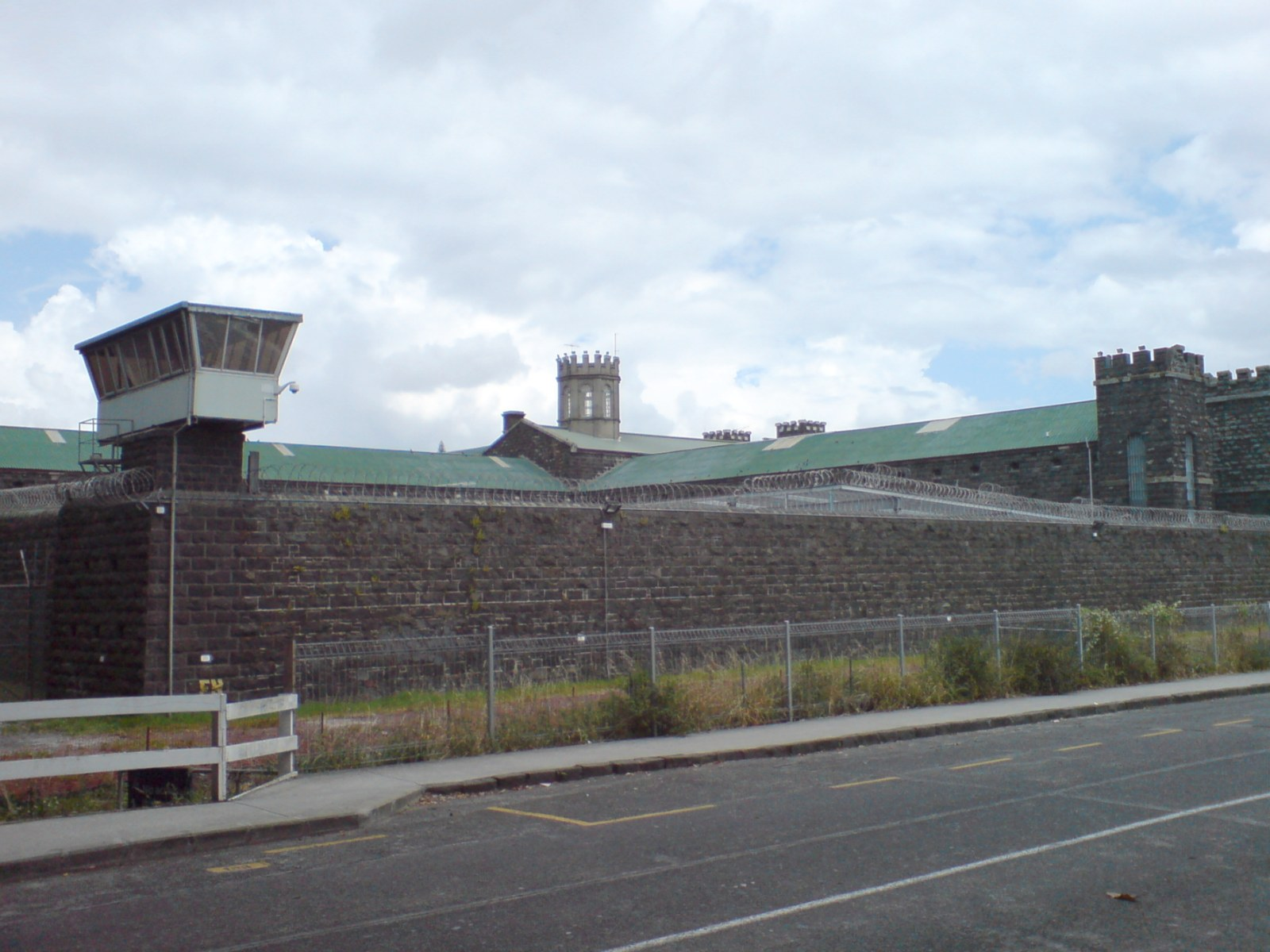
Mount Eden Prison is a 19th-century brick stockade in Mt Eden, a neighbourhood just south of the Auckland CBD, New Zealand.

== Europe ==
=== Estonia ===
Estonia currently maintains five prisons around the country: Harku Prison, Murru Prison, Tallinn Prison, Tartu Prison and Viru Prison. In March 2011, there were 3,405 persons incarcerated in Estonia, and the number of prisoners per 100,000 residents were 254, which is the third highest rate in the EU. These figures include pre-trial detainees and remand prisoners. It is, however, a much lower rate than in the late 1990s and early 2000s, when the Estonian prison population reached almost 5,000 persons.

=== Finland ===
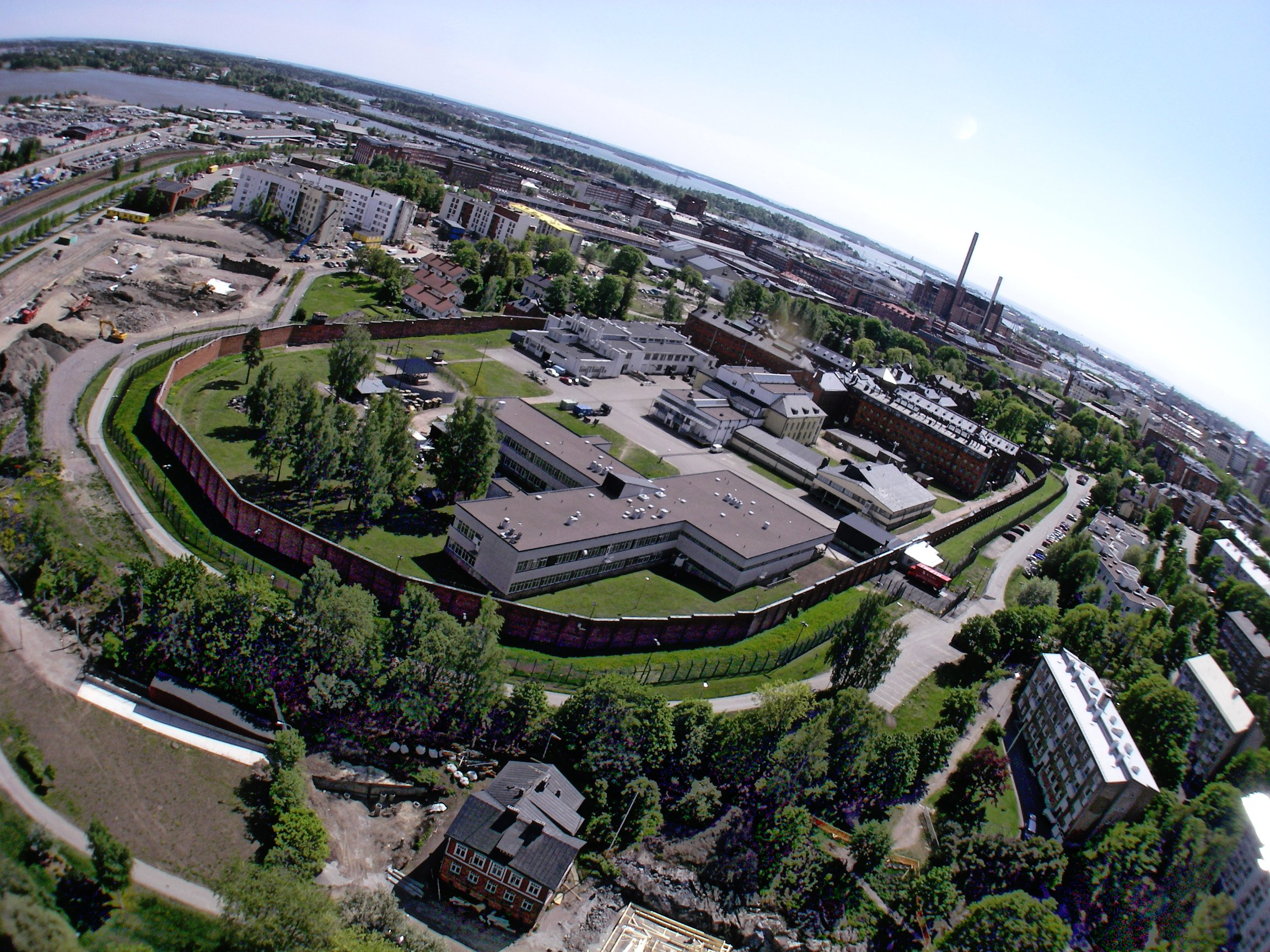
Aerial view of the Helsinki Prison

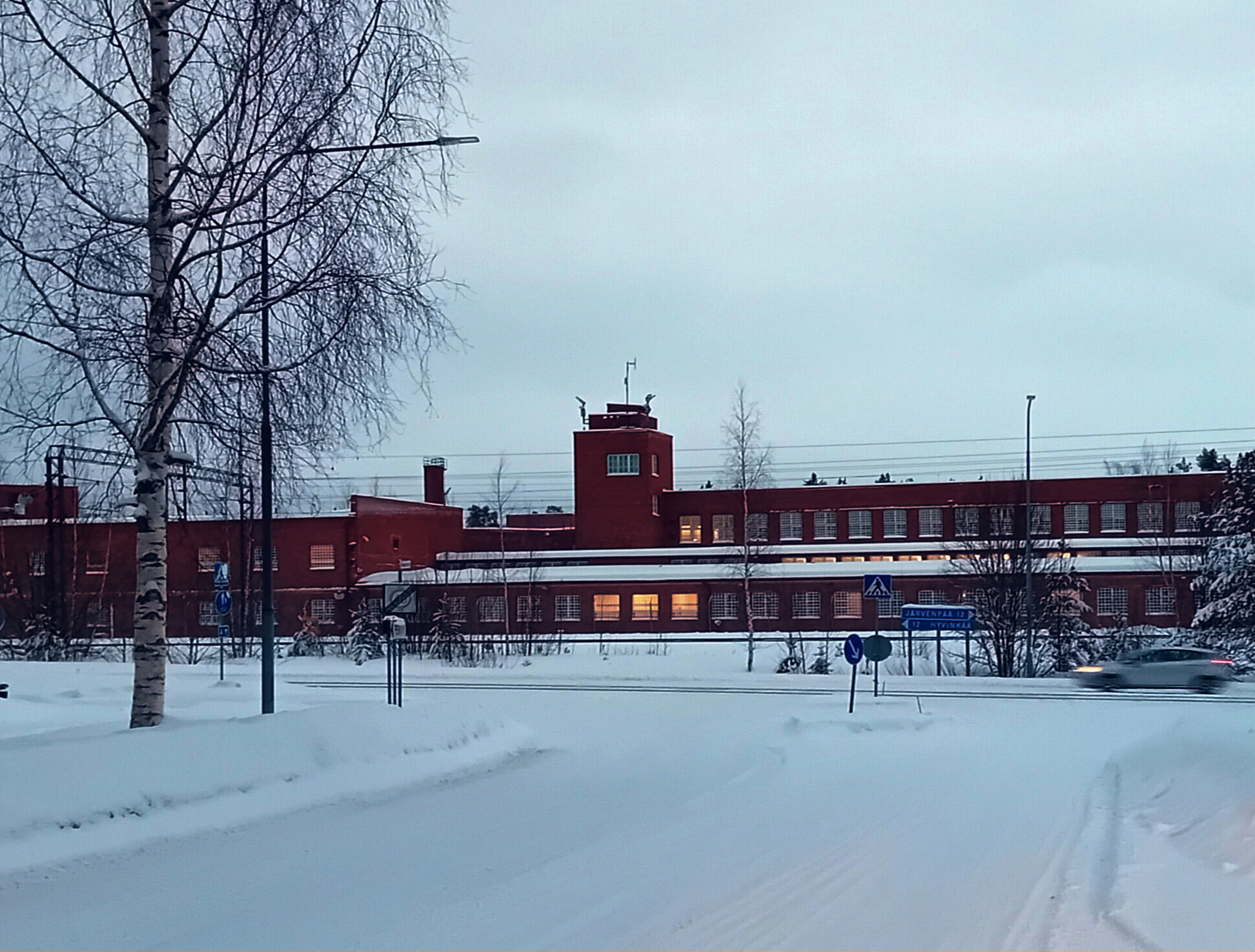
The Jokela Prison in Tuusula

Finland has 26 prisons, of which there may be open prisons and closed prisons.

The Suomenlinna Island facility in Finland is an example of an "open" correctional facility that are also established in Scandinavian nations. The prison has been open since 1971 and, as of September 2013, the facility's 95 male prisoners leave the prison grounds on a daily basis to work in the corresponding township or commute to the mainland for either work or study. Prisoners can rent flat-screen televisions, sound systems, and mini-refrigerators with the prison-labor wages that they can earn—wages range between 4.10 and 7.3 Euros per hour (US$5.30 to $9.50). With electronic monitoring, prisoners are also allowed to visit their families in Helsinki and eat together with the prison staff. Prisoners are permitted to wear their own clothes.

Finnish prison reform had led to the decrease and extremely low incarceration rates that the country now experiences. This model focuses more on the humane treatment of prisoners and due process in regard to courtroom proceeding. They have expanded their alternative programs to keep more citizens out of a formalized jail setting in hopes to avoid offenders re-offending and keep recidivism rates low. In countries like the United States they have used incarceration as a means of politics, and their incarceration rates show it. The basis of the new Finnish model is "humane neoclassical crime policy” (Lappi-Seppala, 2002). By shifting their focus onto situational crime prevention tactics and enforcing local crime rehabilitation measures Finland has been able to successfully go from one of the highest incarceration rates in the world to one of the lowest. In recent years Finland has made moves to increase the length of its prison sentences, which are some of the shortest in the world. The longest sentences are awarded to acts of drug trafficking of about 8–9 years and manslaughter 8–12 years (up to 15 years if multiple crimes). However, murder does receive a life sentence with the option of probation after as little as 12 years (10 years if the prisoner was under 21 when committing the crime) with the possibility of presidential amnesty(Putkonen). Life sentence takes usually 14–15 years, sometimes more, but no maximum duration has been set for it.

=== France ===
The French Ministry of Justice's French Prison Service division has 194 prisons in mainland and the overseas territories. As of 1 January 2009, statistics showed approximately 52,000 available places, with around 58,000 "hosted" prisoners. France is home to Fleury-Mérogis Prison, Europe's largest correctional facility.

=== Germany ===
Germany has 194 prisons (of which 19 are open institutions). Official statistics showed 80,214 places on March 31, 2007. On the same day, there were 75,719 prisoners (of which 13,168 pre-trial; 60,619 serving sentences; 1,932 others, i.e. mainly civil prisoners; 4,068 were female). This is less than the highest value of 81,176 prisoners on March 31, 2003.

=== Iceland ===
There are currently 6 prisons operating in Iceland.

=== Ireland ===
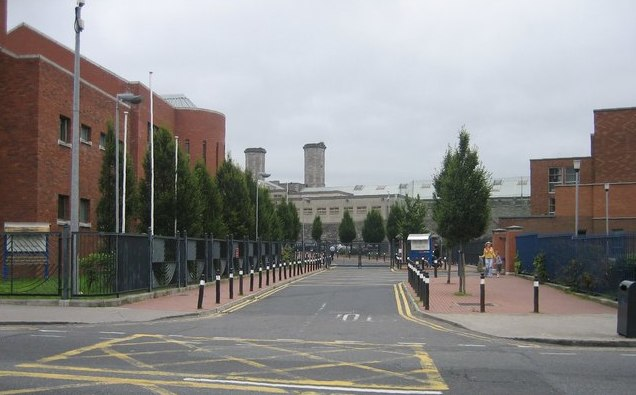
Mountjoy Campus, North Circular Road, Dublin 7, Ireland, containing 4 prisons including: Mountjoy Prison; the Dóchas Centre; St. Patrick's Institution; and, The Training Unit.

There are currently 14 prisons operating in the Republic of Ireland with a total bed capacity of 4,106 as of the 31 December 2009. The daily average number of prisoners in custody in 2009 was 3,881. However, most of these prisons currently operate at or above capacity.

=== The Netherlands ===
According to a mid-June 2013 report by Dutch television station NOS, 19 Dutch prisons will be closed due to a declining crime rate and budgetary cuts. As a result of the closures, a higher number of prisoners will be required to share cells and electronic tagging will become a favoured option during sentencing procedures for people convicted of a crime/s.

=== Norway ===
Prisoners in Norway are assigned to prison cells of various categories: Cells used by prisoners in police custody most often belong to category glattcelle ("smooth cell"). The police force of Oslo was fined Norwegian kroner 50 000 in 2011 for holding a prisoner for 8 days in a glattcelle (And for a similar incident later in 2011, the police district was not fined because it had already been fined for the first incident).

Ombudsman for Children in Norway claims that a United Nations' committee has criticized practices in regard to the imprisonment of children in Norway.

=== Poland ===
As of the end of August 2007, Poland officially declared 90,199 prisoners (13,374 pre-trial; 76,434 serving sentences; 391 others; 2,743 prisoners were female), giving an imprisonment rate per 100,000 inhabitants of about 234. The overpopulation rate (number of prisoners held compared to number of places for prisoners) was estimated by the official prison service as 119%.

The growth rate of imprisonment in Poland during 2006–2007 was approximately 4% annually, based on the August 2007 estimate of 90,199 prisoners and the June 2005 estimate of 82,572 prisoners.

=== Russia ===
The Pussy Riot activist Nadezhda Tolokonnikova wrote a public letter of Russian prisons in 2013 receiving international attention on the Russian prison conditions. According to Ilya Shablinsky, a member of the presidential human-rights council who audited her prison, conditions where close to those of a “slave labour”. Auditor found women prisons working 14 hours a day and one day off a month. In 2013 Russia had the world tenth-highest share of prisons of population. In 2010 Dimitri Medvedev brought down the prison population by 17.5%. Prisons were divided still in 2013 as the “red” run by prison authorities and the “black” administered by inmates. According to the Economist (2013) change would demand a deeper reform of the police and the courts. Despite the actuality and awareness of the problem the women prisons slave work in Russia was not reason for IOC or the participants to cancel the 2014 Winter Olympics in Russia.

=== Turkey ===
Prisons in Turkey are classified as closed, semi-open and open prisons. Closed prisons are separated into different kinds according to its structure and the number of prisoners held. Examples are A type, B type, E type and F type. F types are high security prisons, known in the United States as Supermax.

=== United Kingdom ===
In the Prison Act 1952, the word "prison" does not include a naval, military or air force prison.

In section 38B of the Criminal Law Act 1977, the word "prison" means, in the case of a person who is under the age of 21 years arrested in England and Wales, any place in which he could be detained under section 12(10) of the Criminal Justice Act 1982, and, in the case of a person under that age arrested in Northern Ireland, a young offenders centre.

In section 1 of the Prison Security Act 1992, the word "prison" means any prison, young offender institution or remand centre which is under the general superintendence of, or is provided by, the Secretary of State under the Prison Act 1952, including a contracted out prison within the meaning of Part IV of the Criminal Justice Act 1991

In section 4 of the Regulation of Investigatory Powers Act 2000, the word "prison" means any prison, young offender institution, young offenders centre or remand centre which is under the general superintendence of, or is provided by, the Secretary of State under the Prison Act 1952 or the Prison Act (Northern Ireland) 1953 (c. 18 (N.I.)), or, any prison, young offenders institution or remand centre which is under the general superintendence of the Scottish Ministers under the Prisons (Scotland) Act 1989, and includes any contracted out prison, within the meaning of Part IV of the Criminal Justice Act 1991 or section 106(4) of the Criminal Justice and Public Order Act 1994, and any legalised police cells within the meaning of section 14 of the Prisons (Scotland) Act 1989.

== North America ==
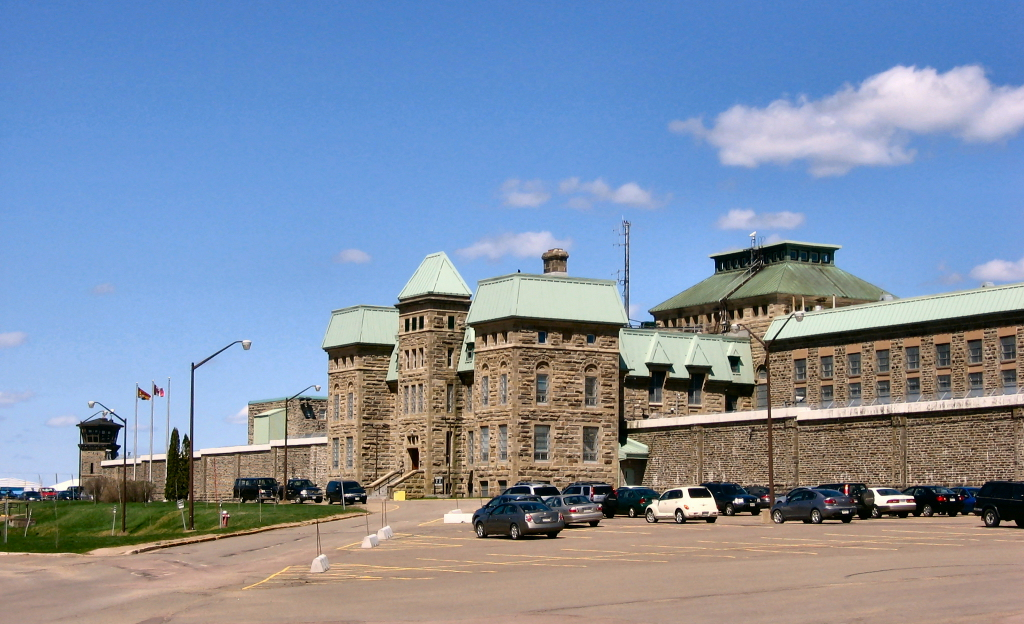
Dorchester Penitentiary in New Brunswick, Canada, part of Corrections Canada. Opened in 1880 as a maximum security prison, it now functions as a medium security facility.

=== Canada ===
The 52 penitentiaries (often known as prisons) in Canada are operated by the federal government, and are for those who have been sentenced to serve more than 2 years of custody. The boundary of two years separating provincial and federal custody underlies the sentencing of some offenders to "two years less a day", so they can serve their sentences in provincial correctional institutions.

=== United States ===
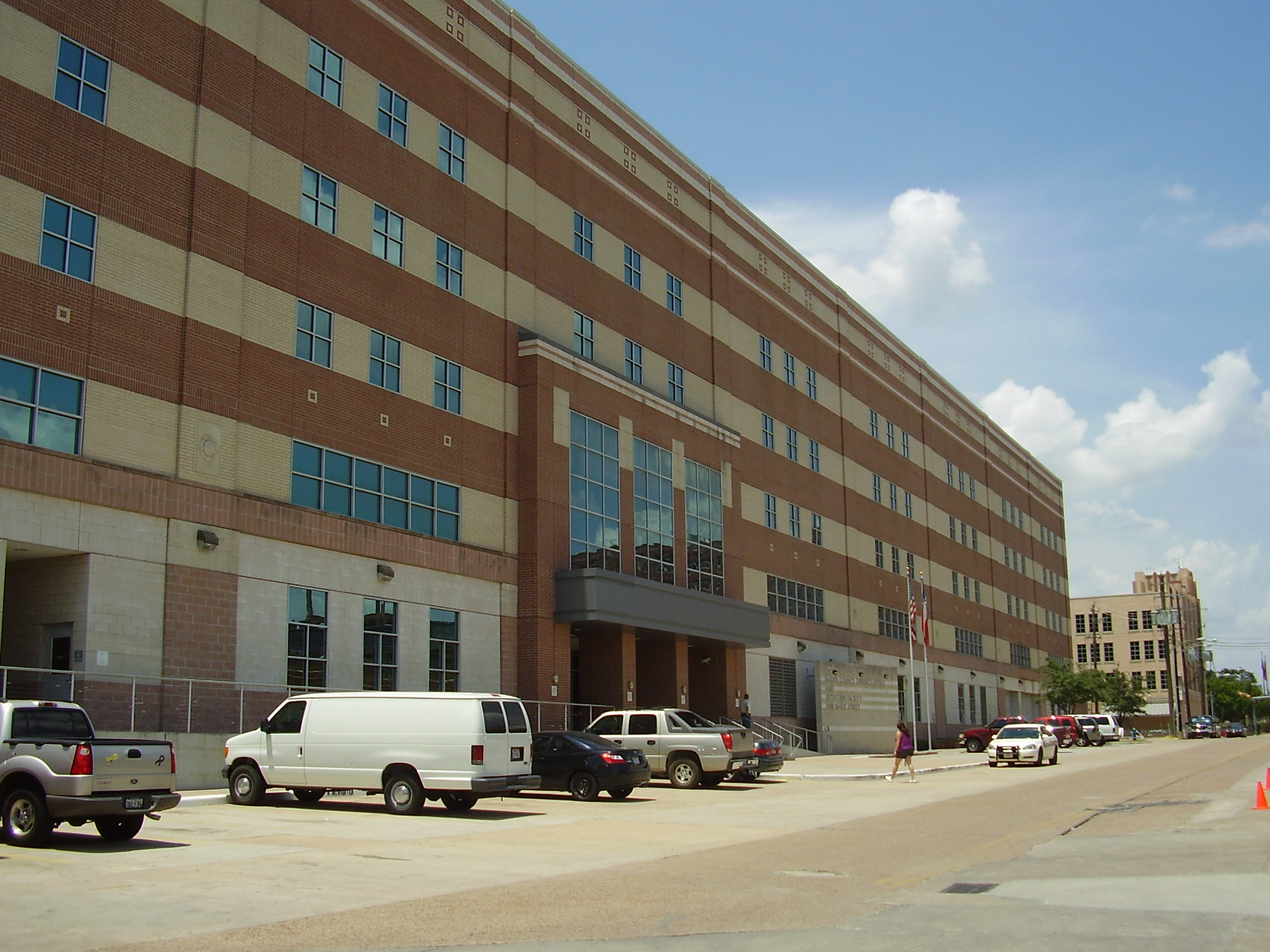
The 1200 Jail in Downtown Houston, Texas, serves as a jail and the headquarters of the Harris County Sheriff's Office.

In the United States penal system, a jail is a facility used to detain persons who are in the lawful custody of the state, including accused persons awaiting trial and those who have been convicted of a crime and are serving a sentence of less than one year. Jails are generally small prisons run by individual counties and cities, though some jails in larger communities may be as large and hold as many inmates as regular prisons. As with prisons, some jails have different wings for certain types of offenders, and have work programs for inmates who demonstrate good behavior.

Approximately half of the U.S. jail population consists of pretrial detainees who have not been convicted or sentenced. Prisoners serving terms longer than one year are typically housed in prison facilities operated by state governments. Unlike most state prisons, a jail usually houses both men and women in separate portions of the same facility. Some jails lease space to house inmates from the federal government, state prisons or other counties as a revenue-raising method.

In 2005, a report by the Bureau of Justice Statistics found that 62 percent of people in jails have not been convicted, and are awaiting trial. As of 2005, local jails held or supervised 819,434 individuals. Nine percent of these individuals were in programs such as community service, work release, weekend reporting, electronic monitoring, and other alternative programs. As of 2013, ethnic and racial minorities are represented by 60% of the US prison population.

A study released in 1982 stated that the life expectancy of a US correctional officer is 59 years, compared to 75 years for the national average. Published in the Corrections Today journal, the study also found that stress was found to be higher than that of a comparable sample of police officers, while alcoholism and divorce rates were higher for correctional officers than for the general US population.

== South America ==
=== Brazil ===
In 2010, 473,600 people were incarcerated in Brazilian prisons and jails.
