= Ruokangas Guitars =

Finnish guitar manufacturer

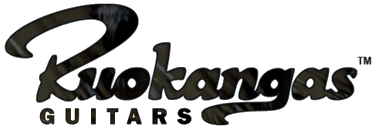
- Type: Private
- Industry: Musical instruments
- Founded: 1995; 31 years ago
- Founder: Juha Ruokangas
- Headquarters: Janakkala, Finland
- Area served: Worldwide
- Products: Electric guitars
- Website: ruokangas.com

Ruokangas Guitars builds solid-body and semi-hollow electric guitars, including models such as Duke, VSOP, Mojo, Hellcat and Unicorn. The company builds guitars using traditional methods – no modern computer-controlled machinery or serial production methods are used. Each guitar is built individually by a luthier.

Ruokangas Guitars is a privately held corporation, solely owned by Master Luthier Juha Ruokangas.

== History ==
1995 – Juha Ruokangas founds the company as a sole trader and rents a small workshop facility in Finland, Hyvinkää at Wanha Villatehdas, to build and repair guitars.

1996 – Juha starts using moose shin bone as nut material in all his guitars and repair work.

Duke series

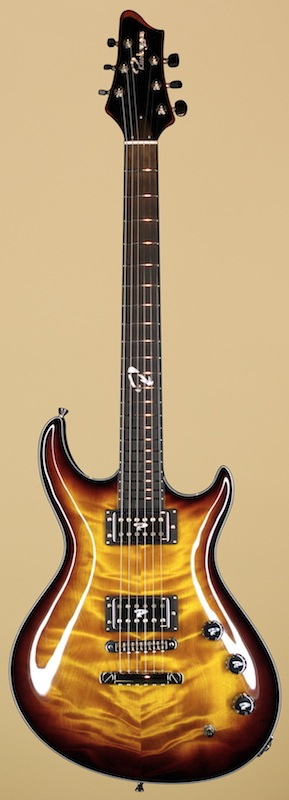
Classic

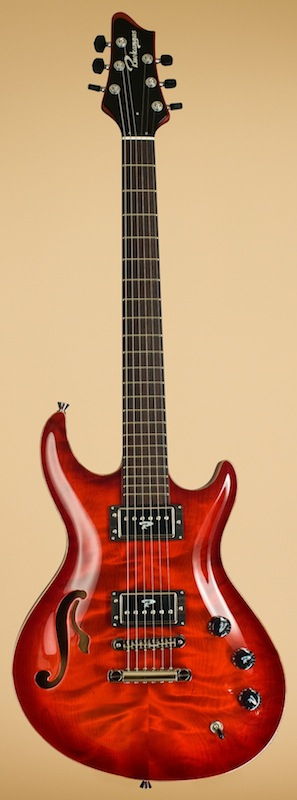
Artisan

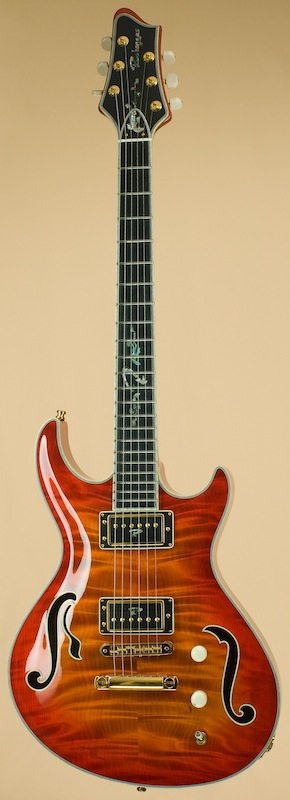
Royale

1997 – The website ruokangas.com is published, and the first Ruokangas guitar model – the Duke – is launched. Juha experiments with Spanish Cedar (Cedrela odorata) as the body and neckwood – a tonewood not commonly used in electric guitars. Spanish Cedar is to become one of the fundamental characteristics of Ruokangas Guitars.

1998 – Juha participates in a thermo treatment project (a Finnish invention), funded by the European Union. Thermo treated tonewood becomes a common feature in Ruokangas guitars. The method slowly became popular in other parts of the world, too. In the North America thermo treated wood is often referred to by trade names such as roasted, torrefied or caramelised wood.

1999 – Juha starts co-operation with fellow craftsmen Mika Koskinen and Jiri Kaarmela, who are to become part owners of the company two years later, along with luthier Jarkko Lindholm, who joins the team in 2000, but leaves a year later to work on his own Lindholm Musical Instruments. Juha designs and launches new variations of the Duke theme and introduces another uncommon local material – the Arctic Birch tops.

2000 – Juha designs and launches the second Ruokangas model – VSOP, built of thermo treated Alder and Rock Maple – and attends the Frankfurt Musikmesse for the first time.

2001 – Luthier Jyrki Kostamo joins the Ruokangas team. The company format changes from sole trader to privately held corporation. The first dealerships are confirmed and Ruokangas is reviewed in guitar magazines more regularly. Ruokangas proprietary pickups (manufactured by Harry Häussel in Germany) are launched.

2003 – Ruokangas Guitars publishes a new website design with online guitar configurator tool (based on an idea by Jarkko Lindholm) developed by graphics designer Junnu Vuorela, where one can visually choose colors, pickups, woods and parts online. Such configurators were rare at the time, with the Japanese Kisekae Guitar Creator being the first internationally known commercial version (launched in 2000), but later on such tools have gained more popularity, as the technology has become more readily available and network speed has increased.

Mojo series

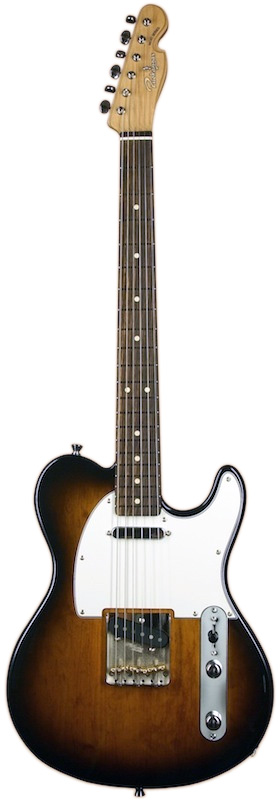
Classic

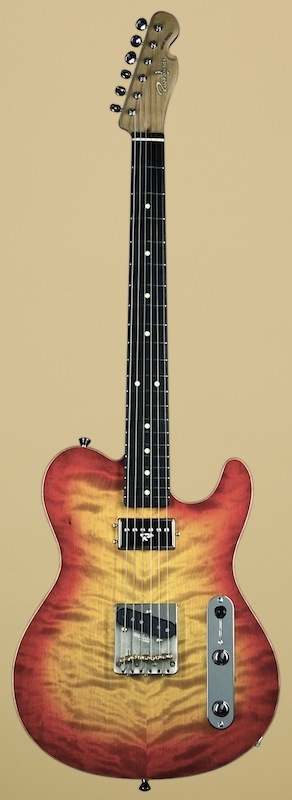
Deluxe

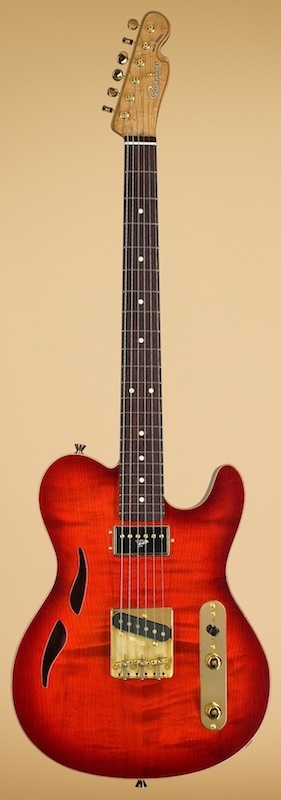
Grande

2004 – Luthier Tomi Nivala joins the Ruokangas team. Junnu Vuorela wins the MindTrek Award for productive innovations with the Ruokangas website design. Ruokangas launches a new guitar model – the Mojo. Ruokangas licences the Buzz Feiten Tuning System.

2005 – Ruokangas Guitars attends The NAMM Show for the first time. Master's degree becomes available for luthiers in Finland. The "domestic" Ruokangas website ruokangas.fi is published. Ruokangas Guitars celebrates its 10th Anniversary.

2006 – Luthier Emma Elftorp, from Sweden, joins the Ruokangas team.

2007 – Ruokangas Guitars attends the Fuzz Guitar Show in Gothenburg, Sweden. Co-operation with True Temperament company starts.

2008 – The Hellcat, a new guitar model, is introduced. Ruokangas joins Facebook. Juha and Emma launch "The Project Unicorn" – new guitar design process open to public via YouTube.

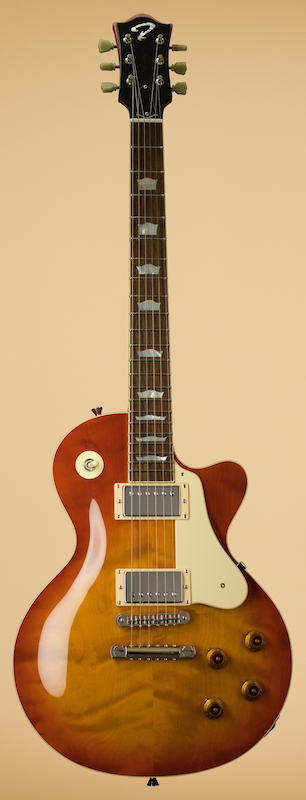
Unicorn Classic model, introduced in 2009

2009 – The Unicorn guitar model is introduced. Also the first Ruokangas bass model - the Steambass - is introduced. Juha receives his Master Luthier degree. Ruokangas is invited to exhibit at Montreal Guitar Show (discontinued in 2013), the annual high end event for the finest guitars in the world. Juha becomes one of the founding members (and the first chairman of the board) of The Guild Of Finnish Luthiers (Suomen Soitinrakentajien Kilta).

2010 – The 4th employee, luthier Lari Lätti joins the Ruokangas team. The new Ruokangas website (developed by Juha Javanainen and Junnu Vuorela) and iPhone application (developed by MK&C in cooperation with Junnu Vuorela) is launched in January. The website gets an Honorary Award in the Grand One 2010 competition – the Best Information Design category. Ruokangas exhibits again at the Montreal Guitar Show (MGS), and the show organization Salon de Guitare de Montréal orders a Ruokangas guitar to their Ste-Cat Collection. This is the first European guitar in the collection.

2011 – The Ruokangas workshop moves from Hyvinkää to the historic Manor of Harviala in Janakkala. Exhibits and co-organizes the first ever Turenki Tonefest. Juha Ruokangas is chosen by Robert Shaw as one of the most influential contemporary electric guitar makers in the world in his book ‘Electrified’. Jay Jay French of Twisted Sister orders a Duke for his famous Pinkburst Collection to benefit the research of uveitis. Other brands involved in the Pinkburst Project were: Gibson, Fender, Epiphone, Gretsch, PRS, Martin, Marshall, Mesa Boogie, Vox, Orange, HartkeDandiamond

2012 – Finnish design critic Kaj Kalin chooses Ruokangas Guitars as the winner of the first ever Taito-Finlandia Award. Juha and Emma become some of the founding members and Juha becomes the first Vice President of The European Guitar Builders (EGB) association.

2013 – Introduces the Unicorn Artisan and Mojo King models. Is invited to exhibit at The Healdsburg Guitar Festival (Santa Rosa, CA; USA).

2014 – Juha and Emma works actively in EGB to lift the public image of European guitar making to new heights by launching The Holy Grail Guitar Show. Launches "Ruokangas Rendezvous", an event held in Cologne, targeted for Ruokangas enthusiasts and guitar fans in general. Ruokangas Guitars exhibits at the first ever Holy Grail Guitar Show, held in Berlin. Introduces the Captain Nemo guitar, along with a pickup innovation called the Valvebucker®. The Holy Grail Guitar Show is widely regarded in guitar media as "the new golden standard of guitar shows".

2015 – Luthier Jani Rinta-Keturi joins the Ruokangas team. The company celebrates its 20th anniversary. Launches the Aeon and Unicorn Supersonic guitar models. Development continues on the new Valvebucker® tube guitar pickup. The Ruokangas team participates as actors in The Spirit of the Guitar Hunt -movie directed by Mika Tyyskä, also known as Mr. Fastfinger. Ruokangas Guitars exhibits at the second Holy Grail Guitar Show in Berlin.

== Instruments ==
=== Duke ===
VSOP series

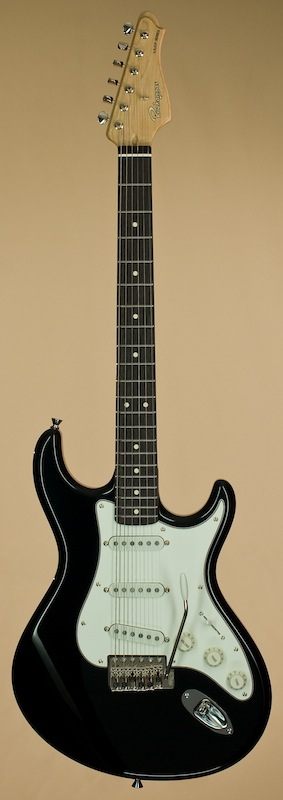
Classic

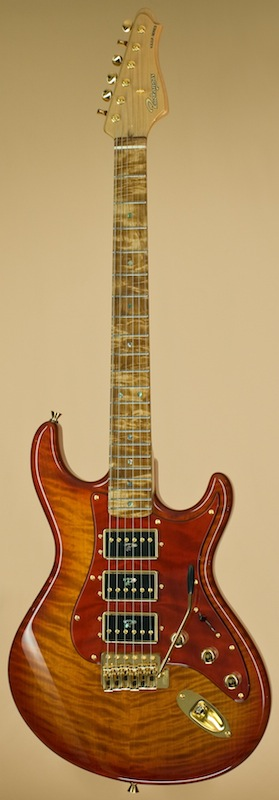
DeLuxe

Hellcat series

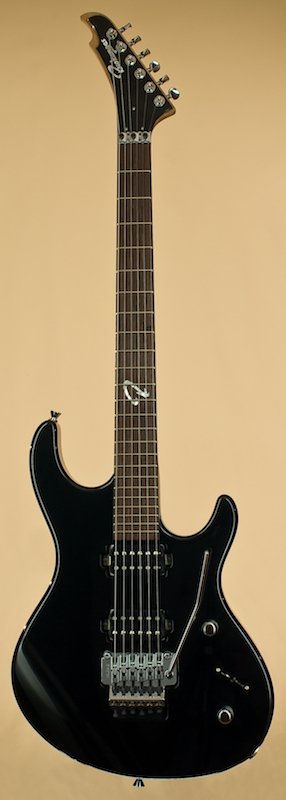
Classic

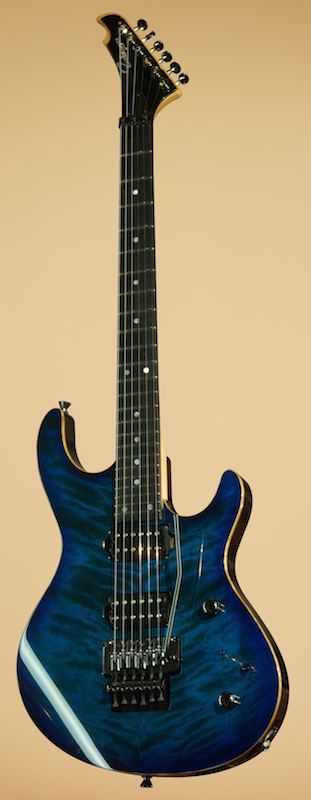
Deluxe

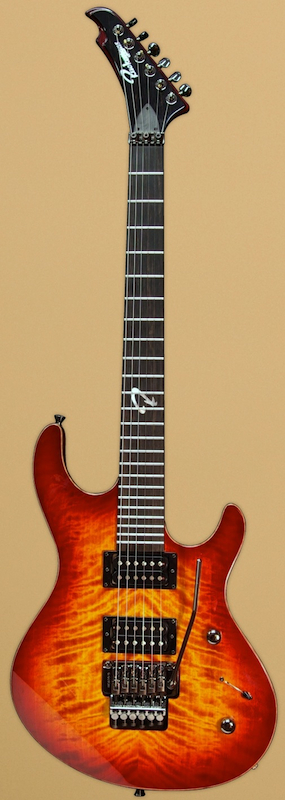
Artist

First introduced in 1997 – a carved top double-cutaway electric guitar with set-neck construction. Both solid body and semi-acoustic versions exist. Includes a number of unique design points. Current model versions are: Sonic (replaced the earlier Sonic and TwinSonic), Classic (replaced the earlier Classic, Standard and DeLuxe), Artisan (replaced the earlier Special) and Royale.

=== VSOP ===
First introduced in 2000 – a solid body bolt-on double-cutaway electric guitar with tremolo bridge. The current model versions are: Classic (replaced the Standard, Plus, Special and King) and DeLuxe (replaced the Supreme).

=== Mojo ===
First introduced in 2004 – a bolt-on single-cutaway electric guitar. Both solid body and semi-acoustic versions exist. Current model versions are: Classic (replaced the earlier Classic and Blues), DeLuxe and Grande (replaced the earlier Supreme and Grande).

=== Hellcat ===
First introduced in 2008 – a modern solid body double-cutaway electric guitar with Floyd Rose type tremolo, both bolt-on and neck-thru-body designs exist. The model versions introduced: Classic, DeLuxe and Artist.

=== Unicorn ===
First introduced in 2009 – a modern take on a traditional solid body single-cutaway electric with set neck and carved top. The model version introduced: Classic. The Unicorn guitar design process and the making of the first two prototypes was documented as a YouTube video diary by Juha Ruokangas and Emma Elftorp.

== Players ==
Jay Jay French (Twisted Sister), Mick Box (Uriah Heep), Josh Smith, Tommy Emmanuel, Matias Kupiainen (Stratovarius), Emppu Vuorinen (Nightwish), Jukka Tolonen, Juha Torvinen (Eppu Normaali), Mikko "Pantse" Syrjä (Eppu Normaali), Sami Ruusukallio (Eppu Normaali), Juha Björninen, Peter Lerche, Ben Wigler (Arizona), Rainer Nygård (Diablo), Sami Saarinen (Status Minor), Marko Karhu, Peter Engberg, Florian Zepf (Candycream), Joel Auge (Hewit), Sascha Wiegand (Bitune), Christian Wosimski (Bitune), Aaron Kaplan, Henri Arola (Dyecrest), Pirkka Ohlis (Dyecrest), Matti Pasanen (Dyecrest), Kai Seppälä (Jetsetters), Edmund Piskaty, Jani Wickholm, Saku Mattila, Rick Simcox (The ToneQuesters), Mr. Manetti, Sonny Landreth

== Bibliography ==
- Electrified by Robert Shaw. ISBN 1-4027-4774-8
- Guitars – A celebration of Pure Mojo by David Schiller. ISBN 978-0-7611-3800-6
- MindTrek 1997–2006 Bittivirtaa, Kuohuntaa ja Arkipäivää by Tommi Pelkonen & Ulla Vehmasaho. ISBN 952-92-1155-4
- Suomi Kitarat by Juha Vartiainen. ISBN 978-952-220-012-9
- Suomalainen Kitara 2000-luvulla by Jarno Vesa. ISBN 978-951-98245-9-8
