= Jokela railway station =

Railway station in Tuusula, Finland

Jokela
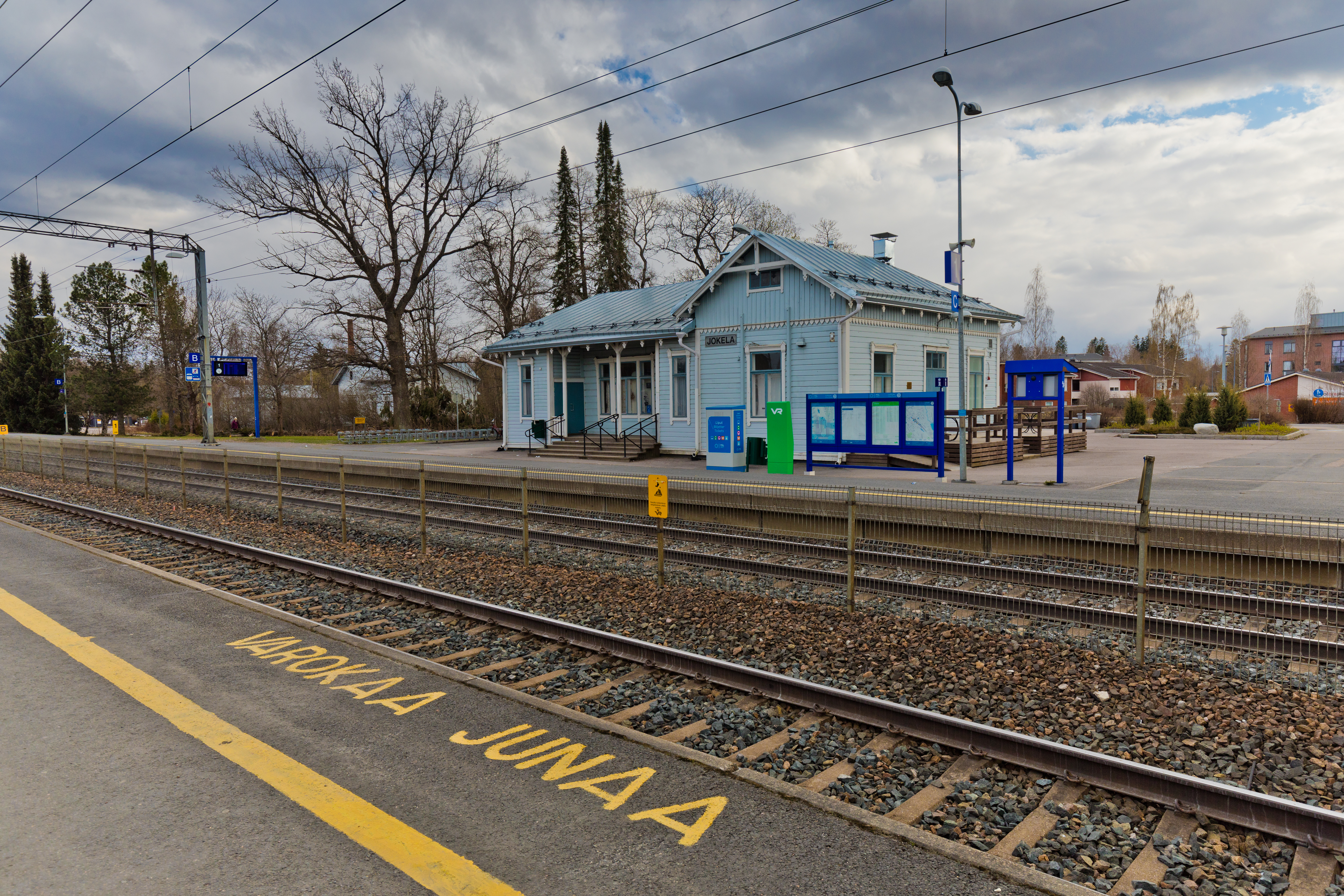

General information
- Location: Asemanraitti; Jokela, Tuusula; Finland
- Coordinates: 60°33′11″N 024°58′14″E
- Owner: Finnish Transport Infrastructure Agency
- Line: Helsinki–Riihimäki railway
- Platforms: 3

Construction
- Structure type: ground station

Other information
- Station code: Jk
- Fare zone: E

Passengers
- 2015: 1,876 daily

Services
Preceding station	VR commuter rail	Following station
Saunakallio towards Helsinki	R	Hyvinkää towards Riihimäki or Tampere
Saunakallio towards Helsinki	T	Hyvinkää towards Riihimäki
Location
- Location within Uusimaa Location within Finland

Jokela railway station (Finnish: Jokelan rautatieasema, Swedish: Jokela järnvägsstation) is located along the Finnish Main Line in Tuusula, Finland, 48 km to the north of Helsinki Central railway station. It is situated between the stations of Nuppulinna and Hyvinkää.

The station serves VR commuter rail lines R and T that run between Helsinki and Riihimäki.

== History ==
Jokela railway station was not one of the original stations of the Finnish Main Line opened in 1862. Jokela was first opened as a stop and later promoted to a station in 1874. A brick factory was founded near the station around the same time.

The wooden station building designed by architect Knut Nylander was completed in 1875 and was expanded with the plans of architect Bruno Granholm in 1903.

A community was formed by the station and the brick factory and the first store, an inn and a post office was established there in the 1880's. The population of the community had risen up to 300 by 1890.

The station was the scene of the Jokela rail accident (pictured below) on 21 April 1996, in which four people were killed and 75 injured after a train derailed in heavy fog.

The ticket sales office was closed in 2011.

== Departure tracks ==
Jokela railway station has three platform tracks. Track 3 is normally unused by the trains that stop at the station.

- Track 1 is used by commuter trains R and T trains to Helsinki.
- Track 2 is used by commuter trains R and T trains to Riihimäki.
