= Hyvinkää =

City in Uusimaa, Finland

Hyvinkää Hyvinge
- City
- Hyvinkään kaupunki Hyvinge stad
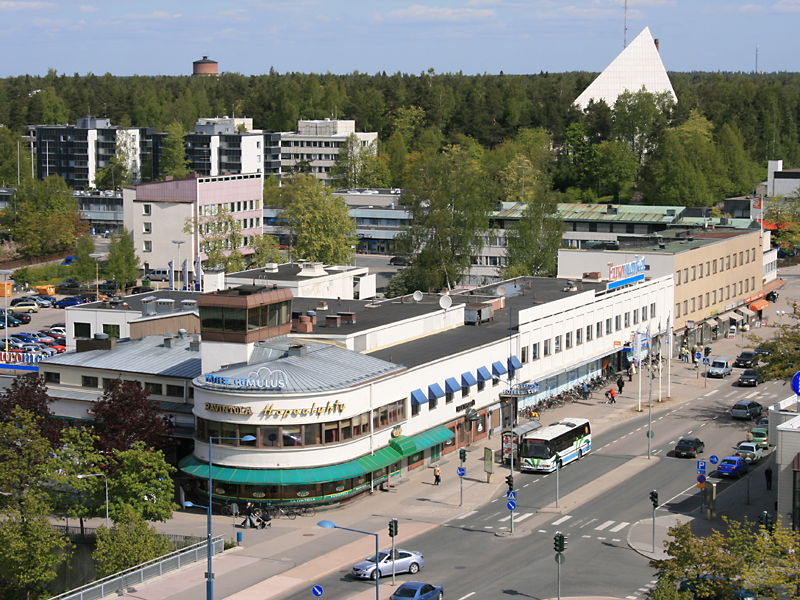
- Ahjo building from 1935 in central Hyvinkää. The church of Hyvinkää in the background.

- Flag Coat of arms

- Location of Hyvinkää in Finland
- Interactive map of Hyvinkää
- Coordinates: 60°38′N 024°51′E
- Country: Finland
- Region: Uusimaa
- Sub-region: Helsinki sub-region
- Metropolitan area: Helsinki metropolitan area
- Charter: 1917
- City rights: 1960

Government
  - City manager: Johanna Luukkonen

Area (2018-01-01)
  - Total: 336.77 km^{2} (130.03 sq mi)
  - Land: 322.69 km^{2} (124.59 sq mi)
  - Water: 14.14 km^{2} (5.46 sq mi)
  - Rank: 229th largest in Finland

Population (2025-12-31)
  - Total: 47,015
  - Rank: 23rd largest in Finland
  - Density: 145.7/km^{2} (377/sq mi)

Population by native language
  - Finnish: 90.1% (official)
  - Swedish: 0.9%
  - Others: 9%

Population by age
  - 0 to 14: 15.1%
  - 15 to 64: 62.2%
  - 65 or older: 22.7%
- Time zone: UTC+02:00 (EET)
  - Summer (DST): UTC+03:00 (EEST)
- Climate: Dfc
- Website: www.hyvinkaa.fi/in-english/

Hyvinkää (Finnish: [ˈhyʋiŋkæː]; Swedish: Hyvinge, Finland Swedish: [ˈhyviŋe]) is a city in Finland, located in the southern interior of the country. Hyvinkää is situated in the northern part of the Uusimaa region. The population of Hyvinkää is approximately 47,000. It is the 23rd most populous municipality in Finland. Hyvinkää is part of the Helsinki Metropolitan Area, which has approximately 1.62 million inhabitants.

Hyvinkää is located approximately 50 kilometres (30 mi) north of the capital Helsinki. The city was granted its charter in 1960. The municipality shares borders with Riihimäki and Hausjärvi to the north, Mäntsälä to the east, Tuusula and Nurmijärvi to the south, and Vihti and Loppi to the west.

Highways, such as the Tampere Highway (E12) and Hanko Highway, as well as rail connections, make it one of the suburban commuter centres of the Helsinki Metropolitan Area. The city planning has placed emphasis on recreational facilities.

Hyvinkää is home to several well-known buildings, including the 1961 church and the Kytäjä manor house. Additionally, the Finnish Railway Museum is located in Hyvinkää. Kytäjä Golf is located in the village of Kytäjä in the Hyvinkää countryside.

Hyvinkää is also home to Konecranes, which specialises in the manufacture and service of cranes, and KONE Elevators, the world's third largest elevator company, which manufactures, installs and services elevators and escalators.

== History ==
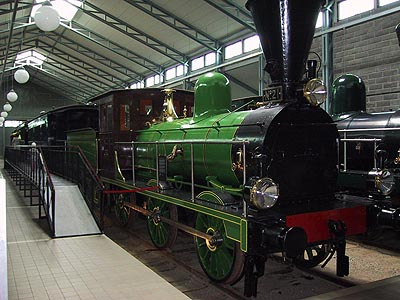
A painstakingly restored British "Neilson and Company" engine, used in Finland from 1869 well into the 1920s, preserved at the Finnish Railway Museum

In the 16th century there was a tavern in the area now known as Hyvinkäänkylä (literally "the village of Hyvinkää"), which lies approximately halfway between Helsinki and Hämeenlinna. It was mentioned the first time in 1495 as Höffinga. The first tax catalogues also marked the existence of some houses in the area around the same time. During the 16th century there was also a mine close to current-day Kytäjä village.

Hyvinkää village gradually grew in the latter half of the 19th century, though it was the construction of the railway network through Finland, beginning in 1861, that marked the starting point for the town's rapid growth. Hyvinkää, who still belonged to the Nurmijärvi parish at that time, resigned in 1917 as its own parishioner.

The construction of Finland's first stretch of railroad, the Helsinki–Hämeenlinna line, determined the location of the present city centre and the railway station of Hyvinkää is one of the few original stations still in use. From Hyvinkää the railway also branches off to the port of Hanko. The Hanko–Hyvinkää Railroad was the first private railroad in Finland, founded in 1862, and acquired by the Finnish State RR Co. in 1875. In the early 20th century, the station village in Hyvinkää was an intermediate stopping point for many emigrants leaving by ship from Hanko for a new life in North America.

The air quality of Hyvinkää was considered healthy due to dense pine forests, and in the 1880s a group of physicians from Helsinki opened a sanatorium for patients seeking rest and recuperation.

Industrialization brought a wool factory to Hyvinkää in 1892 – the Donner family's Hyvinge Yllespinneri. The factory ceased operation in the 1990s, but the red-brick halls still remain. The building has found several new uses, including an exhibition centre and a theater.

Hyvinkää Airfield served as the country's main airport for a short time after the second World War while Helsinki-Malmi Airport was under the control of the Allied Powers. There is now a motorsports centre near the airfield.

Hyvinkää's population grew quickly following the Second World War. It became home to many Finnish Karelian refugees after Karelia was handed out to Soviet Union by the Moscow Peace Treaty. Nowadays Hyvinkää is the sixth biggest town by inhabitants of Uusimaa.

== Climate ==
Hyvinkää has a humid continental climate (Dfb), typical for southern Finland.

Climate data for Hyvinkää Hyvinkäänkylä (1991-2020 normals, extremes 1959-present)
Month	Jan	Feb	Mar	Apr	May	Jun	Jul	Aug	Sep	Oct	Nov	Dec	Year
Record high °C (°F)	8.2 (46.8)	8.9 (48.0)	16.7 (62.1)	24.2 (75.6)	29.5 (85.1)	31.9 (89.4)	34.1 (93.4)	32.7 (90.9)	27.2 (81.0)	18.7 (65.7)	13.3 (55.9)	10.6 (51.1)	34.1 (93.4)
Mean daily maximum °C (°F)	−2.4 (27.7)	−2.4 (27.7)	2.2 (36.0)	9.0 (48.2)	16.0 (60.8)	20.0 (68.0)	22.8 (73.0)	21.0 (69.8)	15.4 (59.7)	8.0 (46.4)	2.7 (36.9)	−0.4 (31.3)	9.3 (48.7)
Daily mean °C (°F)	−5.1 (22.8)	−5.6 (21.9)	−2.0 (28.4)	3.9 (39.0)	10.2 (50.4)	14.6 (58.3)	17.3 (63.1)	15.5 (59.9)	10.5 (50.9)	4.8 (40.6)	0.6 (33.1)	−2.7 (27.1)	5.2 (41.4)
Mean daily minimum °C (°F)	−8.1 (17.4)	−9.0 (15.8)	−6.0 (21.2)	−0.9 (30.4)	3.9 (39.0)	8.8 (47.8)	11.7 (53.1)	10.4 (50.7)	6.4 (43.5)	1.8 (35.2)	−1.8 (28.8)	−5.3 (22.5)	1.0 (33.8)
Record low °C (°F)	−37.5 (−35.5)	−36.9 (−34.4)	−32 (−26)	−21.4 (−6.5)	−6.6 (20.1)	−2.6 (27.3)	1.2 (34.2)	−2.5 (27.5)	−10.4 (13.3)	−16.4 (2.5)	−24.8 (−12.6)	−33.1 (−27.6)	−37.5 (−35.5)
Average precipitation mm (inches)	53 (2.1)	40 (1.6)	35 (1.4)	34 (1.3)	40 (1.6)	65 (2.6)	70 (2.8)	75 (3.0)	54 (2.1)	67 (2.6)	65 (2.6)	57 (2.2)	656 (25.8)
Average precipitation days (≥ 1.0 mm)	12	9	8	7	7	10	9	10	9	11	12	12	116
Source 1: FMI normals 1991-2020
Source 2: Record highs and lows

== Demographics ==
=== Population ===
The city of Hyvinkää has 47,015 inhabitants, making it the 23rd most populous municipality in Finland. The city of Hyvinkää is part of the Helsinki metropolitan area, which is the largest urban area in Finland with 1,623,283 inhabitants.

Population size 1990–2025
Year	Population
1990	40,194
1995	41,203
2000	42,545
2005	43,848
2010	45,489
2015	46,463
2020	46,576
2025	47,015

=== Languages ===
Population by
mother tongue (2025)
1. Finnish (90.1%)
2. Estonian (1.20%)
3. Russian (1.20%)
4. Swedish (0.90%)
5. Ukrainian (0.80%)
6. Albanian (0.60%)
7. Arabic (0.60%)
8. Other (4.60%)

Hyvinkää is a monolingual Finnish-speaking municipality. The majority of the population, 42,342 persons (90.1%), spoke Finnish as their first language. In addition, the number of Swedish speakers was 426 persons (0.9%) of the population. Foreign languages were spoken by 9% of the population. As English and Swedish are compulsory school subjects, functional bilingualism or trilingualism acquired through language studies is not uncommon.

At least 30 different languages are spoken in Hyvinkää. The most common foreign languages are Estonian (1.2%), Russian (1.2%), Ukrainian (0.8%) and Albanian (0.6%).

=== Immigration ===
Population by country of birth (2025)
Country of birth	Population	%
Finland	43,099	91.6
Soviet Union	576	1.2
Estonia	473	1.0
Ukraine	225	0.5
Sweden	194	0.4
Philippines	178	0.4
Syria	165	0.4
India	150	0.3
Thailand	148	0.3
Yugoslavia	133	0.3
Other	1,874	4.0

As of 2024, there were 4,089 persons with a foreign background living in Hyvinkää, or 8% of the population. (Note: Statistics Finland classifies a person as having a "foreign background" if both parents or the only known parent were born abroad.) The number of residents who were born abroad was 3,773, or 8% of the population. The number of persons with foreign citizenship living in Hyvinkää was 2,677. Most foreign-born citizens came from the former Soviet Union, Estonia, Ukraine and Sweden.

The relative share of immigrants in Hyvinkää's population is below the national average. Moreover, the city's new residents are increasingly of foreign origin. This will increase the proportion of foreign residents in the coming years.

=== Religion ===
In 2023, the Evangelical Lutheran Church was the largest religious group with 62.5% of the population of Hyvinkää. Other religious groups accounted for 2.3% of the population. 35.2% of the population had no religious affiliation.

== Politics ==
Results of the 2023 Finnish parliamentary election in Hyvinkää:

- Social Democratic Party 25.2%
- Finns Party 24.9%
- National Coalition Party 21.2%
- Centre Party 5.8%
- Green League 5.6%
- Left Alliance 5.1%
- Christian Democrats 3.8%
- Freedom Alliance 1.1%
- Swedish People's Party 1.0%

== Public services ==
=== Health care ===
There are three health care centers in Hyvinkää. Hyvinkää hospital is one of largest general hospitals in Finland. The emergency unit services 24 hours in day.

=== Education ===
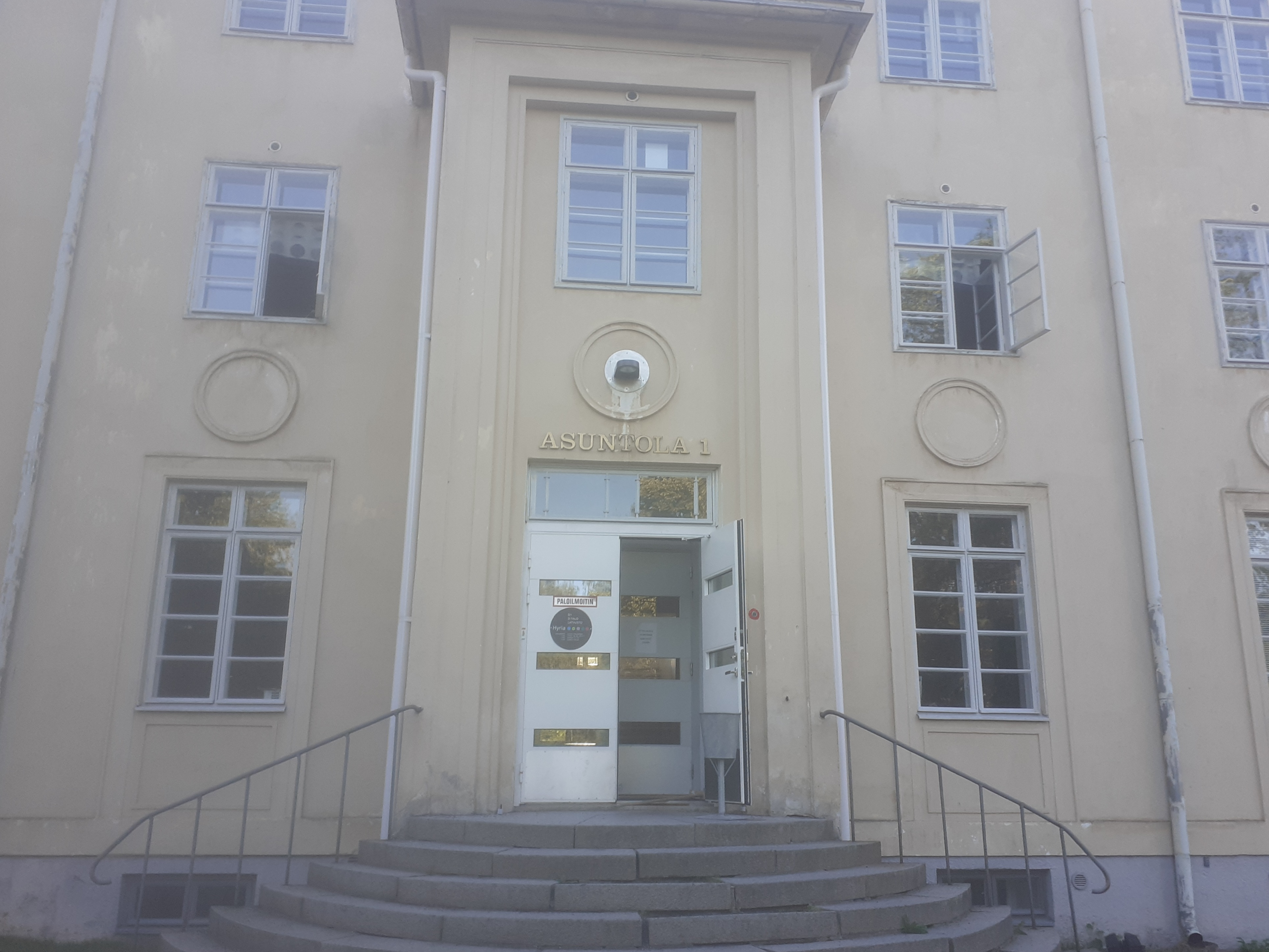
A student dormitory of the Hyria Vocational School in Hyvinkää

There are twenty primary schools in Hyvinkää: Anttila school (grades 1–2), Asema school (and the English classes of Hyvinkää), Hakala school, Hyvinkäänkylä school, Hämeenkatu school, Härkävehmas school (grades 3–9), Kaukas school, Kytäjä school, Martti school, Noppo school, Paavola school, Pohjoispuisto school (grades 7–9), Puolimatka school (grades 1–9), Ridasjärvi school, Svenska skolan i Hyvinge (Grades 1–6), Talvisilta school (Grades 1–2), Tapainlinna school (Grades 1–9), Uusikylä school and Vehkoja school (grades 3–9).

As of 2021 there is only high school in Hyvinkää following the merger of Hyvinkään yhteiskoulun lukio and Hyvinkään Sveitsin lukio.

== Transportation ==
=== Railway ===
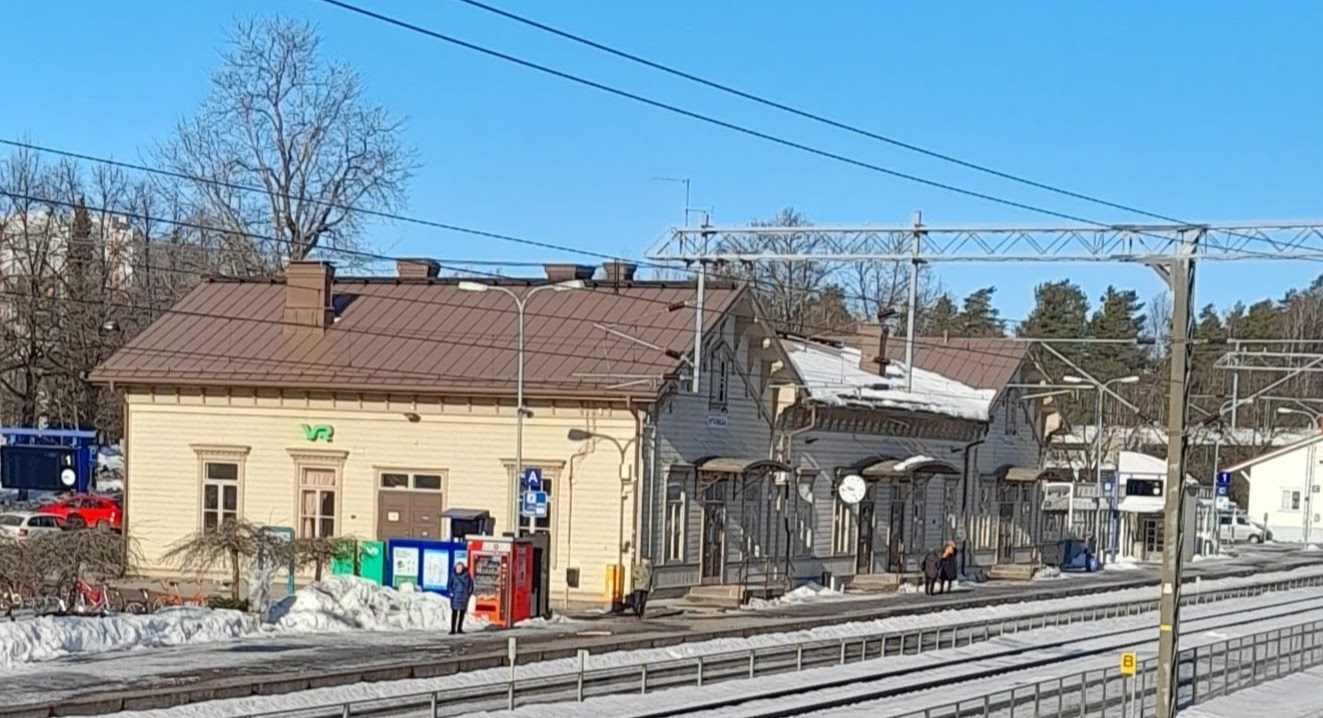
Hyvinkää railway station, the oldest building in the city centre.

Hyvinkää is an important railway city, located on the primary rail route in southern Finland. Station building is one of the original Helsinki-Hämeenlinna railway stations in original use. The city is also home to the Finnish Railway Museum and a VR maintenance area. Hyvinkää also has another railway line, the Hyvinkää-Karis railway towards Hanko (founded on 8 October 1873). Passenger traffic between Hyvinkää and Karis ended in September 1983, but the railway is still in use by VR Cargo.

=== Airfield ===
Hyvinkää airfield was the main airport of Finland in 1944–1947, when Helsinki-Malmi Airport was in use by the Allied Commission. Finnair used Hyvinkää as a major hub. Finnair's DC-3-pilots trained to fly at Hyvinkää airfield in 1948.

Since the 1950s, the airfield has mainly been in use by general aviation. Aviation clubs including Jukolan Pilotit, Mäntsälän Ilmailukerho and Hyvinkään Ilmailukerho operate from the airfield as of 2020.

=== Buses ===
The Local bus service is operated by Hyvinkään Liikenne. There are seven local bus lines.

== Sport ==
Hyvinkää has a large variety of sports. Hyvinkään Tahko plays pesäpallo at men's top league, Superpesis. Hyvinkää Falcons plays american football in nation's second level in both men's and women's league system. Hyvinkään Palloseura or HyPS plays association football in the fourth division in men's and in the fifth division in women's football. Hyvinkää has three men's ice hockey teams of which Hoki Klupi Hyvinkää plays in the fourth division and Hyvinkää Bruins and Hyvinkää Storm in the fifth division. In basketball Hyvinkään Ponteva plays in men's 1st Division B and in women's second division.

Vauhtipuisto, Hyvinkää Speedway track is a motorcycle speedway venue located to the north east of the city in the motor sport complex, adjacent to the Hyvinkaa Airfield. The complex also features a motocross and a race track. The speedway track has held the final of the Finnish Individual Speedway Championship on four occasions in 1992, 2013, 2016 and 2021.

== Festivals ==
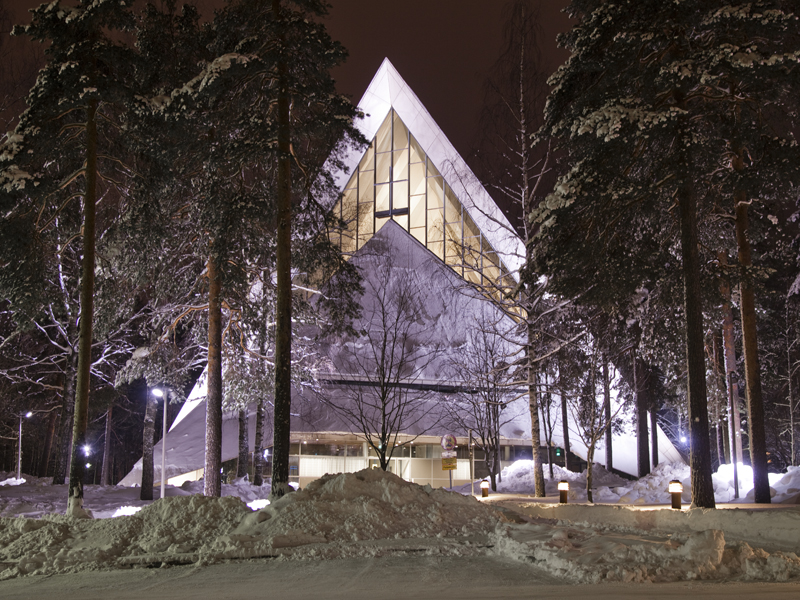
The modern church of Hyvinkää, Aarno Ruusuvuori 1961.

In the Summer, there is an annual beer festival which attracts rock bands from Scandinavia and about 10,000 visitors.

== Notable residents ==
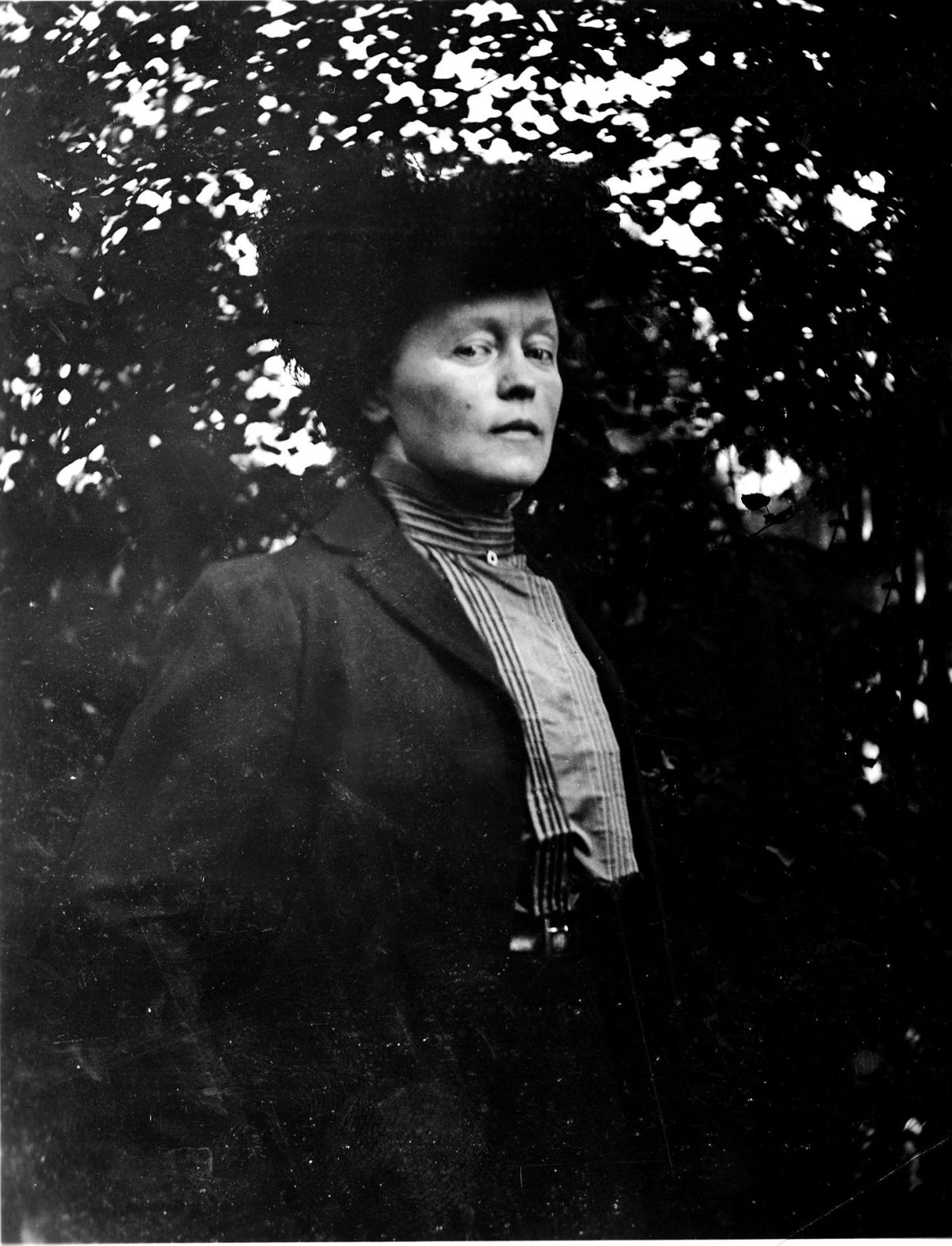
Helene Schjerfbeck

- Tomi Kalliola, musician
- Niko Kari, racing driver
- Sauli Koskinen, TV presenter living in Los Angeles
- Petri Makkonen, professional pool player
- Heikki Mikkola, motocross racer; four-time world champion
- Peetu Piiroinen, Olympic silver medallist, men's halfpipe
- Katri Rosendahl, endurance riding national champion 2007
- Juha Ruokangas, master luthier, founder of Ruokangas Guitars
- Jalmari Ruokokoski, painter
- Esa Saarinen, philosopher
- Yrjö Saarinen, painter
- Tyko Sallinen, painter
- Helene Schjerfbeck, painter
- Roni Tran Binh Trong, singer
- Lauri Tukonen, professional ice hockey player
- Markku Uusipaavalniemi, curler, politician
- Sanna Valkonen, professional football player
- Petteri Wirtanen, professional ice hockey player

== International relations ==
=== Twin towns – Sister cities ===
Hyvinkää is twinned with:

- Eigersund, Norway
- Kecskemét, Hungary
- Kostroma, Russia
- Motala, Sweden
- Hersfeld-Rotenburg district, Germany
- Kunshan, China

=== Projects ===
The educational department takes part in Lifelong Learning Programme 2007–2013 in Finland.

== See also ==
- Battle of Hyvinkää – 1918 battle of the Finnish Civil War
- Finnish national road 25
- Hanko–Hyvinkää railway
- Hausjärvi
- Hyvinkää shooting – 2012 mass shooting in Finland
- Hyvinkäänkylä
- Jarno Elg – Finnish Satanist and murderer (born 1975), known for the cannibal murder case in Hyvinkää
- Kytäjä
- Nurmijärvi
- Ridasjärvi
- Riihimäki
