= Ridasjärvi =

Village in Uusimaa, Finland

- Village
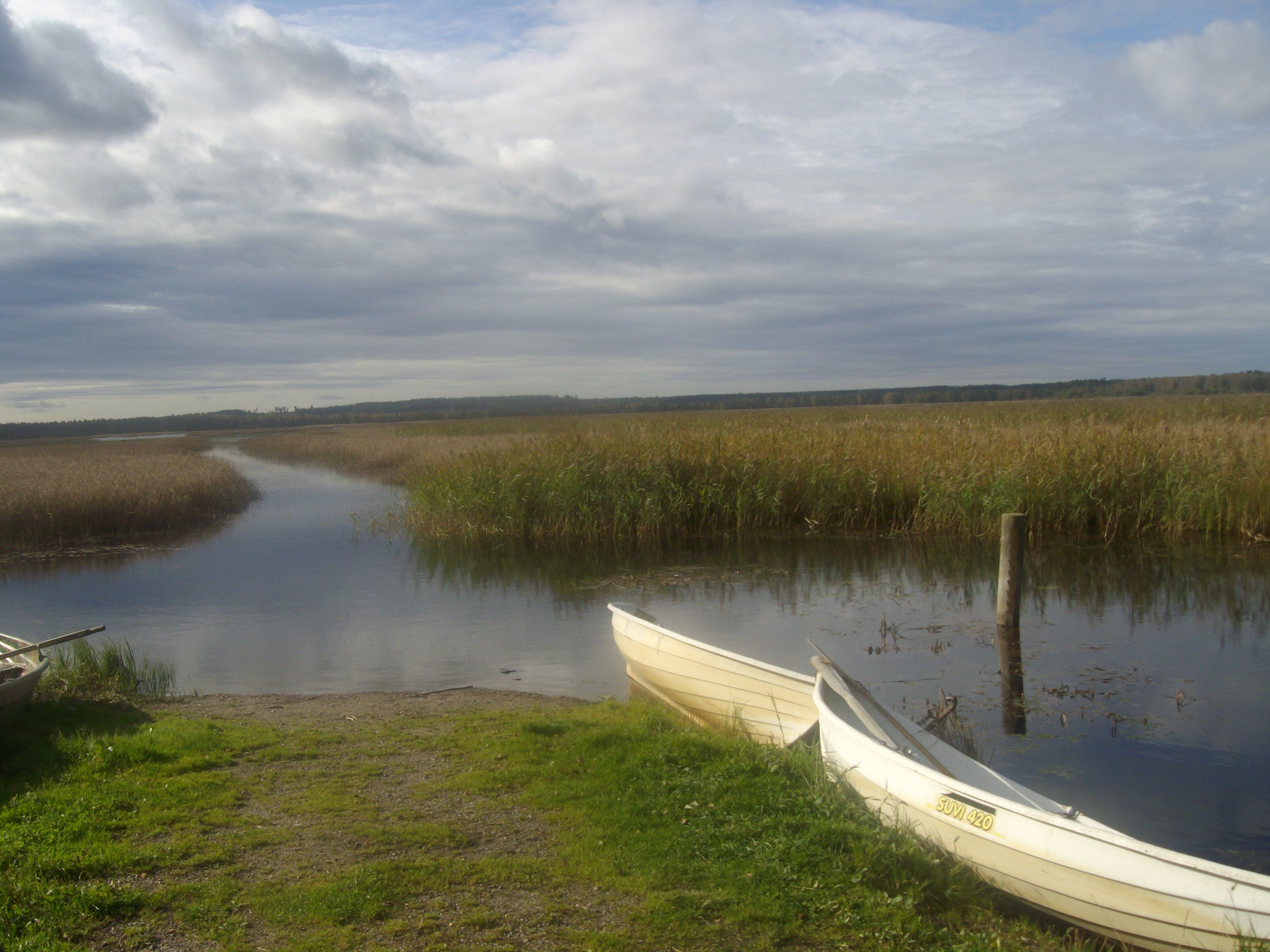
- Lake Ridasjärvi

- Location in Finland
- Coordinates: 60°38′59.93″N 24°59′43.32″E
- Country: Finland
- Region: Uusimaa
- Municipality: Hyvinkää
- Time zone: UTC+2 (EET)
  - Summer (DST): UTC+3 (EEST)
- Postal code: 05950

Ridasjärvi (Finnish: [ˈridɑsˌjærʋi]) is a village in the Hyvinkää municipality in Uusimaa, Finland, with about 400 inhabitants. It is located 10 kilometres (6.2 mi) east of the Hyvinkää's town centre near the lake of the same name.

The village operates a primary school, a drug rehabilitation center, a shooting range, and the summer café called Kylis.

== See also ==
- Finnish national road 25
- Hausjärvi
- Keravanjoki – a river starting from Lake Ridasjärvi
- Mäntsälä
