= Hyvinkäänkylä =

Village and a district in Hyvinkää, Finland

Coordinates: 60°36.00′N 24°49.00′E

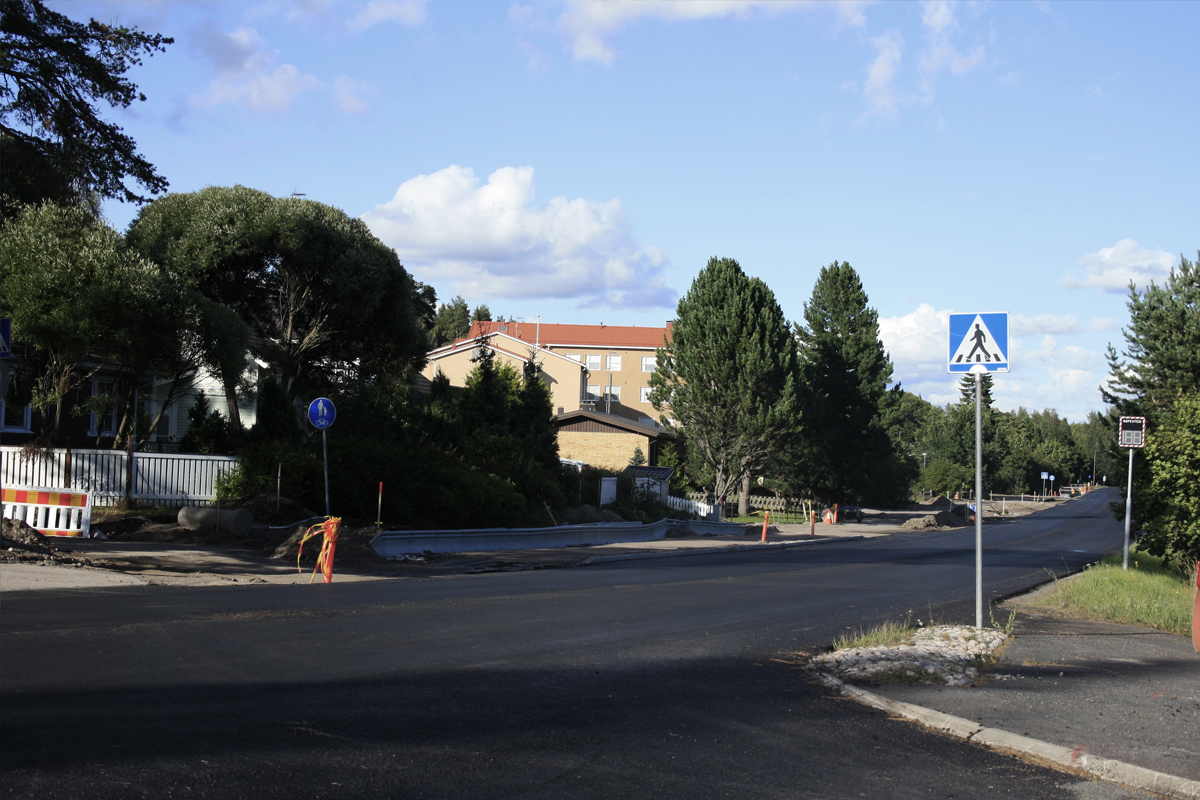
Hyvinkäänkylä in August 2014

Hyvinkäänkylä (literally "Hyvinkää's village") is a village and a district in Hyvinkää, Finland. It is located less than five kilometers southwest of the center of Hyvinkää and the Vantaa River flows at its western and southern ends. It comprises the section of the Uudenmaankatu street from Vehkoja to Åvik and its surroundings, as well as Hyvinkää Hospital. Hyvinkäänkylä is the oldest district in Hyvinkää and was first mentioned in 1495 as Höffinge. There was an inn in the 17th and 18th centuries until 1862. Hyvinkäänkylä was once part of Nurmijärvi parish before its secession in 1917 as part of the Hyvinkää borough.

Hyvinkäänkylä School began operations in 1875 and in 1891 its own building was completed. It currently serves as a youth home. The current Hyvinkäänkylä stone school was built in 1955.

== See also ==
- Kytäjä
