= Kytäjä =

Village in Uusimaa, Finland

Coordinates: 60°36.03′N 24°39.04′E

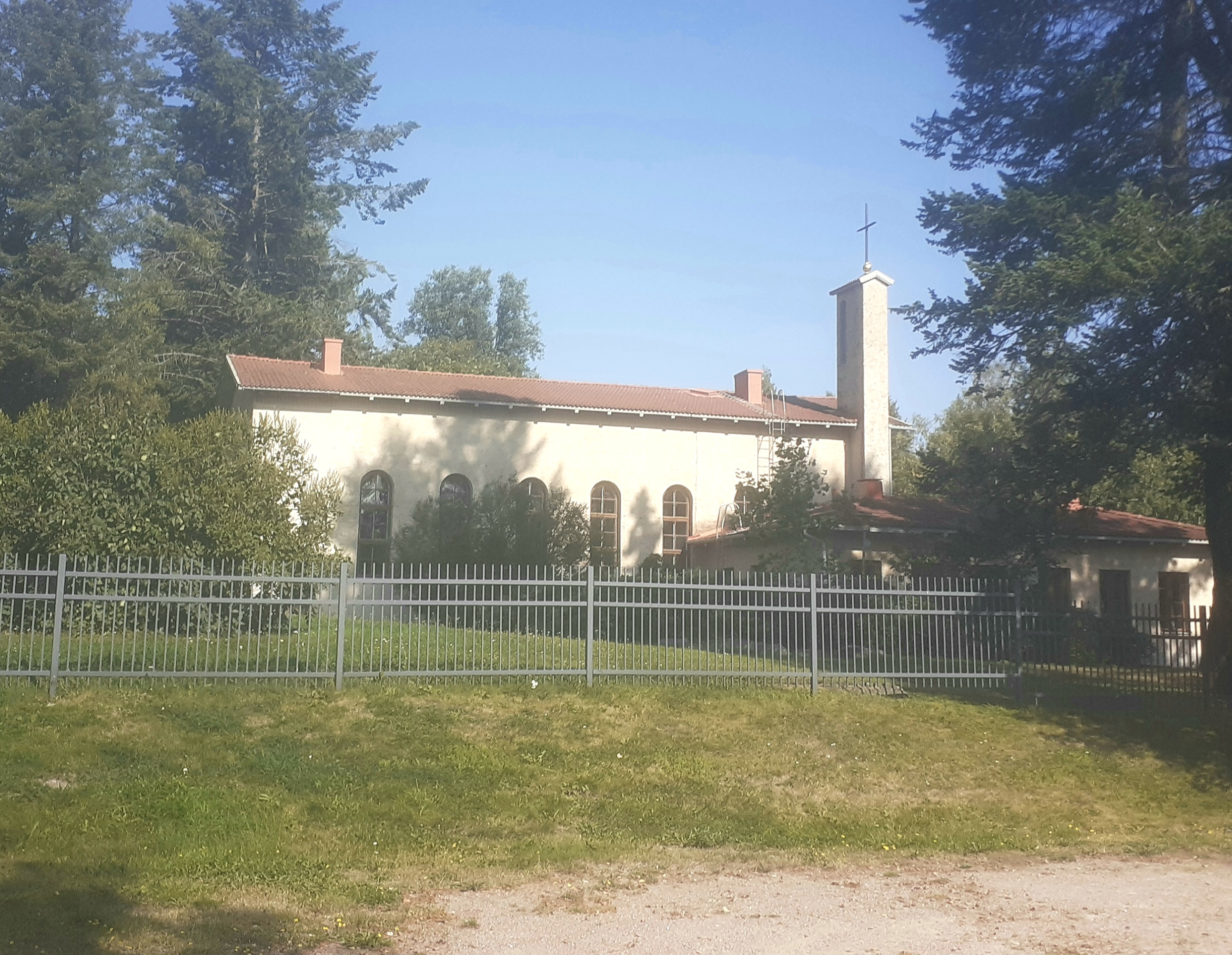
Kytäjä Church

Kytäjä (Finnish: [ˈkytæjæ]) is a village located in Hyvinkää, Finland. Kytäjä is along the connecting road 1361 about 15 kilometers west of the center of Hyvinkää and about 17 kilometers east of Loppi's Läyliäinen. Until 1917, the village belonged to the parish of Nurmijärvi and until 1968 to the rural municipality of Hyvinkää. Lake Kytäjärvi, which dominates the Kytäjä's landscape, flows down the Kytäjoki River into the Vantaa River.

At the end of the 19th century, Kytäjä Manor, located on the shores of a lake, was the largest private farm in the Nordic countries and is now notoriously known for the 1972 triple murder. Kytäjä Church was completed in 1939 and was designed by the then owner of Kytäjä Manor, Väinö Vähäkallio. The Finnish Heritage Agency has defined church as a nationally significant built cultural environment. The Rytkö School (or Näs School) in Kytäjä was founded in 1874. The Kivisenoja School, founded in 1903, was closed in 1993. In the vicinity of the church there is a clubhouse called Kytäjän Maapirtti.

There is a bus line between Kytäjä and the center of Hyvinkää. The Hyvinkää–Karkkila railway passed through Kytäjä in 1918–1967. Railway station was closed in 1967 when the railway was demolished. The station building is still left.

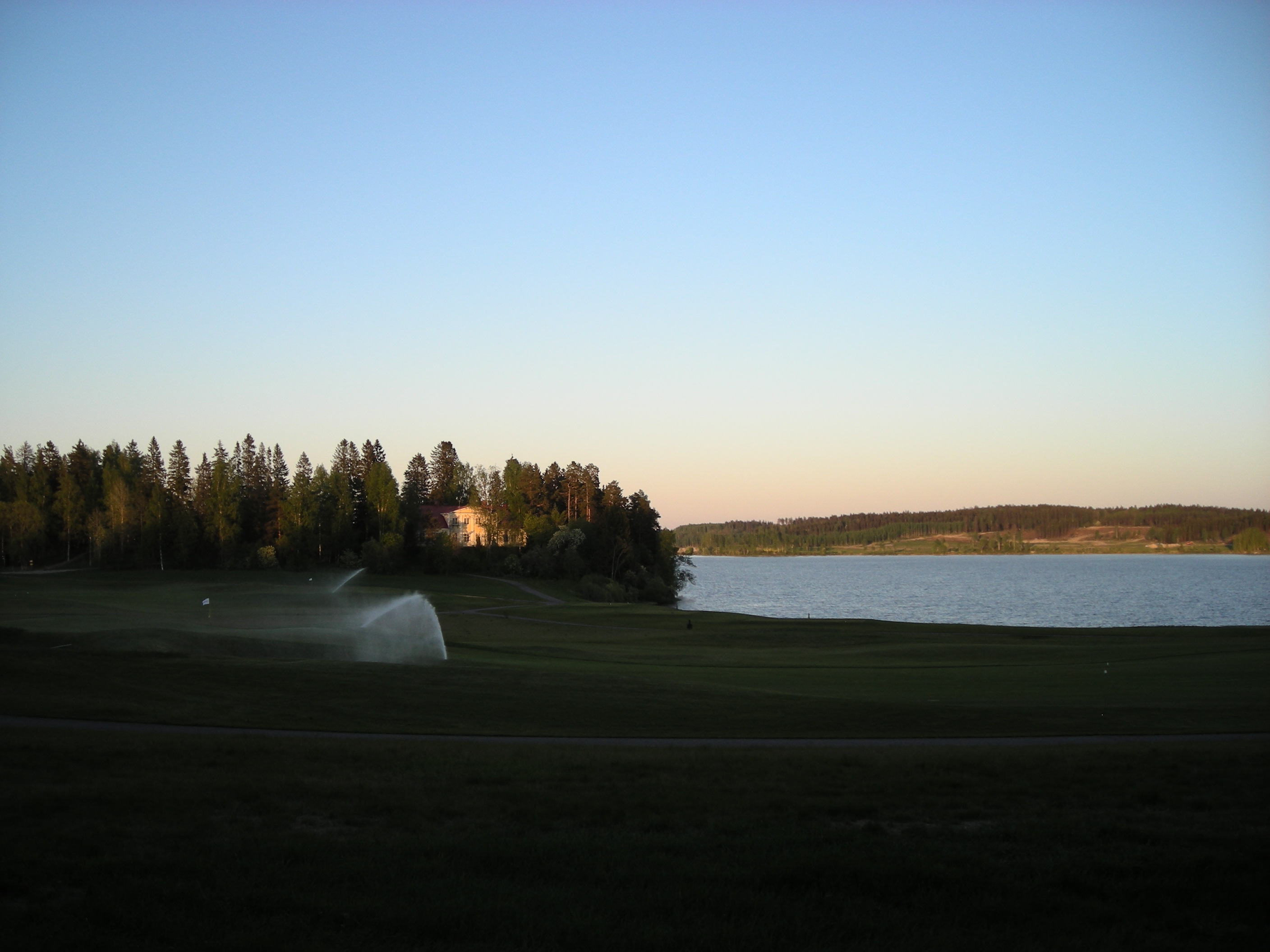
Kytäjä Golf

Kytäjä Golf course is one of the largest golf courses in Finland.

== See also ==
- Herunen
- Hyvinkäänkylä

== Sources ==
=== Literature ===
- Katri Lehto (1989). Maria Heikintytär Kytäjältä – Ihmisiä ja kohtaloita 1700-luvun Suomessa (in Finnish). Otava. ISBN 951-1-10358-X.
- Aake Pesonen (1983). Kytäjä, kohtalon kartano (in Finnish). Kirjayhtymä. ISBN 951-26-2497-4.
- Väinö Talvio (1971). Minun Kytäjäni (in Finnish). Omakustanne.
