= Hyvinkää railway station =

Railway station in Hyvinkää, Finland

Hyvinkää Hyvinge
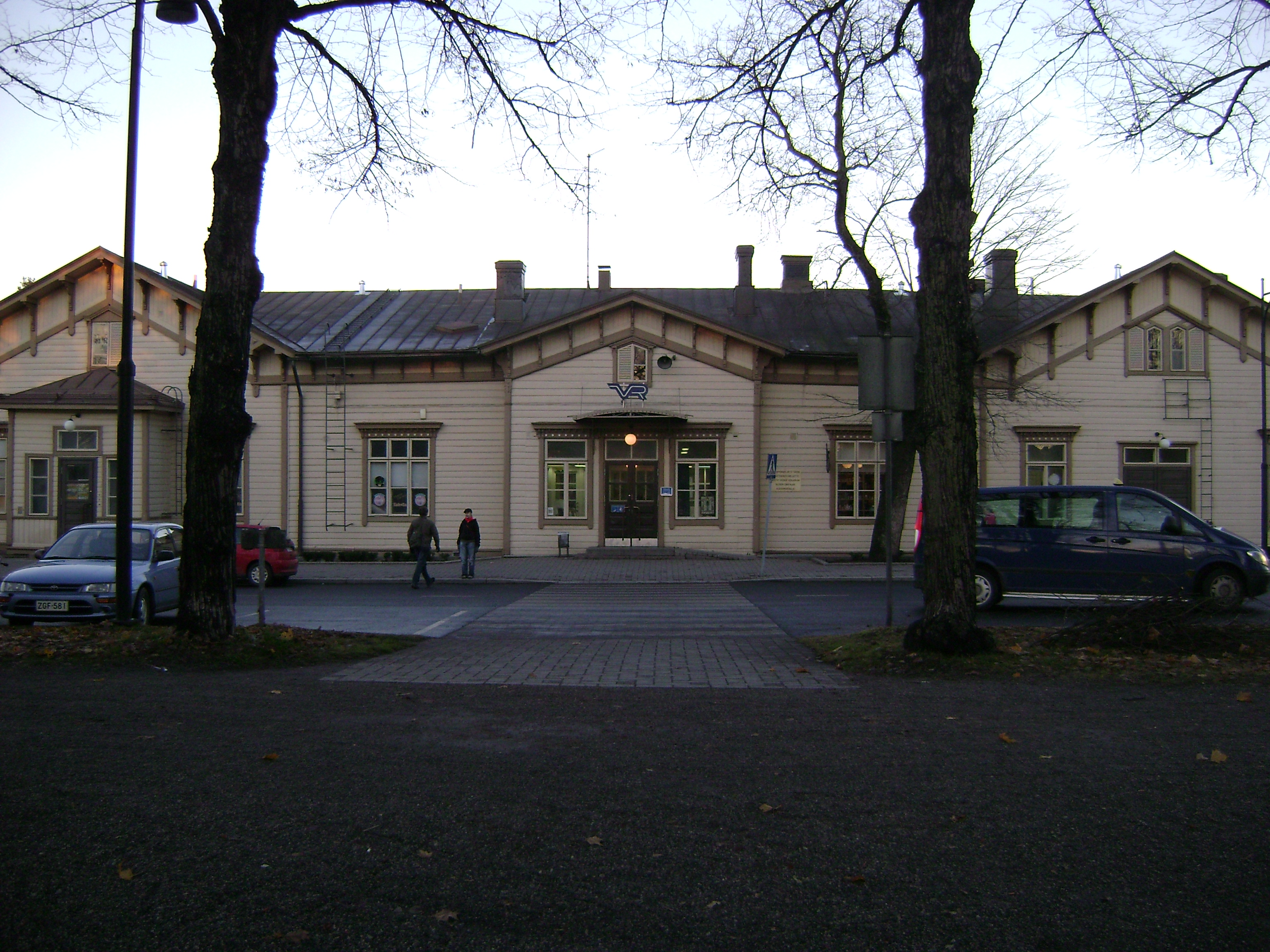

General information
- Location: Rautatienkatu 9, 05800; Hyvinkää; Finland
- Coordinates: 60°37′53″N 024°51′28″E
- System: VR station
- Owner: Finnish Transport Infrastructure Agency
- Operator: VR Group
- Lines: Helsinki–Riihimäki; Hyvinkää–Karis
- Platforms: 1 side platform 1 island platform

Construction
- Structure type: At-grade

Other information
- Station code: Hy
- Classification: Operating point

History
- Opened: 17 March 1862

Passengers
- 2015: 6,396 daily

Services
Preceding station	VR commuter rail	Following station
Jokela towards Helsinki	R	Riihimäki towards Riihimäki or Tampere
Jokela towards Helsinki	T	Riihimäki Terminus
Järvenpää towards Helsinki	D	Riihimäki towards Riihimäki or Hämeenlinna
Location

Hyvinkää railway station (Finnish: Hyvinkään rautatieasema, Swedish: Hyvinge järnvägsstation) is located in Hyvinkää, Finland, approximately 60 kilometres (37 mi) north of Helsinki Central railway station. It is situated between the stations of Jokela and Riihimäki.

The station serves the D, R and T commuter rail lines between Helsinki and the Riihimäki terminus to the north.

The Finnish Heritage Agency has classified Hyvinkää railway station as a nationally significant built cultural environment.

== History ==
Hyvinkää railway station was one of the first railway stations in Finland established on the country's first railway line in 1862. The plans for a station building were made by architect Carl Albert Edelfelt in 1860 but they were never used. Instead, a station building was completed at the Hyvinkää station in 1863 according to another plans made by Carl Albert Edelfelt, which were originally meant for the Riihimäki station. The station building completed in 1863 originally had Swiss influences but during later modifications the style of the building has changed into Renaissance Revival.

Hyvinkää became a junction station in 1873, when a private railway was completed between Hyvinkää and Hanko. The Hyvinkää–Hanko railway line was acquired by Finnish State Railways already in 1875. A separate station had also been established at Hyvinkää on the Hyvinkää–Hanko line, with a station building designed by architect Knut Nylander. This station building along with the other nearby railway buildings currently house the exhibitions of the Finnish Railway Museum that has operated there since 1974. In 1911, a railway line to Karkkila serving both passenger and freight traffic was fully completed. In 1949, a workshop for locomotives was established in the town.

Passenger traffic on the Hyvinkää–Karkkila line ceased in 1961 followed by freight traffic in 1967. The railway line was torn down the same decade. Passenger traffic on the Hyvinkää–Hanko line ceased between Hyvinkää and Karis stations in 1983 and since then there has only been freight traffic between the stations.

A rail accident occurred on the northern side of the railway station on January 28, 1981, when a northbound express train collided with a truck carrying gravel on a temporary railway crossing. Five people were killed and 15 were injured in the accident.

== Departure tracks ==
Hyvinkää railway station has five tracks, of which tracks 1, 4 and 5 have a platform. Track 5 is currently unused by the passenger trains that stop at the station.

- Track 1 is used by commuter trains D, R and T to Helsinki.
- Track 4 is used by commuter trains D, R and T to Riihimäki.
