= Måns Groundstroem =

Finnish musician

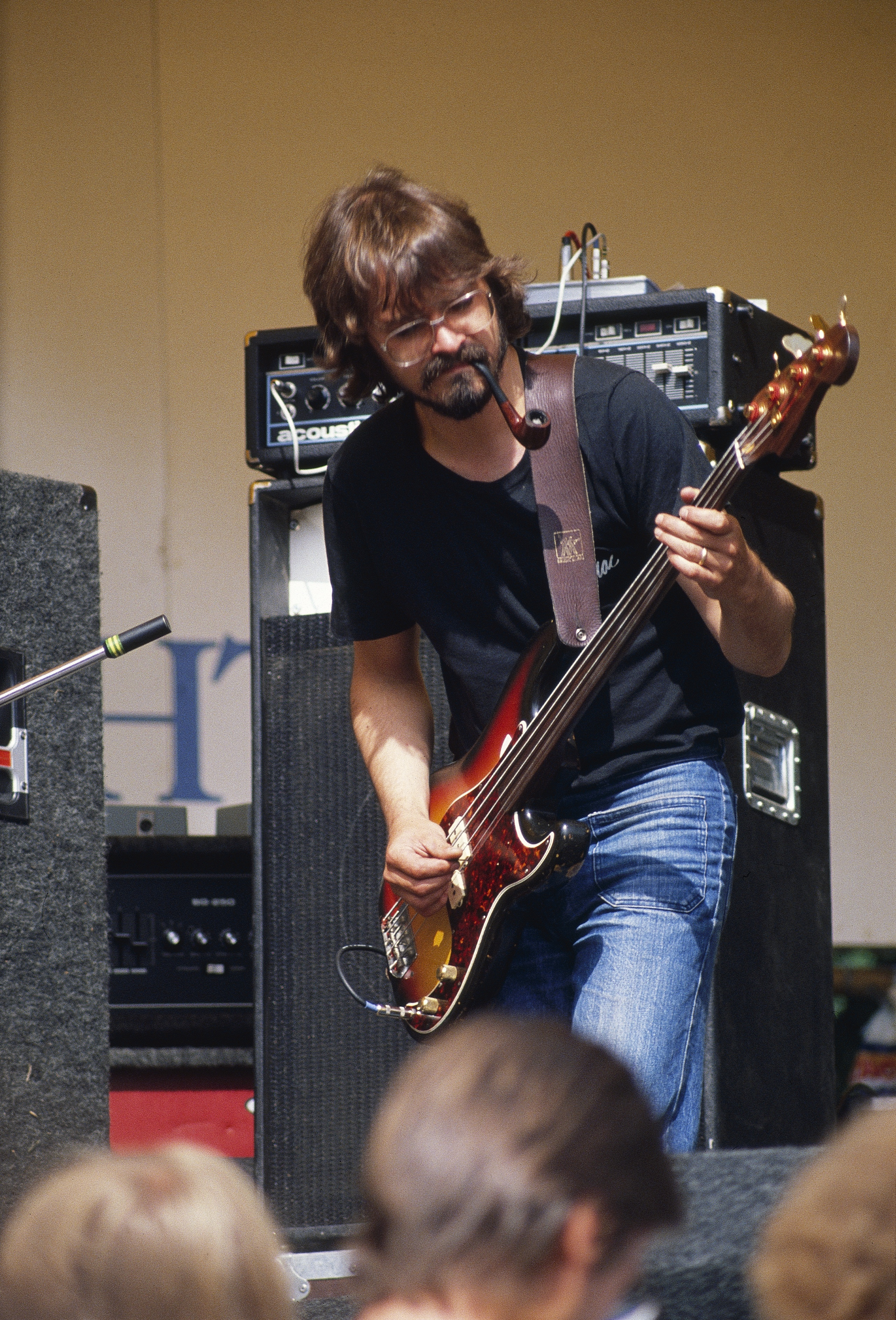
Måns Groundstroem probably in 1983.

Måns Ivar Åkesson "Måsse" Groundstroem [grʊndström] (born April 23, 1949) is a Finnish bass player, studio technician and music producer. He has recorded ca. 100 music albums and produced another 70 albums. Most of these albums were released by Love Records.

== Early life ==
Groundstroem grew up in the Töölö neighbourhood in Helsinki, in an educated bourgeoisie family. Even before he went to school, he was sent to piano lessons, but he was not excited about classical piano music. "I had absolutely no touch for playing classical music. In fact, I used to hate that form of terror. At that time, that is." However, his father bought him a guitar, and thus Groundstroem was able to "rebel with rock music, which at the time was turning young people wild". During these early years, Groundstroem played in bands called Typhoons, Pems and Roosters. Already in 1965 he was playing semiprofessionally, and the following year he made his recording debut on Jukka Kuoppamäki’s album Mitä kansa haluaa (‘What the people want’).

== Career ==
Groundstroem played in three prominent Finnish rock bands in succession. These were Blues Section and the progressive rock bands Tasavallan Presidentti and Wigwam. Of these Blues Section was the first band to release a record through Love Records and Wigwam the last. In Wigwam, Groundstroem was the longest serving bass player (1974–2003).

Since 1971, Groundstroem became known as a music producer and audio engineer. He produced albums for e.g. Jukka Tolonen, Jim Pembroke, Pekka Pohjola, Dave Lindholm, Juice Leskinen, Albert Järvinen, Muska, Maarit as well as for Hurriganes and Kaseva.

“Most of the time I was given new artists to produce. If I was successful with them, a real professional was hired for the following album. […] Being a producer was essentially a practical job – it included planning, drawing up schedules and staying up late. Little by little I tried to assume a musical role, encouraging and motivating the musicians, and even that of an arbiter of taste." When punk rock and new wave music emerged, he was no longer a hot item in the field of rhythm music, and he left the business and trained as a cook, in which job he worked for five years in the 1980s.

In the early 1990s, Groundstroem had to give up his career as a cook, due to psoriasis. The disease cause the skin of his hands to flake. He then returned to music producing and bass playing, just in time for the re-emergence of Tasavallan Presidentti and Wigwam. He continued to play with these bands until 2004, when his psoriasis got worse and he had to go to disability pension.

In 2007, Groundstroem was granted artist's pension. During the last few years Groundstroem has played with Wigwam Revisited, which consists of former Wigwam members. He has also worked as an engineer and producer for a few record releases.

Akipekka Alanko plays Groundstroem in the film Love Records – Anna mulle Lovee, and Niklas Groundstroem has played him in the radio drama Itkisitkö onnesta?

== Måns Groundstroem discography ==
=== LPs and CDs ===
- Blues Section: Blues Section (bass, 1967)
- Tasavallan Presidentti: Tasavallan Presidentti (bass, 1969)
- Pekka Streng: Magneettimiehen kuolema (bass, 1970)
- Ferris: Ferris (production, 1971)
- Tasavallan Presidentti: Tasavallan Presidentti (II) (bass, 1971)
- Jukka Tolonen: Tolonen! (production, 1971)
- Kirka: Nykyaikaa (bass, organ, electric piano and production, 1972)
- "Isokynä" Lindholm: "Isokynä" Lindholm (production together with Ronnie Österberg, 1972)
- Hot Thumbs O'Riley: Wicked Ivory (production, 1972)
- Pihasoittajat: Rocky Road To Dublin (production, 1972)
- Pekka Pohjola: Pihkasilmä kaarnakorva (production, 1972)
- Pekka Streng: Kesämaa (production together with Pekka Streng, Hasse Wall and Atte Blom, 1972)
- Tasavallan Presidentti: Lambertland (bass, 1972)
- Carita Holmström: We Are What We Do (bass,1973)
- Hurriganes: Rock And Roll All Night Long (engineering and production, 1973)
- Juice Leskinen & Coitus Int: Juice Leskinen & Coitus Int (bass, engineering and production, 1973)
- Isokynä Lindholm: Sirkus (bass, electric piano and production, 1973)
- Maarit: Maarit (production together with Otto Donner and Atte Blom, 1973)
- Muska: Muska (arrangements, 1973)
- Pihasoittajat: Hattukauppiaan aamu (production, 1973)
- Quilapayún: El pueblo unido jamás será vencido (engineering together with Erkki Hyvönen, 1973)
- Jukka Tolonen: Summer Games (production, 1973)
- Esa Helasvuo: Omat hommat (production, 1974)
- Isokynä & Orfeus: Musiikkia (production together with Janne Ödner, 1974)
- Albert Järvinen: Ride On (production, 1974)
- Kaseva: Silloin kun (production, 1974)
- Pekka Laitinen: Korppien kokous (bass and production together with Pekka Laitinen, 1974)
- Magyar: Uusiin maisemiin (production, 1974)
- Jim Pembroke: Pigworm (production, 1974)
- Pekka Pohjola: Harakka Bialoipokku (production, 1974)
- Rauli Badding Somerjoki: Näin käy rock & roll (bass and production together with M. A. Numminen, 1974)
- Jukka Tolonen: The Hook (production, 1974)
- Wigwam: Being (production, 1974)
- Olli Ahvenlahti: Bandstand (production, 1975)
- Anki: En anna heille anteeksi (music and words for "Hän kahlaa kanssasi halki tulppaanien", 1975)
- Finnforest: Finnforest (production, 1975)
- Jukka Hauru: Episode (mixing, 1975)
- Pihasoittajat: Kontaten kotia (production together with Otto Donner, 1975)
- Rauli Badding Somerjoki: Sydän lämpöä täys (arrangement for “Feel Love”, 1975)
- Tabula Rasa: Tabula Rasa (production, 1975)
- Wigwam: Live Music From The Twilight Zone (production and engineering, 1975)
- Wigwam: Nuclear Nightclub (bass, 1975)
- Mikko Alatalo: Hasardi (bass, 1976)
- Finnforest: Lähtö matkalle (production, 1976)
- Mike Koskinen: Sunwebs (production together with Make Lievonen, 1976)
- Mike Westhues: A Man Name 'A Jones (production together with Affe Forsman and Mike Westhues, 1976)
- Wigwam: The Lucky Golden Stripes And Starpose (bass, 1976)
- Arkiviisu: Tomuinen tie; Woody Guthrien lauluja (bass, 1977)
- Madame George: Revolution & Roller (engineering, 1977)
- Jim Pembroke: Corporal Cauliflowers Mental Function (production together with Ronnie Österberg, 1977)
- Jukka Tolonen: A Passenger To Paramaribo (bass, 1977)
- Wigwam: Dark Album (bass, 1977)
- Remu Aaltonen: No Panic (bass, 1978)
- Bon Bon: Bon Bon (engineering together with Paul Jyrälä and Wallenius, 1978)
- Boxcar: Necktie Party (bass and violin, 1978)
- Kontra: Kontran toinen puoli (engineering, 1978)
- Pen Lee: Nouveau (engineering together with Reino Iso-Aho, 1978)
- Jimi Sumén: Key West (engineering, 1978)
- Joe Davidow: Continuity (bass, 1979)
- Kojo: So Mean (engineering, 1979)
- Mika & Turkka Mali: Tyykikylään takaisin (engineering, 1979)
- Pelle Miljoona 1980: Pelko ja viha (engineering together with Reino Iso-aho and Heikki Hölttä, 1979)
- Wigwam: Rumours On The Rebound (bass; compilation, 1979)
- Eero and Jussi: Hämeentie 38 (bass, 1980)
- Various: Tavastia live! ("Get That Funk", bass and arrangement together with Hasse Wall, Billy Carson and Jimi Sumén, 1980)
- Jukka Tolonen: High Flyin' (engineering and production, 1980)
- Maukka Perusjätkä: Koiranpennut (engineering, 1981)
- Pete Malmi: Malmi (engineering together with Risto Hemmi, 1981)
- Threshold: Paradise Now (production together with Ari Taskinen, 1981)
- Uuge Päts: Classified Brains (production, 1981)
- Leevi and the Leavings: Mies, joka toi rock´n´rollin Suomeen (engineering, 1981)
- Bluesounds: Here Come The Golden Hearts (engineering together with Risto Hemmi and Markus Vikstedt, 1982)
- Tuomari Nurmio: Punainen planeetta (engineering together with Risto Hemmi, 1982)
- Ratsia: Jäljet (engineering, 1982)
- SIG: Vuosisadan rakkaustarina (engineering and production, 1982 – the cover give erroneous credit to Gösta Sundqvist
- Jukka Tolonen: In A This Year Time (engineering and production, 1982)
- Edward Vesala / Arto Melleri: Mau-Mau (bass and engineering together with Markus Vikstedt, 1982)
- Tumppi Varonen & Problems: Kaupungin valot (engineering together with Markus Vikstedt, 1982)
- Briard: Miss World (engineering together with Jimi Sumén, 1983)
- Pelle Miljoona: Laulava idiootti (organ and production, 1983)
- Liisa Tavi: Naamiot (engineering, 1984)
- Kauko Röyhkä & Narttu: Mieluummin vanha kuin aikuinen (engineering/production (partly), 1987)
- Make Lievonen – Jarmo Savolainen: Loru (engineering and mixing, 1988)
- Wigwam: Classics – The Rarest (bass; compilation, 1990)
- Piirpauke: Tuku tuku (engineering together with Lasse Didriksson, 1991)
- Sue Van Doe: Ruma (bass, arrangements together with Vando Suvanto and Henrik Duncker, 1993)
- Wigwam: Light Ages (bass, 1993)
- Don Huonot: Kaksoisolento (sequence, 1995)
- Remu: In The Spirit Of Hurriganes (bass, 1995)
- Vando Suvanto: Hengenmiehet ei hellitä (bass, 1995)
- Wigwam: Highlights (bass and production; compilation, 1996)
- Hamid Daniel Irannezhad: Baghebane baghe ma (mixing, 1997)
- Kantakaupungin leijuva pöly: Rakkaus panee kaiken sekaisin (engineering and mixing, 1998)
- Kantakaupungin leijuva pöly: Askeleet (engineering and mixing, 1999)
- Nollaseiska: Mä en tahdo tietää (engineering, 1999)
- Nollaseiska: Saat vihata maailmaa (engineering, 1999)
- Uzva: Tammikuinen Tammela (engineering, 1999)
- Wigwam: Fresh Garbage – Rarities 1969–1977 (bass, 2000)
- Hasse Walli: Todellinen live (bass, 2001)
- Wigwam: Wigwam Plays Wigwam – Live (bass, 2001)
- Tasavallan Presidentti: Still Struggling For Freedom (bass, 2001)
- Tajuvana: Ohi pelon, läpi valon (engineering and production, 2002)
- Piirpauke: Sillat (engineering Tapio Ylitalon kanssa, 2002)
- Uzva: Niittoaika (engineering, 2002)
- Wigwam: Titans Wheel (bass, 2002)
- Wigwam: Parhaat (bass and production; compilation, 2009)

=== Singles, EPs and other minor recordings ===
- Blues Section: Call Me On Your Telephone / Only Dreaming (single) (bass, 1967)
- Blues Section: Hey Hey Hey / Shivers Of Pleasure (single) (bass, 1967)
- Jormas: Rööperiin / Kuin yö (single) (piano and organ, 1967)
- Kirka: Anna suukko vain / Silloin ihminen kaunein on (single) (bass, 1967)
- Roosters: Crying In The Rain / See See Rider (single) (organ, 1967)
- Tasavallan Presidentti: Time Alone With You / Obsolete Machine (single) (bass, 1969)
- Kirka Babitzin & Tasavallan Presidentti: Saat kaiken / Kaukainen valo (single) (bass, 1970)
- Tasavallan Presidentti: Solitary / Deep Thinker (single) (bass, 1970)
- Tasavallan Presidentti: Sisältäni portin löysin / Selvä näkijä (single) (bass, 1972)
- Rauli Badding Somerjoki & Seppo Hovi Beat Group: Fiilaten and höyläten / Mikset nuku, sisko pieni (single) (production together with M. A. Numminen, 1973)
- Jari Lampinen: Rakkikoira / Tanssikengät (single) (production, 1974)
- Markku Into and Intomielet: Keitä, keitä kahvinkeitin (single) (bass, 1974)
- Wigwam: Freddie Are You Ready / Kite (single) (bass, 1975)
- Wigwam: Tramdriver / Wardance (single) (bass, 1975)
- Donna: Muinainen kaunotar / Epilogi (single) (piano, electric piano and production, 1976)
- Dusty Ramblers: Oi mutsi mutsi (EP) (engineering and production, 1977)
- Dance: Nevada By Sunset / Flying High (single) (engineering, 1977)
- Pelle Miljoona: Lähdetään kiitämään / Meidän on tulevaisuus (single) (bass, 1978)
- Kumma Heppu & Lopunajan Voidellut: Minä and hän / Kuvat (single) (engineering, 1982)
- 22-Pistepirkko: 22-Pistepirkko (EP) (engineering, 1983)
- Loop Garoo: Ghost Riders (In The Sky) / Le Baron Criminel (maxi-single) (music and arrangements with Mats Huldén, 1983)
- Wigwam: Borders To Be Crossed / Planetstar (single) (bass, 1993)
- Ari-Boy & Tähtivieraat (EP) (engineering, 1997)
- Noidankehä (single) (engineering and mixing, 2000)
- HerraPiruetti: Näin meillä (EP) (engineering and mixing, 2001)
- Sekasorto (demo) (engineering, 2001)
- Radle (demo) (production, 2001)
- Beaner: The 303 (demo) (mixing and mastering, 2002)
- Jalankulkuämpäri: TIP – Texas – Texas-remix (single) (engineering together with Mats Huldén, 2002)
- Wigwam: Heaven In A Modern World (radio edit) / Heaven In A Modern World (album version) (single) (bass, 2002)
- Wigwam: Drive On Driver / The Lost Lizard King (Ababacab) (single) (bass, 2002)
- Kikka & Lipsaset feat. Kimi Hendrix: Tulin maistamaan mansikkavaahtoa (engineering and production, 2010)
