= Tombstone Valentine =

Studio album by Wigwam
- Released: November 1970
- Recorded: 1970
- Genre: Progressive rock
- Length: 35:35
- Label: Love Records (Finland), Verve Forecast (US)
- Producer: Kim Fowley

Wigwam chronology
Hard 'n' Horny (1969)	Tombstone Valentine (1970)	Fairyport (1971)

Tombstone Valentine is a studio album released by Wigwam in 1970. While the previous album Hard 'n' Horny was more of a jazz influenced album, Tombstone Valentine in one of their more pop-ish albums. The album sounds more like the records of the "Deep Pop" era (Nuclear Nightclub, Lucky Golden Stripes and Starpose) than the records of the progressive rock era (Hard 'n' Horny, Fairyport and Being).

This is the first album with Pekka Pohjola in the band, replacing bassist Mats Huldén. Guitarist Nikke Nikamo also left after Hard 'n' Horny, but a permanent replacement for him could not be found, so Jukka Tolonen of Tasavallan Presidentti plays guitar on some of the tracks. Tombstone Valentine represents the sound they forsook for the next two progressive albums, Fairyport and Being.

Unlike the other Wigwam albums, this was produced by "non-Finnish" producer, the American Kim Fowley. The track "The Dance of the Anthropoids" is not a Wigwam track, but an experimental electronic piece by Erkki Kurenniemi, recorded in 1968 originally. Kim Fowley thought it was so brilliant that it had to be on the album.

== Track listing ==
1. "Tombstone Valentine" - 3:03
2. "In Gratitude" - 3:44
3. "The Dance of the Anthropoids - 1:07
4. "Frederick & Bill" - 4:23
5. "Wishful Thinker" - 3:44
6. "Autograph" - 2:36
7. "1936 Lost in the Snow" - 2:09
8. "Let the World Ramble On" - 3:19
9. "For America" - 4:19
10. "Captain Supernatural" - 3:01
11. "End" - 3:36

== Personnel ==
Wigwam

- Jukka Gustavson - vocals, organ, piano
- Jim Pembroke - vocals
- Pekka Pohjola - bass, violin
- Ronnie Österberg - drums

Additional musicians

- Heikki Laurila - guitar, banjo
- Jukka Tolonen - guitar
- Kalevi Nyqvist - accordion
- Erkki Kurenniemi - Andromatic
