= Hasse Walli =

Finnish musician

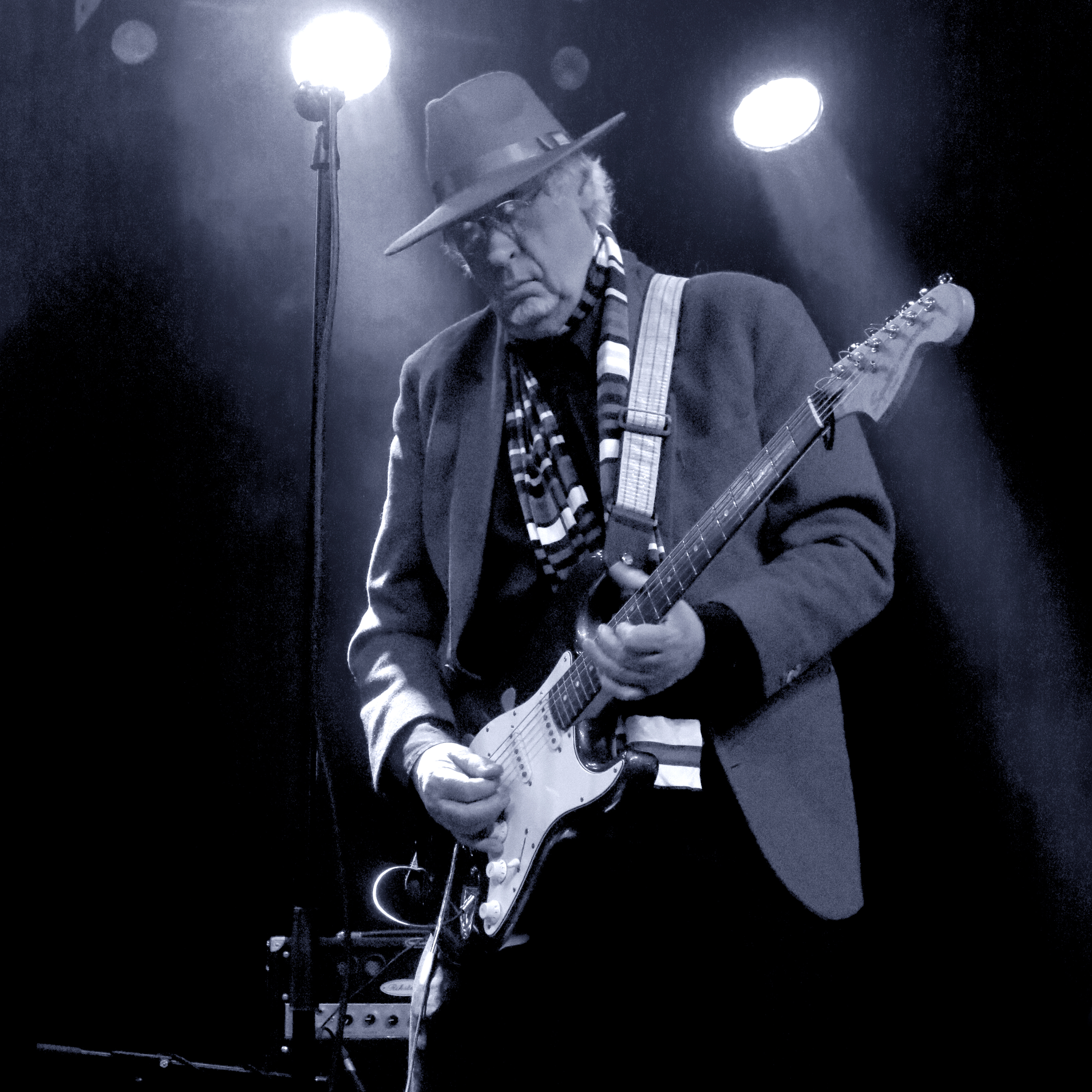
- Hasse Walli performing in Helsinki on his 75th birthday in 2023.
- Born: February 10, 1948 (age 77); Helsinki
- Occupation: Musician
- Known for: Blues Section, Piirpauke

Hannes Mikael Waldemar "Hasse" Walli (born 10 February 1948) is a Finnish guitarist. His father Aarno Walli was a musician and bandleader, his mother Anne-Marie Strandberg a singer. Hasse Walli was about ten years old when he started playing drums. He drummed in various bands in early 1960s such as The Islanders, The Electric Five and Nameless. Gradually Walli switched from drums to electric guitar. After Nameless had split, Walli started as a solo guitarist in The Typhoons. The Typhoons split when its members had to join the obligatory military service.

== Professional career ==
In spring 1966 Walli launched his professional musical career as guitarist when he started playing with Jormas, a band which was extremely popular not only in Finland but in the rest of Scandinavia too. During the seven months Hasse Walli spent in Jormas, they toured expansively Finland, Sweden and Denmark, Walli also appearing on the band's album and singles. Again, Jormas split too when its members had to join military service; Walli finding soon himself doing a brief stint in The Frankies of Johnny Liebkind. However, soon Hasse Walli became frustrated in having to play soft pop, when the rawer sounds of The Yardbirds and John Mayall's Bluesbreakers (which especially inspired Walli) started to make waves in the mid-60s rock scene.

With his friend Måns Groundstroem, Edward Vesala (who was not to spend a lot of time in the band) and British expatriate Jim Pembroke, Walli initiated a new band dedicated to this sound, which was baptized Blues Section, and which was to become a groundbreaking act in the whole Finnish rock scene. Another great inspiration to Blues Section was the Jimi Hendrix gig in May 1967 at Kulttuuritalo, Helsinki. Blues Section lasted until the late 1968, during which time Walli recorded with the band their seminal eponymous album, several singles, film music and other material later to be heard on various collection albums, and played over 150 live gigs. During this period Walli also played guitar in the jazz band Otto Donner Treatment, the composer-musician Henrik Otto Donner being the essential and extremely innovative producer figure behind Blues Section and their record label Love Records.

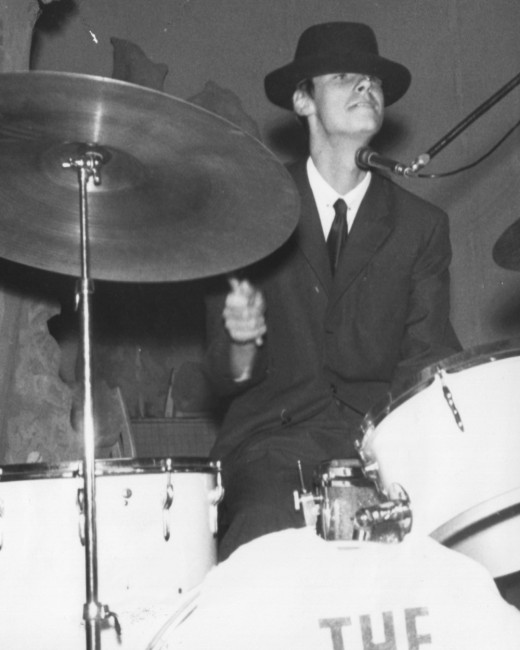
Hasse Walli playing drums in the 1960s

Following the split of Blues Section, Hasse Walli played for some time in the band of light pop singer Tapani Kansa and as a bar musician at the restaurant Fennia. In summer 1969 Walli was planning a new band called Paradise with the former Jormas members Pepe Willberg, Kikke Bergholm and Matti Oiling, which never came into being, though Willberg later on used the name Paradise with his own band. On 31 August 1969 Hasse Walli was involved in a car accident which interrupted his career for a while after when he was returning from a gig. Walli's injured left hand was operated and the guitarist, forced to take a break from playing, spent some time in the bohemian circles of Copenhagen, leading a vagrant life also as a street musician in French Riviera.

After returning to Finland, Hasse Walli played for a while with Kirka & D'Islanders, in a band called Zeus producing Vesa-Matti Loiri's first album 4+20 and collaborating with jazz musician Make Lievonen. Hasse Walli Eternal Band was a jazzy project which worked under different line-ups from 1968 to 1971, playing among all at the first Ruisrock festival of Turku in 1970. Other jazz projects of this period where Walli contributed were Irina Milan & Tabu, Simo Big Band, Carita Holmström's backing band, Paroni Paakkunainen & Unisono and German Heinz Sauer-Günther Lenz Quintet; furthermore, he played with Edward Vesala and Junnu Aaltonen, also at Afrikan Tähti band of pop singer Maarit. Walli's Punainen Lanka ensemble where Eija Ahvo and Harri Saksala sang and which explored folk music of Finland and America, was part of 70s leftist political song movement gaining strong foothold in Finland.

The band Piirpauke, combining folk music, ethnic sounds (later to be known as world music) to progressive jazz rock, was one of Hasse Walli's best-known musical projects, starting in 1975. The major figure in the band was Sakari Kukko, a multi-instrumentalist playing saxophone, flute and keyboards, who had played with Walli in various ensembles, Kukko-Walli Quartet among them. The best known Piirpauke track is the hypnotic Konevitsan kirkonkellot from the band's eponymous 1975 debut album, based on a traditional Karelian folk song. The band had an enormous live success and Hasse Walli stayed in Piirpauke about three years, later returning to the band for its tours in 1983 and 1994.

In the late 1970s Hasse Walli was active in ELMU, a society established in 1978 to propagate live music in a time when disco and recorded music were worryingly diminishing the working opportunities of musicians playing live. This was also the time when Walli got more and more interested in world music. His enthusiasism for reggae started in 1977 after having seen Bob Marley performing live in Stockholm. Hasse Walli had visited a youth festival in Cuba with Punainen Lanka and Sakari Kukko, and he formed in 1979 Hasse Walli Projekti which played Cuban music and reggae rhythms.

The first eponymous solo album of Hasse Walli was released in 1981, the year when Walli was also chosen the Musician of the Year by Katso magazine. The next year, when he had his band Hasse Walli All Stars, saw the second album, called Sounds Afro! By this time Walli had seriously gotten into African music, and he dissolved the band and travelled in January 1982 to Dakar, the capital of Senegal, to explore local sounds such as Mbalax, Senegalese pop.

Jamming with local musicians at clubs, Walli practiced hard to get into the heart of this musical style quite differing from the Western genres of rock, blues and jazz he had already learned to master. Hasse Walli played with some musicians who had been performing with the legendary Youssou N'Dour. On returning to Finland and enriched by his experiences in Senegal, Walli started a band called Dakar Sound. Afro-Line was another band of Walli he started with Congolese expatriate Marie-Alphonse Liwata, releasing the albums Viva Africa (1983), Dakar Nights (1985) and Close to the Line (1987). During the years 1983–86 Hasse Walli shuttled between Gambia, Dakar and Finland.

By 1988 Walli felt he had finally learned enough to compose and arrange Mbalax music and start an all-African band for this (Walli's earlier Afro bands had mostly consisted of Finnish musicians), and he returned to Dakar for this purpose. Soon got together the new band, called Asamaan, with such musicians as Manel Diop, Yamar Thiam, Aladji Oumar Faye, Omar Cheikh Diene, Pape Sarr and Mousse Gueye. The first Asamaan album Modern Mbalax came out in 1989, receiving excellent reviews in world music circles. Walli and Asamaan played at folk music, jazz and rock festivals, doing also some street performances in Helsinki. Asamaan published two more albums, African Sky (1990) and, with a new line-up, Teranga (1993). Film director Kari Happonen documented Mbalax music scene in Dakar and Asamaan in his 1991 documentary Mbalax! Rytmin lähteillä.

Teranga marked the end of Hasse Walli's Afro period. When he returned from Senegal to Finland in June 1993, he thought the time might be now right to return to his 1960s musical roots, and the band Suuret Setelit was launched, playing rock and rhythm & blues. The gigs of Suuret Setelit were eagerly checked by a completely new generation of Hasse Walli fans. Suuret Setelit lasted until 1995, the year Walli also performed together with Remu Aaltonen, the last remaining member of the legendary 70s band Hurriganes. Hasse Walli also played several Back to the 60s type of concerts with some his peers from that period such as Danny; never forgetting his love of African music, either.

In recent years Walli has been touring with his current band Hasse Walli Power Trio. Additionally, he has worked with guitarist and singer Steve Webb, and they have released two albums together.

== Trivia ==
Hasse Walli's younger brother was Petri Walli of Kingston Wall.

== Discography ==
- Jormas: Jormas (1966, HMV)
- Blues Section: Blues Section (1968, Love Records)
- Blues Section: Some of Love (1969, Love Records)
- Piirpauke: Piirpauke (1975, Love Records)
- Piirpauke: Piirpauke 2 (1976, Love Records)
- Piirpauke: Live (1977, Love Records)
- Piirpauke: Ilahu illalla (1983, Love Records)
- Hasse Walli: Hasse Walli (1981, Kompass Records)
- Hasse Walli: Sounds Afro (1982, Kompass Records)
- Hasse Walli's Afro-Line: Viva Africa (1983, Sinetti Records)
- Hasse Walli's Afro-Line: Dakar Nights (1985, Digelius Music)
- Hasse Walli's Afro-Line: Close to the Line (1987, Digelius Music)
- Hasse Walli & Asamaan: Modern Mbalax (1989, Olarin Musiikki)
- Hasse Walli & Asamaan: African Sky (1990, Olarin Musiikki)
- Hasse Walli & Asamaan: Teranga (1993, Olarin Musiikki)
- Blues Section: Blues Section 2 (1995, Love Records)
- Piirpauke: Metamorphosis Live 1977–1995 (1995, Rockadillo)
- Hasse Walli: Kevyet Kengät (2000, HCD)
- Hasse Walli: Todellinen Live (2001, HCD)
- Hasse Walli & Steve Webb: Winners (2002, HCD)
- Hasse Walli: Live Crazy (2004, HCD)
- Hasse Walli & Steve Webb: Sweet Nina (2005, HCD)
- Piirpauke: Historia of Piirpauke Vol. 1 (2008, HCD)
- Hasse Walli & Zeus: Pop-Liisa 16 (2025, Svart Records)

== As a guest discography ==
- Hector: Kadonneet lapset
- Hector: Linnut Linnut
- Kirka: Kirka
- Vesa-Matti Loiri: 4x20
- Sakari Kukko: Kajastus
- Eero Koivistoinen: Valtakunta (1968, Otava)

Also on the releases of Sammy Babitzin, Freeman, Make Lievonen, Punainen Lanka, Juhani Aaltonen.
