= Fairyport =

Studio album by Wigwam
- Released: December 1971
- Recorded: Finnvox Studios, Helsinki; Music Network, Sweden; June 6, 1971, Hämis Club, Helsinki
- Genre: Progressive rock
- Length: 65:05
- Label: Love
- Producer: Wigwam

Wigwam chronology
Tombstone Valentine (1970)	Fairyport (1971)	Wigwam (1972)

Fairyport is a double LP by Wigwam, which was released in 1971.

== Track listing ==
=== Side A ===
1. "Losing Hold" (Gustavson, Pembroke, Pohjola) – 7:06
2. "Lost Without a Trace" (Pembroke) – 2:29
3. "Fairyport" (Gustavson) – 6:53

=== Side B ===
1. "Gray Traitors" (Gustavson) – 2:48
2. "Cafffkaff, the Country Psychologist" (Gustavson) – 5:22
3. "May Your Will Be Done, Dear Lord" (Gustavson) – 5:28
4. "How to Make It Big in Hospital" (Pembroke) – 3:03

=== Side C ===
1. "Hot Mice" (Pohjola) – 3:18
2. "P.K.'s Super Market" (Pohjola) – 2:19
3. "One More Try" (Pembroke, Pohjola) – 3:25
4. "Rockin' Ol' Galway" (Pembroke) – 2:28
5. "Every Fold" (Pembroke) – 3:06

=== Side D ===
1. "Rave-Up for the Roadies" (Live) (Gustavson, Pohjola, Tolonen, Österberg) – 17:20

=== Bonus tracks on 2003 CD version ===
1. "Losing Hold/Finlandia" (Live) (Gustavson, Pembroke, Pohjola/Sibelius) - 10:57

== Personnel ==
Wigwam

- Jukka Gustavson - vocals, piano, electric piano, organ
- Jim Pembroke - vocals & harmonica; piano (A2, C5)
- Pekka Pohjola - bass guitar, violin; acoustic guitar (C3); piano (C1, C2); celesta (C2); harpsichord (C2); backing vocals (A3)
- Ronnie Österberg - drums, percussion; backing vocals (A3)

Guest musicians:

- Unto Haapa-Aho - bass clarinet
- Eero Koivistoinen - soprano saxophone
- Tapio Louhensalo - bassoon
- Risto Pensola - clarinet
- Pekka Pöyry - soprano saxophone
- Hannu Saxelin - clarinet
- Jukka Tolonen - electric guitar (A2, B4, D)
- Ilmari Varila - oboe
