= Light Ages =

Studio album by Wigwam
- Released: 1993
- Recorded: 1993
- Studio: Finnvox Studios in Helsinki
- Genre: Pop rock
- Label: Polarvox Music Publishing Oy and Warner Music Finland Oy
- Producer: Wigwam and T. T. Oksala

Wigwam chronology
Classics (Wigwam album) (1990)	Light Ages (1993)	Highlights (Wigwam album) (1996)

Singles from Light Ages
- 1. "Borders To Be Crossed / Planetstar" Released: 1993

Light Ages is a 1993 album by the Finnish rock group Wigwam. It is their seventh studio album after a sixteen-year hiatus. Wigwam had disbanded in 1978 after the failure of the Dark Album and bankruptcy of their record label Love Records. Drummer Ronnie Osterberg died in 1980, putting an end to any hopes of the original band reforming. But other members, most notably Jim Pembroke, had remained musically active.

On the 9 June 1991 the band played at the Provinssirock festival at Seinäjoki, Finland in what was intended to be a one-off appearance. However very favourable support encouraged further live appearances and the decision to record a new album. The single Borders To Be Crossed / Planetstar (Polarvox HOPE-71) was released to promote the album. The resulting album was a combination of re-recorded versions of earlier Wigwam and Jim Pembroke songs and new material. Overall the album continued the pop-rock style of the last albums, with a polished AOR sound. The album was released in 1993 on the small Polarvox Music Publishing label, but then re-mastered on the Warner Music Finland Oy label in 2004.

== Reception ==
The album has received mixed reviews. The performances of guitarist Pekka Rechardt were highly regarded as are new keyboardist Mikko Rintanen. However the work of drummer Ronnie Osterberg is missed and replacement Jan Noponen is found to have a generic style. Of the new material Absalom is highly regarded.

== Track listing ==
No.	Title	Writer(s)	Length
1.	"Borders To Be Crossed"	Jim Pembroke	4:32
2.	"Talking Brought Me Here"	Mats Huldén, Pembroke	5:55
3.	"Hard Top Lincoln"	Pembroke	3:35
4.	"Absalom"	Pekka Rechardt, Pembroke	7:12
5.	"The Next Breakfast"	Rechardt, Pembroke	6:22
6.	"No New Games"	Pembroke	6:30
7.	"False Alarm"	Pembroke	3:52
8.	"Crystal Ball"	Rechardt, Pembroke	6:35
9.	"Skyscraper"	Rechardt, Pembroke	5:01
10.	"Tombstone Valentine"	Pembroke	3:41
11.	"Planetstar"	Pembroke	4:28
12.	"Pleasure Street"	Pembroke	5:24
13.	"Friend from the Fields"	Pembroke	4:37

== Personnel ==
Pembroke, Rechardt and Groundstroem were retained from the previous album. Keyboardist Hessu Hietanen who had returned for the recent live shows was however replaced by Mikko Rintanen. Jan Noponen was a new addition on drums. It was intended that former bassist Mats Huldén, who had been involved in mixing in the live shows, would produce the album. However, the respected and highly experienced T. T. Oksala was brought in to produce the album.

- Mosse Groundstroem – bass
- Jan Noponen – drums, percussion, tambourine (track 7).
- Jim Pembroke – vocals, piano, acoustic guitar
- Pekka Rechardt – guitar
- Mikko Rintanen – keyboards

Guest musicians

- Accordion - Hessu Hietanen (track 10).
- Backing Vocals - Maarit Hurmerinta (tracks 7, 11 and 12), Stiina Tarvonen (tracks 11, 12)
- Saxophone - Heikki Keskinen (tracks 1, 11 and 12)

Production

- Design – Kari Riipinen
- Photography By [Band] – Juha-Pekka Laakio
- Producer – T. T. Oksala, Wigwam
- Remastered By – Svante Forsbäck
