= Being (album) =

Studio album by Wigwam
- Released: February 1974
- Recorded: February–November 1973
- Genre: Progressive rock
- Length: 38:18
- Label: Love Records
- Producers: Måns Groundstroem & Wigwam

Wigwam chronology
Wigwam (1972)	Being (1974)	Live Music From The Twilight Zone (1975)

Being is a 1974 album by the Finnish progressive rock group Wigwam.

== Track listing ==
No.	Title	Writer(s)	Length
1.	"Proletarian"	Jukka Gustavson	2:10
2.	"Inspired Machine"	Gustavson	1:28
3.	"Petty-Bourgeois"	Jim Pembroke	2:58
4.	"Pride of the Biosphere"	Gustavson, Pekka Pohjola	3:17
5.	"Pedagogue"	Gustavson	9:12
6.	"Crisader"	Gustavson	4:50
7.	"Planetist"	Pohjola	3:08
8.	"Maestro Mercy"	Pembroke	2:34
9.	"Prophet"	Gustavson	6:11
10.	"Marvelry Skimmer"	Pembroke	2:32
