= The Lucky Golden Stripes and Starpose =

Lucky Golden Stripes and Starpose
- The Love Records release

Studio album by Wigwam
- Released: April 1976
- Recorded: January 1976
- Studio: The Manor (Shipton-on-Cherwell, England)
- Genre: Pop rock
- Length: 36:11
- Label: Love Records
- Producer: Ronnie Leahy

Wigwam chronology
Nuclear Nightclub (1975)	Lucky Golden Stripes and Starpose (1976)	Dark Album (1977)

Alternative cover
- International Virgin Records release

Lucky Golden Stripes and Starpose is the sixth studio album by Wigwam, released in April 1976. The album was recorded at Virgin Records’ The Manor in Oxfordshire in January 1976 with Scottish musician Ronnie Leahy in the producer's chair. The album had a double release by Love Records in Finland and Virgin internationally. The track listings were identical but the releases had different artwork.

Lucky Golden Stripes And Starpose continued the theme of the previous album, Nuclear Nightclub, in having a pop-rock style. There were, however, still prog-rock elements to the album, such as the track "Colossus". The album did not include the single "Tramdriver/Wardance", which had been released the previous year. Hopes that it would be added came to pass in 2010 when the whole album including these tracks was re-mastered and re-released on Esoteric Recordings. The album was recorded at Virgin's the Manor Studio, January 1976, except "Tramdriver" recorded at Manor Mobile and Kingsway Studio August 1975 and "Wardance" recorded at Marcus Music Studio, Stockholm November 1975.

== Artwork ==
As noted above, there were two versions of artwork. The Finnish release had artwork by former Wigwam bassist Mats Huldén. This depicted a group of US 19th century Cavalry soldiers on horses and with weapons depicting the Middle Ages. Wigwam were hoping to break into the US market and this hope is more clearly signalled on the international release. The cover design by Clive Arrowsmith shows headshots of the band within the US flag.

== Reception ==
The album has received mixed reviews. This reflects the band's continued move away from their prog-rock roots. The album was considered not as good as its predecessor, Nuclear Nightclub, and to be of varied quality, with some songs poorly arranged. Some tracks, such as the title track and "Colossus", are highly regarded.

== Track listing ==
No.	Title	Lyrics	Music	Length
1.	"Sane Again"	Pembroke	Pembroke	3:37
2.	"International Disaster"	Pembroke	Pembroke	2:41
3.	"Timedance"		Pembroke, Groundstroem, Hietanen, Rechardt, Österberg	1:07
4.	"Colossus"	Pembroke	Rechardt	6:30
5.	"Eddie And The Boys"	Pembroke	Rechardt	4:03
6.	"Lucky Golden Stripes And Starpose"	Pembroke	Rechardt	6:36
7.	"June Maybe Too Late"	Pembroke	Pembroke	3:35
8.	"Never Turn You In"	Pembroke	Pembroke, Rechardt	5:03
9.	"In A Nutshell"	Pembroke, Rechardt	Rechardt	3:47

Bonus tracks
No.	Title	Lyrics	Music	Length
10.	"Tramdriver"	Pembroke	Pembroke	3:48
11.	"Wardance"	Pembroke	Rechardt	3:43

== Personnel ==
The line-up was identical to the previous album apart from the replacement of Esa Kotilainen with Hessu Hietanen on keyboards.

- Mosse Groundstroem – bass
- Hessu Hietanen – keyboards
- Ronnie Österberg – drums, percussion
- Jim Pembroke – vocals, piano
- Pekka Rechardt – guitar
- Paavo Maijanen – backing vocals

Production

- Engineer – John Eden
- Mastered By – Ben Wiseman
- Producer – Paavo Maijanen (track 10), Ronnie Leahy (tracks 1 to 9, 11)
- Recorded By – Paavo Maijanen
- Remastered By – Pauli Saastamoinen
