= Made in Sweden (band) =

Swedish jazz-rock supergroup

Made in Sweden was a Swedish jazz-rock supergroup active from 1968 to 1977.

The founding members were Georg Wadenius (guitar), Bo Häggström (bass, piano and organ), and Tommy "Slim" Borgudd (drums) previously members of the pioneering Swedish rock group Lea Riders Group, which broke up in mid-1968.

Their first album, Made in Sweden (with Love) (1968), was a hit in Sweden and was nominated for a Grammy. They won the Swedish Grammis for Best Band in 1969 and 1970. The band was closely associated with the Stockholm music venue "Gyllene Cirkeln" and recorded a live album (Live! At the Golden Circle) there in 1970.

Singer Tommy Körberg joined the band in 1976, appearing on their last album Where Do We Begin (1976). At that point the Polish keyboard player Wlodek Gulgowski joined the band, as well as two Finns, bassist Pekka Pohjola and drummer Vesa Aaltonen, who had gained earlier reputation with Wigwam and Tasavallan Presidentti respectively.

== Discography ==
- 1968: Made in Sweden (with Love)
- 1969: Snakes in a Hole
- 1970: Live! At the Golden Circle
- 1970: Made in England
- 1970: Regnbågslandet
- 1971: Best of
- 1976: Where Do We Begin
