= Sexophone =

Sexophone may refer to:

- Musical instrument in Aldous Huxley's 1932 novel Brave New World
- Sexophone (show), a 1955 variety show produced by Curzio Malaparte
- Sexophone (synthesizer) or Dimi-S, a digital synthesizer created by Erkki Kurenniemi in 1972 where sound generation is based on the electric conductivity of the skin

== See also ==
- Saxophone
