= Finnforest =

Finnforest may refer to:

- Finnforest (company), a Finnish wood products manufacturer
- Finnforest (band), a Finnish rock band

== See also ==
- Forest Finns
