= Georg Wadenius =

Swedish musician (1945–2026)

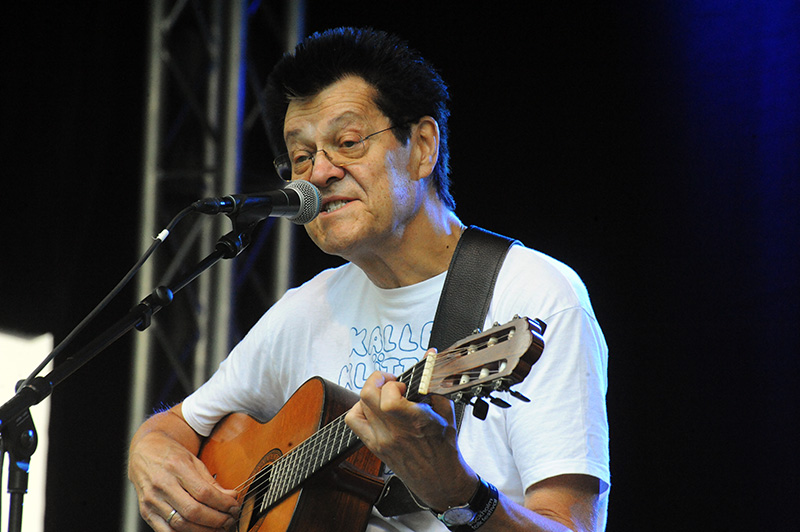
- Wadenius in 2014

Background information
- Born: 4 May 1945; Stockholm, Sweden
- Died: 30 April 2026 (age 80)
- Genres: Jazz; pop; rock
- Occupation: Musician
- Instrument: Guitar
- Label: Frituna
- Formerly of: Made in Sweden; Blood, Sweat & Tears
- Website: wadenius.com

Carl Georg Viktor "Jojje" Wadenius (4 May 1945 – 30 April 2026) was a Swedish multi-instrumentalist, singer, and composer who was particularly active during the 1970s and 1980s as a studio and session guitarist and bassist, as well as for a series of albums of children's songs in Sweden.

== Biography ==
Wadenius was born in Stockholm, Sweden, where he attended Adolf Fredrik's Music School. After appearing on a number of Swedish hit records and being founder-member of two Swedish supergroups of the early 1970s, Made in Sweden (1966–1972 and 1976) and Solar Plexus (1971–1972), he relocated to the United States to become lead guitarist of the group Blood, Sweat & Tears from 1972 to 1975. In 1979, he joined The Saturday Night Live Band on television. He stayed on until 1985 and subsequently worked as a session player and/or touring musician for many important artists, among them Steely Dan, Aretha Franklin, Diana Ross, Dr. John, David Sanborn, James Brown, Marianne Faithfull, Paul Simon, Joe Thomas, Dionne Warwick, Roberta Flack, Donald Fagen, Doug Katsaros, Michael Franks, and Luther Vandross, as well as many important artists in Sweden.

In 1970, he received a Swedish Grammis for Made in Sweden and another for his work on children's songs.

Later in his career, he produced other Scandinavian performers, including Anne Sofie von Otter, and in 2001 he set up a recording studio in Oslo, Norway.

== Discography ==
=== As leader ===
- 1969 – Goda, Goda
- 1978 – Puss, Puss, Sant, Sant
- 1978 – Georg Wadenius
- 1987 – Cleo
- 1997 – Till alla barn
- 1997 – Left turn from the right lane
- 1999 – Zzoppa
- 2005 – Interloop
- 2009 – Jul på Svenska
- 2010 – Reconnection
- 2011 – Saleya
- 2012 – Teddy og Marian
- 2013 – Jul på Norska
- 2014 – Psalmer
- 2014 – Cleo, Vol. 2
- 2016 – Cleo with friends
- 2016 – Farvel
- 2016 – Livet är nu
- 2016 – Jojjes klassiska barnvisor
- 2018 – Jojjes Wadenius bästa barnvisor, Vol. 1
- 2025 – Livet är mer än musik

With Made in Sweden

- 1968 – Made in Sweden (with Love)
- 1969 – Snakes in a Hole
- 1970 – Live! At the Golden Circle
- 1970 – Made in England
- 1970 – Regnbågslandet
- 1971 – Best of
- 1976 – Where Do We Begin

With Blood, Sweat & Tears

- 1972 – New Blood
- 1973 – No Sweat
- 1974 – Mirror Image
- 1975 – New City

=== As guest ===
- Ja, Dä Ä Dä (1969) – Pugh Rogefeldt
- Ramadan (1969) – Björn J:son Lindh
- Rune At The Top (1969) – Rune Gustafsson
- Taube (1969) – Cornelis Vreeswijk
- Poem, Blues Och Ballader (1969) – Cornelis Vreeswijk
- När Dimman Lättar (1969) – Berndt Staf
- Jason's Fleece (1970) – Björn J:son Lindh
- Solar Plexus (1971) – Solar Plexus
- Monica, Monica (1971) – Monica Zetterlund
- Huvva (1971) – Merit Hemmingson
- Goda, Goda (DK) (1971) – Trille
- Black Is The Color (1972) – Joe Henderson
- Songs (1973) – B.J. Thomas
- Funky Formula (1976) – Slim Borgudd
- The Poet (1976) – Olli Ahvenlahti
- E.K. (1976) – Eero Koivistoinen
- Move (1977) – Rune Gustafsson
- Sansara Music Band (1977) – Sansara
- It's A Long Story (1977) – Brian Chapman
- Nyspolat (1977) – Coste Apetrea
- The Mathematician's Air Display (1977) – Pekka Pohjola
- Hoven, Droven (1977) – Merit Hemmingson
- Spelar Nilsson (1978) – De Gladas Kapell
- Live & More (1980) – Roberta Flack and Peabo Bryson
- Dreams (1980) – Grace Slick
- Never Too Much (1981) – Luther Vandross
- Forever, for Always, for Love (1982) – Luther Vandross
- Busy Body (1983) – Luther Vandross
- Get It Right (1983) – Aretha Franklin
- Born To Love (1983) – Peabo Bryson and Roberta Flack
- Success (1983) – The Weather Girls
- Live From New York (1984) – The Saturday Night Live Band
- How Many Times Can We Say Goodbye (1984) – Dionne Warwick and Luther Vandross
- Swept Away (1985) – Diana Ross
- Passion Fruit (1985) – Ronnie Cuber
- The Night I Fell In Love (1985) – Luther Vandross
- Gloria Loring (1986) – Gloria Loring
- The Camera Never Lies (1987) – Michael Franks
- Distant Drums (1987) – Brian Slawson
- Family Vacation (1987) – Rosenshontz
- Energia (1989) – Valerie Lynch
- Collection (1989) – New York Voices
- Johnny Gill (1990) – Johnny Gill
- So Intense (1991) – Lisa Fischer
- Hearts Of Fire (1991) – New York Voices
- That Time Again (1991) – Kevin Owens
- Jigsaw (1991) – Jeremy Steig
- Only Human (1991) – Jeffrey Osborne
- Make Time for Love (1991) – Keith Washington
- Time for Love (1991) – Freddie Jackson
- Kamakiriad (1993) – Donald Fagen
- Scene Is Clean (1993) – Ronnie Cuber
- Paul Jabara Friends (1993) – Paul Jabara
- Television (1994) – Dr. John
- Pure Pleasure (1994) – Phil Perry
- Alive in America (1995) – Steely Dan
- Gravity!!! (1996) – Howard Johnson
- Mr. X (1996) – Jason Miles
- All That I Am (1997) – Joe Thomas
- Endless Is Love (1997) – Jon Lucien
- Bortom Det Blå (1997) – Lisa Ekdahl
- Show Me The Meaning Of Being Lonely (1999) – Backstreet Boys
- Julemorgen (1999) – Nissa Nyberget
- Port Of Call (2000) – Silje Nergaard
- Djävulen Och Ängeln (2000) – Tomas Ledin
- Soul Ballads (2001) – Sigvart Dagsland
- At First Light (2001) – Silje Nergaard
- Vapen & ammunition (2002) – Kent
- Visor (2002) – Helen Sjöholm
- Nightwatch (2003) – Silje Nergaard
- Irreplaceable (2003) – George Benson
- Life (2003) – Leif Johansen
- Taube (2003) – Per Myrberg
- Når Dagen Roper (2004) – Anne Grete Preus
- Det Føles Bra (2005) – Jan Eggum
- Be Still My Heart - The Essential (2005) – Silje Nergaard
- Här Är Den sköna sommaren (2006) – Lill Lindfors
- No Vil Eg Vake Med Deg (2006) – Hilde Louise Asbjørnsen
- I Let The Music Speak (2006) – Anne-Sofie von Otter
- In The Moment (2007) – Jazzcode
- Hjerteknuser (2007) – Jan Eggum
