= Frank Robson =

English-born Finnish musician (1946–2024)

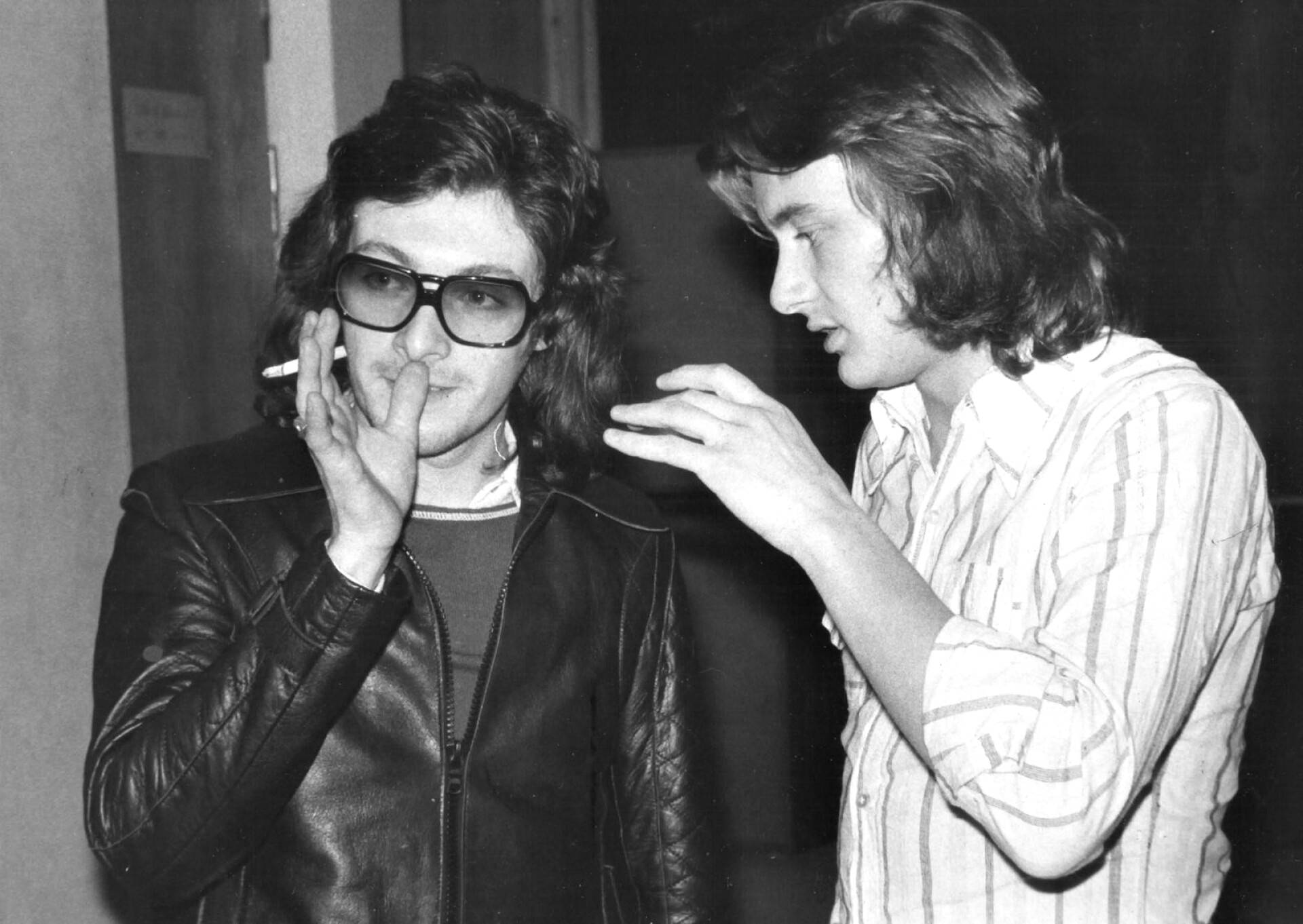
Robson (right) preparing the Finnish vocalist Kirka for recording in 1972

Frank Robson (27 April 1946 – 16 November 2024) was an English-born rock musician who achieved fame in Finland. He was known as a singer, pianist and organ player. He first travelled to Finland in 1967.

== Life and career ==
Robson was born in Bradford on Avon on 27 April 1946. He had met some Finns in a London pub, and someone had given him their phone number. When Robson's band subsequently was on tour in Scandinavia, he found himself in Stockholm and called the Finnish number. At that time, there was a demand for rock musicians in Finland who had English as their native language, especially for someone with experience from the music circles in London; it is said that in London, Robson had played with the Small Faces.

In Finland, Robson joined Mosaic, as their lead singer following Kirill Babitzin's departure to pursue a solo career. Mosaic made a single, both songs on which were penned by Robson. Next Robson was asked to join Blues Section to fill in for Jim Pembroke. In 1968, Robson made a single with the band and they played 50 gigs before breaking up and Robson returned to England. He soon returned to Finland, and joined the Tasavallan Presidentti for their first two albums before getting fired. Robson joined the reformed band in 1999, sharing writing credits on the 2006 album Six Complete with Jukka Tolonen.

Robson released five solo albums. In 2013 he was diagnosed with cancer of the pharynx. After a number of operations, his voice was reduced, but he remained hopeful, saying that "it's somewhere between Joe Cocker and Louis Armstrong." His first two albums, Robson and Stay Awhile were re-released by the Finnish record company Svart Records. The same company also put out a collection of Robson's early singles with a total of 14 songs, and in 2023 released The Lost 1971 Studio Session, Robson's last recorded session with Tasavallan Presidentti before his dismissal from the band.

Robson had two daughters. One of them, Jenny Robson, is also a singer. He died in Lahti, Finland on 16 November 2024, at the age of 78.

== Solo albums ==
- Robson (1974)
- Stay Awhile (1976)
- I Painted a Picture (1986)
- Sings Mick Hanian (1987)
- Back in Business (1998)
