= Wigwam (Finnish band) =

Finnish rock band

- Origin: Finland
- Genres: Progressive rock
- Years active: 1968–2018
- Members: Jukka Gustavson; Pekka "Rekku" Rechardt; Jan Noponen
- Past members: Jim Pembroke; Pave Maijanen; Esa Kotilainen; Pedro Hietanen; Pekka Pohjola

Wigwam was a Finnish progressive rock band formed in 1968.

== History ==
Wigwam was founded after the split of the seminal Blues Section, with whom drummer Ronnie Österberg had played before. He formed the band as a trio, but soon brought in British expatriate singer/songwriter Jim Pembroke (also in Blues Section) and organist Jukka Gustavson. A year later, Pekka Pohjola joined on bass. Kim Fowley produced Wigwam's second album Tombstone Valentine (1970). This album also featured an excerpt of Erkki Kurenniemi's electronic composition 'Dance of the Anthropoids'. The 1974 album Being is often called Wigwam's masterpiece. After its release, though, Pohjola and Gustavson quit the band. Commercially the most successful Wigwam album must be the more pop-oriented Nuclear Nightclub that followed in 1975, with new members Pekka Rechardt on guitar and Måns Groundstroem on bass. The album was recorded in Stockholm with better studios, and featured Esa Kotilainen, the Finnish equivalent of Rick Wakeman, on synthesizer. The effect of the synthesizer was to steer the group away from the organ and piano sound of Gustavson that dominated previous albums. The band from Nuclear Nightclub on had songwriters Pembroke and Rechardt often working together, and the two came to describe the style as "deep pop" instead of progressive rock.

For a time in the 1970s Wigwam seemed poised to break through in Europe, along with bands like Tasavallan Presidentti, but even though they were highly praised by the UK press large-scale international fame eluded them, and by 1978 they had disbanded. Jim Pembroke and Ronnie Österberg formed the Jim Pembroke Band in late 1979, but following health problems with diabetes, Österberg committed suicide on 6 December 1980.

Wigwam reformed in the 1990s with the Pembroke-Rechardt-Groundstroem core intact, and has been active to the present. In Finland they have a lasting (although limited) following, and their influence on Finnish rock music is widely recognised.

In the 2010s, the former members of Wigwam have made concerts billed as Wigwam Unplugged or Wigwam Revisited. The latest line-up consists Mikko Rintanen, Jan Noponen, Måns Groundstroem and Jukka Gustavson with Pekka Nylund playing guitar.

In late 2018, the band made a short 50th anniversary tour in Finland with line-up of Jukka Gustavson, Jim Pembroke, Pekka Rechardt, Esa Kotilainen and Jan Noponen with Pave Maijanen on bass.

Band leader Jim Pembroke died in October 2021, aged 75. As other members of the band have decided not to perform under the name Wigwam without Pembroke the 2018 concerts will remain their final performances. However Gustavson, Rechardt, Kotilainen and Noponen with bassist Janne Brunberg have since performed under the name Wigwam Experience and Gustavson, Noponen, Mikko Rintanen, Brunberg and guitarist Puka Oinonen under the name Wigwam Revisited.

== Band members ==
=== Latest lineup ===
- Jim Pembroke – vocals, keyboards (1969–2018; died 2021)
- Jukka Gustavson – vocals, electric organ (1969–1974, 2018)
- Pekka "Rekku" Rechardt – guitar (1974-)
- Jan Noponen – drums (1991–1993, 2018)
- Esa Kotilainen – keyboards (1974–75, 1977, 2001-2018, died 2023)
- Pave Maijanen – bass guitar, vocals (2018; died 2021)

=== Drums ===
- Ronald "Ronnie" Österberg (1968–1980; died 1980)
- Jari "Kepa" Kettunen (1993–2006)

=== Guitar ===
- Vladimir "Nikke" Nikamo (1968–1970)

=== Bass guitar ===
- Mats Huldén (1968–70, 2004–2006)
- Pekka Pohjola (1970–1974; died 2008)
- Måns "Måsse" Groundstroem (1974–2003)
- Jussi Kinnunen (2003–2004)

=== Violin ===
- Pekka Pohjola (1970–1974; died 2008)

=== Keyboards ===
- Heikki "Pedro" (or "Hessu") Hietanen (1975–1977, 1991–1992, 1999–2000; died 2023)
- Mikko Rintanen (1992–1993)

=== Guest musicians ===
- Jukka Tolonen, guitar (1970–1972), bass (2018)
- Esa Kotilainen, keyboards (1974–1975, 1977)
- Kristian (Bengt Huhta), vocals (1968)
- Ilpo Aaltio, saxophone (1968)
- Ilmari Varila, oboe
- Tapio Louhensalo, bassoon
- Hannu Saxelin, clarinet
- Risto Pensola, clarinet
- Unto Haapa-aho, bass clarinet
- Eero Koivistoinen, soprano saxophone
- Pekka Pöyry, soprano saxophone
- Pentti Lasanen, clarinet, flute
- Paavo Honkanen, clarinet
- Aale Lindgren, oboe
- Juhani Tapaninen, bassoon
- Juhani Aaltonen, flute
- Seppo Paakkunainen, flute
- Erik Dannholm, flute
- Pentti Lahti, flute
- Kari Veisterä, flute
- Taisto Wesslin, acoustic guitar
- Erkki Kurenniemi, VCS3 synthesizer
- Jukka Ruohomäki, VCS3 programming assistant
- Heikki Laurila, guitar, banjo
- Kalevi Nyqvist, accordion
- Pedro Hietanen, keyboards (2018)
- Mikko Rintanen, keyboards, vocals (2018)
- Kepa Kettunen, drums (2018)

== Discography ==
=== Albums ===
- Hard 'n' Horny (1969)
- Tombstone Valentine (1970)
- Fairyport (1971)
- Being (1974)
- Nuclear Nightclub (1975)
- The Lucky Golden Stripes and Starpose (1976)
- Dark Album (1977)
- Light Ages (1993)
- Titans Wheel (2002)
- Some Several Moons (2005)

Year	Album	Peak positions	Notes
Year	Album	FIN	Notes
1975	Nuclear Nightclub	1	
2002	Titans Wheel	7	
2005	Some Several Moons	28	
2011	Nuclear Nightclub	24	Re-release of 1975 album
2014	Fairyport	40	Re-release of 1971 album
2014	Tombstone Valentine	42	Re-release of 1970 album
2014	Being	30	

=== Compilations and live albums ===
- Wigwam (1972)
- Live Music from the Twilight Zone (1975)
- Rumours on the Rebound (1979)
- Classics – The Rarest (1990)
- Highlights (1996)

Year	Album	Peak positions
Year	Album	FIN
2000	Fresh Garbage – Rarities from 1969–1977	34
2001	Wigwam Plays Wigwam – Live	46
2016	Pop-Liisa 3	20
2026	Live in Denmark 1976	14

=== Jim Pembroke (& Wigwam) ===
These are Jim Pembroke's solo albums, which are played by Wigwam

- Hot Thumbs O'Riley: Wicked Ivory (1972)
- Jim Pembroke & Wigwam: Pigworm (1974)
- Jim Pembroke: Corporal Cauliflowers Mental Function (1977)
