= Maarit =

Maarit is a Finnish female given name equivalent to Margaret. It may refer to:

- Maarit Hurmerinta (born 1953), Finnish singer known by her mononym Maarit
- Maarit Lalli (born 1964), Finnish film director, film producer and screenwriter
- Maarit Toivanen (born 1954), Finnish business executive

== See also ==
- Marit
