= Blues Section =

Finnish rock band

Blues Section are a Finnish rock music group. They started in 1967, formed around the vocalist Jim Pembroke, a British expatriate songwriter now living in Finland. The other members of the band were Eero Koivistoinen (saxophone), Ronnie Österberg (drums), Hasse Walli (guitar), and Måns Groundstroem (bass). Their influences came above all from John Mayall's Bluesbreakers and Jimi Hendrix, who had played a gig in Helsinki in May 1967. One can also hear in Pembroke's British-flavoured song-writing some echoes from The Beatles and The Kinks. Blues Section released a self-titled album late 1967 on Helsinki's Love Records. In 1968 Groundstroem and Pembroke left the band, being replaced by Pekka Sarmanto and (another British vocalist) Frank Robson, respectively. Also Koivistoinen would leave the band during the same year, and by the end of 1968 Blues Section was over. The Blues Section members would continue in such acclaimed progressive rock bands as Wigwam and Tasavallan Presidentti. Eero Koivistoinen was to become an internationally acclaimed jazz musician, and Hasse Walli would discover world music, playing in such bands as Piirpauke.

== Singles discography ==
- Blues Section & Jim Pembroke: Call Me On Your Telephone / Only Dreaming (7", 1967)
- Blues Section & Jim Pembroke: Hey, Hey, Hey / Shivers Of Pleasure (7", 1967)
- Kirka Babitzin & Blues Section: Anna suukko vain / Silloin ihminen kaunein on (7", 1967)
- Kirka Babitzin: Avaruuslaulu / Otto Donner: Riemun siemenet - Tanssi - Kampaamon riemu (1968)
- Jim Pembroke & Blues Section: Semi-Circle Solitude / Cherry Cup-Cake Twist (7", 1968)
- Blues Section & Frank Robson: Faye / Sun Of Love (7" 1968)
- Ronnie Österberg & Blues Section: Kauan kuljen / Hei vaan (7", 1968)
- Ronnie Österberg & Blues Section: Ei kauempaa / Kun yö hyväilee (7", 1968)
- Otto Donner & Blues Section: Pääskytorni / Kuka kertoisi minulle (7", 1968)

== Album discography ==
- Blues Section (1967)
- Some Of Love (compilation, 1969)
- Once More For The Road (1980) (compilation, 1980)
- Classics - The Ultimate Collection (compilation, 1990)
- Blues Section 2 (compilation, 1995)

== Appearances on compilation albums discography ==
- Football (on "Perspectives '68 - Music In Finland", LP, 1968)
- For Mods Only - Lucy Jane (on "Reunion", LP, 1970)
