= Erkki Kurenniemi =

Finnish designer, philosopher and artist (1941–2017)

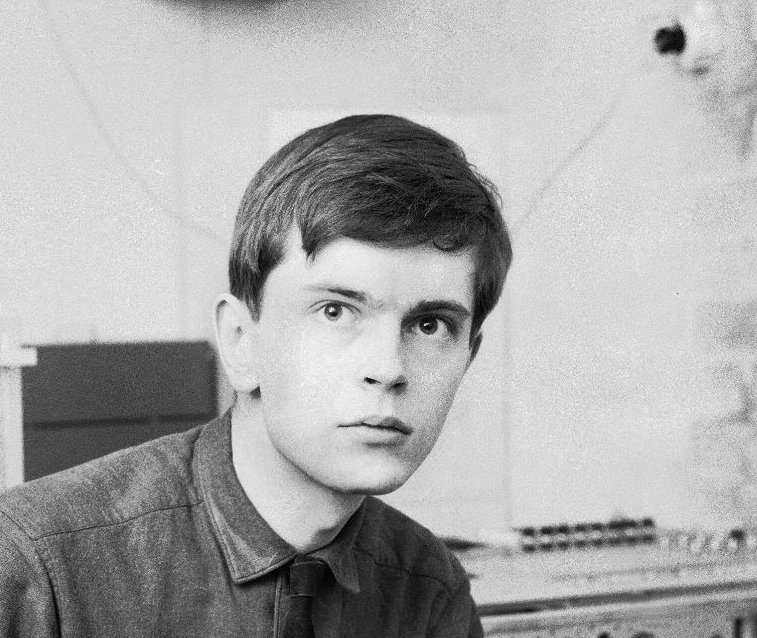
Young Kurenniemi in 1965

Erkki Juhani Kurenniemi (10 July 1941, Hämeenlinna, Finland – 1 May 2017, Helsinki) was a Finnish designer, philosopher and artist, best known for his electronic music compositions and the electronic instruments he has designed. He is considered to have been one of the leading early pioneers of electronic music in Finland. Kurenniemi was also a science populariser, a futurologist, a pioneer of media culture, and an experimental film-maker.

Kurenniemi completed the majority of his instruments, electronic compositions and experimental films in the 1960s and 1970s. Between 1962 and 1974, he designed and constructed ten electronic instruments and studio devices when he was working as a volunteer assistant at the Department of Musicology at the University of Helsinki, and as designer at Digelius Electronics Finland Oy, founded in 1970. In addition to the Musicology Department, Kurenniemi also worked as assistant and senior designer at the Department of Theoretical Physics from 1962 to 1973. Kurenniemi earned a Bachelor of Science degree in 1968.

He subsequently worked as a designer of control systems for industrial robots at Oy W. Rosenlew Ab (1976–78), and as a designer of industrial automation and robotic systems at Nokia’s cable machinery division (1980–86). He also worked as a specialist consultant and Head of Planning at the Science Centre Heureka in Vantaa, Finland (1987–98).

Kurenniemi received the Finland Prize of the Ministry of Education and Culture in 2003. In 2004, he was elected honorary fellow of the University of Art and Design Helsinki. In 2011 Kurenniemi received the Order of the Lion of Finland medal from the President of Finland Mrs. Tarja Halonen.

== Instrument design ==
Kurenniemi began his career in instrument design at the Department of Musicology in the University of Helsinki during the academic year 1961–1962. At the suggestion of musicology students Erkki Salmenhaara, Ilkka Oramo and Ilpo Saunio, Professor Erik Tawaststjerna invited Kurenniemi to design an electronic music studio for the university. Kurenniemi was also employed by the department as an unpaid voluntary assistant.

Kurenniemi's concept for the studio represented a departure from the then prevalent tape editing studios in that it employed digital control technology and automation. The key unit for control, production and editing in 1964–1967 was the so-called integrated synthesizer, the design of which bore a closer resemblance to the 1950s' digital RCA synthesizer than to the voltage-controlled synthesizers of Robert Moog, for instance. In parallel with his work on designing the studio, Kurenniemi also built electronic instruments for customers, including avant-garde artist M. A. Numminen, composer Osmo Lindeman and Swedish composer Ralph Lundsten. Kurenniemi worked on a series of DIMI synthesizers (from DIgital Music Instrument). In 1970, a company called Digelius Electronics Finland Oy was set up to manufacture DIMIs.

Kurenniemi's instruments were characterised by the early use of digital control and also the combination of sequencers with synthesizers. Kurenniemi was also the first to use a completely digital design based on calculator circuits to determine the pitch of the synthesised sound. Kurenniemi also explored the use of digital memory in his instruments – his first digital memory was installed in the Dico instrument commissioned by Osmo Lindeman (1969).

In addition to developing new applications, Kurenniemi studied the use of different control systems in his instruments. For instance, Dimi-O (1971) is based on an optical interface, the original purpose of which was to read sheet music graphically. The instrument could also be played with a conventional keyboard or via a video camera. Dimi-O was also used in tandem with a dancer, whose movements were transformed into music (see Section 2.2 Film, media and video works).

Dimi-O is an early example of an interactive instrument. Inspired by the bio-music of the American composer Manford L. Eaton, Kurenniemi designed instruments based on bio-feedback. These included Dimi-S (also known as Sexophone, 1972), where sound generation is based on the electric conductivity of the skin, and Dimi-T (a.k.a. Electroencephalophone, 1973), where the sound control is based on a signal generated by the electric activity of the brain.

Having worked for years in other fields, Kurenniemi resumed the construction of digital instruments in the mid-2000s (decade), when his pioneering work was attracting increasing interest internationally. Together with Thomas Carlsson, a UK-based designer of electronic systems, in 2005, Kurenniemi designed and constructed a new version of the Dimi instrument in which sound generation is based on the theory of mathematical harmonies developed by Kurenniemi since the 1980s (see Section 3. Scientific activity). Dimi-H is a program-based instrument that allows the player to pick out "notes out of the air" in a camera-generated 3D space.

== Artistic activity ==
=== Music ===
The most well-known part of Kurenniemi's music production is his electroacoustic compositions, which he realized in the Electronic music studio of the University of Helsinki. Beside his own work, he acted as an assistant to other composers - e.g. Erkki Salmenhaara - and produced material tapes for composers.

The well-known compositions of Kurenniemi include pieces such as "On-Off" (1963) and "Andropodien Tanssi" (1968) which was partly released on an album of Finnish progressive psychedelic band Wigwam under the title "Dance of the Anthropoids" (Wigwam: Tombstone Valentine, 1970).

Part of Kurenniemi's compositions are realized in a collaboration - e.g. "Saharan Uni I & II" (1967) with Kari Hakala and "Inventio/Outventio" (1970) and "Mix Master Universe" (1973) with Jukka Ruohomäki. Many of the Kurenniemi's pieces are first realized as an equipment testing - e.g. "Andropoidien Tanssi" (with Andromatic), "Improvisaatio" (with DICO) and "Inventio/Outventio" (with DIMI-A). In 2002 Mika Taanila put together a compilation-CD (Äänityksiä/Recordings 1963-73) of Kurenniemi's electroacoustic compositions.

=== Film, media and video works ===
Kurenniemi's films comprise 14 experimental 16-mm short films on the themes of nature, the living environment, as well as travelogues, sex and technology. The films were shot in 1964–1971, but their exact completion dates are difficult to determine, as Kurenniemi only showed his work to a few friends at his home. Only one film, Ex nihilo, was presented publicly at the time of its completion, and has therefore been assessed by the Finnish Board of Film Classification.

All the others remain, according to Kurenniemi, more or less incomplete sketches. All the films were originally silent, but in 2003 Kurenniemi and Mika Taanila added soundtracks of Kurenniemi's contemporaneous electronic music to six of them. The dates in the filmography are Kurenniemi's estimates of when the editing of the film was finished.

From 1972 to 1974, Kurenniemi recorded diary entries on tape cassettes. From the early 1980s onward he kept a constant video and photograph log of his surroundings and personal events, with the aim of producing material for a digital virtual world, to be compiled some time after his death, in which his life would be the central element.

=== Kurenniemi archives and works in exhibitions ===
All of Kurenniemi's films and the Dimi-S instrument as well as Master Chaynjis, an early robot from 1982, are today in the collections of the Finnish National Gallery (FNG), the Museum of Contemporary Art Kiasma. His extensive private archive is deposited in the Central Art Archives of the FNG, where it is being catalogued and digitised. Some of Kurenniemi's instruments (integrated synthesizer, Sähkökvartetti, Dico, Dimi-A, Dimix and Dimi-6000) are deposited in the studio of the Musicology Department at the University of Helsinki, and some (Andormatic, Dimi-O and another Dimi-S) are in Ralph Lundsten's music studio Andromeda in Stockholm. Another Dimi-A synthesizer is deposited in the Museum of Music in Stockholm.

The Documenta (13) art exhibition in Kassel presented a colorful overview of Kurenniemi's archives and artworks in 2012. Parts of these private and public archives and artist projects were shown also in a solo show at Kiasma Museum of Contemporary Art in Helsinki from 2013 to 2014.

=== Scientific activity ===
Kurenniemi presented his theory of mathematical music in the article "Harmonioiden teoria" ("Theory of harmonies", 1985) and "Musical harmonies are divisor sets" (1988), in which he defines harmony as a function of the divisor set of an integer. Harmony can be read by interpreting the successive numbers as intervals. Harmonies are symmetrical, that is, their interval relations remain constant regardless of whether the divisor set is read from beginning to end or vice versa. Correspondingly, all intervals and chords can be expanded into a harmony by calculating the greatest common factor of the set, f, and its smallest common divisor, s, resulting in the harmony as H(s/f). In Kurenniemi's theory, both major and minor chords generate the same harmony, which in his view would explain their equal status in Western tonal music.

His theory of harmonies abandons traditional scales and octave equivalence, elevating harmonies to the status of natural scales. Kurenniemi also assumes that rhythm follows the same proportions, only below the hearing threshold. Around the start of the 1990s, he wrote yet as unpublished articles concerning a theoretical concept on trivalent networks which he called the Graph Field Theory on space, time and matter.

== Bibliography ==
- 1963a. "Elektronisen musiikin studiolaitteiston systematiikkaa". Teekkari 1B/1963.
- 1963b. "Kokeita analogialaskimella". Teekkari 3–4B/1963.
- 1971a. "Elektronisen musiikin instrumenteista". Musiikki 1/1971.
- 1971b. "Message is Massage". Taide 6/1971.
- 1972–73. "Mitä tiedät tietokonemusiikista". Rondo 8/1972 – 3/1973.
- 1978. "Musiikki ja tekoäly". Tritonus 4/1978.
- 1979. "Mikroprosessorit teollisuusrobottien ohjauksessa". Sähkö 5–6/1979.
- 1980. "Uusi tekniikka säästää luonnonvaroja". Suomen Luonto 6–7/1980.
- 1985. "Harmonioiden teoria". Musiikki 3–4/1985.
- 1988. "Musical Harmonies are Divisor Sets". Teoksessa M. Karjalainen, T. Lahti, J. Linjama (toim.): Proceedings of Nordic Acoustical Meeting 88. Tampere 1988.
- 1999. Askeleen edellä: "Todellisuus on aina askeleen edellä mielikuvitusta" : artikkeleita 1979 - 1999 (from the series Kysymysmerkki). Kiasma Museum of Contemporary Art, Helsinki.
- 2004. "Oh, human fart". Framework: The Finnish Art Review 2/2004. FRAME Finnish Fund for Art Exchange, Helsinki.
- 2011. Erkki Kurenniemi (from the series 100 Notes – 100 Thoughts, dOCUMENTA 13). Hatje Cantz Verlag, Kassel 2011
- 2015. Writing and Unwriting (Media) Art History - Erkki Kurenniemi in 2048. MIT Press 2015. Edited by Joasia Krysa and Jussi Parikka.

== Discography ==
- Various performers: Perspective '68 – Music in Finland. © 1968 Love Records LRLP 4.
- Wigwam: Tombstone Valentine. © 1970 Love Records LRLP 19.
- Dimi 1: Dimi is born. © 1970 Musica, DDS-1.
- Various performers: Love Proge 2. © 1998 Love Records LXCD 621.
- Various performers: Arktinen hysteria – Suomi-avantgarden esipuutarhureita. © 2001 Love Records LXCD 635.
- Various performers: On/Off – From Ether Sounds To Electronic Music. © 2002 Kiasma Records NYK-001.
- Erkki Kurenniemi: Äänityksiä / Recordings 1963–1973. © 2002 Love Records LXCD 637.
- Various performers: Avantometric Attachments 2002. © 2002 Mediataideyhdistys Avanto ry AAAAA-2002.
- Various performers: An Anthology of Noise & Electronic Music: Third A-Chronology, Vol. 3, 1952–2004. © 2004 Sub Rosa [220].
- Erkki Kurenniemi & Circle: Rakkaus tulessa. © 2011 Full Contact / Ektro Records KRYPT-014.
- Erkki Kurenniemi: DRY ’73-9-8. © 2011 Ruton Music RUT-003.
- Erkki Kurenniemi: Rules. © 2012 Full Contact / Ektro Records KRYPT-022.
- Claes Andersson, Kalevi Seilonen, Erkki Kurenniemi, Otto Donner: Sähkö-shokki-ilta. © 2013 Ektro Rocords ectro-099.

== Filmography ==
- Carnaby Street (c. 1971, 4:07, colour)
- Computer Music (c. 1966, 6:29 B/W)
- Electronics In The World of Tomorrow (c. 1964, 4:56, colour & B/W)
- Elämän reikänauha (The Punched Tape of Life, 1967, 8:03, B/W)
- Ex nihilo (1968, 12:47)
- Firenze (c. 1970, 9:15, colour)
- Flora & Fauna (c. 1965, 5:59, colour)
- Joulumysteeri (Christmas Mystery, 1969, 5:50, B/W)
- Huumaava elämänlanka (The Intoxicating Thread of Life, c. 1968, 7:04, colour)
- Sex Show 1 & 2 (c. 1969, 5:10, colour)
- Talo (House, 1969, 2:44, B/W)
- Tavoiteltu kaunotar (Coveted Beauty, 1965, 4:15, B/W)
- Tuli ja vesi (Fire and Water, c. 1968, 10:55, colour)
- Winterreise (c. 1964, 9:53. colour & B/W)

== Instruments ==
- Integrated synthesizer (for the Department of Musicology at the University of Helsinki) (1964–)
- Sähkökvartetti (Electric Quartet, for M. A. Numminen) (1967–1968)
- Andromatic (for composers Ralph Lundsten and Leo Nilsson) (1968)
- Dico (for composer Osmo Lindeman) (1969)
- DIMI-A (1970)
- DIMI-O (1971)
- DIMI-S (1972)
- DIMIX (1972)
- DIMI-T (1973)
- DIMI-6000 (1973–1974)
- DIMI-H (2005–2006, together with Thomas Carlsson)

== Compositions ==
- "On-Off" (1963)
- "Ein-Aus" (1964) (abridged version of "On-Off")
- "Saharan Uni I-II" ("Saharan Dream I–II", 1967; in cooperation with Kari Hakala)
- "Antropoidien tanssi" ("Dance of the Anthropoids", 1968)
- "Hana" ("The Faucet", 1969)
- "Improvisaatio" ("Improvisation", 1969)
- "Preludi" ("Prelude", 1970)
- "Virsi" ("Hymn", 1970)
- "Inventio-Outventio" ("Invention" 1970; an adaptation of J.S. Bach’s a minor invention (BWV 784) by Kurenniemi; "Outvention" by Kurenniemi together with Jukka Ruohomäki)
- "?Death" (three different versions 1972-75)
- "Mix Master Universe" (1973; together with Jukka Ruohomäki)
- "Slice" (197?)
- "Suru" ("Grief", 1980)

== Sources ==
- Taanila, M. 2002. Äänityksiä / Recordings 1963–1973. [CD liner notes.] Helsinki: Love Records.
