= Verneri Pohjola =

Finnish jazz trumpeter (born 1977)

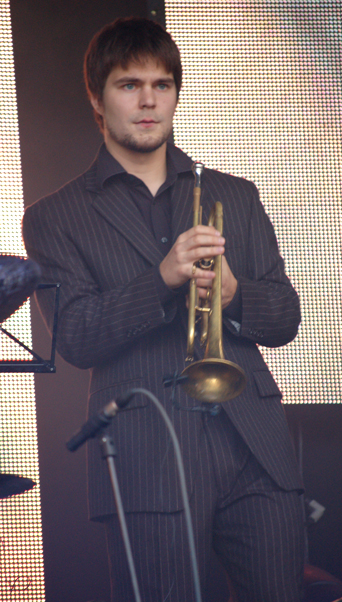

Background information
- Born: 23 December 1977 (age 48); Helsinki
- Origin: Finland
- Occupation: Musician
- Instrument: Trumpet
- Labels: ACT Music, Edition Records, TUM Records

Juho Verneri Pohjola (born 23 December 1977 in Helsinki, Finland) is a Finnish jazz trumpeter and composer.

== Biography ==
The son of bassist Pekka Pohjola, Pohjola studied at the Jazz and Pop Conservatory in Helsinki and the Örebro Music School. From 1999 he studied jazz music at the Sibelius Academy, where he met pianist Tuomo Prättälä, bassist Antti Lötjönen, and drummer Olavi Louhivuori, members of his Ilmiliekki Quartet in 2002. In 2003 they released their debut album March of the Alpha Males, followed by Take It With Me in 2006 .

In addition, Pohjola is a member of the band Quintessence, the band of Iro Haarla, the ensemble Suhkan Uhka of Antti Hytti and Jone Takamäki, the UMO Jazz Orchestra, and the post-rock band Silvio, where he plays the drums. With his brother Ilmari, he played with his father Pekka Pohjola for the first time on his album Views (2001) . His first solo album Aurora was first released 2009 by the Finnish independent label Texicalli Records and came out for the German label ACT Music 2011. The only non-original composition of the eight tracks is Joaquín Rodrigo's Concierto de Aranjuez Amour.

The artist has been cited that his music is “about embracing life in all of its complex emotions, while we still have it. After all, the dead don’t dream.” The final phrase makes also the title of his 2020 solo album. The sidemen for this seven tracks comprising CD and vinyl disc release at Edition Records have been: Antti Lötjönen bass, Mika Kallio drums, Miikka Paatelainen pedal steel guitar, Tuomo Prättälä piano and electronics and Pauli Lyytinen soprano and tenor saxophone. The JazzTimes reviewer commented about Pohjola: "he plays ideas you haven’t heard before".

On Pohjola's initiative, Kaija Saariaho composed her last work, the Trumpet Concerto Hush, and he premièred it in 2023 with the Finnish Radio Symphony Orchestra.

== Honors ==
His quartet was awarded the Teosto-Preis of the Association of Finnish Composers, and Pohjola was voted Artist of the Year at the Pori Jazz festival In 2004, the quartet was invited to the official reception by the Finnish president Tarja Halonen on the occasion of the Finnish Independence Day. In 2009 for his album Aurora, Pohjola received a Finnish jazz Emma Award as the ″Jazz Album of the Year".

== Discography ==
=== Solo albums ===
- 2009: Aurora (ACT), with Juhani Aaltonen, Pepa Päivinen, Ilmari Pohjola, Aki Rissanen, Antti Lötjönen, Pekka Pohjola, Joonas Riippa, Meta4 String Quartet
- 2011: Ancient History (ACT)
- 2011: Music For The Play Mr Vertigo (KHY Suomen Musiikki Oy), with Joonas Riippa and Aki Rissanen
- 2013: Rubidium (TUM Records), with Black Motor
- 2014: Bullhorn (Edition EDN1056)
- 2017: Pekka (Edition)
- 2018: Animal Image (Edition), with Mika Kallio
- 2020: The Dead Don't Dream (Edition)
- 2023: Monkey Mind (Edition)

=== Collaborations ===
With Quintessence

- 2002: Talk Less Listen More (Texicalli Records)
- 2005: 5 am (Jupiter)

With Suhkan Uhka

- 2003: Suhka (TUM Records)

With Ilmiliekki Quartet

- 2003: March Of The Alpha Males (TUM Records)
- 2006: Take It With Me (TUM Records)
- 2009: Vi Sålde Våra Hemman (KHY Suomen Musiikki Oy), with Emma Salokoski
- 2019: Land Of Real Men (We Jazz Records)

With Silvio

- 2005: Amass All You Can (New Music Community)

With Jupiter Horns

- 2007: Street Poetry (WolfGang Records), with Hanoi Rocks

With Orrenmaa Band

- 2009: Make My Day (TO Records, Nordic Notes), with Billy Cobham & Tower Of Power Horns

With Nils Landgren, Michael Wollny, Leszek Możdżer, Nguyên Lê, Lars Danielsson, Wolfgang Haffner, Cæcilie Norby, Céline Bonacina

- 2012: The ACT Jubilee Concert (ACT)

With Adam Bałdych & The Baltic Gang

- 2012: Imaginary Room (ACT)

With Flora Et Labora

- 2012: Flora Et Labora (Konnex Records)

With Iro Haarla Sextet

- 2013: Kolibri (TUM Records)

With Flame Jazz Messengers

- 2016: Port Arthur (Fredriksson Music)

As a Guest:

- 2023 "Flow" w/Slowly Rolling Camera
