= Marit =

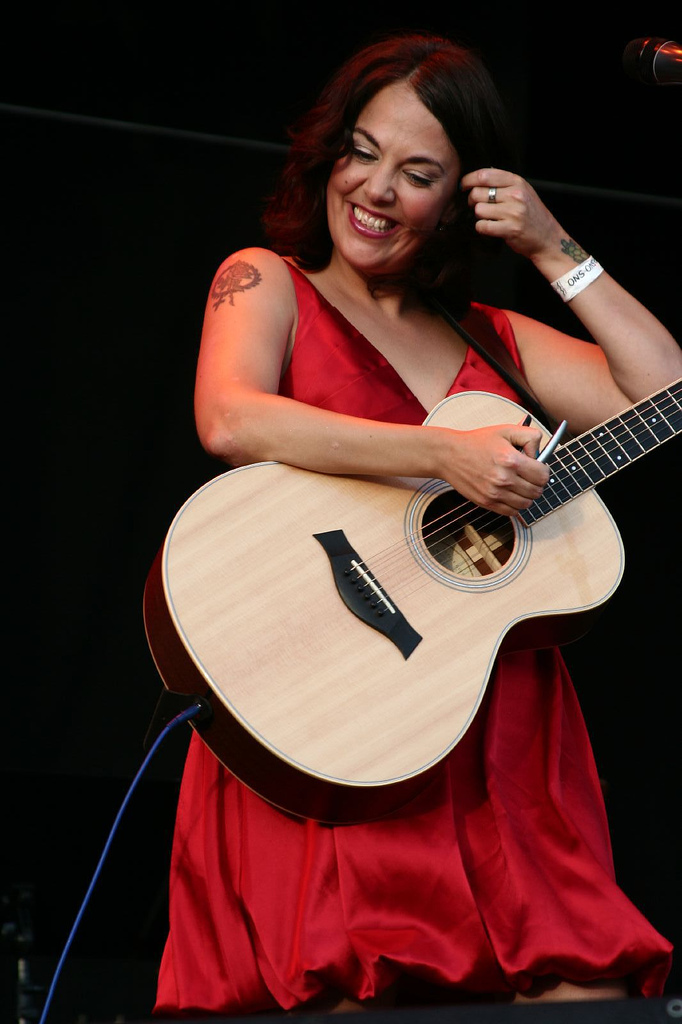
Marit Bergman performing live during Stockholm Pride, 2007

Marit is a Scandinavian female given name equivalent to Margaret. It may refer to:

- Mette-Marit, Queen of Norway (née Tjessem Høiby; (born 1973), wife of King Haakon VIII of Norway
- Marit Aarum (1903–1956), Norwegian economist, politician, civil servant and feminist
- Marit Allen (1941–2007), English fashion journalist and costume designer
- Marit Andreassen (born 1966), Norwegian actress
- Marit Arnstad (born 1962), Norwegian lawyer and politician
- Marit Bergman (born 1975), Swedish pop musician
- Marit Bjørgen (born 1980), Norwegian cross-country skier
- Marit Bouwmeester (born 1988), Dutch sailor
- Marit Breivik (born 1955), Norwegian team handball player
- Marit Christensen (born 1948), Norwegian journalist
- Marit Eikemo (born 1971), Norwegian essayist, novelist, journalist and magazine editor
- Marit Emstad (1841–1929), Norwegian knitter
- Marit Haraldsen (born 1939), Norwegian alpine skier
- Marit Hemstad (1928–1971), Norwegian sprinter
- Marit Henie (1925–2012), Norwegian figure skater
- Marit Kaldhol (born 1955), Norwegian poet and children's writer
- Marit Velle Kile (born 1978), Norwegian actress
- Marit Kolby (born 1975), Norwegian nutritional biologist, university lecturer and author
- Marit Larsen (born 1983), Norwegian singer and songwriter
- Marit Løvvig (born 1938), Norwegian politician
- Marit Maij (born 1972), Dutch politician
- Marit Mikkelsplass (born 1965), Norwegian cross-country skier
- Marit Myrmæl (born 1954), Norwegian cross country skier
- Marit Nybakk (born 1947), Norwegian politician
- Marit Paulsen (born 1939), Norwegian-born Swedish politician
- Marit Rotnes (1928–2022), Norwegian politician
- Marit Sandvik (born 1956), Norwegian jazz singer
- Marit Stiles (born 1969), Canadian politician
- Marit Strindlund (born 1972), Swedish conductor
- Marit Øiseth (1928–1971), Norwegian cross-country skier
- Marit Trætteberg (1930–2009), Norwegian chemist
- Marit Tusvik (born 1951), Norwegian author, poet and playwright
- Marit van Eupen (born 1969), Dutch rower

== See also ==
- Marit (disambiguation)
- Maarit, Finnish given name
