= Henrik Otto Donner =

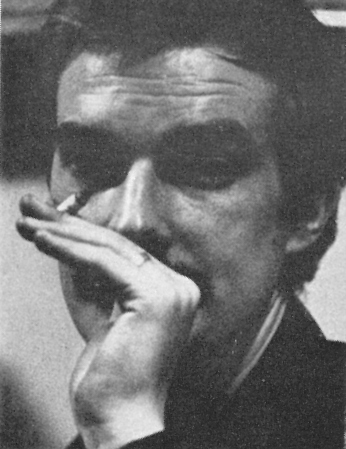
- Henrik Otto Donner in the 1960s

Background information
- Also known as: Otto Donner
- Born: Henrik Otto Donner; 16 November 1939; Tampere, Finland
- Died: 26 June 2013 (aged 73) Jakobstad, Finland
- Genres: pop, rock, jazz, electronic music, contemporary classical music
- Occupations: Composer, arranger, musician
- Instrument: trumpet

Henrik Otto Donner (16 November 1939 – 26 June 2013) was a Finnish composer, musician and all-round music personality. His musical styles varied from pop and rock music to jazz, electronic music and contemporary classical music. Donner's personal instrument was trumpet. He was a member of the famous Finland Swedish Donner family.

== Biography ==
Donner was one of the pioneers of Finnish avant-garde and experimental music as well as an important figure in Finnish left-wing "song movement" of the 1960s and 1970s. He studied at the Sibelius Academy in Helsinki and later in Vienna as a student of György Ligeti. In 1966 Donner was one of the founders of record label Love Records which was a pioneering label in Finnish rock music. Donner collaborated with many Finnish musicians and artists such as Erkki Kurenniemi, Juhani Aaltonen, A. W. Yrjänä, Hasse Walli and Dave Lindholm. He was a film score composer for more than 50 movies and TV-series.

He conducted Finland's entry in Eurovision 1981 in Dublin.

Henrik Otto Donner was found dead at the marina of Jakobstad early on 27 June 2013. The cause of death went unreported.

== See also ==
- Finnish jazz musicians
- Music of Finland
