= Marit (disambiguation) =

Marit is a female given name.

Marit may also refer to:

- Marit, or the Mari people, Finno-Ugric ethnic group, who have traditionally lived along the Volga and Kama rivers in Russia
- Marit ayin (or maris ayin), concept in halakha (Jewish law)
- Myeik, Burma
