= The Mathematician's Air Display =

1977 studio album by Pekka Pohjola

Studio album by Pekka Pohjola
- Released: 1977
- Length: 34:47
- Label: Virgin
- Producer: Pekka Pohjola, Mike Oldfield

Pekka Pohjola chronology
B The Magpie (1974)	The Mathematician's Air Display (1977)	Visitation (1979)

The Mathematician's Air Display (Mysterious Air Display) is the third album by Pekka Pohjola, released in 1977 by Virgin Records. Esoteric Recordings was due to reissue the album on 25 January 2010.

The album is co-produced by Mike Oldfield and features him as guitarist (along with Georg Wadenius). All the material is composed by Pohjola.

The album is known by many names in various countries - in Finland Keesojen lehto, in Sweden Skuggornas tjuvstart, in the Netherlands The Consequences of Indecisions (credited to Mike Oldfield) and in the United States and Italy Untitled (credited to Mike & Sally Oldfield, Pohjola). The original Finnish title translates as "The grove of Keesos". Keesos are leprechaun-like creatures depicted on the cover art of the original issue.

Original track titles are given by Hector.

== Track listings ==
Keesojen lehto (Finland)
1. Oivallettu matkalyhty (5:04)
2. Kädet suoristavat veden (4:34)
3. Matemaatikon lentonäytös (7:25)
4a. Pääntaivuttelun seuraukset: Osa 1 - Sulamaan jätetty kipu (4:30)
4b. Pääntaivuttelun seuraukset: Osa 2 - Nykivä keskustelu tuntemattoman kanssa (11:21)
5. Varjojen varaslähtö (1:53)
Skuggornas Tjuvstart (Sweden)
1. Ljus Och Lykta
2. Vatten Står Sig Slätt I Handen
3. Ramanujans Ryggspinn
4a. Huvudrunkarsviten: Del 1. Innan Värken Börjar Rinna
4b. Huvudrunkarsviten: Del 2. Samtal Med X I N Spasmer
5. Fantomrusning
The Mathematician's Air Display (USA and Italy)
1. The Perceived Journey-Lantern
2. Hands Straighten the Water
3. The Mathematician's Air Display
4a. The Consequences of Head Bending: Part One - The Pain Left Melting
4b. The Consequences of Head Bending: Part Two - The Plot Thickens
5. False Start of the Shadows
The Consequences of Indecisions (The Netherlands), Mike & Sally Oldfield, Pekka Pohjola (USA & Italy), US-101 (USA & Italy)
1. The Sighted Light
2. Hands Calming The Water
3. Mathematical Air Display
4a. The Consequences of Indecisions: Part One - Time Heals All Wounds
4b. The Consequences of Indecisions: Part Two - Comfort With A Stranger
5. False Start

== Personnel ==
- Sally Oldfield – vocals (2, 5)
- Mike Oldfield – guitars (2–4), percussion (4b), mandolin and whistle (5)
- Georg Wadenius – guitar (1, 4b), percussion (4b)
- Wlodek Gulgowski – synthesizer (1, 4b), grand piano (4b)
- Pekka Pohjola – bass guitar (1–5), grand piano (1–3, 4a, 5), spinet (2, 5), synthesizer (3, 4a), string synthesizer (2–4)
- Vesa Aaltonen – drums (1, 4b)
- Pierre Moerlen – drums (3, 5), percussion (4a), glockenspiel (4b)

=== Producers ===
- Paul Lindsay, Mike Oldfield – recording and mixing
- Christer Berg – recording and mixing (tracks 1, 4b)
- Pekka Pohjola & Mike Oldfield – producing
- Risto Kurkinen – cover art (the picture of Keesos)
