= Tabula Rasa (Finnish band) =

Finnish progressive rock band

- Origin: Tampere or Kangasala, Finland
- Genres: Progressive rock
- Years active: 1972–1977
- Label: Love Records
- Past members: Heikki Silvennoinen; Asko Pakkanen; Tapio Suominen; Jukka-Petteri Aronen; Jukka-Petteri Aronen; Jukka Leppilampi; Jukka Salmela; Jarmo Sormunen; Jarno Sinisalo

Tabula Rasa was a progressive rock group from Finland, active from 1972 to 1977.

== History ==
The original members were Heikki Silvennoinen, Asko Pakkanen, and Tapio Suominen. British rock band Cream might have been their biggest source of inspiration though they followed contemporary trends of prog-rock. Jethro Tull and King Crimson were direct progressive rock influences from the United Kingdom.

In 1975, under the record label Love Records, they published their first album "Tabula Rasa" as well as single "Prinssi/Lähtö".

The debut album has been pretty well regarded though Mikko Alatalo's political lyrics have been somewhat controversial. The band was closely associated to this rock singer who wrote lyrics for them and for whom they also worked as backing musicians (Alatalo's gigs brought them more money than playing their own music). Silvennoinen composed most of songs.

They made their second and last album "Ekkedien Tanssi" in 1976.

The band disbanded in 1977. Heikki Silvennoinen and drummer Jukka Aronen left the group due to the fading popularity of prog-rock. Some members also had become religious which decreased their interest in the band.

== Members ==
The line-up of the band was as follows:

- Guitar - Heikki Silvennoinen
- Drums - Asko Pakkanen and Jukka-Petteri Aronen
- Bass - Tapio Suominen
- Vocals - Jukka Leppilampi and Jukka Salmela
- Flute - Jarmo Sormunen
- Piano - Jarno Sinisalo

== Discography ==
Studio albums

- Tabula Rasa (1975)
- Ekkedien Tanssi (1976)
