= Pekka Pöyry =

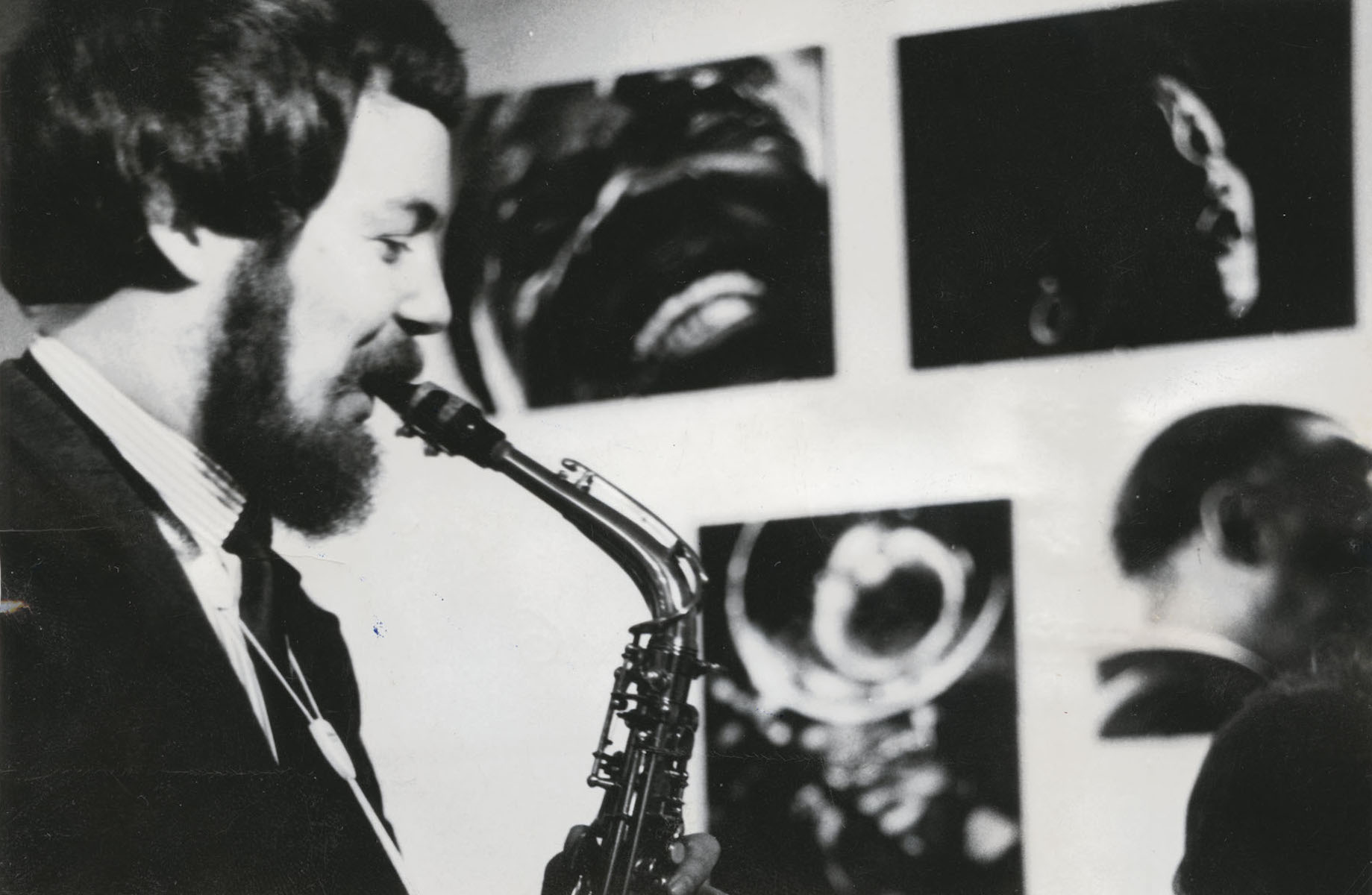
- Pöyry in 1967

Background information
- Born: 10 December 1939; Helsinki, Finland
- Died: 4 August 1980 (aged 40) Helsinki, Finland
- Genres: Jazz
- Instruments: Soprano saxophone, flute

Pekka Juhani Pöyry (10 December 1939 – 4 August 1980) was a Finnish jazz and rock saxophonist and flutist. He was part of the Pekka Pöyry Quartet and Quintet.

== Early life ==
Pöyry was born in Helsinki. He became interested in jazz music at school and began studying the violin and clarinet. He was, however, more taken with playing the alto saxophone, inspired by Charlie Parker. In addition, he played the flute and soprano saxophone.

== Career ==
After graduating with a Master of Laws in 1966, Pöyry decided to become a professional musician. In the same year he represented YLE, EBU's concert in London. The mid-1960s, he had his own quartet with pianist Eero Ojanen, bassist Teppo Hauta-aho and drummer Reino Laine. They performed at the 1966 Pori Jazz Festival and were joined by the Norwegian-Finnish singer Pia Skaar to form a quintet. In May 1967, the quintet appeared at the Tallinn Jazz Festival. In a 1969 interview, Bill Evans described the quartet's performance (although couldn't remember the name) at the 1969 Montreux Jazz Festival, where they won as "marvelous" and "highly professional". He increasingly became interested in progressive rock and jazz fusion in the late 1960s and 1970s. With his later groups he attempted international breakthrough, including the Reading Festival in England in 1973. His band, Tasavallan Presidentti, however, broke up in 1974. He also played with Wigwam.

In 1975, Pöyry toured northern Europe with the North Jazz Quintet, and later he joined the orchestra of Heikki Sarmanto, later the UMO Jazz Orchestra, playing the Ljubljana Festival in what was then Yugoslavia in 1976. He also performed in Poland, Czechoslovakia, Cuba, the Soviet Union, Britain and the United States with other bands.

== Personal life ==
A manic depressive, Pöyry committed suicide in 1980 in Helsinki. The Pekka Pöyry Award is named in his honor and given to young, talented saxophonists in Finland, awarded since the early-1980s.
