= Finnforest (band) =

Finnish progressive rock band

Finnforest was a Finnish progressive rock band, formed in 1972, from Kuopio, Finland. The band was established by twins, Pekka (guitar, bass) and Jussi Tegelman (drums), together with Jukka Rissanen (keyboards, synthesiser) and Aaro Mustonen (vocals). They started as a jazz fusion band and drew their influences from Mahavishnu Orchestra. The released a single, "Tyhjyyteen, Syvyyteen" in 1973, soon afterwards Mustonen left and the band started playing instrumental music.

Their debut eponymous album, released in 1975 on Love Records, was considered to be their most prog rock-oriented album. Rissanen left the band, to study classical music in Hungary, before they started recording their sophomore album. At that point the band had two additional keyboardists, Jukka Linkola and Peretti Pokki, an additional bassist, Jarmo Hiekkala, and a string quartet. Lähtö Matkalle was released in 1976 on Love Records and is considered by some to be their best release. They released a single, "Ketto" / "Tekee Meisseliä", from the album.

For the band's last recorded album, Demonnights, they added a second guitarist, Jari Rissanen, two saxophonists, Heikki Keskinen and Juhani Aaltonen and a new bass player, Tuomo Helin, and keyboardist Jarmo Savolainen. The album was released in 1979, was heavily influenced by Weather Report and had more of a jazz-fusion feel than their previous releases.

== Members ==
The line-up has included the following musicians:

- Pekka Tegelman (drums, bass, guitars)
- Jussi Tegelman (drums)
- Jukka Rissanen (keyboards)
- Aaro Mustonen (vocals)
- Jukka Linkola (keyboards)
- Pertti Pokki (keyboards)
- Jarmo Savolainen (keyboards)
- Jarmo Hiekkala (bass)
- Tuomo Helin (bass)
- Jari Rissanen (guitar)
- Heikki Keskinen (saxophone)

== Discography ==
=== Albums ===
- Finnforest - Love Records LRLP 136 (1975)
- Lähtö Matkalle - Love Records LRLP 193 (1976)
- Demonnights - Love Records LRLP 306 (1979)

=== Singles ===
- "Tyhjyyteen, Syvyyteen" - Dynamiitti LSD 2 (1973)
- "Ketto" / "Tekee Meisseliä" - Love Records LRS 2120 (1976)
