= Pekka Pohjola =

Finnish musician, composer, and producer (1952–2008)

- Born: Jussi Pekka Pohjola; 13 January 1952
- Origin: Helsinki, Finland
- Died: 27 November 2008 (aged 56)
- Genres: Progressive rock, jazz fusion
- Occupations: Musician
- Instruments: Bass, keyboards, violin
- Years active: 1970–2008
- Website: rockadillo.fi/pekka-pohjola/
- Family: Sakari Oramo (cousin); Verneri Pohjola (son)

Jussi Pekka Pohjola (13 January 1952 – 27 November 2008) was a Finnish multi-instrumentalist, composer and producer. Best known as a bass player, Pohjola was also a classically trained pianist and violinist.

Pohjola rose to fame as the bass player of the Finnish progressive rock band Wigwam, but he soon departed on a solo career, initially releasing Frank Zappa–influenced progressive rock albums. As his career progressed Pohjola developed a more novel musical style that could best be described as fusion jazz. In addition to Wigwam and his solo albums, Pohjola played with the band Made in Sweden, The Group and the bands of Jukka Tolonen and Mike Oldfield.

Pohjola belonged to one of the most prominent musical families in Finland. Conductor Sakari Oramo is Pohjola's cousin, and Verneri Pohjola is his son.

== Biography ==
=== Early life and career ===
Pohjola was born in Helsinki, Finland and studied classical piano and violin at the Sibelius Academy in the city. After a stint with The Boys (the seminal Finnish band led by brothers Eero and Jussi Raittinen), he joined Wigwam in 1970, contributing on two of their albums before leaving the group in 1972 to pursue a solo career (although he contributed again on Wigwam's Being in 1974). Pohjola's first solo album, Pihkasilmä Kaarnakorva (Resin Eye Bark Ear), released in 1972, bears a notable resemblance to the work of Frank Zappa.

After leaving Wigwam, Pohjola played with the Jukka Tolonen Band for a short time. In 1974 his second solo album, Harakka Bialoipokku (Bialoipokku the Magpie), was released in Finland. The album saw Pohjola's sound developing in a more distinctive direction, with heavy use of trumpets, saxophones and piano. The somewhat jazz-influenced album sufficiently piqued the interest of Virgin Records executive Richard Branson for him to release it in the United Kingdom the following year under the name B the Magpie. The album was re-released, in October 2010, by Cherry Red Records.

At the request of Virgin, Pohjola teamed up with Mike Oldfield to record and produce his third solo album, released in 1977 in Finland as Keesojen Lehto (Grove of the Keeso) and in the UK as The Mathematician's Air Display. The album was released, in Germany (1981, album and cassette) and Italy (1987) as simply Mike & Sally Oldfield / Pekka Pohjola. The album was also released in 1981 on the Happy Bird label, in the Netherlands, under the name The Consequences of Indecisions and credited to Oldfield instead of Pohjola. Oldfield asked Pohjola to join him on his 1978 tour and Pohjola can be heard on Oldfield's live album Exposed, released in 1979.

In 1978 Pohjola formed The Group, which released a self-titled album that same year. In 1979 Pohjola released Visitation, his fourth solo album. All of Pohjola's 1970s solo albums exhibited fantasy influences, but these were undoubtedly strongest on his 1979 Visitation.

=== 1980s ===
In 1980 The Group changed its name to Pekka Pohjola Group and released the album Kätkävaaran Lohikäärme (The Dragon of Kätkävaara), with musicians Pohjola on bass and with Ippe Kätkä (drums), Pekka Tyni (keyboards) and Seppo Tyni (guitars). The group disbanded soon after the release of their second album.

Pohjola's next solo album, Urban Tango, was released in 1982. It was a radical departure from fantasy- and nature-inspired works of the '70s. It was also the first Pekka Pohjola album to feature comprehensible singing, the vocals provided by Kassu Halonen. Urban Tango was also the first of Pohjola's albums to be released on his own Pohjola Records label. His next album was the soundtrack to Hannu Heikinheimo's 1983 movie Jokamies (released in 1984 under the title Everyman in the United States and Germany). The album was notable for an abundant use of synthesizers. Space Waltz, released in 1985, further explored the themes first heard on Urban Tango (1982). 1986's Flight of the Angel was to be Pohjola's last album of the '80s. The following year a compilation of his material was released under the name New Impressionist.

Pohjola's record label in the United States during the 1980s was Breakthru' Records, a pioneering audiophile record company started by Robert Silverstein in 1983. The advent of the compact disc in 1984 made it very difficult for independent American record labels to make CD pressings in the U.S. as the first plants, aside from the Sony plant in Indiana, were in Germany and Japan. As a result, Breakthru' scrambled and forfeited away its rights to unscrupulous distributors in an effort to adapt to the fast changing audio landscape of the music business during 1984 and 1986. With the 1985 release of Space Waltz, Breakthru' Records became the first label ever to release a compact disc by Pohjola. The first Pohjola album to be released on CD, Space Waltz was mastered in New York City by mastering engineer legend Greg Calbi. Pressed on CD in Switzerland, Space Waltz was also released by Breakthru' Records on audiophile vinyl and cassette. Robert Silverstein's 1980 interview with Pohjola can be found on the Music Web Express 3000 (www.mwe3.com) web site.

=== Later life and death ===
During the late '80s Pohjola composed Sinfonia No 1 ("Symphony No. 1"), which premiered live in 1989 and was released on CD in 1990, performed by the Avanti! Chamber Orchestra. Returning to the music scene in 1992, Pohjola released his ninth solo album, Changing Waters. The album's sound differed greatly from Pohjola's guitar-driven works of the '80s, offering a softer, more piano-based soundscape. Changing Waters was given in an international release in spring 1993. The album featured Finnish top musicians Seppo Kantonen (keyboards), Markku Kanerva (guitar) and Anssi Nykänen (drums), who became Pohjola's regular band. In May 1995, Pohjola released Live in Japan, a recording from three shows in Tokyo in November 1994. Later that year, Pohjola released a double CD, Heavy Jazz - Live in Helsinki and Tokyo. His next studio album, Pewit, followed in September 1997. In May 2001 Pekka Pohjola released Views, on which he toned down the rock-solid guitar-based sound of Urban Tango (1982) and Space Waltz (1985), instead focusing more on jazz and pop-classical arrangements, leaning heavily on strings and brass arrangements. The only song on Views to feature a guitar is "The Red Porsche", after a poem written by Charles Bukowski.

Pohjola's piece "The Madness Subsides" from B the Magpie (1974) was sampled by DJ Shadow as the main bass line in his song "Midnight in a Perfect World", from the successful debut album Endtroducing..... (1996).

On 27 November 2008 Pohjola, who had alcoholism, died of an epileptic seizure at the age of 56.

== Family ==
Pekka Pohjola was part of the renowned Pohjola musical family. His father was choir director and cellist Ensti Pohjola. Choreographer and music pedagogue Erkki Pohjola and violinist and conductor Paavo Pohjola were his uncles, and pianist Liisa Pohjola was his aunt. His younger brother Jukka Pohjola is a violinist. One of his three sons, Verneri Pohjola, is a trumpeter, and another one, Ilmari Pohjola, is a trombonist. His cousins include conductor Sakari Oramo, cellist Matti Pohjola and composer Seppo Pohjola.

== Discography ==
Year	Artist	Original title	Alternate titles
1970	Wigwam	Tombstone Valentine	
1971	Wigwam	Fairyport	
1972	Pekka Pohjola	Pihkasilmä Kaarnakorva	
1974	Wigwam	Being	
1974	Pekka Pohjola	Harakka Bialoipokku	(United Kingdom) B the Magpie, released on Virgin Records (Sweden) Skatan
1976	Made in Sweden	Where Do We Begin?	
1977	Pekka Pohjola	Keesojen Lehto	(United Kingdom) The Mathematician's Air Display (Sweden) Skuggornas Tjuvstart (Netherlands) The Consequences of Indecisions (credited to Mike Oldfield) (United States) (Italy) (Germany) Untitled (credited to Mike & Sally Oldfield, Pekka Pohjola)
1978	The Group	The Group	
1979	Mike Oldfield	Exposed (live album)	
1979	Pekka Pohjola	Visitation	
1979	Gábor Szabó	Belsta River	
1980	Pekka Pohjola Group	Kätkävaaran Lohikäärme	
1982	Pekka Pohjola	Urban Tango	
1983	Pekka Pohjola	Jokamies	(United States) Everyman
1985	Pekka Pohjola	Space Waltz	
1986	Pekka Pohjola	Flight of the Angel	
1986	Espoo Big Band	Yesterday's Games	
1987	Pekka Pohjola	New Impressionist (compilation)	
1990	Pekka Pohjola & AVANTI!	Sinfonia No 1	
1992	Pekka Pohjola	Changing Waters	
1995	Pekka Pohjola	Live in Japan	
1995	Pekka Pohjola	Heavy Jazz - Live in Helsinki and Tokyo	
1997	Pekka Pohjola	Pewit	
2001	Pekka Pohjola	Views	
