= Kaseva =

Finnish pop rock band

Kaseva is a Finnish pop rock band from Tampere, Finland. Kaseva is well known from its beautiful melodies, harmony singing and playing 12 string guitars, and combining many styles of music and instruments. In the Finnish newspapers they were some times called "Finland's Lennon and McCartney". Kaseva have had some of their inspiration from the music of The Beatles, yet Kaseva has its own unique sound and style. The name Kaseva comes from the book of the epic poems, Kalevala, and it means handy.

== Members ==
The Members of the Kaseva are Mikko Jokela (vocals, 12-string guitar), Nils Jokela (drums), Jouko Järvinen (bass, vocals), Tapio Virtanen (electric guitar, vocals) and Tapio Rauma (electric guitar, vocals). Mikko and Nils are brothers. One of the original members, Asko Raivio, died in 1989. Mikko Jokela and Asko Raivio have composed most of the Kaseva's songs.

== History ==
Tapio Virtanen started in the band in 2003. Kaseva's first album was released in 1974. They made a successful come back in the year 2002. The CD collection of the old songs in 2003 have sold platinum record in Finland.

== Discography ==
- Monen Vuoden Jalkeen (2003)
