= Juhani Aaltonen =

Finnish jazz saxophonist and flautist

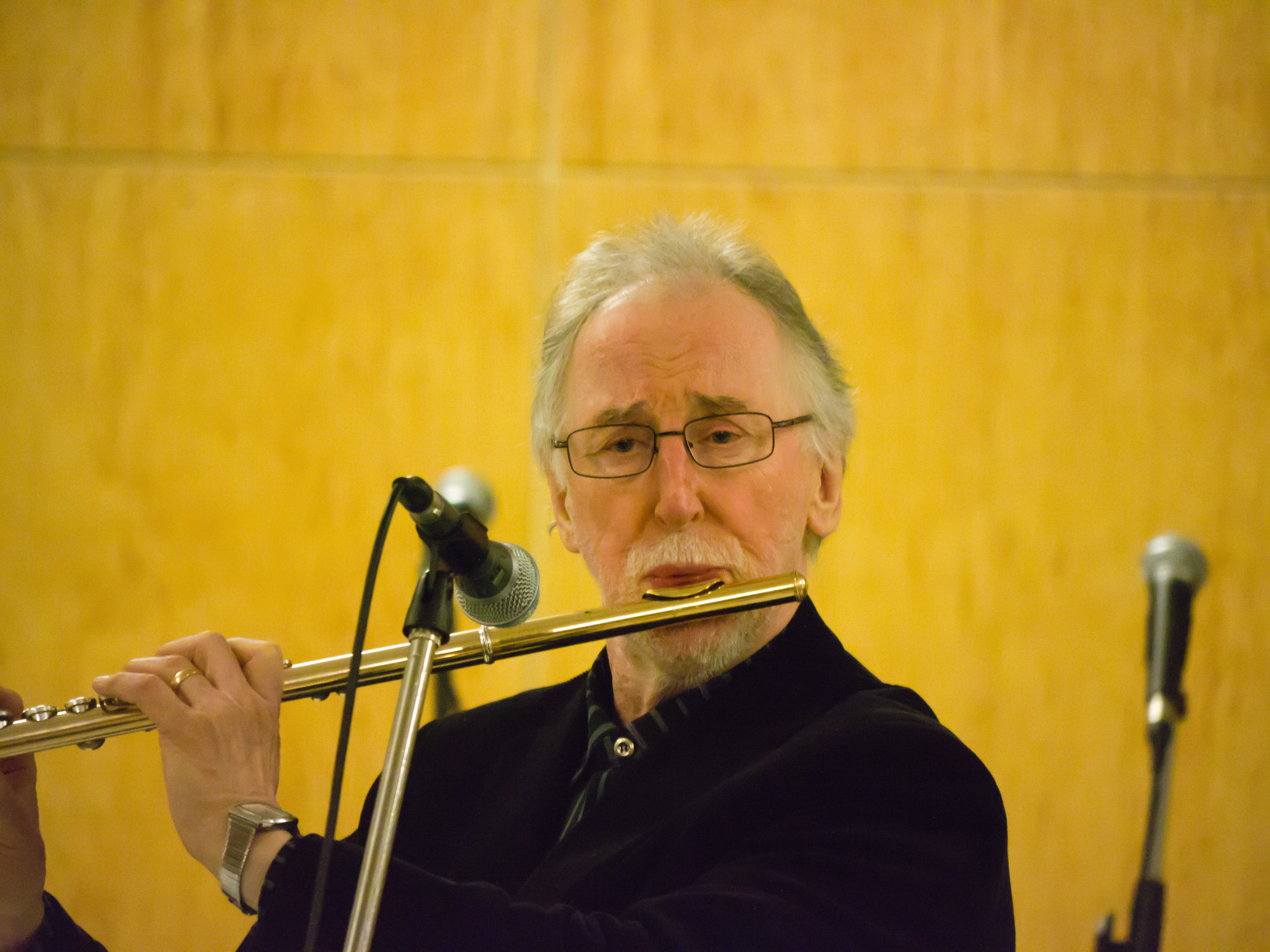
- Aaltonen in 2011
- Born: December 12, 1935 (age 90)
- Education: Sibelius Academy, Berklee College of Music
- Occupations: Saxophonist and flautist

Juhani Aaltonen (born December 12, 1935) is a Finnish jazz saxophonist and flautist.

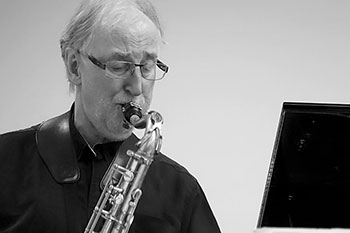
Juhani Aaltonen in Aarhus Denmark 2014

Born in Kouvola, Finland, he studied at Sibelius Academy and Berklee College of Music. He began playing professionally at the end of the 1950s. He played in a sextet led by Heikki Rosendahl during that time, and then studied flute performance at the Sibelius Academy and in the U.S. at the Berklee College of Music. Moving back to Finland, he settled in Helsinki and began working both as a session musician and with fusion groups. Later in the 1960s he formed a duo with Edward Vesala, as well as in the group Eero Koivistoinen for four years. He played with Tasavallan Presidentti in their earlier days, including for their first, eponymous, album. He recorded with Thad Jones and Mel Lewis and with Heikki Sarmanto in the late 1960s and early 1970s, and his first album as a soloist, Etiquette, was released in 1974.

In 1975, he became a member of the New Music Orchestra, and worked with the Nordic All Stars, Arild Andersen, and Peter Brötzmann later in the 1970s. The 1980s saw him working with the UFO Big Band, Jan Garbarek, Charlie Mariano, and others. He was granted a 15-year state grant from Finland in the mid-1980s. In 1983 he rejoined Tasavallan Presidentti, and has recorded and toured with them since. He was featured in a profile on composer Graham Collier in the 1985 Channel 4 documentary 'Hoarded Dreams' He led a touring quartet from 1990 to 1992 with Olli Ahvenlahti, Heikki Virtanen and Reino Laine. Aaltonen and Heikki Sarmanto released a duo recording, Rise, in 2001; in 2003 Aaltonen's trio album Mother Tongue won a Jazz-Emma in Finland. Aaltonen continues to teach at the annual Nilsiä Music Camp.

== Discography ==
- Etiquette, 1974
- Strings, 1976, with Henrik Otto Donner
- Springbird, 1979
- Prana. Live at Groovy, 1982
- Déjà Vu, 2000, with Art Farmer, Heikki Sarmanto, Pekka Sarmanto, Jukka-Pekka Uotila and Tapio Aaltonen
- Rise, 2001, with Heikki Sarmanto
- Mother Tongue, 2003, with Ulf Krokfors with Tom Nekljudow
- Strings Revisited, 2003, with Reggie Workman, Andrew Cyrille and the Avanti! Chamber Orchestra
- Suhka, 2003, with Jone Takamäki, Tane Kannisto, Verneri Pohjola, Patrik Latvala, Seppo Kantonen, Jarmo Savolainen, Pekka Nylund, Antti Hytti, Ulf Krokfors, Tom Nekljudow, and Stefan Paavola
- Reflections, 2004, with Reggie Workman and Andrew Cyrille
- Wonders Never Cease, 2005, with Mikko Iivanainen and Klaus Suonsaari
- Illusion of a Ballad, 2006, with Ulf Krokfors and Tom Nekljudow
- The Sky is Ruby, 2007, UMO Jazz Orchestra with Raoul Björkenheim and Iro Haarla
- Conclusions, 2009, with Iro Haarla, Ulf Krokfors, and Reino Laine

=== As sideman ===
With Arild Andersen

- Shimri (ECM, 1976)
- Green Shading into Blue (ECM, 1978)

With Graham Collier

- Hoarded Dreams (Cuneiform, 1983 [2007])

With Edward Vesala

- Nan Madol (JAPO, 1974)
- Satu (ECM, 1977)

== See also ==
- Finnish jazz musicians
- Music of Finland
