= Tasavallan Presidentti =

Finnish progressive rock band

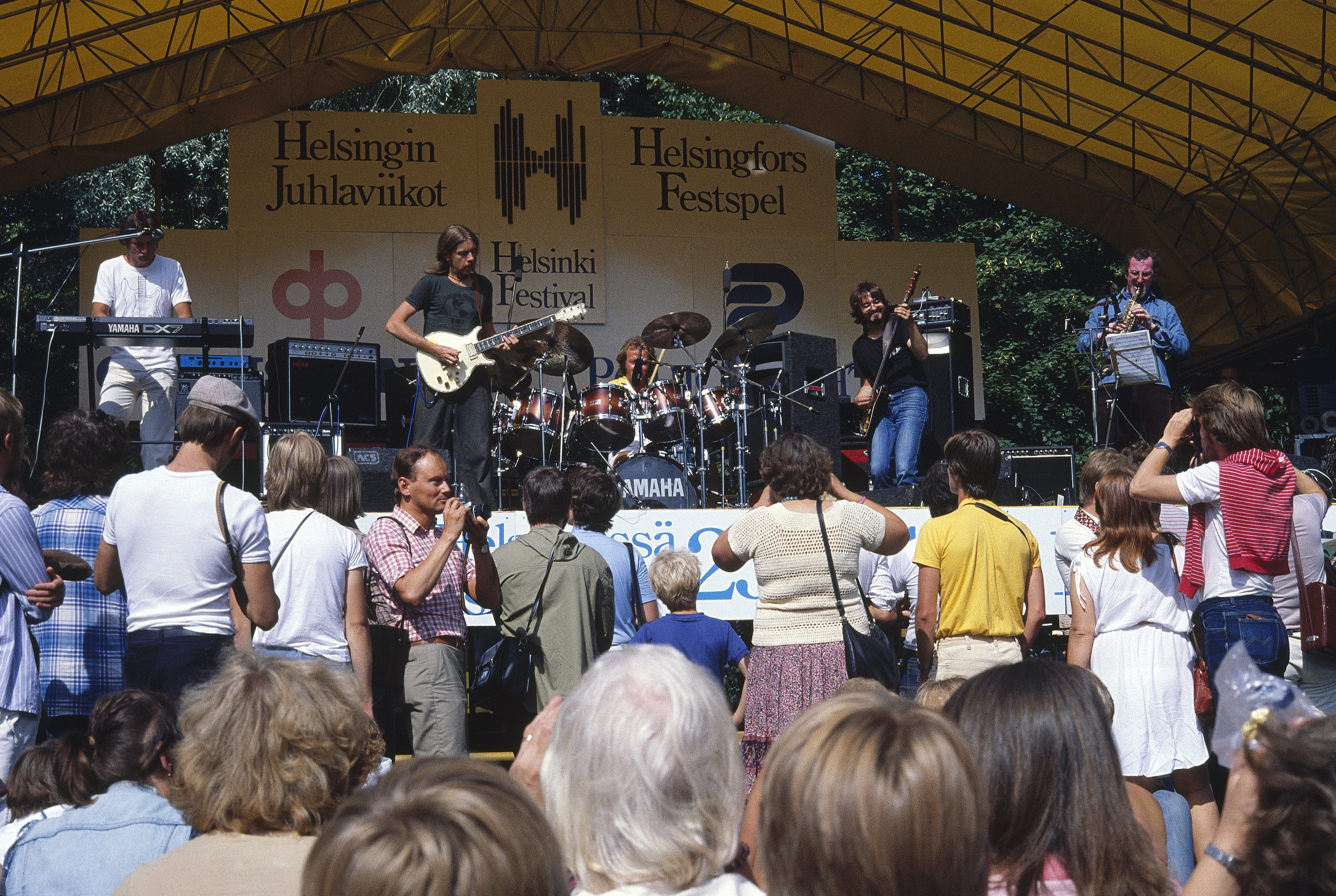
- A concert in the 1980s

Background information
- Origin: Helsinki, Finland
- Genres: Progressive rock, jazz fusion
- Years active: 1969–1974; 1983; 1990; 1995; 1999–2007
- Labels: EMI; Love; Janus; Akbazar; Presence
- Past members: Jukka Tolonen; Frank Robson; Vesa Aaltonen; Juhani Aaltonen; Heikki Virtanen; Måns Groundstroem; Pekka Pöyry; Eero Raittinen; Esa Kotilainen

Tasavallan Presidentti (in English President of the Republic) is a Finnish progressive rock band. It was founded in 1969 by guitarist Jukka Tolonen and drummer Vesa Aaltonen. Other founder members were Måns Groundstroem (bass) and Frank Robson (vocals), previously of Blues Section. Juhani Aaltonen (saxophone/flute) had earlier played in Soulset; he was replaced in 1970 by Pekka Pöyry. Eero Raittinen replaced Robson as a vocalist in 1972, the same year as the album Lambertland was released in UK. The album was a tight fusion of jazz and folk rock with highly inventive and imaginative lyrics which charted at the number 7 position in Finland. Milky Way Moses reached number 12 in Finland in 1974. The band toured in continental Europe and the United Kingdom in 1973 and 1974, but Pöyry, stricken with bouts of manic depression, was occasionally replaced with keyboardist Esa Kotilainen on live dates. Their English shows included appearances at Ronnie Scott's, regarded by one British critic of the time as 'a mark of their pedigree'.

Tasavallan Presidentti disbanded in 1974, then reunited from 2005 to 2006 with original saxophonist Juhani Aaltonen, as Pöyry had committed suicide in 1980. The band celebrated its fiftieth anniversary with two concerts in December 2019 in Helsinki and Tampere.

== Discography ==
=== Albums ===
- Tasavallan Presidentti (1969)
- Pekka Streng with Tasavallan Presidentti: Magneettimiehen kuolema (1970)
- Tasavallan Presidentti (II) (1971)
- Lambertland (1972)
- Milky Way Moses (1974)
- Classics (compilation) (1990)
- Still Struggling for Freedom (live) (2001)
- Tasavallan Presidentti Six (2005, EP)
- Six Complete (2006)
- Pop-Liisa 1 (2016)
- The Lost 1971 Studio Session (2023)

=== Singles ===
- Time Alone with You / Obsolete Machine (1969)
- Solitary / Deep Thinker (1970)
- Kirka Babitzin & Tasavallan Presidentti: Saat kaiken / Kaukainen valo (1970)
- Sisältäni portin löysin / Selvä näkijä (1972)

== Band members ==
- Frank Robson – vocals, keyboards (1969–1972, 1983-)
- Eero Raittinen – vocals (1972–1974, 1995, 2000)
- Juhani Aaltonen – saxophone, flute (1969–1970, 1983-)
- Pekka Pöyry – saxophone, flute (1970–1974)
- Jukka Tolonen – guitar
- Esa Kotilainen – keyboards (1974, 1990, 1995)
- Måns Groundstroem – bass (1969–1972, 1983–2002)
- Heikki Virtanen – bass (1973–1974, 2002-)
- Vesa Aaltonen – drums
