= Jim Pembroke =

British musician (1946–2021)

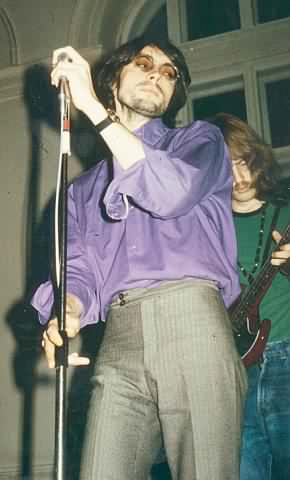
- Pembroke in 1969

Background information
- Born: James Francis Pembroke; 27 January 1946; London, England
- Died: 8 October 2021 (aged 75) Kansas City, Missouri, US
- Genre: Rock
- Occupations: Singer, songwriter, keyboardist
- Formerly of: Wigwam

James Francis Pembroke (27 January 1946 – 8 October 2021) was a British music producer, musician and the vocalist of the Finnish progressive rock band Wigwam. After emigrating to Finland in 1965, Jim Pembroke became a fixture of the Finnish progressive rock scene with Wigwam, and his own solo career.

== Life and career ==
Pembroke was born in London, and played with London group Taverners' Guild before arriving in Finland in 1965. Pembroke came to see his Finnish girlfriend whom he had met in England. The visit would last longer than he expected.

He immediately found himself in some demand, gigging on an ad hoc basis with various lineups such as the Beatmakers, later renamed Jormas, until forming The Pems. He joined Blues Section in 1967, recording a blues-jazz-pop fusion album now considered seminal in Finnish rock. He wrote a large part of the band's recorded songs.

After the band folded in spring 1968, Pembroke worked at the Love Records office. Pembroke also taught himself piano, then joined Wigwam in early 1969. He remained their frontman and principal songwriter, while also releasing occasional solo records. Pembroke was also involved in numerous other artists' records even during the Wigwam days. As instrumentalist he can be heard on Kaseva's (a pop band) and Tabula Rasa's (a prog-rock band) debut albums. He also composed music and wrote lyrics for Finnish singer Maarit and the rock band Hurriganes.

During the 1980s, Pembroke also made music for tv-films.

In the mid-1990s, he moved to the United States, married, and later lived in Kansas City, Missouri. Pembroke worked with local American musicians there. He visited Finland a couple of times during the late 1990s, giving various concerts such as with re-formed Blues Section. In 2013, Pembroke was granted an artist's pension by the Finnish state.

Pembroke died in Kansas City on 8 October 2021, aged 75.

== Solo discography ==
- Wicked Ivory (under the pseudonym "Hot Thumbs O'Riley"), Love Records 1972
- Pigworm, Love Records 1974
- Corporal Cauliflowers Mental Function, Love Records 1977
- Flat Broke (as the "Jim Pembroke Band"), Ponsi 1980
- Party Upstairs, Johanna 1981
- If the Rain Comes, TUM Records 2014
