= Maarit Hurmerinta =

Finnish singer

Maarit Hurmerinta (Maarit)
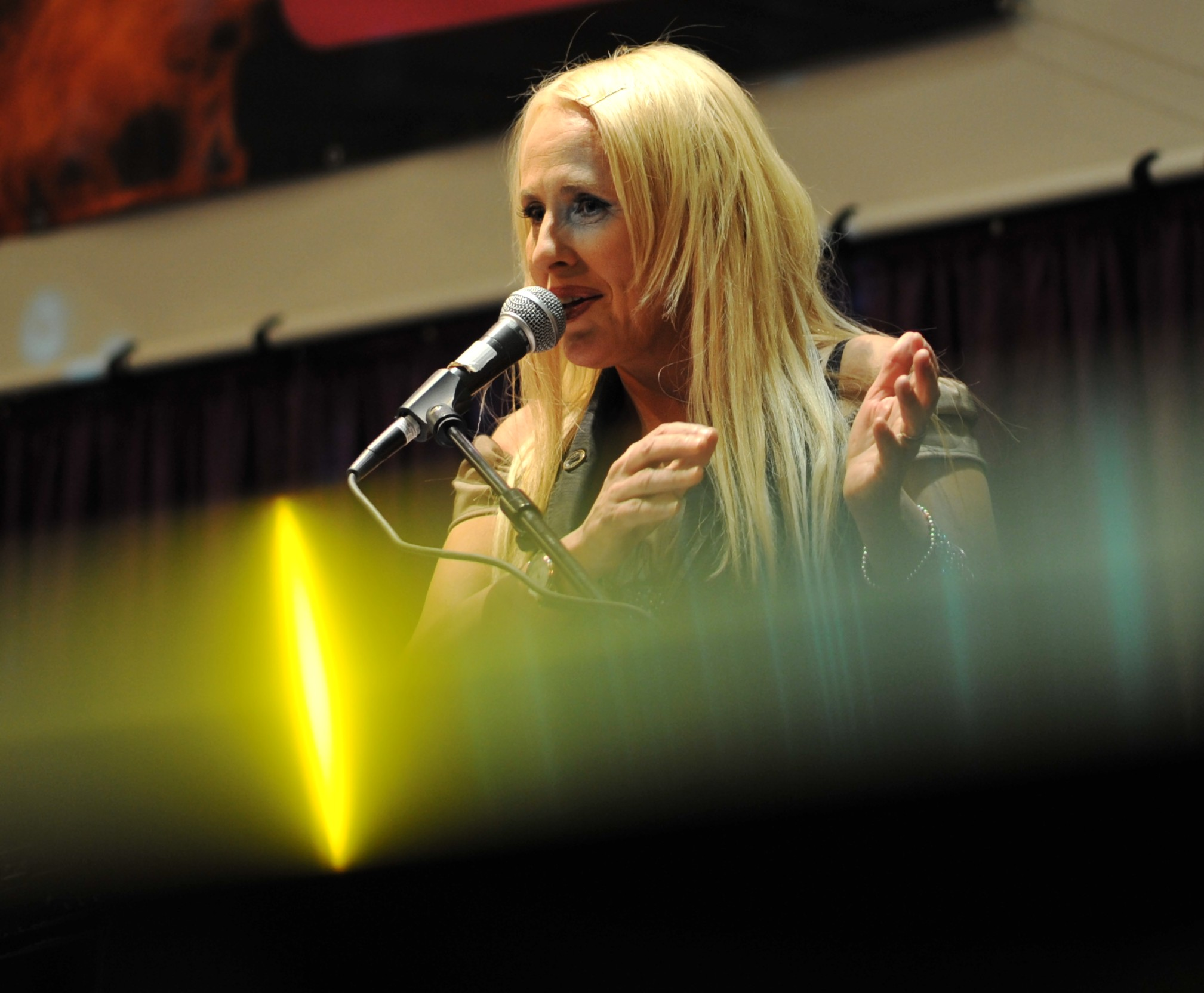

Background information
- Birth name: Maarit Helena Hurmerinta
- Born: 10 November 1953 (age 71); Helsinki, Finland
- Genres: Pop
- Years active: 1973 – present
- Website: www.maarithurmerinta.net

Maarit Helena Hurmerinta (born in Helsinki on 10 November 1953) is a Finnish singer and musician. She is better known by her mononym Maarit. Maarit is the granddaughter of Italian musician Michele Orlando. Maarit's daughter Janna Hurmerinta is also a singer known by her mononym Janna.

== Discography ==
=== Albums ===
Studio albums

- 1973: Maarit
- 1975: Viis' pientä
- 1978: Siivet saan
- 1980: Nykyajan lapsi
- 1981: Elämän maku
- 1983: Nukun radio päällä
- 1986: Tuuli ja taivas
- 1988: Tuskan tanssi
- 1990: Jotain on mulla mielessäni
- 1993: Jos tahdot tietää

Year	Album	Peak positions
Year	Album	FIN
1995	Sydäntäsi lainaisin	39
1998	Sitä mitä rakastan	28
2001	Metsän tyttö	13
2004	Good Days, Bad Days	9
2006	Nälkää ja rakkautta	9
2008	Kun yö saapuu	19
2013	Miten elämästä kertoisin	7
2019	Sumuinen puutarha	36

Live albums

Year	Album	Peak positions
Year	Album	FIN
1999	Stoalive	10

Compilation albums

Year	Album	Peak positions
Year	Album	FIN
2002	Laakson liljasta metsän tyttöön – Kaikki parhaat	13
