= Love Records =

Finnish record label

Love Records was a record label from Finland established in 1966 by Christian Schwindt. It specialized in Finnish rock and also released jazz, leftist political songs, and ethnic music.

Love released 384 LPs, 253 C-cassettes, 347 singles and 24 EPs. It was founded in October 1966 by journalist Atte Blom, jazz drummer Christian Schwindt and composer and all-round music personality Henrik Otto Donner. The first release was an LP consisting of the songs of Kaj Chydenius, sung by Kaisa Korhonen, Kalle Holmberg and Vesa-Matti Loiri. One of the most important rock bands of the early Love Records was Blues Section, which later on spawned such classic bands of Finnish progressive rock as Wigwam and Tasavallan Presidentti, who also released their records on Love. The famous Love Records logo was designed by Harri Manner.

In the 1970s Love Records released most of the important Finnish rock bands and artists: Suomen Talvisota 1939–1940, Pekka Streng, Rauli Badding Somerjoki, Hector, Hurriganes, Dave Lindholm, Juice Leskinen, Kaseva, Maarit; more progressive rock bands such as Tabula Rasa, Finnforest and Piirpauke; "the godfather of Finnish underground", M.A. Numminen; and later on also such punk and new wave artists as Maukka Perusjätkä, and also Briard and Pelle Miljoona, which were Andy McCoy's bands before Hanoi Rocks .

Of the political bands signed to Love Records, some of the most notable are Agit-Prop and KOM-Teatteri. Also Kaisa Korhonen, Aulikki Oksanen and Kristiina Halkola were some female singers known for Love's political albums, where songs were often penned by such people as Kaj Chydenius and Eero Ojanen. Often these were cabaret-type songs in the tradition of Bertolt Brecht and Kurt Weill or even Finnish translations of the songs by Brecht and Weill.

Love Records went bankrupt in 1979. Their last release was Kari Peitsamo's album Pölypilleri. Atte Blom continued after Love with his new label, Johanna Kustannus. Love Records' back catalog has been re-released on CD by Siboney.

On 4 July 2016 the label was resurrected with the release of Ville Valo's single "Olet mun kaikuluotain".

== See also ==
- List of record labels
