= Babitzin =

Babitzin is a surname. Notable people with the surname include:

- Kirill "Kirka" Babitzin (1950–2007), Finnish singer
- Marija "Muska" Babitzin (born 1952), Finnish singer
- Sammy Babitzin (1948–1973), Finnish singer, brother of Kirka and Muska
