= The Spell (Kirka album) =

Studio album by Kirka
- Released: 1987
- Genre: Hard rock, heavy metal
- Label: Flamingo, Bluebird, Sony BMG Music Entertainment
- Producer: Kassu Halonen, Kristian Jernström

Kirka chronology
R.O.C.K. (1986)	The Spell (1987)	Surun pyyhit silmistäni (1988)

Singles from The Spell
- 1. "I Don't Wanna Fight / No Return" Released: 1987; 2. "You Put the Spell On Me" Released: 1987

The Spell is a 1987 hard rock album by Kirka. Following in the style of the R.O.C.K. album, the songs were all in English with a distinct hard rock sound, however, losing some of the aggressiveness of the first album. The album also did not feature covers by other rock acts.

Despite selling well (receiving Gold certification in Finland), Kirka later resumed with his easy listening material, mainly because performing for younger audiences was not providing enough revenue for him to make a living for himself. It would also be Kirka's final all English album until 1995's Sadness in Your Eyes, which was musically more close to Kirka's romantic and easy listening material.

== Track listing ==
All songs were written and composed by Kisu Jernström and Kassu Halonen, except for "One Day" and "Dont Steal My Heart" which were composed by Kassu Halonen and lyrics written by Edu Kettunen and Esa Kaartamo respectively.

1. You Put the Spell On Me
2. I Don't Wanna Fight
3. One Day
4. Under the Pressure of Your Love
5. Fly Away
6. No Return
7. Don't Steal My Heart
8. I'm Sailing Away
