= R.O.C.K. =

Studio album by Kirka
- Released: 1986
- Genre: Hard rock
- Producer: Kassu Halonen; Kristian Jernström

R.O.C.K. is a 1986 hard rock/heavy metal album by Finnish musician Kirka. A major departure from Kirka's typical easy listening albums, the album featured English language lyrics, written by Kassu Halonen, and was largely hard rock oriented. Although Kirka had done covers by rock artists in the past, R.O.C.K. was his first full-fledged rock-album.

It was followed the next year by The Spell after which Kirka resumed with his better known ballad material.

== Track listing ==
1. R.O.C.K. Rock
2. Strangers in the Night
3. In My Dreams
4. School's Out (Alice Cooper cover)
5. You get me up
6. Born to be Wild (Steppenwolf cover)
7. Bad brakes
8. You
9. Set me free
10. I'll be yours.

Kassu Halonen, one of the songwriters on the album, later covered Strangers in the Night on I Have Played Rock n Roll.

== External sources ==
- Kirka's biography and discography on Pomus
- Album on Kirka.com
