= Kirka =

Finnish singer (1950–2007)

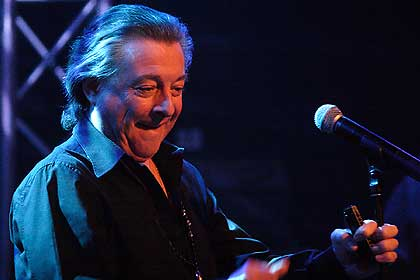
- Kirka during his last public performance in 2007

Background information
- Born: Kirill Babitzin; 22 September 1950; Helsinki, Finland
- Died: 31 January 2007 (aged 56) Helsinki, Finland
- Genres: Finnish rock; hard rock (1986–1987); pop
- Occupation: Singer
- Years active: 1962–2007
- Website: kirka.com

Kirill "Kirka" Babitzin (Russian: Кирилл Бабицын; 22 September 1950 in Helsinki, Finland – 31 January 2007 in Helsinki, Finland) was a Finnish vocalist and musician. One of the most commercially successful artists from Finland, his career lasted from the late 1960s until his death in 2007. Sales of Kirka's records have exceeded one million copies. During his career, Kirka was awarded five Emma prizes.

Kirka's career spanned over four decades with hardly any interruptions. He started his career in 1964 in the band The Creatures, which never published any records. Previously associated with Ilkka Lipsanen's band, The Islanders, Kirka went on to record a wide array of rock and pop music. He went on a solo career in 1967 with his song "Hetki Lyö" (Beat the Clock) in the same year becoming his breakthrough. By the middle 1970s, several hits followed such as "Leijat" (Kites) and "Varrella virran" (Down by the River). His 1988 album Surun Pyyhit Silmistäni (The Sadness in Your Eyes) went on to be one of the best sold records in Finnish history. He also represented Finland in the Eurovision Song Contest 1984 with his song "Hengaillaan" (Hanging Around), with the album of the same name being awarded a gold record. From 1986 to 1987 Kirka published hard rock in English, but soon returned to schlagers in Finnish. In 1988 Kirka won the Syksyn sävel competition with his song "Surun Pyyhit Silmistäni" with the album of the same name being awarded five platinum records. Thus started the most successful part of Kirka's career with numerous gold and platinum records. By the start of the 21st century, Kirka was part of the popular Mestarit ("The Masters") group. His last album was published in 2005.

Kirka's career spanned many different kinds of music. When performing, he sang many rock and soul songs which were his favourite kinds, but his records mostly consisted of softer material. This contradiction sometimes bothered him, and he described himself as a rock singer who performed pop and schlager songs.

Kirka came from a Russo-Finnish background. Of the children in the Babitzin family, Sammy, Muska, Ykä and Anna have also made their careers in the music business. Kirka's daughter Alexandra has also appeared as a singer. Sammy's signature hit Daa-da daa-da tells a story of high-speed automotive cruising.

== Biography ==
=== Childhood and youth (1950 to 1966) ===
==== Background and family ====
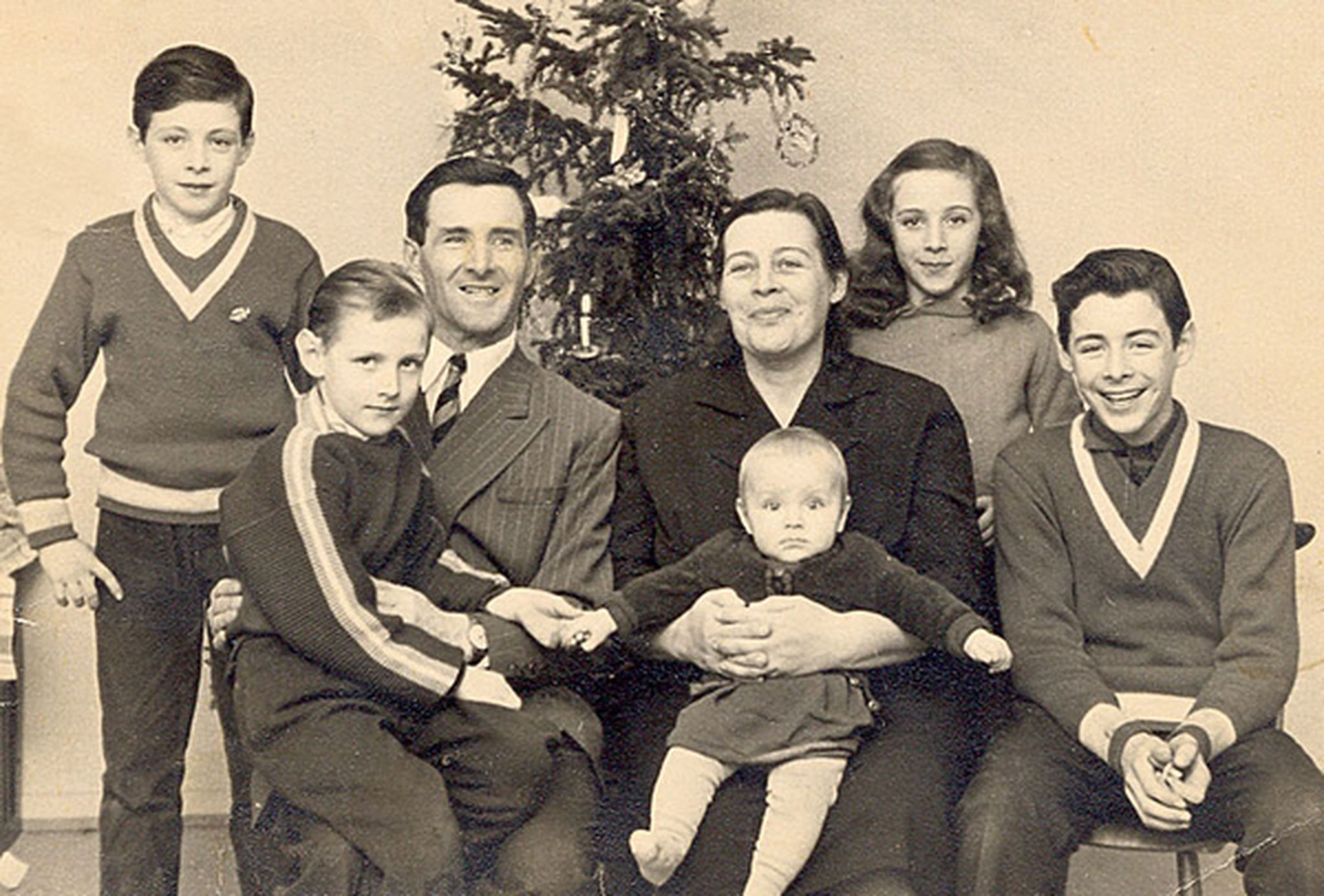
The Babitzin Family in the early 1960s at their apartment in Maunula in Helsinki. Kirka is standing to the left. The family's father Leo is holding Georgij ("Ykä") in his lap and the mother Elisabeth is holding Anna in her lap. In the background on the right is Marija ("Muska") and in the foreground on the right is Aleksandr ("Sammy").

Kirill Babitzin was born in Helsinki in 1950 to a Russian family. His father, Leo Babitzin was born in 1914 in St. Petersburg and fled to Finland in the aftermath of the October Revolution.

Kirill's mother, Elizaveta (née Zarubina), was partially of German-Russian descent and was born in a part of Karelia that Finland was later forced to cede to the Soviet Union. Elizaveta's father had been a commandant in the Russian Navy and committed suicide when the Bolsheviks came to fetch him. There had also been other officers of the Imperial Russian Army in the families of both of Kirka's parents.

Kirill Babitzin was born on 22 September 1950 in Helsinki as the third son of Leo who worked as a plumber and Elisabeth who was a stay-at-home mother. The family lived on the street Huvilakatu in a cramped room on the ground floor of the building. As well as Kirka, the Babitzin family included other children who also made a career in music: Aleksandr ("Sammy", 1948 - 1973), Marija ("Muska", born 1952), Georgij ("Ykä", born 1955) and Anna (born 1961) and Leo (1946-1948) who drowned when he was two years old. The family spoke Russian at home. The Russian names of the children were difficult to pronounce to their Finnish-speaking playmates, so they first started calling Kirill as Kira and then as Kirka. In 1961 the Babitzin family moved to Maunula to one of the new rented apartment buildings built at Pakilantie 20.

==== Start of musical interest and The Creatures ====
Kirill Babitzin first got into music at the age of five when his grandmother Sofia gave him an accordion, which he played on visits to senior homes. Leo Babitzin signed Kirka and Muska up for music lessons, but they quit going to them after becoming frustrated at the tight discipline held by the elderly teacher. In 1959 the nine-year-old Kirka started accordion school taught by Lasse Pihlajamaa. In the next year, Kirka took part in a televised accordion competition held at the Kulttuuritalo venue in Helsinki, where he was awarded the second prize in the regional championships for children under 12 years.

Kirka's interest in singing began at the age of eleven or twelve, when his big brother Sammy who worked as an errand boy at the Musiikki-Fazer music company started bringing records home with him. Kirka began listening to records by Elvis Presley and Paul Anka, and later also by The Beatles and The Rolling Stones. The raspy-voiced Little Richard proved to be the artist that made the biggest impression to Kirka, and this left a permanent effect on his style of singing. As Kirka started becoming interested in rock music he left his hobby of playing the accordion behind, and started learning to play the guitar instead.

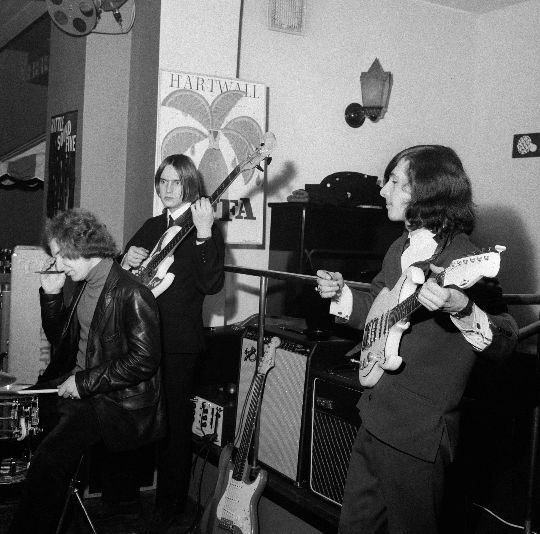
The band The Creatures in 1966. Kirka is to the right, while to the left is Remu Aaltonen on drums.

In autumn 1964 Kirka joined the band The Creatures as a singer. The band played straightforward rock and roll as well as rhythm and blues. The band would have wanted Sammy to join as a singer first, but he preferred to stay at his current band The Steelers and recommended his little brother Kirka instead. Kirka's first appearance with The Creatures was in November 1964 at the Vocational School for Girls in Helsinki. The band played many times on television and in the 1966 films Käpy selän alla and Topralli, but never published any records.

Kirka's father Leo Babitzin thought rock music was a passing phenomenon and insisted Kirka concentrate on his studies so he could get into university and graduate as an engineer, a doctor or a judge. Kirka had started school at a Russian-speaking playschool, from where he went on to the Tabunov school in 1957. The Tabunov school ceased operations in the next year, so Kirka moved to a primary school on the street Tehtaankatu. He just barely passed primary school, after which he started studying in a school on the street Mäkelänkatu. Kirka stopped going to school at seventh grade at Christmas time in 1966. He no longer enjoyed his time in a Finnish school but later said he felt fear towards its authoritativeness and leadership aimed at levelling the students. As well as this, Kirka was left behind in class a couple of times because of excessive absences. He got a grade 4 (failing grade) in singing, because he neglected his studies in singing in favour of playing at gigs. Even the child care authorities visited Kirka's home to remind him of compulsory education in Finland, and he was even threatened with ending up at an approved school. Under pressure from his father, Kirka applied to secondary school three times and was finally approved, but never actually showed up at the school.

=== Start of solo career (1967 to 1974) ===
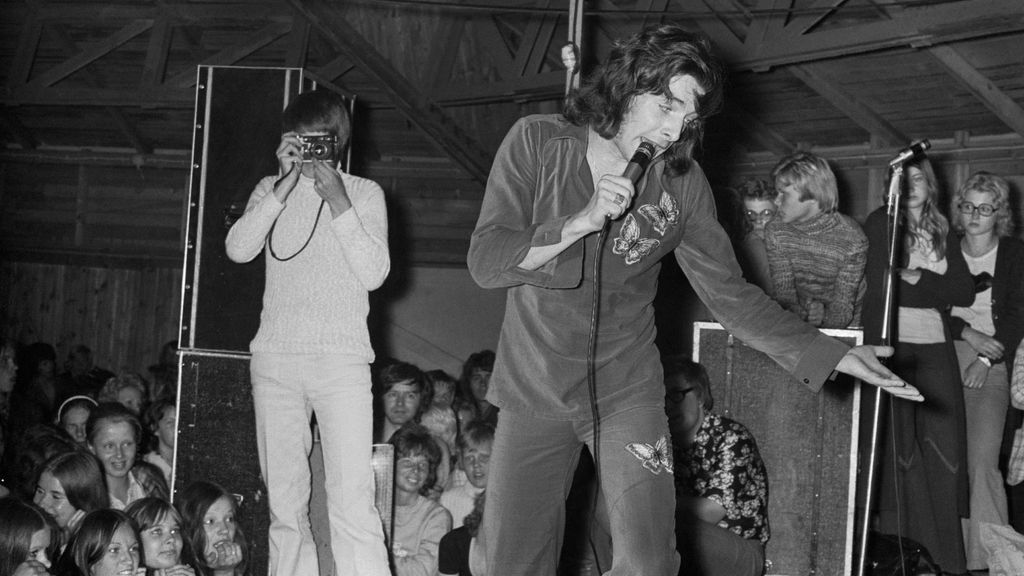
Kirka performing at Child in Time 2000 rock musical in Rajamäki, Nurmijärvi, Finland in 1971

==== First recordings and breakthrough ====
The band The Creatures had already started to wane, but Kirka's talent was recognised and he became popular. He visited a recording studio for the first time in summer 1967 when he recorded the songs "Anna suukko vain" ("Just give me a kiss") and "Silloin ihminen kaunis on" ("That's when you're beautiful") for Love Records. The songs, written and arranged by Otto Donner, combined jazz, blues and even elements of progressive rock, and the band Blues Section backed Kirka up. Love Records published the songs as a single later in the year after Kirka had already published his first hit "Hetki lyö" ("Beat the Clock", composed by Gottehrer-Stroll, a 1968 Elfstone B side), and the single attracted little attention. Kirka cited this song as his greatest achievement.

The Creatures performed for the last time in September 1967, after which Kirka spent a week or two as the singer of the band Mosaic. Danny was looking for another singer to his band The Islanders. Kari Åkerberg, who worked at the entertainment company D-tuotanto that Danny had founded, had seen Kirka performing with The Creatures and had become impressed by his voice. Kirka joined The Islanders and performed together with them for the first time in October 1967. At the same time, he joined the company D-tuotanto, where his raggare image was replaced with that of a clean pop singer. His wardrobe was well arranged and took influence of the British mod subculture. According to Kirka, the company sometimes went too far in arranging a style for him, which annoyed him. Kirka recorded what the record company recommended, toured Finland along with the others, dressed as he was told to and kept his personal romantic relationships secret as he was recommended to.

In October 1967 Kirka and The Islanders recorded the song "Hetki lyö" for the recording company Scandia-Musiikki, which was a cover of the song "Beat the Clock" by the American band The McCoys, translated to Finnish by Pertti Reponen. On the record, Kirka served as the singer of The Islanders, but the single was still published under the name The Islanders instead of Kirka. According to Danny, the reason was that he wanted to make a name for The Islanders so it could perform without a star singer if needed. The song "Hetki lyö" soon reached the top spot at the Kahdeksan kärjessä list on radio. After the single had been published, Kirka went on his first tour with The Islanders to Finnish Lapland.

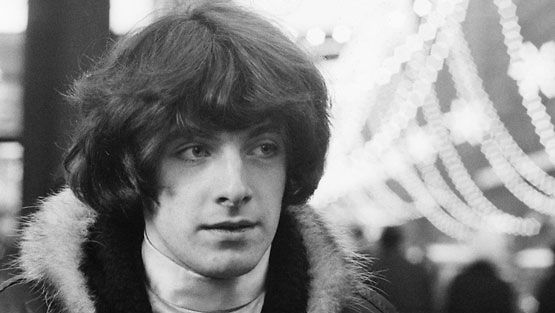
Kirka in 1968

In 1968 Kirka and The Islanders recorded the hits "Leijat" and "Ehkä suukon antaa saan" ("Maybe I can give you a kiss"). The latter was already published under the naem Kirka. Kirka and Danny also had a common summer show called Rock Side Story which broke a record in public attendance. This tour strengthened Kirka's position as a new star. In July 1968 he rose to the top spot at the list at the Stump magazine and stayed at the top spot until January 1970. Kirka was first flattered by the hysteria people felt towards him, but soon started to grow weary of it and even started to fear it. Fans got to know his home address and waited for him in the stairway and under the windows of his apartment. Kirka had to come up with secret passageways to get out of his home, and even then he could not openly appear in public. A new fan club was founded for Kirka, which was at first managed by his girlfriend from her home.

As well as the pop music heard on the record Kirka also sang rock and soul in English, and a lot of this material appears on his 1969 debut album Kirka keikalla. It was the first live album in Finland and quickly rose to the top spot on the list. In the summer Kirka held his first own summer tour Rock and Roll Circus. As was typical of D-tuotanto, the show reflected current events at the time, this time featuring the hippie culture and the musical Hair. Nevertheless, Rock and Roll Circus failed to reach the attendance record set by Rock Side Story. The song "Viimeiseen mieheen" ("Up to the last man") reached the top five on the list of most sold songs in 1969. The song "Pääsi rinnallein painuu" ("You put your head on my chest") also performed well. Both hits were included in the Christmas-time album Kirka, which was a collection of songs previously published as singles.

Kirka was exempt from conscription in 1969 because of stomach pains. He later admitted he had exaggerated his symptoms so the army would not have broken his promising career in music. In autumn in the same year Kirka bought an apartment on the street Vuorikummuntie in Konala, where he lived together with the singer Kristian.

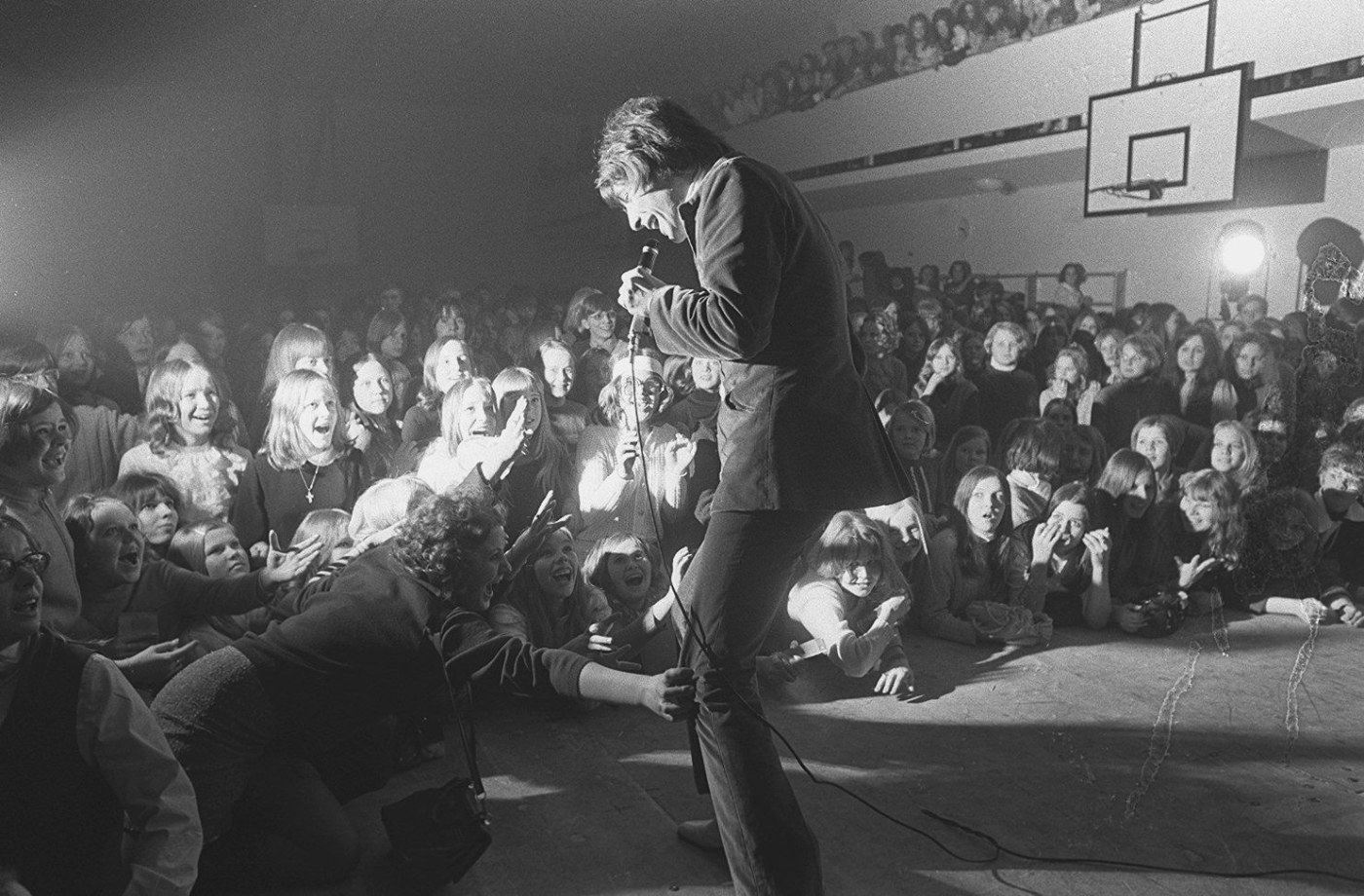
Kirka performing at a gymnastics hall in the 1960s

In the late 1960s and early 1970s Kirka's songs also appeared in films. The song "Avaruuslaulu" ("Space song") recorded for Love Records was heard in the film Vihreä leski which premiered in January 1968. Jörn Donner's 1969 film Sixtynine 69 features four of Kirka's songs. Kirka got his first real film role in the 1970 film Takiaispallo. The sex scenes between Kirka and actress Terhi Panula caused a controversy in advance, so they were cut from the final version by request from Panula's mother, actress Helena Haavisto. Kirka's fans were let down, as the initial controversy had led them to think Kirka and Panula would be starring in the film, while in reality the love relationship between the rebellious daughter of a work manager family and a gig musician had only been a minor side plot. As well as actually appearing in the film, Kirka also sang the songs "Saat kaiken" ("You'll get everything") and "Kaukainen valo" ("The distant light") arranged by Eero Koivistoinen.

==== Establishment of success ====
Kirka's most successful songs of the early 1970s were "Venus" and "Kulman kundit" ("The guys from around the block") as well as the cover songs from Simon & Garfunkel "Mrs. Robinson" and "Lilja, ruusu ja kirsikkapuu" ("The lily, the rose and the cherry tree") he recorded together with his brother Sammy. Other hits of the period included "Silta yli synkän virran" ("A bridge over dark water") and the greatest hit "Mamy Blue" which rose to second place on the list in 1971. Kirka published his first studio album Saat kaiken in spring in the same year, which was a mix of singles from the previous year and new material. Kirka was getting bothered with recording songs in an old-fashioned Finnish way. The album arose a conversation of songs Kirka recorded on his albums.

Kirka's own summer shows continued in the early 1970s. The "Kesäleikki" show of 1971 received much criticism both from newspapers and from youth magazines. It was seen as difficult to understand, heavy and message-driven, and people thought Kirka did not get to represent his greatest strength as a singer wooing the public.

On Midsummer 1971 Kirka went on a tour together with Lasse Mårtenson and Esko Linnavalli on a light aircraft. In the middle of the flight the plane went into a thunderstorm and its engine stopped. The plane managed to make an emergency landing onto a lake. A group of soldiers from the Finnish Air Force and the fire brigade arrived to receive the plane. The artists survived the situation and got to continue their journey in a police escort to their concert site in Punkalaidun, where they arrived significantly late.

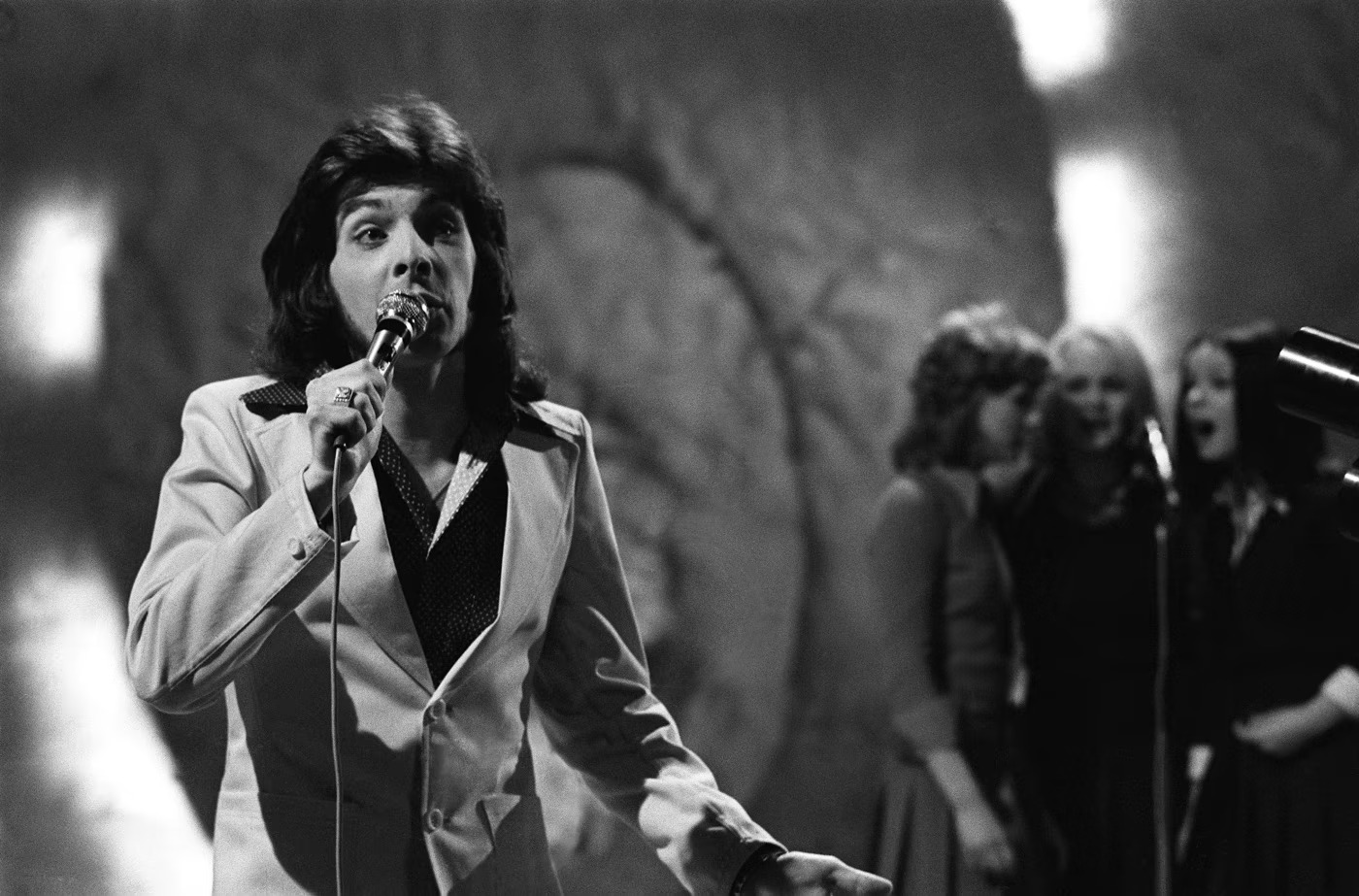
Kirka performing at the Finnish competition for the Eurovision Song Contest 1972

In January 1972 Kirka took part in the Finnish competition for the Eurovision Song Contest for the first time. His song "Kaikkea on" ("We've got everything") arranged by Erik Lindström and written by Saukki got third place. In the same year Kirka published his more ambitious album Nykyaikaa, where he attempted to narrow the difference in material between his live performances and his albums. Instead of the studio musicians on his previous albums, the album features rock musicians from bands such as Tasavallan Presidentti and Pepe & Paradise. The album features translated cover songs, such as "Kanelipuun alla" ("Cinnamon Girl" by Neil Young) and "Maggie May" (by Rod Stewart) as well as altogether new songs arranged by Frank Robson, Jukka Tolonen and Rauli Badding Somerjoki. Some of the critics praised the album while fans took a distance to it. Of Kirka's singles in 1972, the only one to reach the charts even for a moment was "Pikku veli" ("Little brother"). Regardless of lower record sales Kirka won the Grand Prix vote at the Suosikki magazine for the most popular Finnish singer of the year.

In 1973, after a small break, Kirka made a big hit with his song "Varrella virran" ("Down by the river") which is featured on the album Rautaa ja kettinkiä. It mostly features cover songs from bands such as Slade, Alice Cooper and Neil Young. Kirka's six-year career with Scandia-Musiikki ended in 1973.

In the 1974 Finnish competition for the Eurovision Song Contest Kirka took part with the song "Energia" ("Energy") written by Rauno Lehtinen, which was about the 1973 oil crisis. In a preliminary review it was even considered a favourite of its own competition. However, the song dropped out of the finals after the Helsinki jury gave it a poor score.

=== Years of change and popularity waning (1974 to 1980) ===
==== New record company, program office and musical style ====
The middle 1970s were a time of independence for Kirka. He started recording material he liked himself and moved to a different program office and record company. Together with many other artists, Kirka left D-tuotanto in 1974 and joined a new program office called Viihde Polar Oy founded by Matti Lingman and Kalle Kansa. As a monthly salaried employee of D-tuotanto, Kirka had felt he was missing out on a proper compensation from the ticket sales of his performances. Differences of opinion about recording contracts had also influenced his departure. Kirka had stopped recording for Scandia-Musiikki and made a new recording contract with the Delta record label of the recording company Finndisc which was in close cooperation with D-tuotanto. Kirka recorded the single "Energia" for Delta, after which he waited to get to record a new album, in vain. He then approached the management board of the record company EMI directly, on whose recommendation Kirka again switched to a new record company and thus abandoned recording for D-tuotanto.

Already in 1971 Kirka had started rebelling against his own recording material. Kassu Halonen, the keyboard player at The Islanders, had a part in this, who according to Kirka was "his first soulmate in music". Kirka now moved closer to funk and soul on his records. His first album recorded for EMI was Tiukka linja, published in early 1975. On the record Kirka sings soul, reggae and rock music originally performed by artists such as Stevie Wonder, Bob Marley and Bad Company. On the record, Kirka is accompanied by the band The Islanders led by Kassu Halonen and more numerous than before, also including horns players. Critics praised the band and the song selection on the record, but sales remained low.

In early 1975 Kirka was present at the Finnish competition for the Eurovision Song Contest with the son "Oh New York, rakkain" written by Carita Holmström and arranged by Raul Reiman. The song, which combined soul and funk, made it to the finals and got fifth place. After Eurovision Kirka represented Finland at the Sopot International Song Festival with the two-year-old song "Varrella virran". Kirka's second album in 1975 was Babitzinit konsertissa, where the Babitzin siblings Kirka, Muska, Ykä and Anna all performed together for the first time. The album was a tribute to their brother Sammy Babitzin who had died in a car accident, recorded at the Finlandia Hall. The album failed to reach the charts. Only the duet "Silloin" ("Then"), which Kirka recorded together with Marion Rung as a cover of the Italian Eurovision song "Era", reached the charts in 1975.

The album Lauantaiyö recorded in Stockholm continued Kirka's more ambitious style started by Tiukka linja. Compared to the soul-inspired previous album Lauantaiyö was more diverse: it had deep songs arranged by Kassu Halonen, rearranged old rock songs, jazz songs, light rock and ballads. Kirka had used the soul song "Mirella" on the album to participate at the Syksyn sävel competition and got eighth place, which was the third from last. The albuim Lauantaiyö also sold poorly. It was Kirka's only publication in 1976, and he did not publish any singles in that year. Kirka again took part in the Finnish competition for the Eurovision Song Contest, this time with the song "Neidonryöstö" ("Robbing the maiden") written by Jukka Siikavire and arranged by Erkki Mäkinen, which got fourth place. He also used the song to participate at the Intervision Song Contest. Kirka's popularity was waning. His records sold worse than before, and at the annual Grand Prix charts in the Suosikki magazine where had previously regularly reached the top of the chart, he now fell to place 13.

In spring 1976 Kirka married Kirsti Mikkola at the Church of the Holy Trinity in Lahti. They had met in 1971 when Mikkola had appeared as a dancing girl on Kirka's Kesäleikki tour. At the wedding Mikkola was pregnant, and their first-born child was born in October in the same year. The couple had four children, of which Alexandra (born 1981) has also appeared as a singer.

Kirka's financial situation had remained stable for as long as he had been employed at D-tuotanto, which had taken care of the financial matters for him. In contrast, the company Viihde Polar which Kirka had next been part of had embezzled performance compensation for a worth of thousands of markka. To solve his problems, Kirka founded a Kommanditgesellschaft on the advice from a layer in 1975, but the tax officials saw it as tax evasion, which led Kirka to a series of debt lasting almost two decades. At his worst, he was 1.8 million markka in debt and still had to support a family. To cut down on his debt, he had to sell his apartment in Konala in 1975, which according to Kirka did not help the situation, because Viihde Polar kept selling him on gigs on prices which left nothing for him. After selling his apartment, Kirka's family first moved to Lahti at Mikkola's parents, after which they got a rented apartment at the house of the Helsinki Orthodox Congregation in Kruununhaka. A bank manager helped Kirka by granting him a large loan.

==== Move to Finndisc ====
Kirka's record contract with EMI ended with the album Lauantaiyö. He next recorded for Finndisc, which published the 1977 album Kaksi puolta. This album included a lot of cover material, from performers such as Eagles, 10cc, Procol Harum and Steve Miller Band. Its musical style is light rock and true to its title ("Two sides") it contains both speedy and soft material.. On the record Kirka is backed by the band Kaseva. Despite the intricate work that went to the album, it too performed poorly and failed to become a hit. Kirka also failed to attract the same amounts of public to his live shows in the summer. In 1977 he took part in the Intervision Song Contest in Sopot, Poland with the song "Neidonryöstö" he had previously used to apply to the Eurovision Song Contest, but it failed to reach the top spot. At the same time, Kirka and his backing band The Islanders ended their long-time cooperation.

In 1978 Kirka was touring and recording together with his sister Anna Babitzin, and they published the album Anna & Kirka together. The duo's song "Sinut haluan vain" ("I only want you"), a cover of John Travolta's and Olivia Newton-John's song "You're the One That I Want", was a success. The duet "Cindy" also reached the charts. Kirka and Anna toured together for the rest of the 1970s, and continued to cooperate in the Finnish competition for the Eurovision Song Contest 1979, where their song "Aikuiset anteeksi antaa" ("Grown-ups forgive") together with their sister Muska reached fourth place.

In the late 1970s and early 1980s Kirka toured together with Vicky Rosti in the summer. The first of these tours was the sketch-like Drive in Happy Days Bar in 1979, based on the American television series Happy Days and built around its background music. This was followed by the Sirkus Jamboree tour in summer 1980, but the tours failed to reach similar amounts of public as in the previous years. According to Kirka, he was left 160 thousand markka in debt from these two tours.

In 1980 Kirka was also present at the Finnish competition for the Eurovision Song Contest, when he and the band Silhuetit performed the song "Karthago" arranged by Antti Hyvärinen and written by Juice Leskinen. It became a preliminary favourite but still lost to the song Huilumies by Vesa-Matti Loiri.

=== Recordings for CBS and performances at restaurants (1980 to 1985) ===
The Finnish stage culture started to wane from the late 1970s to the early 1980s, which cut down on Kirka's work. As well as that, new artists had risen to the popularity among the youth, and more experienced performers such as Kirka started to move to perform at restaurants. Kirka's first restaurant show was "Lankkumaakari K. Babitzin" in spring 1980s. Kirka did not enjoy his time at restaurants and disliked the music he had to play there. His backing bands varied, and Kirka had no respect for them. He also switched his record company to CBS, which gave him recording material he disliked. Kirka later described moving to CBS and restaurants as the biggest mistake in his life.

CBS guided Kirka's career more and more towards schlagers. In 1981 CBSD published the studio album Kirka produced by Antti Hyvärinen. The record, consisting mostly of traditional schlagers, did not appeal to Kirka, who later described it as his all-time worst. The album also contains the song "Kyyneleet" ("Tears") which Kirka hated and was the only one of his songs he refused to perform. According to Hans Rautio from CBS the album sold 8 to 10 thousand copies, which the company was satisfied with. Also the songs "Kyyneleet" and "Tuo tyttö on mun" ("That girl is mine") were popular at jukeboxes and added to the demand for Kirka's gigs. Kirka participated in the Syksyn sävel competition with the song "Amen" from the album, where it was placed sixth of ten.

Kirka was a visiting artist on the 1982 album Moottorilinnut by the heavy metal band Kimmo Kuusniemi Band. On the album, Kirka sings on the songs "1000 megawatin totuus" ("The truth of 1000 megawatts") and "Veistoksen ajatuksia" ("Thoughts of the sculpture") which are among the roughest heavy metal music songs he had performed.

As time went by, Kirka grew bored of his married life and started seeking extramarital relationships. His relationship with his wife had grown cold, and according to Kirka they did not even have the time to take care of their relationship and sort out things between them. The troubles Kirka's financial distress gave him also affected the state of his marriage. In 1982 Kirka had an extramarital daughter. Kirka paid for the child support but did not seek custody. Kirka kept the existence of his daughter secret from his wife for years.

At the Finnish competition for the Eurovision Song Contest 1983 Kirka was present with three songs. Of these, the song "Täytyy uskaltaa" ("I have to dare") written by Kassu Halonen and Kristian "Kisu" Jernström fared the best, reaching second place.. Kirka also published an album called Täytyy uskaltaa. It was built around the songs at the competition for the Eurovision Song Contest, and they were backed up with cover songs of a more rock and roll style than on the previous album, and Kirka liked these cover songs more. Täytyy uskaltaa was Kirka's first album to reach the charts in ten years.

Kirka's eighth attempt at the Finnish competition for the Eurovision Song Contest was finally a success in 1984 when the song "Hengaillaan" arranged by Jukka Siikavire and written by Jussi Tuominen was chosen as Finland's entry to the Eurovision Song Contest in Luxembourg. It got ninth place at the finals, which was Finland's best ranking since 1975. In the spring, the song was also popular on Finnish charts. The trip to the contest left a bad taste in Kirka's mouth because the arguments he had with Yleisradio and CBS. The album Hengaillaan got Kirka his first gold record. It was in a more clear schlarger style and included a better balance of new and borrowed songs than his previous albums.

Kirka's last album published by CBS, Älä sano ei, was published in 1985. One of its most popular songs is "Kahden hullun matka" ("The journey of two madmen") by Esa Kaartamo, and the cover songs on the album were African-American disco pop. Despite its considerable radio popularit the album sold clearly less than its predecessor Hengaillaan, even though it did reach the charts.,

Kirka's career started rising again at CBS, but even this success did not cause him to enjoy his time at the company. Kirka's contract would still have required one more album, but Kirka left the company because of disputes over royalty payments. The dispute was over a minor sum and also otherwise controversial, but the management at CBS refused to take the potential breach of contract to court.

=== Flamingo years (1986 to 1994) ===
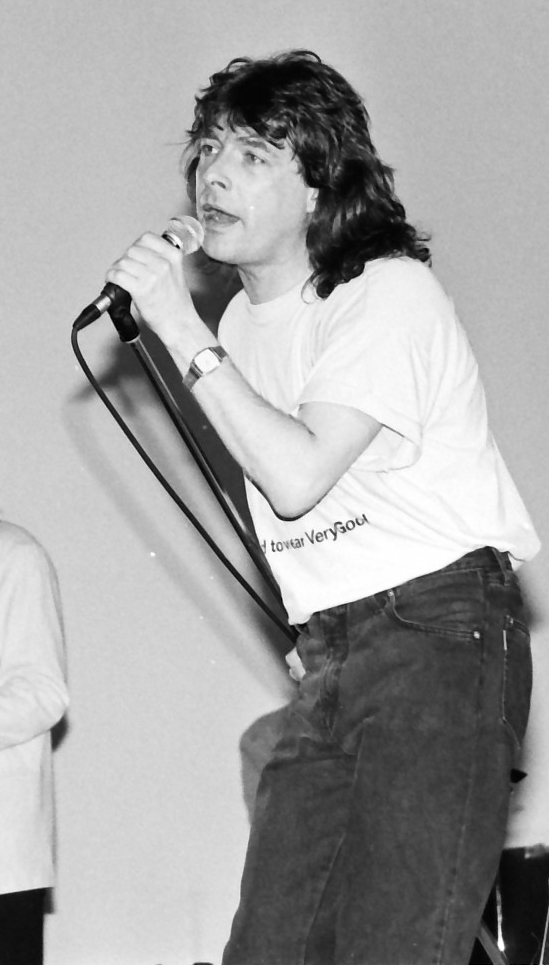
Kirka in 1989

==== Return to roots with rock albums ====
In the middle 1980s, Kirka joined the record company Flamingo Records managed by Kassu Halonen, Kisu Jernström and Vexi Salmi. Kirka's first publication with Flamingo was a single, both of whose songs he used at the Finnish competition for the Eurovision Song Contest 1986. The song "Uusiin taivaisiin" ("Into new heavens") written by Edu Kettunen got second place and lost to Kari Kuivalainen's "Päivä kahden ihmisen" ("A day for two people") by a single point.

The short period that began with the album R.O.C.K. was Kirka's favourite time of his career -- He got the return to his roots, to the good old rough and tough stuff.
- Kassu Halonen

Kirka had joined Flamingo on the condition that he could get to record at least one rock album in English. The management at the record company had been planning a different kind of music for Kirka and thought the change of style was a commercial risk, but ended up agreeing anyway. This fulfilled Kirka's long-time dream of making international-level rock music in Finland.

The 1986 hard rock album R.O.C.K. sold for gold. In addition to the songs by Kettunen, Halonen and Jernström it had two cover songs, "Born to Be Wild" and "School's Out". The album revived Kirka's career, but most prominently the young critics had a more reserved view of it than the public. A few months before the release of the album itself the single "Born to Be Wild" sold well and it won the Levyraati contest. Along with his new music, Kirka also changed his outside appearance to more along the lines of the heavy metal subculture. His appearance became more self-confident, and he changed his clean-cut hair to a heavy metal hairdo and his clothes into black leather. The new music brought new, younger public to Kirka, but at the same time, his older fans left him.

The popularity of Kirka's heavy rock started to wane in 1987, but he was allowed to record another album in the same style, titled The Spell. This album, consisting entirely of songs by Halonen and Jernström, was even rougher in style than its predecessor, drawing impression from the glam metal bands of the period. The Spell quickly dropped off the charts, and its songs were not popular on the radio. Kirka got fewer and fewer gigs, partly because the loud music featured on his last two albums was difficult to play at restaurants.

Kirka did not write his own songs, so the most of his income came from performance compensation instead of record sales. As his gigs grew fewer, his financial situation got significantly worse. He was also distressed by the fact that he had finally got to play the music he loved after his troubles with CBS only to lose the chance again. As well as problems with his employment and money, he was troubled by his marriage falling apart. Weary of everything, Kirka considered quitting his career as a singer. In early 1988 Kirka had to seek help from the social security bureau when he got hit with an additional tax of a million and a half markka.

==== Peak popularity years ====
In 1988 Kirka moved back to Finnish schlagers and rose to the peak of his popularity after winning the Syksyn sävel competition with his song "Surun pyyhit silmistäni" ("You wipe the sorrow from my eyes"), a melancholic pop-schlager, which proved to be his greatest chart success. Kirka had been reluctant to change his style and did not originally even want to record the song. Nevertheless, it became one of Kirka's most successful songs, which rose to the top of the charts. The album with the same name sold for five times the number granting a platinum record, and it was the best-selling album in Finland for a long time, until it was beaten by Jari Sillanpää's debut album in the 1990s. The song represented a financial breakthrough for Kirka, and he paid off his tax debt in autumn 1993.

The 1989 album Anna käsi sold for double platinum. The album, consisting entirely of songs written by Halonen, Jernström and Salmi, continued in the schlager style. Kirka's performances started to concentrate on concert halls and sports events, and he published a concert video named Surun pyyhit silmistäni.

In 1990 Kirka performed at the World Music Awards gala in Monaco, where the best-selling artists from the previous year from all around the world had been invited to. The broadcast of the show was followed by over 200 million viewers. Kirka's English translation of his song "Surun pyyhit silmistäni", titled "Sadness in Your Eyes", was selected onto the album composed from the gala. In 1991 Kirka returned to Monaco because of the success of the album Anna käsi. This time he performed the song "Kauneimmat lauseet" ("The most beautiful phrases"), translated to English as "Cry in My Arms".

Kirka's 1990 album Ota lähellesi sold for platinum, followed by the 1991 album Kasvot peilissä which sold for gold. The 1990 album Parhaat, uudet versiot, consisting of re-recordings of Kirka's old hits, true to its name "The best, new version", also sold for gold. Kirka's 1992 album Pyydä vain again also sold for gold. Despite the huge sales of the albums none of their songs became hits. As well as that, Kirka felt his music had become repetitive, and during the publication of the album Kasvot peilissä Kirka publicly claimed the songs arranged by Kassu Halonen and Kisu Jernström were boring and soulless. Kirka also often argued with Vexi Salmi wishing he would write about other things than "sorrow and tears". However, Kassu Halonen has said that the music was based on the quest for quality and songs fit for Kirka, which Kirka had approved himself.

The song "Sadness in Your Eyes", written by Kisu Jernström appreciating the international market, was also popular abroad. In spring 1991, it was translated to Japanese and performed by Hironobu Nomura, and a while later it was also successfully recorded translated to Cantonese and Mandarin. The song "Sadness in Your Eyes" performed by Kirka himself was broadcast on the radio in Thessaloniki in Greece. Kirka was invited to Thessaloniki to perform the song in a gala in February 1992. Kirka was invited to Greece again in June, this time in Athens, where he held a four-day promotion tour performing and giving interviews. Despite the popularity on the radio and on gigs Kirka failed to make a real breakthrough, as it would have required even more work. In 1993 the English-language album Sadness in Your Eyes was published in Greece, consisting of English translations of Kirka's successful period at Flamingo Records.

Kirka divorced Kirsti Mikkola in 1992 and married the stewardess Paula Nummela. Nummela, who lived in the same neighbourhood, was Mikkola's best friend, and Kirka had also known her for 16 years. Nummela was pregnant but had a miscarriage in 1994, and she and Kirka never got the common child they had wanted.

Kirka's success continued with his 1994 album Kirka which was his last album at Flamingo Records and sold for gold. The ideas of Kirka's long-time songwriter trio of Halonen, Jernström and Salmi had started to diminish. Jernström has admitted that he had grown weary of the huge amount of work at the record company and he felt bad at writing bad songs for Kirka. Flamingo Records ceased operations in 1995, at which time Kirka was no longer employed at the record company.

=== New record contract (1995 to 2006) ===
==== BMG Rights Management and Mestarit ====
After Flamingo Records, Kirka was in negotiations with a few other record companies, and in 1995 he made a new record contract with BMG Rights Management. His first publication at BMG was "Den glider in", recorded together with the Finland men's national ice hockey team who had won the World Championships at ice hockey. The single sold over seven thousand copies and part of its profits were given to charity for the junior ice hockey players. In the next year, Kirka published the album Tie huomiseen, where he wanted to get rid of his schlager image, and thanks to new young composers he got to made fresh and different music that he had wanted to. The album introduced a new electronic music sound for Kirka. Tie huomiseen immediately sold for gold and then sold for platinum in 2000. Kirka's gigs still attracted large audiences, even though his repertoire had remained the same for a long time. On the song "Toukokuu" ("The month of May") Kirka took part at the Finnish competition for the Eurovision Song Contest for the last time and got third place. From 1972 and 1996 he had applied for the Eurovision Song Contest with twenty-two songs, which was more than any other Finnish artist ever.

In 1997 Kirka celebrated the 30th anniversary of his career and went on a tour of 56 concerts all over Finland. In the same year he published a compilation album Hetki lyö spanning his entire career, which sold for platinum. The album included the song "Daa-da daa-da" originally recorded by Kirka's brother Sammy who had died almost twenty-five years before, which Kirka used electronic techniques to sing together with Sammy. It became the biggest hit on the compilation. A music video of the song was also published, where Kirka again used electronic techniques to appear together with Sammy on the video Sammy had originally appeared alone on in the 1970s.

In October 1998, Kirka, Pepe Willberg, Pave Maijanen and Hector held a common concert called "Mestarit" ("The Masters") at the Hartwall Arena, which was recorded and televised. The concert became very popular and it was followed by a tour of performances which all sold out. The album Mestarit Areenalla recorded live in the concert sold for triple platinum and was the best-selling Finnish album in Finland in 1999. In early 1999 there was also another Mestarit tour which was almost sold out, culminating at the fully booked Helsinki Olympic Stadium in August. Kirka was also supposed to appear at the "Pojat" ("The Boys") tour together with Danny and Markku Aro in the early 21st century, but he resigned from the tour before it began.

In June 1999 Kirka published the single "Liian monta" ("Too many") on his own initiative. The profits from the single were completely donated to the disaster fund of the Finnish Red Cross to help refugees from the Kosovo War.

==== Last publications ====
Kirka turned 50 years old on 22 September 2000. On his birthday he founded the Kirill Babitzin Foundation, whose aim was to improve and support musical training and hobbies for children. During Kirka's lifetime it brought sound playback devices and musical instruments to kindergartens. Kirka also published his 25th studio album Suuri hetki on his birthday. The album, produced by Kassu Halonen and Juha Björninen, spent almost a year in production, and it was meant to be a crown to Kirka's career. The album was also accompanied by a large concert tour. Kirka's records failed to sell as well as during his peak popularity. Suuri hetki reached tenth place on the charts and failed to sell for gold.

The album Sinut siinä nään was published in autumn 2002. The music journalists selected it as the album of the month, and it was a nominee for the schlager album of the year at the Emma gala in the same year. In 2002 Kirka was also active in anti-drug work by participating in the "Katkolla tulevaisuus" project. At the same time, the drug problems of Kirka's son were debated publicly. The arguments between Kirka and his extramarital daughter about her support costs also attracted attention. The negative publicity had no impact on the popularity of Kirka's gigs.

Kirka's last studio album Elämääni eksynyt was published in 2005. Even Kirka himself did not expect the album to be a great success, and it only reached 26th place on the charts. In addition, the album had to be withdrawn because of controversy over publication rights of the song "Muistoja, muistoja vain", a cover of the song "Wonderful Life".

In 2006 Kirka appeared together with Taiska on the "Kahden hullun matka" tour.

=== Death (2007) ===
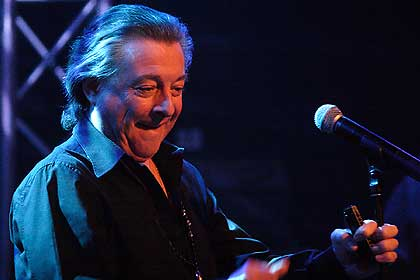
Kirka at one of his last gigs at the restaurant Foxia in Oulu on 19 January 2007

An appearance at the restaurant Lux in Helsinki on Thursday 25 January 2007 proved to be Kirka's last public concert. He died at his home in Helsinki on 31 January 2007 at 01:30 in the night of an aortic aneurysm. During the months before his death Kirka had felt very tired and sickly and had suffered from a rotavirus infection in December. He had visited the doctor to check on his health, for the last time five days before his death, but he was not sent to hospital. Kirka's sister Muska has said that before Kirka's death his rib cage had been unnaturally swollen. The singer Kari Tapio also said Kirka had been tired and had complained about a swelling.

Kirka was buried on 2 February at the Helsinki Orthodox Cemetery at the Babitzin family grave where his father Leo and his brothers Sammy and Leo had also been buried. Kirka was blessed by his friend Mitro Repo. His memorial service was held on 10 March at the Uspenski Cathedral. Not all of the guests could fit inside, so loudspeakers were placed outside the church so people could follow the service.

Kirka was supposed to participate at the Tanssii tähtien kanssa show in spring 2007 but died just before shooting began. On the last day of his life he had to skip practice because he was not feeling well. At the end of his life he had been planning a heavy metal record together with famous Finnish rock and metal musicians and had asked Timo Tolkki from Stratovarius to cooperate on the album. On Tolkki's suggestion they had started planning an album titled Elämäni, which would have been a compilation of Kirka's life.

After Kirka's death, Warner Music Finland published a memorial album called Kaikki parhaat 1967 - 2007 in March 2007 and all of Kirka's albums from 1969 to 1978 on CD for the first time. The compilation sold for gold. In August 2025 Sony Music published Kirka's song "Lady tää on elämää", which was recorded in 1983 but had been left unpublished.

Kirka's memorial concert was held on 14 February 2008 at the Hartwall Arena. It was videotaped and later televised, and its profits were donated to the Kirill Babitzin Foundation. Kirka's widow Paula Nummela said the concert gave the start to found the Kirill Babitzin School of Music in Kruununhaka. However, nothing became of this plan. In 2010 a Valentine's Day concert for the Kirill Babitzin Foundation was held at the Savoy Theatre in Helsinki. The foundation ceased operations in 2012, and the Finnish Patent Office found actions in violation of the foundation law from its bookkeeping. The Helsinki District Court shut the foundation down in 2018.

== Artist image ==
=== Music ===
Throughout his career, Kirka performed many different kinds of music, and his style of music was nearly constantly changing. He started by singing rautalanka music together with rough and tough rock and roll, from which he moved on to beat music. There he continued to soul music with influences from psychedelic rock and jazz. Kirka also performed funk, disco, heavy metal and most importantly schlagers. At the end of his career he also recorded some electronic music.

Kirka's own personal taste in music included heavy rock and soul. For a long time, he was troubled by the contrast between his live performances and his records: at live performances, he sang rock, soul and rhythm and blues, but on his records he was a pop and schlager singer as well as an entertainer who had moved to Finnish material. The reason for this was pressure from record companies to appease the taste of the Finnish public. In the 1970s Kirka rid himself of the pressure from the record companies in order to record more music he liked himself. However, in the early 1980s his music became more inclined to schlagers because of commercial purposes, where the biggest fans of his rock music accused him of being a traitor who had sold his soul. Later in the 1980s he published two hard rock albums but was troubled with financial difficulties.

For myself, I have accepted the realities required in this business - if you want to support yourself and your family, you must not keep banging your head on the wall. You have to make the kind of music that finds its audience, but that doesn't mean you have to sell your soul, you can keep on making the music you love yourself at live performances. This is not calculation, but facing and accepting the facts.
- Kirka

In 1988 Kirka recorded his success song "Surun pyyhit silmistäni" which eased his financial difficulties, but he found out he still wanted to sing rock music instead of schlagers. Following the same "crossover schlager" recipe he recorded other albums aimed for the baby boomers. Typical themes of these schlager albums from the Flamingo Music years (1988 to 1994) were feelings, longing, staying for the night with your loved one and common dreams. According to Vexi Salmi who had written the songs, these songs were targeted towards middle-aged women disappointed with their love life. Kirka's last albums published by BMG Rights Management, Suuri hetki (2000), Sinut siinä nään (2002) and Elämääni eksynyt (2005) played it safe. These albums contained mostly radio-friendly light schlagers and their themes were again targeted at middle-aged people.

Kirka himself described his music as melodic rock schlagers and said he was a rock singer performing pop and schlagers. According to journalist Jukka Lindfors Kirka's career can be concentrated in three songs: "Hetki lyö" was his breakthrough, "Born to Be Wild" was his rock trademark and "Surun pyyhit silmistäni" started his career into a new rise.

Save for a few exceptions, Kirka did not write or arrange his own songs, but was most prominently an interpreter for existing music. The only songs he had a hand in composing were "Luokseni jää" ("Stay with me"), "Tunteet meitä pyörittää" ("We are spun around by feelings") as well as "Baby, I Need You" from his time at The Creatures.

=== Singer and performer ===
Kirka was very diverse in his singing, and his voice was raspy. He drew inspiration in his singing style from Little Richard. At the start of his career, his voice was compared to Little Richard as well as Ray Charles and most prominently James Brown. When the performance manager and voice director Reino Bäckman heard the young Kirka sing, he was very critical of his use of his voice. Already at the start of his career, Kirka was different from pop singers such as Danny and Johnny Liebkind in that he sang as strongly on his records as on his gigs. From the beginning, he drew criticism in the music circles. According to Vesa Kurkela from the Sibelius Academy Kirka's style of singing was so personal and difficult to use that for decades, he had no imitators. Kirka did not take singing lessons, because he wanted to protect his voice from outside influence. In the late 1960s and early 1970s he took a few lessons from Ture Ara, who taught him to breathe properly.

According to Kisu Jernström, Kirka's singing was at his best during the album R.O.C.K. (1986) when he managed to sing some quite difficult songs. On the album The Spell (1987) Kirka sings some songs unusually high for a male singer and sometimes reaches a high C or even a high D. On the 1996 album Tie huomiseen he sometimes sang a little lower than usual, and Petri Lahti mentions his voice sounded more relaxed and less nasal. Kirka himself thought that his new voice was the result of quitting smoking and an operation on his maxillary sinuses.

Danny has said that Kirka's understanding of rhythm was amazingly good for a Nordic singer. Because of his extremely flexible voice he could sing ballads, soul and gospel music. Danny also mentions that contrary to the mainstream at the time Kirka was not content with schlagers but instead of had the courage and the sense of style to choose a career that also included pop and rock.

According to Danny, Kirka could have had a career abroad, if some international manager would have understood his gift. Also according to Kisu Jernström, Kirka's voice, appearance and social character would have sufficed for an international career, as was the case in Greece. According to Petri Lahti, Kirka's skills at searching for and finding enough feeling for the song he sang was exceptional for a Finnish singer.

According to Pave Maijanen, Kirka's friendly character and personality were his strengths as a singer. Maijanen believes that these characteristics were present in him as a performer, which was a huge reason for his success. According to Kassu Halonen, Kirka always gave everything he had got when performing regardless of the size of the audience. Lasse Norres believes Kirka got this type of thinking from his former band member Remu Aaltonen.

Kirka's active career of live performances spanned over four decades, almost without interruptions. His characteristics as a singer did not always come forward on his records, which is why already at the start of his career, he got a reputation of an interpreter that one must not only listen to but also see in person. Kirka's performances were well planned in advance, down to his speeches between his songs, so he was very cautious of changing his performance concept. According to Seppo Kahilainen who managed Kirka's performances, Kirka was very thorough, but also wanted a lot from the others and wanted that everything went well. Kirka was very strict about sound playback. On his performances, Kirka sometimes forgot the lyrics to his songs.

== Personal image ==
=== Persona ===
Kirka was timid, shy and gentle. However, he was a protegé of the stars. For some reason the same happened to him as well as many other royal artists that the black angel took the hero of the day away. (Note: The last sentence is a reference to the lyrics of the song Lasten mehuhetki by Tuomari Nurmio.)
- Remu Aaltonen, Kirka's band mate from the 1960s.

People who knew Kirka have described him as gentle and polite. For example Pave Maijanen has said Kirka was an eternal rascal and possibly the friendliest person he had ever met. Because of his gentleness, Kirka sometimes signed bad contracts and did not look after his own interests.

Already in his childhood Kirka avoided conflicts and sought to clear arguments even between other people. He later expressed harsh criticism towards the record company CBS, but according to Hans Rautio who was responsible for the company's operations in Finland, they were always on good terms with Kirka. His departure from CBS came as a complete surprise to the company. In August 1990, the magazine Suomen Kuvalehti published an article called "Taitelijan helvetti" ("The artist's hell") about Kirka's financial troubles, where he expressed harsh criticism towards various entities. This was so unusual of Kirka that it became a talking point for a long time.

Kirka's second wife Paula Nummela has described him as a person difficult to get close to, and who had difficulties to reveal the true, more serious side of himself, which he hid beneath his cheerful role. According to Nummela, Kirka had a soul life it took her twenty years to learn. Kirka's sister Muska has said that Kirka worked too much and did not agree to her suggestions about his gigs. Also Kassu Halonen has mentioned Kirka's devotion to his work and that he could not stay away from gigs for more than two weeks. Kirka was already active in his childhood, but more level-headed than his big brother Sammy, and he had a tendency to withdraw to his own devices to think.

According to Lasse Norres, Kirka was modest and even shy. He helped others, but sometimes burned himself out. Nevertheless, he never gave up. Norres noticed that Kirka behaved cheerfully even when his career was going downwards and his finances were in a crisis. On the other hand, Norres has said that Kirka worried about people close to him and sometimes his selflessness burned him out.

Kirka has said that he never had a role or image, because right from the start he found out that he was not capable of leading a double role or lying. According to him, Kirill Babitzin and Kirka were one and the same person. Also the name Kirka was not an artist name - which would split his person to a private and a public side - but a nickname people close to him have used since his childhood.

=== Values and hobbies ===
For Kirka, the Orthodox Church was the most important thing to seek refuge at times of trouble. Kirka had gone to church since his childhood, with his parents. Danny has said that the death of Kirka's big brother Sammy in a car accident in 1973 was a big setback for Kirka, but he reacted well considering the impact. Danny believes that Kirka's religious background had an effect in this. Also Kirka himself told the press about his memories concerning his Orthodox congregation. He also told his trusted journalists very openly about his private life, such as his love life and his extramarital daughter. In contrast, he hardly ever brought up the subject of his Russian roots and answered questions about them in the press very shortly. His band mate Vladimir "Nikke" Nikamo from The Creatures and Mosaic has said that despite numerous attempts, he never once managed to hold a proper conversation with Kirka in Russian, despite it being their common first language.

Kirka was known as an avid jogger, and he often went on hikes as long as 10 to 20 kilometres. He became interested in jogging in the early 1990s. Kirka was often seen running in his home neighbourhood of Kruununhaka in Helsinki, which gave him the nickname "The Virén of Liisankatu". In June 2004 Kirka ran the Stockholm Marathon in a time of 4:43:42. His hobby of jogging caused him to quit smoking which he had started already in his childhood.

Dressing properly was important for Kirka, and at the start of his career, he spent almost his entire income from singing on new clothes. In 1969 the Youth Council of Fashion in Finland chose Kirka was the best-dressed youth in Finland. In the next year, he was one of the top ten best-dressed men in the list of the Men's Council of Fashion in Finland. Kirka had a habit of relaxing and concentrating by ironing his shirts before his concerts.

== Popularity and recognition ==
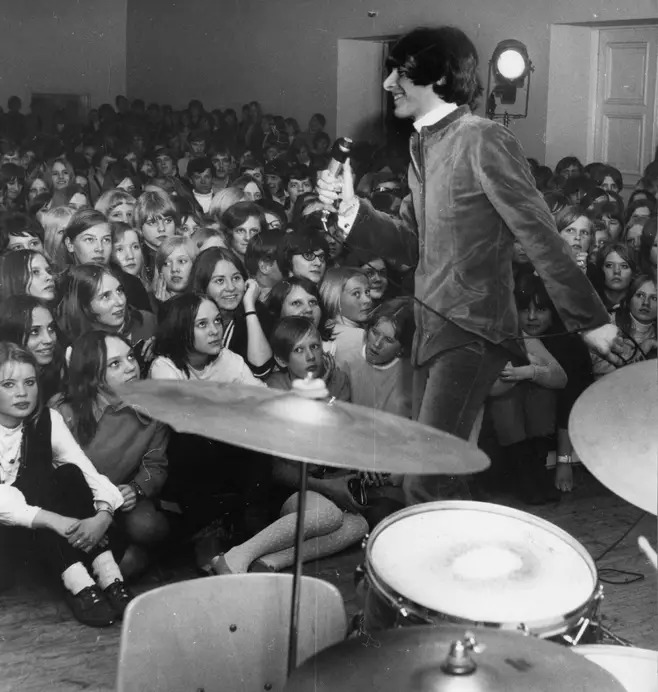
Kirka at a concert at the Karhulinna venue in Pori in March 1969

=== Audience ===
Kirka was one of the most popular rock and schlager singers in Finland. However, his success sometimes varied, and for example in the early 1980s he had briefly fallen from a great star to a common artist. At the very start of his career, Kirka's fans mainly consisted of teenage girls, but his audience soon became more diverse. By the 1990s Kirka's audience had grown to middle age along with him.

=== Album sales ===
Raila Kinnunen writes in her 1999 book Enimmäkseen Kirkasta that the total sales of Kirka's albums had surpassed one million copies, with Kirka being the first male singer in Finland to achieve this. According to Petri Lahti, the exact number is impossible to find out, but he too estimates Kirka's albums sold over one million copies. According to statistics by Musiikkituottajat, sales of albums worth a gold record alone account for over 754 thousand copies.

Kirka's most commercially successful album is Surun pyyhit silmistäni which sold over 214 thousand copies, and is the third-best selling Finnish album in Finland in all time. Kirka's next-best selling albums are Anna käsi (1989) which sold over 100 thousand copies and Ota lähellesi (1990). Of these, the first sold for double platinum and the second also sold for platinum, as did the albums Tie huomiseen (1996) and Hetki lyö: 1967 - 1997 (1997). The albums Hengaillaan (1984), R.O.C.K. (1986), Parhaat, uudet versiot (1990), Kasvot peilissä (1991), Pyydä vain (1992), Kirka (1994), 40 unohtumatonta laulua (2007) and Kaikki parhaat 1967 - 2007 (2007) have sold for gold.

=== Awards and recognition ===
In 1984 and 2000 Kirka was given the Emma Award for best male singer. In 1992 he was given the Special Emma Award, and as part of the Mestarit group he was given the Emma Awards for Surprise of the Year and Album of the Year in the early 21st century.

Kirka was a nominee for the Finlandia Prize for schlagers in 2003, but the award was given to Kari Tapio instead. In 2024 Kirka was chosen to the honorary gallery of the Finnish Music Hall of Fame.

== Works about Kirka ==
In 1982 Yleisradio showed the television document Kirka, laulaja. In the document, Kirka was interviewed about his job, the start of his career and his family life. In 1987 MTV3 showed a television document Tänä iltana Kirka about Kirka who has celebrating the 25th anniversary of his artist career. The document lasted an hour and included music and interviews, and it showed Kirka as an artist singing rock with a strong passion. Kirka's singing siblings Muska, Anna and Ykä were also present in the document. In 1990 Yleisradio and Gosteleradio in the Soviet Union cooperated to show a document showing Kirka's family roots. During the shooting of the document, Kirka and his mother Elisabeth spent a week in the Soviet Union.

Kirka's biography Enimmäkseen Kirkasta written as a cooperation by Kirka himself and Raila Kinnunen was published in October 1999. The book was autobiographical and true to Kirka's benevolent image, although he also described the challenges in his life, such as his difficult relationship with his father, his extramarital child and the end of his first marriage. Many people who knew Kirka well expressed criticism towards the glossy, one-dimensional image the book gave of Kirka.

In 2013 the Yleisradio Radioteatteri broadcast a series of radio shows on Radio Suomi about Kirka and his siblings titled Laulava Babitzinin perhe.

The "Hengaillaan" tour in 2014 played several of Kirka's popular songs and stories told by people close to him. Backed by Kirka's own band, the tour featured artists such as Pauli Hanhiniemi, Pete Parkkonen, Pentti Hietanen, Sami Hintsanen, Roosa Nummela as well as Muska, Ykä and Alexandra Babitzin.

The musical Surun pyyhit silmistäni by the Helsinki City Theatre premiered at the Peacock Theatre at Linnanmäki in Helsinki in February 2017. Kirka was played by actors Kalle Lindroth and Heikki Ranta.

The musical Varrella virran permiered in February 2018 in Salo. Kirka was played by Markus Niemi. In September 2018 another musical, Hetki lyö by the Finnish Musical Theatre, premiered. Kirka was played by Ilari Hämäläinen. Another musical called Surun pyyhit silmistäni premiered in September 2020 at the Kouvola Theatre. The new musical called Surun pyyhit silmistäni by the Rovaniemi Theatre premiered on Kirka's birthday 22 September 2022. The Kirka musical by the Finnish Musical Theatre was played at the Backas summer theatre in Vantaa since July 2024.

The book Kirka - Hetki lyö by Petri Lahti was published in 2022. it concentrates on Kirka's music but also documents memories and views of his gigs and public image.

== Discography ==
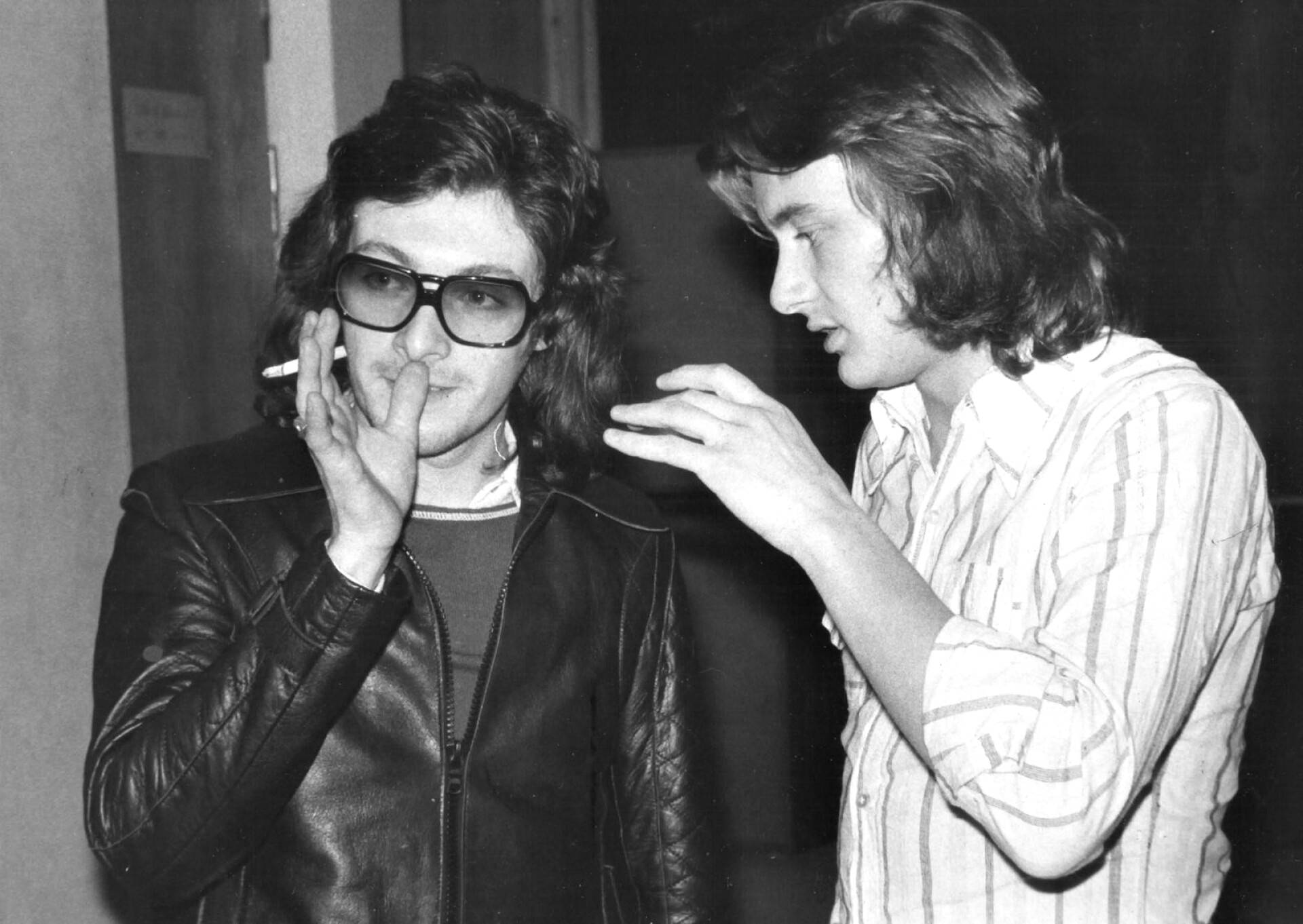
Kirka and Frank Robson preparing a recording (Nykyaikaa) in 1972

Kirka Babitzin released 78 singles and almost 60 albums, including 15 collections. Kirka's album Surun pyyhit silmistäni (1988) became the biggest selling album in Finnish history; it has now been relegated to all-time third place.

=== Albums ===
- Kirka keikalla (1969)
- Kirka (1969)
- Saat kaiken (1971)
- Nykyaikaa (1972)
- Rautaa ja kettinkiä (1973)
- Kirkan parhaita (1974)
- Tiukka linja (1975)
- Babitzinit konsertissa (1975)
- Lauantaiyö (1976)
- Kaksi puolta (1977)
- Anna & Kirka (1978)
- Kirkan parhaat (1979)
- Kirka (1981)
- Täytyy uskaltaa (1983)
- Hengaillaan (gold, 1984)
- Älä sano ei (1985)
- Isot hitit (1985)
- R.O.C.K. (gold, 1986)
- The Spell (gold, 1987)
- Surun pyyhit silmistäni (quadruple platinum, 1988)
- Anna käsi (double platinum, 1989)
- Iskelmäkansio (1989)
- Parhaat, uudet versiot (1990)
- Ota lähellesi (double platinum, 1990)
- Kasvot peilissä (platinum, 1991)
- Babitzin (1991)
- Pyydä vain (gold, 1992)
- Kirka (gold, 1994)
- Sadness in your Eyes (1995)
- Tie huomiseen (gold, 1996)
- Hetki lyö: 1967–1997 (platinum, 1997)
- Mestarit Areenalla (triple platinum, 1999)
- Suuri hetki (2000)
- Sinut siinä nään (2002)
- Elämääni eksynyt (2005)
- 40 unohtumatonta laulua (2006)
- The Best of Kirka (2007)

== Filmography ==
Year	Film	Role
1966	Topralli	Singer of the band The Creatures (uncredited)
1970	Takiaispallo	Singer of a pop band

== Dubbings ==
Kirka had a dubbing role on the Finnish dub of the animation film Rock-a-Doodle (1992) where he acted as the speaking and singing voice of the rooster in the main role. The Finnish dub of the Walt Disney Pictures film Oliver & Company (1988) features the song "Olipa kerran New Yorkissa" ("Once upon a time in New York") sung by Kirka.

== See also ==
- List of best-selling music artists in Finland

Preceded by Ami Aspelund with Fantasiaa	Finland in the Eurovision Song Contest; 1984	Succeeded by Sonja Lumme with Eläköön elämä
