= Sammy Babitzin =

Finnish singer (1948–1973)

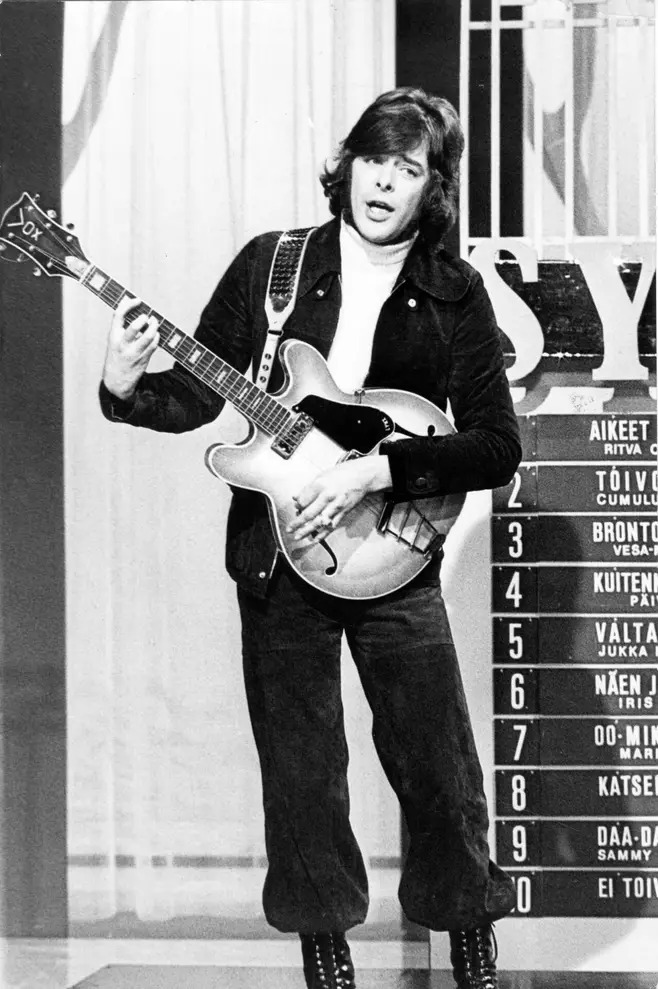

Background information
- Also known as: Sammy-boy
- Born: 11 July 1948; Helsinki, Finland
- Died: 29 April 1973 (aged 24) Jyväskylä, Finland
- Genres: 1960s pop
- Occupations: Singer; musician; songwriter
- Instruments: Vocals; guitar
- Years active: 1960s–1973

Aleksandr "Sammy" Babitzin (Russian: Александр Бабицын; 11 July 1948 – 29 April 1973) was a Finnish popular music singer, the brother of Kirka and Muska.

Babitzin was born into a Russian family in Helsinki, and he was of partial German-Russian descent through his mother. He started his professional career in a band called The Stealers. Its line-up also included Remu Aaltonen. Babitzin sang in the group of Leo Lindblom under the pseudonym "Sammy-boy".

Sammy Babitzin released his first single in 1966. Many of his songs were duets recorded together with his brother. Babitzin won the "Syksyn Sävel" song contest (MTV3) in 1972 with the song "Daa-da daa-da". Other successful hits included "Kuin tuhka tuuleen" (orig. Don't Pull Your Love by Hamilton, Joe Frank & Reynolds), "Kukat Kauniit Sulle Toisin" (orig. If I Thought You'd Ever Change Your Mind" by Cilla Black) and "Pikku-Kallen päivän huuli" . He never released a studio album before his death in 1973.

In 1967, he married Riitta Kilpala, and their son, Mikael, was born three months after the wedding. However, the two got a divorce in 1969.

Babitzin's career was cut short when he was killed in a car crash. An Alfa Romeo 1750 GTV owned by Babitzin and driven by his friend lost control on a slippery bridge surface near Äänekoski at a speed of around 160 km/h (100 mph; the road had no speed limit at the time of the accident), careered off the road and struck an embankment. None of the four people (Babitzin, his friend, his girlfriend and a young hitchhiker they had picked up) were wearing seat belts and the first three were ejected from the car when it crashed. All four were taken to the Jyväskylä hospital, where Babitzin died of his injuries, aged only 24. His friend and his girlfriend were also killed, and the hitchhiker was the only survivor. Before the accident, Babitzin had been a Eurovision Song Contest candidate with his song "Riviera".
