= Muska =

Finnish singer (born 1952)

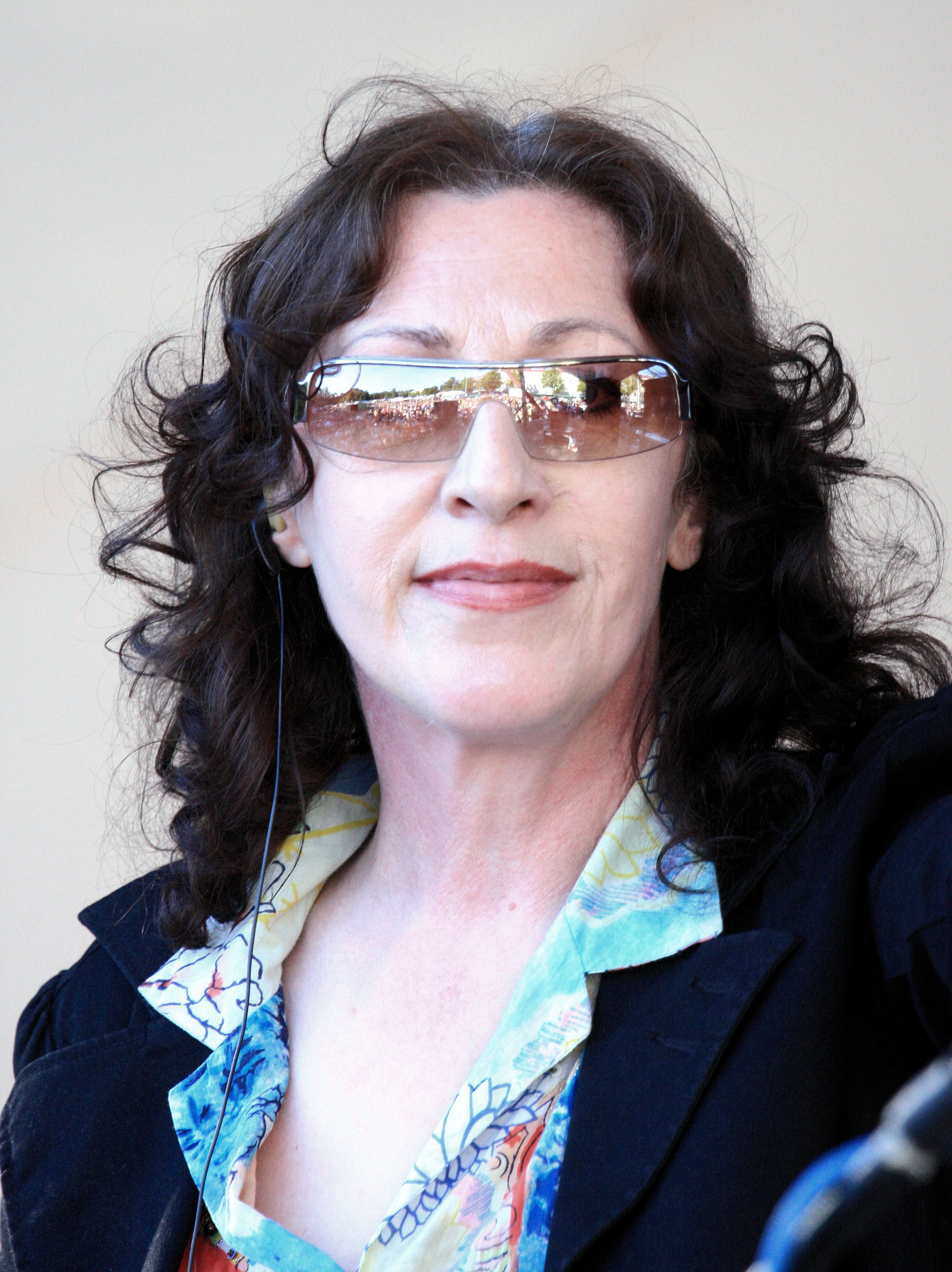
- Muska in 2008

Background information
- Born: Marija Babitzin; 28 June 1952 (age 73); Helsinki, Finland
- Genres: Finnish rock; pop rock; iskelmä
- Occupation: singer
- Years active: 1969–present
- Labels: Johanna Kustannus; Poptori
- Website: www.muska.fi

Marija "Muska" Babitzin (Russian: Мария Бабицын; born 28 June 1952) is a Finnish singer. She became famous in 1971 with "Kirjoita postikorttiin" ('Write on the postcard'), a cover version of "Send Me a Postcard" by Shocking Blue. Her first, eponymous album was released in 1973. It featured the hit "Krokotiili-rock", a cover of Elton John's "Crocodile Rock".

Muska participated with her brother Georgij "Ykä" Babitzin in the Finnish national final of Eurovision Song Contest, Euroviisut 1974. The entry "Senhän sanoo järkikin" came sixth. In 1979 she again participated in the Finnish national final with her brother Kirka Babitzin and sister Anna Babitzin. The entry "Aikuiset anteeksi antaa" came fourth.

Muska's elder brothers Sammy (1948–1973) and Kirill "Kirka" (1950–2007) were also well-known Finnish singers. Babitzins are Old Russians of Finland.

== Discography ==
=== Albums ===
1. Muska, 1973
2. Tää se päivä on (Today Is the Day), 1977
3. Pidä kii (Hold On), 1991
4. Pienet suuret pojat (Little Big Boys), 1993
5. Paha silmä (Evil Eye), 2001
6. Anna mulle aikaa (Give Me Some Time), 2006
