= Anhava =

Anhava is a surname. Notable people with the surname include:

- Helena Anhava (1925–2018), Finnish poet, author and translator
- Tuomas Anhava (1927–2001), Finnish writer
