= Rauli Somerjoki =

Finnish rock singer (1947–1987)

Rauli "Badding" Somerjoki
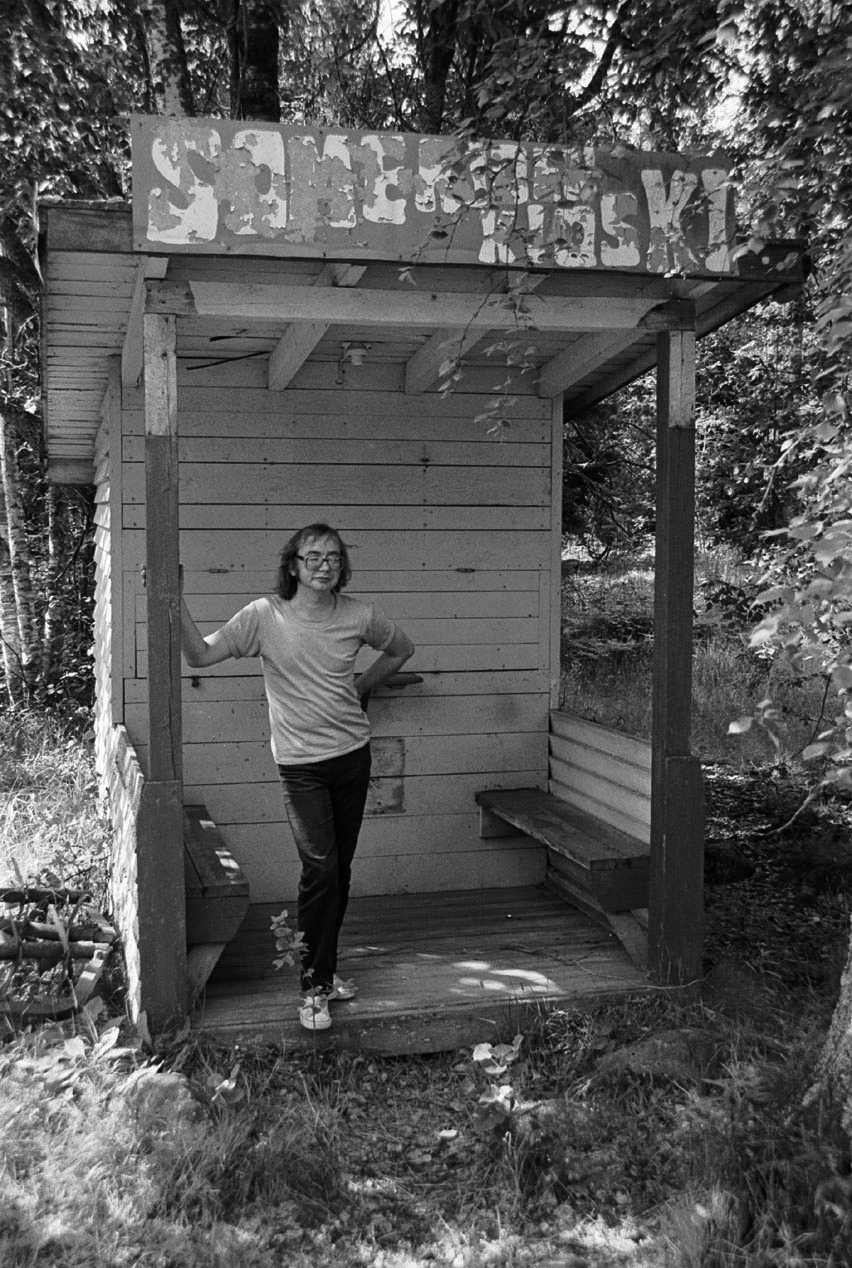
- Somerjoki in 1984

Background information
- Also known as: Badding
- Born: Rauli Aarre Tapani Somerjoki; 30 August 1947; Somero, Finland
- Origin: Somero, Finland
- Died: 14 January 1987 (aged 39) Helsinki, Finland
- Genres: Finnish rock; Schlager; rock and roll
- Occupations: singer, songwriter
- Years active: 1966–1987
- Labels: Love Records; Johanna Kustannus; Minimusic; Dojo; AAB-Tuotanto

Rauli Somerjoki (born Rauli Aarre Tapani Somerjoki; 30 August 1947 – 14 January 1987), known professionally as "Badding", was a Finnish rock singer born in the town of Somero into a family of five children. His records were published on such labels as Love Records.

== Career ==
Badding Somerjoki founded his first band, The Five Yes, in 1963 and also played in the group Suomen Talvisota 1939-1940. He and M. A. Numminen caused a major scandal in 1966 with provocative songs like "Mitä nuoren aviomiehen tulee muistaa" ('What Young Husbands Should Remember') and "Jenkka ulkosynnyttimistä" ('Vulva Jenkka'), whose performance resulted in the interruption of the concert by the police although the lyrics were simply texts from factual books on marriage and sexuality available in public libraries.

Badding's most famous songs include "Fiilaten ja höyläten" (originally Reelin' and Rockin' by Chuck Berry); "Paratiisi" ('Paradise', a song composed by Badding himself and the lyrics written together with Arja Tiainen); "Bensaa suonissa" ('Gasoline in the veins', composed by Badding himself, with lyrics written by Jarkko Laine); "Ikkunaprinsessa" ('Window Princess', originally Glendora); "Tähdet, tähdet" ('Stars, Stars', a song made by Somerjoki himself); and "Laivat" ('Ships', 'Parakhody', originally a Russian popular song).

Badding started his solo career in 1970. He competed in the Syksyn sävel song contest with "Ja rokki soi" written by Matti ja Teppo.

During his later career, Badding worked with the Agents. His last gig took place in Seinäjoki on 28 December 1986. During the autumn, he had suffered many bouts of bronchitis. In January 1987, he died in Helsinki of alcohol-related ailments at the age of 39.

== Discography ==
=== Studio albums ===
- Synnyin rokkaamaan (1971)
- Näin käy rock & roll (1974)
- Sydän lämpöä täys (1975)
- Rakkaudella – Raulilta (1982) / Sävel rakkauden (1986) / Bussi Somerolle (2001)
- Ikkunaprinsessa (1982)
- Tähdet, tähdet (1983)
- Laivat (1985)

Several compilation albums and a tribute album have been also released.

== Works about ==
=== Book ===
Aki Kaurismäki has used Somerjoki's music in his films and published a biography of Somerjoki titled Badding: Rauli Somerjoen elämä ja laulut (1996) written by Heikki Metsämäki and Juha Miettinen. Somerjoki also appeared in the film The Worthless (Finnish: Arvottomat) by Mika Kaurismäki in 1982.

=== Docudrama film ===
In 2000 Markku Pölönen directed the film Badding, starring Janne Reinikainen about Somerjoki's life. (It is available on DVD, bundled with Pölönen's Onnen maa, a comedy drama about a Finnish farm family, featuring Finnish tango.)

== See also ==
- Heikki Metsämäki and Juha Miettinen: Badding: Rauli Somerjoen elämä ja laulut. Sputnik, 1996. ISBN 951-97431-0-3. (in Finnish)
- List of best-selling music artists in Finland
