= Pekka Gronow =

Finnish ethnomusicologist (born 1943)

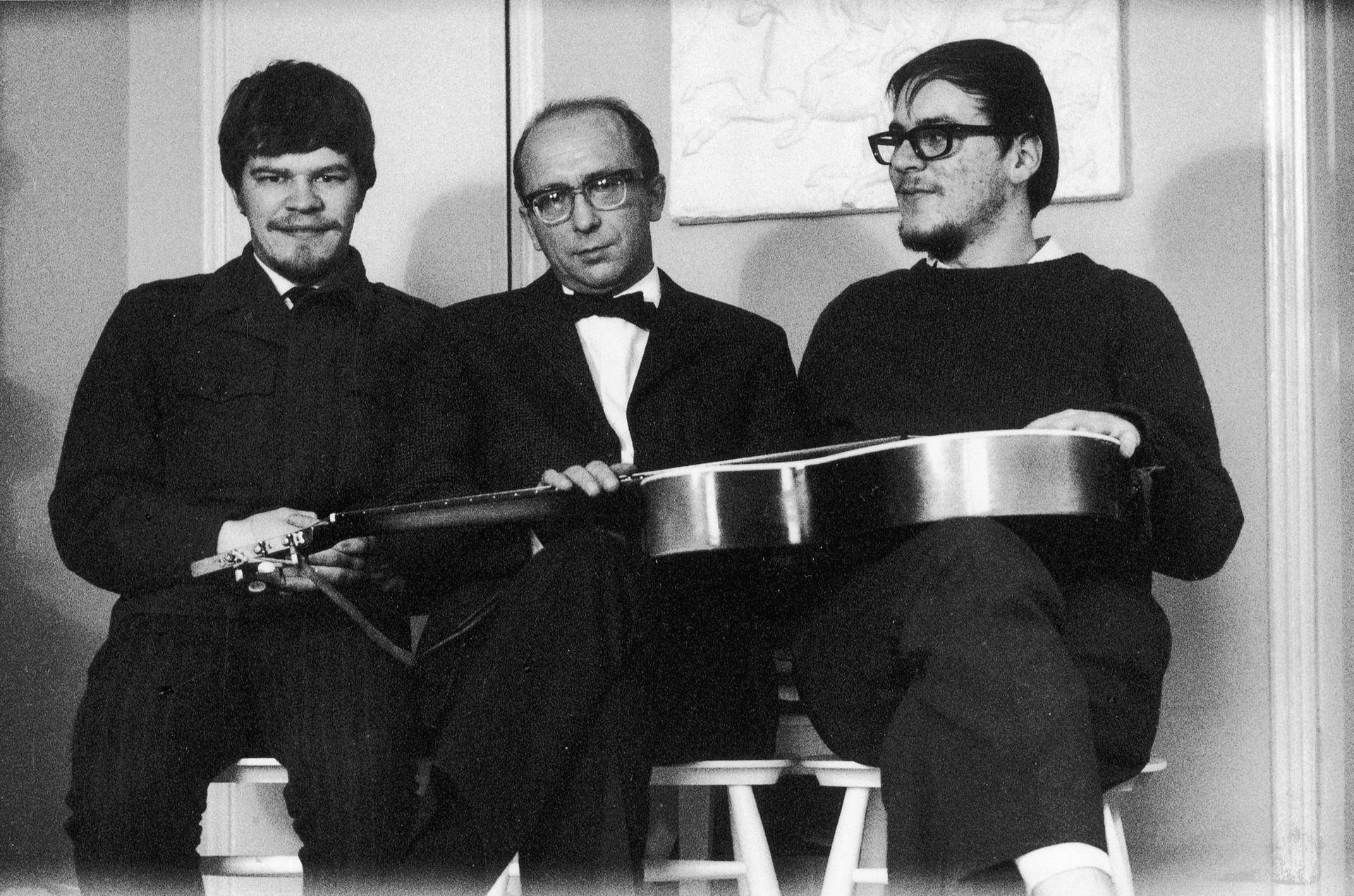
M. A. Numminen, Unto Mononen and Pekka Gronow in 1968.

Pekka Heikki Tapani Gronow (born 1 November 1943, Helsinki) is a Finnish ethnomusicologist and historian of the recording industry. He studied at Wesleyan University with David P. McAllester and Robert E. Brown and at the University of Helsinki and received his PhD from the University of Tampere. He was the head of the record library at Yleisradio (Finnish Broadcasting Company) 1989–2006 and an archiving specialist 2007–2008. Gronow became known in the 1960s for his radio programs on jazz and blues. In 1966 he founded with M. A. Numminen Eteenpäin, a record company which issued Numminen's works and other underground artists.

He has written books and articles on popular music, communications and the history of the recording industry. He has received the Lifetime Achievement Award of the Association for Recorded Sound Collections (2002) and the Fredrik Pacius award of Svenska Litteratursällskapet i Finland (2018).

== Bibliography ==
=== Books ===
- Popmusiikin vuosisata. Helsinki: Tammi, 1968. (with Seppo Bruunin)
- Laulukirja – työväen lauluja kahdeksalta vuosikymmeneltä. Tammi, Helsinki 1971.
- Äänilevyn historia. Porvoo Helsinki Juva: WSOY, 1990. ISBN 951-0-16155-1. (with Ilpo Saunio)
- Suomi soi 1: Tanssilavoilta tangomarkkinoille. Helsinki: Tammi, 2002. ISBN 951-31-2505-X. (with Jukka Lindfors ja Jake Nyman)
- Suomi soi 2: Rautalangasta hiphoppiin. Helsinki: Tammi, 2004. ISBN 951-31-2506-8. (with Jukka Lindfors ja Jake Nyman)
- Suomi soi 3: Ääniaalloilta parrasvaloihin. Helsinki: Tammi, 2005. ISBN 951-31-2507-6. (with Jukka Lindfors ja Jake Nyman)
- Kulttuuripolitiikan käsikirja. Otava, Helsinki 1976
- Studies in Scandinavian-American Discography 1–2. Suomen äänitearkisto, Helsinki 1977
- The Columbia 33000-F Irish Series. A Numerical Listing. JEMF Special Series 10. John Edwards Memorial Foundation, Los Angeles 1979
- "Hawaiian music in Scandinavia." — George S. Kanahele (ed.): Hawaiian music and musicians. The University Press of Hawaii, Honolulu 1979
- Statistics in the Field of Sound Recordings. Studies no. C21. Division of Statistics on Culture and Communication. Unesco, Paris 1980
- "Ethnic recordings: an introduction." — Ethnic Recordings in America: A Neglected Heritage. Library of Congress, Washington DC 1982
- Viestinnän tulevaisuus. TSL, Helsinki 1985
- Digitaalinen radio. Suomen tekijänoikeudellinen yhdistys, Helsinki 1995 (Engl, Transl. Digital radio, 1995)
- "Elokuvien äänen restaurointi", esitelmämoniste. Suomen elokuvasäätiö 1996
- "Iskelmäelokuvien aika." — Kari Uusitalo ym. (ed.): Suomen kansallisfilmografia 6, 1957–1961. Suomen elokuva-arkisto ja VAPK-kustannus, Helsinki 1995
- The Lindström project, Vol. 1 - 10. GHT, Wien 2009 - 2019 (with Christiane Hofer)

=== English language articles ===
- "The record industry comes to the Orient", Ethnomusicology 25:2, 1981.
- "The record industry: the growth of a mass medium." — Richard Middleton (toim.): Popular Music Vol. III. Cambridge University Press, Cambridge 1983.
- The Recording Industry. An Ethnomusicological Approach. Acta Universitatis Tamperensis A:504, Tampere 1996
- "The sound archivist looks at ISRC", IASA Journal 1996:8
- "The tango and Finnish popular music". Pirjo Kukkonen: Tango Nostalgia. The Language of Love and Longing. Helsinki University Press, Helsinki 1996, 2nd ed. 2003
- "The recordings of Aino Ackte." — Giuliano Macchi, Marcello Gallucci ja Carlo Scimone: Musicus discologus. Musiche e scritti per il 70. anno di Carlo Marinelli. Monteleone, Vibo Valentia 1997
- An International History of the Recording Industry. Cassell, London & New York 1998 (with Ilpo Saunio)
- "YLE Digital Sound Archive". EBU Technical Review no.280, 1999. (Chinese transl.. International Broadcast Information 14:3, no. 133, Hong Kong 2000) (with Markku Petäjä)
- "Digital Audio Archiving in Public Broadcasting", -- AES 20th International Conference Proceedings. Audio Engineering Society, Budapest 2001 (with Jouni Frilander, Markku Petäjä and Antti Järvinen)
- ”Inventing recorded music: the recorded repertoire in Scandinavia 1899-1925”, Popular Music 3/2006 (with Björn Englund)
- “Remaking jazz history.” — De-Canonizing music history (toim. Vesa Kurkela). Cambridge 2009
- “Finnish and Finnish-American Folklore Studies: An Afterword”, Journal of Finnish Studies 14/1, Summer 2010
- ”Sacred music and the recording industry: a historical overview.” — Alessandro Argentini & Lucia Ludovica de Nardo: Fonti della musica sacra: testi e incisioni discografiche. Libreria Musicale Italiana, Lucca 2011
- "Äänilevy." — Kaarle Nordenstreng and Osmo A. Wiio (eds.): Suomen mediamaisema, Vastapaino, Tampere 2012
- ”Finland.” — Lee Marshall (ed), The International Recording Industries, Routledge, London & New York 2012
- ”The World’s Greatest Sound Archive: 78 rpm Records as a Source for Musicological Research”, Traditiones (Ljubljana) 43/2, 2014
- ”Mikrofona aptauja: Conformists and Dissidents in a Latvian Song Competition.” – Jan Blüml, Yvetta Kajanová and Rudiger Ritter: Popular Music in Communist and Post-Communist Europe. Peter Lange, Berlin 2019
