= Jarkko Laine =

Finnish poet (1947–2006)

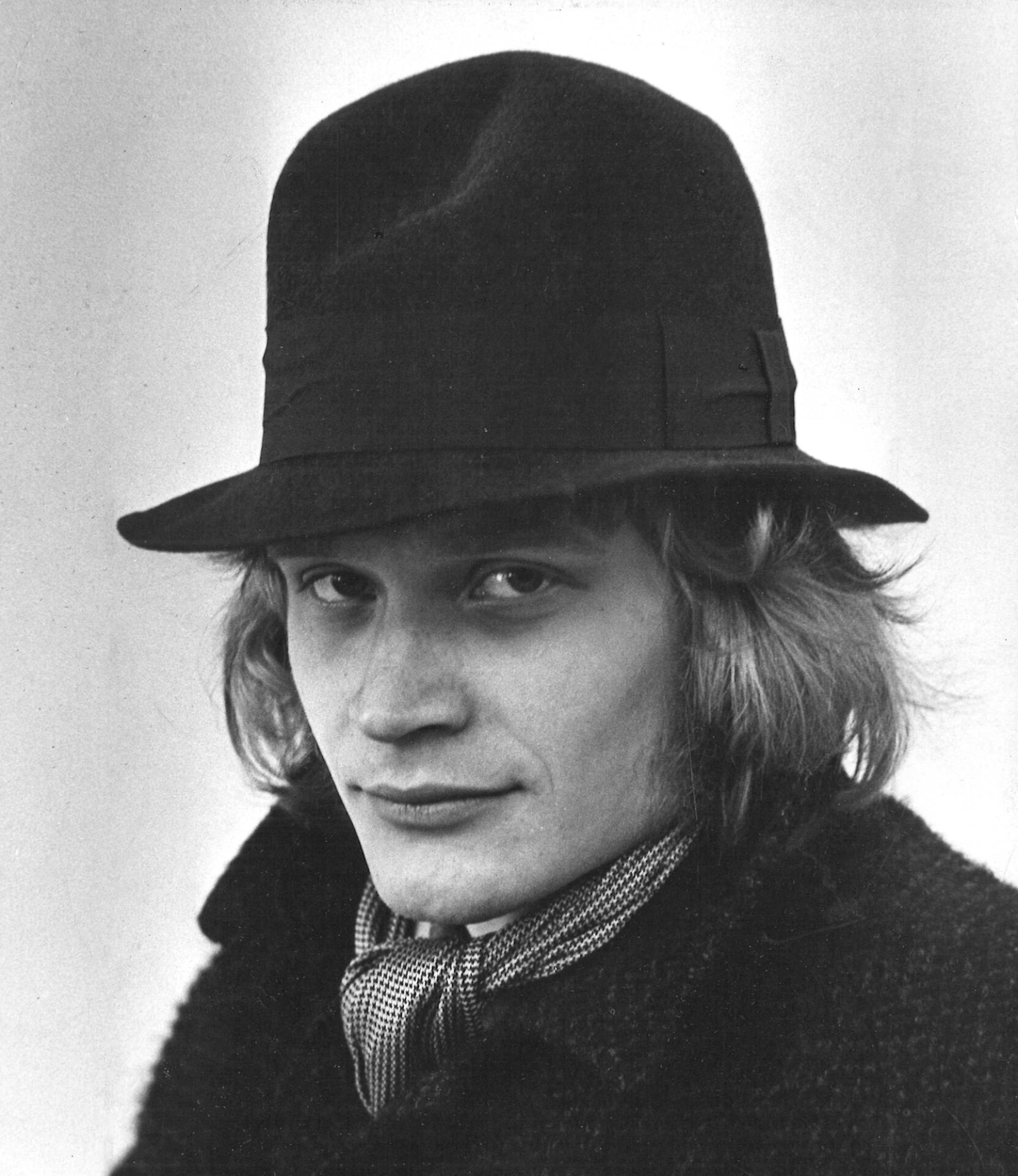
- Jarkko Laine in 1972.
- Born: March 17, 1947; Turku, Finland
- Died: October 26, 2006 (aged 59); Turku, Finland
- Occupations: Poet; novelist; playwright; translator; editor
- Writing career
- Genres: Postmodernism; Underground; satire
- Notable works: Muovinen abrakadabra; Vampyyri; Haun sokeat numerot
- Notable awards: Pro Finlandia Medal (1988); Eino Leino Prize (2002)

Jarkko Aarre Juhani Laine (17 March 1947 – 19 August 2006) was a Finnish poet and a writer of prose and plays. He also translated American literature to Finnish.

Jarkko Laine was born in Turku, Finland. He became known from the 1960s underground movement, deriving inspiration from popular culture, pop music and comics. He provided some lyrics for the band Suomen Talvisota 1939–1940, and for popular singer Rauli Badding Somerjoki he wrote such song lyrics as 'Bensaa suonissa', 'Hymyile Miss Universum' and 'Pilvet karkaa, niin minäkin' (the latter being the title song of Aki Kaurismäki's film Drifting Clouds). Jarkko Laine was the editorial assistant for the literature magazine Parnasso in the years 1969–1986 and its editor-in-chief in the years 1987–2002. He was also the President of The Union of Finnish Writers in the years 1987–2002.

== Bibliography ==
=== Novels ===
- Haamumaili (1968)
- Niin kulki Kolumbus (1969)
- Kuin ruumissaatto (1970)
- Vampyyri eli miten Wilhelm Kojac kuoli kovat kaulassa (1971)
- Nick Naantali itäisillä mailla (1974)
- Futari (1977)
- Vaikeita asentoja (1982)
- Naapuri (with M.A. Numminen and Markku Into, 2002)
- Intialainen horoskooppi ja muita satunnaisia makulatuurikatkelmia (2003)

=== Collections of short stories ===
- Saksalainen vävy (1988)
- Maailman yksinäisin mies (1992)

=== Collections of poetry ===
- Muovinen Buddha (1967)
- Tulen ja jään sirkus(1970)
- Niin se käy (1971)
- Nauta lentää (1973)
- Valitut runot (1975)
- Viidenpennin Hamlet (1976)
- Paratiisi (1978)
- Elämä on vuokrahuone (1980)
- Amerikan cowboy (1981)
- Villiintynyt puu (1984)
- Elokuvan jälkeen (1986)
- Traagisen runoilijan talo (1986)
- Runot 1967–1987 (1987)
- Oodi eiliselle sanomalehdelle (1989)
- Pyhä maanantai (1991)
- Iloisen neekerin katu (1992)
- Toinen mustakantinen vihko. Kriipustuksia, muistiinpanoja, reunamerkintöjä (2003)

=== Plays ===
- Virtasen Masa (1972)

== Sources ==
- Jarkko Laine at Suomen kansallisbiografia (National Biography of Finland).
