= Parnasso =

Finnish literary magazine

- Categories: Literary magazine
- Frequency: Seven times per year
- Publisher: Otavamedia Oy
- Founded: 1951; 74 years ago
- Company: Yhtyneet Kuvalehdet Oy
- Country: Finland
- Based in: Helsinki
- Language: Finnish
- Website: Parnasso
- ISSN: 0031-2320
- OCLC: 470184985

Parnasso is a literary magazine published in Helsinki, Finland. The magazine has been in circulation since 1951. It is among the most respected literary magazines in the country.

== History and profile ==
Parnasso was established in 1951. It was modeled on Bonniers Litterära Magasin, a Swedish literary magazine. The headquarters of Parnasso is in Helsinki. The magazine is part of Yhtyneet Kuvalehdet Oy, and its publisher is Otavamedia Oy.

Parnasso is published seven times per year and covers original writings on poetry, short fiction, essays, literary journalism, and reviews of both belles-lettres and nonfiction work. In 1959 Parnasso published a special edition on Japanese literature which included tankas, Japanese poetry genre, translated by Tuomas Anhava, its editor-in-chief. This edition also featured a Finnish translation of the short story by Fumiko Hayashi. In the 1960s one of the regular contributors was Pentti Saarikoski. The magazine published Finnish translations of the poems by the Spanish poet Federico García Lorca and by the Chilean poet Pablo Neruda. These poems were translated into Finnish by Jarno Pennanen, a Finnish poet. The Finnish translations of the poems by the Russian Vladimir Mayakovsky were also published in the magazine in its eighth issue dated 1963.

As of 2021 each issue of Parnasso featured nearly ten book reviews. In a study it was concluded that the books reviewed in the magazine included in the most borrowed book lists of the public libraries in the Helsinki region.

During the editorship of Kai Laitinen the Congress for Cultural Freedom, an anti-communist American organization, attempted to develop an affiliation with Parnasso, but it did not work.

=== Editors-in-chief ===
The past editors-in-chief of Parnasso are as follows: Kaarlo Marjanen (1951-1954), Lauri Viljanen (1954-1956), Aatos Ojala (1957-1958), Kai Laitinen (1958-1966), Tuomas Anhava (1966-1979), Juhani Salokannel (1980-1986), Jarkko Laine (1987-2002), and Juhana Rossi (2003-2004) In 2005 Jarmo Papinniemi became the editor-in-chief of the magazine. As of 2014 Karo Hämäläinen was serving in the post.

== Circulation ==
The audited circulation of Parnasso was 4,145 copies in 2003. The magazine sold 7,027 copies in 2011. Its circulation was 6,119 copies in 2013.

== See also ==
- List of magazines in Finland
