= Markku Into =

Finnish poet

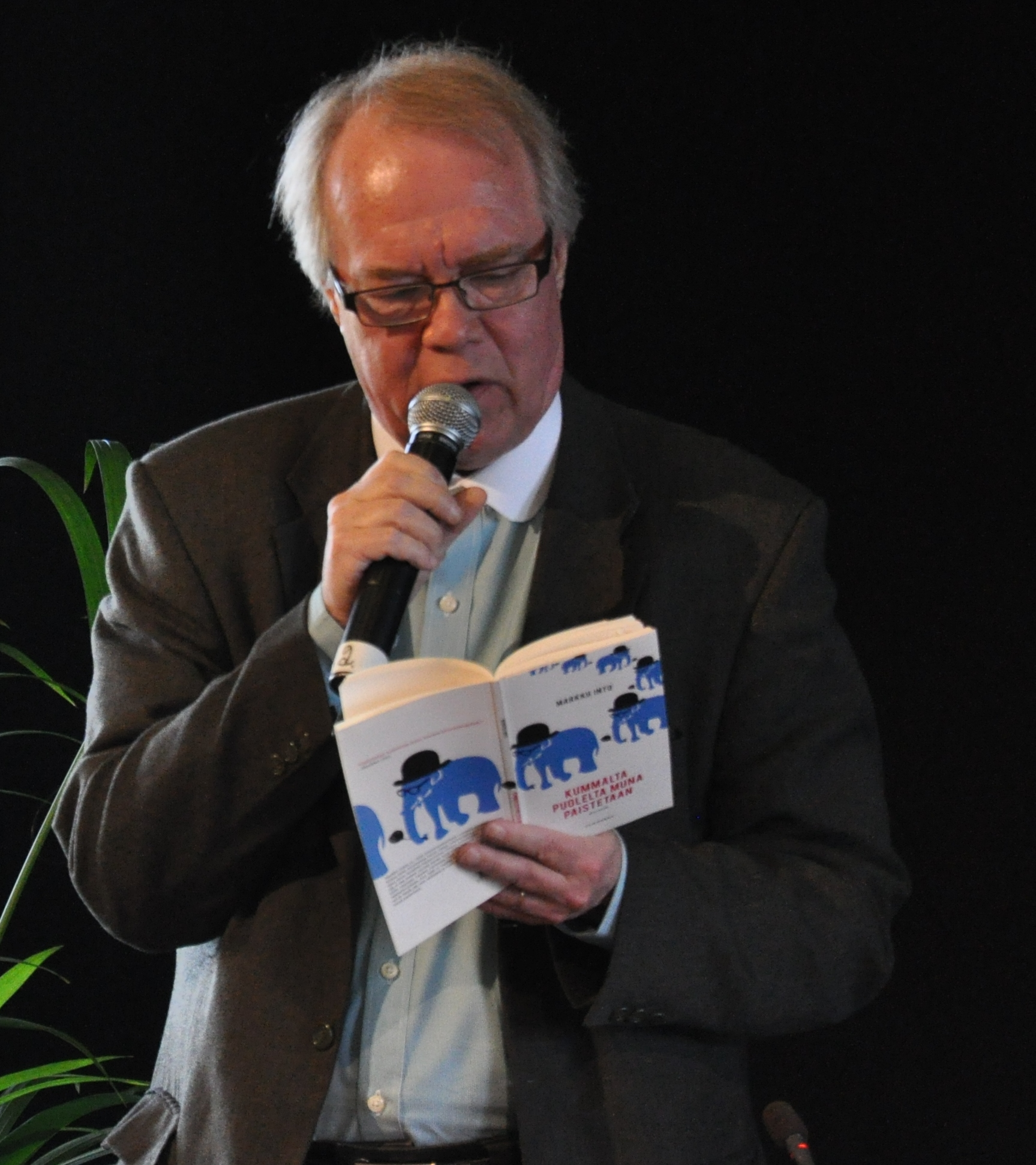
Markku Into (2009)

Markku Into was a Finnish poet and one of the main members in Finnish 1960s underground movement of Turku. Markku Into has written collections of poetry, prose and plays. He has also translated into Finnish such American Beat Generation writers as Allen Ginsberg, Lawrence Ferlinghetti and Gregory Corso; also Charles Bukowski. He wrote lyrics for the band Suomen Talvisota 1939-1940. His literary debut was Tuonela Rock of 1971. Markku Into has also received the Eino Leino Prize in 2001.

Alongside Suomen Talvisota 1939-1940, he has performed in the 21st century with Turku's band Turun Romantiikka.

== Bibliography ==
- Tuonela Rock (1971)
- Tänään kotona (1978)
- Etäisten lauseiden mies (1980)
- U (1982)
- Päästä minut lihasta (1983)
- Um Tut Sut (1985)
- Tuskin tulee ilta (1988)
- Yön kevyt polttoöljy (1990)
- Elvis eli elämänsä yksin (1991)
- Etsivätoimisto Andrejev ja Milton (with M.A. Numminen, 1991)
- Mies ja painovoima (1995)
- Raivoava takakirves (2001)
- Naapuri (with M.A. Numminen and Jarkko Laine, 2002)
- Hyvä yö (2003)
- Kiivaat tyvenet - valitut runot 1964-2005 (2005)
