= Suomen Talvisota 1939–1940 =

Finnish rock band

Suomen Talvisota 1939–1940 was a provocative Finnish rock band in the years 1969 and 1970. Their only album is called Underground-Rock. Lyrics for the band were provided under pseudonyms by M.A. Numminen and the Turku poets Markku Into (under the pseudonym Taannehtiva Seuralainen) and Jarkko Laine (under the pseudonym Lauri Kenttä, a reference to Superman's alter ego, Clark Kent). The name of the band literally means "The Finnish Winter War 1939-1940". They are widely considered a founding band of Finnish rock music, starting the careers of Numminen and Rauli Badding Somerjoki, influencing artists such as Juice Leskinen, and even serving as early precursors to the Finnish punk scene.

== Line-up ==
- M.A. Numminen (under the pseudonyms Oriveden kenkätehdas, E. Väline, Ruotsin Kuningas, La Kamarado)
- Rauli Somerjoki (under the pseudonyms G.A. Johanssonin Perikunta, V. Esine)
- Pentti Aho
- Arto Koskinen
- Heikki Kasari
- Rauli "Pole" Ojanen (under the pseudonym Erik af Venusberg)
- Timo Aarniala (a visual artist)

== Other personnel on the album ==
- Tarmo Manni (Kosminen Nauraja)
- Antero Jakoila
- Ronnie Österberg
- Paroni Paakkunainen
- Heikki Kasari
- Tommi Parko
- Mamba Koskinen
- Kikke Bergholm
- Matti Bergström
- Matti Oiling
- Raikka Rautarinne

== Albums discography ==
- Underground-Rock (1970)
