= M. A. Numminen =

Finnish musical artist (born 1940)

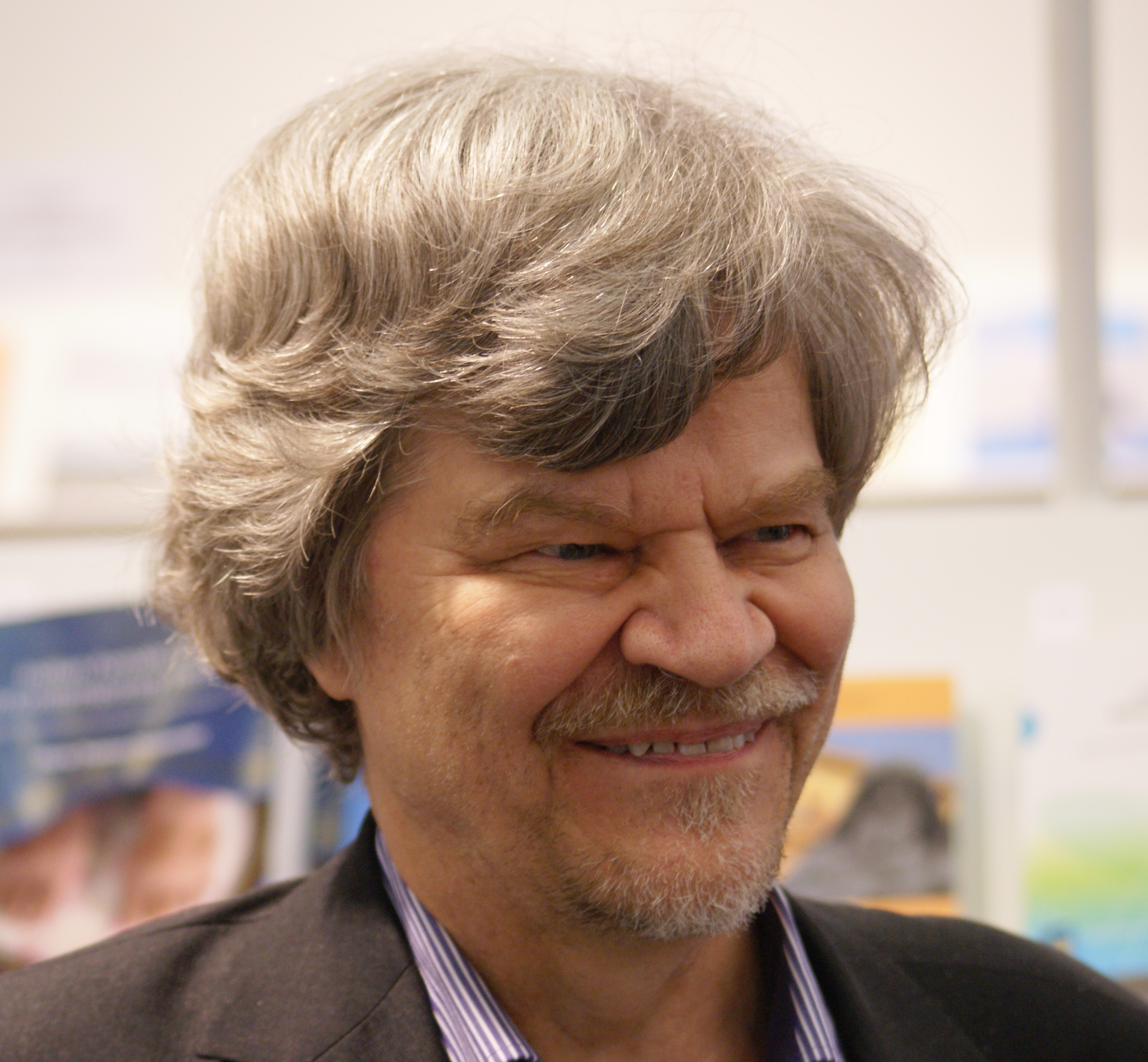
- At the Gothenburg book fair, 2011

Background information
- Also known as: La Kamarado, Ruotsin Kuningas, Viljo Kyttälä, Oriveden Kenkätehdas, Usko Suomalainen, E. Väline, Gommi
- Born: Mauri Antero Numminen; 12 March 1940 (age 86)
- Origin: Somero, Finland
- Genres: Jazz, tango, rock, schlager, children's songs, avantgarde, electronic music, hip hop
- Occupations: singer, musician, composer, author, producer
- Years active: 1963–present

Mies Mauri Antero Numminen (born 12 March 1940) is a Finnish artist who has worked in several different fields of music and culture.

== Biography ==
=== Early life ===
Mies Mauri Antero Numminen was born in Somero in Southwest Finland on 12 March 1940, son of Paavo Numminen who was CEO of the progressive cooperative Osuusliike Oras, and Aira Aaltonen, who was head of a textile department. He was educated at the coeducational comprehensive school in Somero.

=== Multiple roles and genres ===
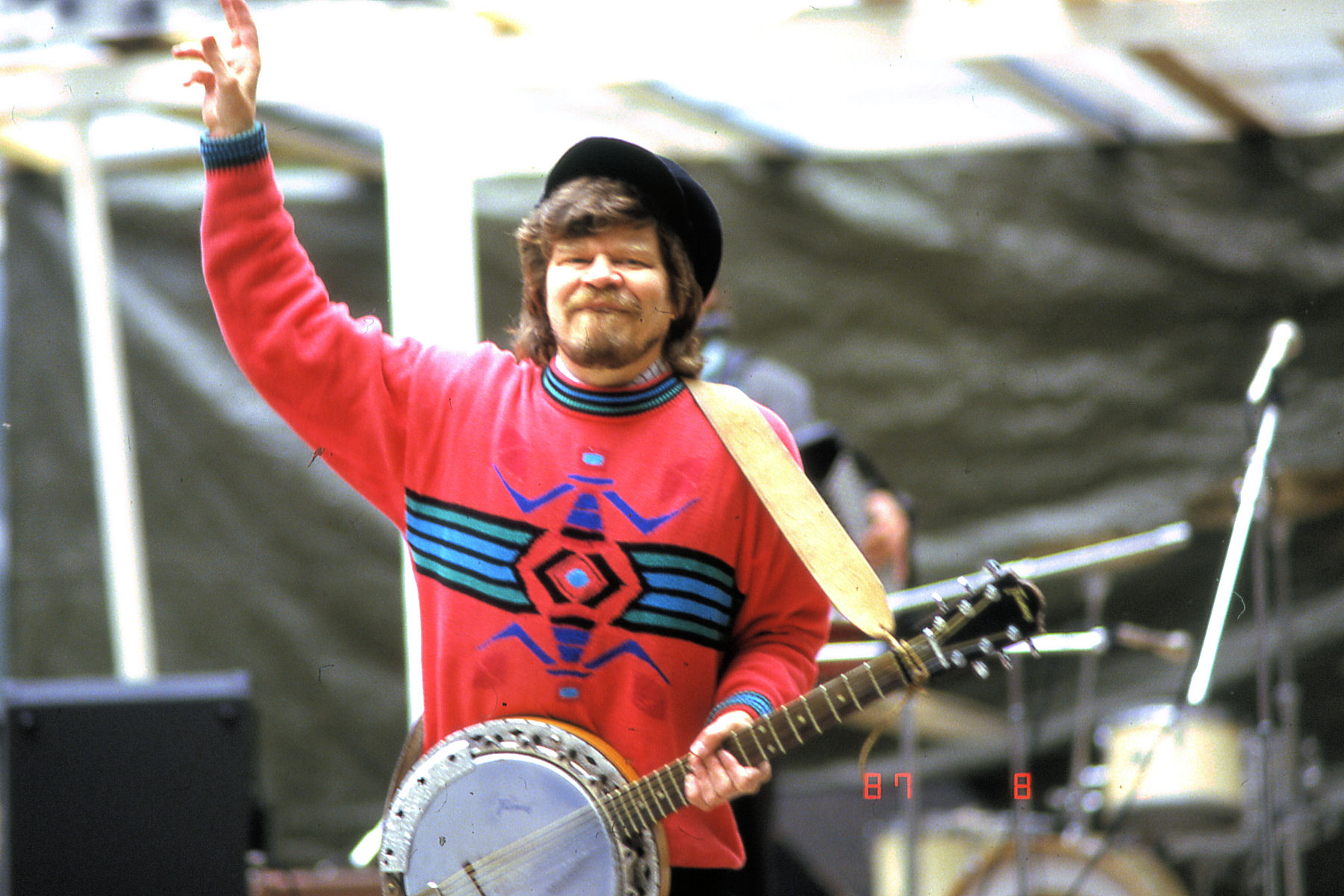
In 1987

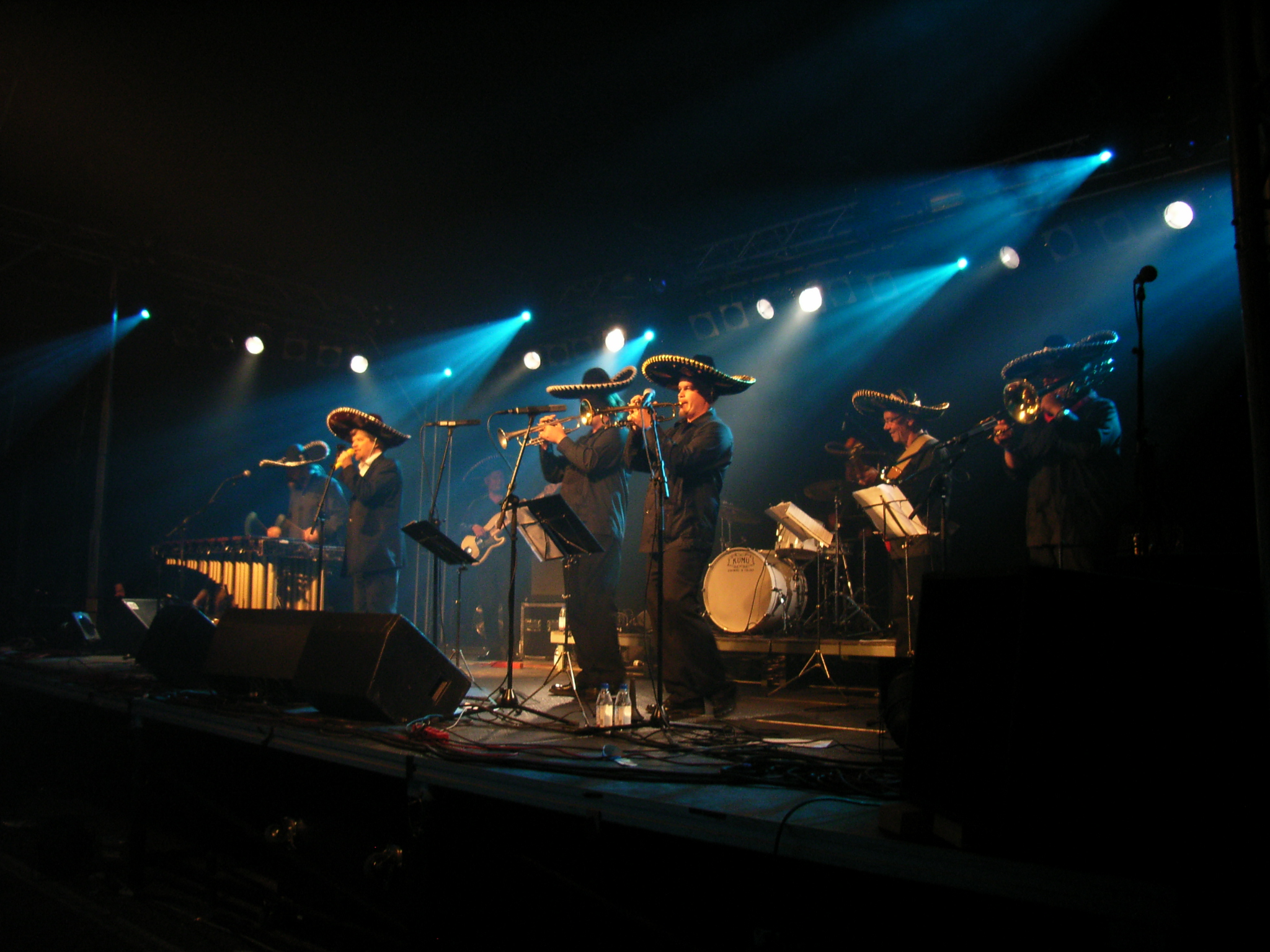
At the 2006 Down By The Laituri music festival in Turku

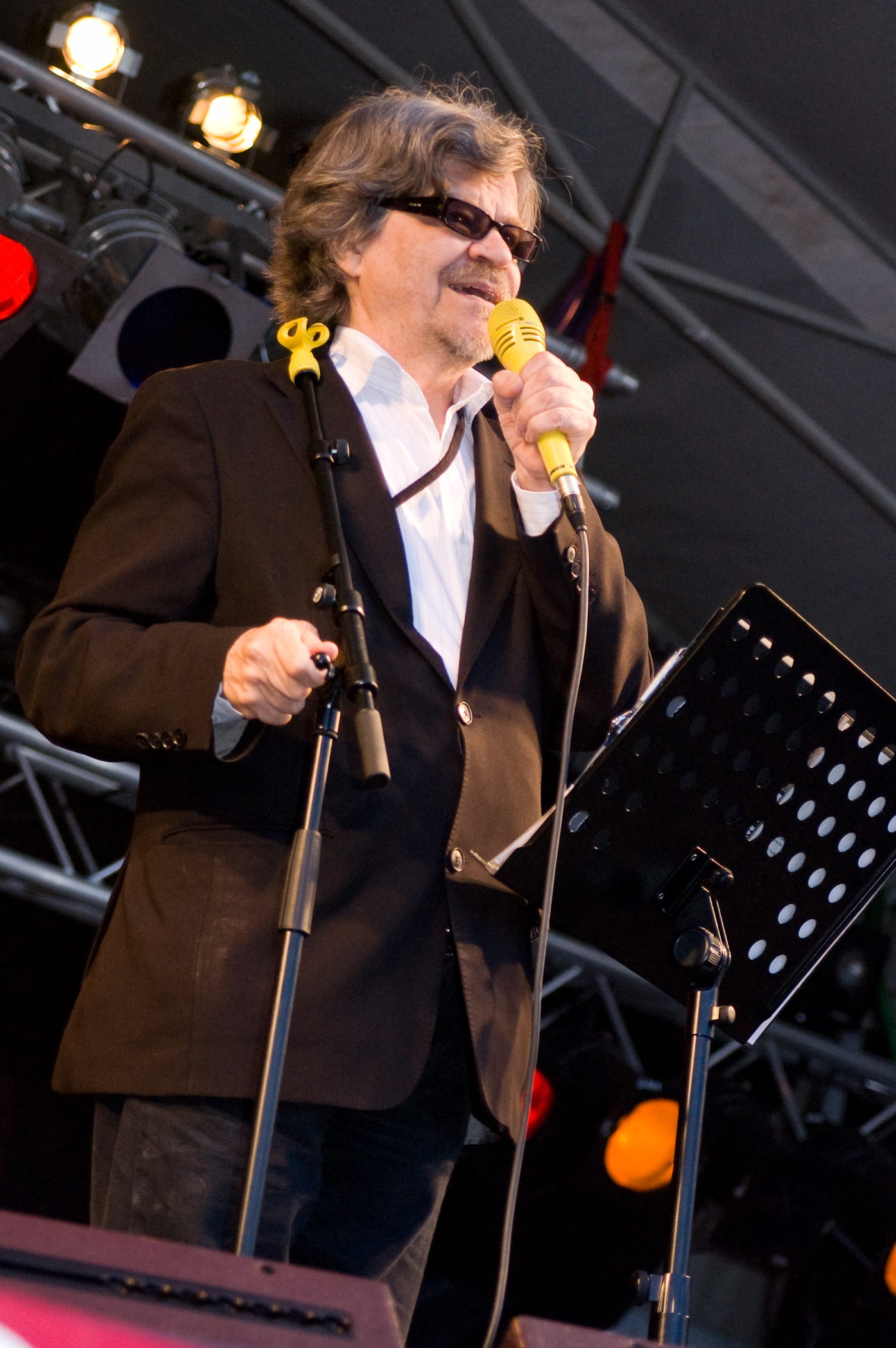
At the Ilosaarirock music festival in 2008

In the 1960s, Numminen was known particularly as an avantgarde, underground artist, stirring controversy with such songs as Nuoren aviomiehen on syytä muistaa ("What a young husband should remember"; the lyrics of the song were taken directly from a guide to newly married couples, and included advice on foreplay) and Naiseni kanssa eduskuntatalon puistossa ("With my woman at the parliament house's park"). He was a member of the band Suomen Talvisota 1939-1940. In his early days Numminen often successfully provoked people, for example with his interpretations of Franz Schubert's lieder, sung with his own idiosyncratically creaking voice, or creating a scandal at the Jyväskylän kesä festival of Jyväskylä in 1966 with song lyrics taken from a sex guide. Numminen composed music to the writings of the philosopher Ludwig Wittgenstein. In 1966, Numminen collaborated with Pekka Gronow to found the record label Eteenpäin! ("Forward!") to release Numminen's own music.

Numminen has been one of the unsung pioneers of Finnish electronic music. He is known for his collaborations with composer and inventor Erkki Kurenniemi who built him a "singing machine" Numminen used to participate in a singing contest in 1964, and an electronic instrument called Sähkökvartetti ("the Electric Quartet") in the late 1960s, the performance of which wreaked havoc in a youth festival in Sofia, Bulgaria. The Sähkökvartetti can be heard on Numminen's track 'Kaukana väijyy ystäviä' (1968).

In 1970 Numminen founded the jazz band Uusrahvaanomainen Jatsiorkesteri ("the Neo-Vulgar Jazz Orchestra") with pianist Jani Uhlenius, taking its cues from the 1920s–1940s jazz, swing, foxtrot, etc. Past members of the band include Aaro Kurkela, Kalevi Viitamäki, Jari Lappalainen and Heikki "Häkä" Virtanen. As of 2020, the band's line-up consists of Numminen, Uhlenius, accordion player Pedro Hietanen and contrabassist Pekka Sarmanto.

In the 2000s, Numminen made a return to electronic music and modern club sound. In 2003 Numminen started M.A.N. Scratch Band featuring his long-time collaborator Pedro Hietanen with young jazz musicians Olavi Uusivirta, Lasse Lindgren and DJ Santeri Vuosara (also known as DJ Sane). The duo M.A. Numminen & DJ Sane was started in 2004.

Numminen has appeared on Radio Suomi since 1984 together with playwright Juha Siltanen on their night show Yömyöhä.

In 1986 he published a book called Baarien mies ("The Man of the Bars") on Finnish keskiolut lager culture, for which he visited over 100 bars around Finland. The book had a considerable role in the birth of 1980s keskiolut beer culture in Finland.

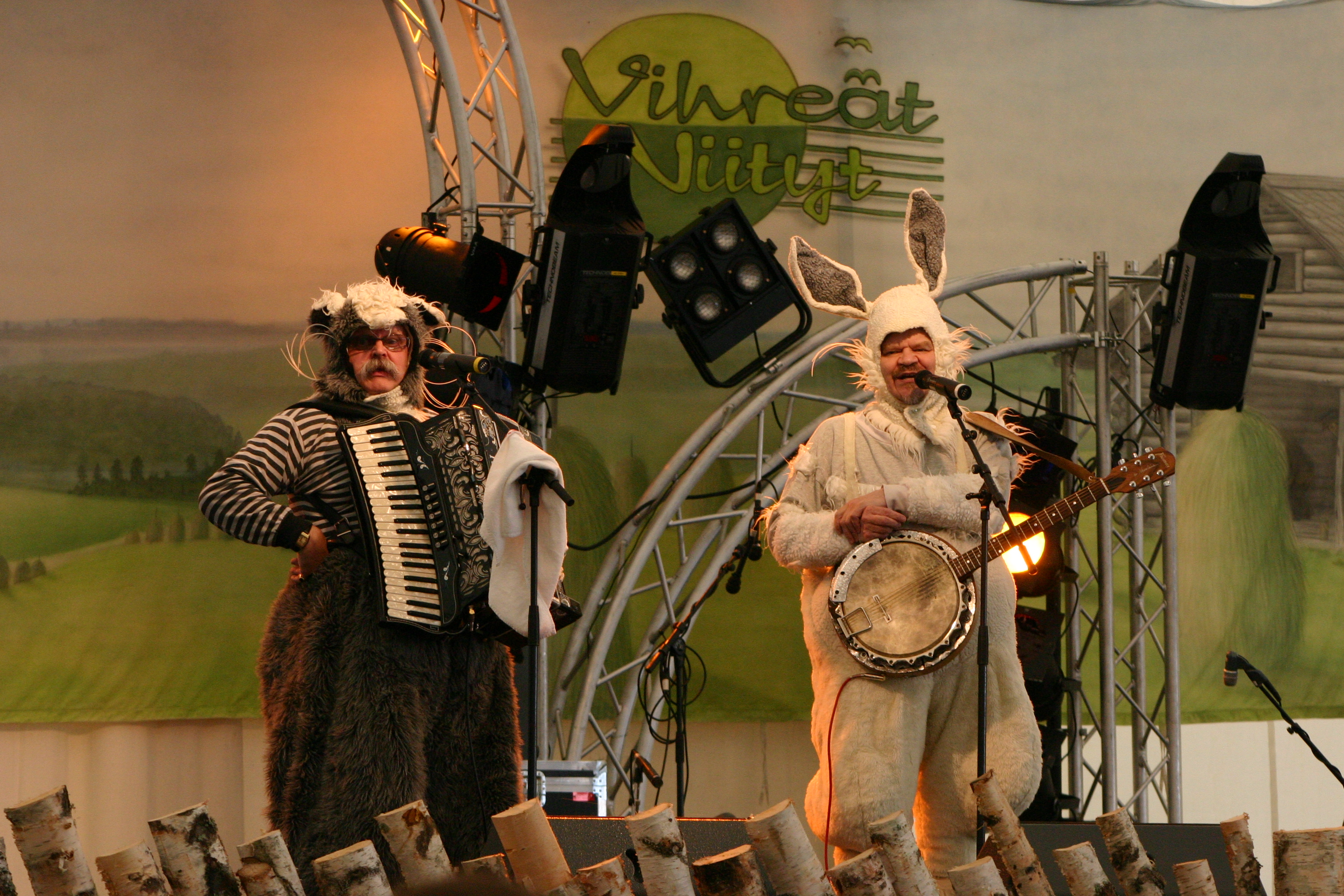
Numminen as the rabbit Gommi, and Pedro Hietanen as the cat Pommi in the Vihreät Niityt music festival, Kiuruvesi, 2004

His records, starting with the 1970 Suomen Talvisota 1939–1940 album Underground-Rock, were published under the umbrella of the legendary Finnish label Love Records. Numminen has recorded Swedish versions of many of his songs. His works also include several songs in English, German and Esperanto.

Numminen has taken part in many films, either as an actor, scriptwriter, composer, singer, or short film director.

=== Children's songs ===
In the 1970s, Numminen became a popular favourite with his children's songs in the 1973 film Herra Huu – Jestapa Jepulis, Penikat Sipuliks, where he also played the main role, and in the 1977 TV series Jänikset maailmankartalle where he played a rabbit named Gommi, and his friend Pedro Hietanen played a cat named Pommi. At the same time, Numminen also gained success in Sweden with his song 'Gummiboll' (Numminen's Finnish version of this was called 'Kumipallona luokses pompin ain', and is an interpretation of the song "Rubber Ball" by Bobby Vee).

=== Setting Wittgenstein to music ===
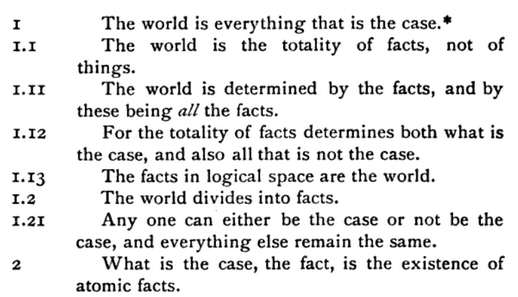
Start of Tractatus Logico-Philosophicus by Ludwig Wittgenstein, 1922. Numminen set parts of the work to music in 1989.

In 1989 Numminen released the vinyl album The Tractatus Suite, consisting of extracts from the philosopher Ludwig Wittgenstein's Tractatus Logico-Philosophicus set to music, on the Forward! label (GN-95). The album was recorded at Finnvox Studios in Helsinki between February and June 1989. The "lyrics" (quotations from the Tractatus) were provided in German, English, Esperanto, French, Finnish and Swedish. The music was reissued as a CD in 2003, M.A. Numminen sings Wittgenstein. The songs include Wovon man nicht sprechen kann, darüber muss man schweigen (On what one cannot speak about, one must be silent), to the tune of a German marching song, accompanied by the Sohon Torwet brass band.

In 2019, Numminen sang Wittgenstein, accompanied by the pianist Claes Olsson, at the Berlinale International Film Festival.

== Personal life ==
Numminen's first wife was Sirpa Kuosa. They divorced, and he married Helena Vapaa.

== Honours and distinctions ==
In 2005 the Aleksis Kiven Seura society gave Numminen the Esko Wood Award.

In 2011, Åbo Akademi University conferred Numminen an honorary doctorate in political science for his bridge-building between art and science, and between Finland's Finnish and Swedish speakers.

In 2014, the University of Helsinki gave him an honorary doctorate in philosophy.

Numminen won the 2023 Juha Vainio Lyricist Award for his early influence on Finnish rock music. In 2024 he was elected to the Finnish Music Hall of Fame.

== Discography ==
=== Original records ===
Numminen has recorded music in Finnish, Swedish, German and English as follows:

- M. A. Numminen In memoriam (Eteenpäin! 1967)
- Suomen Talvisota 1939–1940: Underground-Rock (Love Records 1970)
- Taisteluni (Love Records 1970)
- Swingin kutsu (Love Records 1970)
- Iso mies ja keijukainen (Love Records 1970)
- Perkele! Lauluja Suomesta (Love Records 1971)
- Niemisen pojat ja naapurin äijä – Suutari Joonaksen iltapäivä, osa II (Love Records 1971)
- Joulupukin juhannusyö – M.A. Nummisen ja hänen ystäviensä joululauluja (Love Records 1971)
- M.A. Numminen på svenska – Äkta finsk negerjazz på svenska (Love Records 1972)
- Olen nähnyt Helga-neidin kylvyssä (Love Records 1972)
- Haren satt i gropen i Finland (Love Records 1973)
- Aarteeni, juokaamme likööri! (Love Records 1973)
- Sateenkaarilipun alla (Love Records 1973)
- Jestapa jepulis! – Herra Huun ihmeelliset seikkailut (Love Records 1973)
- M.A. Numminen in English (Love Records 1974)
- Jag har sett fröken Ellen i badet (Love Records 1974)
- Auf Deutsch (Love Records 1976)
- Kumipallona luokses pompin ain' (Love Records 1976)
- Som en gummiboll kommer jag tillbaks till dej (Love Records 1977)
- Fårskallevisor (Love Records 1978)
- M.A. Numminen, Sinikka Sokka & Seppo Hovi: Jänikset maailmankartalle! (Love Records 1978)
- Itsy Bitsy ja muita taidenautintoja (EMI 1979)
- Itsy Bitsy och andra konstupplevelser (Columbia Records 1979)
- Soi, sieluni, soi! (CBS Records 1980)
- Kuu mies kookospähkinä (EMI 1980)
- Månen mannen kokosnöten (EMI 1980)
- Silmälasiapina (Johanna 1983)
- Helena est libertas (Johanna 1983)
- Koomikon kahdet kasvot (Johanna 1984)
- M. A. Nummisen suosituimmat lastenlaulut (EMI 1985)
- Den flygande mannen (EMI 1985)
- Kamelilaulu (EMI 1988)
- The Tractatus Suite (Eteenpäin! 1989)
- Ollaan eläimiä (EMI 1991)
- Underground Rock Orchestra: Suomi nyt(t) (Eteenpäin! 1993)
- M.A. Numminen Goes Tech-No – Jag vill inte vara prinsessa (Olarin Musiikki 1995)
- M.A. Numminen Goes Tech-No – En tahdo olla prinsessa (Olarin Musiikki 1995)
- Gommin ja Pommin metsäkarnevaali (Fazer Records 1995)
- Rytmirunoja (CD & kirja) (Rockadillo 2002)
- M.A. Numminen & Sanna Pietiäinen und Das Neorustikale Tango-Orchester: Finnischer Tango (Trikont 2003)
- M.A. Numminen singt wüste wilde Weihnachtslieder (Zweitausendeins Versand 2003)
- Didi-WAH-Didi (Zen Master Records / Rockadillo 2004)
- Singt Heinrich Heine (Trikont 2006)
- M.A. Numminen gör ont i Sverige (Rockadillo 2008)

=== Compilations ===
- Uudet lastenlaulut 1 (1974)
- M.A. Nummisen suosituimmat (1974)
- M.A. Nummisen 60-luku (1985)
- Den flygande mannen (EMI 1985)
- The Tractatus Suite (Forward! 1989)
- Klassikot – Ne Parhaat (Castle Finland 1990)
- Den eviga årgången – M.A. Numminens bästa (Amigo 1990)
- Suosituimmat lastenlaulut (EMI 1998)
- Kiusankappaleita 1: 1966–70 (Siboney Records 2000)
- Kiusankappaleita 2: 1973–88 (Siboney 2001)
- Kiusankappaleita 3: 1989–2001 (Siboney 2001)
- Dägä Dägä Finnwelten (Trikont 2001)
- Valtava Jänis – Gommin ja Pommin kaikki seikkailut (EMI 2002)
- Suomihuiput – lastenlaulut (EMI 2005)
- M.A. Numminen sings Wittgenstein (Zweitausendeins EFA SP 142 2003)
- Tunnelmassa – M.A.Nummisen Uusrahvaanomaisen Jatsiorkesterin parhaat (Love Records 2012)

== Filmography ==
Numminen's many film appearances include:

- 1963 Tiiliseinä
- 1963 Vesilasi
- 1973 Herra Huu - jestapa jepulis - penikat sipuliks
- 1993 M. A. Numminen Sings Wittgenstein; music video; Panorama
- 1995 M. A. Numminen Goes Tech-No; music video
- 1997 M. A. Numminen Meets Schubert; music video
- 2000 M. A. Numminen Turns Rabbit; music video
- 2013 M. A. Numminen in der Sauna (M. A. Numminen in the Sauna); music video

== Bibliography ==
- 1970 Kauneimmat runot (The Most Beautiful Poems)
- 1971 Lastuja
- 1975 Satuja (Fairy Tales)
- 1977 Jänikset maailmankartalle! Seikkailukertomus lapsille (Rabbits on the world map! Adventure story for children)
- 1978 Discreet Debaucheries
- 1981 Tales and Un-tales
- 1981Terässinfonia (Steel Symphony) (with Esa Saarinen)
- 1983 Passio Libertatis
- 1986 Baarien mies (Bar Man)
- 1987 Kirjeitä virolaiselle runoilijalle (Letters to an Estonian Poet)
- 1991 Etsivätoimisto Andrejev & Milton (Detective Agency Andreyev & Milton) (with Markku Into)
- 1998 Tango on intohimoni (Tango is my passion)
- 1999 Helsinkiin (To Helsinki)
- 2001 Der Weihnachtsmann schlägt zurück (Father Christmas Strikes Back)
- 2002 Naapuri (Neighbour) (with Markku Into and Jarkko Laine)
- 2003 Rehtorin päiväkirja – Interaktiivinen kalenteri vuodelle 2004 (The Principal's Diary - Interactive Calendar for 2004)
- 2016 Jazzin meining (The Meaning of Jazz)
- 2020 Kaukana väijyy ystäviä – Muistelmat I (Friends Lurk Far Away - Memoirs I)
- 2021 On syytä muistaa – Muistelmat II (It is Worth Remembering - Memoirs II)

== Sources ==
- Gronow, Pekka (2006). "Numminen, Mauri Antero (1940–)". Finnish National Biography, Volume 7 (in Finnish). Helsinki: Finnish Literature Society. pp. 202–203. ISBN 951-746-448-7.
