= Helena Anhava =

Finnish writer and translator (1925–2018)

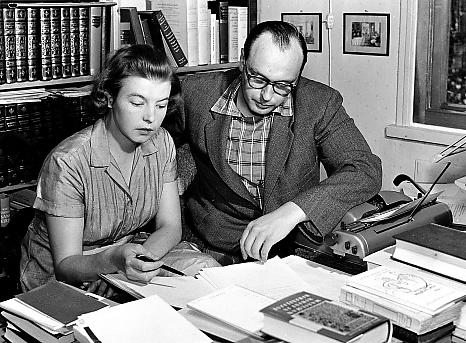
- Poet Helena Anhava with husband Tuomas Anhava
- Born: 24 October 1925; Helsinki, Finland
- Died: 24 November 2018 (aged 93); Helsinki, Finland
- Occupations: Poet, Author and Translator .
- Honours: State Literature Prize Recognition Award of the Finnish Writers' Union Alfred Kordelin Foundation Award Samuli Paronen Award

Ruth Helena Anhava (24 October 1925 – 24 November 2018) was a prolific Finnish poet, author and translator. Her translations include novels, plays, lyrics and dozens of auditions.

== Biography ==
She was born Ruth Helena Pohjanpää on 24 October 1925, in Helsinki. Her father, Lauri Pohjanpää, was a poet, theologian and teacher.

Her husband was Tuomas Anhava (1927-2001), a poet, translator, essayist and publisher. The couple had four children; the best known was their son, Martti Anhava (b.1955), a Finnish writer, translator and journalist.

Helena Anhava graduated from high school in 1944 and graduated in librarianship in 1952. From 1947 to 1952, she worked at Werner Söderström Osakeyhtiö, a Finnish publisher of general literature. From 1952 on, she was a Finnish translator.

=== Writings ===
Anhava was said to have contributed to the short story anthology Seven Short Stories in 1968. Her first poetry collection, Sorrowful Hearts Must Speak Quietly appeared in 1971, and one of her last collection was published in 2010 when she was more than 80 years old.

Through her work, Anhava took pains to defend middle-class values as well as the fundamental desire for self-protection. Schoolfield has categorized Anhava as a "poet of outstanding stature and permanent worth." He writes that her poetry "speaks for the family, the sensitive human being, and the private life from a mother's perspective." He goes on to speculate that her work might reflect the childhood of a middle-class family whose life was terribly shaken by the events of World War II during the writer's "youthful years."

She published poetry collections, aphorisms, short stories, including Kun on nuorin (When one is youngest, 1985), hearing games and children's books. The themes exhibited in her work often reflect the change of time and conflicts between the generations.

=== Other projects ===
In addition to poems, Anhava published aphorisms, short story collections, children's books, and auditions, and she translated novels, plays, auditions, children's and youth books and lyrics. She also edited textbooks, anthologies and poetry collections.

For the 1977 Finnish television film titled Climber, she was credited as an English language writer.

== Death ==
She died in Helsinki, 24 November 2018, at the age of 93.

Anhava's poems have been translated most commonly into Swedish, Norwegian and Estonian languages.

== Selected works ==
According to worldcat.org, 93 of her works can be found in 255 publications in 4 languages in libraries worldwide.

- We need to speak quietly when we hear sadly. Poems. Helsinki: Ottawa, 1971. ISBN 951-1-00279-1.
- Turn words. Poems. Helsinki: Ottawa, 1973. ISBN 951-1-00685-1.
- Ask yourself silence. Poems. Helsinki: Ottawa, 1974. ISBN 951-1-01685-7.
- Flank. Thinking. Aphorisms. Helsinki: Ottawa, 1976. ISBN 951-1-04098-7.
- Slow part. Poems. Helsinki: Ottawa, 1979. ISBN 951-1-05575-5.
- I still say. Poetry, talk. Poems, aphorisms. Helsinki: Ottawa, 1982. ISBN 951-1-07148-3.
- When is the youngest. Short stories. Helsinki: Ottawa, 1985. ISBN 951-1-08654-5.
- New old acquaintance. Children's book. Illustration: Heljä Lassila. Helsinki: Ottawa, 1985. ISBN 951-1-08579-4.
- Light. Poems. Helsinki: Ottawa, 1988. ISBN 951-1-10347-4.
- Poems 1971-1990 . Collected poems. Helsinki: Ottawa, 1990. ISBN 951-1-09615-X.
- There is nothing for life. Reports. Helsinki: Ottawa, 1995. ISBN 951-1-12390-4.
- Mention before the wave. Poems. Helsinki: Ottawa, 1997. ISBN 951-1-15195-9.
- Nobody's Country: The Mind, Found 1971-1999. Knit aphorism. Helsinki: Ottawa, 2000. ISBN 951-1-16646-8.
- The time of desolation. Poems. Helsinki: Ottawa, 2003. ISBN 951-1-18637-X.
- Deliver your house. Memory traces . Memoirs. Helsinki: Ottawa, 2006. ISBN 951-1-21347-4.
- Nobody knows. Poems. Helsinki: Ottawa, 2008. ISBN 978-951-1-23091-5.
- I only sleep there: poems 1991–2010. Collected poems. Helsinki: Ottawa, 2010. ISBN 978-951-1-24816-3

== Selected awards ==
- Grand Finnish Book Club Recognition Award, 1979
- State Literature Prize, 1980
- Recognition Award of the Finnish Writers' Union, 1994
- Alfred Kordelin Foundation Award, 1997
- Recognition Award of the Great Finnish Book Club, 2001
- Samuli Paronen Award, 2006
