= Tuomas Anhava =

Finnish writer (1927–2001)

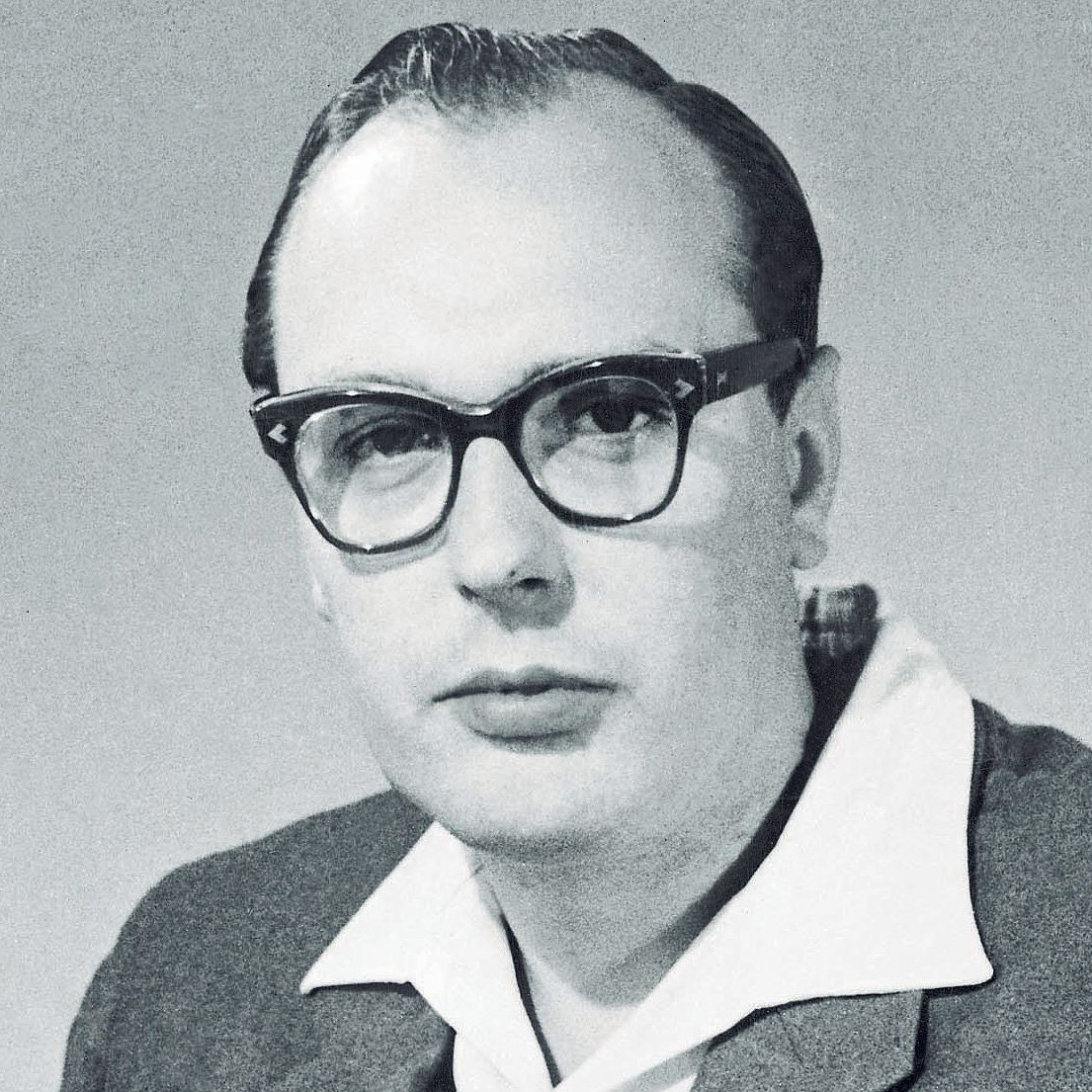
Tuomas Anhava in 1957.

Tuomas Anhava (5 June 1927, Helsinki – 22 January 2001, Helsinki) was a Finnish writer and recipient of the Eino Leino Prize in 1989.

Anhava's works closely follow the mold of modernist tradition of Ezra Pound and T. S. Eliot. Anhava was a meticulous poet, always striving for a perfection in his verses. He was obsessed with the method of poetry and had an inclination toward the aesthetics of modern poetry. His Runoja, meaning Poems, came out in 1953. It dealt with alienation and a quest for transcending everyday reality. As if to test himself as well as the technicalities of the modern poem, Anhava wrote the technically difficult poems of 36 runoja 36 Poems in 1958. The poems closely resemble the Japanese and Chinese poetry that Anhava had translated during the same period. Anhava went to apply his acquaintance with the simplification and compression of Oriental epigrams in his later works like Runoja (1961) and Kuudes kirja The Sixth Book (1966).

Anhava never attained any significant literary height with his poetry. Nevertheless, he is credited and revered for the great impact he had on Finnish poets (and by extension on Finnish poetry), which was a result of his unwavering devotion to attaining aesthetic perfection. In the period 1966–1979 Anhava was the editor-in-chief of the literary magazine Parnasso.

He was married to the poet, writer and translator Helena (Pohjanpää) Anhava (1925–2018).

He is buried in the Hietaniemi Cemetery in Helsinki.
