= List of Finnish composers =

This is an alphabetical list of composers from Finland.

== A–H ==
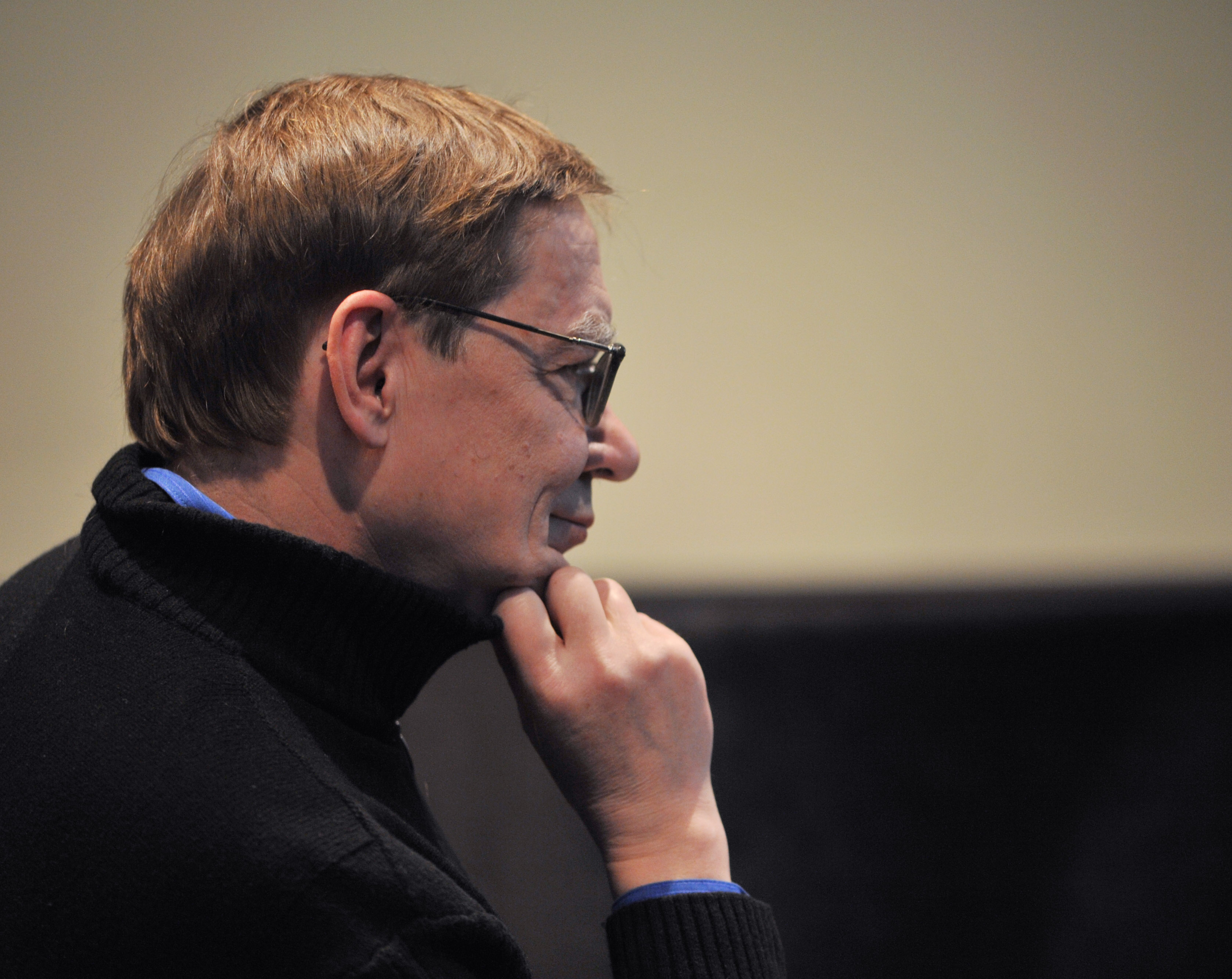
Aho

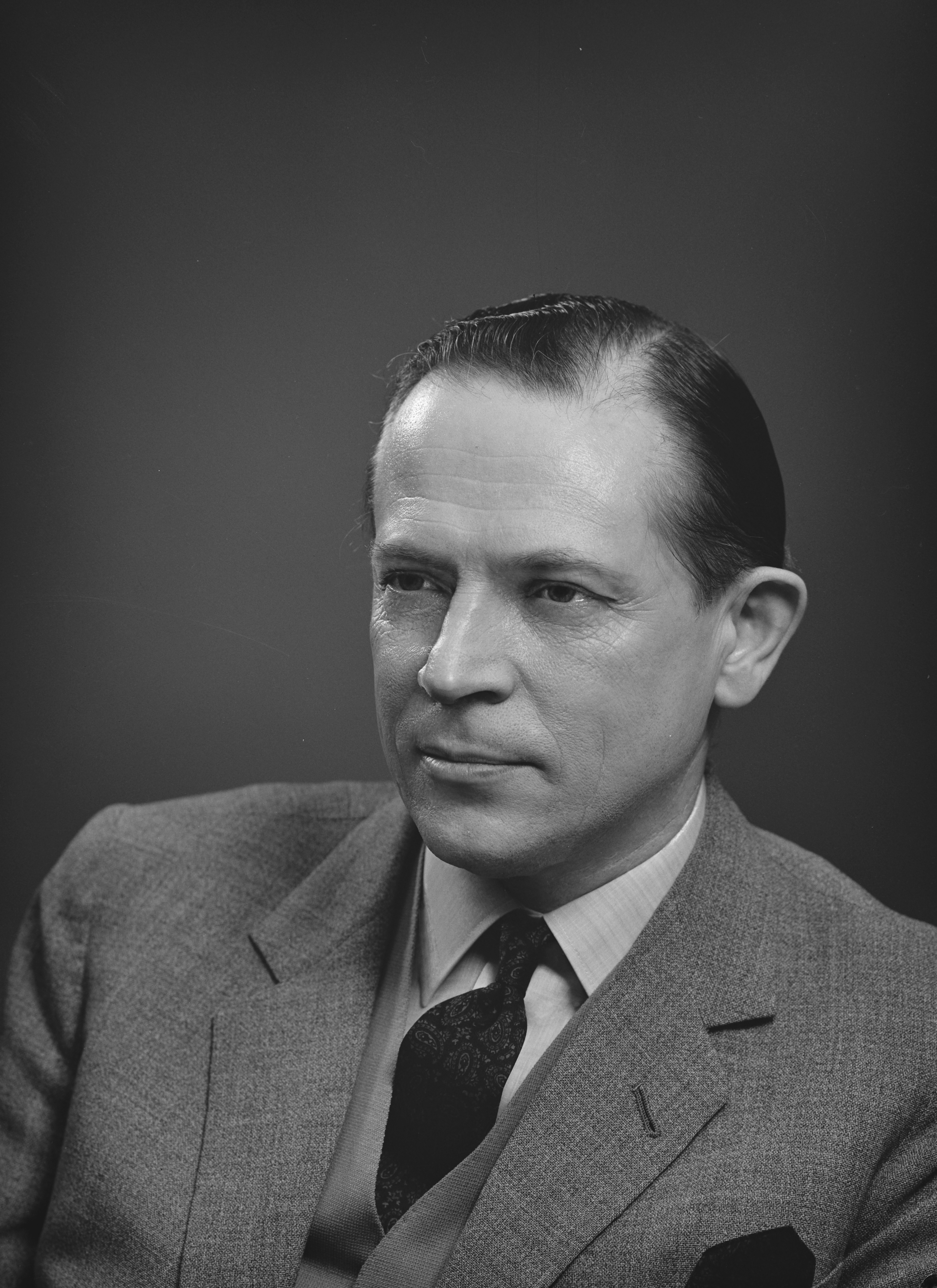
Bergman

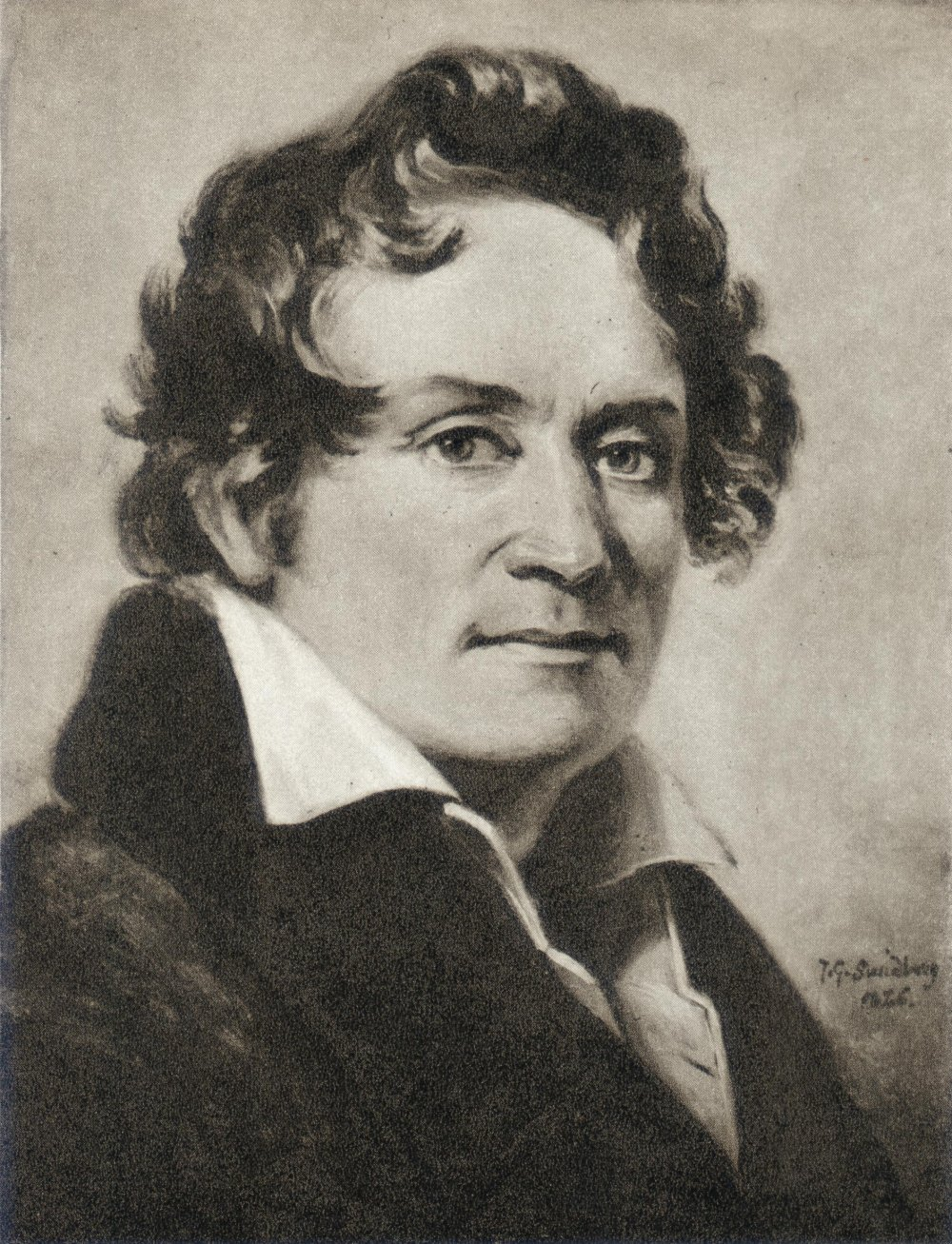
Crusell

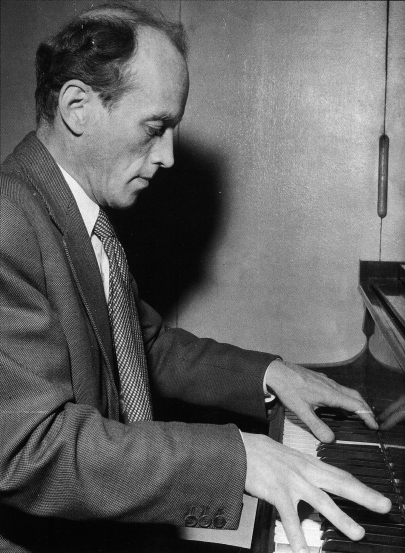
Englund

- Kalevi Aho (born 1949)
- Timo Alakotila (born 1959)
- Erik Bergman (1911–2006)
- Thomas Byström (1772–1839)
- Karl Collan (1828–1871)
- Bernhard Crusell (1775–1838)
- Cecilia Damström (born 1988)
- Einar Englund (1916–1999)
- Richard Faltin (1835–1918)
- Karl Flodin (1858–1925)
- Nils-Eric Fougstedt (1910–1961)
- George de Godzinsky (1914–1994)
- Ralf Gothóni (born 1946)
- Sampo Haapamäki (born 1979)
- Kimmo Hakola (born 1958)
- Kassu Halonen (born 1953)
- Kalervo Hämäläinen (1917–2015)
- Eero Hämeenniemi (born 1951)
- Pekka Juhani Hannikainen (1854–1924)
- Ilmari Hannikainen (1892–1955)
- Väinö Hannikainen (1900–1960)
- Teppo Hauta-aho (1941–2021)
- Paavo Heininen (1938–2022)
- Mikko Heiniö (born 1948)
- Martti Hela (1890–1965)
- Reino Helismaa (1913–1965)
- Perttu Hietanen (born 1950)
- Carl Hirn (1886–1949)

== I–K ==
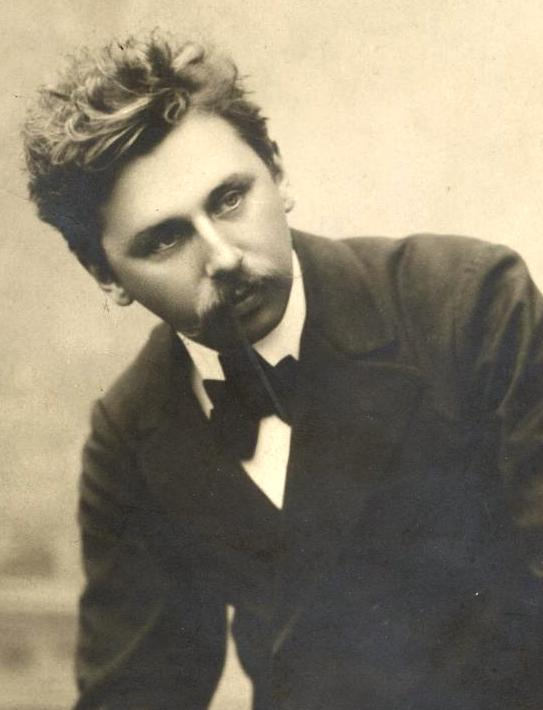
Järnefelt

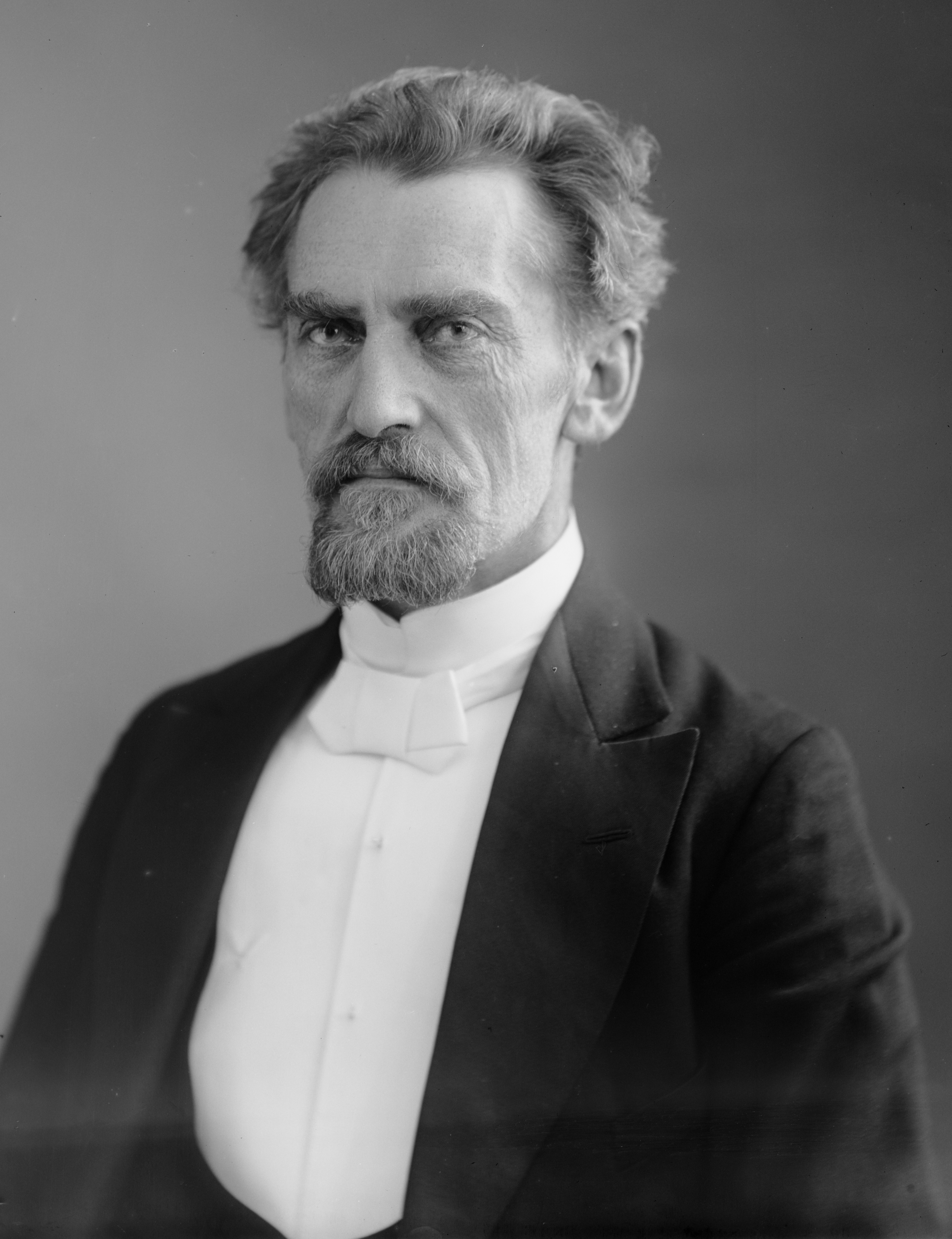
Kajanus

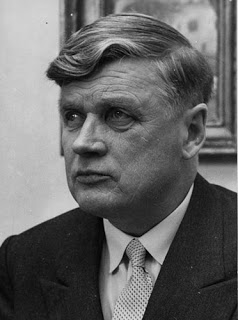
Klami

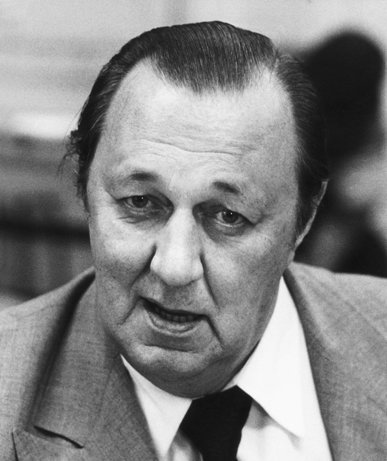
Kokkonen

- Pertti Jalava (born 1960)
- Kai Jämsä
- Armas Järnefelt (1869–1958)
- Arto Järvelä (born 1964)
- Erkki Jokinen (born 1941)
- Konsta Jylhä (1910–1984)
- Jouni Kaipainen (1956–2015)
- Robert Kajanus (1856–1933)
- Maria Kalaniemi (born 1964)
- Kari Karjalainen (born 1953)
- Toivo Kärki (1915–1992)
- Heino Kaski (1885–1957)
- Kauko Käyhkö (1916–1983)
- Usko Kemppi (1907–1994)
- Yrjö Kilpinen (1892–1959)
- Uuno Klami (1900–1961)
- Joonas Kokkonen (1921–1996)
- Juhani Komulainen (born 1953)
- Olli Kortekangas (born 1955)
- Axel von Kothen (1871–1927)
- Otto Kotilainen (1868–1936)
- Felix Krohn (1898–1963)
- Toivo Kuula (1883–1918)
- Ilkka Kuusisto (1933–2025)
- Taneli Kuusisto (1905–1988)

== L–O ==
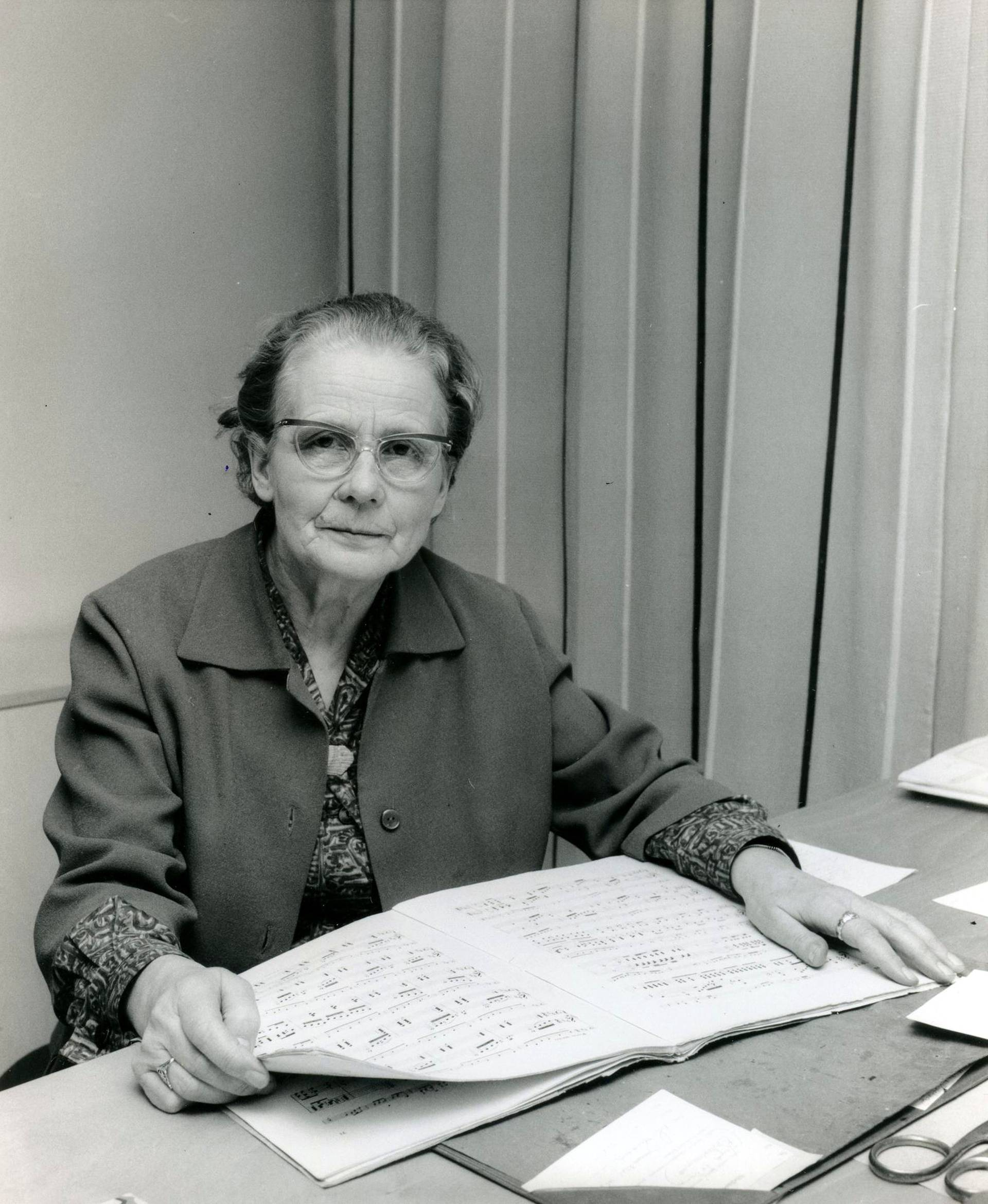
Leiviskä

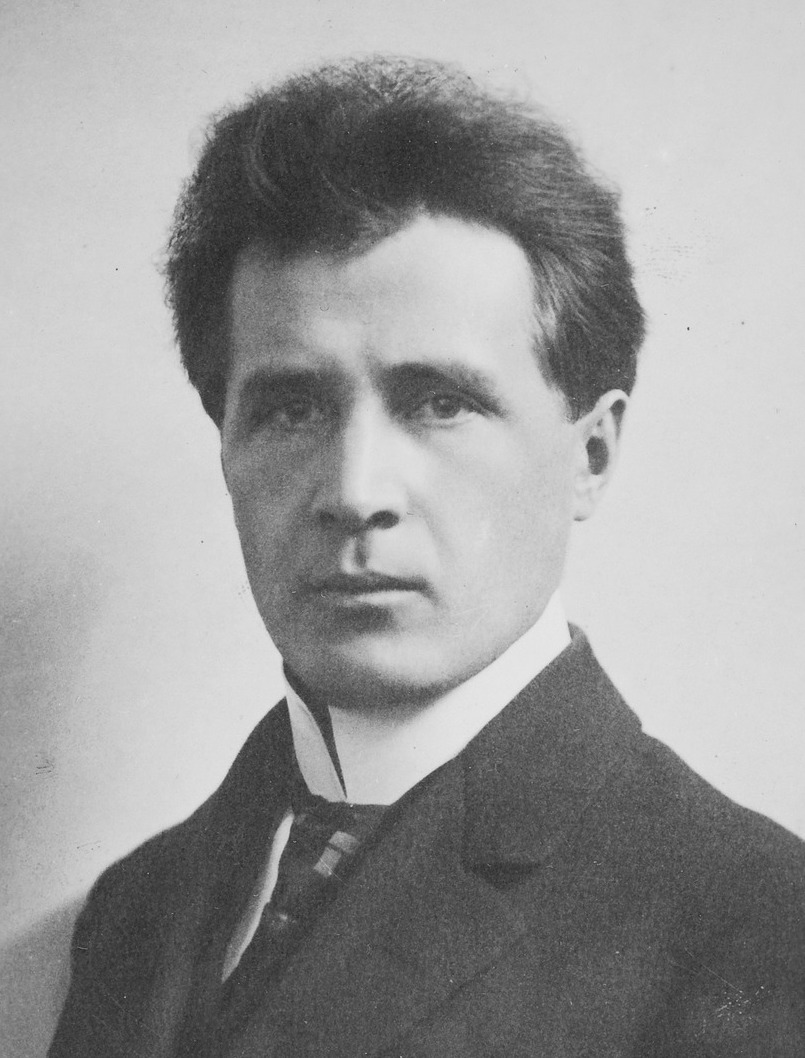
Madetoja

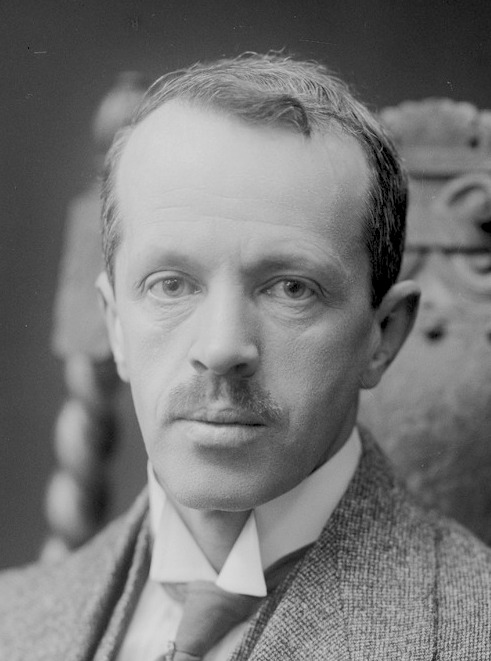
Melartin

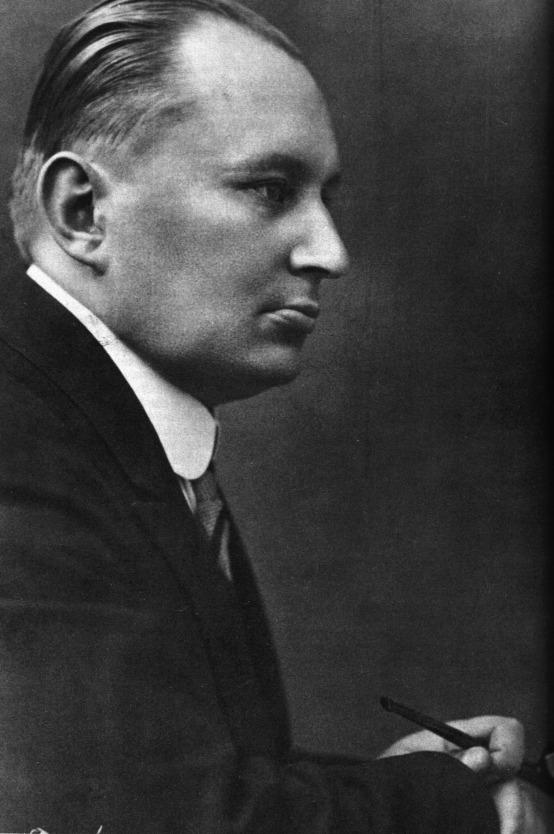
A. Merikanto

- Armas Launis (1884–1959)
- Helvi Leiviskä (1902–1982)
- Magnus Lindberg (born 1958)
- Ernst Linko (1889-1960)
- Gabriel Linsén (1838–1914)
- Armas Maasalo (1885–1960)
- Leevi Madetoja (1887–1947)
- Georg Malmstén (1902–1981)
- Jaakko Mäntyjärvi (born 1963)
- Tauno Marttinen (1912–2008)
- Einari Marvia (1915–1997)
- Erkki Melartin (1875–1937)
- Aarre Merikanto (1893–1958)
- Oskar Merikanto (1868–1924)
- Usko Meriläinen (1930–2004)
- Ernst Mielck (1877–1899)
- Unto Mononen (1930–1968)

== P–R ==
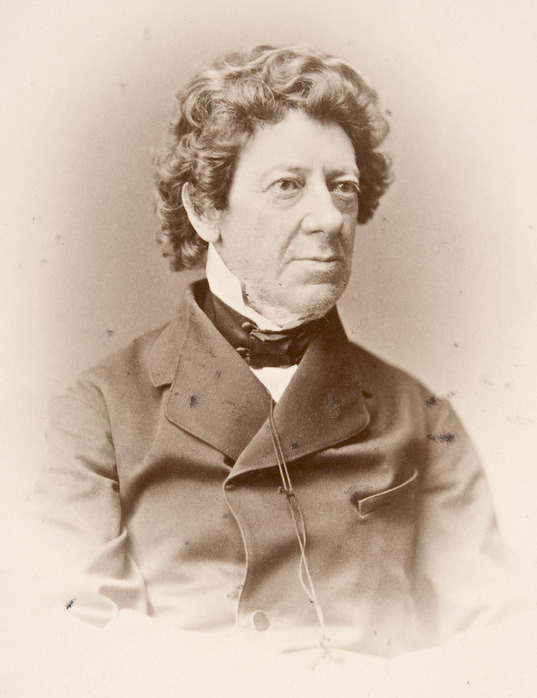
Pacius

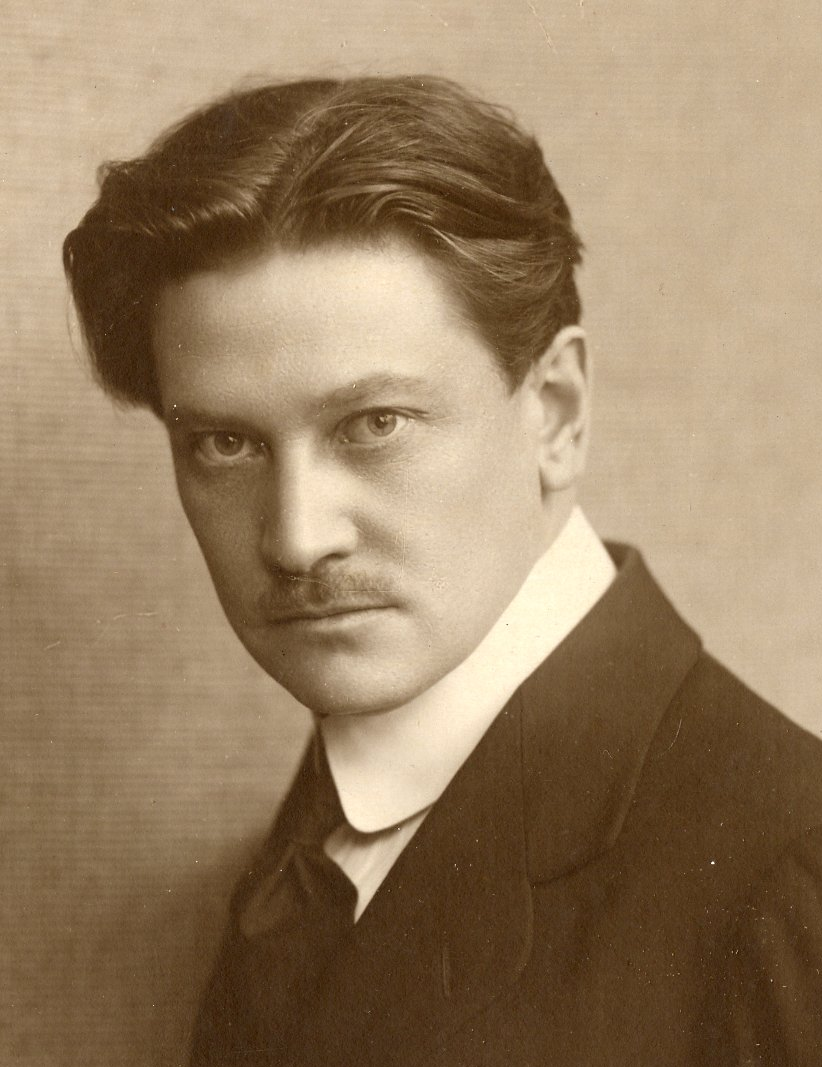
Palmgren

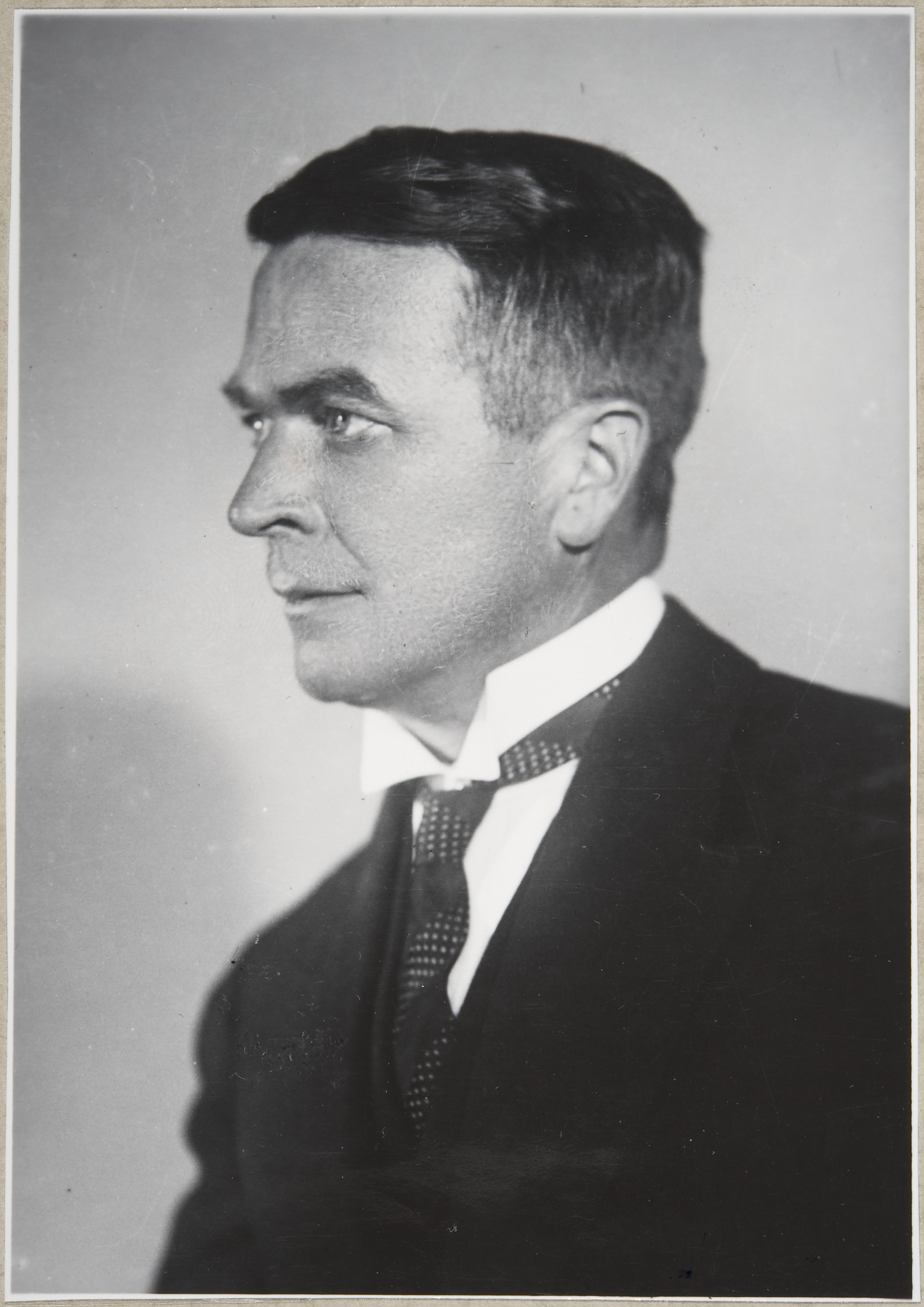
Raitio

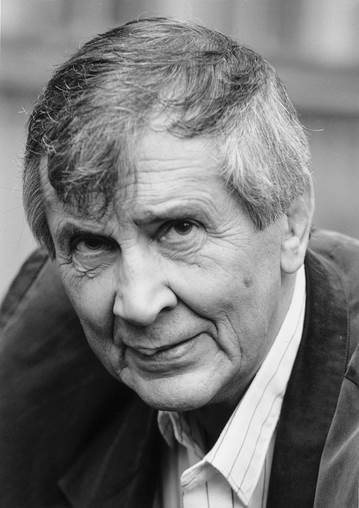
Rautavaara

- Fredrik Pacius (1809–1891)
- Selim Palmgren (1878–1951)
- Olavi Pesonen (1909–1993)
- Ernest Pingoud (1887–1942)
- Mika Pohjola (born 1971)
- Veli-Matti Puumala (born 1965)
- Uljas Pulkkis (born 1975)
- Tauno Pylkkänen (1918–1980)
- Osmo Tapio Räihälä (born 1964)
- Tomi Räisänen (born 1976)
- Sulho Ranta (1901–1960)
- Matti Rautio (1922–1986)
- Väinö Raitio (1891–1945)
- Einojuhani Rautavaara (1928–2016)
- Diana Ringo (born 1992)

== S–Z ==
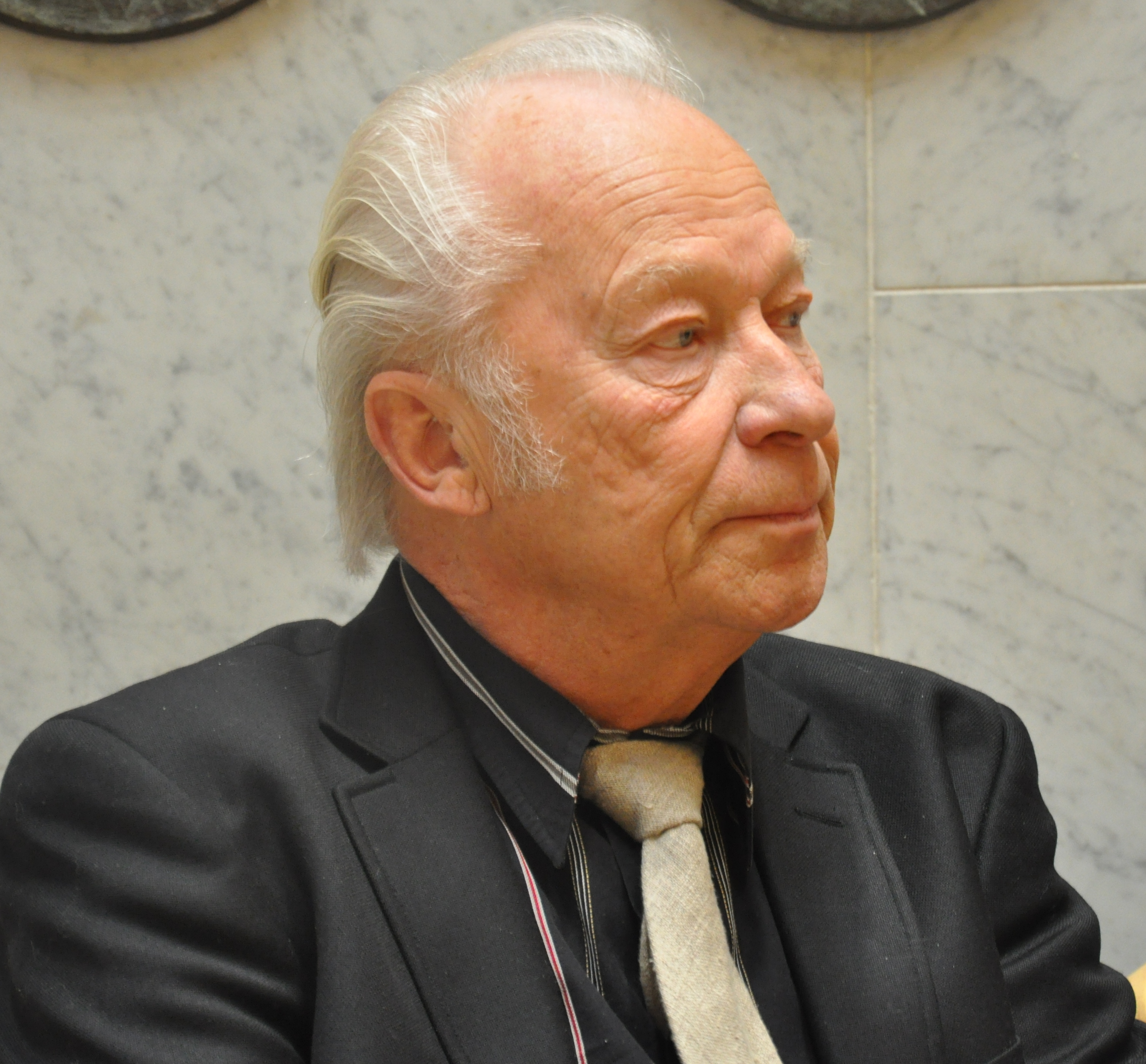
Sallinen

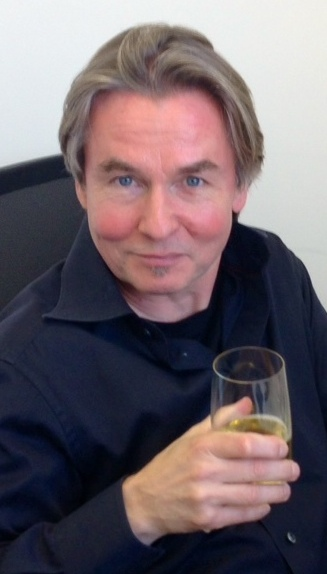
Salonen

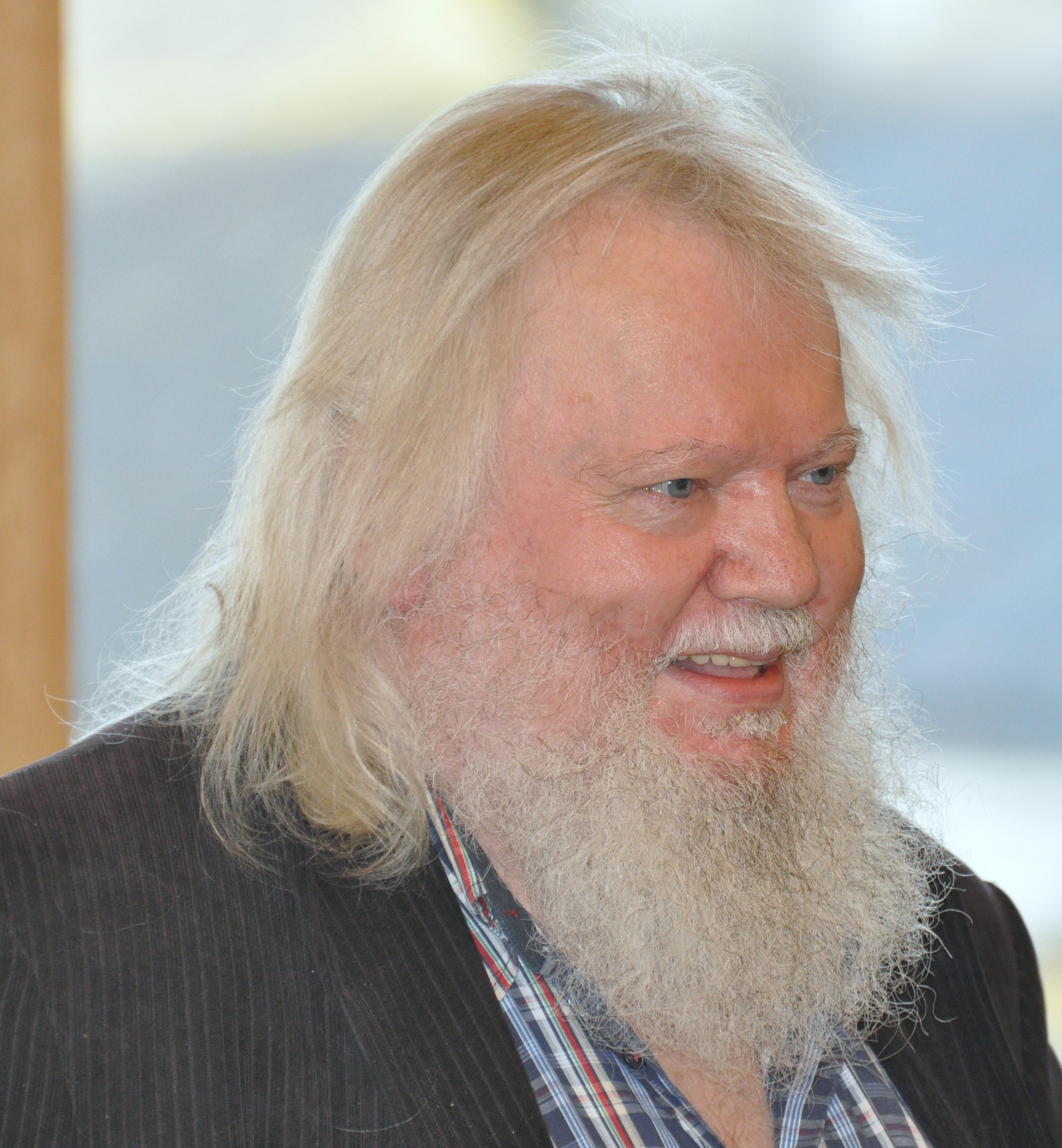
Segerstam

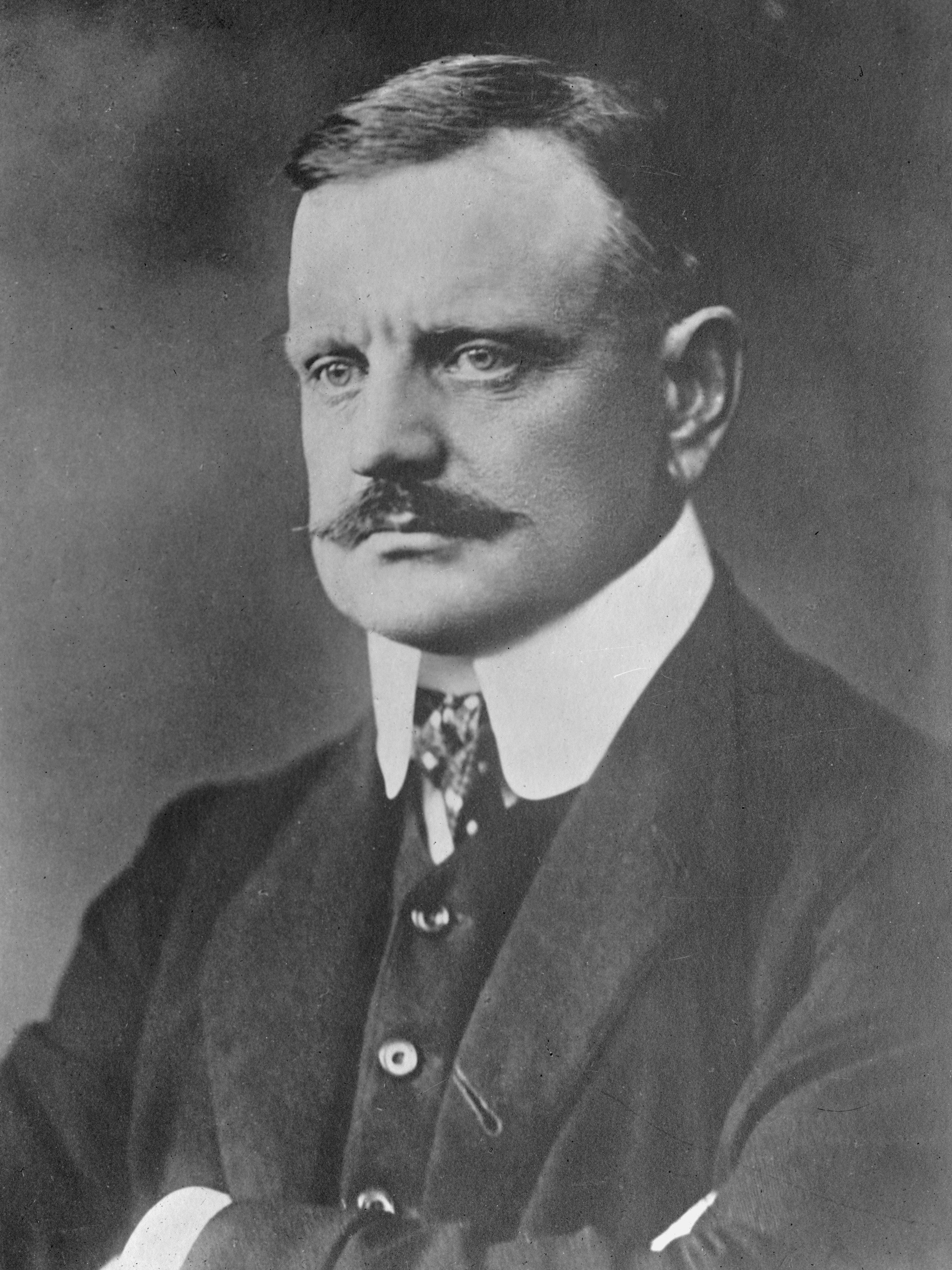
Sibelius

- Toivo Saarenpää (1882–1948)
- Kaija Saariaho (1952–2023)
- Aulis Sallinen (born 1935)
- Erkki Salmenhaara (1941–2002)
- Esa-Pekka Salonen (born 1958)
- Leif Segerstam (1944-2024)
- Jean Sibelius (1865–1957)
- Pekka Simojoki (born 1958)
- Edith Sohlström (1870–1934)
- Jouni Somero (born 1963)
- Heikki Suolahti (1920–1936)
- Evert Suonio (1871–1934)
- Jukka Tiensuu (born 1948)
- Eicca Toppinen (born 1975)
- Erik Tulindberg (1761–1814)
- Martti Turunen (born 1940)
- Pentti Tynkkynen (1943–2023)
- Filip von Schantz (1835–1865)
- Aarni Voipio (1891–1965)
- Martin Wegelius (1846–1906)
- Taisto Wesslin (1941–2010)
- Sauli Zinovjev (born 1988)

== See also ==
- List of composers
