= Bachler =

Bachler is a surname. Notable people with the surname include:

- Benjamin Bachler (born 1994), Austrian footballer
- Klaus Bachler (born 1991), Austrian race driver
- Lee Aaron Bachler (1925–1979), American politician, Missouri senator
- Reinhold Bachler (born 1944), Austrian ski-jumper
- Thomas Bachler (born 1965), Austrian bobsledder

== See also ==
- Baechler, another surname
