= Maria Kalaniemi =

Finnish musician

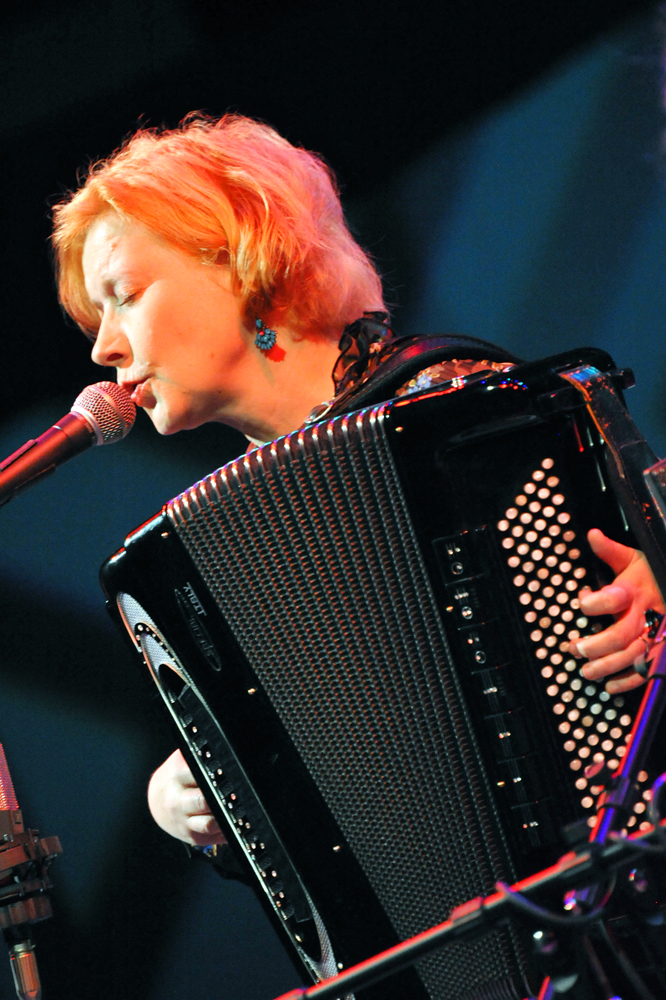
Maria Kalaniemi performing in Warszawa during Cross Culture Festival 2011

Maria Kalaniemi (born 27 May 1964 in Espoo, Finland) is a Finnish accordionist. She was classically trained, gaining her MMus from the Sibelius Academy in 1992, but has become mostly known as a folk musician having played this music from childhood, besides her classical music studies, and also at the folk music department of the Sibelius Academy.

== Groups ==
Ensembles she is or has been involved with are:

- Niekku, formed during the years at the Sibelius Academy: before they disbanded, they recorded three albums.
- Aldargaz, also formed at the Sibelius Academy including fiddler Arto Järvelä, pianist Timo Alakotila, mandolinist Petri Hakala, guitarist Olli Varis and Tapani Varis. The group made their last recording in 1999.
- A duo consisting of her and Timo Alakotila, that recorded the album Ambra.
- Maria Kalaniemi Trio, extending the duo with Olli Varis. Both the duo and the trio play traditional tunes, popular Finnish tunes from about the mid-20th century as well as new material by Kalaniemi and Alakotila. The trio released a live CD recorded in Tokyo, Tokyo concert, that partly contains the same tunes as Ambra.
- Accordion Tribe, an international accordion group consisting of Kalaniemi, Guy Klucevsek from the United States, Bratko Bibic from Slovenia, Lars Hollmer from Sweden and Otto Lechner from Austria
- Unto Tango Orchestra (Tango-Orkesteri Unto) with Pirjo Aittomäki (vocals), Timo Alakotila, Petri Hakala (guitar), Mauno Järvelä (violin) and Hannu Rantanen (double bass). The group was formed to perform at one particular occasion, and later released a CD that outside of Finland is sold as Finnish tango.
- Helsinki Melodeon Ladies
- Ramunder, a Swedish-speaking project with the singer Anna-Kaisa Liedes and the fiddler Marianne Maans

She has also worked and recorded with the Swedish fiddler Sven Ahlbäck, the popular Finnish singer Katri Helena, the singer/actor/flautist Vesa-Matti Loiri, the Finnish accordionist Kimmo Pohjonen and many others. In 2004, she was the special guest at a concert in London with the BBC Concert Orchestra and the Finnish fiddler group JPP playing duets with Timo Alakotila plus a piece by Alakotila for accordion, orchestra and JPP written for this occasion.

== Discography ==
- Planet Squeezebox, 1995 (Ellipsis Arts)
- Ahma, 2001 (Rockadillo Records)
- Bellow Poetry, 2006 (Alula Records)

=== Collaborations ===
- Åkerö, 2011, with Timo Alakotila (Åkerö ÅKERÖCD011)

=== Also appears on ===
- Beginner's Guide to Scandinavia, 2011 (Nascente/Demon Music Group)

== Honours ==
- 1997: 3 Years Composer Grant
- 1996: Prize of Finland
- 1983: Golden Accordion Competition
