= Germans in Finland =

Deutsche in Finnland Suomen saksalaiset
- (Germany) (Finland)

Total population
- 7,611 German-speakers (2022)

Regions with significant populations
- Helsinki, Espoo, Vantaa

Languages
- German · Finnish · Swedish

Religion
- Roman Catholicism · Atheism · Protestantism

Germans in Finland (German: Deutsche in Finnland; Finnish: Suomen saksalaiset; Swedish: tyskar i Finland)) are immigrants from Germany residing in Finland.

== History ==
During the Middle Ages, the most important officers and other nobles were Swedish or Germans. In Turku and Viipuri, 75% of the bourgeoisie were German.

Germans were also merchants. By 1924, there were 1,645 Germans in Finland.

The census of 1920 recorded 2,378 German speakers in Finland, of which 1,443 (60%) were living in the province of Uusimaa and 786 (33%) in Viipuri.

German families were essential for the development of Helsinki and the rest of Finland in the 19th century. German was the fourth most spoken language in Helsinki at the time after Swedish, Finnish and Russian. German schools that still operate today were established in Helsinki.

During World War II, there were about 200,000 German soldiers in Finland from 1941 to 1944, and an estimated 700 children were born to German soldiers and Finnish women.

Many present-day Finnish companies were started by Germans: Paulig by Gustav Paulig, Stockmann by Georg Franz Stockmann and Hackman by Johan Friedrich Hackman.

FC Germania Helsinki is a sports club formed by Germans in Finland in 2015 and officially established in 2017.

== Notable people ==
=== Born in the 18th century ===
- Samuel Berner, 1759, architect, originally from Germany
- Carl Ludvig Engel, 1778, architect, born German
- Johan Friedrich Hackman, 1755, merchant, originally from Germany
- Christian Friedrich Kress, 1767, military bandmaster, originally from Germany
- Christian Friedrich Schröder, 1595, city architect of Turku, originally from Germany
- Carl Gottfried Seuerling, 1727, actor and theatre director, originally from Germany

=== Born in the 19th century ===
- Eduard Ausfeld, 1885, German military officer in Finland during Finnish Civil War
- Willy Baer, 1875, visual artist, originally from Germany
- Wipert von Blücher, 1883, German ambassador to Finland 1935–44
- Richard Faltin, 1835, composer, conductor, organist, music educator, originally from Germany
- Alina Frasa, 1834, originally from Germany/Switzerland
- Ludovika Jakobsson, 1884, Olympic champion, originally from Germany
- Louis Kleineh, 1808, Finnish restaurateur, originally from Germany
- Ernst Lohrmann, 1803, architect, originally from Germany
- Albert Goldbeck-Löwe, 1863, businessman, originally from Germany
- Carl Gustaf Emil Mannerheim, 1867, former Finnish president, family originally from Germany in 17th century
- Fredrik Pacius, 1809, composer, born German
- Gustav Paulig, 1850, coffee roastery owner, originally from Germany
- Georg Franz Stockmann, 1825, merchant and founder of Stockmann retailer, originally from Germany
- Ferdinand Tilgmann, 1832, printing entrepreneur, originally from Germany
- Martin Wetzer, 1868, infantry general and jurist, father German

=== Born in the 20th century ===
- Lolo Krusius-Ahrenberg, 1909, political scientist, historian and professor of political science, originally from Germany
- Peter von Bagh, 1943, science author, German grandfather
- Gunvor Brettschneider, 1933, former rector of Svenska social- och kommunalhögskolan, father German
- Maria Guzenina, 1969, politician, of German descent
- Samu Haber, 1976, singer-songwriter, of German descent
- Eva Polttila, 1946, former news anchor, of German descent
- Lasse Pöysti, 1927, actor, German grandfather
- Michael Rießler, 1971, linguist, originally from Germany
- Roman Schatz, 1960, writer, born German

=== Born in the 21st century ===
- Niklas Linke, 2001, footballer, of Finnish descent with dual Finnish-German citizenship
- Julius Schmid, 2001, footballer, of Finnish descent with dual Finnish-German citizenship
- Lasse Schulz, 2003, footballer, of Finnish and German descent with dual Finnish-German citizenship
- Niklas Schulz, 2005, footballer, of Finnish and German descent with dual Finnish-German citizenship

== See also ==
- Finland–Germany relations
- German diaspora
- Immigration to Finland
