= Hokkanen =

Hokkanen is a Finnish surname. Notable people with the surname include:

- Erik Hokkanen (born 1963), American musician and composer
- Evert Hokkanen (1864–1918), Finnish politician
- Iivo Hokkanen (born 1985), Finnish ice hockey player

Many Hokkanens come from Kangasniemi, Finland. Some actually come from Hokka, Kangasniemi, Finland.
