= Mauno Järvelä =

Mauno Järvelä (born 25. November 1949) is a Finnish fiddler, violinist and music pedagogue. He is the uncle of Arto Järvelä, and both of them are members in the successful folk music group JPP, whose roots are the pelimanni tradition from Kaustinen. Mauno Järvelä also plays in Timo Alakotilas tango project Unto Tango Orchestra (Tango-orkesteri Unto) together with, among others, Maria Kalaniemi.

Mauno Järvelä was born in Kaustinen and learned fiddling from his father, Johannes Järvelä, himself the son of the well known wedding fiddler Antti Järvelä. Mauno was also trained as a classical violinist at the Sibelius Academy before they had a department for folk music, and he has worked as a violinist in symphony orchestra. In the 2000s (decade), he has so far (2005) been active mainly as music teacher, teaching adults and children in Kaustinen to play the violin using both folk music and classical training, and partly learning by ear. The children's project in Kaustinen is called Näppärit (roughly "the pluckers"). His teaching method is partly related to the Suzuki method and is widely nicknamed the sisuki method (after the Finnish concept sisu).

He also plays an important part in arranging folk music projects including young people from all the Nordic countries, based on the notion that traditional Nordic dance music from the different Nordic countries have much in common.
