= Torsten Tiebout =

Musician from Helsinki

Torsten Tiebout is a classical and jazz musician (viola and violin) from Helsinki.

Tiebout is alumnus of the Internationale Händel-Akademie in Karlsruhe, Germany. Currently (2020) he is a member of the Helsinki Philharmonic Orchestra and the chamber orchestra Avanti! in Helsinki. In addition to classical concerts, he has played together with the jazz musicians John Storgårds and Antti Sarpila and with the rock musician Pave Maijanen, among others.

In his spare time, he has played football for various clubs in the hobby league in Helsinki since 2012, including the German immigrant club FC Germania Helsinki.

== Discography (selected) ==
- Pehr Henrik Nordgren Violin Concerto No. 4 / Cronaca, 1996, Ondine
- Yari Ihanat naiset rannalla / Tuliportaat, 1998, Pyramid
- Pave Maijanen Mestarit Areenalla, 1999, Emi Finland/BMG Finland
- Antti Sarpila, Severi Pyysalo New moods, new sounds, 2001, Blue Note Records
- Erkki-Sven Tüür Oxymoron, 2007, ECM Records
- Johanna Grüssner, Patrick Wingren, Marcus Söderström & Wegeliuskvartetten I Sagans Värld, 2014, Wonderland
- Torsten Tiebout, Päivi Severeide, Erica Nygård Ensemble Transparent : Finnish Music for Flute, Viola and Harp, 2020, Pilfink Records
