= Järvelä =

Järvelä is a Finnish surname. Notable people with the surname include:

- Arto Järvelä (born 1964), Finnish composer and fiddler
- Jonne Järvelä (born 1974), Finnish guitarist and singer
- Maija Järvelä, Finnish biathlonist
- Mauno Järvelä (born 1949), Finnish musician
