= Mika Pohjola =

Finnish jazz pianist and composer

- Born: December 1, 1971 (age 54)
- Origin: Helsinki, Finland
- Genres: Jazz
- Instrument: Piano
- Website: mikapohjola.com

Mika Pohjola (born December 1, 1971) is a Finnish-born jazz pianist and composer who resides in Stockholm, Sweden. He is one of the most prolific Nordic jazz musicians in his generation. Pohjola has also lived and worked in the United States.

== Biography ==
=== Childhood in Helsinki, Finland (1971–1987) ===
Mika Pohjola was born in Helsinki, Finland, and grew up in the neighboring city of Vantaa. He received his formal education in a Steiner school, where his first instrument was violin. He then studied drums, and in 1979 piano and basic music theory with his father, Heikki Pohjola, who is a Finnish jazz guitarist. In 1981, young Pohjola entered the Helsinki cathedral boy choir, Cantores Minores under the direction of the German immigrant, Heinz Hofmann. The following year, Pohjola entered the Vantaa Conservatory in classical piano, music theory, counterpoint and composition. He also started playing jazz, and improvise freely. His early classical influences were Claude Debussy, Edvard Grieg and Johann Sebastian Bach, and some Finnish prominent composers, such as Aarre Merikanto. Pohjola was introduced to the music of Art Tatum, Charlie Parker and Oscar Peterson by his father, who played his large record collection at home. Pohjola performed music by Mozart, Beethoven and Debussy at regional recitals and received a shared second prize in the classical piano competition of Vantaa in 1987, and represented his city and the conservatory at the Ilmari Hannikainen Piano Competition.

=== Studies in Stockholm, Sweden (1987–1992) ===
In the Fall 1987, Pohjola moved to Stockholm, Sweden to study jazz and classical music at the Södra Latin Music Gymnasium. It was in Stockholm where he met his mentor and long-time friend, jazz pianist Alvaro Is Rojas, who taught him piano improvisation, jazz harmony and ear-training for five years, spanning his high school years and academic studies at the Royal Swedish College of Music. Pohjola received a master's degree in Jazz Improvisation and Education at age 20 in the Spring of 1992. His senior recital included his first recorded adult compositions, after which he was invited to join STIM, the collecting society for songwriters, composers and music publishers of Sweden. He also made his first radio appearance for the Swedish Radio in 1991.

=== Berklee and Boston (1992–1995) ===
After graduating from Stockholm, Pohjola moved to Boston, Massachusetts to study under a scholarship at Berklee College of Music. His continued studies were also supported by his Swedish college, where he had performed his studies with a Summa cum laude. His Berklee professors included Herb Pomeroy, Gary Burton, Phil Wilson, Ed Bedner, and Hal Crook. It was at Berklee where Pohjola met several of his performing and recording collaborators of the 1990s and 2000s, among them Jill Walsh, Johanna Grüssner, Fernando Huergo, Matt Penman, Bruno Råberg, Roberto Dani and Mick Goodrick. Pohjola graduated from Berklee with honors and several prizes in 1994. That same year he recorded Myths and Beliefs (GM Recordings), produced by Gunther Schuller.

=== Concert career (1995–2002) ===
Pohjola settled in New York City in 1995 and became a part of the thriving downtown jazz scene. He briefly studied with pianist Sal Mosca, who was a student of the legendary Lennie Tristano. Pohjola performed in the late 1990s at New York clubs Blue Note, Birdland, the Five Spot, Smalls, The Jazz Standard and Visiones. His collaborators included Chris Cheek, Mark Turner, Miguel Zenón, Ben Monder, Drew Gress, Jeff Williams, Jochen Rückert, Matt Wilson and Mark Ferber. Pohjola started touring Europe regularly, mostly as a bandleader and composer where he performed with his New York-based ensembles. Pohjola was invited to Ukraine in 1999, 2001 and 2002 as the cultural representative of the Finnish Foreign Ministry. As a counterbalance to his quartet, he formed a freely improvising duo, Sound of Village, with Yusuke Yamamoto. Their home became the Knitting Factory in New York City, but they also did two notable appearances at Steinway Hall. In 2000, Sound of Village recorded its self-titled album. Their tours included appearances at several jazz festivals in Scandinavia and Japan.

=== Arranging and recordings (2002–2006) ===
In the recording sessions of his first four albums as a leader, Pohjola's interest and knowledge in the possibilities of the recording studio grew from a mere documentary medium into a compositional tool. He had recorded two multi-tracked songs for his Landmark album in 2002, featuring multiple voices with fellow Finnish vocalist Johanna Grüssner. The success of Landmark led to further cooperation with Grüssner, and the first recording of the entire catalog of the original Moomin music songbook by Tove Jansson and Erna Tauro. Moomin Voices was released in two versions (2003 in Swedish; 2005 in Finnish). The follow-up album, A Lark in the Snowstorm (2006), featured Pohjola's original-minded arrangements of tangos.

=== Vocal-piano duos ===
Pohjola has ever since living in Sweden (in the late 1980s) been a specialist in collaborating with jazz vocalists. His earliest vocal partners included Rigmor Gustafsson and Lisa Werlinder, and in the Boston-period Johanna Grüssner, with whom he recorded an extended release Swedish Traditional Songs (2006). Pohjola has performed regularly with Nashville-based vocalist Jill Walsh since the late 1990s and released three albums.

=== Teaching ===
Since 1993, Pohjola has been a frequent clinician at conservatories, especially in Scandinavia. In the years 1995–2008, he was also the jazz principal and big band leader at the international Nilsiä Summer Music Camp. Since 2016, he has served as a professor at the Royal College of Music, Stockholm.

=== Recognitions ===
Pohjola is a Steinway Distinguished Artist since 1997, and a major visiting artist at Berklee College of Music since 2006.

=== Current career ===
Pohjola's latest releases, Northern Sunrise with Steve Wilson and Ben Monder, and solo piano album Great Tunes by My Friends with music by Kurt Rosenwinkel, Monder, Reid Anderson and others. Pohjola also plays Argentine chacarera and jazz compositions with bassist and composer Fernando Huergo. They recorded Provinciano for Sunnyside Records in 2008, on which Pohjola is also credited as the mixing and mastering engineer. Other albums with Pohjola credited as the mixing and mastering engineer include It's About Time by Terry Clarke, Jim Hall, Joe Lovano and Greg Osby and Duende by Alvaro Is Rojas.

== Discography ==
=== As leader ===
- Reflections in Real Time, 1994
- Myths and Beliefs, 1996
- Jazz Capital of the World, 1996
- The Secret of the Castle, 1997
- Announcement, 1998
- English Breakfast, 1999
- Live At The Blue Note, recorded 1996, released 2000
- Sound of Village, 2000
- Landmark, 2002
- Moomin Voices/Muminröster - in Swedish, 2003
- Ball Play, 2003
- Moomin Voices/Muumilauluja - in Finnish, 2005
- A Lark in the Snowstorm, 2006
- Northern Sunrise, 2009
- Christmas Carols, 2009
- Great Tunes by My Friends, 2009
- The Red Bicycle, 2009
- Trio Hour, 2013
- Chick Corea: Children's Songs, 2014

=== As sideman ===
- Orange, 1994 w. Sophie Dunér
- Johanna Grüssner Band, 1995 w. Johanna Grüssner
- Improvisations, 1997 w. George Garzone
- Taste of Honey 1998 w. Jill Walsh
- Still Alive, 2001 w. Miguel Zenón
- Live at Regattabar 2002 w. Fernando Huergo
- Grandes Éxitos del Tango, 2003 w. Tango Republic
- Swedish Traditional Songs, 2006 w. Johanna Grüssner
- Live at the Savoy 2006 w. Grupo Nuevo
- Suomalaisia Lauluja 2007 w. Eeppi Ursin
- Two for the Road, 2008 w. Jill Walsh
- Provinciano, 2008, w. Fernando Huergo
- Live on Broadway, 2009 w. Jill Walsh
- Zero, 2011 w. Maria Neckam
- Svenska psalmer - Swedish Hymns, 2013 w. Johanna Grüssner
- Nu ska vi sjunga, 2013 w. Johanna Grüssner

== See also ==
- List of jazz pianists
- List of American composers
- List of Finnish composers
