= Baechler =

Baechler is a surname. Notable people with the surname include:

- Alessia Baechler (born 2005), Swiss ice hockey player
- Donald Baechler (1956–2022), American painter and sculptor
- Germán Becker Baechler (1915–1994), Chilean politician
- Jean Baechler (1937–2022), French academic and sociologist

== See also ==
- Bachler, another surname
