= Accordion Tribe =

International accordion group

- Origin: Ghent, Belgium
- Years active: 1996–2010
- Members: Bratko Bibič; Lars Hollmer; Maria Kalaniemi; Guy Klucevsek; Otto Lechner

Accordion Tribe were an international accordion group featuring Bratko Bibič (Slovenia), Lars Hollmer (Sweden), Maria Kalaniemi (Finland), Guy Klucevsek (USA/Slovenia) and Otto Lechner (Austria). They have recorded three albums, have toured Europe several times and played in Victoriaville (QC) Canada in 1998.

In 2006 the third Accordion Tribe album, Lunghorn Twist, recorded in Uppsala at Lars Hollmer's Chickenhouse studios was picked in Songlines Magazine "Top of the World" chart.

== Biography ==
In Ghent, Belgium in May 1996, five internationally respected accordionists convened to form an ensemble that would explore the use of the instrument in different cultures and musical contexts. They rehearsed for three days and performed in Vooruit, following it with a three-week European tour. Their performances were recorded, and a self-titled album was culled from the results.

In 1998, Klucevsek put together Accordion Tribe II, with Alan Bern, Amy Denio, and Pauline Oliveros, again touring Europe and prompting a reunion of the original ensemble.

On December 25, 2008, member Lars Hollmer died after a brief illness. The group thus performed as a quartet during their already scheduled April 2009 tour, "in memory of their friend and colleague".

In 2010 Klucevsek announced that he had decided to let the group come to an end as an ongoing project but did not rule out the possibility of a reunion concert in the future.

== Discography ==
- Accordion Tribe (1997)
- Sea of Reeds (2002)
- Lunghorn Twist (2006)

== Film ==
Accordion Tribe - Music Travels is a German-language documentary film about the band, produced by Maximage of Switzerland and written and directed by Stefan Schwietert. It premiered in January 2004. In 2005 it won the Swiss Film Prize for the Best Documentary, as well as the documentary film prize at the Würzburg International Filmweekend. The film features the life of the band on the road and in concert, as well as exploring each individual member in their homelands.
