= Bratko Bibič =

Slovenian accordionist

Bratko Bibič (born 1957) is a Slovenian accordionist.

Bibič first came to prominence as a rock musician, playing in the ensembles Begnagrad and Nimal in the 1980s; both groups blended Slavic folk music with art rock. Begnagrad toured Yugoslavia and Switzerland in the early 1980s, releasing a single LP in 1982 before disbanding; Bibič went on to do work in film scores before the creation of Nimal in 1987. Nimal released two albums in the late 1980s before their 1991 breakup.

Returning to work in film and dance scoring, Bibič lived through the breakup of Yugoslavia, when it became difficult to live prominently as a musician. In 1995, he released his debut solo record, Bratko Bibič and the Madleys of Bridko Bebič, on LabelUsineS. The following year, Bibič joined the Accordion Tribe, an international touring group of accordionists. Bibič continues to perform as a solo artist and as a duettist, with Otto Lechner, Matjaž Sekne, and Waedi Gysi.
