= Niklas Schulz =

Finnish footballer (born 2005)

Personal information
- Full name: Karl Niklas Schulz
- Date of birth: 10 October 2005 (age 21)
- Place of birth: Finland
- Position: Goalkeeper

Team information
- Current team: AC Oulu
- Number: 99

Youth career
- –2015: KäPa
- 2016–2019: HJK
- 2020–2021: KäPa
- 2022: PK Keski-Uusimaa

Senior career*
| Years | Team | Apps | (Gls) |
| 2023 | JäPS | 1 | (0) |
| 2023–2024 | Gravina | 15 | (0) |
| 2025– | AC Oulu | 4 | (0) |
| 2025– | → OLS (loan) | 15 | (0) |

International career
| 2023 | Finland U18 | 1 | (0) |
- * Club domestic league appearances and goals as of 24 July 2026

Karl Niklas Schulz (born 10 October 2005) is a Finnish professional footballer who plays as a goalkeeper for AC Oulu in Veikkausliiga.

== Career ==
Schulz has played in the youth sectors of Käpylän Pallo, HJK Helsinki and PKKU, before making his senior debut with Järvenpään Palloseura (JäPS) in the second-tier Ykkönen in 2023. For the 2023–24 season, Schulz joined Italian Serie D club Gravina.

On 6 November 2024, Schulz signed with Veikkausliiga club AC Oulu for the 2025 season, with an option for 2026.

== Personal life ==
His older brother Lasse Schulz is also a football goalkeeper, playing for Vendsyssel FF. They hold a dual citizenship of Finland and Germany.

== Career statistics ==
As of 2 May 2025

Appearances and goals by club, season and competition
| Club | Season | League | | | Cup (Note: Includes Suomen Cup) | | League cup (Note: Includes Finnish League Cup) | | Europe | | Total | |
| Club | Season | Division | Apps | Goals | Apps | Goals | Apps | Goals | Apps | Goals | Apps | Goals |
|---|---|---|---|---|---|---|---|---|---|---|---|---|
| PK Keski-Uusimaa II | 2022 | Kolmonen | 3 | 0 | – | | – | | – | | 3 | 0 |
| JäPS | 2023 | Ykkönen | 1 | 0 | 0 | 0 | 0 | 0 | – | | 1 | 0 |
| JäPS II | 2023 | Kolmonen | 6 | 0 | – | | – | | – | | 6 | 0 |
| Gravina | 2023–24 | Serie D | 15 | 0 | – | | 0 | 0 | – | | 15 | 0 |
| AC Oulu | 2025 | Veikkausliiga | 2 | 0 | 1 | 0 | 1 | 0 | – | | 4 | 0 |
| OLS (loan) | 2025 | Ykkönen | 1 | 0 | – | | – | | – | | 1 | 0 |
| Career total | | | 28 | 0 | 1 | 0 | 1 | 0 | 0 | 0 | 30 | 0 |
