= Johanna Grüssner =

- Born: Åland
- Occupations: Singer, teacher, arranger
- Instrument: Voice
- Years active: 1998-present
- Member of: Ulvens Döttrar
- Website: en.johannagrussner.com

Johanna Grüssner (born 1972) is an Åland jazz singer, teacher and musician. Her journey to take a choir of schoolchildren from the Bronx to sing in her home of Åland became the subject of a book entitled Seven Days of Possibilities. She formed the Nordic Music Council Prize- nominated trio, Ulvens Döttrar, with her sisters; in 2019 she was also nominated for the award as a solo artist.

== Career ==
Grüssner studied at Berklee College of Music in Boston, graduating in 1996. In 1998 she earned a master's degree in jazz singing at the Manhattan School of Music. In the USA, she lived, studied and worked as a teacher in Public School 86 in the Bronx, for a total of eight years. The 24-strong choir of eleven year-olds she coached while working in the Bronx travelled to Åland. The trip became the subject of a book entitled Seven Days of Possibilities Anemona Hartocollis. In 2001 she returned to Scandinavia to live in Stockholm.

In 2003 she was the vocalist for a record of original songs that feature in the Moomin books; these were composed and arranged by Mika Pohjola. They also collaborated on a recording of the folk tune Fjäriln vingad syns på Haga, in a medley with "Glimmande nymf" on their song album Nu blir sommar in 2006. With her two sisters, Ella and Isabella, Grüssner formed the trio Ulvens Döttrar. Most of the trio's work is composed by Ella, with lyrics by Isabella, whilst Grüssner works on arrangements.

In 2019 she was nominated for the Nordic Music Council Prize due to her "broad musicality and her production and conducting skills, as well as her ability to involve amateurs and professionals alike in her performances". Previously, in 2009, Ulvens Döttrar had been also nominated for the award.

== Personal life ==
Grüssner is married with two children. She has muscular dystrophy. Her grandmother and her family were sent to Lempäälä as prisoners of war.

== Selected discography ==
- Johanna Grüssner Band - 1995, Blue Music Group
- Live at Hubbard Hall - 1998, Blue Music Group
- Moomin Voices (vocalist) - 2003, Blue Music Group
- No More Blues - 2004, Prophone/Naxos Sweden
- Lazy Afternoon - 2006, Prophone/Naxos Sweden
- Nu blir sommar - 2006, Blue Music Group
- I Sagans Värld - 2008, Blue Music Group
- Come Rain or Come Shine - 2010, Prophone/Naxos Sweden
- Svenska psalmer - 2012, Blue Music Group
- Nu ska vi sjunga - 2013, Blue Music Group
- Sång över vita skogar - 2014, Blue Music Group
- Puttes äventyr i Blåbärsskogen - 2016, Blue Music Group
- Favorite Christmas Carols - 2016, Blue Music Group
- Visor öär skär - 2019, Blue Music Group
