= FC Germania Helsinki =

Finnish sports club

Germania
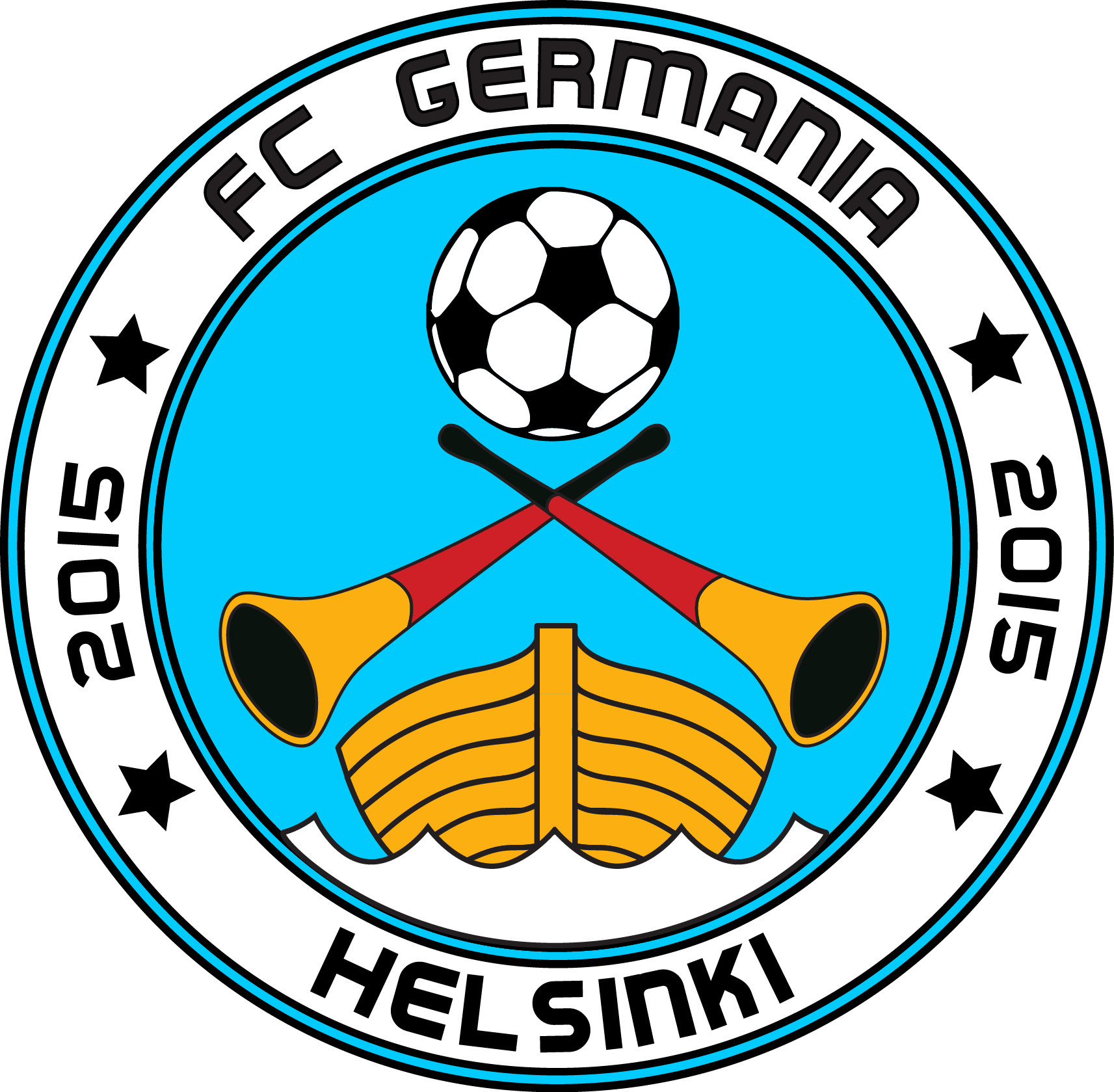
- Full name: FC Germania Helsinki
- Founded: 17.11.2017
- Chairman: (Germany) Tim Becker
- League: Vitonen
- 2022: 1

FC Germania Helsinki (FCGH) is a sports club from Greater Helsinki, Finland, playing association football.

== History ==
The club was formed by German-speaking immigrants in 2015 and formally established in 2017. It has been a Registered association and member of the Football Association of Finland since 2018. FC Germania is listed among the official German institutions in Finland. The sports club has about 60 members, among them many immigrants from the German speaking area and Finns with family ties to Germany, Austria or Switzerland.

Germania's first men's team plays in Vitonen. The second men's team, called FC Germania/Akademie, plays in Kutonen and there is another men's team, called FC Germania Hki 2015, playing in Helsinki's hobby league. A youth section was established in 2021 with a mixed team at preschool age training at the German School Helsinki. During the winter saison 2018–19 even a women's team, called FCGH Ladies, was playing.

The Club Chairman is the lawyer Tim Becker, who was born in the former GDR and has been living in Vantaa since 2007. The German professional player Thomas Dähne, who won both the Finnish League and Finnish League Cup in 2017, has been an honorary member since the club's foundation.

== Season to season ==
Season	Level	Division	Section	Administration	Position	Movements
2019	Tier 7	Kutonen (Sixth Division)	5	SPL Helsinki and Uusimaa	2nd	Promoted
2020	Tier 6	Vitonen (Fifth Division)	5	SPL Helsinki and Uusimaa	4th	
2021	Tier 6	Vitonen (Fifth Division)	5	SPL Helsinki and Uusimaa	5th	
2022	Tier 6	Vitonen (Fifth Division)	5	SPL Helsinki and Uusimaa	1st	Promoted

- 3 seasons in Vitonen
- 1 season in Kutonen

== Notable club members ==
- Benjamin Bachler, former Austrian professional player
- Thomas Dähne, German professional player
- Mia Heikkinen, musician
- Ewald Kibler, former Austrian professional player
- Torsten Tiebout, musician

== See also ==
- Football Association of Finland
- Germans in Finland

== Links and References ==
- Official Website
- Club profile, Suomen Palloliitto
- Interwiew with two executive committee members, Finntastic.de
- Interwiew with two players from 1st squad, Fussballbotschafter.de
