= Lasse Schulz =

Finnish footballer (born 2003)

Personal information
- Full name: Lasse William Schulz
- Date of birth: 29 March 2003 (age 23)
- Place of birth: Helsinki, Finland
- Height: 1.98 m (6 ft 6 in)
- Position: Goalkeeper

Team information
- Current team: Vendsyssel
- Number: 1

Youth career
- –2013: HyPS
- 2013–2015: KäPa
- 2016–2018: HJK
- 2019: Honka
- 2020: Greuther Fürth

Senior career*
Years	Team	Apps	(Gls)
2020–2024	Greuther Fürth	0	(0)
2020–2024	Greuther Fürth II	40	(0)
2023–2024	→ Viborg (loan)	0	(0)
2024–	Vendsyssel	62	(1)

International career^{‡}
2023	Finland U21	4	(0)
- * Club domestic league appearances and goals as of 18 June 2026 ‡ National team caps and goals as of 16 November 2023

Lasse Schulz (born 29 March 2003) is a Finnish professional footballer who plays as a goalkeeper for Danish club Vendsyssel FF and the Finland under-21 national team.

== Club career ==
Schulz started football in Finland, playing in the youth sectors of Hyvinkään Palloseura, Käpylän Pallo, HJK Helsinki and Honka.

On 1 January 2020, at the age of 16, Schulz moved to Germany and joined Greuther Fürth organisation and was initially registered to their U17-squad. Later in October he made his senior debut with the club's reserve team in Regionalliga.

On 21 August 2023, Danish Superliga club Viborg FF acquired Schulz on a loan deal for the 2023–24 season. He played mainly for the U19 side during his stint.

On 31 May 2024, Schulz signed a permanent three-year contract with Vendsyssel FF in Danish 1st Division. On 4 October, Schulz scored a goal for Vendsyssel, an equalizer in stoppage time in a 2–2 draw against Hillerød.

== International career ==
Schulz was named in the squad for the Finland U15 training camp in 2017. Schulz made his debut in international stage in 2023 with Finland U21 national team.

== Personal life ==
Born in Finland, Schulz is also of German descent and holds dual Finnish-German citizenship. His brother Niklas Schulz is also a professional goalkeeper.

== Career statistics ==
As of 7 October 2025

Appearances and goals by club, season and competition
Club	Season	League			National cup		Continental		Other		Total	
Club	Season	Division	Apps	Goals	Apps	Goals	Apps	Goals	Apps	Goals	Apps	Goals
Greuther Fürth	2020–21	2. Bundesliga	0	0	0	0	—		—		0	0
Greuther Fürth	2022–23	2. Bundesliga	0	0	0	0	—		—		0	0
Greuther Fürth II	2020–21	Regionalliga Bayern	3	0	0	0	—		—		3	0
Greuther Fürth II	2021–22	Regionalliga Bayern	12	0	—		—		—		12	0
Greuther Fürth II	2022–23	Regionalliga Bayern	25	0	—		—		—		25	0
Greuther Fürth II	Total		40	0	0	0	0	0	0	0	40	0
Viborg FF (loan)	2023–24	Danish Superliga	0	0	0	0	—		—		0	0
Vendsyssel FF	2024–25	Danish 1st Division	30	1	0	0	—		—		30	1
Vendsyssel FF	2025–26	Danish 2nd Division	10	0	1	0	—		—		11	0
Vendsyssel FF	Total		40	0	1	0	0	0	0	0	41	0
Career total			80	1	1	0	0	0	0	0	81	1
