= Niklas Linke =

Finnish footballer (born 2001)

Personal information
- Full name: Niklas Julian Linke
- Date of birth: 28 December 2001 (age 24)
- Place of birth: Düsseldorf, Germany
- Height: 1.95 m (6 ft 5 in)
- Position: Goalkeeper

Team information
- Current team: FSV Frankfurt
- Number: 1

Youth career
- –2018: BV 04 Dortmund
- 2018–2019: 1. FC Mönchengladbach

Senior career*
Years	Team	Apps	(Gls)
2020	1. FC Mönchengladbach	8	(0)
2020–2021	SC Union Nettetal	0	(0)
2021–2022	VfB Homberg	1	(0)
2022–2023	SV Horn	2	(0)
2023–2024	Eintracht Trier	26	(0)
2024–	FSV Frankfurt	0	(0)

International career^{‡}
- Finland U19
- * Club domestic league appearances and goals as of 22 July 2024 ‡ National team caps and goals as of 12 May 2024

Niklas Julian Linke (born 28 December 2001) is a Finnish professional footballer who plays as a goalkeeper for German club FSV Frankfurt in Regionalliga Südwest.

== Club career ==
In July 2023, Linke signed with newly relegated club Eintracht Trier in Oberliga Rheinland-Pfalz/Saar.

== Personal life ==
Born and raised in Germany, Linke is of Finnish descent and holds a dual Finnish-German citizenship.
