= JPP =

Finnish folk music group

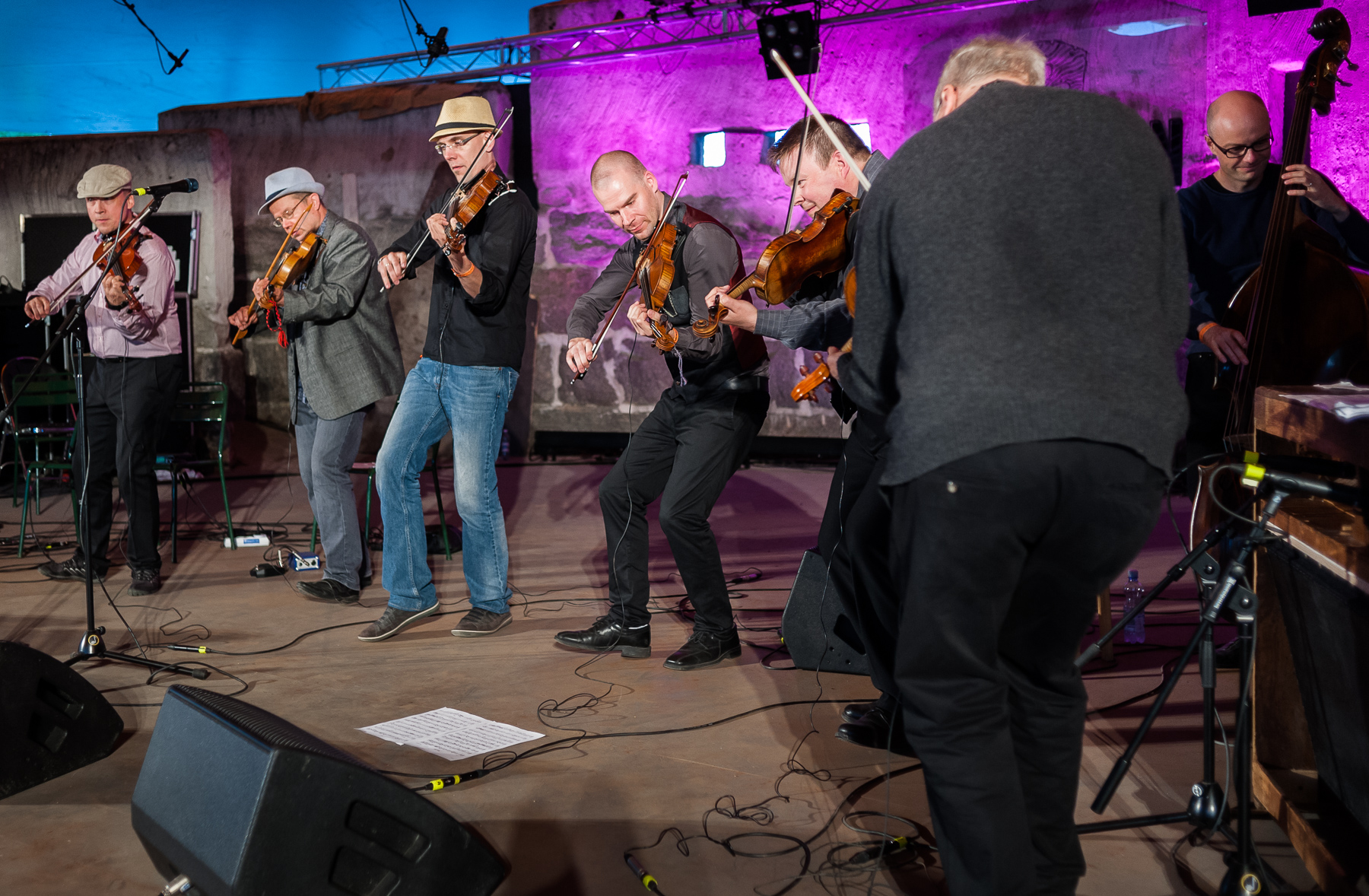
JPP at the Kaustinen Folk Music Festival in 2015

J.P.P. is a Finnish fiddle group. It still uses the Kaustinen traditional settings with fiddles, harmonium and double bass, although their arrangements are more advanced than those of earlier generations of traditional musicians in the area. The group's repertoire consists of traditional tunes, as well as newly-composed music in old-style dance rhythms -- polskas, waltzes, schottisches, etc. -- as well as some Finnish-style tangos, and some jazz and bluegrass influences too.

Järvelän Pikkupelimannit began in the early 1980s as an offshoot of the group Järvelän Pelimannit, which consisted mainly of older musicians (in Finnish pelimanni) from the village of Järvelä. The group's original full name, literally "Little Fiddlers of Järvelä," was abbreviated "JPP," which then became the group's official name. JPP further developed local musical tradition with their innovative arrangements and, inspired by other folk music groups, played not only local tunes but also those from other parts of the country. Group members Arto Järvelä and Timo Alakotila have been mainly responsible for the group's original compositions and arrangements.

Most of the members have studied at the Sibelius-Akatemia University, mainly at the folk music department. For many years the band consisted of brothers Jouni and Arto Järvelä, who are fourth-generation folk musicians from Järvelä, their uncle Mauno Järvelä and Jarmo and Juha Varila on fiddles, Timo Alakotila on harmonium, and Janne Virkkala on double bass. Jouni Järvelä and the Varila brothers were later succeeded by Matti Mäkelä and Tommi Pyykönen, first on tours and then also on recordings. Antti Järvelä followed Timo Myllykangas on bass.

While JPP releases fewer recordings today than in its early years, the group still tours in both Europe and North America, mainly performing at folk music/world music festivals. Group members have several additional projects, especially Arto Järvelä and Tima Alakotila who are involved in many other groups, both pure folk music and fusions with other styles. Mauno Järvelä, who used to play in symphony orchestra, is currently very active as a teacher of violin and pelimanni music. His method of teaching children to play violin, related to the Suzuki method, is nicknamed the sisuki method.

== Records ==
- Järvelän Pikkupelimannit, 1983 (EP)
- Laitisen Mankeliska, 1986
- JPP, 1988 (double LP)
- I've Found a New Tango, 1990
- Pirun Polska/Devil's polska, 1992
- Kaustinen Rhapsody, 1994
- String Tease, 1998
- History, 1999 (compilation)
- Huutokatrilli!, 2001 (mini-CD with dance music)
- Artology, 2006
