= Erik Hokkanen =

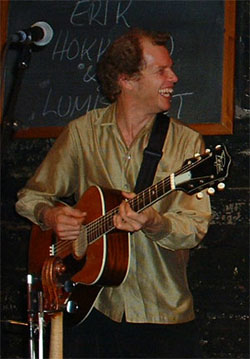

Background information
- Born: February 23, 1963 (age 63); Clearwater, Florida, U.S.
- Genres: Gypsy; western swing; surf rock; rock; rockabilly; bluegrass; classical
- Occupations: Musician, composer
- Instruments: Fiddle, guitar
- Years active: 1987–present

Erik Hokkanen (born February 23, 1963) is an American fiddler, guitar player, and composer living in Austin, Texas. Erik is known for performing and composing an array of musical styles, including gypsy music, western swing, surf rock, rock music, rockabilly, bluegrass music, and classical. He moves effortlessly among instruments, often playing violin while an electric guitar hangs down his back. A third generation Finn raised in Florida, Erik has toured extensively throughout Scandinavia, playing major festivals and clubs with top Finnish musicians.

== Biography ==
Born into a musical family, Erik began his musical training at age four on piano. Over the following years, he learned mandolin, guitar, and string bass. At age twelve, Erik began studying old-time music, jazz, and classical music on the violin. At age eighteen, Erik won first place at the Florida State Fiddle Contest.

In 1984, at age 21, Erik moved to Austin, TX and joined Gary P. Nunn's band and toured throughout the Southwest. By 1986, Erik had formed his own group called "Erik & the Offbeats" and recorded his first album. Another big breakthrough came in 1987 when Erik toured Finland for the first time and performed at the Kaustinen Folk Festival. After this initial success, Erik returned to Kaustinen in 1988 and toured extensively, often performing at blues and rock festivals with famed Finnish rocker Dave Lindholm. In 1989, Erik returned to Finland with his brother Niles, an accomplished mandolinist, where they performed and lead workshops in both Kaustinen and Haapavesi. In 1994, Erik returned to Finland to form the all-star group "Lumisudet" with Arto Järvelä, Petri Hakala, and Tapani Varis. They recorded "Kaustinen, TX," the first of their three albums. Guest stars included Mauno Järvelä, Napparit, Janne Viksten, Janne Haavisto, Dave Lindholm, Kimmo Pohjonen, and Timo Alakotila. Journalist Pirkko Kotirinta, of the Helsinki Sanomat, declared the recording 1995's "Album of the Year." The Kaustinen Folk Festival Institute released Erik's song "Kaustinen, TX" as a single, which receive much radio airplay throughout Finland. Erik returned in 1996 for a follow-up tour with Lumisudet and performed on television and radio, as well as the festival circuit.

Meanwhile, back in Texas, Erik's star continued to rise, being voted a three-time winner of the Kerrville Folk Festival Music Awards' "Instrumentalist of the year" (1993-1995) and was inducted into the Kerville Festival's Music Hall of Fame in 1996. This year also saw John Travolta dancing to Erik's fiddle music ("Erik's Two Step") in the movie "Michael."

In 1998, Erik became a Professor of Music in the Folk Music Department of the prestigious Sibelius Academy in Helsinki, Finland. During his tenure, he recorded his second album with Lumisudet, "In the Heart of the Waking Dream," and also gave concerts with the group. In the classroom, he taught violin, guitar, music theory, and American music styles. On an interesting side note, Erik discovered his second cousin Hannu Tolvanen was also working at the Sibelius Academy, just three doors down from Erik's office! Erik enjoyed greeting him with a "Hi, cuz! Hyvää Päivää!" They are still friends today.

Erik's next Scandinavian wave began in 2003 when he reunited with Lumisudet, touring in Sweden, Norway, Denmark, as well as Finland. They continued touring each spring from 2003-2007, culminating in the recording of their third album, "Cosmic Meltdown," which was recorded in Järvenpää, just down the road from Sibelius' historic Ainola home. Erik's guest stars on this album included Maria Kalaniemi, J. Karjalainen, as well as regulars from previous recordings.

Since the 1990s, Erik has been a regular member of Native American singer Joanne Shenandoah's band, touring the United States and even playing Carnegie Hall in 2006.

In 2009, Erik was inducted into the Texas Western Swing Hall of Fame. It has been said that pound for pound, Erik is the most talented musician in Austin.

In 2012, Erik toured Scandinavia with Lumisudet, celebrating his 25th anniversary since his first visit to Finland.

In Texas, Erik performs concerts and teaches music. In January 2012, he was the guest musician on Larry Monroe's Texas Radio Live show broadcast on KDRP from Guero's Taco Bar on South Congress Street.

He resides in the Texas Hill Country outside of Austin where he enjoys sauna, Native American sweat lodges, and practicing primitive survival skills in his spare time. He's the father of his son Luke and stepson Andrew, both now adults.

Bands he has founded include:

- Erik and the Offbeats
- Erik and the She-Wolves
- Erik and the Hip Replacements (with guitarist/singer Will Webster and upright bass player Tyler Lambourne)
- Erik and Erik (with singer/songwriter Erik Moll)
- Lumisudet
- Flat Top Jones

Bands he has been a member of or participated with include:

- Gary P. Nunn
- Joanne Shenandoah
- Mad Cat Trio (featuring Danny Barnes and Mark Rubin of the Bad Livers)
- Bad Livers (studio fiddler)
- Junior Brown
- JPP
- Wayne Hancock

== Discography ==
- Erik and the Offbeats (1987)
- Blue Corn (1989)
- Erik & Erik (1992)
- Earth Swing (1994)
- Erik Hokkanen & Lumisudet: Kaustinen, Texas (1995)
- Swing the Night Away (1996)
- Barnes, Hokkanen and Rubin: Mad Cat Trio (1998)
- Erik Hokkanen & Lumisudet: In the Heart of the Waking Dream (1999)
- Scout Fiddle Blues: Souvenir Album (2000)
- Erik and the She Wolves (2002)
- Erik and the Hip Replacements, Gypsy Twan (2002)
- Erik and the She-Wolves, Melodrama Sweetheart (2005)
- Erik and the Hip Replacements, Alive in Austin (2005)
- Erik Hokkanen & Lumisudet: Cosmic Meltdown Vol. 1 (2008)
- Erik Hokkanen and the Hip Replacements: Cornucopia (2011)
- Erik Hokkanen & Lumisudet: Cool things (2015)

== Soundtracks ==
- DOA (1988)
- The Return of Texas Chain Saw Massacre (1994)
- Michael (1996)
- The Newton Boys (1998)
