= Anemona Hartocollis =

American journalist

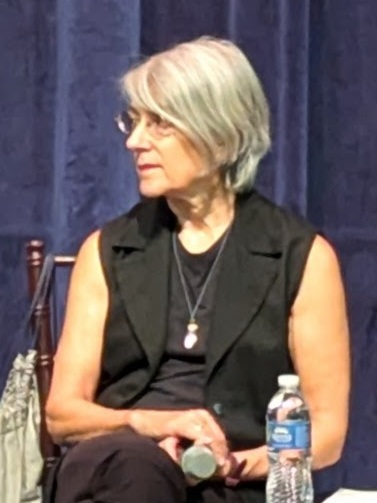
Hartocollis in 2024

Anemona Maria Hartocollis (November 3, 1955) is a Swiss-born American journalist for The New York Times.

== Biography ==
Hartocollis was born in Lausanne, Switzerland, and raised in the Potwin neighborhood of Topeka, Kansas. Her father was Peter Hartocollis, a Greek psychoanalyst and former director of Topeka's C.F. Menninger Memorial Hospital. Hartocollis graduated in 1977 from Harvard University with a bachelor's degree in comparative literature where she was a reporter at The Harvard Crimson. She has twice won the Front Page Award from Newswomen's Club of New York.

She began covering education for the Times in 1997.

She wrote the book Seven Days of Possibilities: One Teacher, 24 Kids, and the Music That Changed Their Lives Forever, published in 2004, based on a series of articles published in the Times.

Hartocollis was married to fellow Times writer Josh Barbanel until his death from cancer in July 2021.
