= Lee Aaron Bachler =

American politician (1925–1979)

Member of the Missouri Senate from the 28th district
- Incumbent
- Assumed office 1958

Personal details
- Born: 1925 Anderson, Missouri
- Died: 1979 (aged 53–54)
- Party: Democratic
- Spouse: Jean Parker
- Children: 3 sons, Clay, David, Noel
- Education: Joplin Junior College; Lincoln University; University of Missouri
- Occupation: Politician, steel worker, farmer, mail carrier

Lee Aaron Bachler (1925–1979) was an American politician from Anderson, Missouri, who served in the Missouri Senate and the Missouri House of Representatives. He was educated at Pineville High School. Bachler served two years in the Merchant Marines during World War II and in the U.S. Army from 1953 until 1954 during the Korean War.
