= Arto Järvelä =

Finnish fiddler and composer (born 1964)

Arto Järvelä (born in 1964 in Hattula, Finland) is a Finnish fiddler and composer. Because of the many groups and projects he is involved in, he has been called "the busiest man in Finnish folk music". He is primarily a violinist, but among other instruments of his are nyckelharpa, mandolin and kantele. Arto Järvelä is the fourth generation of the well known Järvelä fiddler family, whose musical roots belong in the rural area close to the small town Kaustinen.

As a ten-year-old, he started to play the drums and bass guitar in a family band, together with his father. He got serious on the fiddle at about 13 years of age. He played the harmonium (pump organ) in a band of youngsters called Järvelän pikkupelimannit (the small fiddlers from the Järvelä village) until he got good enough on the fiddle to join the group as a fiddler. This group eventually became the most well known Finnish fiddler folk music group, abbreviating its name into JPP. Besides having learned to play the traditional route, Järvelä is also trained in the Sibelius Academy's department for folk music, where he nowadays also teaches.

Among the groups where he is or has been a member are:

- JPP
- The trio Alakotila-Järvelä-Kennemark, along with Timo Alakotila from JPP and the Swedish fiddler Hans Kennemark
- Koinurit, a group playing polskas as fast as possible sometimes called Finland's answer to the Pogues
- Pinnin Pojat, Arto and Kimmo Pohjonen. The original setting, later expanded, was Kimmo on mouth harp and Arto on fiddle/nyckelharpa/mandolin
- Helsinki Mandoliners, a mandolin trio
- Lumisudet, the Finnish-Texan fiddler Erik Hokkanen's band
- Aldargaz, accordionist Maria Kalaniemis group
- Niekku, one of Maria Kalaniemi's earlier bands form while students at the Sibelius Academy
- Salamakannel, kantele with rock influences
- Ampron Prunni, harmonium och nyckelharpa
- Tallari

== Solo discography ==
Only solo records mentioned here. Titles of JPP records can be found under the groups' entry.

- Polska Differente, 1994
- Arto Järvelä plays fiddle, 1999
- Far in!, 2004
- Arto Järvelä plays fiddle Vol.2: Cross-tuned 2012
- Arto Järvelä plays fiddle Vol.3: On the coast 2013
