= Lolo Krusius-Ahrenberg =

Finnish historiann and political scientist

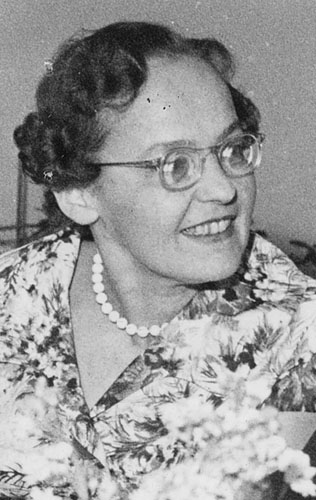
- Krusius-Ahrenberg in the 1950s
- Born: June 21, 1909; Marburg, Germany
- Died: July 13, 2003 (aged 94); Helsinki, Finland

Helena Charlotte Johanna (Lolo) Krusius-Ahrenberg, née Krusius (21 June 1909 – 13 July 2003), was a Finnish historian and political scientist. She was professor of history and political science at the Hanken School of Economics in Helsinki from 1948 to 1972, and the first female professor in her field in Finland and the Nordic countries. She was the sister of the physician Franz-Eduard Krusius.

== Life and career ==
Krusius-Ahrenberg was born in Marburg, Germany, to Franz Florian Krusius and Constance Emilie von Bomhard. She began her schooling in Berlin before her family moved to Vaasa, Finland, where her father had taken up a position as an ophthalmologist. After completing her matriculation examination at the Vaasa Swedish co-educational school in 1926, she studied at the University of Helsinki and at Goethe University Frankfurt, where she earned her master's and licentiate degrees in 1932. In 1934 she was awarded a PhD for a dissertation on the breakthrough of nationalism and liberalism in Finland in the mid-19th century, a work that was long used as a course book in the Nordic countries and in Germany.

She held a docentship in Finnish and Scandinavian history at the University of Helsinki from 1945 to 1954, and served as senior lecturer in political science at the Swedish Civic College (Svenska medborgarhögskolan) in Helsinki from 1945 to 1960. From 1948 to 1972 she was professor of history and political science at the Hanken School of Economics, where she also held a docentship from 1973 to 1976.

== Research ==
Krusius-Ahrenberg's research spanned the history of Finnish political development and comparative political science. Her early work addressed the rise of nationalism and liberalism and the role of the Estate Diet in 19th-century Finnish history. Her book Tyrannmördaren C.F. Ehrensvärd (The Tyrannicide C.F. Ehrensvärd, 1947) examined the aristocratic radicalism and ideological circumstances surrounding the conspiracy and assassination of Gustav III of Sweden; the work is regarded as a classic in its field.

From the 1950s onwards her research focus shifted increasingly towards political science, in particular the political activities of interest organizations and comparative constitutional development in Europe and the United States. She contributed the main part of volume II of Suomen kansanedustuslaitoksen historia (A History of the Finnish Parliament, 1981), a major state-commissioned work documenting Finnish parliamentary history from the mid-1850s to the late 1870s. For this contribution she was awarded an honorary doctorate by the University of Helsinki.

At the Hanken School of Economics she initiated the renaming of her chair to economic politology, aligning the discipline with the approach of institutions such as the London School of Economics.

== International role ==
Krusius-Ahrenberg played a significant role as an international bridge-builder in political science. During her time at Goethe University Frankfurt she had been responsible for the Akademische Austauschstelle, an academic exchange office, which later contributed to the establishment of DAAD scholarship exchanges between Germany and Finland.

She was instrumental in bringing Finland into the International Political Science Association (IPSA), and in 1957 became the first Finnish participant in an IPSA conference on the political activities of interest organizations. As one of the first Finnish members of the American Political Science Association (APSA), she reconnected with former German colleagues and teachers who had emigrated to the United States, including Hans Morgenthau, Carl J. Friedrich, Karl Mannheim, and Herbert Marcuse, all of whom had shaped the development of American political science.

== Honours ==
Krusius-Ahrenberg was elected a member of the Finnish Society of Sciences and Letters in 1950. {Wikidata awards}
