= Benjamin Bachler =

Austrian footballer (born 1994)

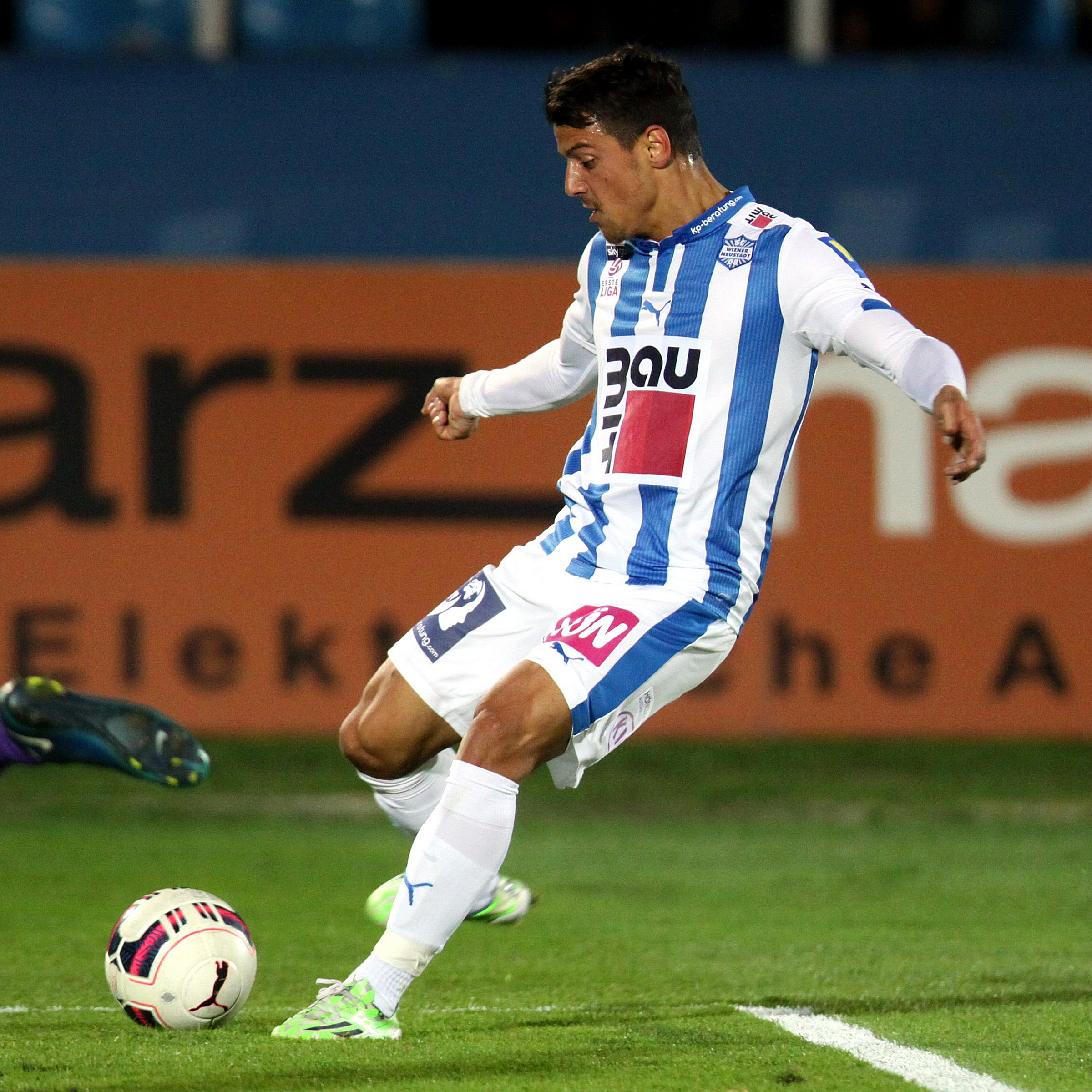

Personal information
- Date of birth: 22 April 1994 (age 32)
- Place of birth: Linz, Austria
- Height: 1.73 m (5 ft 8 in)
- Position: Midfielder

Team information
- Current team: SC Bad Sauerbrunn

Youth career
- SC St.Valentin
- LAZ Steyr
- 2012: LASK Linz

Senior career*
| Years | Team | Apps | (Gls) |
| 2012–2014 | LASK Linz | 9 | (0) |
| 2014–2015 | Pasching/LASK Juniors | 29 | (2) |
| 2015–2016 | Wiener Neustadt | 15 | (0) |
| 2016–2017 | FCM Traiskirchen | 22 | (0) |
| 2017–2018 | SV Loipersbach | | |
| 2018– | SC Bad Sauerbrunn | | |
- * Club domestic league appearances and goals as of 00:16, 11 March 2020 (UTC)

Benjamin Bachler (born 22 April 1994) is an Austrian footballer who currently plays for SC Bad Sauerbrunn.

He has previously played for LASK Linz, SPG FC Pasching/LASK Linz Juniors and SC Wiener Neustadt.

== Career ==
In July 2018, Bachler joined SC Bad Sauerbrunn. Currently (summer 2022) in Finnish Vitonen for FC Germania Helsinki.

== Honours ==
=== Club ===
LASK Linz

- Austrian Regional League Central (2): 2012–13, 2013–14
