= Otto Lechner =

Austrian accordionist

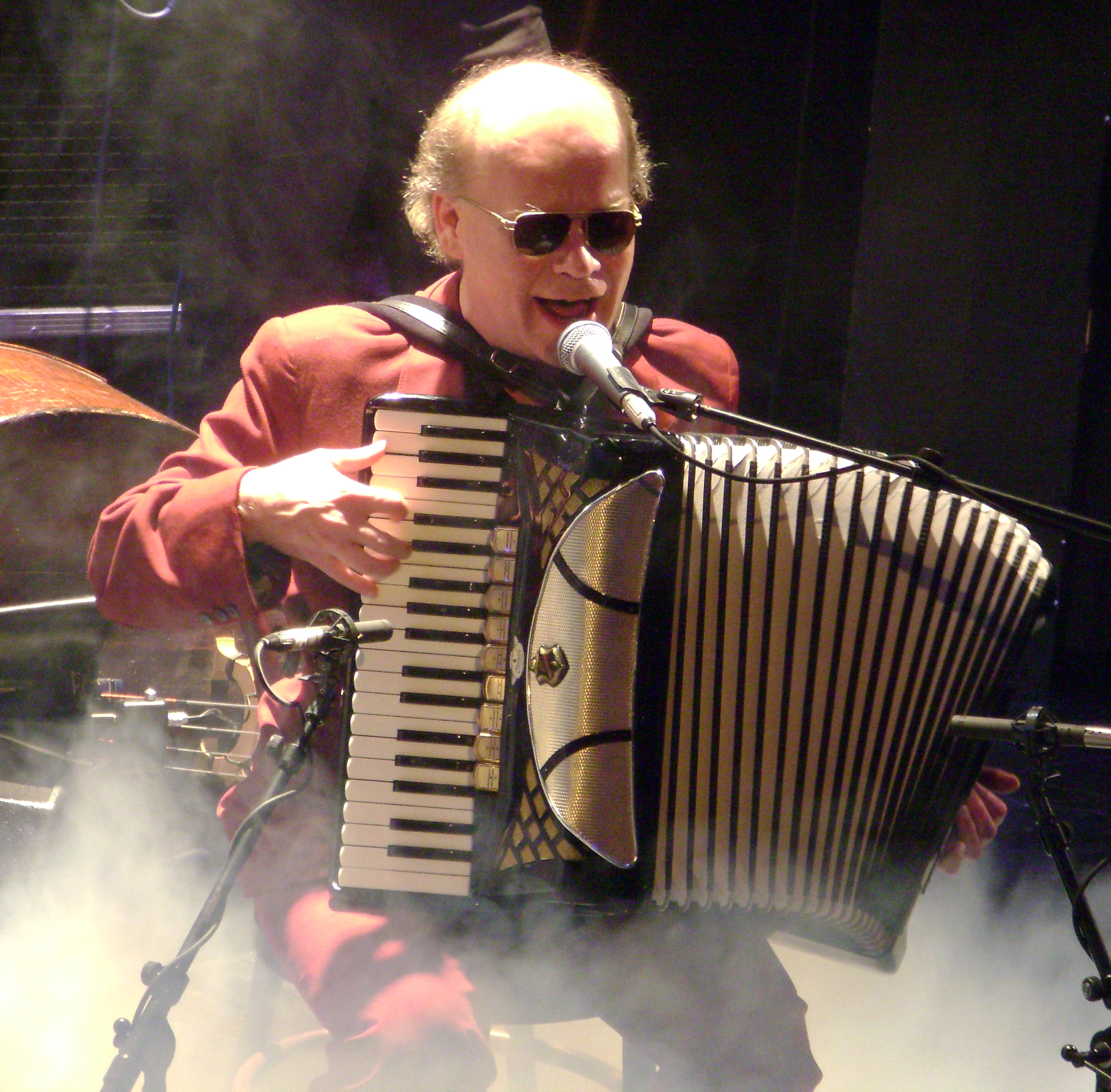
Otto Lechner in a concert with the Bethlehem All Stars, Innsbruck 2008

Otto Lechner (born February 25, 1964) is an Austrian accordionist.

Lechner taught himself to play the accordion starting at age four. He has been blind since age 15. Lechner is a member of the group Accordion Tribe and musical director of two ensembles in Vienna, Otto's Jazz Ensemble and Das Erste Wiener Strenge Kammerorchester. He lives in Vienna with his partner and collaborator, Anne Bennent.
