= Timo Alakotila =

Finnish composer, arranger, musician and music teacher

- Born: 15 July 1959 (age 67)
- Occupations: Composer, Arranger, and Musician

Timo Alakotila is a Finnish composer, arranger, and musician born 15 July 1959.

== Career ==
Timo Alakotila's range of music styles stretches from Finnish folk music of the pelimanni style over some jazz influences to more or less Finnish style Tango (music)tangos, and with some extensions to classical music. He is one of the founding members of the well-known Finnish folk fiddler group JPP of the Kaustinen tradition, where he plays harmonium, and in the similar group Troka. In both groups, he is one of the main arrangers and composers. Alakotila has worked with accordionist Maria Kalaniemi for more than ten years in several formats, including a duo, a trio and the group Aldargaz. Kalaniemi and Alakotila play both their own and each other's arrangements and compositions, as well as some traditional material.

Another of Alakotila's projects is Unto Tango Orchestra (Tango-orkesteri Unto), a tango orchestra that was formed to perform at Expo '98 in Lisbon, Portugal. This groups mainly plays Alakotila's rather chamber-music-like arrangements of Finnish tango. In 2004 BBC Concert Orchestra, JPP and Maria Kalaniemi performed music written by Alakotila for the occasion. Among his more "classic style" works is a folk-music/chamber hybrid, a concerto for accordion and orchestra, originally performed at the folk music festival Haapavesi Folk with Johanna Juhola as the soloist. Alakotila's piece, Pelimanni's Revenge, was arranged by violist, Ralph Farris, for the string quartet ETHEL and was released on their 2006 album Light (Cantaloupe Music).

Alakotila also works as a teacher at the Sibelius Academy and at the Helsinki Pop & Jazz Conservatory.
