= Music of Finland =

The music of Finland can be roughly divided into folk music, classical and contemporary art music, and contemporary popular music.

The folk music of Finland belongs to a broader musical tradition, common amongst Balto-Finnic people, sung in the so-called Kalevala metre. Though folk songs of the old variety became progressively rarer in western Finland, they remained common in far eastern parts of the country, mainly Savonia and Karelia. After the publication of Kalevala, this music gained popularity again. In the west, mainstream Nordic folk music traditions prevail. The Sami people of northern Finland have their own musical traditions, known as Sami music. Finnish folk music has undergone a roots revival, and has become a part of popular music.

In the field of classical and contemporary art music, Finland has produced exceptional numbers of musicians and composers.

Contemporary popular music includes a heavy metal scene like other Nordic countries, as well as prominent rock and pop bands, jazz musicians, hip hop performers and makers of dance music. A Schlager scene with bandstand dancing shows that the local variety of tango is popular.

== Folk music ==
The two major traditions of folk music in Finland are Kalevala and Nordic folk music or pelimanni (North Germanic spelman, "player of music").

=== Kalevala ===
Kalevala is older. Its most important form is runonlaulanta ("poem singing", or chanting), traditionally performed in a trochaic tetrametre using only the first five notes on a scale. Via alliteration, this type of singing tells stories about heroes such as Väinämöinen, Lemminkäinen, and Kullervo. The songs were memorised, not written down, and performed by a soloist, or by a soloist and a chorus in antiphony. The Vantaa Chamber Choir is an example of a choir that sings such poems in modern arrangements. Traditional Finnish instruments include the kantele, which is a chordophone, and was used in the 'Kalevala' by the hero Väinämöinen. More primitive instruments like the jouhikko (a bowed lyre) and the säkkipilli (Finnish bagpipe) had fallen into disuse, but are now finding new popularity in a folk revival.

Värttinä is a modern group more focused on Kalevala singing traditions and the kantele.

Suomen laulu sung by a choir in 1929.

=== Pelimanni ===
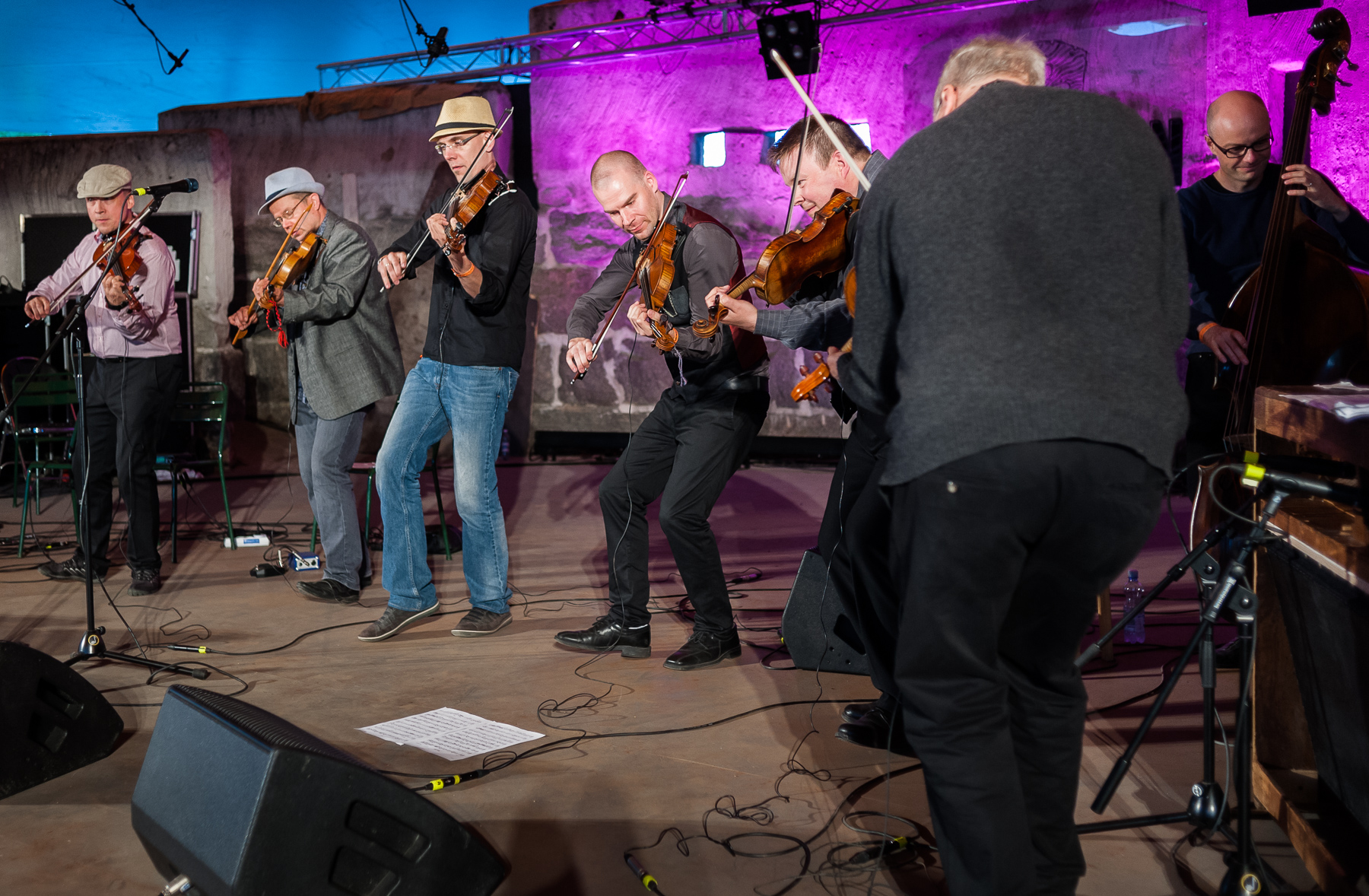
The folk music band JPP at the 2015 Kaustinen Folk Music Festival in Kaustinen, Finland

Pelimanni music is the Finnish version of Nordic folk dance music, and it is tonal. It came to Finland from Central Europe via Scandinavia in the 17th century, and in the 19th century, it replaced the Kalevalaic tradition. Pelimanni was generally played on the fiddle and clarinet. Later, the harmonium and accordions were added. Common dances in the Pelimanni traditions include: polka, mazurka, schottische, quadrille, waltz, and minuet.

A form of rhyming sleighride singing called rekilaulu also became popular in the 17th century. Despite opposition from most of the churches in Finland, rekilaulu remained popular and is today a common element in pop songs. Since the 1920s, several popular Finnish performers have used rekilaulu as an integral part of their repertoire. Early pioneers in this field of pop rekilaulu included Arthur Kylander, while Erkki Rankaviita, Kuunkuiskaajat, and Pinnin Pojat sustained the tradition.

Early in the 20th century, the region of Kaustinen became a center of innovation for Pelimanni music. Friiti Ojala and Antti Järvelä were fiddlers of the period. Konsta Jylhä and the other members of Purpuripelimannit (formed in 1946) became perhaps the most influential group of this period. Well-known Finnish folk music groups of today in the Kaustinen tradition include JPP, Frigg (although part Norwegian), and Troka. Another important folk musician of today is the accordionist Maria Kalaniemi.

Sikerma Laulaunaytelmasta performed in 1929.

Common instruments today include trumpets, horns, and whistle. Important virtuosos include Leena Joutsenlahti, Teppo Repo and Virpi Forsberg.

In the 20th century, influences from modern music and dances such as jazz and foxtrot led to distinctively Finnish forms of dance music, such as humppa and jenkka.

=== Sami music ===
The Sami of northern Finland, Sweden, and Norway are known for highly spiritual songs called joik, reminiscent of a few types of Native American singing. The same word sometimes refers to lavlu or vuelie songs, though this is technically incorrect. Hip hop artist Amoc is noted for rapping in Inari Sami, a Sami language from the area of Inari.

== Classical and art music ==
=== Classical music ===
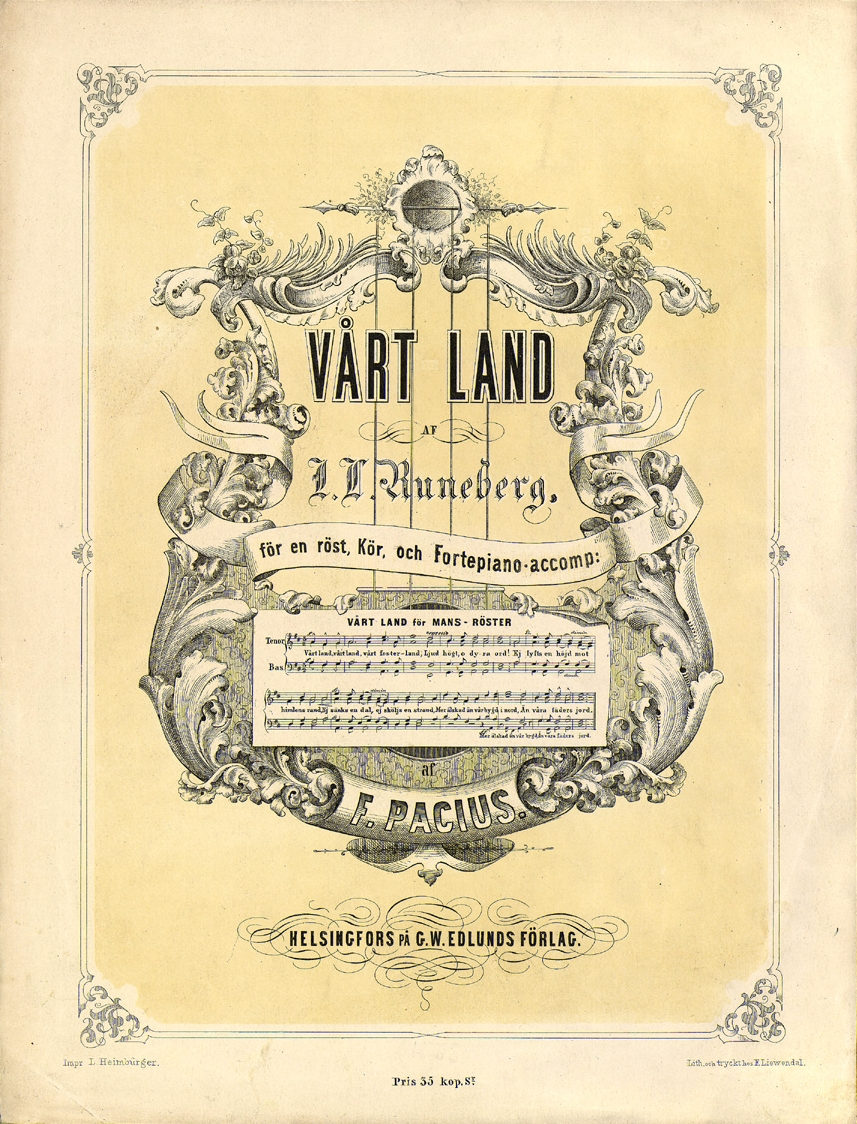
Vårt land (Maamme), the national anthem of Finland, from 1863

In the 18th century, public concerts were established in Turku and Erik Tulindberg wrote six famous string quartets. After Russia's 1809 annexation of Finland, the cities of Viipuri and Helsinki became cultural centers and opera became popular. The first Finnish opera was written by the German composer Fredrik Pacius in 1852. Pacius also wrote Maamme/Vårt land (Our Land), Finland's national anthem and founded Akademiska Sångföreningen in year 1838, the oldest still active choir in Finland.

In 1874, the Society for Culture and Education (Kansanvalistusseura) was founded to provide opportunities for artistic expression, beginning with the Jyväskylä festival in 1881. The festival, organized on Estonian roots, continues today. In 1883, the Helsinki University Chorus (Ylioppilaskunnan Laulajat) was founded as a Finnish-language choir amidst the mostly Swedish-speaking scene. The same year conductor Robert Kajanus founded the Helsinki Philharmonic Orchestra and Martin Wegelius founded what became the Sibelius Academy.

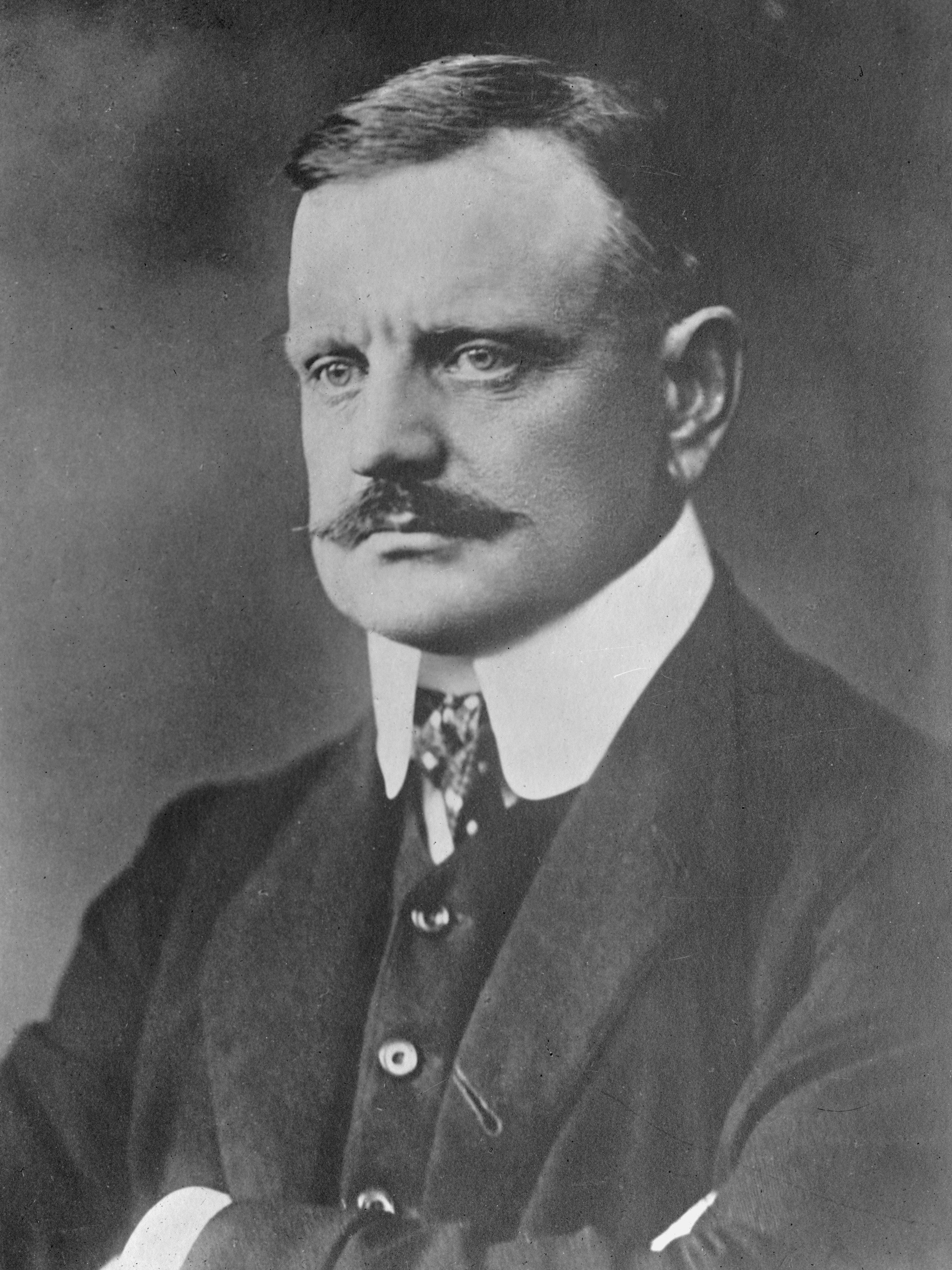
Jean Sibelius (1865–1957), the national composer of Finland

In the 1890s, Finnish nationalism based on the Kalevala spread, and Jean Sibelius became famous for his vocal symphony Kullervo. He received a grant to study poetry singers in Karelia and continued his rise as the first internationally prominent Finnish musician. In 1899 he composed Finlandia, which played an important role in Finnish independence. He remains one of Finland's most popular national figures and national symbol.

Alongside Sibelius, national romanticism sprouted other composers who contributed in the formation of a distinct Finnish style of music. Heino Kaski was a composer of small chamber music pieces; Erkki Melartin's output includes six symphonies; Yrjö Kilpinen composed solo songs, as well as Leevi Madetoja, and Toivo Kuula. In the 1930s composers including Uuno Klami and Yrjö Kilpinen rose to popularity. Kilpinen's approach was somewhat nationalistic, whereas Klami had Karelian influences, leaning towards French models.

Finland had a lively classical music scene. Composers were supported by conductors such as Mikko Franck, Esa-Pekka Salonen (also a notable composer), Jukka-Pekka Saraste, Osmo Vänskä, Susanna Mälkki, Leif Segerstam and Sakari Oramo. Many Finnish singers and instrumentalists achieved international success. Among them are opera singers Martti Talvela, Karita Mattila, Matti Salminen, Soile Isokoski and Topi Lehtipuu, pianists Ralf Gothoni, Olli Mustonen, Risto Lauriala, Janne Mertanen and Paavali Jumppanen, as well as clarinettist Kari Kriikku and violinist Pekka Kuusisto. Practically all prominent Finnish musicians perform both classical and contemporary art music.

The opening of the new Finnish National Opera in 1993 and the new Helsingin Musiikkitalo in 2011 strengthened the position of classical and art music. The orchestra network in Finland might be proportionally the densest in the world, including 30 member orchestras of the Association of Finnish Symphony Orchestras.

=== Opera ===
Aino Ackté and other opera singers founded the Finnish Opera in 1911. Ackté began a festival in Savonlinna the following year; this was the precursor of the Savonlinna Opera Festival, which launched in the 1960s, shortly before the new Finnish opera became famous in the 1970s. Leevi Madetoja's 1924 Pohjalaisia, an operatic allegory about Russian oppression during previous decades, became popular during the 1920s. At roughly the same time, Aarre Merikanto composed the opera Juha to the libretto by Aino Ackté, who rejected it and asked Leevi Madetoja to compose another version instead; Merikanto's Juha was first performed after the composer's death in 1958, and became regarded as an underrated masterwork.

Aulis Sallinen started a new wave of Finnish opera in the 1970s with The Horseman and The Red Line. The Red Line earned productions in Moscow, London, and New York City. Along with Sallinen's stage works, Joonas Kokkonen's opera The Last Temptations contributed to that era's rise of Finnish opera music. More recent major operas by Finnish composers include among others Kaija Saariaho's L'Amour de loin and Adriana mater as well as Olli Kortekangas's Isän tyttö ("Daddy's Girl").

Since the 1960s, the Lahti Symphony Orchestra's reputation as one of the most important Scandinavian orchestras was cemented by conductor Osmo Vänskä; this helped to cause a boom in opera's popularity during the 1980s, rescuing a form increasingly seen as archaic elsewhere. The Savonlinna Opera Festival reopened in 1967.

Martti Talvela, Karita Mattila and Jorma Hynninen became international opera stars, while composers like Kalevi Aho, Olli Kortekangas, Paavo Heininen, Aulis Sallinen, Einojuhani Rautavaara, Atso Almila and Ilkka Kuusisto composed successful operas.

=== Contemporary art music ===
The first wave of post-classical music in Finland came about in the 1920s with modernists Aarre Merikanto, Väinö Raitio and Sulho Ranta. However, this movement was tamed by the growing nationalistic tendency in the arts before the Second World War. In the 1940s, Erik Bergman and Joonas Kokkonen gained popularity and added technical innovations to Finnish music. A generation of Finnish composers turned to modernism, such as Einojuhani Rautavaara and Usko Meriläinen, while the neoclassical style found voice in the music of Einar Englund. The 1950s saw an increase in international attention on Finnish music and helped modernize Finnish composing.

The forming of the Ears Open! society in 1977 turned out to be the major change in Finnish art music. From its circles emerged composers and musicians who achieved worldwide success, notably conductor-composer Esa-Pekka Salonen, and composers Eero Hämeenniemi, Kaija Saariaho, Magnus Lindberg and Jouni Kaipainen. The early Ears Open! society followed Central European modernism along the lines of Pierre Boulez and Karlheinz Stockhausen, but also showed interest in post-war Polish School composers such as Witold Lutoslawski. Ears Open! was followed by the forming of Avanti! Chamber Orchestra in 1983, which offered a platform for composers and instrumentalists to introduce new works and stylistic flows in Finland.

In the 21st century, the modernist movement waned, but is still represented by composers such as Veli-Matti Puumala and Lotta Wennäkoski. Juhani Nuorvala is a rare minimalist, while Osmo Tapio Räihälä and Sebastian Fagerlund lean more towards post-modernism.

Performance of contemporary art music blossomed in Finland, with specialized groups including Uusinta Chamber Ensemble and Zagros. The most important stages for contemporary art music are the established festivals Time of Music in Viitasaari, Musica nova Helsinki and Tampere Biennale, as well as the Klang Concert Series in Helsinki.

=== Experimental ===
Classical elements and mysterious soundscapes characterize the compositions of Finnish film score composer Diana Ringo. Popular singer Anna Eriksson creates experimental music and film scores.

== Popular music ==
=== Iskelmä ===
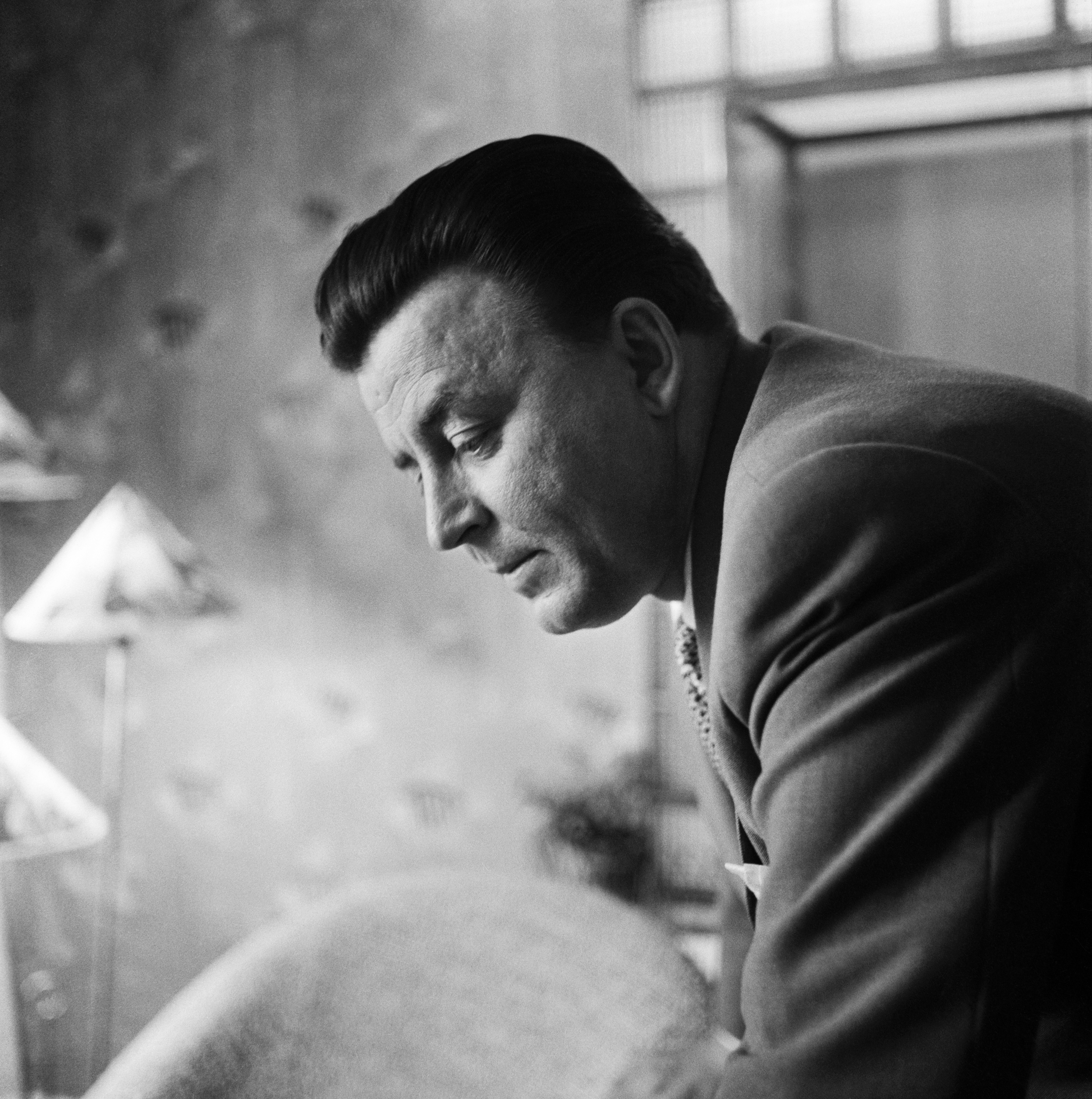
Olavi Virta in 1956

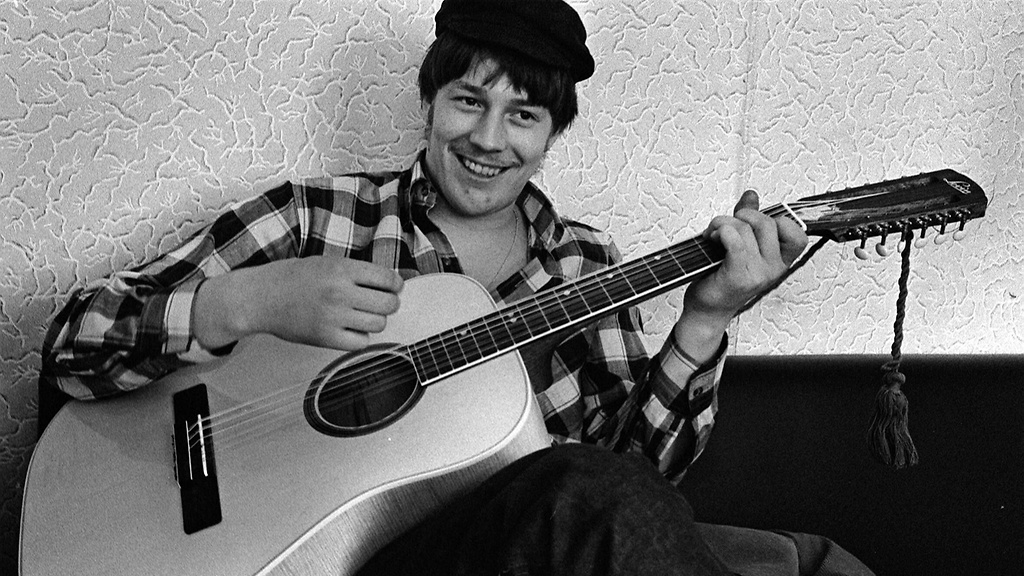
Irwin Goodman pictured in 1966

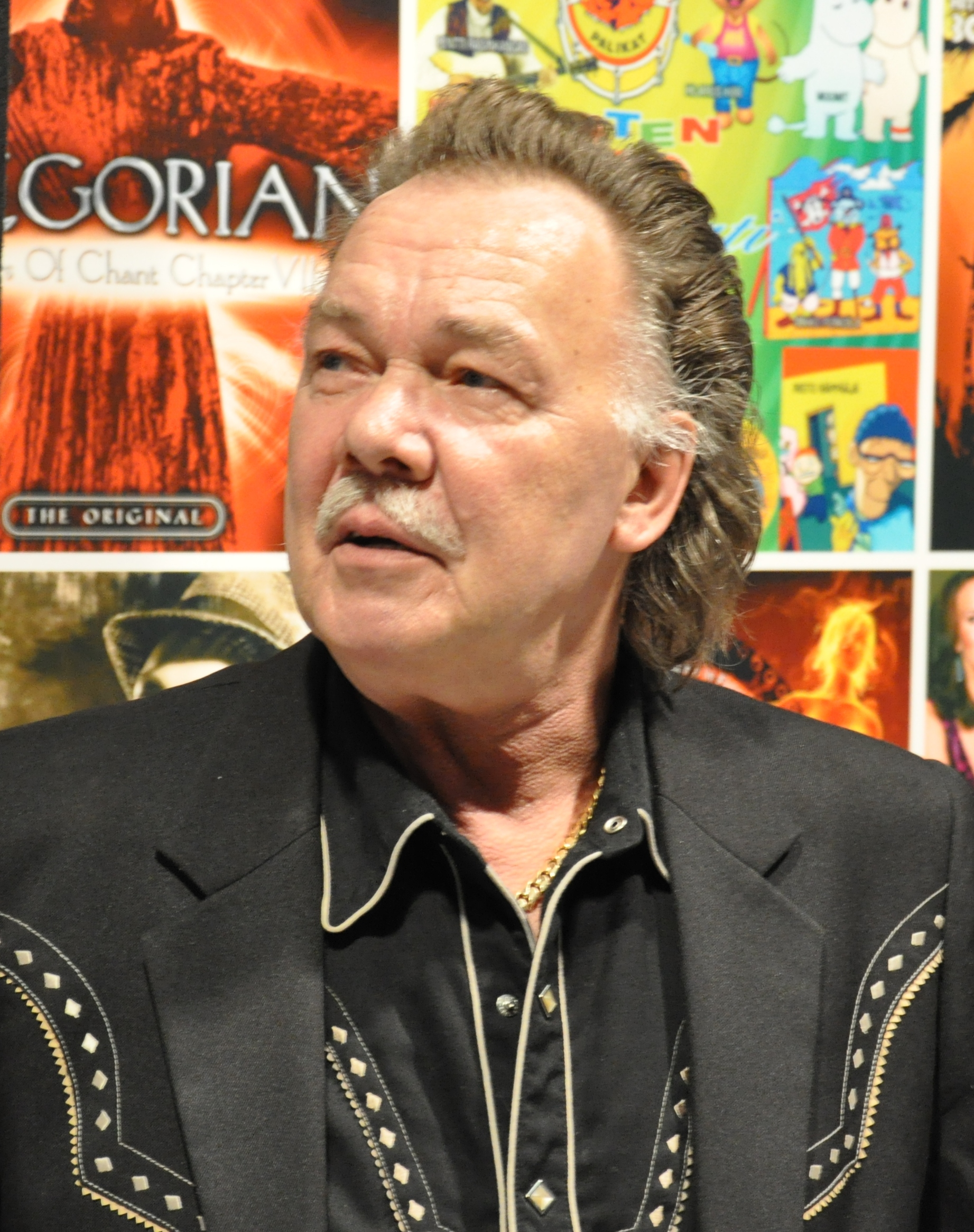
Kari Tapio in 2009

Iskelmä (coined directly from the German word Schlager, meaning hit) is a traditional Finnish word for a sentimental popular song. Georg Malmstén started his career in the 1930s. Others, such as Dallapé, incorporated then-novel jazz elements. After World War II but before rock and roll, names such as Olavi Virta or Tapio Rautavaara were popular singers, and Toivo Kärki and Reino Helismaa were popular songwriters. Foreign musical genres such as tango found domestic audiences. Some of the most acclaimed Finnish chanteuses of this time period were Laila Kinnunen, Carola, Annikki Tähti, Brita Koivunen and Vieno Kekkonen.

From the late 1960s, Irwin Goodman (a.k.a. Antti Hammarberg) combined iskelmä and protest songs, gaining popularity with humorous tunes penned by Vexi Salmi, who also wrote for other Finnish artists. Juha "Watt" Vainio was another popular songwriter, known for Finnish renditions of many international hits, but for his own songs and performing in his own right. In the 1970s, "Finnhits" compilation records of various artists continued in the iskelmä tradition. Rural-flavoured humppa became a successful variation of iskelmä, later parodied by Eläkeläiset. Other popular Finnish iskelmä singers are Katri Helena, Danny (a.k.a. Ilkka Lipsanen), Fredi, Eino Grön, Erkki Junkkarinen, Frederik (a.k.a. Ilkka Sysimetsä), Marion Rung, Tapani Kansa, Kirka (a.k.a. Kirill Babitzin), Matti ja Teppo, Jari Sillanpää, and Kikka Sirén.

Like Finnish music in general, iskelmä is written mostly in minor keys. The melodies have a distinguishable Finnish "flavour" that is somewhat related to Russian and Italian melodies and harmonies although Scandinavian and Anglo-American influence can also be heard.

Iskelmä music is essentially dance music, and it is mostly performed on dancing stages and halls around the country. The best known and perhaps most loved and respected dance is the tango, which originated in Argentina. Notably, the annual Finnish contest for iskelmä artists is "Tangomarkkinat", meaning "The Tango Marketplace"; many of the stars of contemporary iskelmä have won this competition and it is a major spectacle in Finland, comparable with the Sanremo Music Festival in Italy.

Iskelmä is typically non-urban music and its greatest popularity is situated to the countryside and smaller cities.

Traditionally accordion has been the major instrument in iskelmä music and it is still played, but has in most cases been replaced by guitar, electric piano and synthesizer. These, with drums, electric bass and occasional use of saxophone form the basic instrumentation of iskelmä.

=== Rock music ===
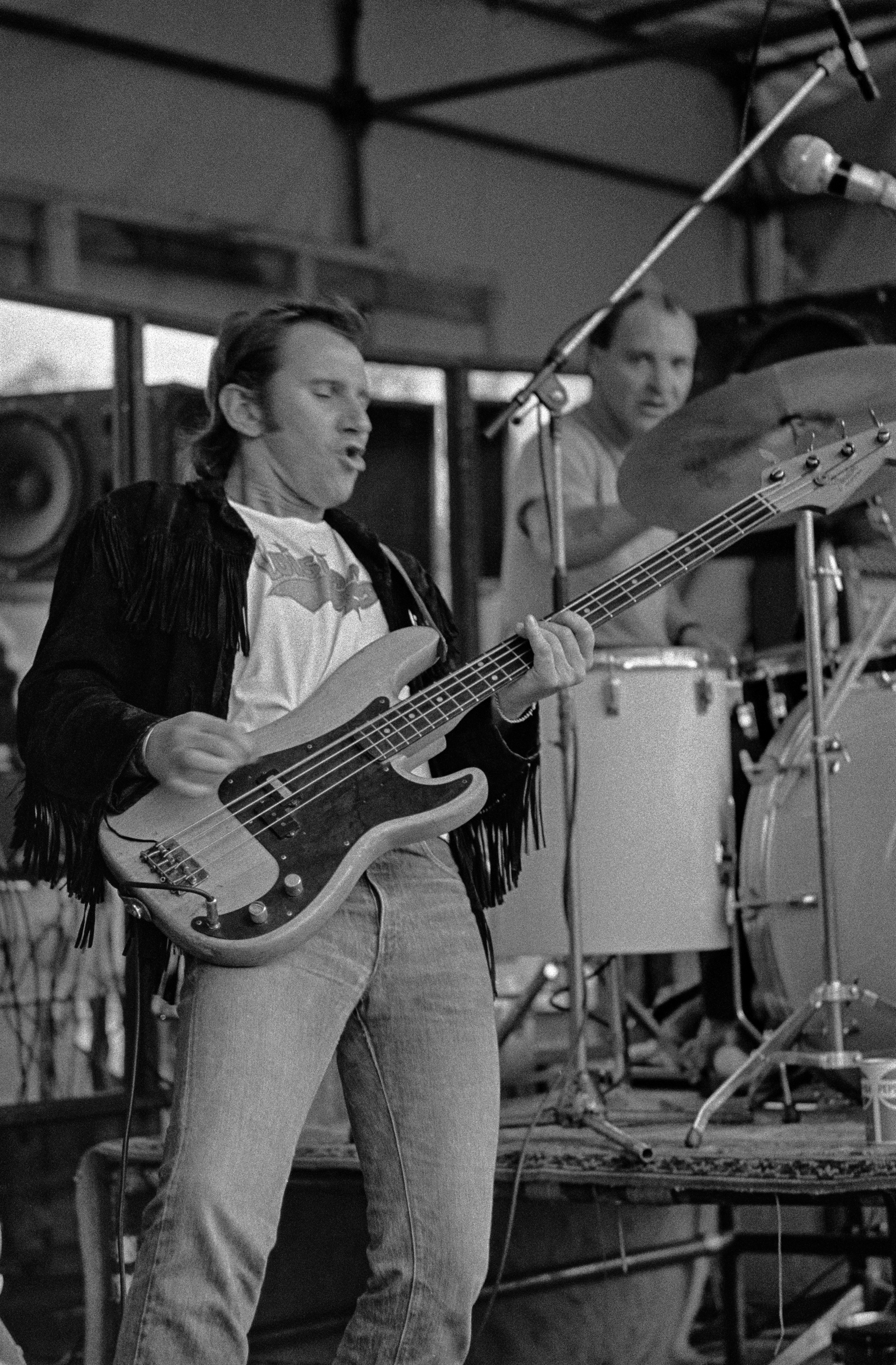
Hurriganes members Cisse Häkkinen (with bass) and Remu Aaltonen (with drums) performing in Kaivopuisto, Helsinki in 1980

Rock arrived in Finland in the 1950s. Founded in the 1960s, Love Records was one of the first domestic record labels dedicated to Finnish rock music, even though the label's roster also included jazz and political songs. During the late 1960s, Blues Section, a group inspired by Jimi Hendrix and The Who gained a reputation as "the first Finnish band of international quality". Another band that gained some reputation was Apollo that later featured jazz-drummer Edward Vesala. The early work had little typical Finnish "flavour" and most bands covered music by international bands. Blues Section later developed into internationally acknowledged "superband" Wigwam, featuring English singer Jim Pembroke, who wrote many of their songs. Originally they also played songs with Finnish lyrics written by Jukka Gustafsson such as the classical "Luulosairas".

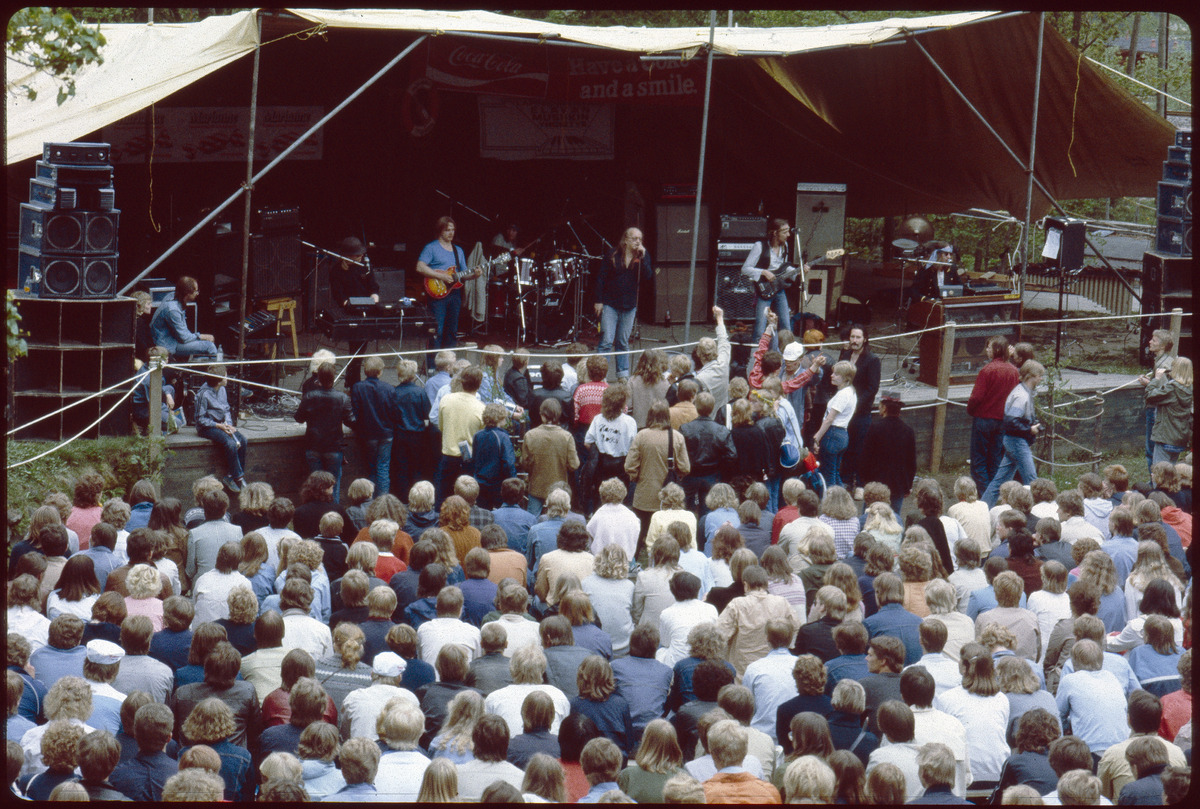
Juice Leskinen on a rock tour

During the 1970s, progressive rock groups Wigwam and Tasavallan Presidentti received critical acclaim in the United Kingdom, but fame evaded them. Pekka Streng was one of the pioneers of Finnish rock music via his progressive spiritual folkrock and Finnish lyrics. The 2000s experienced a Streng-renaissance and one of his songs became an international club hit. Hard-rock group Hurriganes was popular in Sweden as well as in Finland. Hector, Juice Leskinen, Dave Lindholm and many other successful artists of the 1970s sang in Finnish, which continued in later years. During the 1970s these artists birthed "suomirock".

Suomirock literally means Finnish rock music. However, its meaning is more specific, covering rock/pop music with Finnish lyrics. As a genre it started in the 1980s following the punk rock movement. It is a form of rock music that is recognizably Finnish with Finnish lyrics. A more general and recent term is "suomipop". The boundaries between what is considered "rock" and "pop" blurred and depend upon personal preference. Traditionally in iskelmä the performers did not write their songs, while in the rock scene the singer-songwriter ruled. In the 2000s new performers such as Idols songcontest winner Ari Koivunen performed even heavy rock in the iskelmä manner, which used to be typical only in iskelmä-scene.

The punk movement arrived in Finland in 1977 and influenced Finnish youth culture. Pelle Miljoona was the most famous Finnish punk singer. Terveet Kädet started the hardcore punk-wave. Eppu Normaali also started during this period, (later to change its style from punk to rock/pop). At the same time, Finland had a massive movement of Elvis and rockabilly fans, later parodied by Finnish lo-fi punk band Liimanarina.

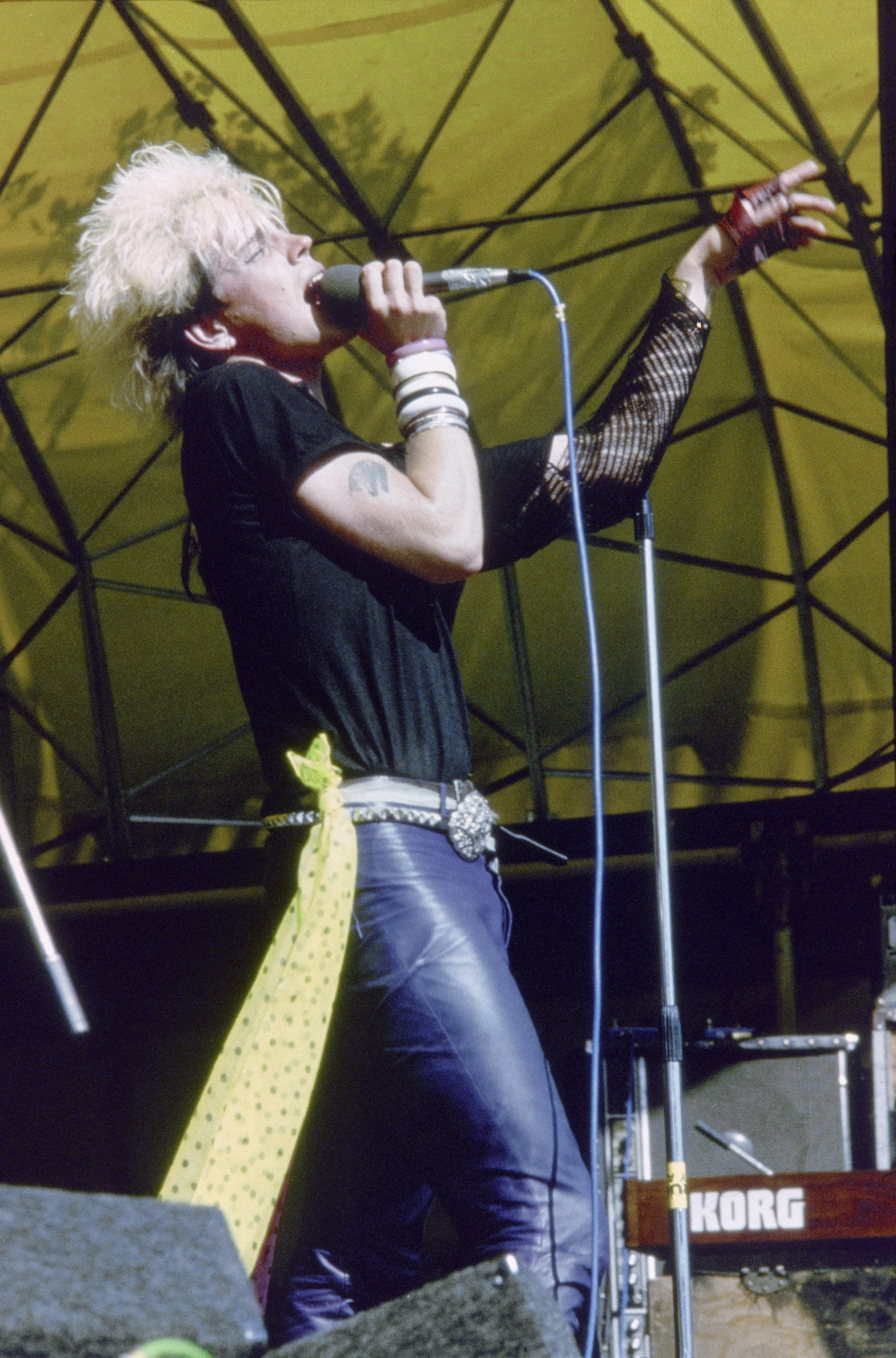
Dingo's lead singer Pertti Neumann performing in 1984

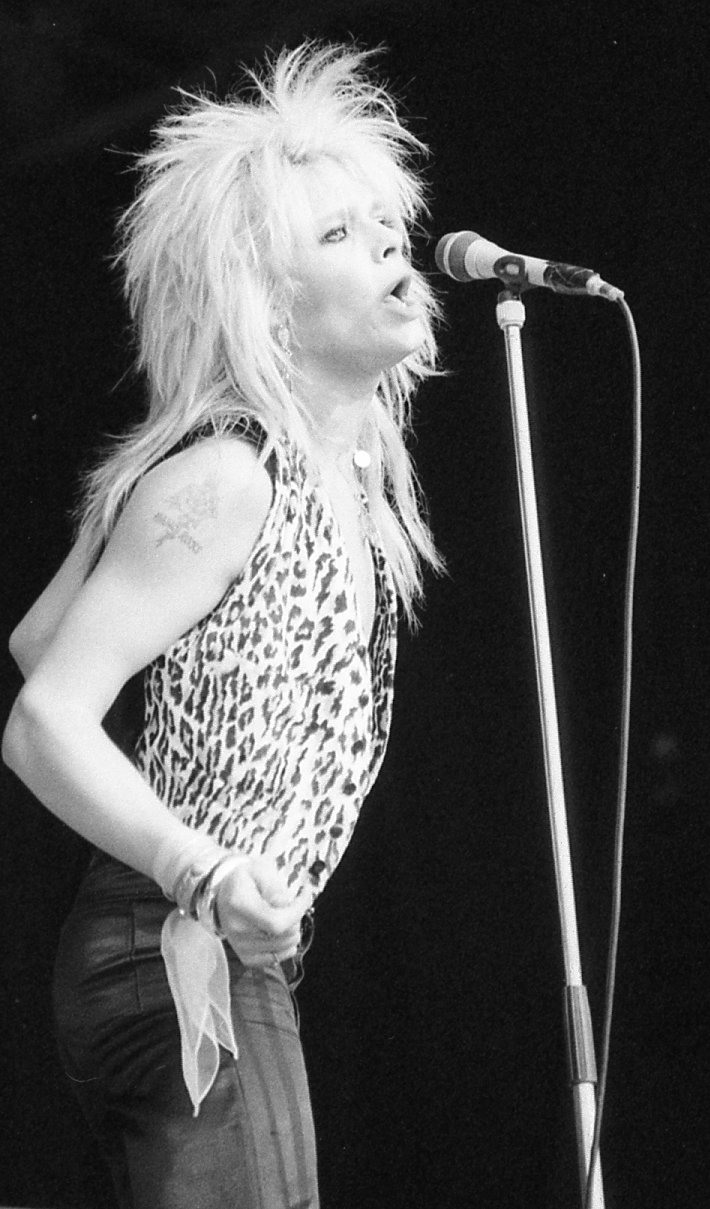
Hanoi Rocks's lead singer Michael Monroe performing in 1980s

In the 1980s, most favoured artists were punkish Dingo and heavy-hearted Yö (lit. 'night'), both singing their lyrics in Finnish and being from Pori. In the underground, Ismo Alanko, considered by many as the foremost Finnish rock lyricist, gained a legendary status with his punkish groups Hassisen Kone and Sielun Veljet. Kauko Röyhkä was another literate underground icon, leaning musically towards Velvet Underground. The 1980s showed short international fame for punk style glam rock band Hanoi Rocks. Hanoi Rocks and Smack have been cited as an influence by major American bands such as Guns N' Roses and Foo Fighters.

Heavy metal was popular in Finland during the 1980s, producing groups like Stone, the latter being a fondly remembered speed metal act. Hardcore punk is also popular in Finland, including bands such as Endstand, Abduktio, I Walk the Line, and Lighthouse Project.

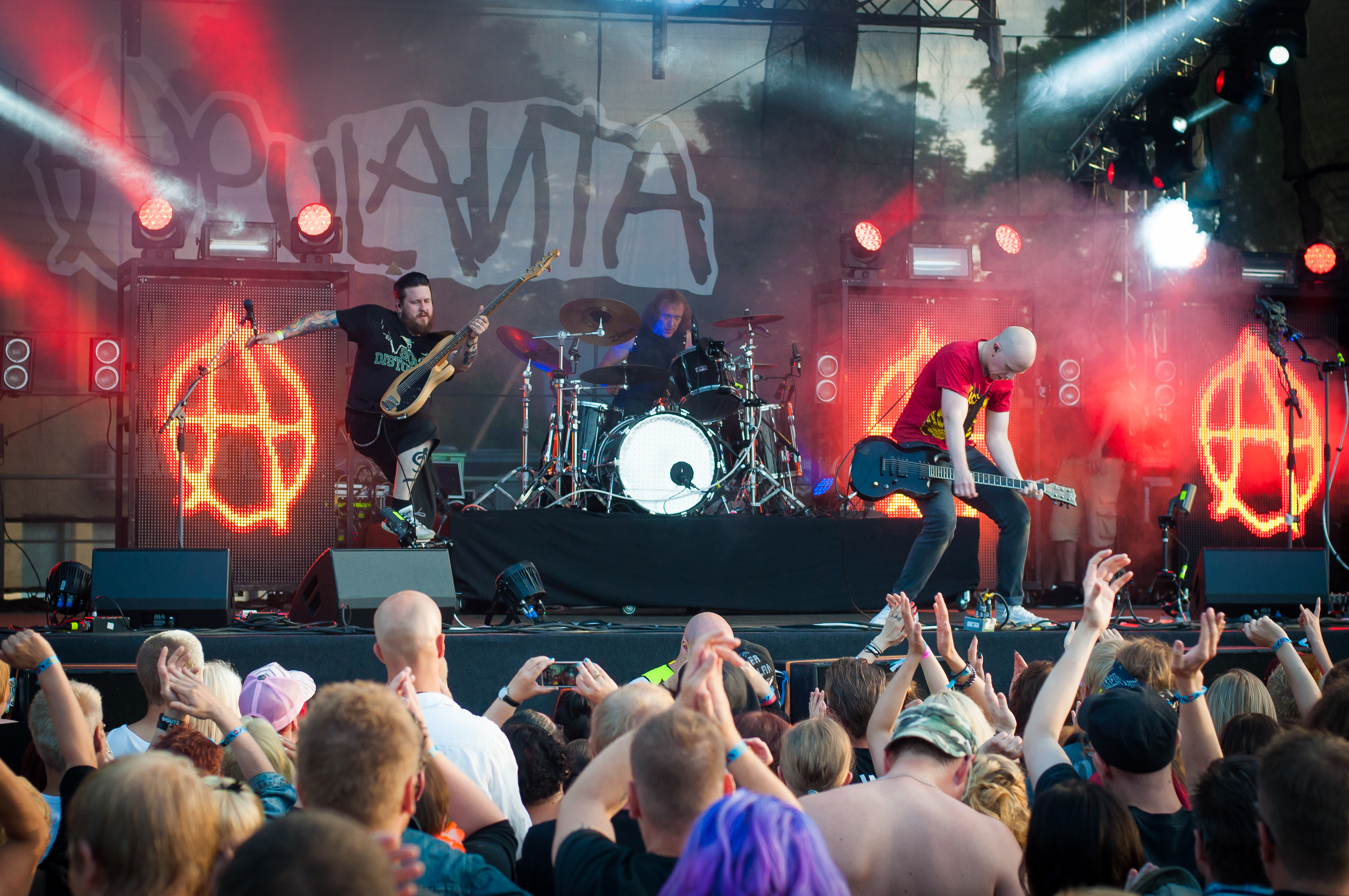
Apulanta performing at the 2014 Rakuuna Rock festival

In the early 1990s Finnish rock parody group the Leningrad Cowboys flourished. It was an international rock comedy band that grew out of the Finnish comedy band Sleepy Sleepers. Its members appeared in Aki Kaurismäki's comedy film Leningrad Cowboys Go America. They performed live at the MTV Music Awards in New York City in 1994, together with the full Red Army Choir, performing "Sweet Home Alabama". This was the biggest TV audience for any Finnish music artist ever. Leningrad Cowboys were famous for outrageous outfits including ridiculous rock-a-billy hairdos and ultra-pointed shoes. The band remained popular in parts of Europe.

Finnish bands tend to write lyrics in English to broaden their audience. However, 1990s bands such as Apulanta, Miljoonasade, Ultra Bra and the shamanic art-punk group CMX found success with Finnish lyrics. The hard-to-define electronic country garage rock group 22 Pistepirkko got excellent reviews in the Finnish rock press and reached cult status in Central Europe. Other notable Finnish cult rock groups of this era include the psychedelic band Hendrixian Kingston Wall that was influenced by shamanism and genres of electronic dance music, and equally psychedelic but gothic, gloomy, and heavy, Mana Mana.

A band that enjoyed critical and commercial success in the 2000s is The Rasmus. After eleven years and several domestic releases, the band gained attention in Europe. Their Dead Letters (2003) album sold 1.5 million units worldwide and garnered eight gold and five platinum album designations. The single "In the Shadows" placed on Top 10 charts in eleven countries and was the most played video on MTV Europe for 2005. The Helsinki natives released their follow-up album, Hide From The Sun, domestically in 2005, r eaching the U.S. in 2006. To promote the U.S. release, the band toured with the Welsh band Lostprophets. The album Black Roses was released worldwide on 29 September 2008. It was produced by Desmond Child and the first single was called Livin' in a World Without You. The band continued in the 2020s and competed in Eurovision Song Contest 2022.

=== Heavy metal ===
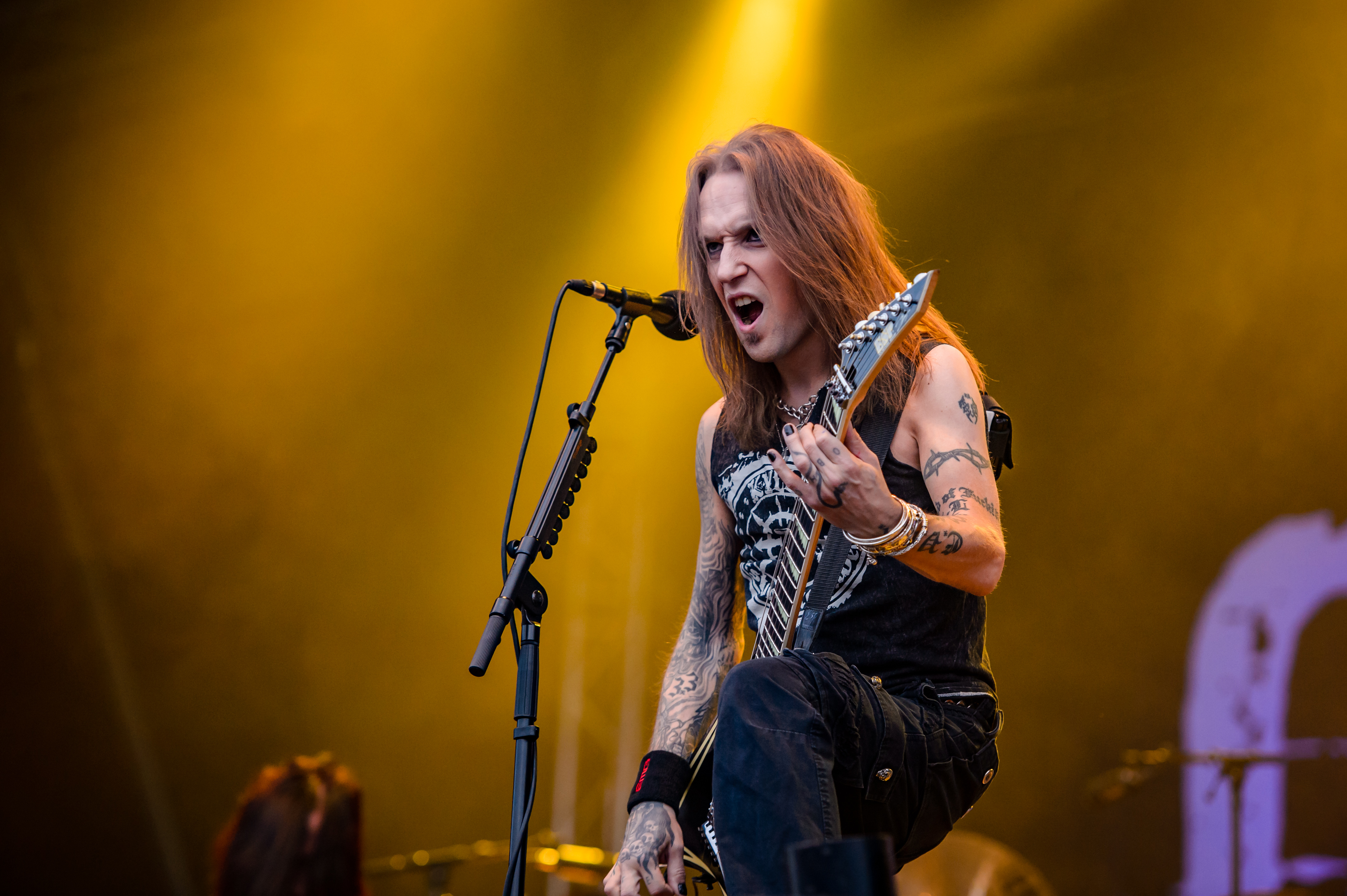
Alexi Laiho, one of the founding members of Children of Bodom, at the 2016 Rockharz Open Air Festival in Ballenstedt, Germany

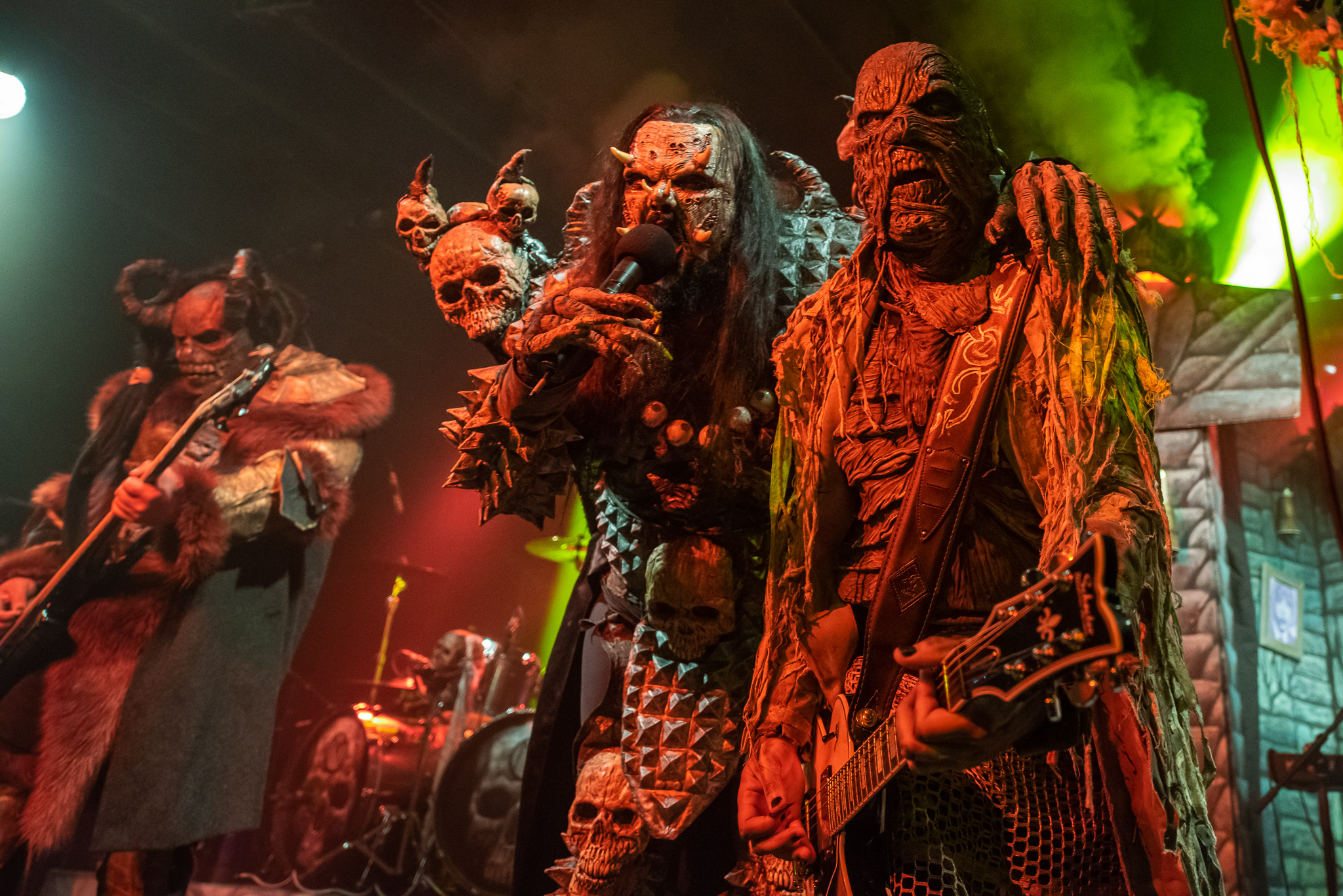
Monster band Lordi at the 2018 Hirsch Festival in Nuremberg, Germary

Finland is known for heavy metal acts, including from the death metal, black metal, doom metal, folk metal, power metal, and symphonic metal subgenres.

Finland hosts a strong underground doom metal scene more focused on the depressive mood of the genre, evoking intense grief. The bands play with slow tempos and melodic tones, creating an atmosphere of darkness and melancholia. This scene was kick-started by Rigor Mortis (which, due to an older US band with the same name, changed their name to Spiritus Mortis), which originated in 1987. Notable bands include Reverend Bizarre, Minotauri, Dolorian, Shape of Despair, Swallow the Sun, Thergothon, Skepticism and Unholy.

In the later 1990s the symphonic metal group Apocalyptica played Metallica cover songs as cello quartets and sold half a million records worldwide. The recently retired Timo Rautiainen & Trio Niskalaukaus were one of Finland's most popular metal acts in the early 2000s, after leaving late 1980s – early 1990s cult band Lyijykomppania. Children's power metal band Hevisaurus became popular in Finland.

Finnish metal bands attained worldwide success within the underground metal scene. Examples of such bands include Stratovarius and Sonata Arctica, and Children of Bodom.

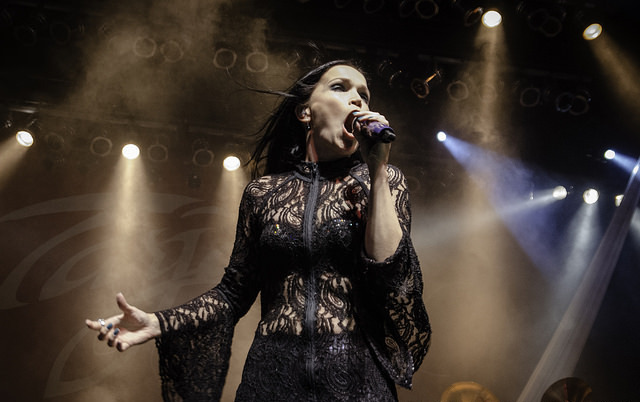
Tarja Turunen

Nightwish is considered a pioneer of symphonic metal that mixes in power metal and gothic metal and had Tarja Turunen, a classical soprano, as its vocalist until 2005. The band received platinum and gold certifications for its albums sales in many countries and became the third best selling Finnish artist. The band was nominated for awards and took home 11 Emma-gala awards, the Echo award, the Mtv Europe music award, the World music award and the Metal Storm award. In 2000 the band participated in the Finnish qualification for the Eurovision Song Contest, reaching second place.

Kotiteollisuus was one of Finland's most popular bands, producing one platinum and several gold albums and winning Emma-awards in 2003 and 2005 for best metal record ("Helvetistä itään") and best DVD ("Kotiteollisuus"), respectively.

Finnish hard rock band Lordi won the 2006 Eurovision Song Contest with a record 292 points, Finland's first-ever victory. They submitted "Hard Rock Hallelujah", and they celebrated their win with a free concert in Market Square in Helsinki, on 26 May 2006. They broke the world record for karaoke singing with about 80,000 voices singing "Hard Rock Hallelujah". Lordi was one of the most watched competitors of the Eurovision Song Contest internationally, because the band aroused positive media interest, while some foreigners accused Lordi of satanism.

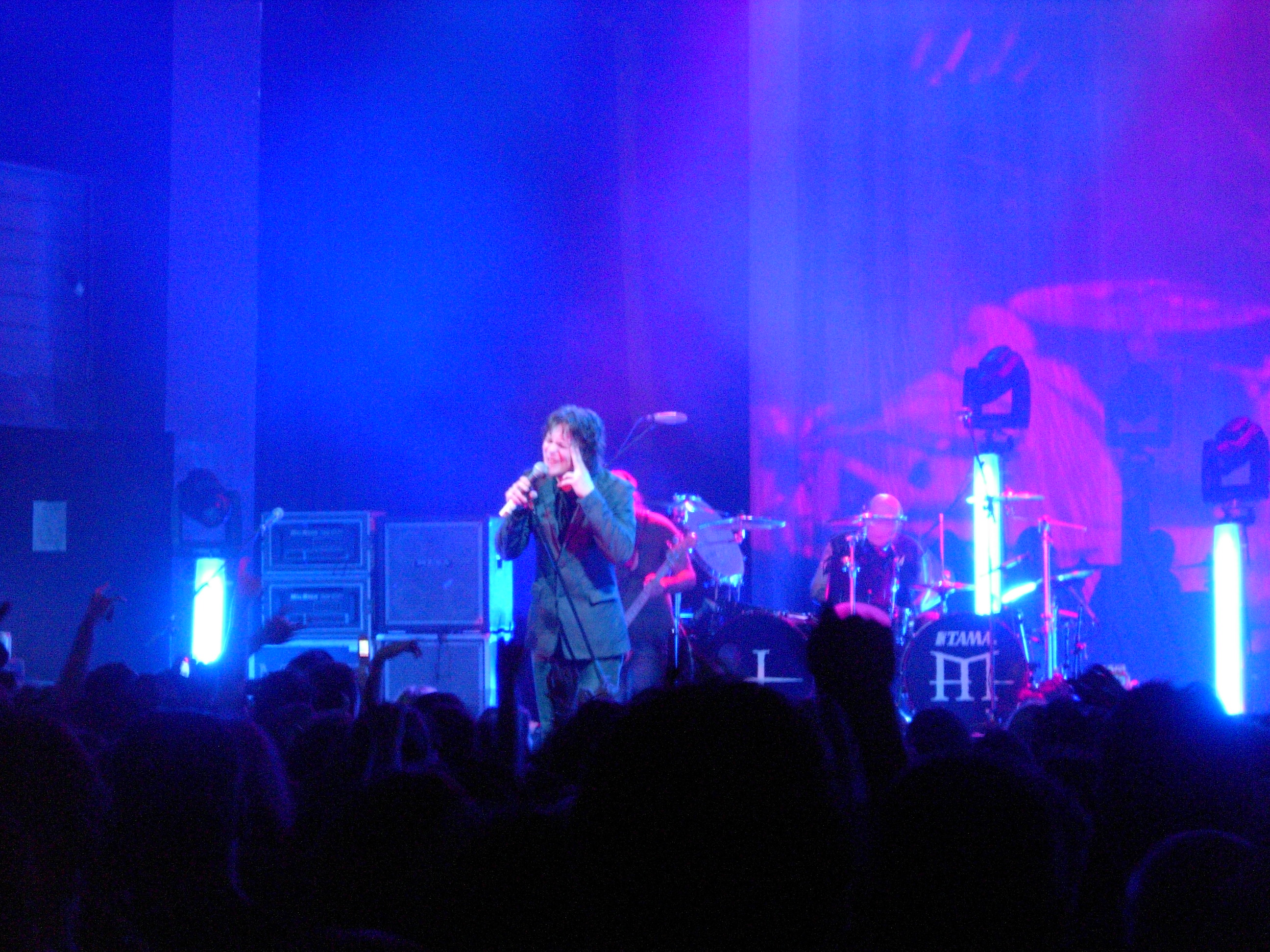
An internationally successful HIM band performing in Milan, Italy in 2005

From the beginning of 2000, HIM reached greater sales and more international success than any other band to come from Finland. Going gold with their first official American release Dark Light, of which two singles, "Wings of a Butterfly" and "Killing Loneliness", reached number one and two, respectively, on the Finnish Singles Chart. The former cracked the top ten in the UK. Several Finnish bands have followed the lead of that band; Entwine, Lullacry, and Poisonblack are such bands.

Heavy metal group Blind Channel finished sixth in Eurovision Song Contest 2021 with their song "Dark Side".

Other well-known metal bands are Amorphis, Beherit, Impaled Nazarene, Throne of Chaos, Turisas and Ensiferum.

Academic engagement with Finnish popular music has also taken the form of collaborative, field-defining scholarship, notably in edited volumes that situate Finnish music within its historical, cultural, and social contexts. Edited by Toni-Matti Karjalainen and Kimi Kärki, Made in Finland: Studies in Popular Music provides a comprehensive overview of twentieth- and twenty-first-century Finnish popular music. Chapter 4 of Made in Finland: Studies in Popular Music, "And So, Finland Became a Heavy Metal Nation," authored by Karjalainen, examines the early internationalisation of Finnish heavy metal and its expansion in the early 2000s, when metal became Finland’s most prominent and commercially successful popular music export. The chapter traces key phases, milestones, and media visibility, while analysing recurring patterns of cultural narrative exchange between local and global contexts from the late 1980s to the early 2000s.

Additionally, the doctoral research by Charlotte Doesburg examines the adaptation of the Kalevala and other Finnish folk poetry in Finnish metal lyrics. Doesburg's study develops a four part taxonomy of lyrical reworkings, consisting of transposition, commentary, analogous transformation, and stylistic imitation, ranging from brief allusions to full reworkings in Kalevala metre. Through close textual analysis and interviews with lyricists, the research identifies recurring connections between metal lyrics, Finnish folk traditions, and constructions of national identity. It concludes that Finnish metal artists often possess detailed knowledge of the Kalevala and embed their lyrics within Finnish national identity through references to art, history, nature, and language, positioning metal music as an active site of cultural continuity and reinterpretation.

=== Hip-hop ===
Finland hip-hop bands emerged during the late 1990s to early 2000s. One of the first Finnish Hip Hop records with lyrics in English was recorded at Vernissa (C) Manus / (P) Johanna Kustannus 1991 by Damn The Band. Later Finland offered Nuera with MC's Skem (Henry Kaprali) and Dream (Petri Laurila) from Tampere region. Nuera's first release was in 1992. Same guys, together with DJ K2 were also behind a hip-hop based radio show on YleX. The first popular hip-hop band to break the taboo of making rap lyrics in Finnish (rapping in Finnish was not regarded as serious business because the first artists to do this in the early 1990s such as Raptori, Nikke T and Pääkköset were humorous project and were popular mostly among children) was Fintelligens arguably one of the most successful hip hop bands in Finland. Let's not forget about Ceebrolistics, their first cassette single Sping was released in 1995 their lyrics has been both in Finnish and English. Few other important popular but underground acts were MC Taakibörsta, Notkea Rotta and Paleface just to mention a few from the same era.

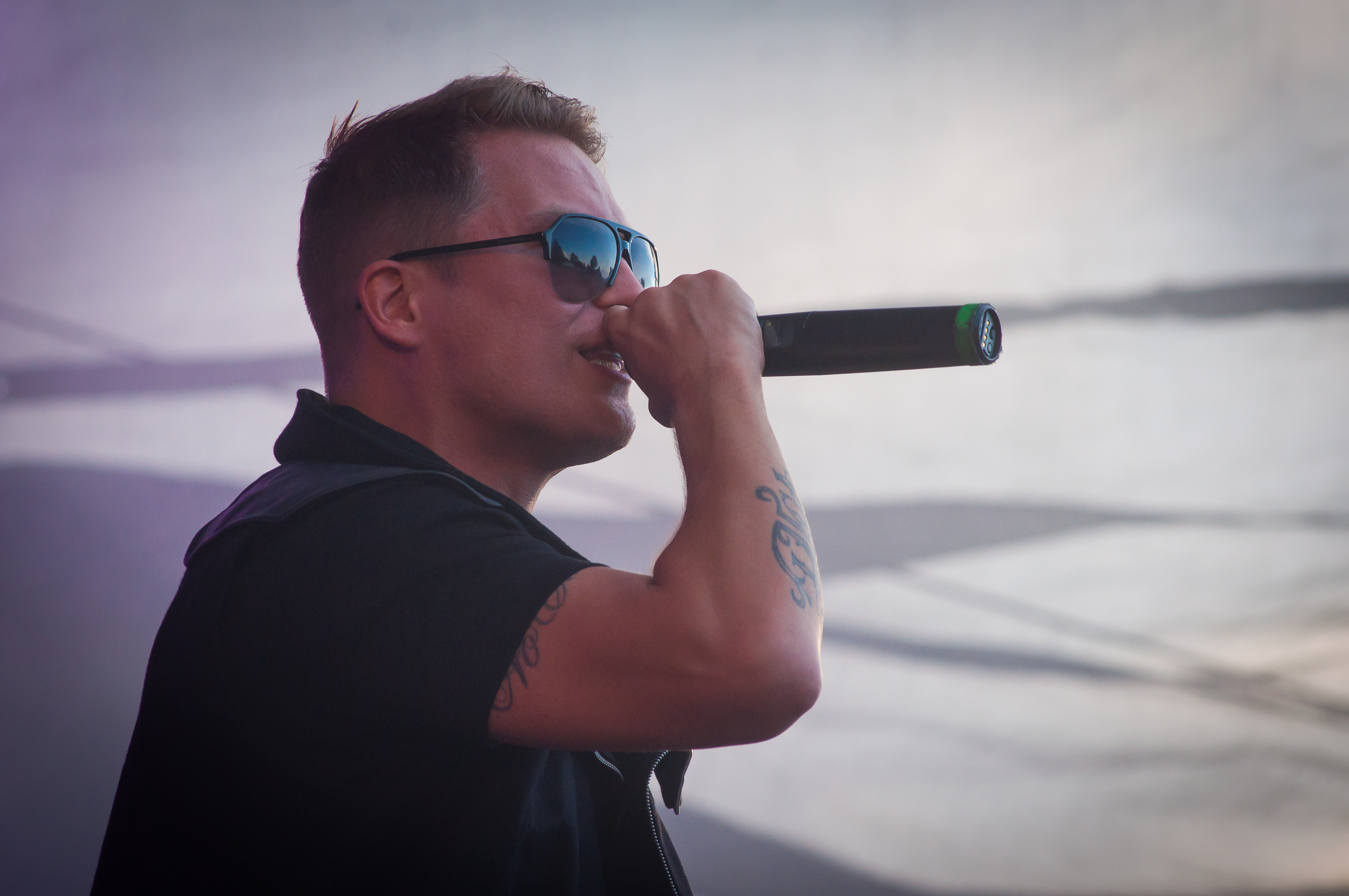
Cheek

Today rap music is one of the major genres of Finnish pop-music and there are many artists, who have reached wide popularity. Still it can be said, that rap-scene is primarily an underground-movement. But even independent artists such as ASA with often political and critical lyrics are quite popular. ASA's "leijonaa mä metsästän"-album was the third on Finnish albumchart in 2005. Finnish rap-artists, such as Paleface with English lyrics have not attained international success. An exception to this is /breakbeat-/electro-/ hiphop-band Bomfunk MC's, who with their MC Raymond Ebanks became popular in Central Europe, as they had the most sold European hit single of 2000, "Freestyler" along with trance music act Darude's international hit "Sandstorm".

In 2023 hip-hop artist Käärijä represented Finland at the Eurovision Song Contest 2023 and placed first in the televote but second in overall.

=== Pop music ===
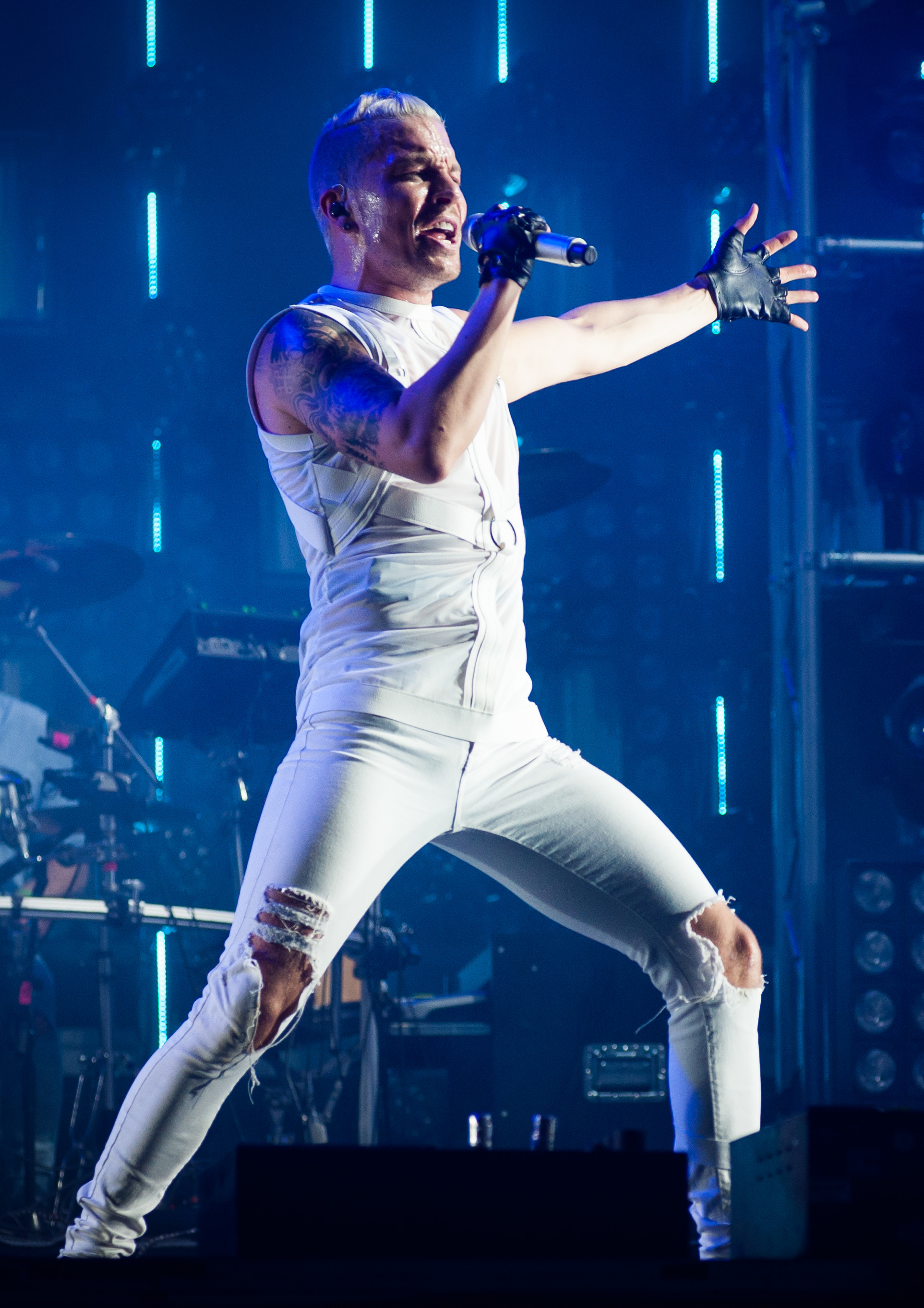
Pop singer Antti Tuisku performing at the 2016 Ilosaarirock festival in Joensuu, Finland

In the 1990s, a popular new trend was so-called Eurodance music and this style also had Finnish followers, many of which however are today quite forgotten. A couple of bands also wrote their lyrics in English, but didn't make it on the international music market. To mention few artists, there were Hausmylly, Aikakone and Movetron.

Some contemporary pop/rock singers who emerged in the 2000s, such as Maija Vilkkumaa, Sanni Kurkisuo, Jenni Vartiainen, Anssi Kela, Irina, Chisu, Anna Puu, Anna Eriksson, Hanna Pakarinen and Antti Tuisku, and pop rock groups such as Scandinavian Music Group, and PMMP, are popular in Finland. They all primarily sing in Finnish, which may contribute to their relatively low international profile. Antti Tuisku has become the most popular and best-selling artist to emerge from Idols, the Finnish version of Pop Idol. Erika Vikman is another popular electropop singer who achieved wide recognition in Finland with her 2020 hit "Syntisten pöytä" (The Sinner's Table). Poets of the Fall is an example of a Finnish pop/rock band that sings in English.

Since the late 1990s and early 2000s, female artists have become more visible as performers and songwriters. Singer-songwriter Chisu is a good example of this phenomenon penning songs that can be considered classics, along with Eppu Normaali, Tuomari Nurmio.

A number of iskelmä, rock- and pop-songs attained classic status, outlasting "hits of today". Although the differences between pop, rock and iskelmä are notable in social signification – stereotypically iskelmä is music for older and rural people, while rock and pop are for youth and urbanites–the boundaries between these genres are not always clear. This seems to be true especially in popular songs that are endlessly performed in original form, or rearranged into new musical idioms and dialects.

=== Contemporary folk music ===
The Finnish roots revival began in the 1960s. The Ilmajoki Music Festival and Kaustinen Folk Music Festival became musical centers for the country and helped revitalize traditional Finnish folk music. Runosong was revitalized by a new generation of performers, including Reijo Kela, Kimmo Pohjonen and Heikki Laitinen, who created a kalevala performance art piece.

The International Folk Music Festival, established in 1968 in Kaustinen. It became a major event in the popularization of Finnish folk. The 1970s saw further revival of Finnish folk music, including artists like Konsta Jylhä, JPP and Värttinä. Jylhä and his Purppuripelimannit band did the most to popular the scene.

Some non-Sami artists, including Enigma and Jan Garbarek, used joik and other Sami styles in their music, while Marie Boine of Norway is probably the most internationally famous Sami star. 1996's critically acclaimed Suden Aika by Tellu Turkka saw a further return of runosong.

The Finnish bagpipe, the säkkipilli, though previously extinct, was revived by folk musicians such as Petri Prauda.

In the 2000s, an underground-movement of new folk music came out. Notables include artists such as Joose Keskitalo, Kuusumun Profeetta, and Paavoharju. Despite their Finnish lyrics bands have claimed international recognition. Well-known artists J. Karjalainen and Pauli Hanhiniemi have turned to folk music.

Another new phenomenon of the 2000s is suomireggae. With Finnish lyrics and moral and spiritual content artists such as Soul-Captain Band, Kapteeni Ä-ni, Jukka Poika and Raappana have attained wider popularity.

Underground scenes of various genres are lively, while many bands and artists defy genre boundaries. A good example is underground rap artist ASA (formerly known as MC Avain), who has used folk artists as the accompanying band.

=== Electronic music ===
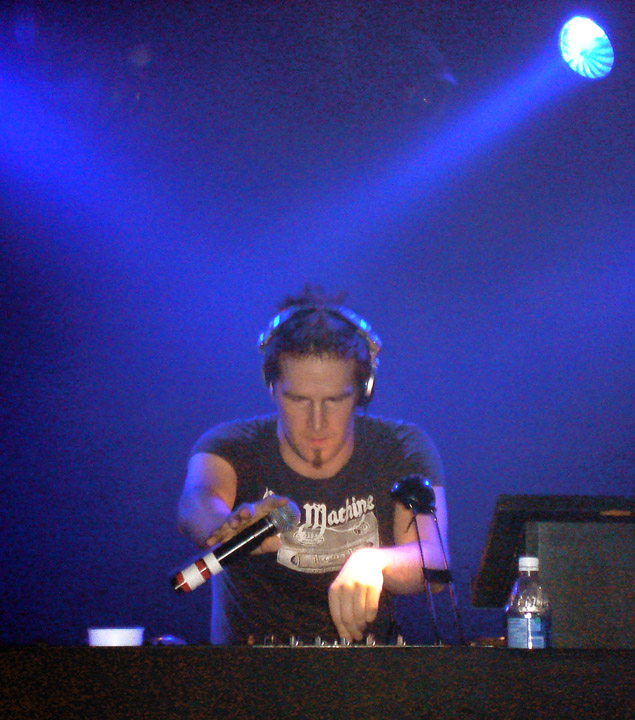
Darude in Toronto, Canada in 2007

In electronic music, Jori Hulkkonen, Jimi Tenor, and Pan Sonic have had underground success worldwide. Finland has given birth to international trance DJs such as DJ Orkidea, Alex Kunnari, DJ Proteus, JS16, Super8 & Tab, Yotto, and Paavo Siljamäki. Other notable Finnish artists are Mesak, Imatran Voima, Mr Velcro Fastener, EODEM, Luomo a.k.a. Vladislav Delay, Brothomstates, Lackluster, Pan Sonic, Op:l Bastards and Ovuca. Electronic music labels include Sähkö Recordings, Kahvi Records, Dum Records (run by Kimmo Rapatti a.k.a. Mono Junk) and Jyväskylä's Rikos Records.

The pioneer of Finnish electronic music is Erkki Kurenniemi who built DIMI synthesizers in the late 1960s and early 1970s. Finnish underground psy trance culture is mostly active in the Helsinki metro area. The Finnish style (suomisaundi) of psy trance music is known worldwide and has notable international audiences, for example in Japan and Russia. Main characters in Finnish psy trance are Mullet Mohawk, Texas Faggott and Squaremeat. The most popular Finnish electronica artist is Darude (Ville Virtanen), who gained international success with his chart-topping "Sandstorm", and the following hit album Before the Storm. His music is a combination of hard house and progressive trance. The Finnish hard dance scene gained some following, primarily due to Helsinki-based DJ Proteus winning the title of Best DJ at The Hard Dance Awards in 2004 and 2005. Finland has a popular and internationally recognised Freeform hardcore scene, with the FINRG label enjoying success in the UK, Australia, and more recently Canada and the United States.

In experimental electronica, noise and ambient electronic music, Finland is represented by Petri Kuljuntausta, Pink Twins, Ihokas, Rihmasto, Nemesis, Niko Skorpio, Dystopia, Ozone Player, Winterplanet, Corporate 09, Moya81, and Outer Space Alliance.

=== Jazz ===
Jazz came to Finland along with American immigrants in 1926. One of the first Finnish jazz bands was Dallapé which is still active Klaus Salmi, Eugen Malmstén, Erik Lindström, Toivo Kärki, Ossi Aalto and Kauko Viitamäki were some of the first professional Finnish jazz musicians. Jazz bands started doing dance gigs. Initially the popular genres were accordion jazz, ragtime, swing, jazz schlager and waltz.

Finnish jazz imitated foreign models until the 1960s when a new generation started to combine American tradition and Finnish folk influences. Artists included Esa Pethman, Heikki Sarmanto, Eero Koivistoinen and Henrik Otto Donner. Edward Vesala's and Paroni Paakkunainen's Soulset band managed to succeed in international contests and festivals. The first Finnish jazz festival, Pori Jazz, launched in 1966.

In the 1970s, musicians began to mix jazz, funk and progressive rock. Pekka Pöyry, Sakari Kukko, Pekka Pohjola, Jukka Tolonen and Olli Ahvenlahti were some of the best-known Finnish jazz musicians. Sakari Kukko's Piirpauke played jazz that was influenced by Finnish folk music and progressive rock. The music of Wigwam and Tasavallan Presidentti is usually regarded as progressive rock, but included elements of jazz fusion. Live concerts often included long solos. The UMO Jazz Orchestra was founded in 1975 and gave opportunity to many Finnish jazz musicians to earn a living.

In the 1980s and 1990s, Finnish jazz became more internationally recognized. Jukka Linkola, Jukka Perko and Tapani Rinne with his Rinneradio combined various musical styles. Iiro Rantala, Raalmi Eskelinen and Eerik Siikasaari founded Trio Töykeät in 1988 and the band attained worldwide interest. Other important jazz musicians from this era are Severi Pyysalo, Lenni-Kalle Taipale, Verneri Pohjola, Markus Ketola and Anna-Mari Kähärä. Martti "Mape" Lappalainen founded Espoo Big Band and April Jazz festival in the 1980s.

After the 1990s, Finnish jazz evolved in different directions. Samplers were used to create more unique sounds. The Five Corners Quintet, U-Street All Stars and Quintessence played nu-jazz with electronic and pop influences. Oddarrang, Dalindéo, Mopo, Teemu Viinikainen, Timo Lassy, Jukka Eskola, Manuel Dunkel and Mikko Innanen represent the future of Finnish jazz.

=== Military music ===
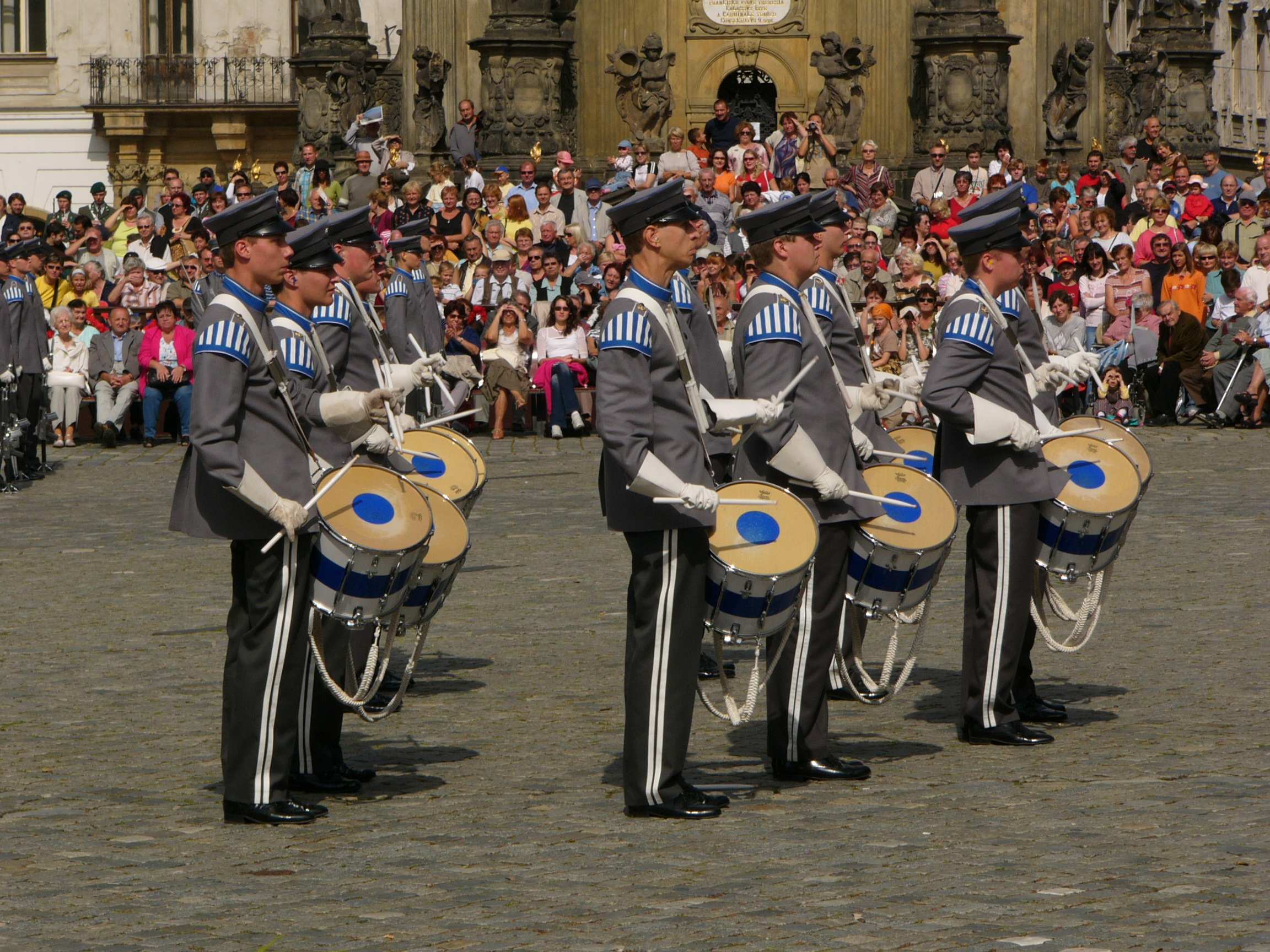
The Conscript Band of the Finnish Defense Forces—drums

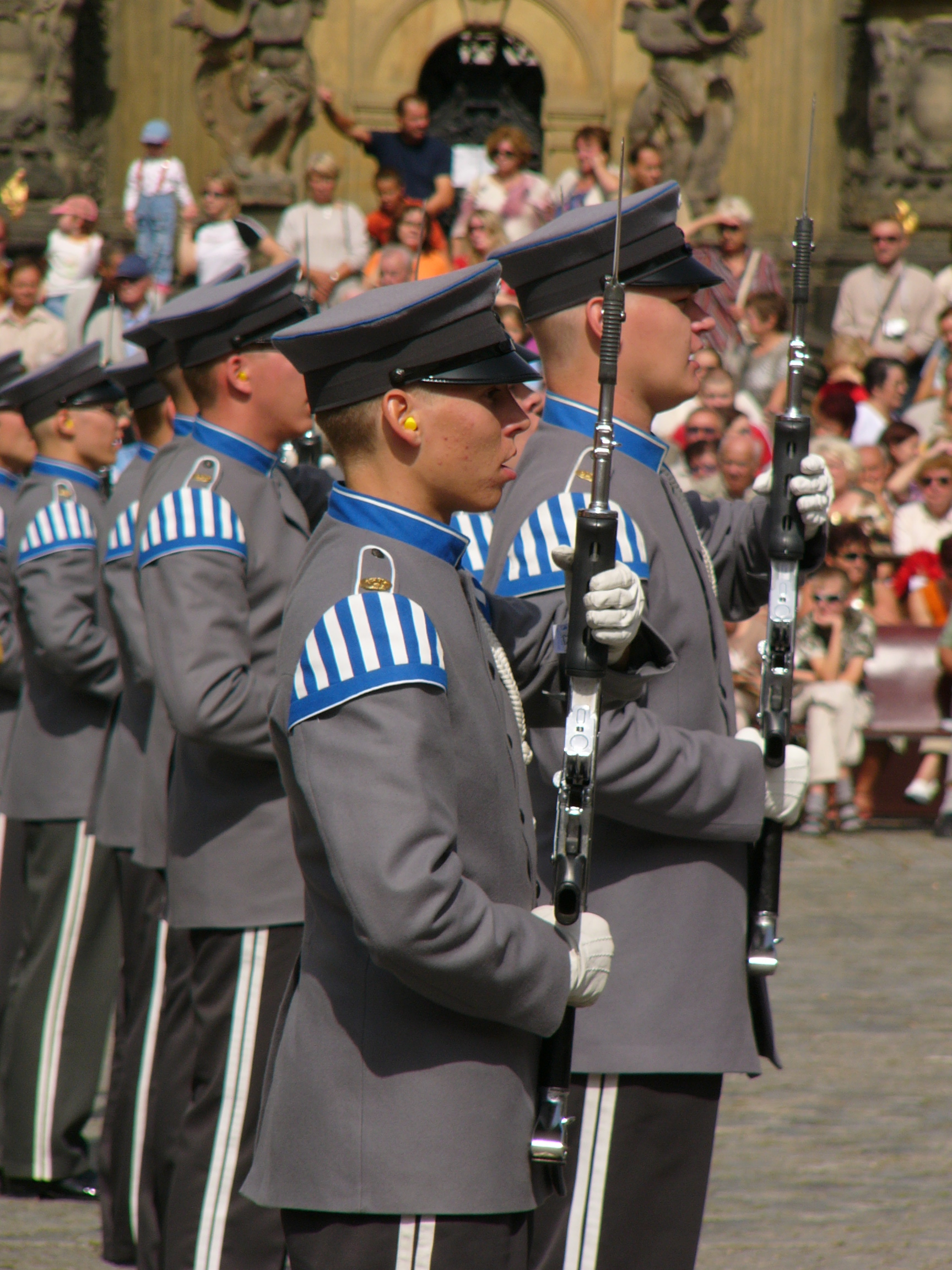
The Conscript Band of the Finnish Defense Forces—singing

Military bands are a part of the Finnish Defence Forces. A total of thirteen military bands operate in Finland. They are relatively small in size, but are often reinforced with other local professional wind players.

- Kaartin Soittokunta (The Guards' Band), Helsinki. 40 musicians + 2 conductors.
- Panssarisoittokunta (The Armour Band), Hämeenlinna. 20 mus. + 1 cond.
- Laivaston Soittokunta (The Navy Band), Turku. 20 mus. + 1 cond.
- Ilmavoimien Soittokunta (The Air Force Band), Jyväskylä. 20 mus. + 1 cond.
- Savon Sotilassoittokunta (The Band of Savo), Mikkeli. 20 mus. + 1 cond.
- Oulun Sotilassoittokunta (The Military Band of Oulu), Oulu. 20 mus. + 1 cond.
- Rakuunasoittokunta (The Dragoons Band), Lappeenranta. 14 mus. + 1 cond.
- Pohjanmaan Sotilassoittokunta (The Osthrobothnian Military Band), Vaasa. 14 mus. + 1 cond.
- Satakunnan Sotilassoittokunta (The Satakunta Military Band); Niinisalo. 14 mus. + 1 cond.
- Karjalan Sotilassoittokunta (The Karelian Military Band); Kontioranta. 14 mus. + 1 cond.
- Kainuun Sotilassoittokunta (The Kainuu Military Band); Kajaani. 14 mus. + 1 cond.
- Lapin Sotilassoittokunta (The Military Band of Lapland); Rovaniemi. 14 mus. + 1 cond.

A large military band consisting only of conscripts with professional conductors is called The Conscript Band of the Finnish Defence Forces. Its strength is about 60–70 musicians. It operates in Lahti and is concentrated on making marching shows and large-scale concerts.

== Further listening ==
A 3-CD box set entitled Beginner's Guide to Scandinavia was released by Nascente/Demon Music Group in May 2011. It was the first time that the various genres of Scandinavian music – pop, folk, jazz and experimental – had been combined in one release. Finnish artists included Värttinä, Kimmo Pohjonen, Maria Kalaniemi, Vuokko Hovatta, Sanna Kurki-Suonio, Islaja and Wimme.

== Radio stations ==
- Yle, The Finnish state broadcasting corporation
  - Yle Radio 1
  - Yle Radio Suomi
  - YleX
  - Yle X3M
  - Yle Vega
- Commercial
  - NRJ Group
  - Loop
  - Radio Rock
  - Radio Aalto
  - Radio Nova
  - Groove FM
  - Radio Suomipop
  - Radio Helsinki
  - The Voice

== See also ==
- List of Finnish singers
- List of Finnish musicians
- List of Finnish jazz musicians
- List of best-selling music artists in Finland
- List of years in Finnish music
- Culture of Finland
- Scandinavian death metal
- Sami music
- Provinssirock
- Pori Jazz Festival
- April Jazz Festival

== Other sources ==
- Henriksson, Juha. "Suomalaisen jazzin vuosisata" Viitattu 27 May 2014.
- Henriksson, Juha. "A short history of Finnish jazz" Viitattu 27 May 2014.
- Cronshaw, Andrew. "New Runes". 2000. In Broughton, Simon and Ellingham, Mark with McConnachie, James and Duane, Orla (Ed.), World Music, Vol. 1: Africa, Europe and the Middle East, pp 91–102. Rough Guides Ltd, Penguin Books. ISBN 1-85828-636-0
