= List of years in Finnish music =

This page indexes the individual year in Finnish music pages. Each year is annotated with a significant event as a reference point.

2010s - pre-2010s

== 2010s ==
- 2019 in Finnish music
- 2018 in Finnish music
- 2017 in Finnish music
- 2016 in Finnish music
- 2015 in Finnish music
- 2014 in Finnish music
- 2013 in Finnish music
- 2012 in Finnish music
- 2011 in Finnish music
- 2010 in Finnish music

== Pre-2010s ==
- 2009 in Finnish music
- 2008 in Finnish music
- 2007 in Finnish music
- 2006 in Finnish music
- 2005 in Finnish music
- 2004 in Finnish music
- 2003 in Finnish music
- 2002 in Finnish music
- 2001 in Finnish music
- 2000 in Finnish music
