= 2019 in Finnish music =

The following is a list of notable events and releases of the year 2019 in Finnish music.

== Events ==
=== January ===
- 11 – The 23rd Folklandia Cruise started in Helsinki (January 11 – 12).

=== February ===
- 10 – The Kokkola Winter Accordion Festival started (February 10 – 17).

=== March ===
- 6 – The 50th Turku Jazz Festival started in Turku (March 6 – 10).

=== April ===
- 11 – The Tampere Biennale started (April 11 – 15).
- 14 – The Hetta Music Event started in Enontekiö (April 14–21).
- 24 – The 32nd April Jazz Espoo started (April 25 – 29).

=== May ===
- 16 – The Vaasa Choir Festival started (May 16 – 19).

=== July ===
- 5 – The Baltic Jazz festival started in Dalsbruk (July 5 – 7).
- 8 – The 52nd Kaustinen Folk Music Festival started (July 8 – 14).
- 12 – The 54th Pori Jazz Festival started in Pori, Finland (July 12 – 20).

=== August ===
- 7 – The Rauma Festivo Music Festival started (August 7–11).

=== September ===
- 5 – The 20th Lahti Sibelius Festival started (September 5–8).

== Deaths ==
=== February ===
- 12 – Olli Lindholm, rock singer and guitarist, Yö and Appendix (born 1964).

== See also ==
- 2019 in Finland
- Music of Finland
- Finland in the Eurovision Song Contest 2019
