= 2017 in Finnish music =

The following is a list of notable events and releases of the year 2017 in Finnish music.

== Events ==
=== January ===
- 18 – Esa-Pekka Salonen announced that he has withdrawn as music director of the Ojai Music Festival for 2018 because of his composition schedule, and will be replaced by Patricia Kopatchinskaja, ahead of her originally scheduled season in 2020.
- 28 – At the annual Uuden Musiikin Kilpailu, Norma John was selected to represent Finland in the Eurovision Song Contest.

=== February ===
- 2 – The Music Nova Helsinki started (February 2 – 12).

=== March ===
- 9 – Esa-Pekka Salonen's Cello Concerto is premièred by Yo-Yo Ma and the Chicago Symphony Orchestra.

=== April ===
- 26 – The 31st April Jazz Espoo start (April 26 – 30).

=== May ===
- 9 – The soprano Karita Mattila wins the Singer's award at the Royal Philharmonic Society (RPS) Music Awards 2017.
- 18 - Gita Kadambi is appointed general director of the Finnish National Opera and Ballet announces the appointment of as its next general director, effective January 2018. Kadambi will stand down from her post as general manager of the Helsinki Philharmonic Orchestra.

=== June ===
- 14 – The band HIM open their Farewell Tour in Barcelona.
- 30 – The 20th Tuska Festival started (June 30 – July 2).

=== July ===
- 7
  - The Baltic Jazz festival started in Dalsbruk (July 7 – 9).
  - The Ruisrock festival started at the Ruissalo island, Åbo (July 7 – 9).
- 8 – The 52nd Pori Jazz Festival started in Pori (July 8 – 16).
- 10 – The 50th Kaustinen Folk Music Festival started (July 10 – 16).

=== August ===
- 1 – Finnish-born Tuomas Hiltunen took over as general director of Fort Worth Opera.
- 8 – The Rauma Festivo Music Festival started (August 8–12).
- 17 – The Turku Jazz Festival started in Åbo (August 17 – 20).

=== September ===
- 11 – Our Festival (Meidän Festivaali in Finnish) started by the Lake Tuusula (September 11–17).

=== October ===
- 22 – The band Brother Firetribe appeared at the Rockingham Festival in the UK.

=== November ===
- 1 – Susanna Mälkki awarded the music prize by Nordisk Råd.
- 2 – The Tampere Jazz Happening start (November 2–5).

== Album released ==
=== February ===
Day	Album	Artist	Label	Notes	Ref.
24	Helluva	Trollfest	Napalm Records		

=== March ===
Day	Album	Artist	Label	Notes	Ref.
10	Hulluuden Highway	Haloo Helsinki!	Sony Music		

=== April ===
Day	Album	Artist	Label	Notes	Ref.
28	Fanatiko	Barathrum	Saturnal Records		

=== June ===
Day	Album	Artist	Label	Notes	Ref.
23	Helsinki Vampire	Jyrki 69	Poko Rekords		

=== August ===
Day	Album	Artist	Label	Notes	Ref.
25	Live at Masters of Rock	Korpiklaani	Nuclear Blast	Live album	

=== October ===
Day	Album	Artist	Label	Notes	Ref.
27	Good Stuff	Iiro Rantala & Ulf Wakenius	ACT	Produced by Siggi Loch	

== Deaths ==
March

- 9 - Barbara Helsingius, 79, Finnish singer, poet and Olympic fencer

April

- 12 - Mika Vainio, 53, Finnish electronic and experimental musician (Pan Sonic)

May

- 1 - Erkki Kurenniemi, 75, Finnish musician

October

- 22 - Emu Lehtinen, 70, Finnish record dealer (leukemia)

November

- 7 - Pentti Glan, 71, Finnish-Canadian drummer (Alice Cooper, Lou Reed)

== See also ==
- Music of Finland
- Finland in the Eurovision Song Contest 2017
