= 2018 in Finnish music =

The following is a list of notable events and releases of the year 2018 in Finnish music.

== Events ==
=== January ===
- 12 – The 22nd Folklandia Cruise start in Helsinki (January 12 – 13).
- 13 – Composer Paavo Heininen, considered by many to be Finland's most influential musician, celebrates his 80th birthday with a concert at the Järvenpää Hall, Helsinki.

=== February ===
- 11 – The Kokkola Winter Accordion Festival start (February 11 – 18).

=== March ===
- 8 – The Turku Jazz Festival start in Turku (March 8 – 11).
- 12 – The Finnish Radio Symphony Orchestra, under Hannu Lintu, begins a week-long series of concerts in Germany.
- 27 – The Hetta Music Event start in Enontekiö (March 27 - April 1).

=== April ===
- 11 – The Tampere Biennale start (April 11 – 15).
- 25 – The 32nd April Jazz Espoo start (April 25 – 29).

=== May ===
- 9 – The Vaasa Choir Festival start (May 9 – 13).

=== June ===
- 3 – The VocalEspoo Festival start (June 3 – 9).

=== July ===
- 6 – The Baltic Jazz festival start in Dalsbruk (July 6 – 8).
- 9 – The 51st Kaustinen Folk Music Festival start (July 9 – 15).
- 14 – The 53rd Pori Jazz Festival start in Pori, Finland (July 14 – 22).

=== August ===
- 7 – The Rauma Festivo Music Festival start (August 7–11).

=== September ===
- 6 – The Lahti Sibelius Festival start (September 6–9).

== See also ==
- 2018 in Finland
- Music of Finland
- Finland in the Eurovision Song Contest 2018
