= 2016 in Finnish music =

The following is a list of notable events and releases of the year 2016 in Finnish music.

== Events ==
=== February ===
- 6 – The Uuden Musiikin Kilpailu 2016 Semi-finals was initiated February 6. The next two semi-finals is executed February 13 and 20.
- 10 – The Ojai Music Festival announced the appointment of Esa-Pekka Salonen as its music director for the 2018 season.
- 27 – The Uuden Musiikin Kilpailu 2016 Final will take place on February 27.

=== April ===
- 13 – The Tampere Biennale started (April 13 – 17).
- 22 – The singer-songwriter Suvi Åkerman, mentored by Tarja Turunen, won the final of season 5 of The Voice of Finland.

=== July ===
- 8 - The Baltic Jazz festival started in Dalsbruk (July 8 – 10).

=== November ===
- 3 - Tampere Jazz Happening is opened (November 3–6).

== Album releases ==
=== January ===
Day	Album	Artist	Label	Notes	Ref.
29	Ghostlights	Avantasia	Nuclear Blast		
29	High Noon	Kalle Kalima	ACT		

=== February ===
Day	Album	Artist	Label	Notes	Ref.
12	Olavi	Olavi Uusivirta	(Johanna Kustannus)		

=== June ===
Day	Album	Artist	Label	Notes	Ref.
3	The Brightest Void	Tarja Turunen	Ear Music		

== Deaths ==
February

- 4 – Ulf Söderblom (86), Finnish conductor

May

- 9 – Riki Sorsa (63), Finnish singer ("Reggae OK") (cancer)
- 14 – Lasse Mårtenson (81), Finnish singer, composer, actor, and theater conductor

July

- 27 – Einojuhani Rautavaara, Finnish composer, 87

== See also ==
- Music of Finland
- Finland in the Eurovision Song Contest 2016
