= Juho Ylikorpi =

Finnish farmer and politician (1864–1937)

Juho (Juhani, Jussi) Matinpoika Ylikorpi (4 April 1864 – 25 December 1937; surname until 1891 Känsäkoski) was a Finnish farmer and politician, born in Kaustinen. He was a member of the Parliament of Finland from 1907 to 1908, representing the Finnish Party.
