= Rakkopilli =

Type of bagpipe with no drone

The rakkopilli is a type of bagpipe with no drone, made of a pig's bladder. It was first introduced to Estonia by Germans in the 13th century and from there spread to southern Finland and Finnic peoples such as Votians, Izhorians and Ingrian Finns.

== See also ==
- Torupill
- Säkkipilli
