= Konsta Jylhä =

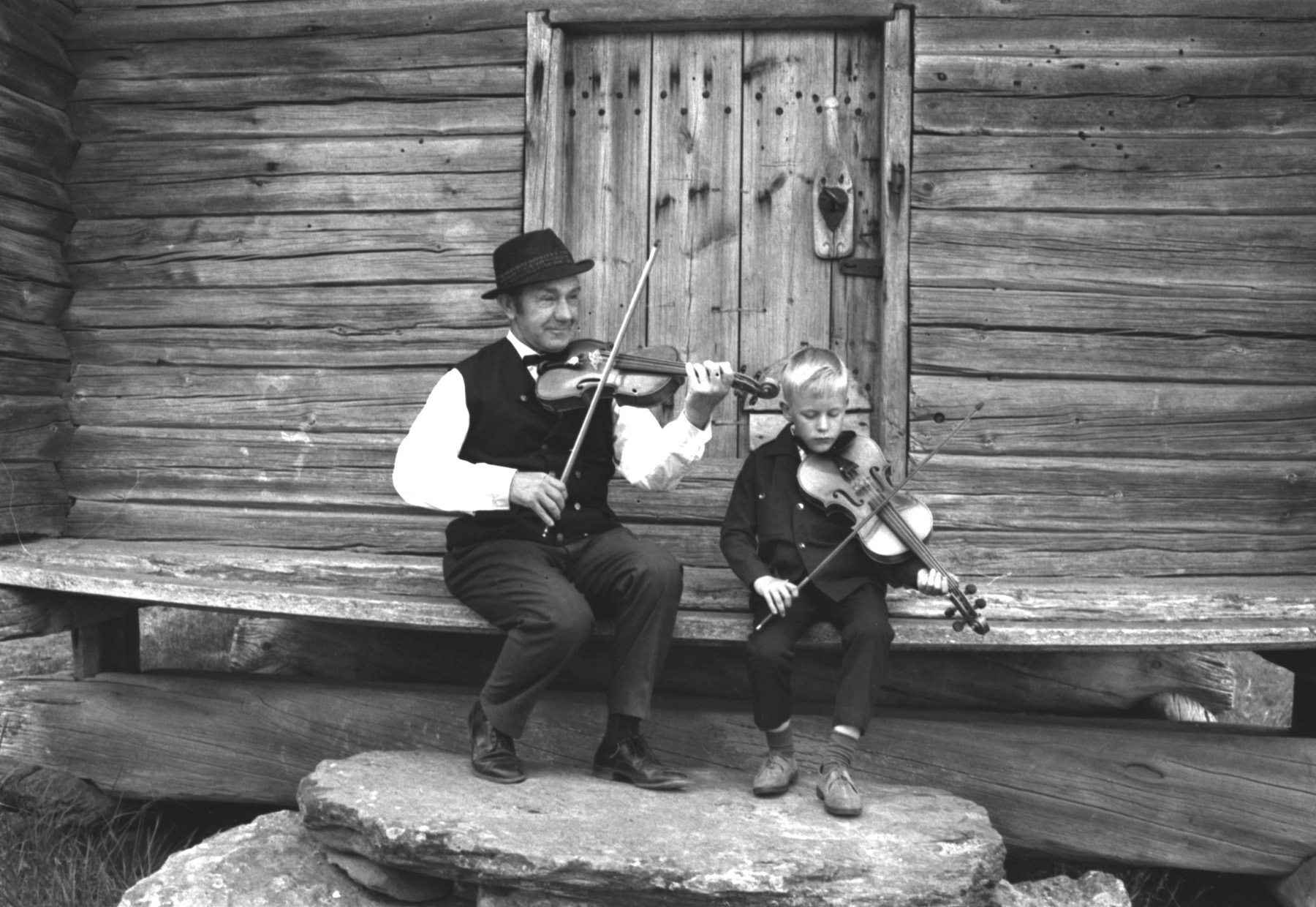
Konsta Jylhä in 1975.

Konsta Viljami Jylhä (14 August 1910 – 13 September 1984) was a folk-virtuoso who, in Finnish fiddling, made the traditional pelimanni-style folk music a Finnish cultural phenomenon of wider currency, bringing his natural genius and traditional style to a burgeoning nationwide television audience, thus laying the foundation for a rich and popular traditional music scene in Finland.

He was born in Kaustinen, a third generation Central Ostrobothnian master pelimanni (Mestaripelimanni). In the 1960s Jylhä's band Konsta Jylhä ja Purppuripelimannit became a mainstay of the Kaustinen Folk Music Festival, and iconic both in popular culture, and within the generation of master pelimanni to follow in his footsteps.

His best known pieces of original composition are Konstan Parempi Valssi ("Konsta's Major Waltz") and especially the hauntingly beautiful Vaiennut Viulu ("Mute Violin").

After being receiving a severe head injury in a logging accident in 1961 and several heart attacks after 1962, he became a born-again Christian. During his later years he composed spiritual songs. He died in Kokkola.
