= Dallapé =

Finnish music group

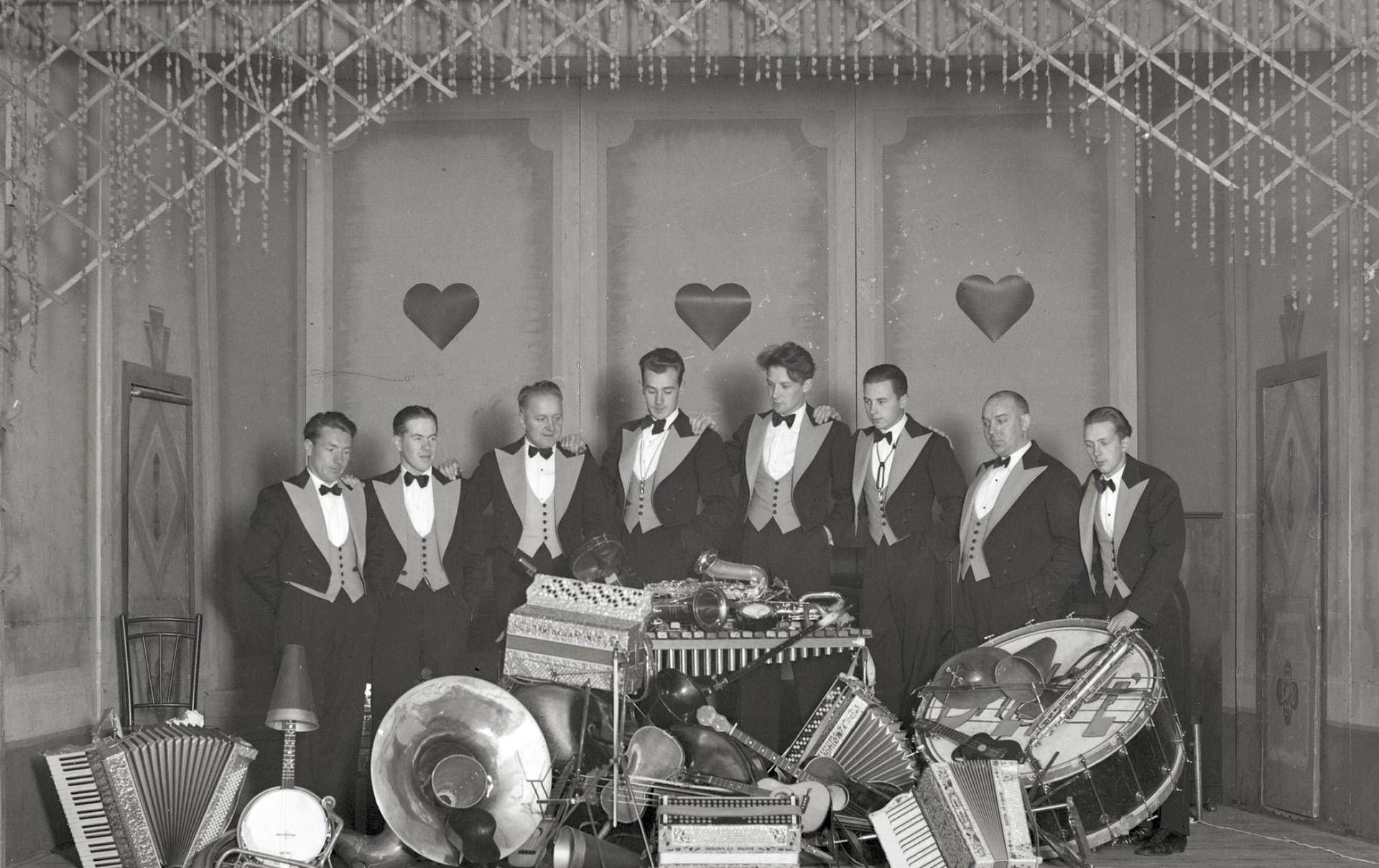
- Dallapé at Toverien Kerho, Lönnrotinkatu 32, Helsinki in 1932. From the left: Martti Jäppilä, Helge Pahlman, Matti Jurva, Pauli Impivaara, Eino Katajavuori, Paavo Raivonen, Erkki Majander, and Eero Lauresalo.

Background information
- Origin: Helsinki, Finland
- Genres: Jazz, schlager
- Years active: 1925–1955, 1960–present
- Labels: Sony Music Entertainment (2013–)
- Website: dallape.fi

Dallapé is a Finnish music group established in 1925 by accordionist Masa Jäppilä (1900–1967), singer Ville Alanko (1907–1931), and percussionist Mauno Jonsson, who were influenced by American jazz music. Dallapé was the most popular band in Finland in the 1930s and played a significant role in the history of Finnish music for decades. The band is still active. The name refers to the Dallapé family of accordion builders in Stradella, PV, Italy.

== Members ==
=== Current ===
- Juha Hostikka – vocals
- Anssi Nykänen – drums
- Harri Rantanen – bass
- Varre Vartiainen – guitar
- Niko Kumpuvaara – accordion
- Mauri Saarikoski – violin
- Arttu Takalo – xylophone
- Petri Puolitaival – saxophone
- Heikki Pohto – saxophone
- Tero Lindberg – trumpet
- Antti Rissanen – trombone, tuba

=== Selected past members ===
- Asser Fagerström
- Kauko Käyhkö
- Rauno Lehtinen
- Georg Malmstén
- Tauno Palo
- Tapio Rautavaara
- Sami Saari
- Tapani Valsta
- Viljo Vesterinen
- Olavi Virta

== Discography ==
=== Albums ===
- Dallapé-orkesteri (with Kalevi Korpi and Johnny Forsell; PSO, 1971)
- Konkaritanssit 2 (with Kalevi Korpi, Martti Suuntala, and Dallapé; PSO, 1972)
- Konkaritanssit 5 (with Kalevi Korpi, Johnny Forsell, Berit and Dallapé; PSO, 1974)
- Dallapé 50 (PSO, 1975)
- Dallapé-orkesteri (with Viljo Lehtinen; PSO)
- Dallapé-orkesteri (with various artists; double LP; Finnlevy, 1982)
- Suomen Joutsen (1989)
- Tuplajättipotti (1995)
- Juhlalevy (Poptori, 2000)
- 20 suosikkia – Levytyksiä vuosilta 1930–1940 (Warner Music Finland, 2000)
- Levytyksiä vuodelta 1929 (Artie Music, 2006)
- Levytyksiä vuosilta 1930–1933 (Artie Music, 2006)
- Ja vuodet vierivät... (with Kosti Seppälä and Dallapé; Poptori, 2007)
- Levytyksiä vuosilta 1934–1936 (Artie Music, 2007)
- Levytyksiä vuosilta 1937–1938 (Artie Music, 2008)
- Levytyksiä vuodelta 1939 (Artie Music, 2009)
- Jälleen soittaa Dallapé (Blue Note, 2010)
- Levytyksiä vuosilta 1940–1942 (Artie Music, 2011)
- Soittajan sussu (Blue Note, 2011)
- Tähtisarja – 30 suosikkia (Warner Music, 2012)
