= Timo Lassy =

Finnish saxophonist, composer and bandleader (born 1974)

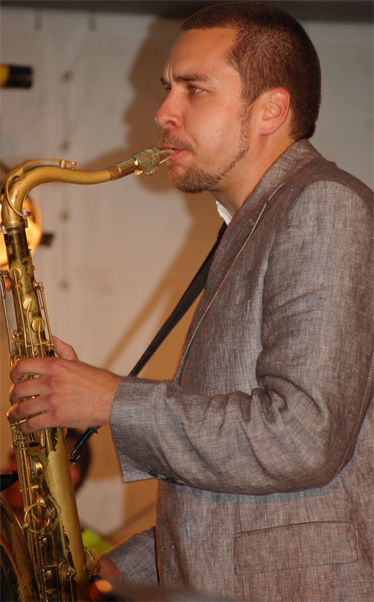
- Lassy in 2017

Background information
- Born: 8 December 1974 (age 50); Helsinki, Finland
- Genres: Jazz, soul jazz, latin jazz
- Occupation(s): Musician, composer, bandleader
- Instrument(s): tenor saxophone, flute
- Years active: 1990s–present
- Labels: Membran, Schema, We Jazz, Ricky-Tick Records
- Website: timolassy.com

Timo Lassy (born 1974) is a Finnish saxophonist, composer and bandleader. He is best known for Timo Lassy Band, with whom he has recorded 6 albums together. Prior to his solo career he was a member of U-Street All Stars and The Five Corners Quintet.

Timo Lassy has had three albums on the Finnish National album chart by Ipfi.fi: in with Lassy in 2012, Love Bullet in 2015 and Moves in 2018 all of which have also received nominations for Jazz album of the Year at the Emma Gaala. The album Moves reached #6 on the Physical album chart on week 18/2018. "Moves" won the Emma award for Jazz Album of the Year.

Timo Lassy Band recorded a feature concert YLE Live: M1-Studiossa Timo Lassy Band which was broadcast nationally on 5 May 2013 and is available worldwide at Yle Areena. On 3 February 2018 WDR 3 broadcast a live television and radio concert by Timo Lassy from Theater Gütersloh.

== Discography (selected) ==
Solo albums

- The Soul & Jazz of Timo Lassy (Ricky-Tick Records [In Japan Columbia Records], 20 June 2007)
- Round Two (Ricky-Tick Records, 2009)
- In with Lassy (Schema Records, 2012)
- Live with Lassy (Schema Records, 2013)
- Love Bullet (Membran, 2015)
- Moves (Membran, 2018)

Singles

- African Rumble / High at Noon (Ricky-Tick Records, 2006), 12-inch single
- The Call / Sweet Spot (Ricky-Tick Records, 2007), 12-inch single
- "The More I Look at You" (featuring José James) / "Ya Dig" (instrumental) (Ricky-Tick Records, 2009) 7-inch single
- "Teddy the Sweeper" / "Where's the Man?" (Schema Records, 2012) 7-inch single

Other

- Calling James/Yanki – Timo Lassy & Teppo Mäkynen Duo (We Jazz, 2017), 7 inch single
- When the Devils Paid – Timo Lassy featuring Ed Motta (Membran, 2017), EP
