= Susanna Mälkki =

Finnish conductor and cellist

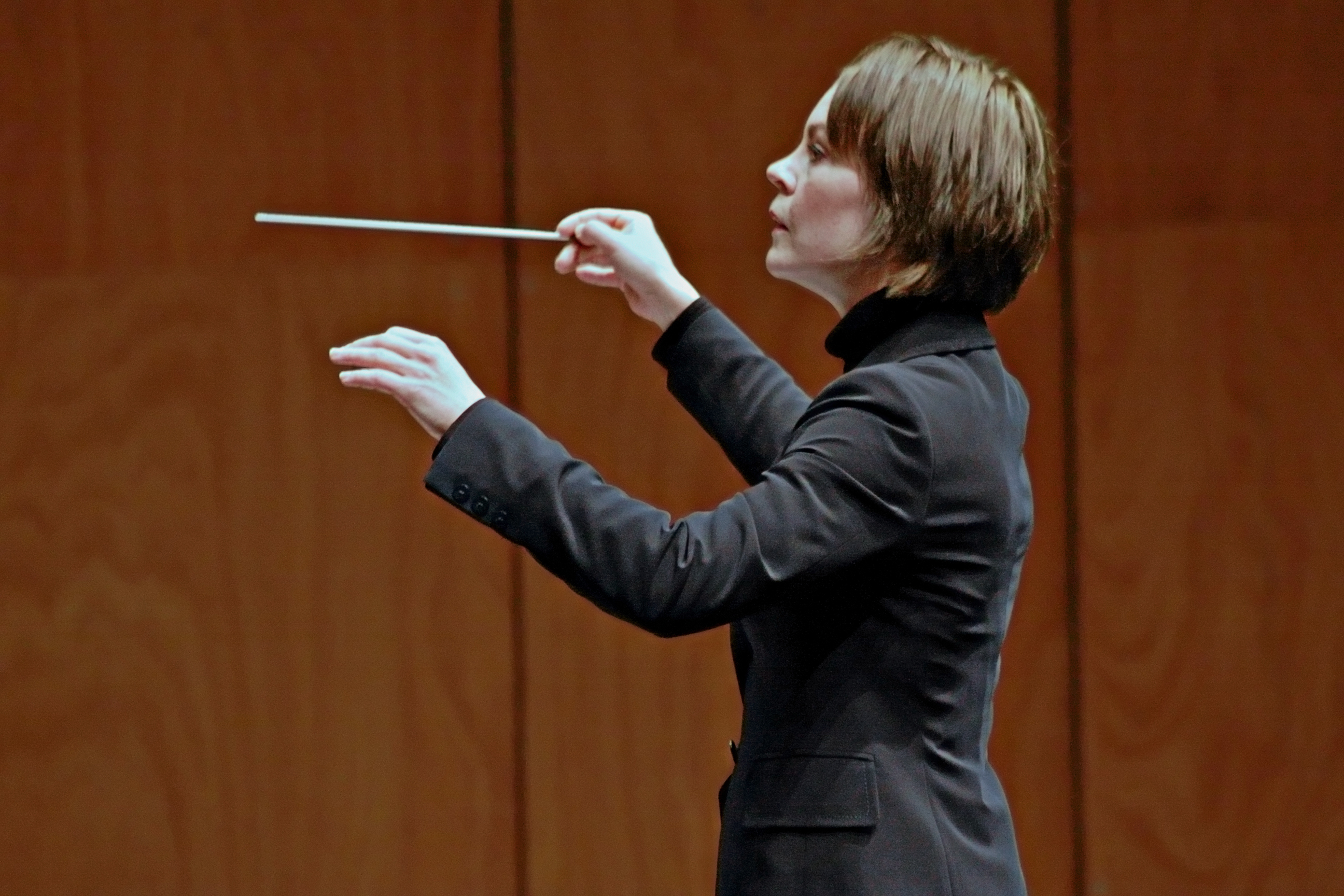

Background information
- Born: Susanna Ulla Marjukka Mälkki; 13 March 1969 (age 57); Helsinki, Finland
- Occupations: Conductor; cellist

Susanna Ulla Marjukka Mälkki (born 13 March 1969) is a Finnish conductor and cellist.

== Early life and education ==
Mälkki was born on 13 March 1969 in Helsinki. She began to learn the violin, piano, and cello in her youth, eventually focusing her studies on the cello. She continued her cello studies with Hannu Kiiski, and later studied conducting with Jorma Panula, Eri Klas, and Leif Segerstam at the Sibelius Academy. She also studied at London's Royal Academy of Music. She participated in a Sibelius Academy Conductor's Workshop at Carnegie Hall in 1998, under the supervision of Panula and Esa-Pekka Salonen.

== Career ==
In 1994, Mälkki won the 1st prize in the Turku National Cello Competition. From 1995 to 1998, she was principal cellist in the Gothenburg Symphony Orchestra. She left her Gothenburg position to devote herself to conducting. From 2002 to 2005, she was artistic leader of the Stavanger Symphony Orchestra.

Her debut with the Ensemble InterContemporain (EIC) was in August 2004, in a program of Harrison Birtwistle at the Lucerne Festival. She became the EIC's music director in 2006, the first woman to hold the post, and served as the EIC's music director until 2013. She continues to maintain a residence in Paris.

Mälkki is known as a specialist in contemporary music. Her work in contemporary music includes several world premieres and opera productions, such as conducting the Finnish premiere of Thomas Adès' Powder Her Face in 1999, which led to Adès inviting Mälkki to be his assistant for further performances of this opera at the Almeida Theatre in London, where, as she noted, "I ended up conducting some of the performances." Her conducting debut at the BBC Proms was in July 2007, leading the London Sinfonietta. She conducted the world premiere of Luca Francesconi's opera Quartett at La Scala in Milan in 2011, becoming the first woman ever to conduct an opera production in the history of the house.

Outside of Europe, Mälkki made her New Zealand conducting debut in November 2006 with the New Zealand Symphony Orchestra. Her North American conducting debut was in February 2007 with the Saint Louis Symphony Orchestra. She first guest-conducted the Los Angeles Philharmonic in 2010. In April 2016, the orchestra announced her appointment as its next principal guest conductor, effective with the 2017–2018 season, with an initial contract of 3 years. Mälkki is the first female conductor to be named to the principal guest conductorship of the Los Angeles Philharmonic. In December 2016, Mälkki made her Metropolitan Opera conducting debut in the company's first-ever production of L'Amour de loin of Kaija Saariaho, the fourth female conductor to lead a production at the Metropolitan Opera, and the first female conductor to be featured in the Metropolitan Opera Live in HD series. She stood down from the Los Angeles Philharmonic post in 2021.

In May 2013, Mälkki was appointed Principal Guest Conductor of the Gulbenkian Orchestra, with an initial contract of 3 years, effective July 2013. In September 2014, she was named the next chief conductor of the Helsinki Philharmonic Orchestra, effective autumn 2016, with an initial contract of 3 years. She is the first female conductor to be named to this post. In October 2017, the Helsinki Philharmonic announced the extension of her contract as chief conductor through 2021. In June 2019, the orchestra announced a further extension of her contract as chief conductor through 2023, with an option for a further 2-year extension past 2023. Mälkki concluded her tenure with the orchestra at the end of the 2022–2023 season, and now has the title of chief conductor emeritus with the orchestra. In March 2025, the Sibelius Academy announced the appointment of Mälkki as its next professor of orchestral conducting, the first female conductor to be named to the post, effective 1 August 2025.

Mälkki recorded two works of Stuart MacRae for the NMC label, Two Scenes from the Death of Count Ugolino and Motus. With the EIC, she has conducted recordings of music by Bruno Mantovani, Luca Francesconi, Philippe Manoury, Michael Jarrell, Pierre Jodlowski, and Yann Robin, all for the Kairos label.

== Honors ==
- 2017: Nordic Council Music Prize
- Forbes – 50 Over 50: EMEA 2022

Cultural offices
Preceded by Ole Kristian Ruud	Music Director, Stavanger Symphony Orchestra; 2002–2005	Succeeded by Steven Sloane
Preceded by John Storgårds	Chief Conductor, Helsinki Philharmonic Orchestra; 2016–2023	Succeeded by Jukka-Pekka Saraste
