= April Jazz =

Finnish annual jazz music festival

April Jazz is an annual jazz music festival held in Tapiola, Espoo, Finland at the end of April. It has been held annually since 1987.

In 2020 it was organized as a live streaming event through keikalla.fi service as a result of the COVID-19 pandemic.
