= Kaustinen =

Kaustinen Kaustby
- Municipality
- Kaustisen kunta Kaustby kommun
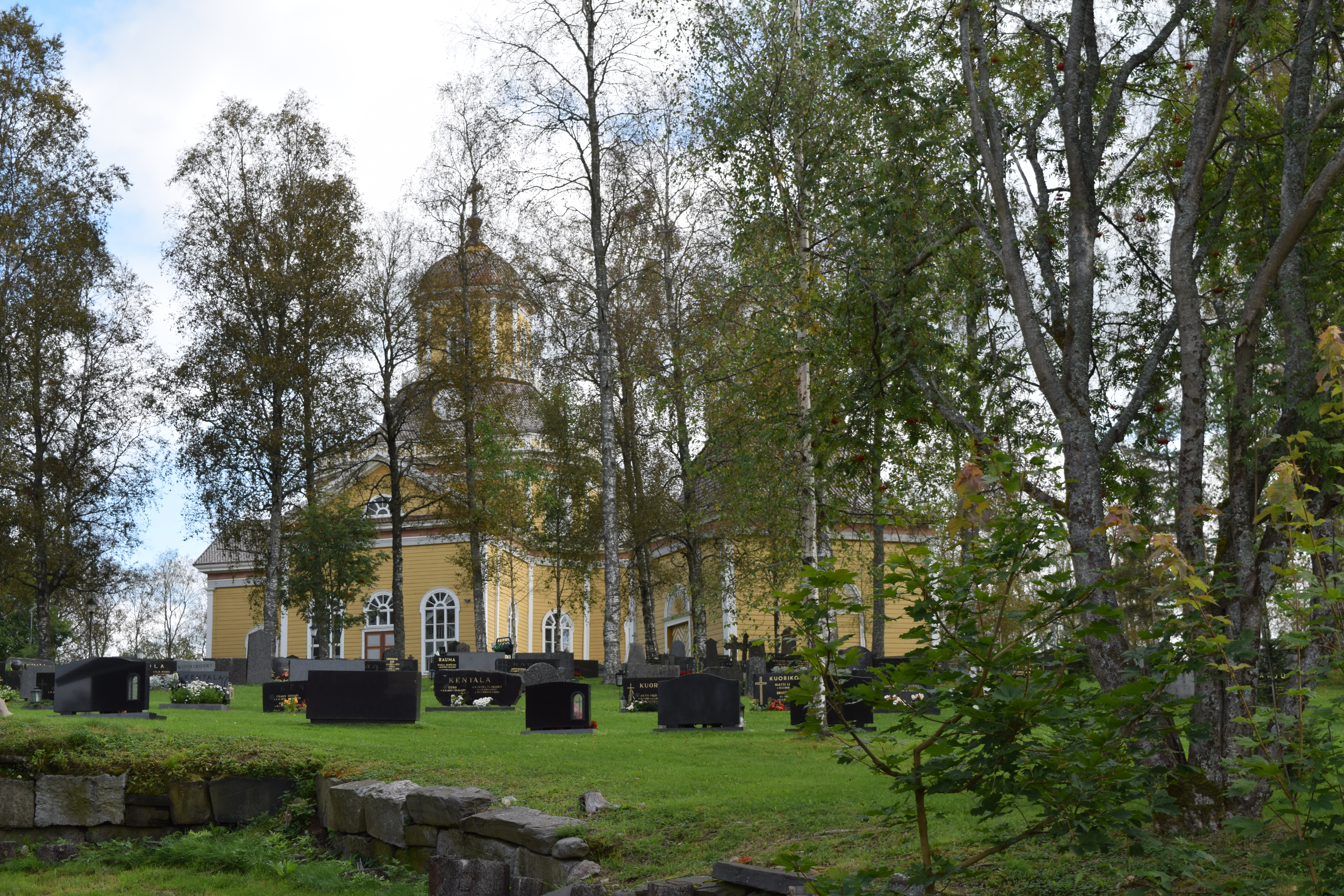
- The Church in Kaustinen on the sloping churchhill.

- Coat of arms
- Nickname: The Fiddling Capital of Finland
- Location of Kaustinen in Finland
- Interactive map of Kaustinen
- Coordinates: 63°33′N 023°41.5′E
- Country: Finland
- Region: Central Ostrobothnia
- Sub-region: Kaustinen sub-region
- Charter: 1866

Government
  - Municipal manager: Minna Nikander

Area (2018-01-01)
  - Total: 361.12 km^{2} (139.43 sq mi)
  - Land: 353.91 km^{2} (136.65 sq mi)
  - Water: 7.09 km^{2} (2.74 sq mi)
  - Rank: 218th largest in Finland

Population (2025-12-31)
  - Total: 4,074
  - Rank: 187th largest in Finland
  - Density: 11.51/km^{2} (29.8/sq mi)

Population by native language
  - Finnish: 95% (official)
  - Swedish: 1.9%
  - Others: 3.1%

Population by age
  - 0 to 14: 18.8%
  - 15 to 64: 57.4%
  - 65 or older: 23.9%
- Time zone: UTC+02:00 (EET)
  - Summer (DST): UTC+03:00 (EEST)
- Website: kaustinen.fi

Kaustinen (Swedish: Kaustby) is a municipality of Finland. It is part of the Central Ostrobothnia region. The municipality has a population about 4300 and covers an area of 361.12 square kilometres (139.43 sq mi) of which 7.09 km^{2} (2.74 sq mi) is water. The population density is 11.51 inhabitants per square kilometre (29.8/sq mi).

Neighbouring municipalities are Halsua, Kokkola, Kronoby and Veteli. The municipality is unilingually Finnish.

It is the home of the Kaustinen Folk Music Festival, held every July, and one of its notable "house bands" include JPP. The violin appearing in the municipality's coat of arms refers to the locality's still continuing old tradition of Finnish folk music. The comic strip bird Woodstock from Peanuts, named for the rock music festival in Woodstock, New York, is called "Kaustinen" in Finnish with obvious reference to the folk music festival of the municipality.

Europe's largest lithium reserve is located in Kaustinen area. Kaustinen is also home a Finnish independent game studio Horsefly Games.

== Transport ==
Kaustinen is served by OnniBus.com route Helsinki–Jyväskylä–Kokkola.

== Famous people from Kaustinen ==
- Kreeta Haapasalo (1813–1893), Kantele player and songwriter
- Konsta Jylhä (1910–1984), folk music composer, fiddler and master pelimanni
- Pehr Henrik Nordgren (1944–2008), classical composer
