= Säkkipilli =

Generic Finnish term for bagpipes

Säkkipilli is the generic Finnish term for bagpipes, but is also applied to the formerly extinct traditional Finnish bagpipes which are currently being revived.

== History ==
Images of a bagpipe appear in painting dating to the 15th century at a church in Taivassalo, though is not definite as to whether the image is intended to depict a local Finnish tradition. Later 17th century sources make mention of the bagpipes in Turku.

== Revival ==
One prominent proponent of the revival of the Finnish pipes is the musician Petri Prauda. Prauda began playing the Estonian torupill, and later had a Finnish bagpipes reconstructed based on museum examples.
