= U-Street All Stars =

Finnish jazz band

U-Street All Stars is a Finnish jazz band founded in the fall of 2000. They have released two albums on Blue Note Records.

The letter U in their band name comes from the fact that they rehearse in Uudenmaankatu, Helsinki.

== Members ==
=== Current members ===
- Markus Holkko – alto sax
- Timo Lassy – tenor sax
- Teemu Viinikainen – guitar
- Ville Herrala – double bass (2004– )
- Jussi Lehtonen – drums

=== Past members ===
- Timo Tuppurainen – double bass (2000–2004)

== Releases ==
- Helsinki Sessions (2002)
- Bowling (2004)
