= Baltic Jazz =

Jazz Festival in Turku, Finland

The Baltic Jazz festival is one of the summer's highlights in the archipelago of Turku, Finland. It started in 1987 when Jazz-music enthusiasts in the village Dalsbruk (fin. Taalintehdas) arranged a local festival. By the mid-2010s the festival had grown to be one of the biggest jazz festivals in Finland. It takes place two weeks after midsummer, usually the second weekend in July.

== Reception ==
Lauri Karvonen of Helsingin Sanomat wrote in the early 1990s that the atmosphere of the Baltic Jazz event resembled that of the early years of Pori Jazz, and that despite minimal marketing it had grown into not only a significant jazz event but also the most important tourism event for the small locality — attracting, for example, around 6,000 festival visitors in 1992. While Pori Jazz had at that time begun courting the rock generation with acts such as Ringo Starr, Karvonen praised Baltic Jazz for sticking to Finnish jazz, emphasizing traditional swing and Dixieland.

== Artists who have performed at Baltic Jazz ==
- Antti Sarpila
- Bo Kaspers Orkester 2013
- Gunhild Carling & The Carling Family 2012
- Aziza Mustafa Zadeh 1990
- The Real Group
- Leroy Jones 2015
- Swedish Swing Society 2015
- Johanna Iivanainen
- Aili Ikonen 2015
- Pentti Lasanen
- Timo Lassy 2015
- huumoriryhmä Kaj
- Robin Packalen
- Redrama
- Pepe Ahlqvist
- Satin Circus
- Poets of the Fall
- Club for Five
- Edu Kettunen
- Remu & Hurriganes 2013
- Erja Lyytinen 2013
