= Kaustinen Folk Music Festival =

Finnish festival of dance and folk music

Coordinates: 63°33′46″N 023°41′34″E

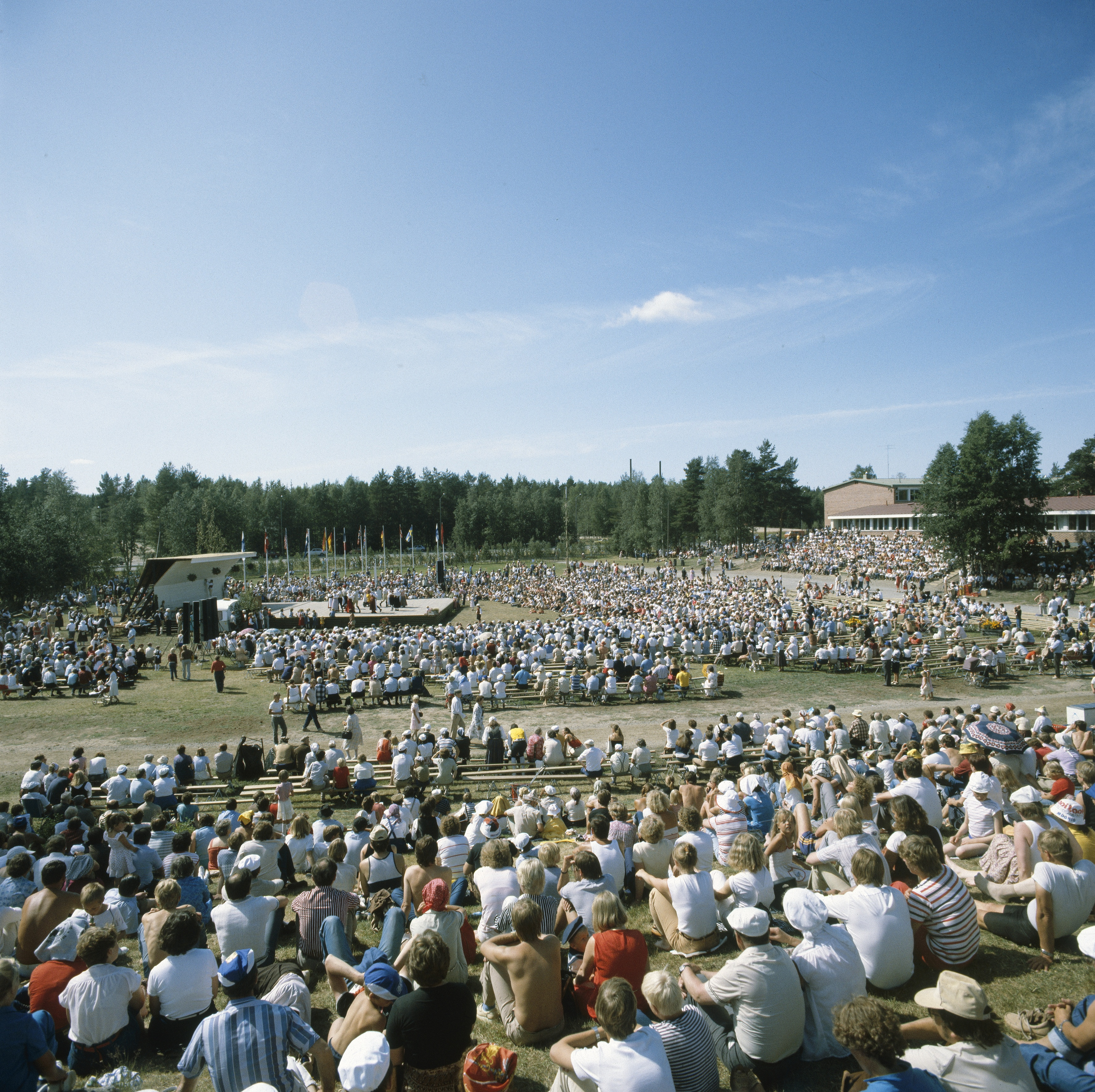
The main arena c. 1980

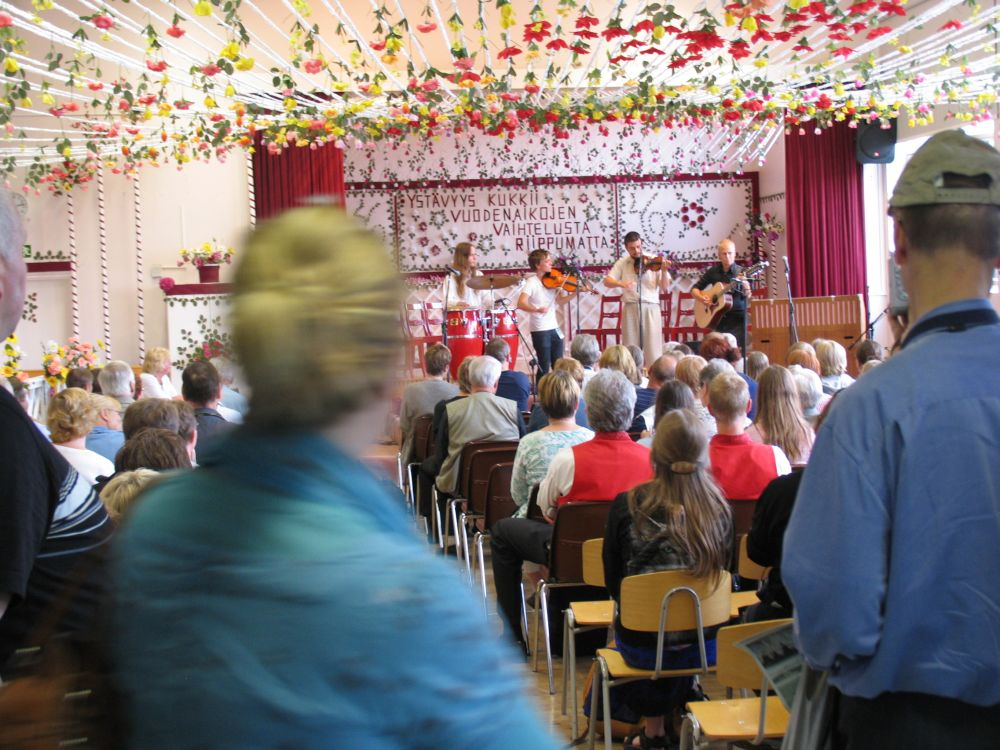
A traditional folk group performing

Kaustinen Folk Music Festival (Finnish: Kaustisen kansanmusiikkijuhlat), celebrated yearly in July in Kaustinen, Finland, is the biggest folk music and dance festival in the Nordic countries. It was first celebrated in 1968. The festival originated in showcasing the famous local fiddle-based music tradition, which has continued uninterrupted 250 or more years, and is still the emotional core of the event. Since 2021, Kaustinen fiddle playing and related practices and expressions is inscribed into UNESCO's Representative List of the Intangible Cultural Heritage of Humanity.

In its first year, the festival expected 6,000 visitors. The number was over three times the estimate, though. Nowadays the festival lasts a whole week and hosts 40,000–50,000 visits per year. Besides Finnish and international professional performers, 4,000–5,000 amateurs, forming 400–500 groups, participate the festival yearly. Over 1,000 scheduled performances in almost 30 venues and stages are given yearly, and dozens of workshops and other participatory programs are offered.

Since 1970 the festival has nominated yearly one or more persons as Master Folk Musician, Master Folk Singer or Master Folk Dancer, on the basis of their repertoire, skills and work for keeping up the traditions, as well as an Ensemble of the Year. These nominations are highly valued in Finnish folk music and dance community.

The festival is organized since 2012 by Pro Kaustinen Society, which is formed by three Kaustinen tradition bearers' organizations.

== Trivia ==
The Peanuts comic strip bird Woodstock, named for the rock music festival in Woodstock, New York, is called Kaustinen in Finnish with obvious reference to this folk music festival.
