= Tampere Music Festivals =

Three music events in Tampere, Finland

The Tampere Music Festivals organises three music events in the city of Tampere, Finland.

== Tampere Jazz Happening ==
The Tampere Jazz Happening takes place every November. It was first held in 1982. The programme features improvised music, world music and rock-influenced jazz. In addition to the jazz music, different workshops and art exhibitions take place during the event.

An audio CD, Live at the Tampere Jazz Happening 2000, was released with performances by the Kidd Jordan, Joel Futterman and Alvin Fielder Trio.

== Tampere Vocal Music Festival ==
The Tampere Vocal Music Festival is organised every second year in early June and was first held in 1975. The festival includes the popular international contest for vocal ensembles and the international chorus review. There are also various workshops and free-of-charge concerts taking place around the city. The total number of visitors is approximately 30 000 persons.

== Tampere Biennale ==
The Tampere Biennale introduces contemporary classical music by Finnish composers. The concert venues include Tampere Hall and the Old Customs House Hall. Finnish electronic music can be heard in the concerts at the Planetarium and Klubi. The festival has been organised since the year 1986 and the next edition will be in spring 2012.
