= Jazz Casual =

American television series on jazz

Jazz Casual was an occasional series on jazz music on National Educational Television (NET), the predecessor to the Public Broadcasting Service (PBS). The show was produced by Richard Moore and KQED of San Francisco, California. Episodes ran for 30 minutes. It ran from 1961 to 1968 and was hosted by jazz critic Ralph Gleason. The series had a pilot program in 1960. That episode, however, has been destroyed. 31 episodes were broadcast; 28 episodes survive. Most episodes included short interviews with the group leaders.

== Episodes ==
Episode	Performers	Compositions	Original Air Date
Dizzy Gillespie Quintet	Dizzy Gillespie (Trumpet); Leo Wright (Alto Saxophone, Flute); Lalo Schifrin (Piano); Bob Cunningham (Bass); Chuck Lampkin (Drums)	1. "Norm's Norm"; 2. "Blues After Dark"; 3. "Lorraine"; 4. "Tocatta from Gillespiana"	January 17, 1961
Dave Brubeck Quartet	Dave Brubeck (Piano); Paul Desmond (Alto Saxophone); Gene Wright (Bass); Joe Morello (Drums)	1. "Take Five"; 2. "It's a Raggy Waltz"; 3. "Castilian Blues"; 4. "Waltz Limp"; 5. "Blue Rondo A La Turk"	October 17, 1961
Cannonball Adderley Quintet	Cannonball Adderley (Alto Saxophone); Nat Adderley (Cornet); Joe Zawinul (Piano); Sam Jones (Bass); Louis Hayes (Drums)	1. "Scotch and Water"; 2. "Arriving Soon"; 3. "Unit Seven"	October 24, 1961
Jimmy Witherspoon	Jimmy Witherspoon (Vocals); Ben Webster (Saxophone); Vince Guaraldi (Piano); Monty Budwig (Bass); Colin Bailey (Drums)	1. "Time's Getting Tougher"; 2. "Ain't Nobody's Biz-ness"; 3. "Cotton Tail"; 4. "Chelsea Bridge"; 5. "I'm Gonna Move to the Outskirts of Town"; 6. "Roll 'Em"	January 4, 1962
Carmen McRae	Carmen McRae (Vocals); Norman Simmons (Piano); Victor Sproles (Bass); Walter Perkins (Drums)	1. "I'm Gonna Lock My Heart"; 2. "Trouble Is a Man"; 3. "If You Never Fall in Love with Me"; 4. "'Round Midnight"; 5. "Love for Sale"; 6. "Exactly Like You"	March 15, 1962
Sonny Rollins with Jim Hall	Sonny Rollins; Jim Hall; Bob Cranshaw; Ben Riley	1. "The Bridge"; 2. "God Bless The Child"; 3. "If Ever I Would Leave You"	March 23, 1962
Modern Jazz Quartet	John Lewis (Piano); Milt Jackson (Vibraphone); Percy Heath (Bass); Connie Kay (Drums)	1. "The Golden Striker"; 2. "If I Were Eve"; 3. "Winter Tale"; 4. "Lonely Woman"	May 16, 1962
Turk Murphy's San Francisco Jazz Band	Bob Neighbor (Trumpet); Bob Helm (Clarinet, Vocals); Turk Murphy (Trombone); Peter Clute (Piano); Harold Johnson (Tuba); Lloyd Byasse (Drums)	1. "1919 Rag"; 2. "Daybreak Blues"; 3. "Dr. Jazz"; 4. "Terrible Blues"; 5. "Sidewalk Blues"; 6. "Weary Blues"	June 20, 1962
Gerry Mulligan Quartet	Gerry Mulligan (Piano, Saxophone); Bob Brookmeyer (Trombone); Wyatt Ruther (Bass); Gus Johnson (Drums)	1. "Four for Three"; 2. "Darn That Dream"; 3. "Open Country"; 4. Utter Chaos	July 18, 1962
Jimmy Rushing: The Man Who Sings the Blues	Jimmy Rushing (Piano, Vocals)	1. "Goin 'to Chicago"; 2. "Am I to Blame"; 3. "Baby, Don't You Tell on Me"; 4. "Good Morning Blues"; 5. "Trix Ain't Walkin 'No More"; 6. "How Long Blues"; 7. (Untitled)	October 26, 1962
Louis Armstrong	Louis Armstrong (Doesn't perform, listens to old recordings and discusses them with host.)	1. "When It's Sleepy Time Down South"; 2. "Snake Rag"; 3. "Counting the Blues"; 4. "Skid-Dat-De-Dat"; 5. "Mack the Knife"	January 23, 1963
Earl "Fatha" Hines	Earl Hines (Piano); John Green (Bass); Earl Watkins (Drums)	1. "The One I Love Belongs to Someone Else"; 2. "Squeeze Me"; 3. "Love Is Just Around the Corner"	February 15, 1963
Lambert, Hendricks and Bavan	Dave Lambert (Vocals); Jon Hendricks (Vocals); Yolande Bavan (Vocals); Pony Poindexter (Saxophone); Gildo Mahones (Piano); George Tucker (Bass); Jimmie Smith (Drums)	1. "Sugar Hill Blues"; 2. "Another Get Together"; 3. "This Could Be the Start of Something Big"; 4. "Melba's Blues"; 5. "Shiny Stockings"; 6. "Cousin Mary"; 7. "Cloudburst"	February 22, 1963
Paul Winter Sextet	Paul Winter (Alto Saxophone); Richard Whitsell (Trumpet); Jay Cameron (Baritone Saxophone); Arthur Harper, Jr. (Bass); Warren Bernhardt (Piano); Ben Riley (Drums)	1. "Bells and Horns"; 2. "Port Au Prince Suite"; 3. "Casa Camara"; 4. "The Thumper"	March 1, 1963
Woody Herman and The Swingin' Herd (Pgm I)	Woody Herman (Clarinet); Bill Chase (Trumpet); Paul Fontaine (Trumpet); Dave Gale (Trumpet); Gerry Lamy (Trumpet); Billy Hunt (Trumpet); Phil Wilson (Trombone); Henry Southall (Trombone); Bob Rudolph (Trombone); Sal Nistico (Tenor Saxophone); Jackie Stevens (Tenor Saxophone); Bobby Jones (Tenor Saxophone); Frank Hittner (Baritone Saxophone); Nat Pierce (Piano); Chuck Andrus (Bass); Jake Hanna (Drums)	1. "Molasses"; 2. "El Toro Grande"; 3. "Lonesome Old Town"; 4. "That's Where It Is"; 5. "Cousins"	May 24, 1963
Bola Sete/Vince Guaraldi Trio	Bola Sete (Guitar); Vince Guaraldi (Piano); Fred Marshall (Bass); Jerry Granelli (Drums)	1. "Outra Vez"; 2. "Tango El Bongo"; 3. "Tour de Force"; 4. "Star Song"; 5. "Mambossa"	September 25, 1963
'Muggsy' Spanier	Muggsy Spanier (Cornet); Robert Mielke (Trombone); Darnell Howard (Clarinet); Joe Sullivan (Piano); George Pops Foster (Bass); Earl Watkins (Drums)	1. "St. Louis Blues"; 2. "Beale St. Blues"; 3. "Someday Sweetheart"; 4. "At the Jazz Band Ball"	December 6, 1963
John Coltrane Quartet	John Coltrane (Saxophone); Jimmy Garrison (Bass); Elvin Jones (Drums); McCoy Tyner (Piano)	1. "Afro Blue"; 2. "Alabama"; 3. "Impressions"	December 7, 1963
Joe Sullivan	Joe Sullivan (Piano)	1. "Gin Mill Blues"; 2. "Squeeze Me"; 3. "Little Rock Getaway"; 4. "Memories of You"; 5. "Black and Blue"	December 18, 1963
Art Farmer Quartet featuring Jim Hall	Art Farmer (Flugelhorn); Jim Hall (Guitar); Steve Swallow (Bass); Walter Perkins (Drums)	1. "Change Partners"; 2. "Some Time Ago"; 3. "My Kinda Love"; 4. "My Little Suede Shoes"; 5. "Bags' Groove"	January 10, 1964
Woody Herman and The Swingin' Herd (Pgm II)	Woody Herman (Alto Saxophone, Clarinet); Bill Chase (Trumpet); Paul Fontaine (Trumpet); Dave Gale (Trumpet); Gerry Lamy (Trumpet); Billy Hunt (Trumpet); Phil Wilson (Trombone); Henry Southall (Trombone); Bob Rudolph (Trombone); Sal Nistico (Tenor Saxophone); Carmen Leggio (Tenor Saxophone); Jackie Stevens (Tenor Saxophone); Tom Anastas (Baritone Saxophone); Nat Pierce (Piano); Chuck Andrus (Bass); Jake Hanna (Drums)	1. "Taste of Honey"; 2. "My Wish"; 3. "Deep Purple"; 4. "Early Autumn " 5. "Satin Doll"; 6. "Mood Indigo"; 7. "Blue Flame"	January 15, 1964
Woody Herman and The Swingin' Herd (Pgm III)	Woody Herman (Alto Saxophone, Clarinet); Bill Chase (Trumpet); Paul Fontaine (Trumpet); Dabby Nolan (Trumpet); Gerry Lamy (Trumpet); Billy Hunt (Trumpet); Phil Wilson (Trombone); Henry Southall (Trombone); Kenny Wexsel (Trombone); Sal Nistico (Tenor Saxophone); Carmen Leggio (Tenor Saxophone); Jackie Stevens (Tenor Saxophone); Tom Anastas (Baritone Saxophone); Nat Pierce (Piano); Chuck Andrus (Bass); Jake Hanna (Drums)	1. "Jazz Hoot"; 2. "Just Squeeze Me"; 3. "After You've Gone"; 4. Cousins	February 15, 1964
Mel Tormé and the Benny Barth Trio	Mel Tormé (Vocals); Gary Long (Piano); Perry Lind (Bass); Benny Barth (Drums)	1. "We've Got a World That Swings"; 2. "Comin' Home, Baby"; 3. "Sidney's Soliloquy"; 4. "Dat Dere"; 5. "When Sunny Gets Blue"; 6. "Quiet Night"; 7. "Route 66"	May 2, 1964
Art Pepper Quartet	Art Pepper (Saxophone); Bill Goodwin (Drums); Hersh Hamel (Bass); Frank Strazzeri (Piano)	1. "The Trip " 2. "D Section"; 3. (Untitled)	May 9, 1964
The Thad Jones/Mel Lewis Orchestra	Thad Jones (Cornet); Snooky Young (Trumpet); Richard Williams (Trumpet); Randy Brecker (Trumpet); Danny Moore (Trumpet); Garnett Brown (Trombone); Benny Powell (Trombone); Jimmy Knepper (Trombone); Bob Brookmeyer (Trombone); Jerry Dodgion (Alto Saxophone); Jerome Richardson (Alto and Soprano Saxophones); Seldon Powell (Tenor Saxophone); Eddie Daniels (Tenor Saxophone); Pepper Adams (Baritone Saxophone); Roland Hanna (Piano); Richard Davis (Bass); Mel Lewis (Drums)	1. "Just Blues"; 2. "St. Louis Blues"; 3. "Kids Are Pretty People"; 4. "Do not Get Sassy"	April 22, 1968
B.B. King - King of the Blues	B.B. King (Guitar); Sonny Freeman (Drums); Jim Toney (Organ); Mose Thomas (Trumpet); Lee Gatling (Saxophone)	1. "Whole Lotta Love"; 2. "I've Got a Mind to Give Up Livin '"; 3. "Think I'll Move to the Jungle"; 4. "Darling, You Know I Love You"; 5. "That's Wrong, Li'l Mama"; 6. (Untitled)	May 9, 1968
Charles Lloyd Quartet	Charles Lloyd (Flute, Tenor Sax); Keith Jarrett (Piano, Soprano Sax); Ron McClure (Bass); Jack DeJohnette (Drums)	1. "Love Ship"; 2. "Tagore"; 3. "Passin' Thru"; 4. "Forest Flower"	June 18, 1968
Count Basie Reminisces	Count Basie (Piano); Sonny Payne (Drums); Freddie Green (Guitar); Norman Keenan (Bass)	1. "I Don't Know"; 2. "Handful of Keys"; 3. (Untitled); 4. "Squeeze Me"; 5. "Twenty Minutes After Three"; 6. "As Long As I Live"; 7. "If I Could Be With You (One Hour Tonight)"; 8. "National Educational Television Blues"	August 21, 1968

== Video reissues ==
Rhino Records has reissued several performances from the series on DVD and videotapes. In 2004, Efor Films released the entire series on an 8-DVD box set entitled The Complete Jazz Casual Series.
