= Encore Woody Herman–1963 =

Live album by Woody Herman
- Released: 1963
- Recorded: May 1963
- Venue: Basin Street West Jazz Club, Los Angeles, California
- Genre: Jazz
- Label: Philips PHS 600-092
- Producer: Jack Tracy

Woody Herman chronology
Woody Herman–1963 (1963)	Encore Woody Herman–1963 (1963)

Encore Woody Herman–1963 is a 1963 live album by Woody Herman and his big band recorded at Basin Street West Jazz Club in Los Angeles, California, in May 1963.

== Track listing ==
1. "That's Where It Is" (Teddy Castion) - 3:58
2. "Watermelon Man" (Herbie Hancock) - 5:45
3. "Body and Soul" (Edward Heyman, Robert Sour, Frank Eyton, Johnny Green) - 4:50
4. "Better Get It In Your Soul" (Charles Mingus) - 5:27
5. "Jazz Me Blues" (Tom Delaney) - 2:52
6. "El Toro Grande" (Bill Chase) 4:50
7. "Days of Wine and Roses" (Henry Mancini, Johnny Mercer) 3:15
8. "Caldonia" (Fleecie Moore) - 7:40

== Personnel ==
- Nat Pierce - arranger, piano
- Bob Hammer - arranger
- Jack Gale - arranger, trombone
- Bill Chase - arranger, trumpet
- Chuck Andrus - double bass
- Woody Herman - clarinet, conductor, vocals on "Camel Walk"
- Phil Wilson - trombone
- Sal Nistico, Gordon Brisker, Larry Cavelli - tenor saxophone
- Eddie Morgan - trombone
- Paul Fontaine, Dave Gale, Billy Hunt, Gerald Lamy - trumpet
- Jake Hanna - drums
- Frank Hittner - baritone saxophone
