= Ocean Memories =

Compilation album by Bola Sete
- Released: December 14, 1999
- Recorded: March 1972 at Fantasy Studios
- Genre: Samba, jazz
- Length: 81:38
- Label: Samba Moon
- Producer: John Fahey and George Winston

Bola Sete chronology
| Jungle Suite (1985) | Ocean Memories (1999) | Jazz Casual: Paul Winter/Bola Sete and Vince Guaraldi (2001) |

Professional ratings
Review scores
| Source | Rating |
|---|---|
| Allmusic | 4/5 stars |

Ocean Memories is an anthology album by Brazilian guitarist Bola Sete, released in 1999 through Samba Moon Records. It contains his 1972 album Ocean on the first disc and unreleased recordings on the second.

== Track listing ==
All tracks are written by Bola Sete, except where noted.

Disc one
| No. | Title | Writer(s) | Length |
|---|---|---|---|
| 1. | "Vira Mundo Penba" | | 4:15 |
| 2. | "Guitar Lamento" | | 4:48 |
| 3. | "Let Go" | Powell | 4:43 |
| 4. | "Macumba" | | 3:41 |
| 5. | "The Lonely Gaucho in the Pampas Awaiting the Advent of Christmas" | | 2:31 |
| 6. | "Inn of the Beginning, Cotati" | | 2:27 |
| 7. | "Xengo Xengo Xererengo" | | 2:39 |
| 8. | "Ocean Waves (O Mar)" | Caymmi | 8:54 |
| 9. | "Jongo" | Pernambuco | 2:20 |
| 10. | "O Astronauta" | Moraes, Powell | 3:03 |
| 11. | "Paradise Love Song (Black Mommy)" | Chargas, Martius | 4:31 |

Disc two
| No. | Title | Writer(s) | Length |
|---|---|---|---|
| 1. | "Jongada" | Powell | 6:23 |
| 2. | "Maria Moita" | Lyra, de Moraes | 3:52 |
| 3. | "Tio George" | | 2:59 |
| 4. | "Meu Ogum" | | 3:12 |
| 5. | "Rosa Morena" | Caymmi | 3:17 |
| 6. | "Ocean Fantasy" | | 10:26 |
| 7. | "Nao E Bem Assim" | Powell | 2:22 |
| 8. | "Dindi" | Jobim | 4:36 |

== Personnel ==
- John Fahey – production
- Howard Johnston – remastering
- Bola Sete – guitar
- George Winston – production
