= Sal Nistico =

American jazz saxophonist (1940–1991)

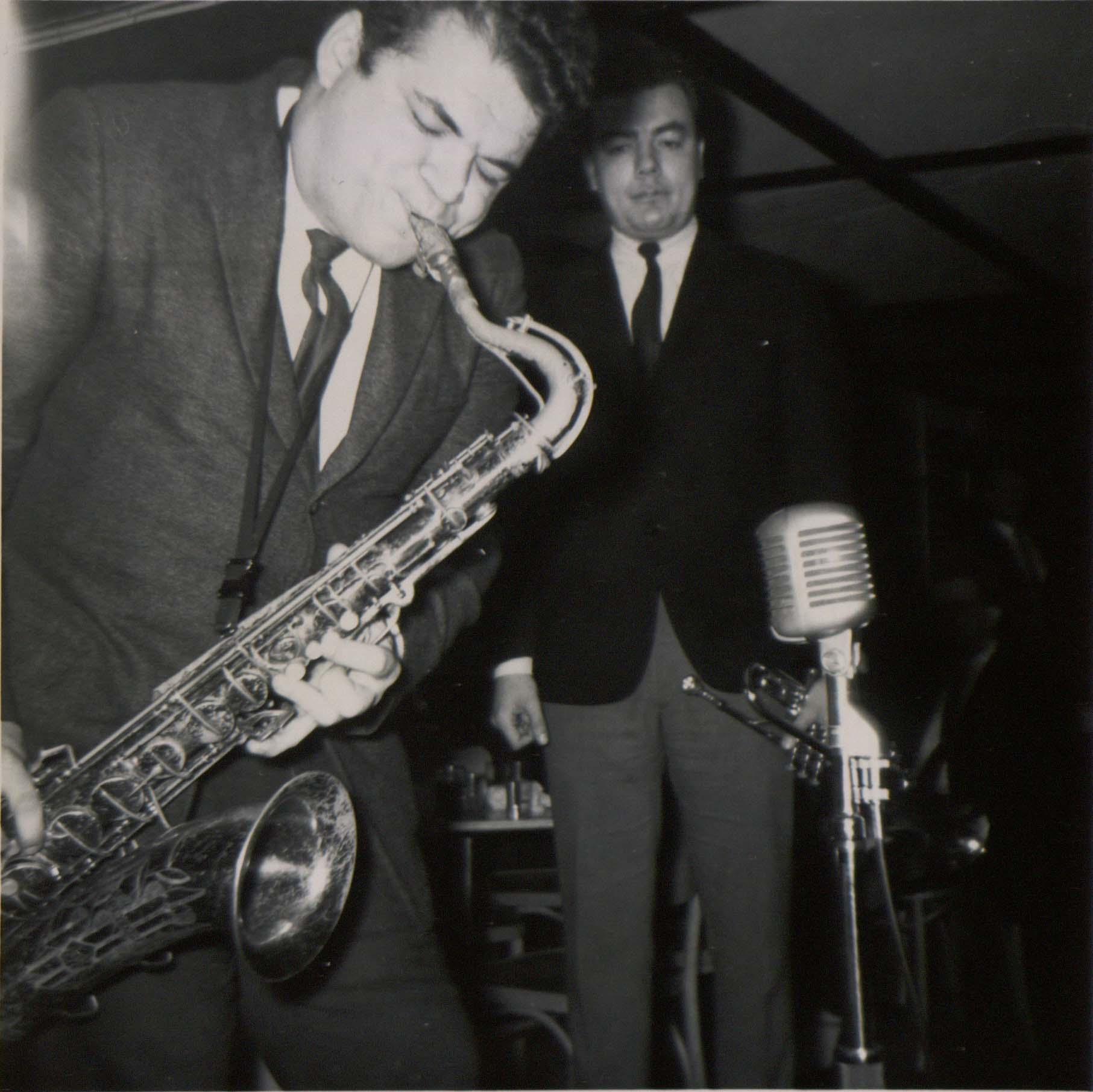
- Nistico with Paul Fontaine (right) at Lennie's on the Turnpike, 1965

Background information
- Born: Salvatore Nistico; April 2, 1940; Syracuse, New York, U.S.
- Died: March 3, 1991 (aged 52) Bern, Switzerland
- Genres: Jazz
- Occupation: Musician
- Instrument: Tenor saxophone
- Years active: 1950s–1990s
- Label: Riverside

Salvatore Nistico (April 2, 1938 – March 3, 1991) was an American jazz tenor saxophonist.

== Career ==
Nistico was born in Syracuse, New York, United States.

Associated for many years with Woody Herman's Herd, from 1962 to 1965, Nistico played with Bill Chase, Jake Hanna, Nat Pierce, and Phil Wilson in the group that was considered one of Herman's best bands.

He started playing alto saxophone, switching to tenor in 1956, on a Buescher before switching to a Conn 10M tenor saxophone, and briefly played baritone saxophone. From 1959 to 1961, he played with the Jazz Brothers band (Chuck and Gap Mangione).

In 1965, he joined Count Basie but returned on many occasions to play with Herman. Around that time, he was also a member of Duško Gojković's sextet with other musicians associated with the Herd, such as Carl Fontana, Nat Pierce, and Michael Moore. He also played with Nat Adderley, Don Ellis, Buddy Rich, and Stan Tracey. Living in Europe in his latter years, he worked with mostly European musicians, such as Joe Haider, Isla Eckinger, Billy Brooks, and Fritz Pauer, and recorded with the Larry Porter–Allan Praskin band and the Three Generations of Tenor Saxophone with Johnny Griffin, Roman Schwaller, Paul Grabowsky, Roberto DiGioia, Thomas Stabenow, Joris Dudli, and Mario Gonzi. The first live performance from January 1985 was released under the band's name on JHM Records, in Switzerland.

Nistico's solo work contrasts his big band work. His solo work is more oriented towards bebop, as heard on his 1962 album Heavyweights on Riverside Records.

He died in Bern, Switzerland, in March 1991, at the age of 50.

== Discography ==
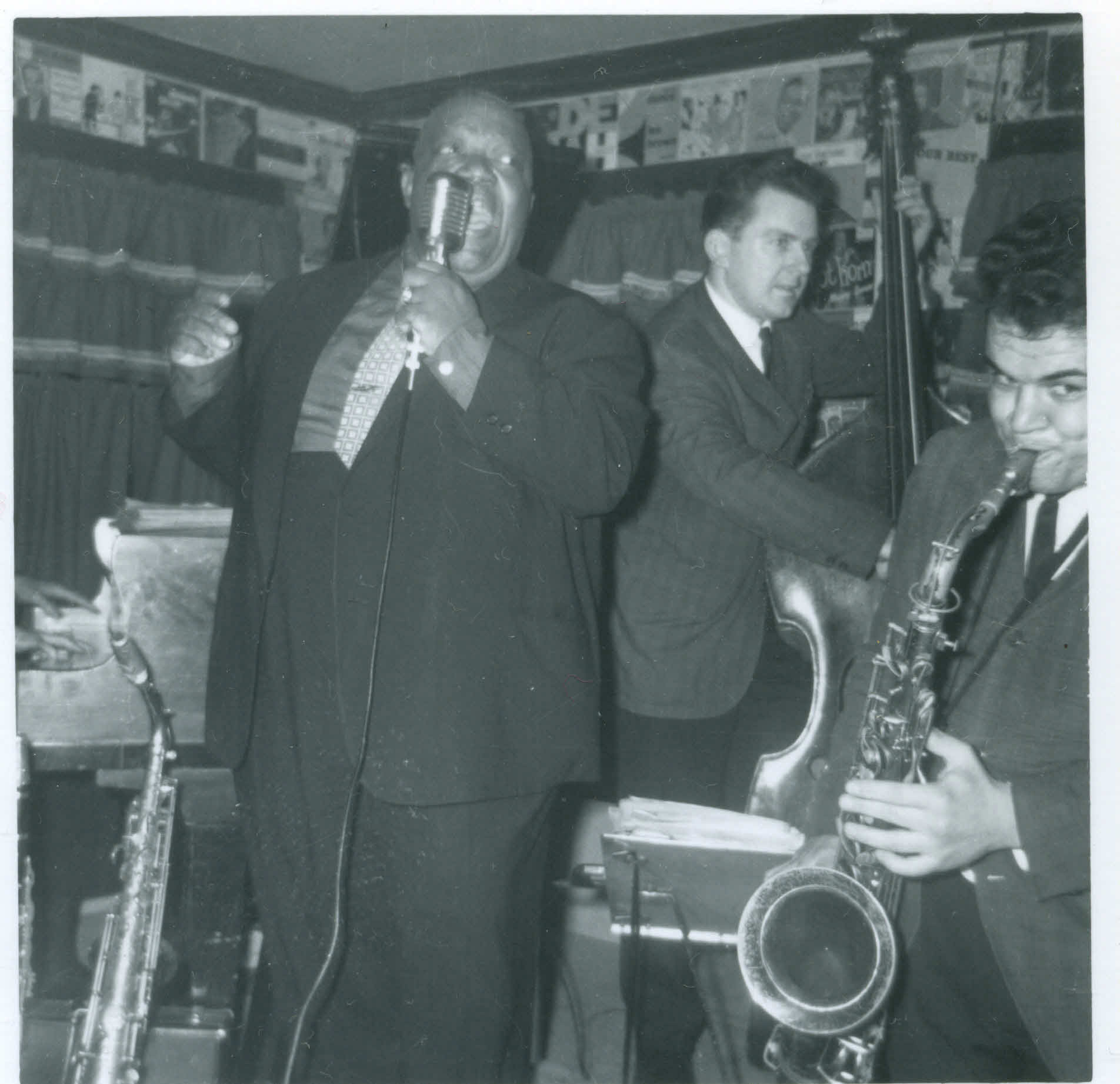
Nistico with the Woody Herman band, 1964. From left: Jimmy Rushing, Chuck Andrus, and Nistico.

=== As leader or co-leader ===
- 1961: Heavyweights (Milestone)
- 1962: Comin' On Up (Milestone)
- 1975: Jazz A Confronto (Horo Hill [Rome, Italy])
- 1978: East of Isar, The Sal Nistico–Benny Bailey Quintet (Ego)
- 1978: Neo/Nistico (Bee Hive)
- 1981: Woody Herman Presents, Vol. 2: Four Others Al Cohn, Sal Nistico, Bill Perkins, Flip Phillips (Concord Jazz)
- 1981: Live at Carmelo's 1981 (Fresh Sound)
- 1985: Three Generations of Tenor Saxophone – Johnny Griffin, Sal Nistico, & Roman Schwaller (JHM Records Switzerland; JHM 3611, released 1997)
- 1988: Empty Room (RED)
- 1995: Sal Nistico Live (Culture Press)
- 2001: Jazz Friends with Tullio De Piscopo (Amiata)
- 2010: Swiss Radio Days, Vol. 21 with Tony Scott (TCB)

=== As sideman or guest ===
With Chet Baker

- 1992: Live at Renaissance II (CD Baby)
- 1994: Nightbird (CLA)
- 1997: In a Soulful Mood (Music Club)
- 2001: Round Midnight (Fruit Tree)

With Count Basie

- 2005: NEA Jazz Masters–Count Basie (Verve)

With Sammy Davis Jr. and Count Basie

- 1965: Our Shining Hour (Verve)

With Curtis Fuller

- 1978: Fire and Filigree (Bee Hive)

With Woody Herman

- 1963: Woody Herman–1963 (Philips)
- 1963: Encore Woody Herman–1963
- 1964: Woody Herman–1964 (Philips)
- 1965: The Swinging Herman Herd-Recorded Live (Philips)
- 1965: Woody's Big Band Goodies (Philips)
- 1969: Woody Herman – Light My Fire (Cadet)
- 1992: World Class (Concord Jazz)
- 1994: Live at Newport & At the Hollywood Bowl (Jazz Band)

With The Jazz Brothers (Chuck & Gap Mangione)

- 1960: The Jazz Brothers (Riverside)
- 1961: Hey Baby! (Riverside)
- 1961: Spring Fever (Riverside)

With Helen Merrill

- 1980: Casa Forte (Mercury)

With Pony Poindexter

- 1962: Pony's Express (Epic)

With Larry Porter–Allan Praskin Quartet

- 1994: Sonnet for Sal (Enja)

With Buddy Rich

- 1974: Very Live at Buddy's Place (LRC)
- 1974: Transition – Buddy Rich & Lionel Hampton (Groove Merchant)
- 1989: Tuff Dude (LRC)

With Sarah Vaughan

- 1984: The Mystery of Man (Kokopelli)
