= Workin' on a Groovy Thing =

Workin' on a Groovy Thing may refer to:

- "Workin' On a Groovy Thing" (song), a 1968 song written by Neil Sedaka
- Workin' on a Groovy Thing (Patti Drew album), 1968
- Workin' on a Groovy Thing (Neil Sedaka album), 1969
- Workin' on a Groovy Thing (Bola Sete album), 1970
