= Bola Sete at the Monterey Jazz Festival =

Live album by Bola Sete
- Released: 1967
- Recorded: September 17, 1966 at the Monterey Jazz Festival, CA
- Genres: Bossa nova, samba
- Length: 28:05 (vinyl edition); 46:00 (CD edition)
- Label: Verve
- Producer: Creed Taylor

Bola Sete chronology
Shebaba (1967)	Bola Sete at the Monterey Jazz Festival (1967)	Working on a Groovy Thing (1970)

Professional ratings
Review scores
Source	Rating
Allmusic	4.5/5 stars

Bola Sete at the Monterey Jazz Festival is a live album by Brazilian guitarist Bola Sete, released in 1967 through Verve Records.

== Track listing ==
Side one
No.	Title	Writer(s)	Length
1.	"Medley: Manhã de Carnaval/A Felicidade/Samba de Orfeu"	Bonfá, Jobim	13:35

Side two
No.	Title	Writer(s)	Length
1.	"Soul Samba"	Sete	6:30
2.	"Flamenco"	Sete	8:00

CD Version
No.	Title	Writer(s)	Length
1.	"Medley: Manhã de Carnaval/A Felicidade/Samba de Orfeu"	Bonfá, Jobim	17:28
2.	"Soul Samba"	Sete	6:47
3.	"Flamenco"	Sete	8:32
4.	"Spoken Introduction"		0:39
5.	"Alice D."	Mello, Santos	5:01
6.	"Satin Doll"	Ellington, Mercer, Strayhorn	7:56

== Chart positions ==
Chart (1967)	Peak position
US Jazz	20

== Personnel ==
Musicians

- Paulinho da Costa – drums
- Sebastião Neto – bass guitar
- Bola Sete – guitar

Production and additional personnel

- Creed Taylor – production
- Val Valentin – engineering
- Acy Lehman – design

== Release history ==
Country	Date	Label	Format	Catalogue number
United States	1967	Verve	mono LP	V-8689
United States	1967	Verve	stereo LP	V6-8689
United States	2000	Verve	CD	314 543 379-2
