= Crystal Garden =

Crystal Garden may refer to:

- Crystal Garden (band)
- Crystal Garden, a historic building in Victoria, British Columbia, Canada
- Crystal Garden, a 2011 re-release of the 1973 Bola Sete album Goin' to Rio
- Chemical garden
