= Larry Porter =

Larry Porter may refer to:

- Larry Porter (American football) (born 1972), American football coach
- Larry Porter (musician) (born 1951), American jazz musician and composer
