= Autentico! =

Studio album by Bola Sete and His New Brazilian Trio
- Released: 1966
- Genres: Samba, jazz
- Length: 37:40
- Label: Fantasy

Bola Sete chronology
Live at El Matador (1966)	Autentico! (1966)	Shebaba (1967)

Professional ratings
Review scores
Source	Rating
Allmusic	4/5 stars

Autentico! is an album by Brazilian guitarist Bola Sete, released in 1966 through Fantasy Records. In 2004, it was reissued on CD on the anthology Voodoo Village.

== Track listing ==
All tracks are written by Bola Sete.

Side one
No.	Title	Length
1.	"Brejeiro"	4:00
2.	"Consolacao"	6:00
3.	"Quindim de yaya"	2:53
4.	"Soul Samba"	4:48

Side two
No.	Title	Length
1.	"Baion Blues"	2:55
2.	"Pau de arara"	3:09
3.	"Coisa"	6:20
4.	"Odeon"	2:45
5.	"Mulher Rendeira"	4:50

== Release history ==
Country	Date	Label	Format	Catalogue number
United States	1966	Fantasy	mono LP	3375
United States	1966	Fantasy	stereo LP	8375

== Personnel ==
- Paulinho da Costa – drums
- Sebastiao Neto – bass guitar, percussion
- Bola Sete – guitar
