= Live at Birdland (John Coltrane album) =

Studio album / Live album by John Coltrane
- Released: January 9, 1964
- Recorded: October 8, 1963 (Tracks 1–3); November 18, 1963 (Tracks 4–5)
- Venues: Birdland, New York City (Tracks 1–3)
- Studio: Van Gelder (Englewood Cliffs) (Tracks 4–5)
- Genres: Jazz; post-bop
- Length: 38:59 (Original LP); 43:35 (CD reissue)
- Label: Impulse! A-50
- Producer: Bob Thiele

John Coltrane chronology
| John Coltrane and Johnny Hartman (1963) | Live at Birdland (1964) | Coltrane's Sound (1964) |

Live at Birdland (titled on the cover Coltrane live at Birdland) is an album by the jazz saxophonist and composer John Coltrane. It was released on January 9, 1964, through Impulse! Records. Three of its tracks ("Afro Blue", "I Want to Talk About You", "The Promise") were recorded live at the Birdland club on October 8th 1963, and the others ("Alabama", "Your Lady", "Vilia") are studio recordings. "Alabama" is a tribute to four black children killed in the 16th Street Baptist Church bombing, a white supremacist terrorist attack in Birmingham, Alabama.

The album's original pressing accidentally included a false start; this was corrected in later copies but restored in CD editions. This live recording of "I Want to Talk About You", a song Coltrane had recorded on his 1958 album Soultrane, has an extended cadenza here.

Professional ratings
Review scores
| Source | Rating |
|---|---|
| AllMusic | 5/5 stars |
| The Penguin Guide to Jazz | 3.5/4 stars |
| Record Mirror | 4/5 stars |
| The Rolling Stone Jazz Record Guide | 4/5 stars |

== Reception ==
Scott Yanow's five-star AllMusic review calls the recording "[a]rguably John Coltrane's finest all-around album". A review in All About Jazz states: "Coltrane Live at Birdland showcases 'The Great Quartet' in excellent form: Elvin banging and cursin', McCoy a steady force maintaining the form, Jimmy Garrison pacing the beat and Coltrane stretching out into space filling the void... A definite collectors' item." Reviewer C. Michael Bailey wrote: "If the listener wishes to hear the master in transition, look no further than Coltrane Live at Birdland." LeRoi Jones wrote: "There is a daringly human quality to John Coltrane's music that makes itself felt, wherever he records. If you can hear, this music will make you think of a lot of weird and wonderful things. You might even become one of them." In 2017, Pitchfork ranked the album as the 128th best of the 1960s.

The journalist Ben Ratliff wrote of "Alabama": "It is a striking piece of music. If anyone wants to begin to understand how Coltrane could inspire so much awe so quickly, the reason is probably inside 'Alabama'. The incantational tumult he could raise in a long improvisation, the steel-trap knowledge of harmony, the writing—that's all very impressive. But 'Alabama' is also an accurate psychological portrait of a time, a complicated mood that nobody else could render so well."

== Track listing ==
All songs written by John Coltrane except as indicated.

Side 1
| No. | Title | Writer(s) | Length |
|---|---|---|---|
| 1. | "Afro Blue" | Mongo Santamaria | 10:50 |
| 2. | "I Want to Talk About You" | Billy Eckstine | 8:11 |
| Total length: | | | 19:01 |

Side 2
| No. | Title | Length |
|---|---|---|
| 1. | "The Promise" | 8:10 |
| 2. | "Alabama" | 5:09 |
| 3. | "Your Lady" | 6:39 |
| Total length: | | 19:58 38:59 |

1996 CD reissue bonus track
| No. | Title | Writer(s) | Length |
|---|---|---|---|
| 6. | "Vilia" | Franz Lehár | 4:36 |
| Total length: | | | 43:35 |

"Vilia" is a jazz arrangement of Franz Lehár's "Es lebt' eine Vilja, ein Waldmägdelein" from The Merry Widow. This track was first released on a 1965 compilation by Impulse!

== Personnel ==
- John Coltrane – tenor saxophone, soprano saxophone
- McCoy Tyner – piano
- Jimmy Garrison – double bass
- Elvin Jones – drums
