= Bossa Nova (Bola Sete album) =

Studio album by Bola Sete
- Released: 1962
- Recorded: October 22 – 26, 1962
- Studio: RCA Studios, New York City
- Genre: Jazz, bossa nova
- Length: 30:54
- Label: Fantasy

Bola Sete chronology
O Extraordinario Bola Sete (1961)	Bossa Nova (1962)	Vince Guaraldi, Bola Sete and Friends (1963)

Bossa Nova is an album by Brazilian guitarist Bola Sete that was released in 1962 by Fantasy Records.

== Release and reception ==
Professional ratings
Review scores
Source	Rating
Allmusic	4.5/5 stars

Richie Unterberger of Allmusic gave the album four out of five stars, calling Sete's music "virtuosic, yet at the same time imbued with passion and taste."

In 2001, Bossa Nova was issued on CD with Tour de Force.

== Track listing ==
All tracks are written by Bola Sete except where noted.

No.	Title	Length
1.	"Up the Creek"	2:08
2.	"My Different World"	2:00
3.	"Dilemma"	2:47
4.	"Sweet Thing"	3:14
5.	"If You Return" (Lupicínio Rodrigues)	2:35
6.	"Samba in the Perrotquei" (Djalma Ferreira)	2:50
7.	"Manhã de Carnaval" (Luiz Bonfá/Luigi Creatore/Antônio Maria/Hugo Peretti/George David Weiss)	2:16
8.	"Brazilian Bossa Galore"	2:35
9.	"You're the Reason" (Dolores Duran/Antônio Carlos Jobim)	3:15
10.	"Wagging Along"	2:53
11.	"Ash Wednesday" (Armando Marçal)	2:46
12.	"Without You"	1:34

== Personnel ==
- Bola Sete – guitar
- Ben Tucker – bass guitar
- Dave Bailey – drums

== Release history ==
Country	Date	Label	Format	Catalogue number
United States	1962	Fantasy	mono LP	3349
United States	1962	Fantasy	stereo LP	8349
