= The Solo Guitar of Bola Sete =

Studio album by Bola Sete
- Released: 1965
- Recorded: James Easton Studio
- Genres: Samba, jazz
- Length: 45:42
- Label: Fantasy

Bola Sete chronology
The Incomparable Bola Sete (1964)	The Solo Guitar of Bola Sete (1965)	Live at El Matador (1966)

The Solo Guitar of Bola Sete is an album by Brazilian guitarist Bola Sete, released in 1965 through Fantasy Records.

== Release and reception ==
Professional ratings
Review scores
Source	Rating
Allmusic	4.5/5 stars

Ron Wynn of allmusic called Solo Guitar an excellent showcase for Sete's skill, marked by "fluid passages, evocative quality, and a good blend of romantic, aggressive material."

== Track listing ==
Side one
No.	Title	Writer(s)	Length
1.	"Prelude #1"	Heitor Villa-Lobos	4:10
2.	"Spanish Dance #5"	Enrique Granados	4:33
3.	"Prelude #3"	Heitor Villa-Lobos	7:35
4.	"Prelude #4"	Heitor Villa-Lobos	3:26
5.	"Prelude #5"	Heitor Villa-Lobos	3:19

Side two
No.	Title	Writer(s)	Length
1.	"Choro #1"	Heitor Villa-Lobos	5:01
2.	"Chôro da saudade"	Agustín Barrios, Pierluigi Cimma	4:50
3.	"Brasiliance"	Laurindo Almeida	3:22
4.	"Sons de Carrilhões"	João Pernambuco, Turibio Santos	2:21
5.	"Flamenco Fantasy"	Bola Sete	6:59

== Release history ==
Country	Date	Label	Format	Catalogue number
United States	1965	Fantasy	mono LP	3369
United States	1965	Fantasy	stereo LP	8369

== Personnel ==
- Bola Sete – guitar
