= Vince Guaraldi, Bola Sete and Friends =

Studio album by Vince Guaraldi and Bola Sete
- Released: January 1964
- Recorded: August 1963
- Studios: Fantasy Recording Studios, San Francisco, California
- Genre: Latin jazz
- Length: 33:51
- Label: Fantasy

Vince Guaraldi chronology
In Person (1963)	Vince Guaraldi, Bola Sete and Friends (1964)	Jazz Impressions (1964)

Bola Sete chronology
Bossa Nova (1962)	Vince Guaraldi, Bola Sete and Friends (1963)	Tour de Force (1963)

Singles from Vince Guaraldi, Bola Sete and Friends
- 1. "Days of Wine and Roses" Released: 1964

Alternate cover
- Fantasy 2000 CD release cover art

Vince Guaraldi, Bola Sete and Friends (stylized as Vince Guaraldi \ Bola Sete \ and Friends) is a collaboration between pianist Vince Guaraldi and guitarist Bola Sete released in January 1964 by Fantasy Records. It was Guaraldi's fourth studio album and the first of three studio collaborations with Sete.

== Release and reception ==
Professional ratings
Review scores
Source	Rating
Allmusic	4.5/5 stars
The Rolling Stone Jazz Record Guide	3/5 stars
Five Cents Please	4/5 stars

Richard S. Ginell of AllMusic gave the album four and a half out of five stars, praising Guaraldi and Sete for fluidly combining their styles.

Guaraldi historian and author Derrick Bang offered equal praise, stating that Guaraldi and Sete represented "the perfect musical marriage," adding that Vince Guaraldi, Bola Sete and Friends is the "most consistent" of their three album collaborations.

Cashbox cited the album as a Jazz Pick: "Here's a delightful musical marriage spotlighting the distinctive musical talents of Bola Sete and Vince Guaraldi ... The two jazzmen compliment each other as they turn in superlative renditions of 'Days of Wine and Roses,' 'Star Song' and 'Moon Rays.' Loads of sales potential here."

In 2000, Vince Guaraldi, Bola Sete and Friends was issued on CD coupled with Live at El Matador (1966) as Vince & Bola.

== Track listing ==
Side One
No.	Title	Writer(s)	Length
1.	"Days of Wine and Roses"	Henry Mancini	5:20
2.	"Star Song"	Vince Guaraldi; William Siden	4:46
3.	"Mambossa"	Luiz Claudio de Castro; arr. by Bola Sete	8:45

Side two
No.	Title	Writer(s)	Length
1.	"Moon Rays"	Horace Silver	7:05
2.	"Casaba" (aka "Jambo's")	Vince Guaraldi	7:55
Total length:			33:51

== Personnel ==
- Bola Sete – guitar

Vince Guaraldi Trio

- Vince Guaraldi – piano
- Fred Marshall – double bass
- Jerry Granelli – drums

Additional

- Ralph J. Gleason – liner notes

== Release history ==
Country	Date	Label	Format	Catalogue number
United States	1963	Fantasy	Mono LP	3356
United States	1963	Fantasy	Stereo LP	8356

== See also ==
- Vince Guaraldi discography
- List of songs recorded by Vince Guaraldi
- List of cover versions of Vince Guaraldi songs
- Lee Mendelson Film Productions
