= Chase (Chase album) =

Studio album by Chase
- Released: April 3, 1971
- Recorded: November - December, 1970
- Venues: CBS Studios, Chicago
- Genres: Jazz-rock fusion; Classic rock
- Length: 33:09
- Label: Epic
- Producers: Frank Rand, Bob Destocki

Chase chronology
Chase (1971)	Ennea (1972)

Professional ratings
Review scores
Source	Rating
AllMusic	link

Chase is the debut album by jazz-rock fusion band Chase.

Bill Chase was already a well-established lead trumpet player when he decided to form his own band. He recruited three other veteran trumpet players and vocalist Terry Richards, backed them with a rock rhythm section, and created a band which merged both jazz and rock styles. The album was recorded at CBS Studios in Chicago in November and early December 1970 and released in April 1971.

The single "Get It On" spent thirteen weeks on the Billboard Hot 100 chart starting in May 1971, eventually peaking at #24 in July of that year. This success drove album sales to more than 400,000 units—unusually high for a jazz artist. The album charted for a total of 26 weeks, peaking at #22. "Get It On" peaked at number #76 in Australia in 1971. The LP was voted #1 pop album of 1971 in the Downbeat magazine's reader's poll.

== Release history ==
In addition the conventional stereo version, the album was released by Epic in a quadraphonic edition on LP and 8-track tape in 1972. The quad LP release was encoded with the SQ matrix system.

The stereo version of this album was re-released in Japan on CD in 1997. The album was reissued in the UK on the Super Audio CD format in 2018 by Dutton Vocalion. This one-disc release also contains Chase's 1974 album Pure Music. The Dutton Vocalion disc contains the complete stereo and quad mixes of both albums.

== Track listing ==
1. "Open Up Wide" (Bill Chase) – 3:48
2. "Livin' In Heat" (B. Hall, R. Turner, M. Walker) – 2:54
3. "Hello Groceries" (D. O'Rourke) – 2:56
4. "Handbags and Gladrags" (Mike d'Abo) – 3:23
5. "Get It On" (Chase, Terry Richards) – 2:59
6. "Boys and Girls Together" (Jim Peterik) – 2:56
7. "Invitation to a River" – 14:13

- "Two Minds Meet" (L. Raub, Chase)
- "Stay" (L. Raub, Chase)
- "Paint It Sad" (L. Raub, Chase)
- "Reflections" (Chase)
- "River" (T. Richards, Chase)

== Personnel ==
- Bill Chase - lead & solo trumpet
- Ted Piercefield - trumpet, lead vocal on "Handbags and Gladrags" and "Boys and Girls Together"
- Alan Ware - trumpet
- Jerry Van Blair - trumpet, lead vocal on "Hello Groceries"
- Phil Porter - keyboards
- Dennis Keith Johnson - bass guitar, vocals
- Angel South - (b. Lucien Gondron)guitar, vocals
- Jay "Burrid" Mitthauer - percussion
- Terry Richards - (b. Terrance Richard Marinan) lead vocals except as noted above

== Charts ==
=== Weekly charts ===
Chart (1971)	Peak position
Australian Albums (Kent Music Report)|	46
US Billboard 200	22

=== Year-end charts ===
Chart (1971)	Position
US Billboard 200	99
