= Pure Music =

Studio album by Chase
- Released: February 28, 1974
- Recorded: October–December 1973, Universal Recording Studios, Chicago, Illinois
- Genre: Jazz-rock fusion
- Length: 33:01
- Label: Epic
- Producer: Frank Rand

Chase chronology
Ennea (1972)	Pure Music (1974)	Watch Closely Now (1977)

Pure Music is the third and final album by jazz-rock fusion band Chase. The failure to sell the Ennea LP on a mass market forced Bill Chase to re-group several times and come up with a new musical approach; the result was Pure Music.

Though much of the music released on the album had been performed by the band over a span of a year and half, the new musical direction was a departure from vocal dominated songs and focusing more on jazz/rock instrumental tunes to showcase Bill's dynamic playing style. The overall effect had a more "commercial" appeal and was highly popular among high school and college band students.

Jim Peterik had co-written two vocal numbers for the album and to be performed live, "Run Back To Mama" and "Love Is On The Way"; a third vocal version of the song "Pure Music" was scrapped from the LP because it did not sound enough like Chase. Live versions of "Bochawa" and "Close Up Tight" were forever being altered on the road.

Work on a fourth LP was in the works and during 1974, Chase had been performing a melodic flugelhorn piece called "Ode To A New England Jellyfish" written by Bill; this tune was recorded during the summer of 1974 and was only missing Bill's solo section. A number of other charts were slated for potential inclusion, including "2001" a space odyssey theme (arranged by Bob Odjeda), an instrumental version of "Aphrodite" (from the Ennea LP) retitled "Shades of Venus," and Bill's arrangement of "MacArthur Park." Other selections, such as Bill's version of "Tubular Bells," never made it beyond the sketch stage.

On August 9, 1974, while en route to a scheduled performance at the Jackson County Fair, Bill Chase died in the crash of a chartered twin-engine Piper Twin Comanche in Jackson, Minnesota at the age of 39. Also killed, along with the pilot, Daniel Ludwig (41) of Chicago and Ludwig's secretary Linda Swisher (26) of Wheeling, Illinois, were keyboardist Wally Yohn, drummer Walter Clark and guitarist John Emma.

== Reception ==
Professional ratings
Review scores
Source	Rating
AllMusic	3.5/5 stars

In his retrospective review for AllMusic, critic Ross Boissoneau wrote that the album "represented a dramatic change in direction for the band. Where the group's first two albums were standard if scintillating jazz-rock not all that different from Blood, Sweat & Tears or Chicago, Pure Music pointed the way to fusion. Heady stuff made all the more engaging as there was sadly to be no follow-up."

== Release history ==
In addition to a conventional stereo version, the album was released by Epic in a quadraphonic edition on LP and 8-track tape in 1974. The quad LP release was encoded with the SQ matrix system.

The stereo version of the album was re-released in Japan on CD in 1997. The album was reissued in the UK in the Super Audio CD format in 2018 by Dutton Vocalion. This release is a two-album single-disc compilation which also contains Chase's 1971 debut album, Chase. The Dutton Vocalion disc contains the complete stereo and quad mixes of both albums.

== Track listing ==
1. "Weird Song #1" (Bill Chase) – 5:39
2. "Run Back To Mama" (Bill Chase/Jim Peterik) – 3:13
3. "Twinkles" (Bill Chase) – 7:14
4. "Bochawa" (Bill Chase) – 5:51
5. "Love Is On The Way" (Jim Peterik) – 3:30
6. "Close Up Tight" (Bill Chase) – 7:34

== Personnel ==
- Bill Chase – lead trumpet, flugelhorn
- Jay Sollenberger – trumpet
- Joe Morrissey – trumpet
- Jim Oatts – trumpet
- Dartanyan Brown – bass, vocals
- Wally Yohn – keyboard
- John Emma – guitar, vocals
- Tom Gordon – drums
- Jim Peterik – vocals
