= Neo/Nistico =

Studio album by Sal Nistico
- Released: 1978
- Recorded: November 3, 1978
- Studios: Master Sound Productions, Franklin Square, NY
- Genre: Jazz
- Length: 44:01
- Label: Bee Hive Records BH 7006
- Producers: Jim Neumann, Fred Norsworthy

Sal Nistico chronology
East of Isar (1978)	Neo/Nistico (1978)	Empty Room (1988)

Neo/Nistico is an album by saxophonist Sal Nistico which was recorded in 1978 and released on the Bee Hive label.

== Reception ==
Professional ratings
Review scores
Source	Rating
AllMusic	3/5 stars
DownBeat	4/5 stars

The AllMusic review by Scott Yanow stated, "For this Bee Hive LP Nistico heads a sextet filled with notables ... The soloists are all in fine form during the obscure but worthy session".

== Track listing ==
No.	Title	Writer(s)	Length
1.	"Anthropology"	Charlie Parker, Dizzy Gillespie	8:03
2.	"You Don't Know What Love Is"	Gene de Paul, Don Raye	7:23
3.	"Be My Love"	Nicholas Brodzsky, Sammy Cahn	7:40
4.	"Blues for K.D."	Sal Nistico	6:17
5.	"Bambu"	Nistico	8:42
6.	"Fee-Fi-Fo-Fum"	Wayne Shorter	5:56
Total length:			44:01

== Personnel ==
- Sal Nistico – tenor saxophone
- Ted Curson – trumpet
- Nick Brignola – baritone saxophone
- Ronnie Mathews – piano
- Sam Jones – bass
- Roy Haynes – drums
