= Chase (band) =

1970s American jazz rock band

- Origin: United States
- Genre: Jazz rock • Classic rock
- Years active: 1970–1974; 1977–1979
- Labels: Epic, Churchill
- Past members: Bill Chase; Terry Richards; Ted Piercefield; Alan Ware; Jerry Van Blair; Phil Porter; Angel South; Denis Johnson; Jay Burrid; G. G. Shinn; John Emma; Russ Freeland; Jim Oatts

Chase were an American jazz rock band led by Bill Chase. They are best known for their 1971 hit single, "Get It On".

== History ==
=== 1970–1972: Early success ===
The band Chase was created in 1970 by Bill Chase, Ted Piercefield, Alan Ware, and Jerry Van Blair, all veteran jazz trumpeters who were also adept at vocals and arranging. They were backed up by a rhythm section consisting of Phil Porter on keyboards, Angel South (born Lucien Gondron from Port Arthur, TX) on guitar, Dennis Johnson on bass, and Jay Burrid (born John Mitthauer) on percussion. Rounding out the group was Terry Richards, who was featured as lead vocalist on the first album. In April 1971, the band released their debut album, Chase, which contains Chase's best-known song, "Get It On", released as a single that spent 13 weeks on Billboard's Hot 100 beginning in May 1971, eventually peaking at #24 in July of that year. The band received a Best New Artist Grammy Award nomination, but was edged out by Carly Simon. Due to television spots on the Tonight Show and Tommy Smothers' Organic Prime Time Space Ride, 1971 proved to be the band's most fruitful year. Chicago's WBBM televised a 1/2 hour special featuring the group but was aired only around the Chicago area. Appearances at both the Kansas City Jazz and Newport Jazz Festival boosted the band's popularity.

=== 1972–1974: Decline and re-emergence ===
Chase released their second album, Ennea, in March 1972; the album's title is the Greek word for nine, a reference to the nine band members. The original line-up changed midway through the recording sessions, with Gary Smith taking over on drums and G. G. Shinn replacing Terry Richards on lead vocals. Although the first Chase album sold nearly 400,000 copies, Ennea was not as well received by the public. A single, "So Many People", received some radio play.

Following an extended hiatus, Chase re-emerged early in 1974 with the release of Pure Music, their third album. Featuring a new line-up, yet keeping the four-trumpet section headed by Bill Chase, the group moved further from the rock idiom, and became more focused on jazz. Some of the songs were written by Jim Peterik of the Ides of March, who also sings on the album, along with singer and bassist Dartanyan Brown.

=== 1974–present: Plane crash and later years ===
Chase's work on a fourth studio album in mid-1974 came to an end on August 9, 1974. While en route to a scheduled performance at the Jackson County Fair in Minnesota, Bill Chase died at the age of 39 in the plane crash of a chartered twin-engine Piper Twin Comanche in Jackson, Minnesota. Also killed, along with the pilot and a female companion, were keyboardist Wally Yohn, drummer Walter Clark, and guitarist John Emma.

== Legacy ==
Bass player Dartanyan Brown is now a music teacher on the faculty of Marin Academy in San Rafael, California.

Trumpet player Jim Oatts is a member of the adjunct faculty of Simpson College in Iowa.

The lead vocalist on Ennea, G. G. Shinn, died on August 7, 2018, in Monroe, Louisiana, after a long illness.

== Past members ==
- Bill Chase
- Terry Richards
- Ted Piercefield
- Alan Ware

Byron Lingenfelter John Palmer Brent Alverson

- Jerry Van Blair
- Phil Porter
- Angel South
- Denis Johnson
- Jay "Burrid" Mitthauer
- G. G. Shinn
- John Emma
- Jim Oatts
- Lynn Nicholson
- Wally Yohn
- Dartanyan Brown

Tommy Gordon Rick Gardner Joe Correro Wally Yohn Jerry Manfredi Davy Ferguson Carl Haiflie Tony DeCaprio Fred Raulston Jay Sollenberger Skip Weisser Russ Freeland Jim Oatts Joe Morrisey Walt Clark

== Discography ==
=== Albums ===
| Year | Title | Chart positions |
| Year | Title | US |
|---|---|---|
| 1971 | Chase | 22 |
| 1972 | Ennea | 71 |
| 1974 | Pure Music | 155 |
| 1977 | Watch Closely Now | — |
| 1996 | Listen to Her Sing | — |
| 1998 | Live Forever | — |
| 2001 | The Concert Series Volume 1, 2 & 3 | — |
| 2011 | Chase: Live 2010 | — |

=== Singles ===
| Year | Title | Chart positions | | |
| Year | Title | US BB | US RW | CAN |
|---|---|---|---|---|
| 1971 | "Get It On" | 24 | 19 | 23 |
| 1971 | "Handbags and Gladrags" | 84 | — | — |
| 1971 | "So Many People" | 81 | — | — |
| 1972 | "I Can Feel It" | 105 | — | — |
| 1972 | "Woman of the Dark" | — | — | — |
| 1974 | "Run Back to Mama" | — | 124 | — |
| 1974 | "Bochawa" | — | — | — |
| 1979 | "Theme From Superman" | — | 110 | — |
