= Ennea =

Studio album by Chase
- Released: March 1972
- Recorded: August 31 - September 8, 1971 & November 15 - December 8, 1971
- Studios: CBS Studios, San Francisco, California
- Genre: Jazz-rock
- Length: 41:26
- Label: Epic
- Producers: Frank Rand, Bob Destocki

Chase chronology
Chase (1971)	Ennea (1972)	Pure Music (1974)

Ennea is the second album by jazz-rock band Chase. It did not repeat the commercial success of their debut album, Chase.

== Overview ==
The original lineup from the first album was changed midway through the recording sessions, with Gary Smith taking over from Jay Burrid on drums and G. G. Shinn replacing Terry Richards on lead vocals. Sessions for the recording occurred August 31-September 8, 1971, at CBS/Columbia Studios in San Francisco and again between November 15 and December 8, 1971. According to Chase's attorney Alex Deveince, the cost of the album went $120,000 over budget.

The six songs on side two of the album comprise a progressive-jazz/rock suite entitled "Ennea", with lyrics based on Greek mythology. The album's title is the Greek word for nine, a reference to the nine band members. The lyrics to the suite were written by Bill Chase's longtime lady companion Erin Adair. The tune "Cronus" was originally used as an instrumental.

The single "So Many People" (written by Paul Williams and performed by both him and The Neighborhood) saw limited airplay in the U.S. The album charted for just 12 weeks, peaking at #71.

Part of the song "Cronus" was featured in the intro to the Telewizja Polska show "Magazyn Kryminalny 997".

"Swanee River", which opens the album, was originally entitled "Closer to the feeling" and was going to have a quasi–Allman Brothers flavor, but the lyrics had yet to be written. When G. G. Shinn was listening to the playbacks in the studio, he noted the chord changes were the same as Stephen Foster's immortal "Old Folks at Home", so the title was altered.

"It Won't Be Long" was penned by organist Phil Porter and initially was much slower and had more of an "Asian" feel. Charlie Brent re-arranged the song for the band to feature a screaming solo for Bill and highlight the brilliance of the trumpets more.

The songs "Darkest Days" and "Listen To Her Sing" were slated to be included on the album; however, original vocalist Terry Richards was fired in November 1971 before recordings were completed.

The album cover was photographed in December 1971 by renowned rock photographer Jim Marshall at the Music Concourse plaza in Golden Gate Park in San Francisco.

== Reception ==
Professional ratings
Review scores
Source	Rating
Allmusic	3/5 stars

In his retrospective review for Allmusic, critic Bruce Eder wrote that although the band's second album appeared with high expectations, "Ennea fell so far short in critical reception and sales... What was lacking was balance—the rock and jazz elements that seemed so finely tuned together on the first album don't coexist as easily on this album... Ennea still has lots of good moments and some great ones—greater, at times, that anything on the first album if nowhere near as appealing and concise overall—and is still worth hearing."

== Track listing ==
1. "Swanee River" (Stephen Foster, Bill Chase) – 3:10
2. "So Many People" (Paul Williams, R. Nichols) – 2:44
3. "Night" (Ted Piercefield) – 2:38
4. "It Won't Be Long" (Phil Porter, J. Soukup) – 3:06
5. "I Can Feel It" (Angel South) – 2:51
6. "Woman of the Dark" (T. Riley, T. Szollosi) – 5:56
7. "Cronus (Saturn)" (Chase, Erin Adair, J. Palmer) – 4:46
8. "Zeus (Jupiter)" (Chase, Adair) – 4:36
9. "Poseidon (Neptune)" (Chase, Adair) – 2:27
10. "Aphrodite Part I (Venus)" (Chase, Adair) – 2:02
11. "Aphrodite Part II (Venus)" (Chase, Adair) – 3:36
12. "Hades (Pluto)" (Chase, Adair) – 3:34

== Personnel ==
- Bill Chase - lead and solo trumpet
- Ted Piercefield - trumpet, vocals on "Night"
- Alan Ware - trumpet
- Jerry Van Blair - trumpet, flugelhorn
- Gary Smith - drums except as noted below
- Dennis Keith Johnson - bass guitar
- Phil Porter - Hammond B-3 organ
- Angel South - guitar
- G. G. Shinn - vocals
- Jay Burrid - drums on "So Many People," "Night," "Woman Of The Dark"
- Terry Richards - vocals on "So Many People"
