= Gordon Brisker =

American jazz saxophonist

- Born: Gordon Brisker; November 6, 1937; Cincinnati, Ohio, U.S.
- Died: September 10, 2004 (aged 66)
- Genres: Jazz
- Instruments: Saxophone, Piano

Gordon Brisker (November 6, 1937 in Cincinnati, Ohio – September 10, 2004) was an American jazz tenor saxophonist.

Brisker began on piano as a child, and studied reed instruments at the Cincinnati Conservatory of Music. He played with Ralph Marterie before enrolling in the Berklee College of Music. Following this he worked with Al Belletto, Bill Berry, and Woody Herman (1960–63), then moved to New York City, where he played with Louie Bellson and Gerry Mulligan. After a short time back in Cincinnati, Brisker then moved to Los Angeles, where he worked extensively as a studio musician. From 1983 to 1985, Brisker taught at Berklee, and during this time also arranged for Herb Pomeroy; after 1985 he returned to Los Angeles. He recorded extensively with Anita O'Day and Bobby Shew among others, and recorded several albums under his own name. In the 1990s, Brisker moved to Australia and taught at the Sydney Conservatorium of Music.

Brisker died of pancreatic cancer on September 10, 2004, at the age of 66.

== Discography ==
- Collective Consciousness (Sutra, 1980)
- Cornerstone (Sea Breeze, 1983)
- About Charlie (Musicraft, 1985)
- New Beginning (Discovery, 1987)
- The Gift (Naxos, 1996)
- My Son John (Naxos, 2001)
- Child's Play (Jazzgroove, 2004)

With Woody Herman

- Woody Herman–1963 (Philips, 1963)
