= Jazz Casual: Paul Winter/Bola Sete and Vince Guaraldi =

Live album by Paul Winter, Vince Guaraldi and Bola Sete
- Released: 2001
- Recorded: March 1; September 25, 1963
- Venues: KQED television studio, San Francisco, California
- Genres: Jazz; Latin jazz; Bossa nova
- Length: 57:33
- Labels: Koch Jazz; Rhino Entertainment
- Producers: Ralph J. Gleason; Donald Elfman; Naomi Yoshii

Vince Guaraldi chronology
Charlie Brown's Holiday Hits (1998)	Jazz Casual: Paul Winter/Bola Sete and Vince Guaraldi (2001)	The Charlie Brown Suite & Other Favorites (2003)

Bola Sete chronology
Ocean Memories (1999)	Jazz Casual: Paul Winter/Bola Sete and Vince Guaraldi (2001)	Voodoo Village (2004)

Professional ratings
Review scores
Source	Rating
AllMusic	3/5 stars
Five Cents Please	3/5 stars

Jazz Casual: Paul Winter/Bola Sete and Vince Guaraldi is a live performance album featuring performances by saxophonist Paul Winter, guitarist Bola Sete and pianist Vince Guaraldi, released in 2001 by Koch Jazz. The release contains two separate episodes of the National Educational Television Jazz Casual television show that aired in March and September 1963.

== Track listing ==
Paul Winter Sextet – March 1, 1963
No.	Title	Writer(s)	Length
1.	"Bells and Horns"	Milt Jackson	4:31
2.	"Interview: Ralph J. Gleason and Paul Winter"		4:47
3.	"Port Au Prince Suite: a) Invocation to Dambala b) Prayer c) Papa Zimbi"	Warren Bernhardt	11:53
4.	"Commentary by Paul Winter"		0:22
5.	"Casa Camara"	Richard Evans	5:34
6.	"Thumper" (incomplete – fades before end)	Jimmy Heath	1:41
Total length:			28:48

Vince Guaraldi Trio & Bola Sete – September 25, 1963
No.	Title	Writer(s)	Performer	Length
7.	"Outra Vez"	Antônio Carlos Jobim	Vince Guaraldi Trio & Bola Sete	7:46
8.	"Interview: Ralph J. Gleason and Bola Sete"			2:47
9.	"Tango El Bongo"	George Van Eps	Bola Sete	2:41
10.	"Tour de Force"	Dizzy Gillespie	Bola Sete with Fred Marshall and Jerry Granelli	2:48
11.	"Interview: Ralph J. Gleason and Vince Guaraldi"			0:47
12.	"Star Song"	Vince Guaraldi; William Siden	Vince Guaraldi Trio & Bola Sete	4:56
13.	"Mambossa" (incomplete – fades before end)	Luiz Claudio de Castro (uncredited); arr. by Bola Sete	Vince Guaraldi Trio & Bola Sete	4:29
Total length:				28:45

== Personnel ==
Credits adapted from CD liner notes.

- Bola Sete – guitar

Paul Winter Sextet

- Paul Winter – alto saxophone
- Jay Cameron – baritone saxophone
- Richard Whitsell – trumpet
- Warren Bernhardt – piano
- Arthur Harper, Jr. – bass
- Ben Riley – drums

Vince Guaraldi Trio

- Vince Guaraldi – piano
- Fred Marshall – double bass
- Jerry Granelli – drums

Additional

- Ralph J. Gleason – host, producer
- Toby Gleason – liner notes
- Peter Keepnews – liner notes

== See also ==
- Vince Guaraldi discography
- List of songs recorded by Vince Guaraldi
- List of cover versions of Vince Guaraldi songs
- Lee Mendelson Film Productions
