= Live at El Matador =

Live album by Vince Guaraldi and Bola Sete
- Released: October 1966
- Recorded: Spring 1965
- Venues: El Matador Jazz Club, San Francisco, California
- Genres: Jazz; Bossa nova; Samba
- Length: 37:42
- Label: Fantasy

Vince Guaraldi chronology
A Charlie Brown Christmas (1965)	Live at El Matador (1966)	Vince Guaraldi with the San Francisco Boys Chorus (1967)

Bola Sete chronology
The Solo Guitar of Bola Sete (1965)	Live at El Matador (1966)	Autentico! (1966)

Singles from Live at El Matador
- 1. "I'm a Loser" Released: 1966

Alternate cover
- Fantasy 2000 CD release cover art

Professional ratings
Review scores
Source	Rating
AllMusic	4/5 stars
The Rolling Stone Jazz Record Guide	3/5 stars
Five Cents Please	4/5 stars

Live at El Matador is a live performance album by pianist Vince Guaraldi and guitarist Bola Sete, released in October 1966 by Fantasy Records. It is their third and final recorded collaboration as well as Guaraldi's last release for Fantasy.

In 2000, it was issued on CD coupled with Vince Guaraldi, Bola Sete and Friends (1964) as Vince & Bola.

== Background ==
Live at El Matador is a condensed version of a live performance that Guaraldi and Sete regularly presented at this point in their collaboration. Guaraldi and his trio performed their set first, followed by a solo performance from Sete, and then concluded with Guaraldi's trio rejoining Sete for a joint finale. Live at El Matador contains the first and third segments of a performance, excising Sete's solo set. The original vinyl release contained Guaraldi's opening set on Side One and the concluding Guaraldi/Sete set on Side Two.

Despite Live at El Matador being a live album, Fantasy Record engineers faded several selections rather than letting them naturally conclude with audience applause. Guaraldi historian and author Derrick Bang commented that this "results in some jarringly abrupt fades, most disturbingly on 'I'm a Loser'."

== Track listing ==
Side One (Vince Guaraldi Trio)
No.	Title	Writer(s)	Length
1.	"I'm a Loser"	John Lennon; Paul McCartney	2:39
2.	"El Matador"	Vince Guaraldi	4:34
3.	"People" (from the musical Funny Girl)	Bob Merrill; Jule Styne	3:53
4.	"Nobody Else"	Vince Guaraldi	2:24
5.	"More" (Theme from Mondo Cane)	Marcello Ciorciolini; Norman Newell; Nino Oliviero; Riz Ortolani	4:37

Side Two (Vince Guaraldi Trio and Bola Sete)
No.	Title	Writer(s)	Length
6.	"Favela" (aka "O Morro Nao Tem Vez [Somewhere in the Hills]")	Antônio Carlos Jobim; Vinicius de Moraes	8:52
7.	"Black Orpheus Suite"	Luiz Bonfá; Antônio Carlos Jobim	10:53
Total length:			37:42

== Personnel ==
Credits adapted from rear cover of original 1966 vinyl release.

- Bola Sete – guitar (Tracks 6, 7)

Vince Guaraldi Trio

- Vince Guaraldi – piano
- Tom Beeson – double bass
- Lee Charlton – drums

Additional

- Wally Heider – mastering
- Fred Schill – design
- James Easton – sound engineer
- Jack Engelman – liner notes

== Release history ==
Country	Date	Label	Format	Catalogue number
United States	1966	Fantasy	Mono LP	3371
United States	1966	Fantasy	Stereo LP	8371
United States	1966	Fantasy	Stereo Reel-to-Reel	FAC 8371
United States	1975	Fantasy	Stereo LP	8371
United States	1979	Fantasy	Stereo LP	F-8371
United States	1987	Fantasy/Original Jazz Classics	Stereo LP	OJCCD-289-2, F-8371
United States	1987	Fantasy/Original Jazz Classics	Stereo LP, red vinyl	OJCCD-289-2, F-8371

== See also ==
- Vince Guaraldi discography
- List of songs recorded by Vince Guaraldi
- List of cover versions of Vince Guaraldi songs
- Lee Mendelson Film Productions
