= Heavyweights (album) =

Studio album by Sal Nistico
- Released: 1962
- Recorded: December 20, 1961
- Studio: Plaza Sound Studios, New York City
- Genre: Jazz
- Length: 40:00
- Label: Jazzland JLP 66
- Producer: Orrin Keepnews

Sal Nistico chronology
Heavyweights (1962)	Comin' On Up (1962)

Heavyweights is the debut album led by saxophonist Sal Nistico which was recorded in 1961 and released on the Jazzland label.

== Reception ==
Professional ratings
Review scores
Source	Rating
AllMusic	4/5 stars
The Penguin Guide to Jazz Recordings	4/4 stars

The AllMusic review by Scott Yanow stated, "the recorded debut of tenor saxophonist Sal Nistico as a leader is quite impressive" noting that Nistico "really romps through most of the seven tunes" and "Adderley is also heard in prime form on the superior bop date".

== Track listing ==
No.	Title	Writer(s)	Length
1.	"Mamblue"	Barry Harris	5:41
2.	"Seconds, Anyone"	Sal Nistico	3:59
3.	"My Old Flame"	Arthur Johnston, Sam Coslow	6:43
4.	"Shoutin'"	Tommy Turrentine	5:16
5.	"Just Friends"	John Klenner, Sam M. Lewis	6:35
6.	"Au Privave"	Charlie Parker	6:11
7.	"Heavyweights"	Frank Pullara	5:40
Total length:			40:00

== Personnel ==
- Sal Nistico – tenor saxophone
- Nat Adderley – cornet (tracks 1, 2 & 4–7)
- Barry Harris – piano
- Sam Jones – bass
- Walter Perkins – drums
