= Alabama (John Coltrane song) =

1963 jazz composition by John Coltrane

"Alabama" is a musical composition by the American jazz artist John Coltrane, first recorded in 1963 by Coltrane with McCoy Tyner, Jimmy Garrison, and Elvin Jones. Two takes from that session appear on Coltrane's 1964 album Live at Birdland. It is widely believed (Note: Music journalist Francis Davis – more than thirty-four years after Coltrane's death – stated in The New York Times that he was unable to find any corroborating evidence that Coltrane had intended for "Alabama" to be about the tragedy. (Davis; September 23, 2001)) that Coltrane conceived of and performed the composition in response to the 16th Street Baptist Church bombing on September 15, 1963—an attack by the Ku Klux Klan in Birmingham, Alabama, that killed four African-American girls: Addie Mae Collins (14), Cynthia Wesley (14), Carole Robertson (14), and Carol Denise McNair (11).

== History ==
Jazz historian Bill Cole, in his 1977 book, John Coltrane, states that Coltrane composed "Alabama" as a memorial to the four victims. The date of the first recording – November 18, 1963 – was sixty-four days after the bombing and four days before the assassination of John F. Kennedy. Cole asserts that the melodic line "was developed from the rhythmic inflections of a speech given by Dr. Martin Luther King." (Note: Journalist Matt Micucci, on November 18, 2016, stated in a Jazziz essay, that "Coltrane was inspired by Martin Luther King's speech, delivered in the church sanctuary three days after the bombing [September 18, 1963], and patterned his saxophone playing on it. Like the speech, 'Alabama' shifts its tone from one of mourning to one of renewed determination for the struggle against racially motivated crimes". (audio of MLK's speech via YouTube) (Micucci, November 18, 2016))

Coltrane, Tyner, Garrison, and Jones, again, recorded "Alabama"—along with "Afro Blue" and "Impressions" —for a 30-minute TV episode of Jazz Casual, hosted by Ralph J. Gleason. The group recorded it December 7, 1963, at KQED TV in San Francisco. The episode was broadcast February 19, 1964, on WNET TV in New York, and February 23, 1964, on KQED TV in San Francisco. The quartet had been performing a twelve-day gig at the Jazz Workshop in San Francisco, nightly, from November 26, 1963, through December 8, 1963.

=== Recording by legacies of the original artists ===
"Alabama" was one of the tracks on Jack DeJohnette's 2016 album, In Movement. The other two musicians on the album, Ravi Coltrane (saxophone) and Matthew Garrison (bass), are the sons of the musicians on the original 1963 recording. Music journalist Richard Williams pointed out that the personal connection to "Alabama" extended to DeJohnette, who not only had performed with John Coltrane, but had known Ravi and Matt since they were children. In addition, Jack is Matt's godfather and when Matt returned to the United States after living with his mother in Italy for 11 years he moved in with Jack. The trio—Jack, Ravi, and Matt—performed "Alabama" on the fifth day of the Berlin Jazz Festival, November 5, 2016 and again at a free concert in Central Park on June 16, 2019.

== Selected sessionography ==
Recording date	Artists	Takes	Notes
November 18, 1963 (afternoon) (released January 1964)	John Coltrane (tenor sax); McCoy Tyner (piano); Jimmy Garrison (bass); Elvin Jones (drums)	"Alabama" ––––––––––––––––––––: 1. Matrix; 2. 90018-1 (unissued); 3. 90018-2 (unissued); 4. 90018-3 (unissued); 5. 90018-4 Impulse! (2:42) A-50; 6. 90018-5 Impulse! (2:23) A-50; IMPD-901; 7. takes 4 & 5 Impulse! (5:05) A-50; AS-9200-2	Recorded at Van Gelder Studio, Englewood Cliffs, New Jersey
Selected session releases of the 1963 recording "Alabama" take 5 (2:22): 1. The Gentle Side Of John Coltrane; 1. Impulse! IMPD-901 (released as 2 LPs 1975); 2. Impulse! ASH-9306-2 (released as 2 LPs 1975); 3. Impulse! GRD-107 (released 1991 as a CD); 4. GRP GRD-107 (released 1991 as a CD); "Alabama" takes 4 & 5 (5:08) (audio via YouTube; take 4: 0:00–2:42; take 5: 2:45–5:02): 2. Live at Birdland; 1. Impulse! A-50 (released as an LP January 1964); 2. Impulse! IMPD-198 (released as a CD 1996); 3. The Best Of John Coltrane – His Greatest Years (released as an LP 1970); 1. Impulse! AS-9200-2; 2. ABC AS-9200-2; 4. Afro-Blue (released as an LP April 1971); 1. Probe SBP-1025; 2. ABC ABCL-5012; 5. A John Coltrane Retrospective – The Impulse! Years (released as 3 CDs 1992); 1. GRP GRD-3-119; 2. Impulse! GRD-3-119; 6. GRP GRBD-9874: John Coltrane – Priceless Jazz Collection (released as a CD 1997); 7. Impulse! IMPD8-280 (8 CDs): Coltrane – The Classic Quartet – Complete Impulse! Studio Recordings (released November 3, 1998); 8. Impulse! 314 549 913-2: The Very Best of John Coltrane (released as a CD 2001); 9. Impulse! B0010591-02 (5 CDs): John Coltrane – The Impulse! Albums: Volume Two (released 2008); 10. John Coltrane – 1963: New Directions (released as 3 CDs December 12, 2018); 1. Impulse! 0602577020186; 2. UM^{e} 0602577020186; 3. Verve 0602577020186; 4. Verve UCCI-9312/4; 5. Impulse! UCCI-9312/4; 6. UM^{e} UCCI-9312/4
October 2015 (released June 5, 2016)	Ravi Coltrane (saxophone); Matthew Garrison (bass); Jack DeJohnette (drums)	"Alabama" –––––––––––––––––––– ECM 2488	Recorded at Avatar Studios in the Hell's Kitchen neighborhood of Midtown Manhattan. Released on Jack DeJohnette's album, In Movement.

== Videography and filmography ==
- Jazz Casual, Recorded in San Francisco at KQED TV December 7, 1963. The session was broadcast February 19, 1964, on WNET TV in New York, and on February 23, 1964 on KQED TV in San Francisco. The program was "Jazz Casual" with host Ralph J. Gleason.

John Coltrane (tenor saxophone); McCoy Tyner (piano); Jimmy Garrison (bass); Elvin Jones (drums)
OCLC 62319387, 48873091, 52033321, 318274404, 473671591, 904024420.
(video via YouTube)

- Malcolm X (1992), directed by Spike Lee. The soundtrack was released as a CD December 10, 1992, on:

The film score used the fifth take from the November 18, 1963, session: matrix 90018-5

1. Quest WPCP-5094
2. Qwest Records 9 45130-2 (CD)
3. Qwest Records 9 45130-4 (cassette)
4. Reprise Records 9 45130-2 (CD)
5. Qwest Records 9362-45130-1 (LP)
6. Qwest Records WBCD 1752 (CD)
7. Reprise Records WBCD 1752 (CD)
8. BMG Direct Marketing, Inc. D 100372

OCLC 32489850 (all editions)

== See also ==
- Civil rights movement in popular culture

== Bibliography ==
=== Original copyright ===
Catalog of Copyright Entries, Third Series, Music – Current and Renewal Registrations. Library of Congress, Copyright Office.

1. Vol. 31; Part 5, No. 1, Section 2. January–June 1977 (1978). "Alabama." m. John Coltrane. 1 p. © Jowcol Music, Chicago; 5 May 1977; EU781801. p. 2313.

=== References ===
- Bailey, C. Michael (August 10, 2005). "John Coltrane: John Coltrane: Live At Birdland". All About Jazz.
- Cole, Bill (1976). John Coltrane. Schirmer Books, a division of Macmillan Publishing – via Internet Archive. LCCN 76-14289, ISBN 978-0-3068-1062-6, ISBN 0-0287-0660-9 (hardback), ISBN 0-0287-0500-9 (paperback), OCLC 680351269 (all editions).
- Davis, Francis (September 23, 2001). "Music – Coltrane at 75: the Man and the Myths". New York Times, The (print edition includes color photo). Vol. 150, no. 51885. p. 25. ISSN 0362-4331 (publication); EBSCOhost 5505233 (article).
- Lord, Tom, ed. (n.d.). "Alabama". The Jazz Discography Online (tune ID 60656). Chilliwack, British Columbia: Lord Music Reference Inc. OCLC 182585494, 690104143.
- Micucci, Matt (November 18, 2016). "Nov. 18, 1963 ... John Coltrane Records 'Alabama'". Jazziz. Boca Raton. (Michael Fagien, MD, founded Jazziz in 1983 and has been editor and publisher since).
- Muhammad, Ismail (June 17, 2020). "On John Coltrane's 'Alabama'". The Paris Review. ISSN 0031-2037.
- Stucky, Rami Toubia (2013). "Rhythm, Rage, and Restraint: The Music of Nina Simone and John Coltrane on the Birmingham Bombing" (PDF) (honors student academic paper). Brunswick, Maine: Bowdoin College, Africana Studies.
- Williams, Richard (November 7, 2016). "Coltrane's 'Alabama' in the Time of Trump". thebluemoment.com (essay). A blog about music by Richard Williams.
