= Jungle Suite =

Studio album by Bola Sete
- Released: 1985
- Recorded: July 17, 1982 at Different Fur Recording, San Francisco, California
- Genre: Samba, jazz
- Length: 33:26 (vinyl edition); 41:30 (CD edition)
- Label: Dancing Cat
- Producer: George Winston

Bola Sete chronology
Ocean (1975)	Jungle Suite (1985)	Ocean Memories (1999)

Jungle Suite is an album by Brazilian guitarist Bola Sete, released in 1985 through Dancing Cat Records. Recorded in 1982, it is the only known recording of Sete playing a steel-string acoustic guitar. Jungle Suite was his final album before his death from lung cancer in 1987.

== Release and reception ==
Professional ratings
Review scores
Source	Rating
AllMusic	4.5/5 stars

AllMusic critic Thom Jurek noted that Sete's "fusion of Brazilian, classical, flamenco, jazz, and numerous folk styles was unprecedented and remains unmatched." He declared the sessions "among the most inspired examples of passionate and technically brilliant guitar playing in the recorded history of the instrument."

== Track listing ==
All tracks are written by Bola Sete

Side one
No.	Title	Length
1.	"The Sun Pours Through The Darkness Gently, Gently"	5:49
2.	"Moonbeams, Moonlight, Midnight Magic"	8:56
3.	"Morning Rises Through the Mist"	3:06

Side two
No.	Title	Length
1.	"Night Shadows"	4:47
2.	"Scorcerers, Spirits, Devas And Delights"	4:10
3.	"Many Shades Of Green"	4:15
4.	"Devas Lament"	2:23

CD Version
No.	Title	Length
1.	"The Sun Pours Through The Darkness Gently, Gently"	5:51
2.	"Moonbeams, Moonlight, Midnight Magic"	9:07
3.	"Morning Rises Through the Mist"	3:13
4.	"Night Shadows"	4:58
5.	"Scorcerers, Spirits, Devas And Delights"	4:21
6.	"Shambhala Moon"	6:09
7.	"Many Shades Of Green"	4:17
8.	"Devas Lament"	3:34

== Release history ==
Country	Date	Label	Format	Catalogue number
United States	1985	Dancing Cat	LP	DC-3005
United States	2001	Samba Moon	CD	1190554

== Personnel ==
- Bola Sete – steel-string acoustic guitar
- George Winston – production
