= Tour de Force (Bola Sete album) =

Studio album by Bola Sete
- Released: 1963
- Recorded: June 18, 1963 at Coast Recorders, San Francisco, CA
- Genre: Samba, jazz
- Length: 35:40
- Label: Fantasy

Bola Sete chronology
Vince Guaraldi, Bola Sete and Friends (1963)	Tour de Force (1963)	From All Sides (1964)

Tour de Force is an album by Brazilian guitarist Bola Sete, released in 1963 through Fantasy Records.

== Release and reception ==
Professional ratings
Review scores
Source	Rating
Allmusic	4.5/5 stars

Richie Unterberger of allmusic gave the album four and a half out of five stars, calling it "quality by-the-fire jazz bossa nova music."

In 2001, Tour de Force was issued on CD coupled with Bossa Nova on a compilation titled after the former.

== Track listing ==
All tracks are written by Bola Sete, except where noted

Side one
No.	Title	Writer(s)	Length
1.	"Baccara (Baccarat)"		3:37
2.	"Moon River"	Mancini, Mercer	2:58
3.	"Mambeando"		3:15
4.	"Céu e Mar"		3:30
5.	"Asturias"	Albéniz	4:40

Side two
No.	Title	Writer(s)	Length
1.	"Samba de Orpheus"	Bonfá, Salvet	3:12
2.	"Sad Note"		2:10
3.	"Tour de Force"	Gillespie	4:48
4.	"A Noite do Meu Bem"	Duran	4:00
5.	"Bourrée"	Bach	3:23

== Personnel ==
- Johnny Rae – drums
- Freddie Schreiber – bass guitar
- Bola Sete – guitar

== Release history ==
Country	Date	Label	Format	Catalogue number
United States	1963	Fantasy	mono LP	3358
United States	1963	Fantasy	stereo LP	8358
