= Woody Herman–1963 =

Studio album by Woody Herman
- Released: December 1962
- Recorded: October 15–16, 1962
- Genre: Jazz
- Length: 37:12
- Label: Philips (PHM 200-065)
- Producer: Jack Tracy

Woody Herman chronology
The New Swingin' Herman Herd (1960)	Woody Herman–1963 (1962)	Encore (1963)

Woody Herman–1963 is a 1962 studio album by Woody Herman and his big band. The album peaked at 136 on the Billboard 200.

== Reception ==
Professional ratings
Review scores
Source	Rating
AllMusic	4/5 stars
The Penguin Guide to Jazz Recordings	3.5/4 stars

Ken Dryden reviewed the album for AllMusic, writing that "While this is hardly 'the Swingin'est Big Band Ever,' as hyped ... this 1963 edition of Woody Herman's big band is a strong one, with an emphasis on well-constructed blues charts. The only letdown of the date is Herman's throwaway vocal chorus in Chase's 'Camel Walk,' which follows the leader's potent clarinet solo". Dryden praised Sal Nistico's performance on "Sister Sadie" and Phil Wilson's solos on "Don't Get Around Much Anymore" and "It's a Lonesome Old Town (When You're Not Around)".

== Track listing ==
1. "Mo-Lasses" (Joe Newman) – 6:45
2. "Blues for J.P." (Horace Parlan) – 3:33
3. "Don't Get Around Much Anymore" (Duke Ellington, Bob Russell) – 4:21
4. "Tunin' In" (Nat Pierce) – 4:20
5. "Sister Sadie" (Horace Silver) – 3:30
6. "Sig Ep" (Jack Gale) – 3:53
7. "It's a Lonesome Old Town (When You're Not Around)" (Charles Kisco, Harry Tobias, Egbert Van Alstyne) – 3:05
8. " Camel Walk" (Bill Chase) – 8:14

== Personnel ==
Musicians

- Woody Herman – clarinet, conductor, vocals on "Camel Walk"
- Sal Nistico, Gordon Brisker, Larry Cavelli – tenor saxophone
- Gene Allen – baritone saxophone
- Bill Chase – lead trumpet, arranger
- Paul Fontaine, Dave Gale, Ziggy Harrell, Gerald Lamy – trumpet
- Phil Wilson, Eddie Morgan – trombone
- Jack Gale – trombone, arranger
- Nat Pierce – piano, arranger
- Chuck Andrus – double bass
- Jake Hanna – drums

Technical

- Hollis King – art direction
- Isabelle Wong – design
- Ken Druker – executive producer
- Ralph J. Gleason – liner notes
- Jeff Willens – mastering
- Jack Tracy – producer
- Bryan Koniarz – reissue producer
- Mark Smith – reissue production assistant
