= The Incomparable Bola Sete =

Studio album by Bola Sete
- Released: 1964
- Genre: Samba, jazz
- Length: 32:51
- Label: Fantasy

Bola Sete chronology
From All Sides (1964)	The Incomparable Bola Sete (1964)	The Solo Guitar of Bola Sete (1965)

Professional ratings
Review scores
Source	Rating
Allmusic	4.5/5 stars

The Incomparable Bola Sete is an album by Brazilian guitarist Bola Sete, released in 1964 through Fantasy Records. In 2004, it was reissued on CD on the anthology Voodoo Village.

== Track listing ==
All tracks are written by Bola Sete, except where noted

Side one
No.	Title	Writer(s)	Length
1.	"Bolido"		3:50
2.	"Lamento De Negro"		3:38
3.	"Influenca Do Jazz"	Lira	2:37
4.	"Voodoo Village"	Rosa, Vadico	3:38
5.	"Sarava"	Konrad, Sete	3:12

Side two
No.	Title	Writer(s)	Length
1.	"Be-Bossa"		2:00
2.	"Waltz Of The City"	Netto, Maria	4:40
3.	"Just Another Love"		2:58
4.	"The Girl From Lodi"		3:15
5.	"Original Joe's"		3:13

== Release history ==
Country	Date	Label	Format	Catalogue number
United States	1964	Fantasy	mono LP	3364
United States	1964	Fantasy	stereo LP	8364

== Personnel ==
- Monty Budwig – bass
- Paul Horn – flute
- Nick Martinez – drums
- Johnny Rae – drums
- Bola Sete – guitar
