= Larry Porter (musician) =

American jazz musician and composer (born 1951)

- Born: September 1, 1951 (age 74); Cleveland, Ohio, U.S.
- Genres: Jazz, classical, Indian classical music
- Occupation: Musician
- Instruments: Piano, Rebab, Sarod

Lawrence "Larry" Stephen Porter (September 1, 1951) is an American jazz musician and composer.

== Early life and education ==
Porter began to take piano lessons when he was six years old. He began his education at the Eastman School of Music and continued his studies at the Berklee College of Music. At college, he founded the group Children at Play with Tom van der Geld in 1971.

== Career ==
From 1973 to 1976, Porter lived in Germany and worked with Bobby Jones, Volker Kriegel, Kai Winding, Mel Lewis, Günter Lenz and Head, Heart & Hands. Together with Frank St. Peter and Allex Bally, he led the group Music Community, in which Lee Harper, Leszek Żądło, Rudi Fuesers and Hermann Breuer performed. The group participated in numerous jazz festivals in Europe. In a study trip in India and Afghanistan, he learned to play Sarod and Rubab with Mohammad Omar. Afterward, he was active in the field of jazz as well as with Hindi musicians or as the companion of Merce Cunningham and other dancers in New York City until 1980.

In 1981, he moved to Munich and worked with Bobby Stern, Frank St. Peter, Airto Moreira, Albert Mangelsdorff, Heinz Sauer and Sal Nistico. After a stay in Spain, where there was a seminar with Thad Jones, he led a quartet along with Allan Praskin from 1984. The quartet presented the albums like First Date (1984) and Acoustic Music (1985). He performed also in a trio with Detlef Beier and Thomas Cremer. From 1986 to 1988, he was on several tours with Chet Baker. From 1988 to 1992, he was in Art Farmer's band and in 1991 and 1992 with Archie Shepp and also with Marty Cook and Monty Waters. From 1994 to 2000, he worked again in New York. Since then, Porter has lived and worked in Berlin. In Berlin, he was in a trio along with Johannes Fink and Oliver Steidle (CD, Circle is unbroken) and in a quartet with Wilson de Oliveira and also in Christian Grabant quintet.

Porter has played with Hannibal Lokumbe, Embryo, Benny Bailey, Leo Wright, Al Cohn, Jim Pepper, Sheila Jordan, Jay Clayton, and Rachel Gould.

Porter also played in an album with traditional Afghan music (The magical Rebab of Larry Porter). In addition, he composed a string quartet (1989) and music for ballet (1991). In 2004, he composed for the horn players of the Berlin Philharmonic the Kind of Jazz Suite.
