= Goin' to Rio =

Studio album by Bola Sete
- Released: 1973
- Recorded: 1972
- Genre: Samba, jazz
- Length: 37:55
- Label: Columbia
- Producer: Bola Sete

Bola Sete chronology
Shebaba (1971)	Goin' to Rio (1973)	Ocean (1975)

Goin' to Rio is an album by Brazilian guitarist Bola Sete, released in 1973 through Columbia Records. In 2011, it was released as "Crystal Garden" accompanied by additional tracks from the same recording sessions.

== Track listing ==
All tracks are written by Bola Sete.

Side one
No.	Title	Length
1.	"Goin' to Rio"	3:15
2.	"Dance of the Jungle"	2:50
3.	"Waking Giant"	2:10
4.	"Serenade"	3:09
5.	"Pretty Afternoon"	2:52
6.	"Brazilian Soul"	3:35

Side two
No.	Title	Length
1.	"Sunrise in Manaus"	3:15
2.	"Meu Ogum"	5:42
3.	"I See Your Face"	3:34
4.	"Dance of the Bamboo"	2:07
5.	"Rain Forest"	3:27
6.	"Folk Guitar"	2:59

== Release history ==
Country	Date	Label	Format	Catalogue number
United States	1973	Columbia	LP	KC 32375
United States	2011	CD Baby	CD	65304

== Personnel ==
- Milt Rogers – string arrangement
- Bola Sete – guitar, string arrangement, production
