= Ocean (Bola Sete album) =

Studio album by Bola Sete
- Released: 1975
- Recorded: 1972
- Genre: Samba, jazz
- Length: 40:43
- Label: Takoma
- Producer: Doug Decker, John Fahey

Bola Sete chronology
Goin' to Rio (1973)	Ocean (1975)	Jungle Suite (1985)

Ocean is an album by Brazilian guitarist Bola Sete, released in 1975 through Takoma Records.

== Release and reception ==
Professional ratings
Review scores
Source	Rating
Allmusic	4/5 stars

allmusic critic Brandon Burke praised the sombre mood of the record, asserting that "more traditional numbers like the opener, "Vira Mundo Penba," take on a sadness that goes beyond what most people understand about Brazilian "saudade," while "Macumba" is just downright dark." He gave Ocean a four out of five, saying that it has "a depth not found in the majority of his catalog."

== Track listing ==
All tracks are written by Bola Sete, except where noted

Side one
No.	Title	Writer(s)	Length
1.	"Vira Mundo Penba"		4:11
2.	"Guitar Lamento"		4:39
3.	"Let Go"	Powell	4:36
4.	"Macumba"		3:37
5.	"The Lonely Gaucho in the Pampas Awaiting the Advent of Christmas"		2:27
6.	"Inn of the Beginning, Cotati"		2:24

Side two
No.	Title	Writer(s)	Length
1.	"Xengo Xengo Xererengo"		2:36
2.	"Ocean Waves"	Caymmi	8:47
3.	"O Astronauta"	Moraes, Powell	2:58
4.	"Black Mommy"	Chargas, Martius	4:28

== Personnel ==
- Anne Ackerman – illustrations
- Doug Decker – production, mixing
- John Fahey – production
- David Kulka – mastering
- Frans Lanting – photography
- Bola Sete – guitar
- Jim Stern – recording
- Val Valentin – engineering

== Release history ==
Country	Date	Label	Format	Catalogue number
United States	1975	Takoma	LP	C-1049
United Kingdom	1976	Sonet	LP	SNTF 695
United States	1981	Lost Lake Arts	LP	LL-82
