= Snake Rag =

Composition by King Oliver
- Written: April 6, 1923
- Genre: Dixieland
- Composer: King Oliver

Snake Rag is a 1923 Dixieland jazz standard composed by Joseph "King" Oliver of King Oliver's Creole Jazz Band. It features Oliver and Louis Armstrong on cornet, Honoré Dutrey on trombone, Johnny Dodds on clarinet, Lil Hardin on piano, Baby Dodds on drums, and William Manuel Johnson on banjo. The rag was a result of improvisation during a session at Richmond, Indiana on April 6, 1923.

The rag is known for its "trick breaks and animal noises", recalling "crows cawing and swans trumpeting". Many breaks of the cornets are chromatic. Beside this, although the piece is not typical ragtime in melody and rhythm, it has the long structure of many ragtime compositions: A (16 measures in Eb); B (16 measures in Eb); A (16 measures in Eb); C, C, C (in Ab). In 1959, Armstrong released an album of the same name featuring Snake Rag as the first track and others including "I Want a Big Butter and Egg Man" and "Jelly Roll Blues".
