= Workin' on a Groovy Thing (Bola Sete album) =

Studio album by Bola Sete
- Released: 1970
- Genre: Soul, bossa nova
- Length: 29:58
- Label: Paramount
- Producer: Tom Mack

Bola Sete chronology
Bola Sete at the Monterey Jazz Festival (1967)	Workin' on a Groovy Thing (1970)	Shebaba (1971)

Workin' on a Groovy Thing is an album by Brazilian guitarist Bola Sete, released in 1970 through Paramount Records. It contains "Bettina", which has been sampled by popular artists such as Lovage, Destiny's Child and A Tribe Called Quest.

== Track listing ==
Side one
No.	Title	Writer(s)	Length
1.	"Workin' On a Groovy Thing"	Atkins, Sedaka	2:13
2.	"Little Green Apples"	Russell	3:13
3.	"Don't Leave Me"	Nilsson	2:49
4.	"Without Her"	Nilsson	2:29
5.	"Bettina"	Sete	3:12
6.	"Golden Slumbers/Carry That Weight"	Lennon-McCartney	2:28

Side two
No.	Title	Writer(s)	Length
1.	"With a Little Help from My Friends"	Lennon-McCartney	2:57
2.	"Tuei"	Sete	2:46
3.	"Wedding Bell Blues"	Nyro	2:06
4.	"Suite: Judy Blue Eyes"	Stills	3:15
5.	"Both Sides, Now"	Mitchell	2:30

== Personnel ==
Musicians

- José Marino – bass guitar
- Frank Obligacion – congas
- Bola Sete – acoustic guitar
- Claudio Slon – drums

Production and additional personnel

- Hank Cicalo – engineering
- Tom Mack – production
- Rusty Miller – photography
- Milt Rogers – string arrangement on "Don't Leave Me", "Bettina" and "Tuei"
- Christopher Whorf – design

== Release history ==
Country	Date	Label	Format	Catalogue number
United States	1970	Paramount	LP	PAS-5011
