= Shebaba =

Studio album by Bola Sete
- Released: 1971
- Genres: Samba, jazz
- Length: 39:33
- Label: Fantasy
- Producers: Jim Stern, Bola Sete

Bola Sete chronology
Workin' on a Groovy Thing (1970)	Shebaba (1971)	Goin' to Rio (1973)

Shebaba is an album by Brazilian guitarist Bola Sete, released in 1971 through Fantasy Records. It was his final album for Fastasy and has yet to be issued on CD.

== Track listing ==
All tracks composed by Bola Sete; except where noted.

Side one
No.	Title	Writer(s)	Length
1.	"Shebaba"		3:38
2.	"Complicado"		3:44
3.	"Bola Beat"		3:47
4.	"Polythene Pam/She Came in Through the Bathroom Window"	John Lennon, Paul McCartney	6:00
5.	"Roda"	Gilberto Gil, João Augusto	3:47

Side two
No.	Title	Writer(s)	Length
1.	"It's Gonna Change"		3:28
2.	"Melossa"		3:10
3.	"Baccara"		2:29
4.	"My Sweet Lord"	George Harrison	5:15
5.	"Street Market"		4:15

== Release history ==
Country	Date	Label	Format	Catalogue number
United States	1971	Fantasy	LP	8417

== Personnel ==
- Ed Bogas – violin
- Hadley Caliman – tenor saxophone
- Dwight Dickerson – keyboards
- Luis Gasca – trumpet, flugelhorn
- Terrance Laine – congas, percussion
- Jose Marino – bass guitar, percussion
- Ronald Mesquita – drums, percussion
- Larry Patterson – backing vocals
- Nathan Rubin – violin
- Bola Sete – 13-string lute, electric guitar, percussion, vocals
- James Wilcots – backing vocals
- Josef Williams – backing vocals
- Lenny Williams – vocals

Technical

- Pete Turner – front cover photography
