= Bola Sete =

Brazilian guitarist (1923–1987)

Background information
- Born: Djalma de Andrade; July 16, 1923; Rio de Janeiro, Brazil
- Died: February 14, 1987 (aged 63) Greenbrae, California, U.S.
- Genres: Bossa nova, samba, jazz
- Occupations: Musician, composer
- Instrument: Guitar
- Years active: 1952–1987
- Labels: Fantasy, Takoma, Puchito

Bola Sete (born Djalma de Andrade; July 16, 1923 – February 14, 1987) was a Brazilian guitarist known for playing jazz with Vince Guaraldi and Dizzy Gillespie.

== Biography ==
=== Early life ===
Born Djalma de Andrade in Rio de Janeiro, Sete was the only son of a family with seven children. His nickname means "Seven Ball". In snooker, which is fairly popular in Brazil, the seven ball is the only black ball on the table (like the eight ball in pool). Bola got this nickname when he was the only black member of a small jazz group.

Sete's family were poor and often struggled with finding food. Every member of the family played a musical instrument and would often play together. Sete first began playing music when he found a Cavaquinho in his home. With the help of his Uncle, he taught himself to play and eventually got his own instrument. For Christmas in 1932, he was gifted his first guitar.

At age 10, Sete was fostered by an affluent married couple who sent him to school and introduced him to classical music. He later began performing in a semi-professional group that played Brazilian folk music and samba. When World War II started, Sete's foster parents sent him into hiding in the Brazilian interior to avoid military conscription. He returned to Rio after the end of the war.

=== Education and influence ===
Sete's foster parents wanted him to pursue a career in law, but he was set on becoming a musician and began studying guitar at the National School of Music in Rio. He then moved to a conservatory in São Paulo where the guitar teachers were superior.

=== Career ===
His career broadened between 1952 and '58 when he played clubs and hotels in Italy. He then returned to Brazil and started touring throughout South America, during which time the manager of Sheraton Hotels noticed him and brought him to the US to play in the hotels. He played in New York's Park Sheraton, then moved to San Francisco to play in the Sheraton Palace. Dizzy Gillespie was staying there at the time and heard Sete playing every day. When Gillespie brought his pianist, Lalo Schifrin, to the hotel, he discovered that Schifrin and Sete had played together in Argentina. This meeting was the beginning of Sete's success in the US. In the fall of 1962, Gillespie took Sete to the Monterey Jazz Festival, where he enjoyed a huge reception.

Sete toured with Gillespie, then returned to San Francisco, where he joined the Vince Guaraldi trio. He became well known in the US, and his partnership with Guaraldi yielded several well-received recordings. After staying for a couple of years with Guaraldi, Sete formed his own trio with Sebastião Neto on bass and Paulinho Magalhães on drums. He appeared at the Monterey Jazz Festival in 1966 with this trio and released an album of his performance, Bola Sete at the Monterey Jazz Festival, which peaked at No. 20 on the Billboard Jazz chart.

After a two year retirement, Sete returned to music in 1971. He often played a 13-stringed instrument he devised himself called the "lutar". The instrument was based on a Brazilian folk instrument, the alaude, which has ten strings grouped in five sets of double strings. The lutar had six sets of double strings and a single string.

In the 1970s, Sete became friends with guitarist John Fahey, who had been an admirer.

== Death ==
During the 1980s, Sete suffered from lung cancer, which he attempted to improve with yoga and meditation. On February 14, 1987, he died at Marin General Hospital in Greenbrae, California of complications caused by pneumonia and cancer.

The compositions he recorded shortly before his death were compiled and released as Windspell in 2008.

== Discography ==
=== As leader ===
- Aqui está o Bola Sete (Parlophone and Cornbread, 1957)
- Bola Sete e 4 trombones (Odeon, 1958)
- Travessuras do Bola Sete (Odeon, 1958)
- Ritmolândia (Odeon, 1958)
- Carnival in Rio (Puchito, 1958)
- Bola Sete em Hi-Fi (1958)
- É a Bola da Vez (Odeon, 1959)
- O Extraordinario Bola Sete (Odeon, 1962)
- Bossa Nova (Fantasy, 1962)
- Tour de Force (Fantasy, 1963)
- The Incomparable Bola Sete (1965)
- The Solo Guitar of Bola Sete (Fantasy, 1965)
- Autentico! (Fantasy, 1966)
- Bola Sete at the Monterey Jazz Festival (Verve, 1967)
- Workin' on a Groovy Thing (Paramount, 1970)
- Shebaba (Fantasy, 1971)
- Goin' to Rio (Columbia, 1973)
- Ocean (Takoma, 1975)
- Jungle Suite (Dancing Cat, 1985)
- Live at Grace Cathedral (Samba Moon, 2003)
- The Kitchen Tapes (2014)
- Samba in Seattle : Live at the Penthouse 1966-1968 (Tompkins Square, 2021)

With Vince Guaraldi

- Vince Guaraldi, Bola Sete and Friends (Fantasy, 1963)
- From All Sides (Fantasy, 1964)
- Live at El Matador (Fantasy, 1966)
- Jazz Casual: Paul Winter/Bola Sete and Vince Guaraldi (Koch, 2001)
- The Navy Swings (V.A.G. Publishing, 2010)

=== As sideman ===
- Dizzy Gillespie, New Wave (Philips, 1963)
