= Chuck Andrus =

American jazz double-bassist (1928–1997)

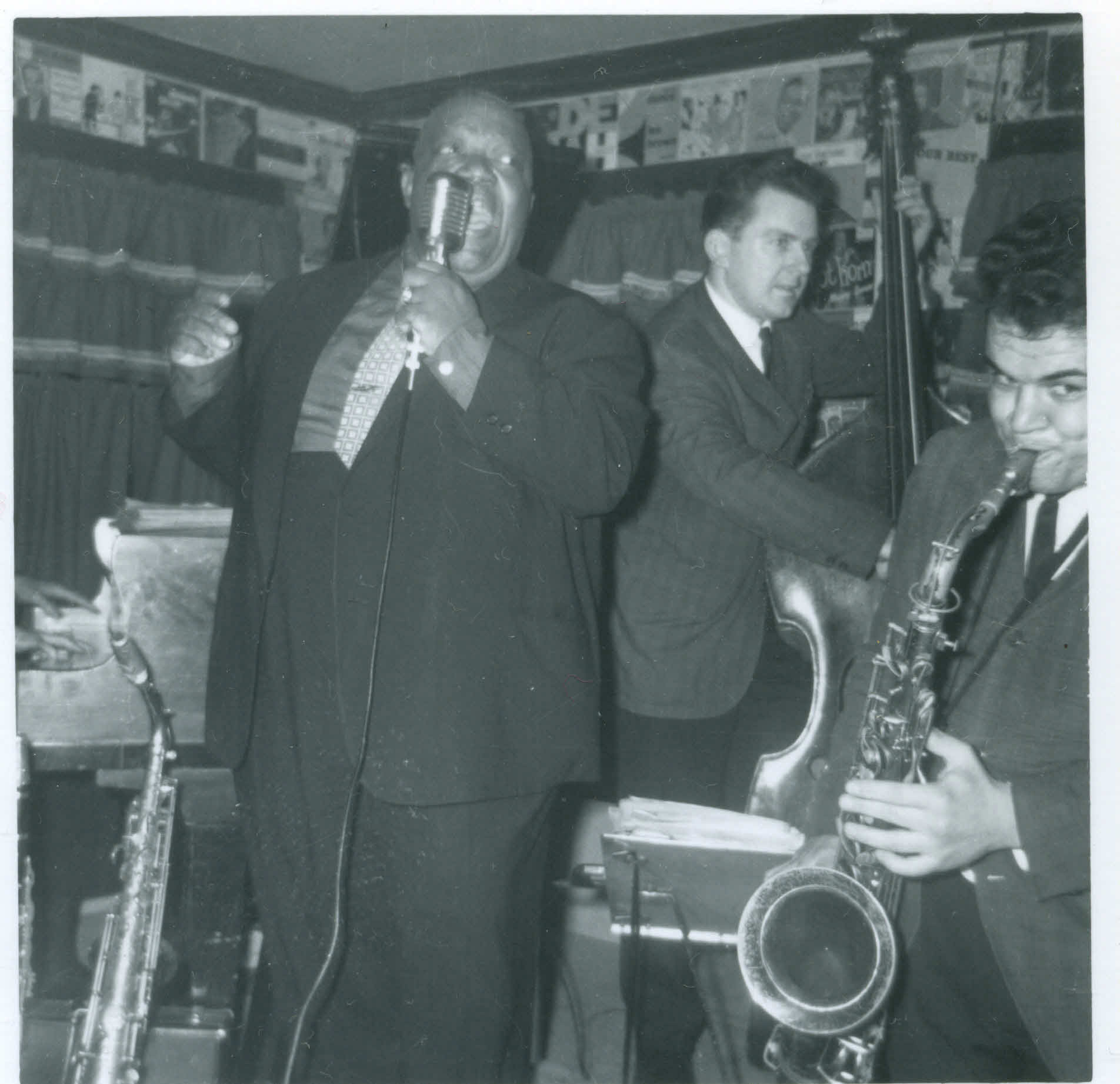
- Andrus with the Woody Herman band at Lennie's on the Turnpike, 1964

Background information
- Born: Charles Edmund Andrus Jr. November 17, 1928; Holyoke, Massachusetts, U.S.
- Died: June 12, 1997 (aged 68) Boca Raton, Florida, U.S.
- Genres: Jazz
- Occupation: Musician
- Instrument: Double bass
- Years active: 1940s–1997
- Formerly of: Woody Herman Herd

Charles Edmund Andrus Jr. (November 17, 1928 – June 12, 1997), best known as Chuck Andrus, was an American jazz double bassist.

== Biography ==
Andrus was born in Holyoke, Massachusetts, raised in New England, and studied at the Manhattan School of Music. In the late 1940s, he formed his own ensemble in Springfield, Massachusetts, which included Sal Salvador and Phil Woods. He played with Charlie Barnet in 1953, then with Claude Thornhill through the middle of the decade. While with Thornhill, he met Terry Gibbs, and the two frequently played and recorded together in subsequent years. He also recorded extensively with Woody Herman, joining his reformed big band (dubbed the "Swinging Herd"), beginning in 1962. However, Andrus left the group in 1965 to pursue a freelance career in New York. There, he worked with musicians including Don Stratton, Bernard Peiffer, and Jim Chapin.

Andrus's trio played at the White House for President Lyndon B. Johnson; in the spring of 1968, they returned to perform for the Ambassadors' Ball.

Andrus served in the 40th Division Army Band in the Korean War.

Returning to his hometown of Holyoke, he worked in a law office until his retirement; nonetheless, he continued to perform professionally. In 1993, he moved to Florida. He played regularly at the Governor's Club in Palm Beach until his death.

== Personal life and death ==
Andrus was married twice and had two daughters. He married his second wife, Elaine, in 1994.

He died in Boca Raton, Florida, on June 12, 1997, aged 68.

== Discography ==
With Woody Herman

- Swing Low, Sweet Clarinet (Philips, 1962)
- Woody Herman–1963 (Philips, 1963)
- 1963: The Swingin'est Big Band Ever (Philips, 1963)
- Encore (Philips, 1963)
- My Kind of Broadway (Columbia, 1964)
- The Swinging Herman Herd-Recorded Live (Philips, 1964)
- Woody Herman: 1964 (Philips, 1964)
- Woody's Big Band Goodies (Philips, 1965)
- 1963 Live Guard Sessions (Jazz Band, 1991)
- Live in Stereo 1963 Summer Tour (Jazz Hour, 1991)

With others

- Jim Chapin, The Jim Chapin Sextet (Classic Jazz, 1977)
- Herbie Mann, Early Mann (Bethlehem, 1957–1959 [1975])
- Bernard Peiffer, Bernie's Tunes (EmArcy, 1956)
