= Bill Chase =

American jazz trumpeter (1934–1974)

- Born: William Edward Chiaiese; October 20, 1934; Squantum, Massachusetts, U.S.
- Died: August 9, 1974 (aged 39) Jackson, Minnesota
- Genres: Jazz rock, swing
- Occupation: Musician
- Instrument: Trumpet
- Formerly of: Chase

Bill Chase (October 20, 1934 – August 9, 1974) was an American trumpeter and leader of the jazz-rock band Chase.

== Biography ==
Bill Chase was born William Edward Chiaiese on October 20, 1934, to an Italian-American family in Squantum, Massachusetts. His parents changed their name to Chase because they thought Chiaiese was difficult to pronounce. His father played trumpet in the Gillette Marching Band and encouraged his son's musical interests, which included violin and drums. In his mid-teens he settled on trumpet. Chase attended his first Stan Kenton concert, which included trumpeters Conte Candoli and Maynard Ferguson.

After graduating from high school, he studied classical trumpet at the New England Conservatory but switched to the Schillinger House of Music (Berklee College of Music). His instructors included Herb Pomeroy and Armando Ghitalla.

Chase played lead trumpet with Maynard Ferguson in 1958, Stan Kenton in 1959, and Woody Herman's Thundering Herd during the 1960s.

One of Chase's charts from this period, "Camel Walk", was published in the 1963 Downbeat magazine yearbook. From 1966 to 1970, he freelanced in Las Vegas, working with Vic Damone and Tommy Vig. In 1967 he led a six-piece band at the Dunes and Riviera Hotel where he was featured in the Frederick Apcar lounge production of Vive Les Girls, for which Chase arranged the music.

"Get It On"
Sample from "Get It On" from the album Chase

In 1971, he started a jazz rock band named "Chase" that mixed pop, rock, blues, and four trumpets. The debut album Chase was released in April 1971. Chase was joined by Ted Piercefield, Alan Ware, and Jerry Van Blair, three jazz trumpeters who were adept at vocals and arranging. They were backed up by a rhythm section consisting of Phil Porter on keyboards, Angel South on guitar, Dennis Johnson on bass, and John "Jay Burrid" Mitthaur on percussion. Rounding out the group was Terry Richards, who was the lead vocalist on the first album. The album contains Chase's most popular song, "Get It On", released as a single that spent 13 weeks on the charts beginning in May 1971. The song features what Jim Szantor of Downbeat magazine called "the hallmark of the Chase brass—complex cascading lines; a literal waterfall of trumpet timbre and technique." The band received a Best New Artist Grammy nomination, but was edged out by rising star Carly Simon.

Chase released their second album, Ennea, in March 1972; the album's title is the Greek word for nine, a reference to the nine band members. The original lineup changed midway through the recording sessions, with Gary Smith taking over on drums and G. G. Shinn replacing Terry Richards on lead vocals. The third album, Pure Music, moved the band toward jazz. Two of the songs were written or co-written by Jim Peterik of the Ides of March, who also sings on the album, along with singer and bassist Dartanyan Brown.

== Plane crash ==
Chase's work on a fourth studio album in mid-1974 came to an end on August 9, 1974. While en route to a scheduled performance at the Jackson County Fair, Chase died in the crash of a chartered twin-engine Piper Twin Comanche in Jackson, Minnesota, at the age of 39. The pilot and co-pilot were killed, as were keyboardist Wally Yohn, guitarist John Emma, and drummer Walter Clark.

== Methodology ==
Chase encouraged long tones as an exercise for developing the embouchure and attributed much of his ability in the upper register of the trumpet to this practice. He was also physically fit. He lifted weights and used stretching routines he learned from female dancers in the Latin Quarter of New York City.

== Discography ==
- Chase (Epic, 1971)
- Ennea (Epic, 1972)
- Pure Music (Epic, 1974)
- Live Forever (The Hallmark Chase Group, 1998)
- The Concert Series Volume 1 (The Hallmark Chase Group 2001)
- The Concert Series Volume 2 (The Hallmark Chase Group 2001)
- The Concert Series Volume 3 (The Hallmark Chase Group 2001)

== As sideman ==
With Maynard Ferguson

- Swingin' My Way Through College (Roulette, 1959)
- Maynard Ferguson Plays Jazz for Dancing (1959)
- Maynard '64 (Roulette, 1963)
- A Message from Newport (Roulette, 1972)

With Woody Herman

- At the Monterey Jazz Festival (Atlantic, 1960)
- The New Swingin' Herman Herd (Crown, 1960)
- The New World of Woody Herman (Jazz Legacy)
- Encore (Philips, 1963)
- The Swingin'est Big Band Ever (Philips, 1963)
- Woody Herman–1963 (Phillips, 1963)
- The Swinging Herman Herd-Recorded Live (Philips, 1964)
- My Kind of Broadway (Columbia, 1964)
- Woody Herman: 1964 (Philips, 1964)
- Woody's Big Band Goodies (Philips, 1965)
- Woody's Winners (Columbia, 1965)
- The Jazz Swinger (Columbia, 1966)
- Woody Live East and West (Columbia, 1967)
- The Magpie (Atlantic, 1967)
- Heavy Exposure (Cadet, 1969)
- Double Exposure (Chess, 1976)
- Live in Antibes 1965 (France's Concert, 1988)
- Live in Seattle (Moon, 1989)
- Blue Flame (Lester, 1991)
- Live in Stereo 1963 Summer Tour (Jazz Hour, 1991)
- Live Guard Sessions with Sarah Vaughan (Jazz Band, 1991)

With Stan Kenton

- Standards in Silhouette (Capitol, 1960)
- Viva Kenton! (Capitol, 1960)
- Live at Barstow 1960 (Status, 1994)

== Other sources ==
- Szantor, Jim, Downbeat magazine, articles of February 4, 1971, and February 3, 1972.
- "New Acts" column, Variety magazine, March 13, 1974.
- "Obituaries" column, Billboard magazine, August 31, 1974.
