= Phil Wilson (trombonist) =

American jazz trombonist, arranger, and teacher

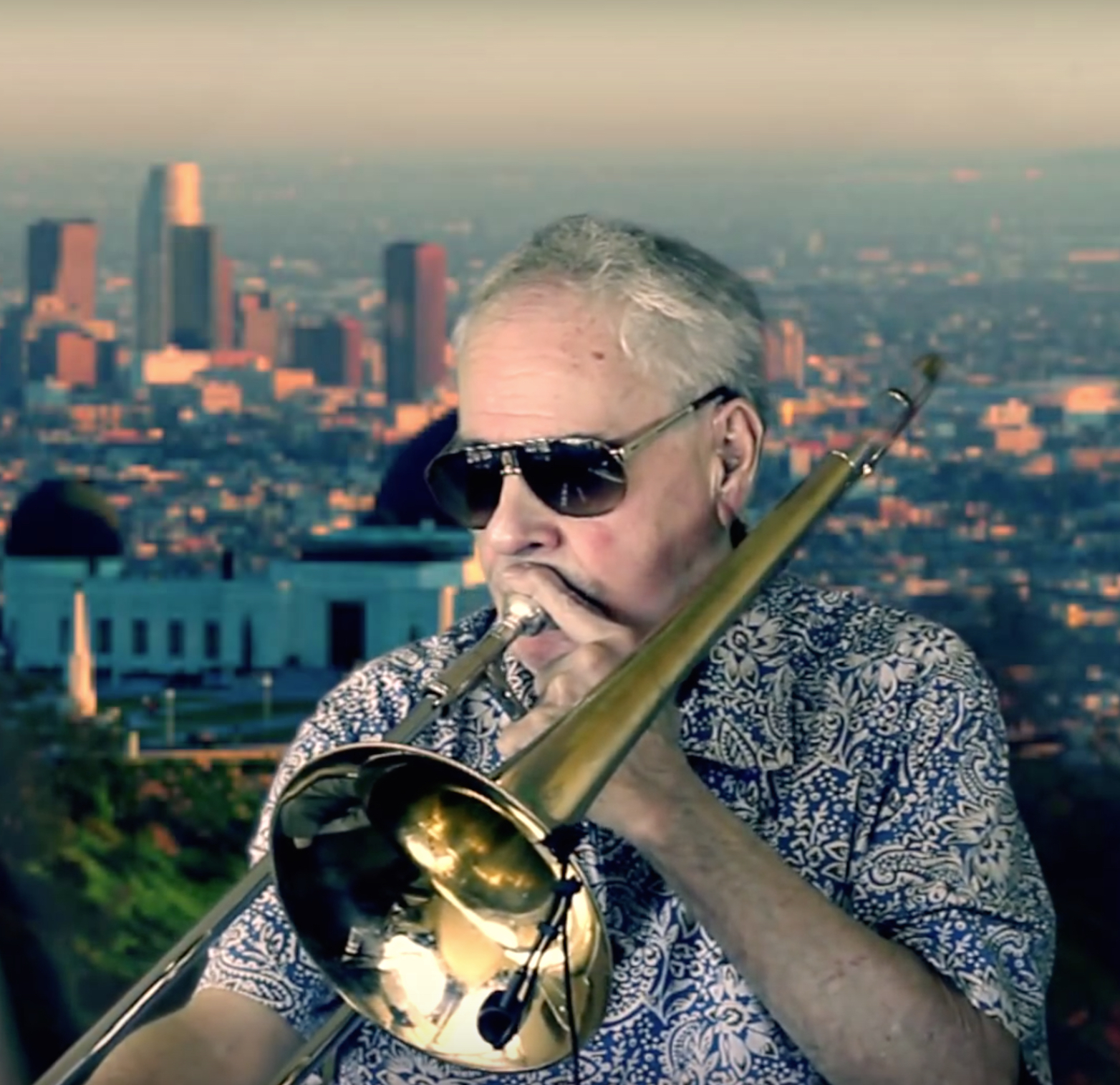

Background information
- Born: Phillips Elder Wilson Jr. January 19, 1937 (age 89); Belmont, Massachusetts, U.S.
- Genre: Jazz
- Occupations: Musician, composer, educator
- Instrument: Trombone
- Years active: 1950–present
- Label
- Military service
- Allegiance: United States
- Branch: United States Army
- Service years: 1960–1963
- Unit: NORAD Joint Forces Band

Phillips Elder Wilson, Jr. (born January 19, 1937) is a jazz trombonist, arranger, and teacher. He has taught at the Berklee College of Music and the New England Conservatory of Music. He attended Phillips Exeter Academy and New England Conservatory.

== Career ==
He began on piano but was advised to switch to trombone due to his having a mild form of dyslexia. This condition did not hamper his music, and by fifteen he had turned professional. He played for Herb Pomeroy's band from 1955 to 1957 and then toured with the Dorsey Brothers. In 1960 he was drafted into the U.S. Army and served on NORAD Band. Later, he worked with Woody Herman and in the 1960s wrote music for Buddy Rich. He formed an ensemble that became one of the most well-regarded college jazz bands.

Wilson played with Louis Armstrong at the 1964 Grammy Awards.

His arrangement of "Mercy, Mercy, Mercy" for Buddy Rich received a Grammy Award nomination.

The City of Boston proclaimed December 9, 1995 Phil Wilson Day for his contributions to jazz education.

In April 2004, Wilson was awarded an Honorary Doctorate of Music from Berklee College of Music during the 40th anniversary celebration of his Rainbow Band.

In 2014, Wilson created an online video series with Paul The Trombonist that documented Wilson's pedagogy.

== Notable students ==
- Terri Lyne Carrington
- Cyrus Chestnut
- Hal Crook
- Roy Hargrove
- Aubrey Logan
- Delfeayo Marsalis
- Elliot Mason
- Makoto Ozone
- Mika Pohjola
- John Scofield
- Ernie Watts

== Discography ==
- 1968: Prodigal Sun (Freeform)
- 1975: The Sound of the Wasp (ASI)
- 1976: That's All (Famous Door) with John Bunch
- 1977: Live and Cookin (Outrageous) with Howie Smith
- 1980: New York Axis (Famous Door) with John Bunch, Vic Dickenson, Butch Miles
- 1980: Fruits (Circle)
- 1983: Live!! at the Berklee Performance Center (Shiah) with Makoto Ozone
- 1983: Live at Joe Segal's Jazz Showcase (Shiah)
- 1985: Latin America Tour (Shiah)
- 1989: The Wizard of Oz Suite (Capri)
- 1990: Pal Joey Suite (Capri)
- 1995: AC-Cent-Tchu-Ate the Positive: Arlen Songs (Seaside)
- 2005: The Music of Antonio Carlos Jobim (Torrey plump)

=== As sideman ===
With Woody Herman

- Woody Herman–1963 (Philips, 1963)1964
