= Woody Herman =

American jazz musician and bandleader (1913–1987)

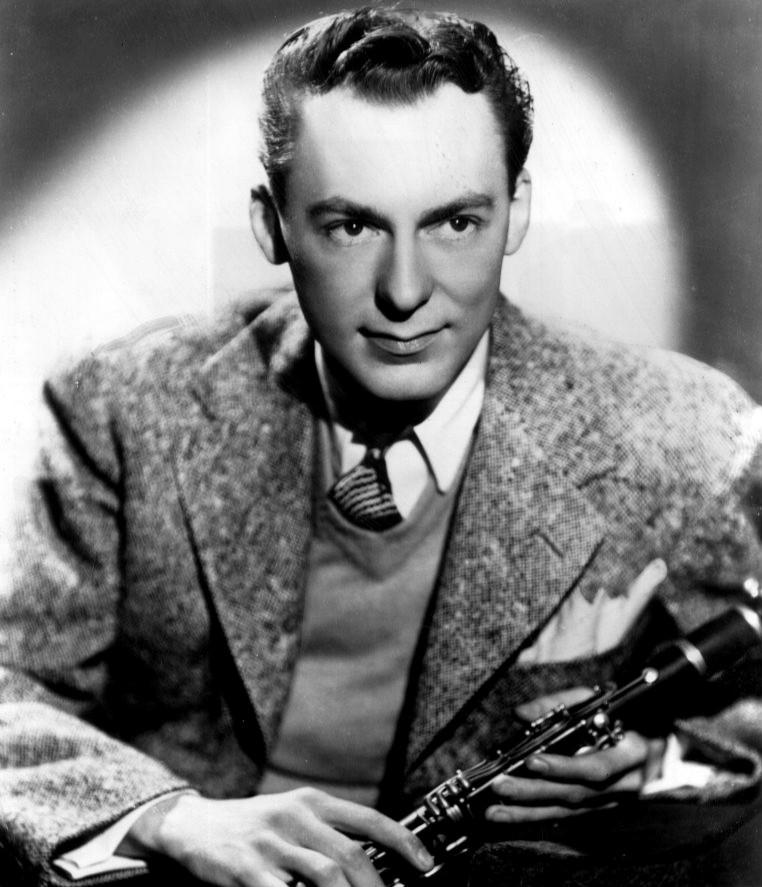
- Herman in 1943

Background information
- Born: Woodrow Charles Herman; May 16, 1913; Milwaukee, Wisconsin, U.S.
- Died: October 29, 1987 (aged 74) West Hollywood, California, U.S.
- Genres: Big band; swing; cool jazz
- Occupations: Bandleader; musician
- Instruments: Vocals; clarinet; alto saxophone; soprano saxophone

Woodrow Charles Herman (May 16, 1913 – October 29, 1987) was an American jazz clarinetist, saxophonist, singer, and big band leader. Leading groups called "The Herd", Herman came to prominence in the late 1930s and was active until his death in 1987. His bands often played music that was cutting edge and experimental; their recordings received numerous Grammy nominations with three wins plus a lifetime achievement award for Herman.

== Early life and career ==
Herman was born in Milwaukee, Wisconsin, on May 16, 1913. His parents were Otto and Myrtle (Bartoszewicz) Herrmann. His mother was born in Poland. His father had a deep love for show business and this influenced Woody at an early age.

As a child, Woody Herman worked as a singer and tap-dancer in vaudeville, then started to play the clarinet and saxophone by age 12. In 1931 he met Charlotte Neste, an aspiring actress; the couple married on September 27, 1936. Woody Herman joined the Tom Gerun band, and his first recorded vocals were "Lonesome Me" and "My Heart's at Ease". Herman also performed with the Harry Sosnick orchestra, Gus Arnheim, and Isham Jones. Jones wrote many popular songs (including "It Had to Be You") and at some point was tiring of the demands of leading a band and wanted to live off the residuals of his songs. Herman saw the chance to lead his former band and eventually acquired the remains of the orchestra after Jones' retirement.

== The Band That Plays the Blues, 1936–1943 ==
Herman's first band became known for its orchestrations of the blues, and was sometimes billed as "The Band That Plays the Blues". This band recorded for the Decca label, at first serving as a cover band, doing songs by other Decca artists. The first song recorded was "Wintertime Dreams" on November 6, 1936. In January 1937, George T. Simon ended a review of the band with the words: "This Herman outfit bears watching; not only because it's fun listening to in its present stages, but also because it's bound to reach even greater stages." After two and a half years on the label, the band had its first hit, "Woodchopper's Ball" recorded in 1939. Herman remembered that "Woodchopper's Ball" started out slowly. "[I]t was really a sleeper. But Decca kept re-releasing it, and over a period of three or four years it became a hit. Eventually it sold more than five million copies—the biggest hit I ever had." Decca also used Herman to accompany its other artists and gave the band the name "Woody Herman's Woodchoppers" for such recordings. There were two notable hits using that title with Bing Crosby, "The Whistler's Mother-in-law" (with Muriel Lane singing with Crosby) in 1941 and "Deep in the Heart of Texas" in 1942. In January 1942, Herman would have his highest-rated single (No. 1 in the Billboard charts), singing Harold Arlen's "Blues in the Night" backed by his orchestra. Other hits for the band include "Blue Flame" and "Do Nothin' Till You Hear from Me". Musicians and arrangers that stood out included Cappy Lewis on trumpet and saxophonist/arranger Deane Kincaide. "The Golden Wedding" (1941), arranged by James "Jiggs" Noble, featured an extended (34 bars) drum solo by Frankie Carlson.

== Be-bop and the First Herd, 1944–1946 ==
The trumpeter Dizzy Gillespie wrote three arrangements for Herman, "Woody'n You", "Swing Shift", and "Down Under". These were arranged in 1942. "Woody'n You" was not used at the time. "Down Under" was recorded July 24, 1942. Herman's commissioning Gillespie to write arrangements for the band and hiring Ralph Burns as a staff arranger heralded a change in the style of music the band was playing.

In February 1945, the band started a contract with Columbia Records. Herman liked what drew many artists to Columbia, Liederkranz Hall, at the time the best recording venue in New York City. The first side Herman recorded was "Laura", the theme song of the 1944 movie. Herman's version was so successful that it made Columbia hold from release the arrangement that Harry James had recorded days earlier. The Columbia contract coincided with a change in the band's repertoire. The 1944 group, which he called the First Herd, was known for its progressive jazz. The First Herd's music was heavily influenced by Duke Ellington and Count Basie. Its lively, swinging arrangements, combining bop themes with swing rhythm parts, were greatly admired. As of February 1945, the personnel included Sonny Berman, Pete Candoli, Bill Harris, Flip Phillips, Billy Bauer (later replaced by Chuck Wayne), Ralph Burns, and Davey Tough. On February 26, 1945, in New York City, the Woody Herman band recorded "Caldonia".

Neal Hefti and Ralph Burns collaborated on the arrangement of "Caldonia" that the Herman band used. "Ralph caught Louis Jordan [singing "Caldonia"] in an act and wrote the opening twelve bars and the eight bar tag." "But the most amazing thing on the record was a soaring eight bar passage by trumpets near the end." These eight measures have wrongly been attributed to a Gillespie solo, but were in fact originally written by Neal Hefti. George T. Simon compares Hefti with Gillespie in a 1944 review for Metronome magazine saying, "Like Dizzy [...], Hefti has an abundance of good ideas, with which he has aided Ralph Burns immensely."

In 1946, the band won DownBeat, Metronome, Billboard, and Esquire polls for best band, nominated by their peers in the big band business.

Classical composer Igor Stravinsky wrote the Ebony Concerto, one in a series of compositions commissioned by Herman with solo clarinet, for this band in 1945. Herman recorded the work at Belock Recording Studio in Bayside, New York. Herman called it a "very delicate and a very sad piece". Stravinsky felt that the jazz musicians would have a hard time with the various time signatures. Saxophonist Flip Philips said: "During the rehearsal [...] there was a passage I had to play there and I was playing it soft, and Stravinsky said 'Play it, here I am!' and I blew it louder and he threw me a kiss!" Stravinsky observed the massive amount of smoking at the recording session: "The atmosphere looked like Pernod clouded by water." Ebony Concerto was performed live by the Herman band on March 25, 1946, at Carnegie Hall.

Despite the Carnegie Hall success and other triumphs, Herman was forced to disband the orchestra in 1946 at the height of its success. This was his only financially successful band; he left it to spend more time with his wife and family. During this time, he and his family had just moved into the former Hollywood home of Humphrey Bogart and Lauren Bacall. One reason Herman may have disbanded was his wife Charlotte's growing alcoholism and pill addiction. Charlotte Herman joined Alcoholics Anonymous and gave up everything she was addicted to. Woody said, laughing: "I went to an AA meeting with Charlotte and my old band was sitting there." Many critics cite December 1946 as the actual date the big-band era ended when seven other bands, in addition to Herman's, dissolved.

== "The Four Brothers Band" and more Herds, 1947–1969 ==
In 1947, Herman organized the Second Herd. This band was also known as "The Four Brothers Band". This derives from the song recorded December 27, 1947, for Columbia Records, "Four Brothers", written by Jimmy Giuffre, featuring the saxophone section of Zoot Sims, Serge Chaloff, Herbie Steward, and Stan Getz. The other musicians of this band included Al Cohn, Gene Ammons, Lou Levy, Oscar Pettiford, Terry Gibbs, and Shelly Manne. Among this band's hits were "Early Autumn" and "The Goof and I". The band was popular enough that they went to Hollywood in the mid-1940s. Herman and his band appear in the movie New Orleans (1947) with Billie Holiday and Louis Armstrong.

In 1947, Herman was Emcee and also played at the third Cavalcade of Jazz concert held at Wrigley Field in Los Angeles and produced by Leon Hefflin, Sr. on September 7, 1947. The Valdez Orchestra, The Blenders, T-Bone Walker, Slim Gaillard, The Honeydrippers, Johnny Otis and his Orchestra, Sarah Vaughn, and the Three Blazers also performed that same day.

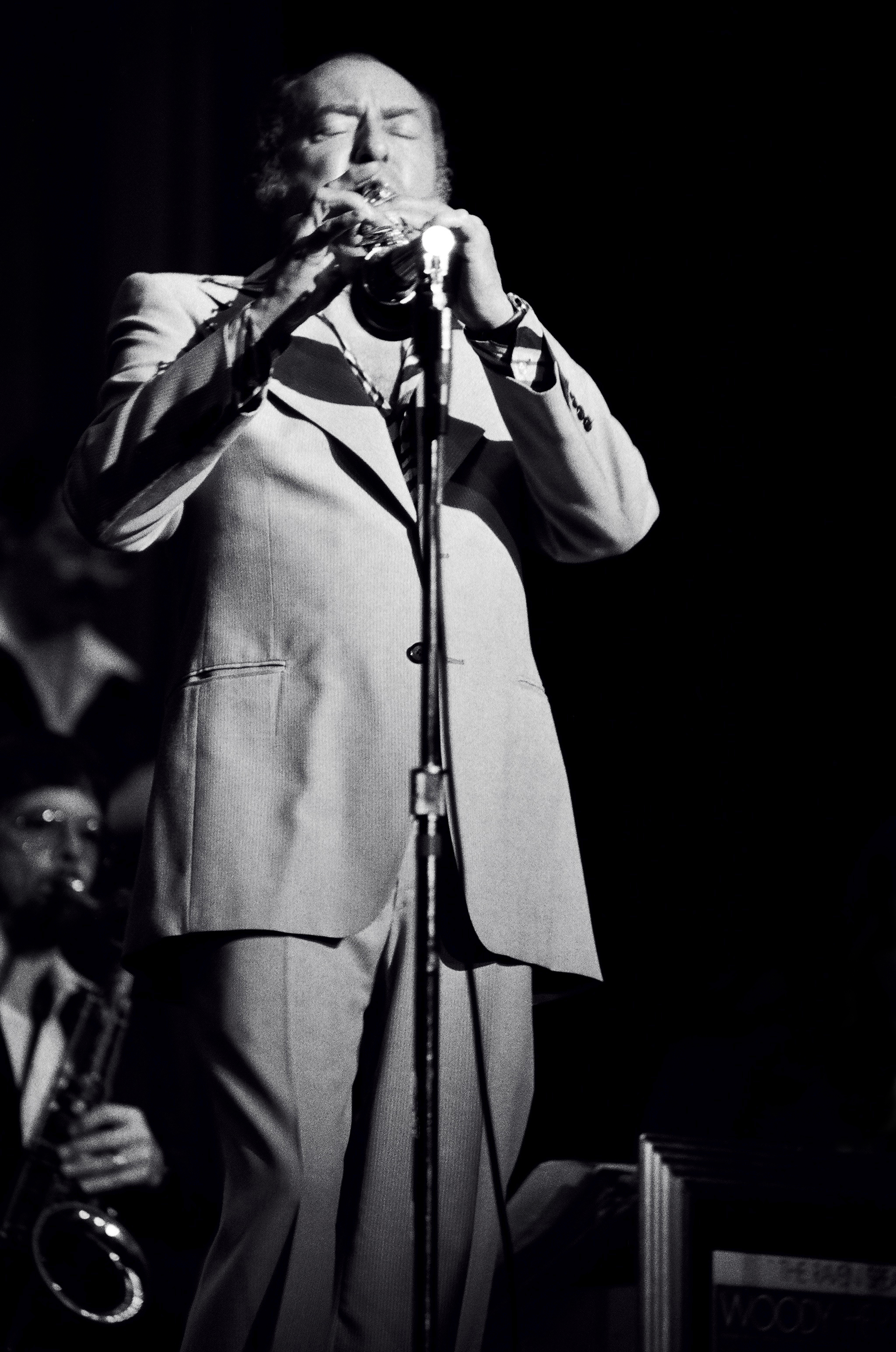
Herman in 1976

Herman's other bands include the Third Herd (1950-56) and various later editions during the 1960s. In the 1950s, the Third Herd successfully toured Europe. He was known for hiring the best young musicians and using their arrangements. In the early and mid 1960s, Herman fronted a Herd featuring Michael Moore, drummer Jake Hanna, tenor saxophonist Sal Nistico, trombonists Phil Wilson and Henry Southall, and trumpeters Bill Chase, Paul Fontaine, and Duško Gojković. By 1968, the Herman library came to be heavily influenced by rock and roll. He was also known to feature brass and woodwind instruments rarely associated with jazz, including the bassoon, oboe, and French horn.

In concert, as the evening wore on and the crowd started dissipating, Herman would often leave the stage and let the band continue the last set on its own; but Terry Gibbs confirmed that the band never sounded the same without Herman being present.

== "The Young Thundering Herds", 1970–1987 ==
In the early 1970s, he toured frequently and began to work more in jazz education, offering workshops and taking on younger sidemen. For this reason, he got the nickname Road Father and the bands were known as the "Young Thundering Herds". In January 1973, Herman was one of the featured halftime performers at Super Bowl VII. In 1974, Woody Herman's band appeared without their leader for Frank Sinatra's television special The Main Event and album The Main Event – Live. Both were recorded mainly on October 13, 1974, at Madison Square Garden in New York City. On November 20, 1976, a reconstituted Woody Herman band played at Carnegie Hall in New York City, celebrating Herman's fortieth anniversary as a bandleader.

By the 1980s, Herman had returned to more straight-ahead jazz but augmented with rock and fusion. Herman signed a recording contract with Concord Records around 1980. In 1981, John S. Wilson reviewed one of Herman's first Concord recordings Woody Herman Presents a Concord Jam, Vol. I. Wilson's review says that the recording presents a band that is less frenetic than his bands from the 1940s to the 70s. Instead, it takes the listener back to the relaxed style of Herman's first band of the 30s that recorded for Decca.

== Last years ==
Herman continued to perform into the 1980s, after the death of his wife and with his health in decline, chiefly to pay back taxes that were owed because of his business manager's bookkeeping in the 1960s. Herman owed the IRS millions of dollars and was in danger of eviction from his home. With this added stress, Herman still kept performing. In a December 5, 1985, review of the band at the Blue Note jazz club for The New York Times, John S. Wilson pointed out: "In a one-hour set, Mr. Herman is able to show off his latest batch of young stars—the baritone saxophonist Mike Brignola, the bassist Bill Moring, the pianist Brad Williams, the trumpeter Ron Stout—and to remind listeners that one of his own basic charms is the dry humor with which he shouts the blues." Wilson also spoke about arrangements by Bill Holman and John Fedchock for special attention. Wilson spoke of the continuing influence of Duke Ellington on Woody Herman bands from the 1940s to the 1980s. One of Woody Hermans' last concert tours was in Australia, in 1985, where he made television appearances, and played in Perth, backed by the West Australian Symphony Orchestra. Before Woody Herman died in 1987 he delegated most of his duties to leader of the reed section, Frank Tiberi. Tiberi leads the current version of the Woody Herman orchestra. Tiberi said at the time of Herman's death that he would not change the band's repertoire or library. Herman died on October 29, 1987, and had a Catholic funeral on November 2 at St. Victor's in West Hollywood, California. He is interred in a niche in the columbarium behind the Cathedral Mausoleum in the Hollywood Forever Cemetery.

Awards won by the Woody Herman orchestras with major publications: "Voted best swing band in 1945 DownBeat poll; Silver Award by critics in 1946 and 1947 Esquire polls; won Metronome poll, band division, 1946 and 1953.

A documentary film titled Woody Herman: Blue Flame – Portrait of a Jazz Legend was released on DVD in late 2012 by the jazz documentary filmmaker Graham Carter, owner of Jazzed Media, to salute Herman and his centenary in May 2013.

== Gold records and charts (singles and albums) ==
Gold Records

- 1939 Woodchopper's Ball (Decca Records) instrumental
- 1945 Laura (Columbia Records) vocal by Woody Herman

=== Hits as charted singles ===
(Songs that reached the top of the US or UK charts)

Between 1937 and 1956, Herman had numerous hits on Billboard's charts.

Year	Title	Chart peak position	
Year	Title	US	US R&B
1937	"I Double Dare You"	18	
1939	"At the Woodchopper's Ball"	9	
1939	"Blue Evening"	9	
1941	"There I Go"	13	
1941	"Frenesi"	16	
1941	"The Golden Wedding"	23	
1941	"Blue Flame"	5	
1941	"G'bye Now" (sung by Muriel Lane)	10	
1941	"By-U By-O" (sung by Muriel Lane)	20	
1942	"Blues in the Night" (sung by Woody Herman)	1	
1942	"Rose O'Day" (sung by Carolyn Grey & Woody Herman)	18	
1942	"Amen"	5	
1943	"Four or Five Times"	17	
1944	"Do Nothin' Till You Hear from Me"	7	4
1944	"The Music Stopped" (sung by Frances Wayne)	10	
1944	"By the River of the Roses"	12	
1944	"Milkman, Keep Those Bottles Quiet"	10	
1944	"Let Me Love You Tonight" (sung by Billie Rogers)	18	
1945	"Saturday Night (Is the Loneliest Night in the Week)" (sung by Frances Wayne)	18	
1945	"Laura"	4	
1945	"Caldonia"	2	
1945	"A Kiss Goodnight"	9	
1945	"Northwest Passage"	13	
1946	"Fan It"		4
1946	"Gee, It's Good to Hold You" (sung by Frances Wayne)	17	
1946	"Everybody Knew but Me "	11	
1946	"Let It Snow! Let It Snow! Let It Snow!"	7	
1946	"Atlanta, G.A."	11	
1946	"Surrender"	8	
1946	"Mabel! Mabel!"	12	
1947	"Across the Alley from the Alamo"	12	
1947	"That's My Desire" (Woody Herman & the Four Chips)	13	
1948	"Civilization (Bongo, Bongo, Bongo)"	15	
1948	"Sabre Dance"	3	
1955	"Love Is a Many-Splendored Thing"	79	
1956	"I Don't Want Nobody (To Have My Love but You)"	75	

=== Hits as charted albums ===
(Albums charting history with Billboard magazine)

Year	Album	Chart peak/ year end	
Year	Album	Peak, US	Year end
1963	Encore: Woody Herman – 1963	136 (Aug. 1963)	
1964	Woody Herman: 1964	148 (March; 1963)	

== Grammy Awards ==
Grammy Awards (albums)

Year	Nominee / work	Award	Result
1963	Encore: Woody Herman, 1963	Best Performance by an orchestra – for dancing	Nominated
1963	Encore: Woody Herman, 1963	Best Jazz Performance – Large Group (Instrumental)	Won
1964	Woody Herman '64	Best Jazz Performance – Large Group (Instrumental)	Nominated
1966	Woody's Winners	Best Jazz Performance – Large Group (Instrumental)	Nominated
1967	Woody Live – East And West	Best Jazz Performance – Large Group (Instrumental)	Nominated
1968	Concerto For Herd	Best Jazz Performance – Large Group (Instrumental)	Nominated
1969	Light My Fire	Best Jazz Performance – Large Group (Instrumental)	Nominated
1971	Woody	Best Jazz Performance – Large Group (Instrumental)	Nominated
1973	Giant Steps	Best Jazz Performance – Large Group (Instrumental)	Won
1974	Thundering Herd	Best Jazz Performance – Large Group (Instrumental)	Won
1977	The 40th Anniversary, Carnegie Hall Concert	Best Jazz Performance – Large Group (Instrumental)	Nominated
1982	Live At The Concord Jazz Festival 1981	Best Jazz Performance – Large Group (Instrumental)	Nominated
1984	World Class	Best Jazz Performance – Large Group (Instrumental)	Nominated
1986	50th Anniversary Tour	Best Jazz Performance – Large Group (Instrumental)	Nominated
1987	Woody's Gold Star	Best Jazz Performance – Large Group (Instrumental)	Nominated

Grammy Lifetime Achievement Award

Year	Nominee / work	Award	Result
1987	Woody Herman	Lifetime Achievement Award	Inducted

== Further awards and honors ==
- Honored on the Hollywood Walk of Fame (Recording – 6805 Hollywood Blvd.)
- Woody Herman Music Archives established at the University of Houston School of Music, 1974
- Honorary doctorate, Berklee College of Music, 1977

== Discography ==
=== Studio albums ===
- Blues On Parade (Decca, 1940)
- Sequence In Jazz with the First Herd (Columbia, 1948)
- Swinging with the Woodchoppers with the First Herd (Dial, 1950)
- Blue Prelude (Coral, 1950)
- Woody Herman Goes Native (Mars, 1953)
- Four Shades of Blue (Columbia, 1953)
- The 3 Herds (Columbia, 1954)
- Men From Mars (London, 1954)
- Music For Tired Lovers (Columbia, 1955)
- Ridin' Herd (Columbia, 1955)
- The Woody Herman Band! (Capitol, 1955)
- Road Band! (Capitol, 1955)
- HI FI-ing Herd (MGM, 1955)
- Jackpot! (Capitol, 1956)
- Blues Groove (Capitol, 1956)
- Hi-Fi Drums (Capitol, 1956)
- Twelve Shades of Blue (Columbia, 1955)
- Songs For Hip Lovers (Verve, 1957)
- Woody Herman '58 featuring The Preacher (Verve, 1958)
- Jazz, The Utmost! (Columbia, 1958)
- Moody Woody (Everest, 1958)
- Herman's Heat & Puente's Beat! (Everest, 1958)
- The Herd Rides Again – in Stereo (Everest, 1958)
- The Fourth Herd (Jazzland, 1960)
- The New Swingin' Herman Herd (Crown, 1960)
- Swing Low, Sweet Clarinet (Philips, 1962)
- Woody Herman–1963 (Philips, 1962)
- Hey! Heard The Herd? (Verve, 1963)
- Woody's Big Band Goodies (Philips, 1965)
- Woody's Winners (Columbia, 1965)
- My Kind of Broadway (Columbia, 1965)
- The Jazz Swinger (Columbia, 1966)
- Jazz Hoot (Columbia, 1967)
- Light My Fire (Cadet, 1968)
- Somewhere (Cadet, 1969)
- Heavy Exposure (Cadet, 1970)
- Woody (Cadet, 1970)
- Brand New (Fantasy, 1971)
- The Raven Speaks (Fantasy, 1972)
- Giant Steps (Fantasy, 1973)
- Thundering Herd (Fantasy, 1974)
- Children of Lima (Fantasy, 1975)
- King Cobra (Fantasy, 1976)
- Road Father (Century, 1978)
- Flip Phillips/Woody Herman – Together (Century, 1978)
- Chick, Donald, Walter, and Woodrow (Century, 1978)
- Feelin' So Blue (Fantasy, 1981)
- Presents Volume 2 ...Four Others (Concord, 1982)
- Rosemary Clooney/Woody Herman – My Buddy (Concord, 1983)
- World Class (Concord, 1984)
- Woody's Gold Star (Concord, 1987)
- Ebony (RCA Victor Red Seal, 1988) (Richard Stoltzman & Woody Herman's Thundering Herd)

=== Live albums ===
- At Carnegie Hall, 1946 Vol. I with the First Herd (MGM, 1952)
- Woody Herman Sextet At The Roundtable (Roulette, R-25067 Forum F 9016 1959)
- Woody Herman's Big New Herd – At The Monterey Jazz Festival (Atlantic, 1960)
- Encore Woody Herman–1963 (Philips, 1963)
- Woody Herman: 1964 (Philips, 1964)
- The Swinging Herman Herd-Recorded Live (Philips, 1964)
- Woody Live East And West (Columbia, 1967)
- Concerto for Herd – At the Monterey Jazz Festival (Atlantic, 1968)
- Herd At Montreux (Fantasy, 1974)
- The 40th Anniversary, Carnegie Hall Concert (RCA, 1977)
- Woody and Friends at the Monterey Jazz Festival (Concord, 1979)
- Woody Herman Presents a Concord Jam Volume 1 (Concord, 1981)
- Aurex Jazz Festival '82 (Eastworld/Toshiba, 1982)
- Live at the Concord Jazz Festival (Concord, 1982)
- 50th Anniversary Tour (Concord, 1986)

=== As sideman ===
With Buck Clayton

- How Hi the Fi (Columbia, 1954)
- Jumpin' at the Woodside (Columbia, 1955)
