= List of Finnish musicians =

Musicians from Finland are active in folk music, classical and contemporary art music, and contemporary popular music.

The folk music of Finland is typically influenced by Karelian traditional tunes and lyrics of the Kalevala metre. In the west of the country, more mainstream Nordic folk music traditions prevail. The Sami people of northern Finland have their own musical traditions, collectively Sami music. Finnish folk music has undergone a roots revival in the recent decades, and has also become a part of popular music.

In the field of classical and contemporary art music, Finland has produced many musicians and composers.

Contemporary popular music includes a renowned heavy metal scene like other Nordic countries, as well as a number of prominent rock and pop bands, jazz musicians, hip hop performers and makers of dance music.

== Individuals ==
Name	Born	Died	Speciality	Genre
Jarkko Ahola	1977		Vocalist, bass guitarist	Pop/rock
Amoc	1984		Rapper in Inari Sami	Pop/rock
Paavo Berglund	1929	2012	Conductor, violinist	Classical
Anna Eriksson	1977		Singer, composer	Pop/rock, film score
Mikko Franck	1979		Conductor, violinist	Classical
Ville Friman	1980		Guitarist	Pop/rock
Ralf Gothóni	1946		Pianist, conductor, composer	Classical
Reino Helismaa	1913	1965	Vocalist, songwriter	Pop/rock
Marko Hietala	1966		Bass guitarist, vocalist	Pop/rock
Tuomas Holopainen	1976		Multi-instrumentalist	Pop/rock
Mikko Härkin	1979		Keyboardist	Pop/rock
Taneli Jarva	1975		Vocalist, bass guitarist	Pop/rock
Konsta Jylhä	1910	1984	Fiddler	Folk
Jari Kainulainen	1970		Bass guitarist	Pop/rock
Robert Kajanus	1856	1933	Conductor	Classical
Tony Kakko	1975		Vocalist	Pop/rock
Maria Kalaniemi	1964		Accordionist	Folk
Perttu Kivilaakso	1978		Cellist	Pop/rock
Litku Klemetti	1987		Singer	Pop/rock
Timo Kotipelto	1969		Vocalist	Pop/rock
Kari Kriikku	1960		Clarinetist	Classical
Sami Kukkohovi	1974		Bass guitarist	Pop/rock
Alexander Kuoppala	1974		Guitarist	Pop/rock
Erkki Kurenniemi	1941	2017	Composer	Electronic music
Pekka Kuusisto	1976		Violinist	Classical
Arthur Kylander	1892	1968	Singer, songwriter, mandolinist	Folk
Ville Laihiala	1973		Vocalist	Pop/rock
Alexi Laiho	1979	2020	Guitarist, composer, vocalist	Pop/rock
Roope Latvala	1970		Guitarist	Pop/rock
Risto Lauriala	1949		Pianist	Classical
JP Leppäluoto	1974		Vocalist, songwriter	Pop/rock
Max Lilja	1975		Cellist	Pop/rock, classical
Tonmi Lillman	1973		Drummer	Pop/rock
Dave Lindholm	1952		Vocalist, guitarist, songwriter	Pop/rock
Mikko Lindström (Linde)	1976		Guitarist, songwriter	Pop/rock
Gas Lipstick	1971		Drummer	Pop/rock
Sami Lopakka	1975		Guitarist	Pop/rock
Paavo Lötjönen	1968		Cellist	Pop/rock
Mika Luttinen	1971		Vocalist, songwriter	Pop/rock
Klaus Mäkelä	1996		Conductor, cellist	Classical
Susanna Mälkki	1969		Conductor, cellist	Classical
Eugen Malmstén	1907	1993	Vocalist, conductor, composer	Pop/rock
Georg Malmstén	1902	1981	Vocalist, conductor, composer	Pop/rock
Antero Manninen	1973		Cellist	Classical, pop/rock
Andy McCoy	1962		Guitarist, songwriter	Pop/rock
Pelle Miljoona	1955		Vocalist, drummer, songwriter	Pop/rock
Olli Mustonen	1967		Pianist, conductor, composer	Classical
Jukka Nevalainen	1978		Drummer	Pop/rock
M. A. Numminen	1940		Singer, guitarist, drummer	Pop/rock, jazz, tango
Sakari Oramo	1965		Conductor	Classical
Mikko Paananen (Mige)	1974		Bass guitarist	Pop/rock
Esa Pakarinen	1911	1989	Singer, accordionist	Pop/rock
Janne Parviainen	1973		Drummer	Pop/rock
Pekka Pohjola	1952	2008	Bass, keyboards, violin	Progressive rock, jazz fusion
Lauri Porra	1977		Bass guitarist, composer	Pop/rock, classical
Janne Puurtinen (Burton)	1974		Keyboard player	Pop/rock
Jaska Raatikainen	1979		Drummer	Pop/rock
Teemu Raimoranta	1977		Guitarist	Pop/rock
Vesa Ranta	1973		Drummer	Pop/rock
Tapio Rautavaara	1915	1979	Vocalist, guitarist	Pop/rock
Diana Ringo	1992		Composer	Film score, electronic
Esa-Pekka Salonen	1958		Conductor, composer	Classical
Jukka-Pekka Saraste	1956		Conductor, violinist	Classical
Leif Segerstam	1944	2024	Conductor, composer, instrumentalist	Classical
Henkka Seppälä	1980		Bass guitarist	Pop/rock
Niilo Sevänen	1979		Vocalist, bass guitarist	Pop/rock
Erna Siikavirta	1977		Keyboard player	Pop/rock
Mikko Sirén	1975		Drummer	Pop/rock
Pekka Streng	1948	1975	Vocalist, guitarist, songwriter	Pop/rock
Nasty Suicide	1963		Guitarist	Pop/rock
Miika Tenkula	1974	2009	Guitarist, vocalist, songwriter	Pop/rock
Timo Tolkki	1966		Guitarist, songwriter	Pop/rock
Eicca Toppinen	1975		Cellist, composer	Pop/rock
Tarja Turunen	1977		Vocalist, songwriter	Pop/rock
Juha Vainio	1938	1990	Vocalist, songwriter	Pop/rock
Ville Valo	1976		Vocalist	Pop/rock
Edward Vesala	1945	1975	Drummer	Jazz
Ville Vänni	1979		Guitarist	Pop/rock
Osmo Vänskä	1953		Conductor, clarinetist, composer	Classical
Sami Vänskä	1976		Bass guitarist	Pop/rock
Emppu Vuorinen	1978		Guitarist	Pop/rock
Janne Wirman	1979		Keyboard player	Pop/rock
Klaus Wirzenius	1987	2025	Bassist, guitarist, singer, musician	Rock
Sami Yaffa	1963		Bass guitarist	Pop/rock

== Bands and groups ==
Name	Formed	Genre
The 69 Eyes	1989	Gothic rock
Amberian Dawn	2006	Heavy metal
Amorphis	1990	Progressive metal/melodic death metal
Apocalyptica	1993	Symphonic metal/cello metal
Azaghal	1995	Black metal
Before The Dawn	1999	Heavy metal
Beherit	1989	Black metal
Blind Channel	2013	Alternative nu-metal
Blues Section	1967	Rock
Bomfunk MC's	1998	Hip Hop
Children of Bodom	1993	Melodic death metal/power metal
Demilich	1990	Death metal
Dingo	1982	Rock
Dreamtale	1998	Symphonic power metal
Ensiferum	1995	Folk metal/melodic death metal/power metal
Eppu Normaali	1976	Rock
Falchion	2002	Folk metal/melodic death metal
Finntroll	1997	Folk metal/black metal
Frigg	2000	Folk
Hanoi Rocks	1979	Glam rock/hard rock/glam punk
Hassisen Kone	1979	Rock
Hevisaurus	2009	Heavy metal/power metal/children's music
HIM	1991	Gothic rock/gothic metal
Hurriganes	1971	Rock
Impaled Nazarene	1990	Black metal/blackened thrash metal
JPP	1983	Folk
KAJ	2009	Comedy/Pop
Kalmah	1991	Melodic death metal/power metal
Korpiklaani	1993	Folk metal
Kuunkuiskaajat	2008	Pop
Liimanarina	1989	Folk/punk
Lordi	1992	Hard rock/heavy metal/shock rock
Moonsorrow	1995	Folk metal/black metal/pagan metal
Nightwish	1996	Symphonic metal/power metal/gothic metal
The Rasmus	1994	Rock/alternative rock/gothic rock
Rotten Sound	1993	Grindcore
Sargeist	1999	Black metal
Sir Elwoodin hiljaiset värit	1989	Rock
Sonata Arctica	1996	Power metal
Stratovarius	1985	Power metal/progressive metal
Tasavallan Presidentti	1969	Progressive rock
Terveet Kädet	1980	Hardcore punk
Thunderstone	2000	Power metal
Turisas	1997	Folk metal/power metal/symphonic metal
Värttinä	1983	Folk
Wigwam	1968	Progressive rock
Wintersun	2003	Folk metal/power metal/melodic death metal
Yö	1981	Rock
KUUMAA	2016	Pop

== See also ==
- List of bands from Finland
- List of Finnish singers
- List of Finnish jazz musicians
- List of Finnish operatic sopranos
