= Eero Koivistoinen =

Finnish jazz musician (born 1946)

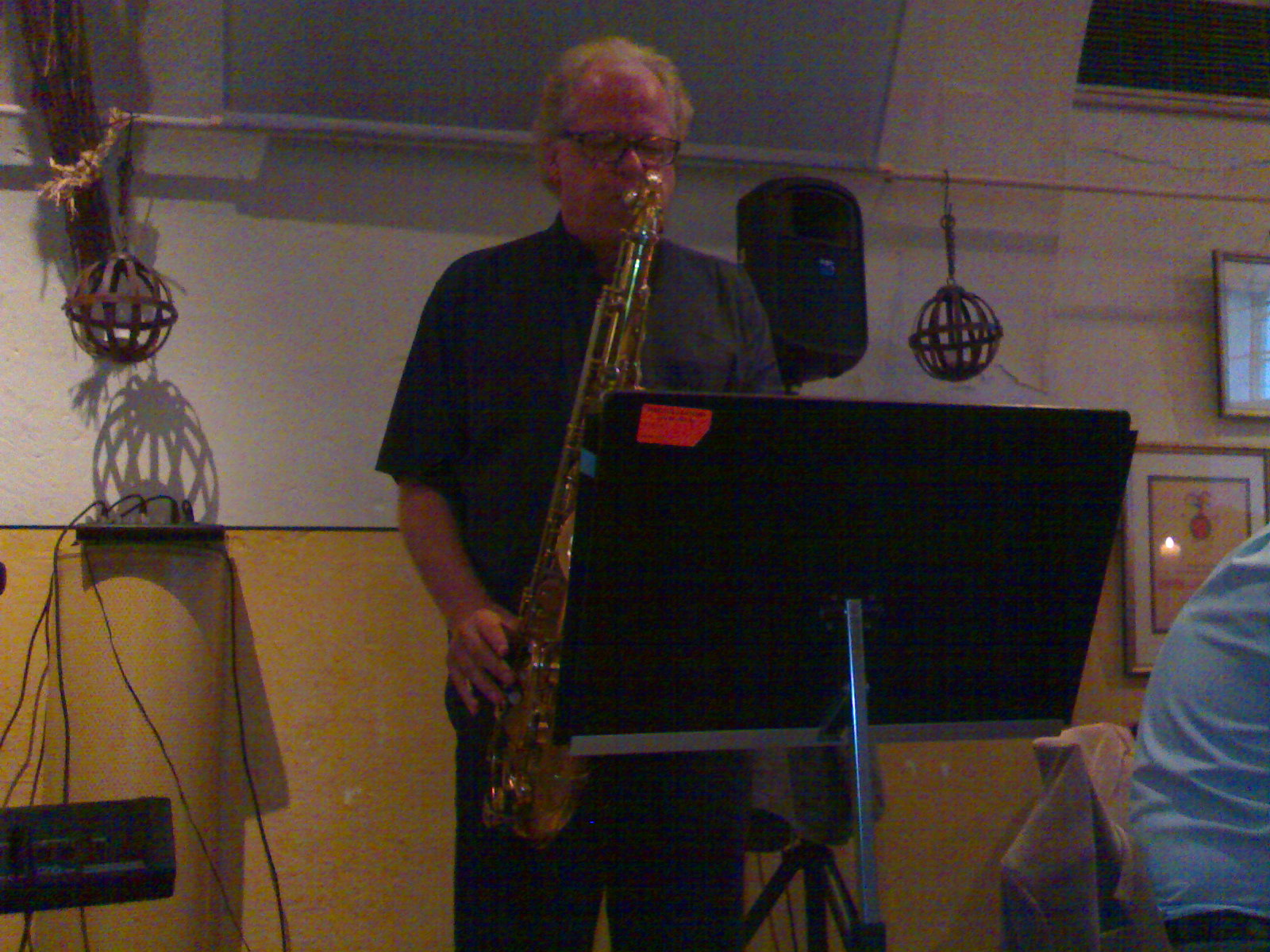
Eero Koivistoinen

Eero Koivistoinen (born 13 January 1946) is a Finnish jazz musician and saxophone player, who started his career in the mid-1960s. Koivistoinen has worked as a musician, composer, arranger, conductor, producer and educator. He was born in Helsinki and first heard jazz from the records his sailor brother had brought in from his travels. As a youngster Koivistoinen studied classical violin, saxophone and also composition at the Sibelius Academy, and later jazz at Berklee College of Music in Boston. His first line-up featured the drummer Edward Vesala and bassist Pekka Sarmanto. Koivistoinen was also a member of the seminal Finnish rock band Blues Section in the years 1967 and 1968. In 1968 he released his first solo album, a "literary record" called Valtakunta which featured songs composed to the texts of such poets as Pentti Saarikoski, Jarkko Laine, Tuomas Anhava and Hannu Mäkelä; interpreted by the vocalists Vesa-Matti Loiri, Eero Raittinen and Seija Simola. Eero Koivistoinen's later solo albums such as Wahoo (1972) enjoy a considerable international reputation. His hip hop-influenced 2006 album X-Ray features such people as the vocalists Charles Salter and Bina Nkwazi, DJ LBJ (also known as Jonas Verwijnen) and the rap artist Redrama (also known as Lasse Mellberg).

Eero Koivistoinen was one of the founder members of the UMO Jazz Orchestra where he played from 1975 to 1990 and worked as its artistic director from 1996 to 1998. He has also composed music for radio and theatre. Koivistoinen has received the Yrjö prize of the Finnish Jazz Association in 1967, his quartet won the band competition at Montreux Jazz Festival in 1969, and Koivistoinen also won in 1981 the prize for the best arrangement with his piece "Ultima Thule" at the Nordring competition of European broadcasting companies, held in Jersey.

== Discography ==
- Blues Section (1967)
- Valtakunta (1968)
- Odysseus (1969)
- For Children (1970)
- Original Sin (1971)
- Muusa ja Ruusa (1971)
- Wahoo! (1972)
- 3rd Version (1973)
- Front Is Breaking (1976)
- Labyrinth (1977)
- Live at Belmont Jazz Club (1977)
- Ultima Thule (1983)
- Picture in Three Colours (1983)
- Sea Suite (1983)
- UMO Plays the Music of Koivistoinen and Linkola (1985)
- Kallista on ja halvalla menee (1988)
- Pahan Kukkia (1990)
- Altered Things (1992)
- Dialog (1995)
- Electrifying Miles (1997)
- UMO Jazz Orchestra (1997)
- Senegalese Drums (1998)
- Helium (1999)
- Some Time Ago (1999)
- Zone (1999)
- Mozambique Relief (2000)
- UTU (2001)
- Venancio Mbande Orchestra (2001)
- Timbila (2002)
- Suomalainen (2003)
- Galaxy (2003)
- The Five Corners Quintet (2005)
- X-Ray (2006)
- For Children (2023)

With Ted Curson

- Ode to Booker Ervin (EMI Columbia, 1970)

== See also ==
- Finnish jazz musicians
- Music of Finland
