= List of Finnish jazz musicians =

This is a list of Finnish jazz musicians notable enough for Wikipedia articles.

== A ==
- Aaltonen, Juhani "Junnu" (saxophonist, flutist, composer)

== B ==
- Björkenheim, Raoul (guitarist, composer)

== D ==
- Donner, Otto (trumpetist, composer, arranger, producer)

== E ==
- Eskelinen, Rami (drummer)

== I ==
- Innanen, Mikko (saxophonist, composer)

== J ==
- Jalava, Pertti "Peppe" (drummer, pianist, composer)

== K ==
- Koivistoinen, Eero (saxophonist, composer)
- Kukko, Sakari (saxophonist, composer)
- Kuoppamäki, Sami (drummer)

== L ==
- Linkola, Jukka (pianist, composer)
- Louhivuori, Olavi (drummer, composer)

== P ==
- Pohjola, Mika (pianist, composer)
- Pohjola, Pekka (bassist, composer)
- Pohjola, Verneri (trumpeter)
- Pöyhönen, Valtteri Laurell (guitarist, pianist, composer, bandleader, producer)

== R ==
- Rantala, Iiro (pianist, composer, teacher)

== S ==
- Sarmanto, Heikki (pianist, composer)
- Sarmanto, Pekka (bassist)
- Sarpila, Antti (clarinetist, saxophonist, composer, conductor)
- Savolainen, Jarmo (pianist, keyboardist, composer)Tenor
- Siikasaari, Eerik (bassist)

== T ==
- Tenor, Jimi (saxophonist, multi-instrumentalist, composer)

== V ==
- Vartiainen, Tomi "Varre" (guitarist)
- Vesala, Edward (drummer, composer)

== W ==
- Walli, Hasse (guitarist)

== See also ==
- List of Finnish singers
- List of Finnish musicians
- Music of Finland
