= Bee Hive Records =

American jazz record label

- Founded: 1977
- Founder: Jim Neumann; Susan Neumann
- Defunct: 1984
- Status: Defunct
- Distributor: Bee Hive Records
- Genre: Jazz
- Country of origin: U.S.
- Location: Chicago, Illinois

Bee Hive Records was a jazz record company and label established in 1977 by Jim and Susan Neumann in Chicago.

Bee Hive was named for the club of the same name. Sometimes it recorded musicians who had started in Chicago, such as Junior Mance and Clifford Jordan. The first album was by Nick Brignola in 1977. Bee Hive was its own distributor, and its albums were not as widely available as those from other companies.

In 2015, Mosaic Records released The Complete Bee Hive Sessions (Mosaic MD12-261), a 12-CD box set consisting of sixteen Bee Hive recording sessions from 1977 to 1984.

== Discography ==
#	Artist	Album	Year	Personnel
7000	Nick Brignola	Baritone Madness	77	Pepper Adams, Ted Curson, Dave Holland, Roy Haynes, Derek Smith
7001	Dizzy Reece	Manhattan Project	78	Roy Haynes, Art Davis, Clifford Jordan, Charles Davis, Albert Dailey
7002	Sal Salvador	Starfingers	78	Eddie Bert, Nick Brignola, Sam Jones, Mel Lewis, Derek Smith
7006	Sal Nistico	Neo/Nistico	78	Ted Curson, Nick Brignola, Ronnie Mathews, Sam Jones, Roy Haynes
7007	Curtis Fuller	Fire and Filigree	78	Sam Jones, Freddie Waits, Walter Bishop, Jr., Sal Nistico
7008	Ronnie Mathews	Roots, Branches & Dances	78	Frank Foster, Ray Drummond, Al Foster, Azzedin Weston
7009	Sal Salvador	Juicy Lucy	78	Billy Taylor, Art Davis, Joe Morello
7010	Nick Brignola	Burn Brigade	79	Ronnie Cuber, Cecil Payne, Walter Davis, Jr., Walter Booker, Jimmy Cobb
7011	Ronnie Mathews	Legacy	79	Ricky Ford, Bill Hardman, Walter Booker, Jimmy Cobb
7012	Johnny Hartman	Once in Every Life	80	Victor Gaskin, Keith Copeland, Al Gafa, Billy Taylor, Joe Wilder, Frank Wess
7013	Roland Hanna	The New York Jazz Quartet in Chicago	81	George Mraz, Ben Riley, Frank Wess
7014	Clifford Jordan	Hyde Park After Dark	81	Von Freeman, Cy Touff, Norman Simmons, Victor Sproles, Wilbur Campbell
7015	Junior Mance	Truckin' and Trakin'	83	David "Fathead" Newman, Martin Rivera, Walter Bolden
7016	Dick Katz	In High Profile	84	Frank Wess, Jimmy Knepper, Marc Johnson, Al Harewood
7017	Arnett Cobb	Keep On Pushin'	84	Joe Newman, Al Grey, Junior Mance, George Duvivier, Panama Francis
7018	Clifford Jordan	Dr. Chicago	85	Jaki Byard, Red Rodney, Vernel Fournier, Ed Howard
01	Various	The Bee Hive Sessions: Unissued Tunes Vol. 1		
