= Sarmanto =

Sarmanto is a surname. Notable people with the surname include:

- Heikki Sarmanto (born 1939), Finnish jazz musician and composer
- Pekka Sarmanto (born 1945), Finnish jazz musician
