= Asia Minor (disambiguation) =

Asia Minor is an alternative name for Anatolia, the westernmost protrusion of Asia, comprising the majority of the Republic of Turkey.

Asia Minor may also refer to:

- Asia Minor (album), an album by Jamaican-born jazz trumpeter Dizzy Reece
- "Asia Minor" (instrumental), a 1961 instrumental recording by Jimmy Wisner (operating under the name Kokomo)

== See also ==
- Asia Major (disambiguation)
