= Fliptop =

Fliptop may refer to:

- a type of cigarette pack
- Flip-top bottle
- Flip Top, a 1977 album by American trumpeter Ted Curson
- FlipTop Battle League, or Fliptop, a rap battle conference in the Philippines
