= Phil Markowitz =

American jazz musician

Phil Markowitz (born September 6, 1952 in Brooklyn, New York) is a jazz pianist and educator.

== Discography ==
=== As leader ===
- Sno' Peas (Ken Music, 1991)
- In the Woods (Passage, 1996)
- Taxi Ride (Passage, 1998)
- Catalysis (Sunnyside, 2008)
- Perpetuity (Dot Time, 2014)

=== As sideman ===
With Chet Baker

- Love For Sale: Live At The Rising Sun Celebrity Club (Justin Time, 1978)
- Broken Wing (Sonopresse, 1979)
- Live at Chateauvalion, 1978 (France's Concert, 1989)
- Live at Fat Tuesday's (Fresh Sound, 1991)
- Stella by Starlight (Bandstand, 1992)

With Michael Davis

- Sidewalk Café (Voss, 1989)
- Midnight Crossing (Lipstick, 1994)
- Absolute Trombone (Hip Bone, 1997)
- Brass Nation (Hip Bone, 2000)
- New Brass (Hip Bone, 2002)
- Trumpets Eleven (Hip Bone, 2003)
- Absolute Trombone II (Hip Bone, 2007)

With Dave Liebman

- Turn It Around (Owl, 1992)
- Looking for the Light (CCB, 1992)
- Miles Away (Owl, 1995)
- Songs for My Daughter (Soul Note, 1995)
- Voyage (Evidence, 1996)
- Return of the Tenor/Standards (Double-Time, 1996)
- John Coltrane's Meditations (Arkadia, 1997)
- New Vista (Arkadia, 1997)
- Liebman Plays Puccini (Arkadia, 2001)
- Manhattan Dialogues (Zoho, 2005)

With Bob Mintzer

- Spectrum (DMP, 1988)
- Art of the Big Band (DMP, 1991)
- Departure (DMP, 1993)
- Only in New York (DMP, 1994)
- Big Band Trane (DMP, 1996)
- Latin from Manhattan (DMP, 1998)
- Quality Time (TVT, 1998)
- Homage to Count Basie (DMP, 2000)
- Gently (DMP, 2002)
- Live at MCG (MCG, 2004)
- In the Moment (Art of Life, 2006)
- Swing Out (MCG, 2007)

With others

- Randy Bernsen, Mo Wasabi (Zebra, 1986)
- Nick Brignola, Poinciana (Reservoir, 1998)
- Al Di Meola, Soaring Through a Dream (Manhattan, 1985)
- Jerry Hahn, Time Changes (Enja, 1995)
- Lionel Hampton, Mostly Ballads (Musicmasters, 1990)
- Jaroslav Jakubovič, Coincidence (VMM, 2009)
- Vic Juris, Night Tripper (SteepleChase, 1995)
- Vic Juris, Pastels (SteepleChase, 1996)
- Mel Lewis, Live in Israel
- Susan Osborn, Signature (Lifeline, 1983)
- Marvin Stamm, Bop Boy (Musicmasters, 1991)
- Jeff Tyzik, Jammin in Manhattan (Polydor, 1984)
- Jack Wilkins, You Can't Live Without It (Chiaroscuro, 1977)
- Jack Wilkins, Merge (Chiaroscuro, 1977)
- Paul Winter, Missa Gaia/Earth Mass (Living Music, 1982)
