= Dick Berk =

American jazz drummer (1939–2014)

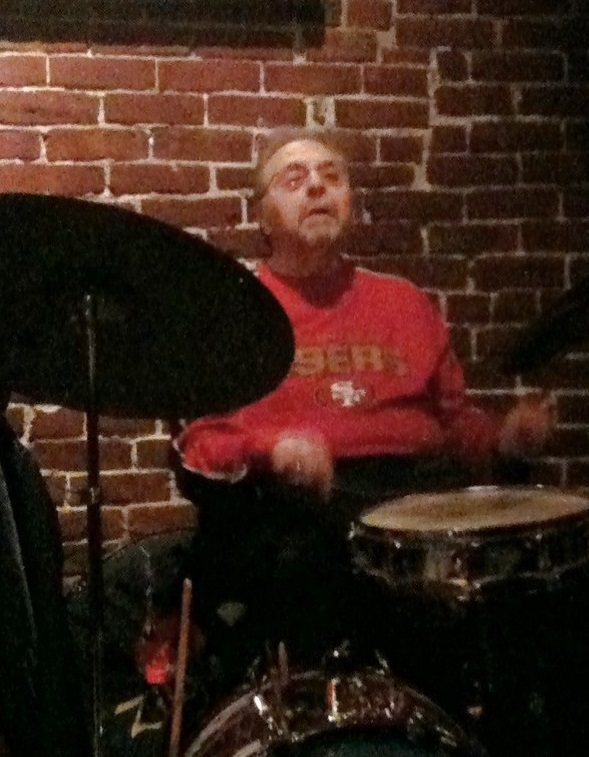
- Berk at Wilfs in 2009

Background information
- Born: Richard Alan Berk; May 22, 1939; San Francisco, California, U.S.
- Died: February 8, 2014 (aged 74) Portland, Oregon
- Genre: Jazz
- Occupation: Musician
- Instrument: Drums
- Years active: 1960s–2014
- Labels: Discovery, Trend, Reservoir, Nine Winds
- Website: www.dickberk.com

Richard Alan Berk (May 22, 1939 – February 8, 2014) was an American jazz drummer and bandleader.

== Career ==
A native of San Francisco, California, he studied at the Berklee College of Music and played in the Boston area early in the 1960s. In 1962 he moved to New York City and played with Ted Curson and Bill Barron in a quintet from 1962 to 1964. Following this he played with Charles Mingus, Mose Allison, Freddie Hubbard, and Walter Bishop, Jr., among others. He moved to Los Angeles late in the 1960s, where he played with Milt Jackson, Frank Rosolino, George Duke, Cal Tjader, Jean-Luc Ponty, and Blue Mitchell. He founded the Jazz Adoption Agency in the early 1980s, playing into the 2000s; the group included Andy Martin, Mike Fahn, Nick Brignola, Jon Nagorney, Keith Saunders, Tad Weed, and John Patitucci.

He died in 2014 at the age of 74.

== Discography ==
=== As leader ===
- Rare One (Discovery, 1983)
- Big Jake (Discovery, 1984)
- More Birds Less Feathers (Discovery, 1986)
- Music of Rodgers & Hart (Trend, 1988)
- Let's Cool One (Reservoir, 1991)
- Bouncin' With Berk (Nine Winds, 1991)
- East Coast Stroll (Reservoir, 1993)
- One by One (Reservoir, 1995)

=== As sideman ===
With Walter Bishop, Jr.

- Bish Bash (Xanadu, 1964 [1975])

With Ted Curson

- Tears for Dolphy, (Fontana, 1964)
- Flip Top (Freedom, 1964 [1977])
- The New Thing & the Blue Thing (Atlantic, 1965)

With Don Friedman

- Flashback (Riverside, 1963)
- Dreams and Explorations (Riverside, 1964)

With Milt Jackson

- That's the Way It Is (Impulse!, 1969)
- Just the Way It Had to Be (Impulse!, 1969)

With Jean Luc Ponty-George Duke

- The Jean Ponty Experience with the George Duke Trio (EMI, 1969)

With Blue Mitchell

- Stablemates (Candid, 1977)

With Cal Tjader

- Tjader (Fantasy, 1971)
- Agua Dulce (Fantasy, 1971)
- Live at The Funky Quarters (Fantasy, 1972)
- Puttin It Together (Fantasy, 1973)
- Last Bolero in Berkeley (Fantasy, 1973)
- Tambu (Fantasy, 1974)
- Last Night When We Were Young (Fantasy, 1975)
