= Larry Marshall (actor) =

American actor and singer (born 1943)

- Born: April 3, 1943 (age 83); Spartanburg, South Carolina, U.S.
- Education: Fordham University; Xavier University, Louisiana; New England Conservatory
- Occupations: Actor; Singer
- Years active: 1966–present
- Spouse: Jeannine Otis

Larry Marshall (born April 3, 1943) is an American actor and singer. He is known for his work in musical theatre and film.

== Early life and education ==
Marshall was born in 1943 in Spartanburg, South Carolina, and raised in South Carolina and New York. As a child, he created a doo-wop group called the Dell Chords with other kids in the neighborhood. He later studied at Fordham University, Xavier University, and the New England Conservatory of Music.

== Career ==
During junior year at the New England Conservatory, Marshall won a chorus role in Porgy and Bess, which he toured internationally. After graduation, he continued to perform in the opera, touring nationally and on Broadway, eventually earning Tony and Drama Desk award nominations for his portrayal of Sportin' Life. He continued to play this role into the 1990s. Marshall's other Broadway appearances include Two Gentlemen of Verona, The Full Monty, and The Color Purple. He also performed in the New York Shakespeare Festival.

Marshall's film roles include Cab Calloway in The Cotton Club and Simon Zealotes in Jesus Christ Superstar. Calloway praised Marshall's portrayal of him in The Cotton Club. In the 2015 documentary Superstars, Marshall reunited with fellow Jesus Christ Superstar cast members, including Ted Neeley (who produced the documentary), Yvonne Elliman, and Josh Mostel.

== Personal life ==
Larry lives on Staten Island, in New York City, with his long-time partner, Jeannine Otis.

== Theatrical performances (selected) ==
Year	Title	Role	Notes
1968	Hair	Berger	
1971	Two Gentlemen of Verona	Valentine	
1976	Jesus Christ Superstar	Judas	
1976, 1983	Porgy and Bess	Sportin' Life	
1976	Rockabye Hamlet	Hamlet	
1981	Oh, Brother!	Revolutionary Leader	
1989	The Threepenny Opera	Tiger Brown	
1997	Play On!	Sweets	
2001-02	The Full Monty	Noah "Horse" T. Simmons	
2006	The Color Purple	Ol' Mister	
2008	Xanadu	Danny	
2011	The Music Man	Mayor Shinn	
2013	Pullman Porter Blues	Monroe	
2017	Waitress	Joe	
2017-18	Waitress	Joe	
2019-20	Waitress	Joe	
2022	Waitress	Joe	

== Filmography (selected) ==
Year	Title	Role	Notes
1971	Panic in Needle Park	Mickey	
1973	Jesus Christ Superstar	Simon Zealotes	
1984	The Cotton Club	Cab Calloway	
