= Snake Johnson =

Studio album by Ted Curson
- Released: 1981
- Recorded: 1980
- Genre: Jazz
- Length: 42:44
- Label: Chiaroscuro CR-2028
- Producer: John R. Rowland

Ted Curson chronology
I Heard Mingus (1980)	Snake Johnson (1981)	Traveling On (1996)

Snake Johnson is an album by trumpeter Ted Curson, recorded in 1980 and released on the Chiaroscuro label.

== Reception ==
Professional ratings
Review scores
Source	Rating
AllMusic	3/5 stars
The Rolling Stone Jazz Record Guide	2/5 stars

AllMusic awarded the album 3 stars, with its review by Scott Yanow stating: "Trumpeter Ted Curson plays his own interpretations of advanced hard bop on this somewhat obscure LP".

== Track listing ==
All compositions by Ted Curson

1. "Snake Johnson" - 7:25
2. "Searching for the Blues" - 5:33
3. "Blue Piccolo" - 10:40
4. "Dwackdo Mun Fudalik" - 7:01
5. "Marjo" - 6:40
6. "LSD, Take a Holiday" - 5:25

== Personnel ==
- Ted Curson - trumpet, piccolo trumpet, flugelhorn
- Charlie Williams - alto saxophone
- Bill Barron - tenor saxophone
- Nick Brignola - baritone saxophone, soprano saxophone
- Jim McNeely - piano
- David Friesen- bass
- Steve McCall - drums
- Lawrence Killian - percussion
