= Burn Brigade =

Studio album by Nick Brignola
- Released: 1980
- Recorded: June 19, 1979
- Studio: Master Sound Productions, Franklin Square, NY
- Genre: Jazz
- Length: 39:16
- Label: Bee Hive Records BH 7010
- Producer: Jim Neumann, Susan Neumann

Nick Brignola chronology
| New York Bound (1978) | Burn Brigade (1980) | L.A. Bound (1979) |

Burn Brigade is an album by baritone saxophonist Nick Brignola which was recorded in 1979 and released on the Bee Hive label.

== Reception ==
Professional ratings
Review scores
| Source | Rating |
|---|---|
| AllMusic | 3/5 stars |

The AllMusic review by Scott Yanow stated, "Three of the greatest baritone saxophonists of the post-1970 period teamed up for this jam-session date ... The music is often quite exciting (the horns battle each other to a draw) and is easily recommended to fans of the bebop baritone sax".

== Track listing ==
| No. | Title | Writer(s) | Length |
|---|---|---|---|
| 1. | "Nick Who's Blues" | Nick Brignola | 6:54 |
| 2. | "I'm Getting Sentimental Over You" | George Bassman, Ned Washington | 6:30 |
| 3. | "Busy B's" | Brignola | 5:54 |
| 4. | "Groovin' High" | Dizzy Gillespie | 10:34 |
| 5. | "Our Delight" | Tadd Dameron | 9:24 |
| Total length: | | | 39:16 |

== Personnel ==
- Nick Brignola, Ronnie Cuber (tracks 1, 3 & 5), Cecil Payne (tracks 1, 3 & 4) – baritone saxophone
- Walter Davis Jr. – piano (tracks 1 & 3–5)
- Walter Booker – bass
- Jimmy Cobb – drums
