= Plenty of Horn (Ted Curson album) =

Studio album by Ted Curson
- Released: 1961
- Recorded: April 11, 1961
- Studio: Bell Sound (New York City)
- Genre: Jazz
- Length: 40:06
- Label: Old Town OTLP 2003
- Producer: Hy Weiss

Ted Curson chronology
Plenty of Horn (1961)	Ted Curson Plays Fire Down Below (1962)

Plenty of Horn is the debut album by American trumpeter Ted Curson which was first released on the Old Town label in 1961.

== Reception ==
Professional ratings
Review scores
Source	Rating
Allmusic	4/5 stars

Allmusic awarded the album 4 stars.

== Track listing ==
All compositions by Ted Curson except as indicated

1. "Caravan" (Duke Ellington, Irving Mills, Juan Tizol) - 2:59
2. "Nosruc" - 6:23
3. "The Things We Did Last Summer" (Sammy Cahn, Jule Styne) - 4:29
4. "Dem's Blues" - 3:45
5. "Ahma (See Ya)" - 4:24
6. "Flatted Fifth" - 3:37
7. "Bali Ha'i" (Oscar Hammerstein II, Richard Rodgers) - 4:00
8. "Antibes" - 5:07
9. "Mr. Teddy" - 5:15

== Personnel ==
- Ted Curson - trumpet
- Eric Dolphy - flute (tracks 3 & 7)
- Bill Barron - tenor saxophone (tracks 1, 2, 4–6, 8 & 9)
- Kenny Drew - piano
- Jimmy Garrison - bass
- Pete La Roca (tracks 2, 4, 8 & 9), Dannie Richmond (tracks 3 & 7), Roy Haynes (tracks 1, 5 & 6) - drums
