= Pertti Jalava =

Finnish composer

- Born: 1960; Turku, Finland
- Era: 21st century, contemporary

Pertti Jalava (born 1960) is a Finnish composer who has written numerous works for various chamber ensembles choral groups and orchestra, including five symphonies and a piano concerto. He wrote music for jazz and big band line-ups. Stylistically he keeps these genres separate, he does allow influences to travel between the two.

== Career ==
Jalava studied composition almost entirely on his own. In 1993, having already created an extensive repertoire influenced by jazz and classical music for his jazz ensembles, he studied theatre composition with the American Craig Bohmler on a six-month course run by the Finnish Music Theatre Association. As his final assignment he composed a chamber opera called Paradise. Having completed this course, a turning point in his career, Jalava embarked on an intensive course of private study and attended composition laboratories held by the Turku Philharmonic Orchestra and the University of Turku in 1994, 1996 and 1998.

Pertti Jalava won a number of prizes in Finnish and international composition competitions with works for string orchestra, wind orchestra, chamber ensemble, jazz ensemble and big band. Works by him have been performed by many orchestras and ensembles in Finland and abroad. He has been a full-time composer since 2001.

A Finnish record label Alba released "In The Wind" with four of Jalava's works for string orchestra and soloists (piano and flute) to positive reviews.

== Themes ==
Jalava lists his primary objectives as emotional and narrative expression. He uses strong contrasts, thereby achieving dramatic effects and aesthetic accents. He uses distorted harmonies, sharp timbres and aggressive rhythms. Rhythm occupies a major role in Jalava's music. It is often motor-like and frequently asymmetric.

Despite drawing mainly on twelve-note techniques, most of Jalava's classical works create a feeling of tonality. In his later compositions he often lets their nature determine the music or employs other methods of his own devising, assigning row technique only a secondary role.

== See also ==
- Finnish jazz musicians
- Music of Finland
