= Blues in Trinity =

Studio album by Dizzy Reece
- Released: Early June 1959
- Recorded: August 24, 1958
- Studios: Decca Studios, London
- Genre: Hard bop
- Length: 47:21
- Labels: Blue Note; BLP 4006
- Producer: Tony Hall

Dizzy Reece chronology
Changing the Jazz at Buckingham Palace (1956)	Blues in Trinity (1959)	Star Bright (1959)

Blues in Trinity is an album by Jamaican-born England-based jazz trumpeter Dizzy Reece, recorded on August 24, 1958 and released on Blue Note the following year—his debut for the label.

== Background ==
Unusually for Blue Note releases of this time, Blues in Trinity was recorded in north London rather than Rudy Van Gelder's Hackensack Studio, at which the label recorded exclusively from 1953 onwards.

== Reception ==
Professional ratings
Review scores
Source	Rating
AllMusic	4.5/5 stars

The AllMusic review by Stephen Thomas Erlewine states, "Although the band was thrown together, there's a definite spark to this combo, which interacts as if it had been playing together for a long time. Throughout it all, Reece steals the show with his robust playing, and that's why Blues in Trinity rises above the level of standard-issue hard bop and becomes something special."

Richard Cook described the session as a fine Anglo-American collaboration, with Reece demonstrating 'outstanding' qualities as a soloist and 'overshadowing' Donald Byrd. Cook also highlights Tubby Hayes as overshadowing Byrd with his 'quick and hearty' performance, a sentiment supported by Hayes's biographer, Simon Spillett, who describes Hayes "as technically dazzling as Johnny Griffin and as full of heavyweight clout as [...] Sonny Rollins".

Blues in Trinity is considered by some to be a "bop classic" and among Reece's best work.

== Track listing ==
All compositions by Dizzy Reece except as indicated

=== Side 1 ===
1. "Blues in Trinity" – 6:45
2. "I Had the Craziest Dream" (Gordon, Warren) – 3:04
3. "Close-Up" – 10:38

=== Side 2 ===
1. "Shepherd's Serenade" – 6:36
2. "Color Blind" – 6:02
3. "'Round About Midnight" (Monk) – 4:46

=== 1995 CD reissue bonus tracks ===
7. "Eboo" – 4:02
8. "Just a Penny" – 5:28

== Personnel ==
=== Musicians ===
- Dizzy Reece (except "'Round About Midnight")
- Donald Byrd ("Close-Up", "Color Blind", "Eboo", "Just a Penny") – trumpet
- Tubby Hayes – tenor saxophone (except "I Had the Craziest Dream")
- Terry Shannon – piano
- Lloyd Thompson – bass
- Art Taylor – drums

=== Technical personnel ===
- Tony Hall – producer, liner notes
- Rudy Van Gelder – recording engineer
- Reid Miles – design
- Bill Penny – photography
