= Asia Major =

Asia Major may refer to:

- Asia Major, a former name for the land east of Anatolia (Asia Minor)
- Asia Major (journal), an academic journal on Chinese history

== See also ==
- Asia Minor (disambiguation)
