= Legacy (Ronnie Mathews album) =

Studio album by Ronnie Mathews
- Released: 1980
- Recorded: September 21, 1979
- Studio: Master Sound Productions, Franklin Square, NY
- Genre: Jazz
- Length: 42:28
- Label: Bee Hive Records BH 7011
- Producer: Jim Neumann, Susan Neumann

Ronnie Mathews chronology
Roots, Branches & Dances (1978)	Legacy (1980)	Song for Leslie (1980)

Legacy is an album by pianist Ronnie Mathews which was recorded in 1978 and released on the Bee Hive label.

== Reception ==
Professional ratings
Review scores
Source	Rating
AllMusic	3/5 stars

The AllMusic review by Scott Yanow stated, "Pianist Ronnie Mathews assembled an all-star group for this hard bop set. Mathews had long been a distinctive but underrated player and is heard in prime form on a varied program ... The musicians all live up to their potential".

== Track listing ==
No.	Title	Writer(s)	Length
1.	"Legacy"	Tex Allen	8:48
2.	"A Child Is Born"	Thad Jones, Alec Wilder	5:48
3.	"Once I Loved"	Antônio Carlos Jobim, Vinícius de Moraes	6:16
4.	"Ichi Ban"	Ronnie Mathews	4:58
5.	"Suicide Is Painless"	Johnny Mandel, Mike Altman	6:16
6.	"Loose Suite"	Mathews	5:37
7.	"Four for Nothing"	Allen	4:45
Total length:			42:28

== Personnel ==
- Ronnie Mathews – piano
- Bill Hardman – trumpet (tracks 1, 3-5 & 7)
- Ricky Ford – tenor saxophone (tracks 1, 3-5 & 7)
- Walter Booker – bass (tracks 1 & 3–7)
- Jimmy Cobb – drums (tracks 1 & 3–7)
