= Comin' On! =

Studio album by Dizzy Reece
- Released: 1999
- Recorded: April 3 and July 17, 1960; Van Gelder Studio, Englewood Cliffs, NJ
- Genre: Jazz
- Length: 66:31
- Label: Blue Note
- Producer: Alfred Lion

Dizzy Reece chronology
Star Bright (1959)	Comin' On! (1999)	Soundin' Off (1960)

Comin' On! is an album by Jamaican-born jazz trumpeter Dizzy Reece, featuring performances recorded at two sessions in 1960, but not released on the Blue Note label until 1999.

== Reception ==
Professional ratings
Review scores
Source	Rating
Allmusic	4/5 stars

The Allmusic review by Al Campbell stated: "Neglected, although spirited, sessions from an underrated trumpeter and composer".

== Track listing ==
All compositions by Dizzy Reece except as indicated

1. "Ye Olde Blues" - 6:40
2. "The Case of the Frightened Lover" - 5:42
3. "Tenderly" (Walter Gross, Jack Lawrence) - 9:02
4. "Achmet" - 8:28
5. "The Story of Love" (Carlos Eleta Almarán) - 10:09
6. "Sands" - 6:40
7. "Comin' On" - 6:44
8. "Goose Dance" - 6:49
9. "The Things We Did Last Summer" (Jule Styne, Sammy Cahn) - 6:17
- Recorded at Van Gelder Studio, Englewood Cliffs, New Jersey on April 3 (tracks 1–5) and July 17 (tracks 6–9), 1960

== Personnel ==
- Dizzy Reece - trumpet, conga
- Stanley Turrentine - tenor saxophone
- Musa Kaleem - tenor saxophone, flute (tracks 6–9)
- Bobby Timmons (tracks 1–5), Duke Jordan (tracks 6–9) - piano
- Jymie Merritt (tracks 1–5), Sam Jones (tracks 6–9) - bass
- Art Blakey (tracks 1–5), Al Harewood (tracks 6–9) - drums
