= Juicy Lucy (Sal Salvador album) =

Studio album by Sal Salvador All Star Quintet featuring Billy Taylor
- Released: 1979
- Recorded: September 5, 1978
- Studios: Master Sound Productions, Franklin Square, NY
- Genre: Jazz
- Length: 43:22
- Label: Bee Hive Records BH 7009
- Producers: Jim Neumann, Susan Neumann

Sal Salvador chronology
Starfingers (1978)	Juicy Lucy (1979)	Parallelogram (1978)

Juicy Lucy is an album by guitarist Sal Salvador which was recorded in 1978 and released on the Bee Hive label.

== Reception ==
Professional ratings
Review scores
Source	Rating
AllMusic	4/5 stars
DownBeat	4.5/5 stars

The AllMusic review by Scott Yanow stated, " The well-conceived set has swinging versions of two of Salvador's originals, Taylor's "Daddy-O" and three standards. "Tune For Two" (an intense Salvador-Morello duet) and the medium-tempo blues "Northern Lights" are highlights of the enjoyable set".

== Track listing ==
No.	Title	Writer(s)	Length
1.	"Opus de Funk"	Horace Silver	11:03
2.	"Daddy-O"	Billy Taylor	7:41
3.	"Tune for Two"	Sal Salvador	3:55
4.	"Northern Lights"	Salvador	9:00
5.	"Juicy Lucy"	Silver	6:14
6.	"For All We Know"	J. Fred Coots, Sam M. Lewis	5:29
Total length:			43:22

== Personnel ==
- Sal Salvador – guitar
- Billy Taylor – piano (tracks 1, 2 & 4–6)
- Art Davis – bass (tracks 1, 2 & 4–6)
- Joe Morello – drums
