= Dizzy Reece =

Jamaican jazz trumpeter (born 1931)

- Born: Alphonso Son Reece; 5 January 1931 (age 95); Kingston, Jamaica
- Genres: Bebop; Hard bop; Spiritual jazz
- Occupation: Trumpeter

Alphonso Son "Dizzy" Reece (born 5 January 1931) is a Jamaican-born jazz trumpeter. Reece emerged within London's burgeoning bebop jazz scene during the 1950s and went on to become a leading proponent of hard bop jazz in New York City.

He later experimented with other jazz sub-genres in the late 1960s and 1970s, and continues to remain active in performance and composition. Reece's contribution to the jazz idiom is considered influential and he is often identified as one of jazz's great trumpet players.

== Biography ==
Reece was born on 5 January 1931 in Kingston, Jamaica, the son of a silent film pianist. He attended the Alpha Boys School, known for its musical alumni, studying alongside Joe Harriot and Wilton 'Bogey' Gaynair. Reece began learning trumpet when he was 14 years old and soon became a full-time musician at the age of 16. He moved to London in 1948 as part of the Windrush Generation, arriving on board the Empire Windrush on June 22 with hundreds of his Caribbean compatriots. Initially failing to establish himself in London, Reece spent the early 1950s working in mainland Europe, notably Paris. During this time he performed tirelessly, often with expatriate US jazz musicians, including Don Byas, Kenny Clarke, Frank Foster and Thad Jones.

By 1954 Reece had returned to London reinvigorated and began cultivating a stellar jazz reputation, performing regularly at The Flamingo Club, London's leading bebop venue. Reece's talents were noticed by the club compere, Tony Hall, who was also responsible for A&R at Decca Records. In 1955 Hall assumed responsibility for overseeing the revival of Decca's subsidiary, Tempo, quickly recording, producing, and issuing sessions by Reece, as well as many of his London contemporaries, such as Tubby Hayes and Victor Feldman. During this time Reece led several jazz recording sessions, including A New Star and Progress Report, and featured as a sideman on numerous other sessions. He also began exploring scoring for motion picture soundtracks, notably the Ealing Studios crime film, Nowhere to Go.

In 1958 Hall recorded what became Reece's first Blue Note album, secured through arrangement with Alfred Lion and Hall's successful licensing of Reece's session. This session was later issued by Blue Note in 1959 as Blues in Trinity and featured Reece and Tubby Hayes alongside Art Taylor and Donald Byrd. The appearance of Reece, as well as Hayes, on a Blue Note recording raised the profile of the British jazz scene, and garnered musical respect for Reece from jazz musicians such as Miles Davis and Sonny Rollins. On the basis of Blues in Trinity both Reece and Tubby Hayes were "short-listed" by Art Blakey for possible membership of the Jazz Messengers. Although both declined, Reece briefly appeared with the Jazz Messengers for live performances and made a guest appearance on the Africaine sessions, assisting with percussion. Hall subsequently orchestrated Reece's signing to Blue Note, whereupon Reece settled in New York City and recorded several sessions, including Star Bright, Comin' On!, and Soundin' Off.

Reece's appearances at the leading New York jazz clubs of the time such as The Village Vanguard, Birdland, and Eddie Condon's, as well as his association with Blue Note, brought him into close musical contact with many of the leading musicians of the era. Throughout the 1960s and 1970s Reece therefore featured as a sideman on recordings by Duke Jordan, Hank Mobley, Andrew Hill, Dexter Gordon, Philly Joe Jones, Dizzy Gillespie, and Clifford Jordan among others.

Upon departing the Blue Note label, Reece next recorded Asia Minor for the New Jazz Records imprint. Asia Minor is sometimes considered one of Reece's finest and was received positively in contemporaneous reviews. But it prompted an era of relative quiet from Reece, and it is often felt that Reece's relocation to New York did not have the desired positive effect on his career progression. Though Reece continued to perform throughout the 1960s and 1970s, his recorded appearances were sporadic, leading The New York Times to describe him as 'the elusive trumpeter'. Reece did not produce another solo record in the 1960s, instead concentrating on his sideman dates and his composing, the latter of which included the creation of the Contemporary Jazz Drum Suite (1966), a piece written entirely for percussion. His relative obscurity was something Reece himself has noted in interviews, citing local prejudice and discrimination as a particular factor in his low profile. In 2004 he told Jazz Times that many in New York disapproved of his interracial marriage, a factor which precipitated his marriage breakdown, whereupon his wife returned to England with their children. Reece's West Indian heritage was also a source of discrimination and resentment from within New York's jazz fraternity. Such prejudice arose from the complex inter-cultural relationships arising between West Indians and native black Americans, but has been described by Reece and others, such as Max Roach, as hypocritical since many supposed 'local' musicians came from West Indian households and were first generation Americans. Said Reece:

"You had to call out some of these cats, some of them were born over there, the West Indies, and some went home to West Indian families, Brooklyn was all West Indians, Max [Roach], Ernie Henry, Cecil Paine, Randy [Weston], Scoby [Stroman], they all had West Indian connections. In Brooklyn, they had their own thing going."

Reece was not entirely inactive in pursuing solo projects during this period and in 1968 demonstrated early experimentation with spiritual jazz with, Nirvana - The Zen of the Jazz Trumpet. However, this session went unreleased until 2006 and his principal playing was instead on sideman dates for the likes of Hank Mobley, Dexter Gordon, and Andrew Hill.

Reece was busier with his solo work in the 1970s, during which time recorded four albums, including Manhattan Project, which featured his best friend, saxophonist Clifford Jordan. Prior to this Reece issued From In to Out, a live recording demonstrating his experimentation with avant-garde and free jazz and featuring John Gilmore, Art Taylor, and French musicians Siegfried Kessler and Patrice Caratini. Reece continued his experimental themes in 1977 with two sessions from 1972 and 1973, both which were combined and released as Possession, Exorcism, Peace, notable for featuring an interpretation of Tubular Bells.

From the 1980s onward Reece concentrated on live performance, making few recorded studio appearances. Archived recordings of his live performances during this era have been curated and released. In a 2024 interview, Reece reaffirmed his dedication to composing, performing several of his recent compositions during interview. Many of these compositions have been recorded, though most currently remain unreleased. Reece has also engaged in autobiographical writing and curates numerous live recordings arising from the NYC Jazz Festival, an event he helped to establish in 1979. A prolific writer, Reece has penned numerous articles about jazz music, including a substantial biographical history of jazz saxophonists.

== Influence ==
Reece's contribution to the jazz idiom is considered influential and he is often identified as one of jazz's great trumpet players.

Reece was recipient of the 'Award of Recognition' from Festival of New Trumpet Music (FONT Music) in 2023.

== Discography ==
=== As leader ===
- Top Trumpets - Dizzy Blows Bird / Deuchar Plays Deuchar (Tempo, 1956) with Jimmy Deuchar
- Changing The Jazz At Buckingham Palace (Savoy Records, 1957) with Tubby Hayes
- A New Star (Tempo, 1955–56) with Phil Seamen
- Progress Report (Tempo, 1956–58) with Victor Feldman, Tubby Hayes
- Blues in Trinity (Blue Note, 1959)
- Star Bright (Blue Note, 1960)
- Comin' On! (Blue Note, 1960 [1999])
- Soundin' Off (Blue Note, 1960)
- Asia Minor (New Jazz, 1962)
- Nirvana: The Zen of the Jazz Trumpet (Jazz Vision 1968 [2006])
- From In to Out - (Futura, 1970)
- Possession, Exorcism, Peace (Honey Dew, 1974)
- Manhattan Project (Bee Hive, 1978)
- Blowin' Away (Interplay, 1978) with Ted Curson
- Dealing Vol. I (JazzVision Records, 1981 [2014])
- Dealing Vol. II (JazzVision Records, 1982 [2014])

=== Compilations ===
- Mosaic Select: Dizzy Reece (MS-011) - compiles Blues in Trinity (1958), Star Bright (1959), Soundin' Off (1960), and Comin' On! (1960).

=== As sideman ===
With Art Blakey & The Jazz Messengers

- Africaine (Blue Note, 1959 [1998])

With Tony Crombie And His Orchestra

- Presenting Tony Crombie No.1 (Decca Records, 1955)

With Victor Feldman

- Victor Feldman Septet (Tempo, 1955)
- Suite Sixteen (Contemporary, 1955 [1958])
- In London Vol. 2 Big Band (Tempo, 1957)
- Transatlantic Alliance (Tempo, 1958)

With Dizzy Gillespie

- The Dizzy Gillespie Reunion Big Band (MPS, 1968)

With Dexter Gordon

- A Day in Copenhagen (MPS, 1969)

With Tubby Hayes And His Orchestra

- Modern Jazz Scene, 1956 (Tempo, 1956)

With Andrew Hill

- Passing Ships (Blue Note, 1969)

With Philly Joe Jones

- Round Midnight (Lotus, 1969 [1980])

With The In-Town Jazz Group

- Progressive Jazz (Decca Records, 1955 [1961])

With Clifford Jordan

- Inward Fire (Muse, 1978)
- Play What You Feel (Mapleshade, 1990 [1997])
- Down Through the Years (Milestone, 1991)

With Duke Jordan

- Flight to Jordan (Blue Note, 1960)

With Art Matthews

- It's Easy To Remember (Mantra, 1979)

With Hank Mobley

- The Flip (Blue Note, 1969)

With Gerry van der Klei

- Multifaced Gerry (Poker, 1975)
