= Ted Curson Plays Fire Down Below =

Studio album by Ted Curson
- Released: 1963
- Recorded: December 10, 1962
- Studio: Van Gelder, Englewood Cliffs, New Jersey
- Genre: Jazz
- Length: 30:44
- Label: Prestige PRLP 7263
- Producer: Ozzie Cadena

Ted Curson chronology
Plenty of Horn (1961)	Ted Curson Plays Fire Down Below (1963)	Tears for Dolphy (1964)

Ted Curson Plays Fire Down Below is an album by American trumpeter Ted Curson, recorded in 1962 and released on the Prestige label.

== Reception ==
Professional ratings
Review scores
Source	Rating
AllMusic	4.5/5 stars
The Penguin Guide to Jazz Recordings	3/4 stars

The AllMusic review by Scott Yanow stated, "The main fault of this otherwise superior CD reissue is that there are only 31 minutes of music... Curson, 27 at the time, is heard in top form on one of the very few of his sessions to be reissued ".

== Track listing ==
1. "Fire Down Below" (Lester Lee, Ned Washington) - 4:36
2. "The Very Young" (Harold Little, Herb Sacker) - 4:39
3. "Baby Has Gone Bye Bye" (Robert Allen, Allan Roberts) - 4:38
4. "Show Me" (Alan Jay Lerner, Frederick Loewe) - 4:26
5. "Falling in Love with Love" (Lorenz Hart, Richard Rodgers) - 5:29
6. "Only Forever" (Johnny Burke, James V. Monaco) - 6:56

== Personnel ==
- Ted Curson - trumpet
- Gildo Mahones - piano
- George Tucker - bass
- Roy Haynes - drums
- Montego Joe - congas
