= Tears for Dolphy =

Studio album by Ted Curson
- Released: 20 December 1964
- Recorded: 1 August 1964
- Genre: Jazz
- Length: 61:24 (CD)
- Label: Fontana (LP); Black Lion (CD)
- Producer: Alan Bates

Ted Curson chronology
Ted Curson Plays Fire Down Below (1962)	Tears for Dolphy (1964)	The New Thing & the Blue Thing (1965)

Alternative cover
- Black Lion CD release

Tears for Dolphy is a 1964 album by jazz trumpeter Ted Curson. The album's title track, an elegy for Eric Dolphy (who died at the end of June that year), has been used in many films.

== Reception ==
Professional ratings
Review scores
Source	Rating
AllMusic	4.5/5 stars
Christgau's Record Guide	B+
The Penguin Guide to Jazz	3.5/4 stars
The Rolling Stone Jazz Record Guide	4/5 stars

Brian Morton and Richard Cook, writing for The Penguin Guide to Jazz, give Tears for Dolphy a favorable review, noting "a raw sorrow in the title tune," a robust rhythm section, and the leader's "high, slightly old-fashioned sound." Earlier editions of The Penguin Guide to Jazz give the album a rating of three-and-a-half stars.

Chuck Berg, writing for DownBeat, said Curson and saxophonist Bill Barron's "tough, but highly melodic lines above the steady and crisp rhythmic substructure ably provided by bassist Herb Bushler and drummer Dick Berk."

Scott Yanow of AllMusic asserts that most tracks "manage to be both explorative and surprisingly accessible."

== Track listing ==
All tracks recorded on August 1, 1964.

1. "Kassim" (Ted Curson) – 7:41
2. "East 6th Street" (Bill Barron) – 5:38
3. "7/4 Funny Time" (Barron) – 5:28
4. "Tears for Dolphy" (Curson) – 8:32
5. "Quicksand" (Curson) – 6:39
6. "Reava's Waltz" (Curson) – 7:10

The Black Lion CD (1993) appends three tracks from the same recording session, but that originally appeared on the album Flip Top:

7. "Searching for the Blues" (Curson) – 7:47
8. "Desolation" (Barron) – 8:45
9. "Light Blue" (Barron) – 3:43

== Personnel ==
- Ted Curson – trumpet, pocket trumpet
- Bill Barron – tenor saxophone, clarinet
- Herb Bushler – double bass
- Dick Berk – drums
- Unidentified – percussion
- Alan Bates – producer, liner notes
