= The Trio (Ted Curson album) =

Studio album by Ted Curson
- Released: 1979
- Recorded: January 3, 1979
- Studio: RPM, New York City
- Genre: Jazz
- Length: 39:21
- Label: Interplay IP 7722
- Producer: Toshiya Taenaka

Ted Curson chronology
Blowin' Away (1978)	The Trio (1979)	I Heard Mingus (1980)

The Trio is an album by trumpeter Ted Curson, recorded in 1979 and first released on the Interplay label.

== Critical reception ==
Professional ratings
Review scores
Source	Rating
DownBeat	5/5 stars
The Rolling Stone Jazz Record Guide	4/5 stars

The Globe and Mail noted that it is "a volatile group, taking its tenor from the passionate trumpet and flugelhorn playing of leader Curson; his is a very human sound, its expressiveness heightened by the vocalized quality of the slurs and abrupt turns of his phrasing." The Bay State Banner panned the "sloppiness," writing that the album "sounds almost nightmarish in spots."

DownBeat reviewer Brent Staples wrote, "The order of the day on The Trio is open space... All of the cuts are solid".

== Track listing ==
All compositions by Ted Curson except where noted

1. "Snake Johnson" – 7:34
2. "Pent Up House" (Sonny Rollins) – 5:48
3. "Quicksand" – 6:42
4. "Straight Ice" – 9:11
5. "'Round About Midnight" (Bernie Hanighen, Thelonious Monk, Cootie Williams) – 10:06

== Personnel ==
- Ted Curson – trumpet, flugelhorn, piccolo trumpet, percussion
- Ray Drummond – bass
- Roy Haynes – drums
