= Manhattan Project (album) =

Studio album by Dizzy Reece
- Released: 1978
- Recorded: January 17, 1978
- Genre: Jazz
- Length: 47:16
- Label: Bee Hive

Dizzy Reece chronology
From In to Out (1970)	Manhattan Project (1978)	Blowin' Away (1978)

Manhattan Project is an album by Jamaican-born jazz trumpeter Dizzy Reece featuring performances recorded in 1978 and released on the Bee Hive label. In 2015, Mosaic Records included this recording in The Complete Bee Hive Sessions (Mosaic MD12-261), a 12-CD box set.

== Reception ==
Professional ratings
Review scores
Source	Rating
Allmusic	4.5/5 stars
The Rolling Stone Jazz Record Guide	4/5 stars

The Allmusic review by Scott Yanow awarded the album 4½ stars stating "Hopefully, this highly enjoyable Bee Hive LP will someday be rediscovered and reissued on CD".

== Track listing ==
All compositions by Dizzy Reece except as indicated

1. "Con Man" - 8:55
2. "Manhattan Walk" - 7:59
3. "Yule On The Hudson" - 9:05
4. "Woody 'n' You" (Dizzy Gillespie) - 13:20
5. "One For Trane" (Mickey Bass) - 7:57

- Recorded at Blue Rock Studio, N.Y.C. on January 17, 1978.

== Personnel ==
- Dizzy Reece - trumpet
- Clifford Jordan - tenor saxophone
- Charles Davis - tenor saxophone
- Albert Dailey - piano
- Art Davis - bass
- Roy Haynes - drums
