= The New Thing & the Blue Thing =

Studio album by Ted Curson
- Released: 1965
- Recorded: March 25 & 29, 1965, NYC
- Genre: Jazz
- Length: 35:35
- Label: Atlantic SD 1441
- Producer: Arif Mardin

Ted Curson chronology
Tears for Dolphy (1964)	The New Thing & the Blue Thing (1965)	Urge (1966)

The New Thing & the Blue Thing is an album by American trumpeter Ted Curson, recorded in 1965 and released on the Atlantic label.

== Reception ==
Professional ratings
Review scores
Source	Rating
AllMusic	3/5 stars
The Penguin Guide to Jazz Recordings	4/4 stars

JazzTimes stated, "Curson's soaring lines and brilliant trumpet sound are well-matched by Barron, who was at the top of his form on this date. Neither was really an avantgardist by 1965 standards, but both were interesting modern voices whose best work came when they were pushing the limits". Jazz Review said, "Most of this session is fairly straightahead hard-bop, played with great but unsurprising elan, recalling the Blue Note & Prestige glory days. But the last two tunes, 'Reava's Waltz' and 'Elephant Walk', Curson & Co. really soar with some fiery solos and some jagged, volatile Mingus-inspired writing and ensemble playing".

== Track listing ==
All compositions by Ted Curson except as indicated

1. "Straight Ice" - 5:36
2. "Star Eyes" (Gene de Paul, Don Raye) - 5:40
3. "Ted's Tempo" - 5:19
4. "Nu Blu" - 9:12
5. Reava's Waltz" - 4:18
6. "Elephant Walk" - 5:30

== Personnel ==
- Ted Curson - trumpet
- Bill Barron - tenor saxophone
- Georges Arvanitas - piano
- Herb Bushler - bass
- Dick Berk - drums
