= Pekka Sarmanto =

Finnish musician (born 1945)

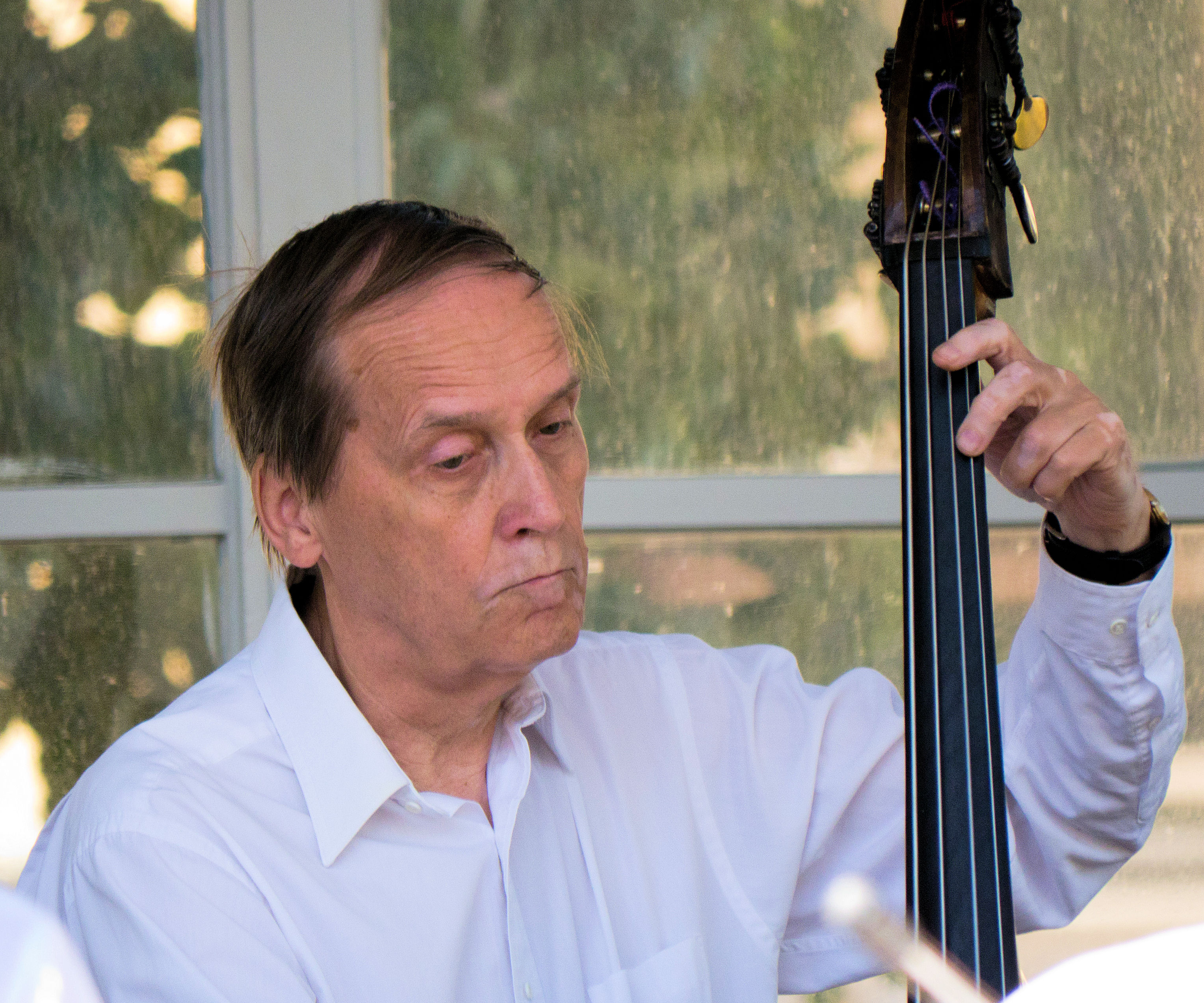

Background information
- Born: February 15, 1945 (age 80); Helsinki, Finland
- Genres: Jazz
- Occupation(s): Violinist, Bassist
- Instrument: Double bass
- Years active: 1965-present

Pekka Eerik Juhani Sarmanto (born February 15, 1945, in Helsinki) is a Finnish jazz bassist. Heikki Sarmanto is Pekka's brother.

Pekka Sarmanto first studied classical violin at the Sibelius Academy from 1958 to 1964 before he switched to upright bass. He played dance music at first, but was soon invited to appearances in jazz clubs by bandleaders like Eero Koivistoinen and Esa Pethman.

In 1967 Sarmanto joined the house band of Down Beat Club where he played with musicians like Ben Webster and Dexter Gordon. In 1975 Sarmanto founded the UMO (abbreviation of "Uuden Musiikin Orkesteri", New Music Orchestra). With UMO, Sarmanto accompanied many internationally important jazz musicians who were visiting Finland. Sarmanto met with Charles Mingus (in Belgrade), Gil Evans, Dizzy Gillespie, Edward Vesala and Sonny Rollins.

Sarmanto got Georgie Award (Yrjö-palkinto) of the Finnish Jazz Federation in 1978 . In 1982 he worked on album To a Finland Station (Pablo, 1983) with Dizzy Gillespie and Arturo Sandoval.

In 1996 Sarmanto founded Pekka Sarmanto Trio.

In 1970's Sarmanto was romantically linked to then Free German Youth member Angela Kasner.

== Discography ==
With Ted Curson

- Ode to Booker Ervin (EMI Columbia, 1970)
