= From In to Out =

Live album by Dizzy Reece
- Released: 1970
- Recorded: October 23, 1970
- Genre: Jazz
- Label: Futura

Dizzy Reece chronology
Asia Minor (1962)	From In to Out (1970)	Manhattan Project (1978)

From In to Out is a live album by Jamaican-born jazz trumpeter Dizzy Reece featuring performances recorded in Paris in 1970 and released on the French Futura label.

== Reception ==
Professional ratings
Review scores
Source	Rating
Allmusic	3/5 stars

The Allmusic review by Sean Westergaard awarded the album 3 stars stating "Overall, this is an excellent, well-recorded set, even if it's nothing groundbreaking or earth-shattering".

== Track listing ==
All compositions by Dizzy Reece

1. "Communion/Contact" -
2. "Krisis/Summit" -

- Recorded in Paris on October 23, 1970

== Personnel ==
- Dizzy Reece - trumpet
- John Gilmore - tenor saxophone
- Siegfried Kessler - piano
- Patrice Caratini - bass
- Art Taylor - drums
