= Blowin' Away (Dizzy Reece and Ted Curson album) =

Studio album by Dizzy Reece and Ted Curson
- Released: 1978
- Recorded: June 9, 1978
- Studio: Blue Rock, New York City
- Genre: Jazz
- Label: Interplay IP-7716
- Producer: Fred Norsworthy, Toshiya Taenaka

Ted Curson chronology
Jubilant Power (1976)	Blowin' Away (1978)	The Trio (1978)

Dizzy Reece chronology
Manhattan Project (1978)	Blowin' Away (1978)

Blowin' Away is an album by trumpeters Dizzy Reece and Ted Curson, recorded in 1976 and released on the Interplay label.

== Reception ==
Professional ratings
Review scores
Source	Rating
AllMusic	4/5 stars
The Rolling Stone Jazz Record Guide	4/5 stars
DownBeat	4.5/5 stars

AllMusic's review by Scott Yanow stated, "It is a pity that Reece and Curson do not get to tangle on all of the numbers, but they do shoot off some fireworks (most notably on 'Walkin''); the playing by all of the veterans is up to par".

DownBeat assigned the album 4.5 stars. Brent Staples wrote, "Blowin' Away has all the elements of an old time cuttin’ session: familiar tunes, a strong rhythm section and two roosters in the same barnyard. Curson and Reece seem intent upon blowing each other out of the studio".

== Track listing ==
1. "Stella by Starlight" (Victor Young, Ned Washington) - 6:13
2. "All The Things You Are" (Jerome Kern, Oscar Hammerstein II) - 6:16
3. "Bass Conclave" (Dizzy Reece) - 6:24
4. "Moose the Mooche" (Charlie Parker) - 5:11
5. "Marjo" (Ted Curson) - 6:50
6. "Walkin'" (Richard Carpenter) - 8:48

== Personnel ==
- Dizzy Reece - trumpet (tracks 1, 3, 5 & 6)
- Ted Curson - trumpet, flugelhorn (tracks 2, 3, 5 & 6)
- Claude Williamson - piano
- Sam Jones - bass
- Roy Haynes - drums
