= Blue Piccolo =

Studio album by Ted Curson
- Released: 1976
- Recorded: July 1, 1976
- Studio: Vanguard, New York City
- Genre: Jazz
- Length: 42:50
- Label: Whynot PA-7153
- Producer: Masahiko Yuh

Ted Curson chronology
Quicksand (1974)	Blue Piccolo (1976)	Jubilant Power (1976)

Blue Piccolo is an album by American trumpeter Ted Curson which was recorded in 1976 and first released on the Japanese Whynot label and the on India Navigation in the US as Ted Curson & Co.

== Reception ==
Professional ratings
Review scores
Source	Rating
AllMusic	4/5 stars
The Rolling Stone Jazz Record Guide	3/5 stars

AllMusic's Scott Yanow stated, "The distinctive trumpeter Ted Curson is well showcased on this LP... As usual his solos are both adventurous and (due to his appealing tone and roots in earlier styles of jazz) fairly accessible. Worth searching for".

== Track listing ==
All compositions by Ted Curson except as indicated

1. "All the Things You Are" (Oscar Hammerstein II, Jerome Kern) - 9:36
2. "Blue Piccolo" - 12:29
3. "Playhouse March" - 7:09
4. "Song of the Lonely" - 8:05
5. "Dwackdi Mun Fudalick" - 5:31

== Personnel ==
- Ted Curson - flugelhorn, trumpet, pocket trumpet
- Jim McNeely - piano
- Cecil McBee - bass
- Steve McCall - drums
