= Trident Records =

American jazz record label

Trident Records was a jazz label founded by Keno Duke, active from 1975-1982. Duke released two albums on Strata-East Records before starting Trident, and his label featured several Strata-East artists.

== Discography ==
- TRS-501: Keno Duke & Contemporaries - Crest Of The Wave (1975)
- TRS-502: Frank Strozier - Dance, Dance
- TRS-503: Ted Curson - (Typical Ted)
- TRS-504: Dick Griffin - Now Is The Time (1979)
- TRS-506: Harold Mabern - Pisces Calling
- TRS-507: Benny Powell - Coast to Coast (1982)
