= Roots, Branches & Dances =

Studio album by Ronnie Mathews
- Released: 1979
- Recorded: December 7, 1978
- Studio: Master Sound Productions, Franklin Square, NY
- Genre: Jazz
- Length: 41:16
- Label: Bee Hive Records BH 7008
- Producer: Jim Neumann, Susan Neumann

Ronnie Mathews chronology
Trip to the Orient (1975)	Roots, Branches & Dances (1979)	Legacy (1979)

Roots, Branches & Dances is an album by pianist Ronnie Mathews which was recorded in 1978 and released on the Bee Hive label.

== Reception ==
Professional ratings
Review scores
Source	Rating
AllMusic	3/5 stars
DownBeat	4/5 stars

The AllMusic review by Scott Yanow stated, "The music is essentially advanced hard bop with a few surprises tossed in. An intriguing set".

DownBeat assigned the album 4 stars. Reviewer Lee Jeske wrote, "I his is an out-and-out blowing session with a group of very strong and very compatible players . . . All in all, an admirable album. It’s a joy to hear a group of tight, professional jazzmen go into a studio and just kick ass".

== Track listing ==
No.	Title	Writer(s)	Length
1.	"Selima's Dance"	Ronnie Mathews	7:40
2.	"It Don't Mean a Thing"	Duke Ellington, Irving Mills	6:50
3.	"Hi-Fly"	Randy Weston	6:08
4.	"Thews' Blues"	Mathews	7:00
5.	"Susanita"	Ray Drummond	8:30
6.	"Reflections"	Thelonious Monk	5:08
Total length:			41:16

== Personnel ==
- Ronnie Mathews – piano
- Frank Foster – soprano saxophone, tenor saxophone
- Ray Drummond – bass
- Al Foster – drums
- Azzedin Weston – congas, percussion
