= Jeannine Otis =

American singer, educator and music director

Jeannine Otis, also known as Jahneen, is an American singer, educator and music director.

== Early life and education ==
At the age of 16, she was accepted early to Wellesley College, where she was the first African-American to be a Presser Music Scholar. She earned a BA in Sociology and Musicology. She went on to earn an MA in Theater Education and Performance at Emerson College, where she won a teaching fellowship.

== Career ==
She has performed with Kool and the Gang, the Shirelles, Grover Washington Jr., Eliot Goldenthal, Pete Seeger and many leading hip-hop artists. She has worked in theater with Galt MacDermot, Liz Swados and Robert Lupone.

She wrote a book published by Seabury Press, titled The Gathering, based on her work with imprisoned teenagers. The Gathering has been turned into a theatrical performance. She worked with the New York City Department of Education as an Arts in Education evaluator.

She has toured extensively in productions of Porgy and Bess.

She received a Lifetime Achievement Award from The City Council of New York, the St. Mark's Griffin Outreach Award, the William A. Morris Award from the NAACP, and a Reggie for her Staten Island appearance in The Cradle Will Rock (which she also performed in Manhattan).

She has performed at the Staten Island Jazz Festival for many years, at the Empowering Voices Dinner Gala hosted by Illuminart Productions in 2018.

Currently, she is a Warner European recording artist, has been music director for St. Marks Church-in-the-Bowery for 25 years, an outreach/education coordinator for the Staten Island Museum, and president and consultant for Light of Mine Productions.

She collaborated with Heikki Sarmanto on Magic Song.

== Personal life ==
Jeannine lives on Staten Island in New York City with her long-time partner, Larry Marshall.
