= Cattin' Curson =

Live album by Ted Curson
- Released: 1975
- Recorded: October 26, 1973
- Venue: Bilboquet, Paris, France
- Genre: Jazz
- Length: 41:49
- Label: Marge MARGE 01
- Producer: Gérard Terronès

Ted Curson chronology
Pop Wine (1971)	Cattin' Curson (1975)	Quicksand (1974)

(Typical Ted) cover

Cattin' Curson is a live album by American trumpeter Ted Curson which was recorded in Paris in 1973 and first released on the French Marge label and on Trident in the United States as (Typical Ted).

== Reception ==
Professional ratings
Review scores
Source	Rating
AllMusic	3/5 stars

AllMusic awarded the album 3 stars.

== Track listing ==
All compositions by Ted Curson

1. "Flatted 5th" - 8:00
2. "Marjo" - 6:00
3. "Airi Tune" - 8:30
4. "Searchin' the Blues" - 9:10
5. "Typical Ted (Cattin' Curson)" - 9:30

== Personnel ==
- Ted Curson – trumpet, bugle, piccolo trumpet
- Chris Woods – alto saxophone, flute
- Georges Arvanitas – piano
- Jacky Samson – bass
- Charles Saudrais – drums
