= Soundin' Off =

Studio album by Dizzy Reece
- Released: Mid October 1960
- Recorded: May 12, 1960
- Studio: Van Gelder Studio; Englewood Cliffs, New Jersey
- Genre: Jazz
- Length: 41:50
- Label: Blue Note; BLP 4033
- Producer: Alfred Lion

Dizzy Reece chronology
Comin' On! (1960)	Soundin' Off (1960)	Asia Minor (1962)

Soundin' Off is an album by Jamaican-born jazz trumpeter Dizzy Reece recorded on May 12, 1960 and released on Blue Note later that year.

== Reception ==
Professional ratings
Review scores
Source	Rating
AllMusic	4/5 stars

The AllMusic review by Rick Anderson says, "Throughout the album, Reece digs into his bag of sonic tricks without ever doing anything that detracts from the music itself. Soundin' Off is a little bit uneven, but is never less than a solid pleasure to listen to."

== Track listing ==
=== Side 1 ===
1. "A Ghost of a Chance" (Bing Crosby, Ned Washington, Victor Young) – 5:06
2. "Once in a While" (Michael Edwards, Bud Green) – 7:30
3. "Eb Pob" (Fats Navarro) – 7:46

=== Side 2 ===
1. "Yesterdays" (Otto Harbach, Jerome Kern) – 7:11
2. "Our Love Is Here to Stay" (George Gershwin, Ira Gershwin) – 6:21
3. "Blue Streak" (Dizzy Reece) – 7:56

== Personnel ==
=== Musicians ===
- Dizzy Reece – trumpet
- Walter Bishop Jr. – piano
- Doug Watkins – bass
- Art Taylor – drums

=== Technical personnel ===
- Alfred Lion – producer
- Rudy Van Gelder – recording engineer
- Reid Miles – cover design
- Francis Wolff – photography
- Ira Gitler – liner notes
