= Star Bright (Dizzy Reece album) =

Studio album by Dizzy Reece
- Released: March 1960
- Recorded: November 19, 1959
- Studio: Van Gelder Studio; Englewood Cliffs
- Genre: Hard bop
- Length: 39:31
- Label: Blue Note; BLP 4023
- Producer: Alfred Lion

Dizzy Reece chronology
Blues in Trinity (1958)	Star Bright (1960)	Comin' On! (1960)

Star Bright is an album by Jamaican jazz trumpeter Dizzy Reece recorded on November 19, 1959, shortly after his move to New York City, and released on Blue Note the following year.

== Reception ==
Professional ratings
Review scores
Source	Rating
AllMusic	4.5/5 stars
AllAboutJazz	4/5 stars

The AllMusic review awarded the album 4½ stars.

== Track listing ==
All compositions by Dizzy Reece except as indicated

=== Side 1 ===
1. "The Rake" – 6:06
2. "I'll Close My Eyes" (Kaye, Reid) – 5:57
3. "Groovesville" – 8:08

=== Side 2 ===
1. "The Rebound" – 6:48
2. "I Wished on the Moon" (Dorothy Parker, Ralph Rainger) – 6:51
3. "A Variation on Monk" – 5:41

== Personnel ==
=== Musicians ===
- Dizzy Reece – trumpet
- Hank Mobley – tenor saxophone
- Wynton Kelly – piano
- Paul Chambers – bass
- Art Taylor – drums

=== Technical personnel ===
- Alfred Lion – production
- Rudy Van Gelder – recording engineer, mastering
- Reid Miles – design
- Francis Wolff – photography
- Leonard Feather – liner notes
