= Pop Wine =

Studio album by Ted Curson
- Released: 1971
- Recorded: June 18, 1971
- Studio: Europasonor, Paris, France
- Genre: Jazz
- Length: 43:25
- Label: Futura GER 26
- Producer: Gérard Terronès

Ted Curson chronology
Ode to Booker Ervin (1970)	Pop Wine (1971)	Cattin' Curson (1973)

Pop Wine is an album by American trumpeter Ted Curson, recorded in France and first released on the Futura label in 1971.

== Reception ==
Professional ratings
Review scores
Source	Rating
AllMusic	4/5 stars
The Penguin Guide to Jazz Recordings	3/4 stars

AllMusic called the album "one of those very special dates where everything seems to go right" and stated that "noteworthy are Curson's compositions here that, like much music of their time, leave tradition to the dust. He engages it and the blues in a sort of modal inquiry, where he wraps extant ideas about form, tonal sonance, and intervallic architecture in a phraseology and compositional elegance that was beyond most of his peers".

== Track listing ==
All compositions by Ted Curson

1. "Pop Wine" - 5:09
2. "L.S.D. Takes a Holiday" - 12:43
3. "Lonely One" - 5:46
4. "Quartier Latin" - 13:18
5. "Flip Top" - 6:33

== Personnel ==
- Ted Curson - trumpet, piccolo trumpet
- Georges Arvanitas - piano
- Jacky Samson - bass
- Charles Saudrais - drums
