= Poinciana (Nick Brignola album) =

Studio album by Nick Brignola
- Released: 1997
- Recorded: April 24, 1997
- Studio: Van Gelder Studio, Englewood Cliffs, NJ
- Genre: Jazz
- Length: 65:25
- Label: Reservoir
- Producer: Mark Feldman

Nick Brignola chronology
Flight of the Eagle (1996)	Poinciana (1997)	All Business (1998)

Poinciana is an album by baritone saxophonist Nick Brignola which was recorded in 1997 and released on the Reservoir label.

== Reception ==
Professional ratings
Review scores
Source	Rating
AllMusic	4/5 stars
The Penguin Guide to Jazz Recordings	2.5/4 stars

The AllMusic review by Mark Romano said "these are the best renderings of a true baritone sax artist. The title cut on this album is worth the price of admission alone ... unforgettable and to be reckoned with. There's hard bop and swing here, too ... Brignola had an uncanny ability to combine his muscular phrasing with a supreme sensitivity. Nick Brignola never got the recognition that he deserved while alive, which is common with jazz musicians. But that doesn't mean that their work won't live forever in the form of recorded music. Highly recommended for jazz fans and listeners who want to go beyond musical categories". In JazzTimes, Sid Gribetz noted "Brignola plays with staggering virility and facile expertise on the sometimes cumbersome bari, and he produces a sound that is silky smooth and possessed of honest emotion".

== Track listing ==
1. "Poinciana" (Nat Simon, Buddy Bernier) – 6:18
2. "Well, You Needn't" (Thelonious Monk) – 8:20
3. "Sign Post" (Phil Markowitz) – 5:36
4. "What'll I Do" (Irving Berlin) – 5:10
5. "April Mist" (Tom Harrell) – 6:13
6. "I Don't Stand a Ghost of a Chance with You" (Victor Young, Bing Crosby, Ned Washington) – 8:18
7. "Upper Manhattan Medical Group" (Billy Strayhorn) – 7:59
8. "Airegin" (Sonny Rollins) – 5:55
9. "When You Wish Upon a Star" (Leigh Harline, Ned Washington) – 4:33
10. "Outside In" (Nick Brignola) – 6:39

== Personnel ==
- Nick Brignola – baritone saxophone
- Phil Markowitz – piano, Korg X5 synthesizer
- Steve LaSpina – bass
- Billy Hart – drums
- Café – percussion (tracks 1, 5 & 9)
