= Starfingers =

Studio album by Sal Salvador
- Released: 1978
- Recorded: March 24, 1978
- Studio: Blue Rock Studios, NYC
- Genre: Jazz
- Length: 48:24
- Label: Bee Hive Records BH 7002
- Producer: Jim Neumann, Fred Norsworthy

Sal Salvador chronology
| Music to Stop Smoking By (1964) | Starfingers (1978) | Juicy Lucy (1978) |

Starfingers is an album by guitarist Sal Salvador that was recorded in 1978 and released on the Bee Hive label.

== Reception ==
Professional ratings
Review scores
| Source | Rating |
|---|---|
| AllMusic | 4/5 stars |
| DownBeat | 4/5 stars |

The AllMusic review by Scott Yanow stated: "After years of low-profile teaching and playing, guitarist Sal Salvador started to re-emerge on a more national basis in 1978. ... An excellent modern bop album."

== Track listing ==
| No. | Title | Writer(s) | Length |
|---|---|---|---|
| 1. | "Nica's Dream" | Horace Silver | 12:56 |
| 2. | "Darn That Dream" | Jimmy Van Heusen, Eddie DeLange | 4:56 |
| 3. | "Sometime Ago" | Sergio Mihanovich | 6:34 |
| 4. | "Zone Two" | Sal Salvador | 6:42 |
| 5. | "Don't Get Around Much Anymore" | Duke Ellington, Bob Russell | 6:06 |
| 6. | "Blue Gnu's Blues" | Salvador | 11:10 |
| Total length: | | | 48:24 |

== Personnel ==
- Sal Salvador – guitar
- Eddie Bert – trombone (tracks 1, 3, 4 & 6)
- Nick Brignola – baritone saxophone (tracks 1, 3, 4 & 6)
- Derek Smith – piano
- Sam Jones – bass
- Mel Lewis – drums
