= The New York Jazz Quartet in Chicago =

Studio album by Roland Hanna
- Released: 1982
- Recorded: July 27, 1981
- Studio: P.S. Studios, Chicago IL
- Genre: Jazz
- Length: 38:57
- Label: Bee Hive Records BH 7013
- Producer: Jim Neumann, Susan Neumann

Roland Hanna chronology
Oasis (1981)	The New York Jazz Quartet in Chicago (1982)	Romanesque (1982)

The New York Jazz Quartet in Chicago is an album by pianist Roland Hanna and the New York Jazz Quartet which was recorded in 1981 and released on the Bee Hive label.

== Reception ==
Professional ratings
Review scores
Source	Rating
AllMusic	4/5 stars

The AllMusic review by Scott Yanow stated, "The New York Jazz Quartet gave pianist Roland Hanna, Frank Wess (doubling on tenor and flute), bassist George Mraz and drummer Ben Riley an opportunity to collaborate and, although the group did not develop any innovations, it did record several excellent albums. This Bee Hive album is one of their more extroverted affairs".

== Track listing ==
No.	Title	Writer(s)	Length
1.	"Four the Hard Way"	Frank Wess	8:56
2.	"Wisteria"	George Mraz	4:16
3.	"Raise a Ruckus"	Roland Hanna	6:20
4.	"H & T Blues"	Thad Jones	7:07
5.	"Ain’t Nothin’ New"	Jones	3:51
6.	"You Don't Know What Love Is"	Gene de Paul, Don Raye	8:27
Total length:			38:57

== Personnel ==
- Roland Hanna – piano
- Frank Wess – tenor saxophone, flute
- George Mraz – bass
- Ben Riley – drums
