= Ode to Booker Ervin =

Studio album by Ted Curson & Co.
- Released: 1970
- Recorded: September 3, 1970
- Studio: Finnvox Studios, Helsinki, Finland
- Genre: Jazz
- Label: EMI Columbia 5E 062-34201

Ted Curson chronology
Flip Top (1964-66)	Ode to Booker Ervin (1970)	Pop Wine (1971)

Ode to Booker Ervin is an album by American trumpeter Ted Curson which was recorded in Helsinki and first released on the Finnish EMI Columbia label in 1970. The album features Curson with a band composed of local Finnish jazz musicians. The album is dedicated to tenor saxophonist Booker Ervin who died at the end of August 1970, a few days before the recording session.

== Reception ==
Professional ratings
Review scores
Source	Rating
Allmusic	3/5 stars

Allmusic awarded the album 3 stars.

== Track listing ==
All compositions by Ted Curson except as indicated

1. "Ode to Booker Ervin" - 2:07
2. "LSD Takes Holiday" - 5:43
3. "Airi's Tune" - 7:41
4. "Montreux" (Pentti Hietanen) - 6:38
5. "Festival Blue" (Hietanen) - 6:43
6. "Typical Ted" - 7:05
7. "The Leopard" - 8:31

== Personnel ==
- Ted Curson - trumpet, pocket trumpet
- Eero Koivistoinen - alto saxophone, tenor saxophone, soprano saxophone
- Pentti Hietanen - piano, electric piano
- Pekka Sarmanto - bass
- Reino Laine - drums
