= Quicksand (Ted Curson album) =

Studio album by Ted Curson
- Released: 1976
- Recorded: May 13 & 16, 1974
- Studio: Atlantic Recording Studios, New York City
- Genre: Jazz
- Length: 48:04
- Label: Atlantic P-7532A
- Producer: Michael Cuscuna

Ted Curson chronology
Cattin' Curson (1973)	Quicksand (1976)	Blue Piccolo (1976)

Quicksand is an album by American trumpeter Ted Curson which was recorded in 1974 and released on the Atlantic label.

== Track listing ==
All compositions by Ted Curson

1. "Spiderlegs" - 7:50
2. "Tears for Dolphy" - 8:12
3. "Typical Ted" - 7:21
4. "Greasy as a Porkchop" - 5:56
5. "Sugar 'n' Spice" - 6:55
6. "Quicksand" - 11:50

== Personnel ==
- Ted Curson - trumpet, piccolo trumpet
- Robin Kenyatta - alto saxophone, soprano saxophone
- Nick Brignola - baritone saxophone, tenor saxophone, saxello
- Kenny Barron - piano, electric piano
- Herb Bushler - bass, electric bass
- Albert Heath - drums
- Butch Curson - drums, percussion
- Lawrence Killian - congas, bell tree
- Chicky Johnson - bongos, timbales
