= I Heard Mingus =

Studio album by Ted Curson
- Released: 1980
- Recorded: January 5, 1980
- Studio: Sound Ideas Studio, New York City
- Genre: Jazz
- Length: 36:20
- Label: Interplay IP 7729
- Producer: Toshiya Taenaka

Ted Curson chronology
The Trio (1979)	I Heard Mingus (1980)	Snake Johnson (1980)

I Heard Mingus is an album by trumpeter Ted Curson which was recorded in 1980 and first released on the Interplay label.

== Track listing ==
All compositions by Ted Curson except as indicated

1. "I Heard Mingus" - 9:04
2. "Please, Please, Please Don't Put the Pigsfoot in the Kreplach Soup" - 9:15
3. "Lost Her" - 10:01
4. "Lin's Garden" (Ted Curson, Graham Collier) - 8:00

== Personnel ==
- Ted Curson - trumpet, flugelhorn, piccolo trumpet, percussion
- Bill Saxton - tenor saxophone (tracks 2 & 4)
- Mike Morgenstern - baritone saxophone (tracks 2 & 4)
- Jim McNeely - piano (tracks 2–4)
- Ryo Kawasaki - guitar
- Mike Richmond - bass, electric bass
- Adam Nussbaum - drums
- Montego Joe - percussion (track 2 & 4)
