= Tour de Force (Nick Brignola album) =

Studio album by Nick Brignola
- Released: February 26, 2002
- Recorded: 2001
- Genre: Jazz
- Label: Reservoir Records

Nick Brignola chronology
All Business (1999)	Tour de Force (2002)	Things Ain't What They Used To Be (2003)

Professional ratings
Review scores
Source	Rating
The Penguin Guide to Jazz Recordings	3.5/4 stars

Tour de Force is the thirteenth studio album by saxophonist Nick Brignola. The album was released 18 days after his death on February 26, 2002.

== Track list ==
All compositions by Nick Brignola.

1. Backwoods Song – 7:38
2. Local Motion – 8:09
3. Donna Lee – 5:02
4. In Your Own Street Way – 7:52
5. Centerpiece – 7:41
6. "Labyrinth" – 6:38
7. "V.I." – 6:45
8. "I Should Care" – 4:27
9. "Indigo Rays" – 4:57

== Personnel ==
- Nick Brignola – baritone saxophone
- Chuck D'Aloia – guitar
- Eddie Gómez – bass
- Bill Stewart – drums
- Café – percussion (tracks 1, 4 & 9)
