= Jubilant Power =

Studio album / Live album by Ted Curson & Company
- Released: 1976
- Recorded: October 16–17, 1976
- Venue: Rittenhouse Square, Philadelphia, PA
- Studio: Downtown Sound, NYC
- Genre: Jazz
- Length: 48:02
- Label: Inner City IC 1017
- Producer: Irv Kratka

Ted Curson chronology
| Blue Piccolo (1976) | Jubilant Power (1976) | Blowin' Away (1978) |

Jubilant Power is an album by American trumpeter Ted Curson. It has one side recorded live in Philadelphia and the other recorded in a New York studio the following day which was first released on the Inner City label in 1976.

== Reception ==
Professional ratings
Review scores
| Source | Rating |
|---|---|
| AllMusic | 4/5 stars |
| The Rolling Stone Jazz Record Guide | 3/5 stars |

AllMusic noted, "Ted Curson's Jubilant Power shows the modern jazz trumpeter in prime condition, very influenced by a stint with Charles Mingus, and exhorting his large ensemble to play music indicative of the title... Because Ted Curson produced far too few recordings, and because the band is excellent, this has to rank as one of his best efforts, his modern jazz still sounding vital and fresh".

== Track listing ==
All compositions by Ted Curson

1. "Reava's Waltz" - 12:00
2. "Ted's Tempo" - 9:00
3. "Song of the Lonely" - 7:40
4. "Airi's Tune" - 6:23
5. "Searchin' for the Blues" - 6:42
6. "Marjo" - 5:45

== Personnel ==
- Ted Curson - trumpet, flugelhorn, piccolo trumpet, cowbells
- Chris Woods - flute, alto saxophone
- Nick Brignola - baritone saxophone, saxello
- Andy LaVerne (tracks 1 & 2), Jim McNeely (tracks 3–6) - piano
- David Friesen - bass
- Steve McCall (tracks 1 & 2), Bob Merigliano (tracks 3–6) - drums
- Sam Jacobs - congas
