= Sir Elwoodin hiljaiset värit =

Finnish rock band

- Origin: Helsinki, Finland
- Genres: Rock
- Years active: 1989–present
- Members: Juha Lehti; Junnu Saaresaho; Arttu Leskinen; Jussi Virtanen; Puppe Luomanmäki
- Past members: Pete Loikala; Riku Järvinen; Hansu Saarinen
- Website: sirelwood.com

Sir Elwoodin hiljaiset värit is a Finnish rock band, hailing from the Helsinki suburb of Kannelmäki.

== History ==
The band was formed in 1989. Including Pete Loikala, they recorded their first demo tapes. Despite publishing records and touring regularly, they did not find major success until they released the single "Viimeisellä rannalla" (a homage to Nevil Shute's On the Beach) in 1993. They scored their largest success in 1998 with the compilation "Varjoja, varkaita ja vanhoja valokuvia", selling more than 30,000 records (in a country of only 5 million), earning them a gold record. On 13 June 2004, the band was hit hard when Riku Järvinen, their bassist and occasional violinist, died in an accident. After having found a replacement in Järvinen's friend Puppe Luomanmäki at the tribute concert, they decided to continue. After releasing a second "greatest hits" compilation in 2005, the band released a new single, "Suomineito", in 2006, and a new record in 2007.

They are renowned for a distinguished style with heavy basement jazz influences. Some of their more successful songs are cover versions with adapted lyrics of well known classics ("Älä itke" ("Don't cry") is Neil Young's "Don't Cry No Tears", "Kaduilla Kallion" ("In the streets of Kallio") originates with Tom Waits as "In The Neighbourhood"), but they also feature many of their own songs. Their lyrics are often touched by melancholy and relate to every-day issues.

The band has yet to officially reveal the answer to the frequently asked question, how they came up with their name (literally "The silent colours of Sir Elwood"), and whether it has any deeper meaning at all.

== Members ==
- Juha Lehti (vocals, guitar, harmonica, since 1988)
- Juha "Junnu" Saaresaho (keyboards, accordion, percussion, background vocals, since 1988)
- Arttu Leskinen (drums, percussion, since 1989)
- Jussi Virtanen (guitar, de facto since 1992, though officially only since 1997)
- Pekka "Puppe" Luomanmäki (bass guitar, since 2004)

=== Former members ===
- Pete Loikala (bass guitar 1988–1990)
- Jogi Kosonen (trumpet 1991)
- Hansu Saarinen (saxophone and "whatever was needed" 1991–2003)
- Riku Järvinen (bass guitar, violin, 1990–2004)

== Discography ==
- Varjoissa vapaan maailman (1991)
- Yö tekee meistä varkaat (1992)
- Kymmenen tikkua laudalla (1993)
- Puoli viisi aamulla (1995)
- Puunukke (1997)
- Pyhää kamaa (1999)
- Pohjoisesta tuulee taas (2001)
- 18. tammikuuta (2003)
- Sattuman kauppa (2007)
- Kaipuun vuosirenkaita (2010)

=== Compilations and live albums ===
- Varjoja, varkaita ja vanhoja valokuvia (1998) (Compilation)
- Ilta illan jälkeen (2002) (live)
- Varjoja, varkaita ja vanhoja valokuvia, osa 2 (2005) (Compilation & live)
- Varjoja, varkaita ja vanhoja valokuvia, osa 3 (2009) (Compilation & live)
- Varjoissa vapaan maailman (2011) (20 year jubileum live)
