= Nick Brignola =

American jazz baritone saxophonist (1936–2002)

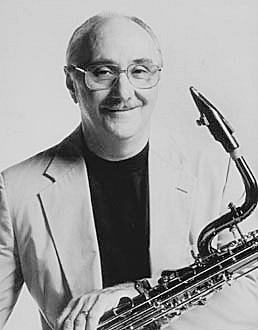

Background information
- Born: Nicholas Thomas Brignola; July 17, 1936; Troy, New York
- Died: February 8, 2002 (aged 65) Albany, New York
- Genres: Jazz
- Occupation: Musician
- Instruments: Saxophone, clarinet, flute

Nicholas Thomas "Nick" Brignola (July 17, 1936 – February 8, 2002) was an American jazz baritone saxophonist.

== Biography ==
Brignola was born on July 17, 1936, in Troy, New York. He was born into a musical family in which his father played the tuba and his uncle played the banjo. As a mostly self-taught musician, he developed his facility on all of his instruments using unconventional techniques, which gave his playing an unmatched fluidity. At the age of 11 he began playing the clarinet and in years to come he picked up the alto and tenor saxophones as well as the flute. At the age of 20 he dropped his alto saxophone off to be repaired, and the only horn the shop had to loan him was the baritone sax. After that, the baritone sax became his main, but not only instrument.

While studying education at Ithaca College in New York, Brignola and some of his fellow students made a recording, which won a 1957 DownBeat award for the best college group of the year. The award afforded the group of young musicians many opportunities including the recording of an album as well as performance at various festivals, and a performance at the Café Bohemia in Greenwich Village. In the DownBeat critics poll he was labeled a "new star". The newfound fame landed him with the Benny Goodman Scholarship to the Berklee College of Music in Boston, Massachusetts. During his time at Berklee he did a recording with the professor and musician Herb Pomeroy and forged relationships with lifelong musical friends including Dick Berk. Brignola did not have a long stay at Berklee though. His popularity launched him into the music scene and lead him to gig with many well established musicians.

In the 1960s Brignola toured with trumpeter Ted Curson, which gave him his initial international exposure. Brignola and Curson remained friends for the rest of Brignola's life. They reunited in the mid 1970s and played several gigs at the Tin Palace in New York City, where the group recorded their only album.

Also, in the mid 1970s, Brignola heard a group called Petrus at the Last Chance Saloon in Albany, New York. It was led by pianist Phil Markowitz with Gordon Johnson on bass, and Ted Moore on drums. The trio began at the Eastman School of music in Rochester, New York. They were a fusion oriented group influenced by Chick Corea. Brignola joined the group, which became known as Brignola and Petrus and while they never recorded, found a great deal of both popular and critical acclaim for their work together.

During this time, Brignola also played at the regular Sunday evening sessions that were held at the Ramada Inn in Schenectady, New York. It was there that he got to play with many of his favorite musicians such as Cecil Payne, Woody Shaw, Jon Faddis, Chet Baker and Bill Watrous. His connection with Watrous was especially fortuitous and they maintained contact for many years. He also played with dixieland/swing trumpet player Doc Cheatham.

Another highlight in Brignola's career was the Many Styles of Nick Brignola series, which had Brignola playing three distinctly different styles of jazz. The first set was a swing/dixie with such stars as Cheatham, Jimmy McPartland and Helen Humes. The second set was dedicated to bebop, with Chet Baker, Thad Jones and Jack Wilkins. His final set was with Petrus - his working group at the time, where they played both fusion and avant garde jazz. Two such performances were held at the Cohoes Music Hall in Cohoes, New York, and the final one at Page Hall in Albany.

Brignola also performed and released albums with many other musicians. He recorded the album Baritone Madness with one of his idols, Pepper Adams. He released several tribute albums with a cast of musicians paying respect to Gerry Mulligan and Lee Morgan. He played an integral role in the three-baritone sax band, which also played tribute to Mulligan. He recorded two sets at the Sweet-Basil Lounge in New York City with Randy Brecker and Claudio Roditi, and played alongside fellow baritone sax player Ronnie Cuber on the album Baritone Explosion with Rein DeGraff.

Brignola died of cancer on February 8, 2002.

== Discography ==
=== As leader ===
- This Is It! (Priam, 1967)
- Baritone Madness (Bee Hive, 1978)
- L.A. Bound (Sea Breeze, 1979)
- New York Bound (Interplay, 1979)
- Burn Brigade (Bee Hive, 1980)
- Signals...in from Somewhere (Discovery, 1983)
- Northern Lights (Discovery, 1984)
- Raincheck (Reservoir, 1988)
- On a Different Level (Reservoir, 1990)
- What it Takes (Reservoir, 1991)
- It's Time (Reservoir, 1992)
- Live at Sweet Basil First Set (Reservoir, 1993)
- Like Old Times (Reservoir, 1994)
- Nick Brignola & the Endangered Species (Hang, 1994)
- The Flight of the Eagle (Reservoir, 1996)
- Poinciana (Reservoir, 1998)
- Spring Is Here (Koch 1998)
- All Business (Reservoir, 1999)
- D.E.W. East Meets Nick Brignola (Cornerstone, 2001)
- Tour de Force (Reservoir, 2001)
- Things Ain't What They Used to Be (Reservoir, 2003)

=== As sideman ===
With Ted Curson

- Jubilant Power (Inner City, 1976)
- Quicksand (Atlantic, 1977)
- Snake Johnson (Chiaroscuro, 1981)

With Sal Salvador

- You Ain't Heard Nothin' Yet! (Dauntless, 1963)
- Starfingers (Bee Hive, 1978)
- In Our Own Sweet Way (Stash, 1983)
- Plays Gerry Mulligan (Stash, 1985)

With others

- Dick Berk, More Birds Less Feathers (Discovery, 1986)
- Dick Berk, Music of Rodgers & Hart (Trend, 1993)
- David Friesen, Waterfall Rainbow (Inner City, 1977)
- Woody Herman, Woody Herman 1964 (Philips, 1964)
- Frank Mantooth, Sophisticated Lady (Sea Breeze, 1995)
- Mingus Dynasty, Live at the Theatre Boulogne-Billancourt/Paris, Vol. 1 (Soul Note, 1989)
- Mingus Dynasty, Live at the Theatre Boulogne-Billancourt/Paris, Vol. 2 (Soul Note, 1993)
- Tisziji Munoz, Live Again! At Page Hall with Nick Brignola (Anami Music, 1994)
- Sal Nistico, Neo/Nistico (Bee Hive, 1978)
- Claudio Roditi, Free Wheelin (Reservoir, 1994)
- Phil Woods, Evolution (Concord, 1988)
- Phil Woods, Real Life (Chesky, 1991)
- Tony Purrone, "In The Heath Zone" (SteepleChase ,1997)
