= UMO Jazz Orchestra =

Finnish big band

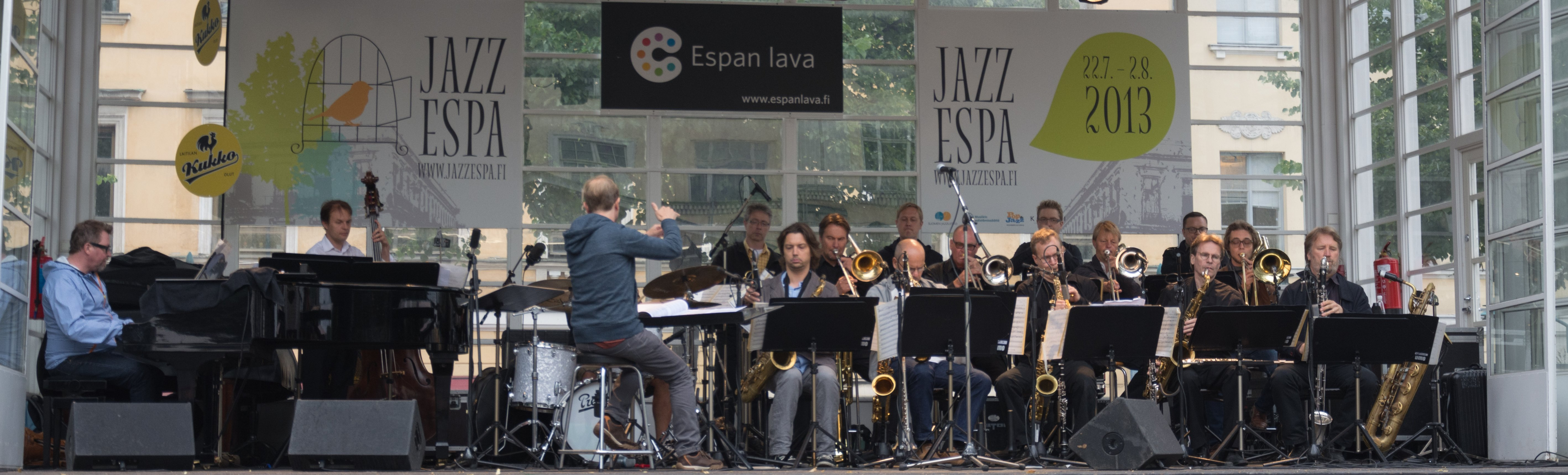
UMO Jazz Orchestra

UMO Jazz Orchestra is a Finnish big band. It was founded in 1975 by jazz musicians Heikki Sarmanto and Esko Linnavalli.

UMO is an abbreviation of "Uuden Musiikin Orkesteri" (New Musical Orchestra). Since 1984 UMO has been a professional orchestra which is financed by Finnish Broadcasting Company, Finnish Ministry of Education and Culture and the city of Helsinki.

UMO has been toured in Europe, Canada, and the U.S. and has worked with Dexter Gordon, Dizzy Gillespie, Gil Evans, Mercer Ellington, McCoy Tyner, Maria Schneider, Michael Brecker, John Scofield, and Lenny Pickett.

== History ==
UMO Jazz Orchestra (Finnish: Uuden Musiikin Orkesteri, lit. “New Music Orchestra”) was founded in 1975 in Helsinki by jazz musicians Heikki Sarmanto and Esko Linnavalli as a platform for large ensemble jazz in Finland. The ensemble grew out of a desire to create a permanent big band that could perform both traditional and contemporary jazz repertoire, addressing a gap in the Finnish jazz scene at that time. UMOn first concert was performed at the Pori Jazz Festival on 12 July 1975.

Originally operating as a part-time ensemble, UMO transitioned to a full-time professional orchestra in 1984, supported by the Finnish Broadcasting Company, the Ministry of Education and Culture, and the City of Helsinki. This institutional backing positioned UMO as Finland’s principal professional jazz orchestra and enabled extensive touring, recording, and commissioning of new works.

UMO’s repertoire has reflected a commitment to innovation and new music, encompassing jazz, rhythm-based contemporary compositions, and genre-crossing collaborations. The orchestra’s library now encompasses thousands of works, spanning big band arrangements by Finnish and international composers.

== Collaborations and International Activity ==
Early in its history, UMO established collaborations with a range of internationally recognized jazz artists. The orchestra toured extensively across Europe, Canada, and the United States, showcasing its work alongside leading figures in jazz.

In 1977, UMO recorded the album Thad Jones, Mel Lewis and UMO with American bandleaders Thad Jones and Mel Lewis in Helsinki; the recording was subsequently nominated for a Grammy Award in the Best Jazz Instrumental Performance – Big Band category in 1979.

Over the decades, the orchestra has worked with numerous prominent artists, including Dizzy Gillespie, Dexter Gordon, McCoy Tyner, Maria Schneider, and Michael Brecker. It has also collaborated with contemporary vocalists and soloists across genres.

== Performances and Role in Jazz Education ==
UMO typically performs around 80–100 concerts annually, both in Finland and internationally, at jazz festivals, concert halls, and cultural events. Its programming bridges traditional big band jazz with contemporary works and genre-blending projects, engaging audiences across styles and age groups.

The orchestra has also served as an important training ground for Finnish jazz musicians: each season, numerous composers, arrangers, and performers work with UMO, contributing to its creative output and educational mission.

== Awards and Recognition ==
Throughout its history, UMO has received multiple Yrjö and Emma awards, recognizing its contributions to Finnish jazz. The ensemble’s Grammy nomination also reflects its international impact and stature.

== 50th Anniversary ==
From summer 2025 through spring 2026, UMO celebrates its 50th anniversary season, reflecting on five decades of performances, recordings, and artistic development. Anniversary programming highlights both historical milestones and new music, reaffirming UMO’s role as a leading jazz orchestra in Finland and beyond.

== Recordings ==
UMO has released over 60 albums since the 1970s, documenting its evolving sound and collaborations. Its discography includes recordings that highlight both original compositions and performances with guest artists. Notable releases include the Grammy-nominated Thad Jones, Mel Lewis and UMO (1978) and several projects with international jazz figures.

== Discography ==
- Our Latin Friends (1976)
- A Good Time Was Had By All (1976)
- Thad Jones, Mel Lewis & UMO (1978)
- Umophilos (1979)
- Sea Suite Effoa (1983)
- Ultima Thule (1983)
- Bad Luck, Good Luck (1985)
- UMO New Music Orchestra Plays the Music of Koivistoinen & Linkola (1985)
- Passions of a Man – Kalevala Fantasy (1987)
- Green & Yellow (1987)
- UMO Plays the Music of Muhal Richard Abrams (1989)
- The First Seven – UMO Plays BAT Jazz in Finland (1992)
- Live in Helsinki 1995 (1995)
- One More Time with Kenny Wheeler and Norma Winstone (2000)
- Transit People (2001)
- Counting on the Count – UMO Jazz Orchestra plays Count Basie (2004)
- Sauna palaa! (2005)
- Mister Blues with Pepe Ahlqvist (2006)
- The Sky Is Ruby with Raoul Björkenheim (2007)
- Agatha with Kerkko Koskinen (2007)
- Taikapeitto with Satu Sopanen (2008)
- UMO on UMO (2009)
- Primal Mind – UMO Plays the Music of Raoul Björkenheim, Live in Helsinki 1991 (2010)
- Beauty and the Beast – UMO plays the music of Pekka Pohjola, Live & Studio 1977–2004 (2010)
- A Good Time Was Had By All 1976 – 1979 (2010)
- Rytmihyrrä – Eläinlauluja lapsille/Rytmyra – Djursånger för barn with Emma Salokoski (2011)
- Supermusic (with Nils Landgren & Viktoria Tolstoy, 2012)
