= Flip Top =

Studio album / Live album by Ted Curson
- Released: 1977
- Recorded: August 1, 1964 and Summer 1966; Studio Acousti, Paris, France and Yugoslavia Jazz Festival, Ljubljana, Yugoslavia
- Genre: Jazz
- Label: Freedom FLP 41030
- Producer: Alan Bates

Ted Curson chronology
Urge (1966)	Flip Top (1977)	Ode to Booker Ervin (1970)

Flip Top is an album by American trumpeter Ted Curson which has one side recorded in the studio in 1964 at the same sessions that produced Tears for Dolphy and one side recorded live at the Seventh Yugoslavia Jazz Festival in Ljubljana which was first released on the Freedom label in 1977.

== Reception ==
Professional ratings
Review scores
Source	Rating
AllMusic	4/5 stars
The Rolling Stone Jazz Record Guide	4/5 stars

AllMusic awarded the album 4 stars calling it "A recommended and consistently stimulating release".

== Track listing ==
All compositions by Ted Curson except as indicated

1. "Searching for the Blues - 7:47
2. "Desolation" (Bill Barron) - 8:45
3. "Light Blue" (Barron) - 3:43
4. "Quicksand" - 6:09
5. "Straight Ice" - 4:53
6. "Flip Top" - 4:14

== Personnel ==
- Ted Curson - trumpet
- Bill Barron - tenor saxophone (tracks 1–3)
- Herb Bushler - bass (tracks 1–3)
- Dick Berk - drums (tracks 1–3)
- Zagreb Radio Orchestra conducted by Miljenko Prohaska and arranged by Zita Carno (tracks 4–6). The conductor Prohaska is erroneusly listed as Trohaska on the Album Cover.
