= Dave Lindholm =

Finnish guitarist and singer-songwriter (born 1952)

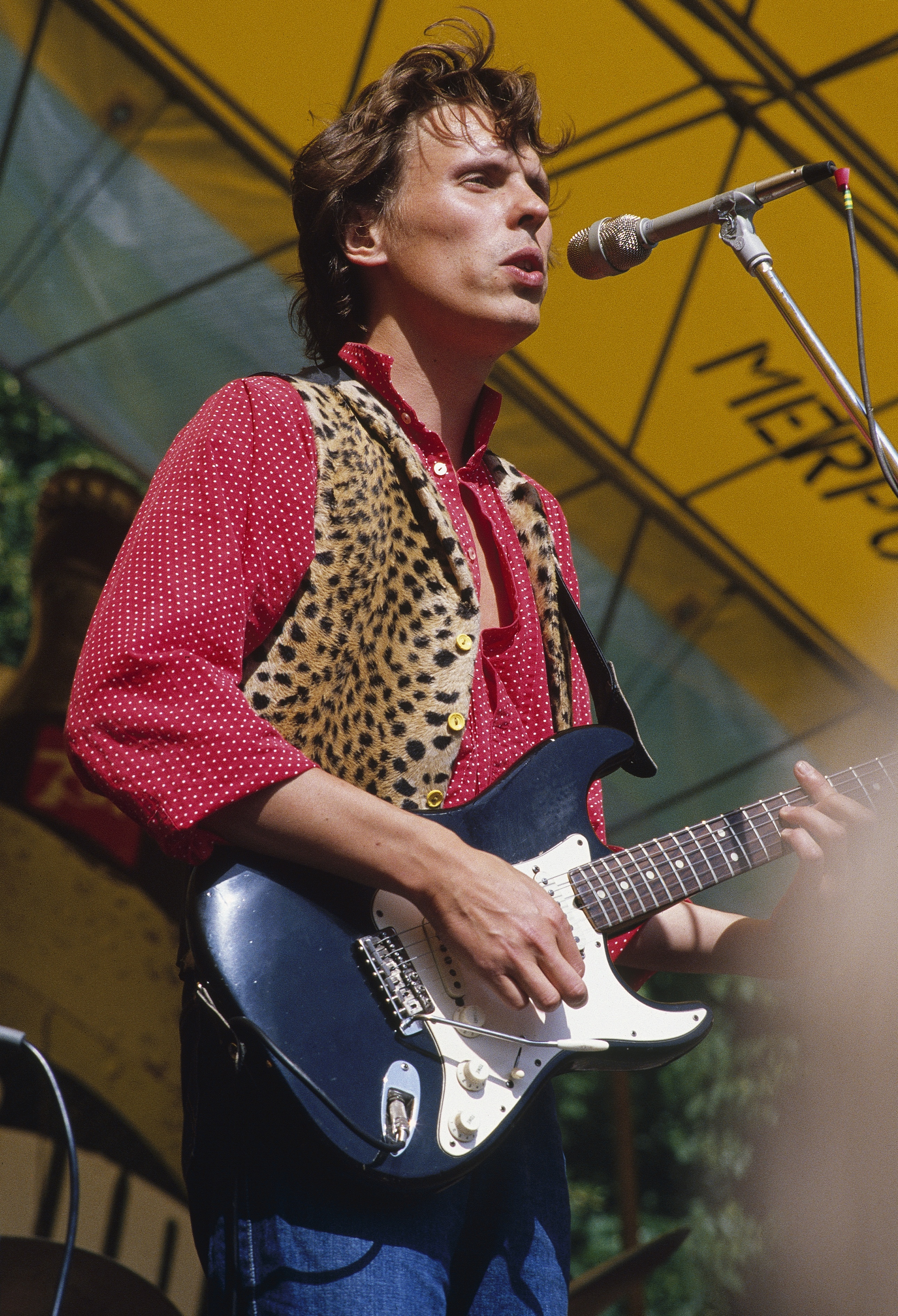
Dave Lindholm in 1980s

Ralf-Henrik "Dave" Lindholm (born 31 March 1952, Helsinki) is a Finnish guitarist and singer-songwriter who has made a career under his own name and also participated in some noteworthy groups. He has written songs and recorded in both Finnish and English.

Lindholm's first recordings were made with his band Ferris that published its sole recording in 1971 through the Love Records label. He wanted to record for Love Records also as a solo artist and suggested that "Great Pen Lee" would be his new stage name. The record label however persuaded him to use the name "Isokynä" (trans. "big pen") and to sing in Finnish or Swedish instead of English. Thus he recorded two albums in Finnish in years 1972 and 1973. Especially the second LP Sirkus, is considered to be one of the most important Finnish rock albums.

In 1975 he established a group that performed in English. He named the group simply the Rock 'n' Roll Band. The band only released one album. Probably the best-known and themost covered Dave Lindholm hit is the 1975 Rock’n Roll Band. single I’m Gonna Roll. He also had a hit with Pen Lee & Co single Do I Have To Throw Stones, released in early 1976.

In 1978 he released a very successful solo album Vanha ja Uusi Romanssi. He had dropped the name "Isokynä" and was now called simply Dave (pronounced Dá-vé in Finnish slang) Lindholm. In 1979 he formed a rock group called the Bluesounds that also performed in English. Its most famous album "Black" was released in 1980.

The first Dave Lindholm & Canpaza Gypsys album (1995). Canpaza Gypsys recorded all together three albums with a slightly varying line-up. The third album, Hot, was recorded in January 1997.

Lindholm has kept on recording and performing his music throughout the years. He has enjoyed relatively little publicity compared to many other long term rock musicians in Finland, but his works are highly respected by Finnish popular music critics and rock/pop music lovers.

The most famous songs by Lindholm include "Pieni ja hento ote" (a small slender grip), "Jatsikansa tulee" (the jazz folks are coming), "Sitähän se kaikki on" (that's what it all is), "Kaikki menee seinään" (everything runs into the wall), "Joo, joo, mä rakastan sua" (yes, yes I love you), and "Annan kitaran laulaa vaan" (just let the guitar sing).

== Discography ==
=== Solo albums ===
- Iso "Kynä" Lindholm (1972)
- Sirkus (1973)
- Isokynä & Orfeus: Musiikkia (1974)
- Isokynä & Orfeus: Lillan (1974)
- Fandjango (1975)
- Kenen laulu (1977, kokoelma)
- Vanha & uusi romanssi (1979)
- Aino (1982)
- Huoneet 6 & 14 (1983)
- Kuutamolla (1983)
- Moderni hiljainen musiikki (1985)
- Sissi (1987)
- Jose Blues (1988)
- Sillalla (1990)
- Sisar (1991)
- Kerran (1992)
- Kissatanssit (1992)
- LLL (1993)
- Valmista kamaa (1996, kokoelma)
- Just (1998)
- Punainen + (1998)
- Valkoinen & (1999)
- Luuttujengi tulee (2001)
- Lähes 50 (kokoelma, 2002)
- D & D (2006)
- Dave Lindholm in English (2006, live)
- Nuo mainiot miehet soivine koneineen (with Jarmo Saitajoki) (2007)
- Ken elää, ken näkee. Ken B (2013)
- Ajaton on Ajoissa (2015)

=== EPs ===
- Dave Lindholm & Antero Jakoila: Crazy Moon (1980)
- Dave Lindholm & Pepe Ahlqvist: Stunning Episodes (2000) ([Rytmi-lehden kustantama CD)

=== DVDs ===
- Dave Lindholm & Henrik Otto Donner: Pieni ja hento ote (2008)

== Bands ==
- Ferris (1969–1971)
- Isokynä & Orfeus (1973–1974)
- Rock'n'Roll Band (1975)
- Pen Lee (1977–1979) ja Pen Lee & Co. (1975–1976)
- Bluesounds (1979–1981)
- Sleepy Sleepers
- Pelle Miljoona (1983)
- The Run Runs (1983–1985)
- Dave's 12 Bar (1985–1987)
- Dave Lindholm & White Midnight (1989–1990)
- Leningrad Cowboys
- Dave Lindholm & Canpaza Gypsys (1994–1997)
- Dave Lindholm & Pitkät kiinalaiset (2000)
- SF-Blues (2002)
- Redclouds (2003)
- Dave Lindholm & Jakes Blues Band (2004)
- Messengers (2008-)
