= Sal Salvador =

American jazz guitarist and educator (1925–1999)

Sal Salvador (November 21, 1925 – September 22, 1999), whose name was originally Silvio Smiraglia, was an American bebop jazz guitarist and a prominent music educator.

He was born in Monson, Massachusetts, United States, and began his professional career in New York City. He eventually moved to Stamford, Connecticut. He taught guitar at the University of Bridgeport in Bridgeport, Connecticut as well as at Western Connecticut State University in Danbury, Connecticut. He wrote several instruction books for beginning to advanced guitarists.

In addition to recordings with Stan Kenton and with his own groups, Salvador can be heard in the film Blackboard Jungle, during a scene in a bar where a recording on which he is featured is played on the jukebox. He is also featured playing with Sonny Stitt in the film, Jazz on a Summer's Day, at the Newport Jazz Festival.

He died in September 1999, following a fight with cancer, at the age of 73.

== Discography ==
Year recorded	Title	Label	Notes
1953	Sal Salvador Quintet	Blue Note	With Frank Socolow (tenor saxophone), Johnny Williams (piano), Kenny O'Brien (bass), Jimmy Campbell (drums)
1954	Kenton Presents Jazz – Sal Salvador	Capitol	With Eddie Costa (p, vib), Jimmy Campbell (d)
1956	Frivolous Sal	Bethlehem	With Eddie Costa (p, vib), George Roumanias (b), Jimmy Campbell (d)
1956-57	Shades of Sal Salvador	Bethlehem	Septet
1957	A Tribute to the Greats	Bethlehem	With Eddie Costa (p, vib), Sonny Dallas (b), Ronnie Free (d)
1958	Colors in Sound	Decca	Quartet with Brass
1959	The Beat For This Generation	Decca	Big Band
1963	You Ain't Heard Nothin' Yet!	Dauntless	Big Band
1963	Music to Stop Smoking By	Roulette	Quartet
1978	Starfingers	Beehive	Sextet
1978	Juicy Lucy	Bee Hive	Quartet
1978	Parallelogram	GP	Quartet
1983	In Our Own Sweet Way	Stash Records	Quintet
1984	Plays The World's Greatest Jazz Standards	Stash Records	Quartet
1989	Crystal Image	Stash Records	With Mike Giordano (g), Barbara Sfraga (v), Phil Bowler (b), Greg Burrows (d, synth), Unknown (perc/vocal effects), Teo Macero (prod, arr, synth)

With Stan Kenton

- Popular Favorites by Stan Kenton (Capitol, 1953)
- Sketches on Standards (Capitol, 1953)
- This Modern World (Capitol, 1953)
- Portraits on Standards (Capitol, 1953)
- The Kenton Era (Capitol, 1940–54, [1955])
