= Asia Minor (album) =

Studio album by Dizzy Reece
- Released: 1962
- Recorded: March 13, 1962
- Studio: Van Gelder Studio, Englewood Cliffs, New Jersey
- Genre: Jazz
- Length: 36:25
- Label: New Jazz

Dizzy Reece chronology
Soundin' Off (1960)	Asia Minor (1962)	From In to Out (1970)

Asia Minor is an album by Jamaican-born jazz trumpeter Dizzy Reece featuring performances recorded in 1962 and originally released on the New Jazz label.

Professional ratings
Review scores
Source	Rating
Down Beat	3/5 stars
Allmusic	4.5/5 stars
The Penguin Guide to Jazz Recordings	3.5/4 stars

== Reception ==
Contemporaneous reviews of Asia Minor were positive, with the Jazz Journal describing it as "modern jazz at a high level". Critical reflections of the album since its release have often concluded that it was Reece's finest session of the period and a "masterpiece". A review by Scott Yanow for AllMusic awarded the album 4½ stars and stated: "The solos tend to be concise but quite meaningful, and, overall, this hard bop but occasionally surprising session is quite memorable".

== Track listing ==
All compositions by Dizzy Reece except where noted.

1. "The Shadow of Khan" – 5:31
2. "The Story of Love" (Carlos Eleta Almarán) – 4:32
3. "Yamask" – 5:40
4. "Spiritus Parkus [Parker's Spirit]" (Cecil Payne) – 4:40
5. "Summertime" (George Gershwin, Ira Gershwin, DuBose Heyward) – 7:51
6. "Ackmet" – 8:11

== Personnel ==
- Dizzy Reece – trumpet
- Joe Farrell – tenor saxophone, flute
- Cecil Payne – baritone saxophone
- Hank Jones – piano
- Ron Carter – bass
- Charlie Persip – drums
