= Heikki Sarmanto =

Finnish jazz pianist and composer (born 1939)

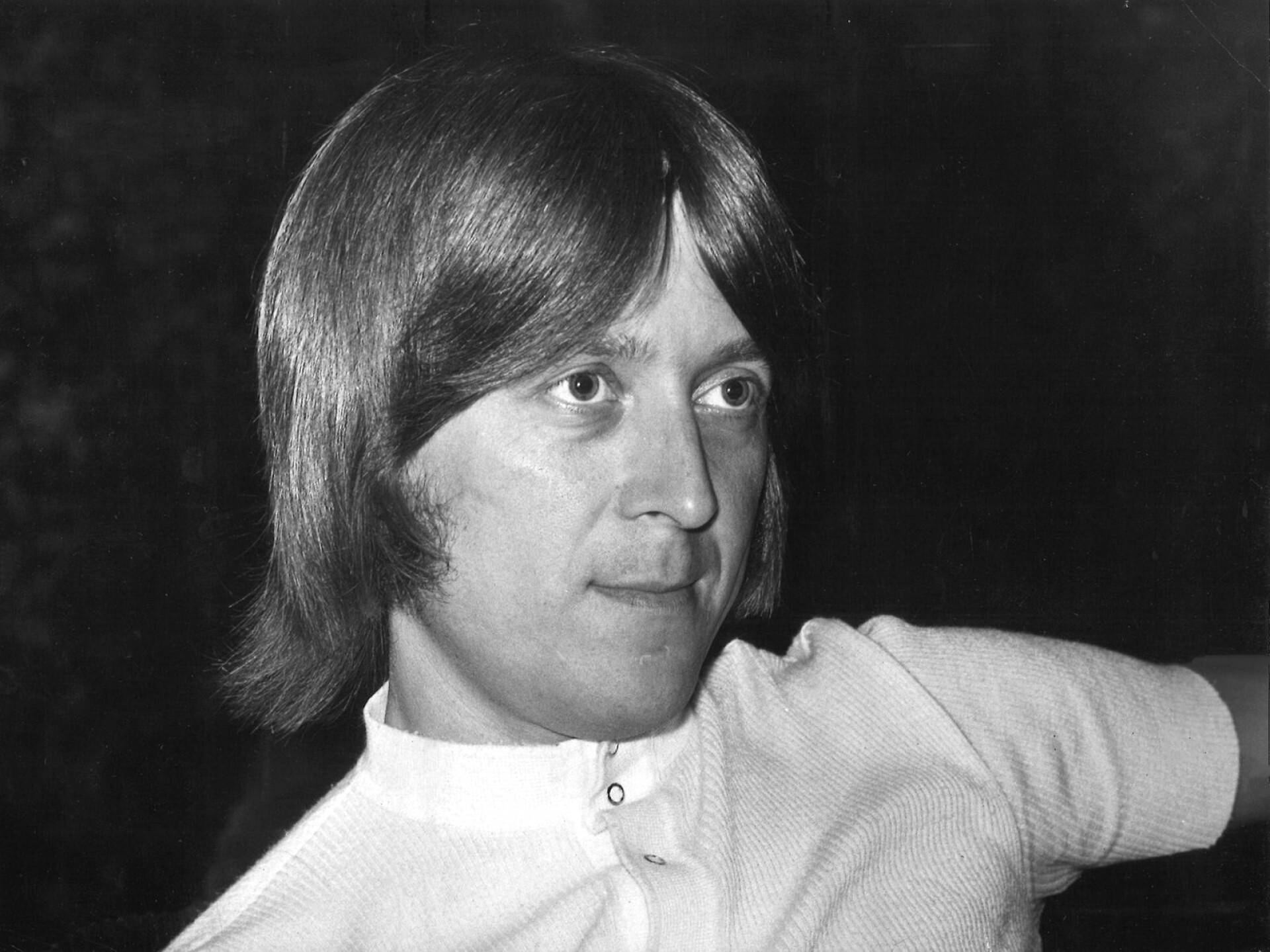

Background information
- Born: Heikki Veli Uolevi Sarmanto; 22 June 1939 (age 87); Helsinki, Finland
- Genres: Jazz, classical
- Occupations: Pianist, composer
- Instrument: Piano
- Years active: 1966–present
- Website: http://www.sarmanto.com/

Heikki Veli Uolevi Sarmanto (born 22 June 1939) is a Finnish jazz pianist and composer.

Sarmanto was born in Helsinki, Finland, and began to play jazz during the 1960s. He studied first at the Sibelius Academy and later at the Berklee College of Music in Boston between 1968 and 1971. In 1970 he was chosen as 'Jazz Musician of the Year' in Finland and, the following year, he won top prizes at the Montreux Jazz Festival in both piano and combo categories.

Sarmanto has released around 40 recordings, numerous published scores, and songbooks, as well as having several film scores to his credit. He has collaborated with jazz musicians such as Sonny Rollins, Art Farmer, Helen Merrill, George Russell and Jeannine Otis; in addition to his work in the classical arena with baritone Jorma Hynninen, the Finnish Radio Symphony Orchestra and the Tapiola Children's Choir.

Sarmanto composed music for Le Café de mes Souvenirs, a Finnish-French music film, which is directed by Valto Baltzar, and starred by Anouchka Delon, Irina Björklund, and Jorma Uotinen.

In September 1998, Sarmanto was appointed Artistic Director of the UMO Jazz Orchestra.

Pekka Sarmanto, who is also a jazz musician, is Sarmanto's brother.

== Discography ==
- Flowers in the Water (1969)
- Counterbalance (1971)
- Like a Fragonard (1971)
- Everything Is It (1972)
- Onnen aika (Time of Happiness) (1973)
- Open Ear (1975)
- No Comments (1975)
- Our Latin Friends (1976)
- Syksy ja muita lauluja (Autumn and Other Songs) (1976)
- Moment Musical (1978)
- New Hope Jazz Mass (1979)
- Magic Song (with Jeannine Otis) (1980)
- The Voice/Maija (1981)

- Song for my Brother (1982)
- Kuutamo Metsässä (Moonlight in the Forest) (1983)
- Suomi, A Symphonic Poem for Orchestra (1984)
- Betonimylläri (Concrete Mixer) (1987)
- Man with a Sax (1987)
- Taina: Scene from a Trance (1987)
- Felix the Great (1988)
- Northern Pictures (1989)
- Salakuljetettu ikoni ("Smuggled Icon") (1989)
- Pan Fantasy (1990)
- Distant Dreams (1990)
- The Traveler (1991)

- Tales of Max: An Odyssey in Jazz (1991)
- Kalevala Fantasy (1992)
- Evergreen Love Songs (1993)
- Hearts (1995)
- Nocturne (1996)
- Perfect Harmony (1996)
- Carrousel (1997
- Hellyys (1997)
- Meet the Composer (1997)
- Déjà Vu (2000)
- Rise (2001)
- Horizons - A lua luará (2003)
- The Touch Of Your Voice (2004)
- Carola & Heikki Sarmanto Trio (2004)
- The Song Of Extinct Birds (2005)
