= Ted Curson =

American jazz trumpeter (1935–2012)

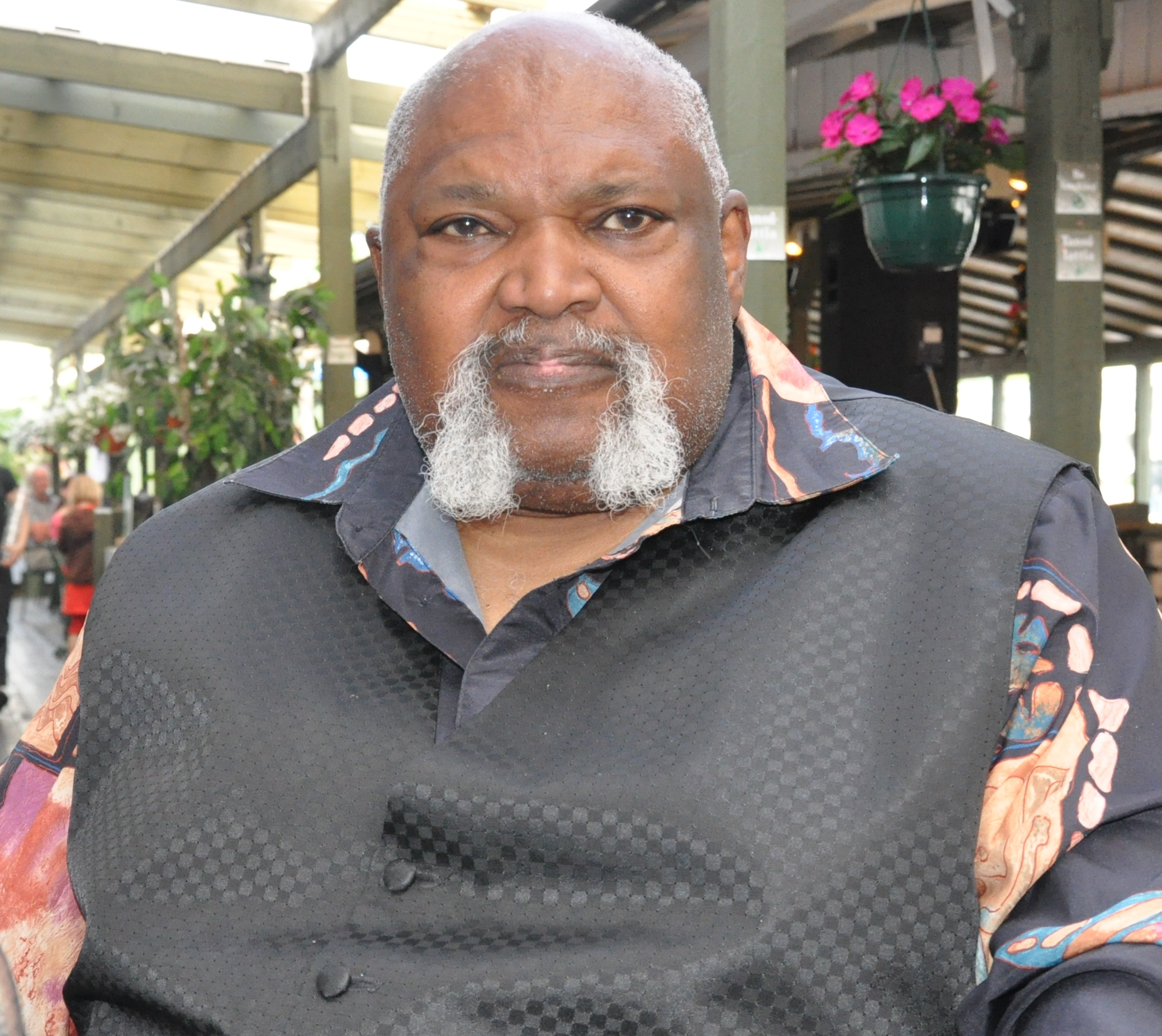
- Ted Curson in Turku, Finland, July 2009

Background information
- Born: June 3, 1935; Philadelphia, Pennsylvania, U.S.
- Died: November 4, 2012 (aged 77) Montclair, New Jersey
- Genres: Jazz, avant-garde jazz
- Occupation: Musician
- Instrument: Trumpet
- Years active: 1955–2012
- Labels: Prestige, Fontana, Atlantic, Freedom, Futura, Marge, Trident, Whynot, Inner City, Chiaroscuro
- Formerly of: Charles Mingus, Spirit of Life Ensemble

Theodore Curson (June 3, 1935 – November 4, 2012) was an American jazz trumpeter.

== Life and career ==
Curson was born in Philadelphia. He became interested in playing trumpet after watching a newspaper salesman play a silver trumpet. Curson's father, however, wanted him to play alto saxophone like Louis Jordan. When he was ten, he gained his first trumpet.

He attended Granoff School of Music in Philadelphia. At the suggestion of Miles Davis, he moved to New York in 1956. He performed and recorded with Cecil Taylor in the late 1950s and early 1960s. His composition "Tears for Dolphy" has been used in numerous films. He was featured in a profile on composer Graham Collier in the 1985 Channel 4 documentary, Hoarded Dreams.

He was a familiar face in Finland, having performed at the Pori Jazz festival every year since it began in 1966. In 2007, he performed at Finland's Independence Day Ball at the invitation of president Tarja Halonen.

A longtime resident of Montclair, New Jersey, Curson died from a heart attack in the township on November 4, 2012.

== Discography ==
=== As leader ===
- Plenty of Horn (Old Town, 1961)
- Ted Curson Plays Fire Down Below (Prestige, 1963)
- Live at La'Tete De L'Art (Trans-World, 1962)
- Tears for Dolphy (Fontana, 1965)
- The New Thing & the Blue Thing (Atlantic, 1965)
- Urge (Fontana, 1966)
- Ode to Booker Ervin (Columbia, 1970)
- Pop Wine (Futura, 1971)
- Cattin' Curson (Marge, 1975)
- Blue Piccolo (Whynot, 1976)
- Jubilant Power (Inner City, 1976)
- Quicksand (Atlantic, 1977)
- Flip Top (Arista/Freedom, 1977)
- Fireball (Trio, 1979)
- Blowin' Away with Dizzy Reece (Interplay, 1978)
- The Trio (Interplay, 1979)
- I Heard Mingus (Trio, 1980)
- Snake Johnson (Chiaroscuro, 1981)
- Traveling On (Evidence, 1997)

=== As sideman ===
With Bill Barron

- The Tenor Stylings of Bill Barron (Savoy, 1961)
- Modern Windows (Savoy, 1962)
- Now, Hear This! (Audio Fidelity, 1964)

With Eric Dolphy

- Candid, Dolphy (Candid, 1989)
- Outward Bound (Poll Winners, 2011)

With Charles Mingus

- Mingus (Candid, 1961)
- Charles Mingus Presents Charles Mingus (Candid, 1961)
- Mingus Revisited (Limelight, 1965)
- Mingus at Antibes (Atlantic, 1976)

With Archie Shepp

- Fire Music (Impulse!, 1965)
- Quartet (FreeFactory, 2009)

With Cecil Taylor

- Love for Sale (United Artists, 1959)
- Into the Hot (Impulse!, 1962)
- In Transition (Blue Note, 1975)
- The New Breed (ABC Impulse!, 1978) – reissue of tracks from Into the Hot

With others

- Pepper Adams, California Cookin' (Interplay, 1991)
- Ran Blake, Film Noir (Arista Novus, 1980)
- Nick Brignola, Baritone Madness (Bee Hive, 1978)
- Bill Dixon & Archie Shepp, Bill Dixon 7-tette/Archie Shepp and the New York Contemporary 5 (Savoy, 1964)
- Graham Collier, Hoarded Dreams (Cuneiform, 2007)
- Gil Evans, Into The Hot (Impulse!, 1962)
- Andrew Hill, Spiral (Arista/Freedom, 1975)
- Karin Krog, Joy (Meantime, 2008)
- Teo Macero, Impressions of Charles Mingus (Palo Alto, 1983)
- Misha Mengelberg & Piet Noordijk, Journey (MCN, 2011)
- Mark Murphy, Living Room (Muse, 1986)
- Sal Nistico, Neo/Nistico (Bee Hive, 1978)
- Andrzej Trzaskowski, Seant (Polskie Nagrania, 1966)
