= Flow Festival line-ups =

Music festival in Helsinki, Finland

Flow Festival is a music festival, taking place annually in Helsinki, Finland. The event is known for its varied selection of lineup and arts exhibition.

== Line-ups ==
All information taken from the Flow website. The 2004 festival lineup is presented in alphabetical order. From 2005 onward, the lineups are presented from the earliest to latest set times.

=== 2004 ===
- Club Wahoo! with Leftside Ensemble DJs
- Jazzanova
- Jori Hulkkonen vs Nuspirit Helsinki DJs (Lil' Tony & Ender): Made in Detroit
- Lifesaver presents: MC Ruudolf, Hypeman Karri Koira & DJ Allekirjoittanut
- Lifesaver Record Store DJs Didier, Anonymous, Pirrka & Pablo
- Marlena Shaw
- Nicola Conte
- Norman Jay
- Nuspirit Helsinki live featuring Teddy Rok and Guests
- Ricky-Tick Records presents: DJ Go-Go Antti with August Ekström, Dalindèo and Nicola Conte
- Seiji (Bugz in the Attic) with MC MG
- The Five Corners Quintet
- Ty

=== 2005 ===
Flow Live
Friday: Husky Rescue Big Band Special, King Britt presents Sister Gertrude Morgan, Omar
Saturday: Mark Murphy with The Five Corners Quintet, The Five Corners Quintet feat. Okou, Marva Whitney

Rocking Chair Club
Friday: DJ Didier, DJ Kenny "Dope" Gonzalez
Saturday: DJ Anonymous, DJ Osunlade, DJ Spinna

Redroom
Friday: Inner City of Berlin featuring Âme & Dixon
Saturday: Made in Detroit feat. Jori Hulkkonen, Lil Tony & Ender

Makasiinit Yard
Friday: Ville Valo & Kalle Hakkarainen: Odotustila
Saturday: JazzCotech Dancers

Flow Record Fair
Saturday: Lifesaver vs Wahoo vs Straight No Chaser Magazine DJ's

=== 2006 ===
Flow Yard
Friday: Siiri Nordin & The Sweeters, TV-resistori, Aavikko, Natha / Vri-il, Happy Mondays, Gravenhurst
Saturday: Lifesaver DJs Didier & Anonymous, Raw Fusion Sound System, Hearin' Aid, U Brown & Sound Explosion Riddim Section, Ali Shaheed Muhammad, Stones Throw Records presents feat. Oh No, Wildchild & Vinia Mojica, Romes, Dudley Perkins & Georgia Anne Muldrow, Candi Staton
Sunday: Wahoo, Quintessence, Dalindèo feat. Michiko, The Five Corners Quintet & One, José González

Valkoinen sali
Friday: Toinen Linja, Katusea Soundsystem, Lindstrøm & Prins Thomas, Coldcut, Underground Resistance presents Galaxy 2 Galaxy & Los Hermanos
Saturday: Helsinki Ghetto Bass Patrol, Tortured Soul, Henrik Schwarz, Aril Brikha, Jazzanova, Moodymann

Kuudes linja
Friday: Club Gäng!, Happy Mondays
Saturday: Lifesaver DJs Didier & Anonymous, Edan with Dagha

Flow-afterparty, Rose Garden
Saturday: Acid Kings, Made in Chicago featuring DJs Jori Hulkkonen, Ender & Lil' Tony

=== 2007 ===
Outdoor Stage
Friday: Nicole Willis & The Soul Investigators, Pepe Deluxé, Terry Callier, CocoRosie
Saturday: Rättö ja Lehtisalo, The Valkyrians, Architecture in Helsinki, Op:l Bastards, !!!, ESG
Sunday: Risto, Tuomo Prättälä, Jenny Wilson, Bebel Gilberto

Tent
Friday: Pooma, K-X-P, Samae Koskinen, The Five Corners Quintet, Jukka Eskola, The Stance Brothers, Timo Lassy, DJ Antti Eerikäinen
Saturday: Andreas Söderström Solo, Shogun Kunitoki, Quiet Village, Hannulelauri, Luomo, Jori Hulkkonen
Sunday: Eleanoora Rosenholm, Jaakko Eino Kalevi, Korpi Ensemble, Katusea Soundsystem

Club
Friday: Matthew Jonson, Tiefschwarz, Carl Craig
Saturday: Cut Chemist, Gilles Peterson, Cosmo Baker

=== 2008 ===
Main Stage
Friday: Asa, Jamie Lidell, Kings of Convenience, Múm
Saturday: Astrid Swan, Kuusum un Profeetta, Raappana & The Sound Explosion, Sébastien Tellier, CSS, The Roots
Sunday: Reino & the Rhinos, The Five Corners Quintet, Señor Coconut and His Orchestra feat. Argenis Brito, Martha Reeves & The Vandellas, Cut Copy

Tent Stage
Friday: DJ Anonymous & Fiskars B2B Dance Classics Extravaganza, Jesse, Le Corps Mince de Françoise, 22-Pistepirkko, Christian Prommer's Drumlesson, Crystal Castles
Saturday: Âme & Lil Tony Cosmic Roots, TV OFF, Joose Keskitalo & Kolmas Maailmanpalo, Detektivbyrån, Borko, Eagle Boston, Hidria Spacefolk, Huoratron
Sunday: Astro Can Caravan, Plutonium 74, Ane Brun, José James, Moritz von Oswald Trio feat. Vladislav Delay

Club Voimala
Friday: Kiki, Âme, Sebo K, M.A.N.D.Y.
Saturday: Top Billin DJs & Anonymous, DJ Eli Escobar, Massive B, DJ Funk

Club Tiivistämö
Friday: Harmönia presents Masters Of Skweee! Boyz of Caligula, Mesak, Randy Barracuda, V.C., Claws Cousteau, Michael Black Electro, PJVM; Grime/Dub Step: Caspa & Rusko + Tes La Rok & Dead-O, Jungle & J-Tek: DJ Randall + Del & Boj Lucki
Saturday: Artificial Latvamäki, Samuli Kemppi, Mr Velcro Fastener, Imatran Voima, Jori Hulkkonen, Robert Hood

=== 2009 ===
Concert
Thursday: Aavikko, Avid Symphony Orchestra, Kraftwerk

Main Stage
Friday: Oi pojat, Frida Hyvönen, Yann Tiersen, New Young Pony Club, Vampire Weekend
Saturday: Regina, Röyhkä & Rättö & Lehtisalo, Hypnotic Brass Ensemble, Seun Kuti & Egypt 80, White Lies, Grace Jones
Sunday: Jupiter Soul Revue, Ricky-Tick Records Sound Bash, Jenny Wilson, Nitin Sawhney, Lily Allen, Fever Ray

Tent Stage
Friday: The Terror Pigeon Dance Revolt, HeartsRevolution, Pintandwefall, Le Corps Mince de Françoise, Joensuu 1685, Roots Manuva, Ladyhawke
Saturday: Villa Nah, Rubik, Eero Johannes, Vivian Girls, Jazzanova, Flying Lotus, Handsome Furs, The Juan MacLean
Sunday: Vuk, Cats on Fire, The Capital Beat, Collie Buddz & The New Kingston Band, The Big Pink, Final Fantasy

Voimala
Friday: Top Billin DJs & New Judas DJs, DJ Mehdi, Huoratron
Saturday: Lil Tony, Kerri Chandler, A Critical Mass, Radio Slave

Tiivistämö
Friday: Organ, Mika Vainio, Andreas Tilliander, MI NI MA, Scuba
Saturday: Tes La Rok, Loefah and MC Sgt Pokes, Kode9, David Rodigan

Makasiini
Friday: Ponytail, Sönderbyggd, Nuslux, DJ Sniff
Saturday: Tuuli Inari, Kuupuu, Nim, Gudrun Gut

=== 2010 ===
Concert
Wednesday: Kap Kap, LCD Soundsystem, The Chemical Brothers

Main Stage
Friday: Jimi Tenor & Tony Allen, Broken Bells, Air, Big Boi
Saturday: Maria Gasolina, Uusi Fantasia, Husky Rescue, Timo Lassy Orchestra with José James, Robyn, M.I.A.
Sunday: Yona & Orkesteri Liikkuvat Pilvet, Ricky-Tick Big Band, Konono Nº1, Caribou, The xx

Tent Stage
Friday: Kiki Pau, Villa Nah, Circle, The Drums
Saturday: Myron & E with The Soul Investigators, K-X-P, Surfer Blood, Junip, Omar Souleyman, Beach House
Sunday: Dinosauruxia, Kemmuru, The Radio Dept., Girls, RotFront, Marina and the Diamonds

Voimala Concert
Friday: Ulver
Saturday: Owen Pallett
Sunday: Ballaké Sissoko

Voimala Club
Friday: Four Tet, Ricardo Villalobos
Saturday: Dead-O, Tes La Rok, Joker & Nomad, Diplo

Tent Club
Friday: Misf*ts, Aeroplane, Magnetic Man
Saturday: Major Lazer, Rye Rye, Sleigh Bells

Flow Back Yard
Friday: Didier's Sound Spectrum, Awesome Tapes From Africa, Bongo Rock
Saturday: DJ Fummer, DJ Graalin Maljaakko & DJ Fiskars, Jaakko & Jay, DJ Lil Tony, DJ Harvey, Hannulelauri
Sunday: Sintti Silmusuu, Vallilan Tango, We Love Helsinki, Darya & Månskensorkestern, We Love Helsinki

Tiivistämö
Friday: Sami Kukka, Tsembla, Puiset Heilat, Islaja, Keränen, Rapa & Roksette Rock N Roll Spectacle
Saturday: Grey Park, Ona Kamu, Lau Nau, Taco Bells, Arch of Neo, Vladislav Delay, Jori Hulkkonen, Clouds
Sunday: Ville Leinonen & Majakan Soittokunta, Hei, Pekko Käppi, Marjatta, Tomutonttu, Kiila

=== 2011 ===
Main Stage
Friday: Asa Masa, Midlake, MF Doom, Röyksopp
Saturday: Yona & Orkesteri Liikkuvat Pilvet, Magenta Skycode, Jo Stance, Iron & Wine, Lykke Li, Empire of the Sun
Sunday: Reino & the Rhinos, Jukka Eskola Quintet with Strings, Sly and Robbie featuring Junior Reid, Twin Shadow, Kanye West

Nokia Lounge
Friday: Top Billin, Yé Yé
Saturday: Spoek Mathambo, Top Billin, Girl Unit, Sharkslayer
Sunday: Ionik, Motor City Drum Ensemble, Robert Rodriguez, Top Billin

Nokia Blue Tent
Friday: French Films, Destroyer, The Budos Band, Warpaint, El Guincho, Ariel Pink's Haunted Graffiti
Saturday: Delay Trees, Regina, The Pains of Being Pure at Heart, Mayer Hawthorne, Shantel & Bucovina Club Orkestar, Janelle Monáe, The Human League
Sunday: Astro Can Caravan, Minä ja Ville Ahonen, Rubik, Mogwai, Battles, James Blake

Black Tent
Friday: Herman Prime, About Group, Matthew Dear, House Party, Hercules and Love Affair, Jori Hulkkonen, Cosmo Baker, Matias Aguayo
Saturday: Toni Halo, Renaissance Man, Hannulelauri, Shine 2009, The Dø, Roberto Rodriguez, Tensnake, DJ Anonymous, KiNK, DJ Koze
Sunday: Katerina, The Do-Over Hosted by Aloe Blacc, Jamie Woon, Horse Meat Disco

Voimala Club
Friday: Non Person featuring Sarah Kivi, Teeth, Blawan, Pearson Sound, Joy Orbison, Tes La Rok
Saturday: Desto featuring Jimi Tenor, 2562, Martyn, Oni Ayhun, Pantha du Prince
Sunday: Marcel Dettmann, Ben Klock, Shed

Voimala Live
Friday: Hauschka featuring Samuli Kosminen
Saturday: Mirel Wagner, First Aid Kit
Sunday: Tony Trischka

Open Source Stage
Friday: DJ Tuipe, Mimosa, Nightsatan, Eevil Stöö, Holy Moly DJs Mike Dunn Special
Saturday: DJ Tuipe, Wannabe Ballerinas, Stockers!, MC Taakibörstä PA 2011 Reunion, Poutatorvi, Mokka & Kinnunen
Sunday: Ateneumin Ämpärirumpali, Michael Cassette, Eero Johaness Jakaa Sisältöä, Joda + Rudy + Särre Freestyle, DJ Tuipe

Cirko
Friday: Avarus, Dxxxa & Nukkehallitus, Ignatz, Mikko Innanen & Innkvisitio
Saturday: Murcof + AntiVJ, Dolphins Into the Future, Fricara Pacchu, Barry Andrewsin Disko, Kawaguchi Masami's New Rock Syndicate
Sunday: Bridget Hayden, Keuhkot, Kemialliset Ystävät, Pretty Lightning

Wine & Sapas
Friday: Sväng
Saturday: Timo Lassy Trio
Sunday: Lepistö & Lehti

Back Yard
Friday: Komposti Sound System, Analog Africa Soundsystem, Danny Krivit
Saturday: Tixa, T.A. Kaukolampi, Vilunki, Odj Harri, Joakim Haugland, A Love from Outer Space (Andrew Weatherall & Sean Johnston)
Sunday: We Love Helsinki

Champagne Bar
Friday: J-Laini, Käki
Saturday: Aromi, Poika & Hirviö
Sunday: Esko Routamaa, Käki

=== 2012 ===
Main Stage
Friday: Jukka Poika, Yann Tiersen, Miike Snow, Lykke Li
Saturday: Dumari & Spuget, Nicole Willis & The Soul Investigators, Horace Andy and Dub Asante, Saint Etienne, The Black Keys
Sunday: Manna, French Films, Feist, Björk

The Other Sound @ Cirko
Friday: Toblerones, Seremonia, Motelli Skronkle, Orchestra of Spheres, Oneohtrix Point Never
Saturday: Tuusanuuskat, Pekka Airaksinen, Michael Flower, Fennesz & Lillevan, The Splits, Sleep ∞ Over
Sunday: Unela, Jarse, Goodiepal, Bear Bones Lay Low, Quiltland, Heatsick

Nokia Blue Tent
Wednesday: Joose Keskitalo & Kolmas Maailmanpalo, Bon Iver
Friday: Stockers!, Siinai + Moonface, A$AP Rocky, Eevil Stöö, DJ Kridlokk & Koksukoo, Charles Bradley and His Extraordinaires
Saturday: Miau, Black Twig, Ane Brun, Swans, Nicolas Jaar, Richie Hawtin
Sunday: Atlético Kumpula, Burning Hearts, Pepe Deluxé, Dâm-Funk, The War on Drugs, St. Vincent

Nokia Lounge
Friday: Harju Youth Center Presents: Focus & AT, Nada, Clap Dance DJs, Bicep, Cosmo Baker
Saturday: Harju Youth Center Presents: Selekta Ssoze & DJ Kuk Norris, Just Paha, Tytti, Katerina, Lauri Soini
Sunday: Karri Koira, Didier, Daniel Savio, Harvest

Black Tent
Friday: Kemmuru, Korallreven, Gracias, AraabMuzik, Four Tet & Caribou
Saturday: Trevor Deep Jr, Beverly Girls, Roberto Rodriguez, Lindstrøm, Kindness, Huoratron, Chromatics
Sunday: Bendagram, Sin Cos Tan, Friends, Kuusumun Profeetta, Shangaan Electro

Open Source Stage
Friday: Straktobeam, Asta Emilia & Omor, Antero Lindgren, Kultabassokerho Freestyle Open
Saturday: Hermanni Turkki, Kari Tapiiri + Akira + Dallas = Dakiiri, Crystal Clears, Karri Koira, Veturimiehet Heiluttaa Plays Autiomaa
Sunday: Koponen & Sirén, Pretty Bruises Squad, Memmy Posse, Phantom

Voimala Concert
Friday: Sun Araw
Saturday: Mikko Joensuu
Sunday: Jason Moran, A Winged Victory for the Sullen

Wastelands
Friday: Rime, Kolektif Istanbul, Tamikrest
Saturday: Verneri Pohjola, Awesome Tapes From Africa, Baba Zula, Jason Moran & The Bandwagon
Sunday: Murat Meric, Tiiu Helinä, Jason Moran & the Bandwagon, Orchestre Poly-Rythmo de Cotonou

Voimala Club
Friday: Monolake, Africa Hitech, Actress
Saturday: Arch of Neo, Desto, Pinch

Tiivistämö
Friday: Elifantree
Saturday: Mopo
Sunday: Herd

Backyard
Friday: Super Mazembe, Bongo Rock feat. Cornell Campbell, Theo Parrish, Nina Kraviz
Saturday: Yön Syke feat. Jaakko Eino Kalevi, Erkko, Anonymous, Mika Snickars
Sunday: We Love Helsinki

Champagne Bar & Lounge
Friday: Poika & Hirviö, Fag You DJs
Saturday: Tuipe & Alari Orav, Irene Kostas & Kristiina Männikkö, Odj Harri & Käki
Sunday: Sheikki Sheikki, ODJ TG & Super-Samuli, Sonny T

=== 2013 ===
Opening Concert
Wednesday: Kate Boy, Tarek Warm Up, The Knife

Main Stage
Friday: Dalindèo, Rubik, Kendrick Lamar, Alicia Keys
Saturday: Samae Koskisen Korvalääke, Jens Lekman, Cody Chesnutt, Nick Cave and the Bad Seeds
Sunday: Ricky-Tick Big Band & Julkinen Sana, Public Enemy, Of Monsters and Men, Kraftwerk 3D Show

Nokia Blue Tent
Friday: Häxjesus, Satellite Stories, Minä ja Ville Ahonen, Cat Power, Moderat
Saturday: Sarah Kivi & Non-Orchestra, Karri Koira, Austra, Nicole Willis & the Soul Investigators, My Bloody Valentine, Beach House
Sunday: Antero Lindgren, Husky Rescue, Godspeed You! Black Emperor, Bat for Lashes, Grimes

Black Tent
Friday: Yöt, Autre Ne Veut, K-X-P, Mykki Blanco, Huoratron
Saturday: Jaakko Eino Kalevi, Black Lizard, Pää Kii, Loost Koos, Parquet Courts, Factory Floor, Mount Kimbie
Sunday: Laineen Kasperi & Palava Kaupunki, Angel Haze, Haim, Disclosure, Goat

Balloon 360° Stage
Friday: Kahden Miehen Galaksi, The Lieblings, Timo Lassy Band, Jupiter & Okwess International
Saturday: Jaakko Laitinen & Väärä Raha, Aino Venna, Woods, Serenity Ensemble, Ebo Taylor & The Odapajan
Sunday: Black Motor & Verneri Pohjola, Jacco Gardner, Ravi Coltrane Quintet, Junip

The Other Sound
Friday: Käppi/Nyrhinen, Atom™, Chicaloyoh, Ghédalia Tazartès, U.S. Girls, Blixa Bargeld
Saturday: Panssarijuna, Urpf Lanze, Jyrki Nissinen & Hot Visions, Lau Nau, Love Cult, Circuit Des Yeux, Astral Social Club
Sunday: Kumma Heppu & Lopunajan Voidellut, Olimpia Splendid, Orphan Fairytale, Veli-Matti o Äijälä and the Kolmas, Julia Holter, Invader Ace

RBMA Backyard
Friday: Desto, Levon Zoltar, Jackmaster, Karenn, Maya Jane Coles
Saturday: Newhouse, Cola & Jimmu, Tim Sweeney, Space Dimension Controller, Lil Tony, Tensnake, Âme
Sunday: Reggae Sundays: Bitty McLean, Gappy Ranks and Christopher Ellis + more

Heineken O.S.S
Friday: Noah Kin, Anni, Vähäiset Äänet, Tuuttimörkö
Saturday: WGF, Jonna, Lieminen, DJPP All Stars
Sunday: Loft Apartment, Ballereinot, Oukkidouppi, Fotoshop

Champagne Bar & Lounge
Friday: Paska Sohva, Hang the DJ, Sounds Like Kotibileet, Tavastian Lauantaidisko
Saturday: Club Bangles, Kingfishers, Disco Obscura, Hannulelauri, Wild Combo
Sunday: We Love Helsinki

Nokia Garage
Saturday: Femme En Fourrure, Teeth, Space Dimension Controller, Tim Sweeney
Sunday: Timo Lassy, Ionik, Cola & Jimmu, Ender & Lil Tony

Tiivistämö
Friday: We Jazz, Kok Trio
Saturday: We Jazz, Trio Urho
Sunday: We Jazz, Smith & Zenger

=== 2014 ===
Main Stage
Friday: Risto, Nina Persson, Jessie Ware, Yasiin Bey aka Mos Def
Saturday: Astrid Swan, Les Ambassadeurs (Salif Keita, Amadou Bagayoko & Cheick Tidiane Seck), Scandinavian Music Group, Manic Street Preachers, The National
Sunday: Iisa, Nyt Kolisee, Janelle Monáe, Outkast

Lumia Blue Tent
Friday: Magenta Skycode, Skrillex, Bonobo, Darkside
Saturday: Siinai, Bill Callahan, Plain Ride, Little Dragon, Kavinsky
Sunday: Tuomo, Blood Orange, Röyksopp & Robyn, Die Antwoord

Black Tent
Friday: DJ Kridlokk, Pusha T, Slint, Jon Hopkins, Paul Kalkbrenner
Saturday: Noah Kin, How to Dress Well, MØ, Joey Badass, James Holden, Jamie xx
Sunday: Eurocrack, Sin Cos Tan, Jungle, Action Bronson, Mac DeMarco, Slowdive

Balloon 360° Stage
Friday: Nuslux, Jenny Wilson, Mirel Wagner, Tinariwen
Saturday: Eetu Floor & Ystävät, Mopo, Sarah Kivi & Non-Orchestra, Neneh Cherry with RocketNumberNine, Marissa Nadler, Poliça
Sunday: Antti Lötjönen Quartet East, Pietarin Spektaakkeli, Real Estate, Mark Ernestus Presents Jeri-jeri

The Other Sound
Friday: Grateful Däd, Joose Keskitalo, Roy Hargrove Quintet, Monopoly Child Star Searchers, Hopeajärvi, High Wolf
Saturday: Nicolas Kivilinna, Antti Tolvi, J. Tolvi, Evan Parker, Kemialliset Ystävät, Miaux
Sunday: Tomoko Sauvage, Sound & Fury, Hauschka Kosminen Zeigler, Lentoliskot, Maan

Champagne Bar
Friday: DJ Lene, Paska Sohva, Käki & Harri Hännikäinen, Erkko & Harvest
Saturday: Esko Routamaa, New Hi-Fi Soundsystem, Calvin Girls, Must Have!, Guggenheim
Sunday: We Love Helsinki

Red Bull Music Academy Backyard
Friday: Katerina, Peanut Butter Wolf, Ron Morelli, I-F (Intergalactic FM, Viewlexx, Murdercapital), Ceephax Acid Crew, Evian Christ
Saturday: Trevor Deep Jr, Fred P, Didier, Illum Sphere, Young Marco
Sunday: Baris K, Optimo, Tama Sumo, Mark Ernestus, Machinedrum

Mixradio Music Hall (Tiivistämö)
Friday: Torttila Miljoona & 2013, Riitaoja, Aksim, Femme En Fourrure, Phantom, Sasse & Jori Hulkkonen
Saturday: Shivan Dragn, Mr. Peter Hayden, Katujen äänet, Paperi T & Khid, Teksti-TV 666, Aivovuoto, Samuli Kemppi
Sunday: Rauhatäti, Gim Kordon, Death Hawks, St. Lucia, Beastmilk, Big Ups, Jaakko Eino Kalevi

=== 2015 ===
Main Stage
Friday: Yona, Lianne La Havas, CHIC featuring Nile Rodgers, Major Lazer
Saturday: Regina, Belle and Sebastian, Róisín Murphy, Pet Shop Boys
Sunday: Emma Salokoski, Beck, Florence and the Machine

Lapin Kulta Blue Tent
Friday: Manna, DOPE HKI, The War on Drugs, Ride
Saturday: French Films, Foxygen, Paperi T, Years & Years, Future Islands
Sunday: Mirel Wagner, Tyler, the Creator, Flying Lotus, Alt-J

Black Tent
Friday: Elliphant, Diplo, Clark, Run the Jewels
Saturday: LCMDF, Shamir, Skepta & Wiley, ILoveMakonnen, Evian Christ, Tiga
Sunday: Black Lizard, K-X-P, Todd Terje & The Olsens, Tove Lo, Future Brown

Bright Balloon 360° Stage
Friday: Verneri Pohjola Quartet, Lännen-Jukka, Songhoy Blues
Saturday: Dave Lindholm, Jukka Nousiainen, Forever Pavot, Reino Nordin, Seinabo Sey, Islam Chipsy
Sunday: John McGregor featuring Samuli Kosminen & Jarmo Saari, Kakkmaddafakka, Timo Lassy Band, Natalie Prass

The Other Sound (Voimala)
Friday: Olavi Louhivuori, The Space Lady, Grouper, Arthur Russell's Instrumentals Live Show, Vladislav Delay
Saturday: defunensemble, Hockey Night, O Samuli A, Marsen Jules, Mika Vainio, Filastine & Nova
Sunday: NYKY Ensemble, Janne Westerlund, Dog Life, Modern Feelings, The Mystic Revelation of Teppo Repo

Resident Advisor Backyard
Friday: J. Lindroos & Denzel, DJ Ender, Mano Le Tough, Dixon, Seth Troxler
Saturday: Kristiina Männikkö, Lauri Soini, Juho Kusti, Solar, Mr. G, Joey Anderson
Sunday: Emma Valtonen, Trevor Deep Jr, Lil Tony, Nina Kraviz

Tiivistämö
Friday: Hisko Detria, Have You Ever Seen the Jane Fonda Aerobic VHS?, Lasten Hautausmaa, Lorentz, Sairas T & OD Kokemus & O'Malley
Saturday: E-Musikgruppe Lux Ohr, Lokit, Likanen Etelä, Seksihullut, Kesä, Death Team, Shadowplay
Sunday: Kairon; IRSE!, Cats of Transnistria, Maaseudun Tulevaisuus, Musta Paraati, Cityman, Ronskibiitti

Champagne Bar & Lounge
Friday: Sansibar, Esko Routamaa, Janne X, Emma Kemppainen & Rony Rex
Saturday: D.R.E.A.M., Juha Mäki, You Are the Light, Scifibimboes, La Persé
Sunday: Samu-Jussi Koski, Synteettinen Suomi, Olli Koponen, Teemu Keisteri, Skenikswee & Harvest

=== 2016 ===
Main Stage
Friday: Raappana & New Riddim Crew, Laura Mvula, Iggy Pop, Massive Attack & Young Fathers
Saturday: Ricky-Tick Big Band & Julkinen Sana featuring Agit-Cirk, Liima, The Last Shadow Puppets, FKA twigs
Sunday: J. Karjalainen, Anderson .Paak & The Free Nationals, Sia

Lapin Kulta Red Arena
Friday: Jaakko Eino Kalevi, Lil B, Mikko Joensuu, Jamie xx
Saturday: Moonface & Siinai, Rooxx, Chvrches, M83, Morrissey
Sunday: Death Hawks, Ruger Hauer featuring Regina, Daughter, New Order, Anohni

Black Tent
Friday: Eevil Stöö, Kingfish, Stormzy, Four Tet, Sleaford Mods, Savages
Saturday: Itä-Hollola Installaatio, Ronya, View, Gettomasa, Hercules & Love Affair, Floating Points
Sunday: Khid, Alma, Dua Lipa, Descendents, Thee Oh Sees, Kaytranada

Zalando Factory
Friday: Töölön Ketterä, Elias Gould, Feels, Mura Masa
Saturday: Lake Jons, Litku Klemetti & Tuntematon numero, Noëp, Moa Pillar
Sunday: Räjäyttäjät, RPK, Venior, Karina

Bright Balloon 360° Stage
Friday: Irina Björklund, Teddy's West Coasters, A-WA, Paperi T x Pekka Kuusisto x Samuli Kosminen, Ata Kak
Saturday: Kalevi Louhivuori Quintet, Laraaji, Röyhkä/Inginmaa/Hypnomen, Mopo & Ville Leinonen, Dungen, Pat Thomas & Kwashibu Area Band
Sunday: Jukka Eskola Soul Trio+, Kosminen Rönkkö!, Thundercat, Kamasi Washington, Nicole Willis & Jimi Tenor & Tony Allen

The Other Sound
Friday: Ghost Box Project: Linda#faceinthemirror, Megalodon Collective, Pink Twins, Tsembla, William Basinski, Anna von Hausswolff
Saturday: NYKY Ensemble, Elatu Nessa, Destroyer2048, Draama-Helmi, The SultanS, Holly Herndon
Sunday: Osuma Ensemble, Myttys, Tapio & Tuomi Duo, Ian William Craig, Running, Lauri Ainala featuring Olli Ainala

Voimala
Friday: Mirage Man, DJ Pierre, Paula Temple, Ben Klock
Saturday: Samuli Kemppi, Voices from the Lake, Oscar Mulero, Jeff Mills
Sunday: Twwth, Ripatti, Arca & Jesse Kanda, Shackleton, Pantha du Prince

Champagne Bar & Lounge
Friday: Flashback Future, Linda Lazarov, Sexdate, Aaro DiCosta, Plattenbauten, Tero Männikkö, Jayda G
Saturday: Club Anvil, Katri Koivula, Jopo Símeon K, Better Things To Do, Kasko, Lauri Soini, Jussi Kantonen & Anssi Nieminen, Lipelis
Sunday: DJ Missstiff, Dj Windows95man, Apache Lifeforms, VG+ & Herkules, Jehu, Marc Fred, Jamie Tiller

Resident Advisor Backyard
Friday: Jokki & Jimi, JL, Fummer, Roman Flügel, The Black Madonna, Helena Hauff
Saturday: Noah Kin, Kristiina Männikkö, Trevor Deep Jr, Red Axes, Lil Tony, Kim Ann Foxman
Sunday: Sansibar, Villa Nah, Katerina, John Talabot

=== 2017 ===
Main Stage
Friday: Satellite Stories, Beth Ditto, Lana Del Rey
Saturday: Pykäri featuring Ahjo Ensemble, Danny Brown, Goldfrapp, The xx
Sunday: Elias Gould, Monsp Records 20th anniversary show, Ryan Adams, Frank Ocean

Lapin Kulta Red Arena
Friday: Gasellit, Young Thug, Aphex Twin, London Grammar
Saturday: MC Taakibörsta, Sparks, Sampha, Alma, Flume
Sunday: Astrid Swan, Ceebrolistics, The Afghan Whigs, Vince Staples, Moderat

Zalando Black Tent
Friday: Kauriinmetsästäjät, Litku Klemetti, Oranssi Pazuzu, Femme En Fourrure, Car Seat Headrest, Black Lips
Saturday: Töölön Ketterä, The Holy, Silvana Imam, Front 242, Bicep, Death Grips
Sunday: Vesta, Kube, Princess Nokia, Jenny Hval, Angel Olsen, Mr. Fingers

Bright Balloon 360°
Friday: Milo & Moses, Skott, Joshua Redman, Roy Ayers, Ibibio Sound Machine
Saturday: VIRTA, Julie Byrne, Max Jury, Timo Lassy Band featuring Eero Koivistoinen & Joyce, Mikko Joensuu, Janka Nabay & The Bubu Gang
Sunday: Ona Kamu, Verneri Pohjola, Jonna Tervomaa, Linnea Olsson, BadBadNotGood, Fatoumata Diawara & Hindi Zahra

Resident Advisor Front Yard
Friday: Vladimir Ivković B2B Lauri Soini, Clara 3000, Willow, Maceo Plex
Saturday: Linda Lazarov, Powder, Soichi Terada, Jon Hopkins, Inga Mauer, Lil Tony
Sunday: DJ Ender, Sadar Bahar, Marie Davidson, Fatima Yamaha, Lena Willikens

Voimala
Friday: Samuli Kemppi, Model 500, Lorenzo Senni, Planetary Assault Systems, Phase Fatale
Saturday: Kaitlyn Aurelia Smith, Emma Valtonen B2B Kristiina Männikkö, Nina Kraviz, Antti Salonen, Shed
Sunday: Mirage Man, SØS Gunver Ryberg, Timo Kaukolampi, Aleksi Perälä, The Hacker

The Other Sound
Friday: NYKY Ensemble, Laura Cannell, Plié, Black Motor, Veli-Matti o Äijälä and the Kolmas
Saturday: Midori Takada, Neutral, Tatsuru Arai, Selvhenter, LSDXOXO
Sunday: Dmitry Sinkovsky & Aapo Häkkinen, Mesak, Pekko Käppi & K:H:H:L, FAKA, Moor Mother

Red Garden
Friday: Jokki, Tero Männikkö & Apache Lifeforms, PEU, Joshi, Susanna Nuutinen, Denzel & Sansibar, Linda Lazarov & Kristiina Männikkö, Wes Baggaley
Saturday: Laura Mrls, Paula Koski, Ya Tosiba, Anna Myllyluoma, Loiriplukari, Marc Fred, Jenny Om, Olli Koponen, Mori Ra
Sunday: THRDEYEVSN, Ällistysnainen, Noah Kin, Tuuttimörkö, Onni Boi, Strictly Ysäri R&B, D.R.E.A.M., mobilegirl

Backyard
Friday: Irene Kostas, Timo Kaukolampi, Vladimir Ivkovic, J.Lindroos
Saturday: Esko Routamaa, Katerina, SØS Gunver Ryberg, Izabel
Sunday: Matti Nives, DJ Jonna, H_TDJ

Vinyl Market by We Jazz
Friday: Eero Löyttyjärv, Tommi P, Markus-setä, Arwi Lind, Martin Joela, Fredrik Lavik
Saturday: Jussi B, Matti Nives, Antti Eerikäinen, Liam Large, Fredrik Lavik, Arwi Lind, Markus-setä
Sunday: Tupla-Jukka, Tommi P, Antti Eerikäinen, Jussi B, Martin Joela, Eero Löyttyjärvi & Matti Nives, Liam Large

=== 2018 ===
Main Stage
Friday: Paperi T, Fleet Foxes, Patti Smith, Ms. Lauryn Hill
Saturday: Lake Jons, Vesta, Grizzly Bear, Arctic Monkeys
Sunday: Pyhimys, Lykke Li, Kendrick Lamar

Lapin Kulta Red Arena
Friday: Töölön Ketterä, Olavi Uusivirta, Mura Masa, Bonobo, Alma
Saturday: Kube x Eevil Stöö, D.R.E.A.M.G.I.R.L.S., Anna Puu, 6lack, Charlotte Gainsbourg
Sunday: Ruusut, Jorja Smith, Brockhampton, Fever Ray, St. Vincent

Seat Black Tent
Friday: Ibe, Kynnet, Kakka-Hätä 77, Onni Boi, Sigrid, Joensuu 1685
Saturday: Mio, DJ Ibusal, Shame, Noname, 3TM in 3D, D.A.F.
Sunday: Stig Dogg, K-X-P, Fred Ventura, View, Tangerine Dream

Balloon 360° Stage
Friday: Kardemimmit, Karina, The Limiñanas, Olli Ahvenlahti New Quartet, KOKOKO!
Saturday: Mopo, Jukka Eskola & Umo, Lxandra, Lau Nau & Poseidon, Anna of the North, Orlando Julius & The Heliocentrics
Sunday: Yona & Lumos, Jukka Nousiainen & Kumpp., Moses Sumney, Kamasi Washington, Kevin Morby

Resident Advisor Front Yard
Friday: Daniel Kayrouz & Justus Valtanen, Young Marco, Peggy Gou, Imatran Voima, Sonja Moonear, Sammy Dee B2B Zip
Saturday: Zozo, Phuong-Dan, The Egyptian Lover, Veronica Vasicka, Detroit in Effect, Helena Hauff
Sunday: Khidja, Moxie, Yaeji, Broken English Club, Moodymann, Gerd Janson

The Other Sound @ Sun Effects Voimala
Friday: Meriheini Luoto & Mi-Rage, Terry Riley & Gyan Riley, Olli Aarni, Lena Platonos, Lubomyr Melnyk, Paavoharju
Saturday: Nyky Ensemble, Antti Tolvi, Abul Mogard, Suzanne Ciani, Kedr Livanskiy
Sunday: Hebo (Aapo Häkkinen & Dimitre Marinkev), Skidit Mega Disko, Suso Saiz, Tako, Michal Turtle, Jamie Tiller, Gigi Masin, Jamie Tiller B2B Tako, Jonny Nash

Backyard
Friday: Donna Leake, Dane, DJ Marcelle, Lil Tony, I-F
Saturday: Denzel & J.Lindroos, Dubby, Chee Shimizu, Sadar Bahar B2B Lee Collins, Joe Claussell
Sunday: Jen Ferrer, Cinema Royale, Ge-ology, Lauren Hansom, Colleen 'Cosmo' Murphy

Red Garden
Friday: Mikko Mattlar, Sansibar, Mad Miran, Peu, Lauri Soini, Volition Immanent, Kristiina Männikkö, Lena Popova
Saturday: Joshi, Hanna Ojanen, Siquiche, DJ Ramazotti, Handshaking, Bombarelli, Malin Nyqvist, DJ Lifegoals, Marju, Miska Tuiski, Marc Fred & Olli Koponen
Sunday: Masha, Krash Bandicute, Niko Hallikainen, Cute Cumber, Pekka Airaxin, Aake Kivalo, Yeboyah, Valley Girl, Yu Chuan, Pekko, Balearic Man, Mødya

Champagne Bar & Lounge
Friday: Eric Filipus & Imaginary _Frnd_
Saturday: Heikka Rissanen, Irene Kostas & Fummer
Sunday: Esko Routamaa

=== 2019 ===
Main Stage
Friday: Elias Gould, Earl Sweatshirt, Erykah Badu, Solange
Saturday: Gasellit, Seinabo Sey, Alma, Tame Impala
Sunday: J. Karjalainen, Chisu, Father John Misty, The Cure

Lapin Kulta Red Arena
Friday: Ville Valo & Agents, Ibe, Neneh Cherry, Pyhimys
Saturday: SOFA, Astrid Swan & Stina Koistinen featuring Owen Pallett, Ruusut, Blood Orange, Robyn
Sunday: Iisa, Pariisin Kevät, Modeselektor, Tove Lo, James Blake

Seat Black Tent
Friday: Karina, Katakombi, Maustetytöt, Slowthai, Nitzer Ebb, Leroy Burgess
Saturday: Bizi + F + Sitoi, Henrik!, Pond, Nao, Yves Tumor, Big Thief
Sunday: The Holy, Khruangbin, Mitski, Stereolab, Tommy Genesis

Nordea Globe Balloon Friday: Elifantree, M, Jonathan Wilson, Makaya McCraven, BCUC
Saturday: Pekko Käppi & K:H:H:L, Timo Lassy & Teppo Mäkynen, Jaakko Eino Kalevi, Nubya Garcia, Jesse Markin, Nyege Nyege: Bamba Pana & Makaveli
Sunday: Katu Kaiku, Suad, Cüneyt Sepetçi, Pharoah Sanders Quartet, Flohio

Resident Advisor Front Yard
Friday: Denzel & J. Lindroos, CCL, Ash Lauryn, DJ Python, Eva Geist, Donato Dozzy
Saturday: Yu Chuan, Carista, Juliana Huxtable, Katerina B2B Linda Lazarov, Dream 2 Science, The Black Madonna
Sunday: DJ Yeboyah, D. Tiffany, Baba Stiltz, K-HAND, Nina Kraviz

Reaktor Backyard
Friday: Sebastian Holm & Marju, Tomi K, Tone B. Nimble, Mafalda, Levon Vincent, Fred P
Saturday: Olli Koponen, Raw Silk, Jeremy Spellacey, Valesuchi, Palms Trax, Theo Parrish, Sansibar
Sunday: Disco Obscura, Nosedrip, Darryn Jones, Lauri Soini, Willikens & Ivkovic

The Other Sound
Friday: Hannu Salama & Vapaat Radikaalit, Maarja Nuut & Ruum, Tuomas A. Laitinen, Aïsha Devi, Jlin AV with Theresa Baumgartner
Saturday: NYKY Ensemble, Tristero Piano Trio, Saba Alizadeh, Ana Gutieszca, Vessel featuring Pedro Maia, Amnesia Scanner
Sunday: Mary Lattimore, Kelly Moran, Lanark Artefax, Quadrivium, Bendik Giske

Red Garden
Friday: Electronic Market, Jussi Niskanen, La Persé featuring Ray Noir, Emkay, Bernardino Femminielli, Janne X, Fecal Matter, House of Disappointments, Sasu Kauppi, DJ Wekesa
Saturday: Zoukous, Irene Kostas & Fummer, Casio G URL, UHA, DJ Renaz, Cinquantesix, Coco Ninja, My Neck My Back, House of Mizrahi Finland, Kiddy Smile
Sunday: Julius, ОГНИ, 12 Months of Pride, DJ Irma & Helmz, Between, Slaya Bit, House of Auer, Dustin Muchuvitz, Gabber Eleganza, Senzei, Karoliina Pärnänen, Lara Silva

Champagne Bar & Lounge
Friday: Maria Wesander, Lassi Jahnsson, Kalle Karvanen, Peu, Tapa Paha Tapa, Juuso Tervo, Teemu Keisteri
Saturday: Milk
Sunday: Ottopetteri & Krash Bandicute, Jenny Om & Handshaking, DJ Aleksi & Skenikswee

=== 2022 ===
Main Stage
Friday: Antti Autio + Jouset, Vesala, Sigrid, Burna Boy, Gorillaz
Saturday: F, Gettomasa, Vesta, Princess Nokia, Florence and the Machine
Sunday: Gasellit, Chisu, Michael Kiwanuka, Nick Cave and the Bad Seeds

Red Arena by Lapin Kulta Pure
Friday: Rosa Coste, Erika Vikman, Ibe, Jarv Is..., MØ
Saturday: Jesse Markin, Dreamworld, Bikini Kill, Freddie Gibbs, Jamie xx
Sunday: Louie Blue, GoldLink, Black Midi, Fred Again

Free.fi Black Tent
Friday: Pehmoaino, New Ro, Aldous Harding, Arppa, M Huncho
Saturday: Hassan Maikal, Ege Zulu, Malla, Yeboyah, Holly Humberstone, Fontaines D.C.
Sunday: William, Sexmane, Donny Benét, Q, Acid Arab

Balloon 360°
Friday: Vilma Jää, Johanna Juhola Reaktori, Isaac Sene, Nihiloxica, Alfa Mist
Saturday: Umo & Jimi Tenor, Kit Sebastian, Linda Fredriksson Juniper, Lxandra, Orchestra Baobab
Sunday: Pekka Laine & The Enchanted, Timo Lassy & Teppo Mäkynen, Pepe Willberg & Jukka Eskola, Brandee Younger Trio, Mdou Moctar, Erika de Casier

Resident Advisor Front Yard
Friday: Irma & Helmz, Electronic Market, Katerina, Uncle Waffles, Dixon, The Blessed Madonna
Saturday: Emkay, Lara Silva, Morphology, Mono Junk, Antti Salonen, Sherelle, Anz, DJ Stingray 313, Marcel Dettmann
Sunday: Eric Filipus, Jenifa, Julio Victoria, Heléna Star, DJ Holographic, DJ Tennis, DJ Koze

Backyard
Friday: Soul Survivors, Zernell, DJ Renaz, Yung Singh, OK Williams, Kamma & Masalo
Saturday: DJ Jese, Hanna Ojanen, Trujillo, Bárbara Boeing, Millos Kaiser, Lil Tony, Danilo Plessow / MCDE
Sunday: Skidi Backyard, Zoukous, Esa, Jayda G, Antal

The Other Sound x Sun Effects
Friday: Heli Hartikainen, Project Vainiolla, Caterina Barbieri, Trains, Huoratron
Saturday: Katri Naukari & Janne Myllymäki, Nyky Ensemble, Ville Herrala & Antti Lötjönen, Marja Ahti, Cucina Povera, Tuomas A. Laitinen & Sapiduz Ensemble
Sunday: Ona Kamu, Ánnámáret (Anna Näkkäläjärvi-Länsman), AT/PT, Smerz, KMRU, Islaja

Red Garden
Friday: Anna Vänttinen, Denzel, Liskokuningatar, Elina Tapio, Naks, Lazercat, Cardinal & Nun, Coco Ninja & Iconic House of Ninja, Mike Q
Saturday: OLB, DJ Wuf, Jaakko Rintala, Alec Sibbald, Essi Eirene, Eleonora Šljanda, Maria Wesander, Precious Bloom, Karlainthemix, Marcia Carr
Sunday: Lauri Soini, OK Sound, Jussi Kantonen, DJ Paulette, Giant Swan, Patrick Mason

Champagne Bar & Lounge
Friday: DJ Bunuel, Hitoshi, Joshi DJ, TBoy, Box'n'Dice
Saturday: Vesa Liede, Marc Fred, Miia Laine, Joseysradios, Cumbia Beat, DJ Wekesa
Sunday: Afro Sunday DJs

=== 2023 ===
Main Stage

Friday: Litku Klemetti Viihdeorkesteri, Paperi T, Anna Puu, Suede, Wizkid

Saturday: Yona & Tapiola Sinfonietta, Pehmoaino, Seinabo Sey, Devo, Lorde

Sunday: Maustetytöt, Olavi Uusivirta, Caroline Polachek, Blur

Silver Arena

Friday: Kube, Ege Zulu, Alma, 070 Shake, Kaytranada

Saturday: Sofa, Karri Koira, Ruusut, Pusha T, Tove Lo

Sunday: Eevil Stöö & Stepa, Sexmane, Moderat, Christine and the Queens

Black Tent

Friday: Nelma U & SAFIRA, Melo, Business City, Kelela, Jockstrap, Shygirl

Saturday: Bizi, Kissa, Markus Krunegård, Pearly Drops, Nu Genea Live Band, Amyl and the Sniffers

Sunday: Jami Faltin, Pihlaja, Mauskovic Dance Band, High Vis, Sudan Archives

Balloon 360°

Friday: Elsi Sloan, Ne Galaktiset, Tuomo & Markus featuring Verneri Pohjola, Nala Sinephro, Esa's Afro-Synth Band featuring Kamazu

Saturday: Kaisa's Machine, Jake Xerxes Fussell, Arp Frique & Family, Meshell Ndegeocello, Alogte Oho and his Sounds of Joy

Sunday: Sonia, Olli Ahvenlahti, Valtteri Laurell Nonet, DOMi & JD BECK, Horace Andy & Dub Asante Band featuring Matic Horns, Balming Tiger

Resident Advisor Front Yard

Friday: Xample, Modem, Jaye Ward, Chaos in the CBD, Carlina Carpelan, Speedy J, Nene H

Saturday: HiToshi, All Good Soundsystem, Jori Hulkkonen, DJ Voices, Jyoty, Sansibar, Louie Vega, Tereza

Sunday: Knife Girl, Ima Iduozee, Coco Ninja, Joseysradios, Waxfiend, Folamour, Eris Drew & Octo Octa

Backyard

Friday: Justus Arvelin, Renata do Valle, Habibi Funk, Kampire, John Gómez, Hunee

Saturday: Marc Fred B2B Maria Wesander, Victoria B2B Ocean People, 12 Months of Pride, DJ Mojo, Gop Tun, Nooriyah, Lil Tony

Sunday: Skidi Takapiha, Awesome Tapes From Africa, Arp Frique B2B Coco María, Sadar Bahar B2B Ge-ology

The Other Sound × Sun Effects

Friday: Meriheini Luoto, Arushi Jain, Brìghde Chaimbeul, Mikko Sarvanne Garden

Saturday: NYKY Ensemble ja Liisa Pentti +Co: Ref2022, The New Boyfriends, Maya Shenfeld, Timo Kaukolampi

Sunday: Teddy Rok, Claire Rousay, Mario Batkovic, Mika Kallio

X Garden

Friday: DJ Lulu, DJ Renaz, FWU, Yeboyah, C.Frim, Mora

Saturday: Mechanic, MFM, Inter Alia & Niko Demus, DJ JVS, Yung Sherman, DJSoulSeek, Glayden, Paul Seul

Sunday: Little Miss Anti-Social Butterfly 2.0 Effective Voluptuous, Joonas K, CNA, Sallidoing, Lara Silva, CEB, Miika2theMax, DJ Heartstring

Champagne Bar & Lounge

Friday: Matti Nives, Toimi Tytti, Fiona Timantti, Synteettinen Suomi, WILLAMOMAFIA, PAHA VAANII

Saturday: DJ Hermanni, DJ Goodblood, DJ Hamm, DJ Hansin / MC Enoch Gyasi & Aakusti, Aah!

Sunday: Zesty, Galactic Mace, Suva, Sami Sierla, Ana Coudurier, DJ Kurro, Galactic Mace

=== 2024 ===
Main Stage
Friday, 9 August	Saturday, 10 August	Sunday, 11 August
Halsey; Raye; Isac Elliot; Jesse Markin	Fred again..; PJ Harvey; Karri Koira; Ege Zulu & Orchestre; Goldielocks	Pulp; Jessie Ware; Gasellit; Arppa & Sunnuntain seireenit

Silver Arena
Friday, 9 August	Saturday, 10 August	Sunday, 11 August
Janelle Monáe; Idles; Vince Staples; Antti Autio 4; Yeboyah	Aurora; Overmono; Yves Tumor; Vesta; SMC	James Blake; Kenya Grace; L'Impératrice; Lauri Haav

Black Tent
Friday, 9 August	Saturday, 10 August	Sunday, 11 August
Evian Christ; Ecco2k; Blonde Redhead; Miriam Bryant; Jambo	Barry Can't Swim; Joalin; Malla; Jimi Tenor & Jori Hulkkonen; Shrty; Turisti	Artemas; Alvvays; Knife Girl; Glayden

Balloon 360°
Friday, 9 August	Saturday, 10 August	Sunday, 11 August
Kokoko!; Thee Sacred Souls; Arooj Aftab; Nabihah Iqbal; The Holy	47Soul; serpentwithfeet; The Stance Brothers; Precious Bloom; Verneri Pohjola: Monkey Mind; Tinyhawk & Bizzarro	Grande Mahogany; Another Taste; Marcos Valle; Selma Savolainen Horror Vacui; Lassy-Eskola: Nordic Stew; Inginmaa/Hypnomen

Resident Advisor Front Yard
Friday, 9 August	Saturday, 10 August	Sunday, 11 August
Young Marco; DJ Gigola; DJ Spit; Pablo Bozzi; Emkay; Mr Velcro Fastener; Malin Nyqvist; Laura MRLS	Helena Hauff; Héctor Oaks; Paula Koski; Animistic Beliefs; DJ JVS; Jeku; Mary Young; ATI	Job Jobse; Lsdxoxo; Denzel & Joni DJ; DJ Fart in the Club; MORA; Marju; Karoliina Pärnänen

Heineken Backyard
Friday, 9 August	Saturday, 10 August	Sunday, 11 August
Body & Soul: Danny Krivit, Joe Claussell & François K; DESIREE; Blck Mamba; Katerina; All Good Soundsystem; Siquiche	Jeffrey Sfire; Norsicaa; Dea; Ilan (Night City Life); Bayetë; Jussi Kantonen b2b Juuso Tervo; Ana Coudurier b2b Jaakko Rintala	livwutang; Esa b2b Suze Ijó; Nala Brown; Sophia Wekesa

The Other Sound
Friday, 9 August	Saturday, 10 August	Sunday, 11 August
Sami Klemola: Ground; Heikki Lindgren & Merle Karp; Evicshen	Lau Nau & Pauliina Mäkelä; One Leg One Eye; Maija Kauhanen & Hugh Sheehan; NYKY Ensemble plays Kaija Saariaho	Saxtronauts; Zöllner-Roche Duo; Clarissa Connelly; Masayoshi Fujita

X Garden
Friday, 9 August	Saturday, 10 August	Sunday, 11 August
CRYSTALLMESS; LCY B2B Exploited Body; Nazar; Max Jaarte; SITOI; 111X; Hollowland; Megabondmon	Herrensauna; SPFDJ; CEM; MCMLXXXV; DJ Saliva	Narciss; KORGY: KEMIK b2b CEB b2b 2THEMAX; NOEI; Sallidoing; Lara Silva; Saffet; Aino Collin

Lanson Champagne Bar & Lounge
Friday, 9 August	Saturday, 10 August	Sunday, 11 August
Yalla Collective; Renaz; DJ Coco; Yallah; Trabelsi; Yalla Collective	Soul Search; DJ Hotleevibling & long legs; DJ Aleksi & Handshaking; Maria Wesander	Hitoshi & Justus; Andre Pozusis; suinner + trabelsi

=== 2025 ===
Main Stage
Friday, 8 August	Saturday, 9 August	Sunday, 10 August
FKA twigs; Air play Moon Safari; Turisti; Saimaa	Burna Boy; Little Simz; Veronica Maggio; Ege Zulu; good boys	Charli XCX; Lola Young; Sexmane; Mirella

Silver Arena
Friday, 8 August	Saturday, 9 August	Sunday, 10 August
Bicep present CHROMA; Black Star; Montell Fish; Regina: Soita mulle; Litku Klemetti	Underworld; Yung Lean & Bladee; Beth Gibbons; Ruusut; Pehmoaino: Sätkynukkekoti	Khruangbin; Fontaines D.C.; Pariisin Kevät; Emma & Matilda

Black Tent
Friday, 8 August	Saturday, 9 August	Sunday, 10 August
Goldielocks; Autechre; Sudan Archives; MELO; Tohtori Getto & Axel Kala	Kneecap; Sam Quealy; Oranssi Pazuzu; Jore & Zpoppa; Olga; Aaro630	Amaarae; Uusi Fantasia; DJ Ibusal; Senya

Balloon 360°
Friday, 8 August	Saturday, 9 August	Sunday, 10 August
Florence Adooni; Fabiana Palladino; Frankosun and the Family; Vilma Jää; Wishamalii	Oby Onyioha feat. Sai Galaxy; Infinity Song; Tarta Relena; Emilia Sisco & the Northern Lights; ALAWARI; Hassan Maikal & Sointi Jazz Orchestra	LA LOM; Arp Frique & The Perpetual Singers; Hermeto Pascoal & Grupo; The Five Corners Quintet; Superposition

The Other Sound
Friday, 8 August	Saturday, 9 August	Sunday, 10 August
Apni aka Surabhi Saraf; Ganavya; Keval Shah; Ada Aik & Choir: 5 Hours of Light – Scented Concert	Symbiocene; Andrea Belfi; Antti Lötjönen & Kalle Kalima; Ada Aik & Choir: 5 Hours of Light – Scented Concert	Passepartout Duo; Harri Kuusijärvi & Arttu Nieminen; KO:MI; Ada Aik & Choir: 5 Hours of Light – Scented Concert

Heineken Backyard
Friday, 8 August	Saturday, 9 August	Sunday, 10 August
Antal; Danilo Plessow aka MCDE; Colleen 'Cosmo' Murphy; DJ Aleksi B2B HiToshi; Do U Remember House	Batu; Lil Tony; DJ EZ; CC:DISCO!; Trevor Deep Jr. B2B All Good Soundsystem; Hanna Ojanen	Paula Tape; Horse Meat Disco; Cormac; 12 Months of Pride

Front Yard
Friday, 8 August	Saturday, 9 August	Sunday, 10 August
Verraco; Avalon Emerson; Joy Orbison; NIGHT manoeuvres; Mala; Mary Young; ZEZE	Funk Tribu; CEB B2B Lara Silva; Orkidea; Voices from the Lake (Live); Wata Igarashi (Live); Aurora Halal; Katerina; Justus Valtanen B2B Daniel Kayrouz	Ellen Allien; okgiorgio; Sansibar; ATI; Otilia B2B Ojelma; Sallidoing

X Garden
Friday, 8 August	Saturday, 9 August	Sunday, 10 August
DJ Fuckoff; Clementaum; Evissimax B2B s4int nich0las; The Good Time Girl; CNA; Sala; DJ SNAPDRAGON	Major League DJz; Joseysradios; Will Nams & Kuya Kai; DJ Seben; DJ Qwelz; NOSLEEP	2THEMAX; BAMBII; Fame Hunter; TOCCORORO; Katvyl; Nea2k; Aino Collin; she's so annoying!!!

Champagne Bar & Lounge
Friday, 8 August	Saturday, 9 August	Sunday, 10 August
SomBadi & Herkules; Jonttu Luhtavaara & SomBadi; DJ Imppu K; Herkules & Lina Schiffer; Andre Pozusis; Herkules & Huliaanos	€TOM; Mr. A; DJ WUF; hotleevibling & long legs; Victoria & Essi Eirene; DJ Harvest & DJ Pipu; bilar	SOLI

== Flow Festival Ljubljana ==
Aside from Helsinki, Flow Festival was also held in Ljubljana, Slovenia at the Tobačna Mesto site. Flow Festival Ljubljana was only held once in 2015.

=== 2015 ===
Main Stage
Friday: The Stubs, Edo Maajka, José González, Metronomy
Saturday: Jardier, Jonathan, Torul, Bad Copy, Run the Jewels, Pet Shop Boys
Sunday: New Wave Syria, Artan Lili, Polona Kasal x KALU, Caribou, Róisín Murphy

Ljubljana Backyard
Friday: Symann, Ian F., Aneuria, Kiki, DJ Koze, Derrick May
Saturday: Splinterhouse, Niplodok, Trevor Deep Jr, Felver, Bonobo, San Proper, Hunee, Antal
Sunday: Fraku, Nitz, Roiss, Evano, Tijana T, Lil Tony, Dixon, Âme, Recondite

Gallery Bar
Friday: Disco Durum, Zhe, Bakto, Ule Nakova, Ichisan
Saturday: E.B. King, Wichiwaka, Tha Disko Don, Dulash Der, Vuka
Sunday: Loutseau, Sunny Sun, Woo D, Puff, Softskinson S.S.S., Marta
