= Human Torch (disambiguation) =

Human Torch is Marvel Comics superhero and a member of the Fantastic Four.

Human Torch may also refer to:

== Media ==
- Human Torch (android), the original Marvel Comics Human Torch, is an android superhero from the Golden Age of Comics, who has appeared in some comics set in the present day, including a brief membership in the Avengers
- "The Human Torch", episode of The Fall Guy, Season One, 1981

== Music ==
- "Human Torch", a song by the punk rock band Rocket from the Crypt from The State of Art Is on Fire EP, 1995
- "Human Torch", a song by Damn Seagulls
- "Human Torch", a song by Fastball from Make Your Mama Proud, 1998
