= Nigerians in Finland =

Nigerians in Finland / Finnish Nigerians Nigerialaiset Suomessa / Suomen nigerialaiset

Total population
- 6,155 Nigerian citizens; 6,763 born in Nigeria (2025)

Regions with significant populations
- Helsinki, Turku and Tampere regions & Vaasa and Kuopio

Languages
- Finnish, Swedish, English

Religion
- Islam, Christianity

Nigerians in Finland are people who originate from Nigeria and who live in Finland. People can be born in Nigeria, have Nigerian ancestry and/or be citizens of Nigeria. As of 2025, there were 6,763 people born in Nigeria living in Finland. Similarly, the number of people with Nigerian citizenship was 6,155. Nigerians are Finland's second largest African immigrant group after Somalis.

== Demographics ==
Historical population
Year	Pop.	±% p.a.
1990	89	—
1995	208	+18.50%
2000	291	+6.95%
2005	515	+12.09%
2010	1,385	+21.88%
2015	2,400	+11.62%
2020	3,055	+4.94%
2025	6,763	+17.23%
Nigerian-borns. Source: Statistics Finland

People born in Nigeria and living in Finland, according to Statistics Finland.

Country of birth Nigeria by municipality (2024)
Municipality	Population
Whole country	5,959
Helsinki	1,315
Vantaa	766
Espoo	654
Tampere	490
Turku	385
Vaasa	303
Kuopio	292
Oulu	233
Jyväskylä	157
Joensuu	131
Lappeenranta	93
Lahti	80
Kokkola	78
Kerava	68
Jakobstad	66
Pori	65
Järvenpää	57
Seinäjoki	50
Hämeenlinna	41
Riihimäki	38
Kajaani	32
Rovaniemi	26
Hyvinkää	23
Lieksa	23
Varkaus	23
Salo	21
Nurmes	20
Porvoo	19
Forssa	19
Kemi	18
Valkeakoski	16
Nurmijärvi	16
Savonlinna	16
Iisalmi	15
Rauma	15
Kotka	14
Kauniainen	14
Tuusula	13
Ylöjärvi	12
Laitila	11
Uusikaupunki	11
Lohja	10

== Society ==
Many Nigerian women seeking asylum in Finland are victims of human trafficking.

== Notable people ==
- Noah Kin, rapper
- Nnaemeka Anyamele, footballer
- Nicholas Otaru, footballer
- Lola Odusoga, model
- Seppo Evwaraye, athlete
- Simon Ekpa, Lahti politician, Biafra separatist, and former athlete
