= Ruudolf =

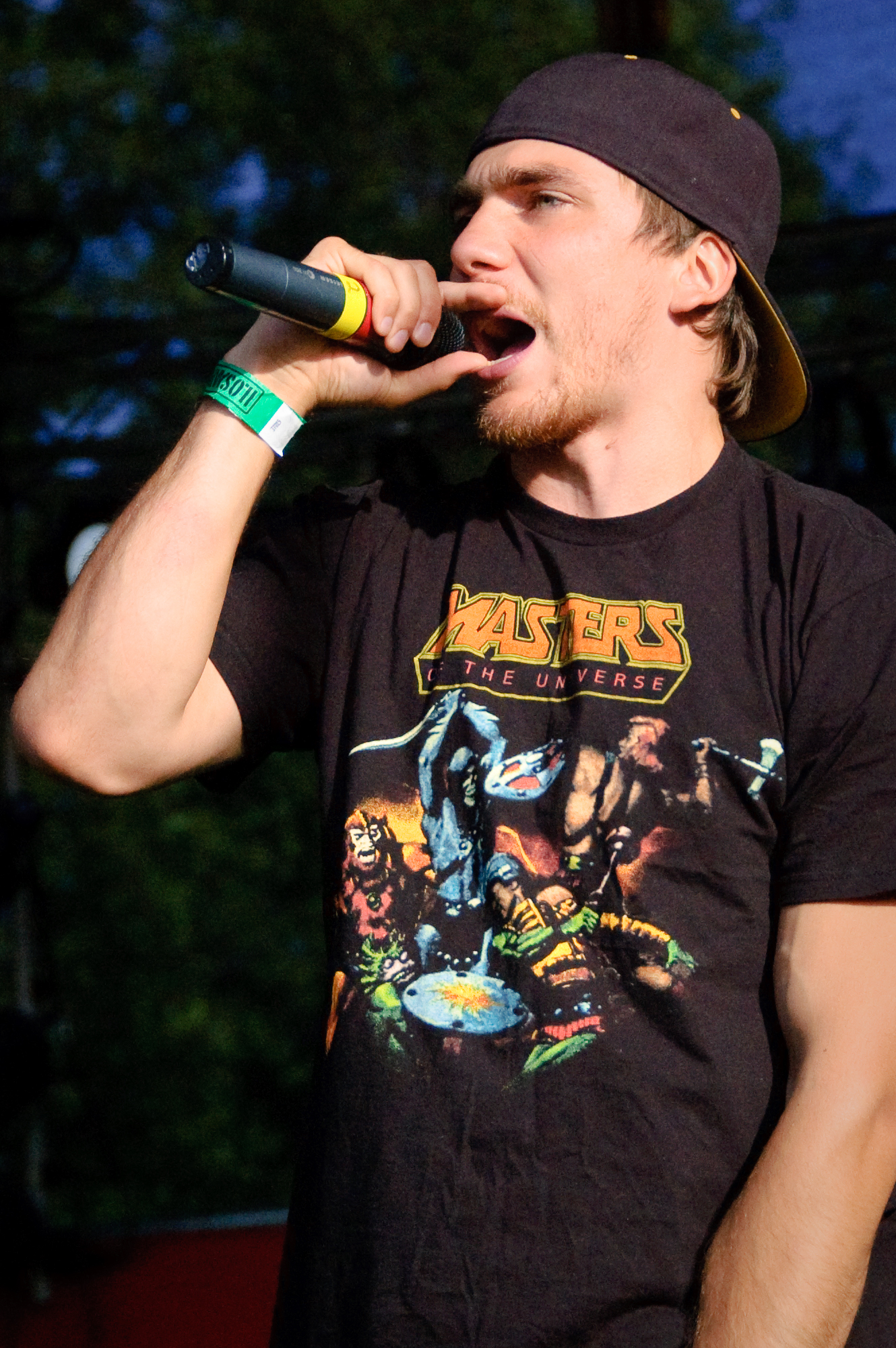
- Ruudolf performing at the Ilosaarirock festival in Joensuu, Finland.

Background information
- Born: Rudy Frans Kulmala; 1983 (age 42–43)
- Origin: Helsinki, Finland
- Genre: Rap
- Label: Monsp
- Website: monsp.com/ruudolf/

Ruudolf (born Rudy Frans Kulmala in 1983) is a Finnish hip hop artist. He is known for his calm flow and energetic live performances. He rhymes in Finnish.

== Career ==
His debut album Doupeimmat Jumala Seivaa climbed on the 18th place on Finland's official album list after its release in 2004. Ruudolf has won the Finnish freestyle and battle rap championship two times. First in 2001, being only 17 years old at the time. His latest win came in 2005, already being an accomplished artist in Finland. Before starting his career as a solo artist, Ruudolf was a part of the group ‘Vähäiset Äänet’. His friend Karri Koira (also former member of Vähäiset Äänet) is often seen by his side during live performances. Karri Koira also features on many of his recordings.

== Personal life ==
He grew up in Herttoniemi, Helsinki. He is a quarter Mexican and a faithful Christian. This can be heard in his lyrics. He used to drink alcohol and smoke cannabis. He says that after he found God, his life took a complete turnaround – he has since quit using drugs, drinking and smoking. His debut album, Doupeimmat Jumala Seivaa roughly translates to God Saves the Dopest.

== Discography ==
Albums

- Vaimo CD (vanity version 2003, vinyl Monsp 2005)
- Doupeimmat Jumala Seivaa (Monsp 2004)
- Semi-HotRUUDOLF MEGAMIXTAPE (Monsp 2006)
- Born in the U.S.A. (Monsp 2008)
- Asvalttisoturin viimeinen hidas (Monsp 2010)

Others

- Ruudolf Multishow DVD (2006)
