= Damn Seagulls =

Finnish rock group

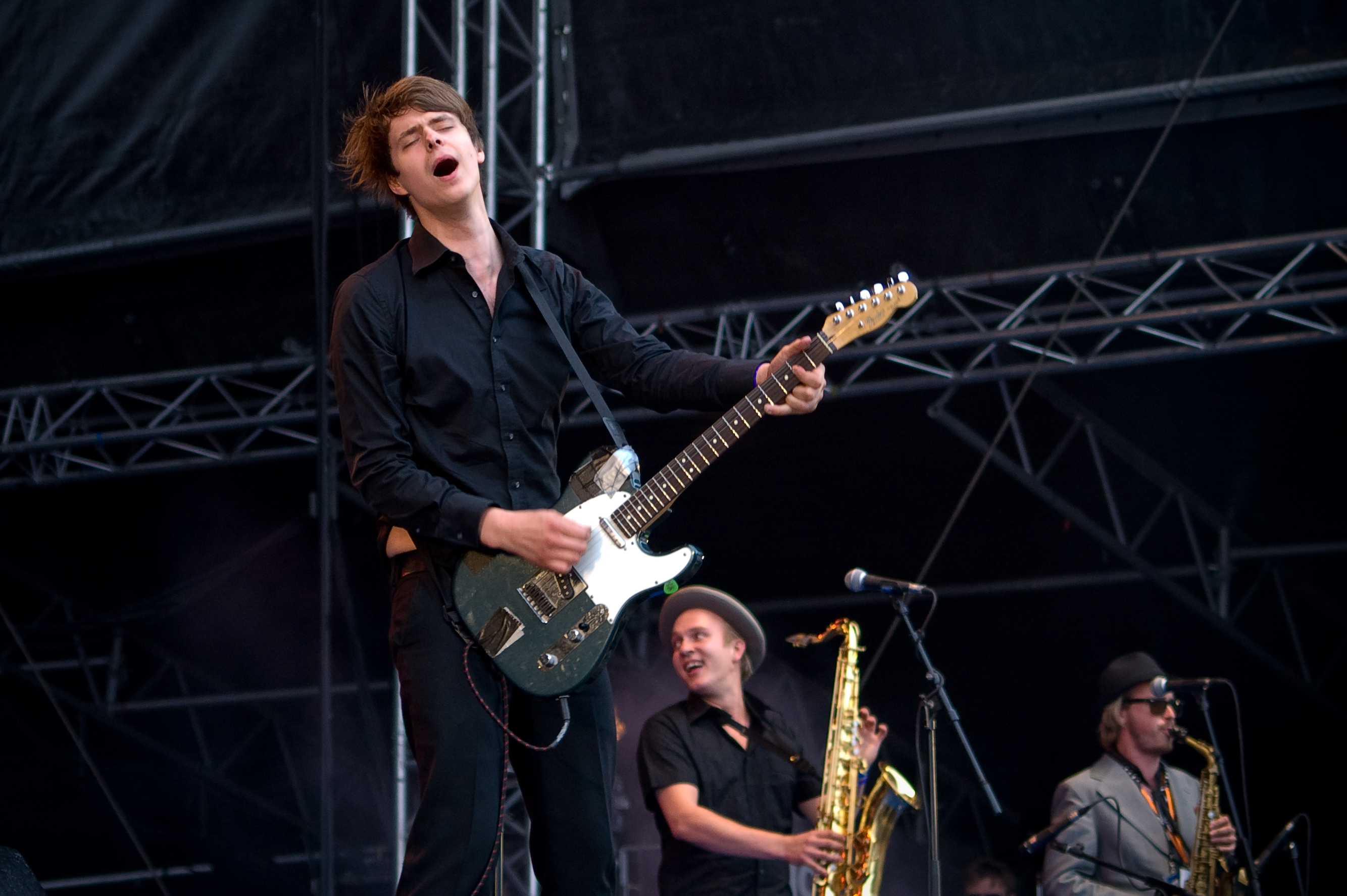

Background information
- Origin: Helsinki, Finland
- Genres: Rock; punk; indie
- Years active: 1997–present
- Label: Fullsteam Records
- Members: Jami Auvinen; Lauri Eloranta; Niko Kangas; Olli Noroviita; Jani Liuhanen; With: Tommi Salminen; Martti Vesala
- Past members: Matti Koivisto; Aki Karppanen; Toni Koskinen
- Website: Official website

Damn Seagulls is a rock group from Helsinki, Finland.

== History ==
Damn Seagulls is a Finnish-rock group, formed in 1997 in Helsinki. They're also noted for their hit single "Once Upon a Time" is featured of the credits of The Dudesons Movie & their TV Show. Their rock style is kind of different from other Rock bands due to their use of brass instruments and woodwind instruments to make catchy tunes. The band is currently playing shows in many parts of Finland.

They have released two full-length album entitled "One Night at Sirdie's" in 2005 and "Soul Politics" in January 2007. In February 2007 Damn Seagulls will start 'Soul Politics' tour around Finland. In February 2007 Damn Seagulls has released their first video 'Human Torch'. 15 May 2007 the band informed at their website that Aki Karppanen is no longer the drummer of the band. On 29 May 2007 the band announced on their website that on the gigs of summer 2007 Kelly Ketonen (Lemonator, Anssi Kela -live band, ex-Hybrid Children) will be playing drums. On 20 June 2007 it was reported on the band's website, that Toni Koskinen will leave the band due to his dislike of the band's current style and Olli Noroviita from the band Cosmobile will replace Koskinen on bass. Koskinen played his last gig as a member of the band 14 September 2007. On 9 October 2007, it was announced that Tommi Salminen (Tigerbombs, Ville Leinonen & Valumo) would be playing drums on the future gigs.

== Members ==
- Jami Auvinen: guitar, vocals
- Lauri Eloranta: lead vocals, guitar
- Niko Kangas: tenor saxophone, vocals
- Olli Noroviita: bass, vocals
- Jani Liuhanen: organ

With:

- Tommi Salminen: drums, vocals
- Martti Vesala: trumpet, vocals

Former Members:

- Kelly Ketonen: drums (2007)
- Aki Karppanen: drums (?–2007)
- Matti Koivisto: drums
- Toni Koskinen: bass

== Discography ==
Year	Title	Peak position
Year	Title	FIN
2005	One Night at Sirdies	40
2005	Soul Politics	9
2005	Hunting Season	25
2014	Let It Shine	48

=== Track lists ===
- Cool by Nature (mcd) (2002)
1. "The Brutus"
2. "Do What You Gotta Do"
3. "Right in the Nerve"
4. "Happy End?"
- One Night at Sirdies (2005)
1. "All Rise" 3:34
2. "Brutus" 3:05
3. "Heart on the Sleeve" 5:24
4. "Stony Ground" 3:05
5. "Helsinki Runaway" 4:26
6. "Once Upon a Time" 3:55
7. "Further & Away" 3:49
8. "Where the Whales Go to Die" 2:28
9. "Jesus Stole My Baby" 3:27
10. "I´m Healed" 5:25
- Soul Politics (2007)
1. "Once We Were Thieves" 2:43
2. "While I'm Gone" 4:11
3. "24 Uptown" 3:29
4. "Quality People" 4:11
5. "Dirty Soul Radio" 3:32
6. "Rooftops & Railways" 3:26
7. "Human Torch" 3:22
8. "The Beat" 4:28
9. "Something About It" 4:31
10. "King of Fools" 5:39
- Hunting Season (2009)
1. "Lord of the Flies"
2. "Novus Ordo Mundi"
3. "Dead Pigeons"
4. "Libertine"
5. "The City Takes Care of It"
6. "Mad Max"
7. "Gone by the Dawn"
8. "New Breed"
9. "The Moon Keeps Me Co."
10. "Sunday 6 AM"

=== Songs ===
- Cool by Nature (mcd) (2002)
- Once Upon A Time/Jesus Stole My Baby (2004)
- Further & Away (7") (2005)
- The Beat (2006)
- Human Torch (2006)
- 24 Uptown (7") (2007)
- Something About It (promo) (2007)
- The City Takes Care of It (29 October 2008)
- Libertine (17 January 2009)
