= Aapo Häkkinen =

Finnish musician and conductor (born 1976)

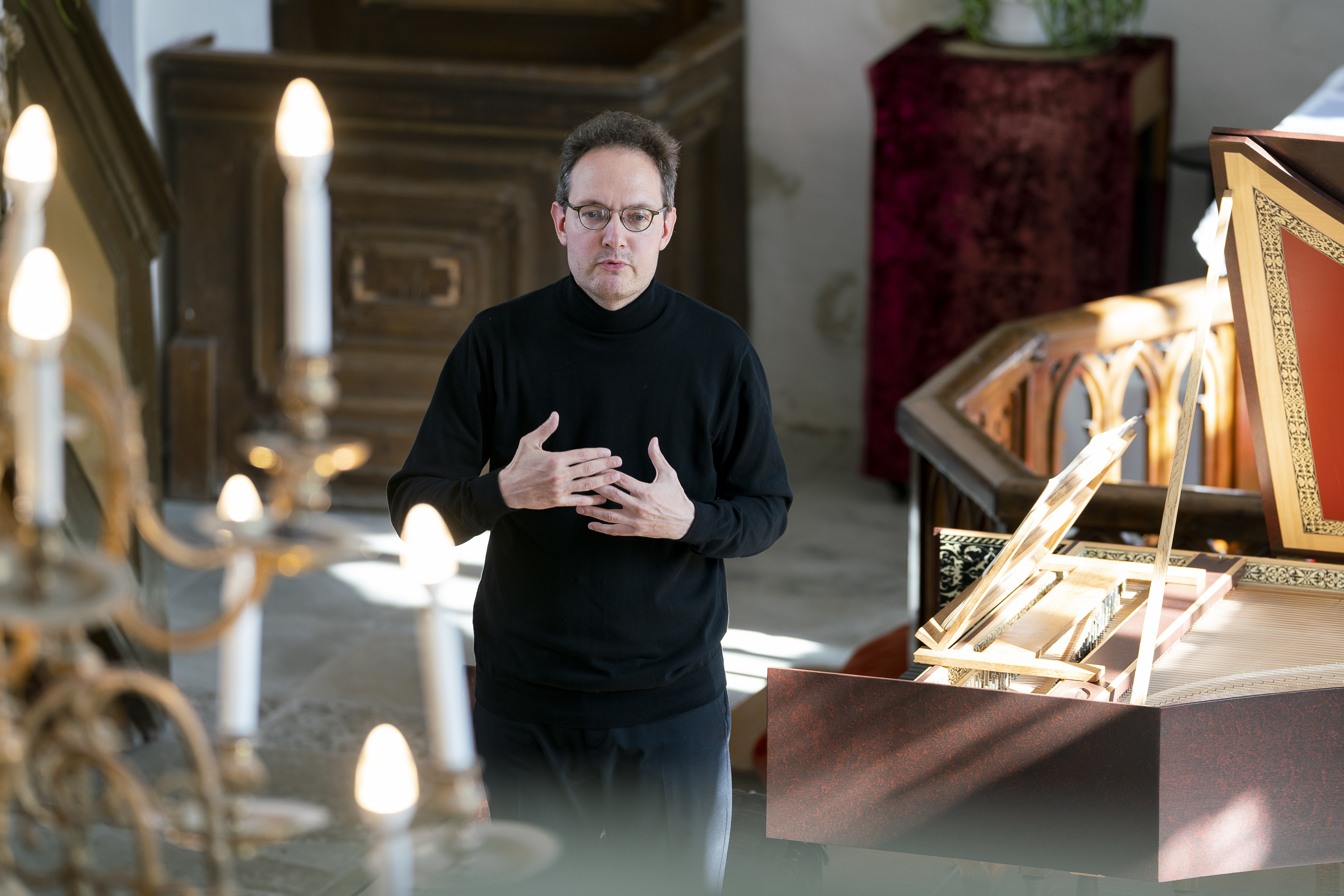
Image of Aapo Häkkinen

Aapo Häkkinen is a Finnish harpsichordist and conductor.

== Biography and career ==
Aapo Häkkinen was born in Helsinki, Finland, and began studying harpsichord at the Sibelius Academy in Helsinki at the age of 13. He later studied with Bob van Asperen, at the Amsterdam Sweelinck Conservatoire, and with Pierre Hantaï in Paris. He also benefited from the guidance and encouragement of Gustav Leonhardt.

Häkkinen won second prize and the VRT prize at the Bruges International Harpsichord Competition in 1998, as well as the Norddeutscher Rundfunk special prize. He has performed as a soloist in most European countries, and, as a chamber musician and director, has collaborated with Reinhard Goebel, Erich Höbarth, Riccardo Minasi and many others. He has been a director of many ensembles, and has conducted many works, including Handel's Acis and Galatea and Haydn's L'isola disabitata for the Finnish Chamber Opera, and Monteverdi's L'incoronazione di Poppea for the Finnish National Opera.

Häkkinen made his Edinburgh International Festival debut in August 2019 with a recital of Bach keyboard concertos.

Häkkinen teaches at the Sibelius Academy and gives master-classes around the world, and is artistic director of the Helsinki Baroque Orchestra.

Häkkinen has recorded music by composers such as Bach, Byrd, Frescobaldi, Haydn, Rameau, and Richter, for the AEOLUS, Alba, Avie, Cantus, Deux-Elles, Naxos, and Ondine record labels. He has also recorded for numerous European radio and television companies, and hosts his own programme on Rondo Classic FM in Finland.

In addition to playing the harpsichord, Häkkinen regularly performs on the organ and on the clavichord.
