= Death Hawks =

Finnish psychedelic rock band

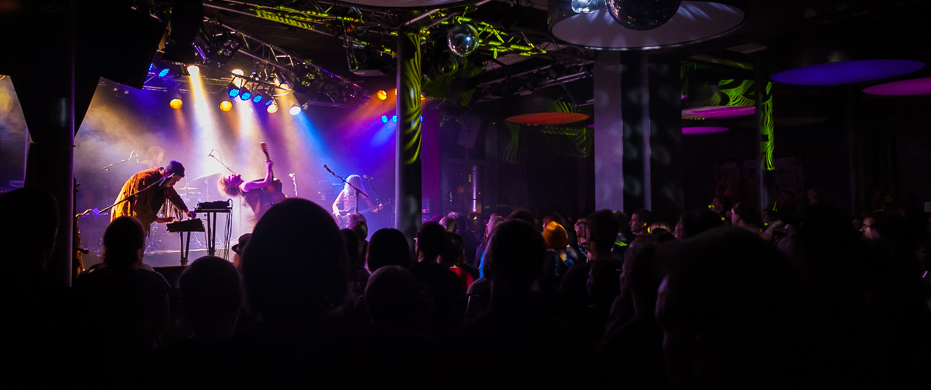
- Death Hawks, Monsters Of Pop Festival 2013, photo: Sakari Karipuro

Background information
- Origin: Riihimäki, Finland
- Genre: Psychedelic rock
- Years active: 2011–present
- Label: Svart Records
- Spinoff of: Genzale
- Members: Teemu Markkula; Tenho Mattila; Riku Pirttiniemi; Miikka Heikkinen; Jonne Pitkänen (live visuals); Ilari Larjosto (sound)
- Website: www.deathhawks.com

Death Hawks is a Finnish psychedelic rock band formed in 2011.

== History ==
Death Hawks was put together in the spring of 2010 to arrange and record songs by singer Teemu Markkula, but it soon metamorphosed into a solid band. Death Hawks played its first show with a complete lineup in April 2011.

Death Hawks’ intense live shows, with their psychedelic meanderings, soon created an organic hype around the band. Death Hawks recorded their debut album “Death & Decay” in the summer of 2011 and it was released in February 2012 through Tampere-based GAEA records. Death & Decay received generally good reviews and the music media noticed the new and young psychedelic rock band singing about dark subjects (usually addressed by heavier bands) combining e.g. blues and krautrock to a folkier songwriting with their psychedelic way. Media started to talk about the band as a future Finnish music export name. Death & Decay reached number 10 on Finnish album charts.

After the record release the band continued to do shows with a more frequent pace touring all over Finland and from January 2013 on touring across Europe too. In January the band did a week long Swedish tour and some shows in The Netherlands. In April 2013 Death Hawks did a small Finnish tour with Graveyard from Sweden and in May participated in Fullsteam Ahead Tour (organised together by Makia Clothing and Lapin Kulta) which featured selected Finnish bands touring with a steamboat in the Finnish archipelago. A document film was released from the tour. In the winter and spring of 2013 Death Hawks also started the recording of their sophomore album.

The self-titled second album came out September 2013 from GAEA Records. The album “Death Hawks” reached number 15 on Finnish album charts. After some shows in Finland Death Hawks joined the German hard rock band Kadavar for their tour in Germany and Austria in October 2013. January 2014 Death Hawks did a short Scandinavian tour followed by two gigs in Oslo, Norway where the album “Death Hawks” was among the top 10 finalists nominated for Nordic Music Prize 2013 (an annual award for the Best Nordic Album Of The Year). Death Hawks’ second album got also nominated in Emma gala 2014 (the “Finnish Grammys”) and it was chosen as the best album of 2013 by Soundi magazine.

In May 2014 the band did their first longer European tour including Sweden, Poland, Germany, Austria, Hungary and Croatia. In summer they performed near every weekend playing the biggest festivals in Finland and also stopping by in Sweden and Russia. October 2014 Death Hawks toured Germany and later that year performed in UK, Poland and France.

In the beginning of 2015 Death Hawks started to write new material for their third studio album. In April they had a brief break from studio work to play at Roadburn Festival in Netherlands. In May the band headed to Suomenlinna Studios with producer Janne Lastumäki and engineer Ilari Larjosto. By the end of the summer the album was ready to be sent to press. In that summer Death Hawks also did some shows in Finland, Germany and Sweden. On November 13, 2015 the album Sun Future Moon was released through Svart Records. In November and December the band also did a vast tour of Finland and a smaller tour in Norway. In Finland they toured with the experimental rock band Circle.

The year 2016 was all about playing shows and touring for Death Hawks. They played close to a hundred shows and did three wider tours that year. In March they did a Finnish tour and in April Death Hawks embarked on a month long European Tour called Cobra Run 2016. After that the band played a lot of summer festivals and in September they headed back to Central Europe and Scandinavia for a couple of weeks. The rest of the year Death Hawks continued playing shows and did a couple also with the Swedish Blues Pills.

The members of Death Hawks also had a previous band together in 2005-2007 called Genzale. This band featured all of the members from Death Hawks plus a second guitarist Niko Matiskainen. Genzale recorded one promotional album in 2006 which consisted of eight songs and was never released officially.

== Discography ==
=== Albums ===
- Death & Decay (Gaea Records) (2012)
- Death Hawks (Gaea Records) (2013)
- Sun Future Moon (Svart Records) (2015)
- Psychic Harmony (Svart Records) (2019)

=== EP's and Singles ===
- Humanoids - single" (Digital single Gaea Records) (2013)
- Death Hawks / Kiki Pau - Split 7" (Promotional release by Music Finland) (2013)
- The song "Buddiman" by Death Hawks was released on Vähän multaa päälle compilation album (Fonal Records) (2012)

== Band members ==
Current members

- Teemu Markkula – vocals, guitar
- Riku Pirttiniemi – bass, vocals
- Tenho Mattila – keyboards, synthesizers, saxophone
- Miikka Heikkinen – drums, percussion
