= Pekko Käppi =

Jouhikko musician (b. 1976)

Pekko Käppi (born 1976) is a jouhikko musician from Tampere and a part-time teacher at the Sibelius Academy. He is also a composer, a producer and a researcher. He is trained as an ethnomusicologist, specializing in traditional folk music. He performs together with his band K:H:H:L, which stands for kuolleiden hevosten hillittömät luut 'the bones of dead horses out of control'.

== Early life ==
In 1993–94, when he was 17 years old, Käppi spent a year in the United States as an exchange student. The son of his host family was a fan of Grateful Dead, and through him, Käppi became familiar with the band's music, which consisted of rock and improvised music based on folk music. This provoked his interest in the sources of that music, especially in Finnish folk music.

Another important influence for Käppi has been Värttinä, which caused him to look into the folk music collections of his local library.

In 1997, Käppi got a chance to study folk music in Kaustinen, at the Ala-Könni Folk High School, where he began to play the jouhikko. At the time, he was frustrated with the guitar and felt it had too many strings and too much of everything in general.

In 1998, Käppi played in the streets with a friend who played the bagpipe. The sound of the jouhikko could barely be heard, and Käppi felt he needed an amplifier. The device had to be a small one, so he could carry it around, but the result was that he had to crank it up, thus producing a distorted sound. This is how he found his own sound, which has remained almost unchanged ever since then.

== Solo career ==
In 2001, Käppi released his debut record, a four-song EP titled Kalastajia ja kaivostyöläisiä ('Fishermen and Miners'). It was said that it "brought to one's mind the field recordings of cultural anthropologists, a breath of air from some mystical past. It had an intriguing atmosphere and at the same time it was aesthetically pleasant." Since then he has released three more EPs and two albums of collaborations as well as three solo albums and three albums with K:H:H:L.

On his first full album, Jos ken pahoin uneksii ('If you have a bad dream'), Käppi "creates a laudable palette of songs. At first, it appears to be a pure folk music album, but that's not what it is. The first song, Mariainen, draws masterfully from the delta blues, and the final song, Vanhan virsikirjan virsi 277 ('Hymn 277 from the old hymnal') brings the listener back to Finnish traditions. During the rest of the songs, he goes through a rich variety of styles, which one would not first associate with a jouhikko player. Käppi's voice, which at times reminds one of that of Tuomari Nurmio, combined with traditional music, brings to one's mind The Incredible String Band. If it is allowed to be psychedelic in folk music, then Käppi is the leading figure in it in our country", wrote Jaan Wessman for the music journal Soundi.

The second album, Vuonna '86 ('In the year '86'), gave rise to the following critique: "It seems that in Tampere there exists some kind of version of the Star Trekian disturbance in the spacetime continuum. A lot of folk music of other dimensions has originated from there during the last few years. The new release by Pekko Käppi, too, draws partially from the same Ugric marsh as did the fine album Jos ken pahoin uneksii (2007), but from a great many other places as well."

The critique of the third album, Rammat Jumalat ('lame gods'), says that "on record or at a gig [Käppi's music] is not only easy to approach but simply irresistible. Rammat jumalat makes it even easier to approach with its stylish band approach, in which Käppi's multitoned jouhikko rock blends with a hypnotic sound frame reminiscent of the ragged blues of Tom Waits and Tuomari Nurmio. The tones of folk music are just one ingredient in his soulful and liberated kind of organic rock. The compositions are by Käppi, and in his lyrics traditional croaking blends with his lyricist's heavy message. The riffs swing and the melodies are catchy, and the songs are exceptionally strong. But in spite of this, the strongest ace of the record is Käppi's voice. He has a sound all of his own, full of touching soul and unpredictable power. His unusual phrasing sounds completely natural. One must look far in the history of Afro-American music to find similarly convincing performers who sing with the voice of a 'sensitive bad guy'. We have never before heard the likes of him in Finland."

== Pekko Käppi & K:H:H:L. ==
Since 2015, Käppi has released three albums with K:H:H:L, in which he was joined by Tommi Laine (guitars) and Nuutti Vapaavuori (bass), along with Jani Auvinen (drums and percussion) for his most recent gigs. The band emerged from the sessions of Rammat Jumalat, "and from the beginning it was clear that the next album would be a band effort.

In the critique of the first album, Sanguis Meus, Mama!, it was said that "Käppi understands the connection between the original Ugric spirit and the blues. There are riffs and rhythmic patterns here into which one could run on the records of Tuareg bands. The rock set up woven so cleverly fits in well with these spells. Laine plays splendidly with his acoustic slide guitar, but at times he also tears up distorted riffs that would gain approval from The Black Keys. The dialogue between the jouhikko and the guitar, with intertwining comments from synthesizers, grows into an ever greater role the more one listens to this record. The rhythm is augmented with great taste with drum machines. But I would venture to say that a skillful drummer would add to the value of this hypnotic and at times funky material. If Käppi's voice is still a little boyish and clean, his texts, aware of traditions, are all the heavier. One can sense a powerful smell of revenge, destitution and death in them." Sanguis Meus, Mama! managed to popularize Käppi voodoo concoction, cooked from folk music and blues, into a nearly perfect fit, suitable even for the radio waves.

The second album, Matilda, did not fare quite as well with the critics as the first one did. "If Sanguis Meus, Mama! leaned quite heavily to pop music, then Matilda did so even more heavily. However, Käppi's newest concoction causes one to wrinkle one's nose at it, as the album is not as good as its predecessor. … But Matilda is still quite a good record. It's only that Sanguis Meus, Mama! is so good that not many artists are able to create anything like it during their whole careers, so it is natural to feel disappointed here. One can safely say even now that Matilda is much better than most Finnish pop records will be this year. Käppi's voodoo pop is on its own orbit."

The third album was likewise reviewed positively. Soundi writes that "Pekko Käppi and his band make interesting music on their third album, and they are still rocking wildly. It feels strongly that the best elements of their previous efforts have now found their rightful places here. The first song, "Ikoni" ('Icon'), with its pop tones, makes one smile, and its mantra-like rhythm makes one's body move to it." Helsingin Sanomat writes that "at the start of the year we have a folk music hit. An incredibly catchy, intriguingly strange five-and-a-half-minute song, which one wants to listen to time and again. This is the song 'Ikoni' from the coming album by Pekko Käppi & K:H:H:L entitled Väärä laulu ('The wrong song')."

The jouhikko playing on the band's lates record has been compared to the guitar sound of Jimmy Page, particularly his use of a bow to play the guitar. Another cited influence is Nirvana's MTV Unplugged in New York whose accordion playing by Krist Novoselić impressed Käppi. Käppi subsequently experimented with new rhythmic approaches following the addition of drummer, percussionist and singer Gilbert Kuppusami, a musician from Mauritius to KHHL. Kuppusami incorporated elements of African rhythm into the band's music. The two musicians have recorder one album together, Credo!. A subsequent album, Oi Dai, Dai! was scheduled to be released on September 2025, with its tittle track released as a single.

== Collaboration with Maria Kalaniemi ==
In 2026, Käppi released the album Tåreportens pärla together with Maria Kalaniemi. It is composed to the words of poem 41 of the Kalevala, but in Swedish. In a review in Helsingin Sanomat the following was said about the album:

The dialogue between Kalaniemi and Käppi's instruments, the mutuality conveyed on the album, is truly a subject of admiration: the whole thing was recorded in Kalaniemi's living room in a single take. While the jouhikko and the accordion often paint with lingering notes, the duo’s vocals give the songs a natural, sometimes even lively, rhythm. The strong personalities of these prominent players are heard throughout, and in a limited space they indeed achieve quite a lot.

== Discography ==
=== EPs ===
- Kalastajia ja kaivostyöläisiä, Amerikan Peikko Records, Kuusi Pientä Kustantajaa, 2001.
- Бубнить Себе под нос, 267 lattajjaa, 2003.
- Minun päiväkunnissani, Imvated, 2004.

=== Solo albums ===
- Jos ken pahoin uneksii, Peippo, 2007.
- Vuonna '86, Singing Knives, 2010.
- Rammat Jumalat, Helmi Levyt, 2013.
- Finnish Folk Songs Vol. 1, Helmi Levyt, 2019.

=== Pekko Käppi & K:H:H:L. ===
- Sanguis Meus, Mama!, GAEA Records, 2015.
- Matilda, Svart Records, 2017.
- Väärä Laulu, Svart Records, 2019.
- Aamunkoi, Svart Records, 2021.
- Credo, Rockadillo Records, 2023.

=== Collaborations ===
- Claypipe, Pekko Käppi, The Blithe Sons: The Amazed Map, Music Fellowship, 2007.
- Petra Hartikainen & Pekko Käppi: Uni Uuhella Ajeli, Uulu Records, 2009.
- Pekko Käppi / Juhana Nyrhinen: Mun paras ystävä, Helmi Levyt, 2012. (EP)
- Maria Kalaniemi & Pekko Käppi: Tåreportens pärla. Åkerö Records, 2026.
