= Dumari & Spuget =

Dumari & Spuget (‘The Judge and the Winos’) is the current and the longest lasting band of Finnish recording artist Tuomari Nurmio.

== General ==
Dumari & Spuget usually performs with the same line up, but in the film Toivon tuolla puolen by Aki Kaurismäki guitar is played by Esa Pulliainen instead of the regular Miikka Paatelainen.

== Line up ==
=== Standard line up ===
- Tuomari Nurmio – vocals, guitar
- Miikka "MacGyver" Paatelainen – guitars, harmonica, backing vocals
- Markku Hillilä – drums, percussion
- Mitja Tuurala – double bass, organ

=== Dumari & Spuget & Blosarit ===
- In addition to the above:
  - Juho Viljanen: trombone, tuba, percussion
  - Janne Toivonen: trumpet
  - Antti Hynninen: saxophone

== Discography ==
- The albums have been credited mainly to Tuomari Nurmio. However, the latest album, Usvaa putkeen, is credited to Dumari & Spuget.

Album	Released	Record label	Chart position (Finland)	Week	Certification	References
Dumari ja Spuget	2013	Ratas / Sony	3.	16/2013	gold disc	
Dumari ja Spuget bailaa	2014	Ratas / Sony	7.	17/2014		
Dumarillumarei	2017	Sony	6.	18/2017; 20/2017		
Usvaa putkeen	2019	Vallila Music House	1.	5/2019		
