= Regina (Finnish band) =

Finnish synth-pop band

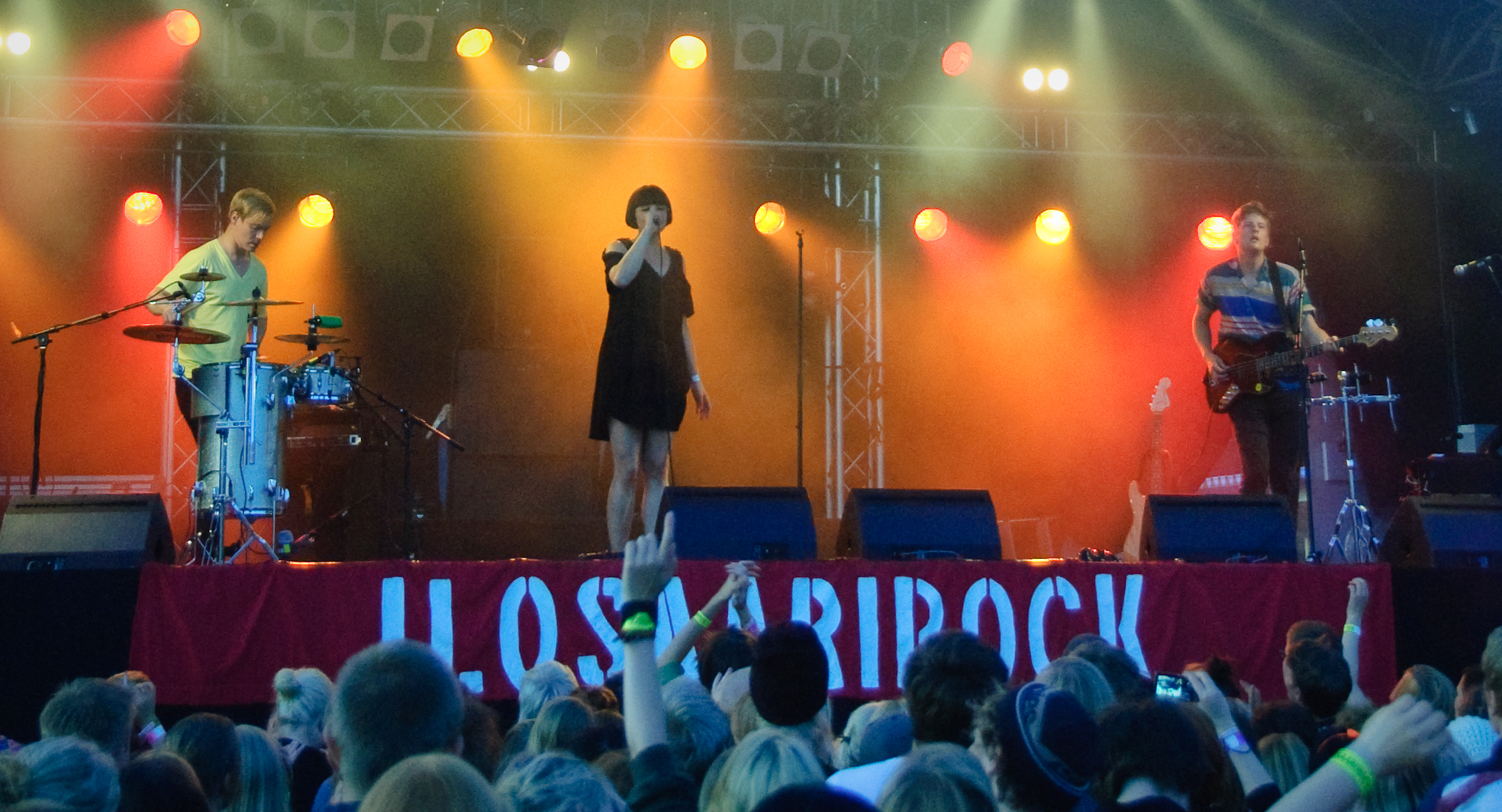

Regina was a Finnish synth-pop band, which was active during 2004–2017.

== History ==
In 2004, then couple Mikko Pykäri and Iisa Pajula uploaded a few tracks to the internet for free. Soon after, they were asked to play live and recruited drummer Mikko Rissasen to the band. The new band signed a record deal with the label Next Big Thing immediately after their first live show.

The group's first album, Katso maisemaa was released in November 2005 to favorable reviews in the Finnish music press. The sophomore album Oi miten suuria voimia! was released in March 2007, reaching #13 on The Official Finnish Charts, and improvement over the debut album, which reached #31.

Regina's third album Puutarhatrilogia was released on February 11, 2009 and reach #6 on the charts. The group's fourth and final album Soita mulle was released in the fall of 2011, with a guitar-heavier sound with nods towards shoegaze. The last two albums and corresponding singles received some acclaim in international music press, with AllMusic and Pitchfork comparing the band to Lykke Li, Stereolab and Cocteau Twins.

Following the divorce of Mikko and Iisa Pykäri in early 2017, the band subsequently disbanded.

== Band members ==
- Iisa Pajula – vocals
- Mikko Pykäri – keyboards and guitar
- Mikko Rissanen – drums and percussion

== Discography ==
=== Albums ===
- Katso maisemaa (2005)
- Oi miten suuria voimia! (2007)
- Puutarhatrilogia (2009)
- Soita mulle (2011)

=== Singles ===
- Olisitko sittenkin halunnut palata (2005)
- Katso maisemaa (2005)
- Minua ollaan vastassa (2006)
- Näinä mustina iltoina (2007) internetissä ja CD-R-versiona (350 kpl) jaettu joululahjasingle
- Saanko jäädä yöksi? (2008) Maxisingle
- Unohtuneesta (2010)
- Jos et sä soita (2011)
- Haluan sinut (2011) – Official song for Helsinki Pride 2011
- Yksi kerta (2014)
