= Astrid Swan =

Finnish musician and singer (born 1982)

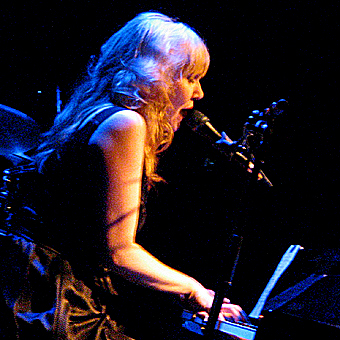
Astrid Swan at Tavastia (Helsinki, Finland), 28 January 2006

Astrid Swan (born Astrid Joutseno, 1982) is a Finnish musician and singer. She records in English. Her album Poverina was released in 2005 in Finland and in 2007 in the U.S. (on Minty Fresh). Singles from the album were "Poverina" and "Good Girl".

She performed an acoustic cover of The Killers "When You Were Young" on KCMP "The Current" in April 2007.

Swan's second album Spartan Picnic was released in Finland by Johanna Kustannus in February 2008. The album has received critical acclaim and entered the Finnish National Top 20 album charts. A new LP 'Better Than Wages' was released in 2009, seeing a more synth-based pop direction.

Swan released another album after she said she had breast cancer in 2014.

In March 2017, Swan released the album From the Bed and Beyond, which tells the story of being diagnosed with aggressive breast cancer. The album was awarded the Teosto Prize. In 2021, the album D/Other was released, which deals with motherhood, dreaming and sleeping firsthand.
