= Noah Kin =

Finnish-Nigerian rapper, DJ and producer

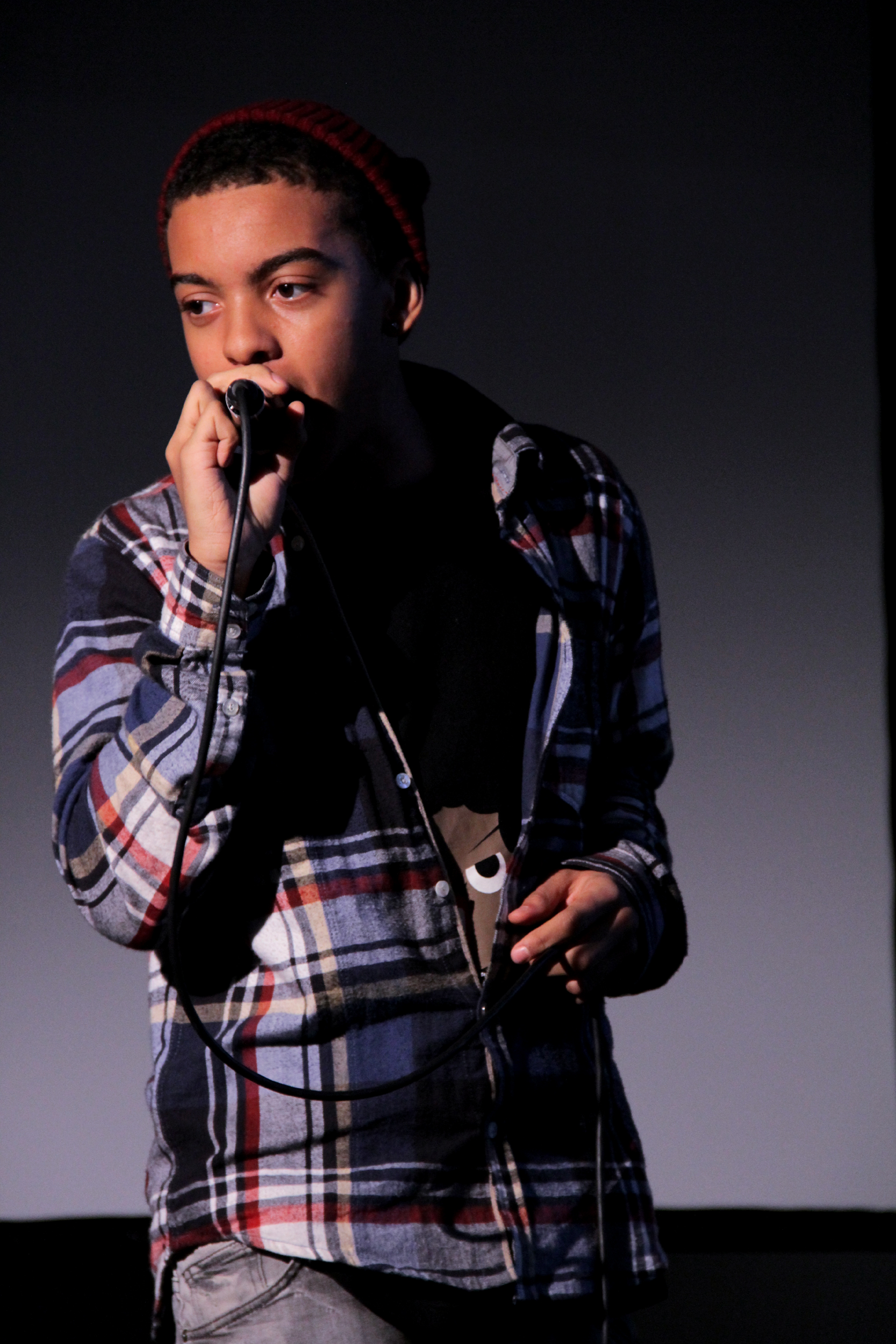
Noah Kin in 2011.

Noah Tuaten Kin (born 1994) is a Finnish rapper, DJ and producer from Helsinki, Finland. Born in Oslo, Norway, he is of Finnish and Nigerian descent. His debut album "No Matter the Season" was released by Helsinki Freedom Records 30. November 2011. From his first album two songs, ”My Name Is Noah Kin” and ”Underground” was released as a bundle music video in September 2011. Noah Kin’s second album 9fngrs was released 27. June 2012. And from this album the song ”the:passion” was released as a music video. His third and latest album ”Now You See” was released 21. March 2014. Noah Kin has studied in Helsinki’s Media Upper Secondary School.

Noah Kin signed with the independent record label Cocoa Music for his third solo album in 2014. The young rapper has opened for Wiz Khalifa, Kendrick Lamar and Earl Sweatshirt and performed alongside the legendary Oakland rap group The Coup in Finland.

Despite his young age he has already performed in the United Kingdom, Germany, Norway, Austria, Switzerland, Estonia and in Eurosonic 2014 - where he got picked as one of the top 5 performers of Eurosonic by Switzerland’s radio SRF Virus.

At the age of eleven, Noah Kin decided to become straight edge after seeing how alcohol and drugs affected the lives of people close to him.

== Personal life ==
Kin was born in Oslo, Norway, to a Finnish mother and a Nigerian father and was raised in Helsinki, Finland, where the family had moved when Kin was nine months old.

== Discography ==
Albums

- No Matter the Season (2011)
- 9fngrs (2012)
- Now You See (2014)

Music videos

- Intro / Underground (2011)
- the:passion (2012)
- 822 (2013)
- You Never Asked (2013)
- Sacred Order of the Pen

Drama film

- Saattokeikka (2017)

=== Guest appearances ===
Artist	Song	Album	Other featuring	Year
The Megaphone State	Beautiful Day	VLA Kings	Gracias & Linda Ilves	2012
M-Dot	Alphabet Soup	Dots on the Map	Ekow & Desco	2012
Don Bigileone	Guardian Angel	By Any Rhymes Necessary	Lucy	2012
Paleface and Matre	Sacred Order of the Pen	Food for the Gods	Psyko Tyko, Eetee, Father Metro, Bentality, Brandon, E. Thelo, Gracias, Jinx, Redrama, Travis Bicle, J.A.K, Mindman & DJ Spinner	2013
Gracias	OD Cumulus	Elengi		2014
Kesken	Booty	1/0		2014
