= VIRTA =

Finnish post-jazz band

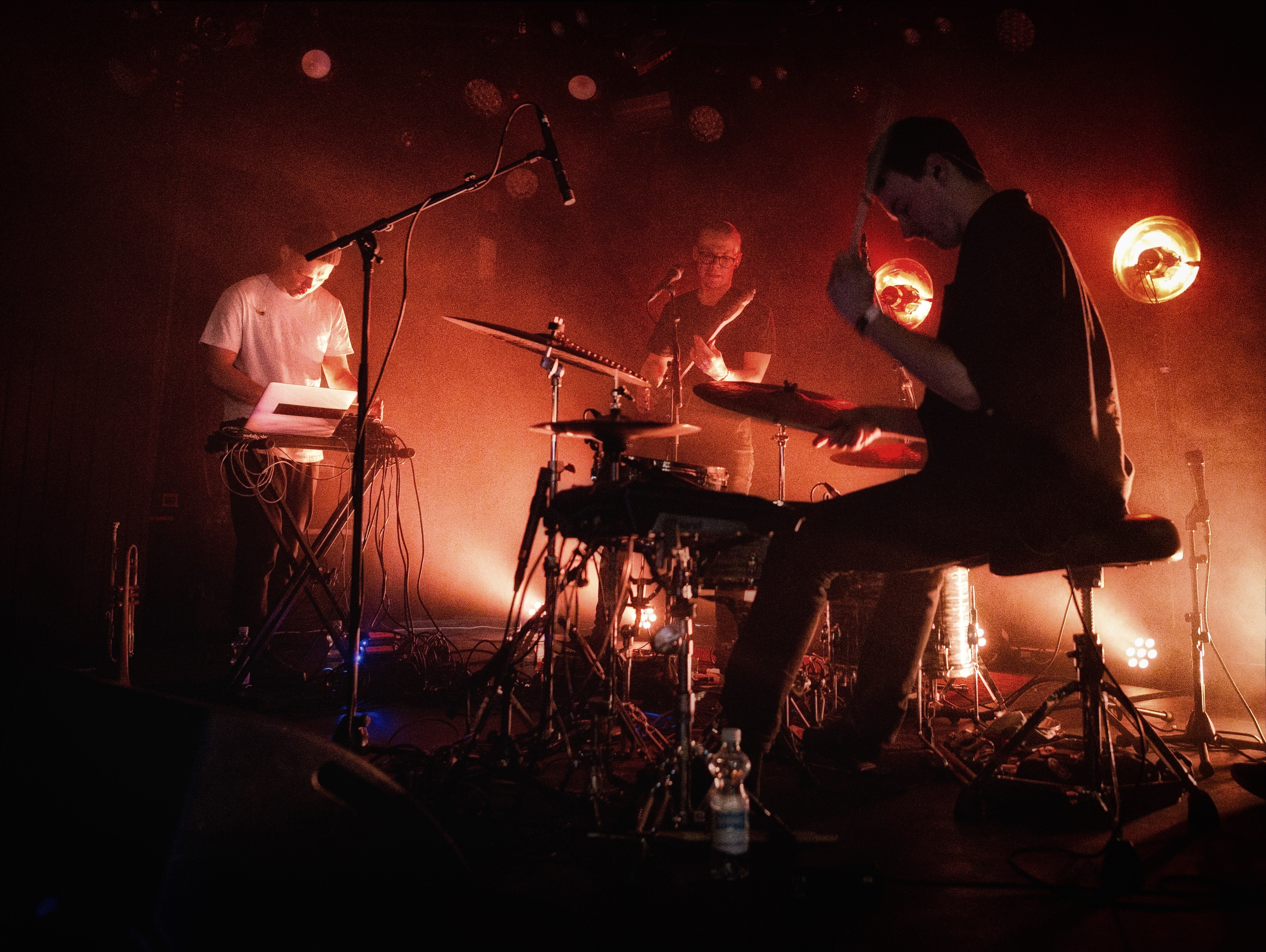
- VIRTA performing at On the Rocks in Helsinki, Finland in May 2018 (Photo by Jari Flinck)

Background information
- Origin: Kuopio, North Savo, Finland
- Genres: Jazz, electronic, experimental, post-rock, ambient, jazz-rock, nu jazz
- Years active: 2011–present
- Labels: Svart
- Members: Erik Heikkinen; Antti Hevosmaa; Heikki Selamo
- Website: virtavirta.com

VIRTA (meaning electricity, energy or a stream) is a Finnish band founded in Kuopio in 2011 by Antti Hevosmaa on trumpet and vocals, Heikki Selamo on guitar and vocals and Erik Fräki on drums and percussion. All of the band members are heavily equipped with electronic effects, samplers and other digital sound processors they use to manipulate the sounds of their instruments. Today the band locates in Helsinki. The group is known for their particular sounds and sights that they create with their instruments, the sound system and live lights when performing live.

The mostly instrumental sound of VIRTA stands somewhere between Nordic jazz, post-rock and modern electronic music.

== Discography ==
- Tales from the Deep Waters (2012, Tourist Information)
- Hurmos (2016, Svart Records)
