= Huoratron =

Finnish electronic music artist

Huoratron (Aku Raski)
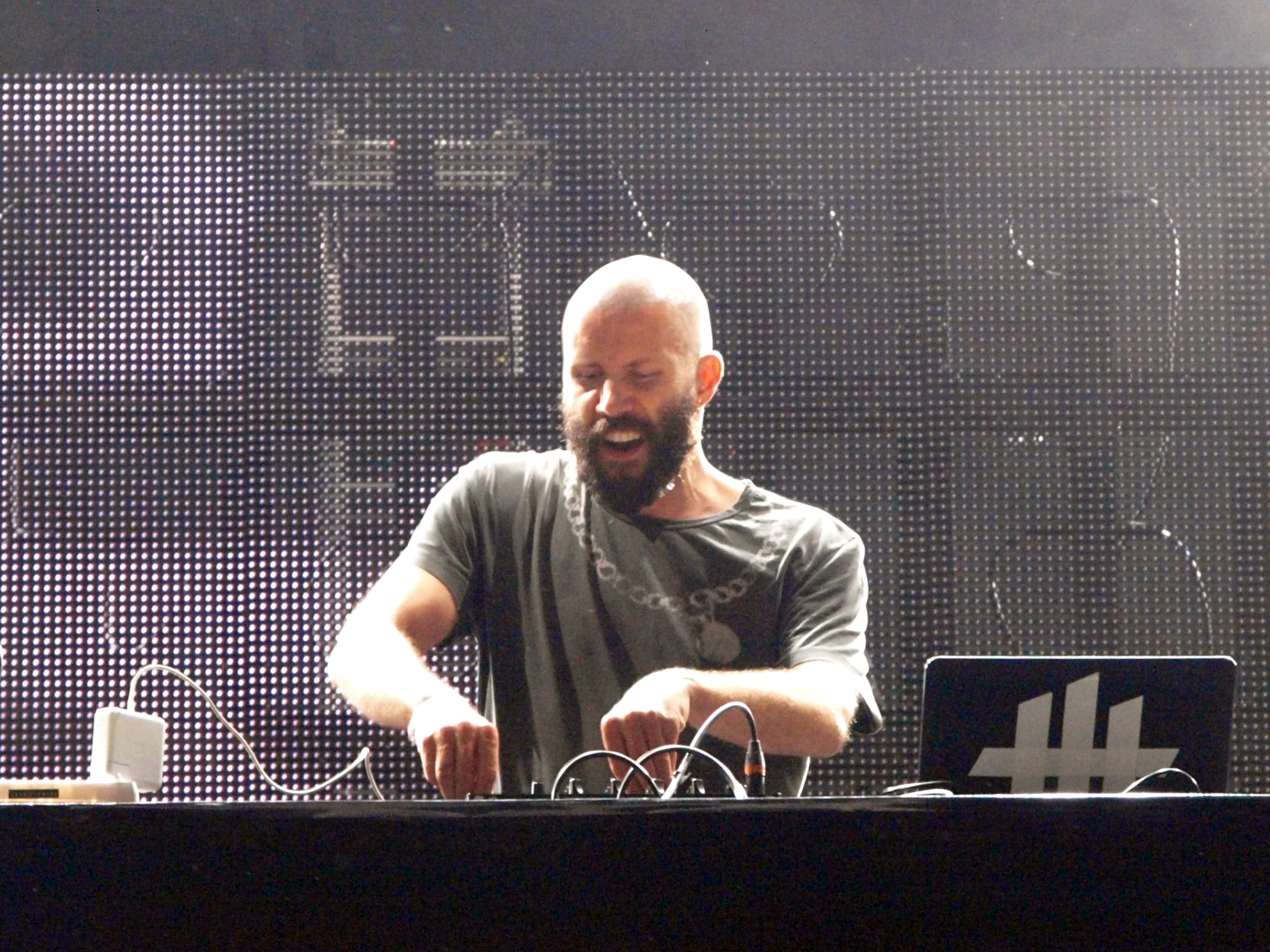
- Huoratron during his show at Provinssirock 2013

Background information
- Origin: Finland
- Genres: Electro house, chiptune
- Years active: 2003–Present
- Labels: New Judas; Last Gang
- Website: www.huoratron.com

Aku Raski, known by his stage name Huoratron, is a Finnish electronic music artist. Active since 2003, he is known for several releases such as "Prevenge", "$$ Troopers", and "Corporate Occult". He has also done a remix of HIM's "In Venere Veritas". In 2010 he signed with Last Gang Records and released his first full-length album entitled "Cryptocracy."

== Discography ==
=== Albums ===
- 2012: Cryptocracy (CD, Last Gang)
- 2017: XXVI Crimes of Love (CD, Last Gang)

=== EPs ===
- 2008: $$ Troopers (12" / CD, New Judas)
- 2009: Corporate Occult (12" / CD, New Judas)

=== Singles ===
- 2008: $$ Troopers (12" single, New Judas)

=== Remix ===
- Mixhell "Highly Explicit"
- Hermanos Inglesos "Take Me Down"
- Teenage Bad Girl "Keep Up With You"
- M.I.A. "Internet Connection"
- HIM "In Venere Veritas"
- Crystal Castles "Sad Eyes"
- Death from Above 1979 "Crystal Ball"
