= RotFront =

German world music band

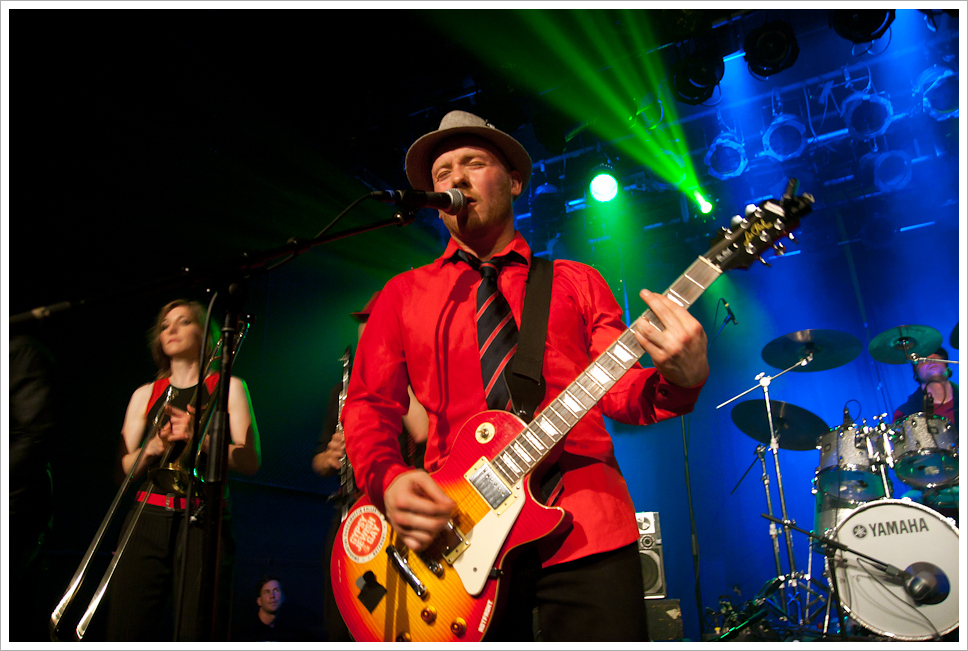
- Rotfront during SO36 concert in 2011.

Background information
- Genres: Reggae, ska, dancehall, klezmer, hip hop
- Years active: 2003–present
- Members: Yuriy Gurzhy; Simon Wahorn; Katya Tasheva; MadMilian; Anke Lucks; Dan Freeman; Max Bakshish; Daniel Kahn; January Penny
- Past members: Dorka Gryllus
- Website: www.rotfront.com

RotFront (often prefixed with: "Emigrantski Raggamuffin Kollektiv") is a world music band from Berlin.

== History ==
The group was founded in 2003 as Emigrantski Raggamuffin Kollektiv RotFront by Ukrainian Yuriy Gurzhy together with Wladimir Kaminer and Hungarian Simon Wahorn.

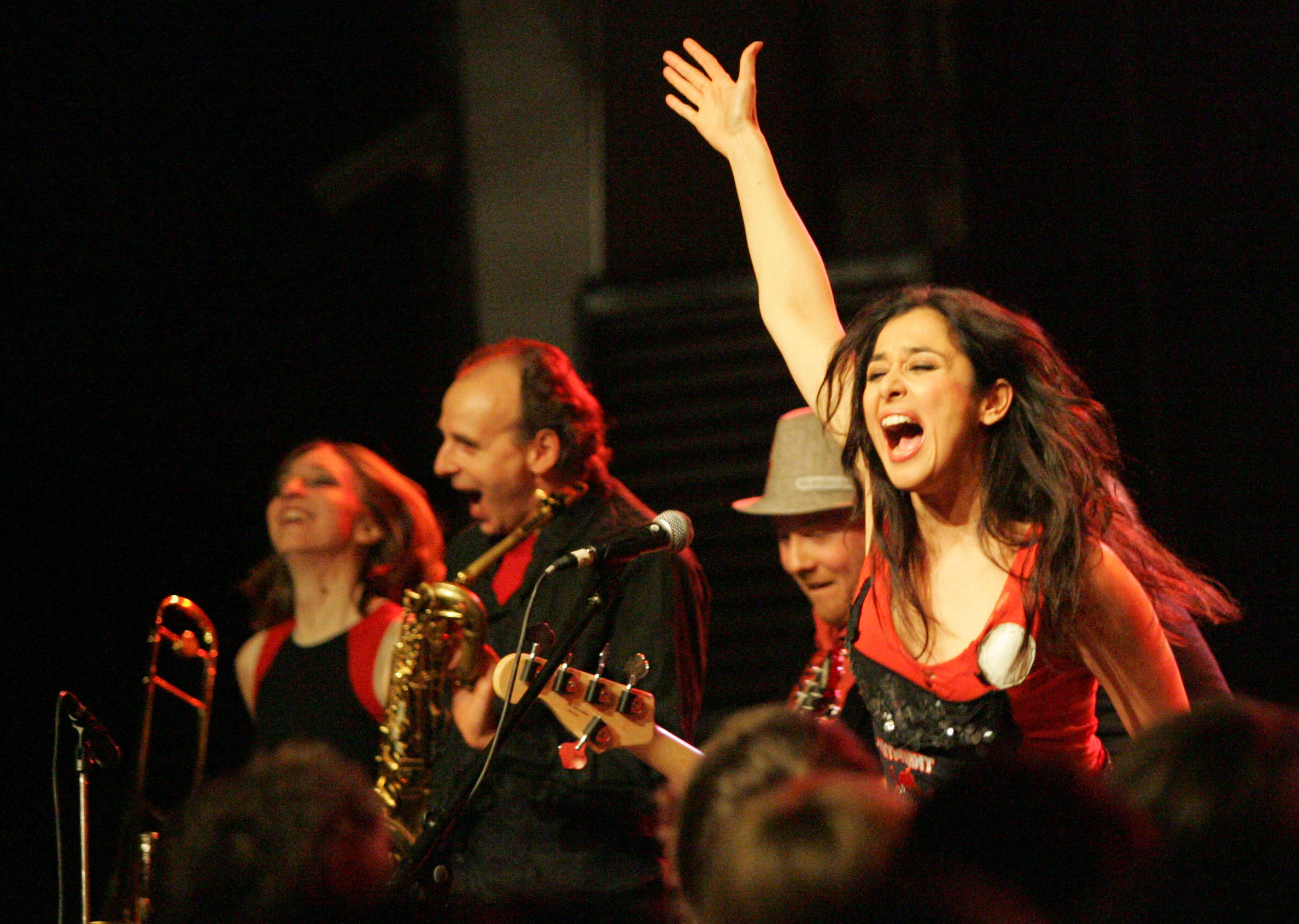
Rotfront (Gryllus at right) performing in Hungary, 2011

Other artists occasionally performed with RotFront. The number of musicians on stage sometimes reached fifteen. Actress and singer Dorka Gryllus is a former band member.

The German World Music Award Ruth was awarded in 2010 to RotFront for their performance at folk music festival TFF Rudolstadt.

== Style and background ==
The band plays in various styles including rock, hip-hop, Dance Hall, reggae, ska and a variety of folk backgrounds.

Song lyrics are written in multiple languages, such as German, English, Russian, Ukrainian and Hungarian.

== Discography ==
=== Albums ===
- Emigrantski Raggamuffin (2009)
- Visa free (May 2011)
- 17 German Dances (17 Deutsche Tänze) (April 2014 )

=== Compilations ===
- B -Style (compilation contribution to listen to berlin (Berlin Music Commission) 2009)
- Ya Piv (Tiger Hifi Echo Mix) (2009)
- Zhenya (P-Town Remix) (Compilation contribution to Kaffee Burger (Duplicate Records) 2006)
