= Litku Klemetti =

Finnish musician (born 1987)

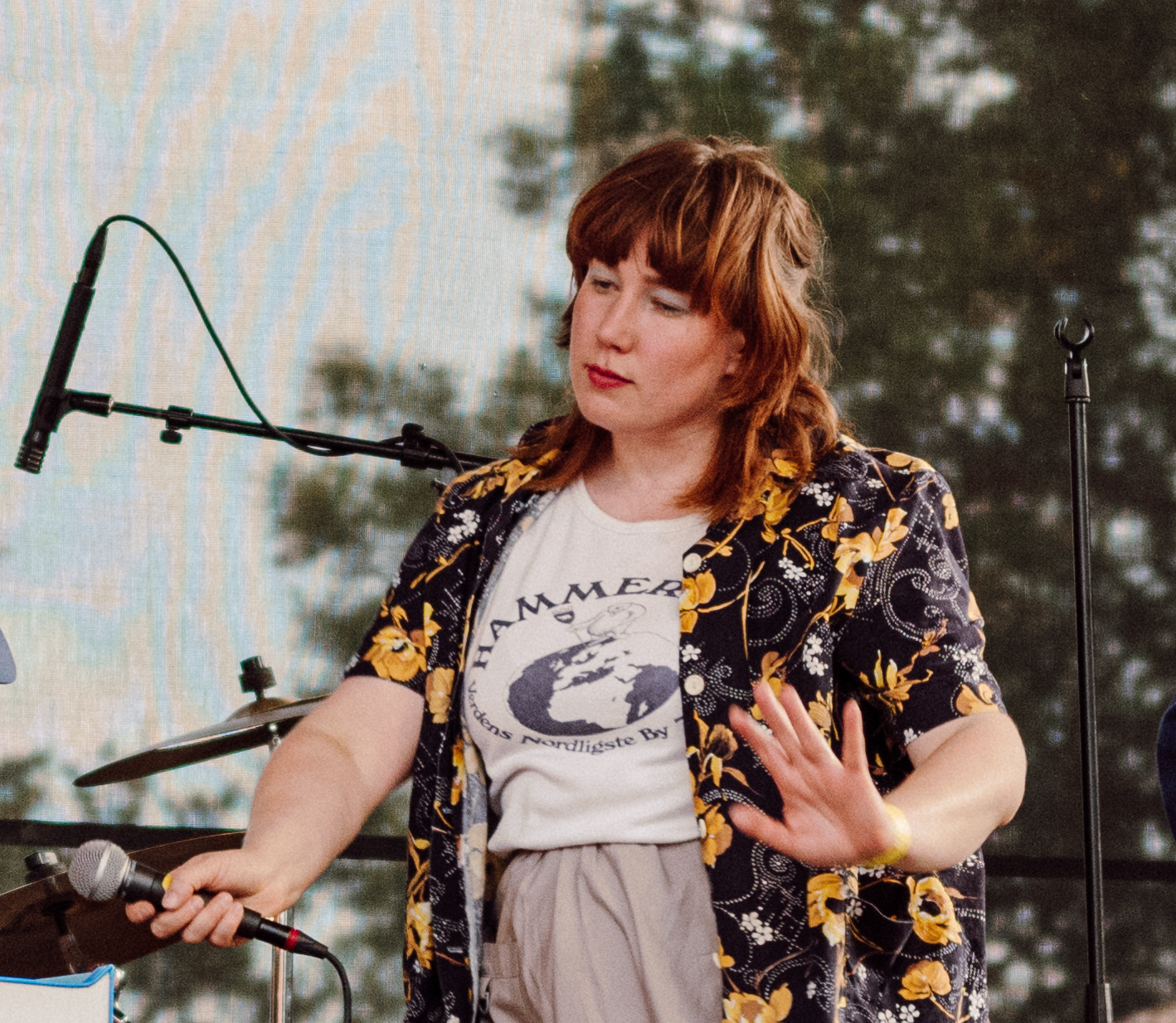
- Litku Klemetti in 2023

Background information
- Also known as: Litku Klemetti
- Born: Sanna Klemetti; 1987 (age 38–39); Kuhmo, Finland

Litku Klemetti (real name Sanna Klemetti, born 1987) is a Finnish musician, singer and songwriter influenced by schlager, punk and progressive rock. She started in the indie scene but gained mainstream popularity.

== Early life and bands ==
Klemetti was born in Kuhmo, in a family she has described as being highly typical. As a young girl, she got in touch with the classic albums of progressive rock in her local library, and later began listening to old Finnish schlager artists from cassette tapes. An especially important record for her was We're Only in It for the Money by the Mothers of Invention. Klemetti felt highly alienated from other young people, as she did not know anybody else who listened to progressive rock. During her school years, she spent some time in psychiatric ward due to her problems.

After gymnasium, Klemetti studied singing in Orivesi. In 2007, she moved to Jyväskylä where her aunt had lived. She studied at Jyväskylä's Music Conservatorium, but felt that the institution was excessively rigid for a creative artist. She switched to the department of music science to the University of Jyväskylä and graduated in 2015. Her master thesis examined Jyväskylä's indie music scene, especially underground station Radio Hear. Her doctoral studies were left incomplete when demand for gigs increased. Klemetti had been in the bands Jesufåglar, Sateenkaarina, Zorse, and Mäsä as a member, but finally in became bandleader in the band Tuntematon Numero. The band's name was later dropped without line-up changes.

== Litku years ==
Whereas in her previous bands, like Jesufåglar and Sateenkaarina, she had written progressive or experimental music, she adopted the stage name Litku (a derogatory word for beverages and other liquids) and started to make deliberately simple music. The impetus for making simple rock music had arisen after seeing the live performance of Räjäyttäjät, a band led by Jukka Nousiainen.

When the band's debut album Horror '15 was released in 2016, the music magazine Soundi named her as the new talent of the year. The album was recorded at a local rehearsal place. The album was more influenced by punk, and featured the autobiographical song "Progetyttö" (prog-rock girl).

Her next album Juna Kainuuseen (2017, "train to Kainuu") led to a commercial breakthrough for the wannabe underground star. The title track received large amounts of radio play and the album received an Emma Award in the Critics' Choice category. Klemetti did not find it easy to deal with the sudden burst of attention, and resulting burnout made her consider stopping her career. While the band's name was dropped afterwards, they released a straightforward rock album Päivä päivältä vähemmän ("Less day by day") on the same year. It included the song "Danny & Kirka" (referring to singers Danny and Kirka) with lyrics being about the fan phenomenon around schlager singers.

Nevertheless, in 2018 Klemetti released the album Taika tapahtuu ("magic happens"). While the Litku character was initially meant to perform simple music, this album occasionally featured slightly more complex song structures, taking stronger influences from progressive rock and Frank Zappa in particular. Famous songs from the album include "Yöt on unta varten" ("nights are for sleeping") and "Miksi en lähtisi kaupunkiin" ("Why wouldn't I go to the city").

The album Ding ding dong was released in the late 2019. The album's lyrical concept follows a fictional character "Hullu Sanna" ("Mad Sanna") which was a name others had called her during her school years. Klemetti has explained that the album's character is what she would have become had she not left her small home town. Stylistically the album is varied, containing more straightforward as well as slightly progressive songs. It has a cleaner sound than its predecessors. Notable songs from the album include "Sinä tiedät sen" (you know it) and "Keijukaisvalssi" ("faery waltz") which has a music video where band members are running in the streets of Kuhmo.

For her 2021 album, Kukkia muovipussissa ("Flowers in plastic bag"), Klemetti switched style to the 1980s disco (notably inspiration being singer Mona Carita after whom one of the singles from the album is named). Thematically the album is related to the lives of teen girls. Featuring electronic percussions and basslines, the album contains output mostly from Klemetti herself and producer-guitarist Pekka Tuomi, giving a break for the rest of the band. Also album's opening track "Tour de France" was released as a single and video. Another video was made for "Google Earth Rock".

Album Asiatonta oleskelua ("Inappropriate staying") marked a return to a rock sound. The album featured slower introspective songs along with brisk rock numbers which at times feature a brass section. The band switched from a smaller indie label to Is This Art! and stopped releasing C-cassettes.

Year's 2024 album Funny Girl (sung in Finnish despite the English title) leaned a little bit more towards pop and synth sounds. Album's biggest hit was Rakastan sun exää ("I love your ex"). Videos were made for two songs: Sumun jälkeen ("After the fog") deals with the themes of war and longing to the utopia and Jos olisin koira ("If I was a dog") is a minor-key reflection about dog's life.

== Artistic vision ==
Klemetti has stated that she composes very fast, often one album in a week. Her aesthetic vision favors jumble sale clothing and lo-fi sound. She states that she does not do "retro" but uses the past as a material to construct new unfashionable things. Her use of the past and abandoned things is done as a counterstatement to the prevailing economic order.

Klemetti plays keyboards and during the early years also electric balalaika. Among the most prominent musicians in her band have been Aleksi Muhonen (guitar), Juho (bass, left in 2021) and Sami Keinänen (drums). Keyboardist Sussu Ketola joined in the autumn 2022.

== Discography ==
=== Albums ===
==== Jesufåglar ====
- Matka ajan rannoille, 2010

==== Zorse ====
- Zorse (EP), 2012

==== Sateenkaarina ====
- Bili Bara Bani Bili (EP), 2015

==== Mäsä ====
- Mä&Sä, 2016
- Viimesen päälle, 2017

==== Litku Klemetti & Tuntematon Numero ====
- Horror '15, 2016
- Päivä päivältä vähemmän, 2017

==== Litku Klemetti ====
- Juna Kainuuseen, 2017
- Taika tapahtuu, 2018
- Ding ding dong, 2019
- Kukkia muovipussissa, 2021
- Asiatonta oleskelua, 2022
- Funny Girl, 2024
