= Villa Nah =

Finnish pop duo

Villa Nah is a Finnish pop duo consisting of Juho Paalosmaa and Tomi Hyyppä. Villa Nah's sound is heavily influenced by 1980's synth-pop. Jori Hulkkonen co-produced the band's debut album Origin and it was released in Finland in March 2010 by Sähkö Recordings's sub label Keys of Life. The album reached number seven on the Official Finnish Album List.

Villa Nah's influences include OMD, Gary Numan, David Bowie, Yellow Magic Orchestra and Kraftwerk.
