= Karri Koira =

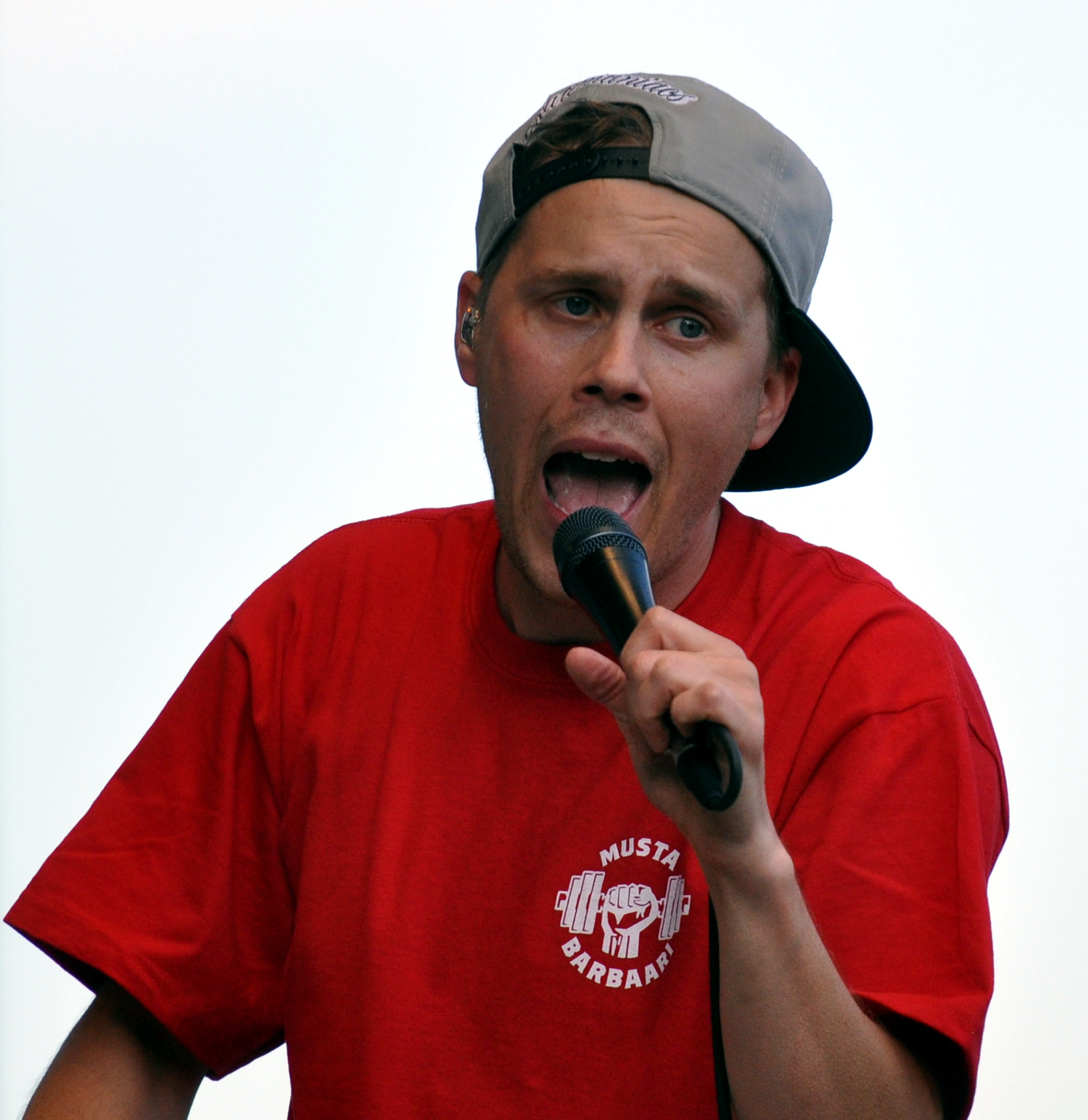
- Karri Koira in 2013

Background information
- Also known as: Karri Dog, Ice Dog, Koira, Sigma
- Born: Karri Timo Mikael Sirén
- Origin: Helsinki, Finland
- Genres: Hip hop; R&B
- Occupations: Rapper; record producer; singer
- Instrument: Vocals
- Label: Monsp Records

Karri Timo Mikael Sirén, professionally known as Karri Koira, is a Finnish rapper, record producer and singer.

== Career beginning ==
Karri Koira rose to fame as a member of the group Vähäiset äänet and gained even wider audience in the summer of 2011 with Ruudolf on the single "Mammat riivaa", a Finnish remake of "Danza Kuduro" by Lucenzo and Don Omar. He has collaborated with several other Finnish rappers as well, such as Kemmuru and JVG. Karri Koira has stated that he draws inspiration from artists such as Ginuwine and D'Angelo. In addition to his musical career, Karri Koira has been doing radio programs for Radio Helsinki since 2005.

== Breakthrough album and critical reception ==
Karri Koira's first solo album K.O.I.R.A., produced by Ruudolf, was released on 30 November 2012. Heini Strand of Rumba gave the album four out of five stars saying that the album is great material for making out, while also noticing that the lyrics are slightly naive at times. Mikko Meriläinen of Soundi was more reserved, giving the album two out of five stars. Although he had enjoyed Karri Koira's previous singles, he found the musically stylish album to be overshadowed by Karri Koira's somewhat limited vocal abilities and awkward phrasing.

== Musical style and commercial reception ==
While the album leans more towards R&B than rap, Karri Koira has said that it is all part of natural evolving, not a chosen decision. K.O.I.R.A. peaked at number six on the Official Finnish Albums Chart. Four singles with accompanying music videos have been released from the album; "Amerikankotka liitää" featuring an appearance by Ruudolf, "Kaikki tai ei mitään", "H-Kaupunki" and "Lähe mun kaa". The fourth single is the first to appear on the Official Finnish Singles Chart, where it debuted at number 14 on 25 January 2013.

== Discography ==
=== Albums ===
- K.O.I.R.A. (2013)

=== With Vähäiset äänet ===
- Vähäiset äänet (2000)
- ...Iso patukka! (2001)
- Paskaacz Däzzä / Menee Pop / Uli Uli (2003)
- Stupid Hop! (2003)

=== Singles and EPs ===
- "Amerikankotka liitää" (2012)
- "Kaikki tai ei mitään" (2012)
- "H-Kaupunki" (2012)
- "Lähe mun kaa" (2012)
- "Suoraan sydämeen" (2023)
- "Istun sun kyytiin" (2023)

=== As a featured artist ===
- "Age a Wage" by Prospect (1999)
- "She Song" by Rudy (2000)
- "Rääväsuu Rekords" by Rudy Rääväsuu (2001)
- "Luckless Lad Add" by Puisto-Osasto (2001)
- "Katkoviiva" by Tono Slono (2002)
- "Ystävyys" by Antti / Werd (2003)
- "Unohtunut live @ pipo silmillä" by Kemmuru (2003)
- "Apostolin kyydissä" by Tonto Slonko (2003)
- "Upea maailma" by Tonto Slonko (2003)
- "Karri Dog Explicit Philosophy" by Rolf Santana (2004)
- "Whottsdadiliyooo" by Ruudolf (2004)
- "Beibe beibe" by Ruudolf (2004)
- "Hala!" by Ruudolf (2004)
- "Kaipaan vaimooni" by Ruudolf (2006)
- "Goodbye Mister White Man" by Kemmuru (2006)
- "Aika lentää" by Christian (2007)
- "Mr. Universum" by Ruudolf (2008)
- "Van Damme" by Ruudolf (2008)
- "Äijillekki sanon" by Ruudolf (2008)
- "Luokkakokous" (2009)
- "Anna sen marinoituu" by Ruudolf (2010)
- "Ihanku ei ois pamahtanu" by Ruudolf (2010)
- "Koira ei itke" by Ruudolf (2010)
- "Maksimoin" by Ruudolf (2010)
- "Leijonakuningas-laulu" by Ruudolf (2010)
- "Raiders" by Jare & VilleGalle (2011)
- "Mammat riivaa" by Ruudolf (2011)
- "Mitä sä siit tiiät (Heeeyyy)" by Jare & VilleGalle (2011)
- "Töttöröö" by JVG (2012)
- "Se on se" by Tantr Slangrr (2013) (As Ice Dawg)
- "Aaltoo" by DeezyDavid (2019)
