= French Films =

Finnish rock band

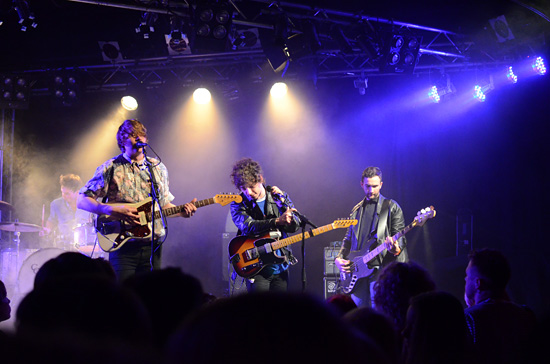
- French Films in 2012.

Background information
- Origin: Helsinki, Finland
- Genres: Indie rock, indie pop, post-punk, jangle pop, new wave, power pop, surf rock, post-punk revival, alternative rock
- Years active: 2010–2017
- Labels: GAEA, Rimeout Recordings, Popfrenzy, Zappruder, Fullsteam
- Past members: Johannes Leppänen; Max Salonen; Tuomas Asanti; Antti Inkiläinen; Mikael Jurmu; Joni Kähkönen; Santtu Vainio

French Films was a Finnish rock band formed in 2010. After being signed to the Finnish label GAEA Booking & Records in fall of 2010, they released their first EP Golden Sea, which was followed by their debut album Imaginary Future in fall of 2011. The band released their second album White Orchid in April 2013.

== History ==
The band's original line-up featured Johannes Leppänen (guitar, vocals), Joni Kähkönen (guitar, vocals), Mikael Jurmu (bass, vocals), Santtu Vainio (synth, vocals) and Antti Inkiläinen (drums), who formed the band in February 2010. Inkiläinen and Leppänen had previously been working together in a band, and they often played shows with Jurmu's band "Yes Please!". After growing accustomed to each other, they decided to start their own group. Leppänen later met Kähkönen in a local pub, who introduced him to Vainio. In October 2012 the band announced that Mikael had left the band and was replaced by Tuomas Asanti as the new bass player. Joni was replaced by Max Salonen in the beginning of 2014.

The name of the band was chosen when Kähkönen was speaking to Leppänen about a French foreign film he had just seen.

Since 2010 the band has been touring all over Europe, and also played shows in Japan, China and United States. Their first performance outside of Finland was in Skopje, Macedonia in the summer of 2010. French Films has been performing at some of the big European festivals like Roskilde Festival, Hultsfred Festival and Flow Festival. In July 2013 the band opened for Muse at their concert in the Helsinki Olympic Stadium.

French Films is a winner of the 2013 European Border Breakers Awards. The European Border Breakers Awards honour the best new music acts in Europe. The award ceremony took place at the Eurosonic Noorderslag music festival in Groningen (NL) in January 2013.

== Imaginary Future (2011) ==
French Films released their debut album, Imaginary Future in September 2011. The album received positive reviews throughout the world, though it was mostly noted by the independent music media. Imaginary Future also won a European Border Breakers Award in the beginning of 2013. The band itself is quoted as saying "We think it's a good combination of roughness of punk and the softness of dream pop".

== White Orchid (2013) ==
In early 2013 it was announced that French Films' second album called White Orchid will come out April/May 2013 in Europe and Asia. Like the debut album Imaginary Future also White Orchid was produced by the band itself and released by GAEA Records. The first single from the 10 track album called "Latter Days" was released 8 February 2013 as a digital release.

== Discography ==
=== Studio albums ===
- Imaginary Future (September 2011, GAEA / Rimeout / Zappruder)
- White Orchid (April 2013, GAEA / Rimeout / Popfrenzy / Odyssey)

=== EPs ===
- Golden Sea (October 2010, GAEA)

=== Other ===
- When People Like You Filled The Heavens 7" (2012, GAEA)
- You Are the Sun (2015)
- Think It Over / Telephone 7" (2016, Fullsteam Records)
