= Ville Leinonen =

Finnish singer-songwriter

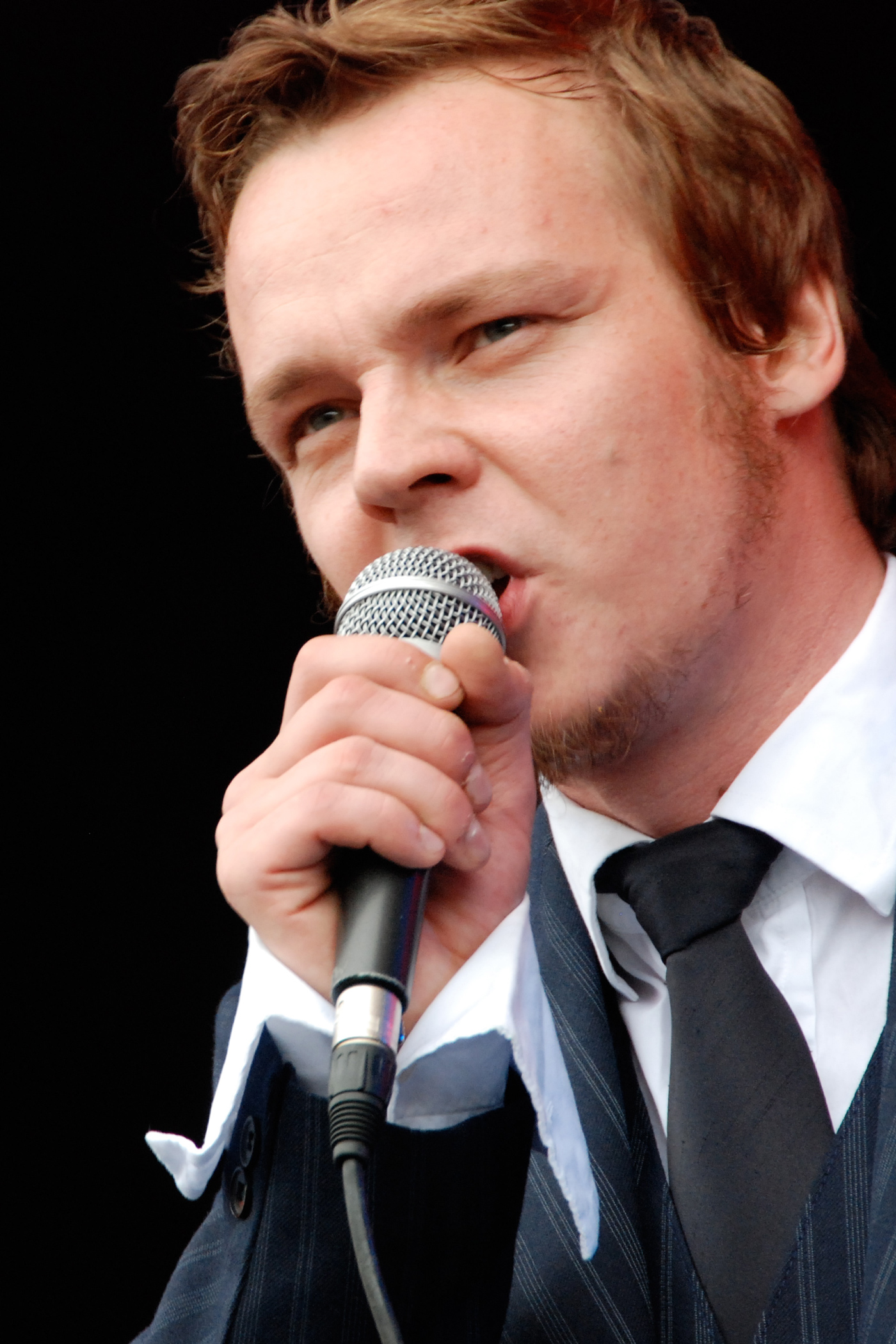
Ville Leinonen, noted singer-songwriter

Ville Leinonen (born 14 October 1975 in Savonlinna) is a Finnish singer-songwriter.

His music combines "bohemian folk (Donovan comes to mind), bossa nova, and imaginary exoticism (George Harrison’s India, Ennio Morricone’s wild west)". Except solo works he took part in recordings of other artists and bands, such as following Fonal Records acts: Islaja, Paavoharju and Es. He was the drummer in the band Office Building from 1999 to 2003 and in the band Risto from 2005 to 2008.

== Discography ==
=== Studio albums ===
- Raastinlauluja (1997) (re-release 2002)
- Ville Leinonen & Valumo (2000)
- Kimaltavia unelmia (2001)
- Taikayön tiellä – live (2001)
- Uuden aamun lauluja (2003)
- Suudelmitar (2004)
- Valloittaja (2005)
- Alive II -live (2006)
- Jalokivikokoelma 1999–2006 (2006)
- Hei! (2007)
- Ville Leinosen Unilehto (2008)
- Majakanvartijan uni (2010)
- Auringonsäde/Pommisuoja (2011)
- Aaukeaaukeaaukeaa (2012)
- Camp Crystal Lake (2012)
- Death Black Dream (2014)
- ISI (2015)
- Mopo & Ville Leinonen: Laivalla (2016)
- Hei taas (2017)
- SURF'S UP! (2025)
