= Tulikoira =

Studio album by Circle
- Released: 2005
- Length: 52:06
- Label: Ektro Records

Circle chronology
Mountain (2004)	Tulikoira (2005)	General (2005)

Tulikoira is the nineteenth album recorded by the Finnish experimental rock band Circle. Released on CD in 2005 by Ektro Records, the album has the band incorporating elements of both drone music and black metal into the krautrock sound of previous albums like Prospekt. Proclaiming themselves the "New Wave of Finnish Heavy Metal", in honour of the new wave of British heavy metal movement, Circle here made explicit their long-held love of 1970s and 1980s heavy metal music. A re-release by Headspin Records in 2007 has a bonus 7" containing material from the band's Earthworm EP recorded with the American singer Bruce Duff. Both songs were re-released on the 2008 album Hollywood which also has Duff on vocals.

== Track listing ==
No.	Title	Length
1.	"Rautakäärme"	7:05
2.	"Tulilintu"	3:50
3.	"Berserk"	8:03
4.	"Puutiikeri"	24:13
5.	"Earthworm"	5:12
6.	"Connection"	3:43

== Personnel ==
- Mika Rättö - vocals, keyboards
- Tomi Leppänen - drums
- Janne Westerlund - guitars
- Jussi Lehtisalo - bass guitar
- Janne Tuomi - percussion
- Tuomas Laurila - tapes
- Jani Viitanen - special guitar
