= Taantumus =

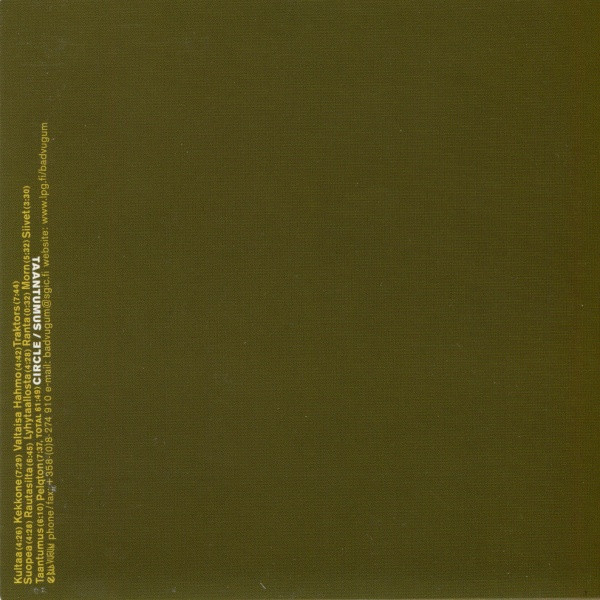

Studio album by Circle
- Released: 2001 (re-released in 2009)
- Recorded: 1999–2000
- Length: 71:09
- Label: Bad Vugum, Ektro Records
- Producer: Taidemietaa and A. Hevipötkö

Circle chronology
Prospekt (2000)	Taantumus (2001)	Raunio (2001)

Taantumus is the tenth album by the Finnish experimental rock band Circle.

First released on CD in 2001 by Bad Vugum, it was re-released by Ektro Records in 2009 with an extra track. According to The Quietus, Taantumus (along with Andexelt and Prospekt), helped bring the band to wider international audiences.

== Track listing ==
1. "Kultaa" (4:27)
2. "Kekkone" (5:31)
3. "Valtaisa Hahmo" (4:44)
4. "Traktors" (7:47)
5. "Suopea" (4:33)
6. "Rautasilta" (6:42)
7. "Lyhytaallosta" (4:28)
8. "Ranta" (0:35)
9. "Morn" (5:32)
10. "Siivet" (3.34)
11. "Taantumus" (6:14)
12. "Pelqton" (7:37)
13. "Veitsi" (9:21) (Bonus track on 2009 re-issue)

== Personnel ==
- Teemu Elo
- Pike Kontkanen - violin on "Kekkone" and "Traktors"
- Jyrki Laiho
- Jussi Lehtisalo - bass guitar, guitar
- Tomi Leppänen - percussion
- Teemu Niemelä
- Janne Peltomäki
- Mika Rättö - keyboards on "Valtaisa hahmo", "Siivet" and "Pelqton"
- Markku Peltola - harmonica on "Morn"
- Mika Rintala - signal processing on "Kekkone" and "Rautasilta"
- Heidi Viljanen - vocals on "Suopea"
- Aki Peltonen - guitar on "Kultaa"
- Tapani Varis - flute on "Valtaisa hahmo"
