= Pharaoh Overlord 3 =

Pharaoh Overlord #3

Studio album by Pharaoh Overlord
- Released: 2004
- Length: 61:21
- Label: Riot Season
- Producer: Jussi Lehtisalo

Pharaoh Overlord chronology
The Battle Of The Axehammer (Live) (2004)	Pharaoh Overlord #3 (2004)	Pharaoh Overlord #4 (2005)

Pharaoh Overlord #3 is the fourth album by Finnish experimental rock band Pharaoh Overlord.

It follows closely the pattern developed on Pharaoh Overlord #2 of quieter, more reflective tracks, whilst maintaining the krautrock-influenced hypnotic repetition common to all the band's releases up to this point. A notable exception to this was the track Autobahn, ten minutes of buzzing guitar feedback drone which points towards the more abstract sounds of 2010's Siluurikaudella. Octagon, meanwhile, is the first Pharaoh Overlord track to feature vocals.

== Track listing ==
1. Test Flight (9:52)
2. Blackout (4:45)
3. Laivaus 17 (13:13)
4. Autobahn (9:59)
5. Octagon (13:34)
6. Journey (9:56)

== Personnel ==
- Jussi Lehtisalo
- Tomi Leppänen
- Janne Westerlund
- Aki Peltonen
