= Alotus =

Studio album by Circle
- Released: 2002
- Length: 47:11
- Label: Klangbad
- Producer: Hans Joachim Irmler

Circle chronology
Sunrise (2002)	Alotus (2002)	Guillotine (2003)

Alotus is the thirteenth album by the Finnish experimental rock band Circle.

The album cemented Circle's relationship with Hans Joachim Irmler, a founder member of the krautrock band Faust. The CD was released on Irmler's label Klangbad, and Irmler is credited as producer and co-arranger. In concerts around the time, the vocalist Mika Rättö often wore a T-shirt with the cover art from Faust's eponymous first album. "Northern Sky" was also included on the 2002 compilation album Klangbad First Steps.

Although current members Tomi Leppänen and Janne Westerlund are not credited as playing on the album, they do appear in the band photograph in the sleevenotes.

== Track listing ==
1. Työläisten laulu (11:45)
2. Alotus (11:26)
3. Northern Sky (2:37)
4. Lopetus (11:10)
5. Potto (10:12)

== Personnel ==
- Teemu Elo
- Jyrki Laiho
- Jussi Lehtisalo
- Janne Peltomäki
- Mika Rättö
