= Kollekt =

Compilation album by Circle
- Released: 1998
- Label: Bad Vugum

Circle chronology
Pori (1998)	Kollekt (1998)	Surface with Marble Sheep (1998)

Professional ratings
Review scores
Source	Rating
AllMusic	3/5 stars

Kollekt is the sixth album by the Finnish experimental rock band Circle, led by bass guitarist Jussi Lehtisalo. It was released in 1998 by Bad Vugum. It collects the band's early singles, and previously unreleased songs from sessions for their first album, Meronia.

== Track listing ==
1. Point (2:53)
2. Fone (2:46)
3. Depoint (4:28)
4. Crawatt (3:55)
5. Circus (1:13)
6. Silver (3:03)
7. Polka (1:46)
8. Ed-Visio (4:21)
9. Armond (3:17)
10. Hypto (8:32)
11. Superb (2:54)
12. Aspirites (5:46)
13. DNA (3:32)
14. Independence (3:53)
