= Hissi =

Hissi may refer to:

- Hissi (album), a 1996 album by Circle
- Hissi, Selu, a village in Parbhani district, Maharashtra, India
