= Raunio =

Live album by Circle
- Released: 2001/2002
- Recorded: 8, 9 and 10 November 2001
- Length: 1:10:42
- Labels: Ektro Records, Squealer Records
- Producer: t-mu

Circle chronology
Taantumus (2001)	Raunio (2001)	Sunrise (2002)

Raunio is the eleventh album by the Finnish experimental rock band Circle.

The album is a mixed and re-arranged ("manipulated") composite of three live shows on consecutive nights in Turku, Jyväskylä and Helsinki. It was re-issued in 2002 by Squealer Records with an extra track, "Raubonmix". A review in Pitchfork called it "a decent album for any newcomer to Circle's work". Alex Henderson, writing for AllMusic, commented on the two different types of music on the album, "Parts of Raunio...are calm, reflective, and mindful of European chanting and spiritual traditions. Other times, however, the Finnish band rocks aggressively, turns up the amps, and engages in some very tripped-out, free-spirited jamming".

== Track listing ==
1. "Raunio I" – 6:56
2. "Alotus" – 7:58
3. "Raunio II" – 2:46
4. "Kultaa" – 5:18
5. "Raunio III" – 1:08
6. "Lokki" – 10:59
7. "Dedofiktion" – 7:00
8. "Potto" – 13:17
9. "Raunio IV" – 3:24
10. "Raubonmix" – 11:59

== Personnel ==
- Olli Joukio
- Janne Westerlund
- Mika Rättö
- Jyrki Laiho
- Jussi Lehtisalo
