= All Them Witches =

American rock band from Nashville

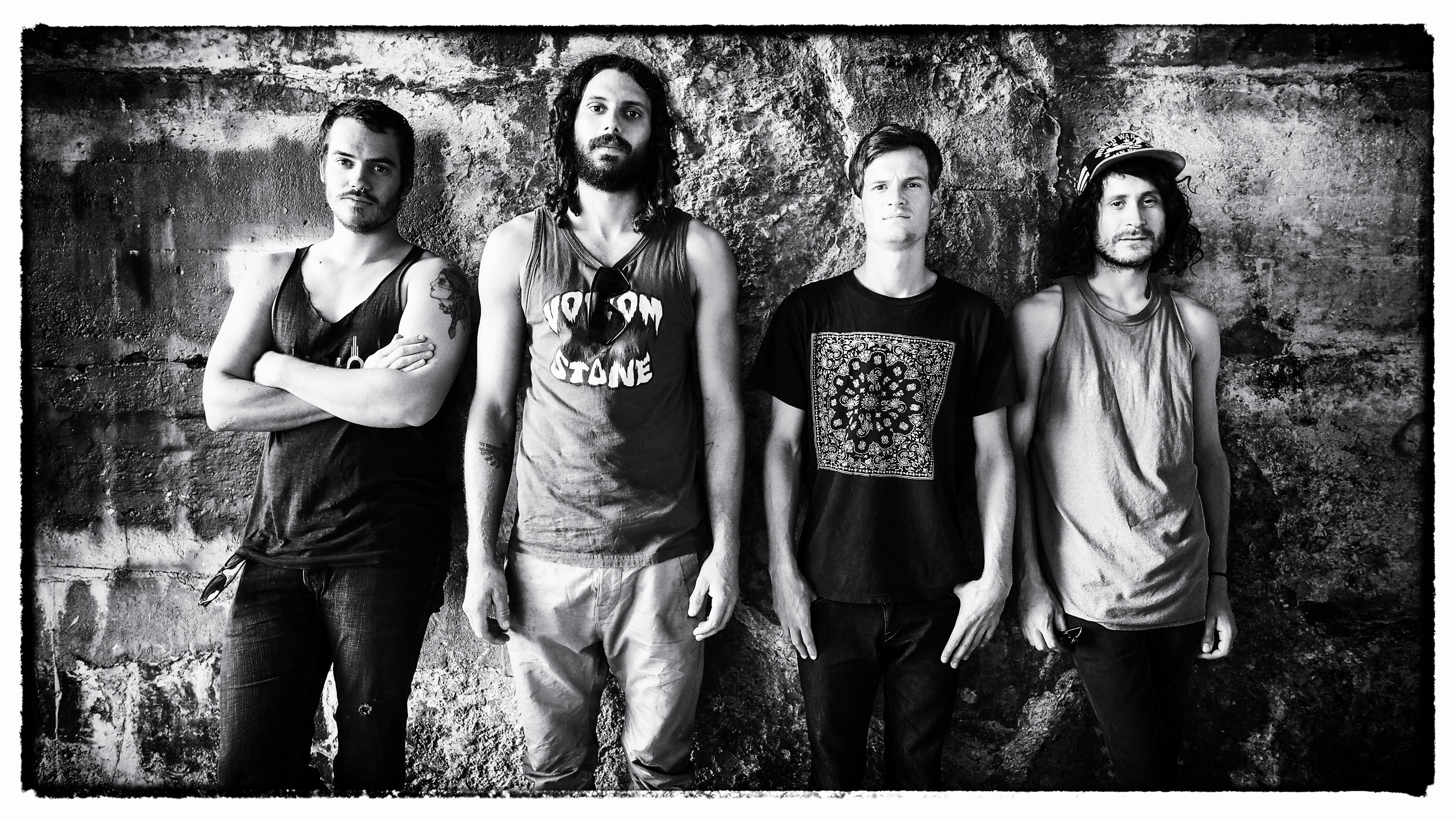

Background information
- Origin: Nashville, Tennessee, U.S.
- Genres: Blues rock; hard rock; stoner rock; acid rock; neo-psychedelia; heavy metal; alternative rock
- Years active: 2012–present
- Labels: Elektrohasch; New West
- Members: Charles Michael Parks Jr.; Ben McLeod; Allan Van Cleave; Christian Powers
- Past members: Jonathan Draper; Robby Staebler
- Website: allthemwitches.org

All Them Witches is an American rock band from Nashville, Tennessee. The band consists of vocalist/multi-instrumentalist Charles Michael Parks Jr., guitarist Ben McLeod and keyboardist/multi-instrumentalist Allan Van Cleave.

== History ==
=== Formation and early years (2012–2015) ===
All Them Witches formed on January 6, 2012. Drummer Robby Staebler, having lost all of his money, had recently sold many of his possessions, moved to Nashville from Portland, Oregon, and was living in his car. The reason he had moved was to play in an acquaintance's band; however, he left the project after finding the other party to be difficult as a collaborator. Staebler had created a rough collection of eight tracks on which he played all of the instruments and being "in love with the sound," was looking for musicians to record the music as a band.

Staebler recruited guitarist Ben McLeod after seeing him playing slide guitar at a bar. The pair originally attempted to create jazz music, but abandoned this in favor of a heavier sound. This was followed several months later by Staebler meeting frontman and bassist Charles Michael Parks Jr. while they were both working for "a corporate hippie store." Parks was shown a collection of demo songs created by Staebler and McLeod, which persuaded him to join.

The band's name is taken from a book of witchcraft, All of Them Witches, featured in the 1968 film Rosemary's Baby.

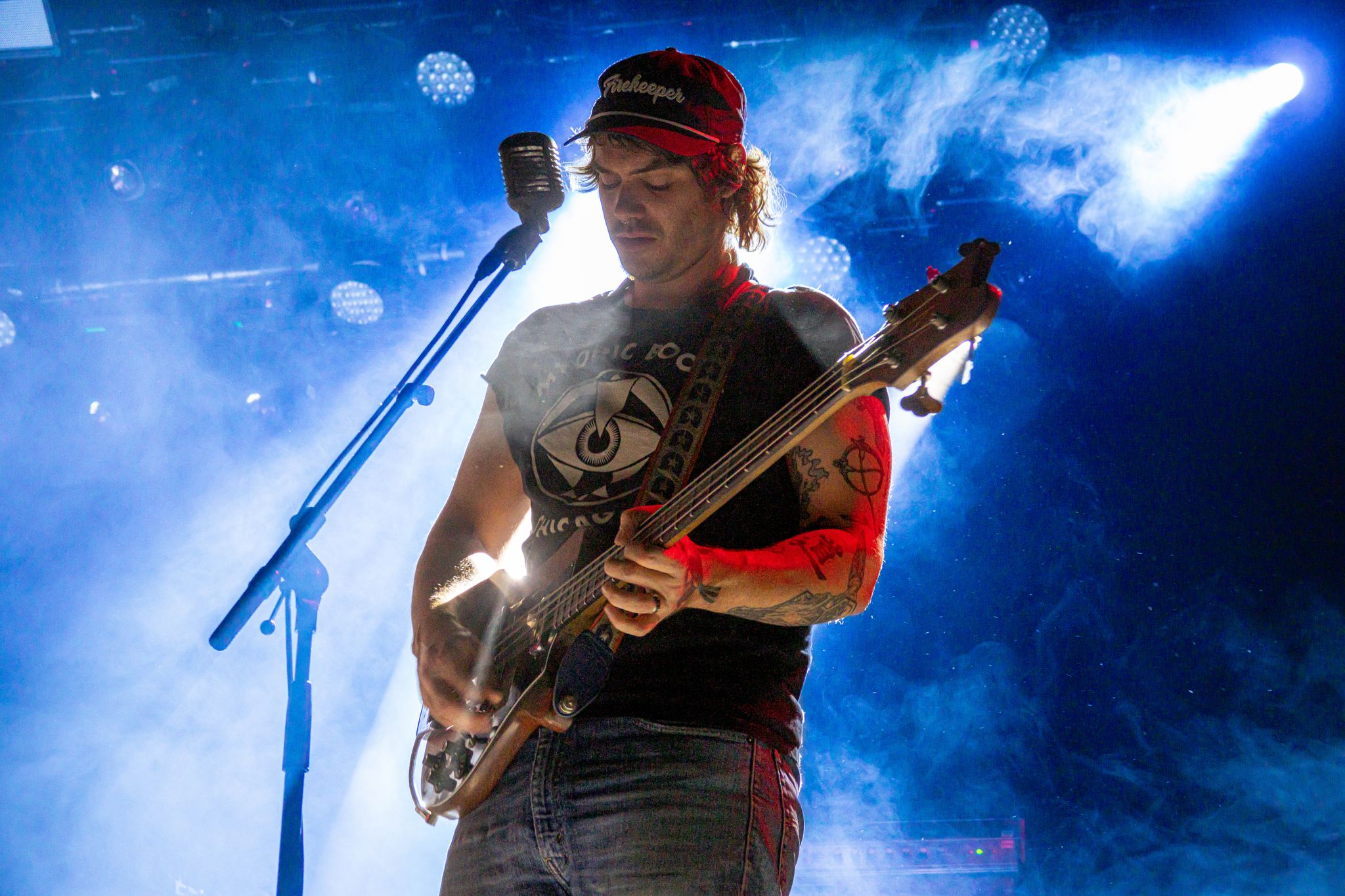
Charles Parks with All Them Witches in Madrid (2025)

The band self-released their first, self-titled four-track EP in the same year as their formation. They then became the first American band to be signed to the German heavy psych record label Elektrohasch Schallplatten. Their debut album, Our Mother Electricity (which had previously been self-released by the band in summer 2012), was released on Elektrohasch with new mastering and artwork (by Mat Bethancourt) in February 2013. Soon after came their second EP, Extra Pleasant, which was recorded with two microphones directly to a four-track cassette tape recorder.

In 2013, the band's second studio album, Lightning at the Door, was self-released via their own Bandcamp page; it was later marketed by Tone Tree Music. Their next self-released album was the official live album At The Garage in February 2015.

=== New West Records (2015) ===
In summer 2015, the band signed to New West Records. Later in the year, they released their third studio album (and their first with New West), Dying Surfer Meets His Maker, which was recorded in six days in a remote mountainside cabin, overlooking Pigeon Forge, Tennessee. The album's name was originally used by McLeod for a song in his solo project, Woodsplitter, inspired by a real-life incident where he almost died when surfing.

The band's previously self-released album, Lightning at the Door, was then re-released by New West in 2016. This was followed first by Live in Brussels, recorded live in Brussels, Belgium, in March 2016 and released in September 2016; then by the band's fourth studio album, Sleeping Through the War, in February 2017. Sleeping Through the War was produced by Nashville's Dave Cobb, who had worked previously with artists such as Sturgill Simpson and Chris Stapleton. The album featured guest vocals from three Nashville-based female vocalists, Caitlin Rose, Erin Rae, and Tristen, in addition to harmonica contributions from Mickey Raphael.

=== ATW and departure of Van Cleave (2018) ===
In mid-2018, it was announced that Jonathan Draper was replacing Allan Van Cleave on keyboards. In an interview at Download Festival 2018, Parks and Staebler made clear that the change was permanent, and that Van Cleave had left the band. Their next album, ATW, was released in September of that year; however, the following month, Parks announced that the band would be continuing as a three-piece, without Draper. ATW was produced by the band's guitarist, Ben McLeod, and mixed by producer Rob Schnapf, featuring a more simplified, naturalistic sound than their previous albums.

The band's first music as a three-piece was the non-album single "1X1," which was released on Halloween 2019. This was followed by their sixth studio album, Nothing as the Ideal, in September 2020. The album was recorded at Abbey Road Studios in Studio Two and produced by Mikey Allred, who had also produced their earlier album, Dying Surfer Meets His Maker. In mid-August, shortly before the album's release, a video was released for the track "The Children of Coyote Woman". The video was directed by Staebler and starred himself alongside professional skateboarder Evan Smith. Metal Hammer named Nothing as the Ideal as the 46th best metal album of 2020.

=== Return of Van Cleave, Baker's Dozen (2021–2022) ===
In April 2021, the band announced via Facebook and Twitter that Van Cleave had rejoined the band as its keyboard player. Their first new release following Van Cleave's return was a cover of "Black Snake" by John Lee Hooker in January 2022. When announcing this new track, the band confirmed that it would be the first of a "Baker's Dozen" of tracks, which would be released on a monthly basis throughout 2022, along with one extra, for a total of 13. In March 2022, the band released digital audio and CD versions of their Live on the Internet livestream show, which had originally been broadcast in 2020 and made available on vinyl for Record Store Day in 2021.

=== Departure of Robby Staebler (2024) ===
In April 2024, drummer and founding member Robby Staebler announced his departure from the group to focus on other projects.Band friend Christian Powers quickly filled in for the upcoming tour, later becoming the new drummer.

=== House of Mirrors (2026) ===
In July 2025, the House of Mirrors tour began, with the band debuting most of the album. The tour extended into 2026. On March 13, 2026, House of Mirrors was announced to be the next studio album of the band, releasing on May 29th. This is the first studio effort with Christian Powers on drums.

== Musical style and influences ==
The band's musical style incorporates elements from multiple genres, such as hard rock, stoner rock, psychedelia, neo-psychedelia, blues, folk, and Southern rock. However, Julian Marszalek of The Quietus noted that:

...this isn't blues of the "woke-up-this-morning" variety but one of malaise, anxiety and fear brought on a by [sic] world seemingly dead set on destruction; nor is this an escapist variant of psychedelia wherein one form of reality is jettisoned in favour of another for reasons of cheap thrills.

Nick Pipitone of Monster Riff described how the band are "influenced just as much by Dr. John and Mississippi bluesman Junior Kimbrough as they are by Black Sabbath and progressive metal" and that their music can "venture from bluesy riffs and folk tales to spacey neo-psychedelic to punishing doom rock." Similarly, Rob Hughes of Classic Rock Magazine noted how "[All Them Witches are] as likely to create boiling riptides of bluesy psychedelia as they are pools of mystic folk and doomy ambience."

Vocalist and bassist Charles Michael Parks Jr., who is also the band's lyricist, has described international folk music as one of his biggest influences, and cited Pink Floyd, Grateful Dead, the Allman Brothers, early Fleetwood Mac, and Roy Buchanan as artists of which all band members are fans. Guitarist Ben McLeod additionally cites Jerry Garcia and the Doors as significant influences, beginning in his childhood. Drummer Robby Stabler cites Pink Floyd, Led Zeppelin, Miles Davis, Sun Ra, Santana, Neil Young, and Nick Drake.

All Them Witches are commonly compared with Black Sabbath; however, Parks has described this as misleading, because none of the band members listen to Sabbath. Other groups against which the band have been compared include Kyuss, Blue Cheer, Tool, Queens of the Stone Age, Pink Floyd, and Led Zeppelin.

== Band members ==
=== Current members ===
- Charles Michael Parks Jr. – lead vocals, bass, guitar, keyboards, percussion (2012–present)
- Ben McLeod – guitar, keyboards, bass, percussion, backing vocals (2012–present)
- Allan Van Cleave – keyboards, violin (2012–2018, 2021–present)
- Christian Powers – drums, percussion (2024–present)

=== Former members ===
- Jonathan Draper – keyboards (2018)
- Robby Staebler – drums, backing vocals (2012–2024)

== Discography ==
=== Studio albums ===
- Our Mother Electricity (2012)
- Lightning at the Door (2013, re-released 2015)
- Dying Surfer Meets His Maker (2015)
- Sleeping Through the War (2017)
- ATW (2018)
- Nothing as the Ideal (2020)
- House of Mirrors (2026)

=== Live albums ===
- At the Garage (2015)
- Live in Brussels (2016)
- Live on the Internet (vinyl 2021, CD & digital 2021)

=== Extended plays ===
- All Them Witches (2012)
- Extra Pleasant (2013)
- Effervescent (2014)
- A Sweet Release (2015)
- Lost and Found (2018)

=== Non-album singles ===
- "Effervescent" (2013)
- "Born Under a Bad Sign" (2013) – cover of the 1967 single by Albert King
- "George "Dubya" Kush" (2014)
- "Voodoo Chile" (2015) – cover of the 1968 album track by Jimi Hendrix
- "Under Pressure" (2016) – cover of the 1981 single by Queen and David Bowie
- "Go and Seek" (2017) – from Sounds of Lynchburg (where the band traveled to Lynchburg, Tennessee, home of Jack Daniel's whiskey, for inspiration)
- "1x1" (2019)
- "Baker's Dozen" project - thirteen individual singles released in twelve months throughout 2022
  - "Blacksnake Blues" (2022) – cover of "Black Snake" by John Lee Hooker
  - "Fall Into Place" (2022)
  - "Silver to Rust" (2022)
  - "Slow City" (2022) – cover of the 2000 album track by Pharaoh Overlord
  - "Acid Face" (2022)
  - "L'Hotel Serein" (2022)
  - "6969 WXL THE CAGE" (2022)
  - "Tiger's Pit" (2022)
  - "Tour Death Song" (2022)
  - "Holding Your Breath Across the River" (2022)
  - "Hush, I'm on TV" (2022)
  - "Mama Is a Shining Star" (2022)
  - "Real Hippies are Cowboys" (2022)
