= Soundcheck (album) =

Live album by Circle
- Released: 2009
- Length: 47:44
- Label: Full Contact

Circle chronology
Hollywood (2008)	Soundcheck (2009)	Rautatie (2010)

Soundcheck is the thirty-third album by Finnish experimental rock band Circle.

It was issued as a limited edition vinyl LP by Full Contact in 2009. It was recorded on 31 October 2009 in Lahti, Finland, at the inaugural Space Force 1 festival held at Trovi. The core four-piece Circle line-up is joined by sound engineer Tuomas Laurila who supplies effects and the original live sound mix, and guitarist brothers Julius and Pekka Jääskeläinen, creating a dense, guitar-heavy sound.

Soundcheck is one of a series of vinyl-only albums released by Circle which document their often improvised freeform live shows.

== Track listing ==
Side A

- Kukkakaalia kapteenit! (3:40)
- Tuhatsata (20:39)

Side B

- Virsi (9:25)
- Nopeuskuningas (14:00)

== Personnel ==
- Jussi Lehtisalo
- Tomi Leppänen
- Mika Rättö
- Janne Westerlund
- Tuomas Laurila
- Julius Jääskeläinen
- Pekka Jääskeläinen
