= Rautatie (album) =

Studio album by Circle
- Released: 2010
- Length: 47:05
- Label: Ektro Records

Circle chronology
Soundcheck (2009)	Rautatie (2010)	Infektio (2011)

Rautatie is the thirty-fourth album by Finnish experimental rock band Circle.

It was issued in 2010 by Ektro Records and continues Circle's exploration of classic heavy metal whilst retaining their obsession with krautrock-style repetition. It was re-released in 2011, as a vinyl edition by Svart/Full Contact.

== Track listing ==
1. Rautatie (4:57)
2. Lääke (3:54)
3. Vaellus (7:58)
4. Kohtalon sormi (7:17)
5. Tähet (3:17)
6. Pelkkä meno (5:30)
7. Lautatarha (5:57)
8. Kaasukello (8:18)

== Personnel ==
- Jussi Lehtisalo
- Tomi Leppänen
- Mika Rättö
- Janne Westerlund
- Julius Jääskeläinen
- Pekka Jääskeläinen
