= Hollywood (Circle album) =

Studio album by Circle
- Released: 2008
- Length: 1:00:13
- Label: Ektro Records

Circle chronology
Triumph (2007)	Hollywood (2008)	Soundcheck (2009)

Hollywood is the thirty-second album by Finnish experimental rock band Circle.

Arguably their most overtly heavy metal album, it features vocals and guitar from Bruce Duff from the band Jesters of Destiny. The band's relationship with Duff began when Jussi Lehtisalo re-released Jesters' album Fun at the Funeral on his Ektro Records label. Following on from Duff's first collaboration with the band, Earthworm in 2006 (two tracks from that release, Connection and Earthworm, re-appear here), the American performer takes centre stage on Hollywood, which is named after his hometown. Final track Suddenly, part of a three-song suite called Requiem in D Minor, re-uses the music from the track Murheenkryyni which appears on the band's last two albums, Rakennus and Triumph.

== Track listing ==
1. Connection (3:43)
2. Mercy And Tuesday (7:53)
3. Earthworm (5:12)
4. Sacrifice (4:03)
5. Spam Folder (8:12)
6. Requiem in D Minor:
  - Hard to Realize (4:20)
  - Madman (15:19)
  - Suddenly (11:33)

== Personnel ==
- Bruce Duff
- Janne Westerlund
- Jussi Lehtisalo
- Tomi Leppänen
- Mika Rättö
