= Zopalki =

Studio album by Circle
- Released: 1996
- Length: 72:02
- Label: Bad Vugum

Circle chronology
Meronia (1994)	Zopalki (1996)	Hissi (1996)

Professional ratings
Review scores
Source	Rating
AllMusic	4/5 stars

Zopalki is the second album by the Finnish experimental rock band Circle. It was released in 1996 by Bad Vugum.

== Track listing ==
No.	Title	Length
1.	"Brilliant Colours for Bright Ideas"	4:46
2.	"Valerian"	3:45
3.	"Warszawa"	6:23
4.	"The Presence of Epileptics"	5:38
5.	"Argont"	8:39
6.	"O-Entru"	2:57
7.	"Bonoroid"	7:31
8.	"Sector"	6:05
9.	"Re-masturbated"	7:47
10.	"Ompatitions"	5:11
11.	"Ghatarian"	5:39
12.	"Gregorinum Vaernd Valerii"	7:41

== Personnel ==
- J. Ahtiainen
- T. Elo
- P. Hagner
- J-P. Hietaniemi
- J. Lehtisalo
- M. Päivistö
