= Earthworm (album) =

Studio album by Circle
- Released: 2006
- Length: 20.14
- Label: No Quarter Records

Circle chronology
| Arkades (2006) | Earthworm (2006) | Miljard (2009) |

Earthworm is the twenty minute album by the Finnish experimental rock band Circle.

The album has vocals and guitar from Bruce Duff of the band Jesters of Destiny. Circle's relationship with Duff began when Jussi Lehtisalo re-released the Jesters' album Fun at the Funeral on his Ektro Records label. Two tracks from Earthworm (the title track and "Connection") were re-issued twice, firstly on a 7" single included in the 2008 vinyl edition of Circle's album Tulikoira, and on the band's full-length album collaboration with Duff from 2008, Hollywood.

== Track listing ==
1. Earthworm (5:12)
2. Connection (3:43)
3. Taking It Back (5:37)
4. Coda (5:39)

== Personnel ==
- Bruce Duff
- Janne Westerlund
- Jussi Lehtisalo
- Tomi Leppänen
- Mika Rättö
