= Panic (Circle album) =

Studio album by Circle
- Released: 2007
- Length: 45.40
- Label: Ektro Records

Circle chronology
Tower (2007)	Panic (2007)	Katapult (2007)

Panic is the twenty-sixth album by the Finnish experimental rock band Circle.

It is one of the most idiosyncratic albums of Circle's long and varied career. It comprises eleven tracks. The first three are synthesizer-based ambient music pieces. These are followed by six short punk songs. Finally, the last two tracks are the almost silent "Tunnel" and the 15-minute drone piece "And Far Away". A sticker on the CD case describes the band as "Finland Speed-Kraut Pioneers" and refers to a list of obscure Finnish bands. Rather than their real names, the band are credited in the sleevenotes under pseudonyms: Jussi Lehtisalo is Junttura; Janne Westerlund is Sikiö; Tomi Leppänen is Mätky; and Mika Rättö is Klinga Präpierde. These alter-egos were used again for the 2011 EP Mylläri, which comprises four short punk songs in the style of the middle section of Panic.

== Track listing ==
1. "Black Tape" (5:41)
2. "State Powder" (3:41)
3. "Pigs In the Paper" (3:29)
4. "Neverending Dinner" (0:38)
5. "Good Day Rising" (0:59)
6. "Feed My Rabbit" (1:03)
7. "U.M.F.G. Horsemen" (1:25)
8. "We Must Breathe" (1:44)
9. "Misheritage" (1:09)
10. "Tunnel" (11:49)
11. "And Far Away" (14:04)

== Personnel ==
- Jussi Lehtisalo
- Tomi Leppänen
- Mika Rättö
- Janne Westerlund
