= Infektio =

Studio album by Circle
- Released: 2011
- Label: Conspiracy Records

Circle chronology
Rautatie (2010)	Infektio (2011)	Noiduttu (2011)

Infektio is the thirty-fifth album by Finnish experimental rock band Circle. It was released in 2011, on CD and limited vinyl.

== Track listing ==
- A1 Salvos (15:10)
- A2 Maatunut (6:20)
- B1 Peruuttamaton (7:57)
- B2 Pisara (5:38)
- B3 Saarnaaja (3:46)
- B4 Kalpea (2:57)

== Personnel ==
- Janne Westerlund
- Jussi Lehtisalo
- Tomi Leppänen
- Mika Rättö
- Julius Jääskeläinen
- Pekka Jääskeläinen
- Ash Bowie
