= Meronia =

Studio album by Circle
- Released: 1994/2007
- Length: 73:50
- Label: Bad Vugum, Ektro Records

Circle chronology
Meronia (1994)	Zopalki (1996)

Meronia is the first album by the Finnish experimental rock band Circle.

Released on CD and LP in 1994 by Bad Vugum, it was re-released by Ektro Records in 2007. The album showed Circle's tight krautrock-influenced sound, notably the motorik rhythm of Neu!.

Of the band members at the time of the recording, only the founding member Jussi Lehtisalo is still in the band, although the current guitarist Janne Westerlund contributes to the sleevenotes, commenting on the intensity of Circle's live performances at the time of the original release.

Some sources claim that the album's lyrics are sung in a made-up language, Meronian. If this is true, it predates Hopelandic, the language invented by Sigur Rós, by several years.

== Track listing ==
No.	Title	Length
1.	"Ed-Visio"	4:14
2.	"Curwen"	4:46
3.	"Wherever Particular People Congregate"	2:30
4.	"Meronia"	8:04
5.	"DNA"	5:13
6.	"Hypto"	6:48
7.	"Nude"	5:34
8.	"Colere"	3:36
9.	"Staalo"	6:58
10.	"Kyberia"	3:46
11.	"Gravion"	4:23
12.	"Ferrous"	4:14
13.	"Scoop"	7:00
14.	"Merid"	2:53
15.	"Espirites"	3:51

== Personnel ==
- J. Ahtiainen
- T. Elo
- P. Hagner
- J-P. Hietaniemi
- J. Lehtisalo
- M. Päivistö
