= Tower (album) =

Studio album by Circle
- Released: 2007
- Length: 44.07
- Label: Last Visible Dog

Circle chronology
Tyrant (2007)	Tower (2007)	Panic (2007)

Professional ratings
Review scores
Source	Rating
AllMusic	3.5/5 stars

Tower is the twenty-fifth album by the Finnish experimental rock band Circle. It was recorded in collaboration with Mika Rintala, who appears here under the alias Verde.

Members of Circle have been regular guests on Rintala's albums as Verde, often released on Jussi Lehtisalo's Ektro Records imprint. Here Rintala repays the favour on a collection of six keyboard-led instrumentals, occasionally reminiscent of Bitches Brew era Miles Davis. The tracks' names are the surname of a member of the group, including the sound engineer Tuomas Laurila, with the first letter replaced by a G.

== Track listing ==
1. Gerde (6:37)
2. Gättö (4:30)
3. Gesterlund (5:26)
4. Geppänen (13:00)
5. Gaurila (5:24)
6. Gehtisalo (9:24)

== Personnel ==
- Jussi Lehtisalo
- Tomi Leppänen
- Mika Rättö
- Janne Westerlund
- Mika Rintala
- Tuomas Laurila
