= Välimaa =

Välimaa is a Finnish surname. Notable people with the surname include:

- Jukka-Pekka Välimaa (born 1959), known as Kauko Röyhkä, Finnish rock musician and author
- Kirsi Välimaa (born 1978), Finnish cross-country skier
- Tero Välimaa (born 1978), Finnish swimmer
- Tommi Välimaa, Finnish ice hockey player
- Verneri Välimaa (born 1993), Finnish-American soccer player
