= Sasha Mäkilä =

Finnish conductor

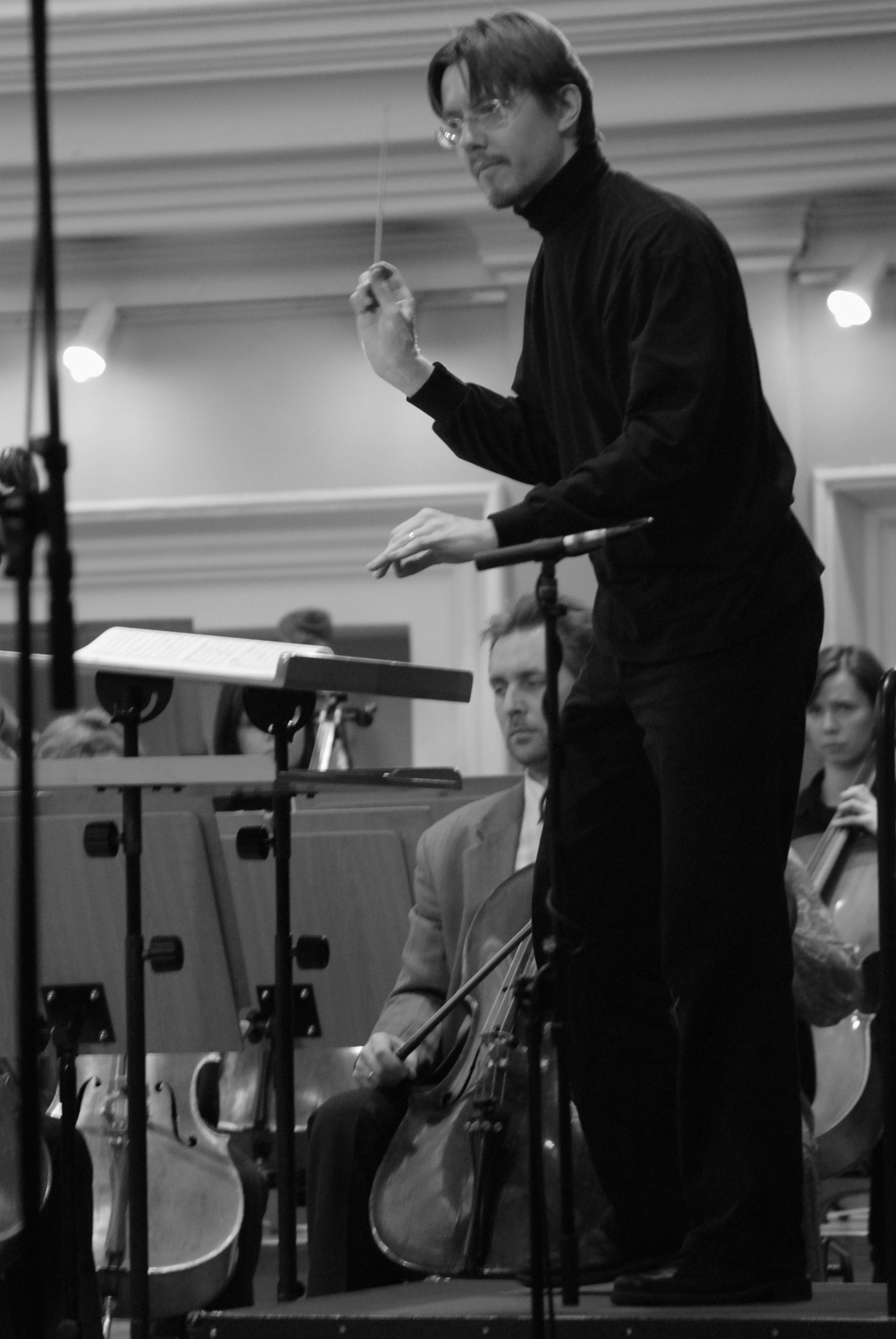
Sasha Mäkilä conducting the Silesian Philharmonic Orchestra in 2007

Sasha Aleksi Mäkilä (born June 19, 1973) is a Finnish conductor, conducting pedagogue and musicologist. He is an associate professor at Uniarts Helsinki.

== Biography ==
Sasha Mäkilä, born in Kerava, Finland, first studied cello at the Helsinki Conservatory before starting his conducting studies with Leonid Korchmar at the Rimsky-Korsakov State Conservatory of St. Petersburg, Russia. In 2004, while still a student, he was appointed conductor of the Symphony Orchestra of the Russian National Library in St Petersburg.

He later continued his studies at the Sibelius Academy with professor Leif Segerstam and at the American Academy of Conducting at Aspen with David Zinman. He also participated in master classes with notable conductors like Yuri Simonov, Kurt Masur and Jorma Panula.

In 2005 Mäkilä was a finalist in the Suwon International Conductors Competition in South Korea, and in 2006 he became a prize winner in the Sixth International Vakhtang Jordania Conducting Competition in the US.

From 2007 to 2010 Mäkilä served as assistant conductor to Kurt Masur at Orchestre National de France. From 2010-2012 he was Assistant Conductor of The Cleveland Orchestra under Music Director Franz Welser-Möst.

Sasha Mäkilä guest conducts orchestras in Europe, Asia, US and South Africa. He made his 2004 opera debut with the Helsinki Conservatory and later became the first in Finland to conduct operatic works of Philip Glass with Helsinki Skaala Opera. Mäkilä has also actively championed modern Finnish music, notably Kalevi Aho and Jukka Tiensuu.

In April 2012 Sasha Mäkilä was appointed Music Director of St. Michel Strings chamber orchestra in Mikkeli, Finland. In 2013 Helsinki University presented Sasha Mäkilä with the Pacius Award.
