= Miljard =

Miljard may refer to:

- 10^{9}, see Long and short scales
- Miljard (album), an album by Circle
