= Liimanarina =

Finnish folk-punk band

- Origin: Finland
- Genres: Lo-fi, Folk-punk
- Years active: 1989–1999; 2010–present
- Labels: Bad Vugum, Drag City
- Members: Olli Pauke; Heawy Lazzze; Roope Seppaelaeae, Tixu-Quincas Ois Cappuccino; Karri Koo Coyote / Karri Esmerald Pettersson
- Past members: Teemu Bergman; Tuomo Öjvind Runqvist; Kake Puhuu; Tarja Anarchy / Tarja Anarkia; Juha Alexei Vuori

Liimanarina is a Finnish folk-punk band from Helsinki. Fronted by singer-guitarist Olli Pauke, Liimanarina are known for their absurdist political lyrics, expository song titles, and abrasive lo-fi sound that has drawn comparisons to bands like The Fall and Half Japanese, as well as groups from the early No Wave scene.

== History ==
Liimanarina formed in 1989 with Olli Pauke on guitar and vocals, Kake Rainio (who had already taken the stage name "Kake Puhuu" or "Kake Speaks") on bass, and Karri Laitinen (who used various last names throughout his tenure in the band) on drums. The band's name was originally Yhteiskunnallisesti Puhtaat Munat ("socially fresh eggs") but they later shortened it to make themselves more marketable, settling on the neologism "Liimanarina," a Finnish compound word made up of liima meaning "glue" and narina meaning the creaky sound a door makes when opened. In 1989 Finnish punk record label Bad Vugum released Liimanarina's debut six-song EP, Maailman Tylsin Vittumaisuus ("The Most Boring Fuck-Up in the World"), jocularly called by its initials, "MTV". Around the same time, Pauke and Puhuu recorded and released a record under the name Keuhkot ("Lungs"), and Puhuu soon left Liimanarina to focus on Keuhkot as his primary project. In a 2001 interview, Puhuu described Liimanarina's sound and his reasons for leaving, saying:

My songs were too progressive for Liimanarina's tastes. It was frustrating to always make toilet-level music, to use only tape-recorder mics. For the drummer, it was only one rhythm—we called it 'the idiot-bastard rhythm.'

Liimanarina released two more six-song EPs through Bad Vugum—1990's Juutalaiset ("Jewry") and 1992's Läntinen Pornokatu 25 B 13 ("25-B West Porn Street #13"). That same year American label Sympathy for the Record Industry included Liimanarina on a compilation of Bad Vugum bands called If It Ain't The Snow It's The Mosquitos, which brought the sound of the band to U.S. audiences for the first time. These recordings caught the ear of the staff at Drag City Records in Chicago, who released an LP and CD in 1995 comprising "studio versions" of many songs previously heard on the Liimanarina's EPs. Dubbed Spermarket, the album's title appears on the front cover as "supermarket" but with the letter "u" blotted out and often appears as "S#PERMARKET" or "S*PERMARKET" in print. Liimanarina frontman Olli Pauke explained:

The whole point of the title was to pinpoint what a non-existent line there is between commercialism and prostitution today. Just take one letter off the name of the place, where everybody does their everyday shopping and it turns into something resembling a knocking shop.

Spermarket received extensive college radio airplay in the United States and ranked as the number one record of the year by Northwestern University station WNUR. Within a year of its release, Spermarket sold just over 1,200 copies and the label had paid the band a little more than $1,000 in royalties. Liimanarina had hoped to tour the United States in 1997, but Drag City did not have the funds to support them at the time. The group broke up soon thereafter.

=== Reunion and reissues ===
Liimanarina reformed in 2010 with a newly recorded 10-inch album on the small vinyl record label Temmikongi and gigs to support it. Bad Vugum soon compiled the band's three EPs for re-release on LP and CD. Recorded from the original vinyl, the songs on these reissues include surface noise heard on copies the 7-inches from which they were taken. The band has continued to perform and release material on a number of small labels.

== Themes ==
The insert to Spermarket featured Pauke's original Finnish language lyrics on one side with English language translations by Italian-born Manuela Cumangettit on the other. The lyrics show the band's penchant for absurdism in several recurring themes. Songs like "Venäjän Viimeinen & Eestin Ensimmäinen Elvis" ("The Last Elvis in Russia but First in Estonia"), "Iänikuinen Sämpyläkuljetus Lumisateessa" ("The Everlasting Delivery of French Rolls in Driving Snow"), and "Mikähän On Kolmanneks Yleisin Koirannimi Kongossa?" ("What might be the 3rd Most Popular Dog's Name in Congo") all jab at nationhood. The mention of Elvis, along with "Sam Kokin Sätkynuket #74 & 36" ("Sam Cooke's Puppets Nos. 74 and 36") and "Vihaan Kaikkea Paitsi Matlockia" ("I Hate Everything But Matlock") give a nod to celebrities and pop culture, the latter song title being a Simpsons quote about the long-running American legal-drama TV series starring Andy Griffith. The band also made incessant digs at the police in songs like "Kuinka Aku Ankasta Tehdään Poliisi" ("How Donald Duck Made Police") and "Siat On Älykkäitä Eläimiä, Mutta Huonoja Poliiseja" ("Pigs are Intelligent Animals, but Bad Cops").

== Discography ==
Extended plays

- Maailman Tylsin Vittumaisuus (Bad Vugum 7-inch EP, 1989)
- Juutalaiset (Bad Vugum 7-inch EP, 1990)
- Läntinen Pornokatu 25 B 13 (Bad Vugum 7-inch EP, 1992)

Albums

- Live in Heinola (self-published cassette, 1993)
- Spermarket (Drag City LP/CD, 1995)
- First I Look At The Tits (Mieletön Mutantti cassette, 2011)
- The Puute Plays Liimanarina: Live At Le Piss (Temmikongi LP, 2011)
- Dokauschwitz (Donkikong/Stupido 10-inch/CD, 2014)

Collections

- Linkolalaista Lähiörokkia Landelta (Läskiä & Lotinaa, Moka-Kolaa & Mökäöljyä) (Bad Vugum CD compiling the group's first three 7-inchs and extra tracks, 2008)
- Keskenmenobileet (Bad Vugum LP compiling the groups's first three 7-inchs, 2012)

== Music Videos ==
- "Kuinka Aku Ankasta tehdään poliisi" ("How Donald Duck Made Police") from 1989's Maailman Tylsin Vittumaisuus EP
- "Naapurin pojat puisine lintuineen" ("The neighbors' sons with their dead birds") instrumental from 1989's Maailman Tylsin Vittumaisuus EP

== Members ==
Early lineup

- Olli Pauke (vocals, guitar)
- Tarja Jelena Anarkia (backing vocals)
- Karri Laitinen (drums)
- Kake Puhuu (bass on first EP)
- Juha Alexei Vuori (bass on 2nd EP)
- Tuomo Alberto Nykänen / Tuomo Öjvind Runqvist (bass on 3rd EP and 1st LP)

Since reforming

- Kimmon Naukkarinen
- Teemu Bergman
- Lasse Auranne
- Roope Seppälä
