= Earthworm (disambiguation) =

Earthworm is a common name referring to many various species of worm which typically live underground.

Earthworm or The Earthworm may also refer to:

- Earthworm (album), an album by Circle
- The Earthworm (album), a 1995 hip-hop album by LPG
- Earthworm (comics), a DC Comics character
- The Earthworm, a character from the 1967 novel James and the Giant Peach
