= Pharaoh Overlord 2 =

Pharaoh Overlord #2

Studio album by Pharaoh Overlord
- Released: 2003
- Length: 50:49
- Label: No Quarter Records

Pharaoh Overlord chronology
Pharaoh Overlord #1 (2000)	Pharaoh Overlord #2 (2003)	The Battle Of The Axehammer (Live) (2004)

Pharaoh Overlord #2 is the second album by Finnish experimental rock band Pharaoh Overlord.

It was released on CD in 2003 by No Quarter Records. It features three members of krautrock-influenced rock band Circle indulging their love for stoner rock. Like its predecessor, the album is completely instrumental and the tracks follow a basic model of repetitive riffs. However, it is a much more subdued record than Pharaoh Overlord #1 even featuring acoustic guitars in places. Only Skyline contained the heavy distortion of the first album, and became a live staple for the band, appearing on both Pharaoh Overlord's live albums, The Battle Of The Axehammer (Live) and Live In Suomi Finland.

Track List:

1. Komaron Runner (6:04)
2. August (5:59)
3. Dark Temper (7:51)
4. Skyline (9:58)
5. Love Unfiltered (10:50)
6. Who Were You (10:09)

Personnel:

Jussi Lehtisalo
Tomi Leppänen
Janne Westerlund
