= Pori (album) =

Studio album by Circle
- Released: 1998/2000
- Length: 65:12
- Label: Metamorphos, Feldspar Records

Circle chronology
Fraten (1997)	Pori (1998)	Kollekt (1998)

Professional ratings
Review scores
Source	Rating
AllMusic	4/5 stars

Pori is the fifth album by the Finnish experimental rock band Circle. It is named after the home town of the band, Pori in southern Finland, and the sleevenotes contain a number of historical and geographical facts about the city. It was originally released on Metamorphos Records in 1998, before receiving a US release on Feldspar Records in 2000.

== Track listing ==
1. Perustamisasiakirja 8.3.1558 (3:40)
2. Vesitorni/Kaupunginsairaala (8:08)
3. Back To Pori (4:58)
4. Suurpalo (2:08)
5. Kartano (7:24)
6. Promenaadikeskus (7:25)
7. Kruuna Päähä Pori Kuningas (9:04)
8. Seisomakatsomo (2:48)
9. Karhun Kansaa 1. (5:50)
10. Porin Jazzjuhlat -65 (13:49)

== Personnel ==
- T. Elo – guitars, vocals
- T. Harrivaara – bass guitar, double bass
- J. Lehtisalo – guitars, keyboards, vocals
- T. Niemelä – keyboards, stick
- J. Peltomäki – drums
- V. Raitio – percussion
