= Pharaoh Overlord 1 =

Pharaoh Overlord #1

Studio album by Pharaoh Overlord
- Released: 2000
- Length: 54:51
- Label: Ektro Records

Pharaoh Overlord chronology
Pharaoh Overlord #1 (2000)	Pharaoh Overlord #2 (2003)

Pharaoh Overlord #1 is the debut album by Finnish experimental rock band Pharaoh Overlord. It was released on CD in 2000 by Ektro Records.

The album features three members of krautrock-influenced rock band Circle indulging their love for stoner rock. All the tracks are instrumental and follow a basic model of hugely distorted, repetitive riffs. Although Pharaoh Overlord were to move away from this sound in subsequent albums, it remains the cornerstone of their live performances; the song Mangrove appears on both Pharaoh Overlord's live albums, The Battle Of The Axehammer (Live) and Live In Suomi Finland.

== Track listing ==
1. Slow City (9:54)
2. Mangrove (9:12)
3. Mystery Shopper (10:23)
4. Transatlantic (7:11)
5. Alcohol (Blue Flame) (8:13)
6. Landslide Non Stop (9:50)

== Personnel ==
- Jussi Lehtisalo
- Tomi Leppänen
- Janne Westerlund
