= Aavikko =

Finnish musical group

- Origin: Siilinjärvi, Finland
- Years active: 1995
- Labels: Bad Vugum

Aavikko is a Finnish synth music band, formed in Siilinjärvi in 1995. Their hallmarks include a campy, decidedly "East European" style and plastic-sounding synthesizer themes. The band themselves call their style "muysic" (a portmanteau of "mystic" and "music"); their motto is "We play - you dance!".

One of their well received songs is "Viitostie", which is strongly influenced by Kraftwerk. The name is a reference to Finnish national road 5, or "Viitostie", which is a highway in Finland that passes through Siilinjärvi.

== Members ==
- Tomi Kosonen, keyboards and saxophone
- Tomi Leppänen, drums and electric percussion (Leppänen is also a member of Circle, Pharaoh Overlord and K-X-P)
- Paul Staufenbiel, keyboards (1998-)

Former members

- Antti Koivumäki (b. 1976, d. 2002), electric organ (1995-1998)

== Discography ==
- Aavikko 7-inch EP/MCD (Bad Vugum, 1996)
- Derek! LP/CD (Bad Vugum, 1997)
- Oriental Baby EP (1999)
- Multi Muysic (2000)
- Viitostie EP (2000)
- Aavikko & Felix Kubin EP (2001)
- Aavikko & Mono Pause EP (2002)
- History of Muysic (collection, 2003)
- Meets Hit Singer Kabar (single, 2004)
- Back from the Futer (2005)
- Novo Atlantis (2009)
- Planet Fun-Fun (mini-LP, 2013)
- Monopoly (2019)
- Sound of Muysic (2023)
