= Andexelt =

Studio album by Circle
- Released: 1999
- Length: 76:04
- Label: Metamorphos/tUMULt

Circle chronology
Surface (1998)	Andexelt (1999)	Prospekt (2000)

Andexelt is the eighth album by the Finnish experimental rock band Circle. It was released in 1999 by Metamorphos, and re-issued the following year by tUMULt with an extra track.

== Critical reception ==
Allmusic's Brian Way called Andexelt "the most linear and rewarding of all of Circle's vast catalog." Way added that the band's sound on the album comes closer "to American retro-futurists like Trans Am, the Octopus Project, and Six Finger Satellite than their usual Krautrock forebears." Paul Cooper of Pitchfork remarked that the album "surpasses Brainticket's Adventure, and equals Can's Future Days in loaded grace." A review of the album in a 2001 issue of The Wire said with "the seductive formulae of complex 4/4 rhythm clusters and low slung basslmes, it's an album of Arctic atmospheres, highlighted by the near Thomas Kbner-like frigidity of 'Fnitalan Mashick'".

== Track listing ==
No.	Title	Length
1.	"Andexelt"	6:31
2.	"Odultept"	9:03
3.	"20milate"	8:57
4.	"Lisääpui"	5:21
5.	"Humusaar"	8:31
6.	"Paljasta"	5:50
7.	"Vereftoi"	7:36
8.	"Kidulgos"	6:22
9.	"Friitalan Nahka"	17:53

== Personnel ==
- T. Elo
- J. Laiho
- J. Lehtisalo
- T. Niemelä
- J. Peltomäki
