= Nothing as the Ideal =

Studio album by All Them Witches
- Released: September 4, 2020
- Recorded: March 2020
- Studio: Abbey Road
- Genres: Stoner rock; neo-psychedelia
- Length: 48:43
- Label: New West
- Producers: All Them Witches; Mikey Allred

All Them Witches chronology
ATW (2018)	Nothing as the Ideal (2020)	House of Mirrors (2026)

Nothing as the Ideal is the sixth studio album by American psychedelic rock band All Them Witches. It was released on September 4, 2020, through New West Records.

== Background and production ==
After the release of 2018's ATW, All Them Witches drummer Robby Staebler converted his Nashville home into a studio, which proved creatively uneventful for the band, who recorded only one track there. The band decided to hire Mikey Allred, who had previously produced 2015's Dying Surfer Meets His Maker, to help record their sixth studio album. After two months of writing, All Them Witches recorded Nothing as the Ideal in March 2020 at Abbey Road Studios.

== Composition and themes ==
Nothing as the Ideal has been classified as a stoner rock and neo-psychedelia album.

== Reception ==
Professional ratings
Aggregate scores
Source	Rating
Metacritic	85/100
Review scores
Source	Rating
AllMusic	4.5/5 stars
Classic Rock	4/5 stars
Dead Press!	4/10
The Line of Best Fit	9/10
MusicOMH	3.5/5 stars
New Noise Magazine	3.5/5 stars
Paste	7.9/10

Nothing as the Ideal was met with mostly positive reviews from music critics. At Metacritic, which assigns a normalized rating out of 100 to reviews from mainstream critics, Nothing as the Ideal has an average score of 85 based on five reviews.

Tyler Damara Kelly of The Line of Best Fit compared Nothing as the Ideal to the works of Kyuss and Tool, and praised how All Them Witches were able to retool as a trio, with "each musician being undoubtedly proficient in their craft and able to create with a dynamism that is truly unparalleled". James Christopher Monger of AllMusic, similarly, praised how the remaining band members "have crystallized their signature amalgam of improvisation and songcraft into an exclamation point where every soaring lead, snare crack, and mechanical whirr feels essential". Nicolas Perez of Paste said that the absence of keyboard was "barely noticeable since the songs have no uncomfortable gaps".

Certain critics highlighted the epic nature of the album, and individual tracks within. Polly Glass of Classic Rock said that, particularly with the addition of "See You Next Fall" and "Rats in Ruin", Nothing as the Ideal "feels as much like a film soundtrack as it does a hooky rock'n'roll album". Graeme Marsh of musicOMH added that the two longest tracks on the album "top nine minutes yet leave you dissatisfied that they didn't last twice as long". John Moore of New Noise Magazine said that the album, "though it might take a few cycles to catch, is a wildly satisfying experience".

Some reviewers criticized a perceived lack of experimentation and originality on Nothing as the Ideal. Shawn Donohue of Glide said that Nothing as the Ideal was "an excellent sounding but slightly flat affair as the band settles into life as a trio", and that the "sound experiments and tape collages" in the album "feel tacked on to spruce up a standard number more laboriously". Tom Morgan of Dead Press! compared certain tracks to Mastodon, Royal Blood, and Led Zeppelin, before asking, "Why bother to even emulate these artists and sounds from so long ago?"

== Track listing ==
All tracks are written by All Them Witches.

Nothing as the Ideal track listing
No.	Title	Length
1.	"Saturnine & Iron Jaw"	6:49
2.	"Enemy of My Enemy"	3:29
3.	"Everest"	2:07
4.	"See You Next Fall"	9:50
5.	"The Children of Coyote Woman"	3:36
6.	"41"	5:20
7.	"Lights Out"	3:13
8.	"Rats in Ruin"	9:10
Total length:		43:34

== Personnel ==
All Them Witches

- Michael Parks, Jr. – vocals, bass, guitar, loops, piano
- Ben McLeod – guitar, resonator, loops, piano
- Robby Staebler – drums, synthesizer, loops, tapes

Technical

- Mikey Allred – producer, mixing, mastering
- Neil Dawes – assistant engineer

Information taken from the Nothing as the Ideal liner notes.

== Charts ==
Chart performance for Nothing as the Ideal
Chart (2020)	Peak position
Austrian Albums (Ö3 Austria)	70
Belgian Albums (Ultratop Flanders)	56
German Albums (Offizielle Top 100)	30
Swiss Albums (Schweizer Hitparade)	57
US Heatseekers Albums (Billboard)	11
US Indie Store Album Sales (Billboard)	7
US Top Hard Rock Albums (Billboard)	25
US Vinyl Albums (Billboard)	15

== Formats ==
The album was released on most streaming services, sold as a digital download from the band's website, and issued on compact disc, vinyl, and cassette tape.

Vinyl variants
Edition	Color	Weight
New West exclusive	Opaque green	140g
Special edition picture disc	Picture	180g
Bandcamp exclusive deluxe edition	Translucent lysergic purple	180g
Limited edition color	Green & black galaxy	140g
Standard edition	Black	140g
