= Sleeping Through the War =

Studio album by All Them Witches
- Released: February 24, 2017
- Length: 46:07
- Label: New West

All Them Witches chronology
| Dying Surfer Meets His Maker (2015) | Sleeping Through the War (2017) | ATW (2018) |

Sleeping Through the War is the fourth studio album by American band All Them Witches. It was released in February 2017 under New West Records.

Professional ratings
Review scores
| Source | Rating |
|---|---|
| Clash Magazine | 9/10 |
| The Line of Best Fit | 8.5/10 |
| AllMusic | 4/5 stars |

== Track listing ==
| No. | Title | Length |
|---|---|---|
| 1. | "Bulls" | 6:40 |
| 2. | "Don't Bring Me Coffee" | 3:10 |
| 3. | "Bruce Lee" | 3:11 |
| 4. | "3-5-7" | 3:56 |
| 5. | "Am I Going Up?" | 5:33 |
| 6. | "Alabaster" | 6:57 |
| 7. | "Cowboy Kirk" | 6:50 |
| 8. | "Internet" | 9:50 |

== Charts ==
| Chart | Peak position |
|---|---|
| Belgian Albums (Ultratop Flanders) | 76 |
| Dutch Albums (Album Top 100) | 195 |
| US Heatseekers Albums (Billboard) | 11 |
| US Independent Albums (Billboard) | 31 |

== Personnel ==
All Them Witches

- Ben McLeod - guitar, bass, Mellotron, percussion
- Allan Van Cleave - organ, piano, Mellotron, Fender Rhodes electric piano
- Charles Michael Parks Jr. - bass, vocals, guitar, Mellotron, percussion, loops
- Robby Staebler - drums, congas

Additional personnel

- Caitlin Rose - vocals (tracks 1, 4–6)
- Erin Rae - vocals (tracks 1, 4–6)
- Tristen Gaspardek - vocals (tracks 1, 4–6)
- Dave Cobb - percussion (track 3)
- Mickey Raphael - harmonica (track 8)

== Accolades ==
| Publication | Accolade | Rank | Ref. |
|---|---|---|---|
| Classic Rock | Top 50 Albums of 2017 | 9 | |
