= Mugstar =

English rock band

Mugstar are an English rock band, influenced by kraut/psych/space/noise rock such as Oneida, Sonic Youth, Neu! and Hawkwind. Since 2003 they have issued several full-length albums, a split release with Mudhoney and two live albums performing on stage together with Damo Suzuki. Mugstar recorded one of the last-ever Peel Sessions with the late John Peel on 5 May 2004. Record labels: Rock Action, Important Records (U.S.A.), Cardinal Fuzz, Weird Beard, Agitated, Evil Hoodoo, Rocket Recordings, Trensmat, God Unknown, Chunklet Industries (U.S.A.), Hands In The Dark / All Time Low, Lancashire & Somerset, kool tone, critical MASS...

== History ==
Mugstar formed in Liverpool, England. Their first single, "Spotlight Over Memphis", drew attention from John Peel, who played the 7-inch on his radio show. It was after the next 7-inch, "Flavin' HotRod", that Peel offered the band a Peel Session. A split 7-inch with Hunting Lodge followed. A mini-album on Kabukikore Records, "Dark Matter", came next, closely followed by a session for BBC Radio One's Huw Stephens. In January 2006 the band released "My Baby Skull Has Not Yet Flowered".

The band's self-titled debut album was released on CD at the end of 2006 on Sea Records, and on Critical MASS Records as a limited run of heavy weight vinyl in 2007. Mugstar then started a productive relationship with Ireland-based Trensmat Records with a run of limited 7-inch singles. One of these releases was a split 7-inch with Seattle's Mudhoney, with both bands doing covers of Hawkwind songs. During this time Red Panda and Mugstar featured on a one-sided 10-inch single, each performing half of "Tam Lin", a song made famous by Fairport Convention.

Mugstar signed to Important Records, who then released "...Sun, Broken..." CD in March 2010 and their third album, "Lime", was released also on CD in November 2010. For Record Store Day 2011 Mugstar contributed a cover of "I Got the Six" by ZZ Top for "I'm So Agitated", a 12-inch also featuring Carlton Melton, The Heads and Kool Aid, on Agitated Records. The "Lime" album got its vinyl release through Agitated Records in September 2011. These were followed by a split album on Rocket Recordings with New York's Oneida - called "Collisions 2" - and a 40-minute remix of "Serra" (from "Lime") by Loop's Robert Hampson.

"Ad Marginem" - Original Film Soundtrack. Vinyl album with DVD, was released in September 2012. The film / album launch was celebrated with Mugstar performing the soundtrack live to film screenings, at Liverpool's Bluecoat and Rough Trade East in London. (The screening with live soundtrack has subsequently been performed a number of times... in Bishop's Castle, at the Roadburn Festival in Tilburg (NL), The Cube Cinema, Bristol and most recently in 2018 in the Music Room at the Liverpool Philharmonic Hall.)

The release of the band's fifth album, Axis, followed in late 2012.

In April 2013, they performed a radio session for Marc Riley on his BBC 6 Music evening show.

For Record Store Day 2013 Mugstar released Centralia their sixth album on the Cardinal Fuzz label.

Mugstar released Start from Zero a live album - recorded with Damo Suzuki in Liverpool, summer 2012 - on Important Records in January 2015.

February 2016 saw Mugstar performing a second radio session for Marc Riley on his BBC 6 Music evening show.

The double album: Magnetic Seasons was released in 2016 on Rock Action Records.

The singles and rarities compilation album: Collapsar - Skull Scorchers & Neuron Phasers was released in December 2017 on double heavy vinyl format by Evil Hoodoo Records.

In 2018 Mugstar performed together with Damo Suzuki for a second time. This was for Wrong Festival at the Invisible Wind Factory in Liverpool. The recording was released on Weird Beard in July 2020.

Mugstar's latest studio album "Graft" was released on the Cardinal Fuzz label in October 2020.

== Discography ==
- "Spotlight Over Memphis" 7-inch - critical MASS Records (10/03)
- "Flavin HotRod" 7-inch - critical MASS Records (05/04)
- Peel Session BBC Radio 1 (10/04)
- Split 7-inch with Hunting Lodge - Farm Girl Records (11/04)
- Dark Matter Mini-Album CD - Kabukikore Records (03/05)
- Trail Singles Comp. CD - critical MASS Records (10/05)
- "My Baby Skull Has Not Yet Flowered" 7-inch - Lancashire & Somerset Records (01/06)
- Mugstar' Album - CD Sea Records / Vinyl critical MASS Records (11/06)
- "Bethany Heart Star" 7-inch - Trensmat Records (01/07)
- "Born To Go" 7-inch Split with Mudhoney - Trensmat Records (11/08)
- "Today Is The Wrong Shape" Extracts from the Ether Vol. 1 Compilation CD - kool tone Records (2008)
- "Tam Lin"' 10-inch Split with Red Panda - Lancashire & Somerset Records (12/08)
- "Technical Knowledge As A Weapon" 7-inch - Trensmat Records (08/09)
- ...Sun, Broken... Album. CD Important Records (03/10) Vinyl re-issue Cardinal Fuzz Records (2014)
- In Search of Hawkwind Tribute Album with Kinski, Magoo, Bardo Pond, Mudhoney, Acid Mothers Temple, Moon Duo & White Hills. CD - critical MASS records (2010)
- "Red Shift" / "Blue Shift" 7-inch - Champion Version (10/10)
- Lime Album. CD Important Records (11/10) Vinyl Agitated Records (09/11)
- Collisions 2 Split album with Oneida vinyl - Rocket Recordings (10/11)
- "Distant Sun" Serra Remix by Robert Hampson Vinyl album / CD - Agitated Records (11/11)
- "Black Fountain" Split 7-inch with Carlton Melton - Trensmat Records (12/11)
- Ad Marginem Original Film Soundtrack. Vinyl album with DVD - Agitated Records (09/12)
- Axis Album. Vinyl / CD - Agitated Records (10/12)
- Centralia Album. Vinyl - Cardinal Fuzz Records (04/13)
- Travel Expop Series #2: Great Britain split album with The Oscillation / Ben Nash / Listening Mirror Hands In The Dark / All Time Low Records (08/13)
- Split 12-inch with Cosmic Dead - Evil Hoodoo Records (2014)
- Start From Zero Album. Recorded live with Damo Suzuki. Vinyl only - Important Records (01/15)
- Split 7-inch with White Hills - God Unknown Records (03/15)
- "Kabuki Skull" / "Goat Head" USA tour 7-inch - Chunklet Industries (05/15)
- Magnetic Seasons Album. Double Vinyl LP with download / CD - Rock Action Records (03/16)
- Collapsar: Skull Scorchers & Neuron Phasers Compilation album of singles and rarities on double heavy vinyl - Evil Hoodoo Records (12/17)
- File #733 U.F.O. Further Investigation Various Artists Double Vinyl LP featuring two new exclusive MUGSTAR tracks - Granite Trees & Drones on Drones - on the Modern Harmonic label (11/19)
- Invisible Wind Factory Album. Recorded live with Damo Suzuki. Vinyl with download - Weird Beard Records (7/20)
- Graft Album. Vinyl with download - Cardinal Fuzz Records (10/20)

== Band members ==
- Steve Ashton - Drums
- Neil Murphy - Guitar
- Rob McLean - Bass

Previous members:

- Marc Glaysher - Bass
- Joe Hirons - Guitar/Keyboards
- Pete Smyth - Guitar/Vocals/Keyboards
- Jason Stoll - Bass
- Chris Stevens - Bass
- Adrian R. Shaw - Guitar/Vocals
- Martin Ward - Guitar
- Luke Mawdsley - Guitar
- Rob McLean - Vocals
