= ATW (album) =

2018 album by All Them Witches

Studio album by All Them Witches
- Released: September 28, 2018
- Studios: MANT Studios, Los Angeles
- Genres: Psychedelic rock; blues rock
- Length: 51:52
- Label: New West
- Producer: Ben McLeod

All Them Witches chronology
Sleeping Through the War (2017)	ATW (2018)	Nothing as the Ideal (2020)

ATW is the fifth studio album by American psychedelic rock band All Them Witches. The album was released on September 28, 2018, through New West Records.

== Background and production ==
In a July 2018 interview with DEAD PRESS!, All Them Witches announced that they had begun writing their new album that January, and were aiming for a release around the end of September.

ATW has been classified as a psychedelic rock and blues rock album. The band self-produced the album at a secluded cabin 20 miles (32 km) outside of their hometown of Nashville, Tennessee. ATW was recorded in five days, with All Them Witches recording each song around five times. Mixing was done at MANT Studios in Los Angeles, California, while mastering took place at Infrasonic Sound in Nashville.

== Release and promotion ==
An official music video for the track "Diamond" was released on September 12, 2018. Directed by the band's drummer Robby Staebler, the video was shot on 16 mm film, and was meant to "present the song in a cinematic and contemplative way."

== Reception ==
Professional ratings
Aggregate scores
Source	Rating
Metacritic	72/100
Review scores
Source	Rating
AllMusic	3.5/5 stars
American Songwriter	4/5 stars
Exclaim!	7/10
PopMatters	7/10

ATW was met with mostly positive reviews from music critics. At Metacritic, which assigns a normalized rating out of 100 to reviews from mainstream critics, ATW has an average score of 72 based on five reviews.

Critics largely contrasted ATW with its predecessor, 2017's Sleeping Through the War, and other All Them Witches releases. Paul Carr of PopMatters said that the band "stripped away the more expansive, excess" of the previous album "but retained the same sense of experimentation". Elijah Teed of Exclaim! said that the stoner rock of earlier albums "is not as easy to spot on ATW, which favours reflectiveness over rambunctious riffs".

Reviews also highlighted the natural progression of All Them Witches' sound on their new album. Hal Horowitz of American Songwriter said that there are "plenty of bands trying to capture this distressing atmosphere of dread, uncertainty and slowly enveloping darkness, but few do it with the class, subtlety and controlled intensity of All Them Witches". James Christopher Monger of AllMusic praised ATW as "a product of pure instinct, and while it may take some patience to absorb, there isn't a single note that feels coerced".

== Track listing ==
All tracks are written by All Them Witches.

Standard edition track listing
No.	Title	Length
1.	"Fishbelly 86 Onions"	6:02
2.	"Workhorse"	5:44
3.	"1st vs. 2nd"	5:58
4.	"Half-Tongue"	4:35
5.	"Diamond"	6:09
6.	"Harvest Feast"	10:45
7.	"HJTC"	5:48
8.	"Rob's Dream"	6:51
Total length:		51:52

== Personnel ==
All Them Witches

- Charles Michael Parks, Jr. – vocals, bass, six-string bass, loops
- Ben McLeod – electric and acoustic guitars
- Robby Staebler – drums, percussion, loops

Additional musicians

- Jonathan Draper – Fender Rhodes electric piano, organ, synthesizers, percussion

Technical

- Ben McLeod – production
- Grant Husselman – recording
- Rob Schnapf – mixing
- Pete Lyman – mastering

Information taken from the ATW liner notes.

== Charts ==
Chart performance for ATW
Chart (2016)	Peak position
US Independent Albums (Billboard)	30
US Heatseekers Albums (Billboard)	15
