= Mika Taanila =

Finnish film director and visual artist (born 1965)

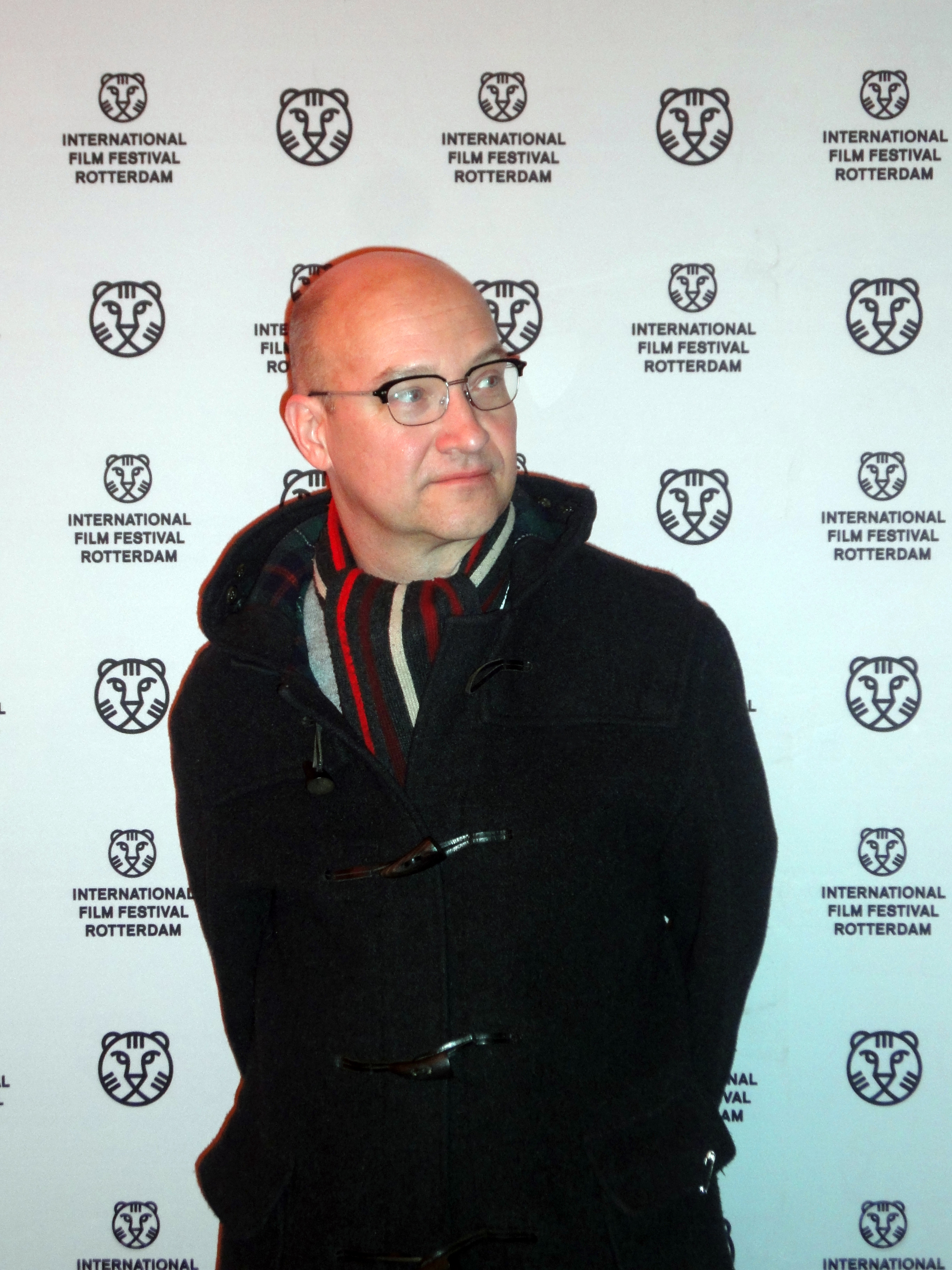
Mika Taanila after a screening of "Six Day Run" at the International Film Festival Rotterdam, 2013

Mika Taanila (born 1965 in Helsinki) is a Finnish film director and visual artist.

His films can be categorized somewhere between the traditions of classic documentary film-making, avant-garde and video art. His most notable films are Tectonic Plate (2016), Return of The Atom (2015, co-dir. with Jussi Erola), Optical Sound (2005), The Future Is Not What It Used To Be (2002) and Futuro – A New Stance for Tomorrow (1998).

In addition to traditional cinematic screenings, Taanila shows his works also in galleries and museum as film and video installations.

Taanila has participated to numerous international group shows, such as The Venice Biennale (2017), Aichi Triennale (2013), Arctic Hysteria at PS.1. (2008), Shanghai Biennale (2006), Berlin Biennale (2004) and Manifesta 4 (2002). Solo shows include Padiglione de L'Esprit Nouveau in Bologna (2020), STUK Leuven (2018), Kiasma Museum of Contemporary Art in Helsinki (2013–2014), Contemporary Art Museum, St. Louis (2013), TENT Rotterdam (2013), Badischer Kunstverein, Karlsruhe (2008), Dazibao, Montréal (2007) and Migrosmuseum, Zurich (2005).

In the summer 2012 Taanila participated at dOCUMENTA (13) with a three channel (3 x 16 metres) video installation The Most Electrified Town In Finland (2012). The piece uses documentary footage during the construction of Olkiluoto 3 nuclear power plant in Finland. Taanila and Jussi Eerola have directed also a feature documentary called Return of the Atom. The film premiered in Toronto International Film Festival and won the NORDIC:DOX award at CPH:DOX festival in November 2015, and was released theatrically in Finland and Germany.

In May 2015 Taanila received the Ars Fennica Award. He was one of the six artists in the Nordic Pavilion group show "Mirrored" at the Venice Biennale of 2017.

Taanila's film, Tectonic Plate (2016), is a cameraless feature film.

== Filmography (selection) ==
- Patent Nr. 314805 (2020, 2 min)
- The World / The Earth Who Fell to Man (2017, 8 min)
- Tectonic Plate (2016, 74 min, DCP)
- Return of the Atom (2015, 109 min, DCP, co-dir. with Jussi Eerola)
- My Silence (2013, 15 min, video)
- Six Day Run (2013, 15 min, DCP)
- The Most Electrified Town In Finland (2012, 15 min, 3 x HD)
- The Zone of Total Eclipse (2006, 6 min, 2 x 16mm)
- Optical Sound (2005, 6 min, 35 mm)
- The Future Is Not What It Used To Be (2002, 52 min, 35 mm)
- A Physical Ring (2002, 4 min, 35 mm)
- RoboCup99 (2000, 25 min, 35 mm)
- Futuro – A New Stance For Tomorrow (1998, 29 min, 35 mm)
- Thank You For The Music – A Film About Muzak (1997, 24 min, 35mm)

== Publications (selection) ==
- Pakasteet with Ilia Belorukov: Yksityisalue (2020, Ruton Music) cassette
- Pakasteet ja Draama-Helmi: Tyhjä risteys (2019, Full Contact) LP
- Pakasteet with Charles Hayward: Molten Salt (2019, Full Contact) LP
- Black and White Movies (2018, Luova) photo book
- Pakasteet with Jukka Nousiainen: Kylmäketju katkeaa (2018, Ruton Music) cassette
- Pakasteet: Pula (2017, Ruton Music) cassette, musical collaboration of Mika Taanila and Jussi Lehtisalo
- Tectonic Plate (2017, Testifilmi) Blu-ray box
- Presents (2017, Ruton Music) endless cassette
- Stimulus Progression (2015, Apparent Extent/Badischer Kunstverein) 10" vinyl EP of processed background music field-recordings
- Time Machines (2013, Kiasma Museum of Contemporary Art in Helsinki) monograph, eds. Leevi Haapala, Kati T. Kivinen
- Musiikkivyöry: Tulemme sokeiksi (2009, Ektro Records) cd, compilation of Mika Taanila's teen-age home recordings
- Aika & aine (Time & Matter, 2006, Reel23, Amsterdam) DVD compilation of five short films by Mika Taanila.
- Mika Taanila (JRP|Ringier, 2005) monograph, ed. Heike Munder
- Futuro. Tomorrow’s House from Yesterday (2002, Desura Books, Helsinki) 192-page book plus 75-minute DVD about The Futuro House. Co-edited with Marko Home.
- The Dawn of DIMI (2002, Kiasma/Kinotar) A DVD on Erkki Kurenniemi's electronic art. Editor: Mika Taanila.
