= St. Michel Strings =

Chamber orchestra of Mikkeli, Finland

St. Michel Strings (Finnish: Mikkelin kaupunginorkesteri, Swedish: St. Michels stadsorkester) is a chamber orchestra based in Mikkeli, Finland, and supported by the municipality. It is the third oldest professional orchestra in Finland.

The orchestra was founded in 1903 as an amateur ensemble with a professional conductor and a concert master on a monthly payroll, and during the following decades it slowly transformed into a professional ensemble. In 1990 the orchestra gained a status of a full-time professional orchestra, and at that time the number of employed musicians was 12.

The past conductors of St. Michel Strings include Onni Kelo, whose efforts brought the city of Mikkeli an excellent Mikaeli Concert Hall, Tiitus Mäntynen and Eric-Olof Söderström. The orchestra has also collaborated with conductors José Serebrier, Leif Segerstam and Andres Mustonen. After being without a permanent conductor for more than 15 years the orchestra in April 2012 appointed Sasha Mäkilä their new Music Director.

Over the past years the orchestra has concentrated especially on repertoire for string orchestra, but several times a year St. Michel Strings joins forces with the other orchestras in the region (namely orchestras based in Lappeenranta, Kuopio and Jyväskylä) to be able to play symphonic concerts. The orchestra has recorded seven albums, most of them on Alba record label.

== Recordings ==
- Torelli, Mendelssohn, Sibelius, MIKOCD-1 (1993)
- St. Michel Strings in Poland with Tadeusz Wicherek, Alba ABCD 173 (2002)
- Segerstam Live Concert Recordings, HT-Intendent Oy HTINT 00001 (2005)
- Bloch & Busoni, Alba 6417513102345 (2007)
- MKO & Kauko Röyhkä: Zaia, Ranka Recordings RA 155-177722-3 (2008)
