= Fourth Dimension Records =

British record label

Fourth Dimension Records is a British record label, specialising in international underground music. It was founded by Gary Levermore as an offshoot of his Third Mind label before being taken over by Richard Johnson (aka Richo) in 1983. The label became quite successful in the 1990s, releasing music by Simon Wickham-Smith & Richard Youngs, KK Null, The Gerogerigegege, Circle, Splintered, Thurston Moore, Hijokaidan, and Merzbow, side projects by members of Amp and Skullflower and myriad 7" and 10" singles by experimental artists from the UK, US, New Zealand, the Netherlands and Japan. Alongside the label, Johnson also ran a mail order service, stocking rare underground releases from around the world.

Shortly before taking over the label, Johnson began editing a fanzine called Grim Humour, initially covering non-mainstream artists such as Big Black, Swans, Killing Joke, Lydia Lunch, Whitehouse and Sonic Youth. These often came with cassette or vinyl compilations (usually given FD catalogue numbers) with participants including the aforementioned Sonic Youth, Cindytalk, Ausgang, Con Demek and Portion Control. The fanzine ceased in the mid-1990s but Johnson has since launched a new title, Adverse Effect, which has been praised by Record Collector and Ptolemaic Terrascope, lasted four editions and now can be found as a blogspot and via the Fourth Dimension website.

Although Fourth Dimension was dormant for a short while in the late 1990s, it has since relaunched with further releases from Merzbow and Circle, as well as albums by Johnson's own project Theme, The Fields of Hay and British sound artist Andrew Liles. He has also begun a second label, Lumberton Trading Company, a joint venture initially started with Hassni Malik The Vitamin B12. It has issued a number of albums by artists including Experimental Audio Research, Theme, Thighpaulsandra, Human Greed and Michael Gira. More releases are also planned.

Besides the fact Fourth Dimension and Lumberton Trading Company continue to this day, Richard Johnson is still writing about music, is involved in the band Theme, plans to oversee a reissue campaign by his last group, Splintered and is working on a book devoted to his Grim Humour fanzine. Another book dedicated to Adverse Effect will then follow.
