= Katapult (album) =

Studio album by Circle
- Released: 2007
- Length: 38:55
- Label: No Quarter Records

Circle chronology
Panic (2007)	Katapult (2007)	The Blaze Game (2007)

Katapult is the twenty-seventh album by the Finnish experimental rock band Circle. It was released on CD and limited vinyl by No Quarter Records in 2007. The album has a clear black metal influence, displaying a fondness for the harsh guitars and rapid drums of bands such as Immortal and Celtic Frost. Despite this, the album is still very recognizable as Circle due to its insistence on repetition - a constant feature of the band's sound. The opening track, "Saturnus Reality", gives its name to a documentary film about the band.

== Track listing ==
1. "Saturnus Reality"
2. "Torpedo Star Throne"
3. "Black Black Never Never Land"
4. "Understanding New Age"
5. "Tree On The Higher Mountain"
6. "Four Points Of The Compass"
7. "Fish Reflection"
8. "Skeletor Highway"
9. "Snow Olympics"
