= Trensmat Records =

Irish record label

- Founded: 2006
- Founder: Whirling Hall Of Knives
- Defunct: 2015
- Status: not active
- Genre: Experimental, space rock, noise, drone
- Country of origin: Ireland
- Location: Trim, County Meath

Trensmat Records was an independent record label based in Ireland. It specialised in drone, noise music, krautrock and grooves. All releases were on vinyl in limited editions.

The label's name was a made up word, based on "transmit." Making up a word for the label name tied in with the "every noise has a note" tagline on earlier releases. Having a made-up word for the label name also made the label name appear sooner in Internet searches.

TR020, one of the label's releases, marked the end of the first phase of the label in which it had grown to be internationally distributed - a move away from its traditional method of small-run handmade editions sold directly to its mailing list and handful of shops. This phase nearly finished the label and it took 18 months out to rebuild and re-launched in 2011. That year saw it return to its original concept to great success with three sets of very well received 7"s.

Artists associated with the label include The Telescopes, Mugstar, AreaC, Magnetize, Heavy Winged, Circle, Astral Social Club, The Shining Path, Cave, Cheval Sombre, Mudhoney, Acid Mothers Temple, White Hills, Kinski, Bardo Pond, GNOD, Astral Social Club

== Discography ==
- The Telescopes - Night Terrors 7" (TR001) August 2006
- Mugstar - Bethany Heart Star 7" (TR002) February 2007
- The Telescopes - Psychic Viewfinder 7" (TR004) May 2007
- Area C - Trick with a Knife 7" (TR003) June 2007
- Magnetize - Noise to Signal 7" (TR005) July 2007
- Heavy Winged - On the Marble Cliffs 7" (TR006) August 2007
- Circle - Vaahto 7" (TR007) December 2007
- The Telescopes - Another Whip 7" (TR008) December 2007
- Astral Social Club - Skelp/Ginnel 7" (TR009) April 2008
- The Shining Path - Live at the Voltaire Commune 7" (TR010) April 2008
- Cave - Live at the Voltaire Commune 7" (TR011) April 2008
- Cheval Sombre - Live at the Voltaire Commune 7" (TR012) April 2008
- Mudhoney / Mugstar - Sonic Attack (Motorheads) 7" (TR013) November 2008
- Acid Mothers Temple & The Cosmic Inferno / White Hills - Sonic Attack (Psychedelic Warlords) 7" (TR014) November 2008
- Kinski / Bardo Pond - Sonic Attack (Lords of Light) 7" (TR015) November 2008
- Expo'70 - Sunglasses 7" (TR016) January 2009
- Black to Comm - Incidents 7" (TR017) January 2009
- Mugstar - Today Is the Wrong Shape 7" (TR018) August 2009
- Our Love will Destroy the World - Yellow Nirvana 7" (TR019) August 2009
- Various - Every Noise Has a Note CD LP (TR020) December 2009
- Astral Social Club - Snaefell 7" (TR021) April 2011
- Evan Caminiti - Distant Lights 7" (TR022) April 2011
- Ashtray Navigations - 3 Rockets Thicken 7" (TR023) August 2011
- White Hills - Measured Energy 7" (TR024) August 2011
- Carlton Melton / Mugstar - Company / Black Fountain 7" (TR025) December 2011
- Tlaotlon / Whirling Hall Of Knives - Attitudes Blankets To Nada / Synapse Snaps 7" (TR026) December 2011
- Tlaotlon - Squirt Image Flex LP (TR027) February 2012
- The Telescopes - Black Eyed Dog 7" (TR028) May 2012
- Cheval Sombre - Couldn't Do 7" (TR029) May 2012
- GNOD - 5th Sun 7" (TR030) July 2012
- Whirling Hall Of Knives - Alternate Devil 7" (TR031) July 2012
- Cloudland Canyon - Born Blonde 12" (TR032) November 2012
- A.M - Black Night Burning LP (TR033) December 2012
- GNOD - Presents.. Dwellings & Druss LP (TR034) February 2013
- The 15 Dead Minutes - Scheming Things 12" (TR035) April 2013
- Whirling Hall Of Knives - Devisions LP (TR036) 2013
- My Cat Is An Alien - Alien, All Too Alien LP (TR037) 2013
- Astral Social Club - Electric Yep LP (TR038) 2013
- Dwellings - Don't Say Nothing LP (TR039) 2013
- Stave - Trust 12" (TR040) 2013
- AM - Dragonfly LP (TR041) 2014
- Love Cult Take Druss - Yr Problems LP (TR042) 2014
- Stefan Jaworzyn - Principles Of Inertia LP (TR043) 2014
- Valved - AnD / WHOK Remixes 12" (TR044) 2014
- Sunil Sharpe - Cadya 12" (TR045) 2014

== See also ==
- List of record labels
