= Siluurikaudella =

Studio album by Pharaoh Overlord
- Released: 2010
- Length: 53:22
- Label: Ektro Records

Pharaoh Overlord chronology
Live In Suomi Finland (2007)	Siluurikaudella (2010)	Out Of Darkness (2011)

Siluurikaudella is the seventh album by Finnish experimental rock band Pharaoh Overlord.

It was released on CD in 2010 by Ektro Records. Its closest relative amongst Pharaoh Overlord's family tree is Doktor Kettu's Soft Delirium, another album featuring bassist Jussi Lehtisalo.

== Track list ==
1. Vesitorni (22:32)
2. Valujuhla (12:47)
3. Piirros 3 (18:03)

== Personnel ==
- Jussi Lehtisalo
- Tomi Leppänen
- Janne Westerlund
- Julius Jääskeläinen
- Pekka Jääskeläinen
