= Keuhkot =

Finnish musical group

- Origin: Finland
- Genres: Avantgarde, post-punk, industrial, antimusic
- Years active: 1988–present
- Labels: Stigma (1989–1990), Bad Vugum (1991–2000), Ektro Records (2002–present)
- Members: Kake Puhuu
- Past members: Olli Pauke, liimanarinaguitars (1989–1990); D.W. Ojala, drums, shouting (1989–1990)
- Website: ektrorecords.com/ektro.php?page=keuhkot

Keuhkot (English: Lungs) is a Finnish one man avantgarde band, whose only member is Kake Puhuu (aka Kalevi Rainio) from Pomarkku. Keuhkot started in 1988. Keuhkot's music has been described as post-punk, industrial or antimusic. Keuhkot concerts are performances in which Kake Puhuu may perform from large bird nest boxes or from lecterns.

== Discography ==
=== Albums ===
- Musiikkia konduktöörivaunuihin / Älä koskaan kuuntele musiikkia - LP (Something Weird, Islanti, 1995)

Keuhkot / Euroopan huonointa lapsipornografiaa / Jumala ei välitä / Virallinen valvoja / Nuori ja vihainen // Älä koskaan kuuntele musiikkia / Pääministeri muuttuu geometriseksi / Ensirakkaus / Tylsä & yksinäinen

- Mitä otat mukaan muistoksi sivistyksestä - LP/CD (Bad Vugum, 1996)

Hajusinfonia / Eliökunnan hierarkiamarssi / Johannes Täi - hyvä loinen / Tunnustettu / Ajattelen mahdollisuuksiani / Riemun oksennus // Irtiotto / Lohtu / Ihanneammatti / Tiputus / Kári Svanur
CD includes also EPs Lihaa y-akselilla olen oikeassa and latistaa totuudenetsinnän sanahelinäksi

- Ruskea aikakirja - CD (Bad Vugum, 1998)

Hauska nähdä teitä taas / Ensimmäiset vapaat vaalit / 24h risteily / Koonit / Helmihäät / Kuka meitä nyt suojelee, kun poliisitkin on ammuttu / Ehec World Tour 1998 / Konsultti / Vapaata kilpailua / Ruskea Aika / Parantaja Koo / Julkisen kuvan kiillotus / Jumala

- Minun käy sääliksi bilharzialoista - CD (Bad Vugum, 2000)

Epäjumala kohottaa kasvonsa / Uuskiiman ihana väristys / Lentävät kivet / Kirja / Raiteet ristissä / Ajatus / Tulosopimusneuvottelu / Surkea esitys / Häntä / Etelänlomalla / Bilharzia / Huipulla

- Peruskivi Francon betonia - CD (Ektro Records, 2002)

Pois Zagorasta / Syksyn kirjasatoa / Maankäyttö: Suunnittelu & Toteutus / Seitsemän manipuloitua veljestä / Puhumatta paras / Helsingin jätevedet / Kauppaa teroituslaitteesta / Lomasuomi / Nollalukulaiset / Francon betonia / Kaste

- Toimintatapoja olioille - CD (Ektro Records, 2005)

Presentaatio Raumanjuovassa / Ilmastonmuutos / Peshawar-Kandahar-Espoo-Köbenhavn / Muistikortti / Seuraan Leijonaa / Yhteiselle taipaleelle / Amir kätkee aseet nopeimmin / Kääntäkää kivetkin / Vastuu / Hiljainen hetki uhrien muistolle (One-minute Silence For the Victims) / EVA / Datametsa / Takaisin Raumanjuopaan

=== EPs ===
- Musiikkia konduktöörivaunuihin - 7-inch EP (Stigma, 1989)

Keuhkot / Euroopan huonointa lapsipornografiaa // Jumala ei välitä / Virallinen valvoja

- Älä koskaan kuuntele musiikkia - 7-inch EP (Stigma, 1990)

Älä koskaan kuuntele musiikkia / Pääministeri muuttuu geometriseksi // Ensirakkaus / Tylsä & yksinäinen

- Lihaa y-akselilla olen oikeassa - 7-inch EP (Bad Vugum, 1991)

Älä koskaan kuuntele ihmisiä / Hohtimet & jakoavain // Aikaani edellä / Lihaa y-akselilla

- Keuhkot latistaa totuudenetsinnän sanahelinäksi - 7-inch EP (Bad Vugum, 1993)

Huonot jumalat / Siitinjulistus // Rakkaus rinnassa / Katatoninen sankari / Lisääntyminen

- Vasen ja oikea - CD-EP (Bad Vugum, 1997)

Vihdoinkin ei ketään / Höpsisskepsis / Vuoden kuollut mies / Vuoden kuollut nainen / Olen tässä / Vasen ja oikea

=== Compilations featuring Keuhkot ===
- Maanalainen vuosikerta 1989 - LP (Stigma, 1989)

Keuhkot: Nuori ja vihainen

- Mykistäviä välikohtauksia: Ovelamman musiikin kokoelma - LP/CD (Bad Vugum, 1993)

Keuhkot: Kiihkoilijan masentava iltapäivä / Poliisia ei arvosteta, mutta sehän onkin jo klisee / Liikaa järkee

- B.V.O.D.: pre-millennium Bad Vugum - CD (Bad Vugum, 1999)

Keuhkot: Ihanneammatti / 24h Risteily

- Avanto 2001 - CD (Avanto Records, 2001)

Keuhkot: Käynnistys on suuri hetki

- Cabaret nocturno vol. III - CD (Zerga, 2002)

Keuhkot: Naisia sementtiin (1988)
