= Circle (Finnish band) =

Finnish experimental rock band

Background information
- Origin: Pori, Finland
- Genres: Experimental rock
- Years active: 1991–present
- Labels: Ektro; No Quarter; Bad Vugum
- Members: Jussi Lehtisalo; Mika Rättö; Janne Westerlund; Tomi Leppänen; Julius Jääskeläinen; Pekka Jääskeläinen; Tuomas Laurila
- Past members: Olli Joukio; Teemu Korpipää; Jyrki Laiho; Jani Viitanen; Teemu Elo; Janne Peltomäki; Janne Tuomi; Bruce Duff

Circle is a Finnish experimental rock band formed in Pori in 1991. Their eclectic, ever-changing style has been associated with genres such as krautrock, heavy metal, progressive rock, and ambient. On some albums they have defined themselves as New Wave of Finnish Heavy Metal (NWOFHM).

== Biography ==
Circle was formed in 1992 by bassist and singer Jussi Lehtisalo, the only member who has been in the band throughout its career. Circle's krautrock-style debut album Meronia was released in 1994 and featured lyrics in a made-up language. A trio of albums, Andexelt (1999), Prospekt (2000), and Taantumus (2001), brought them international attention. Since recording 2002's Sunrise, the core line-up has consisted of Lehtisalo with keyboard player and singer Mika Rättö, drummer Tomi Leppänen, and guitarist Janne Westerlund, playing more heavy metal-oriented music though continuously influenced by krautrock band Faust. Since 2009, Julius Jääskeläinen and Pekka Jääskeläinen have appeared on all recordings by the band. Sound engineer and musician/composer Tuomas Laurila is also credited as a member of the band on a number of releases.

Circle member have participated in a great number of side projects and split-offs, including stoner rock spin-off Pharaoh Overlord. Rättö and Lehtisalo play as a duo, Rättö ja Lehtisalo, and as a trio with Kauko Röyhkä. Other projects featuring members of Circle include Steel Mammoth, Ektroverde, Janne Westerlund's Plain Ride, Lusiferiinin Armosta, K-X-P, Aavikko, Lehtisalofamily, Split Cranium Moon Fog Prophet, and Doktor Kettu.

Whilst recording the album Miljard in 2006 the band was filmed by Esko Lönnberg, and the resulting movie, Saturnus Reality released as a DVD, by No Quarter Records (2007). Lönnberg's attempt to make the film itself became the subject of another movie, The Man With The Video Camera, filmed by Petri Hagner, which has also been released as a DVD by Fonal Records (2010). The band are also closely associated with the filmmaker Mika Taanila: in 2011, they provided a live soundtrack to his 1998 silent film Pori (released as an album, Suur-Pori); and in 2012 recorded several new tracks for Six Day Run, also released subsequently as an album.

In 2011, Circle/Pharaoh Overlord were artists-in-residence at Dutch rock festival Roadburn Festival. The group made its 32nd full-length album, Terminal, available for streaming on SoundCloud shortly before its official release on Southern Lord Records on 23 June 2017.

In November 2021, Circle released Henki, a collaborative album made with English musician Richard Dawson, on Weird World (an imprint of Domino Recording Company).

== Discography ==
=== Albums ===
- 1994 Meronia, CD/2LP (Bad Vugum), 2007 CD re-issue (Ektro Records)
- 1996 Zopalki, CD/2LP (Bad Vugum), 2012 CD re-issue (Ektro Records)
- 1996 Hissi, CD (Metamorphos / Captain Trip Records (Japan))
- 1997 Fraten, CD (Metamorphos)
- 1998 Pori, CD (Metamorphos), 2000 CD (Feldspar (USA))
- 1999 Andexelt, CD (Metamorphos), 2000 CD (tUMULt)
- 2000 Prospekt CD (Ektro Records), 2002 2LP (Static Resonance)
- 2001 Taantumus, CD (Bad Vugum)
- 2002 Sunrise, CD (Ektro Records), 2006 2LP (Headspin)
- 2002 Alotus, CD (Klangbad)
- 2003 Guillotine, CD (Ektro Records), 2005 CD (Scratch)
- 2004 Forest, CD (Ektro Records), 2005 CD (No Quarter)
- 2005 Tulikoira, CD (Ektro Records), 2007 2LP + 7" (Headspin)
- 2006 Miljard, 2CD (Ektro Records)
- 2006 Tyrant, CD (Latitudes)
- 2007 Panic, CD (Ektro Records)
- 2007 Katapult, CD/LP (No Quarter)
- 2008 Hollywood, CD/2LP (Ektro Records)
- 2010 Rautatie, CD (Ektro Records)
- 2011 Infektio, CD/LP (Conspiracy Records)
- 2011 Noiduttu, MC (Ruton Music)
- 2012 Manner, LP (Hydra Head Records)
- 2013 Incarnation, CD/LP (Ektro Records)
- 2013 Frontier, as "Falcon (ex-Circle)", CD/LP (Ektro Records)
- 2014 Leviatan, as "Circle (ex-Falcon)", CD/LP (Ektro Records)
- 2015 Pharaoh Overlord, CD/LP (Ektro Records)
- 2017 Terminal, CD/LP (Southern Lord Records)
- 2024 Muurahaiset

=== Live albums ===
- 1998 Surface, split w. Marble Sheep, CD (Metamorphos / Captain Trip Records (Japan))
- 2001 Raunio, CD (Ektro Records), 2002 CD (Squealer Music)
- 2004 Golem / Vesiliirto, 2LP (Kevyt Nostalgia / Super Metsä)
- 2004 Empire, LP (Riot Season)
- 2004 Mountain, LP (Kevyt Nostalgia / Super Metsä)
- 2005 General, LP (Kevyt Nostalgia / Super Metsä)
- 2006 Arkades, LP (Fourth Dimension Records), 2007 2CD (Fourth Dimension Records)
- 2007 The Blaze Game, as "Sunburned Circle" with Sunburned Hand of the Man, CD/LP (Conspiracy)
- 2007 Telescope, 2CD (Sunhair) Recorded in 2003
- 2007 Rakennus, CD (Ektro Records)
- 2008 Triumph, 2LP (Fourth Dimension Records) Recorded in 2007
- 2009 Soundcheck, LP (Full Contact)
- 2011 Maxim, LP (Full Contact)
- 2012 Serpent, CD (Ektro Records)
- 2014 Hukkaamiskielto, MC (Ruton Music)
- 2014 6000 km/h, LP (Full Contact)

=== Compilations ===
- 1998 Kollekt, compilation CD (Bad Vugum)

=== Collaborations ===
- 2007 Tower feat. Verde, CD (Last Visible Dog)
- 2011 Rakkaus tulessa feat. Erkki Kurenniemi, LP (Full Contact)
- 2011 Giardino feat. Verde, MC (Ruton Music)
- 2013 Enharmonic Intervals (For Paschen Organ), with Mamiffer, CD/LP (Ektro Records)
- 2021 Henki with Richard Dawson, CD/2LP, (Weird World/Domino)

=== Soundtrack albums ===
- 2013 Suur-Pori, MC (Ruton Music)
- 2013 Six Day Run, LP (Ektro Records)
- 2014 SSEENNSSEESS, CD/LP, (Ektro Records)

=== EPs - 7" ===
- 1991 DNA, 7" (Seventh Seal)
- 1992 Point, 7" (Bad Vugum)
- 1993 Silver, 7" (Bad Vugum)
- 1993 Crawatt, 7" (VHF Records)
- 1995 Ghatarian, 7" (Fourth Dimension Records)
- 1996 Kitin, split w. Psychoplasma, 7" (Metamorphos)
- 1998 Valas, split w. DisCo., 7" (Zerga)
- 2002 Tour, split with Acid Mothers Temple, 7" (Verdura)
- 2003 Elcric, 7" (Fonal Records)
- 2006 Earthworm, CDEP (No Quarter)
- 2006 Void Star, 7" (DotDotDot)
- 2007 Vaahto, 7" (Trensmat Records)
- 2009 Odottamaton, 7" (Sub Pop)
- 2011 Mylläri, 7" (Svart Records)
- 2012 End of Time/God Told Me To, 7" (Ektro Records) (Cover versions of two songs by Jesters of Destiny)
- 2013 Beer and Ribs, as "Falcon (ex-Circle)", 7" (Full Contact)
- 2014 Kumiluoti, 7" (Full Contact)
- 2017 Kummitus, 7" (Full Contact)

=== Compilation appearances ===
- 1995 Yllättäviä kohtaamisia / Surprising Encounters, LP/CD, (Bad Vugum) (Features the Circle tracks "Öja" and "Surrounding")
- 1998 MetaZoon, CD, (Metamorphos) (Features the Circle tracks "Friitalan Nahka" and a cover version of King Crimson's song "The Talking Drum")
- 2000 Tuonen Tytär - A Tribute to Finnish Progressive, CD, Mellow Records (Features a cover version of Haikara's song "Kun Menet Tarpeeksi Kauas Tulevaisuuteen, Huomaat Olevasi Menneisyydessä")
- 2002 Klangbad First Steps, CD, (Klangbad) (Features the Circle tracks "Scotch" and "Northern Sky")
- 2003 Painted Black, CD, (tUMULt) (Features a cover version of The Rolling Stones' song "Paint It Black")
- 2006 Innature, CD, (Barge Recordings) (Features the Circle track "No Battle, No Fire")
- 2006 SuperSonic 06, CD, (Capsule) (Features the Circle track "Nöyrä Ninja")
- 2008 Like Black Holes in the Sky: A Tribute to Syd Barrett, CD, (Dwell Records) (Features a cover version of Syd Barrett's song "Rats")
- 2009 Every Noise Has a Note, CD, (Trensmat Records) (Features the Circle track "Vaahto")
