= Tommi Välimaa =

Finnish ice hockey player

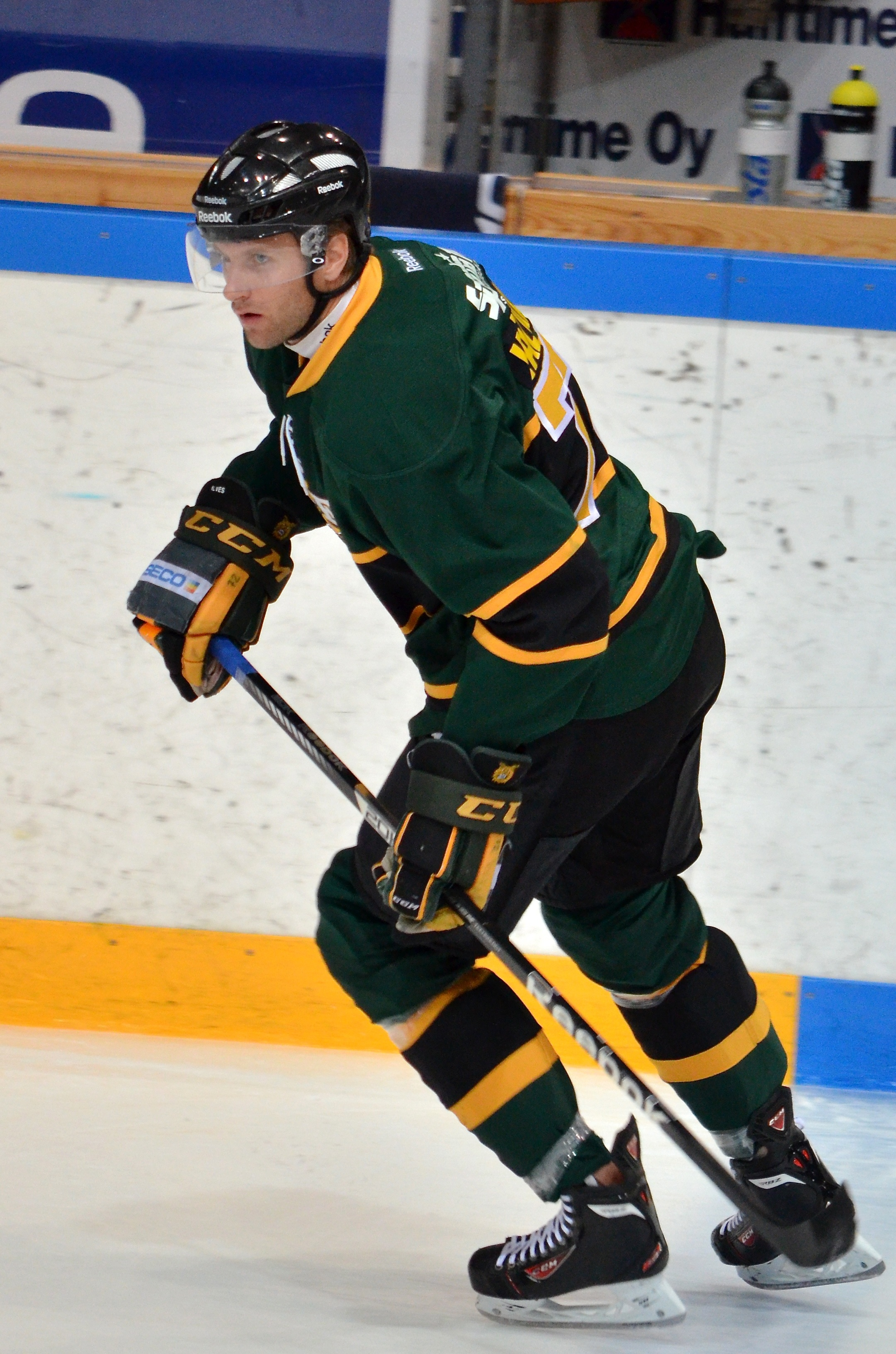
- Välimaa Tommi Ilves in 2013
- Born: January 20, 1984 (age 42) Kangasala, Finland
- Height: 6 ft 5 in (196 cm)
- Weight: 194 lb (88 kg; 13 st 12 lb)
- Position: Left wing
- Shot: Left
- Played for: HC Eagles; FPS; Koovee; LeKi; Ilves; Oulun Kärpät
- NHL draft: Undrafted
- Playing career: 2005–2020

Tommi Välimaa (born January 20, 1984) is a Finnish professional ice hockey forward. He is currently playing with Ilves in the Finnish Liiga.

Välimaa made his SM-liiga debut playing with Ilves during the 2010–11 SM-liiga season.

== Career statistics ==
			Regular season					Playoffs
Season	Team	League	GP	G	A	Pts	PIM	GP	G	A	Pts	PIM
2001–02	HC Eagles	2. Divisioona	4	2	0	2	2	—	—	—	—	—
2002–03	HC Eagles	2. Divisioona	22	18	17	35	71	—	—	—	—	—
2003–04	Ilves U20	U20 SM-liiga	29	7	5	12	47	—	—	—	—	—
2004–05	Ilves U20	U20 SM-liiga	20	5	3	8	20	9	2	3	5	12
2005–06	FPS	Mestis	43	12	7	19	86	—	—	—	—	—
2006–07	Koovee	Mestis	42	7	15	22	127	—	—	—	—	—
2007–08	LeKi	Mestis	45	15	12	27	62	3	1	0	1	16
2008–09	LeKi	Mestis	39	8	3	11	65	3	0	0	0	25
2009–10	LeKi	Mestis	41	4	12	16	75	8	0	3	3	33
2010–11	Ilves	SM-liiga	35	3	5	8	40	1	0	0	0	0
2010–11	LeKi	Mestis	17	6	6	12	12	—	—	—	—	—
2011–12	LeKi	Mestis	4	2	1	3	2	—	—	—	—	—
2011–12	Ilves	SM-liiga	49	2	3	5	46	—	—	—	—	—
2012–13	Ilves	SM-liiga	49	5	4	9	76	—	—	—	—	—
2012–13	LeKi	Mestis	5	0	1	1	54	—	—	—	—	—
2013–14	Ilves	Liiga	51	3	4	7	26	—	—	—	—	—
2014–15	Ilves	Liiga	41	3	7	10	24	2	0	0	0	2
2015–16	Ilves	Liiga	43	3	5	8	20	—	—	—	—	—
2015–16	LeKi	Mestis	4	0	0	0	32	—	—	—	—	—
2016–17	LeKi	Mestis	27	5	6	11	82	—	—	—	—	—
2016–17	Oulun Kärpät	Liiga	9	0	0	0	8	—	—	—	—	—
2017–18	LeKi	Mestis	48	8	11	19	61	5	0	1	1	4
2018–19	LeKi	Mestis	41	7	21	28	67	13	5	6	11	30
2019–20	LeKi	2. Divisioona	11	5	13	18	14	5	1	5	6	2
Liiga totals			277	19	28	47	240	3	0	0	0	2
Mestis totals			356	74	95	169	725	32	6	10	16	108
