= Jesters of Destiny =

Los Angeles metal band formed 1984

- Origin: Los Angeles, California, United States
- Genres: Heavy metal, hard rock, psychedelic rock, alternative metal
- Years active: 1984–1988, 2014–present
- Label: Dimension

Jesters of Destiny is an American heavy metal band from Los Angeles, California, which was formed in 1984 by Bruce Duff (bass/vocals, who had been booted from 45 Grave earlier in the year) and Ray Violet who had worked with The Dickies, Mentors, God Lives Underwater, Rozz Williams, Smokey Robinson, Bloods and Crips, EXP, and lots of down and out strippers. Evolving from a recording project spearheaded by Violet, who was working as senior engineer for Dawnbreaker studio in San Fernando, CA (previously owned by Seals and Crofts), the band recorded what would be the first two Jesters songs during the project, which was instigated in order to come up with commercial jingles. The songs were "Diggin' That Grave" and "End of Time." The band presented the songs to Metal Blade Records, who included "End of Time" on Metal Massacre V collection. It closed the LP, which include early tracks by Overkill, Fates Warning, Voivod and Metal Church. The band then signed to Metal Blade, but due to the band not being strictly heavy metal, the label created a subsidiary, Dimension Records, which released the band's debut album, Fun at the Funeral, in 1986, and an EP, In a Nostalgic Mood, in 1987, during their first tenure. Following ",,,Mood," Metal Blade dropped the band. They demo-ed a number of songs for a planned third LP to be titled, No Laughing Matter, but were unable to land a new recording contract. They broke up in 1988. During their run, a number of lead guitarists and drummers were part of the band, including on drums, David Buzzelli (Doktor Stixx), Louie Schilling, Wailin' Jennings Morgan (ex-London), Dave Kuzma, Blaze; and on guitar, Sickie Wifebeater, Michael Montano and Brian Butler.

in 2001, Ektro Records in Finland reissued Fun at the Funeral, supplemented with bonus tracks which combined live recordings with most of the demos for No Laughing Matter. Ektro owner and Circle bassist Jussi Lehtisalo asked Duff to guest on a Circle EP, Earthworm (2006), and later a full LP Hollywood (2009). In 2011, Duff joined Circle for an artist residency at the Roadburn festival in Tilburg, Netherlands, fronting the band and singing a combination of Circle and Jesters songs. Circle then issued a single of Jesters songs "End of Time" and "God Told Me To" with both Duff and Violet joining on the recording. Duff and Violet reformed the Jesters in 2014 after their debut album was re-released on vinyl by Full Contact, Ektro's vinyl subsidiary. Ektro/Full Contact released their second album, The Sorrows That Refuse to Drown, on April 7, 2017.

== Musical style ==
The band combined heavy metal, pop and psychedelic rock. Eduardo Rivadavia of Allmusic described the band's sound as "upbeat" and wrote "CA's Jesters of Destiny confused way too many people to make much of a name for themselves during their brief run through the mid-'80s. If only they'd emerged a decade later, when the convenient label of "alternative metal" was generously bandied about to everyone from Jane's Addiction to Faith No More, the band might have had better luck."

== Discography ==
Studio albums

- Fun at the Funeral (1986)
- The Sorrows That Refuse to Drown (2017)
- Distorting Everything (2022)
- Drop Dead Rockin/Jesters 88 (2024)

EPs

- In a Nostalgic Mood (1987)

== Other sources ==
- Spotlight On Local: Bruce Duff Gives Us Rock From Behind The Scenes To Center Stage
- Premiere + Track By Track: Jesters of Destiny - 'In A Nostalgic Mood'
- brushing mention
- POP MUSIC : Headbangers' Haven : L.A. Plays Host to a New Generation of Glam and Speed-Metal Bands
