= Prospekt (album) =

Studio album by Circle
- Released: September 2000
- Length: 49:54
- Label: Ektro Records

Circle chronology
Andexelt (1999)	Prospekt (2000)	Taantumus (2001)

Prospekt is the ninth album by the Finnish experimental rock band Circle, first released on CD in 2000 by Ektro Records. It was re-released as a double LP by Static Resonance in 2002. The D-side of the re-issue contains the live track "Työläisten laulu" from a show at Jyväskylä, Finland, on September 11, 2001. It was re-issued again as a CD in 2011 by the Brazilian label Essence Records, including the extra track, and presented in a gatefold sleeve replicating the vinyl version in miniature.

Overall, the album has a tight krautrock sound that shows heavy influence from both Can and Neu!. Drawing largely on long improvisations centered on a single riff or chord progression, the songs have an expansive progressive rock sound as well, often going past ten minutes, like "Aarre" and "Eripwre". According to The Quietus, Prospekt (along with Taantumus and Andexelt), helped bring the band to wider international audiences. AllMusic scored the album four out of five stars. Dave Brock from the pioneering space-rock band Hawkwind has cited Prospekt as one of his favorite albums.

== Track listing ==
1. "Dedofiktion" (8:22)
2. "Gericht" (6:45)
3. "Stimulance" (6:53)
4. "Varhain" (6:55)
5. "Aarre" (10:17)
6. "Eripwre" (10:33)
7. "Työläisten laulu (Encore Apocalypse Mix)" (17:40)

== Personnel ==
- Teemu Elo
- Pike Kontkanen
- Jyrki Laiho
- Jussi Lehtisalo
- Tomi Leppänen
- Teemu Niemelä
- Janne Peltomäki
- Mika Rättö
- Markku Peltola
- Mika Rintala
