= Pacius =

Pacius is a surname. Notable people with the name include:

- Fredrik Pacius (1809–1891), German–Finnish composer
- Julius Pacius (1550–1635), also known as Giulio Pace, Italian scholar and jurist
- Woobens Pacius (born 2001), Canadian soccer player
- Yngve Pacius (1886–1962), Finnish sailor
