= Steel Mammoth =

Finnish metal band

Steel Mammoth is a Finnish metal band. They have released eight albums.

== Discography ==
- Nuclear Barbarians (EP, 2007)
- Atomic Mountain (2007)
- The Kingdom of the Golden Hammer (2008)
- Nuclear Ritual (2009)
- Radiation Funeral (2011)
- Nuclear Rebirth (2011)
- Atomic Oblivion (2017)
- Electronic Dreams (2021)
- Shadow Diamond (2024)

== Members ==
The front figure in Steel Mammoth was Jussi Lehtisalo. Lehtisalo and drummer Samae Koskinen also played in the crust punk band Split Cranium.

Ville Pirinen also had several projects including Garfield Steel and Ville Pirinen Combat School.
