= Hissi, Selu =

Village in Maharashtra

Hissi is a village in the tehsil/mandal of Selu in the Parbhani district of Maharashtra state of India. There are no other villages under the village panchayat of Hissi.
