= Pharaoh Overlord =

Finnish experimental rock music band

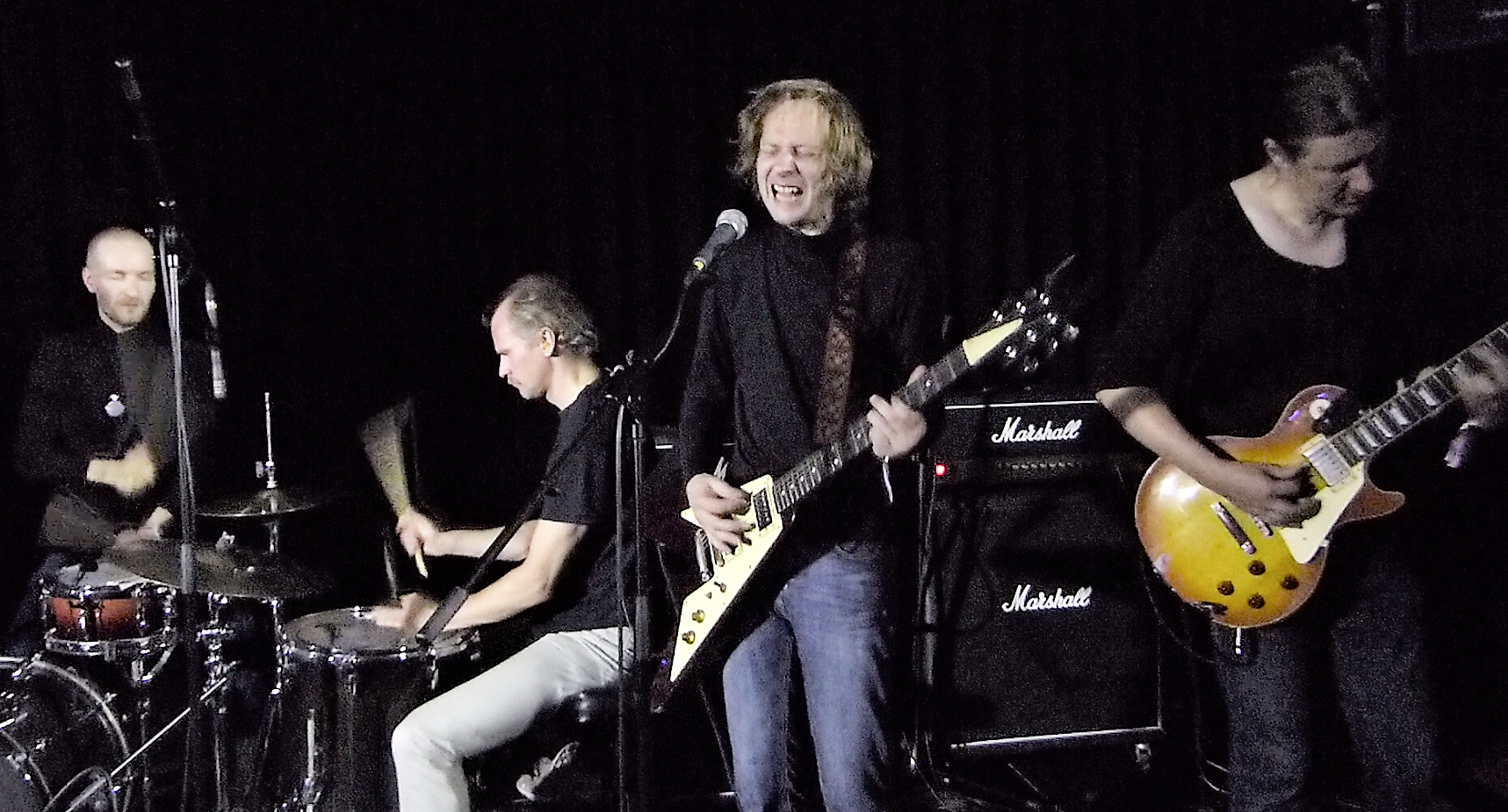

Background information
- Origin: Pori, Finland
- Genres: Stoner rock; krautrock; experimental; avant rock; heavy metal; speed metal
- Years active: 2000–present
- Labels: Ektro Records; No Quarter Records; Last Visible Dog; Riot Season; Vivo Records
- Members: Jussi Lehtisalo; Janne Westerlund; Tomi Leppänen; Julius Jääskeläinen; Pekka Jääskeläinen
- Website: Label website

Pharaoh Overlord is an experimental rock music band, initially featuring three members of the Finnish group Circle, Jussi Lehtisalo, Janne Westerlund and Tomi Leppänen. Originally begun as a vehicle to indulge their love of stoner rock, Pharaoh Overlord's output has become more varied, mirroring the development of their sister group. Their 2007 album Live In Suomi Finland features contributions from krautrock pioneer Hans Joachim Irmler. Julius Jääskeläinen and Pekka Jääskeläinen also appear on that recording, and have played regularly with the band since both in performance and in the studio. Since the 2019 release 5, the band has been a duo consisting of Lehtisalo and Leppänen. The 2020 album 6 also features vocals by Aaron Turner.

In September 2010, it was announced that Circle/Pharaoh Overlord would be performing the role of artists-in-residence at Dutch rock festival Roadburn Festival 2011.

The band released the album Louhi on 25 July 2025 through Rocket Recordings. They stated the origin of the album title and theme comes from the Finnish language where "bitcoin mining is called "Louhinta". The same word is used for describing someone playing extremely heavy riffs on guitar." It was described as "weaponized phlegm and stoner-kosmische" by The Quietus. This was due to the combination of the hurdy gurdy creating a "drone that matches the heaviest guitars with ease" and the "growl vocals" of guest vocalist and tattooist Aaron Turner.

== Discography ==
- 2000: Pharaoh Overlord #1, CD (Ektro Records)
- 2003: Pharaoh Overlord #2, CD (No Quarter Records)
- 2004: The Battle Of The Axehammer, CD (Last Visible Dog)
- 2004: Pharaoh Overlord #3, CD (Riot Season)
- 2005: Pharaoh Overlord 4, CD (Ektro Records)
- 2007: Live In Suomi Finland, CD (Vivo Records)
- 2010: Siluurikaudella, CD (Ektro Records)
- 2011: Out Of Darkness, CD (Ektro Records)
- 2011: Horn, LP (Svart Records / Full Contact)
- 2012: Lunar Jetman, CD/LP (Ektro Records)
- 2012: Black Tar Prophecies Vol. 5/ Palmu, LP (Kemado Records)
- 2014: Överhörn, MC (Ruton Music)
- 2014: 6000 km/h, LP (Full Contact Records)
- 2015: Circle, CD/LP (Ektro Records)
- 2018: Zero (Ektro Records)
- 2019: 5 (Ektro Records)
- 2020: 6 (Rocket Recordings)
- 2025: Louhi (Rocket Recordings)
