= Kauko Röyhkä =

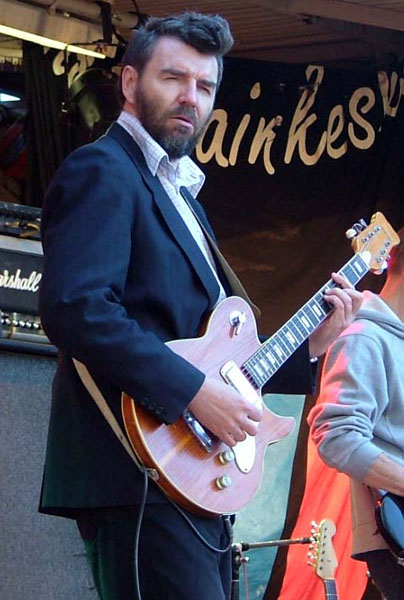
- Kauko Röyhkä in Helsinki (2004)

Background information
- Born: Jukka-Pekka Välimaa; 12 February 1959 (age 67)
- Occupations: Singer, songwriter, writer
- Years active: 1980–present
- Labels: EMI, Kerberos, Johanna, Euros Records, Herodes, Ranka Recordings, Ektro Records

Kauko Röyhkä (born Jukka-Pekka Välimaa, 12 February 1959, Valkeakoski) is a Finnish rock musician, author and screenwriter. Since the early 1980s he has been a popular rock artist in Finland known especially as a strong lyricist.

Röyhkä lived his youth in Oulu and has later lived in Turku and Helsinki. His recording career began in 1980 with the debut album Steppaillen. To date he has recorded 23 full-length albums. His most famous backing band has been Narttu ("Bitch"), that was together in various line-ups throughout the years 1980–1990. Röyhkä has also had many side projects, including a band called 500 kg lihaa ("500 kg of Meat"). In 2007 Röyhkä performed his songs with the Mikkeli town string orchestra.

Röyhkä has studied literature and has been praised for his lyrics, especially during the late 1980s. Röyhkä is a singer and guitarist, and has said that, after realizing that he couldn't learn to play like his idols, he wanted to create his own style of playing. In public Röyhkä has been a slightly provocative figure. He managed to raise some fuss in the early 1990s by claiming to be satanist (later he explained that the statement was just an experiment with publicity). Some of the most well known songs by Röyhkä include "Lauralle", "Talo Meren Rannalla", "Paska Kaupunki" and "Paha Maa". The albums Maa on voimaa and Pikku enkeli found their way onto Soundi magazine's list of the alltime 50 greatest Finnish popular music albums.

Röyhkä began publishing books in the same year as his debut album appeared in 1980. Originally he wanted to be an author rather than musician. Röyhkä has written ten novels or short story collections and some other works including the biography of Finnish porn star Henry Saari and a book about Velvet Underground. He has also written columns for the newspaper Kaleva and record reviews for Rytmi magazine, and been a screenwriter in four films.

== Discography ==
=== Albums ===
- Steppaillen (EMI, 1980)
- Uusia tansseja (EMI/Parlophone, 1981)
- Mikki Hiiren myöhemmät vaiheet (Kerberos, 1982)
- Onnenpäivä (Euros, 1983)
- Lauralle (Euros, 1984)
- Maa on voimaa (Euros, 1985)
- Pikku enkeli (Euros, 1986)
- Mielummin vanha kuin aikuinen (Euros, 1987)
- Ihmelapsi (Euros, 1988)
- Joko-tai (Euros, 1990)
- Kaksi koiraa (Euros, 1990)
- Tyttöjen ystävä (Herodes, 1991)
- Olennainen välittyy (Euros, 1992) (live)
- Jumalan lahja (EMI/Herodes, 1993)
- Kaunis eläin (EMI/Herodes, 1994)
- Akti (EMI/Herodes, 1995)
- Sinä olet tähti (Ranka, 1997)
- Puiden alle (Ranka, 1998)
- Rock'n'roll-klisee (Ranka, 1999)
- Miss Farkku-Suomi (Ranka, 2001)
- Etsijät (Ranka, 2002)
- Elämä ja Kuolema (Ranka, 2005)
- Kauko Röyhkä & Riku Mattila (Ranka, 2008)
- Zaia (with St. Michel Strings) (Ranka, 2008)
- Hiekkarantaa (with krautrock-duo Rättö ja Lehtisalo) (Ektro Records, 2009)
- Pois Valoista - Live 2012 (with Narttu) (Svart Records, 2013)
- Etelän Peto (Svart Records/supersounds, 2014)
- Turmion Suurherttua (Svart Records, 2017)

=== EPs ===
- Paha maa (Euros, 1988)
- Mutta, mutta (Euros, 1989)

=== Collections ===
- Bossanova 80 – 82 (1982)
- Kulta-aika (1986)
- Extra (1988)
- Lauluja rakastamisen vaikeudesta (1989)
- Olen Messias (1992)
- Talo meren rannalla (1996)
- Pohjoinen taivas (1997)
- 20 suosikkia – Lauralle (1998)
- Räyhähenki muistelee – Kokoelma 1980-2000 (2000)
- Pohjoinen taivas Osa 2 (2000)
- 20 suosikkia – Talo meren rannalla (2002)
- Selkäranka 1996-2004 (2004)
- Lauluntekijä (2006)
- Olen Messias - Valitut Palat 1980–2012 (2012)

=== Singles ===
- Yhdeltä viimeistään pois go-go / Dora (1980)
- Steppaillen / Ihmisen paras ystävä (1980)
- Uusia tansseja / Astraalitasolla (1981)
- Preerian kuu / Miljoonapulu (1982)
- Herra presidentti / Viiltäjä / Kun olin kuollut (1983)
- Onnellinen laiva / Majuri Thompson (1983)
- Lauralle / Annina (1984)
- Maa on voimaa / Me (1985)
- Paska kaupunki / Kovat pojat / Tuhlausta (1986)
- Pikku enkeli / Laulujen nainen (1986)
- Ennen olin kokonaan toinen / Kolme asetelmaa (1987)
- Matkustaa / Mainostaulujen taakse (1987)
- Majavalakki / Paha maa (1988)
- Tuntemattomalle / Crescendo (1988)
- Tulit vastaan mua / Eno ja hänen omatuntonsa (1989)
- Soita se taas, Rainer / Humalassa (1990)
- Kevät / Hän toiselta puolelta (1991)
- 80-luvun absurdismi / Kuuntele mua / Näin on käynyt monta kertaa (1992)
- Kultainen aasi / Noita (1993)
- Pohjoinen taivas / Oikea asenne (1993)
- Helena / Nuo keskellä olevat / Rauno rokkaa (1994)
- Pyhä kaupunki / Mies jolla on maine (1994)
- Tuon sulle Alfredo Garcian pään / Virheet (1997)
- Sinä teit sen taas, Marjaana (1998)
- Hipit vanhemmat (1998)
- Kauniit pelastetaan (1999)
- Rock'n'roll-klisee (1999)
- Disko-Datsun / Pitkätukkainen poika / Mimio (2001)
- Pauliina, rantatyttö / Melankolia (2002)

== Bibliography ==
=== Fiction ===
- Tien laidalla Waterloo (Weilin+Göös, 1980)
- Aave joka maalasi taulun (Weilin+Göös, 1982)
- Oskar Koposen seikkailut (Weilin+Göös, 1985)
- Magneetti (Weilin+Göös, 1987)
- Kaksi aurinkoa (Like, 1996)
- Silvia (Like, 1997)
- Ocean City (Like, 1999)
- Faust ja muita kertomuksia (Like, 2001) (novellikokoelma)
- Miss Farkku-Suomi (Like, 2003)
- Henry ja minä (Like, 2004)
- Avec (Like, 2006)
- Job (Like, 2007)
- Kesä Kannaksella (Like, 2009)
- Kreikkalainen salaatti (Like, 2011)
- Poika Mancini (Like, 2013)

=== Others ===
- Get On – 101 rocklyriikan parasta (toim. Röyhkä) (Tammi (kirjankustantamo)|Tammi, 2000)
- Kauko Röyhkä & Timo Vikkula: Nuottikirja (Like, 2004)
- Suursaari (Johnny Kniga, 2009)
- Rajantakainen Karjala (Johnny Kniga, 2011)

=== With others ===
"Röyhkä, Kauko & Haapasalo, Ville": "Et kuitenkaan usko...", Ville Haapasalon varhaisvuodet Venäjällä. (Docendo, 2013) "Röyhkä, Kauko & Haapasalo, Ville": "Et muuten tätäkään usko...", Ville Haapasalon 2000-luku Venäjällä, (Docendo, 2014) "Röyhkä, Kauko & Alizad, Arman": Armanin maailma (Docendo, 2014)

== Filmography ==
Röyhkä has been a screenwriter in four films:

- Tien laidalla Waterloo (1983), director and screenwriter
- Lapinpoika (1999), with Joona Tena
- Onnellisten laiva, with Joona Tena and Leo Viirret (2004)
- The Life of Aleksis Kivi (2002), with Jari Halonen and Jorma Tommila, uncredited
