= Janne Westerlund =

Finnish musician, songwriter and visual artist (born 1973)

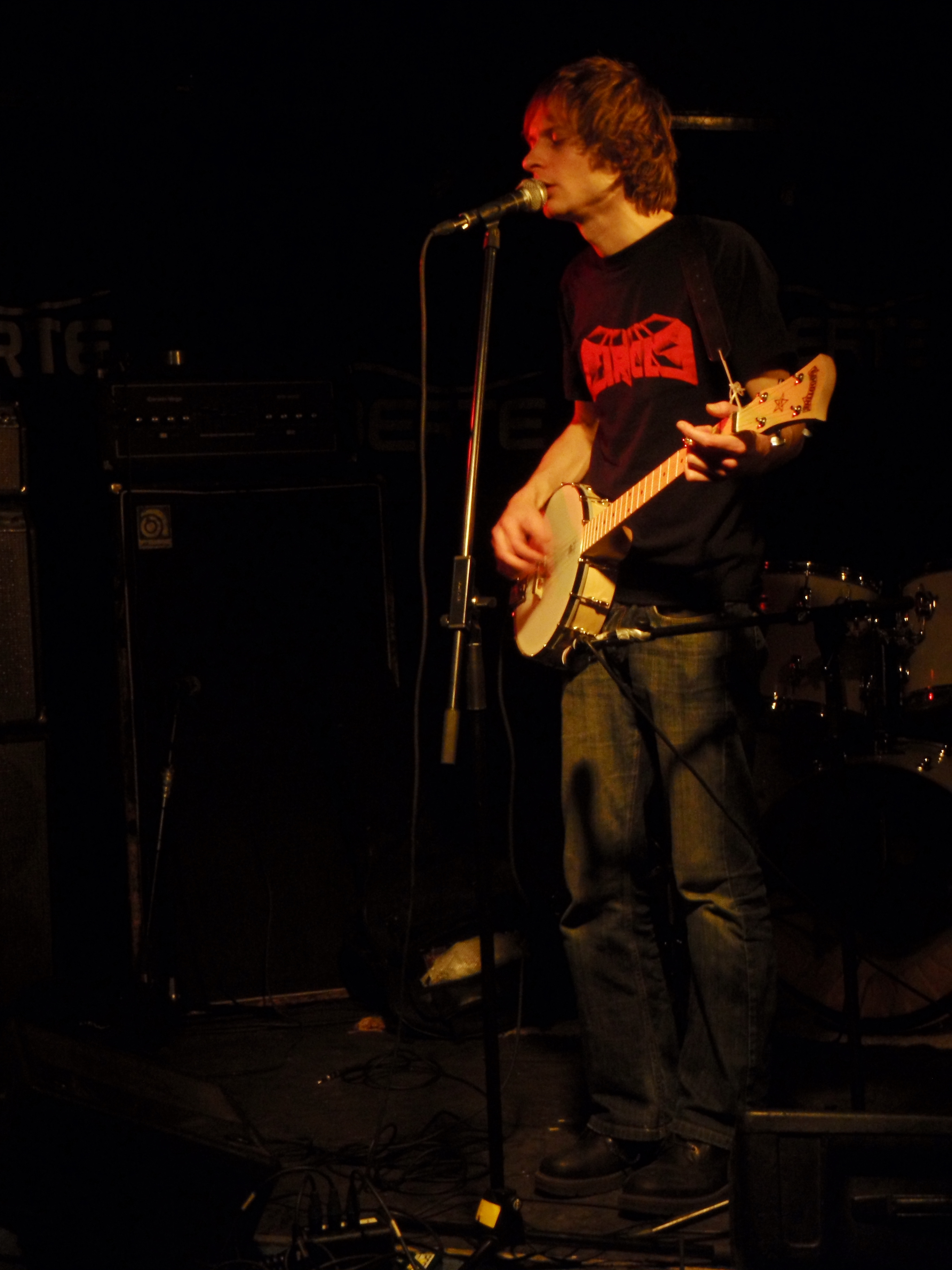

Background information
- Born: 1973 (age 52–53)
- Origin: Hamina, Finland
- Genres: Experimental rock, krautrock, folk
- Occupations: Musician, singer, songwriter
- Instruments: Guitar, banjo
- Years active: 1990–present
- Labels: Ektro Records, 9pm Records, Bad Vugum, BV2 Productions

Janne Westerlund (born 1973) is a Finnish musician, songwriter and visual artist known from such Finnish groups as Circle (with the band since 2001), Pharaoh Overlord, and Plain Ride. His main instrument is guitar but on his solo gigs he plays banjo as well. He sings and writes lyrics mainly in English. Westerlund's career started in the beginning of the 1990s in a small Finnish city called Hamina when he founded Sweetheart, an experimental noise rock group, with his friends. After Sweetheart, he released two albums of "organic electronica" with a trio called Chainsmoker.

All the studio and live recordings with his past and present bands included, Westerlund has played on approximately 50 albums. In the autumn of 2012 he released his debut solo album named Oran.

In 2013 he started a collaboration with Jyrki Nissinen, a Finnish cartoonist and musician, composing a soundtrack album for his comics book, Kehittymättömät ufot ("The Undeveloped Flying Objects").

Marshland, his second solo album, is released in January 2015 on Ektro Records.

== Discography ==
=== Chainsmoker ===
- 2001: Guarana Planet, CD (Bad Vugum)
- 2003: Stations, CD (BV^{2} Produktions/Bad Vugum)

=== Plain Ride ===
- 2005: Oh the Flow, CD (Ektro Records)
- 2007: Strange Trial, CD (Ektro Records)
- 2009: House on the Hill, CD (Ektro Records)
- 2011: Stonebridge, CD (Ektro Records)
- 2014: Skeleton Kites, LP/CD (Ektro Records)

=== Solo career ===
- 2012: Oran, CD
- 2013: Kehittymättömät ufot, a soundtrack LP/CD for a comics book by Jyrki Nissinen
- 2015: Marshland, LP/CD

=== Sweetheart ===
- 1991: Mr. Cocktail / White-Eye, 7" (Bad Vugum)
- 1992: Forestside / Rag Paradise, 7" (Bad Vugum)
- 1992: Well-Dressed Meat, LP/CD (Bad Vugum)
- 1993: Branchline / Diesel Engine, 7" (Bad Vugum)
- 1994: An Ordinary Family Visits Hell, LP/CD (Bad Vugum)
- 1996: Intoxicated Boom Boom, CD (Bad Vugum)
- 1998: Stitches Removal Day, CD (Bad Vugum)
