= Bad Vugum =

Finnish record label

- Founded: 1987
- Genre: indie rock, noise rock, experimental rock, electronica, hardcore punk, thrash metal
- Country of origin: Finland
- Location: Oulu: 1987-2001, Helsinki: 2002-

Bad Vugum is an independent record label originally based in Oulu, Finland. It was founded in 1987 by some of the members of the hardcore punk groups Kansanturvamusiikkikomissio and Radiopuhelimet for releasing the latter's music. The label's name comes from an epithet invented by Captain Beefheart, heard uttered during his song "Sue Egypt".

By the early 1990s it had grown into one of Finland's relatively higher-profile indie labels, with releases frequently getting positive reviews in American music fanzines such as Forced Exposure and Flipside. Many releases were also championed by the BBC radio DJ John Peel, who went on to invite such Bad Vugum bands as Deep Turtle, Circle and Aavikko to record Peel Sessions for his radio show as the first ever Finnish acts to do so. John Peel also invited Mieskuoro Huutajat to perform at the Meltdown Festival when he curated it in 1998.

Some bands were also featured on notable American indie labels: Alternative Tentacles released Hygiene, a compilation EP of Radiopuhelimet's early material, Drag City commissioned Liimanarina's debut album Spermarket, and several Bad Vugum acts were compiled for two If It Ain't The Snow, It's The Mosquitos double EPs on Sympathy For The Record Industry.

In 2002 one of the original founders, Kari Heikonen, bought out his two co-owners' shares and moved the company to Helsinki. Bad Vugum has continued to re-release and license out some of the old music, but all new music has been released under the BV^{2} Produktions sublabel. Some of these include acts as diverse as Cleaning Women, Hotguitars, Chainsmoker, Sekunda, Astro Can Caravan, Räjäyttäjät, and Dirty Projectors who licensed an abridged version of their album The Getty Address called Highlights from the Getty Address for the Finnish market. BV^{2} also published the Finnish edition of Daniel Clowes' acclaimed graphic novel Ghost World.

== Artists ==
- Aavikko
- Circle
- CMX
- Deep Turtle
- Dr. Gunni
- Jimi Tenor
- Keuhkot
- Läjä Äijälä
- Liimanarina
- Mieskuoro Huutajat
- Paska
- Radiopuhelimet
- Sweetheart, band founded by Janne Westerlund
