= Rättö ja Lehtisalo =

- Origin: Pori, Finland
- Genres: Krautrock, experimental, avant rock
- Years active: 2003–present
- Label: Ektro Records
- Members: Jussi Lehtisalo; Mika Rättö
- Website: Label website

Rättö ja Lehtisalo is an experimental rock-music band, featuring two members of the Finnish group Circle, Jussi Lehtisalo and Mika Rättö (who also performs with Kuusumun Profeetta). Their output is clearly influenced by krautrock acts such as Cluster, Neu! and Harmonia. They have also recorded as a trio with Finnish rock performer Kauko Röyhkä.

== Discography ==
=== Albums ===
- Kopernikus hortoilee näkinkengässä (Ektro Records, 2003)
- Pari lepakkoa Transylvaniassa (Ektro Records, 2004)
- Ed Benttonin briljantti stabilismi tai taivaallinen kylpysaippua (Ektro Records, 2006)
- Röyhkä ja Rättö ja Lehtisalo: Hiekkarantaa (Ektro Records, 2009)
- UU mama (Ektro Records, 2010)
- Matematiikka (Ektro Records, 2012)

=== Singles/EPs ===
- Valonnopeus (Sähkö Recordings, 2005)
- Reverend Bizarre/Rättö ja Lehtisalo split 12" (Ektro Records/Full Contact, 2008)
