= Jussi Lehtisalo =

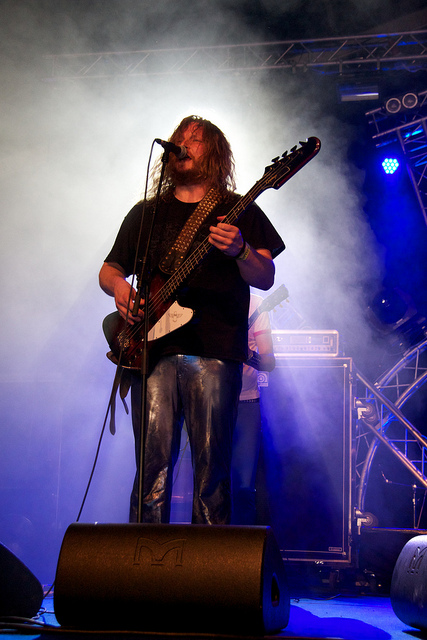
- Lehtisalo performing with Circle in 2010

Background information
- Born: 1972 (age 53–54)
- Origin: Pori, Finland
- Genres: Experimental rock; krautrock; heavy metal
- Occupations: Musician; songwriter
- Instruments: Bass, Guitar, Vocals
- Years active: 1991–present
- Label: Ektro

Jussi Lehtisalo (born 1972) is a Finnish musician. In 1991, he founded Circle, a prolific band drawing influences from heavy metal and krautrock to develop a style of repetitive experimental rock. He also runs a record label, Ektro Records, releasing his own music alongside left field rock and metal releases by artists such as Faust and Acid Mothers Temple.

== Biography ==
=== Circle ===
Still the main project for Lehtisalo's musical endeavours, Circle have released 40 albums since 1994. Throughout the band's ever-shifting line-up, Lehtisalo has been the only constant presence, and de facto leader. The current core line-up of the band – Mika Rättö, Janne Westerlund, Tomi Leppänen and Lehtisalo – is the longest consistent incarnation of the group.

=== Other projects ===
Lehtisalo is involved in a large number of projects outside of Circle, most notably Pharaoh Overlord, originally the trio of Leppänen, Westerlund and Lehtisalo indulging in a passion for stoner rock. He and Rättö have also released several albums as a duo (Rättö ja Lehtisalo) and one as a trio with Kauko Röyhkä. The improvisation-based Ektroverde uses various electronic instrument, jazz drumming, and 1970s-style progressive rock riffs. Other bands are Iron Magazine, Oric, Dekathlon, Pakasteet, Sakset, Doktor Kettu, Steel Mammoth and Lehtisalofamily, which consists of Lehtisalo accompanied by his parents. Grumbling Fur, meanwhile, is a collaboration with Daniel O'Sullivan of Guapo and Alexander Tucker, amongst others. 2012 saw the debut release from Split Cranium, a collaboration with Aaron Turner of Isis.

== Discography ==
=== Circle ===
See Circle discography

=== Jussi Lehtisalo ===
- Jussi Lehtisalo: Dead (2019, Ruton Music)
- Jussi Lehtisalo: Spectrum (2017, Ruton Music)
- Jussi Lehtisalo: Maisteri (2015, Full Contact)
- Jussi Lehtisalo: The Complete Solo Works (2013, Ektro)
- Jussi Lehtisalo: Interludes for Prepared Beast (2012, Ektro)
- Jussi Lehtisalo: Rotta (2010, Ektro)

=== Pharaoh Overlord ===
See Pharaoh Overlord discography

=== Rättö ja Lehtisalo ===
See Rättö ja Lehtisalo discography

=== Ektroverde ===
- Ektroverde, Pingvin (1998, Ektro Records CD)
- Ektroverde, Futuro – A New Stance For Tomorrow (1998, Ektro Records CD)
- Ektroverde, Arpeggio (1999, Bad Vugum CD)
- Ektroverde, Harakkakuisti (2000, Ektro Records CD)
- Ektroverde, Integral (2000, Snowdonia/Mizmaze CD)
- Ektroverde, Ukkossalama (2003, Ektro Records CD)

=== Steel Mammoth ===
- Steel Mammoth, Nuclear Barbarians (2007, Ektro Records CDEP)
- Steel Mammoth, Atomic Mountain (2007, Ektro Records CD)
- Steel Mammoth, The Kingdom of the Golden Hammer (2008, Super Metsä CD)
- Steel Mammoth, Nuclear Ritual (2009, Musapojat CD)
- Steel Mammoth, Radiation Funeral (2011, Ektro Records LP)
- Steel Mammoth, Nuclear Rebirth (2011, Full Contact Records LP)

=== Other projects ===
==== Albums ====
- Lehtisalofamily, Interplay (1997, Ektro Records CD)
- Kirvasto, Täydellisiä Kysymyksiä, Täydellisiä Vastauksia (1998, Bad Vugum CD)
- Eturivi, Ylhäisten Kastien Kelvottomat Jälkeläiset (2002, Verdura CD)
- Rakhim, Rakhim (2006, Qbico LP)
- Rakhim, Crimson Umbrella (2007, 20 Buck Spin CD)
- Doktor Kettu, Soft Delirium (2009, Super Metsä CD)
- Lusiferiinin Armosta, Nuolee (2009, Ektro Records CD)
- Susi-Unto, Puheluja pimeältä puolelta (2010, Full Contact LP)
- Grumbling Fur, Furrier (2011, Aurora Borealis CD)
- Split Cranium, Split Cranium (2012, Hydra Head Records CD/LP)
- Pakasteet with Charles Hayward: Molten Salt (2019, Full Contact LP)
- Pakasteet ja Draama-Helmi: Tyhjä risteys (2019, Full Contact LP)

==== Singles ====
- Ektroverde, Mortalaattori (1996, Ektro Records CDEP)
- Ektroverde, Music For Supermarket EP (1998, Bad Vugum CDEP)
- Ektroverde, Svart/Orange (1999, Fonal Records 7-inch)
- Ektroverde/Hinageshi Bondage, Varovaisesti Kotiin/Tänään Ruokalassa/Peltilehmä (1999, Verdura split 7-inch)
- Eturivi, Lempilapset (1999, Verdura 7-inch)
- Motorspandex, Torment Star (2008, Full Contact 7-inch)
- Arkhamin Kirjasto, Arkhamin Kirjasto (2010, Full Contact 7-inch)
