= Olavi Uusivirta discography =

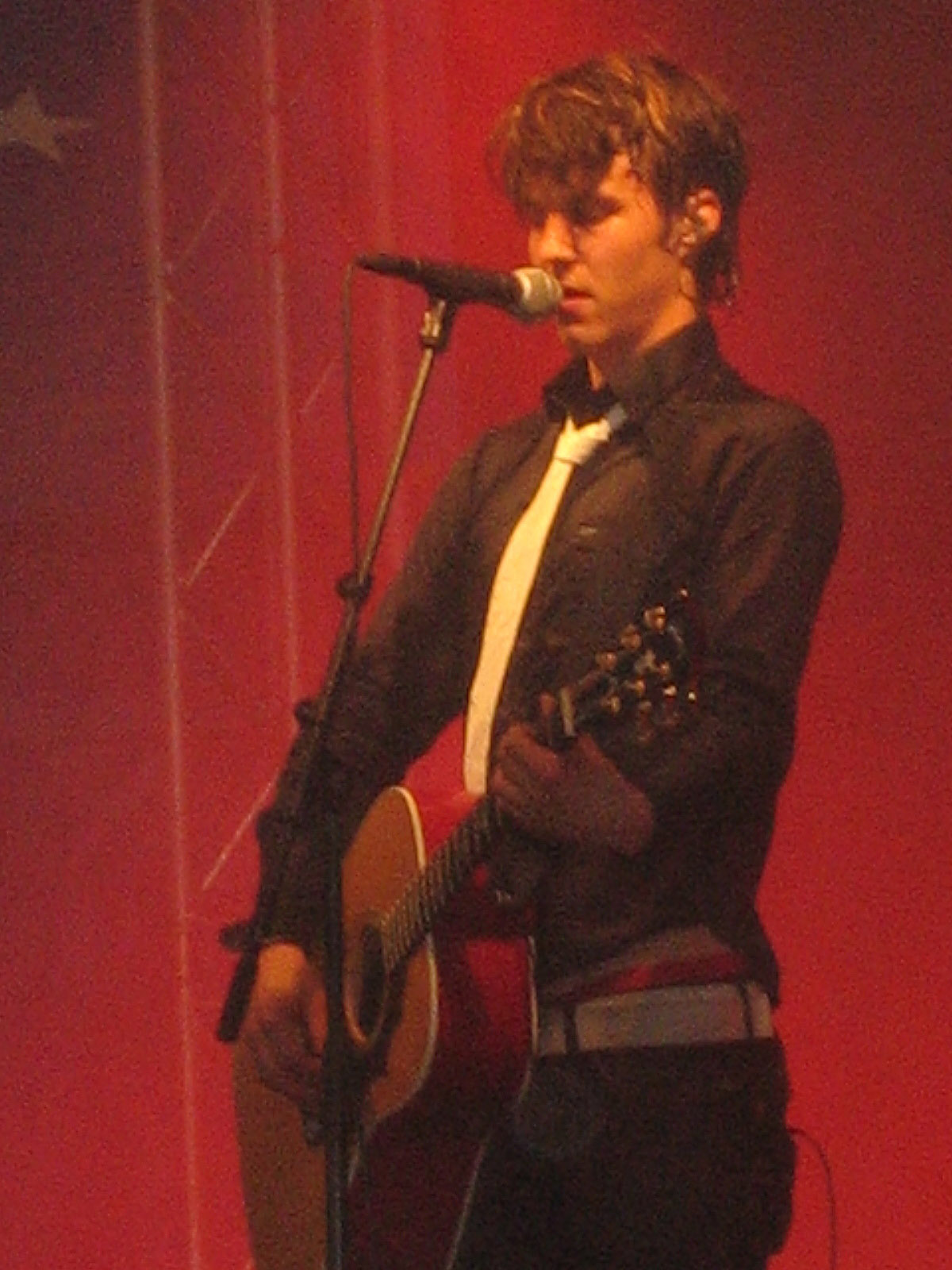
- Uusivirta in 2006
- Studio albums: 10
- Compilation albums: 1
- Singles: 20

This article contains the discography of Finnish singer and songwriter Olavi Uusivirta and includes information relating to his album and single releases.

== Albums ==
=== Studio albums ===
Year	Title	Peak position
Year	Title	FIN
2003	Nuoruustango	–
2005	Me ei kuolla koskaan	31
2008	Minä olen hullu	12
2010	Preeria	5
2012	Elvis istuu oikealla	7
2014	Ikuiset lapset	3
2016	Olavi	1
2019	Skorpioni	2
2022	Pieni kuolema	3
2026	Camouflage	4

=== Live albums ===
Year	Title	Peak position
Year	Title	FIN
2017	Olavi elää!	12

=== Compilation albums ===
Year	Title	Peak position
Year	Title	FIN
2013	27 suosikkia	25

== Singles ==
Year	Title	Peak position	Album
Year	Title	FIN	Album
2003	"Raivo härkä"	–	Nuoruustango
2003	"Jään"	–	Nuoruustango
2003	"Sininen huvimaja" (featuring Reetaleena)	–	Nuoruustango
2003	"Ei mitään koskaan ollutkaan"	–	Nuoruustango
2005	"Irrallaan"	14	Me ei kuolla koskaan
2008	"Salmisaaren Salome"	–	Minä olen hullu
2008	"Ukonlintu ja virvaliekki"	–	Minä olen hullu
2008	"6:06"	–	Minä olen hullu
2008	"Löysäläisen laulu"	–	Minä olen hullu
2010	"Nukketalo palaa"	–	Preeria
2010	"Erika"	–	Preeria
2010	"Sydänmaa"	–	Preeria
2011	"Nuori ja kaunis" (Anna Järvinen featuring Olavi Uusivirta)	7	Elokuu soundtrack
2012	"Nuoruus"	–	Elvis istuu oikealla
2012	"Oodi ilolle"	–	Elvis istuu oikealla
2013	"Tiet etäisyyksiin"	–	27 suosikkia
2013	"Tuhat vuotta sitten" (featuring Pauliina Kokkonen)	–	27 suosikkia
2014	"Kauneus sekoittaa mun pään"	–	Ikuiset lapset
2015	"Hän laulaa kuin kuolisi huomenna"	–	–
2015	"Rakastajat"	–	–
2016	"Tanssit vaikka et osaa"	–	Olavi
2020	"2020" (with Anna Puu)	9	
2023	"Viimeinen tanssi" (with Behm)	2	
2025	"Ollaanko tämä kesä näin?"	11	
2026	"Kipee" (with Vesala)	28	Non-album single
