= Qstock =

Annual rock festival in Oulu, Finland

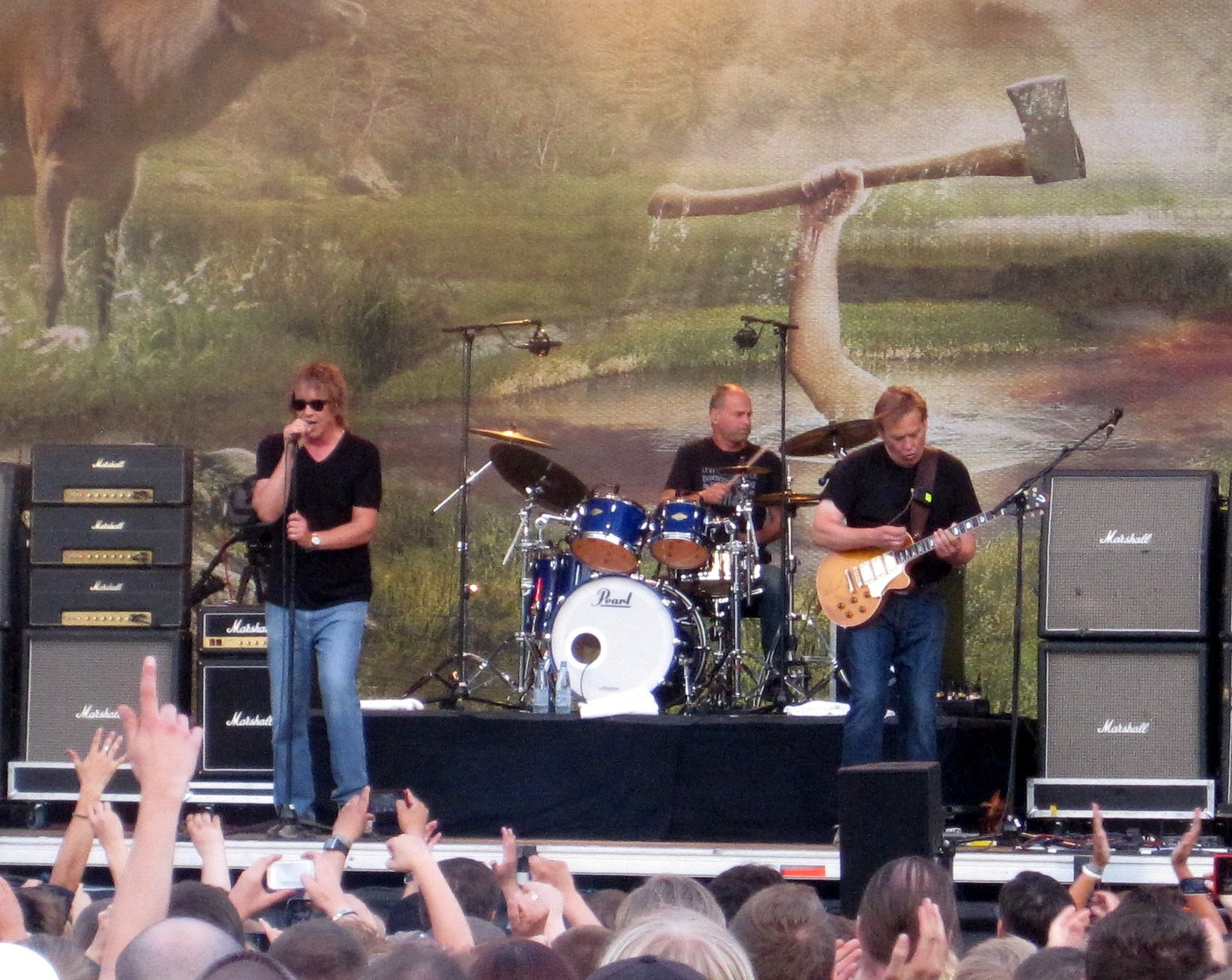
- Eppu Normaali at Qstock in 2013
- Genre: Rock
- Dates: End of July
- Locations: Koskikeskus, Oulu, Finland
- Coordinates: 65°01′10″N 025°27′45″E
- Years active: 2003–present
- Organizer: Qstock Oy
- Website: qstock.fi/en/

Qstock is an annual two-day music festival held at the end of July in Oulu, Finland. The festival lineup includes some of the biggest names in both the domestic and international music scene, regardless of the genre. The first Qstock festival was organised in 2003. The festival has quickly grown into the biggest summer event in northern Finland, with 40,000 visitors. As of July 2023, Qstock has been sold out nine times in a row. The festival acts as sort of a successor of the former Kuusrock festival which was organised in Oulu from the 1970s until the early 1990s.

Qstock is owned by local ice hockey organisation Oulun Kärpät and the event's official, promotional vehicle is a white/yellow coloured VW Kleinbus from 1965.

Qstock has its online TV channel called 'QTV' which releases new episodes throughout the Spring, with interviews from each summer's upcoming festival lineup. The full length episodes can be viewed via Qstock Festival's YouTube channel.

== Lineup ==
=== 2003 ===
1st Qstock was organised in Oulu, 18 – 19 July 2003. The organisers expected the festival to get approximately 2,000 visitors, but eventually the number grew to approximately 7,000 visitors. The lineup included, amongst others; Sentenced, Negative and Radiopuhelimet.

=== 2004 ===
2nd Qstock was organised in Kuusisaari, Oulu, 23 – 24 July 2004.

The lineup included a.o. Kotiteollisuus, Sentenced and Suburban Tribe. The 2004 event also saw the comeback performance of Brussel Kaupallinen.

=== 2005 ===
3rd Qstock was organised in Oulu, 29 – 30 July 2005.

The lineup included a.o. Apulanta, CMX, Hidria Spacefolk, Negative, Moses Hazy, The 69 Eyes, The Coffinshakers and Kuolleet Intiaanit.

=== 2006 ===
4th Qstock was organised in Oulu, 28 – 29 July 2006.

The lineup included Motörhead, Paradise Lost, The Cardigans, Anekdoten, Sonata Arctica, Egotrippi, PMMP, Tiktak, Mokoma, Negative, Poets of the Fall, Tuomari Nurmio, Lemonator, Kemopetrol, Teräsbetoni, Amorphis, Diablo, Poisonblack and Shade Empire.

The festival area also included a huge tent called 'Happiteltta', organised by a local Trank-collective, featuring artists such as Nicole Willis & The Soul Investigators, Modeselektor (D), Thomas Brinkmann (D), Zentex (D), Kiki & Silversurfer, Magyar Posse, Plutonium 74, and I Was a Teenage Satan Worshipper.

In 2006 the festival capacity was significantly increased by bringing the main entrance closer to the city center. The visitor traffic rush at entrances was also decreased by organising ticket > wristband exchange spots in the city central.

=== 2007 ===
5th Qstock was organised in Oulu, 27 – 28 July 2007.

The lineup included a.o. Turbonegro, The Coffinshakers, The Soundtrack of Our Lives, Sparzanza, Celtic Frost, The Rasmus, Hanoi Rocks, Stam1na, Sonata Arctica, Poets of the Fall, Sunrise Avenue, CMX, Von Hertzen Brothers, Zen Cafe, Maija Vilkkumaa, PMMP, Tarot, Mieskuoro Huutajat and Morley.

=== 2008 ===
6th Qstock festival was organised in Kuusisaari, Oulu, 25 – 26 July 2008.

The lineup included a.o. Manic Street Preachers, Within Temptation, Dark Tranquility, Poets of the Fall, Ismo Alanko Teholla, Sturm ind Drang, J&J, Kotiteollisuus, 22 Pistepirkko, Scandinavian Music Group, Mokoma, Stam1na, Diablo, Entwine, PMMP, YUP, Amorphis, Aknestik, Leverage, and Seith. The so-called "Jälkikäynti-club" featured the heavy metal band W.A.S.P. The "Happiteltta" featured The Field, 120 Days, Äänijännite, Eero Johannes, Komytea and Artificial Latvamäki.

=== 2009 ===
7th Qstock festival was organised in Kuusisaari, Oulu, 24 – 25 July 2009.

The lineup included a.o. Pain, Sparzanza, Major Parkinson, Heaven and Hell, Elephant 9, Apulanta, Pete Parkkonen, Happoradio, Maija Vilkkumaa, Haloo Helsinki!, Kotiteollisuus, Radiopuhelimet, Sacred Crucifix, Tuomari Nurmio, PMMP, Op:l Bastards, Amorphis, The Black League, CMX, Egotrippi, The Rasmus, Kauko Röyhkä & Rättö & Lehtisalo, Stam1na, Anna Puu and Cheek.

=== 2010 ===
The 8th Qstock festival was organised in Kuusisaari, Oulu, on 30 – 31 July 2010.

The lineup included Meshuggah, Raised Fist, Europe, Gösta Berlings Saga, Chisu, Eppu Normaali, Sonata Arctica, Husky Rescue, Eläkeläiset, Ismo Alanko & Teho-osasto, Doom Unit, Samuli Putro, Jenni Vartiainen, Amorphis, Fintelligens, Viikate, J. Karjalainen Polkabilly Rebels, Klamydia, Tuomo, Stam1na, Mokoma and Radiopuhelimet.

=== 2011 ===
The 9th Qstock festival was organised in Kuusisaari & Raatti, Oulu, 29 – 30 July 2011.

=== 2012 ===
The 10th Qstock festival was organised in Kuusisaari & Raatti, Oulu, 27 – 28 July 2012.

Lineup on Fri 27: Michael Monroe, Apocalyptica, PMMP, Sonata Arctica, Iiris Vesik, Jippu, Notkea Rotta, French Films, Satan Takes A Holiday, Kotiteollisuus, Klamydia, Paprika Korps, Black City, Radiopuhelimet, Matalat Majat, Madhatter, JVG, Petri Nygård, Haterial, TKU 10, Ruger Hauer, Gracias, Relentless, For the Imperium and Salaseura.

Lineup on Sat 28: Roxette, Arch Enemy, Amaranthe, Apulanta, Chisu, Jukka Poika & Sound Explosion Band, Kauko Röyhkä & Narttu, Reckless Love, Emma Salokoski Ensemble, Stam1na, Sparzanza, Fintelligens, Death Letters, Pariisin Kevät, Viikate, Haloo Helsinki!, Martti Servo ja Napander, Diandra Flores, Sara, Tes La Rok, Kirsi Helena, Solonen, Hebosagil, Olli PA & OPP, Swallow The Sun, Before The Dawn, Satellite Stories, Tunguska Press, Ruudolf ja Karri Koira, Stepa & Are, Väinö Tuonela & Kerettiläiset, Bongo Rock, Kairon; IRSE!, Torttu and Apina.

=== 2013 ===
The 11th Qstock festival was organised in Kuusisaari & Raatti, Oulu, 26 – 27 July 2013. The festival was sold out with 30,000 visitors.

Lineup on Fri 26: J. Karjalainen, Krista Siegfrids, Temple Balls, Levon Zoltar, PMMP, Bloodred Hourglass, Julma-Henri x RPK, Kotiteollisuus, First Aid Kit, Pearly Gates, Michael Monroe, Battle Beast, Teflon Brothers, Turmion Kätilöt, The Scenes, Kolmas Nainen, Anna Puu, Shining, Stig & Kullankaivajat, Von Hertzen Brothers, Mariska & Pahat Sudet, Dimi, Sini Sabotage, Within Temptation, Eevil Stöö, DJ Kridlokk & Koksukoo, and Radiopuhelimet.

Lineup on Sat 27: Jonne Aaron, Elämän Jani & Totuuden Todistajat, Antti Tuisku, Eva & Manu, Petri Nygård, Raappana & Sound Explosion Band, Justimus and Nost3 & Protro, ESOM, Cheek, Santa Cruz, Funksons, Mokoma, Satellite Stories, Domovoyd, Jukka Poika & Sound Explosion Band, Rytmihäiriö, Laineen Kasperi & Palava Kaupunki, Disco Ensemble, Laura Närhi, Kalmah, Amorphis, Pää Kii, Inner Circle, Haloo Helsinki!, Fuckface Unstoppable, Mushmouthed Talk, Eppu Normaali, Bombus, Elokuu, Katatonia, Karri Koira, The Magnettes, HIM, Stepa & Are and Wöyh.

=== 2014 ===
The 12th Qstock festival was organised in Kuusisaari & Raatti, Oulu, on 25 – 26 July 2014. The festival was sold out. Pre-announced festival headliners were Volbeat for Friday 25 and Megadeth for Saturday 26 July.

Lineup on Fri 25: Happoradio, Nopsajalka, Alataajuus-deejiit, Magic Meredith, Erin, Lost Society, Risto, Viikate, Graveyard, Nuoret Marttyyrit, Sonata Arctica, Iisa, Elastinen, Michael Monroe, Scandinavian Music Group, Pummiharmonia, Jenni Vartiainen, Kypck, Gracias & The Globe Band, J. Karjalainen, DJ Q, Sanni, Tuomas Henrikin Jeesuksen Kristuksen Bändi, Kasmir, Juju and Radiopuhelimet.

Lineup on Sat 26: Softengine, Alataajuus-deejiit, Joma, Jukka Poika & Sound Explosion Band, The Blanko, Setä Tamu, Kuningas Pähkinä, Mäkki, Kube, Chebaleba, Samuli Putro, Santa Cruz, Night Lives, Anna Abreu, Wolfheart, Tuomas Kauhanen, Pariisin Kevät, Poisonblack, The Scenes, Haloo Helsinki!, The Stanfields, Brädi, Soilwork, DJ Haus, Redrama, Villi Huhu, Kaija Koo, Profane Omen, JVG, Stam1na, Dj Mala, The 69 Eyes, Blind Channel, Cheek, Bigelf, KC/MD Mafia, Apulanta, The Asteroids Galaxy Tour, Disco Fiasco, Musta Barbaari, Mikael Gabriel and Brother Firetribe.
