= List of number-one albums of 2016 (Finland) =

This is the complete list of number-one albums sold in Finland in 2016 according to the Official Finnish Charts compiled by Musiikkituottajat – IFPI Finland. The chart is based on sales of physical and digital albums as well as music streaming.

== Chart history ==
Physical & digital albums
Week	Album	Artist(s)	Reference(s)
Week 1	25	Adele	
Week 2	Blackstar	David Bowie	
Week 3	Blackstar	David Bowie	
Week 4	Blackstar	David Bowie	
Week 5	XII – Kouvostomolli	Viikate	
Week 6	Iso vauva Jeesus	Eevil Stöö	
Week 7	Olavi	Olavi Uusivirta	
Week 8	Alpha Omega	Cheek	
Week 9	Alpha Omega	Cheek	
Week 10	Alpha Omega	Cheek	
Week 11	Madafakin levy	Roope Salminen & Koirat	
Week 12	Elokuutio	Stam1na	
Week 13	Mature	Ruger Hauer	
Week 14	Jumalten aika	Moonsorrow	
Week 15	Yhdessä	Robin	
Week 16	Yhdessä	Robin	
Week 17	En kommentoi	Antti Tuisku	
Week 18	En kommentoi	Antti Tuisku	
Week 19	Elastinen Feat.	Elastinen	
Week 20	Elastinen Feat.	Elastinen	
Week 21	Puolet taivaasta - puolet helvetistä	Yö	
Week 22	Puolet taivaasta - puolet helvetistä	Yö	
Week 23	Seal the Deal & Let's Boogie	Volbeat	
Week 24	Seal the Deal & Let's Boogie	Volbeat	
Week 25	Vesala	Vesala	
Week 26	Vesala	Vesala	
Week 27	Vesala	Vesala	
Week 28	Vesala	Vesala	
Week 29	Vesala	Vesala	
Week 30	Vesala	Vesala	
Week 31	Vesala	Vesala	
Week 32	Vesala	Vesala	
Week 33	Vesala	Vesala	
Week 34	The Last Stand	Sabaton	
Week 35	Kromihammas	Tuuttimörkö	
Week 36	Retroperjantai - We Love the 90's, Vol. 2	Various artists	
Week 37	Skeleton Tree	Nick Cave and the Bad Seeds	
Week 38	Vien sut täältä kotiin	Lauri Tähkä	
Week 39	Winter's Gate	Insomnium	
Week 40	Sinä olet kaunis	Suvi Teräsniska	
Week 41	Sanni	Sanni	
Week 42	Sanni	Sanni	
Week 43	Surusilmäinen kauneus	Tuure Kilpeläinen ja Kaihon Karavaani	
Week 44	Vain elämää – Kausi 5 ensimmäinen kattaus	Vain elämää	
Week 45	Vain elämää – Kausi 5 ensimmäinen kattaus	Vain elämää	
Week 46	Vain elämää – Kausi 5 ensimmäinen kattaus	Vain elämää	
Week 47	Hardwired... to Self-Destruct	Metallica	
Week 48	Hardwired... to Self-Destruct	Metallica	
Week 49	Hardwired... to Self-Destruct	Metallica	
Week 50	Romanssi	Jarkko Ahola	
Week 51	Hardwired... to Self-Destruct	Metallica	
Week 52	Vain elämää – Kausi 5 ensimmäinen kattaus	Vain elämää	

== See also ==
- List of number-one singles of 2016 (Finland)
