= Mäkki =

Finnish rapper and DJ

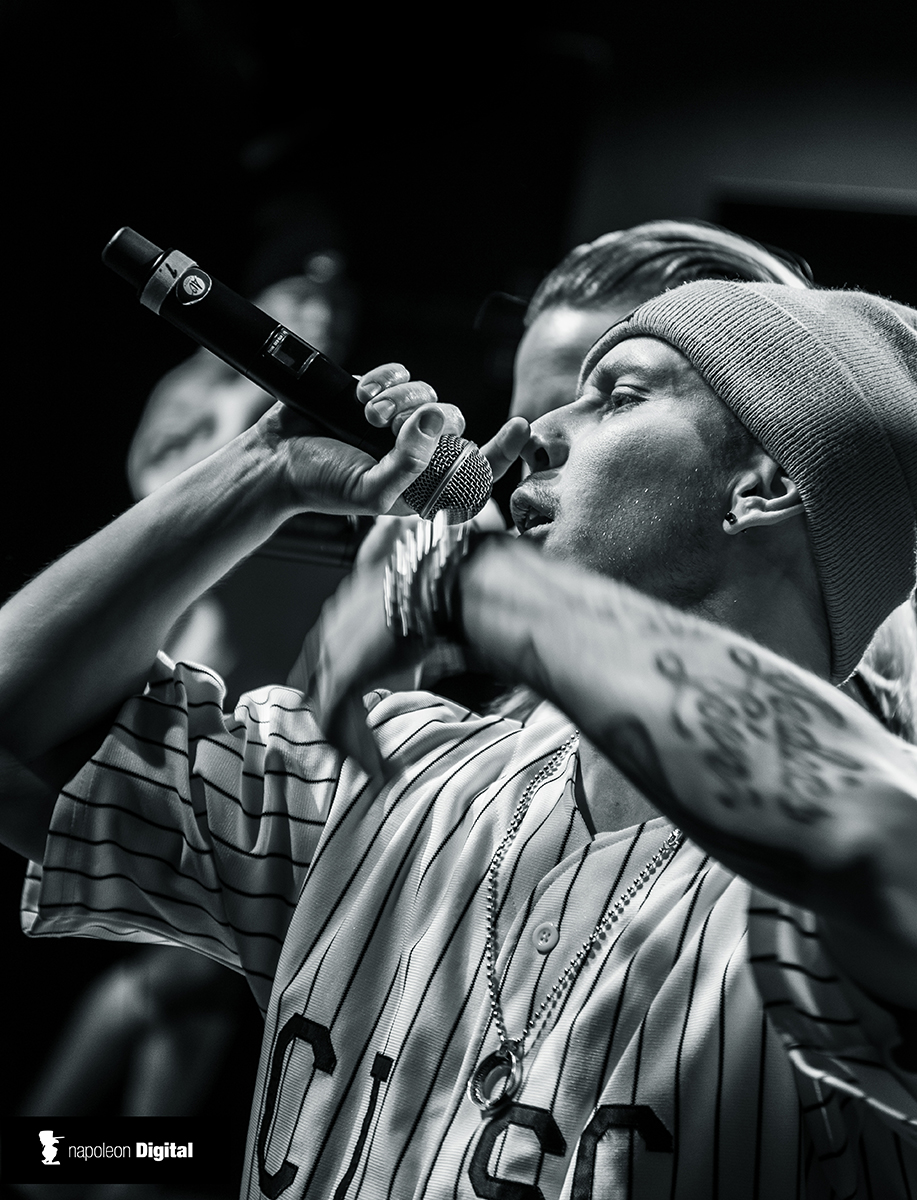
- Mäkki in 2015
- Born: Gert Kaasik; Tallinn, Estonia
- Occupations: rapper and DJ

Gert Kaasik, known professionally as Mäkki, is a Finnish rapper and DJ.

== Biography ==
Kaasik was born in Tallinn, Estonia. He later moved to Finland, and first came to prominence in the summer of 2013, when he released a music video and his own version of the Sini Sabotage hit "Levikset repee". It was followed by his version of Musta Barbaari hit "Salil eka salil vika". Mäkki went on to publish the singles and music videos for "Dippaa", "Kalenteris Tyhjää" and "Grilli Kuumana". He released his solo album Ihan pomona on 20 February 2015 with collaborations from Kube, Ruma, Adi L Hasla, Tippa-T, Kuningas Pähkinä, Setä Tamu, Super Janne and Sini Sabotage. The album peaked at number 11 on the Finnish Albums Chart.

== Discography ==
=== Albums ===
Year	Album	Peak positions	Certification
Year	Album	FIN	Certification
2015	Ihan pomona	11	
2016	Muistikuvien vanki / Takas		
2017	Menee hyvin / Lama-ajan Lapsi		
2018	Muistikuvien Vanki		
2018	Sun Kyydissä / Oikein		
2020	Meijän Takii / Wörtti		
2026	Pläänit Uusiks		

=== Singles ===
Year	Title	Peak positions	Album
Year	Title	FIN	Album
2013	"Laival eka laival vika"	—	Non-album singles
2013	"Murheist viis" (featuring Lerma)	—	Non-album singles
2013	"Pahat pimut" (featuring Kube)	—	Non-album singles
2014	"Grilli kuumana" (featuring Ruma)	—	Non-album singles
2016	"Pakastin"	7	Non-album singles
2016	"Apuva"	4	Non-album singles
2016	"Muistikuvien vanki" (featuring Keko Salata)	31	Non-album singles
2016	"Vampyyri"	—	Non-album singles
2017	"Mixet tahdo" (featuring Pyhimys)	2	Non-album singles
2017	"Satamiljoonaa kertaa" (featuring Reino Nordin)	11	Non-album singles
2017	"Juoppokuski" (featuring Arttu Wiskari)	12	Non-album singles
2017	"Menee hyvin" (featuring Kielijuhani and Slim Mill)	12	Non-album singles
2018	"Pakettimatka" (with Yksi Totuus and Hesaäijä, featuring Seksikäs-Suklaa and Slim Mill)	20	Non-album singles
2019	"Satasen laina"	6	Non-album singles
2019	"Nuudelikeitto" (featuring Arttu Wiskari)	—	Non-album singles
2019	"Jon Snow" (with Louhi and Ruma)	—	Non-album singles
2020	"Meijän Takii"	—	Non-album singles
2020	"Drop It"	—	Non-album singles
2021	"Pläänit Uusiks"	—	Non-album singles
2021	"Fyfyy" (featuring Kube)	—	Non-album singles
2022	"Koita Kasvaa Aikuiseks"	—	Non-album singles
2022	"Sä et kestä" (with Dj Sweedy and Nick-E Maggz)	—	Non-album singles
2022	"Blessed" (with Olli August)	—	Non-album singles
2022	"Fyfyy (Remix)" (with Louhi and $auli)	—	Non-album singles
2022	"No Problemo" (feat. Jedidi)	—	Non-album singles
2024	KLIK KLAK BOOM	—	Non-album singles
2024	Edelleen (with Larry)	—	Non-album singles
2024	Scifi (feat. Jedidi)	—	Non-album singles
2024	Pakumies	—	Non-album singles
2025	Ota Must Kii (feat. Raappana)	—	Non-album singles
