= List of number-one singles of 2016 (Finland) =

This is the complete list of (physical and digital) number-one singles sold in Finland in 2016, according to the Official Finnish Charts. The list on the left side of the box (Suomen virallinen singlelista, "the Official Finnish Singles Chart") represents physical and digital track sales as well as music streaming, the one in the middle (Suomen virallinen latauslista, "the Official Finnish Download Chart") represents sales of digital tracks and the one on the right side (Suomen virallinen radiosoittolista, "the Official Finnish Airplay Chart") represents airplay.

== Chart history ==
Official Finnish Singles Chart				Official Finnish Download Chart				Official Finnish Airplay Chart			
Issue date	Song	Artist(s)	Reference(s)	Issue date	Song	Artist(s)	Reference(s)	Issue date	Song	Artist(s)	Reference(s)
Week 1	"Paluu tulevaisuuteen"	JVG		Week 1	"Paluu tulevaisuuteen"	JVG		Week 1	"Valot pimeyksien reunoilla"	Apulanta	
Week 2	"Paluu tulevaisuuteen"	JVG		Week 2	"Paluu tulevaisuuteen"	JVG		Week 2	"Tequila"	Vesala	
Week 3	"Faded"	Alan Walker		Week 3	"Faded"	Alan Walker		Week 3	"Valot pimeyksien reunoilla"	Apulanta	
Week 4	"Faded"	Alan Walker		Week 4	"Patrick Swayze"	Valovuosi		Week 4	"Tequila"	Vesala	
Week 5	"Faded"	Alan Walker		Week 5	"Pillowtalk"	Zayn		Week 5	"Tequila"	Vesala	
Week 6	"Faded"	Alan Walker		Week 6	"Faded"	Alan Walker		Week 6	"Tequila"	Vesala	
Week 7	"Että mitähän vittua"	Sanni		Week 7	"Että mitähän vittua"	Sanni		Week 7	"Tequila"	Vesala	
Week 8	"Että mitähän vittua"	Sanni		Week 8	"Että mitähän vittua"	Sanni		Week 8	"Tequila"	Vesala	
Week 9	"Että mitähän vittua"	Sanni		Week 9	"Että mitähän vittua"	Sanni		Week 9	"Fast Car"	Jonas Blue (featuring Dakota)	
Week 10	"Me ollaan ne, Pt. 2"	Cheek (featuring Nikke Ankara, Elastinen, JVG, Kube & Pete Parkkonen)		Week 10	"Me ollaan ne, Pt. 2"	Cheek (featuring Nikke Ankara, Elastinen, JVG, Kube & Pete Parkkonen)		Week 10	"Tequila"	Vesala	
Week 11	"Me ollaan ne, Pt. 2"	Cheek (featuring Nikke Ankara, Elastinen, JVG, Kube & Pete Parkkonen)		Week 11	"Että mitähän vittua"	Sanni		Week 11	"Fast Car"	Jonas Blue (featuring Dakota)	
Week 12	"Lempo"	Elastinen (featuring Lauri Tähkä)		Week 12 (Note: Both songs were ranked as number one.)	"Että mitähän vittua"	Sanni		Week 12	"Fast Car"	Jonas Blue (featuring Dakota)	
Week 12	"Lempo"	Elastinen (featuring Lauri Tähkä)		Week 12	"Welcome to the Show"	Adam Lambert (featuring Laleh)		Week 12	"Fast Car"	Jonas Blue (featuring Dakota)	
Week 13	"Lempo"	Elastinen (featuring Lauri Tähkä)		Week 13	"Faded"	Alan Walker		Week 13	"Fast Car"	Jonas Blue (featuring Dakota)	
Week 14	"Ettei nyt vaan sattuis mitään"	Nikke Ankara		Week 14	"Sireenit"	Evelina		Week 14	"Fast Car"	Jonas Blue (featuring Dakota)	
Week 15	"Sireenit"	Evelina		Week 15	"Lähiöunelmii"	Teflon Brothers (featuring Mariska)		Week 15	"Cheap Thrills"	Sia (featuring Sean Paul)	
Week 16	"Täytyy jaksaa"	Elastinen (featuring Sami Hedberg)		Week 16	"Kaikki mussa rakastaa kaikkea sun"	Anna Abreu		Week 16	"Cheap Thrills"	Sia (featuring Sean Paul)	
Week 17	"Täytyy jaksaa"	Elastinen (featuring Sami Hedberg)		Week 17	"Purple Rain"	Prince and The Revolution		Week 17	"Morsian"	Lauri Tähkä	
Week 18	"Pannaan Suomi kuntoon"	Petri Nygård		Week 18	"Pannaan Suomi kuntoon"	Petri Nygård		Week 18	"Pyydä multa anteeks kunnolla"	Antti Tuisku	
Week 19	"Pannaan Suomi kuntoon"	Petri Nygård		Week 19	"Pannaan Suomi kuntoon"	Petri Nygård		Week 19	"Morsian"	Lauri Tähkä	
Week 20	"Hehkuu"	JVG		Week 20	"Hehkuu"	JVG		Week 20	"Morsian"	Lauri Tähkä	
Week 21	"Hehkuu"	JVG		Week 21	"Täytyy jaksaa"	Elastinen (featuring Sami Hedberg)		Week 21	"Oota mua"	Elastinen (featuring Johanna Kurkela)	
Week 22	"Hehkuu"	JVG		Week 22	"Täytyy jaksaa"	Elastinen (featuring Sami Hedberg)		Week 22	"Oota mua"	Elastinen (featuring Johanna Kurkela)	
Week 23	"Hehkuu"	JVG		Week 23	"Hubba Bubba"	Teflon Brothers (featuring Ressu Redford and Heavyweight)		Week 23	"Can't Stop the Feeling!"	Justin Timberlake	
Week 24	"Hehkuu"	JVG		Week 24	"Vahinko"	Sanni		Week 24	"Hehkuu"	JVG	
Week 25	"Hehkuu"	JVG		Week 25	"Hehkuu"	JVG		Week 25	"Hehkuu"	JVG	
Week 26	"Läikkyy"	Arttu Lindeman		Week 26	"Hehkuu"	JVG		Week 26	"Hehkuu"	JVG	
Week 27	"Läikkyy"	Arttu Lindeman		Week 27	"Olet mun kaikuluotain"	Ville Valo		Week 27	"Hehkuu"	JVG	
Week 28	"Läikkyy"	Arttu Lindeman		Week 28	"Snadi"	Roope Salminen & Koirat		Week 28	"Hehkuu"	JVG	
Week 29	"Snadi"	Roope Salminen & Koirat		Week 29	"Rise"	Katy Perry		Week 29	"Hehkuu"	JVG	
Week 30	"Snadi"	Roope Salminen & Koirat		Week 30	"Cold Water"	Major Lazer (featuring Justin Bieber and MØ)		Week 30	"Hehkuu"	JVG	
Week 31	"Cold Water"	Major Lazer (featuring Justin Bieber and MØ)		Week 31	"Karma"	Alma		Week 31	"Vahinko"	Sanni	
Week 32	"Söpö"	Hank Solo		Week 32	"Let Me Love You"	DJ Snake (featuring Justin Bieber)		Week 32	"Vahinko"	Sanni	
Week 33	"Söpö"	Hank Solo		Week 33	"Soittorasia"	Petri Nygård (featuring Mariska)		Week 33	"Hehkuu"	JVG	
Week 34	"All Good Everything"	Cheek		Week 34	"All Good Everything"	Cheek		Week 34	"Hehkuu"	JVG	
Week 35	"Faijas"	Arttu Lindeman (featuring Lucas)		Week 35	"All Good Everything"	Cheek		Week 35	"Siniset tikkaat"	Kaija Koo	
Week 36	"Faijas"	Arttu Lindeman (featuring Lucas)		Week 36	"Don't Be So Shy" (Filatov & Karas Remix)	Imany		Week 36	"Siniset tikkaat"	Kaija Koo	
Week 36	"Faijas"	Arttu Lindeman (featuring Lucas)		Week 36	"Karma"	Alma		Week 36	"Siniset tikkaat"	Kaija Koo	
Week 37	"Let Me Love You"	DJ Snake (featuring Justin Bieber)		Week 37	"Perfect Illusion"	Lady Gaga		Week 37	"Siniset tikkaat"	Kaija Koo	
Week 38	"Oo se kun oot"	Sanni (featuring Paperi T)		Week 38	"Pauhaava sydän"	Mikael Gabriel		Week 38	"Siniset tikkaat"	Kaija Koo	
Week 39	"Pauhaava sydän"	Mikael Gabriel		Week 39	"Pauhaava sydän"	Mikael Gabriel		Week 39	"Siniset tikkaat"	Kaija Koo	
Week 40	"Pauhaava sydän"	Mikael Gabriel		Week 40	"This Town"	Niall Horan		Week 40	"Siniset tikkaat"	Kaija Koo	
Week 41	"Lumi teki enkelin eteiseen"	Mikael Gabriel		Week 41	"Nää yöt ei anna armoo"	Kaija Koo (featuring Cheek)		Week 41	"Jotain niin oikeaa"	Juha Tapio	
Week 42	"Lumi teki enkelin eteiseen"	Mikael Gabriel		Week 42	"Nää yöt ei anna armoo"	Kaija Koo (featuring Cheek)		Week 42	"Jotain niin oikeaa"	Juha Tapio	
Week 43	"Menee tunteisiin"	Arttu Lindeman		Week 43	"Move Your Body"	Sia		Week 43	"The Greatest"	Sia (featuring Kendrick Lamar)	
Week 44	"Menee tunteisiin"	Arttu Lindeman		Week 44	"Nää yöt ei anna armoo"	Kaija Koo (featuring Cheek)		Week 44	"The Greatest"	Sia (featuring Kendrick Lamar)	
Week 45	"Revolveri"	JVG, Elias Gould and MGI		Week 45	"Revolveri"	JVG, Elias Gould and MGI		Week 45	"The Greatest"	Sia (featuring Kendrick Lamar)	
Week 46	"Rockabye"	Clean Bandit (featuring Sean Paul and Anne-Marie)		Week 46	"Rockabye"	Clean Bandit (featuring Sean Paul and Anne-Marie)		Week 46	"The Greatest"	Sia (featuring Kendrick Lamar)	
Week 47	"Rockabye"	Clean Bandit (featuring Sean Paul and Anne-Marie)		Week 47	"Move Your Body"	Sia		Week 47	"Lumi teki enkelin eteiseen"	Mikael Gabriel	
Week 48	"Rockabye"	Clean Bandit (featuring Sean Paul and Anne-Marie)		Week 48	"Sinuhe"	Profeetat, Elastinen and Cheek		Week 48	"Lumi teki enkelin eteiseen"	Mikael Gabriel	
Week 49	"Sinuhe"	Profeetat, Elastinen and Cheek		Week 49	"Sinuhe"	Profeetat, Elastinen and Cheek		Week 49	"Rakas"	Haloo Helsinki!	
Week 50	"Alone"	Alan Walker		Week 50	"Just Hold On"	Steve Aoki and Louis Tomlinson		Week 50	"Rockabye"	Clean Bandit (featuring Sean Paul and Anne-Marie)	
Week 51	"Alone"	Alan Walker		Week 51	"Just Hold On"	Steve Aoki and Louis Tomlinson		Week 51	"Rockabye"	Clean Bandit (featuring Sean Paul and Anne-Marie)	
Week 52	"Loistat pimeäs"	Mikael Gabriel		Week 52	"Alone"	Alan Walker		Week 52	"Autiosaari"	Tuure Kilpeläinen and Kaihon Karavaani	

== See also ==
- List of number-one albums of 2016 (Finland)
