= Ex Tuuttiz =

Finnish rapper, music producer and DJ (1988-2025)

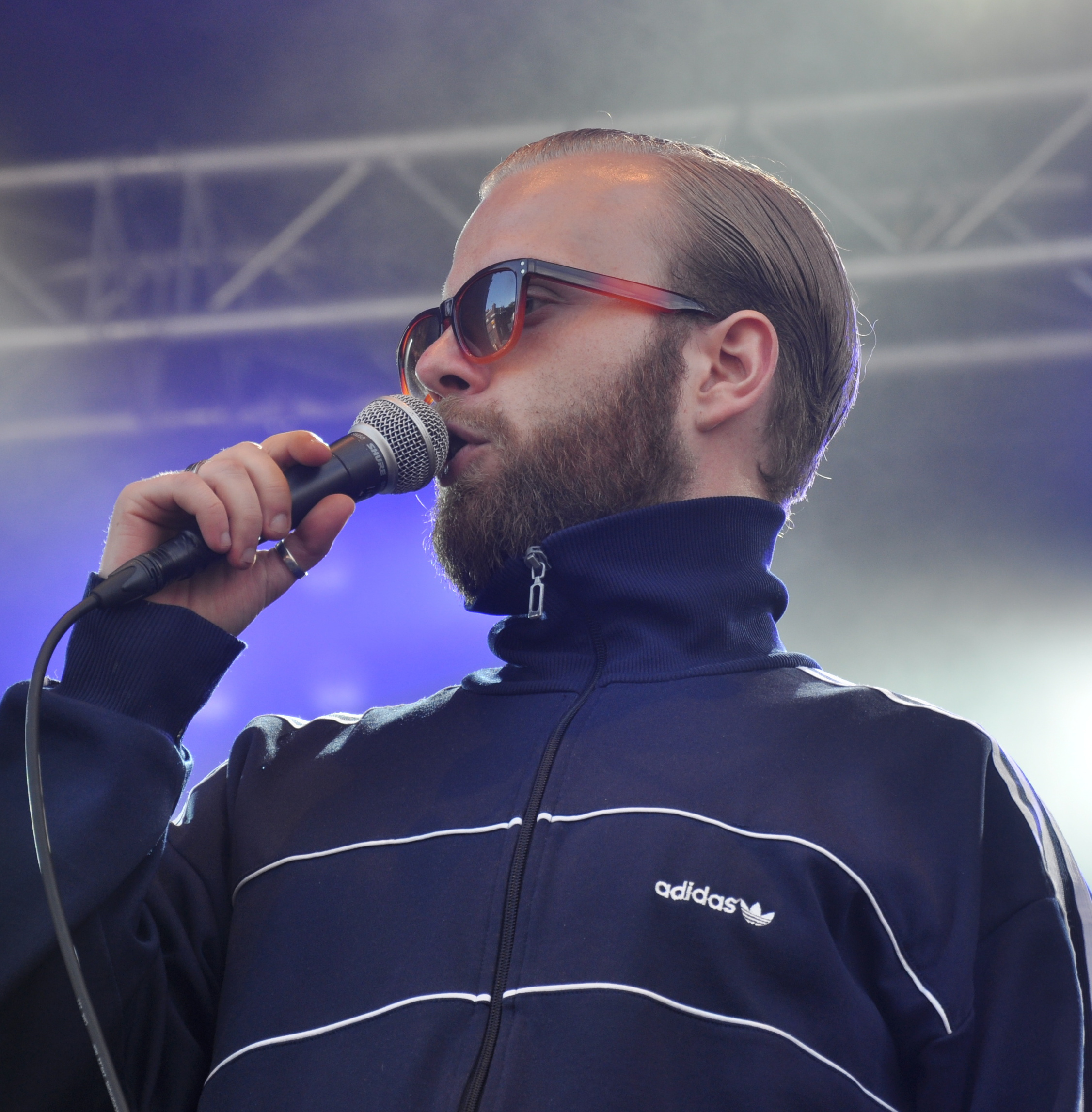
- Ex Tuuttiz in 2015

Background information
- Also known as: Aaro Di Costa; Tuuttimörkö (until early 2020)
- Born: Aaro Teikari; September 27, 1988; Kirkkonummi, Finland
- Died: August 28, 2025 (aged 36)
- Genres: Alternative hip hop, funk, grime
- Occupation: Rapper
- Years active: 2006–2025
- Labels: Monsp Records; Johanna Kustannus

Aaro Teikari (27 September, 1988 – 28 August, 2025), known professionally as Ex Tuuttiz, and formerly as Tuuttimörkö, was a Finnish rapper, music producer, and DJ. He started his career in a group SNTC Family with Crack-Orava, Nunton, and SLTF and subsequently appeared as a featured guest on albums by DJ Kridlokk and Eevil Stöö & Koksukoo. Tuuttimörkö's first solo album On totta was released on 18 January 2013. In the first week of its release, the album peaked at number three on the Official Finnish Album Chart.

Ex Tuuttiz also used the pseudonym Aaro Di Costa when performing electronic music in the group Mad Max Mattel.

== Death ==
Ex Tuuttiz died in August 2025.

== Discography ==
=== Solo albums ===
- On totta (2013)
- Kromihammas (2016)
- Kaikki keil on välii digaa Ex Tuuttizt (2020)
- XT (2023)
- Venlafaxin Cowboy (2025)

=== SNTC Family ===
- Kankkushorror (EP, 2006)
- Puolikas (EP, 2007)
- Jymyhitit (album, 2011)

=== As a featured guest ===
- "Kuse viuluus" by DJ Kridlokk (2011)
- "Yksikahdeksan seitsemän" by Nunton (2011)
- "Streiffaa" by Eevil Stöö & Koksukoo (2012)
- "Tähtisadetikkui rakettei tykäreit" by KC/MD Mafia (2012)
