= RPK (disambiguation) =

RPK (Ruchnoy Pulemyot Kalashnikova, Ручной пулемёт Калашникова) is a Soviet light machine gun.

RPK may also refer to:

- Raja Petra Kamarudin (born 1950), Malaysian editor
- Revenue passenger kilometre, a measure of traffic
- Royal Park railway station (station code), Melbourne, Australia
- Rocketplane Kistler (RpK), a former aerospace company
- RPK (rapper), stage name of the Finnish rapper Roope Kinnunen
