= Khid =

Khid or KHID may refer to:

- KHID, broadcasting signals of KJJF
- Khid (DJ), one of the stage names of Finnish disc jockey DJ Kridlokk
