= Krid =

Krid or KRID may refer to:

- Krid (DJ), one of the known names of Finnish disc jockey DJ Kridlokk
- Mohamed Krid, Tunisian Paralympian athlete
- KZKY, American radio station formerly using call sign KRID
