= Flinch (band) =

Finnish glam rock band

- Origin: Tampere, Finland
- Genres: Glam rock
- Years active: 2002–present
- Labels: Hype Records
- Members: Mikko Häkkilä; Olli Laukkanen; Tuukka Hänninen; Juuso Valkeala; Ville Liimatainen
- Website: flinchband.fi

Flinch is glam rock band from Tampere, Finland formed in 2003.

== Band history ==
=== Initial success ===
The band released their debut single "Tuulet" in 2005, where it reached number 2 on the Finnish music charts. Their follow-up single "Liikaa" was released in early 2006 and reached number 2.

The band's debut album, Kuvastin, was released in 2006 and reached number 17 on the Finnish album charts.

=== Change in lineup ===
In early 2007 there was a significant change in lineup, and front man Liimatainen became the only remaining original member. Commenting on the split, Liimatainen stated that "that group arrived to a point where there was no other choice than splitting. The former band members wanted to do other things. Despite the changes inside the band, fans have remained faithful. Feedback up to now has been positive".

On April 9, 2008, the band released their second album Irrallaan. It was produced by Jonne Aaron, Liimatainen's elder brother and frontman of the band Negative.

== Band members ==
- Mikko Häkkilä (guitar)
- Olli Laukkanen (guitar)
- Tuukka Hänninen (bass guitar)
- Juuso Valkeala (drummer).
- Ville Liimatainen (lead vocals)

== Discography ==
=== Albums ===
Year	Title	Chart (Finland)
2006	Kuvastin	17
2008	Irrallaan	-

=== Singles ===
- Tuulet (17.8.2005)
- Liikaa (25.1.2006)
- Taivas Tähtiverhoineen
- 1986

=== Music Videos ===
- Liikaa
- Taivas tähtiverhoineen
