= Nuori ja kaunis =

Single by Anna Järvinen featuring Olavi Uusivirta
- Released: 11 April 2011
- Length: 4:10
- Label: Universal Music
- Songwriter: Olavi Uusivirta

Olavi Uusivirta singles chronology
"Sydänmaa" (2010)	"Nuori ja kaunis" (2011)	"Nuoruus" (2012)

"Nuori ja kaunis" is a song by Sweden-Finnish singer Anna Järvinen featuring Finnish singer and songwriter Olavi Uusivirta who also wrote the song. The song was released as a single from the soundtrack of the 2011 Finnish film Elokuu. It was also included on the CD version of Uusivirta's 2012 album Elvis istuu oikealla and on his 2013 compilation album 27 suosikkia. The song peaked at number seven on the Finnish Singles Chart.

== Charts ==
Chart (2011)	Peak position
Finland (Suomen virallinen lista)	7
