= Salil eka salil vika =

Single by Musta Barbaari
- Released: 23 August 2013
- Genre: Rap
- Length: 3:00
- Label: Monsp Records Oy

"Salil eka salil vika" is the debut single by Finnish rapper Musta Barbaari. Released on 23 August 2013, the song peaked at number one on the Finnish Singles Chart.

== Chart performance ==
Chart	Peak position
Finland (Suomen virallinen lista)	1
