= Pyhimys =

Finnish rapper

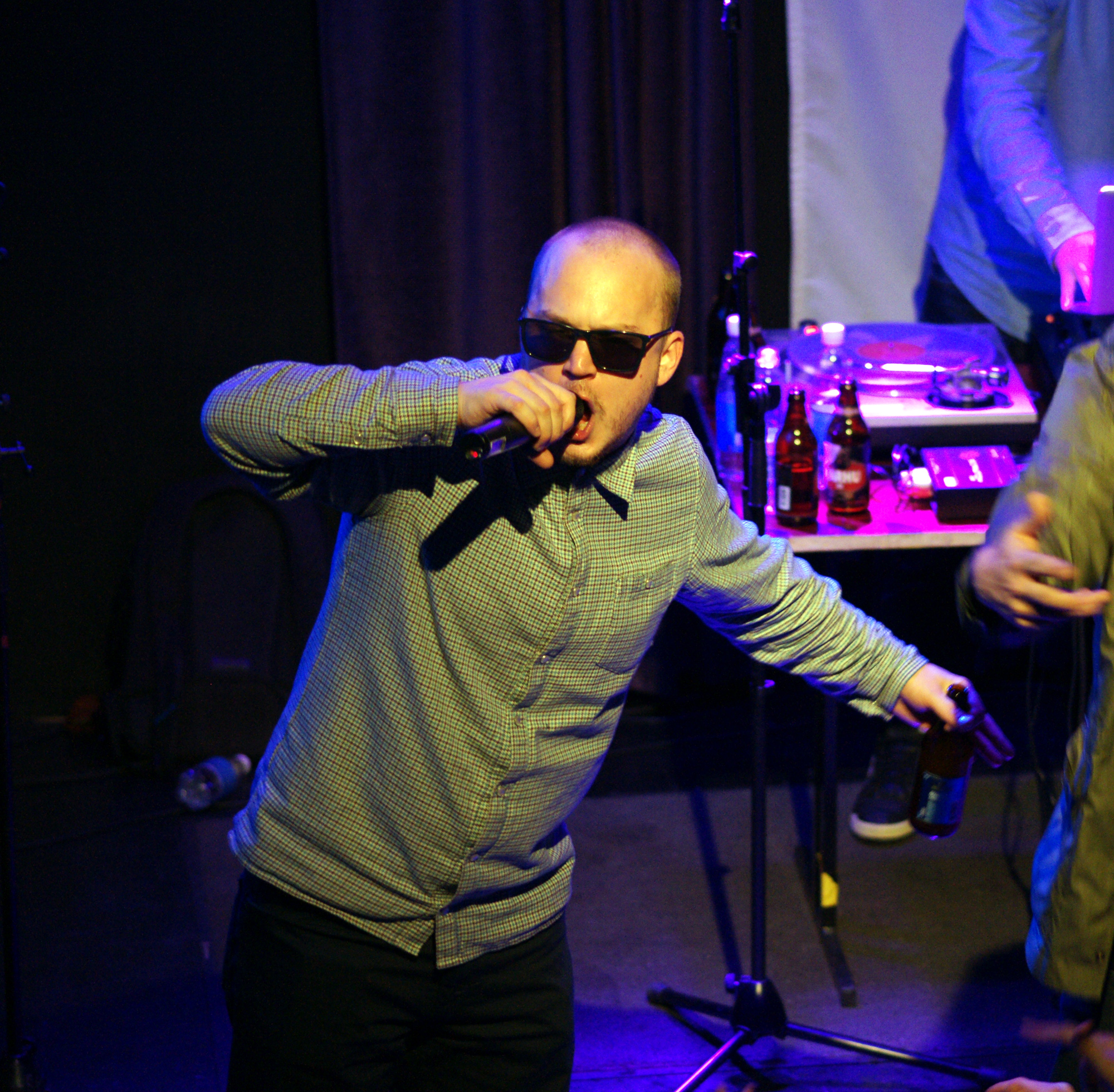
- Pyhimys performing in March 2012

Background information
- Also known as: Pyhi, Miguel Santos, Michael J. Fax, Michel J. Fix, Michael J. Fux, Lika-Aki, Holy Mike, Paradise Mikko
- Born: Mikko Kuoppala; 28 October 1981 (age 44)
- Origin: Helsinki, Finland
- Genre: Alternative hip hop
- Occupations: Rapper, songwriter
- Instrument: Vocals
- Labels: Monsp Records, Yellowmic Records

Mikko Heikki Matias Kuoppala (born 28 October 1981), professionally known as Pyhimys ("The Saint") and Lika-Aki ("Dirty Aki"), is a Finnish rapper, songwriter and founder of the record company Yellowmic Records. He has gained success both as a solo artist and as a member of groups such as Teflon Brothers and Ruger Hauer. He is also working as a songwriter.

== Solo career ==
Pyhimys was signed to Monsp Records in early 2006. Previously he had released independently some material, such as the Tapaus trilogy in 2004 (Poikkeustapaus, Ongelmatapaus and Rajatapaus). His first official release was Ai, tähän väliin? EP in May 2006.

In September 2007, Pyhimys released his first official album Salainen Maailma. The album received generally positive reviews, although some critics blamed it for being too long and for exhausting listeners with too much lyrical content. His second album Tulva followed just six months later in March 2008, and in August 2008, Pyhimys collaborated with a fellow rapper Timo Pieni Huijaus on an album Arvoitus koko ihminen.

In May 2011, Pyhimys returned with his third album Medium, and in October 2011, he released Paranoid, a 13-track album with each song named "Paranoid" and produced by Steen1. In an interview later that year, Pyhimys said that he would be quitting his solo career, although he plans to continue performing with his two groups.

Pyhimys teamed up with Heikki Kuula in February 2012 on an album Katuvisioita which they released under pseudonyms Perhosveitsi-Heikki and Lika-Aki.

== Teflon Brothers and Ruger Hauer ==
Pyhimys formed a group Teflon Brothers with Heikki Kuula and Voli in 2006, and their first album T was released in July 2009. Teflon Brothers released a free mixtape Iso hätä in April 2010, and their second album © followed in August 2010. Their third album, Valkoisten dyynien ratsastajat, was released in January 2013.

Pyhimys is also a part of the group Ruger Hauer, with Tommishock and Paperi T. Their first album Se syvenee syksyllä came out in November 2010, and in October 2012, they released a follow-up album, Erectus.

== Songwriting ==
Mikko Kuoppala is signed as a writer to Elements Music. He has written songs for artists such as Kasmir, Arttu Wiskari, Mikael Gabriel and Diandra.

== Selected discography ==
=== Studio albums ===
==== Pyhimys ====
Year	Album	Peak position
Year	Album	FIN
2004	Poikkeustapaus	–
2004	Rajatapaus	–
2004	Ongelmatapaus	–
2007	Salainen maailma	39
2008	Tulva	–
2011	Medium	19
2011	Paranoid	16
2015	Pettymys	1
2018	Tapa poika	1
2019	Olisinpa täällä (with Saimaa)	1
2020	Mikko	1

==== Pyhimys and Timo Pieni Huijaus ====
Year	Album	Peak position
Year	Album	FIN
2008	Arvoitus koko ihminen	16

==== Teflon Brothers ====
Year	Album	Peak position
Year	Album	FIN
2009	T	26
2010	©	26
2013	Valkoisten dyynien ratsastajat	6
2014	Isänpäivä	49

==== Ruger Hauer ====
Year	Album	Peak position
Year	Album	FIN
2010	Se syvenee syksyllä	–
2012	Erectus	16

==== Steve iVander ====
Year	Album	Peak position
Year	Album	FIN
2013	Olen musta	33

==== Perhosveitsi-Heikki and Lika-Aki ====
Year	Album	Peak position
Year	Album	FIN
2012	Katuvisioita	9

Year	Album	Peak position
Year	Album	FIN
2017	Hotdog	7
