= Eurocrack =

Finnish rap band

- Origin: Helsinki, Finland
- Genres: Rap, hardcore hip hop, trap, grime
- Years active: 2012-present
- Labels: Fullsteam
- Members: RPK; Julma-Henri
- Website: www.eurocrack.com

Eurocrack, sometimes stylized as E U R O C R A C K, is a Finnish rap act made up of Finnish rappers RPK and Julma-Henri. The duo was formed in 2012 with a major album release Huume (stylized as H U U M E) in June 2013.

== Career ==
Julma-Henri (also known as JLMA HNRI, Henri, Henkka, LL Julma H, Jääkarhu-Make, Money, Pepsi P) was previously well-known since 2007 as Julma-Henri & Syrjäytyneet with a number of albums, notably Al-Qaida Finland (2007), SRJTNT vol. 1 and Radio Jihad... Syrjäytynyt vol. 2 (2008, 2011).

With RPK (real name Roope Kinnunen also known as RoopeK, RRKK, RPK, Esaar, Koksukoo, Koksu Koo, Kokkelikoo, Mörkö, Supertuottaja, Rrimöykk, Rumpukone), formerly of Ceebrolistics, the two had started an artistic cooperation together in 2010 releasing a number of works together including EPs, such as Kutsu EP (2010) and "HENRI" (2012). Their third work together Euro Crack EP (2012) is considered a beginning of the Eurocrack project that blossomed with a charting studio album released in July 2013. Eurocrack's studio album Huume (in English The Drug, stylized as H U U M E) was released on 28 June 2013 and has appeared at number 7 on the Official Finnish Album Chart

== Discography ==
=== Albums and EPs ===
as Julma-Henri & RPK

- 2010: Kutsu EP
- 2011: "HENRI"

as JLMA HNRI X RPK

2012: Euro Crack EP

as Eurocrack

Year	Album	Peak positions	Certification
Year	Album	FIN	Certification
2013	Huume (credited to Eurocrack)	7	

=== Singles / Music videos ===
- 2012: "E.U.R.O.C.R.A.C.K." (JLMA HNRI X RPK / EURO CRACK)
- 2012: "Pommi" (JLMA HNRI X RPK / EURO CRACK)
- 2013: "Spaced Out" (Eurocrack)
- 2013: "Douppii Douppaa" (Eurocrack)
- 2013: "Kräkkä Kränkkä" (Eurocrack)
