= Julma-Henri =

Finnish rapper

- Also known as: Money (during Forever); Julma-Henri; Grim Henry; Henri; Henkka; LL Julma H; Jääkarhu-Make; Money; Pepsi P; JLMA HNRI
- Origin: Oulu, Finland
- Genres: Rap; Hardcore hip hop; Horrorcore; Trap; Progressive rock; Dubstep; Grime
- Occupations: Rapper, music producer
- Years active: 1998–present
- Labels: Ähky Records (2007–2009); Mörssi (2010–present); Fullsteam Records (2013–2015)

Julma-Henri (in English Grim Henry) is a Finnish rapper based in Helsinki. In addition to his solo act, he was part of rap band Forever from 1998 to 2001 under the name Money. He appeared in collective Julma-Henri & Syrjäytyneet (2007–2010) and from 2010 strongly collaborated as duo Julma-Henri & RPK. With RPK, he launched an official duo rap act known as Eurocrack (stylized as E U R O C R A C K) in 2012. He always appears disguised without revealing much of his face.

Julma-Henri is known for his lurid and gritty sociopolitical lyrics. With names such as Steen1 and Panama Rayo, he became famous for having a remarkably darker, harder and more serious punk influenced lyrical tone compared to other Finnish rappers, who were famous for their relatively light-minded, punchline-centric lyrics. In the early 2000s, his music and public image were widely associated with anarchism and proletarian activism and he made a name for himself by performing in illegal parties, political protests and even riots.

== Career ==
Julma-Henri began his career at Forever, a rap band he formed in Oulu in 1998 under the pseudonym Money. The band released the single "Mobmusic", a demo EP in 2000. The other members were OeO, Reksa ja Leijona. As Money, he released Soundtrack 2 My Life, a self-financed and independently released album produced by RK-62 and Panama Rayo. In 2003, cooperated with Asa and Steen1. A number of collaborations followed and he appeared in mixtapes and compilations with notable tracks like "Mitä sä tiedät" and "Vaan sil on väliä". In 2004, he worked on Soundtrack 2 My Life as a full album with appearances by Steen1, Tasis, Travis Bicle and Afu Ra (USA) – however, the album was never released.

Julma-Henri found recognition with his debut studio album Al-Qaida Finland in 2005 while still residing in Oulu. In many of his releases, he used the name Julma-Henri & Syrjäytyneet (Julma-Henri and the Marginalized). In 2005 and 2006, he had a joint radio show Bassoradio (a collective project of tens of DJs) with Steen 1 as Julma-Henri & Ystävät (meaning Julma-Henri & Friends) The title was "Free Your Mind" also touring Finland with Asa and Steen 1 and appearing in tracks in releases by them. In 2007, he appeared in a music video with Asa called "240306" (a.k.a. "RikRek"). In May 2007, Panama Rayon and Laineen Kasper reproduced and rereleased Julma-Henri's Al-Qaida Finland on Colin Records in Helsinki with great success. In January 2008, an all-Finland "Support Al-Qaida Finland Tour" was organized assisted by a number of rap and hip hop acts.

Based on this success, he released in December 2008 the mixtape SRJTNT Vol 1 criticizing commercialization of rap. It was produced by Panama Rayo. A number of appearances followed in a series of compilations like Asa's Via Karelia, Aisti & Emeto's Exitus in the title track and Leijona's album Vauhtia ja vaarallisia tilanteita. His 2009 release Outo nauha was a split album with Laineen Kasperi. In 2010, he released the album Psykoterapia again crediting Julma-Henri & Syrjäytyneet and dealing, as many of his earlier albums with social exclusion and mental health problems and the dark side of life. The album was released on Mörssi record label and distributed by Playground Music. A single titled "Kipu" (meaning Pain) was released as a single. After Psykoterapia, Julma-Henri & Syrjäytyneet assembly broke in 2010 due to disagreements and Julma-Henri proceeded on collaborations with rapper RPK (of Ceebrolistics fame) with joint Kutsu EP of 6 tracks released in December 2010 credited to Julma-Henri & RPK. "Kutsu" taken from the album was released as a music video. The follow-up album "HENRI" with 17 tracks from Julma-Henri & RPK in February 2013 produced another music video "Pala". Julma-Henri also contributed tracks to albums by Juju and Jontti.

In December 2011, Julma-Henri released his new album Radio Jihad... SRJTNT vol. 2 as a follow-up to his successful SRJTNT Vol 1 touching subjects of personal growth, recovery and hope from society's ills. The album was produced by DJ Polarsoul and a number of artists contributed including Asa, Jontti, Juju, Konna, RPK, Super Janne, C-star, Akli ja Joska. Three music videos were released: "Punainen", "Radio Jihad" and "Kauppaan kauppaan"

=== Eurocrack ===
As early as July 2011, and prior to Radio Jihad... release by Julma-Henri, RPK announced on Bassoradio that he was collaborating with Julma-Henri on a brand new project called Eurocrack and that an album was in the offing. In preparation, the two released Euro Crack EP in the July 2012. The EP contained 7 tracks including the epominous E.U.R.O.C.R.A.C.K. and the track "Euro Crack Rocks", the latter with Kube, Aztra, Khid, Klommo, Ameeba & Mindman. A promotional website www.eurocrack.com was launched in preparation. "Pommi" from the EP was released as a music video. The two organized a "Euro Crack Tour" to promote the project through Mörss website. The act also announced signing to the Fullsteam Records in cooperation with Mörssi.

In 2013, the track "Douppii douppaa" was released as pre-release in music video form in promotion of the debut studio album of Eurocrack (stylized as E U R O C R A C K). The album titled Huume (stylized as H U U M E) was released on 28 June 2013 entering the Finnish Albums Chart at number 7 in its first week of release.

== Discography ==
=== Albums, EPs, Mixtapes ===
as part of Forever

- 2000: Mobmusic (demo release)

as Money

- 2003: Soundtrack 2 My Life (self-released)
- 2004: Mob. Ent: Live Mixtape (self-released)
- 2004: TBA (full mixtape album, not released)

Julma-Henri & Syrjäytyneet

- 2007: Al-Qaida Finland (Ähky Records)
- 2008: SRJTNT vol. 1 (mixtape, self-released)
- 2010: Psykoterapia (Mörssi)

Henri & Kasperi

- 2009: Outo nauha (aplit album with Laineen Kasperi. Ähky Records)

Solo

- 2011: Radio Jihad... SRJTNT vol. 2 (Mörssi)
- 2022: aaa (Mörssi)
- 2024: Paratiisi SRJTNT Vol. 3

(Mörssi)

as Julma-Henri & RPK

- 2010: Kutsu EP (Mörssi)
- 2011: "HENRI" (Mörssi)

as Julma-Henri vs RPK

- 2012: Euro Crack EP (Mörssi)

as Eurocrack

- 2013: H U U M E (Mörssi / Fullsteam Records)

as JULMA H

- 2015: JULMA H (Mörssi / Fullsteam Records)
- 2016: Julma H: Kuka muu muka 2 (Mörssi Records)
- 2016: Julma H: Musta Albumi (Playground / Mörssi Records)

=== Singles / Music videos ===
- 2007: "240306" a.k.a. "RikRek" (Julma-Henri & Syrjäytyneet featuring Asa)
- 2009: "Meitsi on matafaka" (Julma-Henri & Syrjäytyneet)
- 2010: "Kipu" (Julma-Henri & Syrjäytyneet)
- 2010: "Kutsu" (Julma-Henri & RPK)
- 2011: "Pala" (Julma-Henri & RPK)
- 2011: "Punainen" (Julma-Henri featuring RPK)
- 2011: "Radio Jihad" (Julma-Henri)
- 2012: "Kauppaan kauppaan" (Julma-Henri)
- 2012: "E.U.R.O.C.R.A.C.K." (JLMA HNRI x RPK)
- 2012: "Savuaa" (Juju featuring Julma-Henri)

Euro Crack / Eurocrack single / music video releases

- 2012: "Pommi" (JLMA HNRI X RPK / EURO CRACK)
- 2013: "Spaced Out" (Eurocrack)
- 2013: "Douppii douppaa" (Eurocrack)
- 2013: "Kräkkäkränkkä" (Eurocrack)
