= 27 suosikkia =

Compilation album by Olavi Uusivirta
- Released: 22 February 2013
- Language: Finnish
- Label: Johanna Kustannus

Olavi Uusivirta chronology
Elvis istuu oikealla (2012)	27 suosikkia (2013)	Ikuiset lapset (2014)

27 suosikkia is the first compilation album by Finnish singer and songwriter Olavi Uusivirta. Released on 22 February 2013, the album peaked at number 25 on the Finnish Albums Chart.

== Track listing ==
No.	Title	Length
1.	"On niin helppoo olla onnellinen"	3:53
2.	"Ukonlintu ja virvaliekki"	3:56
3.	"Nukketalo palaa"	3:28
4.	"Sokea perhonen"	4:07
5.	"Nuori ja kaunis" (Anna Järvinen featuring Olavi Uusivirta)	4:05
6.	"Irrallaan"	3:22
7.	"Rakkausrunoja"	4:29
8.	"Oodi ilolle"	3:49
9.	"Päiväperho"	4:33
10.	"Reeperbahn"	4:47
11.	"Minä tahdon ponin"	3:48
12.	"Nuoruus"	3:41
13.	"Viimeinen kesä"	4:11
14.	"Tuhat vuotta sitten" (featuring Pauliina Kokkonen)	4:09
15.	"Pimeä tie, mukavaa matkaa" (featuring Paula Vesala)	4:55
16.	"Sydänmaa"	5:05
17.	"Tiet etäisyyksiin"	3:30
18.	"Me ei kuolla koskaan"	4:10
19.	"Salmisaaren Salome"	3:22
20.	"Jenni"	4:26
21.	"Raivo härkä"	4:19
22.	"Erika"	3:18
23.	"Huomenna hän tulee"	4:00
24.	"Kaiken jälkeen olet kaunis"	3:16
25.	"Löysäläisen laulu"	4:10
26.	"Hautalaulu"	4:32
27.	"Metsänpoika"	6:54

== Charts ==
Chart (2013)	Peak position
Finnish Albums (Suomen virallinen lista)	25

== Release history ==
Region	Date	Format	Label
Finland	22 February 2013	CD, digital download	Johanna Kustannus
