= Malarian pelko =

2015 studio album by Paperi T

Studio album by Paperi T
- Released: 17 April 2015
- Label: Johanna Kustannus
- Producer: Khid, Femme En Fourrure, Kalifornia-Keke, RPK, Aksim

Malarian pelko is the debut solo studio album by Finnish rapper Paperi T, released on 17 April 2015. The album peaked at number one on the Finnish Albums Chart in April 2015.

== Track listing ==
No.	Title	Length
1.	"Mainstream-solo"	4:15
2.	"Surullisen näköiset naiset"	4:07
3.	"Stevie Nicks"	3:38
4.	"& Hendricks"	4:01
5.	"Jumalan peili"	3:43
6.	"Tapa"	2:28
7.	"Sanat"	4:59
8.	"Sä jätät jäljen"	3:22
9.	"Elokuva"	3:14
10.	"Resnais, Beefheart & Aalto"	3:18

== Charts ==
Chart (2015)	Peak position
Finnish Albums (Suomen virallinen lista)	1

== Release history ==
Region	Date	Format	Label
Finland	17 April 2015	CD, digital download	Johanna Kustannus

== See also ==
- List of number-one albums of 2015 (Finland)
