= The Coffinshakers =

Swedish Gothic country band

- Origin: Karlstad, Sweden
- Genres: Gothic country; country rock; gothabilly
- Years active: 1995–present
- Labels: Svart Records; Primitive Records; Psychedelica
- Members: Rob Coffinshaker; Joe Undertaker; Andy Bones; Fang; Rebecca

The Coffinshakers are a Swedish Gothic country band formed in 1995 in Karlstad by vocalist and guitarist Rob Coffinshaker (Robert Fjällsby). The group plays country and rockabilly with Gothic horror themes and imagery.

== Style and image ==
The Coffinshakers are known for blending influences from Gothic and outlaw country, rockabilly, surf music, and gothic rock. Their lyrics often revolve around death, vampires, graveyards, and the supernatural, delivered through Rob Coffinshaker's low baritone voice. Musically, the band draws inspiration from Johnny Cash, Waylon Jennings, and Ennio Morricone.

Their stage image complements the lyrical themes, with members dressed in dark, vintage clothing, often resembling Victorian-era funeral attire. Coffins, crosses, and cemetery visuals are recurring motifs in their promotional material and live performances.

== Career ==
The band's debut album, We Are the Undead, was originally released in 1998 and featured songs including "Black Sunday", "Pale Man in Black", and "Vampires Don't Cry". The album received a positive review in Dagens Nyheter. The group was announced as a performer at Hultsfred Festival in 1999. We Are the Undead was reissued in 2022 by Svart Records.

In 2007, The Coffinshakers released their self-titled second album, which reached the Finnish Top 40 album charts.

In 2022, Svart Records released a deluxe box set titled The Curse of the Coffinshakers 1996–2016, which compiled both full-length albums, two LPs of rare and unreleased material, and a booklet featuring archival content.

In 2023, the band returned with a new studio album, Graves, Release Your Dead, which received praise for maintaining the band's signature style while expanding their cinematic scope and production quality.

== Members ==
- Rob Coffinshaker – vocals, guitar
- Joe Undertaker – bass
- Andy Bones – drums
- Fang – guitar
- Rebecca – backing vocals

== Discography ==
=== Studio albums ===
- We Are the Undead (1998; reissued 2022, Svart Records)
- The Coffinshakers (2007)
- Graves, Release Your Dead (2023, Svart Records)

=== Box sets and compilations ===
- The Curse of the Coffinshakers 1996–2016 (2022, Svart Records)

=== Selected singles and EPs ===
- Dracula Has Risen from the Grave (1996)
- Black Sunday
- Return of the Vampire
- Pale Man in Black
- Halloween
