= Minä olen hullu =

Studio album by Olavi Uusivirta
- Released: 16 April 2008
- Language: Finnish
- Label: Universal Music

Olavi Uusivirta chronology
Me ei kuolla koskaan (2005)	Minä olen hullu (2008)	Preeria (2010)

Minä olen hullu is the third studio album by Finnish singer and songwriter Olavi Uusivirta. Released on 16 April 2008, the album peaked at number 12 on the Finnish Albums Chart.

== Track listing ==
No.	Title	Length
1.	"Löysäläisen laulu"	4:16
2.	"Minä olen hullu"	3:42
3.	"Salmisaaren Salome"	3:22
4.	"Sunnuntailapsi"	4:45
5.	"Huomenna hän tulee"	4:01
6.	"Ukonlintu ja virvaliekki"	3:56
7.	"6:06"	3:40
8.	"Tyhjiä sanoja"	5:19
9.	"Synnyin tappamaan"	3:01
10.	"Viimeinen kesä"	4:09
11.	"Sininen kukka"	5:04

== Charts ==
Chart (2008)	Peak position
Finnish Albums (Suomen virallinen lista)	12

== Release history ==
Region	Date	Format	Label
Finland	16 April 2008	CD, digital download	Universal Music
