= Me ei kuolla koskaan =

Studio album by Olavi Uusivirta
- Released: 28 September 2005
- Language: Finnish
- Label: Universal Music

Olavi Uusivirta chronology
Nuoruustango (2003)	Me ei kuolla koskaan (2005)	Minä olen hullu (2008)

Me ei kuolla koskaan is the second studio album by Finnish singer and songwriter Olavi Uusivirta. Released on 28 September 2005, the album peaked at number 18 on the Finnish Albums Chart.

== Track listing ==
No.	Title	Length
1.	"Me ei kuolla koskaan"	4:14
2.	"Ala vetää"	3:39
3.	"Betonikaupunki"	3:47
4.	"Irrallaan"	3:22
5.	"Rakkausrunoja"	4:29
6.	"Aina siellä"	2:41
7.	"Nyt kun kuljet ympärilläni"	4:28
8.	"Niin kuin eilenkin"	3:20
9.	"On niin helppoo olla onnellinen"	3:53
10.	"Laululilja"	3:21
11.	"Sä et tiedä mitään"	3:30
12.	"Hautalaulu"	4:36

== Charts ==
Chart (2005)	Peak position
Finnish Albums (Suomen virallinen lista)	18

== Release history ==
Region	Date	Format	Label
Finland	28 September 2005	CD, digital download	Universal Music
