= Monsp Records =

Finnish record label

- Parent company: Warner Music Group
- Founded: 1997
- Founder: Keijo Kiiskinen
- Distributor(s): Warner Music Finland
- Genre: Rap, hip hop
- Country of origin: Finland
- Location: Helsinki
- Official website: www.monsp.com

Monsp Records is a Finnish record label founded by Keijo "Kepe" Kiiskinen in 1997 and owned by Warner Music Group since May 2019.

== From punk to hip hop ==
Some of the first releases of Monsp Records in the late 1990s featured punk music, but since then, the company has mostly released rap and hip hop music. Their first rap release was an EP Aina vanteilla by Memmy Posse in 2002. The company's most successful release to date is the debut album Mustaa kultaa by Jare & VilleGalle which also earned Monsp Records their first Gold Record.

== Current artists ==
- DJ Kridlokk
- Eevil Stöö
- Flegmaatikot
- Gasellit
- Huge L
- Käärijä
- Karri Koira
- Kemmuru
- Koti6
- Loost koos
- Musta Barbaari
- Nopsajalka
- Notkea Rotta
- Pietari
- Pyhimys
- Ruger Hauer
- Ruudolf
- Solonen
- Steen1
- Tuuttimörkö
- Ville Kalliosta
