= Olavi (album) =

Studio album by Olavi Uusivirta
- Released: 12 February 2016
- Language: Finnish
- Label: Johanna Kustannus

Olavi Uusivirta chronology
Ikuiset lapset (2014)	Olavi (2016)

Olavi is the seventh studio album by Finnish singer and songwriter Olavi Uusivirta, released on 12 February 2016. "Tanssit vaikka et osaa" was released as the first single on 15 January 2016. The album peaked at number one on the Finnish Albums Chart.

== Track listing ==
No.	Title	Length
1.	"Toton Africa" (featuring Tuomo)
2.	"Syntymäpäivä"
3.	"Kultaa hiuksissa"
4.	"Toinen"
5.	"Tanssit vaikka et osaa"	4:08
6.	"Herää, kaunokaiseni!"
7.	"Kolumbus"
8.	"Tahdonko kuitenkin sut takaisin?"
9.	"Olet elossa"
10.	"Tervetuloa"

== Charts ==
Chart (2016)	Peak position
Finnish Albums (Suomen virallinen lista)	1

== Release history ==
Region	Date	Format	Label
Finland	12 February 2016	CD, LP, digital download	Johanna Kustannus

== See also ==
- List of number-one albums of 2016 (Finland)
