= Ikuiset lapset =

Studio album by Olavi Uusivirta
- Released: 25 February 2014
- Language: Finnish
- Label: Johanna Kustannus

Olavi Uusivirta chronology
27 suosikkia (2013)	Ikuiset lapset (2014)	Olavi (2016)

Ikuiset lapset is the sixth studio album by Finnish singer and songwriter Olavi Uusivirta. Released on 25 February 2014, the album peaked at number three on the Finnish Albums Chart.

== Track listing ==
No.	Title	Length
1.	"En tiedä mitä menetän jos jään"	3:43
2.	"Hei hei"	4:23
3.	"Kauneus sekoittaa mun pään"	4:20
4.	"Auttakaa!"	2:55
5.	"Ollaanko tämä kesä näin?"	4:17
6.	"Rakkautta ilmassa"	3:39
7.	"Tiedän miten tulta tehdään" (featuring Anna Puu)	4:16
8.	"Mannerlaatat"	3:51
9.	"Glorian koti"	2:55
10.	"360°"	4:32
11.	"Paperisiivet"	4:18

== Charts ==
Chart (2014)	Peak position
Finnish Albums (Suomen virallinen lista)	3

== Release history ==
Region	Date	Format	Label
Finland	25 February 2014	CD, LP, digital download	Johanna Kustannus
