= Preeria =

Studio album by Olavi Uusivirta
- Released: 7 April 2010
- Language: Finnish
- Label: Universal Music

Olavi Uusivirta chronology
| Minä olen hullu (2008) | Preeria (2010) | Elvis istuu oikealla (2012) |

Preeria is the fourth studio album by Finnish singer and songwriter Olavi Uusivirta. Released on 7 April 2010, the album peaked at number five on the Finnish Albums Chart.

== Track listing ==
| No. | Title | Length |
|---|---|---|
| 1. | "Erika" | 3:18 |
| 2. | "Puberteetti" | 3:57 |
| 3. | "Jenni" | 4:26 |
| 4. | "Nukketalo palaa" | 3:28 |
| 5. | "Kuollut kaupunki" | 2:46 |
| 6. | "Sinä elät yksin" | 4:43 |
| 7. | "UWV 846" | 0:52 |
| 8. | "Ave Maria!" | 4:00 |
| 9. | "Uni" | 5:17 |
| 10. | "Sydänmaa" | 5:04 |
| 11. | "Nero" | 3:19 |
| 12. | "Preeria" | 3:42 |

== Charts ==
| Chart (2010) | Peak position |
|---|---|
| Finnish Albums (Suomen virallinen lista) | 5 |

== Release history ==
| Region | Date | Format | Label |
|---|---|---|---|
| Finland | 7 April 2010 | CD, LP, digital download | Universal Music |
