= Radiopuhelimet =

Finnish alternative rock band

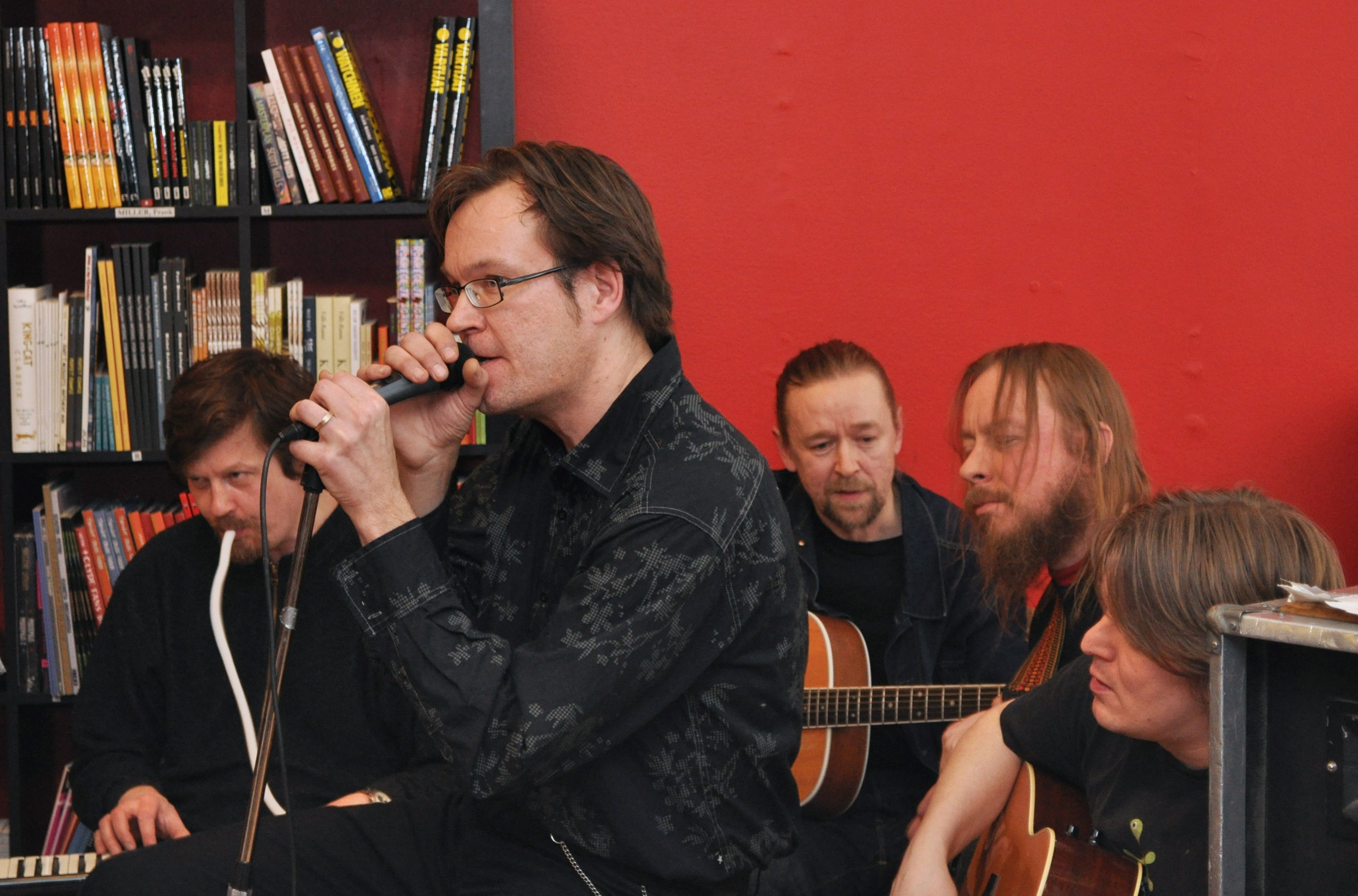
Radiopuhelimet in March 2009

Radiopuhelimet is a Finnish alternative rock band formed in Oulu in 1986. Their style, though varied through the years, could be described as a combination of hardcore punk, noise rock and progressive rock. Aside from performing as a band in a regular sense, they are also known for having contributed to theatre from time to time.

== Early history ==
From autumn 1983 to March 1986 Jarno Mällinen (guitar) and Jyrki Raatikainen (drums) played in Kansanturvamusiikkikomissio together with Antti Penttilä (vocals), Pekka Salonsaari (bass) and, from summer 1985 onwards, Jukka Kangas (guitar).

Kansanturvamusiikkikomissio (or KTMK for short) disbanded after their last show on the first of March 1986. A couple of weeks later Mällinen, Raatikainen and Kangas formed a new band called Radiopuhelimet (The Radiophones) and promptly asked a friend who was known to be loud, Jyrki Mäki from band Ei!Ei! (No!No!), to join them as a singer.

During autumn 1987 Raatikainen, Antti Penttilä and Kari Heikonen founded a record company called Bad Vugum with the intention of publishing music by Radiopuhelimet. The band immediately recorded eight songs which were released as two 7-inch EP's: Sinappia ja ketsuppia ("Mustard and ketchup"), released right before Christmas in 1987 and Tyhjä on täysi ("Empty is full") in spring 1988. The recordings brought Radiopuhelimet to the attention of record company Euros and a deal for two full-length albums was signed.

The first album, Rokkiräjähdys ("Rock explosion"), was recorded during the early weeks of autumn 1988 and was released a couple of months later. The reviews were mostly positive. Rehearsals of new material had been underway for some time when bass player Hautamäki announced he was leaving to study in Helsinki. He played some shows but three of them were still performed with a four-man line-up: Kangas had got the thumb of his right arm severely mutilated at a sausage factory but he recovered fairly quickly.

This five-man line-up played its final show in Tampere in August 1989. Hautamäki settled in Helsinki and Kangas returned to bass-playing. The next album, K.O., recorded in October 1989 was recorded with a four-man line-up (Kangas also plays second guitar on the record).

Meanwhile the record company had changed to Spirit, a sublabel of Sonet, piloted by Riku Mattila. Euros was no longer interested in Radiopuhelimet, probably because sales were not what the company had expected and because the band refused to sign publishing contracts. Euros gave the band willingly away to Spirit. Mattila also recorded and produced the album. The final sound mix was done by Mikko Karmila (but went uncredited). On the eve of the K.O. recording sessions Radiopuhelimet played their first shows abroad in Leningrad (now St. Petersburg). The venues were a small youth club somewhere in the suburbs with a small but enthusiastic audience and a grandiose youth palace where most of the audience walked out. Paska ("Shit") from Helsinki was also performing on the gigs.

At the end of 1989 a new bass player, Eero Korhonen, joined the band and was injured in a traffic accident right away: his vicissitudes with the band started with a two-week hospital period.

K.O. was published in February 1990. The album was received with enthusiasm and the band got to play more shows than before. Hannu Korhonen had replaced Jussi Alavuotunki (r.i.p.) as the promoter. Later on Korhonen was employed by an agency called Dex-Viihde ("Dex Entertainment") and Radiopuhelimet went with him. During the summer of 1990 the band performed in Ruisrock, Dinosaurock, Suviyön sumutus and Nummirock.

== 1990–2000 ==
Recording sessions for an album started in September 1990 in an old factory building on Pikisaari island in Oulu. Riku Mattila was again recording and producing it. After a couple of shows played after the recording sessions the band went on a half-year break while Raatikainen travelled around the world (literally).

The album, titled Pian, pian ("Soon, soon"), was published when Raatikainen returned in spring 1991. Although it received a mostly positive response from the papers there was some dissatisfaction especially on the part of the audience. Shows were nevertheless successful, even though there were no gigs on big festivals in the summer.

Another album, Jäämeri ("The Arctic Sea") was recorded in January 1992. The sessions were much more meticulous and diligent in comparison with earlier recording sessions. This was caused not only by the desire to improve from the previous album but also by the fact that Mikko Karmila was assisting Riku Mattila in producing and recording the album.

In February Radiopuhelimet left for their first longer tour abroad together with CMX. Almost 20 shows were played in a five weeks' time in Germany, Austria, Italy and Denmark. The reception was very good and there was spare time for tourism as well.

Jäämeri was released in April 1992 to a somewhat confused audience. Many people didn't know how to react to the music which had slowed down and gained a "jerky" quality: the album was "interesting" but "difficult". It did, however, find understanding among friends of jazz/ avantgarde, even to the extent that some people still consider it to be the best recording the band has ever made.

The band and bass player Korhonen parted ways in December 1993 due to his other commitments which made touring and intense rehearsing impossible. Antti Annunen, known from Mieskuoro Huutajat (Men's Choir Shouters) joined the band as a new bass player and was run in with a month of rehearsals right away: the band was leaving on a new European tour at the beginning of 1994, this time by themselves.

The initial plan was to have Annunen as a bass player only for the tour and return to a four-man line-up again, but things worked out so well that the final show of the tour in the Seamen's Mission in Hamburg was not his last show with the band after all: he became a regular member of the band.

The tour lasted for five weeks and included shows in Sweden, Norway, Denmark, Germany, Hungary and the Czech Republic. The summer was spent playing shows at Finnish festivals. At the end of the year there was a two-week tour of Scandinavia. Guitar player Kangas could not join the tour due to work commitments and family reasons. Ismo Autioniemi from Electric Blue Peggy Sue and the Revolutionions From Mars played guitar at the tour.

At the beginning of 1990 the band returned to Bad Vugum. Sonet/Spirit had by the time of Jäämeri album become a part of multinational PolyGram entertainment corporation. Profit was to be made and "hobbyists" like Electric Blue Peggy Sue and Radiopuhelimet which brought little money home were no longer needed. Moreover, Riku Mattila had left Polygram as well and no one else in the company seemed to be interested in the band.

There had been plans for moving to another label in the air already. They were mostly caused by the increasingly indifferent and inflexible attitude on the part of Polygram. Especially getting release rights for a couple of songs to be included on an Alternative Tentacles compilation EP called "Hygiene" was difficult.

At the beginning of 1996 guitar player Kangas left the band due to work commitments and family reasons. The second guitarist Mällinen immediately phoned Ray Katz, the singer-guitar player from Electric Blue Peggy Sue, who was living in Berlin at the time. Mällinen asked him to join the band as a new guitar player. Katz asked for a week or two to think about it but phoned back in ten minutes accepting the proposal.

Among the festival shows of summer 1998, a special set of old Kansanturvamusiikkikomissio songs was played in Läsnärock with a four-man line-up (without Katz). The KTMK set was performed also in Oulu in December.

Hiljaista!, mixed by Mikko Karmila, was released in September. It received mostly positive comments but also caused some surprise because of its slow and "airy" quality formerly quite uncharacteristic of the band.

Theatre director Juha Hurme, who the band had got to know while working on Kostamus-symphony, had already in summer '97 suggested a play to be produced in collaboration. The project started in spring 1998 with group discussions and interviews of various band members made by Hurme. Constructing and rehearsing the script went on little by little until the play, called simply "Radiopuhelimet", premiered at the Oulu Children's Theatre Festival in February 2000.

During the rest of the year the play was performed around Finland in connection with ordinary gigs. The reception was excellent everywhere: the audience seemed to like the play more than the music itself. A good example of this was one fan letter addressed "to a band I don't like".

The album Oulu on kaupungin nimi (Oulu is the name of a city) was recorded in December 1999. Riku Mattila and Pentti Dassum worked at the studio again and Mikko Karmila mixed the album. The album was released in April 2000 and marks a return to the more noisy and upbeat songs of the early albums. It received the best reviews since Maasäteilyä.

== 2000–onwards ==
The band has kept on playing gigs and changing from various small labels from one to another. The marginal amount of critical success they might have had has been at times even more marginal, but the band has kept on playing shows and recording albums to this date. Their album "Ei kenenkään maa" ("Nobodys land") was made acoustic, but was considered by the record distribution company Levykauppaäx on their website to be "as noisy and threatening as all their electrical records".

== Members ==
- Jyrki (J.A.) Mäki (vocals)
- Jarno Mällinen (guitar)
- Jyrki Raatikainen (drums)
- Antti Annunen (bass guitar since 1994)
- Esa "Katz" Nissi (guitar since 1996)
- Jukka Kangas (bass guitar 1986–1987 and 1989, guitar 1987–1996)
- Mika Hautamäki (bass guitar 1987–1989)
- Eero Korhonen (bass guitar 1989–1993)

== Discography ==
- Sinappia ja ketsuppia (Bad Vugum 1987, EP)
- Tyhjä on täysi (Bad Vugum 1988, EP)
- Rokkiräjähdys (Euros 1988)
- K.O. (Sonet 1990)
- Pian pian (Sonet 1991)
- 2½ (Bad Vugum 1991, compilation)
- Jäämeri (Sonet/Polygram 1992)
- Maalla (Sonet/Polygram 1993)
- Hygiene (Alternative Tentacles 1995, EP/compilation)
- Maasäteilyä (Bad Vugum 1995)
- Avaruus (Bad Vugum 1997)
- Hiljaista! (Bad Vugum 1998)
- Oulu on kaupungin nimi (Bad Vugum 2000)
- Tänään (Hot Igloo 2002)
- Varmaa hapuilua 1987–2002 (Hot Igloo 2006, compilation)
- Viisi Tähteä (If Society 2007)
- Rakastaa sinua (If Society 2010)
- Ei kenenkään maa (If Society 2013)
- Jäämeri (re-release, 2014)
- Saastan kaipuu (If Society 2016)
- Kosminen tiedottomuus (If Society 2020)
- Radiopuhelimet (If Society 2023)

EPs

- Sinappia ja ketsuppia (1987)
- Tyhjä on täysi (1988)

== Plays ==
- Radiopuhelimet (2000)

Written by/cast: Radiopuhelimet (Annunen, Mäki, Mällinen, Nissi & Raatikainen) with Heikki Herva and Pasi Lappalainen. Directed by Juha Hurme.

- Tommi (2005)

Written by: Radiopuhelimet (Annunen, Mäki, Mällinen, Nissi & Raatikainen) with Heikki Herva, Pasi Lappalainen and Jarno Valli, cast: Radiopuhelimet with Heikki Herva, Jeata Juustinen, Pasi Lappalainen and Jarno Valli. Directed by Juha Hurme.

- Kalevala (2008?)
