= Tuure Kilpeläinen =

Finnish musician

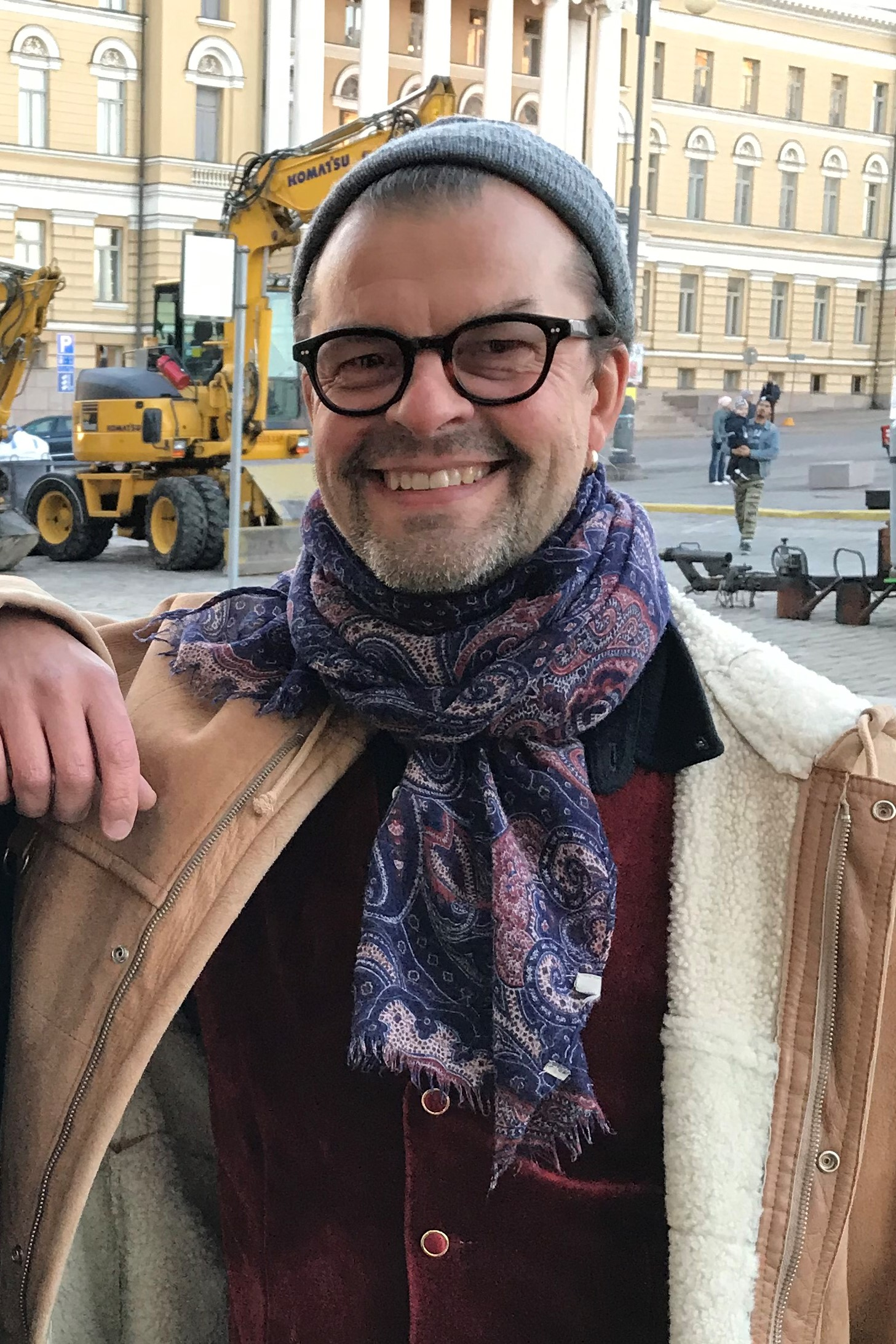
Kilpeläinen in 2018

Tuure Kilpeläinen (born in Uusikaupunki, Finland on 29 June 1970) is a Finnish musician and singer-songwriter and since 2010 signed to WEA / Warner Music.

A solo artist, he has also collaborated with a number of other artists such as Jonna Tervomaa, Jippu, Vuokko Hovatta, Anna Puu, Vesa-Matti Loiri, Jorma Kääriäinen, Kari Tapio and Johanna Kurkela. During Emma-gaala, he won the "Best male singer} award in 2011. He has joined forces with Kaihon Karavaani in releasing various albums credited to Tuure Kilpeläinen ja Kaihon Karavaani most notably with the album Afrikan tähti that entered the Finnish Albums Chart straight in at #2.

He is married since June 2018 with Manuela Bosco.

== Discography ==
Year	Album	Chart peak FIN	Certification
2003	Tuure Kilpeläinen	–	
2005	Just	–	
2006	Kysymyksiä sudelle	–	
2010	Valon pisaroita	10	Gold
2011	Erämaa	4	Platinum
2012	Afrikan tähti (Tuure Kilpeläinen ja Kaihon Karavaani)	2	Gold
2014	Käpälikkö	3	
2016	Surusilmäinen kauneus (Tuure Kilpeläinen ja Kaihon Karavaani)	1	
2017	Kaihon karnevaali (Tuure Kilpeläinen ja Kaihon Karavaani)	18	
2020	Paluu paratiisiin (Tuure Kilpeläinen ja Kaihon Karavaani)	1	
2023	Sanat jää ilmaan	38	

=== Singles ===
- 2002: "Älä revi mua"
- 2003: "Vesitornin varjossa"
- 2003: "Ihoni alla"
- 2003: "Haloo Hanoi"
- 2004: "Lusikat laatikossa"
- 2005: "Turisti"
- 2005: "Viisi virhettä"
- 2005: "Rakkautta ruttopuistossa"
- 2006: "Holtiton sydän"
- 2006: "Jos sudelta kysytään"
- 2006: "Rakkaus murhaa"
- 2006: "Kaupungin suonet"
- 2007: "Vipusen vakava vesivahinko"
- 2010: "Valon pisaroita"
- 2010: "Vaeltava aave"
- 2010: "Lohtu"
- 2011: "Pelko pois"
- 2011: "Ystävänpäivä"
- 2012: "Erämaa" (as Tuure Kilpeläinen ja Kaihon Karavaani)
- 2012: "¡Eloon!" (as Tuure Kilpeläinen ja Kaihon Karavaani)
- 2012: "Tahtoisin, tahtoisin" (feat. Yona)
- 2013: "Hyvä, paha, ruma mies" (as Tuure Kilpeläinen ja Kaihon Karavaani)
- 2014: "Lisätään lämpöä" (as Tuure Kilpeläinen ja Kaihon Karavaani)
- 2014: "Hymyilevä Apollo" (as Tuure Kilpeläinen ja Kaihon Karavaani)
- 2014: "Laiva" (as Tuure Kilpeläinen ja Kaihon Karavaani)
- 2015: "Pyyteetön rakkaus" (as Tuure Kilpeläinen ja Kaihon Karavaani)
- 2015: "Irrallaan" (as Tuure Kilpeläinen ja Kaihon Karavaani)
- 2016: "Autiosaari" (as Tuure Kilpeläinen ja Kaihon Karavaani)
- 2016: "Surusilmäinen kauneus" (as Tuure Kilpeläinen ja Kaihon Karavaani)
- 2016: "Kesken jää" (as Tuure Kilpeläinen ja Kaihon Karavaani)
- 2017: "Tässä memee vielä hetki" (as Tuure Kilpeläinen ja Kaihon Karavaani)
- 2017: "Kai surra saan" (as Tuure Kilpeläinen ja Kaihon Karavaani)
- 2018: "Sateet" (as Janna)
- 2018: "Elämänpuu"
- 2018: "Kahleet"
- 2018: "Rakkauden roinaa"
- 2018: "Jättiläinen"
- 2018: "Tornado" (as Tuure Kilpeläinen ja Kaihon Karavaani)
- 2018: "Elämältä kaiken sain"
- 2019: "Mä oon sun" (as Tuure Kilpeläinen ja Kaihon Karavaani)
- 2019: "Se on minä joka hajoaa" (as Tuure Kilpeläinen ja Kaihon Karavaani)
- 2020: "Rakastan sua niin et se sattuu" (as Tuure Kilpeläinen ja Kaihon Karavaani)
- 2020: "Kaukana kotoa" (as Brädi)
