= Eevil Stöö =

- Also known as: Dead-O, Lehtiroke, OG-Äpärä, Plankton, Tommi Merihaasta, DJ Evil Stö, Eevil (Mvda-Fvkin) Stö, Eevilstöö, EvilStöö, Stöö, Veli Stöö, Stöösni, Öözelivee
- Born: Tommi Liikka
- Genres: Rap, Southern hip hop, Trap, Chopped and screwed, Memphis rap, Hyphy
- Occupation: Rapper
- Years active: 2002–present
- Labels: Fjuu Records (2002), Monsp Records (2005–2018), Katakombi Records (2018-present)
- Member of: Siniset Punaiset Miehet

Tommi Liikka, professionally known as Eevil Stöö, is a Finnish rapper. In addition to his solo work, he is also one half of the rap duo Siniset Punaiset Miehet.

== Career ==
Eevil Stöö's first album Pinkkibikinihinkkichiksi was released in 2002, but it was his 2011 album Stöö of Destruction that first brought him commercial success. Produced entirely by DJ Kridlokk, the album peaked at number 24 on the Official Finnish Album Chart.

On 20 July 2012 Eevil Stöö and a fellow rapper Koksukoo released the album Fuck Vivaldi. In the first week of its release, the album debuted at number one on the Official Finnish Album Chart. It was later nominated for an Emma Award in the category of the best Hip Hop / Reggae / Urban Album of 2012.

== Selected discography ==
=== Albums ===
- Pinkkibikinihinkkichiksi (2002)
- Proud to Be a Stöö (2006)
- Stöö of Destruction (2011)
- Fuck Vivaldi (2012) with Koksukoo
- Menetetyt (2014) with Aztra
- Iso vauva Jeesus (2016) with Nuori Derrick
- Saattaa olla ninja (2019) with KoksuKoo
- 2020 (2019) with Aztra
- 6lack Album (2020) with Pehmee Goo
- Marsipan Wave (2021)
- Puolikas tiili (2022)
- Dungeon & Dragon (2022)
- Et voi pysäyttää meitä (2023) with Stepa
- Advanced Dungeon & Dragon (2024)
- Puolikas tiili (2024)

=== Mixtapes ===
- Pure Ana & Happyhappy Joyjoy Memphis Underground Mix Pt.1 (2006)
- StöKISS (2013)

=== EPs ===
- Eevil Stöön joulumanteli + rusinat (2005)
- Joulustöö (2006)
- Pomo Sapiens (2017) with Kube
- Internetil ei oo tunteit (2019)
- B.M.T (2019) with OPA & Pehmee Goo
