= Elvis istuu oikealla =

Studio album by Olavi Uusivirta
- Released: 14 March 2012
- Language: Finnish
- Label: Johanna Kustannus

Olavi Uusivirta chronology
| Preeria (2010) | Elvis istuu oikealla (2012) | 27 suosikkia (2013) |

Elvis istuu oikealla is the fifth studio album by the Finnish singer and songwriter Olavi Uusivirta. Released on 14 March 2012, the album peaked at number seven on the Finnish albums chart.

== Track listing ==
| No. | Title | Length |
|---|---|---|
| 1. | "Auringon lapsi" | 3:26 |
| 2. | "Nuoruus" | 4:32 |
| 3. | "Reeperbahn" | 6:08 |
| 4. | "Elvis istuu oikealla" | 4:08 |
| 5. | "Sokea perhonen" | 4:07 |
| 6. | "Oodi ilolle" | 3:49 |
| 7. | "Vien sut täältä pois" | 3:47 |
| 8. | "Ne toiset" | 4:11 |
| 9. | "Juoksepoistyttö" | 3:06 |
| 10. | "Kaiken jälkeen olet kaunis" | 3:19 |

== Charts ==
| Chart (2012) | Peak position |
|---|---|
| Finnish Albums (Suomen virallinen lista) | 7 |

== Release history ==
| Region | Date | Format | Label |
|---|---|---|---|
| Finland | 14 March 2012 | CD, LP, digital download | Johanna Kustannus |
