= Irrallaan =

Single by Olavi Uusivirta

from the album Me ei kuolla koskaan
- Released: 2005
- Length: 3:22
- Label: Universal Music

Olavi Uusivirta singles chronology
"Ei mitään koskaan ollutkaan" (2003)	"Irrallaan" (2005)	"Salmisaaren Salome" (2008)

"Irrallaan" is a song by Finnish singer and songwriter Olavi Uusivirta. Released as the first single from his second studio album Me ei kuolla koskaan, the song peaked at number 14 on the Finnish Singles Chart.

== Charts ==
Chart (2005)	Peak position
Finland (Suomen virallinen lista)	14
