= Musta Barbaari =

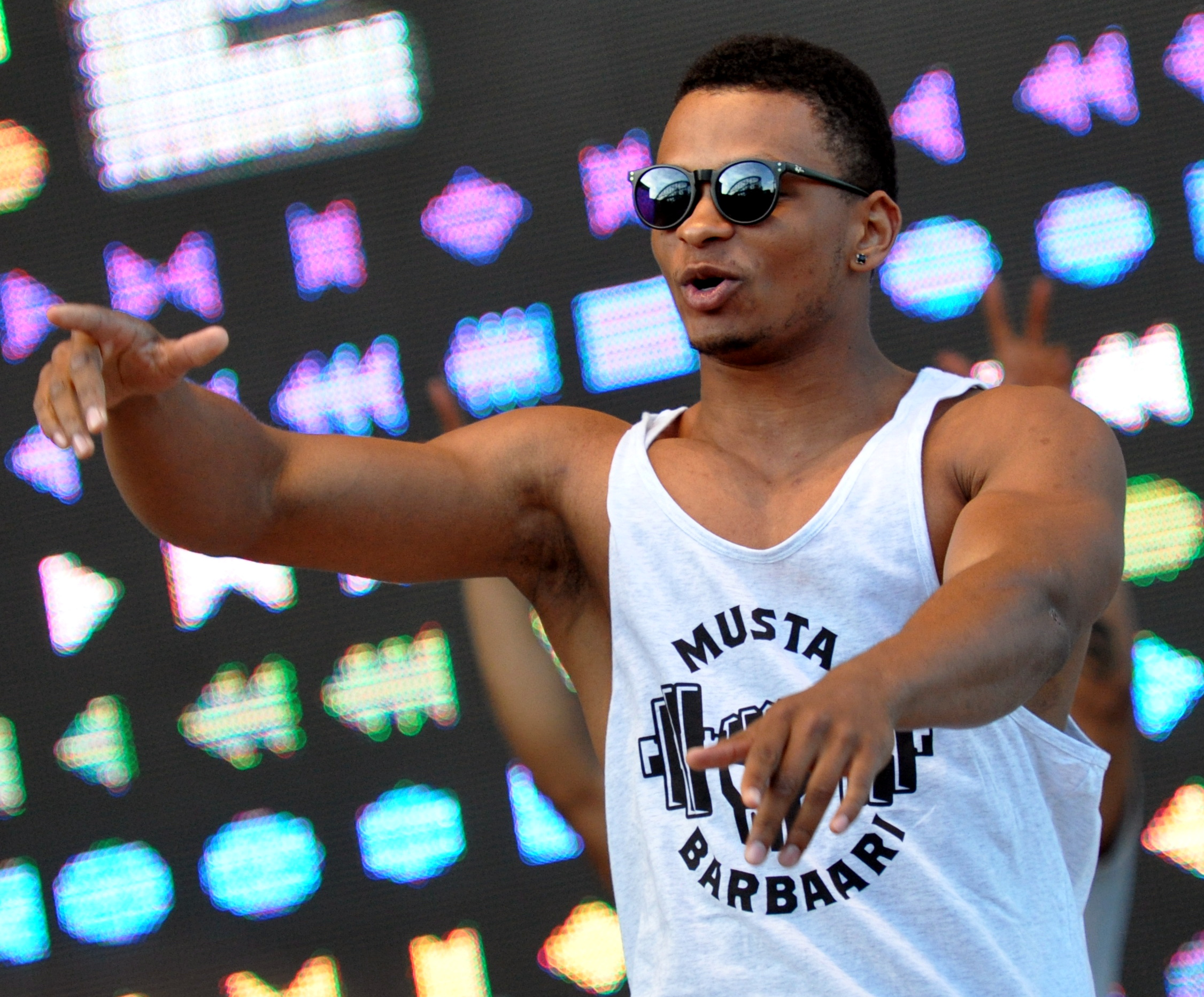
- Musta Barbaari in May 2013.

Background information
- Born: James Nikander; 11 October 1990 (age 35); Turku, Finland
- Origin: Finland
- Genre: Rap
- Instrument: Vocals
- Label: Monsp Records Oy

James Nikander (born 11 October 1990), professionally known as Musta Barbaari (The Black Barbarian), is a Finnish rapper. He was born in Finland to a Tanzanian mother and a Finnish father.

== Career ==
Musta Barbaari started his career by making a video blog Taru painojen herrasta (Lord of the Weights) on YouTube and went on to release his first song "Salil eka salil vika" with the accompanying video in August 2013. The song peaked at number one on the Finnish Singles Chart.

== Racial profiling of relatives ==
In July 2016 Nikander had posted a Facebook account of what he claimed was the public humiliation of his mother and his sister at the hands of plainclothes police officers on 8 July 2016. The post enclosed a detailed account of his mother and his sister being racially profiled by plainclothes police officers.

“The plainclothes police didn’t answer [my sister’s question] but proceeded to handcuff both of them rudely and forced my mother to lie on the ground," he wrote. "My sister asked once again why they were being treated in such a way and what they had done but didn’t get an answer from police. My mother feared for her life and thought she was going to be beaten since the behavior of the police was very rude!”

Racial profiling by the Finnish police has been under scrutiny since the Finnish police carried out spot checks with the Finnish Border Guard on "foreign-looking" people in Helsinki, Espoo, and Vantaa in 2016. The University of Turku is currently working on the most comprehensive study about ethnic profiling that has been made in Finland to date, which will be published in 2018.

== Discography ==
=== Singles ===
Year	Title	Peak position	Album
Year	Title	FIN	Album
2013	"Salil eka salil vika"	1	–
2015	"Kuka pelkää pimeet"	–	–
