= Ruger Hauer =

Hip hop and rap group from Helsinki, Finland

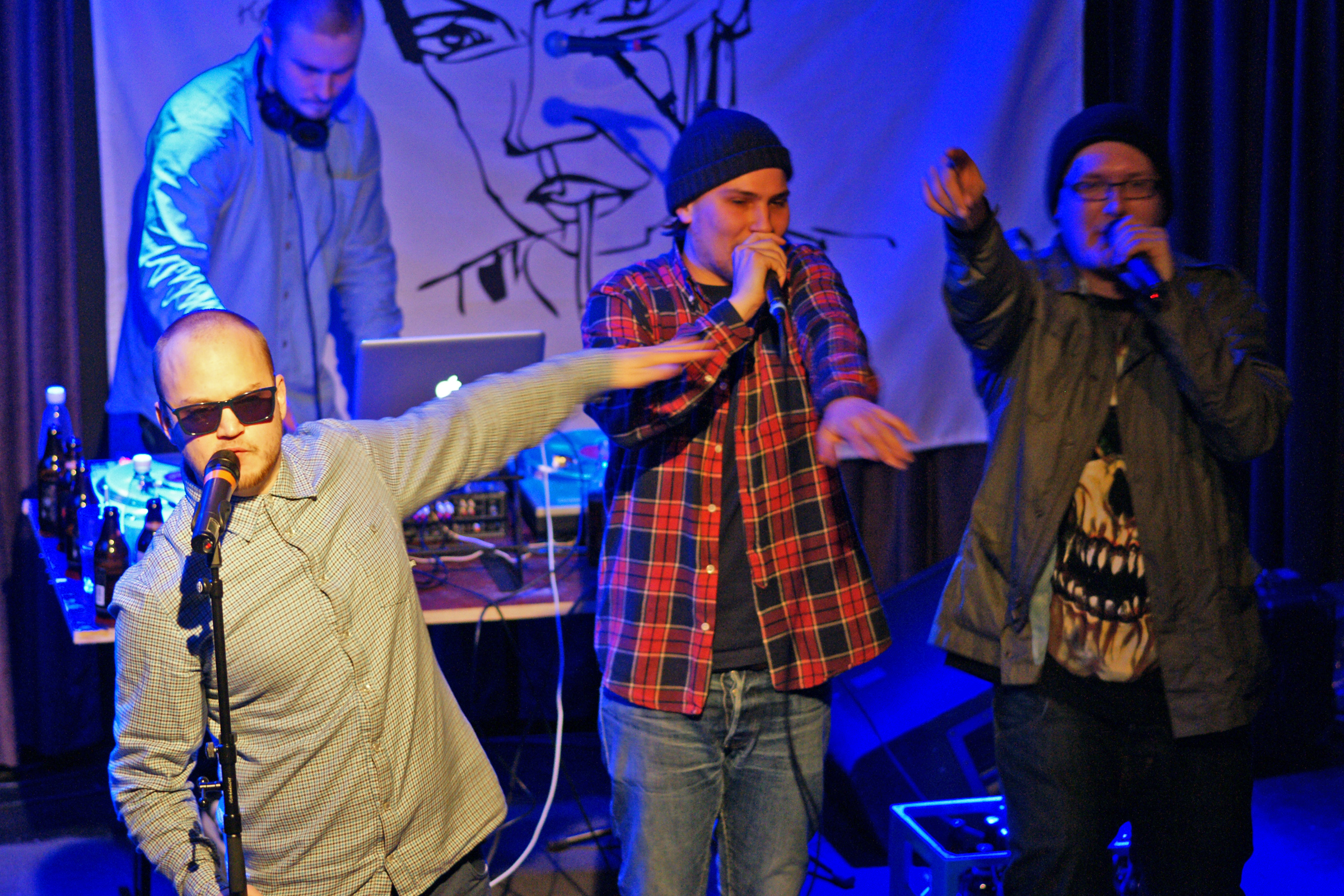
- Ruger Hauer in March 2012. From left: Pyhimys, Paperi T and Tommishock.

Background information
- Origin: Finland
- Genres: Alternative rap
- Years active: 2008–2016
- Label: Monsp Records
- Members: Paperi T, Pyhimys, Tommishock

Ruger Hauer were a hip hop and rap group from Helsinki, Finland.

== History ==
The band consisted of Paperi T, Pyhimys and Tommishock and was named after firearm manufacturing company Sturm, Ruger & Co. and actor Rutger Hauer. Ruger Hauer's first studio album Se syvenee syksyllä was released in November 2010. Panu Hietaneva of Helsingin Sanomat wrote that while the album has its moments, it fails to offer real surprises. Rumba magazine gave it more positive review, citing it as the best Finnish hip hop album of the year. The group's second album Erectus followed in October 2012, reaching number 16 on the Official Finnish Album Chart. In his positive review of the album, Arttu Tolonen of Soundi noticed that the group's lyrics are dark, though funny, and that the sounds of the album are escaping the boundaries of typical hip hop music.

== Discography ==
=== Studio albums ===
Year	Title	Peak position
Year	Title	FIN
2010	Se syvenee syksyllä	29
2012	Erectus	16
2013	Ukraina	15
2016	Mature	1
