= DJ Kridlokk =

Finnish rapper and record producer

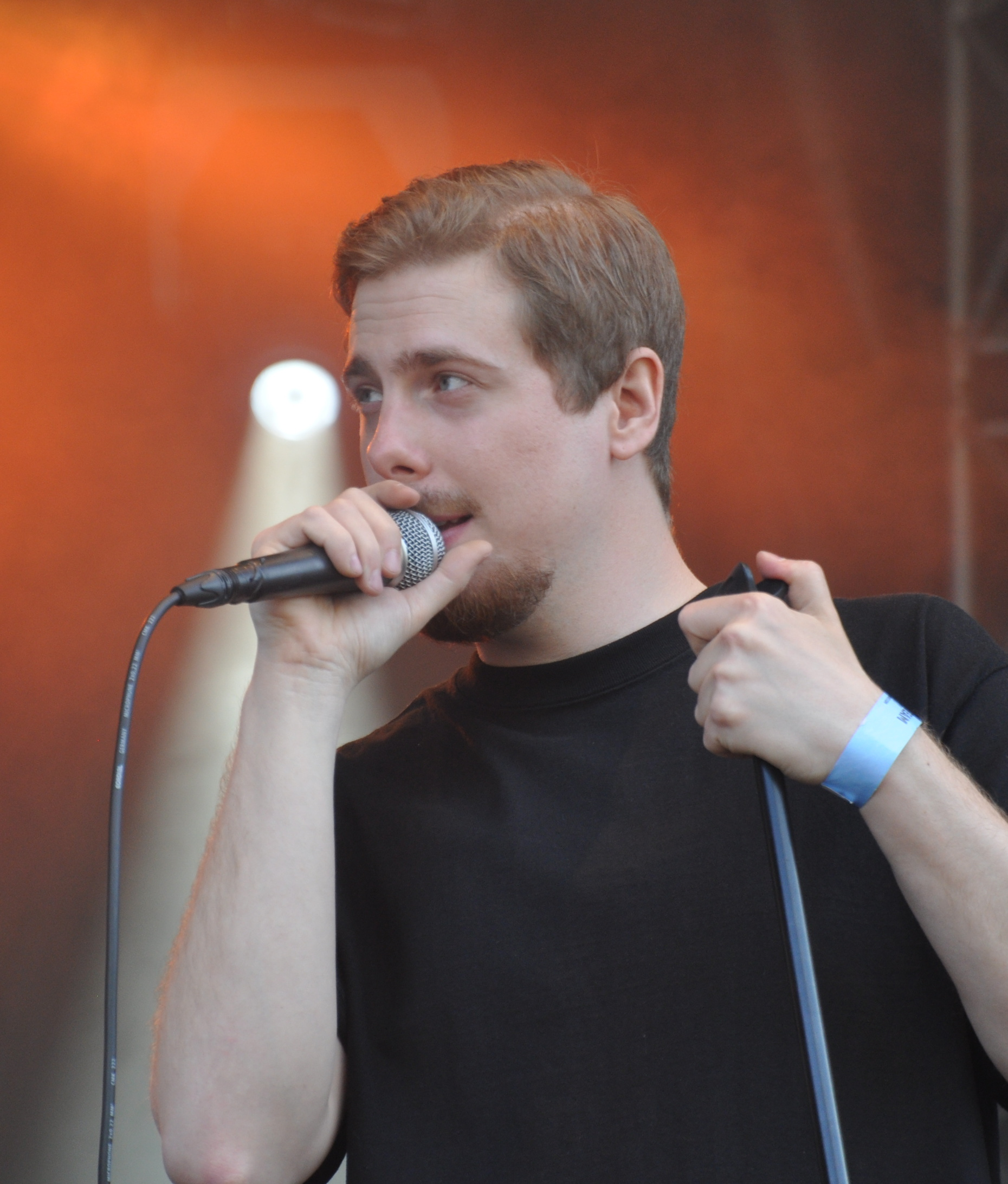
- DJ Kridlokk performing in Helsinki in 2015

Background information
- Also known as: Dead Kidd; Disco Dead Kidd; DJ Kridmanne; Khid; Krid; Kride; Kridmanne; KHIΔNAΠ
- Born: Kristo Laanti
- Origin: Helsinki, Finland
- Genres: Hip hop, Southern hip hop, grime, Gangsta rap
- Occupations: Rapper, music producer
- Years active: 2002–present

Kristo Laanti, professionally known as DJ Kridlokk, Khid, Krid or DJ Kridmanne, is a Finnish rapper and record producer. His career took off in 2005 when he released an album Maanalaisella saundilla with a fellow rapper Lommo. On 18 May 2011 he released a solo album UG-Solo which peaked at number 23 on the Official Finnish Album Chart. His 2014 album Mutsi reached number two.

In addition to his solo work, DJ Kridlokk is also a member of the group Kylmä, and has appeared as a featured artist on several songs by such rappers as Eevil Stöö, Koksukoo and Tuuttimörkö.

== Selected discography ==
=== Albums ===
Year	Title	Credited as	Peak position
Year	Title	Credited as	FIN
2011	UG-Solo	DJ Kridlokk	23
2014	Mutsi	DJ Kridlokk	2
2016	Ohi	Khid	2
2019	Silius	DJ Kridlokk	4

Joint albums and EPs

Year	Title	Credited as	Peak position
Year	Title	Credited as	FIN
2005	Maanalaisella saundilla (Lommo & DJ Kridlokk)	DJ Kridlokk	–
2013	Ex ovis pullus non natis serò fit ullus (Paperi T & Khid)	Khid	–
2014	Ei (Khid & RPK)	Khid	4
2015	Se tuli televisiosta / Sushi Driveby (Khid / Aivovuoto)	Khid	3
2020	HBD RIP (Paperi T & Khid)	Khid	–

Remix albums

Year	Title	Credited as	Peak position
Year	Title	Credited as	FIN
?	C4 Underground Volume 1 (DJ Kridmanne Presents...)	DJ Kridmanne	–

=== Compilations ===
- Redrum-187 (2008)
- Ghetto Tyylit (2011)

=== As a featured guest ===
- "Ontuen" by Murmurecordings (2002)
- "Liikaa" by J Riskit (2007)
- "Rajoitetut elämät" by Saurus (2011)
- "Lainaan enkä palauta Pt. 2" by Eevil Stöö (2011)
- "Euro Crack Rocks" by Julma-Henri & RPK (2012)
- "Ole niinku olet, ole niin kuolet" by Julma-Henri & RPK (2012)
- "Streiffaa" by Eevil Stöö & Koksukoo (2012)
- "Totuus" by Tuuttimörkö (2013)

=== As a producer ===
- "Liito-oravan villejä – UG Solo Vol. 3" by Lommo (2003)
- "Stöö of Destruction" by Eevil Stöö (2011)
- "On totta" by Tuuttimörkö (2012)
- Malarian pelko by Paperi-T (2015)
