= Kube (rapper) =

Finnish rapper

Jussi Tapani Hauta-aho, better known as Kube or also as 2 Litran Juissi, is a Finnish rapper from Hakunila. He started rapping in 2003 and is signed with Monsp Records with whom he had his charting album Lentokonetila in 2013 followed by another album Flow in 2014. Kube is also part of the rap collective On The Street Entertainment, that also includes Jukka-Poika, Julma Henri & RPK, Stepa, Solonen, Sustain, Pelan, Ras Henry & Fin-Jam Reggae Band.

== Discography ==
Year	Title	Peak position
Year	Title	FIN
2013	Lentokonetila	34
2014	Flow	10
2015	Purppura	31
2018	All Jucci	6
2019	Hakunila Killah	3
2021	Gasoo ei breikkei	6
2022	Mennää	11
2024	Neversellout	32

Other releases

- 2003: Cubenrapinat (2003)
- 2010: Kliffaa hei (EP)
- 2012: Kubenrapinat (mixtape)

Joint albums

- 2003: Pumppaa tätä (jointly with Vanha Lahna)
- 2004; Kuberkeikka (2004)
- 2005: Yli-ihmiset (jointly with Rokkaava hevonen)
- 2007: Sirkus (jointly with B-Mäkki)
