= Paperi T =

Finnish rapper, poet, and radio host

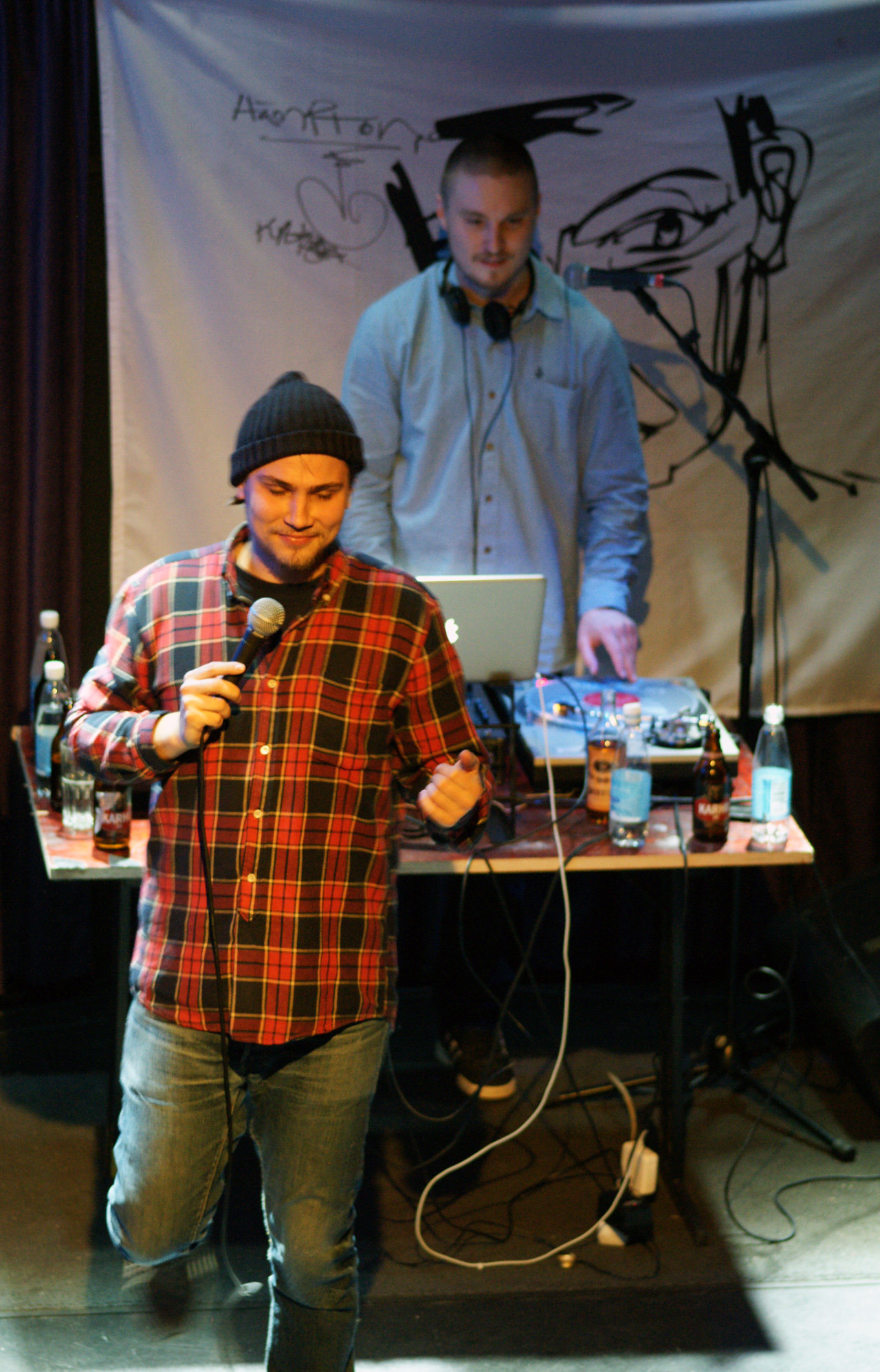
- Paperi T in 2012

Background information
- Born: Henri Pulkkinen; 26 February 1986 (age 40)
- Origin: Porvoo, Finland
- Genres: Alternative hip hop, Spoken word, Trip hop, Indie pop

Henri Pulkkinen (born 26 February 1986), professionally known as Paperi T, is a Finnish rapper, poet and radio host. He started his career in the group Ruger Hauer in 2010 and released his first solo album Malarian pelko in 2015. Since 2017 he has been working as a music director for Radio Helsinki.

== Selected discography ==
=== Solo albums ===
Year	Title	Peak position
Year	Title	FIN
2015	Malarian pelko	1
2018	Kaikki on hyvin	1
2023	Joka päivä jotain katoaa	2

=== With Ruger Hauer ===
Year	Title	Peak position
Year	Title	FIN
2010	Se syvenee syksyllä	–
2012	Erectus	16
2013	Ukraina	15
2016	Mature	1
