= Olavi Uusivirta =

Finnish actor and singer

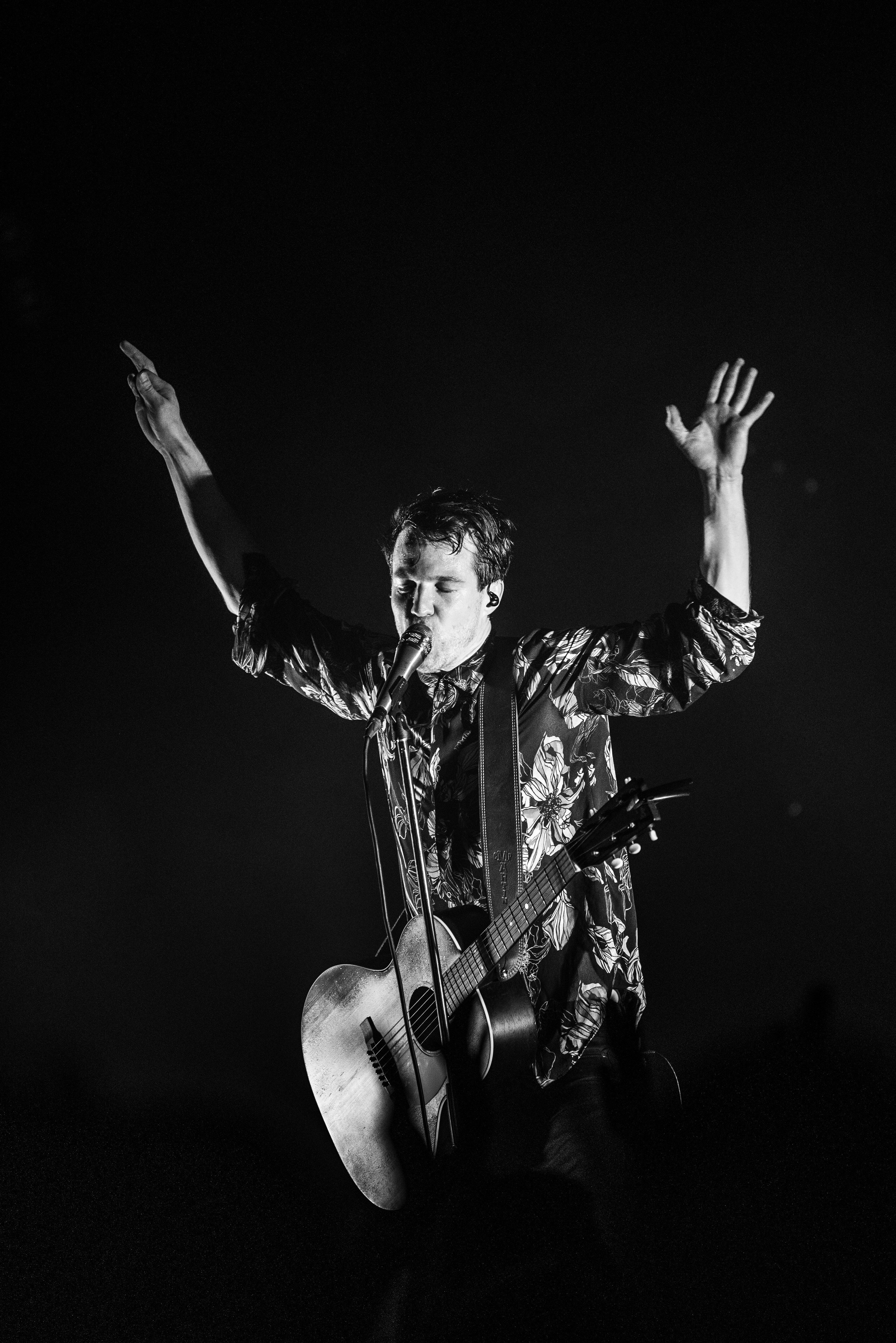
Olavi Uusivirta in November 2020

Olavi Uusivirta (born 28 July 1983 in Helsinki, Finland) is a Finnish rock/pop singer, songwriter and actor.

== Childhood and education ==
Before his school years Uusivirta moved with his parents first to Kotka and later to Karkkila due to his mother's work. At the end of elementary school he started guitar and piano lessons. He also attended art classes and a theatre club that his mother directed. In 1995 he attended the Mustikkamaa midsummer festival in Helsinki where young Uusivirta saw Ismo Alanko perform. This performance inspired him and guided his life more towards music and performing. He also attended Ruisrock in Turku in 1996. In the years 1997-1998 he also attended the Roskilde Rock Festival in Roskilde, Denmark. When his family moved back to Helsinki in 1996 he started at the Kruununhaka secondary school in a music oriented class. At the end of his secondary school years his main instrument was drums, but slowly he grew more interest in singing. He and his friends also had a cover-band in which he sung in.

During his high school years his cousin Jiri Kuronen encouraged him to try songwriting and asked him to provide lyrics to the songs he wrote. Inspired, Uusivirta started to write his own songs. He graduated from Kallio Upper Secondary School of the Performing Arts in 2002 and wrote a recording contract with Universal Music in the spring of his senior year.

In 2002 while working on his first album, Uusivirta auditioned for the Helsinki Theatre Academy and got into the last stage of auditions but didn't get in. He tried a second time in 2005 with the same result and got in on his third try in 2006. He graduated with a master's degree in acting in 2012.

== Career and productions ==
=== Musician ===
Uusivirta released his first album Nuoruustango at 20 years old. "Raivo Härkä", a single from that album was also featured in Bad Boys (Pahat Pojat in Finnish) a 2003 movie by Aleksi Mäkelä. Two years later in 2005 Uusivirta released his second album titled Me ei kuolla koskaan, which was certified gold nationally. From the album, two songs became radio hits: ”On niin helppoo olla onnellinen" and "Me ei kuolla koskaan".

In spring 2008 his third album Minä olen hullu was released. His fourth album Preeria was released in April 2010. Apart from CD's, Uusivirta also sold special, limited edition vinyl records of the album. Only 300 were made and they featured a photograph signed by Uusivirta. In 2012 Uusivirta released his fifth album, a folk inspired record Elvis istuu oikealla.

In February 2013 a bunch of the singer's hit songs and tracks were assembled onto a compilation album 27 suosikkia (27 favourites). The album also featured five unreleased tracks.

His album Ikuiset lapset was released in February 2014 and another album Olavi two years later in 2016.

Uusivirta won the best rock album of the year award in 2016 at the Finnish music awards Emma gaala with his album Olavi.

Uusivirta also worked as a second drummer in the Finnish pop band Soma. He also sang the role of the Shepherd (Paimen) in the two-part theme album Pisara ja lammas by Absoluuttinen Nollapiste in 2012 and 2014.

=== Acting and TV ===
In spring 2002 Uusivirta played the drug dealer "Neppe" in a couple episodes of a Finnish drama series Salatut Elämät.

Uusivirta hosted Zulu, a TV-series for youth together with actress Henna Vänninen on Yle TV2 in 2003–2004. Yle would have liked to continue the program, but Uusivirta wanted to focus more on music and theatre. Since his appearance on the program Uusivirta has been asked to take part in many other music related programs but he has declined each one of them as his interests are really not on TV.

Uusivirta's first big role as an actor was in Keisarikunta, a movie by director Pekka Mandart. The movie premiered in 2004 and Uusivirta played the role of Toni Wahlström. He also wrote and sung the movie's signature theme, "Ei oltu niin kuin muut".

Uusivirta played the role of Cisse Häkkinen in a 2007 movie Ganes about the Hurriganes. Uusivirta also took part in the movies Forbidden Fruit (Kielletty hedelmä) and Rally On! (Ralliraita), both premiering in 2009.

He also tried voice acting dubbing in a Finnish version of the Danish animation Disco ormene, Discomadot in Finnish in 2008.

In 2010 Uusivirta played Rauli Badding Somerjoki in a radio musical Rakkaudella, Rauli Badding produced by Radioteatteri. The musical was played on Yle Radio Suomi in the summer.

=== Other work ===
Uusivirta announced the recipient of the 2019 Finlandia Junior Award for the best children's book. The award went to Marisha Rasi-Koskinen for her title Auringon pimeä puoli.

== Personal life ==
Uusivirta supports liberal and left-wing politics. He has been seen many times actively supporting candidates in the Finnish president elections: In 2006 supporting Tarja Halonen from the social democratic party SDP and in 2012 supporting Pekka Haavisto from the green party Vihreät. SDP is a centre-left party and Vihreät prioritizes environment over profit-making, but has also economically liberal influencers.

Uusivirta married actress Saara Kotkaniemi in 2015. They met each other at the Helsinki Theatre Academy, both part of the MA acting class of 2012. Together they have one daughter born in 2014. They divorced in 2021.

== Albums ==
- Nuoruustango (2003)
- Me ei kuolla koskaan (2005)
- Minä olen hullu (2008)
- Preeria (2010)
- Elvis istuu oikealla (2012)
- 27 suosikkia (2013)
- Ikuiset lapset (2014)
- Olavi (2016)
- Skorpioni (2019)
- Pieni kuolema (2022)
- Camouflage (2026)

== Selected filmography ==
- 2004: Harbour Brothers (Finnish title Keisarikunta)
- 2007: Ganes
- 2009: Forbidden Fruit (Finnish title Kielletty hedelmä)
- 2009: Rally On! (Finnish title Ralliraita)
- 2011: Let My People Go!
- 2012: Härmä
- 2013: Open Up to Me
- 2013: Kalevala: The New Era (Finnish title Kalevala – Uusi aika)
- 2018: The Violin Player
