= RoopeK =

Finnish rapper and record producer

- Also known as: RPK; RoopeK; RRKK; RPK; Esaar; Koksukoo; Kokkelikoo; Mörkö; Supertuottaja; Rrimöykk; Rumpukone
- Born: Roope Kinnunen
- Origin: Helsinki, Finland
- Genres: Alternative hip hop, Trap, Grime, Dubstep, Southern hip hop, Hyphy
- Occupations: Rapper, music producer
- Years active: 1998–present

Roope Kinnunen is a Finnish rapper and record producer. He frequently uses stage names such as RPK, Koksukoo and RoopeK.

== Career ==
Kinnunen started his career in various bands, such as Ceebrolistics and Serkkupojat.

He is best known for his work with fellow rapper Eevil Stöö. Their first collaborative album together, Fuck Vivaldi, was released on 20 July 2012. The album peaked at number one on the Official Finnish Album Chart and was later nominated for an Emma Award in the category of the Best Hip Hop / Reggae / Urban Album of 2012.

Since 2010, Kinnunen has also collaborated in a number of releases with Julma-Henri, previously known for his group Julma-Henri & Syrjäytyneet. This collaboration culminated in the duo Eurocrack releasing Euro Crack EP in 2012 and the studio album Huume (stylized as H U U M E) which peaked at number seven on the Finnish Album Chart.

== Selected discography ==
=== Albums and EPs ===
with Ceebrolistics

- 1998: A Day of the People in Between
- 2001: 0. EP
- 2005: Ö

as RPK

- 2010: Kutsu EP Julma-Henri & RPK
- 2011: "HENRI" Julma-Henri & RPK
- 2012: Euro Crack EP JLMA HNRI X RPK

Year	Title	Peak position
Year	Title	FIN
2014	Ei (Khid & RPK)	4

as Koksu Koo

Year	Album	Peak positions
Year	Album	FIN
2012	Fuck Vivaldi (Eevil Stöö X Koksukoo)	1

as Eurocrack (duo with Julma-Henri)

Year	Album	Peak positions
Year	Album	FIN
2013	Huume (Eurocrack)	7

=== Singles ===
with Ceebrolistics

- 2000: "Hyviä juttuja / Me"
- 2004: "Aintie"
