= Oulu Music Video Festival =

Annual festival in Oulu, Finland

Coordinates: 65°00′51″N 25°28′19″E

- Location: Oulu, Finland
- Founded: 1994
- Awards: Golden Pumpeli Award, Teen Pumpeli Award
- No. of films: 380 (2014)
- Website: www.omvf.net/en/home/

Oulu Music Video Festival was founded in 1994 by students of the Oulu School of Arts and Crafts. The core of the festival is the Finnish Music Video Contest, in which the best Finnish music video is awarded the Golden Pumpeli Award, and the most promising young director receives the Teen Pumpeli Award.

In 2015, new categories were introduced for post-production and cinematography, with winners recognized through the Post Pumpeli Award and the Lens Pumpeli Award respectively. The Finnish Music Foundation (MES) also presents an annual award at the festival to an individual who has advanced the art of music videos. Since 2025, OMVF has also hosted an international music video competition. Screenings are primarily held at the Cultural Centre Valve.

The world-famous Air Guitar World Championships were first organized in 1996 as part of the Oulu Music Video Festival.

The festival’s Executive Director is Juhani Oivo, and its Artistic Director is Joel Karppanen.

== Awarded ==
=== 2025 ===
- Nordic Main Prize: Honningbarna – Rød Bic (Sander August Dahl)
- Nordic Honorable Mention: Roshildur – Timi, ekki lioa (Anna Róshildur B. Bøving, Simon Bendroth)
- The Golden Pumpeli Award: NCO – Ei rakkaut (Heini Susanne)
- Teen Pumpeli Award: Kirsikkapuu – Kirsikkapuu kaatuu (Aatos Ketvel)
- Lens Pumpeli Award: Kissa Uolevi & Sebastiwan – Vierelläin (Hannu Käki)
- Post Pumpeli Award: Sexmane – V!ttu (kaverikarim)
- Audience Pumpeli: Yoki – Oon pahoillani (Timo Vehkaoja)
- Honorable mention: Fanni Tähti – Rosita (Eva-Liisa Orupõld)
- Honorable mention: Emma & Matilda – Sisko (Miikka Lommi)
- Honorable mention: Figaro – Kun mä tapasin sut (Jaro Koho)
- Honorable mention: Krypta – Lasipalatsi (Oliver Webb)

=== 2024 ===
- The Golden Pumpeli Award: Rebekka Holi – Kukkaan (Ida-Maria Olva)
- Teen Pumpeli Award: Modem – Un chant d'amour (Ilona Lehtonen)
- Lens Pumpeli Award: Mikko Joensuu – The Beast and Me (Tuomas Nurmio)
- Post Pumpeli Award: echo + seashell feat. Torus – When a Girl Wants (Joep Truijen)
- Audience Pumpeli: Blind Channel – Where's The Exit (Joona Mäki)
- Honorable mention: Kaukolampi - Chrystal Desert (Timo Kaukolampi, Perttu Inkilä)
- Honorable mention: Aili Järvelä – Elegia (Paula Vesala)
- Honorable mention: Kuopus – Vuoksi (Sofi Häkkinen, Iida–Liina Linnea)
- Honorable mention: Ocelot – Sun Silmillä (Emilia Pennanen)

=== 2023 ===
- The Golden Pumpeli Award: Tove Johnson - Luonnonvoima (MUSCLE HEARTS) (Juho Maurinen & Santeri Laasanen)
- Teen Pumpeli Award: pins.ku - Tapan sut (pins.ku, Pinjamaari Jokinen)
- Lens Pumpeli Award: Babel - Closer (Reetta Saarikoski)
- Post Pumpeli Award: Erika Sirola - All In My Head (Henna Välkky & Samuel Häkkinen)
- Audience Pumpeli: Slow Fall - Melancholy & Witchcraft (Sami Mustonen)
- Honorable mention: Kaukolampi - Inside the Sphere (Perttu Saksa)
- Honorable mention: Pystyyn Kuolleet Hipit - Kohti Tulta (Anthony Putkonen)
- Honorable mention: Elias Gould - Uusia Alkuja (Ezra Gould)
- Honorable mention: ANI - PopStar! (Atte Merikallio)

=== 2022 ===
- The Golden Pumpeli Award: JaakkoAkseli - Peli (Anna Äärelä)
- Teen Pumpeli Award: Elsi Sloan - 18 solmua (Veeti Hautanen, Elsi Sloan)
- Lens Pumpeli Award: Von Hertzen Brothers - All of a Sudden, You´re Gone (Kie von Hertzen)
- Post Pumpeli Award: Aino & Miihkali feat. Anssi Nykänen - Akileijat (Jussi Turunen)
- Audience Pumpeli: Von Hertzen Brothers - All of a Sudden, You´re Gone (Kie von Hertzen)
- Honorable mention: PastoriPike ft. Gracias, Yeboyah, Bile, Kingfish, Sebastian Da Costa, Musta Barbaari - Paa se bängää (Ima Iduozee)
- Honorable mention: Ilkka Kalevi Tillanen, Ollimaine Jäbä, Are - Tappava Ase (Atte Heinonen)
- Honorable mention: VIIVI - Hyväuskoinen (Sam Farage)
- Honorable mention: Peijas - Haamu (Juho Karhu)
- Honorable mention: Mika Hautamäki
- The Award for contributing music videos: Karim ’kaverikarim’ Saheb

=== 2021 ===
- The Golden Pumpeli Award: Suistamon Sähkö - Kutsu (Justus Kantakoski, Mortti Saarnia)
- Teen Pumpeli Award: Cyril Awakens - Atlas (Siiri Selin)
- Lens Pumpeli Award: Cledos - CEISSI (lyhytelokuva) (kaverikarim)
- Post Pumpeli Award: Litku Klemetti - Google Earth Rock (Iiris Tuononen, Kalevi Suopursu)
- Audience Pumpeli: Business City - Seppo Räty Berghainissa (Rauli Ylitalo)
- Honorable mention: Barkin’ Benny - 500MPH (Christoffer Collina, Ilona Salonen)
- Honorable mention: Haraamo - Menettämisestä (Jussi Saarelma)
- Honorable mention: Skraidu - On a High Road (Eliel Tammiharju, Miss Kompro)
- Honorable mention: Ylioppilaskunnan Laulajat - Pohjois-Karjala (Heikki Slåen)
- The Award for contributing music videos: Anton Tammi

=== 2020 ===
- The Golden Pumpeli Award: Pariisin Kevät - Onks se Rakkautta (Juho R.A. Lähdesmäki)
- Teen Pumpeli Award: Kuopus - Sun kämppään katoon (Anniina Joensalo)
- Lens Pumpeli Award: Artem - Värit (Sami Rehmonen)
- Post Pumpeli Award: Kyynel ft. Piän Mega Tuuttiz - Äiti (Ros Red)
- Audience Pumpeli: Turmion Kätilöt - Naitu (Rauli Ylitalo)
- Honorable Mention: Artem - Värit (kaverikarim)
- Honorable Mention: Yeboyah - Elovena EP (Inka Pitkänen & Ima Iduozee & Carmen Baltzar & Geoffrey Erista)
- Honorable Mention: Cledos - TÄN KAA (kaverikarim)
- Honorable Mention: Kuopus - Sun kämppään katoon (Anniina Joensalo)
- Honorable Mention: Pyöveli & Nasty - Jeesus, Mooses & Pyöveli (James Kokko)
- The Award for contributing music videos: Jean-Noël Mustonen

=== 2019 ===
- The Golden Pumpeli Award: Räjäyttäjät - Samassa Veneessä (Kalevi Suopursu)
- Teen Pumpeli Award: GMMT feat. Muumiponi - Netiketti (Juha Mattila)
- Lens Pumpeli Award: Jesse Markin - Jericho (Hannu Pyyhtiä)
- Post Pumpeli Award: Chisu - Artisti/Narsisti (Liisa Vääriskoski)
- Audience Pumpeli: OG Ulla-Maija - Myrkytyskeskus (Nuutti Pura)
- The Award for contributing music videos: Viivi Huuska

=== 2018 ===
- The Golden Pumpeli Award: Color Dolor - Anyway The Wind Blows (Juha Ilmari Laine)
- Teen Pumpeli Award: joku iiris - Moi Äiti (Iiris Tuononen)
- Lens Pumpeli Award: Jesse Markin - Blood (Anton Thompson Coon)
- Post Pumpeli Award: Peltokurki - Musta koira (Tommi Rahko)
- Audience Pumpeli: Sunrise Avenue - I Help You Hate Me (Anna Äärelä)
- Honorable Mention: Femme en Fourrure - Ride (Miikka Lommi)
- Honorable Mention: M - Tehtaantyttö (Sami Sänpäkkilä)
- Honorable Mention: Janne Huttunen - Capetown Boogie Woogie (Teemu Nikki)
- Honorable Mention: Sarah Palu - Koti merellä / Laulu lähteneele (Iiris Heikka)
- The Award for contributing music videos: Taanila Mika

=== 2017 ===
- The Golden Pumpeli Award: Huoratron - XXIV - Crimes of Love (Perttu Saksa)
- Teen Pumpeli Award: 23:23 - Faraway Island (Onni Nieminen)
- Lens Pumpeli Award: Olavi Uusivirta - Kultaa hiuksissa (Tuomas Järvelä)
- Post Pumpeli Award: Pete Parkkonen - Kohta sataa (Viivi Huuska)
- Audience Pumpeli: Eevil Stöö - Oon Eazy E (Lauri Tarvainen)
- Honorable Mention: Roby - Waterfalls (Juha Ilmari Laine)
- Honorable Mention: F.U.N.C. - Nectar (Simo Liukka)
- Honorable Mention: Lasane! - Ruutu (Jyrki Pyörnilä, Veli-Matti Torkko)
- The Award for contributing music videos: Hannu Aukia

=== 2016 ===
- The Golden Pumpeli Award: Mikko Joensuu - Warning Sign (Ezra Gould)
- Teen Pumpeli Award: The Holy - This Will Be the Day That I Die (Juho Länsiharju)
- Lens Pumpeli Award: Irma Agiashvili - In Vain
- Post Pumpeli Award: Asa - 5000 (Totte Rautiainen)
- Audience Pumpeli: Cristal Snow - Love is Blind (Viivi Huuska)
- Honorable Mention: Draama-Helmi - Kukkuu (Helmi Kajaste)
- Honorable Mention: Huoratron - Bit Rot (Kim Koponen, Tuomas A. Laitinen, Aku Raski)
- Honorable Mention: Äänet Päässä Hiljaa! - Uraputki (Roosa Melentjeff)
- Honorable Mention: Pekko - Hunger (Anton Tammi)

=== 2015 ===
- The Golden Pumpeli Award: Talmud Beach - Ain't So Young (Tuomo Tuovinen)
- Teen Pumpeli Award: SOFA - Tyttörukka (Ulla Heikkilä)
- Lens Pumpeli Award: Haamu - Rushdie Remix feat. MNSTRMKK, Kalifornia-Keke, Paperi-T (Jukka Moisio)
- Post Pumpeli Award: Musta Barbaari - Kuka pelkää pimeet (Taito Kawata)
- Audience Pumpeli: Jälkkä - Kesärenkaat (se parempi versio) feat. Robin (Rise)
- Honorable Mention: Musta Barbaari - Kuka pelkää pimeet (Taito Kawata)
- Honorable Mention: Khid - Myyn kaikki paitsi Kate Bushin levyt (Tomi Seppälä)
- Honorable Mention: Antti Kristus - Minä Vihaan (Rolf Lindblom, Arto Toivonen)
- Honorable Mention: Milla Rumi - Ilot, halut ja valheet (Milla Rumi & työryhmä)

=== 2014 ===
- The Golden Pumpeli Award: Le Roi - Lintu (ohjaus Sakari Lerkkanen)
- Teen Pumpeli Award: Olavi Uusivirta - Ollaanko tämä kesä näin? (Mirkka Kallio)
- Audience Pumpeli: Stam1na - Panzerfaust (Jouni Kallio)
- Honorable Mention: Ricky-Tick Big Band & Julkinen Sana - Ne burnaa (Sami Joensuu)
- Honorable Mention: Milla Rumi - Luulaulu (Iiro Hokkanen, Niko Hatara)
- Honorable Mention: Ameeba - Vanhasielu (Jukka Metsäaho)
- Honorable Mention: Jonna Tervomaa - Tikapuut (Mika Ronkainen)
- Honorable Mention: Gracias - Levels (Stream Fast, Die Young) (Ezra Gould)
- Honorable Mention: Paleface - Mull' on lupa (Teemu Niukkanen)

=== 2013 ===
- The Golden Pumpeli Award: Jori Sjöroos & Paula Vesala - Satumaa (ohjaus Teemu Niukkanen)
- Teen Pumpeli Award: Gracias - Let Myself Go (Taito Kawata)
- Audience Pumpeli: Michael Monroe - Ballad Of The Lower East Side (Ville Juurikkala)
- Honorable Mention: Laineen Kasperi - 7 miljardia soluttautujaa (Terjo Aaltonen)
- Honorable Mention: Mariska & Pahat Sudet - Kukkurukuu (Miikka Lommi)
- Honorable Mention: Sweet Moses - Kaleidoscope (Juha Ilmari Laine)
- Honorable Mention: I Was a Teenage Satan Worshipper - Make Your Move (Teemu Niukkanen)
- Honorable Mention: J. Karjalainen - Sydänlupaus (Misko Iho)
- Honorable Mention: Rättö ja Lehtisalo - Spiritismi (Jussi Lehtisalo, Eetu Henttonen)

=== 2012 ===
- The Golden Pumpeli Award: Pariisin Kevät - Kesäyö (ohjaus Hannu Aukia)
- Teen Pumpeli Award: Puhti - Sipiläs (Tommi Kainulainen)
- Audience Pumpeli: Stam1na - Valtiaan uudet vaateet (Tuomas Petsalo)
- Honorable Mention: Huoratron - Cryptocracy (Lauri Warsta)
- Honorable Mention: Von Hertzen Brothers - Always Been Right (Nazal Delay)
- Honorable Mention: Chisu - Kohtalon Oma (Misko Iho)
- Honorable Mention: Streak and the Raven - Speed of Light (Otto Kylmälä)
- Honorable Mention: Stam1na - Puolikas ihminen (Jouni Kallio)
- Honorable Mention: Mirel Wagner - No Death (Aki Roukala)

=== 2011 ===
- The Golden Pumpeli Award: Olavi Uusivirta - Sydänmaa (ohjaus Henna Riikonen)
- Teen Pumpeli Award: Juju - Loppu (Joona Sarisalmi)
- Audience Pumpeli: Stam1na - Yhdeksän tien päät (Jouni Kallio)
- Honorable Mention: Manboy - How It Hurts (Teemu Niukkanen)
- Honorable Mention: SMC Lähiörotat - Yks risti kaks (Jaakko Itäaho, Jukka Metsäaho)
- Honorable Mention: CMX - Auringon kultainen kaupunki (Hannu Aukia)
- Honorable Mention: Haloo Helsinki! - Kokeile minua (Misko Iho)
- Honorable Mention: Husky Rescue - Fast Lane (Antony Bentley)
- Honorable Mention: Zebra and Snake - Big Bad Drummer (Juho Risto Aukusti Lähdesmäki)

=== 2010 ===
- The Golden Pumpeli Award: I Was A Teenage Satan Worshipper - Amsterdamned (ohjaus Teemu Niukkanen)
- Teen Pumpeli Award: Jesse - Odotin ihmettä (Mikko Mällinen)
- Audience Pumpeli: Stam1na - Pakkolasku (Tuomas Petsalo)
- Honorable Mention: Jukka Ässä - Paha maa (Teemu Niukkanen)
- Honorable Mention: Femme en Fourrure - Plump Bisquit (Miikka Lommi)
- Honorable Mention: PMMP - Valitusvirsi (Mika Kurvinen)
- Honorable Mention: Olavi Uusivirta - Uni (Wille Hyvönen)
- Honorable Mention: Raptori - Tosi tarttuva täytebiisi 16 (Markus Virpiö)
- Honorable Mention: Husky Rescue - They are coming (Pete Riski)

=== 2009 ===
- The Golden Pumpeli Award: Eleanoora Rosenholm - Ambulanssikuskitar (ohjaus Pete Veijalainen)
- Teen Pumpeli Award: Regina - Tapaa minut aamulla (Iiro Hokkanen)
- Audience Pumpeli: Cheek - Jos mä oisin sä (Wille Hyvönen)
- Honorable Mention: Don Johnson Big Band - L.L.H (Aleksi Koskinen, Akseli Tuomivaara)
- Honorable Mention: Eleanoora Rosenholm - Maailmanloppu (Sami Sänpäkkilä, Mika Rättö)
- Honorable Mention: Zebra and Snake - Colors (Miikka Lommi)
- Honorable Mention: Elk - Hot Breathing (Aleksi Koskinen, Akseli Tuomivaara)
- Honorable Mention: Medeia - Cold Embrace (Medeia)
- Honorable Mention: Kotiteollisuus - Mahtisanat (Antti Hyyrynen)

=== 2008 ===
- The Golden Pumpeli Award: Stam1na - Lääke (ohjaus Jouni Kallio)
- Teen Pumpeli Award: The Gambit - Snake Styles [jungle rattle] (Magdalena Spiik)
- Audience Pumpeli: Nightwish - The Islander (Stobe Harju)
- Honorable Mention: The Millioners - Body Into Us (Jotti Taival)
- Honorable Mention: Huoratron - $$ Troopers (Las Palmas)
- Honorable Mention: Iiwanajulma - Absinttia (Henrik Mennander)
- Honorable Mention: Pintandwefall - Somewhere I´d Be Worshipper (My Lovin´ Martian)
- Honorable Mention: Pooma - Snow (Jussi Kemppainen)
- Honorable Mention: Stig Dogg - VadelmaSuklaa (Pete Veijalainen)

=== 2007 ===
- The Golden Pumpeli Award: Montevideo - Come Clean (ohjaus Las Palmas -ohjaajakollektiivi)
- Teen Pumpeli Award: Moses Hazy - Suck My Elbow (J-M Kenttälä, Petra Pöyliö)
- Audience Pumpeli: Montevideo - Come Clean (ohjaus Las Palmas -ohjaajakollektiivi)
- Honorable Mention: Ruoska - Mies yli laidan (Henrik Mennander)
- Honorable Mention: PMMP - Joku raja (Miikka Lommi)
- Honorable Mention: Timo Rautiainen - Outolintu (Vesa-Matti Vainio)
- Honorable Mention: Déclassé - Shadows (Kari Salmi, RK Jenny)
- Honorable Mention: Pariisin kevät - Samoilla raitella (Veera Luhtala)
- Honorable Mention: Deep Insight - New Day (Akseli Tuomivaara)

=== 2006 ===
- The Golden Pumpeli Award: Magyar Posse - Whirlpool of Terror and Tension (ohjaus Lauri Warsta ja Jouni Karttunen)
- Teen Pumpeli Award: Velcra - Memory Loss (Chrzu)
- Audience Pumpeli: Magyar Posse - Whirlpool Of Terror And Tension (ohjaus Lauri Warsta ja Jouni Karttunen)
- Honorable Mention: Don Johnson Big Band - Road (Akseli Tuomivaara)
- Honorable Mention: Aavikko - Una Lira Soluzione (Matleena Jänis, Emilia Lehtinen)
- Honorable Mention: Ninja - Fashion (Miikka Lommi)
- Honorable Mention: Lodger - Satan (Hannes Häyhä)
- Honorable Mention: Leningrad Cowboys - You're My Heart, You're My Soul (Teemu Auersalo)
- Honorable Mention: Zarkus - Huudetaan (Jussi-Petteri Kemppainen)

=== 2005 ===
- The Golden Pumpeli Award: PMMP - Päiväkoti (ohjaus Finn Andersson)
- Teen Pumpeli Award: Trio Tetris - Tattarmosshen (Anu Liikkanen)
- Audience Pumpeli: Disco Ensemble - Drop Dead Casanova (Lauri Warsta, Jouni Karttunen)
- Honorable Mention: Kotiteollisuus - Kaihola (Tommi Karvinen)
- Honorable Mention: Quintessence - Delirous (Vesa Manninen)
- Honorable Mention: Kotiteollisuus - Vieraan sanomaa (Sami Parkkinen, Jaakko Kilpiäinen)
- Honorable Mention: Husky Rescue - New Light Of Tomorrow (Pete Riski)
- Honorable Mention: Zen Cafe - Taivas on kirkas ja napakka (Pete Veijalainen)
- Honorable Mention: Disco Ensemble - Drop Dead Casanova (Lauri Warsta, Jouni Karttunen)

=== 2004 ===
- The Golden Pumpeli Award: Sweatmaster - Song with No Words (ohjaus Kalle Kotila ja Tomi Malakias)
- Teen Pumpeli Award: Steen1 - Jarden träkki (Antti Salminen, Saija Salonen)
- Audience Pumpeli: Sweatmaster - Song with No Words (ohjaus Kalle Kotila ja Tomi Malakias)
- Honorable Mention: DJ Slow - Keep Moving (Miikka Lommi)
- Honorable Mention: The Crash - Still Alive (Tommi Pietiläinen)
- Honorable Mention: Zen Café - Piha ilman sadettajaa (Pete Veijalainen)
- Honorable Mention: Elastinen - Syljen (Jani Tolin)
- Honorable Mention: Lodger - I Love Death (Hannes Häyhä)
- Honorable Mention: Husky Rescue - City Lights (Miikka Lommi)

=== 2003 ===
- The Golden Pumpeli Award: Lodger - Doorsteps (ohjaus Hannes Häyhä)
- Teen Pumpeli Award: Markus Castrén - Here With Me (Teemu Niukkanen)
- Audience Pumpeli: Lodger - Doorsteps (ohjaus Hannes Häyhä)
- Honorable Mention: Willycranes - Woops 25 (Arn-Henrik Blomqvist)
- Honorable Mention: Amorphis - Evil Inside (Taku Kaskela)
- Honorable Mention: Fintelligens - En vaihtais päivääkään (Kusti Manninen)
- Honorable Mention: Scandinavian Music Group - Ei mun oo hyvä olla yksin (Tommi Mattila)
- Honorable Mention: Au Pair - Juhlat (J-P Passi, Tomi Tuomaala)
- Honorable Mention: Infekto - Miami Treble (Lauri Warsta, Jouni Karttunen, Kotila Kalle)

=== 2002 ===
- The Golden Pumpeli Award: Kemopetrol - Goodbye (ohjaus Miikka Lommi)
- Teen Pumpeli Award: Loudtribe - Rocketfuel (Lauri Warsta, Jouni Karttunen)
- Audience Pumpeli: Ruotomieli - Kivinen tie (Vesa Rönty)
- Honorable Mention: The Crash - Lauren caught my eye (Tommi Pietiläinen)
- Honorable Mention: Lordi - Would You Love a Monsterman (Pete Riski)
- Honorable Mention: Kotiteollisuus - Rakastaa/Ei rakasta (Pete Veijalainen)
- Honorable Mention: Kemopetrol - Saw It On Tv (Teemu Nikki)
- Honorable Mention: The Odorants - This Night (Jaakko Slotte)
- Honorable Mention: Iiwana Julma - Tilkkutäkki (Tommi Karvinen)

=== 2001 ===
- The Golden Pumpeli Award: Op:l Bastards - Scorpius (ohjaus Jon Sundell)
- Teen Pumpeli Award: Tulenkantajat - Rollofunk (Petri Kyttälä)
- Audience Pumpeli: Prof. Heikerö - Join niin (Jari Leinonen)
- Honorable Mention: Kukka - Hot Light (Jukka Kärkkäinen)
- Honorable Mention: Marlo - Dust (Miikka Lommi)
- Honorable Mention: Ismo Alanko Säätiö - Sisäinen solarium (Teemu Nikki)
- Honorable Mention: Manboy - A Bore (Pasi Pauni)
- Honorable Mention: Paleface - Back to Square One (Tommi Pietiläinen)
- Honorable Mention: Z-MC - The Drum and The Bass (Pete Riski)

=== 2000 ===
- The Golden Pumpeli Award: Disco - Ilkeitä asioita (ohjaus Finn Andersson)
- Audience Pumpeli: Nylon Beat - Syytön (Pete Riski)
- Special Honorable Mention: Pauli Hanhiniemen perunateatteri - Vieraslista (Teemu Nikki)
- Special Honorable Mention: Giant Robot - Jennifer Kissed Me (Kaisa Penttilä)
- Honorable Mention: Fintelligens - Voittamaton (Miikka Lommi)
- Honorable Mention: Apulanta - Odotus (Tuukka Temonen)
- Honorable Mention: Seremoniamestari - Ihana päivä (Tomi Yli-Suvanto)

=== 1999 ===
- The Golden Pumpeli Award: The Crash - Sugared (ohjaus Tommi Pietiläinen)
- The Public Pumpeli Award: The Crash - Sugared (ohjaus Tommi Pietiläinen)
- Honorable Mention: The Rasmus - Liquid (Viljami Eronen)
- Honorable Mention: Neomarkka - Yksi kahdelle (Mikko Hilke, Jukka Salonen, Hermanni Yli-Tapsa)
- Honorable Mention: Jonna Tervomaa - En sinulta rauhaa saa (Sökö Kaukoranta)
- Honorable Mention: Supperheads - Heavenly High (Pete Riski)
- Honorable Mention: Egotrippi - Ulkopuolella (Kie von Hertzen)

=== 1998 ===
- The Golden Pumpeli Award: Aavikko - El Cebo/Panama (Esa Nissi, J-P Passi ja Pasi Pirttiaho)
- Audience Pumpeli: Pipoz - Here we go (Jaakko Saurama)
- Special Honorable Mention: Ultra Bra - Sinä lähdit pois (Aleksi Bardy)
- Special Honorable Mention: Bomfunk Mc's - Uprocking beats (Miikka Lommi)
- Special Honorable Mention: Apulanta - Mitä vaan (Tuukka Temonen)
- Honorable Mention: Come Inside - Hold Me Now (Pete Riski)
- Honorable Mention: Jimi Tenor - Midsummernight (Sökö Kaukoranta)
- Honorable Mention: Apocalyptica - Harmageddon (Kare Hellén)
- Honorable Mention: Kotiteollisuus - Routa ei lopu (Miikko Oikkonen)

=== 1997 ===
- The Golden Pumpeli Award: Aknestik - Neptunus (Jukka Takalo)
- Audience Pumpeli: Tjad & Jasupehmo - Avaruuslimonadi (Antti Haaranen, Jaakko Huuki)
- Honorable Mention: Aki Sirkesalo - Seksuaalista häirintää (Sökö Kaukoranta)
- Honorable Mention: Arto Tamminen - Utopia (Pete Riski)
- Honorable Mention: Waldo - The Look (Marko Antila)
- Honorable Mention: Sound of R.E.L.S. - Crazy Music (Sökö Kaukoranta, Hector Abaunza-Canales)

=== 1996 ===
- The Golden Pumpeli Award: Rinneradio - Aromaa Alt Too (Michael Aston)
- Audience Pumpeli: The Leo Bugariloves - Lämmöllä ja antaumuksella (Tuija Karén)
- Honorable Mention: Generators - Rearrange (Mikko Pitkänen)
- Honorable Mention: Don Huonot & Sub Urban Tribe - Sirkuksessa (Kie von Hertzen)
- Honorable Mention: Don Huonot - Seireeni (Aulis Moisio, Tommi Tikka)
- Honorable Mention: Jasse Kesti - Minimal rain (Kari Mankinen)
- Honorable Mention: 22-Pistepirkko - Don't play cello (jello mix) (Mika Ronkainen)
- Honorable Mention: Circle - Valerian (Mika Taanila)
- Honorable Mention: Nylon Beat - Lä-lä-lä (Pete Riski)

=== 1995 ===
- The Golden Pumpeli Award: 22-Pistepirkko - (Just a) Little Bit More (Mika Taanila)
- Audience Pumpeli: The Leo Bugariloves - Viiden tuulen lakki (Tuija Karén)
- Honorable Mention: The Insult that made a man out of mac - Underhygiene (Heikki Paulaharju, Mikko Pitkänen)
- Honorable Mention: Supperheads - Twentysomething (Pete Riski)
- Honorable Mention: Sick Things International - Dive (Heikki Paulaharju, Mikko Pitkänen)
- Honorable Mention: Waldo - It´s About Time (Eppu Kärki)
- Honorable Mention: 22-Pistepirkko - Gimme Some Water (Mika Taanila, Asko Keränen)
- Honorable Mention: Sweetheart - Life among cannibals (Kimmo Schroderus)
- Honorable Mention: Werner Vorman rautasirkus - Ligeia (Tomi Jarva, Anssi Puisto)

=== 1994 ===
- The Golden Pumpeli Award: Barnhill Boys - Greasy Raymond (Pekka Turunen)
- Audience Pumpeli: Brüssel Kaupallinen - Kivinen kosteus (Jukka Takalo)
- The Kid Pumpeli Award: Pentti Rasinkangas & Ohilyönti - Lehmän mopo (Paul Warren)
- Honorable Mention: Russian Love - Will you come out to play? (Mika Ronkainen, Panu Tyhtilä)
- Honorable Mention: Wilma - Claudius (Hande Andersson)
- Honorable Mention: Invisible Dolls sound parade - Työtäni teen/Voitko luopua nyt (Anneli Nygren)
- Honorable Mention: Janita - Mikään ei oo mahdotonta (Riitta Sourander)
- Honorable Mention: Circle - Crawatt (Jorma Mehtonen)
- Honorable Mention: Mahtavat lämpöpussit - Jeesus käski mut parturiin (Vesa Kataisto, Pekka Heiman)
- Honorable Mention: Saukki ja Pikkuoravat - Villin lännen villitys (Rauni Järvilehto)
