= Air guitar (disambiguation) =

Air guitar is mimed guitar play.

Air Guitar may also refer to:

- "Air Guitar" (McBusted song)
- "Air Guitar", single by Ben & Jason
- "Air Guitar", single by Towers of London from Blood, Sweat and Towers
- Guitar Rockstar, European brand name for a virtual air guitar marketed in Japan under the brand name "Air Guitar"
- "Air Guitar", episode of Balamory

== See also ==
- Air Guitar Nation 2006 documentary about the first US Air Guitar Championships
- Air Guitar in Oulu
