= Lodger =

Lodger may refer to:

- Lodger, a person whose accommodation takes the form of lodging
- Lodger, in British English a person who rents a room or secondary suite in a private residence
- Lodger (album), a 1979 art rock album by David Bowie
- Lodger (British band), a short-lived supergroup comprising members of Powder, Supergrass, and Delicatessen
- Lodger (Finnish band), a Finnish indie rock band
- "Lodgers" (Green Wing), a 2004 television episode

== See also ==
- The Lodger (disambiguation)
