= Närhi =

Närhi is a Finnish surname. Notable people with the surname include:

- Matti Närhi (born 1975), Finnish javelin thrower
- Laura Närhi (born 1978), Finnish pop singer
