= Air guitar =

Form of dance and movement

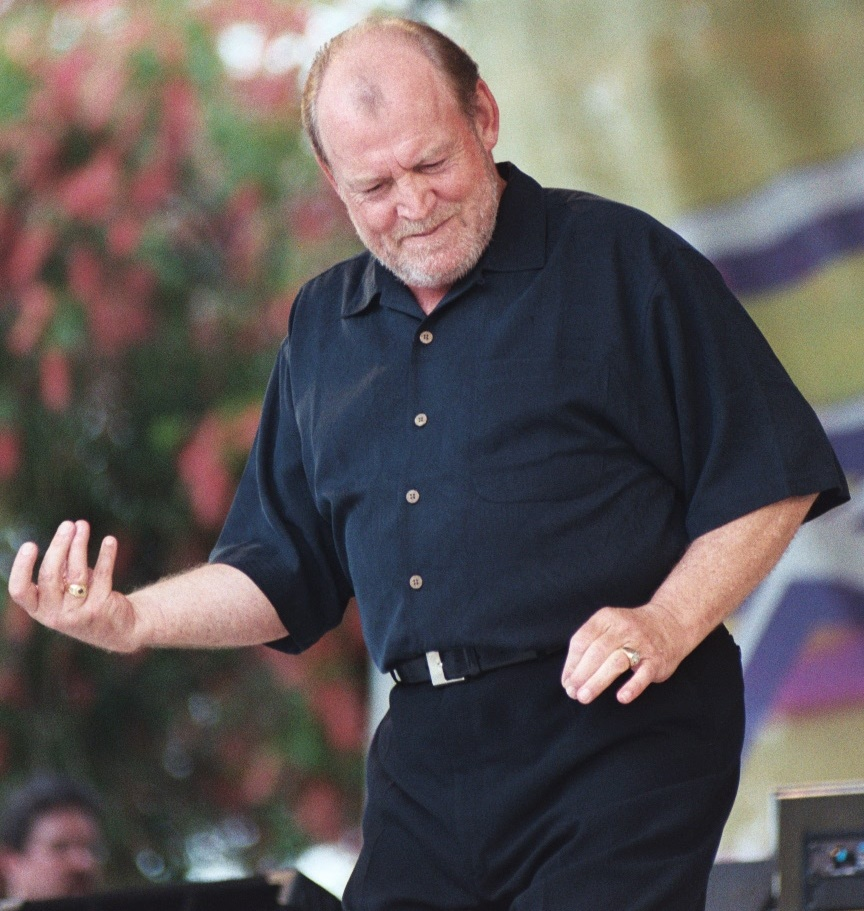
Joe Cocker's signature movements helped lead to air guitar.

Air guitar is a form of movement in which the performer pretends to play an imaginary rock or heavy metal-style electric guitar, including riffs and solos. Playing an air guitar usually consists of exaggerated strumming and picking motions, and is often coupled with loud singing or lip-synching. Air guitar is generally used in the imaginary simulation of loud electric or acoustic guitar music.

== History ==
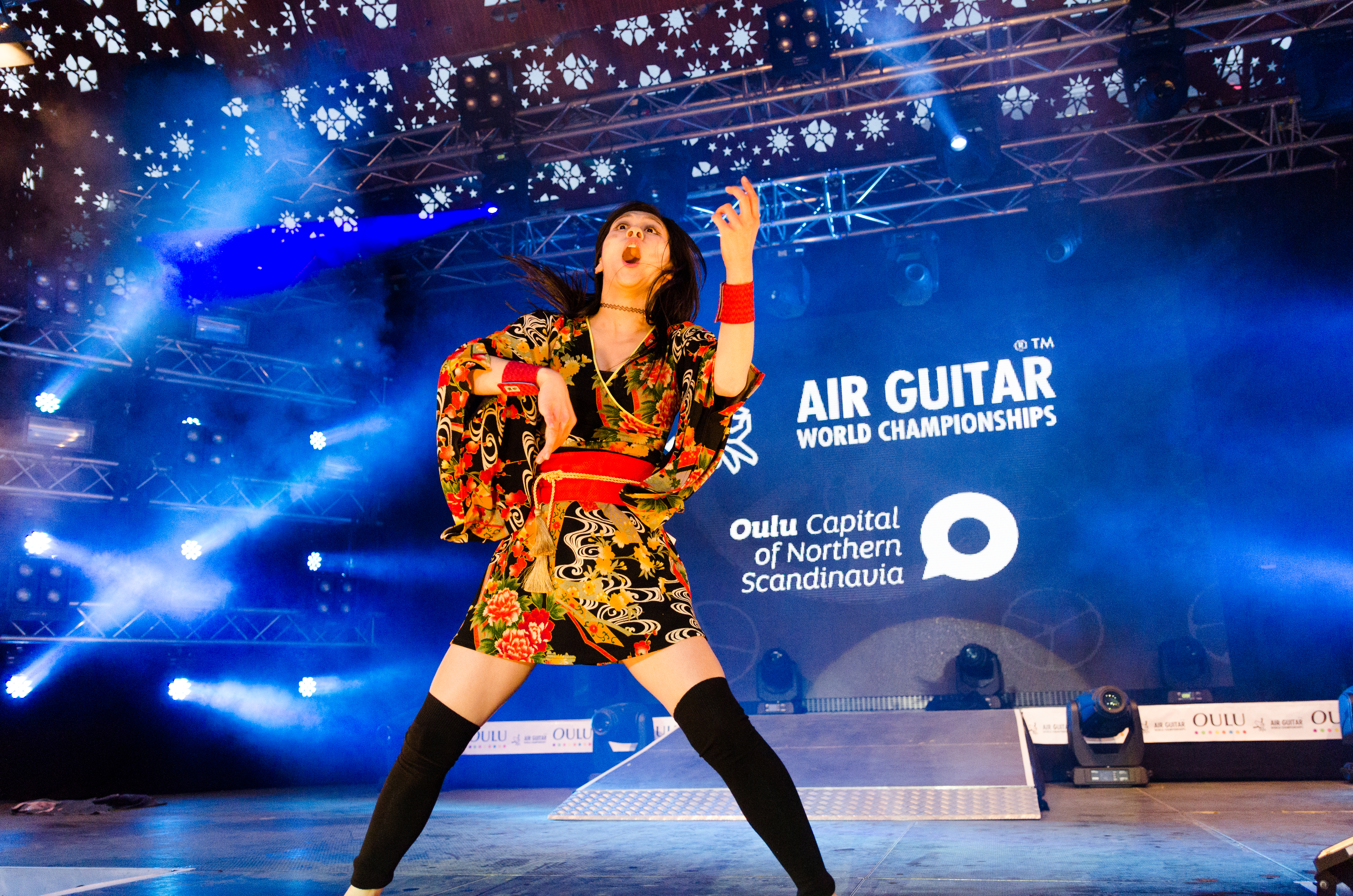
Nanami "Seven Seas" Nagura, Air Guitar World Champion 2014 in Oulu, Finland

Before the existence of air guitar, the popularity of the phonograph in the 1930s led to the phenomenon of "shadow conducting", in which listeners would pretend to conduct an orchestra.

Air guitar had a seminal moment at the Woodstock music festival in 1969, when singer Joe Cocker mimicked the playing of the keyboard and guitar during his performance of "With a Little Help From My Friends". Cocker's elaborate signature moves helped introduce the concept of air guitar to the public.

Neal Kay, founder of the Soundhouse heavy metal club in Kingsbury, London, recalls one night in 1976 a club regular named Rob "Loonhouse" Yeatman arrived at the club carrying a piece of hardboard cut into the shape of a Flying V guitar, with no frets or strings. "Suddenly Rob appears in front of everyone and he starts playing it along with the solo and he's absolutely perfect."

One of the first air guitar contests was held at Florida State University in 1978. The term "air guitar" subsequently gained popularity in the 1980s as more contests were held in Sweden and the United States. Since 1996, the annual Air Guitar World Championships have been organized in Oulu, Finland. The first competitions were arranged as part of Oulu Music Video Festival. Since 2011, it has been produced by Airnest Productions Ltd, which also administers the official Air Guitar World Championships Network of licensed national championships. The idea of the contest originated as a joke that was intended to be a side attraction for the music video festival but has since become a major draw in its own right.

== Contests ==
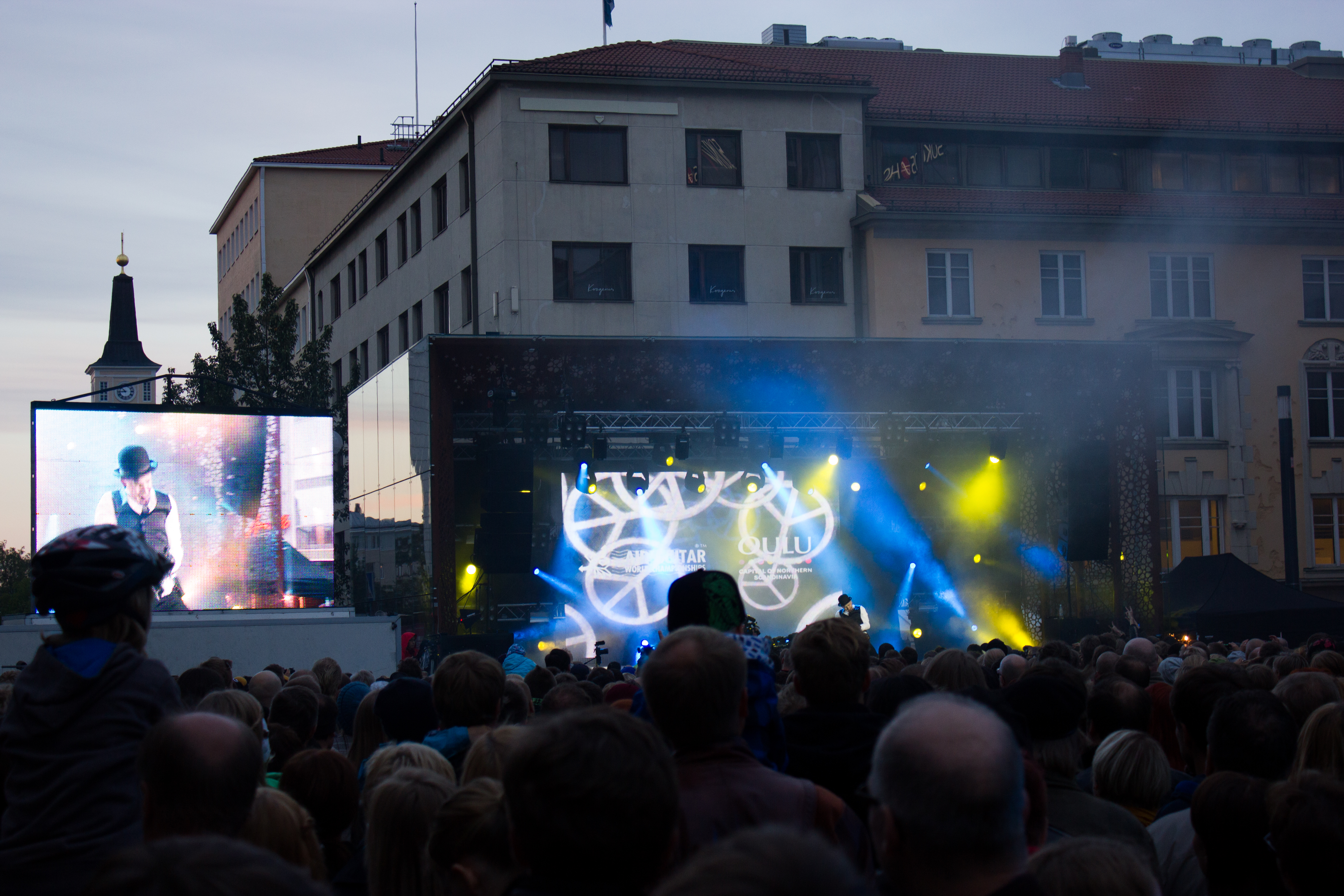
Air Guitar Championship 2012 in Oulu

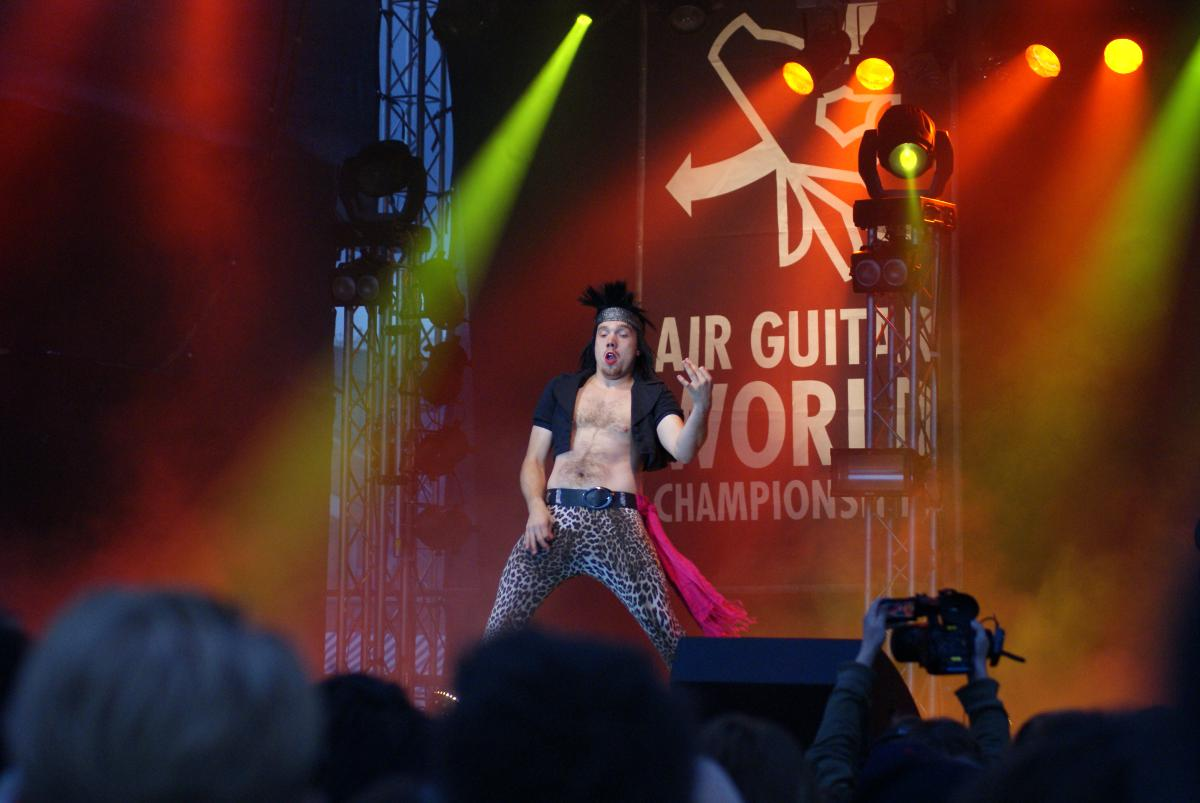
Kevin "Narvalwaker" Leloux at the 2010 Air Guitar World Championships in Oulu, Finland

Air guitar contests have much in common with the figure skating scoring system, especially using 6.0 score system. The most common set of rules are as following:

- Each participant has to play air guitar on stage in two rounds, each lasting for one minute.
  - Round 1: participant plays a selection of his or her choice. Typically the song has been edited (or a medley has been created) to fit the 60-second format.
  - Round 2: participant plays a section of the song chosen by an organizer or competitor; usually the song is not announced beforehand and kept secret until the round begins so the participant has to improvise.
- Participant plays alone; backing bands, either with real or air instruments are not allowed; roadies and groupies are allowed to make up some image but they must leave the stage before performance.
- Participant has to play air guitar (i.e. air drums, piano and other instruments are not allowed). Air guitar can be acoustic, electric or both.
- Generally, there is no dress code and participant is encouraged to use any clothing and props that would add character and make the performance more interesting. Any real musical equipment or crew (instruments, amplifiers, effect pedals, and backing band members) are strictly forbidden. Some events make an exception for a real guitar pick.
- Jury consists of independent judges, usually B-list musicians, music critics, comedians, or other members of the media.
- Judges use the same 6.0 score system as in the traditional figure skating system: there are several varying criteria, and each judge must give the contestant a score from 4.0 to 6.0 on each of the following:
  - Technical merit—how much the performance looks like the real playing, including accurate reproduction of all fretwork, chords, solos and technical moves.
  - Stage presence—a charisma of rock star, the ability to rock, lack of stage fright and power to drive thousands of listeners; involves guitar showmanship and other emotional demonstrations.
  - Airness—the most subjective criterion, as "presentation" in figure skating—how much the performance was an object of art by itself, not only a simulation of playing guitar.

=== World ===
Annual world championships

Annual Air Guitar World Championships were first held in 1996 as part of the Oulu Music Video Festival in Oulu, Finland, and now held there each August. According to the competition ideology, "wars will end, climate change will stop and all bad things will vanish when all the people in the world play the air guitar".

Participants from all over the world compete in skills of playing air guitar. The judges represent professionals of performing arts and culture, the guitarist Juha Torvinen among others. The winner gets a custom-made guitar, 'Flying Finn', by Matti and Saara Nevalainen. One year, Brian May, the lead guitarist of Queen, donated a VOX BM Special amplifier for the winner.

Due to the COVID-19 Pandemic, the Air Guitar World Championships were not held in 2020 and 2021. In lieu of a 2021 championship, the Air Guitar World Championships organized a virtual Champion of Champions Championships on August 27, 2021, won by Justin "Nordic Thunder" Howard.

=== United States ===
In 2003, Cedric Devitt and Kriston Rucker founded US Air Guitar, the official governing body of air guitar in the US.

The 2004 US Air Guitar Championships featured regional competitions in five cities. MiRi "Sonyk-Rok" Park, winner of the New York City regional, took the national crown by defeating Fatima "The Rockness Monster" Hoang from Los Angeles. She went to Finland, where she tied for first place, becoming the 2004 World Air Guitar Co-Champion.

By 2008, US Air Guitar had expanded to include regional competitions in 24 cities. The 2006 US Air Guitar Champion, Craig "Hot Lixx Hulahan" Billmeier, went on to defeat 2005 Champion Fatima "The Rockness Monster" Hoang and 2007 Champion Andrew "William Ocean" Litz en route to his second national title. In Finland, Hulahan won, securing the United States' third world title and becoming the 2008 World Air Guitar Champion.

William Ocean won his second national title in 2009, earning him a spot in Finland at the 2009 World Air Guitar Championships. Ocean and defending World Air Guitar Champion Hulahan tied for second place, behind Sylvain "Gunther Love" Quimene of France.

In 2020 and 2021, US Air Guitar moved to online competitions, due to the COVID-19 pandemic. The 2021 US Air Guitar season ended with a live, in-person finals in Chicago, Illinois.

==== List of United States Championships ====
List of United States Championships

Year	Gold	Silver	Bronze
2024	Cole "Slappy Nutz" Lindbergh, Kansas City, MO	Erich "Erik Ittar" Hacker, Seattle, WA	Rob "The Marquis" Messel, Portland, OR
2023	Matt "Airistotle" Burns, New York City		
2022	Rachel "Hott Mess" Sinclair, Denver, CA	Beth "CindAIRella" Melin, Kansas City, MO	Luke "Van Dammage" Sevcik, Atlanta, GA
2021	Andrew "Flying Finn" Finn, West Des Moines, IA	Rob "Skinemax" Weychert, Philadelphia, PA	Jason "Randy Diablo" Farnan, San Diego
2020	Justin "Smiley Rod" Magaldi, Nashville, TN		
2019	Rob "The Marquis" Messel, Portland, OR	Kate "KitKat" Rose, Sacramento, CA	Matt "Airistotle" Burns, New York City
2018	Brittany "Georgia Lunch" Diaz, New York City	Rob "Windhammer" Weychert, New York City	Colin "Old Glory" Bach, Chicago
2017	Nicole "Mom Jeans Jeanie" Sevcik, Atlanta	Beth "CindAIRella" Melin, Kansas City, KS / Alexander "The Jinja Assassin" Roberts, Chicago	
2016	Matt "Airistotle" Burns, New York City	Nicole "Mom Jeans Jeanie" Sevcik, Atlanta	Rob "The Marquis" Messel, Portland
2015	Matt "Airistotle" Burns, New York City	Lance "The Shred" Kasten, Washington, DC	Andrew "Flying Finn" Finn, Des Moines / Jeff "The Airtiste" Stiles, Boston / Whit "Witness" Hubner, Nashville
2014	Matt "Airistotle" Burns, New York City	Doug "The Thunder" Stroock, Washington, DC	Jason "Lt. Facemelter" Farnan, San Diego
2013	Jason "Lt. Facemelter" Farnan, San Diego	Eric "Mean" Melin, Lawrence	Matt "Airistotle" Burns, New York City
2012	Matt "Airistotle" Burns, New York City	Justin "Nordic Thunder" Howard, 2011 defending champion	Jason "Lt. Facemelter" Farnan, San Diego
2011	Justin "Nordic Thunder" Howard, Chicago	Matt "Airistotle" Burns, New York City	Matt "Romeo Dance Cheetah" Cornelison, 2010 defending champion
2010	Matt "Romeo Dance Cheetah" Cornelison, Milwaukee	Ryan "Dreamcatcher" Layman, Denver	Andrew "William Ocean" Litz, 2009 defending champion
2009	Andrew "William Ocean" Litz, New York City	Chris "Sanjar the Destroyer" Paxton, Washington DC	Cami "Airosol" Phillippi, Minneapolis
2008	Craig "Hot Lixx Hulahan" Billmeier, Washington DC	Cami "Airosol" Phillippi, Minneapolis	Alex "Awesome" Koll, San Francisco
2007	Andrew "William Ocean" Litz, New York City	Fatima "Rockness Monster" Hoang, Los Angeles	Craig "Hot Lixx Hulahan" Billmeier, 2006 defending champion / Randall "Big Rig" Layman, Houston
2006	Craig "Hot Lixx Hulahan" Billmeier		
2005	Fatima "Rockness Monster" Hoang, Los Angeles	Dan "Bjorn Turoque" Crane, New York City	Andrew "William Ocean" Litz, Chicago
2004	MiRi "Sonyk-Rok" Park	Fatima "Rockness Monster" Hoang, Los Angeles	
2003	David "C-Diddy" Jung, New York City	Gordon "Krye Tuff" Hintz, Los Angeles	

=== United Kingdom ===
The Air Guitar UK Championship was created in 2006 by twice air guitar world champion Zac 'the Magnet' Monroe (the first non-Finn to win the competition) and is affiliated with the Air Guitar World Championships in Oulu, Finland, forming part of the World Air Guitar Network.

In September 2011, Air Guitar UK launched Air Guitar Wales and Air Guitar Northern Ireland to join Air Guitar Scotland (first launched by AGUK in 2009) as part of the Air Guitar UK Network.

Air Guitar UK events are held in support of the Teenage Cancer Trust.

==== UKAG ====
UK Air Guitar (UKAG) works regularly with charities including RAFA, The 1800 Club and Action Medical Research.

==== German Air Guitar ====
In 2004 the German Air Guitar Federation was co-founded by Friedericke van Meer and took place in Berlin. https://www.welt.de/print-wams/article129918/Voellig-aus-der-Luft-gegriffen.html In 2013 German Air Guitar Championship was co-founded by Hans Haberkorn in Koblenz where also the nationals were being held. Since 2017 the german air guitar championships are presented by the Backstage Concerts GmbH in Munich within the Free & Easy Festival. https://backstage.eu/free-easy-2025/free-easy-festival.html Due to the Pandemic no german nationals were held in the years 2020 - 2022

==== List of German Championships ====
List of German Championships

Year	Gold	Silver	Bronze
2025	Patrick "Van Airhoven" Culek	Sandra "Toastair Woman" Berger	Martin "Shorty The Scarecrow" Rüthschilling
2024	Patrick "Ehrwolf" Culek	David "Onkel Udo" Monreal	Marc "Airbreaker" Dumont
2023	Martin "Shorty The Priest" Rüthschilling	Marc "Airbreaker" Dumont	Heiko "Itchenson" Crezelius
2019	Patrick "Ehrwolf" Culek	Martin "Shorty Be Real" Rüthschilling	Marc "Airbreaker" Dumont
2018	Patrick "Ehrwolf" Culek	Daniel "Moredrive" Oldemeier	Marie "Chuck Airy" von Borstel
2017	Patrick "Ehrwolf" Culek	David "Onkel Udo" Monreal	Marc "Airbreaker" Dumont
2016	David "Onkel Udo" Monreal	Patrick "Ehrwolf" Culek	Daniel "Moredrive" Oldemeier
2015	Sabrina "Lady Liberty" Schramm	Marc "Airbreaker" Dumont	Martin "Shorty El Tiburon" Rüthschilling
2014	Sabrina "Lady Liberty" Schramm	Daniel "Moredrive" Oldemeier	Marie "Chuck Airy" von Borstel
2013	Daniel "Moredrive" Oldemeier	Marie "Chuck Airy" von Borstel	Sabrina "Lady Liberty" Schramm
2012	Christian "Heart Buckboard"Sweep	Marie "Moldy Peach" von Borstel	Stefan Mr. 10.000 Volt" Voltz
2011	Aline "The Devil's Niece" Westphal	Stefan "Mr. 10.000 Voltz" Voltz	Christian "Heart Buckboard" Sweep
2010	Christian “Heart Buckboard" Sweep	Aline "The Devil’s Niece" Westphal	Jan "Igor der Karpate" Fischer
2009	Christian "Heart Buckboard" Sweep	Melanie "Mel From Hell" Marker	Jan "Geeky Gisbert" Fischer
2008	Christian "Heart Buckboard" Sweep	Paul "Doktor Schemelsky" Schlagk	Jochen "Capri Boy" Sippel
2007	René "Schmidde" Schmidt	Paul "Doktor Schemelsky" Schlagk	Kevin "Tormentor" Kurth
2006	Christian "Heart Buckboard" Sweep	Stefan "Mr. 10.000 Voltz" Voltz	Michael "The Grinder" Lihl
2005	Katharina "Leni Krawitzkowsky" Tomaschek	Tobias "Terror T" Riedl	Ingo "Ingroove" Schulz
2004	Ingo "Ingroove" Schulz	Christian "Heart Buckboard" Sweep	Henning "Count Bathory" Krämer

=== Belgium Air Guitar ===
The Belgian Championship has been held in Belgium since 2009. The championship consists of several qualifying rounds, culminating in a final in June/July. In each preliminary round, one contestant is selected to advance to the final. The winner receives a guitar and gets to represent the country at the world championship.

In the early years, the championship final took place during the prestigious Dour Festival.

As guests on “Sans Chichi” on La Une, “Tout le Monde Veut Prendre sa Place” on France 2, and “Belgium’s Got Talent,” the Belgian Air Guitarists met celebrities such as Airbourne, Channel Zero, Toots Thielemans, Malin Åkerman, Stromae, Jean-Luc Fonck, Michaël Gregorio, Dropkick Murphys, and many others at events where they showcased skills, such as Graspop, the Inc’rock Festival, Metallica at the Stade de France, and La Nuit des Publivores.

However, the most significant event in the history of the Belgian championship undoubtedly took place in 2011 at the Groezrock Festival, when the Belgian Air Guitar Federation broke the world record for the largest number of people playing air guitar simultaneously: a record of 5,000, verified in the presence of a professional.

In 2023, the Belgian championship returned after a long hiatus, led by the first two champions in history: “Airgus” and “Narvalwaker.” It was a successful comeback, featuring just one qualifying round and one final with a new partner: STAGG, which presented the champion with an electric guitar.

From 2023 through 2026, the Belgian federation continued to grow, with nine qualifying competitions held across the country and a grand finale at the ZIK ZAK in Ittre.

In 2026, during an official ceremony, the Belgian Air Guitar Federation presented Manneken Pis with a costume in honor of the championship’s history.

==== List of Belgian Champions ====
- 2009 : Corentin Fermont "Airgus" (Brussel)
- 2010 : Corentin Fermont "Airgus" (Brussel)
- 2011 : Kevin Leloux "Narvalwaker" (Beyne Heusay)
- 2012 : Bryan Antoine "Telerockbies" (Elsene)
- 2013: Emmanuelle ”Miss Issipy” Stempniakowski
- 2015: Bryan Antoine "Dirty Beaujolais" (Elsene)
- 2023: Bryan Antoine "Dirty Beaujolais" (Elsene)
- 2024: Bryan Antoine "Dirty Beaujolais" (Elsene)
- 2025: Léon "Leonfire " Ortrowsky (Brussel)
- 2026: Léonard "Lenny Rocket" Pollet (Brussels)

Belgium's ranking at the World Championship

- 2003: 3rd place: Kris Achten "Stan Kreich"
- 2004: 12th place: Ron Van den Branden "Bucketbutt"
- 2009: 17th place: Corentin Fermont "Airgus
- 2010: 4th place: Corentin Fermont "Airgus" and 6th place: Kevin Leloux "Narvalwaker"
- 2011: 9th place: Kevin Leloux "Narvalwaker" and 14th place: Corentin Fermont "Airgus"
- 2012: 7th place: Corentin Fermont "Airgus", 12th place: Raphaël Monnanteuil "Willy Wantmore" and 12th place: Bryan Antoine "Telerockbies"
- 2013: 6th place: Emmanuelle ”Miss Issipy” Stempniakowski and 10th place: Corentin Fermont "Airgus"
- 2014: 9th place: Corentin ”AirGus” Fermont
- 2015: 12th place: Emmanuelle ”Miss Issipy” Stempniakowski
- 2023: 4th place Corentin Fermont "Airgus" (Brussel) and 7th place Bryan Antoine "Dirty Beaujolais".
- 2024: 7 th place Bryan Antoine "Dirty Beaujolais" .
- 2025: 7th place Léon "Leonfire " Ortrowsky and voted Fan Favorite.
- 2026: 11th Léonard "Lenny Rocket" Pollet and voted Fan Favorite.

== Innovations ==
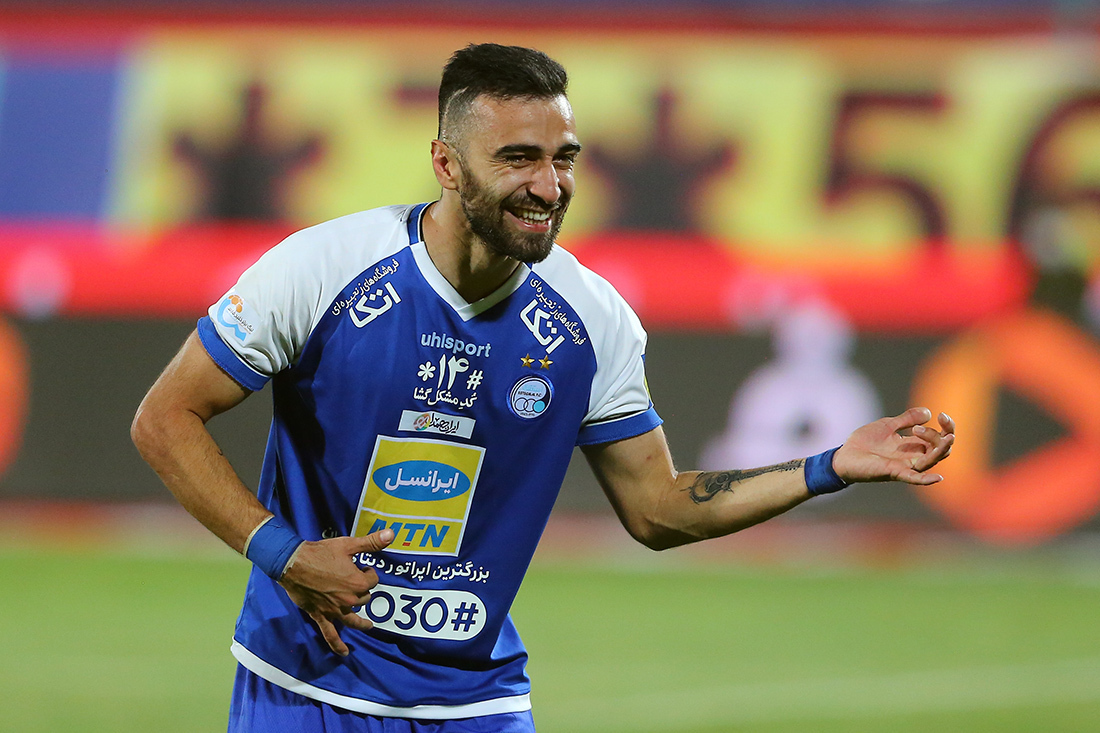
A football player playing air guitar as a goal celebration

Multiple technological innovations allow air guitar to be played as a real instrument, producing sounds that depend on the air guitarist's actions. In 2005, students from the Helsinki University of Technology developed a system that translates hand movements into electric guitar sounds, resulting in a functional air guitar. The system, consisting of a pair of brightly coloured gloves and an infrared camera, is one of the most popular exhibits at the Helsinki Science Center. The camera recognizes the distance between the two gloves and the strumming movements made by the wearer to synthesize an electric guitar tune, working using only six notes.

In November 2006, researchers at the Australian government's Commonwealth Scientific and Industrial Research Organisation (CSIRO) announced they had developed a tee-shirt that senses human movement to "showcase its expertise in designing and manufacturing electronic and intelligent textiles with which people effortlessly control computers", publicising it as an air guitar shirt.

In 2007, toy company Silverlit introduced V-Beat Air Guitar, a device that consists of a motion-sensing guitar pick, a neck part with four buttons and a guitar body. By changing the distance between body and neck, and pressing a combination of the four buttons on the neck part, up to 48 tones and chords can be played. The V-Beat Air Guitar was won 'Best Music Gadget' on the television program The Gadget Show.

In 2007, a Japanese toy company Takara Tomy introduced Air Guitar Pro (Guitar Rockstar), a functional guitar simulator. Fitting in one hand, the device uses heat and motion sensors to detect the other hand motions and produce guitar sounds.

In March 2008, Jada Toys of California introduced the Air Guitar Rocker toy that included patented technology in a belt buckle. When the user strums a magnetic pick in front of the belt buckle, guitar music plays through a portable amplifier attached to the users pants or belt. The Air Guitar Rocker is marketed with the popular Guitar Hero license and was created by toy inventor David Führer and his team.

== See also ==
- Air Guitar Nation, a documentary film about the 2003 US and World Air Guitar competitions
- Air Guitar in Oulu, a documentary film following a young air guitarist's mission to attend the World Championship in Oulu
- Catching Air, a documentary film about an inspiring story of an air guitar community
