= Oulu International Children's and Youth Film Festival =

Film festival in Oulu, Finland

- Location: Oulu, Finland
- Founded: 1982
- Awards: Starboy Award, ECFA Award, Prixe of the Media Foundation of the Evangelical Lutheran Church of Finland, For Tomorrow Award
- No. of films: 80
- Website: www.oulunelokuvakeskus.fi/lef/etusivu

Oulu International Children's and Youth Film Festival (Finnish: Oulun kansainvälinen lasten- ja nuortenelokuvien festivaali) is an annual children's film festival held in November in Oulu, Finland. The festival has been founded in 1982 by the Oulu Film Centre.

A children's film competition has been part of the festival since 1992. The jury of ten children chooses the best film and the Starboy Award is granted to the director of the film. Other awards are the ECFA Award for the best European film, the For Tomorrow Award to the best youth film and a prize of the Media Foundation of the Evangelical Lutheran Church of Finland for a Finnish feature or short film at the film festival. The main venue for the festival is the Cultural Centre Valve in the city centre; films are also shown in the Finnkino cinema.
