= Long Lost Friend (disambiguation) =

Long Lost Friend is a 1820 book by Johann Georg Hohman.

Long Lost Friend may also refer to:

- "Long Lost Friend" (song), a 1991 song by Restless Heart
- The Long Lost Friend, a 2013 album by Husky Rescue
- The Long Lost Friend, the working title of the 1988 film Apprentice to Murder
