= Ship of Light =

Studio album by Husky Rescue
- Released: January 2010
- Genres: Ambient, folktronica
- Label: Catskills Records

Professional ratings
Review scores
Source	Rating
The Digital Fix	(7/10)
The Fly	4/5 stars
Music OMH	4/5 stars
London Tourdates	4/5 stars
The Guardian	4/5 stars
Sunday Times	4/5 stars
Altsounds	(81/100)

Ship of Light is the third album by the Finnish ambient pop band Husky Rescue. It was first released by Catskills Records in January 2010. A special edition of the album was released in April 2011 with a box set designed by Kustaa Saksi including five new bonus tracks and a DVD of live footage and music videos. Three songs were mixed in Sweden with Niklas Flyckt, whose previous work include Britney Spears’ song Toxic. The music video for the single They are Coming directed by Pete Riski won a Muuvi Award in 2009 by IFPI Finland, and director Antony Bentley received an honorary mention for the music video of Fast Lane at Oulu Music Video Festival in 2011.

== Inspiration and recording ==
The title of the album refers to a UFO sighting Marko Nyberg witnessed near his home one night, but also the feeling of transference and escapism. The music was inspired by nature and recorded partly in a forest at Lake Bodom, an unsolved murder site in the early sixties in Finland. The band wandered in the fields in the night and during the day recorded the tracks with Reeta-Leena singing lying down on an old iron bed in a cottage of a hippie friend of theirs. Featuring Jari Salo, one half of the duo Pepe Deluxé and a long-time friend of Marko's, the album was met with positive reviews in the media, such as The Guardian giving it four out of five stars and comparing the sound to "the kind of adult pop that Air were promising us with their first album", or The Sunday Times naming the album CD of the week and rating it four stars.

== Track listing ==
1. "First Call" – 0:57
2. "Sound of Love" – 4:14
3. "Fast Lane" – 4:43
4. "Wolf Trap Motel" – 6:03
5. "Man of Stone" – 5:04
6. "When Time Was On Their Side" – 3:58
7. "Grey Pastures, Still Waters" – 3:47
8. "We Shall Burn Bright" – 5:03
9. "They Are Coming" – 4:38
10. "Beautiful My Monster" – 4:18

=== Special Edition ===
1. "First Call"
2. "Sound of Love"
3. "Fast Lane"
4. "Wolf Trap Motel"
5. "Man of Stone"
6. "When Time Was On Their Side"
7. "Grey Pastures, Still Waters"
8. "We Shall Burn Bright"
9. "They Are Coming"
10. "Beautiful My Monster"
11. "Hurricane (Don’t Come Knocking) – Lake Bodom Recordings"
12. "City Lights – Lake Bodom Recordings"
13. "Sound of Love– Lake Bodom Recordings"
14. "Man of Stone – Lake Bodom Recordings"
15. "Snowfall"
16. "First Call (Instrumental)"
17. "Sound of Love (Instrumental)"
18. "Fast Lane (Instrumental)"
19. "Wolf Trap Motel (Instrumental)"
20. "Man of Stone (Instrumental)"
21. "When Time Was On Their Side (Instrumental)"
22. "Grey Pastures, Still Waters (Instrumental)"
23. "We Shall Burn Bright (Instrumental)"
24. "They Are Coming (Instrumental)"
25. "Beautiful My Monster (Instrumental)"
26. "City Lights – (Live in Hotel Arthur)"
27. "When Time Was On Their Side (Live in Hotel Arthur)"
28. "We Shall Burn Bright (Live in Hotel Arthur)"
29. "Beautiful My Monster (Live in Hotel Arthur)"
30. "Sound of Love (Live at the Wilmington Arms)"
31. "Fast Lane [Music Video]"
32. "They Are Coming [Music Video]"
33. "Sound of Love [Music Video]"

== Singles ==
- "They Are Coming" (2010)
- "Sound Of Love" (2010)
- "We Shall Burn Bright" (2010)
- "Fast Lane" (2011)
