= The Long Lost Friend =

Studio album by Husky Rescue
- Released: June 2013
- Genre: Ambient
- Label: El Camino Records

Husky Rescue chronology
Ship of Light (2010)	The Long Lost Friend (2013)

Professional ratings
Review scores
Source	Rating
Loud and Quiet	7/10 stars
Contactmusic.com	7/10 stars

The Long Lost Friend is the fourth album by the Finnish ambient pop band Husky Rescue. It was released on El Camino Records in June 2013 and re-released with a second disc and download codes of bonus instrumental recordings and videos on Catskills Records in April 2015. This is their first album featuring Swedish vocalist Johanna Kalén and Antony Bentley, following the reconstituting of the band prompted by Reeta-Leena Vestman's (née Korhola) departure.

== Track listing ==
All tracks by Husky Rescue

1. "Restless Feet"
2. "Under Friendly Fire"
3. "River"
4. "Colors"
5. "June"
6. "Mountains Only Know"
7. "The Long Lost Friend"
8. "Tree House"

=== Re-release bonus tracks ===
1. "Min Lilla Eld"
2. "Deep Forest Green"
3. "Wind In The Willows"
4. "Sunrider"
5. "Skin of Snow"
6. "Pistachio Tree"
7. "Sunrise In The Mist"
8. "Robot Requiem"
9. "Werewolf & Fools"
10. "Wind In The Willows II"
11. "Jigsaw Puzzle"
12. "Far From The Storm"
13. "Onnellisuus"
14. "Tree House - Clouds Remix"
15. "Deep Forest Green - Clouds Interpretation"
16. "Fast Lane - ID Session Audio"
