= Country Falls =

Studio album by Husky Rescue
- Released: October 2004
- Recorded: 2004
- Genre: Ambient
- Label: Catskills records

Husky Rescue chronology
Country Falls (2004)	Ghost Is Not Real (2007)

Professional ratings
Review scores
Source	Rating
Allmusic	4/5 stars
Pixel Surgeon	(8/10)
Three Imaginary Girls	(9.1/10)
Tiny Mix Tapes	4/5 stars

Country Falls is the debut album by the Finnish ambient pop band Husky Rescue. It was released on Catskills Records in October 2004 and re-released with a DVD in April 2005. The music by Finnish multi-instrumentalist Marko Nyberg and his band is country-influenced folk-pop with organic instrumentation and sparse samples, and features the vocals of Reeta-Leena Vestman (née Korhola).

== Track listing ==
All tracks by Husky Rescue

1. "Sweet Little Kitten" – 4:45
2. "Summertime Cowboy" – 4:06
3. "New Light of Tomorrow" – 4:52
4. "Sunset Drive" – 3:59
5. "My World" – 4:50
6. "City Lights" – 4:25
7. "Gasoline Girl" – 4:13
8. "Rainbow Flows" – 5:52
9. "Sleep Tight Tiger" – 4:37
10. "Mean Street" – 6:45
11. "Good Man" – 7:52
12. "Man Who Flew Away" – 1:33

=== Re-release DVD Bonus ===
1. "New Light of Tomorrow [Music Video]"
2. "Summertime Cowboy [Music Video]"
3. "City Lights [Music Video]"

== Singles ==
- "Summertime Cowboy" (2004)
- "New Light Of Tomorrow" (2004)
- "Sleep Tight Tiger" (2004)
- "City Lights" (2004)

== Personnel ==
- Marko Nyberg – bass, music & Lyrics
- Reeta-Leena Korhola – vocals
- Anssi Sopanen – drums
- Abdissa "Mamba" Assefa – Bongos, Tambourine, Handclapping
- Blaise Barton – Mastering
- Miika Colliander – Guitar (Acoustic), Slide Guitar
- Jon Goodwillie – Executive Producer
- Janne Haavisto – Engineer
- Timo Kämäräinen – Guitar, Lap Steel Guitar
- Timo Lassy – Flute, Flute (Alto), Saxophone
- Jussi Lehtipuu – Strings
- Mikka Lommi – Video Director
- Teppo Mäkynen – Drums
- A. Mallassi – Executive Producer
- Khalid Mallassi – Executive Producer
- Marko Nyberg – Violin, Producer, Instrumentation
- Miikka Paatelainen – Guitar, Guitar (Electric), Lap Steel Guitar, Wah Wah Guitar
- Chris Parmenidis – Mastering
- Emma Pihkala – Strings
- Tommi Pylkko – Photography
- Ville Riippa – Organ, Guitar, Piano, Keyboards, Clavinet, Moog Synthesizer, Fender Rhodes
- Joonas Rippa – Drums
- Pete Riski – Video Director
- Lasse Sakara – Guitar (Acoustic)
- Kustaa Saki – Art Direction, Design
- Emma Salokoski – Vocals
- Sam Shingler – Guitar, Vocals
- Mikko Siren – Drums
- Rauna Sirola – Strings
- James Spectrum – Engineer
- Arttu Takalo – Vibraphone
- Heikki Tikka – Drums
