= Ghost Is Not Real =

Ghost is Not Real

Studio album by Husky Rescue
- Released: January 15, 2007
- Recorded: 2006/2007
- Genre: Ambient
- Label: Catskills Records

Husky Rescue chronology
Country Falls (2004)	Ghost is Not Real (2007)	Other World: Remixes and Rarities (2007)

Professional ratings
Review scores
Source	Rating
Allmusic	3.5/5 stars
Pitchfork Media	(6.9/10)

Ghost is Not Real is the second full-length album by Finnish ambient pop band Husky Rescue. It was released on Catskills Records on January 15, 2007. The Helsinki-based band, originally a one-man show orchestrated by Marko Nyberg, started with the intention of producing cinematic music inspired by the "power of films and hypnotic quality of photography." Even though the band has changed, now a four-sometimes-five member band with female lead singer, the original intentions are still there on the group's latest album Ghost Is Not Real, a collection of songs that, as the above quote suggests, makes for perfect company as we waltz through time and space into the dead of winter.

== Track listing ==
1. "My Home Ghost"
2. "Diamonds in the Sky"
3. "Nightless Night"
4. "Blueberry Tree Part I"
5. "Blueberry Tree Part II"
6. "Blueberry Tree Part III"
7. "Hurricane (Don't Come Knocking)"
8. "Silent Woods"
9. "Shadow Run"
10. "Caravan"

== Peaks ==
Country	Peak position
Finland	3

== Singles ==
- "My Home Ghost" (2006)
- "Diamonds In The Sky" (2006)
- "Nightless Night" (2007)
- "Caravan" (2007)

== Credits ==
- Marko Nyberg - bass, music & Lyrics
- Reeta-Leena Korhola - vocals
- Villee Riippa - keyboards
- Anssi Sopanen - drums
- Miika Colliander - guitar
