= Magyar Posse =

Finnish post-rock band

- Origin: Pori, Finland
- Genres: Post-rock, electronic music
- Years active: 1999–2012
- Labels: Verdura Records
- Members: Olli Joukio; Tuomas Laurila; Jari Lähteinen; Mikko Rintala; Pasi Salmi; Harri Sippola
- Past members: Sandra Mahlamäki
- Website: magyarposse.com

Magyar Posse was a Finnish post-rock band established in 2000 in the city of Pori. They have been praised by critics since their first album. Their second album achieved Top 40 status in Finland. They have toured frequently in Europe. Their first music video 'Whirlpool of Terror and Tension' (2006) won two awards in the Oulu Music Video Festival and a Kultainen Muuvi, the grand prize for Finnish music videos.

For their latest album, Random Avenger, the band got a sixth member, violinist Sandra Mahlamäki.

In 2008, the band completed an experimental film project titled Aldebaran rising with Pori-based director Petri Hagner. The film was performed on three occasions in Pori (October 17 and 18th, 2008) with live accompaniment by the band. There is no information of plans to perform the film elsewhere.

In June 2012, the band announced on their Facebook page that they had split up due to "lack of passion and motivation".

== Members ==
The current band members are: Olli Joukio, Tuomas Laurila, Jari Lähteinen, Mikko Rintala, Pasi Salmi, and Harri Sippola. Sandra Mahlamäki left the band in early 2010.

== Albums ==
- We Will Carry You Over the Mountains (Verdura Records 2002)
1. Sleepwalker
2. Witchcraft
3. Single Sparks Are Spectral Fires
4. Pacific Ocean/Death in the Desert
5. (Nameless)
6. Enemy Within
7. The Endless Cycle of Violence
8. Lufthan
- Kings of Time (Verdura Records 2004)
1. I
2. II
3. III
4. IV
5. V
6. VI
7. VII
- Random Avenger (Verdura Records 2006)
1. Whirlpool of Terror and Tension
2. Sudden Death
3. Black Procession
4. European Lover/Random Avenger
5. Intercontinental Hustle
6. One By One
7. Popzag

In addition the tracks "Sports" and "Combat Shock" in the album: Tulva-kokoelma 2: Tässä me uimme, tätä me juomme (2003) and "Robots 4 Life" from the album Huge Bass - Post It.

== See also ==
- List of post-rock bands
