= The Lodgers =

The Lodgers may refer to:

- The Lodgers (song), a song by the Style Council
- The Lodgers (1987 film), a Persian comedy film
- The Lodgers (2017 film), an Irish gothic horror film

== See also ==
- The Lodger (disambiguation)
