= The Lodger =

The Lodger may refer to:

- The Lodger (novel), a 1913 horror novel about a Jack the Ripper-like serial killer by Marie Adelaide Belloc Lowndes
  - The Lodger: A Story of the London Fog, a 1927 British silent film by Alfred Hitchcock
    - "The Lodger", a radio adaptation episode of Suspense
  - The Lodger (1932 film), a British thriller film
  - The Lodger (1944 film), an American horror film
  - The Lodger (opera), a 1960 opera by Phyllis Tate
  - The Lodger (2009 film), an American mystery/thriller film
- The Lodger (band), an indie pop band from Leeds, England
- "The Lodger" (Doctor Who), an episode of Doctor Who

== See also ==
- Lodger (disambiguation)
- The Lodgers (disambiguation)
