= Air Guitar Nation =

- Promotional film poster
- Directed by: Alexandra Lipsitz
- Produced by: Anna Barber; Dan Cutforth; Jane Lipsitz
- Starring: David S. Jung; Dan Crane; Zac Munro
- Edited by: Conor O'Neill
- Distributed by: Shadow Distribution
- Release date: 2006
- Running time: 81 minutes
- Country: United States
- Language: English

Air Guitar Nation is a feature-length 2006 documentary about the first US Air Guitar Championships, following the top contestants, David "C-Diddy" Jung and Dan "Björn Türoque" Crane, to the 2003 World Championship in Oulu, Finland.

The film premiered in 2006 as part of the AFI/Discovery Channel Documentary Film Festival and was then played at the 2007 Adelaide International Film Festival.

== See also ==
- Air Guitar in Oulu
