= Oulu Film Centre =

Cultural organization in Oulu, Finland

The Oulu Film Centre (Finnish: Oulun Elokuvakeskus R.Y., OEK) is a Finnish cultural organization, founded on 1973. Its mission is to advance knowledge of film culture, history and research. They have many means to do that. For example, they consult and advice, rent 16mm films and screen films in their film theatre called Studio. They have also library/archive which consists of press cuttings, posters, volumes and varying numbers of issues and volumes of periodicals. The film library and archives of the film centre are the second largest in Finland. The National Visual Archive is the biggest one. They also arrange seminars and other meetings.

Oulu Film Centre has organized the annual Oulu International Children's and Youth Film Festival since 1982.
