= Husky Rescue =

Finnish electronic music band

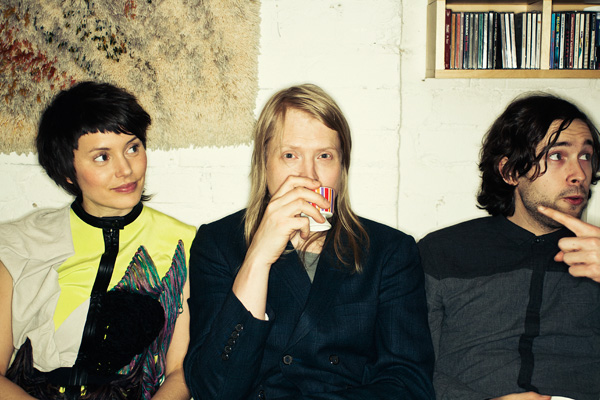
- Husky Rescue in 2011. From left to right: Johanna Kalén, Marko Nyberg, Antony Bentley

Background information
- Origin: Helsinki, Finland
- Genres: Electronic; folktronica; trip hop; ambient; downtempo
- Years active: 2002–present
- Labels: Catskills; Minty Fresh; El Camino
- Members: Marko Nyberg; Johanna Kalén; Antony Bentley
- Past members: Reeta-Leena Vestman; Ville Riippa; Anssi Sopanen; Miika Colliander
- Website: husky-rescue.com

Husky Rescue is a Finnish electronic music band from Helsinki, formed in 2002. The group consists of Marko Nyberg, Johanna Kalén, and Antony Bentley.

== History ==
=== 2002–2010 ===
Husky Rescue was formed by Marko Nyberg, who began composing under the name in 2002, wanting to create cinematic music influenced by film, photography and painting. He has counted film director David Lynch and French composer Erik Satie among his influences. When recording the band's debut album Country Falls, Nyberg recorded around twenty musicians and singers for use on the album—each of them a good friend of Nyberg's and all Helsinki-based. As Nyberg puts it himself:

"Every track is designed to be a warm breeze to counter the chill of daily life, whether you live in cold climes or not. All moments from life become part of the music. Husky Rescue reflects our background in Helsinki where the winter nights are so cold and long while the summer is hot and short, but oh so sweet. It's melancholic music but there is always hope. Husky Rescue's music is like the first snow on the ground when you can still see the green grass through the snow. It's like spring's sunbeam after the long, dark, sunless winter time."

Husky Rescue's line-up from 2002 to 2010 consisted of Nyberg (bass), Reeta-Leena Vestman (née Korhola, vocals), Ville Riippa (keyboards), Maria Ilmoniemi (keyboards), Anssi Sopanen (drums) and Miika Colliander (guitar). The band's debut album Country Falls was released worldwide in October 2004 on Catskills Records and in the US on 12 April 2005 on Minty Fresh.

The cinematic sceneries found on the debut were further developed on 2007's Ghost Is Not Real which turned up the sonic experimentation and detailed production without sacrificing the catchy, pop aesthetic. Nyberg's sense of dynamics and tendency towards delicacy on the album were described by Pitchfork Media as "an imagined collaboration, perhaps, between Ingmar Bergman and Jean-Pierre Jeunet".

Learning about a reported UFO sighting near his residence just outside central Helsinki further turned Nyberg's interest towards the nature, thus propelling a new wave of inspiration. He saw hope and beauty in the Northern surroundings, and embarked on a solitary songwriting trip to Lapland. Heavily featuring Jari Salo, one half of the duo Pepe Deluxé and a long-time friend of Marko's, Husky Rescue's third album Ship of Light was released in January 2010. The album was met with positive reviews in the media, such as The Guardian giving it four out of five stars and comparing the sound to "the kind of adult pop that Air were promising us with their first album", or The Sunday Times naming the album CD of the week and rating it four stars. Ben Hogwood of Music OMH remarked that the album continued in the tradition of their previous albums with "beautifully icy string colours" and "imaginative touches of orchestration."

Husky Rescue have performed at several music festivals such as Lollapalooza, Glastonbury, South by Southwest, and Austin City Limits. They have toured extensively in the UK and Europe, and played select shows in North America.

=== 2010–present ===
After touring their 2010 album Ship of Light, culminating in their last performance at Flow Festival in Helsinki in August 2011, the band reorganized and renewed. Prompted in part by long-standing singer Vestman taking the opportunity to study musical theatre at the Royal Academy of Music in London, Nyberg decided to strip everything down and start afresh, to head into a more intimate, bright and natural direction. Deciding on a new singer he met up with a Swedish vocalist Johanna Kalén in Stockholm and drafted in his old English friend, Antony Bentley, they formed the new line-up and started working on new material. Having written several new songs they decamped to Greenpoint, the Brooklyn studio of an enthusiastic vintage keyboard collector, to record them. Now finished they will be released in 2012. The first single of the new material, "Deep Forest Green", was released on 27 January 2012 and made available as a free download on the band's SoundCloud profile.

== Style and use in other media ==
The band's unique sound reconstitutes influences of alternative country, depressive disco, and pop into distinctive, cinematic soundscapes. From the beginning, digital illustrator Kustaa Saksi has crafted the visual side of the project, capturing the mood with his detailed yet minimalist style, reminiscent of the ukiyo-e paintings and masking-based comic style of Japan.

Due to the visual character and ability to convey emotion and mood, Husky Rescue's music has been placed in several advertisements and TV shows. "My World" was used in Hyundai's Think About It advertisements. "New Light of Tomorrow" was used in a P&O TV commercial and on the HBO TV series The Sopranos. "New Light of Tomorrow" and "The Good Man" were both used on the second season of One Tree Hill, while "Rainbow Flows" was featured in Beck's Italian beer commercial.

Nyberg scored two Finnish motion pictures; Sixpack (Pussikaljaelokuva) in 2011 and Twisted Roots (Väärät Juuret) in 2009, of which a soundtrack album was also released.

== Discography ==
=== Albums ===
- Country Falls (2004)
- Ghost Is Not Real (2007)
- Other World: Remixes and Rarities (2007)
- Ship of Light (2010)
- The Long Lost Friend (2013)

=== Singles ===
- "Summertime Cowboy" (2004)
- "New Light of Tomorrow" (2004)
- "Sleep Tight Tiger" (2004)
- "City Lights" (2004)
- "My Home Ghost" (2006)
- "Diamonds in the Sky" (2006)
- "Nightless Night" (2007)
- "Caravan" (2007)
- "We Shall Burn Bright" (2009)
- "Sound of Love" (2010)
- "They Are Coming" (2010)
- "Far from the Storm" (2010)
- "Fast Lane" (2011)
- "Deep Forest Green" (2012)
