= Kemopetrol =

Finnish band

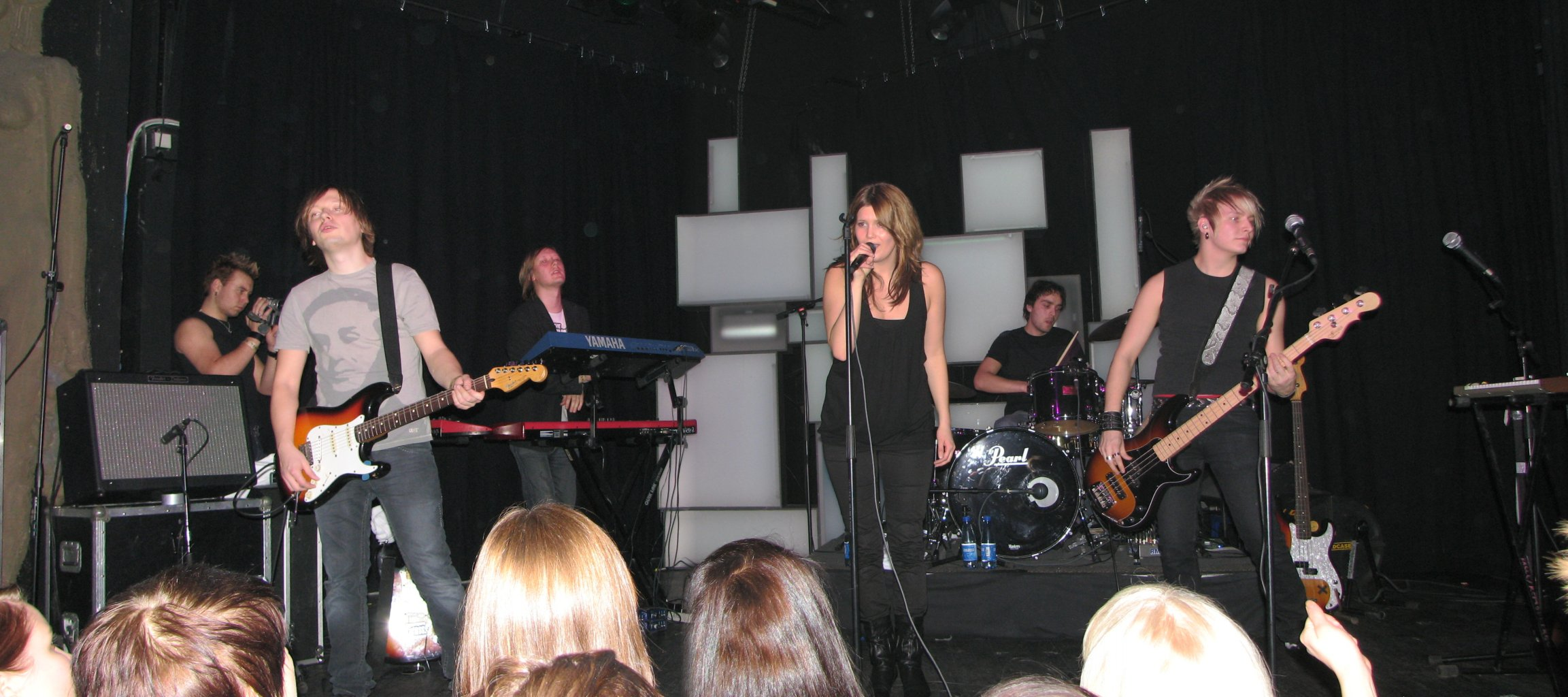
- Kemopetrol on stage.

Background information
- Origin: Helsinki, Finland
- Genres: pop, rock, electronic
- Years active: 1998 – present
- Labels: Warner Music Finland, BMG Finland, Plastinka
- Members: Laura Närhi; Kalle Koivisto; Marko Soukka; Teemu Nordman
- Past members: Kari Myöhänen; Lauri Hämäläinen
- Website: Official site

Kemopetrol is a Finnish band from Helsinki. The members of Kemopetrol are the vocalist Laura Närhi, the drummer Teemu Nordman, the guitarist Marko Soukka and the keyboardist Kalle Koivisto, who also writes the songs for Kemopetrol. Kemopetrol's original bassist, Kari Myöhänen, left the band in July 2003. He was replaced by Lauri Hämäläinen who in turn left in 2008. All Kemopetrol songs have English lyrics. The name of the band originates from a Czech ice hockey team named Chemopetrol Litvínov.

== History ==
Marko Soukka and Kalle Koivisto founded Kemopetrol in November 1998, originally as an ambient music project. In December on the same year Koivisto met Laura Närhi at a party and later introduced her some songs he had written.

Laura Närhi joined the band in January 1999, followed by drummer Teemu Nordman and bassist Kari Myöhänen later same year. The band went to studio in July.

Kemopetrol's first single Child Is My Name was released at the end of 1999 and was a breakthrough success. In 2000, their debut album Slowed Down was released. Slowed Down contains music that is a mixture of rock, jazz and electronic music.

In 2001, a two-CD edition of the album Slowed Down was released. One CD is identical to the first release of Slowed Down, the other CD contains remixes and live performances. In addition to numerous gigs in Finland, the band also performed in Spain and Italy.

In March 2002, the single Saw It on TV and, two months later, the album Everything’s Fine were released.

In 2004, the single My Superstar and the album Play for Me were released. Having Kari left the band the previous year, on those releases, Kemopetrol's producer Kalle Chydenius plays bass. Shortly after the release of Play for Me, Lauri Hämäläinen joined the band as the new permanent bassist.

The band's fourth album, Teleport was released on 29 March 2006, preceded by Planet-single on 8 March. The album features disco influences from the 80's, including notable usage of synthesizer sounds from that era.

Laura Närhi also sings solo. She performs the song Se ei mee pois, which is found on the soundtrack of the movie Kuutamolla. She also provides the vocals for the Alimo&Control song Tarkkaillaan. Both Se ei mee pois and Tarkkaillaan have Finnish lyrics (and Finnish titles). Her first solo album Suuri sydän was released in August 2010.

The band started recording their fifth studio album in May 2008. Around this time, Lauri Hämäläinen left the band. In May 2010 the band announced that the recording of the album was on hold due to Laura's solo schedule. The fifth album, named A song & A Reason was released on 21 September 2011.

The band planned a 20th-anniversary tour for Slowed Down in 2020, but it was postponed due to the COVID-19 pandemic. In 2021, Kemopetrol performed several streaming concerts, summer festival gigs, and eventually a tour in the fall. On this tour, the band played Slowed Down in its entirety alongside selected tracks from other albums. The tour concluded with a sold-out show at Tavastia.

Kemopetrol released their sixth studio album Engine on January 24, 2025. The album was preceded by a series of single releases. Following the release, the band embarked on the Engine Tour in spring 2025, performing at venues across Finland, including Tavastia in Helsinki, G Livelab in Tampere, and Pensselitehdas in Porvoo. In the summer of 2025, Kemopetrol released the EP Extra Life.

After September 2025, the band went on an indefinite hiatus.

== Discography ==
=== Singles ===
- Child Is My Name (1999)
- Tomorrow (2000)
- African Air (2000)
- Disbelief (2000)
- Saw It on TV (2002)
- Goodbye (2002)
- My Superstar (2004)
- Planet (2006)
- Already Home (2006)
- Overweight & Underage (2006)
- Changing Lanes (2011)
- I Can See Across the World (2023)
- Are You Coming Home? (2024)
- Something’s Got to Change (2024)

=== Albums ===
- Slowed Down (2000)
- Slowed Down — Special 2CD Edition (2001)
- Everything’s Fine (2002)
- Play For Me (2004)
- Teleport (2006)
- A Song & A Reason (2011)
- Engine (2025)
- Extra Life EP (2025)
