= Air Guitar in Oulu =

- Directed by: Kent Sobey
- Starring: Andrew Buckles
- Country of origin: Canada
- Original language: English

Production
- Producers: Geoffrey Turnbull; Kent Sobey; Christopher Zimmer
- Cinematography: Les Krizsan

Original release
- Release: 12 June 2003

Air Guitar in Oulu is a 2003 documentary film by Canadian filmmaker Kent Sobey. The film was produced by the Farmhouse Productions with the support of the Canadian Television Fund. Air Guitar in Oulu was released on 12 June 2003 and distributed by iThentic.

The film follows the quest of Andrew "Air Raid" Buckles as he attempts to raise enough funds to travel to Oulu, Finland for the Air Guitar World Championships. His efforts include bake sales and street performance, backed by a boom box, of his air guitar techniques.

Buckles attends the competition and shares second place with Toby Peneha.
