= Pariisin Kevät =

Finnish music band

- Origin: Helsinki, Finland
- Genres: Indie pop, indie rock, electronic
- Years active: 2007–present
- Labels: Sony BMG
- Members: Arto Tuunela; Antti Pouta; Artturi Taira; Ilari Kivelä; Jussi Hietala; Reko Aho
- Website: www.pariisinkevat.com/

Pariisin Kevät (meaning Paris Spring in Finnish) is a Finnish indie-pop, indie-rock and electronic band from Helsinki, founded by Arto Tuunela in 2007. Pariisin Kevät began as a solo project and remained so for the first two studio albums. For the tour following the release of Astronautti, a live band was formed which also recorded the third studio album, Kaikki on satua.

Arto Tuunela previously founded the Finnish alternative group Major Label. Pariisin Kevät is signed to Sony BMG.

== Members ==
- Arto Tuunela – lead vocals (previously of the band Major Label)
- Antti Pouta – guitar, keyboards, backing vocals
- Artturi Taira – guitar, keyboards, backing vocals (from Rubik)
- Ilari Kivelä – keyboards, backing vocals
- Jussi Hietala – bass guitar
- Reko Aho – drums

== Discography ==
=== Albums ===
| Year | Album | Charts |
| Year | Album | FIN |
|---|---|---|
| 2008 | Meteoriitti | 12 |
| 2010 | Astronautti | 12 |
| 2012 | Kaikki on satua | 2 |
| 2013 | Jossain on tie ulos | 2 |
| 2015 | Musta laatikko | 2 |
| 2017 | Kuume | 1 |
| 2019 | Reuna | 4 |
| 2024 | Sun yö on pian Täällä | 4 |

=== EPs ===
- 2007: "Kattojen yllä" (made available online)

=== Singles ===
| Year | Single | Charts | Album |
| Year | Single | FIN | Album |
|---|---|---|---|
| 2008 | "Pikku Huopalahti" | 16 | Meteoriitti |
| 2010 | "Tämän kylän poikii" | 4 | Astronautti |
| 2012 | "Saari" | 17 | Kaikki on satua |
| 2012 | "Kesäyö" | 8 | Kaikki on satua |

Promotional non-charting singles

- 2007: "Samoilla raiteilla"
- 2008: "Meteoriitti"
- 2008: "Mä haluun sua enemmän ku muut haluu" (with Katri Ylander & Superjanne)
- 2009: "Joulujoulumaa"
- 2010: "Invisible Man"
- 2010: "Matkalla etelään"

== Videography ==
- Pikku Huopalahti
- Samoilla raiteilla
- Invisible Man
- Matkalla etelään
- Painovoimaa
- Imatrankoski
- Saari
- Kesäyö
- Kevät
- Häikäisee
- Odotus
- Mielikuvituksen tuotetta
- Oveton ovi
- Pimeyden tango
- Haamupuhelu
- Hän saapuu luokseni pimeydessä
- Outoja aikeita
- Hei mä soitan sulle ihan kohta
- Pilvissä
- Fantasiaa
