= Cultural Centre Valve =

- Kulttuuritalo Valve
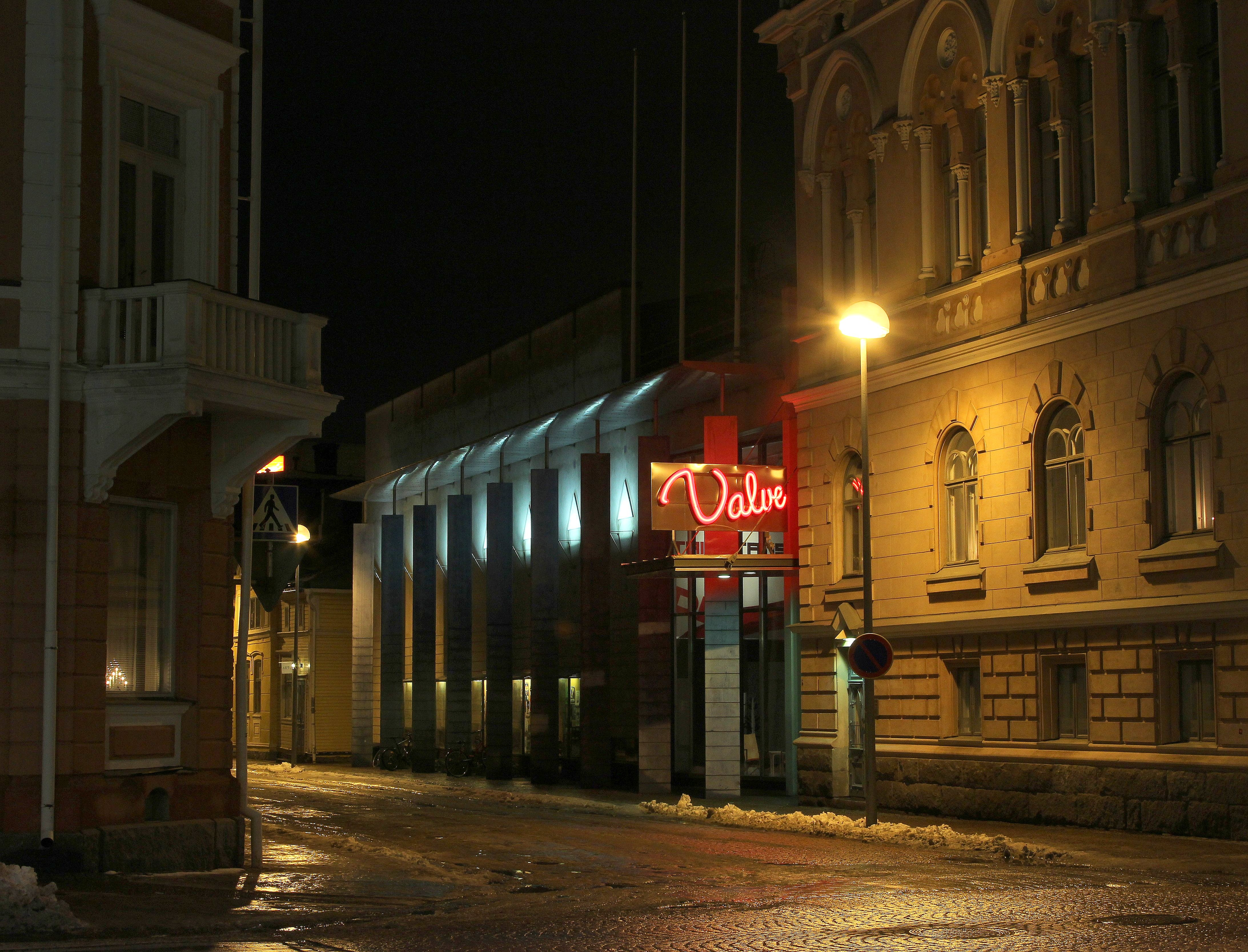
- Interactive map of the Cultural Centre Valve area
- Former names: NuKu

General information
- Type: Cultural center
- Location: Hallituskatu 7, Oulu, Finland
- Coordinates: 65°00′51″N 025°28′14″E
- Construction started: 1883
- Completed: 1884
- Renovated: 1894
- Owner: City of Oulu

Technical details
- Floor area: 3,500 m^{2} (38,000 sq ft)

Design and construction
- Architect: Johan Lybeck

Renovating team
- Architects: Grahn, Hedman & Wasastjerna

Website
- www.kulttuurivalve.fi

Cultural Centre Valve is a cultural center in the Pokkinen neighbourhood in Oulu, Finland.

The cultural center provides spaces for variety of cultural activities. There are two theatre stages, a cinema, galleries, workshops and other spaces in the building. The Valve has got the second largest film library in Finland. The film library as well as the cinema Studio are operated by the Oulu Film Centre. Northern Photographic Centre has got its office and galleries in the cultural center.

== History of the building ==
The Great Oulu Fire of 1882 destroyed the building located on the lot of the cultural center. A tradesman K.J. Granberg built the first two floors of the building after the fire in 1883–1884 according to the plans by architect Johan Lybeck. The city of Oulu bought the building after Granberg was declared bankrupt. The city hired the architect office Grahn, Hedman & Wasastjerna to plan an expansion of the building to be the new city hall. The building was widened and raised with one floor in 1893–1894. In addition to the municipal offices the building also hosted the Trade and Industry school of Oulu and the police station. In the 1950s prison cells were built near the building and from 1953 the building was entirely turned into police station.

The police station was relocated in the 1980s. The building was renovated as a youth and cultural center called NuKu by the city of Oulu in 1987–1989. The prison cells were replaced with a new modern building in 1992. In 2007 the youth activities moved into the nearby buildings, and the center was renamed to Valve.
