= Laura Närhi =

Finnish pop singer (born 1978)

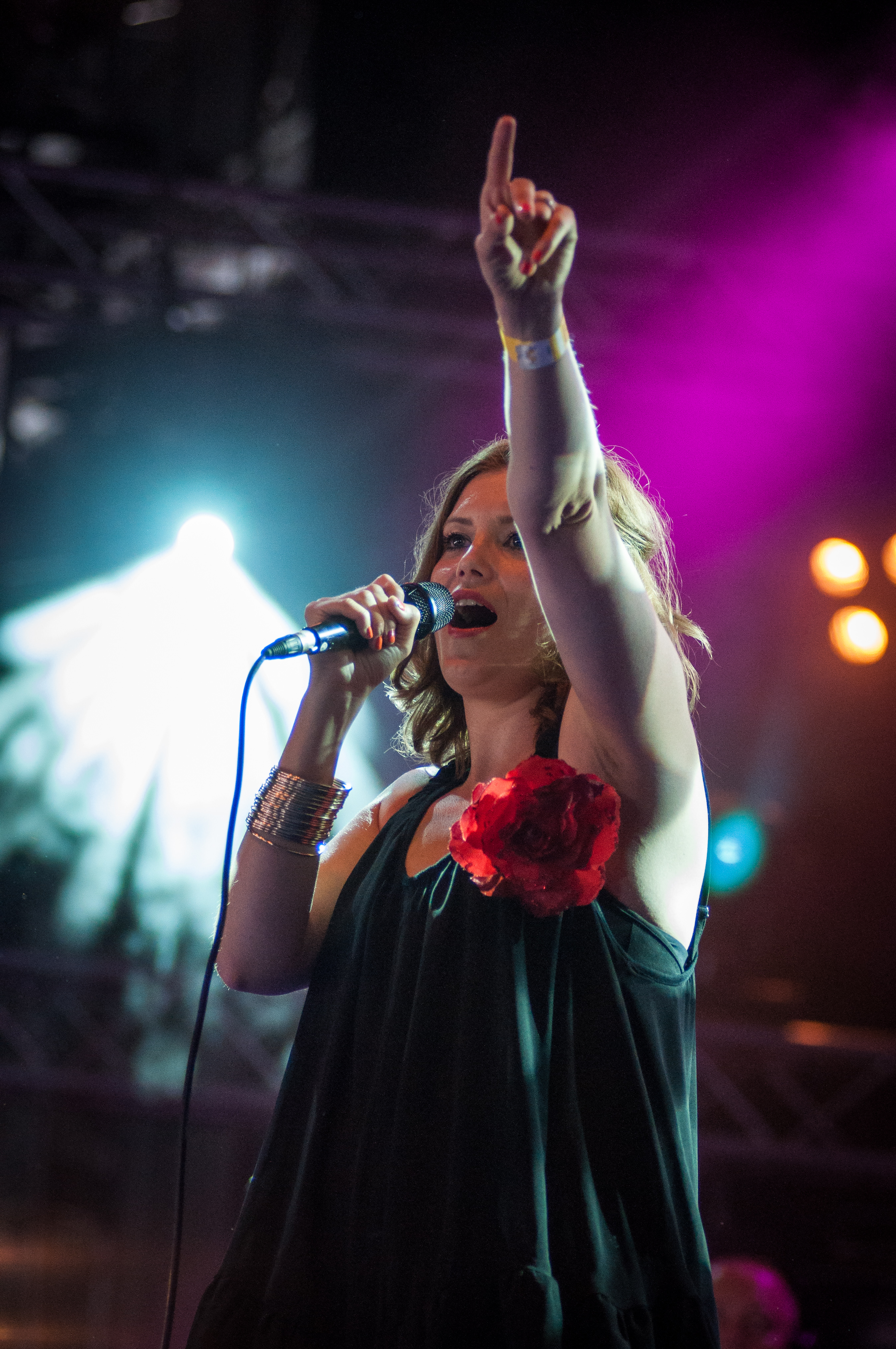
- Laura Närhi at the 2011 Ilosaarirock festival.

Background information
- Born: 19 January 1978 (age 48); Kirkkonummi, Finland
- Genres: Pop
- Occupation: Singer
- Website: www.lauranarhi.fi

Laura Närhi (born 19 January 1978) is a Finnish pop singer. The lead singer of Kemopetrol, she started a solo career and her debut solo album Suuri sydän was released in August 2010 and has sold over 30,000 copies in Finland. It peaked at number three on the Finnish Albums Chart.

== Discography ==
=== Albums ===
- 2010 Suuri sydän
- 2012 Tuhlari
- 2020 Vastavoimat

=== Singles ===
- 2002: "Kuutamolla (Se ei mee pois)"
- 2010: "Jää mun luo"
- 2010: "Tämä on totta"
- 2010: "Mä annan sut pois" I'll let you go
- 2011: "Kaksi irrallaan" Two Untethered
- 2012: "Hetken tie on kevyt"
- 2012: "Tuhlari"
- 2012: "Siskoni" My Sister (featuring Erin)
- 2017: "Olet mulle se"
