= Jonna Tervomaa =

Finnish pop singer and songwriter (born 1973)

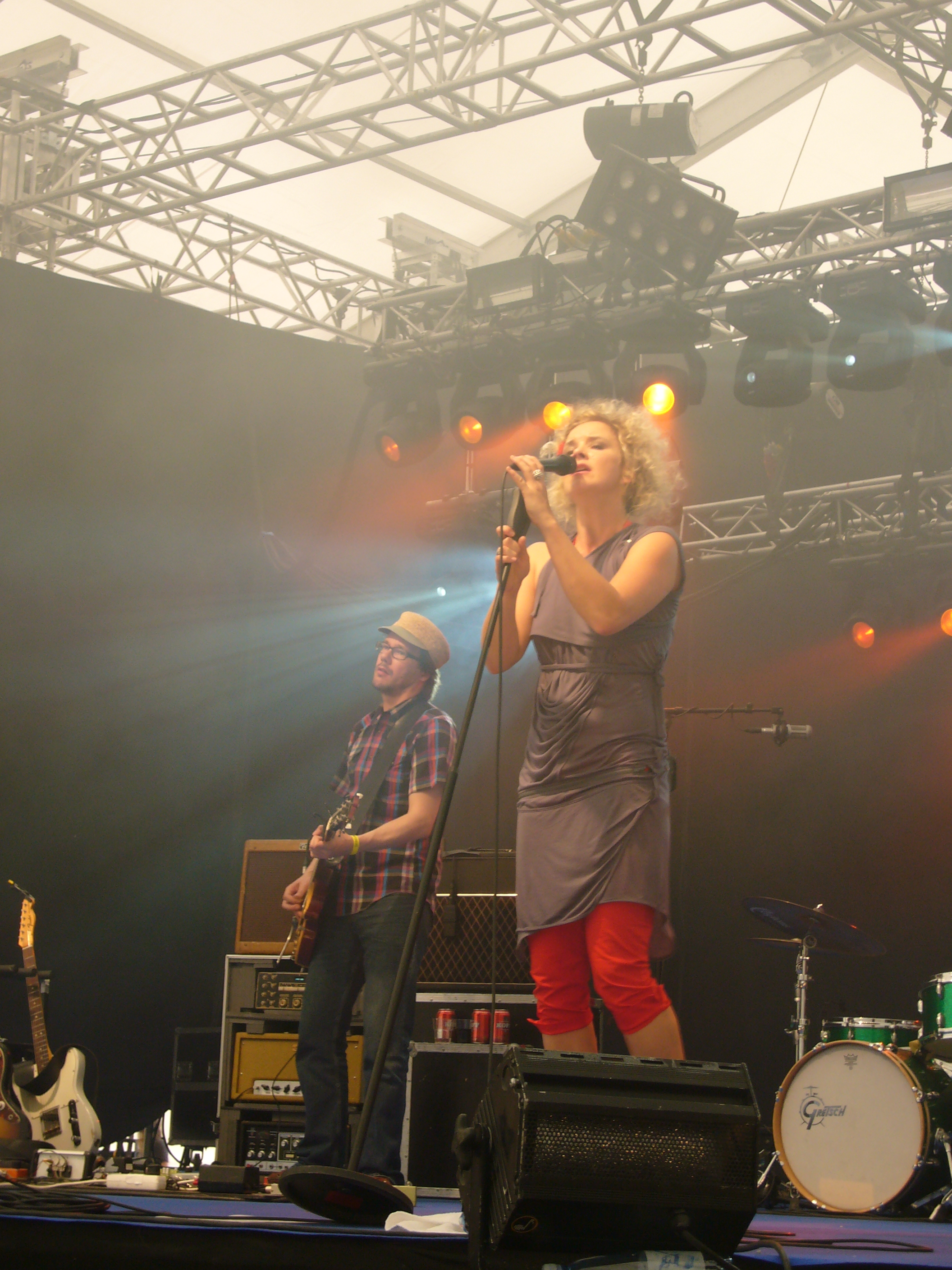
Jonna Tervomaa in 2008.

Jonna Marika Tervomaa (born January 7, 1973) is a Finnish pop singer and songwriter. She was born in Forssa, and became famous at the age of ten, when she won the song contest "Syksyn Sävel" with the song "Minttu sekä Ville". Tervomaa started her adult career in 1998 with her self-titled album.

Tervomaa's biggest hits include "Suljettu sydän" (1998), "Yhtä en saa" (1999), "Rakkauden haudalla" (Helmiä ja sikoja soundtrack, 2003), "Myöhemmin" (2004) and "Se ei kuulu mulle" (2004).

== Discography ==
=== Albums ===
Year	Album	Peak positions
Year	Album	FIN
1984	Jonna	
1985	Tykkään susta	
1986	Jonna	
1998	Jonna Tervomaa	15
1999	Neljä seinää	4
2001	Viivalla	5
2004	Halo	2
2007	Parempi loppu	1
2013	Eläköön	4
2017	Ääni	15

Compilations

Year	Album	Peak positions
Year	Album	FIN
1987	Parhaat	
2008	Lemmikit 1998 - 2008	28

=== Singles ===
Year	Single	Peak positions	Album
Year	Single	FIN	Album
1983	"Minttu sekä Ville"	5	Jonna
1999	"Yhtä en saa"	6	Neljä seinää
2001	"Tänään lähdetään"	19	Viivalla
2004	"Et tahdo tietää"	16	Halo
2008	"2x1=1" (with Ismo Alanko Teholla)	2	
