= Air Guitar World Championships =

Annual music event

Air Guitar World Championships (AGWC) is an annual event taking place in Oulu, Finland. AGWC was arranged for the first time in 1996. Today, national championships are held all around the world.

Playing air guitar is based on mimicking guitar playing. Music genres may vary, but the most common ones are heavy metal and rock.

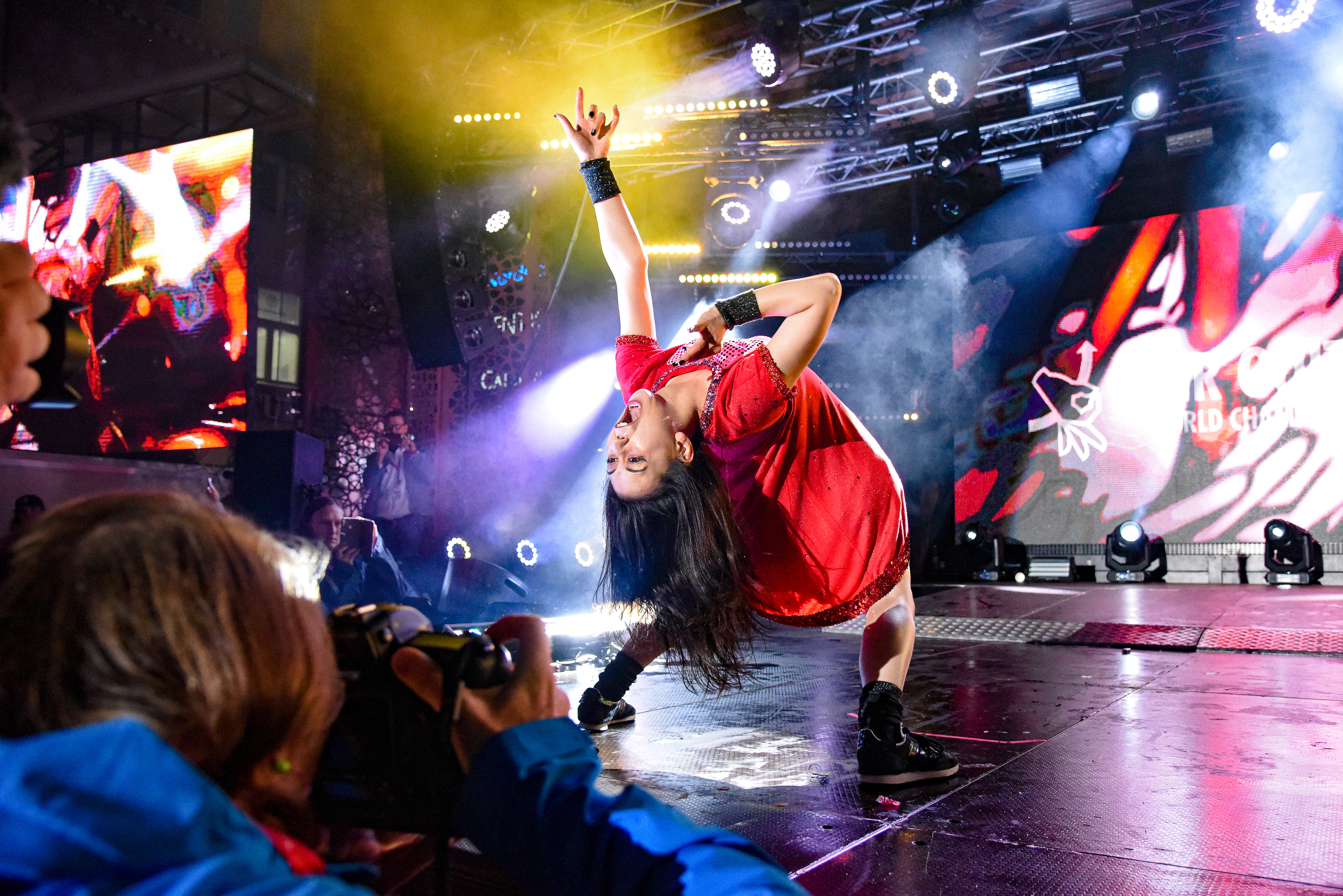
Nanami "Seven Seas" Nagura, Japan. Air Guitar World Championships final in Oulu, Finland. Photo: Juuso Haarala

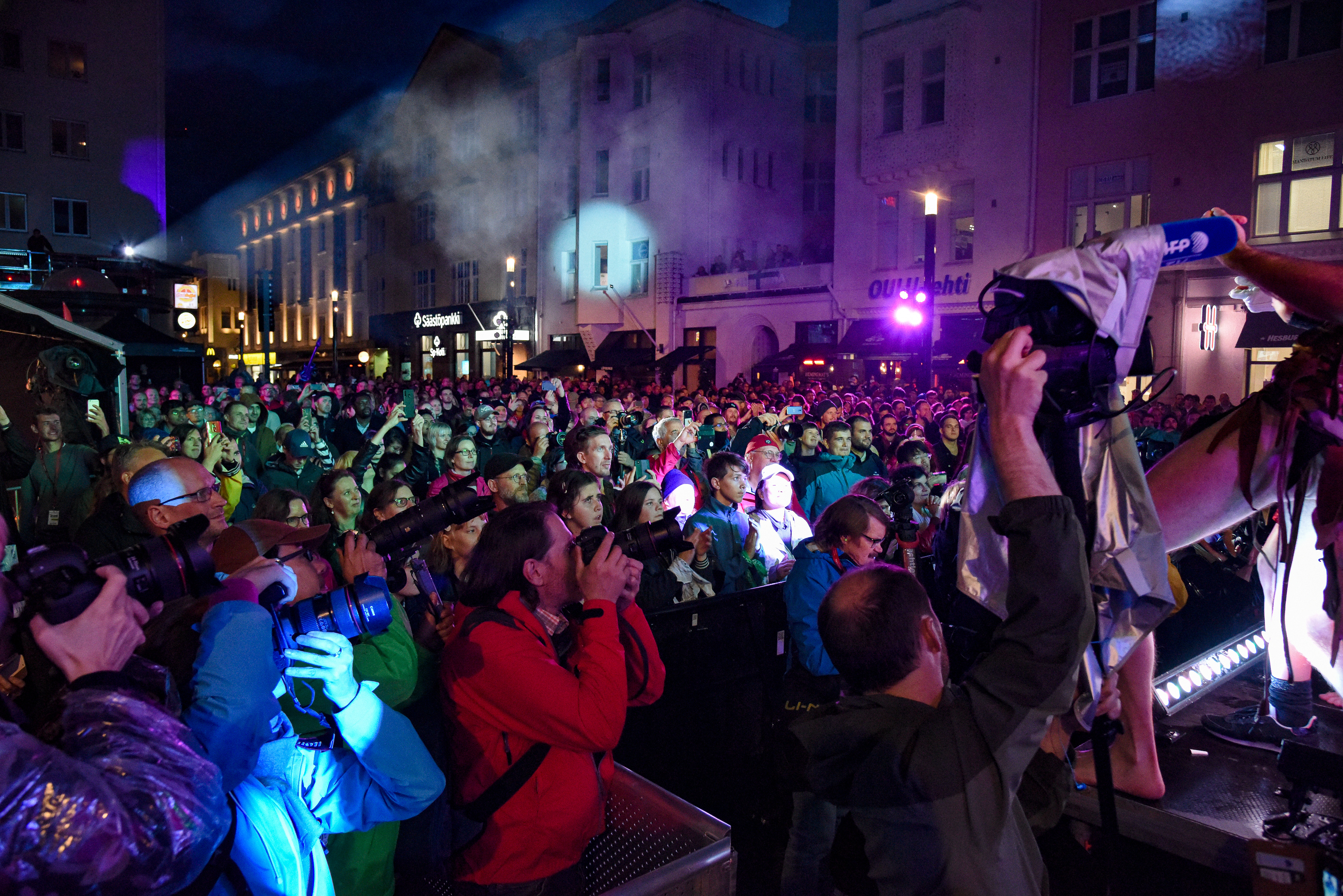
Crowd and media at the AGWC final. Photo: Juuso Haarala

The idea of having Air Guitar World Championships was generated by musician Jukka Takalo. The first competition was arranged in 1996 as part of Oulu Music Video Festival. Over the years, the contest has grown into its own event. Since 2011 it has been produced by Airnest Productions Ltd, which also takes care of the brand.

In the Air Guitar World Championships, participants from all over the world compete who can play the air guitar the best. The judges represent professionals of performing arts and culture, the guitarist Juha Torvinen among others. The winner gets a custom-made guitar, 'Flying Finn', by Matti and Saara Nevalainen. One year, Brian May, the lead guitarist of Queen, donated a VOX BM Special amplifier for the winner.

The Licensed national championships are held annually around the world in over 10 countries. In 2021, the countries in the official AGWC network are USA, Iceland, UK, Japan, Canada, France, Germany, Thailand, Australia, Belgium, Poland, Chile and Taiwan.

The AGWC motto is "Make Air Not War". The purpose of the contest is to promote world peace. According to the competition ideology, "wars will end, climate change will stop and all bad things will vanish when all the people in the world play the air guitar."

== Winners ==
Year	Gold	Silver	Bronze
2026	Aapo "The Angus" Rautio (FIN)	Nanami "Seven Seas" Nagura (JPN)	Saladin ”Six String Sal” Thomas (USA) / Kirill "Guitarantula" Blumenkrants (FRA)
2025	Aapo "The Angus" Rautio (FIN)	Yuta "Sudo-chan" Sudo (JPN)	Apolline "Lady Atilla" Andreys (FRA)
2024	Zachary "Ichabod Fame" Knowles (CAN)	Nanami "Seven Seas" Nagura (JPN) / Kirill "Guitarantula" Blumenkrants (FRA)	Patrick "Ehrwolf" Culek (GER)
2023	Nanami "Seven Seas" Nagura (JPN)	Aapo "The Angus" Rautio (FIN)	Kirill "Guitarantula" Blumenkrants (FRA)
2022	Kirill "Guitarantula" Blumenkrants (FRA)	Frederic "French Kiss" Reau (FRA)	Charles Kariuki "Slim" Ndung’u (KEN) / Alexander "The Jinja Assassin" Roberts (AUS) / Apolline "Lady Attila" Andreys (FRA)
2021 Champion of Champions	Justin "Nordic Thunder" Howard (USA)	Matt "Airistotle" Burns (USA)	Craig "Hot Lixx Hulahan" Billmeier (USA)
2019	Rob "The Marquis" Messel (USA)	Alexander "The Jinja Assassin" Roberts (AUS)	Frederic "French Kiss" Reau (FRA)
2018	Nanami "Seven Seas" Nagura (JPN)	Matt "Airistotle" Burns (USA)	Dana "Dana-Saurus Rex" Schiemann (CAN)
2017	Matt "Airistotle" Burns (USA)	Patrick "Ehrwolf" Culek (GER) / Alexander "The Jinja Assassin" Roberts (AUS)	SHOW-SHOW (JPN)
2016	Matt "Airistotle" Burns (USA)	Kirill "Your Daddy" Blumenkrants (RUS)	Nicole "Mom Jeans Jeanie" Sevcik (USA)
2015	Kirill "Your Daddy" Blumenkrants (RUS)	Matt "Airistotle" Burns (USA)	Michael "Operation Rock a Pussy" Lovely (USA)
2014	Nanami "Seven Seas" Nagura (JPN)	Matt "Airistotle" Burns (USA)	Eric "Mean Melin" Melin (USA)
2013	Eric "Mean Melin" Melin (USA)	Doug "The Thunder" Stroock (USA)	Thom "W!ld Th!ng 37" Wilding (GBR)
2012	Justin "Nordic Thunder" Howard (USA)	Matt "Airistotle" Burns (USA)	Theun "Tremelo Theun" de Jong (NED)
2011	Aline "The Devil's Niece" Westphal (GER)	Justin "Nordic Thunder" Howard (USA)	Veronika "Like Ever Gin" Müllerová (CZE)
2010	Sylvain "Gunther Love" Quimene (FRA)	Soraya "Eva Gina Runner" Garlenq (FRA)	Cole "Johnny Utah" Manson (CAN)
2009	Sylvain "Gunther Love" Quimene (FRA)	Craig "Hot Lixx Hulahan" Billmeier / Andrew "William Ocean" Litz (USA)	Christian "Girth Hog" Hungagain (USA)
2008	Craig "Hot Lixx Hulahan" Billmeier (USA)	Andel "John Sniffler" Soree (NED)	Cole "Johnny Utah" Manson (CAN)
2007	Ochi "Dainoji" Yosuke (JPN)	Guillaume "Moche Pitt" de Tonquédec (FRA)	Max "Herr Jaquelin" Heller (AUT)
2006	Ochi "Dainoji" Yosuke (JPN)	Clay "Bangers" Connolly (AUS)	Christian "Heart Buckboard" Sweep (GER)
2005	Michael "Destroyer" Heffels (NED)	Natalie "Nat Attack" Willacy (AUS)	Pelvis Fenderbender (NED)
2004	Tarquin "The Tarkness" Keys (NZL)	Miri "Sonyk-Rok" Park (USA)	David "C-Diddy" Jung (USA)
2003	David "C-Diddy" Jung (USA)	Jordi "Funky Jordi" Nieuwenburg (NED)	Mark "Roxy McStagger" Hadfield (AUS)
2002	Zac "Mr. Magnet" Monro (GBR)	Toby Peneha (NZL)	Andrew Buckles (CAN)
2001	Zac "Mr. Magnet" Monro (GBR)	Markus Vainionpää (FIN)	Rupert Abrahams (GBR)
2000	Markus Vainionpää (FIN)	Sari Rivinen (FIN)	Anthony Lee (AUS)
1999	Johanna Ala-Siurua (FIN)	Petteri Tikkanen (FIN)	Arnaud Stephan (FRA)
1998	Juha Hippi (FIN)	Teja Kotilainen (FIN)	Danny Turano (AUS)
1997	Ville Paakkari (FIN)	Jenni Pääskysaari (FIN)	Mika Mäntykenttä (FIN)
1996	Oikku Ylinen (FIN)	Rehtori-Heko (FIN)	Petri Heikkinen (FIN)
