= Guitar Rockstar =

Virtual air guitar toy by Tomy

Guitar Rockstar is the European brand name for a virtual air guitar, manufactured by Tomy. It originated and continues to be sold by Tomy in Japan under the brand name "Air Guitar". Gameplay consists of holding buttons representing notes and strumming where the strings would be, in a similar fashion to air guitar. An infra-red beam passes from the end of the guitar head, and as the hand passes through the invisible infra-red beam a note is played.

Guitar Rockstar was launched in the UK with eight licensed pre-programmed rock songs:

- 1 - "Wild Thing" by The Troggs
- 2 - "Smoke on the Water" by Deep Purple
- 3 - "I Love Rock 'n' Roll" by Joan Jett and the Blackhearts
- 4 - "One Vision" by Queen
- 5 - "I Believe in a Thing Called Love" by The Darkness
- 6 - "Take Me Out" by Franz Ferdinand
- 7 - "Change the World" by Eric Clapton
- 8 - "Venus" by Shocking Blue

Guitar Rockstar was launched in Europe in 2008, and a competition in association with MTV was used to launch the product.

Colour variations

As of 2008, Guitar Rockstar was available in three colour variations

- Black / brown
- Red / black
- Blue / yellow
