= Lodger (Finnish band) =

Finnish rock band

- Origin: Helsinki and Tampere, Finland
- Genres: Indie rock, alternative rock
- Years active: 2002–2013: 2025
- Labels: Onomato Pop; EMI Finland; Rykodisc; Urbanited Music
- Members: Teemu Merilä; Antti Laari; J.Mäkikojola
- Past members: Hannes Häyhä; Jyri Riikonen; Richard Anderson; Panu Riikonen; Juho Viljanen

Lodger is a rock band formed in Finland by Teemu Merilä in 2002. Although largely unknown outside of Finland, they have established a cult following on the Internet due to the popularity of their Flash music videos.

== History ==
In the latter half of 2002 singer/songwriter Teemu Merilä created Lodger as a vehicle for his music, bringing together Jyri Riikonen on keyboards, Hannes Häyhä on bass, Antti Laari on drums, and London-based Richard Anderson on guitar. They self released their first album Hi-Fi High Lights Down Low, and Häyhä also directed four animated music videos. Two singles were released by EMI Finland, "I Love Death", as well as the new song "24hr Candy Machine", and a re-release of the album was produced by German label Onomato Pop in 2005. This version contained a different track listing, as well all four music videos which were accessible by CD-ROM. It was later released in the United States via on 13 March 2007 in the United States via Rykodisc.

Their second album How Vulgar was released internationally in 2007. It contained the song "Floozy with an Uzi" which is taken from the novel Vineland by Thomas Pynchon, which was also released as a single.

In the spring of 2008, Lodger released three new songs and redesigned their website. Their third album, Honeymoon is Over, was released on 19 November 2008 via Urbanited Music.

In June 2009 Lodger indicated via Twitter that their next album would be titled Sunday of a Male Shouvinist. However, in February 2012, the band announced a new website which stated their next album would be titled Low Blue Flame and would be available to download for free. After a while, they made two songs from the new album available for listening on their website. On 25 December 2013 the other eight songs of Low Blue Flame was made available for listening on their site. On 9 January 2014 the band put up a mastered version of Low Blue Flame for free download on their website. The band has also stated that the album would see a CD-release some time in the future. This was a special release limited to 200 copies.

Following Teemu Merilä's solo album My Ptosis, released under the name of Lake Huttula in 2022, the band was given something of a revival in 2025. New Instagram and Youtube accounts were set up alongside the announcement of "the new and the final Lodger album" which would be titled Flotsam, later described as "mostly previously unreleased tracks recorded during 2002 - 2007 in chronological order". This was also accompanied by the singles "God Has Rejected The Western World", previously released as a music video only, and "Manneken Pis", named after the statue of the same name in Brussels. Two live dates were also announced.

Although "Flotsam" was described as "the final Lodger album", the Youtube channel still lists Teemu Merilä, Antti Laari, and J.Mäkikojola as "present" members, and the band are still performing live.

== Musical Style ==
Lodger's lyrics are often cynical and nihilistic; their discography includes such titles as "I Love Death" which details the drudgery in life of the average person and "God Has Rejected the Western World", an anthem decrying the superficiality of western society. Their unabashed attitude is most apparent in their music videos, which prominently features smoking, drinking, sex, masturbation, rape and death.

In Low Blue Flame, the same cynical style was applied to biblical figures. For instance, Song of Job is a written monologue by the titular character from the Book of Job.

== Visual Style ==
Along with the release of Hi-Fi High Lights Down Low, Lodger became known online for their distinctive animated music videos and website featuring simple stick figures. Original bassist Hannes Häyhä directed two flash animation music videos for "Doorsteps" and "I Love Death", as well as two adverts featuring their music; one for Sabotaz featuring "God Has Rejected The Western World", and one for Idea Protector featuring "24hr Candy Machine".

Their first website, lodger.tv took the form of a fairground shooting gallery where, in order to click on a link to a specific page, users first had to shoot a moving target. This was later changed to a slot machine where a user would have to align three symbols to access different pages showcasing the bands music, videos, etc.

The band's branding changed significantly for the release of Honeymoon is Over, with the new website design consisting of white skeletons on a black background. The main page of the website consisted of four links depicted by skeletons referencing a variation of three wise monkeys, each of which covering their ears (linking to the band's music), eyes (videos), mouth (information), and groin (contact) respectively. This was accompanied by a new video for "Go", which depicted an identical skeleton running past others which fall apart.

In contrast to this, when releasing Low Blue Flame their second website lodger.fi instead consisted of nothing more than black text on a white background. Users could select an individual song to listen to, or links were available to download the entire album, but the hand printed limited edition CD, or contact the band.

As at 2026, both websites are defunct, although four of the five videos have been uploaded in HD to the band's new Youtube channel. "24hr Candy Machine" was not uploaded due to Häyhä not wanting it to be re-released.

== Discography ==
=== Hi-Fi High Lights Down Low (2004) ===
1. "Two Smiles is a Long Walk"
2. "Fickle"
3. "Bad Place to Earn a Living"
4. "I Love Death"
5. "Short Man on TV"
6. "Radio"
7. "Ordinary Men Make Ordinary Music"
8. "Doorsteps"
9. "Everyone Got to Go"
10. "Divine Right"
11. "Big Day"
12. "When I Was Six"
13. "Siamese Cats"

=== Hi-Fi High Lights Down Low (Remastered) (2005) ===
1. "Two Smiles is a Long Walk"
2. "24h Candy Machine"
3. "Bad Place to Earn a Living"
4. "I Love Death"
5. "Radio"
6. "Doorsteps"
7. "Short Man on TV"
8. "Ordinary Men Make Ordinary Music"
9. "Fickle"
10. "Big Day"
11. "When I Was Six"
12. "Siamese Cats"

=== How Vulgar (2007) ===
1. "Truck Driver"
2. "Friends"
3. "Satan"
4. "Floozy With an Uzi"
5. "Steal & Lie"
6. "Wrong Bus"
7. "Under One God"
8. "Escape Plan"
9. "I Would Like to Fulfill Your Dreams"
10. "Brunswick Centre"
11. "Don't Go Home Tonight"
12. "Whatever the Weather"

=== Honeymoon Is Over (2008) ===
1. "Requiem"
2. "Chemicals"
3. "Nostalgia"
4. "Hairdo"
5. "Recovering Alcoholic Visits Musso & Frank"
6. "So Long"
7. "I Was Young I Needed the Money"
8. "Prefontaine"
9. "Problems With Fat"
10. "Girlfriend"
11. "Go"

=== Low Blue Flame (2013) ===
1. "All in this World"
2. "Song of Job"
3. "Son Father Holy Ghost"
4. "Smoking for Jesus"
5. "Lord is my Feeder"
6. "Devil's Mind"
7. "Lets get Married"
8. "Every God Damn Morning"
9. "When Our Days"
10. "Silent Friend"

=== Flotsam (2025) ===
1. "She Took Everything"
2. "Heading Ahead The Headache"
3. "Divine Right"
4. "Everyone Got to Go One Day"
5. "God Has Rejected The Western World"
6. "Rent"
7. "768"
8. "Mannekin Pis"
9. "This Is What You Get For Getting Out Of Bed"
10. "Verbal"
11. "Most Beautiful Girl in the World"
12. "Electric Light"

"Divine Right" and "Everyone Got to Go One Day" had previously been released on the initial Hi Fi High Lights Down Low (2004). "Rent" is also an acoustic version of "all in this world", released on Low Blue Flame.

== Music videos ==
- "Doorsteps"
- "I Love Death"
- "God Has Rejected the Western World"
- "24h Candy Machine"
- "Go"
- "Manneken Pis"
