= List of Swedish folk musicians =

- O'tôrgs-Kaisa Abrahamsson (Hälsingland)
- Hasse Alatalo (Norrbotten)
- Kalle Almlöf (Dalarna)
- Leif Alpsjö
- Benny Andersson
- Erik Ask-Uppmark
- Styrbjörn Bergelt (Uppland)
- Pelle Björnlert (Östergötland)
- Ola Bäckström (Dalarna)
- Fredy Clue (Gothenburg)
- Mats Edén
- Anna Elwing (Halland)
- Erik Englund (Jämtland)
- Kjell-Erik Eriksson
- Ulf Gruvberg
- Per Gudmundson (Dalarna)
- Einar Hansander (Dalsland)
- Johan Hedin
- Merit Hemmingson
- Ole Hjort
- Emma Härdelin (Jämtland and Hälsingland)
- Sven Härdelin (Hälsingland)
- Thore Härdelin (Hälsingland)
- Peter "Puma" Hedlund (Uppland)
- Pehr Hörberg (Småland)
- Bo Isaksson "Bo i Ransätt" (Värmland)
- Åsa Jinder (Uppland)
- Olov Johansson
- Sofia Karlsson
- Roland Keijser
- Hans Kennemark (Västergötland)
- Carin Kjellman
- Gudmunds Nils Larsson (Dalarna)
- Anders Liljefors (Uppland)
- Svante Lindqvist (Norrbotten)
- Bengt Lindroth (Värmland)
- Bengt Löfberg (Småland)
- Dan "Gisen" Malmquist
- Mikael Marin
- Hållbus Totte Mattson
- Kalle Moraeus (Dalarna)
- Ale Möller
- Kungs Levi Nilsson (Dalarna)
- Carina Normansson (Dalarna)
- Anders Norudde
- Hjort Anders Olsson (Dalarna)
- Pers Hans Olsson
- Eric Öst (1906–1984)
- Jon-Erik Öst (1885–1968)
- Anders Rosén (Dalarna)
- Susanne Rosenberg
- Sture Sahlström (Uppland)
- Jonny Soling
- Göran Sjölén (Medelpad)
- Marie Stensby (Bohuslän)
- Leif Stinnerbom
- Björn Ståbi (Dalarna)
- August Strömberg (Småland)
- Janne Strömstedt
- Ulf Störling (Hälsingland)
- Roger Tallroth
- Karin Wallin (Skåne)
- Ale Carr (Skåne)
- Evert Wernberg (Medelpad)
- Werner Wernberg (Medelpad)
- Mats Wester
- Bertil Westling (Hälsingland)
- Hugo Westling (Hälsingland)
- Lena Willemark (Dalarna)
- Tony Wretling (Gästrikland)

== Folk music groups ==
- Alwa (folk music group)
- Arbete och Fritid
- Avadå Band
- Bazar Blå
- Boot
- Bäsk
- Den Fule
- Dreamers' Circus
- Filarfolket
- Folk och Rackare
- Francis
- Frifot
- Garmarna
- Gjallarhorn (Finlands-Svensk)
- Groupa
- Harv
- Hedningarna
- Horn Please!
- Hoven Droven
- Kebnekajse
- Kolonien
- Kongero
- Ni:d
- Nordanstigs spelmanslag
- Nordman
- Norrlåtar (Norrbotten)
- Norrtelje Elitkapell (Uppland)
- Nyckelharporkestern
- JP Nyströms
- Ranarim
- Rosenbergs Sjua
- Sarek
- Skäggmanslaget (Hälsingland)
- Swåp
- Triakel
- Väsen
