= Förbundet =

Studio album by Garmarna
- Released: 6 November 2020
- Genre: Folk rock, Folktronica
- Length: 41:52
- Label: Season of Mist
- Producer: Stefan Brisland-Ferner, Christopher Juul

Garmarna chronology
| 6 (2016) | Förbundet (2020) |

Förbundet (in English The Federation) is the seventh studio album by the Swedish folk rock band Garmarna. Released in 2020, it is their first album on the Season of Mist label. Unlike the previous album 6 and similar to albums before that, Förbundet is again dominated by traditional instruments, melodies and lyrics, although there are still numerous electronic influences. These were added in cooperation with Christopher Juul of Heilung who also produced the album. Most tracks tell sinister folklore stories but the album includes two original titles written entirely by Garmarna. Anders Norudde of Hedningarna, Maria Franz of Heilung and Swedish folk singer Ulf Gruvberg appear as guest musicians.

== Themes ==
The album focuses on dark folklore and on themes like departure, jealousy, old age, longing and tristesse. E.g. the first track and first single of the album references the fierce warrior Ramunder who, according to the band, "likes to smite his enemies out of pure joy."

== Reception ==
Förbundet received mostly favourable professional reviews. Metal Hammer Portugal praised the work of lead singer Emma Härdelin and wrote that the album likened releases by Liz Fraser and the Cocteau Twins. According to their reviewer, "Förbundet comes at a time when we most need shamanic rhythms in a call to unite the tribes." The Sonic Seducer stated that the album constantly displayed a high artistic level in a musical mix that was unique to Garmarna. The Swedish Lira magazine called Förbundet the best Garmarna album since Guds spelemän (1996) and also mentioned Garmarna's "unique signature". Dagens Nyheter, however, wrote that Garmana had lost their orientation on an album that was "clinically devoid of warmth".

== Track listing ==
There are nine tracks on this album most of which are adaptations of traditional themes.

| No. | Title | Writer(s) | Length |
|---|---|---|---|
| 1. | "Ramunder" (feat. Anders Norudde) | traditional, Stefan Brisland-Ferner | 4:58 |
| 2. | "Två Systrar (Two Sisters)" (feat. Maria Franz) | trad., Brisland-Ferner, Emma Härdelin, Jens Höglin | 5:53 |
| 3. | "Dagen Flyr (The Day is flying by)" | trad., Brisland-Ferner | 3:51 |
| 4. | "Sven i Rosengård (Sven of Rosengård)" | trad., Brisland-Ferner | 5:25 |
| 5. | "Ur världen att gå (Leaving this World)" | trad., Brisland-Ferner, Härdelin | 4:52 |
| 6. | "Vägskäl (Crossing)" | Brisland-Ferner, Härdelin | 4:56 |
| 7. | "Lussi Lilla (Little Lussi)" (feat. Ulf Gruvberg) | trad., Brisland-Ferner, Folk & Rackare | 4:35 |
| 8. | "Avskedet (Departure)" | trad., Brisland-Ferner, Härdelin | 5:27 |
| 9. | "Din Grav (Your Grave)" | Brisland-Ferner, Härdelin | 1:56 |
| Total length: | | | 41:52 |

== Personnel ==
Apart from the core members of Garmarna, Förbundet was recorded together with three guest musicians.

=== Music ===
Garmarna

- Emma Härdelin: vocals, violin
- Stefan Brisland-Ferner: violin, viola, hurdy-gurdy, Nordic bowed harp, moraharpa, kantele, guitar, electronics, vocals
- Gotte Ringqvist: acoustic guitars, Hardanger fiddle, vocals
- Rickard Westman: guitar, bass
- Jens Höglin: drums, electronics

Guests

- Anders Norudde: moraharpa
- Maria Franz: vocals
- Ulf Gruvberg: vocals

=== Production ===
- Stefan Brisland-Ferner
- Christopher Juul
