= NorthSide =

- Founded: 1990
- Country of origin: United States
- Location: Minneapolis, Minnesota

NorthSide is a record label based in Minneapolis, Minnesota that specializes in Nordic roots music. It is associated with Omnium Recordings and East Side Digital. Its president is Rob Simonds, one of the founders of Rykodisc.

The label was most active during the late 1990s and early 2000s, when it played an important role in promoting the music of the Nordic folk revival in North America. It held the North American distribution right for many Nordic folk and neo-folk musicians, and released the successful, low-priced sampler CDs Nordic Roots 1, 2, and 3. Although still in existence, the label currently has only one band under contract, Väsen, and has retired most of its catalog.

== Musicians ==
Musicians released under this label include:

- Mari Boine
- Den Fule
- Garmarna
- Gjallarhorn (band)
- Hedningarna
- Hoven Droven
- JPP
- Sanna Kurki-Suonio
- Loituma
- Anders Norudde
- Triakel
- Värttinä
- Väsen
- Wimme

== See also ==
- List of record labels
