= Hanni Autere =

Finnish Fiddle-Singer, folk singer, and musician

- Born: Hanni-Mari Autere; 1969 (age 56–57)
- Education: Sibelius Academy DMus (2011); Sibelius Academy MMus (1989-1998)
- Occupation: Fiddle-Singer
- Known for: Ievan polkka
- Musical career
- Genres: Folk music
- Instruments: Vocals; Violin; Piano; Guitar; Recorder; Mandolin; Kantele; Double bass; Pump organ; Accordion
- Years active: 1989–present
- Website: www.hanniautere.com

Hanni-Mari Autere (also known as Hanni Autere) is a Finnish fiddle-singer, folk singer, and musician. She is a member of Loituma. Autere has become known for the singing freestyle in the song Ievan polkka as a part of Loituma music group which has later become known as a Leekspin girl meme.

== Career ==
Hanni is a versatile musician who enjoys numerous roles in the field of art. She graduated with a doctorate in music in 2011 from the folk music subject group of the Sibelius Academy.

== Discography ==
=== Albums ===
Puhun puille (2004)
1	Aapon hambo	2	Menuett I
3	Inttäjäispolska	4	Puhun puille
5	Kesäsade	6	Meret suuret sulavat
7	Lempilintu	8	Masurkkaamo
9	Hieho saunapolulla	10	Saattomarssi
11	Hirvipolska		

Krazem (2013)
1	Krazem, part 1	2	Krazem, part 2
3	Hämärä	4	Helios
5	Ilta	6	Valon aika, part 1
7	Valon aika, part 2	8	Tuokio (Live Improvisation)

On the Way and There (2019)
1	Departure	2	Challenge
3	The Spring	4	Souvenirs
5	Arrival		
Elean
6	Kyynelvirroin kasteltu (Watered With Tears)	7	Kirsikankukat (Cherry Blossoms)
8	Elossa (Alive)		
