= Hedningarna (album) =

Studio album by Hedningarna
- Released: 1989
- Recorded: February 1989
- Studio: Tur-Teatern
- Genre: Folk
- Label: NorthSide
- Producer: Jonas Simonnson, Niklas Billström

Professional ratings
Review scores
Source	Rating
Allmusic	link

Hedningarna is the debut album by the Swedish band Hedningarna. It was released in 1989, when Hedningarna was still a group with three members. Unlike the other albums, the debut does not include amplified instruments and rhythm loops and is played entirely with acoustic instrumentation.

Using various instruments, such as hurdy-gurdies, moraharpas, bagpipes and fiddles, the album proves Hedningarnas' ability to mix old and new styles, and the album honors the old Scandinavian musical traditions, while managing to combine these with more modern sounds.

The album was later released on the NorthSide label.

== Track listing ==
- All song written by Anders Stake, except where noted.
1. Polska After Pelle Fors – 3:30 (trad.)
2. Förtvivlans Polska/Desperation Polska – 2:10
3. Häxpolskan/The Witch Polska – 2:23
4. Skavlåten/The Chafing Tune – 3:02
5. Ölbackens Polska – 4:05
6. Särna Gamla Brudmarsch/Old Särna Wedding March – 3:51 (trad.)
7. Multihalling – 2:58
8. Fulinghalling/Scamphalling – 5:33
9. Polska After Olof Tillman – 4:35 (trad.)
10. Doplåten/The Baptism Tune – 0:44
11. Polska After Hins Anders – 1:44
12. Lacknafta – 3:10
13. Björnlåten/The Bear Tune – 3:49 (trad.)

== Personnel ==
- Anders Stake: Hardingfele, Three-String Keyed Fiddle, Swedish Bagpipes, Nyckelharpa, Jew's Harp, Wooden Flute, Willow Pipe
- Björn Tollin: Frame Drum, Marxophone, Three-String Keyed Fiddle
- Hållbus Totte Mattsson: Lute, Acoustic Guitar, Baroque Guitar, Hurdy Gurdy
