= Loituma =

Finnish a cappella quartet

- Also known as: Jäykkä Leipä
- Origin: Helsinki, Finland
- Genres: Folk, a cappella
- Years active: 1989–2008
- Label: NorthSide
- Members: Anita Lehtola-Tollin; Hanni-Mari Autere; Sari Kauranen; Timo Väänänen
- Past members: Sanna Kurki-Suonio; Tellu Turkka

Loituma was a Finnish quartet whose members combined the Finnish vocal tradition with the sounds of the kantele. Loituma were selected Ensemble of the Year at the 1997 Kaustinen Folk Music Festival.

== History ==
Loituma's initial incarnation was in the autumn of 1989 as a septet called Jäykkä Leipä ("Stiff Bread"), born in the Sibelius Academy's Folk music department. The original lineup included singers Sanna Kurki-Suonio and Tellu Paulasto, who later left for Sweden to join Hedningarna.

Over the years, the group has persistently followed its own musical path, incorporating diverse influences into its music. One of the cornerstones of Finnish folk music is the art of singing, through which the stories and feelings which comprise aspects of the Finnish heritage are conveyed, aided by backing musicians Martti Pokela and Toivo Alaspää. Another cornerstone of Loituma's art is a Finnish folk instrument called the kantele, which is featured in varied ways in their recordings.

Loituma members compose or arrange the tunes themselves, but often use improvisation. Lyrics come from many sources, including two main traditional sources: the Kalevala, the national epic of Finland; and the Kanteletar (Lönnrot's collection of Finnish folk poetry). The lyrics are in Finnish.

Loituma gained great popularity in 2006 when the Loituma Girl (also known as Leekspin), a looped flash animation of an anime girl Orihime Inoue from the Bleach series twirling a leek, set to a scat singing section of "Ievan polkka" from Loituma's 1995 debut album Things of Beauty, was posted in Russian LiveJournal. The animation instantly became an Internet phenomenon and the song clip soon enjoyed overwhelming popularity as a ringtone.

== Band members ==
- Anita Lehtola-Tollin — vocals, 5-string kantele
- Hanni-Mari Autere — vocals, fiddle, 5-string kantele, alto recorder, double bass, Lapin drum
- Sari Kauranen — kanteles, vocals
- Timo Väänänen — kanteles, vocals

== Discography ==
=== Albums ===
- Loituma (released in Finland in 1995) / Things of Beauty (released in the United States in 1998)
- Kuutamolla (released in Finland in 1998) / In the Moonlight (released in United States in 1999)

=== Singles ===
List of singles with chart positions and album name
Title	Year	Peak chart positions	Album
Title	Year	GER	Album
"Ieva's polka"	2007	48	Loituma
