= Vedergällningen =

Vedergällningen (The Retribution)

Studio album by Garmarna
- Released: April 6, 1999
- Genre: Folk
- Label: NorthSide

Garmarna chronology
Guds spelemän (1996)	Vedergällningen (The Retribution) (1999)	Hildegard von Bingen (2001)

Professional ratings
Review scores
Source	Rating
Allmusic	link

Vedergällningen (The Retribution) is Garmarna's third full-length album. All the songs are sung in Swedish. "Euchari" also contains some Latin.

== Track listing ==
1. "Gamen (The Vulture)" – 4:01
2. "Euchari" – 4:21
3. "Halling Jåron" – 3:03
4. "Vedergällningen (The Retribution)" – 4:55
5. "Nio år (Nine Years)" – 4:29
6. "Sorgsen ton (Sorrowful Tone)" – 4:47
7. "Herr Holkin (Sir Holkin)" – 5:17
8. "Bläck (Ink)" – 5:05
9. "Polska" – 3:07
10. "Brun (Brown)" – 8:28

== Credits ==
- drums: Jens Höglin
- guitar: Rickard Westman
- Guitar, violin: Gotte Ringqvist, Stefan Brisland-Ferner
- production, arrangement, bass: Sank
- vocals: Emma Härdelin

== Charts ==
Chart performance for Vedergällningen
Chart (1999)	Peak position
Swedish Albums (Sverigetopplistan)	40
