= Dreamers' Circus =

Nordic band

- Origin: Denmark, Sweden
- Genres: New Nordic, classical, instrumental, indie
- Years active: 2009–present
- Label: GO' Folk Vertical Records
- Members: Rune Tonsgaard Sørensen - violin, piano, guitar, keys; Ale Carr - cittern, violin, clog fiddle, kannel, ukulele, guitar; Nikolaj Busk - piano, accordion, keys
- Website: www.dreamerscircus.com

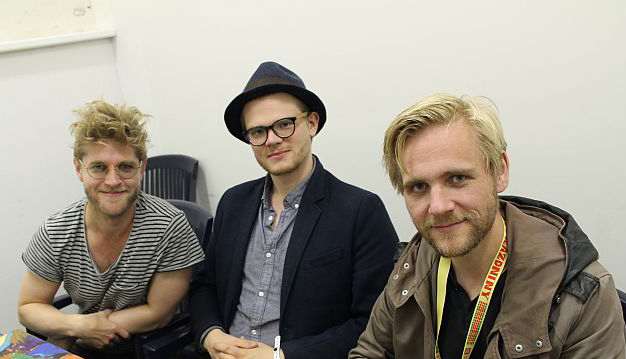
Dreamers' Circus after a concert in Czech Republic

Dreamers' Circus is a Nordic band consisting of Rune Tonsgaard Sørensen (Denmark/Faroe Islands), Ale Carr (Sweden) and Nikolaj Busk (Denmark).

== History ==
Dreamers’ Circus formed in 2009 as a result of a jam session at a folk festival in Copenhagen. Their first performance was at a concert with the Copenhagen Philharmonic, where the trio performed a folk music version of the cadenza in Mozart's 5th violin concerto.

In 2010 Dreamers’ Circus released an EP with five tracks on the Danish label GO’ Folk. The EP was produced by Swedish guitarist Roger Tallroth, of the folk band Väsen. Also featured on the EP is Swedish folk singer Sofia Karlsson.

In 2013 Dreamers’ Circus released their first full album, A Little Symphony on GO’ Folk. The album was produced by August Wanngren and featured both classical string quartet and brass ensemble. A Little Symphony was awarded Album of the Year at the Danish Music Awards Folk 2013, and Dreamers’ Circus was named Talent of the Year at the same event. Ale Carr was also awarded Artist of the Year for his work in Dreamers’ Circus and another Danish band, Basco.

Rune Tonsgaard Sørensen was honoured at the Danish Crown Prince Couple's Awards with the Rising Star Award in 2013. On that occasion, Dreamers’ Circus performed in Sydney Opera House.

In 2015 the band released another album, Second Movement. The album was awarded Album of the Year at the Danish Music Awards Folk 2015, and Ale Carr was also awarded Composer of the Year for his compositions on this recording.

It was also in 2015 that Dreamers’ Circus was invited to perform the music for CARL, a two-hour theatre concert about the life of Danish composer Carl Nielsen. All musical material was arranged for Dreamers’ Circus and string quartet by Nikolaj Busk. CARL was awarded Den Fynske Kulturpris 2016.

In October 2017 Dreamers’ Circus released their third studio album Rooftop Sessions in Denmark on the label GO' Danish Folk. It was licensed to the rest of the world through Vertical Records in June 2018.

Following the critically acclaimed theatre concert CARL, Dreamers’ Circus was invited to compose, arrange and rework the music for Pelle Erobreren (Pelle the Conqueror) on Østre Gasværk Teater in Copenhagen. The show premiered in the fall of 2018.

== Collaborations ==
=== Orchestras ===
The first collaboration with Copenhagen Phil in 2009 led to a full concert with the orchestra in 2011 titled "60 minutes of Dreams". For this concert Dreamers’ Circus’ music was arranged and orchestrated by Swedish conductor and arranger Hans Ek.

In 2017 the group was invited back to do another concert with the orchestra. The program featured a new three movement piece titled A Sense of Place composed and orchestrated by Dreamers’ Circus and Swedish pianist and fiddle player Karl-Johan Ankarblom. Each movement of the piece depicted the local cultures and traditions of Denmark, Faroe Islands and Sweden. The concert was conducted by English conductor Duncan Ward.

Dreamers’ Circus has also collaborated with the Polish orchestra Sinfonia Juventus, Danish Lyngby-Taarbæk Symfoniorkester, Esbjerg Ensemble, Danish Chamber Players, Aalborg Symfoniorkester and Aarhus Symfoniorkester.

=== Danish String Quartet ===
Rune Tonsgaard Sørensen is a member of both the Danish String Quartet (Danish Quartet) and Dreamers’ Circus and the six musicians has been touring together for several festivals in Denmark, Germany and Austria. Danish String Quartet is also featured on both A Little Symphony and Second Movement.

=== Other collaborations ===
Dreamers’ Circus has performed with many other artists of different genres including Oh Land (DK), The Chieftains (IR), Sharon Shannon (IR), Sara Watkins, Aoife O'Donovan and Sarah Jarosz (US), Väsen (SE), Teitur (FO), Shaka Loveless (DK), Kristian Leth (DK), DR Girls Choir (DK) among others.

== Discography ==
- Dreamers' Circus (EP), GO' Folk (19 October 2010)
- A Little Symphony, GO' Folk (3 June 2013)
- Second Movement, GO' Folk (2 April 2015)
- Rooftop Sessions, GO' Folk (23 October 2017) / Vertical Records (1 June 2018)
- Blue White Gold, GO' Folk / Vertical Records (29 May 2020)
- The Lost Swans (EP), GO' Folk / Vertical Records (8 April 2022)
- Langt ud' i Skoven, DR Korskolen / Dacapo Records (27 May 2022)
- Blue White Gold & The Lost Swans (double vinyl), GO' Folk (11 November 2022)
- Yule, Teitur / Arlo & Betty Recordings (6 December 2024)
- Handed On, GO' Folk / Vertical Records (14 February 2025)

== Awards ==
- Danish Music Awards Folk 2013 - Album of the Year for A Little Symphony
- Danish Music Awards Folk 2013 - Talent of the Year
- Danish Music Awards Folk 2015 - Album of the Year for Second Movement
- Danish Music Awards Folk 2015 - Ale Carr, Composer of the Year for Second Movement
- Danish Music Awards Roots 2020 - Ale Carr, Composer of the Year for Blue White Gold
- Danish Music Awards Roots 2020 - Track of the Year for Blue White Gold
- Danish Music Awards Roots 2020 - Album of the Year for Blue White Gold
- Carl Prisen 2021 - Composer of the Year Roots for Blue White Gold
- Årets P2 Kunstner 2023
- Danish Music Awards Roots 2023 - Honorary Award
