= Maia Hirasawa =

Musical artist

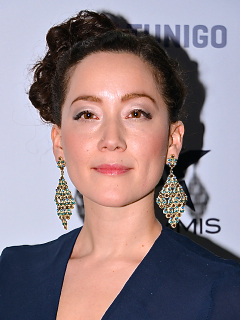
- Maia Hirasawa

Background information
- Born: 5 May 1980 (age 45); Sollentuna, Sweden
- Occupation: Singer-songwriter
- Years active: 2005–present
- Labels: Razzia Records; Thrive Records; Victor Entertainment

Maia Hirasawa (born 5 May 1980) is a Swedish singer-songwriter.

She was born and raised in Sollentuna, Stockholm, Sweden but has lived for many years in Gothenburg. Maia became known through Annika Norlin's band Hello Saferide, where she is a back-up singer. Her solo career began in early 2007 when the song "And I Found This Boy" started being played heavily on Swedish radio. The single was followed up by the album "Though, I'm Just Me" and the single "Gothenburg". During the summer of 2007 she toured around Sweden, playing at such shows as Allsång på Skansen, Hultsfredsfestivalen, Peace & Love and Arvika Festival. In 2010 she for the first time released material in Swedish with the EP "Dröm bort mig igen".

== Discography ==
=== Albums ===
Year	Album Information	Peak chart positions	
Year	Album Information	SWE	JPN
2007	Though, I'm Just Me: Released: 12 April 2007; Language: English; Formats: CD, digital download	9	—
2009	"GBG vs STHLM": Released: 3 April 2009; Language: English; Formats: CD, digital download	12	—
2011	Maia Hirasawa: Released: 19 January 2011; Language: English, Japanese, Swedish; Formats: CD, digital download	—	37
2012	We Got It: Released: 25 January 2012; Language: English; Formats: CD, digital download	—	100
2012	What I Saw: Released: April 2013; Language: English; Formats: CD, digital download	—	9

=== Extended plays ===
- 2006 – The My New Friend EP
- 2010 – Dröm bort mig igen
- 2011 – Boom!

=== Singles ===
Release	Title	Notes	Chart positions		Album
Release	Title	Notes	SWE	JPN	Album
2007	"Mattis & Maia"		—	—	Though, I'm Just Me
2007	"And I Found This Boy"		56	—	Though, I'm Just Me
2007	"Gothenburg"		—	—	Though, I'm Just Me
2008	"The Worrying Kind"	The Ark cover	9	—	Though, I'm Just Me
2009	"South Again"		—	—	"GBG vs STHLM"
2010	"Come with Me" feat. Nicolai Dunger		—	—	"GBG vs STHLM"
2010	"It Doesn't Stop"	Used in Kao essential damage shampoo TV commercials	—	4	Maia Hirasawa
2011	"Boom!"	Used in JR Kyushu Shinkansen TV commercials	—	6	Boom! (extended play)
2011	"We Got It"		—	24	We Got It
2011	"The Real Me Song"		—	—	We Got It
2011	"The Gift"		—	39	We Got It
2012	"The Best Team"	Used in Kao essential damage shampoo TV commercials	—	18	We Got It

=== Songs as featured artist ===
Release	Title	Notes	Chart positions		Album
Release	Title	Notes	Oricon (JPN)	Japan Hot 100 (JPN)	Album
2010	"Nerumare (After Long Tomorrow)" (Toe feat. Maia Hirasawa)	Used in Pocari Sweat TV commercials	—	—	—
2011	"Bang Bang" (Pizzicato One feat. Maia Hirasawa)	Cher cover	—	—	One and Ten Very Sad Songs
2011	"Apathy" (Jazztronik feat. Maia Hirasawa)		—	—	Dig Dig Dig
2011	"Movin'" (Soil & "Pimp" Sessions feat. Maia Hirasawa)		31	31	Magnetic Soil
2011	"Waltz for Debby" (Sweet Swing feat. Maia Hirasawa)	Jazz standard	—	—	Sweet Swing for Hershey's
