= Roger Tallroth =

Roger Tallroth may refer to:

- Roger Tallroth (musician) (born 1958), singer
- Roger Tallroth (wrestler), wrestler and Olympic silver medalist
