= Felefeber =

Live album by Annbjørg Lien
- Released: 1994
- Recorded: Gjerpen Church near Skien
- Genre: Traditional folk music
- Length: 53:22
- Label: Grappa Music
- Producer: Annbjørg Lien & Roger Tallroth

Annbjørg Lien chronology
Annbjørg (1989)	Felefeber (1994)	Prisme (1996)

Felefeber – Norwegian Fiddle Fantasia (released 1994 by the Norwegian Grappa label – GRCD 4081) is a studio album by Annbjørg Lien. The album was recorded in Gjerpen Church near Skien, a stone church from the 12th century. Only the sounds of the fiddle, guitar and church organ were recorded.

== Track listing ==
1. «Tjønneblomen» / «The Water Lily» (3:32)
  (Gjermund Haugen)
2. «Halling Etter Mosafinn» / «Halling After Ola Mosafinn» (2:41)
  (Traditional)
3. «Springar Etter Kristiane Lund» / «Springar After Kristiane Lund» (3:36)
  (Traditional)
4. «Felefeber» / «Fiddle Fever/Fiddlemania» (5:11)
  (Annbjørg Lien)
5. «Droneslaget» / «The Battle of the Drones» (4:12)
  (Annbjørg Lien)
6. «Den Bortkomne Sauen» / «The Lost Sheep» (3:19)
  (Traditional)
7. «Knepphallingen» / «The Plucked Halling» (4:11)
  (Jon Rosenlind)
8. «Elgskyttaren» / «The Moose Hunter» (3:06)
  (Traditional)
9. «Et Lite Barn» / «A Little Child» (5:48)
  (Traditional)
10. «Dragos» (4:15)
  (Roger Tallroth)
11. «Nordfjordhallingen» / «The Nordfjord Halling» (3:47)
  (Traditional)
12. «Hildalen» / «The Hildale Man» (3:23)
  (Traditional)
13. «Amen» (3:35)
  (Traditional/Nils Brorson)
14. «Myllargutens Bruremarsj» / «The Miller Boy's Bridal March» (2:46)
  (Torgeir Audgundson)

== Personnel ==
- Annbjørg Lien – Hardingfele
- Iver Kleive – pipe organ
- Steinar Ofsdal – flute
- Roger Tallroth – bass balalaika, guitar & octave mandolin

== Credits ==
- Arranger - Iver Kleive
- Producer & arranger – Annbjørg Lien
- Producer, arranger & programming – Roger Tallroth
- Digital mastering - Robert Vosgien
