= Bilal Göregen =

Turkish street musician and drummer

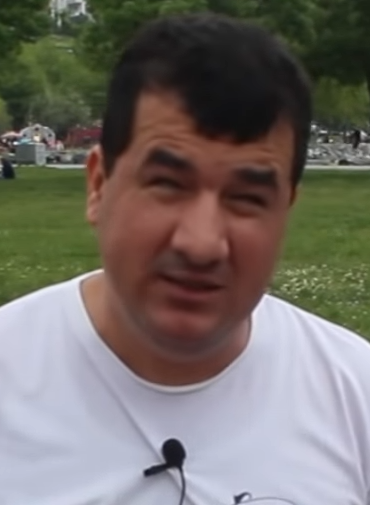
- Göregen in 2019
- Born: 4 September 1988 (age 37); Dörtyol, Hatay Province, Turkey
- Occupation: Street musician
- Years active: 2008–present
- Musical career
- Instrument: Goblet drum/ Darbuka/ Doumbek

Bilal Göregen (born 4 September 1988) is a Turkish street musician and drummer. He is blind and has become famous via his rendition of Ievan polkka, wherein a Twitter user superimposed a cat bobbing its head on his video. YouTube has shared his performing video on Instagram.

== Life and career ==
Born and raised in Hatay, Turkey. Bilal Göregen has performed in O Ses Türkiye. He earned fame by Sevdiğim kız bana abi deyince. He had a video with the mayor of Istanbul Ekrem İmamoğlu. He is from Bitlis.
