= Hållbus Totte Mattson =

Swedish musician

- Born: Dalarna, Sweden
- Origin: Sweden
- Genres: Nordic folk
- Occupation(s): Multi-instrumentalist, folk musician
- Instrument(s): Lute, baroque lute, mandora, bass mandora, hummel, classical guitar, baroque guitar, Mora-oud, accordion, Swedish dulcimer, and hurdy-gurdy
- Years active: 1980–present

Hållbus Totte Mattson (usually known simply as Totte Mattson) is a multi-instrumentalist folk musician from Dalarna, Sweden. Mattson's instruments include the lute, baroque lute, mandora, bass mandora, hummel, classical guitar, baroque guitar Mora-oud, accordion, Swedish dulcimer, hurdy-gurdy and vocals.

Mattson was a founding member in 1980 of the seminal Swedish folk ensemble Groupa along with Mats Edén. In 1987, Mattson, Anders Stake (now Anders Norudde) and percussionist Björn Tollin formed the band Hedningarna in order to explore the possibilities of developing a new musical style based on elements of traditional music. The group wrote and played a major part of the music to theatre project Den stora vreden (rough translation: The Great Wrath) at Gävleborgs folkteater (the county theatre of Gävleborg), first time performed in 1988, that attracted much attention. A fairly large portion of the music on their first record was originally performed in that play.

Mattson has also participated in the Swedish musical and dance ensemble Boot with Ola Bäckström (viola d'amore, bouzouki) and Björn Tollin (percussion).

In 1999, Mattson and Stefan Brisland-Ferner of Garmarna began collaborating on a musical project that would involve a novel use of hurdy-gurdies, which would expand on the idea that the hurdy-gurdy was the medieval equivalent of a synthesizer. In 2005, they released their first album under the name Hurdy-Gurdy, titled Prototyp. The album consists of twelve traditional and original songs, played entirely on two Swedish hurdy-gurdies by Brisland-Ferner and Mattson. Specialized recording and computer editing techniques were used to produce a number of unique musical effects.

== Groups ==
- Groupa
- Hedningarna
- Boot

== Discography ==
- Av Bara Farten (with Groupa), 1982
- Vildhonung (with Groupa), 1985
- Utan Sans (with Groupa), 1989
- Hedningarna (with Hedningarna), 1989
- Månskratt (with Groupa and Lena Willemark), 1990
- Kaksi (with Hedningarna), 1991
- Trä (with Hedningarna), 1994
- Kruspolska: SASHA mixes, 1994
- Hippjokk (with Hedningarna), 1997
- Karelia Visa (with Hedningarna), 1999
- Virvla (with Boot), 1999
- 1989-2003 (with Hedningarna), 2003
- Prototyp (Hurdy-Gurdy, with Stefan Brisland-Ferner), 2005
- Soot (with Boot), 2010
