= 6 (Garmarna album) =

2016 studio album by Garmarna

Studio album by Garmarna
- Released: 4 April 2016
- Genre: Folk rock, Folktronica
- Label: Westpark, BMG

Garmarna chronology
Hildegard von Bingen (2001)	6 (2016)	Förbundet (2020)

6 is the sixth studio album by the Swedish folk rock band Garmarna. Released in 2016, it was the band's first album after a hiatus of 15 years. Unlike its predecessors, 6 is more electronic and focuses on current issues like refugees, borders, hate and prejudices. It also includes tracks written and recorded in cooperation with other Swedish artists, namely Maxida Märak, Thåström and Annika Norlin.

== Reception ==
Professional ratings
Review scores
Source	Rating
Gaffa	3/6 stars

The album received mixed international reviews. While the Sonic Seducer from Germany published a highly positive review praising the band's energy and musical diversity, reviewers from Garmana's home country Sweden were more reluctant. Gaffa wrote that Garmarna's new sound was more reminiscent of the Melodifestivalen than of folktronica, but also pointed at "precious melodies" among the otherwise "uncreative arrangements". However, the reviewer for the Lira magazine noted that 6 was essentially Garmarna's first album that consists mostly of self-written works – if containing less folk elements than previous releases, and that Garmana's habit of creating something new had been continued. These reviews agreed also, that the only constant factor throughout the musical development of Garmarna had been the exceptional vocal quality of singer Emma Härdelin.

== Track listing ==
No.	Title	Writer(s)	Length
1.	"Över gränsan (Over the Border)" (feat. Maxida Märak)	Stefan Brisland-Ferner, Emma Härdelin, Maxida Märak	3:28
2.	"Väktaren (The Guardian)"	Brisland-Ferner, Härdelin, Sanken Sandqvist	3:42
3.	"Öppet hav (Open Sea)" (feat. Thåström)	Brisland-Ferner, Jens Höglin	4:51
4.	"Nåden (The Mercy)"	Brisland-Ferner, Härdelin	4:39
5.	"Timmarna (The Hours)"	Brisland-Ferner, Härdelin, trad.	3:51
6.	"Ingen (Nobody)"	Brisland-Ferner, Härdelin, Annika Norlin	3:29
7.	"Ett dolt begär (A Hidden Desire)"	Brisland-Ferner, Härdelin, trad.	4:35
8.	"Fönsterspöken (Window Ghosts)"	Brisland-Ferner	4:03
9.	"Labyrint (Labyrinth)"	Brisland-Ferner, Norlin	3:46
10.	"Gränser vi glömt (Borders We've Forgotten)"	Brisland-Ferner, Härdelin	3:43
