= Annika Norlin =

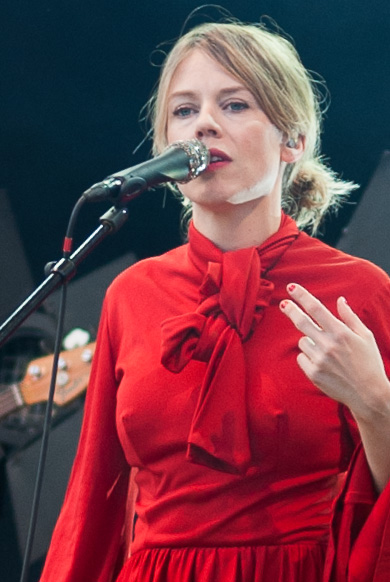
- Norlin performing at Gröna Lund in Stockholm, Sweden, in 2011

Background information
- Born: 22 November 1977 (age 48); Östersund, Sweden
- Genre: indie pop
- Occupations: Journalist, singer, songwriter
- Instrument: Guitar
- Years active: 1999–present

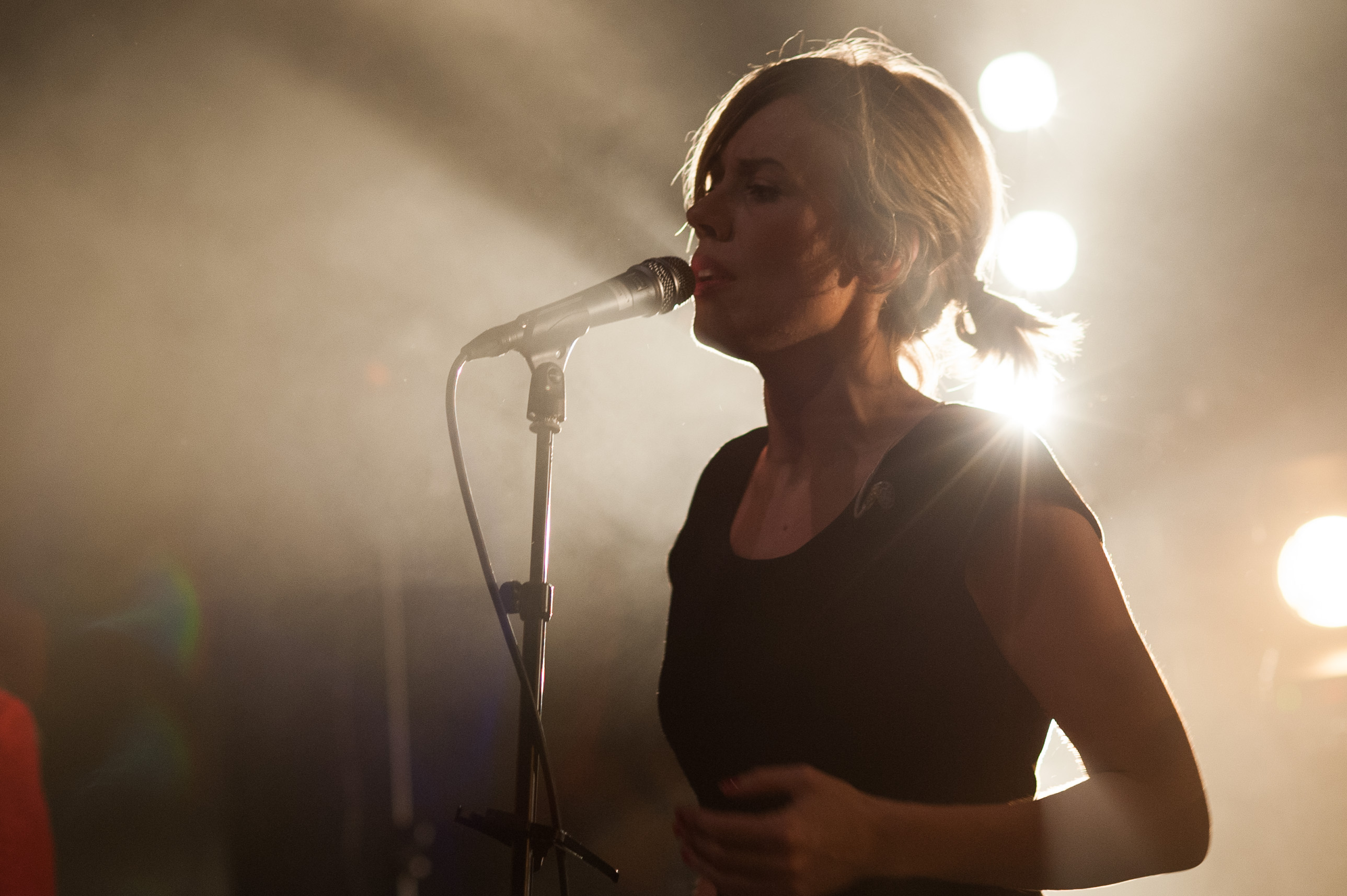
Norlin performing at Mosebacke in Stockholm, Sweden, in 2012

Annika Norlin (born 22 November 1977) is a Swedish musician, journalist and author who makes music under the names Hello Saferide (in English) and Säkert! (in Swedish).

She released her first book, Texter (Lyrics), in 2014, which was a collection of her lyrics – both Swedish and English – for every song she had released so far, and to a few previously unreleased songs.

She released her second book, Jag ser allt du gör (I see everything you do), in 2020. The book is a collection of eight short stories written by Norlin. It was shortlisted for the 2021 Borås Tidnings debutantpris.

Her first novel, Stacken was published in 2023 in Sweden and released in a Europa Edition as The Colony in the United States in 2025. It was a bestseller in Sweden and won the Vi Literature Award and Swedish Radio's Novel Prize.

== Discography ==
=== Hello Saferide ===
Albums

- 2005 – Introducing...Hello Saferide
- 2006 – Introducing...Hello Saferide – vinyl with The Quiz as a bonus track
- 2008 – More Modern Short Stories from Hello Saferide
- 2014 – The Hunter, the Fox and Hello Saferide

EP

- 2006 – Long Lost Penpal EP
- 2006 – Would You Let Me Play This EP 10 Times A Day?

CDs

- 2005 – My Best Friend
- 2005 – If I Don't Write This Song Someone I Love Will Die
- 2007 – I Was Definitely Made for These Times / The Quiz
- 2008 – Anna
- 2009 – Arjeplog

Part of collection

- 2004 – Jeans & Summer 2, track 5, Highschool Stalker
- 2006 – Oh No It's Christmas Vol. 1, track 2 iPod X-mas
- 2008 – There's A Razzia Going On, track 1, I Was Definitely Made for These Times
- 2009 – There's A Razzia Going On vol. 2, track 1, I Fold

=== Säkert! ===
Albums

- 2007 – Säkert!
- 2010 – Facit
- 2011 – På engelska
- 2017 – Däggdjur

EPs

- 2017 – Inte jag heller
- 2018 – Arktiska oceanen

CDs

- 2007 – Vi kommer att dö samtidigt
- 2007 – Allt som är ditt
- 2008 – Det kommer bara leda till nåt
- 2010 – Fredrik
- 2010 – Dansa, fastän

Part of collection

- 2007 – Poem, ballader och lite blues/Återbesöket, spår 2 Generalens visa
- 2008 – There's a Razzia Going On, vol 1, spår 8 3 månader sen idag
- 2009 – Retur Waxholm, spår 3 Jag vill inte suddas ut
- 2009 – There's a Razzia Going On, vol 2, spår 10 Min hemstad

=== Annika Norlin ===
- 2022 – Mentor

=== Other collaborations ===
- 2006 – Färjemansleden (with Annika Norlin), "Vapnet", from their album Jag vet hur man väntar
- 2016 – Garmarna (with Annika Norlin), "Ingen" from the album 6
- 2019 – Correspondence, collaboration with Jens Lekman
- 2024 – Tid att riva sönder, collaboration with Jonas Teglund

== Bibliography ==
- Texter (Lyrics), Teg Publishing, Luleå 2014, ISBN 978-91-979115-8-0.
- Jag ser allt du gör (I see everything you do), Weyler förlag, Stockholm 2020, ISBN 978-91-27-16735-3.
- Stacken (The Colony), Weyler förlag, Stockholm 2023, Europa Editions March 2025 in USA ISBN 979-8-88966-082-8.
