= Fire (Hedningarna album) =

Album by Hedningarna

Studio album by Hedningarna
- Released: 1996
- Label: Silence Records

Hedningarna chronology
Kruspolska	Fire	Hippjokk

Fire (stylized "fiRe") is the fifth album released by Swedish group Hedningarna, translated to "The Heathens" for the international market. It is a compilation album put together to introduce the group outside Sweden, containing tracks from the albums Kaksi! and Trä.

== Track listing ==
No.	Title	Length
1.	"Aivoton (Brainless)"	3:37
2.	"Tina vieri (Tinkling Roll the Tinbits)"	4:59
3.	"Gorrlaus (The Steed)"	5:06
4.	"Omas Ludvig"	3:00
5.	"Vargtimmen (The Hour of the Wolf)"	4:18
6.	"Juopolle joutunut (Gone to Sot)"	3:30
7.	"Min skog (My Trees Shall Stand)"	4:06
8.	"Kruspolska (Charmer's Polska)"	3:18
9.	"Viktorin"	2:38
10.	"Tuuli (Wind Raising)"	5:12
11.	"Chicago"	2:57
12.	"Grodan / Widergrenen (Toadeater)"	4:52
13.	"Räven (Foxwoman)"	4:51
