= Hello Saferide =

Swedish band

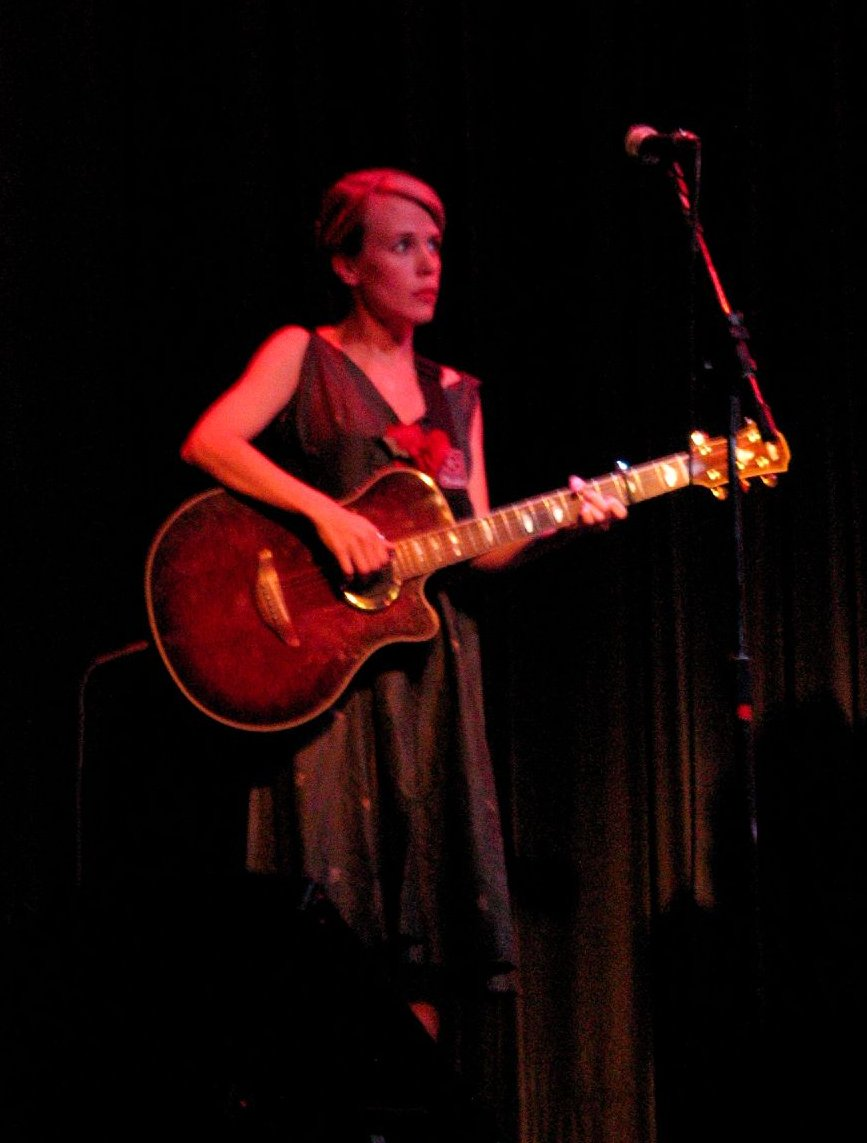
- Hello Saferide in September 2007

Background information
- Origin: Stockholm, Sweden
- Genres: Twee pop, indie pop
- Years active: 2005 – present
- Labels: Razzia Records
- Members: Annika Norlin; Andreas Söderlund; Maia Hirasawa; Fredrik Hultgren; Jens Lagergren
- Website: hellosaferide.com

Hello Saferide is a Swedish twee pop band fronted by songwriter Annika Norlin. According to Norlin's MySpace, the stage name "Hello Saferide" was "inspired by an intelligent bus driver in a drug-addicted small town, don't ask." The Swedish-language version of the band's biography identifies the town as Willimantic, Connecticut.

Based on the Internet success of the song "Highschool Stalker," Hello Saferide was signed to Razzia Records in 2005.

In 2007, Norlin released a Swedish-language album under the band name Säkert! (a phrase that means "Yeah, right!", but also "Safe"). The album won her two Grammis awards in 2008, for best female pop act and best lyrics. She was chosen by Matt Groening to perform at the edition of the All Tomorrow's Parties festival he was curating in May 2010 in Minehead, England.

Annika Norlin is a journalist, and has worked for several newspapers in Sweden. She has also hosted different radio shows at Sveriges Radio P3.

== Discography ==
=== Albums ===
as Hello Saferide

Year	Album	Peak positions	Certification
Year	Album	SWE	Certification
2005	Introducing...Hello Saferide	39	
2008	More Modern Short Stories from Hello Saferide	3	
2014	The Fox, The Hunter and Hello Saferide	4	

as Säkert!

Year	Album	Peak positions	Certification
Year	Album	SWE	Certification
2007	Säkert!	8	
2010	Facit	2	
2011	Säkert! på engelska	13	
2017	Däggdjur	2	

=== EP/Singles ===
as Hello Saferide

Year	Album	Peak positions
Year	Album	SWE
2005	"If I Don't Write This Song Someone I Love Will Die"	–
2005	"My Best Friend"	–
2006	Long Lost Penpal EP	44
2006	Would You Let Me Play This EP 10 Times a Day?	4
2008	Anna	43

as Säkert!

Year	Album	Peak positions
Year	Album	SWE
2007	"Allt som är ditt"	–
2008	"Vi kommer att dö samtidigt"	53
2010	"Fredrik"	53

Featured in

Year	Album	Peak positions
Year	Album	SWE
2007	"Logiskt" (Petter feat. Säkert!)	10
