= The Colony (novel) =

2025 novel by Annika Norlin

- 2025 Book jacket
- Author: Annika Norlin
- Translator: Alice E. Olsson
- Subject: Alienation, Communal living in fiction
- Genre: Psychological fiction
- Set in: Norrland, Sweden
- Publisher: Weyler Förlag, Europa Editions
- Publication date: 2023
- Publication place: Sweden, United Kingdom, United States
- English publication date: March 25, 2025
- Media type: Print, E-book
- Pages: 399
- Awards: Vi magazine's 2024 literature prize
- ISBN: 979-8889660828
- OCLC: 1439565580

The Colony is a Swedish novel written by Swedish pop star, Annika Norlin, and translated into English by Alice E. Olsson, The English version was published by Europa Editions in March 2025. The book was a bestseller in Sweden and is being adapted for television.

== Plot ==
The protagonist, Emelie, is burned out on her job and her life to the extent that she tosses her iPhone into a lake and seeks solace in the northern Swedish countryside and forest. There she encounters a group of seven people who have adopted the commune lifestyle during the previous fifteen years. There are three men, three women and a teenage boy. Yet, to Emelie, the group starts out as a mystery because each member of the group seems to maintain their individuality but live together in a wilderness communal setting.

Also when Emelie shows up, there is the question of whether, after fifteen years, the group can withstand the presence of an outsider. In his review for The Los Angeles Times, Charles Arrowsmith says that one of the colony's members, "Sagne, who was an entomologist before retiring to the woods," makes a superficial comparison of the group with an ant colony. Here, the fictional character Sagne says, "[e]veryone has a task for the community... Everyone is needed. No one has to know everything."

== Themes ==
Joumana Khatib writing for The New York Times says that "the story’s open-ended questions — about the power of charisma and love and the boundaries between the individual and the greater good — arise organically, without forcing stale answers." And, according to The New Yorker magazine, another theme that emerges is "an extraordinary story about trying to find your place in modern society."

== Parallels ==
Charles Arrowsmith, writing for the Los Angeles Times demonstrates parallels and connections between The Colony and other works.

According to Arrowsmith, intense fatigue, or burnout, such as what happened to Emelie, is not new. Such a condition had been expressed years before by another well known author, Henry David Thoreau. He didn't have an iPhone to throw into a lake, but he did choose to leave the status quo and the mundane behind, and live in the woods for two years, very close to Concord, Massachusetts.

Arrowsmith also says that back in 1854, Thoreau saw how small details could overwhelm people. Thoreau additionally lamented how people craved hearing the latest news, similar to our modern day iPhone habits. Thoreau’s well known remedy was: “Simplify, simplify.”

Arrowsmith furthermore says that the easy appeal of The Colony is recognizable to American audiences. After all, "[t]he search for meaning, authenticity and adventure in the wilderness is a Great American trope." This is seen not only in Thoreau, but also Melville's Ishmael, who came to a similar conclusion that conventional life amongst society was too much. So he sought an abrupt change in lifestyle and scenery. Similar examples are Chris McCandless in "Into the Wild," and the author Cheryl Strayed. Arrowsmith says that "[t]hese works typically offer sociopolitical commentary along with the fishing and sleeping bags — and “The Colony” is no different."

== Reception ==
Khatib of The New York Times says that the author's "observations are intercut with chapters focusing on each of the Colony’s members, in the past and present. Norlin is in full command of her characters’ histories and marshals a tremendous level of detail.

The New Yorker says that the author, Norlin, "has a wonderfully unpredictable way of writing. It’s both journalistic and poetic, and she moves back and forth between the registers in a way that few writers can. She leans toward the reportorial, but there are beautiful sentences hidden throughout, and when you find one it just knocks you over."

== About the book ==
This book was originally published in Sweden in 2023 by Weyler Förlag under the title Stacken, which translates to Ant Hill in English. Stacken won the Vi magazine's 2024 literature prize. Before writing the book, Norlin herself went through a period of exhaustion. After this she developed a strong desire to be in the forest. Black ants became a source of inspiration for this book after they invaded her home. In this interview Norlin also discusses "group dynamics, anxiety, alpha females" and the desire to write.
