= Fiddle-singing =

Style of music

Fiddle-singing is a vocal–instrumental performance practice in which a musician sings while simultaneously playing the fiddle (violin), often maintaining rhythmic bowing patterns or melodic counterpoint beneath the vocal line. The technique is found in multiple traditional music cultures, including Métis, Québécois, Appalachian, Scandinavian, and Celtic traditions. It is particularly associated with dance music repertoires in which the fiddle serves both melodic and rhythmic functions.

Fiddle-singing differs from simple accompaniment in that the fiddle part frequently retains structural independence from the vocal melody, sometimes sustaining ostinato figures, drone textures, or interlocking rhythmic bow strokes while the performer sings.

According to Gabriella Medina in the Garnette Report, "Fiddle singing is an extremely difficult technique seen most in old-time folk music. While singing and playing the guitar or the piano together is common and doable, doing so with a fiddle takes an extreme amount of skill. Not only must the player navigate the coordination of playing the notes and singing the melodies, but they must do so with the fiddle quite literally jammed into their throat. The position of the chin on the violin also distorts the face which affects the singing."

== History and cultural context ==
Long before the modern violin became standard in European folk traditions, a wide range of bowed string instruments were played in ways that naturally supported simultaneous singing. Many early bowed instruments—predating the viol and the rebec—were held vertically rather than under the chin, often resting on the chest or knee. Examples of such instruments include the Cretan lyra, the Gadulka of Bulgaria, the Erhu of China, and the Rebab found across North Africa and the Middle East.

=== North American traditions ===
Fiddle-singing is incorporated into the musical practices of the Métis, Cree, Dene, and Anishinaabe nations. For example, according to Lawrence Barkwell, Métis fiddle-singers often sing while maintaining rhythmic fiddle patterns, often associated with dance or social gatherings, creating a layered texture in which the fiddle functions simultaneously as melodic support and rhythmic drive.

In French Canadian traditions, particularly in Québec, fiddle-singing is linked to oral song traditions and dance music practices dating to the 18th and 19th centuries. Ethnomusicologist Luc Lacourcière documented the integration of song and fiddle playing within rural Québécois communities, where musicians often alternated between instrumental reels and sung chansons à répondre.

In Appalachian music, performers such as traditional ballad singers sometimes accompanied themselves lightly on fiddle, though the practice was less common than banjo or guitar self-accompaniment. Scholar Jeff Todd Titon notes that instrumental–vocal hybridity in Appalachian traditions often reflected functional needs in community dance settings.

=== Celtic traditions ===
In Irish and Scottish traditions, fiddle playing has historically been more strictly separated from singing; however, archival recordings reveal instances of singers maintaining drone bowing or rhythmic figures while performing narrative ballads.

=== Scandinavian traditions ===
In certain Norwegian and Swedish folk practices, particularly those involving the hardingfele (Hardanger fiddle), performers have been documented singing while sustaining sympathetic string resonance, creating layered sonic textures.

== Musical characteristics ==
Fiddle-singing often involves one or more of the following techniques:

- Drone bowing: Sustained open-string tones supporting modal vocal melodies.
- Rhythmic ostinato: Repeated bow patterns maintaining dance pulse.
- Call-and-response structures: Alternation between instrumental phrases and sung refrains.
- Modal interplay: Use of Dorian, Mixolydian, or pentatonic modes common in traditional repertoires.

Because the fiddle requires continuous bow motion for sustained sound, coordinating vocal phrasing with bow direction and string crossings presents technical challenges distinct from guitar-based self-accompaniment.

== Contemporary revival and innovation ==
Since the late 20th-century folk revival movements in Canada, the United States, and Northern Europe, scholars have noted renewed exploration of integrated instrumental–vocal traditions that blur distinctions between instrumentalist and singer roles.

In contemporary folk and experimental traditions, some fiddle-singers incorporate live looping technology to expand the textural possibilities of simultaneous singing and violin performance. Looping pedals allow performers to record short instrumental phrases in real time and layer them beneath vocal lines, creating polyphonic or rhythmically complex accompaniments otherwise impossible for a single musician. Fiddle-Singer Andrew Bird has documented the use of multiple delay and looping pedals to build rhythmic pizzicato patterns and sustained bowed textures beneath his vocals in both recordings and live performance. American roots musician Rhiannon Giddens has incorporated layered bowed fiddle textures beneath vocal performance in contemporary reinterpretations of traditional repertoire. Canadian fiddle-singer Aleksi Campagne incorporates live looping in his fiddle-singing performances in an indie-folk context. Scholars of music revival movements note that such technological adaptations reflect broader trends in late twentieth- and early twenty-first-century folk performance, in which traditional techniques are recontextualized through modern amplification and effects processing.

== Examples of fiddle-singers ==
- La Bolduc (Mary Travers)
- Jean Carignan
- Tommy Jarrell
- Bruce Molsky
- Nancy Kerr
- Knut Buen
- Rhiannon Giddens
- Jon Boden
- Alison Krauss
- John Arcand
- Andrew Bird
- Aleksi Campagne
- Mark O'Connor
- Charlie Daniels
- Carole Pegg
- Eliza Carthy
- Hanni Autere
- Helen Bell
- Chesley Goseyun Wilson
- Nelu Ploieșteanu
- Pete Cooper
- Seth Lakeman
- Roger Wilson
- Aly Bain
- Frankie Gavin
- Kevin Burke
- Dennis McGee
- Tommy Jarrell
- Richard Greene
- Darol Anger
- Casey Driessen
- Kate Young
