= Daniel Sandén-Warg =

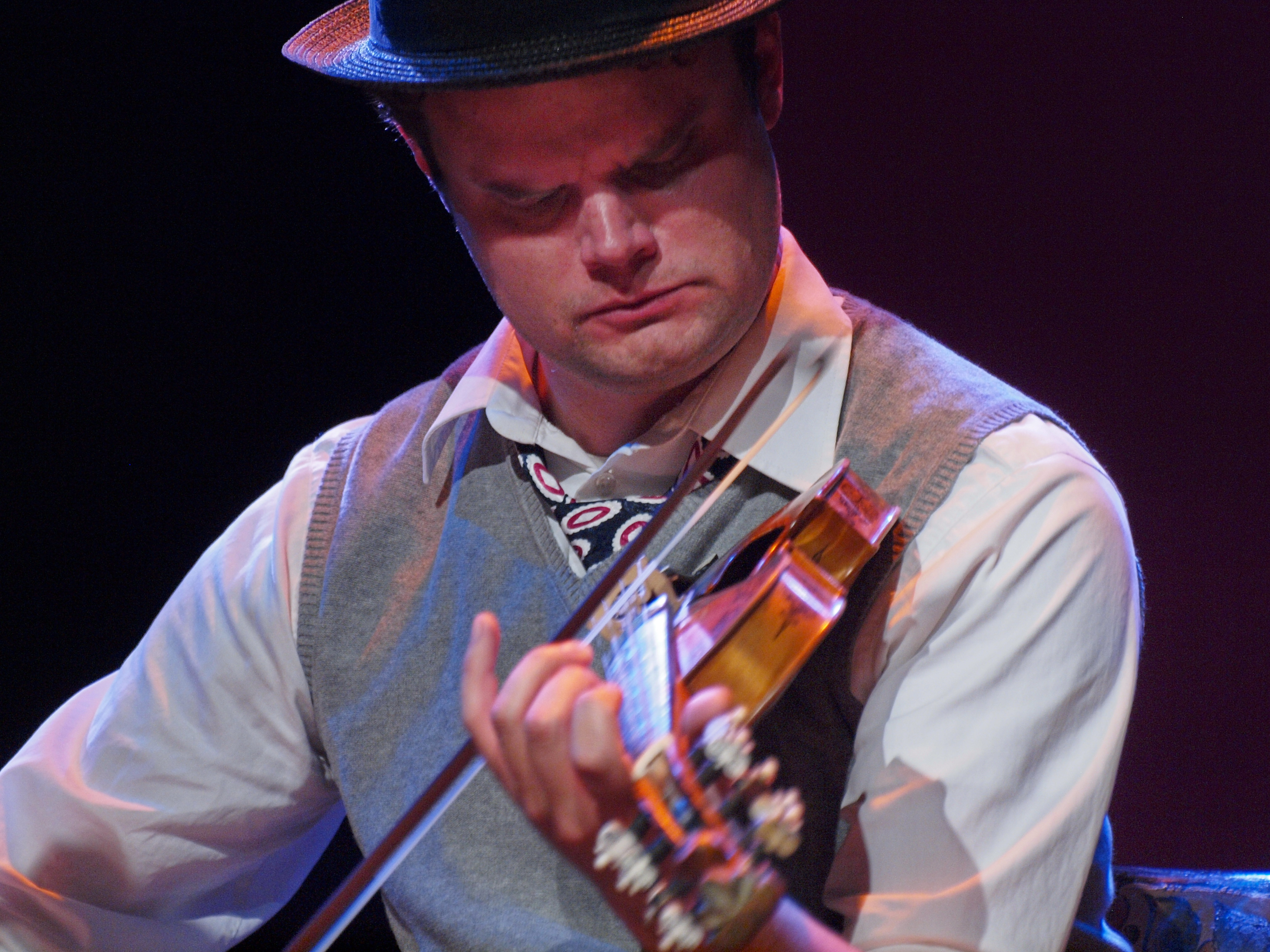

Background information
- Born: 1977 (age 47–48); Östersund, Sweden

Daniel Sandén-Warg (born 1977 in Östersund) is a Swedish Hardanger fiddler and silversmith from Karlstad. He also plays Jew's harp, key harp, guitar and regular fiddle. He moved to Setesdal to be closer to the folk music scene there. In Setesdal, Hallvard T. Bjørgum was one of his teachers in both music and silversmithing.

He is a member of the folk music group Harv, which he founded with Magnus Stinnerbom; and a member of the music collective Knut Heddis Minne. He has worked together with the Hardanger fiddler Per Anders Buen Garnås and in 2008, they released the album Warg Buen on ta:lik.

Together with the Jew's harp player Sigurd Brokke, he released the albums Rammeslag (2007) and Rammeslag II (2009) on Etnisk musikklubb. Both won the Folkelarmprisen in the solo class. For Rammeslag II, they were also nominated for the Spellemannprisen 2009 in the folk music/traditional dance class.

Sandén-Warg has also played in the backing band to Odd Nordstoga and on releases by Aasmund Nordstoga, Veronica Akselsen, Gåte and Hanne Hukkelberg.

He has received an artist's stipend from the state to drive folk music.

== Discography ==
- Rammeslag (Etnisk musikklubb, 2007) with Sigurd Brokke
- Warg Buen (ta:lik, 2008) with Per Anders Buen Garnås
- Rammeslag II (Etnisk musikklubb, 2009) with Sigurd Brokke
