= Loituma Girl =

Internet meme

The "Loituma Girl" Orihime Inoue twirling her leek in the Flash animation.

Loituma Girl (also known as "Leekspin") is a Flash animation set to a scat singing section of the Finnish song "Ievan polkka," sung by the Finnish quartet Loituma on their 1995 debut album Things of Beauty. It appeared on the Internet in late April 2006 and quickly became popular. The animation consists of four frames showing the Bleach anime character Orihime Inoue twirling a leek, set to a 27-second loop from the song.

== Content ==
The animation of Loituma Girl is taken from episode two of the Bleach anime series, between the twelfth and fourteenth minute (depending on the version). In the clip, Orihime Inoue is twirling a Japanese bunching onion while talking to Ichigo Kurosaki and Rukia Kuchiki. The scene is an instance of a recurring joke surrounding her character, in which she wants to cook something so unusual that it seems almost inedible.

The music used consists of the second half of the fifth stanza (four lines) and the complete sixth stanza (eight lines) from "Ievan polkka". Unlike the rest of the song, these two stanzas have no meaning, consisting mostly of phonetically inspired Finnish words that vary from performance to performance and are usually made up on the spot by the singer (compare scat singing in jazz). These stanzas are therefore not generally listed on lyrics pages, causing confusion for people looking for lyrics that match the animation.

== Popularity ==
On 10 July 2006, the Finnish newspaper Helsingin Sanomat reported that Loituma Girl had caused a resurgence in Loituma's popularity, and the band had received thousands of fan letters from around the world.

Band member Timo Väänänen describes his initial reaction to the video:

I first found out there was something going on when I looked at the statistics of my own web page and then I realized that something weird is happening because there is such a huge traffic there. And most of the traffic came from Russia and then I started to track down what is happening and then I found this video. And well, I have no idea what this video is about, and what this girl is about.

The meme's author is widely believed to be the Russian Livejournal user "g_r_e_e_n", having posted a link to the meme on his LiveJournal feed on 23 April 2006 at 15:40. However, mentions of the meme online go as far back as April 20 of the same year. The song clip soon enjoyed overwhelming popularity in Russia as a ringtone.

PRI's The World radio program covered the animation in a segment, in which they noted the clip's trance-inducing qualities. Patrick Macias, who was interviewed in the program, described the animation:

This is basically a joke for someone who spends all of their time staring at a computer, made by people who spend all of their time staring at a computer. It's possible to read deeper meanings into it, but it sort of defeats the purpose because in the end it's just this hypnotic clip of animation.

As with most Internet memes, numerous videos, remixes, and parodies have been inspired by the Flash animation. These may feature the animated background, the song clip, or otherwise reference the style of the animation.

In August 2010, the Disney Channel aired "Summer Belongs To You!", a one-hour television special for Phineas and Ferb. During the segment of the special where the cast visits Tokyo, they participate in a dance to a song similar to "Caramelldansen", alongside Stacy's family. During the dance, Isabella can be spotted waving a leek in her hand, a direct reference to the Loituma Girl.

In December 2010, Operation Leakspin played off the "Leekspin" meme during efforts to raise awareness of potentially important documents leaked by WikiLeaks.

== Commercialization ==
In August 2006, German ringtone provider Jamba! began selling a collection of media based on the animation. The video shows an anthropomorphic donkey (called Holly Dolly) dancing to the animation which is displayed (flipped horizontally) in the background. The animation is marketed as the "Dolly Song", and the music is played faster than the original Loituma version. It was also given an extra 30-second drum preface.

In January 2007, a similar video entitled "Holly Dolly – Dolly Song (Ieva's Polka)" appeared in the Google Video Top 100, though it had already been present on the Internet for some time. It features the same donkey, along with some dancing sheep and a snowman, but the leek-spinning girl in the background is only there briefly. In April 2007, a Dutch power company (Eneco) used the melody of Loituma's Ievan Polkka in its TV commercial for "ecostroom" (green energy).

The Dutch company Artiq Mobile launched a website where people can upload homemade Loituma Girl spoof videos. TV commercials state the best video will win 500 euros. The Romanian company Romtelecom uses the song in one of their commercials for Dolce, a satellite television service.

In October 2007, McDonald's used this song in a Hungarian TV spot for their McCafé coffee. Typing "Loituma Girl" in the 2009 DS game Scribblenauts results in a red-haired girl spinning a leek.

=== Vocaloid adaptation ===
In September 2007, a cover of "Ievan polkka" was made, sung by Vocaloid Hatsune Miku, with Otomania arranging the music and providing Miku's voice manipulation. It was accompanied by an animation of a chibi version of Hatsune Miku waving a Welsh onion. To date, the video has over 12 million views on Nico Nico Douga and YouTube combined, and as a result, Miku's fame for the Welsh onion-twirling outshone Orihime's.

The popularity of the Vocaloid version of "Ievan polkka" has led to the chibi-Miku featured in the video being treated as a separate character known as Hachune Miku. Good Smile Company produced a Nendoroid action figure version of her.

== See also ==
- Music of Finland
