= Otava Yo =

Russian folk rock band

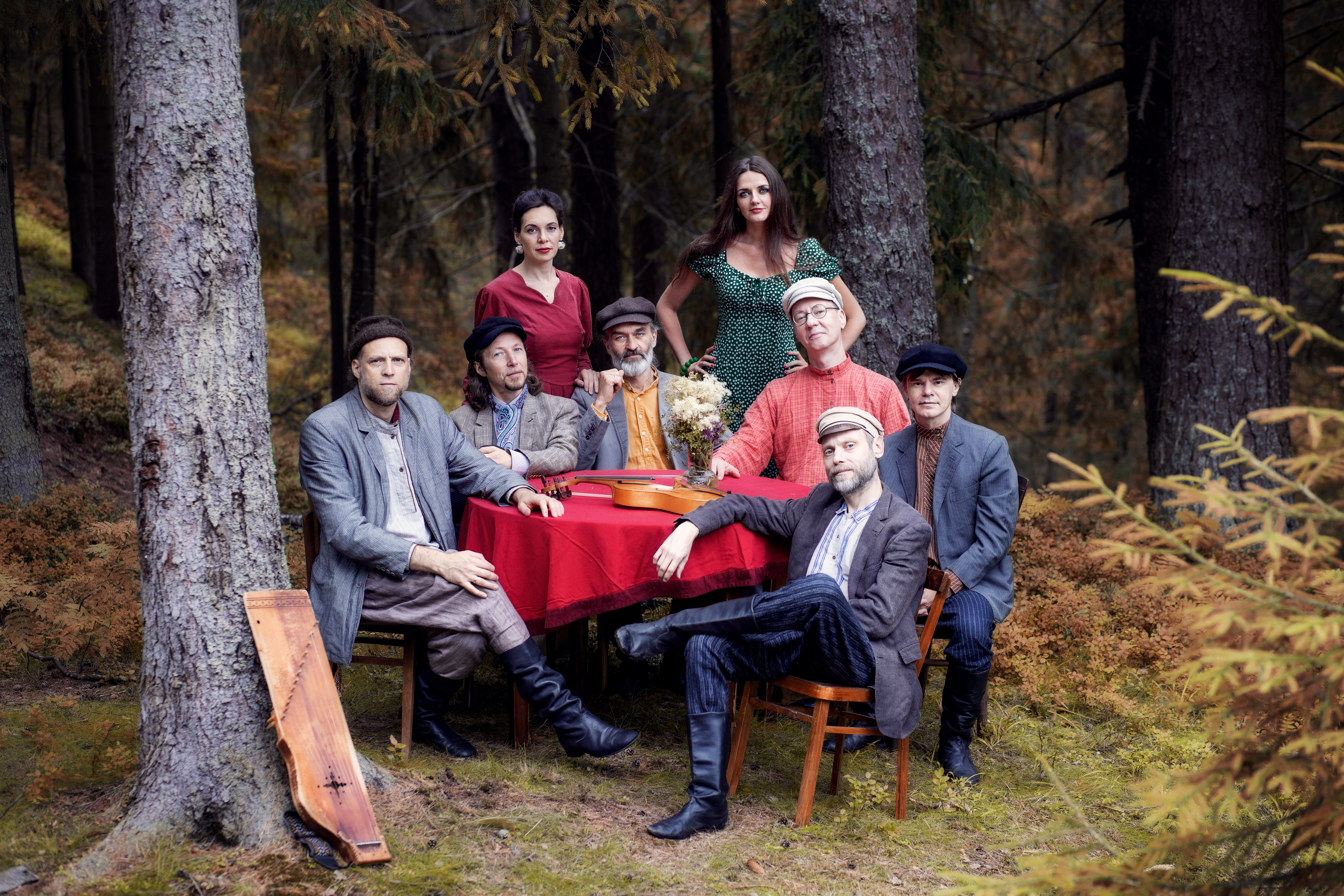

Background information
- Also known as: Reelroadъ
- Origin: Saint Petersburg, Russia
- Genres: Folk rock; world music
- Years active: 2003–present
- Labels: Navigator; ARC Music; CPL
- Members: Members
- Website: otava-yo.sbp.ru

Otava Yo (Russian: Отава Ё, ота́ва meaning "aftergrass") is a Russian folk rock band from Saint Petersburg, formed in 2003.

The band has performed in 30 countries, including Mexico, France, Estonia, China, Portugal, Latvia, Lithuania, Slovakia, Poland, Germany, The Netherlands, Austria, Finland, Belgium, Norway, India, the United States, the UK, Italy, Denmark, Iran and Japan.

== History ==
Alexey Belkin, Alexey Skosyrev, Dmitriy Shikhardin, and Peter Sergeev worked together as buskers on the streets of St. Petersburg for about three years. The positive feedback from the listeners inspired them to officially form a band in 2003. Of the initial members, only Shikhardin had formal musical education; the rest were self-taught. Initially the band was called Reelroadъ and they played The Pogues-styled Celtic punk, but later changed their name to Otava Yo and turned to Russian traditional music.

In 2005 they released their first studio album, “Pod Aptekoj”, named after their favourite street performance spot near a homeopathic pharmacy on Nevsky Prospect.

Four years later, in 2009, Otava Yo released their second studio album, "Zhyli-byli", continuing into a musical direction they called "Russian beat".

The band released their next album, "Rozhdestvo", in 2011. Containing traditional Christmas songs, it marked a deviation from their characteristic musical direction, that they ultimately returned to in their 2013 album "Chto za pesni".

The band's breakthrough came with the video for the song “Sumetskaya”, featuring Russian fist fighters. In 2015, “Sumetskaya” reached the No. 1 position on World Music Network’s February Video Chart, and had been viewed more than 12 million times on YouTube - a number that reached 14 million in 2018, setting the record as the most-watched music video by a Russian folk band.

In October 2018, Otava Yo announced their next album "Lyubish li ty?" had entered the mixing and mastering stage. On September 30, 2018, the band released a video for a song from the upcoming album, "Kak na gorke, na gore" (Once Upon a Time on a High Hill), filmed at the Podporozhsky District in June.

On 26 February 2022, Otava Yo announced that it would suspend its concerts in Russia and its upcoming tour in Germany, in response to the Russian military invasion of Ukraine. The announcement (currently removed) stated: "[W]e all are unwilling participants of these tragic events... [U]nder these circumstances we cannot pretend that nothing is happening and continue playing our cheerful music." The group offered to refund tickets.

In April 2022, Otava Yo announced that they would return to concerts, including new dates for the concerts previously cancelled in March 2022 and dates for new concerts in other Russian cities.

During their live-streamed Fall, 2022 concert on 6 November, they announced a forthcoming new album and suggested it would be released by an as-yet unannounced major label, with worldwide distribution.

== Members ==
=== Current members ===
- Alexey Belkin (Алексей Белкин) – vocals, bagpipes, gusli, zhaleika
- Dmitriy Shikhardin (Дмитрий Шихардин) – vocals, fiddle
- Pyotr Sergeev (Пётр Сергеев) – bass drum, darabouka
- Alexey Skossyrev (Алексей Скосырев) – vocals, acoustic guitar
- Vasiliy Telegin (Василий Телегин) – bass guitar (ca. 2019–present)
- Yulia Usova (Юлия Усова) – vocals, violin (2011–present)
- Lina Kolesnik (Лина Колесник) – vocals, violin (2019–present; originally substituting for Yulia Usova on maternity leave)
- Denis Nikiforov (Денис Никифоров) – drums (ca. 2019–present)

=== Past members ===
- Svetlana Kondesyuk (Светлана Кондесюк) – bagpipe, flute (2003–2009)
- Natalya Vysokikh (Наталья Высоких) – violin (2005–2010)
- Timur Sigidin (Тимур Сигидин) – bass guitar (2009–ca. 2019)

== Discography ==
Year	Title	Translation	Label	Format
2006	Под аптекой	By the Pharmacy	None	CD
2009	Жили-были	Once Upon a Time	None	CD
2011	Рождество	Christmas	None	CD
2013	Что за песни	What Songs	None	CD
2015	Лучшие песни 2006 - 2015	Best Songs 2006 - 2015	Navigator Records	CD, DVD
2015	Дайте маленькое времечко весёлому побыть!	Give just a little time to be merry!	None	CD, DVD
2018	Любишь ли ты?	Do You Love?	Navigator Records	CD
2024	Правильно и внятно	Loud and Clear	Navigator Records, Arc Music	CD, LP
Italicized text denotes a future album release

== Videography ==
- 2010: Про Диму и Петю (The Story of Dima and Petya)
- 2012: Про Ивана Groove (The Tale of Ivan Groove)
- 2012: Дворник (Street Cleaner)
- 2014: Что за песни (What Songs)
- 2015: Сумецкая (Sumetskaya)
- 2016: Иванушка-рачек (Ivan the Crayfish)
- 2017: Ой, Дуся, ой, Маруся (Oh, Dusya, My Marusya)
- 2018: На речке, на речке (By the River)
- 2018: Как на горке, на горе (Once Upon a Time on a High Hill)
- 2019: Яблочко (Little Apple)
- 2020: У кошки четыре ноги (A Cat Has Four Legs)
- 2020: Посеяли девки лён (Maidens Have Sown the Flax)
- 2020: Смуглянка (Smuglianka) (On the occasion of the 75th Victory Day (9 May))
- 2021: Тимоня (Timonya)
- 2021: Давно мы дома не были (We Have Not Been Home for a Long Time) (On the occasion of the 76th Victory Day (9 May))
- 2022: Эта ночь святая (This Holy Night)
- 2023: Добрый вечер (Good evening)
- 2023: Финская полька (Ievan polka)
- 2023: Пора молодцу жениться (It is time for the lad to get married)
- 2024: На небе зорька (A new dawn)
- 2024: Не летай-ка, соловей (Don't you fly, nightingale)
- 2024: Пойдём, братцы, вдоль улицы (Let's take a walk down the street, brethren)
- 2025: Идя-идя да мой миленький домой (He's coming, my sweetheart)
- 2026: Ой, ты, бриченька (Hey, My Surrey!)

== Awards and nominations ==
Year	Song	Award	Category	Result
2017	Oh, Dusya, my Marusya	NYC Indie Film Award	Best Music Video	Won
2017	Oh, Dusya, my Marusya	Maykop International Film Festival	Best Music Video	Won
2017	Oh, Dusya, my Marusya	Russian World Music Awards	Best Music Video	Won
2018	Oh, Dusya, my Marusya	BELIFF London International Film Festival	Best Music Video	Won
2018	Once Upon a Time on a High Hill	Los Angeles Film Awards	Best Music Video	Won
2019	Once Upon a Time on a High Hill	California Music Video Awards	Best Foreign Language Video	Won
2021	Timonya	Santorini Film Festival	Best Music Video	Won
