= Sanna Kurki-Suonio =

Finnish singer, kantele player and composer

Sanna Kurki-Suonio (born 1966) is a Finnish singer, kantele player and composer in the contemporary folk / neo-folk music genre. She is most well known for her work with the band Hedningarna, which extended over eight years between 1991 and 1999. She was also a founding member of the group Loituma.

After her first solo album, Musta, was released in 1998, she toured the United States and Europe with Swedish viola player Magnus Stinnerbom. Since then, she has composed the Kalevala 150th Anniversary concert (working with Finnish rock musician A. W. Yrjänä), and has contributed to recordings by Ismo Alanko, Pekka Lehti, Hannu Saha, Transjoik, Frode Fjellheim, Tellu Turkka and the Tapiola Chamber Choir. She recently completed a new album, Kainuu, with kantele player Riitta Huttunen.

Sanna taught singing at the Sibelius Academy in Helsinki until 2002. Now she teaches at the academy in Joensuu.

== Discography ==
- with Hedningarna
  - Kaksi (1992)
  - Trä (1994)
  - Karelia Visa (1999)
- with Tellu Turkka
  - Suden Aika (1997)
- solo
  - Musta (1998)
  - Huria (2007)
  - Sanna Kurki-Suonion Kuolematon Erikoissysteemi (2015)
- with Riitta Huttunen
  - Kainuu (2004)

== Also appears on ==
- Beginner's Guide to Scandinavia, 3-CD set (2011)
