= Lyngby-Taarbæk Symfoniorkester =

Lyngby-Taarbæk Symfoniorkester (transl. Lyngby-Taarbæk Philharmonic Orchestra) is a full philharmonic amateur orchestra based in Kgs. Lyngby, Denmark. It consists of a mixed group of conservatory students and amateur musicians, ranging in age from the early teens to the 50s and 60s. It is usually conducted by well-known guest conductors, and complemented by solo musicians for particular pieces. It has a reputation as one of the best amateur orchestras in Denmark.

Founded in 1957 as part of the local municipal music school, it became a wholly independent orchestra in 1980. The orchestra usually takes up three projects a year, ending the season with a concert in Tivoli's Concert Hall. The orchestra performs mostly in the greater Copenhagen area, but has in recent years visited such places as France, Sweden, Italy, UK, the Faroe Islands, Austria and Latvia. In October 2009, the orchestra visited Rotterdam in the Netherlands and performed in the Arminius Church.
