= Ievan polkka =

Finnish song

"Ievan polkka" (Finnish for "Ieva's Polka") is a Finnish song with lyrics printed in 1928 and written by Eino Kettunen to a traditional Finnish polka tune. The song is sung in an Eastern Savonian dialect spoken in North Karelia. It is sung from the point of view of a young man, about a woman called Ieva (dialectal for the name Eva or Eeva in standard Finnish) who sneaks out and dances the polka with him all night. The melody of the song is a folk tune known since the 1700s, but the lyrics by Eino Kettunen are still under copyright. Later, a scat singing segment of the song by the band Loituma was incorporated into the viral animation Loituma Girl. In September 2007, the song was brought into worldwide popular culture through a cover sung by Hatsune Miku, with Otomania arranging the music and providing Miku's voice manipulation.

== Origin ==
In South Karelia, "Ievan polkka" is also known as "Savitaipaleen polkka", due to its similarity to a tune of that name. Polka was introduced into Northern Europe during the late 19th century, which implies that the tune, as it is known today, originates from this era.

The song is in the minor hexatonic mode; the Loituma version is in E-flat minor.

== Popularity ==
Owing to its viral exposure in popular culture, "Ievan polkka" has become one of the most famous Finnish songs in the world.

Very popular after World War II, the song was almost forgotten during the late 1970s and 1980s. The song resurfaced after an a cappella performance by the Finnish quartet Loituma on the Yle TV2 show Soi soitto soi in 1996, whose song was first released on their debut album, Loituma, in 1995. The Loituma lyrics and arrangement are under copyright and published by Warner Chappell Music outside the Nordic countries. The album was released in the United States as Things of Beauty in 1998.

The Loituma version of the song acquired great international popularity as part of an Internet phenomenon in the spring of 2006, when the Loituma Girl (also known as Leekspin), a looped animation of anime character Orihime Inoue from the Bleach series twirling either a spring onion (in the Japanese original) or a leek (in the English dub), set to a scat singing section of the song, was posted on Russian LiveJournal. For the animation, only the second half of the fifth stanza (four lines) and the complete sixth stanza (eight lines) are used. It quickly became a global hit and the song soon enjoyed overwhelming popularity as a ringtone. Since then, the song has been circulating under several misspelled variations of its original name, including "Ievas polkka", "Levan polkka" (due to the similarity between the sans-serif lowercase L (l) and uppercase i (I)) and "Leekspin Song".

Fans of the Vocaloid software have made Vocaloid voicebanks, such as Megurine Luka, Kagamine Rin, and Kagamine Len cover the song. The most popular Vocaloid cover belonged to Japanese artist Otomania, who in 2007 made Hatsune Miku sing it with the nonsensical lyrics by Loituma. The official music video has garnered close to 6.5 million views on Niconico by May 2024. It features a chibi derivative of Hatsune Miku, officially known as Hatchune Miku, holding a spring onion in reference to Loituma Girl, and is the origin of her association with spring onions or leeks. Its popularity resulted in its use by the Vocaloid rhythm game series Hatsune Miku: Project DIVA, mainly as tutorial music. It has also been used in a commercial promoting the LG G5 smartphone.

In 2012, the Finnish folk metal band Korpiklaani recorded a cover of the song for their eighth album Manala. A version of the song performed by Anne Kulonen was part of a Ready Brek television advert aired in the United Kingdom.

A part of the song was featured during the interval show of the Eurovision Song Contest 2024, played over a brief Finland dance tribute, with performers dressed in the Finnish national attire and sauna-towels, dancing around Moomin-characters, before Käärijä entering, performing his "Cha Cha Cha" song from the Eurovision Song Contest 2023.

== Loituma version ==
=== Charts ===
Chart (2007)	Peak positions
Germany (GfK)	48

== Other versions ==
- Matti Jurva (1937, different melody, omits the fifth verse)
- Onni Laihanen (1947)
- Jorma Ikävalko (1950, earliest version with lyrics and the traditional melody as Onni Laihanen's version was instrumental)
- Lumberjack Band (1952)
- Arttu Suuntala (1966)
- Pauli Räsänen (1972)
- Sukellusvene (as "Savitaipaleen polkka") (1979)
- DJ Sharpnel (as "PRETTY GREEN ONIONS") (2006)
- Holly Dolly (as "Dolly Song [Ieva's Polka]") (2006)
- Hatsune Miku (2007)
- Kagamine Rin/Len (2007)
- Ensiferum (as Token of Time) (2008)
- Basshunter (2009)
- Kuunkuiskaajat (2010)
- Korpiklaani (2012)
- Salut Salon (2013)
- Busy Signal (2014)
- Liza, the Fox-Fairy (2015) Soundtrack
- Erika Ikuta (2016)
- Eugene Magalif (az "EVA's POLKA Variations for Flute Orchestra and Blown Bottles" published by FORTON Music (UK)) (2016)
- Marina Devyatova (as "Finnish Polka") (2016)
- Otava Yo (as "Finnish Polka") (2017)
- Tuuletar (2018)
- Babymetal (as Oh! Majinai feat. Joakim Brodén) (2019)
- Shirakami Fubuki (2019)
- Bilal Göregen (2019)
- Akai Haato (2020)
- The Kiffness (2020)
- Sea Shanty (cover Girl With The Leek published by Spinnin' Records) (2021)
- Masha Ray (Dancing Donkey Mix) (2022)

== See also ==
- Säkkijärven polkka
