= Tellu Turkka =

Finnish violinist and singer

Tellu Turkka (formerly Tellu Paulasto, Tellu Virkkala, born 1969, Koskenpää) is a Finnish fiddler and singer in the contemporary folk / neo-folk music genre. She studied violin at the Jyväskylä Conservatory from 1978 to 1985, at the Savonlinna Art College from 1985 to 1988, and at the Folk Music Department of the Sibelius Academy from 1989 to 2001. She also studied Hardanger Fiddle with Ånon Egeland in Norway from 1992 to 1993.

She is probably best known for her work with the band Hedningarna (1990–1996, 2001–2003). During her work with Hedningarna, she developed a strong interest in the ancient Finnish runo-songs, which compose the Finnish national epic, the Kalevala.

Tellu has also performed with the ensembles Loituma (1989–1991; she was a founding member), Piniartut, Tallari (1997–1998, 2001–2002) and Luna Nova (1996–2001), and is currently performing with her group Suden Aika along with Liisa Matveinen, Katariina Airas and Nora Vaura. She also participated in Ruth MacKenzie's musical theatre performance Kalevala: Dream of the Salmon Maiden at the Guthrie Theatre in Minneapolis in 1999.

== Discography ==
=== With Hedningarna ===
- Kaksi (1992)
- Trä (1994)

=== With Liisa Matveinen ===
- Mateli (1999)

=== Solo ===
- Pähkinänsydän (1999; children's music)

=== With Piniartut ===
- Piniartut (2001; Tellu also produced this album)

=== With Tallari ===
- Virtaa (1999)
- Mieron tammat (2002)
- Runolaulutanssit (2003)

=== With Suden Aika ===
- Suden Aika (1996)
- Etsijä (2004)
- Unta (2006)
