= Nordanstigs spelmanslag =

Nordanstigs spelmanslag is a Swedish folk music fiddler-team (Swedish: spelmanslag) in Hälsingland, Sweden. It was formed in 1952 and is based in Bergsjö and plays Swedish folk music from the Bergsjö-Hassela region area in Hälsingland. Three of their most well known fiddlers are "O'tôrgs-Kaisa" (Kaisa Abrahamsson), Lennart Eriksson and Thomas von Wachenfeldt.

The team play mainly folk music tunes from the north of Hälsingland; compositions after famous Hälsingian folk musicians such as Hultkläppen, Katrina Lundstedt, Malångs-August, Jon-Erik Öst, Lars-Erik Forslin, Per-Erik Svedin, Korp-Erik, Gammelbo-Lars, Pelle Schenell, Hägg-Erske, Pusten, Sammels Jon-Erik and Dôv-Ante.

Nordanstig – the municipality of north Hälsingland – covers the communities of Hassela, Bergsjö, Gnarp, Jättendal, Harmånger, Stocka and Strömsbruk.

== Discography ==
- Ur gamla källor (2004) (O'tôrgs-Kaisa Abrahamsson & musicians)
- Spelmanslåtar från Mottiland (2005) (Thomas von Wachenfeldt & musicians)
- Viller (2006)
- Malleus Clericum - Hinslåtar, Näckvalser och Häxdanser (2010) (Thomas von Wachenfeldt solo)
