= Holly Dolly =

Animated singing female donkey

- Origin: Italy
- Genres: Electronic, Pop/Rock
- Years active: 2006–present
- Label: Ipnotika

Holly Dolly is an animated pop musician whose debut single "Dolly Song (Ievan Polkka)" was internationally successful in the summer of 2006. Holly Dolly was an animated, singing female donkey from Italy. Holly Dolly's debut album, Pretty Donkey Girl, was also released in 2006, including cover versions of "La Isla Bonita" by Madonna and "Don't Worry, Be Happy" by Bobby McFerrin. Some of the tracks on the album were largely or completely a cappella.

As the story goes, Holly Dolly was a little donkey-girl from the country whose dream was to be a big star. Upon meeting four guardian angels, she was granted wishes to make her dreams come true.

In August 2006, the German ringtone provider Jamba! began selling a collection of media based on Holly Dolly. The video shows a variety of different animated dancers, but mostly focuses on Holly Dolly.

Holly Dolly's songs include "The Dolly Song", "My Name is Dolly", "Ciao Ciao Goodbye", "The Jingle Bell Rock", "Holly's Farm", "Horror Show", "Don't Worry Be Happy", "Holly Sumba", "Mister Joe", "Santa Baby", "Pretty Intro", "Slap and Tickle", "La Isla Bonita", "Lollypop", "Limbo Rock" and "Without Control".
