= Magnus Stinnerbom =

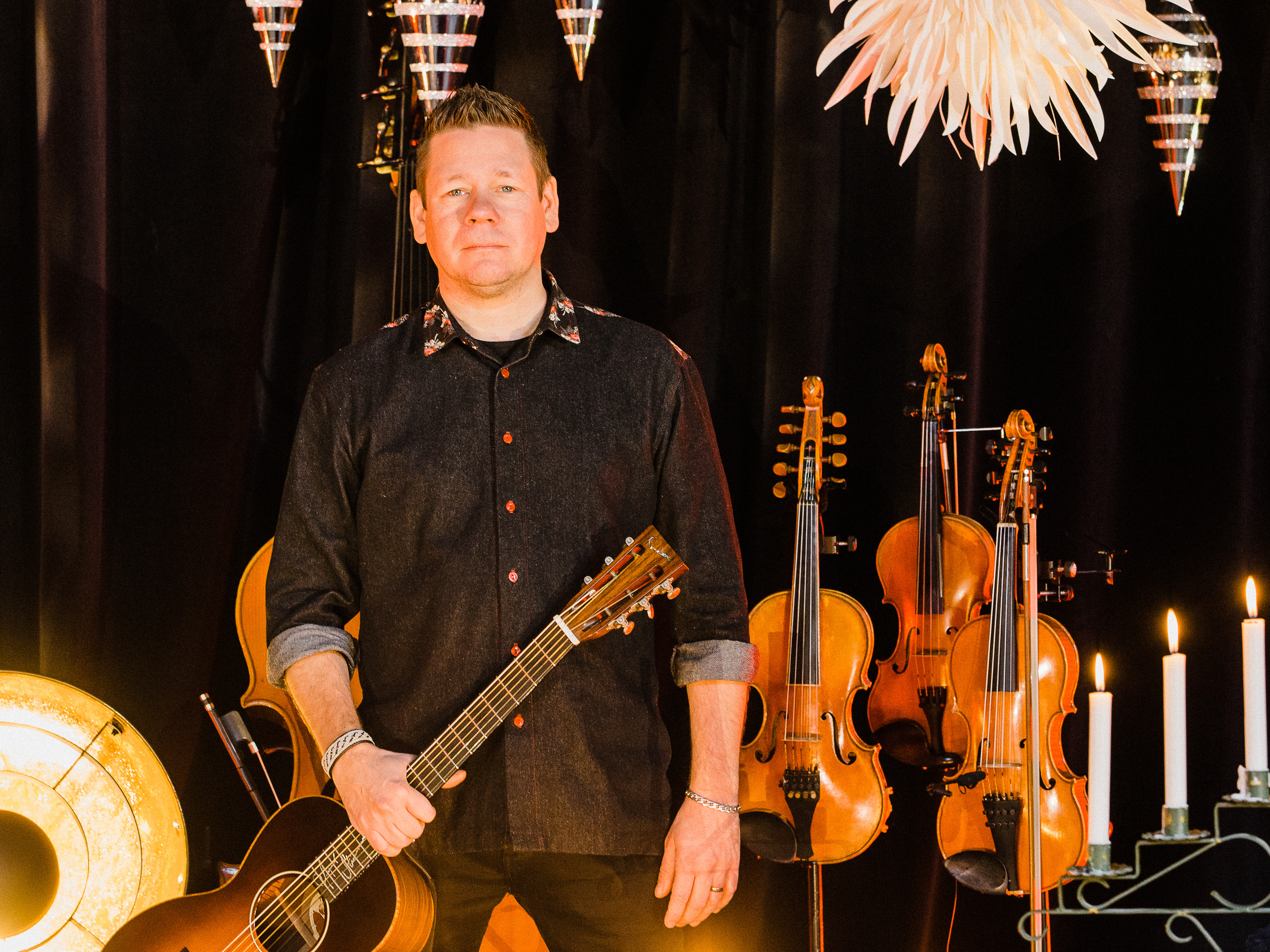

Background information
- Born: 29 December 1977 (age 48); Gothenburg, Sweden
- Genre: Nordic folk
- Occupation: Fiddler
- Instruments: Viola, fiddle
- Spinoffs: Harv, Hedningarna, Sanna Kurki-Suonio

Magnus Stinnerbom is a fiddler born on 29 December 1977 in Gothenburg, now living in Värmland, Sweden, whose principal instrument is the viola. He is the son of the influential fiddler Leif Stinnerbom, who co-founded the Nordic folk band Groupa. Magnus is currently playing with the groups Harv (with Daniel Sandén-Warg) and Hedningarna. He has toured the U.S. and Europe with Finnish singer Sanna Kurki-Suonio, and he has also contributed to the record Nils Holgersson.
