= Den Fule =

Swedish folk rock band

- Origin: Sweden
- Genre: Folk rock
- Years active: 1992–1998
- Label: Xource Records; NorthSide Records

Den Fule is a Swedish folk rock band founded in the early 1990s primarily by artists dominant in the Swedish folk rock scene of the 1970s.

== Biography ==
Den Fule (meaning "The ugly one") was formed primarily from veterans of the 1970s Swedish folk rock scene. The band produced two albums through Xource Records in the early 1990s then disbanded. Their first album Lugumleik met with immediate critical acclaim and won the Swedish Grammy for "Best Folk Music Album of the Year 1993". The album was described for the Swedish Grammy awards as a blend of jazz, rock, funk and traditional folk music.

Although the band's music is largely adapted from traditional Nordic folk music, it crosses numerous genres, combining R&B elements with rock riffs and jazz phrasing. The melodic component of the music is dominated by flute and saxophone; numerous tracks are instrumental but male and female vocals are occasionally used.

A compilation of their first two albums was released by NorthSide Records in 1997.

== Band members ==
- Jonas Simonson - flute, bass saxophone
- Sten Källman - soprano saxophone, baritone saxophone, percussion
- Henrik Cederblom - guitar, percussion
- Stefan Bergman - bass
- Christian Jormin - drums and percussion
- Ellika Frisell - violin (on Lugumleik)
- Ingrid Brännströmm - guest vocals (on Lugumleik)
- Ola Bäckström - violin (on Skalv)
- Henrik Wallgren - vocals (on Skalv)

== Discography ==
- Lugumleik (1993, CD)
- Skalv (1994, CD)
- Quake (1997, CD compilation of first two albums)
- Halling i köket (2010, CD)
- Contrabande (2013, CD)
