= Leif Alpsjö =

Swedish folk musician

Leif Alpsjö (born 1943, Uppsala) is a Swedish folk musician. In 1974 he was awarded the status of riksspelman on the fiddle, and that same year he also took up the nyckelharpa (Swedish key-fiddle). He is self-taught, and has been a full-time fiddler since 1975.
