= Garmarna =

Swedish folk rock band

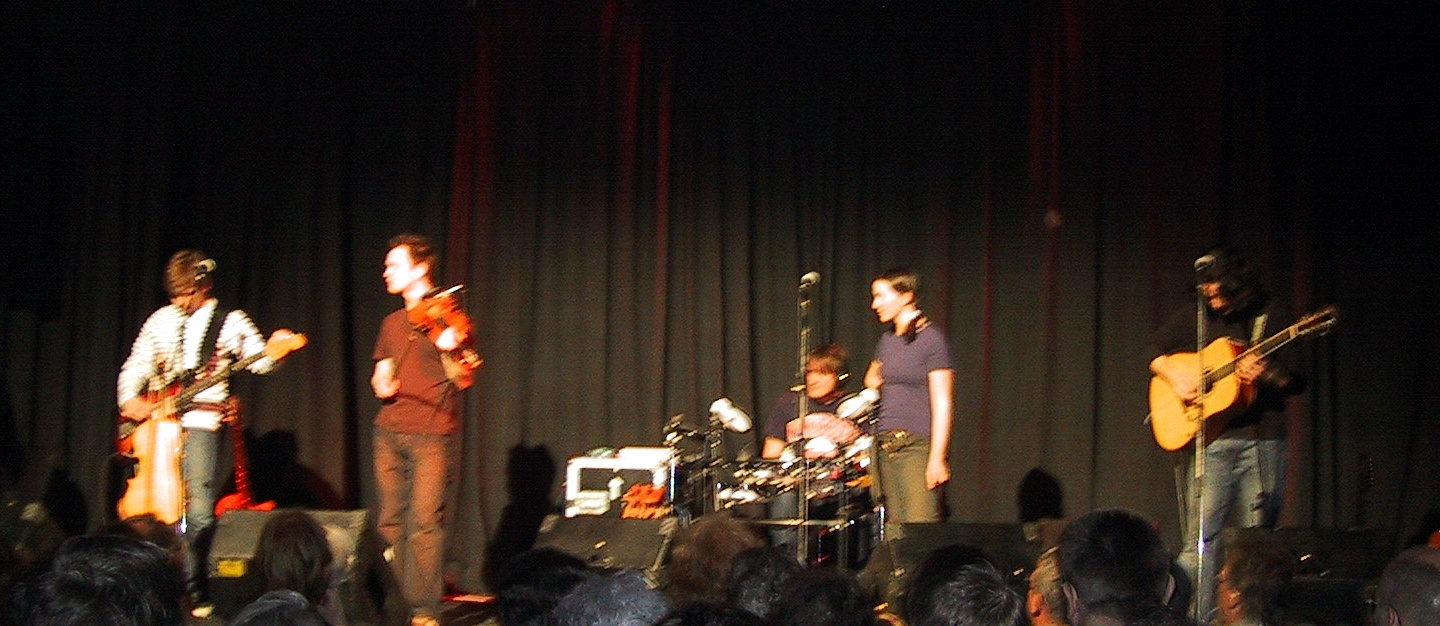
- Band presentation in 2002

Background information
- Origin: Sundsvall, Sweden
- Genres: World music; Folk; Folk rock; Folktronica; Neofolk; Nordic; Roots Revival
- Years active: 1990–present
- Labels: Season of Mist; Massproduktion; NorthSide (USA)
- Members: Stefan Brisland-Ferner; Emma Härdelin; Jens Höglin; Gotte Ringqvist; Rickard Westman
- Website: https://fearmusic.se

Garmarna is a Swedish folk rock band. Their songs are mainly old Scandinavian ballads.

== Biography ==
Garmarna was founded in 1990. Stefan Brisland-Ferner, Gotte Ringqvist and Rickard Westman were inspired by old Swedish music, which they had heard in a theatre. They began searching for old tunes and instruments. After two years of playing together, Jens Höglin joined the band on drums.

In 1992 the band recorded their first EP. They thought that female vocals would provide a contrast to the dark mood of their music and invited Emma Härdelin, a long-time friend of the band, as the guest vocalist on the EP. She officially joined the band in 1993. The debut EP sold well in Sweden, and helped the band tour in Scandinavia.

On the album Vittrad, the band decided to add samples and sequencers to the mix. In 1994, Omnium released Vittrad in the United States, with English translations of the old songs.

Garmarna started a long German tour and released the album Guds spelemän in 1996. The album sold well in Sweden and was reviewed favourably internationally.

In 1998 Garmarna did a series of concerts in churches in the North of Sweden presenting their interpretation of the medieval works of Hildegard of Bingen, together with actress Felicia Konrad.

In 1999 the band released their third album Vedergällningen. The album's production leaned towards rock and trip hop, the atmosphere of the music being more obscure than in previous albums.

After Vedergällningen, the band collaborated with Swedish House producer Eric S. for their next studio album Hildegard von Bingen, which was released in 2001. The tracks in this album are based on the compositions of 12th century German abbess Hildegard of Bingen, with the lyrics to each song being sung entirely in Latin.

In 2003, their first EP was released as a full album with six bonus tracks.

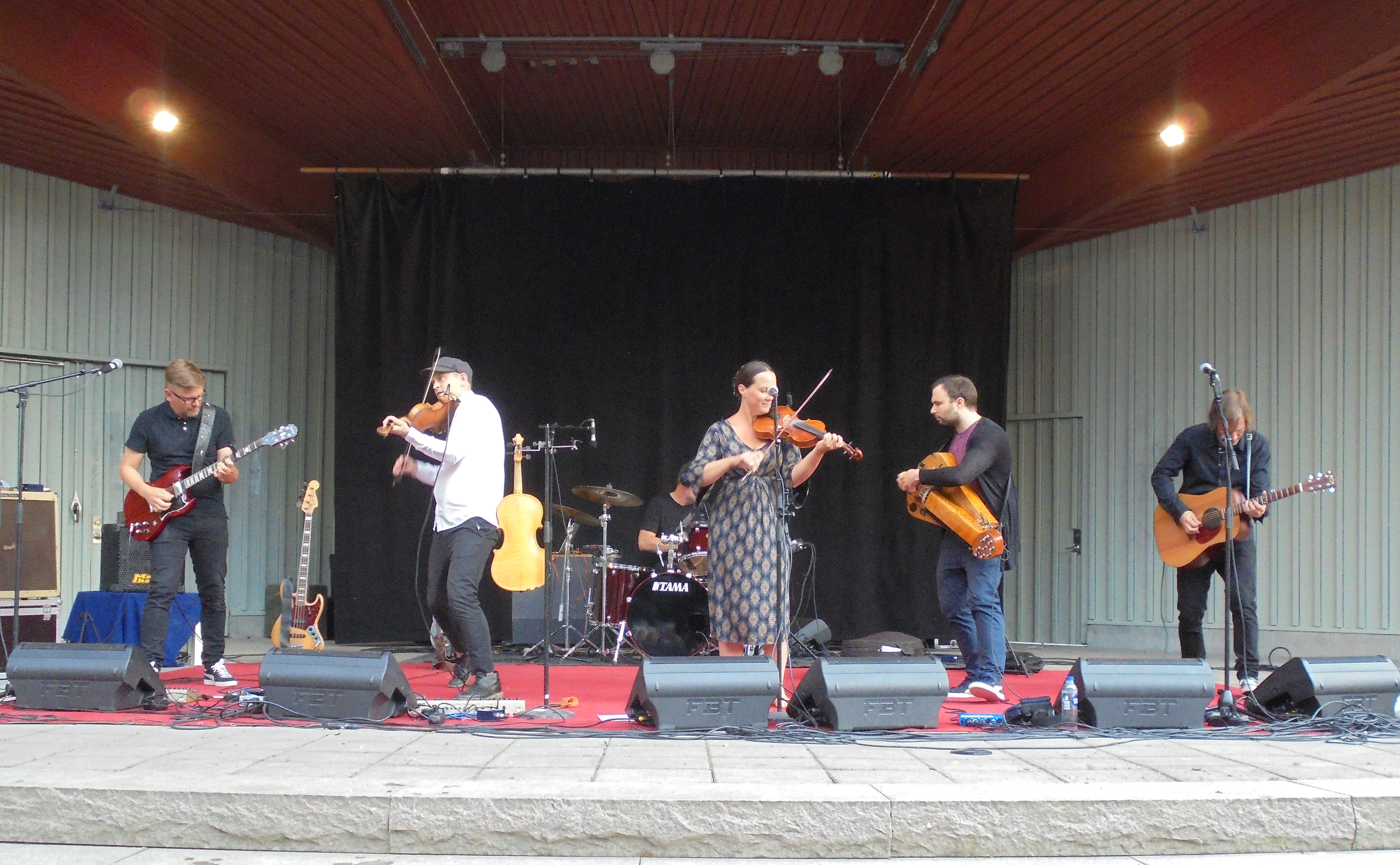
Garmarna with Johannes Geworkian Hellman in Uppsala, 2016

In 2016, the band released their sixth album called 6.

In 2018, Garmarna initiated a Kickstarter campaign to raise funds for a new album, Förbundet, to be released on November 6, 2020. The album was released on Season of Mist containing mostly interpretations of traditional Swedish folk songs and two original tracks by Garmarna. Guest musicians on this album include Maria Franz from Heilung and Anders Norudde from Hedningarna.

== Band members ==
- Stefan Brisland-Ferner – violin, hurdy-gurdy, sampler – on Garmarna (2003): jews harp, viola
- Emma Härdelin – vocals, violin
- Jens Höglin – drums, percussion – on Garmarna (2003): death grunts
- Gotte Ringqvist – guitar, violin, backing vocals – on Garmarna (2003): lute guitar, jew's harp
- Rickard Westman – guitar, bass, e-bow – on Garmarna (2003): bouzouki, lute guitar

== Discography ==
=== Albums ===
| Year | Title | Peak chart positions |
| Year | Title | SWE |
|---|---|---|
| 1993 | Garmarna (EP) | — |
| 1994 | Vittrad (Weathered) | — |
| 1996 | Guds spelemän (The Fiddlers of God) | 39 |
| 1999 | Vedergällningen (The Retribution) | 40 |
| 2001 | Hildegard von Bingen (album) | — |
| 2003 | Garmarna (re-release of the 1993 EP with 6 bonus tracks) | — |
| 2016 | 6 | — |
| 2020 | Förbundet (The Union) | — |

=== Singles ===
- "Herr Holger" (Sir Holger) (1996)
- "En gång ska han gråta" (One Day He Shall Cry) (1997)
- "Euchari" (1999)
- "Gamen" (The Vulture) (1999)
- "Över gränsen" (2015) (Over the Border)
- "Kashmir" (2019)
- "Ramunder" (2020)

=== Other ===
- "Rastlös" (Restless) in compilation We're Only in It for the Money (1999)
- Nordic Woman (2012)

== In popular culture ==
The single "Gamen" was featured in the 2003 video game Project Gotham Racing 2.

== See also ==
- Triakel
