= Guds spelemän =

Guds spelemän (The Fiddlers of God)

Studio album by Garmarna
- Released: 1996
- Genre: Folk

Garmarna chronology
Vittrad (1994)	Guds spelemän (The Fiddlers of God) (1996)	Vedergällningen (1999)

Professional ratings
Review scores
Source	Rating
Allmusic	2.5/5 stars

Guds spelemän is Garmarna's second full-length album, released in 1996. All songs except "Njaalkeme" (which is in Southern Sami) are sung in Swedish.

== Reception ==
The reviewer for AllMusic wrote that Garmarna managed to keep a straight-faced approach at presenting the content of the songs, instead of in a way "that might even have disturbed the Brothers Grimm".

== Track listing ==
1. "Herr Mannelig (Sir Mannelig)" – 6:22
2. "Vänner och Fränder (Friends and Relatives)" – 5:11
3. "Halling från Makedonien (Halling from Macedonia)" – 2:45
4. "Min Man (My Husband)" – 4:20
5. "Varulven (The Werewolf)" – 4:55
6. "Hilla Lilla" – 6:19
7. "Drew Drusnaar/Idag som igår (Today as Yesterday)" – 2:46
8. "Njaalkeme (Hunger)" – 5:05
9. "Herr Holger (Sir Holger)" – 4:58
10. "Guds Spelemän (The Fiddlers of God)" – 5:27

== Charts ==
Chart performance for Guds spelemän
Chart (1996)	Peak position
Swedish Albums (Sverigetopplistan)	39
