= Zorn Collections =

Coordinates: 61°0′25″N 14°32′17″E

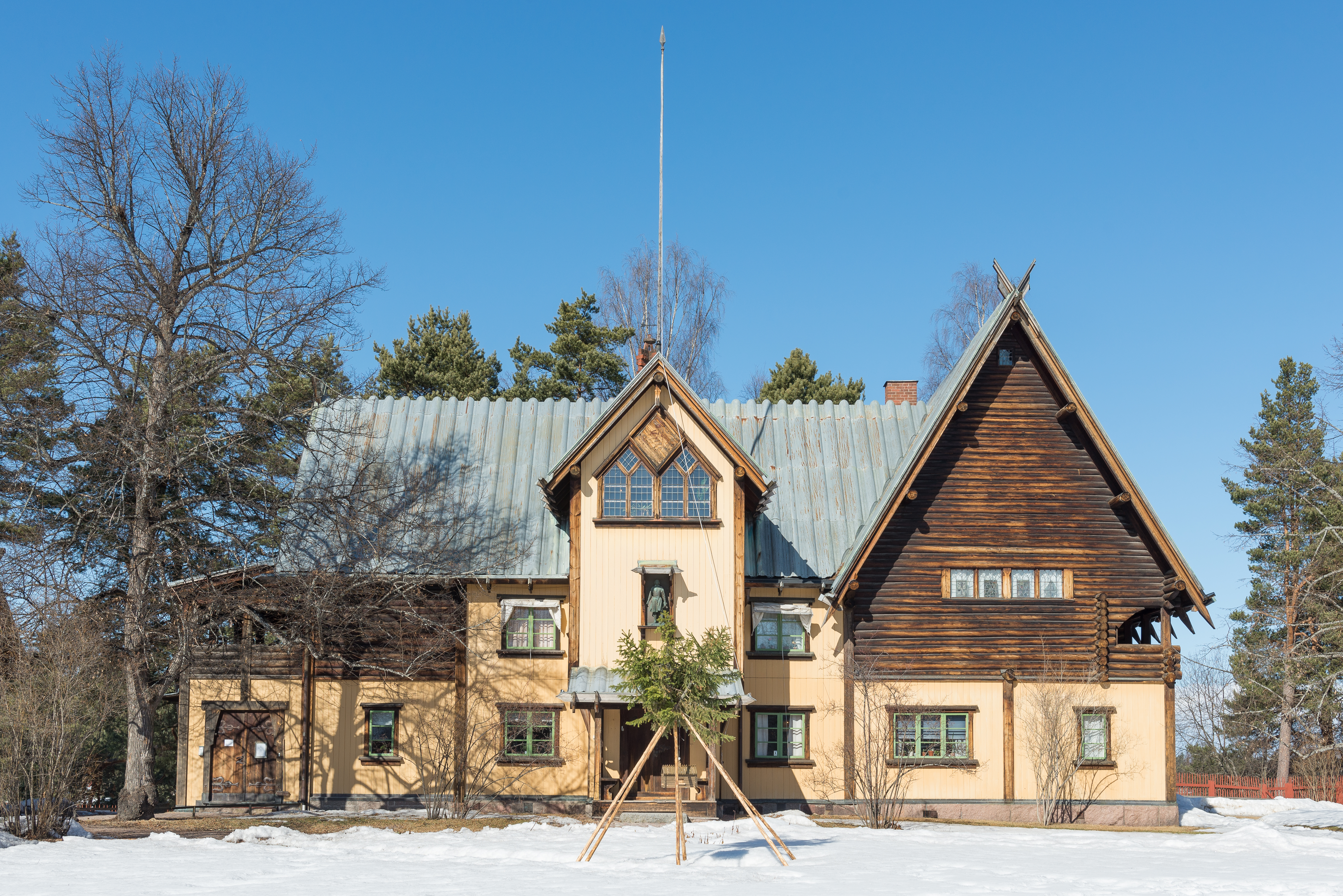
Zorngården

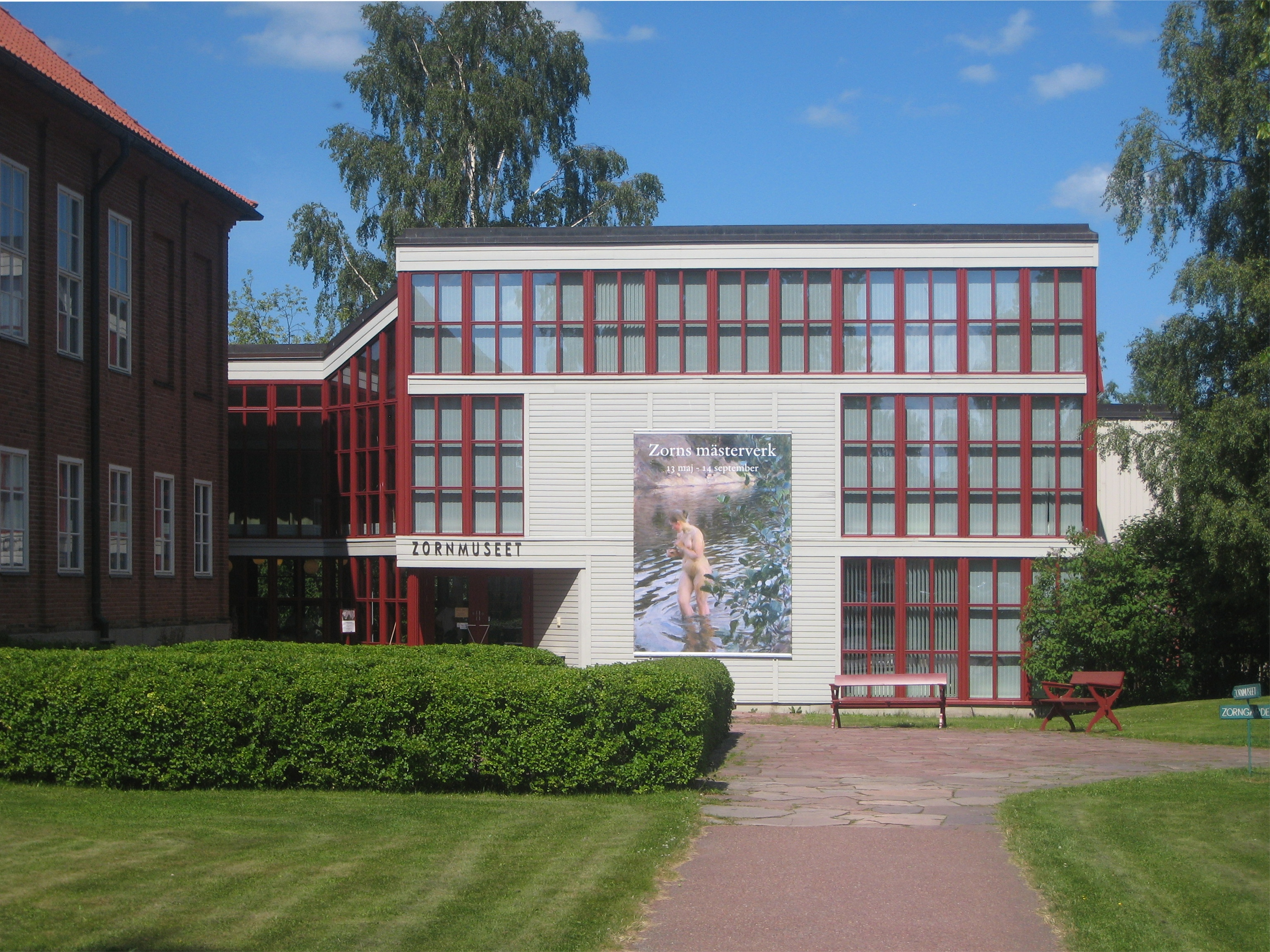
Zornmuseet

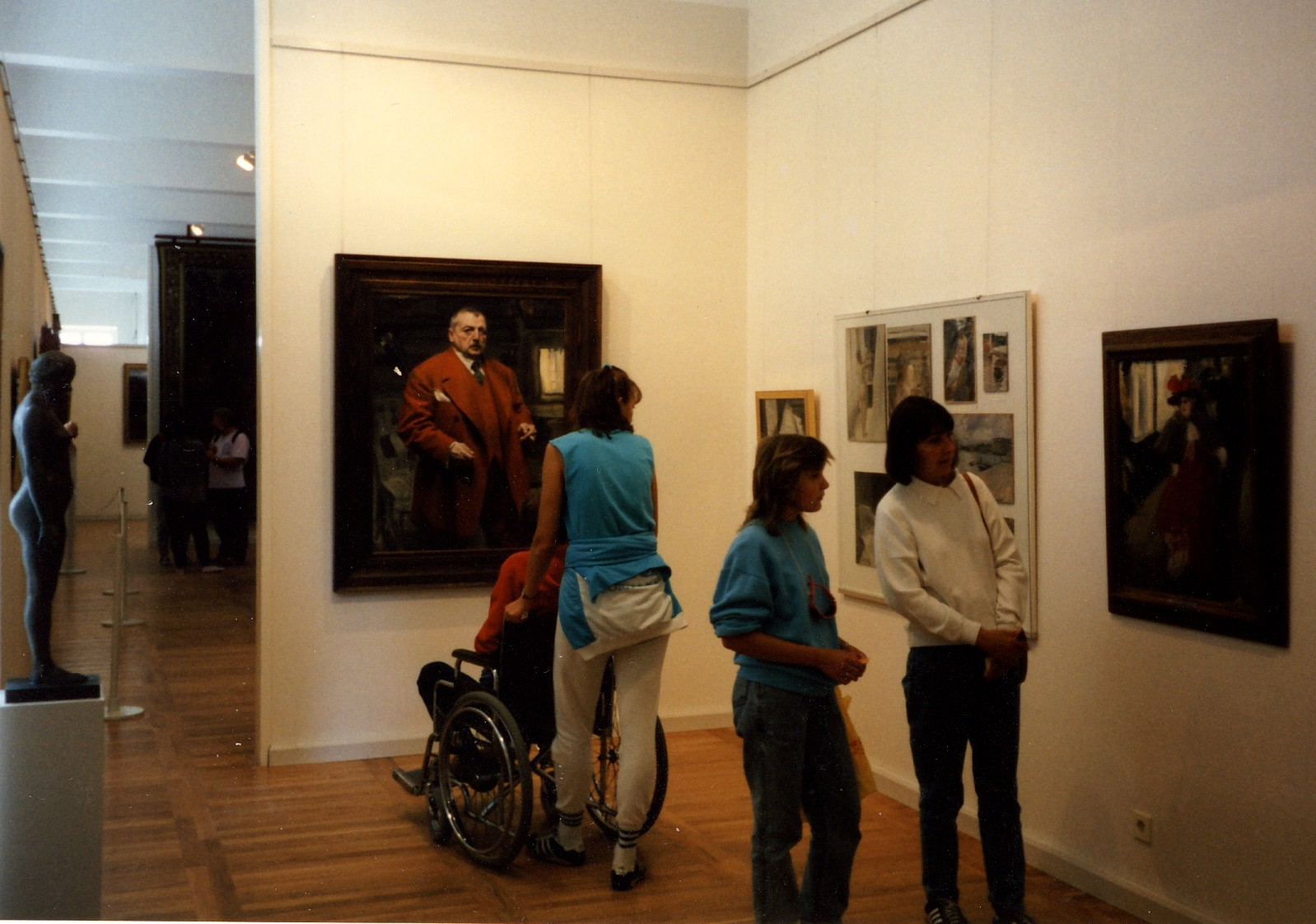
Inside Zornmuseet

The Zorn Collections, or Zornsamlingarna, is a Swedish state museum, located in Mora, dedicated to preserving the works by painter Anders Zorn.

Anders Zorn was one of Sweden's internationally best known artists. His fame abroad was founded mainly on his portraiture, with his ability to capture the character and personality of the depicted person. His nude studies are also very famous, as are his genre pictures which mostly depict working people and in which his swift and elegant impressionistic technique found its fullest scope.

The Zorn Collections administers Anders and Emma Zorn's donation to the Swedish State. The Zorn Collections consists of four museums: Zorngården, Zorn Museum, Zorn's Gammelgård & Textilkammare and Zorn's Gopsmor.

== Museums ==
- Zorngården was the home of Anders and Emma Zorn. It is shown today as it was at the time of Emma Zorn's death in 1942. Drawing inspiration from English and Swedish architecture, it is a fine example of the architecture which characterizes the years around 1900.
- The Zorn Museum (Swedish: Zornmuseet), Ragnar Östberg's last work, is a two-storied rectangular brick building in the classical style. The Zorn Museum mainly displays for work by Anders Zorn and examples of his artistic variety - oil paintings, water colors, etchings and sculptures.
- Gammelgård is Zorn's old farm consisting of about 40 old houses, grouped around a farm, a mill, chalets, and boathouses. Gammelgård provides the opportunity to see how the Dalarna farmers lived in the past. Textilkammare, the Textile Room, was added in 1993 to display parts of the Zorn family's collection of country textiles.
- Gopsmor was a combination of a fishing cottage and a wilderness studio, situated some 20 kilometers to the north of Mora. Zorn arranged for some old log buildings to be moved there. It became something of an escape for him when he became too well known in Mora.

== Sources ==
- Andrén, Arvid Classical antiquities in the Zorn Collection (Lund, Sweden 1947)
- Sandström, Birgitta Hairwork in the Zorn Collections (Mora, Sweden: 1995)

== See also ==
- List of Swedish artists
- List of single-artist museums
