= Anders Norudde =

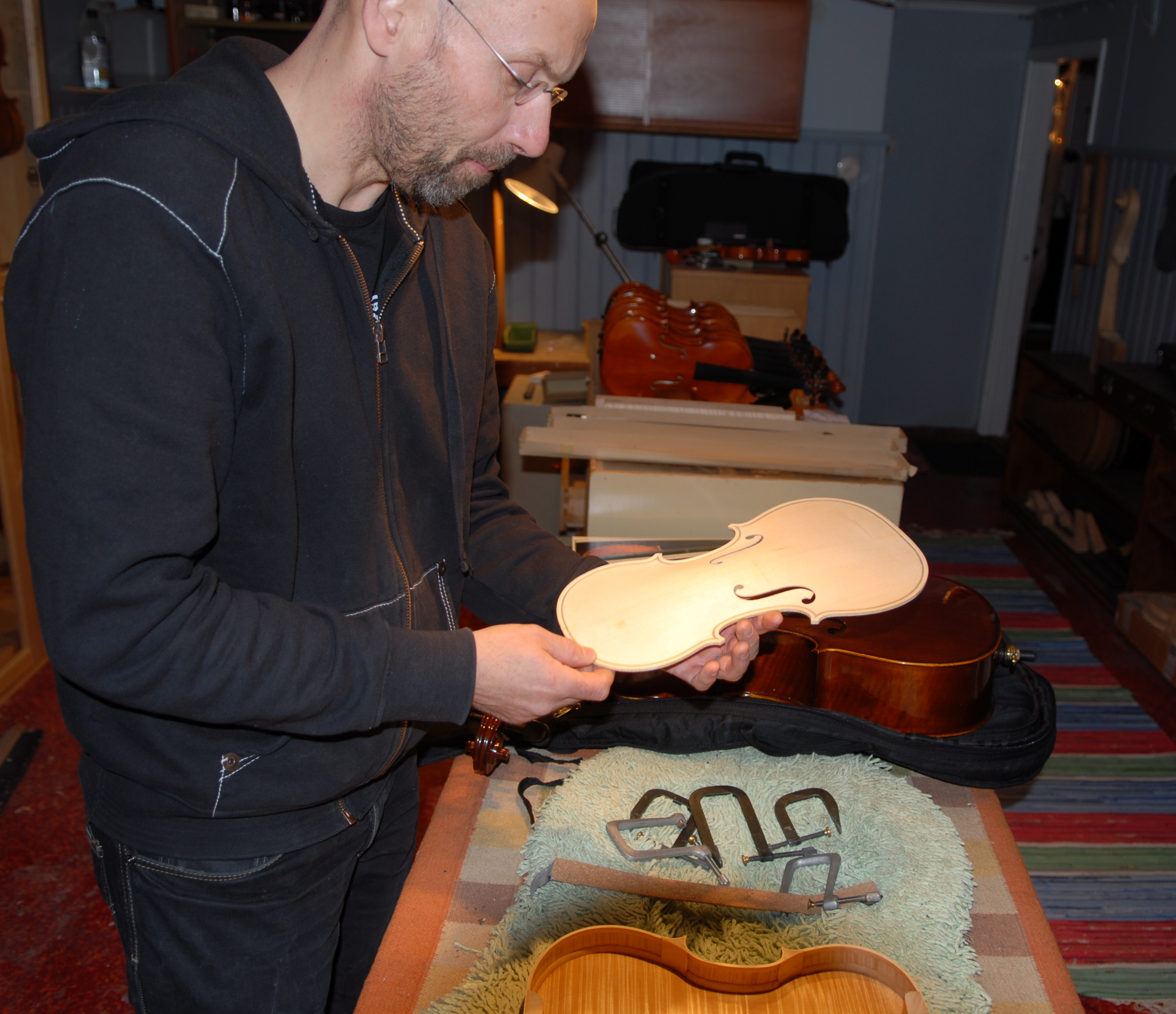

Background information
- Born: Anders Stake; 1960 (age 65–66)
- Origin: Sweden
- Genres: Swedish folk
- Occupations: Folk musician, multi-instrumentalist, luthier
- Instrument: Various folk instruments
- Years active: 1987–present

Anders Norudde (born Anders Stake, 1960) is a Swedish folk musician, multi-instrumentalist, and luthier. After finishing school, Anders took a job at the ironworks in Degerfors, where, in his spare time, he practiced orienteering and played rock music on the guitar. After hearing the band Kebnekajse on the radio, Anders became interested in the melodies of traditional Swedish folk music. He began attending folk music festivals in Ransäter, Värmland and was particularly inspired by the music of Anders Rosén and Mats Edén of Groupa.

He also developed an interest in the construction of musical instruments and participated in a four-year course in violin making in Leksand. Graduation from this course qualified him as a member of S.V.I.T. (Swedish Violinmakers in the Italian Tradition). Anders has built 41 fiddles (including the viola d'amore played by Magnus Stinnerbom), and has sold all but one of them (a Hardanger fiddle that he still plays).

In 1987, he formed the band Hedningarna (meaning "The Heathens") together with percussionist Björn Tollin and lutenist Hållbus Totte Mattson wanting to explore the possibilities of developing a new musical style based on elements of traditional music. The group wrote and played a major part in the music-to-theatre project Den stora vreden (rough translation: The Great Wrath) at Gävleborgs folkteater (the county theatre of Gävleborg), first time performed in 1988, that attracted much attention. A fairly large portion of the music on their first record was originally performed in that play.

Anders has dedicated an important amount of his creativity to the potentials offered by such ancient instruments as Swedish bagpipes, the moraharpa (an early predecessor of the nyckelharpa) and the sälgflöjt or willow flute. As part of his work with Hedningarna, Anders has constructed several unique instruments, some reproductions of ancient instruments such as the moraharpa, and some novel instruments based on a combination of traditional and modern design principles.

In the mid-'90s, Anders and his fiancée Ingrid spent a considerable amount of time and effort renovating the old cottage of Anders's grandmother, located in the northern part of the Udden headland in Lake Ölen, Degerfors, for which they won an award. When they married in 1997, they decided that they would both take a new surname. They decided on Norudde, in honor of the cottage.

He currently lives in Karlskoga with his wife Ingrid and two children, John and Hedda.

== Discography ==
- Hedningarna (with Hedningarna), 1989
- Kaksi (with Hedningarna), 1991
- Blå Bergens Borduner (The blue mountain drones), 1993
- Trä (with Hedningarna), 1994
- Kruspolska: SASHA mixes, 1994
- Hippjokk (with Hedningarna), 1997
- Karelia Visa (with Hedningarna), 1999
- Kan Själv / Himself (solo), 2000
- 1989–2003 (with Hedningarna), 2003
- Med hull och hår (with Leo Svensson and Göran "Freddy" Fredriksson, 2003
- Böndernas underverk / Farmer's Miracle (with Lennart Gybrandt), 2005
- Inga kônstigheter (with Blå Bergens Borduner), 2015
