= Moraharpa =

Musical instrument

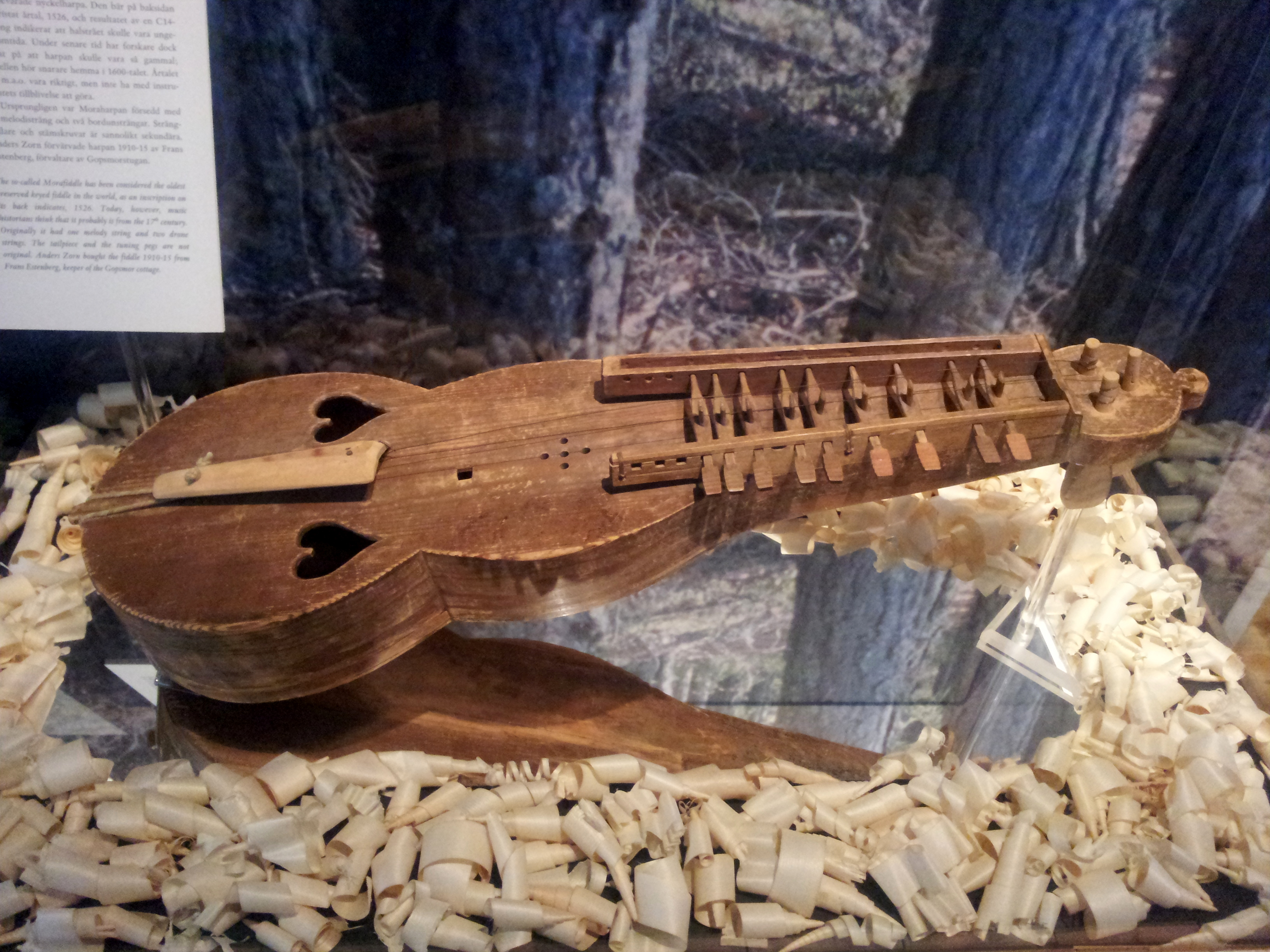
Moraharpa dated 1526 in the Zorn Collections, Mora Municipality, Sweden

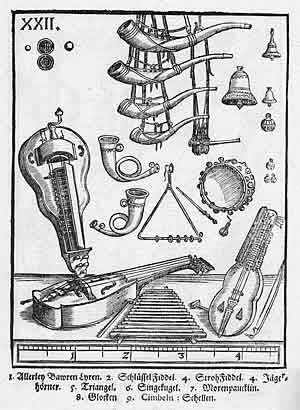
Schlüsselfiedel (lower right corner)

The moraharpa is a modern name for an early predecessor of the nyckelharpa keyed fiddle; the primary example instrument dated 1526, was found in Mora, Sweden. A number of modern reproductions of the original moraharpa have been made since the 1980s, and the name moraharpa, in addition to referring to a single, specific instrument, has come to mean a type of nyckelharpa similar in design to the original moraharpa.

== Museum example ==
The instrument on display at the Zorn Collections in the village of Mora in Dalarna, Sweden—hence its name—has an inscription on the back of the apparent year "1526", though it is unlikely to have been made that early. A Swedish scholar, Per-Ulf Allmo, has suggested that the instrument (and another in the same style) were likely built in Särna, northern Dalarna, more likely around 1680, with Praetorius as inspiration, and with no close affinity with the nyckelharpa tradition of northern Uppland, the stronghold of the instrument.

The soundbox has an hourglass shape and looks very much like the illustration of a nyckelharpa in Praetorius's Syntagma Musicum III of 1620 (where it is called Schlüssel fiddel). It has a straight bridge (as opposed to the arched, cello-like bridge of the nyckelharpa), one melody string, two drone strings, and one row of keys, while lacking the 10-12 underlying sympathetic strings of the nyckelharpa—which has three or four primary melody strings and features up to 25 wooden keys.
