= Väsen =

Swedish folk music band

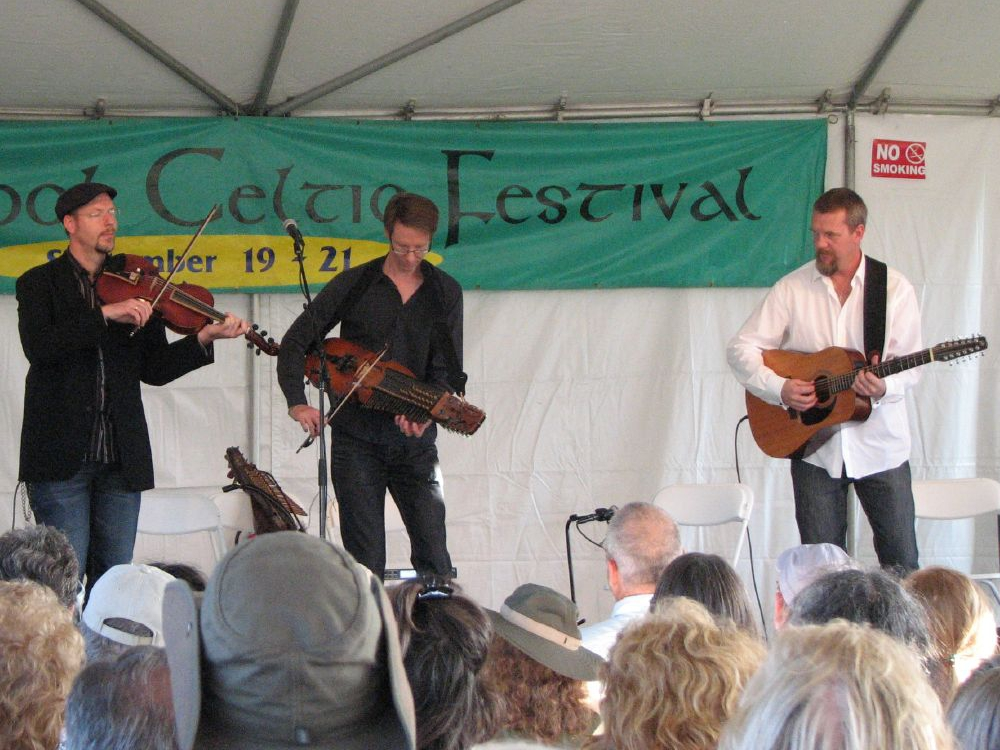
Väsen (without Ferrari) in Sebastopol (2008)

Väsen is a Swedish folk music band from Uppsala, founded in 1989, consisting of Olov Johansson (nyckelharpa) and Mikael Marin (viola). Previous members include André Ferrari (percussion) and founding member Roger Tallroth (guitar), the latter of whom announced his departure from the band in 2020 to focus on new projects. As of 2025 they have released 22 albums, featured on others, and have toured every year also outside of Europe. Since 2002, however, performances outside Sweden have tended to not include André Ferrari, owing to his reluctance to tour internationally and the economic advantage of a trio. Since then, Väsen has released eight albums (Trio, Keyed Up, Live in Japan, Väsen Street, Mindset, Live på Gamla Bion, Brewed, & Rule of 3) in this “strings-only” format.

The band played on Nordman's debut album in 1994. On the Finnish group JPP's album String Tease, they were guest artists on two of the tracks.

They also regularly play with the American musicians Mike Marshall (mandolin) and Darol Anger (violin).

== History ==
The band was founded in 1989.

== Members ==
- Olov Johansson (nyckelharpa)
- Mikael Marin (viola)
- André Ferrari (percussion; former)
- Roger Tallroth (guitar; former)

== Discography ==
- Väsen, 1990
- Vilda Väsen, 1992
- Essence, 1994
- Levande Väsen (Live), 1995
- Spirit, 1997 (Compilation: 15 tracks from the first four albums, plus 5 new tracks)
- Världens Väsen (Whirled), 1997
- Gront, 1999
- Live at the Nordic Roots Festival, 2001
- Trio, 2003
- Keyed Up, 2004
- Live in Japan, 2005
- Linnaeus Väsen, 2007
- Mike Marshall and Darol Anger with Väsen, 2007
- Väsen Street, 2009
- Mindset, 2013
- Live på Gamla Bion (CD + DVD), 2014
- Brewed, 2017
- Rule of 3, 2019
- Duo, 2021
- Melliken, 2023
- Väsen & Hawktail, 2024
- Vågor, 2025

== Featured performances ==
- Snarky Puppy Family Dinner – Volume 2, 2016 - “I Asked” feat. Becca Stevens (Track 1), “Be Still” feat. Becca Stevens (Track 9), “Shapons Vindaloo” (Track 11)
