= Roger Tallroth (musician) =

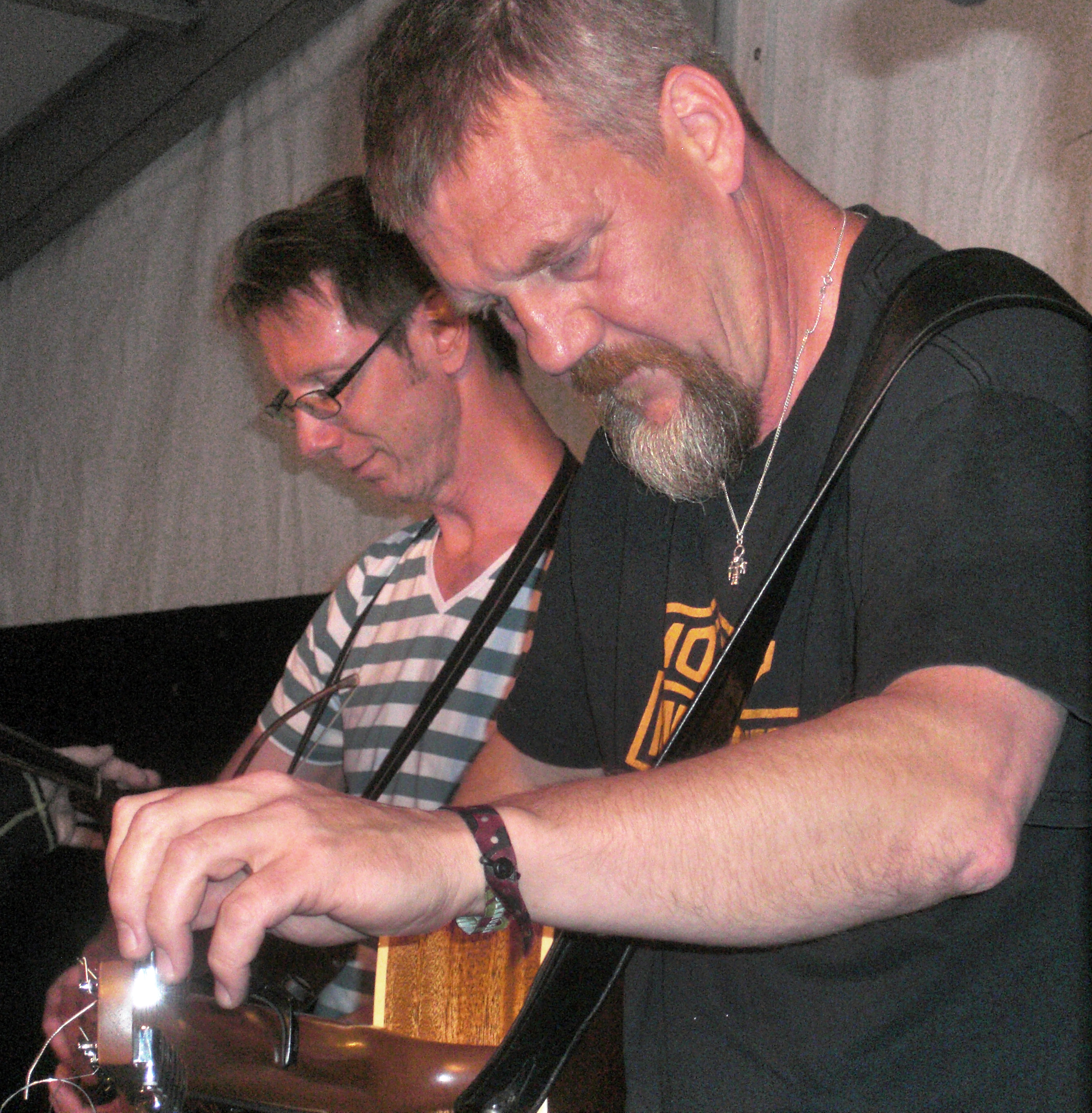
- Roger Tallroth tunes the guitar during a performance with the folk music group Väsen at Korrö folk music festival 2010.

Background information
- Born: Karl Johan Roger Tallroth; 1958 (age 67–68)
- Genres: Folk music
- Occupations: Musician, composer

Karl Johan Roger Tallroth, born in 1958, is a Swedish folk musician and composer, best known as a founder member of the band Väsen. He was educated at the Sjövik Folk High School and the School of Music in Örebro University. Principally a guitarist, he also plays other stringed instruments such as the bouzouki, ukulele, mandola, mandolin, fiddle, viola, oud and double bass. He also works as an arranger, and teaches at both the Royal College of Music in Stockholm and in Örebro University. Tallroth was a founding member of Väsen, however in 2020 he announced his departure from the band to focus on other projects.

In groups such as Väsen, Tallroth has created a personal playing style which often includes alternative tunings (especially A-D-A-D-A-D on the guitar) and distinct rhythmic patterns.

He has worked with musicians such as Annbjørg Lien and Sofia Karlsson, and collaborated on the theatrical production Hästen och tranan.

== Discography ==
=== With Väsen ===
- Väsen, 1990
- Vilda Väsen, 1992
- Essence, 1994
- Luke, 1994
- Tallroth, 1994
- Levande Väsen (Väsen Live), 1995
- Spirit, 1997
- Världens Väsen (Whirled), 1997
- Gront, 1999
- Live at the Nordic Roots Festival, 2001
- Trio, 2003
- Keyed Up, 2004
- Live in Japan, 2005
- Linnaeus Väsen, 2007
- Mike Marshall and Darol Anger with Väsen, 2007
- Väsen Street, 2009
- Mindset, 2013
- Live på Gamla Bion, 2014
- Väsen Brewed, 2017
- Rule of 3, 2019

=== With Annbjørg Lien ===
- Felefeber
- Prisme
- Baba Yaga
- Aliens Alive

=== Other ===
- Hästen och tranan
- Jul i folkton: I solvändets tid
- Jul i folkton
- Dreamers' Circus (EP) 2010 (with Dreamers' Circus)
- Sandum/Tallroth, 2023. With Øyvind sandum
