= Hedningarna =

Swedish-Finnish band

- Origin: Sweden; Finland
- Genre: Roots rock Folk rock Nordic rock Dark Folk; World music
- Years active: 1989–present
- Label: Silence Records
- Members: Hållbus Totte Mattson; Anders Norudde; Christian Svensson; Magnus Stinnerbom
- Past members: Björn Tollin; Anita Lehtola-Tollin; Liisa Matveinen; Sanna Kurki-Suonio; Tellu Paulasto (Virkkala, Turkka); Ulf Ivarsson

Hedningarna (The Heathens) is a Swedish, and for some years partly Finnish, folk rock band that mixes electronics and rock with elements from old Scandinavian folk music. Their music features yoik or juoiggus, a traditional Sami form of song.

== History ==
Hållbus Totte Mattson, Anders Stake and Björn Tollin formed Hedningarna in 1987. Hedning is Swedish for heathen, while ar is the plural suffix, and na is the definite article (thus hedningar 'heathens', hedningarna 'the heathens'). They wanted to go far back to the roots of the Old Norse culture, including the use of ancient instruments not much used in current Swedish folk music. Stake, a trained luthier, also began to invent and build new instruments, to produce new sounds.

In 1988, Hedningarna performed a major part of the music to the stage play Den stora vreden (roughly meaning The Great Wrath) which aroused great interest. Music arranger was Ale Möller. Their first album titled Hedningarna was released on Alice Records in 1989. In 1991, Hedningarna began their collaboration with Silence Records. They met the Finnish singers Sanna Kurki-Suonio and Tellu Paulasto. The album Kaksi! (Finnish for two) was released in September 1992. In 1993 Hedningarna was awarded a Swedish Grammis (the equivalent of Grammy) for The Best Folk Music Album of the year. The sales of Kaksi! reached 35,000 albums, which is very high for a folk music record in Sweden. British Sasha made a remix of Hedningarna's "Kruspolska" which climbed the charts in England.

The third album Trä, meaning 'wood' in Swedish (a pun, since "Trä" also sounds a lot like the Swedish word for "Three": tre) was released in September 1994. Melody Maker wrote "it may sound alien, but yet it sounds like the most essential music on the earth." Hedningarna performed at the Roskilde Festival in the presence of 20,000 people on the second largest stage. In 1995, Hedningarna toured Scandinavia and abroad. A compilation album with songs from Trä and Kaksi! was released in the United States. By 1995, their albums had been released in Spain, the Netherlands, Belgium, Poland, Thailand, Great Britain and the U.S.

The singers Kurki-Suonio and Paulasto stayed at home in Finland during 1996 for child birth and their studies. Paulasto decided to leave the band, and she was replaced by Anita Lehtola, who had been in the same class as Paulasto at The Sibelius Academy in Helsinki. Mattson, Stake and Tollin began work on their new album Hippjokk. Rock bassist Ulf Ivarsson played the new bass mandora built by Mattson. Finnish Sami yoik singer Wimme Saari participated with his singing and the Norwegian guitarist Knut Reiersrud had also a role in the album. Johan Liljemark played the didgeridoo, which he had learned in Australia while living among the Aboriginals. Hippjokk was released in February 1997. The band made tours and festival gigs with the singers in Spain and Belgium, and Ulf "Rockis" Ivarsson became a member of Hedningarna. Anders Stake changed his name to Anders Norudde.

During the winter of 1998, Hedningarna travelled to Karelia, Russia to gather inspiration for their new album, Karelia Visa. It was recorded during the spring and summer the same year. A short tour around Spain took place that summer. Ulf Ivarsson left the group after the recordings were finished. Mattson and Tollin together with the violin player Ola Bäckström recorded a CD with music for the dance troupe Virvla. It was released at Silence records in 1999. Sanna Kurki-Suonio released a solo album in Finland the same year. Karelia Visa was released in 1999, and it was followed by concerts in Scandinavia and a three-week tour in the USA.

Hedningarna played live to a dance performance based on their music, made and performed by Flying Foot Forum in Minneapolis, USA. The violin player Magnus Stinnerbom joined the group. In 2000, Norudde released a solo album and the percussionist Christian Svensson joined the group, replacing founding member Björn Tollin. By then, even Kurki-Suonio and Lehtola had left the ranks. Tellu Paulasto now known as Tellu Virkkala returned while taking with her Finnish compatriot Liisa Matveinen as a new member. With this line-up the band toured and recorded a couple of new tracks of which two can be found on the compilation CD 1989–2003, released in 2003. By then, Hedningarna had sold about 150,000 records. The singers left the group in 2003, and the following years the group kept a low profile, doing occasional gigs only. In 2009, the band announced on their homepage that they were working on material for a new studio album, as a trio with singer and fiddle player Samuel Andersson joining founding members Mattsson and Norudde.

In 2011, a remixed version of "Vargtimmen" ("Hour of the Wolf") from Trä was used in the trailer of the video game The Witcher 2. At the beginning of 2012, the year of 25th anniversary of the band, Hedningarna announced the première of new CD called &, released April 2012. The album contained some strong political overtones and featured a collaboration with cult group Philemon Arthur and the Dung. In 2016, an album with previously unreleased recordings from 1992 to 2003 was announced, called Kult.

== Members ==
=== Current ===
- Hållbus Totte Mattson – mandora, lute, baroque guitar, moraoud, hurdy-gurdy, accordion, hummel, Swedish dulcimer, vocals.
- Anders Norudde (formerly known as Anders Stake) – fiddle, hardanger fiddle, moraharpa, bass moraharpa, nyckelharpa, bowed harp, Swedish bagpipes, flute, willow flute, jaw harp, buckhorn, vocals.
- Samuel Andersson, fiddle, percussion drone, vocals

=== Past ===
- Björn Tollin – tambourine, percussion, hummel, bass mandora, saw, frame drum, string drum, hurdy-gurdy, moraharpa, sampling, vocals.
- Anita Lehtola-Tollin – vocals.
- Liisa Matveinen – vocals.
- Sanna Kurki-Suonio – vocals, kantele, bass drum.
- Tellu Paulasto (Virkkala, Turkka) – vocals, fiddle, bass moraharpa.
- Ulf Ivarsson – bass guitar, bass-lute, bass mandora, sampling.
- Christian Svensson – tambourine, percussion, hummel, sampling.
- Magnus Stinnerbom – Octave Violin, viola, hurdy-gurdy.

== Guest musicians ==
- Wimme Saari – Yoik vocals on Trä and Hippjokk.
- Knut Reiersrud – electric guitar, vocals on Hippjokk.
- Johan Liljemark – didgeridoo on Hippjokk and Karelia Visa.
- Ola Bäckström – fiddle on Hippjokk.
- Per-Erik Nilsson – percussion on Kaksi.

== Discography ==
- Hedningarna (1989)
- Kaksi! (1992)
- Trä (1994)
- Kruspolska SASHA mixes (1994)
- The Heathens Fire (1996) (Includes tracks from Kaksi & Trä)
- Hippjokk (1997)
- Karelia Visa (1999)
- 1989–2003 (2003)
- & (2012)
- Kult (2016)

== Additional appearances ==
- Beginner's Guide to Scandinavia, 3CD compilation (Nascente, 2011)
- Werewolf Songs − Music Inspired by Swedish Folklore, compilation CD (Malört förlag, 2012)
