= Chloe Smith (musician) =

American musician and activist

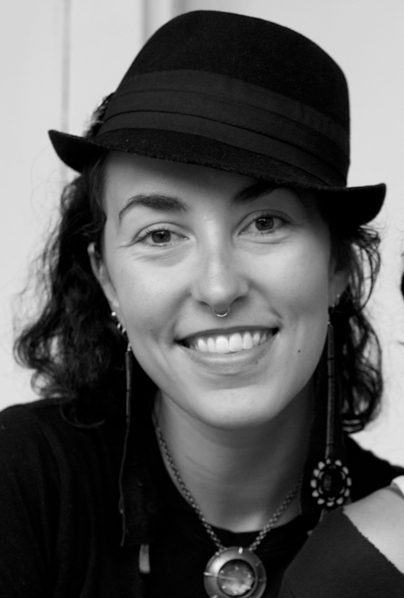
- Chloe Smith in 2010 in New Orleans

Background information
- Born: Atlanta, Georgia, U.S.
- Origin: New Orleans, Louisiana, U.S.
- Genres: Appalachian folk Roots music Southern soul World music
- Occupations: Singer, musician
- Instruments: Vocals, banjo, fiddle, guitar
- Years active: 2006–present
- Label: Independent
- Member of: Rising Appalachia; Starling Arrow

Chloe Smith is an American singer, multi-instrumental musician, and activist, known for her role as one of the two lead vocalists of Rising Appalachia alongside her older sister Leah Song. Her music, which incorporates sultry vocals, rhythm, banjo, guitar, and fiddle, is based in the traditions of Southern soul and international roots music.

Smith has an interest in natural medicine and healing and engages in social activism, where she is involved in issues pertaining to the environment, racial inequality and cultural appropriation.

== Early life and education ==
Chloe Smith was born and grew up in Atlanta, Georgia in an artistic family. Her father, Andrew Hunter Smith, is a folk-sculptor and painter. Her mother, Jan Smith, is a jazz pianist and folk musician schooled in the traditions of southern Appalachian folk music who played fiddle with the Rosin Sisters.

Smith's musical education was nurtured by her mother, who ensured that both sisters received classical and jazz piano training for the most of their upbringing. Smith's mother also guided their training in vocals and harmony singing. Banjo, fiddle and guitar came later, after the sisters had left home and moved to Asheville, North Carolina.

Smith graduated from Henry W. Grady High School. She found high school to be a positive experience which made her more aware of the wide range of racial, financial and cultural diversity in the world. After graduation, Smith traveled for a year, returning when she felt she had spent too much time away from her sister Leah, who was traveling independently.

== Activism ==
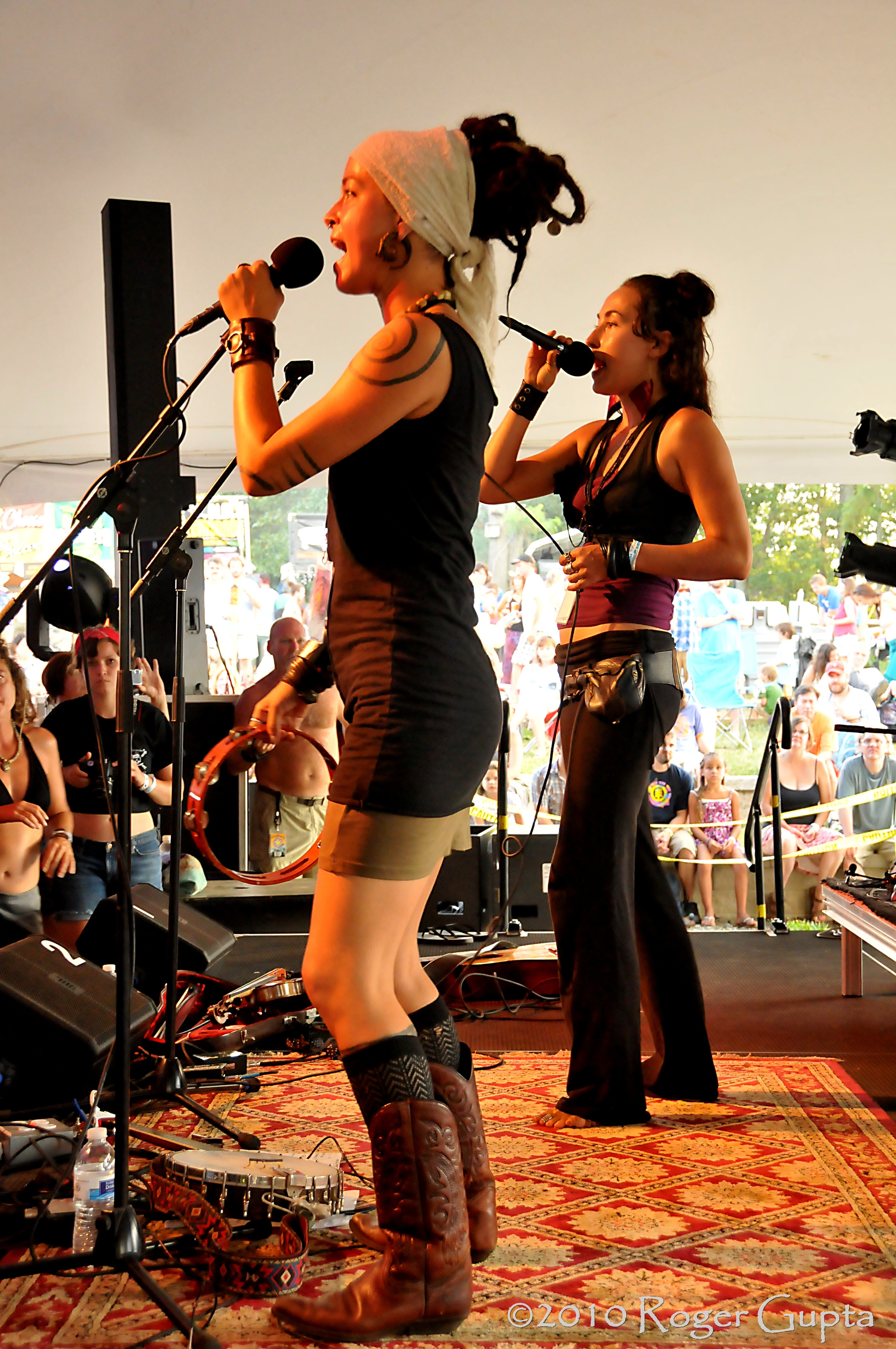
Rising Appalachia at FloydFest 9 in July 2010

Smith's environmental activism like her music is rooted in her childhood. In an interview, speaking about the Appalachian fiddle camps and dances festivals her parents took her to as a child, she said:

[A] huge imprint and memory of my childhood was running around those camps with Leah, dancing in the old gyms and barns and also being wild out in nature, free-roaming with the cicadas and lizards while the adults were playing tunes all night. West Virginia has always been a favorite, which is why we are as invested as we can be in working with the anti-fracking and anti-mountaintop-removal folks there.

An activist before she became a musician, she credits her father with inspiring her desire to combine art with activism in a spiritual way, saying:

[O]ur father brought to our attention from day one: art for art’s sake is lovely, but there is something more pressing and all-encompassing about the folks who speak to the bigger picture. Our 'human experience,' our spiritual and social, need to lean on each other, find support systems and ways to rally for a higher purpose.

Smith supports other causes in addition to environmental ones. She is particularly concerned about environmental destruction, racial inequality, and cultural appropriation, and Rising Appalachia has sung in support of the Occupy movement.

== Musical career ==
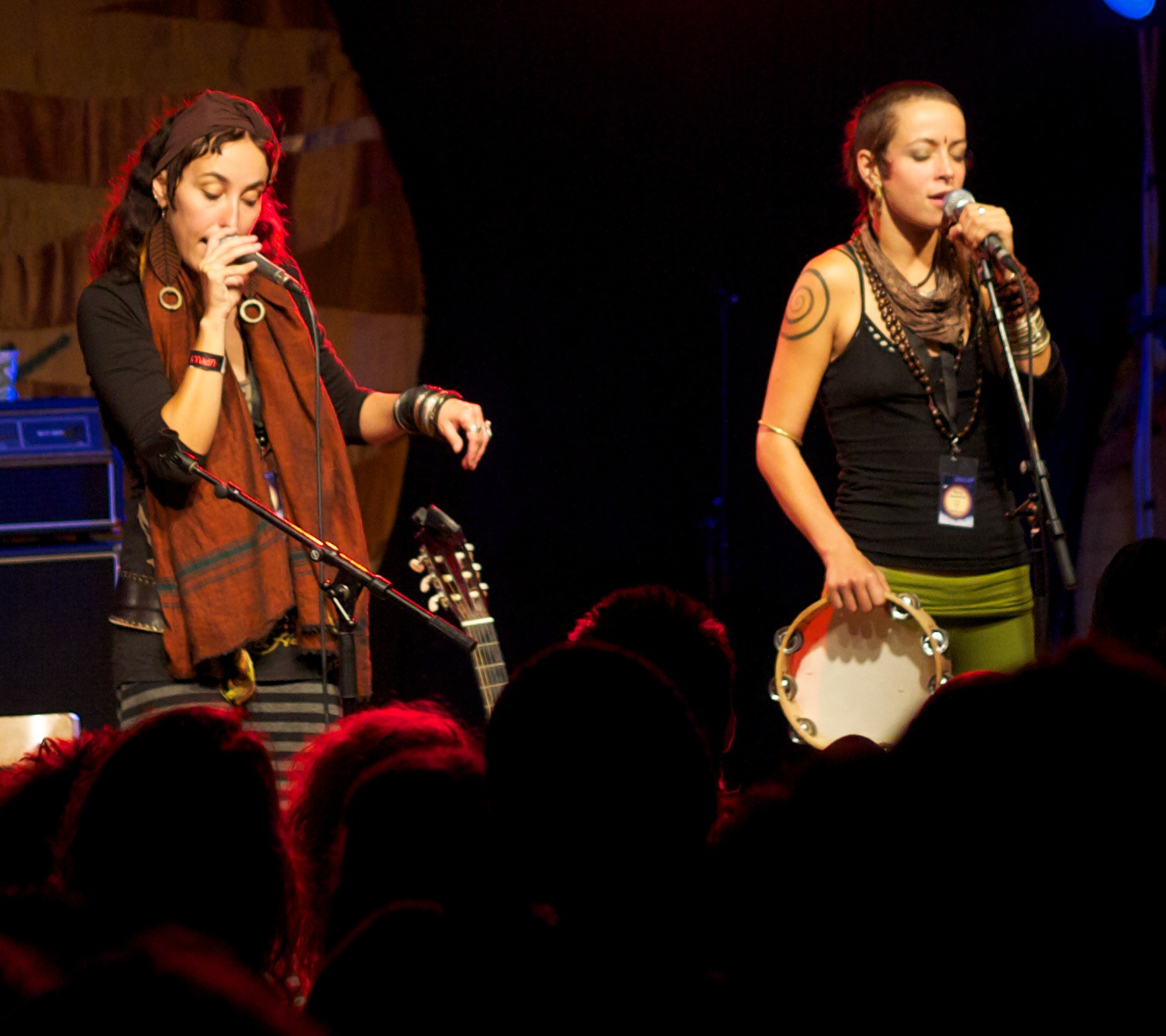
Rising Appalachia duo at the Urkult 2011 festival in Sweden

In 2005, Smith, together with her sister Leah, decided to record their first album, Leah and Chloe, one afternoon in the basement studio of a friend. The album was meant as a gift for family and friends but they received so much support and recognition for it that they decided to officially start a band called Rising Appalachia. Smith said of the experience:

The response was ferocious. We were brought in to the big concert hall at Emory University and asked to represent the voice of the young Southern music influence. That night, we almost sold out of the entire [batch] of albums we’d made.

In the early days, the sisters busked in the French Quarter of New Orleans and elsewhere. They began to find their own natural interpretation of Appalachian music which brought together folk, soul, hip-hop, classical, southern gospel and other styles based on their upbringing on traditional Appalachian string band music, as well as on their exposure to urban music like hip-hop and jazz and the influence of roots music of all kinds which they experienced during their worldwide travels.

The sisters integrate live performance art into Rising Appalachia's shows. Speaking about this, Smith said:

[It] stems from our deep love and appreciation for the collaborative role we play as artists. Our stage is our tool to fully express who we are and what we live for, and a huge part of that is community building. We want our concerts to be a full experience — aural, visual, magical and fully integrating the idea of art as a lifestyle and not just a show.

== Natural medicine and healing ==
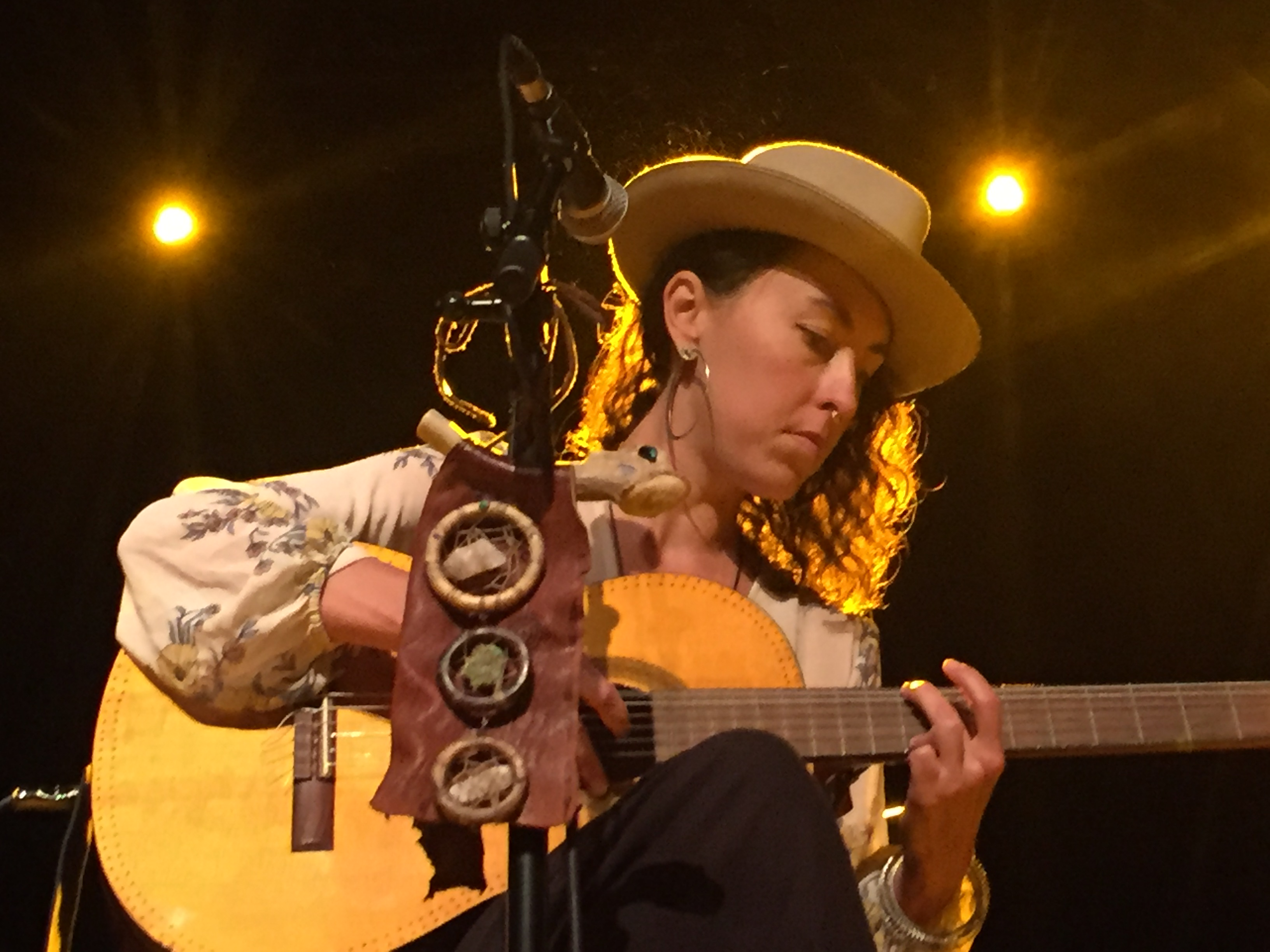
Chloe Smith, Resilient Tour, Atlanta, 2018

Smith's interest in natural medicine and healing inspired the song "Medicine," released on Rising Applachia's 2015 album, Wider Circles. Speaking about the song in an interview, she said that the song "draws attention to the natural medicine and natural healing that we’ve experienced over the years," and "there is a new under layer of messaging of using these tools in nature that we have around us to heal ourselves and reconnect to the world we are living in."

== Selected discography ==
=== With Rising Appalachia ===
- Rising Appalachia (2006). Leah and Chloe (CD). CD Baby/Rising Appalachia.
- Rising Appalachia (2007). Scale Down (CD). CD Baby/Unwound.
- R.I.S.E. (Rising Appalachia) (2008). Evolutions in Sound: Live (CD). CD Baby/R.I.S.E. (Rising Appalachia).
- Rising Appalachia (2010). The Sails of Self (CD). CD Baby/Rising Appalachia.
- Rising Appalachia (2012). Filthy Dirty South (CD). CD Baby/Rising Appalachia.
- Rising Appalachia (2015). Wider Circles (CD). Rising Appalachia.
- Rising Appalachia (2017). Alive (CD). Rising Appalachia. (live album)
- Rising Appalachia (2019). Leylines (CD). Rising Appalachia.
- Rising Appalachia (2021). The Lost Mystique of Being in the Know (CD). Rising Appalachia.
- Rising Appalachia (2024). Folk and Anchor (CD). Rising Appalachia.

=== Music videos (Rising Appalachia and other collaborations) ===
- The Rosin Sisters; Chloe Smith (2010). Africa (video). Ann Whitley.
- Chloe Smith (2011). Trouble In Mind (video). With Scott McKibben. Eye of the Crow.
- Rising Appalachia (July 27, 2013). Occupy (video). With Nakho Bear. FloydFest.
- Rising Appalachia (2015a). Medicine (video). Jeremy Jensen Media.

== See also ==
- Appalachian Center for Wilderness Medicine
- Environmental issues in Appalachia
- Environmental justice and coal mining in Appalachia
- Social and economic stratification in Appalachia
