= Leah Song =

American singer-songwriter and activist

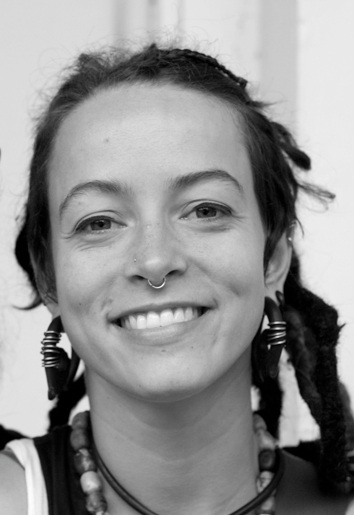
- Leah Song in 2010 in New Orleans.

Background information
- Born: Leah Smith; Atlanta, Georgia, USA
- Origin: New Orleans, Louisiana, USA
- Genres: Appalachian folk Roots music Southern soul World music
- Occupation: Singer-songwriter
- Instrument(s): Vocals, banjo, fiddle, guitar
- Years active: 2006–present
- Labels: Independent
- Member of: Rising Appalachia; Starling Arrow

Leah Song (born Leah Smith) is an American singer-songwriter, multi-instrumental musician, storyteller, poet, artist, and activist known for her role as one of the two frontsisters of Rising Appalachia — with younger sister Chloe Smith — incorporating sultry vocals, rhythm, banjo, guitar, ballads, dance, spoken-word and storytelling into her work. Her music is based in the traditions of Southern soul and international roots music.

Song engages in social activism and is involved with environment, food justice, human rights and criminal justice and prison reform. She has been a speaker at TEDx in Asheville, North Carolina.

== Early life and education ==
Leah Smith was born and grew up in Atlanta, Georgia into an artistic family. Her father, Andrew Hunter Smith, is a folk-sculptor and painter. Her mother, Jan Smith, is a jazz pianist and folk musician schooled in the traditions of southern Appalachian folk music who played fiddle with the Rosin Sisters.

Her musical education was nurtured by her mother, who ensured that both sisters received classical and jazz piano training for most of their upbringing. Smith's mother also guided their training in vocals and harmony singing. Banjo, fiddle and guitar came later, after the sisters had left home and moved to Asheville, North Carolina.

She graduated from Henry W. Grady High School where she was involved in political activism.

== Travels ==
Determined to pursue an experiential form of education, at 19 Song moved to Mexico, where she became involved with the Zapatista movement. In a 2014 interview, she said of the experience,

I was working with the Zapatista movement and just living in and amongst the communities of southern Mexico that were working with indigenous struggle. When I moved down there I became a student of that community. I lived there for almost a year teaching and learning. I then went on to spend the next 5 years of my life traveling and living abroad in that context. I went from place to place to study and live within a community and truly be a community member. I really tried to be invested in the places I traveled to and learn from them.

== Activism ==
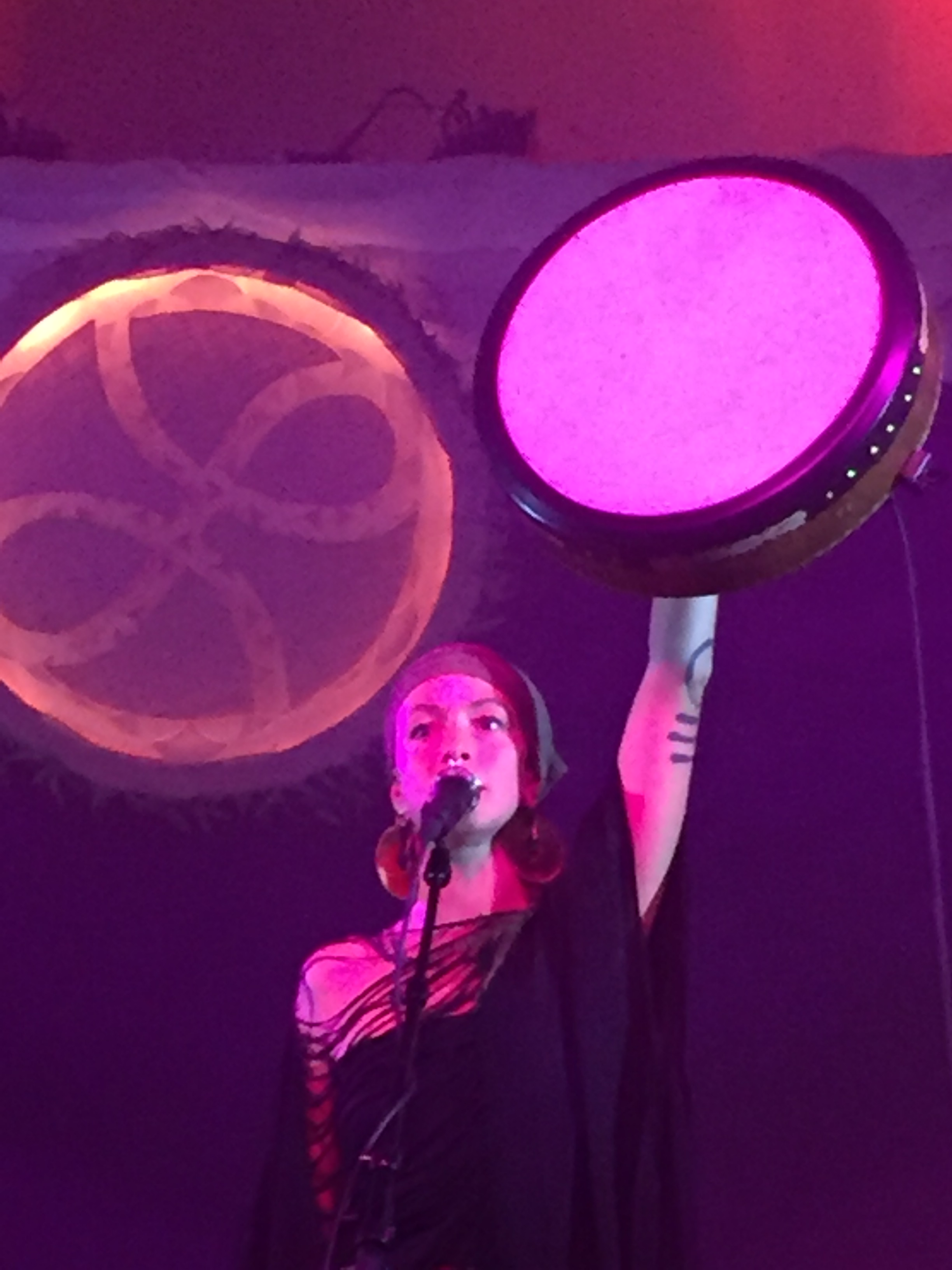
Leah Song at LEAF, May 11, 2018

Song is an activist who is concerned with homeless youth education as well as indigenous rights She was an activist before she became a musician. In a 2019 interview, Song said,

The whole band was involved in activism before we were involved in performance. So it was a natural swing for us. I was doing a lot of work around indigenous communities. I spent a lot of time in Southern Mexico studying the Zapatista Movement and learning about art as a tool for social justice.

Asked about indigenous rights and cultural appropriation, in the same interview Song said,

Yeah, totally. I think there’s a lot of conversation around roots and culture and indigenous rights and cultural appropriation and the incredibly complex and painful pieces of all of that. I think, from my work in indigenous justice and as an ally, and also in studying my own ancestry, so often what is wanted and needed is for people to know who they are and know where they come from. And from there you really can stand up and be an ally and in partnership with all kinds of different historical backgrounds and different movements.

Song is also involved in the environmental activism of the Appalachian Mountains and Gulf Coast regions. She is also involved with food justice, human rights activism, and prison activism. She works with prison programs which cultivate emotional release through the arts around the United States.

Rising Appalachia has sung in support of the Occupy movement.

== Musical career ==
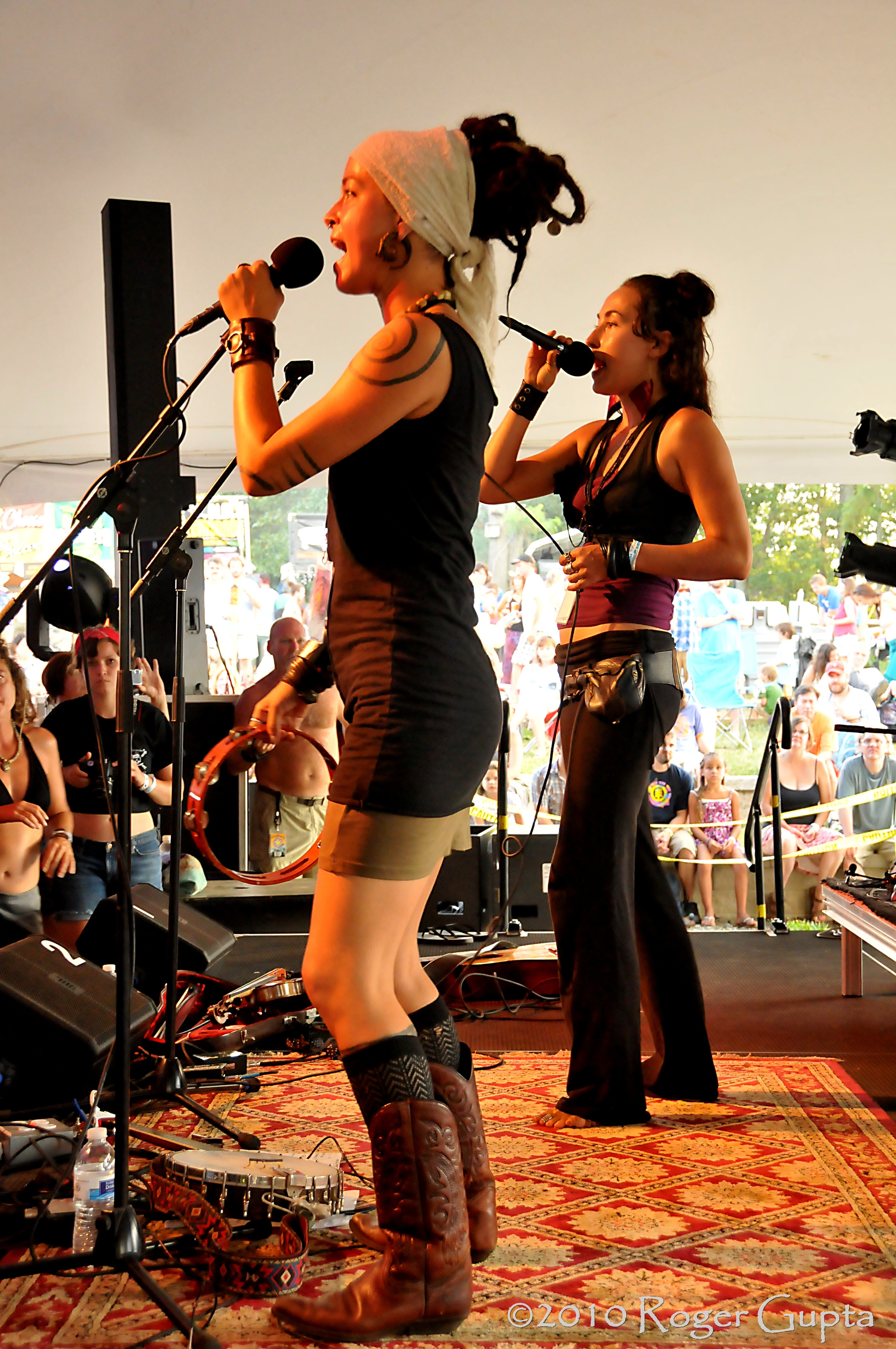
Rising Appalachia at FloydFest 9 in July 2010

Song and her sister Chloe decided to record their first album, Leah and Chloe (2006), one afternoon in the basement studio of a friend in downtown Atlanta, Georgia. The album was meant as a gift for family and friends but they received so much support and recognition for it that they decided to officially start a band called Rising Appalachia.

In the early days, the sisters busked in the French Quarter of New Orleans and elsewhere. They began to find their own natural interpretation of Appalachian music which brought together folk, soul, hip-hop, classical, southern gospel and other styles based on their upbringing on traditional Appalachian string band music, as well as on their exposure to urban music like hip-hop and jazz and the influence of roots music of all kinds which they experienced during their worldwide travels.

Song's spoken-word poetry is a driving influence behind Rising Appalachia's music. Her background in movement arts has inspired her to cultivate a relationship with the global circus arts and street theater communities.

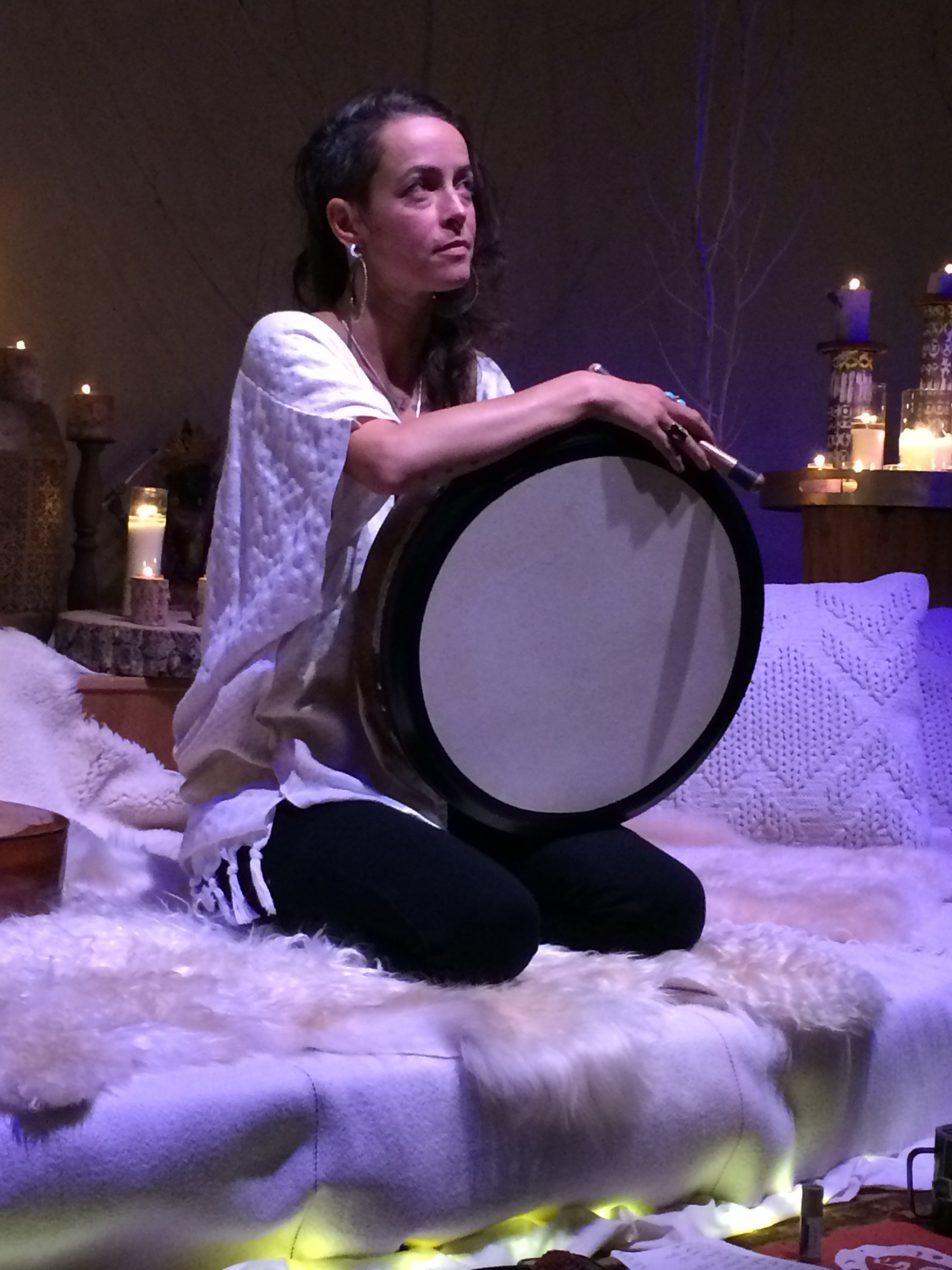
Leah Song performing with bodhrán, December 8, 2019

=== Slow Music Movement and the Wider Circles Rail Tour ===
Song coined the term "Slow Music Movement" while preparing for a TedX talk. During Rising Appalachia's Wider Circles Rail Tour, the band travelled by Amtrak train. Song connected this with the "Slow Music Movement", which she described as exploring the question as to how music can be a public service, saying:

We want to have relationships with the farmers and the food of each region and also to have a relationship with different educational initiatives and non-profits. We have a policy that at each show at least two non-profits are welcome, invited — non-profits or educational initiatives, arts justice projects — to the show to set up tables and let the audiences know, as well as ourselves, what's going on locally.

== Selected discography ==
=== With Rising Appalachia ===
- Rising Appalachia (2006). Leah and Chloe (CD). CD Baby/Rising Appalachia.
- Rising Appalachia (2007). Scale Down (CD). CD Baby/Unwound.
- R.I.S.E. (Rising Appalachia) (2008). Evolutions in Sound: Live (CD). CD Baby/R.I.S.E. (Rising Appalachia).
- Rising Appalachia (2010). The Sails of Self (CD). CD Baby/Rising Appalachia.
- Rising Appalachia (2012). Filthy Dirty South (CD). CD Baby/Rising Appalachia.
- Rising Appalachia (2015). Wider Circles (CD). Rising Appalachia.
- Rising Appalachia (2017). Alive (CD). Rising Appalachia. (live album)
- Rising Appalachia (2019). Leylines (CD). Rising Appalachia.
- Rising Appalachia (2021). The Lost Mystique of Being in the Know (CD). Rising Appalachia.

=== Independent music videos ===
- Leah Song (2011). Lagrimas Negras (video). By Miguel Matamoros. Chad Hess Production.
- Leah Song (2012a). Lagrimas Negras (version 2) (video). By Miguel Matamoros. Chad Hess Production.
- Leah Song (2012b). Love Stays (video). Directed by Chad Hess. Chad Hess Production.
- Leah Song (2013a). Caminando: Live (video). Chad Hess Production.
- Leah Song (2013b). Thank You Very Much (video). Leah Song Music.

=== Collaborative music videos ===
- Leah Song (2014a). Beautiful Cypher Jam Session (video). With Biko Casini, Climbing PoeTree, Elijah+ and Band of Light. Kauai: Kamana Media.
- Leah Song (2014b). Spirit's Cradle (video). With Climbing PoeTree (poetics), Biko Casini (percussion). Vincent Wilson.
- Rising Appalachia (July 27, 2013). Occupy (video). With Nakho Bear. FloydFest.
- Leah Song; Quetzal Jordan (January 13, 2018). Quiet for the Lull (video). AVL Plays Well With Others.

=== Interviews and talks ===
- Guildner, Kami. "Leah Song: Singer and Songwriter of Rising Appalachia". Extraordinary Women Radio (podcast). Episode 089.
- Leah Song (2015a). Leah Song at the St. Augustine Symposium (video). Hosted by Micah Gilliam. The St. Augustine Symposium.
- Leah Song (2015b). What is the slow music movement? (video). TEDxAsheville.

== See also ==
- Environmental issues in Appalachia
- Environmental justice and coal mining in Appalachia
- Social and economic stratification in Appalachia
- Songlines
