= Soon I Will Be Done =

Traditional African-American spiritual song

"Soon I Will Be Done (With the Troubles of the World)" is a traditional African-American spiritual.

== Recordings ==
A notable arrangement was created by Edward Boatner (1898–1981).

The song has been recorded by:

- Mahalia Jackson. The song was famously associated with her, notably in the soundtrack of Imitation of Life (1959 film), although in the LP issued in connection with the film it is sung by Lillian Hayman.
- Carla Bley and Steve Swallow. It appears on their 1988 album, Duets.
- Frankie Knuckles. It appears on his 1991 album, Beyond The Mix.
- Liz McComb. It appears on her 1992 album, Acoustic Woman.
- The Acappella Company. It appears on their 1993 album, Spirituals.
- The Howard Roberts Chorale. It appears on the David Crowder Band’s 2005 album, A Collision or (3+4=7).

Rising Appalachia based their 2012 song "Occupy" on "Soon I Will Be Done." It first appeared on their 2012 album, Filthy Dirty South. A live version appears on their 2017 album, Alive.
