= The Bisserov Sisters =

Bulgarian folk musical trio

- Origin: Pirin, Bulgaria
- Genres: Folk
- Years active: 1978-present

The Bisserov Sisters are a Bulgarian musical trio that performs folk songs mainly from the Pirin folklore area. They were born in the village of Pirin, Sandanski Municipality, Blagoevgrad Province.

== Career ==
Sisters Lyubimka, Neda and Mitra made their official debut in 1978 at the XI World Festival in Cuba, where they won first prize in the competition.

From 1978 onwards, the Bissarov Sisters began active concert activities in Bulgaria and around the world. Their first album was released in 1978, recorded in the recording studio Balkanton.

In 1980, Lyubimka and Mitra were accepted through a competition at the Philip Kutev State Pedagogical University, personally selected by its founder Philip Kutev. At the same time, Neda sang in the ensemble "Gotse Delchev", and later joined the DANPT.

In 1996, the Bissarov Sisters officially expanded the trio to include their children in stage performances. They made their first official debut as a family band in Copenhagen, Denmark. Then Vera and Rositsa, daughters of Mitra Biserova, joined the family band. Lyubimka's sons - Rosen and Manol - are musicians and actively take part in the concert activities of the trio.

In 1998 they were awarded the Silver Lyre by the Union of Bulgarian Musicians and Dancers (Bulgarian initialism "SBMTD") on the occasion of 20 years of the Bisserov Sisters. The Vice President of the Republic of Bulgaria, Todor Kavaldjiev, greeted them with a telegram during their anniversary concert.

In 2003 they also received the Golden Lyre Award from SBMTD on the occasion of 25 years of stage performances.

== Notable covers ==
The song "Zevedi Me Jalino" was covered by Rising Appalachia on their 2012 album, Filthy Dirty South, as "Zevedi Me Lalino."

== Selected discography ==
- The Bisserov Sisters (1978). The Pirin Mountain Folk Songs (LP). Balkanton. BHA 10334.
- The Bisserov Sisters (1986). Folk Songs From Pirin (LP). Balkanton. BHA 11862.
- The Bisserov Sisters Folk Trio (1990). Nothing Left To Do (CD). Balkanton. 070080.
- The Bisserov Sisters (1990). Music From The Pirin Mountains (CD). PAN Records. PAN 133 CD.
- The Bisserov Sisters (1995). Pirin Wedding And Ritual Songs (CD). PAN Records. PAN 7005CD.
- The Bisserov Sisters (2000). Three Generations (CD). PAN Records. PAN 2080.

=== Collaborations ===
Trakiiskata Troika

- The Bisserov Sisters; Trakiiskata Troika [in Bulgarian] (1986). The Bisserov Sisters [and] Trakiiskata Troika (LP). Balkanton. BHA 11383.
- The Bisserov Sisters; Nadka Karadjova (1992). Bulgarian Polyphony (CD). Vol. III. Tokyo: JVC. VICG-5223.

=== With family ===
- The Bisserov Sisters and Family (2003). 25 Years (CD). VVD Ruychev.
- The Bisserov Sisters and Family (2013). Macedonian Music For Dances And Parties (CD).
- The Bisserov Sisters and Family (2015). Songs For The Pirin Girls (CD).
