= Bright Morning Star =

Traditional Appalachian spiritual

"Bright Morning Star" is a traditional Appalachian spiritual, that has been sung by numerous folk artists, and was popularized in the folk revivals of the 1960s and 70s, particularly by The Young Tradition.

The song was first recorded/collected by Alan and Elizabeth Lomax in Harlan County, Kentucky in 1937 as sung by G. D. Vowell, under the title "Bright Moving Stars are Rising".

Peggy Seeger, with her sisters Penny & Barbara included the song on their 1957 album, American Folk Songs for Christmas, on Scholastic Records SC 7553.

The songs are performed from a book of the same name, published by their mother, Ruth Crawford Seeger, (Doubleday & Co., 1953). The book cites the Archive of American Folksong at the Library of Congress, with the identifier "1379 A1."

…the words of this song are typical of the shape-note hymn, especially in the apostrophe of the ancestors (father, mother, and so forth), but the original singer probably delivered his own particular version which throws the ordinary strict-tempo melody into an alternation of 5/4 – 4/4 – 3/4 measures. (from the Archive of American Folksong in the Library of Congress, Washington, D.C.)

References to the Morning Star were common in the 19th century, as can be seen in Edward Billups's 1854 book The Sweet Songster, a Baptist hymnal from Kentucky.

== Recordings ==
The song has been recorded by The Pennywhistlers on their 1965 album, A Cool Day and Crooked Corn; by The Young Tradition, live, included on the 1970 compilation album, The Folk Trailer (Trailer LER 2019); by Emmylou Harris on her 1987 album Angel Band; by The Wailin' Jennys on their 2011 album, Bright Morning Stars;, by the Northern Irish folk singer Cara Dillon on her 2014 album A Thousand Hearts; by Rising Appalachia, who adapt it in their medley "Bright Morning Stars / Bokawak" on their 2015 album, Wider Circles; by Mountain Man on their 2018 album Magic Ship; and by Bonny Light Horseman on their 2020 album Bonny Light Horseman.

== Source attribution ==
- "Bright Morning Star". The Longest Song. This article incorporates text from this source, which is available under the CC BY-SA 3.0 license.
