= Starling Arrow =

American a cappella spirit-folk ensemble

- Genres: A cappella, folk
- Years active: 2020–present
- Members: Tina Malia; Ayla Nereo; Chloe Smith; Leah Song; Marya Stark
- Website: starlingarrow.com

Starling Arrow is an American a cappella spirit-folk ensemble formed in 2020 by Leah Song and Chloe Smith (of Rising Appalachia), Tina Malia, Ayla Nereo, and Marya Stark.

== History ==
Murmuration of common starlings at Newport Wetlands Nature Reserve, Wales

The ensemble was conceived and formed during the pandemic lockdown of 2020, meeting via Zoom. The group explains the original of its name as follows:

Starling Arrow was born after learning more about the starling, an iridescent songbird known for its cooperation with its fellow birds to create beautiful murmuration patterns in the sky. Arrow speaks to the aim all 5 artists have together as songbirds, to create a song from collaborative inspiration and have it land in a place of unique beauty. Starling Arrow is meant to convey "The song sent with aim from the bow of the muse."

The group gave their debut performance at the Hawk and Hawthorne in Barnardsville, North Carolina in July 2022.

The ensemble released its first single, "Wild Sweet", written by Ayla Nereo, in October 2022. The song received a positive review from Ear to the Ground. A second single, "Into the River", written by Chloe Smith, was released in November 2022. Randy Radic, writing for Guitar Girl, described the song as "brilliant".

The ensemble released its third single, "By the Jordan", written by Tina Malia, in December 2022. A fourth single, "Fly Away", written by Marya Stark, was released in January 2023, as was a fifth single, "Oh Darlin'", written by Leah Song.

The group released their first album, Cradle, on February 16, 2023, produced and engineered by Tina Malia.

== Discography ==
=== Albums ===
- Cradle (February 16, 2023)

=== Singles ===
- "Wild Sweet" (October 7, 2022)
- "Into the River" (November 4, 2022)
- "By the Jordan" (December 2, 2022)
- "Fly Away" (January 6, 2023)
- "Oh Darlin'" (January 27, 2023)

=== Videos ===
- Starling Arrow (October 2022). Wild Sweet (video).
- Starling Arrow (November 2022). Into the River (video).
- Starling Arrow (December 2022). By the Jordan (video).
- Starling Arrow (January 2023). Fly Away (video).
- Starling Arrow (January 2023). Oh Darlin' (video).

== See also ==
- Language of the birds – Mythical communication of divine knowledge through birds to humans
