= Permaculture Action Network =

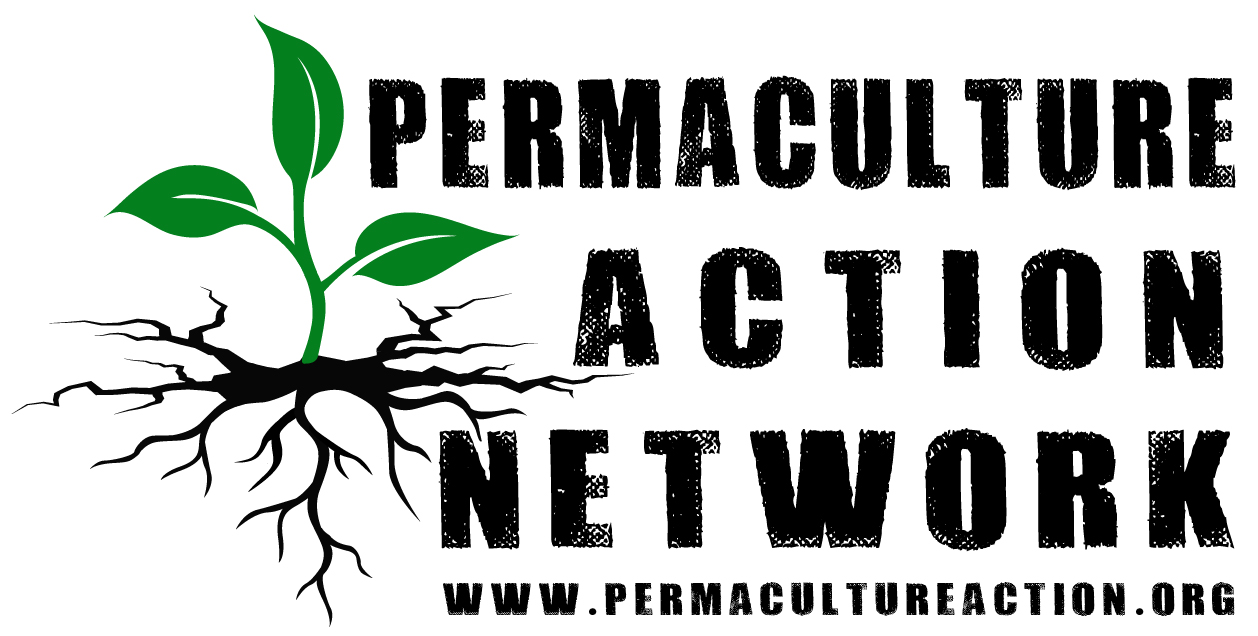

Permaculture Action Network is an organization that mobilizes concert-goers and festival-attendees to come out to "Permaculture Action Days," one day events where participants take direct action to build permaculture systems in the cities where they live. Past projects that the Permaculture Action Network has implemented include urban farms, community gardens, public food forests, earthen structures, rainwater catchment systems, greenhouses, and school orchards.

== Mission statement ==
Permaculture Action Network empowers people to take action to create the world they want to see by connecting educators, creators, and organizers with broad and diverse audiences to build a regenerative and just world. From organizing Permaculture Action Days and events to building educational spaces and hosting courses, Permaculture Action Network is committed to pushing community and environmental sustainability to the center of society’s cultural narrative.

== History ==
In the Fall of 2014, the collective launched Pushing Through The Pavement: A Permaculture Action Tour with electronic music producer The Polish Ambassador, folk singer Ayla Nereo and hip-hop MC Mr. Lif. During the six-week tour they brought local organizations on stage and inspired thousands of people to participate in Permaculture Action Days after every single show in over 32 cities across the country. Cities they visited include San Diego, Seattle, Boston, Orlando, Portland, and New York City. At each of these Permaculture Action Days they planted public food forests, built community gardens, and completed diverse other projects that connected people to urban farms, ecological common spaces, and one another, often mobilizing up to 400 people at a time.

The tour was such a success the collective went on to organize a dozen more Permaculture Action Days before festivals and after shows in major cities, coordinate Permaculture Action Hubs (educational spaces within larger events), and teach three Permaculture Action Courses on ecological design, community organizing, and social change. Festivals the organization has worked with include Envision Festival, Lucidity Festival, Symbiosis, Lightning in a Bottle, Summer Camp Music Festival, and Joshua Tree Music Festival.

In 2016, the organization began to work with music group Rising Appalachia to put on Permaculture Action Days at their shows including in New Orleans during Jazz Fest, before their first ever Red Rocks performance, and before their performance at Summer Camp Music Festival.

== Permaculture Action Day ==
Permaculture Action Day is a one-day event that brings together folks from a particular bioregion, neighborhood, school, or cultural audience to create ecological common spaces together – places that help to facilitate the movement towards sustainable living between people and planet. These days both put the hands of its attendees to work directly implementing these systems – such as forest gardens, greenhouses, and rainwater catchment systems – as well as teaching the design process and skills that go into bringing these systems about. Permaculture Action Days weave in workshops and skill-shares, music, shared meals, and other dynamic activities that build relationships between participants that last beyond the day itself, and lead to many more opportunities for community building and ecological revitalization.
