= Cripple Creek (folk song) =

American traditional folk song

Song
- Published: Mid 19th Century
- Genre: Folk; bluegrass
- Songwriter: Traditional

Cripple Creek, performed by Gid Tanner and his Skillet Lickers (1929)

"Cripple Creek" is an Appalachian-style old time tune and folk song, often played on the fiddle or banjo, listed as number 3434 in the Roud Folk Song Index.

The lyrics are probably no older than the year 1900, and the tune is of unknown origin. It has become a standard among bluegrass musicians and is often one of the first songs a banjo picker learns.

== Origin and context ==
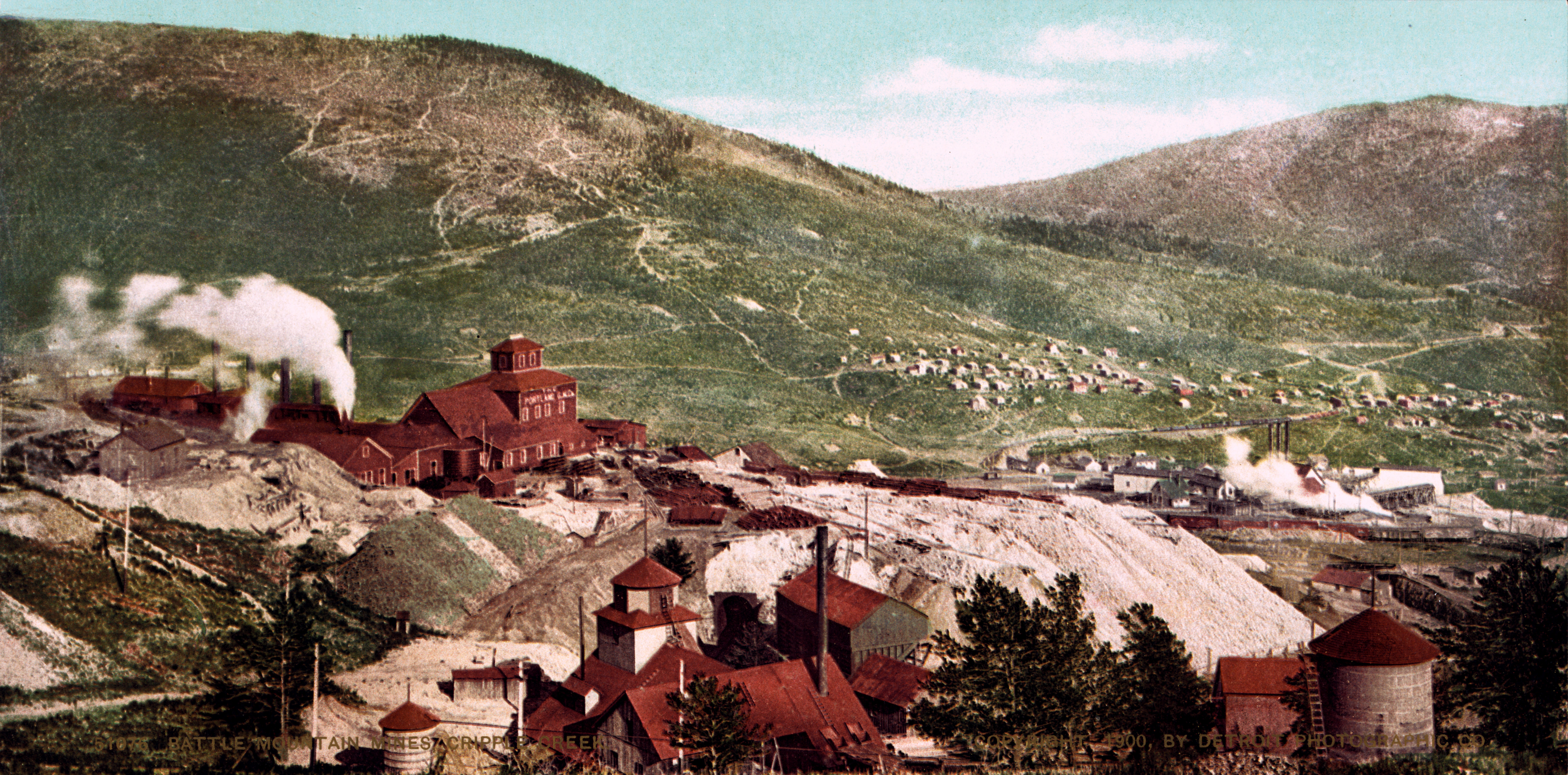
Cripple Creek, Colorado, c.1898

Its time of composition is unknown, and according to Bob Coltman, the tune is probably older than the lyrics.

The most famous Cripple Creek is Cripple Creek, Colorado, where a mining town was formed after gold was discovered there in 1891. However most traditional Virginia musicians believe that the song refers to Cripple Creek, Virginia.

== Score ==
Simplified version of the basic melody (A part followed by B part).

== Lyrics ==
The following are lyrics from a 1909 version included in the Journal of American Folklore, 1915.

Goin' to Cripple Creek, goin' ter Rome (roam),
Goin' ter Cripple Creek, goin' back home.
See them women layin' in the shade,
Waitin' fer the money them men have made.
Roll my breeches ter my knees
En wade ol' Cripple Creek when I please.

"(From East Tennessee; mountain whites; from memory; 1909)":

Goin' to Cripple Creek, going in a run;
Goin' to Cripple Creek to have my fun.

"(From South Carolina; country whites, MS. of Mr. Bryan; 1909)":

When Cecil Sharp collected folksongs in the Appalachian Mountains in 1917 he found two versions of "Cripple Creek", one from Lizzie Abner of Oneida, Kentucky and another from Alice Wilson of Pineville, Kentucky, a variant which begins "Buck Creek Girls, don't you want to go to Somerset?"

== Recordings ==
The first recording was in 1924 by Sam Jones (also known as Stovepipe No. 1), a black one-man-band. The Skillet Lickers recorded the song later in the same year. Luther Strong was recorded in 1937 by the Library of Congress singing the song.

Buffy Sainte-Marie recorded "Cripple Creek" for her 1964 album It's My Way!

Tony Saletan performed a banjo instrumental of "Cripple Creek" on Episode 27 (December 16, 1969) of the first season of Sesame Street to accompany a limberjack demonstration.

Leo Kottke performed a fingerpicked acoustic guitar arrangement on his 1971 album Mudlark.

Uncle Homer Walker performed the song in 1978 for the album Virginia Traditions - Non-Blues Secular Black Music (Smithsonian Folkways)

U. S. Senator Robert Byrd recorded the song for his 1978 album Mountain Fiddler.

Rising Appalachia recorded the song for their 2015 album Wider Circles.

2nd South Carolina String Band recorded (along with "Old Joe Clark" and "The Girl I Left Behind Me", in the same recording) the song for the album Aint Dead Yet! (2017).

Italian singer-songwriter Stefano Rosso recorded his own version for the album Banjoman in 2003.
