= Uncle Homer Walker =

John "Uncle" Homer Walker

Background information
- Born: February 15, 1898 or c. 1904; Mercer County, West Virginia, U.S.
- Origin: United States
- Died: January 4, 1980; Princeton, West Virginia, U.S.
- Genres: Old-time music Appalachian music
- Occupation: Musician
- Instrument: Banjo

John "Uncle" Homer Walker (February 15, 1898 or c. 1904 – January 4, 1980) was an American Appalachian banjo player who was popular during the folk revival of the 1960s and 1970s. Prior to his death, he was one of the last musicians to practice the old-time Appalachian style.

Walker was born in Mercer County, West Virginia into a musical family: his father, a sharecropper, was a banjo player, two sisters learned the mandolin and guitar, and Walker's two brothers played guitar. His grandfather, himself a former slave, taught Walker the clawhammer banjo playing style, once a fairly common pre-blues component found in the Appalachian Mountains region. In the 1920s, Walker began performing, sometimes accompanied by a mandolin or fiddle player, at square dances, presenting a repertoire of old-time black spirituals and folk tunes passed along to him from his grandfather like "Steal Away", "Cripple Creek", "John Henry", and "Old Joe Clark". He lived most of his adult life in Glen Lyn working as a laborer and farmhand.

During the folk revival of the 1960s and 1970s, Walker appeared at numerous folk festivals such as John Henry Folk Festival, the Vandalia Gathering in Charleston, the Smithsonian Institution’s Festival of American Folklife. Only during his appearances at these festivals, Walker claimed, did he first start incorporating the blues into his repertoire. In 1977, Walker was the subject of the documentary film Banjo Man, directed by Joseph Vinikow and Reuben Chodosh and narrated by bluesman Taj Mahal.

He died in Princeton, West Virginia. Walker's recordings are featured on the compilation albums Virginia Traditions - Non-Blues Secular Black Music and Black Banjo Songsters of North Carolina and Virginia.
