= The Cuckoo (song) =

Traditional English folk song

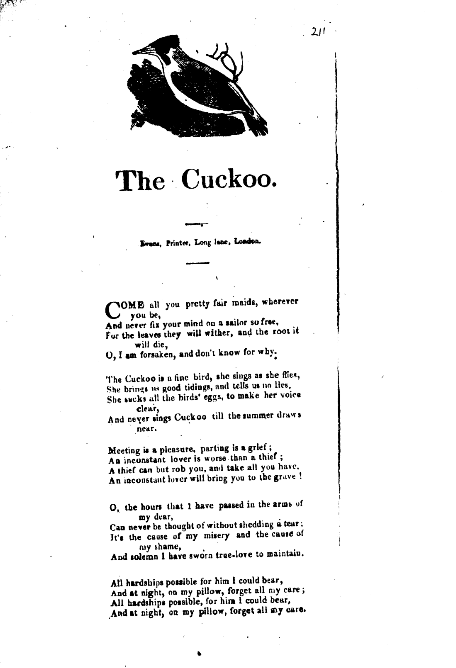
Broadside c. 1800

"The Cuckoo" (Roud 413) is a traditional English folk song, also sung in the United States, Canada, Scotland and Ireland. The song is known by many names, including "The Coo-Coo", "The Coo-Coo Bird", "The Cuckoo Bird", "The Cuckoo Is a Pretty Bird", "The Evening Meeting", "The Unconstant Lover", "Bunclody" and "Going to Georgia". In the United States, the song is sometimes syncretized with the other traditional folk song "Jack of Diamonds". Lyrics usually include the line (or a slight variation): "The cuckoo is a pretty bird, she sings as she flies; she brings us glad tidings, and she tells us no lies."

According to Thomas Goldsmith of The Raleigh News & Observer, "The Cuckoo" is an interior monologue where the singer "relates his desires — to gamble, to win, to regain love's affection."

The song is featured in the E.L. Doctorow book The March. A soldier suffering from a metal spike stuck in his head sings verses from the song.

== Synopsis ==
Usually, but not always, the song begins with a verse about the cuckoo, for example:

The cuckoo is a fine bird he sings as he flies,
He brings us good tidings and tells us no lies.
He sucks the sweet flowers to make his voice clear,
And the more he cries cuckoo, the summer is nigh.

(In many American versions, the cuckoo patriotically "never sings 'cuckoo' till the fourth of July". In some ornithologically observant English versions "she sucks little birds' eggs to make her voice clear.")

A young woman (usually - sometimes a young man) complains of the inconstancy of young men (or women) and the pain of losing in love. The song often consists mainly of "floating" verses (verses found in more than one song expressing common experiences and emotions), and apart from the constant cuckoo verse, usually sung at the beginning, there is no fixed order, though sometimes a verse sounds as if it is going to be the start of a story:

A-walking, a-talking, a-walking was I,
To meet my true lover, he'll come by and by,
To meet him in the meadows is all my delight,
A-walking and talking from morning till night.

but then:

O, meeting is a pleasure and parting is a grief,
An unconstant lover is worse than a thief,
A thief can but rob you and take all you have,
An unconstant lover will bring you to the grave.

Often there is a cautionary moral:

Come all pretty maidens wherever you be,
Don't trust in young soldiers to any degree,
They will kiss you and court you, poor girls to deceive,
There's not one in twenty poor girls can believe.

Or a more symbolic warning, here in a Mississippi version:

Come all you fair maidens take warning of me,
Don't place your affections on a sycamore tree,
For the top it will wither, and the roots they will die,
And if I'm forsaken, I know not for why.

=== Bunclody ===
An Irish song, this uses a similar tune and starts with verses extolling the beauty of Bunclody, a town in Co. Wexford. The third verse is the standard "Cuckoo is a pretty bird" and after an adapted floating verse:

If I were a clerk
And I could write a good hand
I would write to my true love
So that she'd understand
That I am a young fellow
Who is wounded in love
Once I lived in Buncloudy [sic]
But now must remove.

The song ends in a sad verse about emigration. There is a recording of this song by Luke Kelly of The Dubliners.

=== Note on the Cuckoo ===
The cuckoo (Cuculus canorus) was until recent times a common visitor to the English countryside in spring and early summer, and its distinctive call was considered the first sign of spring. It is a nest parasite, and the female really does eat an egg of the host species when she lays her own egg in the nest. It is an important bird in folklore.

The cuckoo has traditionally been associated with sexual incontinence and infidelity. An old name for the cuckoo was "cuckold's chorister", and old broadsides played on the idea that the cuckoo's call was a reproach to husbands whose wives were unfaithful:

The smith that on his anvill the iron hard doth ding:
He cannot heare the cuckoo though he loud doth sing
In poynting of plow harnesse, he labours till he sweat,
While another in his forge at home may steale a private heat.
– From The Cuckowes Comendation: / Or, the Cuckolds Credit: Being a merry Maying Song in Praise of the Cuckow., c.1625

== History ==
=== Early printed versions ===
"The Cuckoo" was published as a broadside by London and provincial printers, but does not seem to have been common. Broadsides are not precisely dated, but the earliest in the Bodleian Ballad Collection was published between 1780 and 1812 CE, the latest before 1845. The broadside texts are similar, of five verses starting with a "Come all ye" warning about courting sailors and with the cuckoo appearing in the second verse.

=== Collecting ===
The Roud Folk Song Index lists about 149 collected or recorded versions performed by traditional singers - 49 from England, 4 from Scotland, 2 from Ireland, 4 from Canada and 88 from the USA.

At least one collected version was published in the Folk Songs from the Kentucky Mountains (1917).

=== Field recordings ===
- Alan Lomax recorded Hobart Smith from Saltville, Virginia performing Cuckoo Bird in 1942, and he claimed to have learned it from a man named John Greer in the early 1910s. He also recorded Jean Ritchie from Viper, Kentucky singing The Cuckoo is a Pretty Bird in New York in 1949.
- Hamish Henderson recorded Willie Mathieson from Ellon, Aberdeenshire, singing The Evening Meeting in 1952.
- Max Hunter recorded Mrs Norma Kisner of Springdale Arkansas, singing a fragment of Unconstant Lover in 1960.
- Max Hunter recorded Olivia Hauser of Fayetteville, Arkansas, singing False Hearted Lover in 1961.

== Performers ==
The first known recording was made by Kelly Harrell for Victor in 1926.

The song has been covered by many musicians in several different styles. In North America, an early notable recorded version was performed in 1929 by Appalachian folk musician Clarence Ashley with an unusual banjo tuning.

Notable artists who have recorded "The Cuckoo" include:

Artist	Album name	Album year	Notes
Burr Tillstrom as Kukla	Kukla, Fran and Ollie	1951	
Billy Strings	Rock of Ages	2013	
Dave Alvin	Best of the Hightone Years	2008	--
David Eugene Edwards	Hyacinth	2023	--
Clarence Ashley	Anthology of American Folk Music, Vol. 1-3	1952	Recorded and released in 1929 and included in this compilation album
Cosmo Sheldrake	Wake Up Calls	2020	
Joan Baez	Live At Newport	1996	
The Be Good Tanyas	Blue Horse	2000	Song was titled "The Coo Coo Bird".
Big Brother and the Holding Company	Big Brother and the Holding Company	1967	Song was titled "Coo Coo".
Anne Briggs	Anne Briggs	1971	
Jake Xerxes Fussell	When I’m Called	2024	
Buck 65	Porch	2007	
Shirley Collins	Sweet England	1959	
Erik Darling	True Religion	1961	
Alfred Deller	The Art of Alfred Deller: The Counter-Tenor Legacy	2008	
Donovan	Beat Cafe	2004	
Dry Branch Fire Squad	Hand Hewn	2001	
Bob Dylan	Live at the Gaslight 1962	2005	
Rory Gallagher	Wheels Within Wheels	2003	
Tim Eriksen and Riley Baugus	Cold Mountain	2003	
The Everly Brothers	Heartaches and Harmonies	1994	
Kelly Harrell	Worried Blues	2006	The first version recorded, released in 1926
Kristin Hersh	Hips and Makers	1994	
Ramblin' Jack Elliott	Ramblin' Jack Elliott	1961	
Jonathan Foster	Roadside Attraction	2023	
Hem	Rabbit Songs	2002	
The Holy Modal Rounders	The Holy Modal Rounders	1964	
Hamish Imlach	Old Rarity	1971	
Kaleidoscope	Incredible!	1969	
The New Lost City Ramblers	Vol. 4	1962	
Osborne Brothers	Voices In Bluegrass	1973	
Pentangle	Basket of Light	1969	
Peter, Paul and Mary	A Song Will Rise	1965	
The Pine Hill Haints	Ghost Dance	2007	
Rising Appalachia	Leylines	2017	
Jean Ritchie	Singing the Traditional Songs of Her Kentucky Mountain Family	1952	
Tom Rush	Tom Rush	1965	
Sam Shackleton	Causeway Recordings	2022	
Martin Simpson	Righteousness and Humidity	2003	
Hobart Smith	In Sacred Trust: The 1963 Fleming Brown Tapes	2005	
Taj Mahal	The Natch'l Blues	1968	
Steve Martin & Edie Brickell	Music from The American Epic Sessions	2017	
Richard Thompson & Eliza Carthy	The Harry Smith Project Live Vol. 1	2006	
Peter Tork	Live/Backstage at the Coffee Gallery	2006	
Artie Traum	Thief of Time	2007	
Doc Watson & Clarence Ashley	Original Folkways Recordings: 1960–1962	1994	
Doc & Merle Watson	Ballads From Deep Gap	1967	
Townes Van Zandt	Roadsongs	1994	
Laura Veirs	Two Beers Veirs	2008	
Uncle Sinner	Ballads and Mental Breakdowns	2008	
Hickory Wind	At the Wednesday Night Waltz	1974	
John Renbourn	Faro Annie	1971	Renbourn had previously recorded the song as a member of the band Pentangle (qv).
Willie Watson	Folksinger Vol. 2	2017	
David Eugene Edwards	Hyacinth	2023	

== See also ==
Folk songs with shared motifs and floating verses include:

- Come All You Fair and Tender Ladies
- Jack of Diamonds (song)
- On Top of Old Smoky
