= Tina & Her Pony =

American indie folk duo

- Origin: Asheville, North Carolina, U.S.
- Genres: Folk, Americana
- Years active: 2009–present
- Members: Tina Collins
- Past members: Quetzal Jordan
- Website: tinaandherpony.com

Tina & Her Pony is an American indie folk music project based in Asheville, North Carolina, United States, consisting of Tina Collins and rotating band members, who began making music together in early 2009. They spent two years in the high desert mountain town of Taos, New Mexico making music and friends. After an 18-month album release tour spanning the United States and Canada, they established a new home base in Asheville and released their album, Champion. Their approach to music feels at once old-timey and totally modern. They exhibit an enviable versatility on several instruments—Collins on tenor banjo, tenor ukulele, and guitar—and they blend their voices to create harmonies that wrap listeners in sound.

== Biography ==
Tina & Her Pony was formed in 2009 in Asheville. Collins had grown up on the periphery of the Appalachians. They released their first full-length album in March 2012, which was mixed and mastered in Oakland, California, with Myles Boisen (The Tiger Lillies, Kronos Quartet) and features the trumpeter Chris Grady (also featured on Tom Waits’ Mule Variations). They also released a six-track EP titled Walkin’ in My Sleep at the same time. After completing an eighteen-month album release tour that took the band through the entire USA and Canada, they moved to Asheville to work on Champion, released in fall 2017. Champion was recorded at Echo Mountain Recording and features musicians from Rising Appalachia, The Honeycutters, and Holy Ghost Tent Revival.

=== Musical style and influence ===
As a classically trained musician, Collins is known for her tight, vocals and simple, exposed instrumentation on tenor banjo, tenor ukulele and guitar.

They could draw easy and favorable comparisons to The Indigo Girls. Like their forebears, Tina & Her Pony's harmonies are deep in the pocket. The songs themselves carry a gentle wisdom that invigorates the listener. The music draws inspiration from both Appalachia and the high desert, in addition to "bluegrass and old-time melodies that have been sung by generations of women before".

Tina and Her Pony is contributing a unique sound to the American folk tradition.

== Discography ==
1. Walkin' in My Sleep (2012)
  1. "The Ghost Tree" (2:40)
  2. "Sweet Love" (2:35)
  3. "Burning Mother Mary" (3:12)
  4. "Walkin' in My Sleep" (2:09)
  5. "Back Home" (3:44)
  6. "Rough and Rocky" (4:50)
2. Tina and Her Pony (2012)
  1. "Sweet Love" (2:43)
  2. "Far Away" (2:37)
  3. "Little Bird" (3:10)
  4. "Rain and Snow" (5:00)
  5. "Ana Bai" (3:42)
  6. "Never Had You" (2:42)
  7. "I'm So Lonesome" (4:22)
  8. "Winter in the West" (1:56)
  9. "Burning Mother Mary" (3:11)
  10. "Crash and Burn" (0:17)
  11. "Medicine" (3:08)
  12. "Snow Covered Mountains" (3:10)
3. Champion (2017)
  1. "Back in Your Life" (4:21)
  2. "I'm the Same" (5:53)
  3. "I Can Love You Better" (1:47)
  4. "Folly" (3:19)
  5. "Good Man" (2:15)
  6. "Come Here" (5:06)
  7. "Long Iron Chain" (3:10)
  8. "Champion" (5:07)
  9. "The BBQ" (4:01)
  10. "Bat" (2:57)
  11. "Lion Teeth" (5:48)
  12. "The Wind" (2:41)

4. Marigolds (2023)

1. Swings

2. Beautiful Mess

3. Loon

4. Flowers

5. Canadian Summer

6. Fly Around

7. Pull You Close

8. Sail Me Away

9. Ohio

10. Golden Highway

11. Forgotten Spring

12. Yellow Rose
