= LEAF Community Arts =

Non-profit arts organization and festival

LEAF from above

LEAF Community Arts or LEAF (originally an acronym for the Lake Eden Arts Festival), is a non-profit organization established to put on arts festivals, events, mentoring, and educational programs. It was organized by the producers of the Lake Eden Arts Festival, now known simply as "LEAF" or the "LEAF Festival", held in Black Mountain, North Carolina.

Occurring twice a year since 1995, the festival includes international and local music, handcrafts, dancing, cuisine, children's activities, outdoor adventures, drum circles, a zipline, and canoeing.

== History ==
When LEAF was created in 1995, it was an acronym for "Lake Eden Arts Festival". As of 2012, the original name is only used as a historical reference - it has transformed into LEAF Community Arts often referred to as "LEAF". LEAF has several signature programs including: LEAF Festival, LEAF Schools & Streets, LEAF International, LEAF Downtown AVL, and LEAF Local.

=== History of the venue ===
The home of LEAF, Lake Eden Events & Camp Rockmont for Boys, was the site of the historic Black Mountain College (BMC). Many of the century's most celebrated artists and thinkers attended the college as teachers or students: Albert Einstein, Robert Rauschenberg, Anni Albers, Merce Cunningham, Rothko and Buckminster Fuller (who designed the first geodesic dome there). Prior to BMC, in the early 1900s, Edwin Wiley Grove (of the Grove Park Inn and Grove Arcade) developed the land and constructed some buildings with his trademark native stone fireplaces. Prior to Grove, The Lake Eden Inn and Resort offered a getaway for people seeking its healing waters and rejuvenating air.

No festival was held in 2020.

== Outreach ==
LEAF in Schools & Streets is a non-profit collaborative outreach program bringing performing artists into schools and community centers for hands-on workshops, residencies, and interactive performances. The experience provides opportunities for youth to perform alongside resident artists on a national stage, with family members in the audience.

== Notable performers ==
- Abigail Washburn - Clawhammer banjo
- BeauSoleil - Louisiana
- Béla Fleck
- Ben Sollee- genre-bending percussive cellist
- The Be Good Tanyas - Canadian Folk
- Bernie Worrell & The Woo Warriors
- Billy Jonas – Folk
- Buckwheat Zydeco
- Chirgilchin - Throat Singers - Tuva
- Chuck Brodsky - Folk
- Clarence "Gatemouth" Brown - Blues
- Corey Harris - Blues
- Cyril Neville's Tribe 13- New Orleans
- DakhaBrakha - Ukrainian Folk Rock
- Dan Hicks & the Hot Licks
- David Holt Band
- David Wilcox - Folk
- Deer Clan Singers w/ Pura Fé – Native American
- Dervish – Ireland
- Donna the Buffalo
- Duckbutter w/ Sam Bush & John Cowan
- Eileen Ivers & Immigrant Soul - Celtic
- Enter The Haggis- Celtic
- Fairport Convention - England
- Fishbone - punk
- The Holmes Brothers - Soul
- Ivan Neville's Dumpstaphunk- New Orleans
- Jean-Paul Samputu & Ingeli - Rwanda
- Jeff Oster – Jazz HypnoGroove
- Kruger Brothers - Switzerland
- Larkin Poe
- Le Vent du Nord – Canada
- Leah Song
- Les Nubians - France
- Linda Thompson - England
- Llan de Cubel - Spain
- Lonesome River Band - Bluegrass
- Los Amigos Invisibles - Venezuela
- Los Hombres Calientes – New Orleans
- Mahotella Queens – South Africa
- Mamadou Diabaté - Kora player - Mali
- Marcia Ball – Louisiana R& B
- Maria Muldaur & Blusiana Band - Folk
- Martha Redbone
- Michael Franti – Hip Hop
- Niyaz – Traditional, Folk, Ethnic
- Odetta – Folk Icon
- The Persuasions
- Ralph Stanley & The Clinch Mountain Boys
- Rebirth Brass Band – New Orleans
- The Red Stick Ramblers- New Orleans
- Ricardo Lemvo & Makina Loco – Congo/Cuba
- Richie Havens – Folk Icon
- Rising Appalachia- World Music/Spoken Word/Bluegrass
- Robin and Linda Williams
- Samantha Fish
- Samite - Uganda
- Scythian - Celtic Rock with Gypsy flavor
- Shringara Nepal
- The Subdudes – New Orleans
- Thomas Mapfumo & The Blacks Unlimited – Zimbabwe
- Tim O'Brien - Folk
- Tony Trischka Band - Bluegrass
- A Tribe Called Red aka The Halluci Nation - First Nations Canadian Dance Beats
- The Wailers Band - Reggae
- Wild Asparagus – Contra & Celtic
- Xavier Rudd - Australia
- The Wild Magnolias – New Orleans
- Yerba Buena - Cuba
- Yungchen Lhamo - Tibet
