= Alive (Rising Appalachia album) =

Live album by Rising Appalachia
- Released: September 29, 2017
- Genre: Appalachian folk, world, soul
- Label: Independent

Rising Appalachia chronology
Wider Circles (2015)	Alive (2017)	Leylines (2019)

Alive is a 2017 live album by American Appalachian band Rising Appalachia. Alive was named an "Album of the Year 2017" by The Arts Desk. The album was compiled from recordings made at live shows over the previous two years.

== Critical reception ==
Kath Galasso reviewed the album for On Stage Magazine, quoting the band as saying that Alive "...is a collection of songs that are telling of the time. A time where the veil has been lifted and we want people to WAKE UP, to be WOKE, to be ALIVE."

The album was featured by The Spill Magazine, along with an interview with Leah Song. It was also reviewed by Erick Mertz for the UK magazine Bearded, who wrote "In total, the performance is complete. Banter between songs keeps the fire burning. Rising Appalachia allows the performance to take on its own energy, up and down, like the life cycle of joys and sorrows that it aims to replicate," although he was disappointed at the lack of variety and had hoped for more of a "political edge."

Alive was named an "Album of the Year 2017" by The Arts Desk.

== Track listing ==
Rising Appalachia (2017). Alive (CD). Independent.

No.	Title	Writer(s)	Length
1.	"Lean In" (live)		5:09
2.	"Cripple Creek" (live)	Traditional	5:29
3.	"Medicine" (live)		8:41
4.	"Novels of Acquaintance" (live)		6:23
5.	"Closer to the Edge" (live)		3:19
6.	"Swoon" (live)		5:33
7.	"Wider Circles" (live)		8:14
8.	"Mississippi" (live)		3:09
9.	"Occupy" (live)	Based on traditional spiritual "Soon I Will Be Done"	4:08
10.	"Cumberland Gap" (live)	Traditional	5:01
11.	"Stromboli" (live)		6:30
