= Wider Circles =

Studio album by Rising Appalachia
- Released: July 17, 2015
- Studio: Echo Mountain Recording; (Asheville, NC)
- Genre: Appalachian folk, world, soul
- Label: Independent

Rising Appalachia chronology
| Filthy Dirty South (2012) | Wider Circles (2015) | Alive (2017) |

Wider Circles is the fifth studio album by American Appalachian band Rising Appalachia. It was recorded at Echo Mountain Recording in Asheville, North Carolina, and was released on July 17, 2015.

== Background ==
Leah Song coined the term "Slow Music Movement" while preparing for a TedX talk. During their Wider Circles Rail Tour, the band travelled by Amtrak train. Song connected this with the "Slow Music Movement", which she described as exploring the question as to how music can be a public service, saying:

We want to have relationships with the farmers and the food of each region and also to have a relationship with different educational initiatives and non-profits. We have a policy that at each show at least two non-profits are welcome, invited — non-profits or educational initiatives, arts justice projects — to the show to set up tables and let the audiences know, as well as ourselves, what’s going on locally.

== Critical reception ==
Amy Lieberman, who reviewed Wider Circles for NYS Music, wrote "Seamlessly covering the entire spectrum of musical genres, ranging from traditional music of the American South highlighting the banjo and fiddle, to world music featuring African drums, there’s something on this album for everyone to enjoy." Desdemona Dallas, reviewing for Lost in Sound, noted that "Songs 'Medicine' and 'Oh Death' light upon the Smith sisters’ wordsmithing ways as slam poets." Thandiwe Ogbonna, writing for No Depression, said

The talents of Biko Casini (world percussion) and David Brown (stand-up bass/baritone guitar) pair with Leah and Chloe’s signature vocal harmonies and banjo/fiddle duets to explore elements of folk, jazz, and soul and topics ranging from mountaintop removal to herbal medicine.

John Malkin, writing for Spirituality & Health Magazine noted that "The inviting songs of Wider Circles focus on community, gratitude, and healing." Not all reviewers were enthusiastic; Jonathan Levitt, writing for Blurt gave the album a 3-star review, yet summarized the album as "An organic chilled vibe that provides a much-needed antidote to the processed tripe found on the radio these days."

== Track listing ==
Rising Appalachia (2015). Wider Circles (CD). Independent.

| No. | Title | Writer(s) | Length |
|---|---|---|---|
| 1. | "Novels of Acquaintance" | | 6:28 |
| 2. | "Lean In" | | 3:38 |
| 3. | "Fall On My Knees" | | 4:44 |
| 4. | "Rivermouth" | | 3:52 |
| 5. | "Oh Death" | Traditional | 6:47 |
| 6. | "An Invitation" | | 2:40 |
| 7. | "Medicine" | | 4:25 |
| 8. | "Find Your Way" | | 4:45 |
| 9. | "Synchronicity" | | 3:32 |
| 10. | "Cripple Creek" | Traditional | 4:52 |
| 11. | "Condensation" (Interlude) | | 1:17 |
| 12. | "Spirit's Cradle" | | 4:44 |
| 13. | "Wider Circles" | | 5:13 |
| 14. | "Bright Morning Stars / Botawak" | Traditionals | 6:37 |
| 15. | "Stromboli" | | 4:44 |
