= Pirin, Blagoevgrad Province =

Pirin
- Village
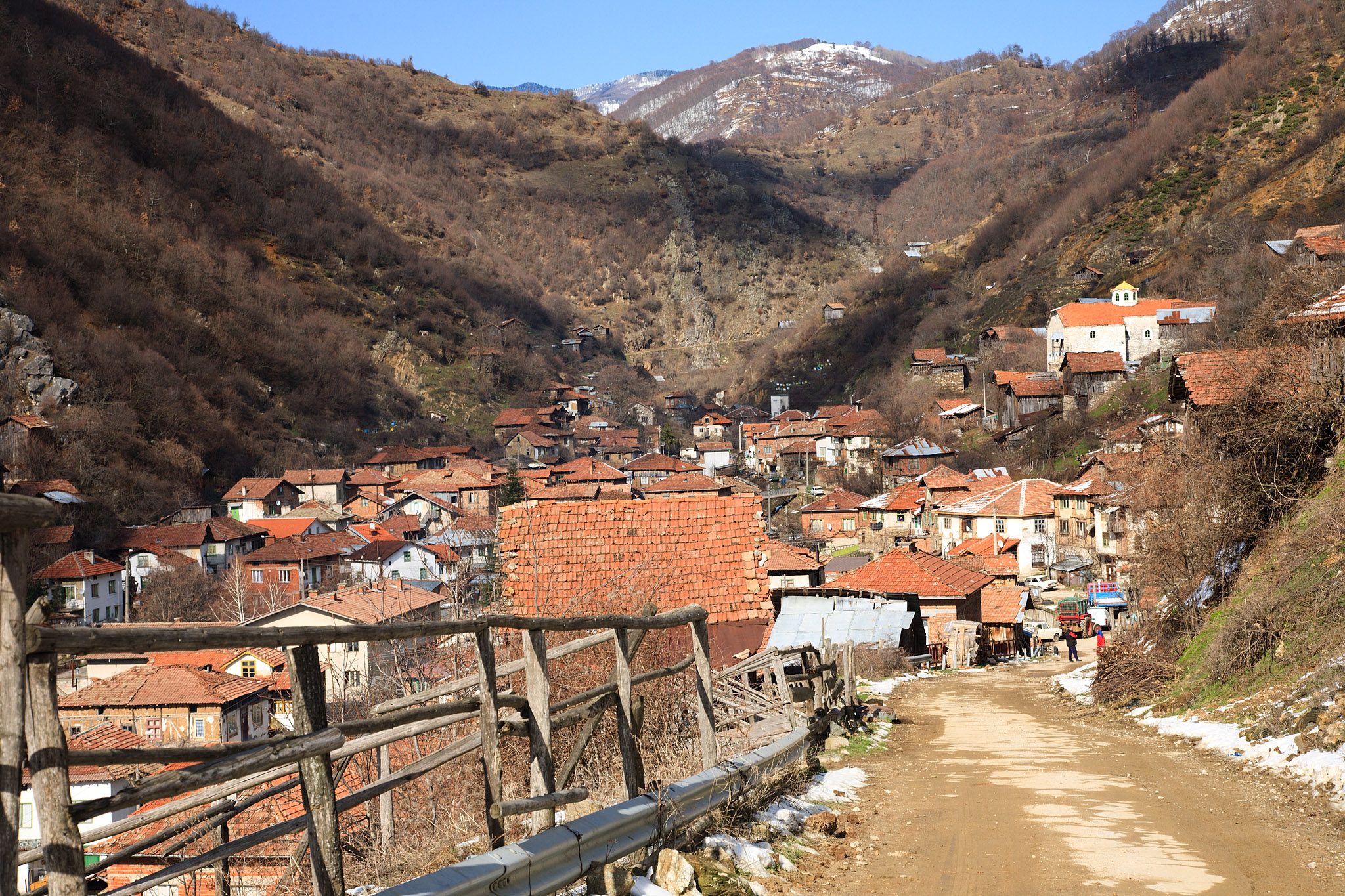

- Location within Bulgaria
- Coordinates: 41°33′N 23°34′E
- Country: Bulgaria
- Province: Blagoevgrad Province
- Municipality: Sandanski
- Time zone: UTC+2 (EET)
  - Summer (DST): UTC+3 (EEST)

Pirin is a village in the municipality of Sandanski, in Blagoevgrad Province, Bulgaria.
