= Filthy Dirty South =

Studio album by Rising Appalachia
- Released: December 9, 2012
- Recorded: Echo Mountain Recording; (Asheville, NC)
- Genre: Appalachian folk, world, soul
- Label: Independent

Rising Appalachia chronology
The Sails of Self (2010)	Filthy Dirty South (2012)	Wider Circles (2015)

Filthy Dirty South is the fourth studio album by American Appalachian band Rising Appalachia. It was recorded at Echo Mountain Recording in Asheville, North Carolina, and released on December 9, 2012.

== Background ==
In 2011, the band started a crowd funding request on the website Kickstarter to facilitate the creation of the album. They raised a total of $11,180.00 within one month and released the album in 2012.

== Critical reception ==
Steve Wildsmith of The Daily News reported on the forthcoming album and associated tour. The album was reviewed in the January 2013 issue of INsite Atlanta. Thandiwe Ogbonna, writing for No Depression, said "Filthy Dirty South is an overall outstanding work of clever musicianship. A tour of world sounds that could be scattered and disjointed is very skilfully executed with a pleasant flow."

Dan Levenson reviewed the album, along with the band's two previous studio albums, in the January 2015 issue of Banjo Newsletter, taking great interest in Leah Song's distinctive "clawhammer" banjo style. Bob Stepno reviewed the album, along with the band's first album, Leah and Chloe, in the Spring 2015 issue of the Journal of Appalachian Studies, specifically addressing the band's ability to (quoting from the lyrics of "Occupy") "occupy Appalachia."

== Track listing ==
Rising Appalachia (2012). Filthy Dirty South (CD). Independent.

No.	Title	Writer(s)	Length
1.	"Mississippi Song"		2:34
2.	"Filthy Dirty South"		5:46
3.	"Remember What You Told Me"	Traditional	5:01
4.	"Pretty Lil' Foot / Trouble in Mind"	Traditional / Richard M. Jones	3:30
5.	"Closer to the Edge"		3:17
6.	"The Long Haul"		3:59
7.	"I'll Fly Away"	Traditional	5:00
8.	"Just a Closer Walk with Thee"	Traditional	4:10
9.	"Your Sweet Loving"	Sam Cooke	4:28
10.	"Cumberland Gap"	Traditional	4:20
11.	"Take Me Downtown"		5:14
12.	"Zavedi Me Lalino"	The Bisserov Sisters	2:50
13.	"Calling Me Home/ Ye Ye Bongye"	Alice Gerrard / Traditional (Congolese)	5:37
14.	"Occupy"		4:34
15.	"Cluck Ol' Hen"	Traditional	7:51
16.	"[Untitled]"		1:30
