= The Lost Mystique of Being in the Know =

Studio album by Rising Appalachia
- Released: May 21, 2021
- Studio: Echo Mountain Recording; (Asheville, NC)
- Genre: Appalachian folk, world, soul
- Label: Independent

Rising Appalachia chronology
Leylines (2019)	The Lost Mystique of Being in the Know (2021)

The Lost Mystique of Being in the Know is the seventh studio album by American Appalachian band Rising Appalachia. The album was engineered at Echo Mountain Recording in Asheville, North Carolina and was released on May 21, 2021. The tracks were recorded during a one-day session following over a year of isolation due to COVID-19 restrictions.

== Critical reception ==
The album was a surprise release. It is their ninth album (seventh studio album), and was reviewed by Jim Shahen in The Journal of Roots Music, who wrote that "it's a testament to their exuberance and spontaneous creativity." It was also reviewed by Madeline Crone for American Songwriter, who wrote that "this project is a lot more abstract than their previous discography," and by Mike Davies for the UK's folk radio, who reviewed each song in detail and concluded "undoubtedly one of the most intoxicating musical experiences you’ll have this year." Doug Deloach reviewed it for Songlines, giving it five stars and writing, "Across nine tracks culled from a one-day recording session after ten months of COVID-induced isolation, Rising Appalachia have delivered one of 2021’s sweetest world music albums."

== Track listing ==
Rising Appalachia (2021). The Lost Mystique of Being in the Know (CD). Independent.

No.	Title	Length
1.	"Catalyst"	6:18
2.	"Ngoni"	5:11
3.	"Silver"	6:57
4.	"Tempest"	5:30
5.	"Lost Girl"	7:12
6.	"Top Shelf"	5:14
7.	"Clay"	5:36
8.	"Keep Going"	2:53
9.	"Depth"	9:13
