= Leylines =

Studio album by Rising Appalachia
- Released: May 3, 2019
- Studios: Panoramic House; (West Marin, CA)
- Genres: Appalachian folk, world, soul
- Label: Independent
- Producer: Joe Henry

Rising Appalachia chronology
Alive (2017)	Leylines (2019)	The Lost Mystique of Being in the Know (2021)

Leylines is the sixth studio album by American Appalachian band Rising Appalachia. The album was produced by Joe Henry, recorded over ten days in Marin County studio Panoramic House, and released on May 3, 2019. Leylines was ranked on the Billboard Top Heatseekers chart, peaking at No. 22 for the week ending May 18, 2019. Singer-songwriters Ani DiFranco and Trevor Hall, as well as jazz trumpeter Maurice Turner, are featured on the album.

== Background ==
The single "Resilient" was released on May 1, 2018. and received favorable reviews from NPR Music and Rolling Stone. The "Resilient" video, which features dancers Quentin Robinson, Justin Conte, Lukas van der Fecht, and Amy Secada, was reviewed by Bob Boilen for NPR Music's All Songs TV, and by Steph Castor for the June 2018 issue of Girl Guitar Magazine.

== Critical reception ==
The theme of Leylines is interconnectedness. In an interview, Chloe Smith said that the word 'leylines'

... alludes to magnetic points of spirit, energy, history, and power in various parts of the world. Unique connections that are more subtle than linear, if you will. We always sense connections between far removed places, and our album is a reflection of that with the layering of Appalachia, Ireland, and West Africa. We wanted to weave lines of connections aurally with both traditional music from those places as well as contemporary lyrics..."

The album was reviewed by George Graham in The Graham Album Review, who wrote:

Rising Appalachia’s new album Leylines [...] is an outstanding recording by another group who takes what is basically folk music and turns it into something quite eclectic. The group has a lot of strengths, not the least of which are the excellent sibling vocal harmonies, but also includes the mixture of southern banjo and fiddle, with world percussion and African string instruments. The material is also a nice combination of creatively arranged traditional songs with their original pieces, some imbued with social commentary. It’s all very tastefully performed.

=== Individual tracks ===
The song "Harmonize" was released early as a music video which was featured by Rolling Stone. The song "Cuckoo" was featured in Paste, the song "Sunny Days" was featured in Relix, and the song "Speak Out" was featured in Brooklyn Vegan. The final track "Resilient" is a full band version of the single first released in 2018 as a duo performance and music video.

== Track listing ==
Rising Appalachia (2019). Leylines (CD). Independent.

No.	Title	Writer(s)	Length
1.	"I Believe in Being Ready"		2:10
2.	"Harmonize"		5:08
3.	"Speak Out" (feat. Ani DiFranco)		3:56
4.	"Love Her in the Mornin'"		7:36
5.	"Shed Your Grace" (feat. Trevor Hall)		3:40
6.	"Sadjuna"		5:16
7.	"Make Magic"		5:07
8.	"Sassafras"		4:01
9.	"Sunny Days"		3:32
10.	"Cuckoo"	Traditional	5:20
11.	"Indigo Dance" (feat. Maurice Turner)		3:27
12.	"Resilient" (full band)		5:46

== See also ==
- Songlines
