= Environmental issues in Appalachia =

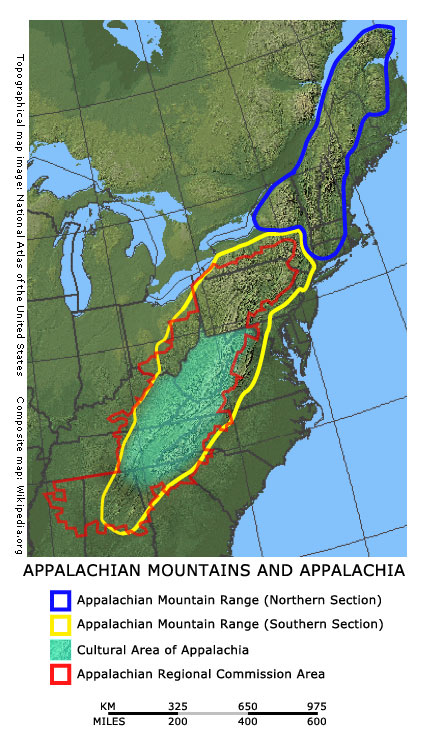
Areas sometimes included when referencing the Appalachian region. Northern section is generally not included.

Environmental issues in Appalachia, a cultural region in the Eastern United States, include long term and ongoing environmental impact from human activity, and specific incidents of environmental harm such as environmental disasters related to mining. A mountainous area with significant coal deposits, many environmental issues in the region are related to coal and gas extraction. Some extraction practices, particularly surface mining, have met significant resistance locally and at times have received international attention.

Besides coal mining and natural gas extraction, Appalachia faces other environmental issues, including deforestation, soil erosion, climate change, and water scarcity. Deforestation has negatively impacted the region's biologically diverse forests, reducing habitat for various species and altering the forest ecosystem. The steep slopes and heavy rainfall in Appalachia make it susceptible to soil erosion, which can be worsened by land use changes like logging and mining, leading to sedimentation in rivers and streams. Climate change has also affected the region, causing more frequent and severe weather events, shifts in precipitation patterns, and changes in seasonal events. While Appalachia is known for its abundant water resources, water scarcity is a concern in some areas, especially during droughts, which can be worsened by climate change and industrial water withdrawals.

Additionally, black lung disease has been prevalent in the Appalachia region. This disease is common in coal workers due to the inhalation of coal and silica dust in mining sites. Appalachia emerges as the hotspot of this disease, even in lower-class neighborhoods. Minimal screening of the disease has been registered even after passing the Coal Mine Health and Safety Act as early as 1969. There is an urgent need for public health policy in the area to regulate the impacts of coal mining on the spread of black lung disease.

== Coal mining ==
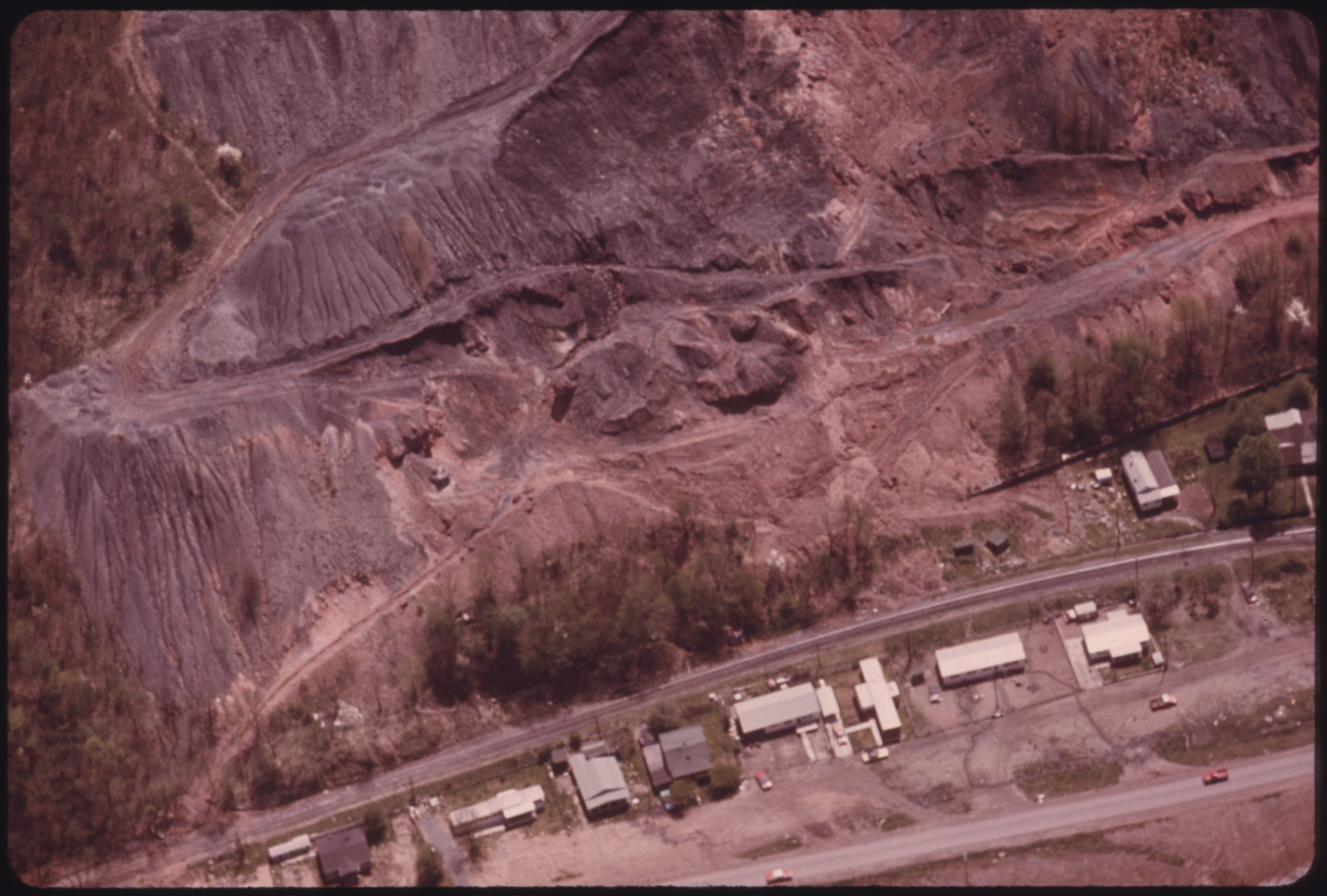
Slag heap above housing on Buffalo Creek near Logan, West Virginia

Rural communities in Appalachia suffer from environmental, economic and got destroyed by health disparities related to coal mining. Environmental activism has tended to be a divisive issue because of the dependence of the regional economy on extractive industries, including coal mining. Environmental disasters related to coal mining include coal seam fires (Carbondale mine fire, Centralia mine fire, and Laurel Run mine fire) and coal slurry spills.

=== History ===
Coal was found in the 1740s in Virginia, but use remained small scale until the 1800s. Mountaintop removal mining has been practiced since the 1960s.

==== The Surface Mining Control and Reclamation Act of 1977 ====
The Surface Mining Control and Reclamation Act of 1977 (SMCRA) was signed into law by President Jimmy Carter, after being vetoed twice by Gerald Ford. Before SMCRA most coal states had passed their own mining laws. SMCRA states that "reclaimed land must be as useful as the land was before mining".

SMCRA also created the Office of Surface Mining, an agency within the Department of the Interior, to promulgate regulations, to fund state regulatory and reclamation efforts, and to ensure consistency among state regulatory programs.

Early attempts to regulate strip-mining on the state level were largely unsuccessful due to lax enforcement. The Appalachian Group to Save the Land and the People was founded in 1965 to stop surface mining. In 1968, Congress held the first hearings on strip mining. Ken Hechler introduced the first strip-mining abolition bill in Congress in 1971. Though this bill was not passed, provisions establishing a process to reclaim abandoned strip mines and allowing citizens to sue regulatory agencies became parts of SMCRA.

After SMCRA was passed, the coal industry immediately challenged it as exceeding the limits of Congressional leglative power under the Commerce Clause. In Hodel v. Virginia Surface Mining and Reclamation Association (1981) the Supreme Court held that Congress does have the authority to regulate coal mining, generally.

==== The War on Coal ====
Some organizations have said that the Obama Administration's EPA and other federal agencies were engaged in a "war on coal". Organizations such as The American Coalition for Clean Coal Electricity (ACCCE), member companies of the National Mining Association, the United States Chamber of Commerce, as well as anonymous donor political action committees (PACs) spent millions of dollars to promote this message through print, radio and television advertisements. They argued that the proposed regulatory actions would increase the costs of mining and burning coal. They further argued that the regulations would increase the costs of disposing of mining wastes, destroy tens of thousands of jobs, and threaten the "way of life" of coalfield families.

Several categories of federal regulations are at issue:

1. The Mine Safety and Health Administration (MSHA), including lowering levels of black-lung causing coal dust and enforceable standards to identify "patterns of violations" by mining companies
1. EPA Clean Water Act Regulatory Proposals including efforts to identify buffer zones near streams where mountaintop removal strip-mining and disposal of coal mining wastes would be prohibited
1. EPA Clean Air Act proposals

A study conducted by the Great Lakes Energy Institute has found that fracking has driven the decline in coal production in the United States. Professor Mingguo Hong has said that while the EPA rules may have an impact, the data shows that the regulations have not been the driving force behind the decline of coal production.

=== Mountaintop mining ===
Mountaintop mining, also called mountaintop removal (MTR), is a form of strip mining and surface mining. This mining process uses explosives to blast the tops of mountains and access underlying coal deposits. It has resulted in mountains being flattened into "synthetic prairies." Researchers have found that mountaintop mining (MTM) is more damaging to rivers, biodiversity and human health than underground mining.

After the 1990 Amendments to the Clean Air Act established a trading and quota system for sulfur dioxide emissions, coal-burning plants began to demand more low-sulfur coal. In response to this increase in demand, mining companies expanded extraction in areas with significant low sulfur coal deposits—in particular, the Appalachian Mountains of West Virginia, Ohio, Kentucky, southern Virginia, and eastern Tennessee.

After the mountaintops are blasted to reveal low-sulfur coal deposits, the excess rock and earth created by mountaintop removal is dumped into the valleys. This has buried hundreds of miles of streams under dumped earth. The Charleston Daily Mail reported that MTR has buried 2,000 miles of streams in Appalachia, has contaminated water supplies, and endangered the health of Appalachian communities.

Under federal law, mountaintop removal is only allowed if mine operators planned to build schools, shopping centers, factories or public parks on the flattened land. A spokeswoman for the National Mining Association has said "these reclamation activities have provided much needed level land above the flood plain for construction of schools, government offices, medical facilities, airports, shopping centers and housing developments." However, a 2010 survey of 410 mountaintop removal sites found that only 26 of the sites (6.3 percent of total) "yield some form of verifiable post-mining economic development." Joe Lovett is the founder of the Appalachia Center for the Economy and Environment and an attorney who has filed a federal lawsuit against the West Virginia Division of Environmental Protection for issuing mountaintop removal permits without the required post-mining land use plans. Lovett has said the "coal companies are simply taking off mountaintops and dumping them into West Virginia's streams, harming the communities and the environment in the process."

=== Health effects ===
Cancer rates in Central Appalachia are higher than elsewhere in the United States. Researchers who have studied the disproportionate rates of cancer in this region have found that there are many contributing factors including poverty and poor health habits. The link between mining and health is controversial. Studies that controlled factors like smoking and obesity have found that cancer, heart disease and birth defects are "associated" with MTR. Cancers are more common in MTR areas. A U.S. Geological Survey found high levels of the carcinogens aluminum and silica in air samples from MTR regions in Appalachia. The researchers also found traces of chromium, sulfate, selenium and magnesium in the air.These components of granite rock may elevate the risk of cancer through respiratory damage. Another study found elevated levels of another carcinogen, arsenic, in toenail samples collected from residents of Appalachian Kentucky.

The major respiratory problem in coal mining fields is the black lung disease, also known as pneumoconiosis. The rate of BLD doubles almost every decade . Miners in Appalachia are vulnerable to this disease due to chronic exposure to coal dust. Other diseases are the chronic obstructive pulmonary disease. Another problem is waterborne diseases in the coal mining areas. There' s high levels of major ions in the freshwaters of streams in Appalachia. This water flows downstream to various biodiversity, urban and human use. Therefore human health is put to risk by the anthropogenic salinization of fresh water. Mountain top removal mining leads to congenital birth anomalies due to prenatal exposure of environmental contamination. Common defects are the congenital heart defects associated with exposure to coal mining in Appalachia. Mental health is negatively affected when miners experience mental fatigue, sleep disorders, job stress and anxiety

== Fracking ==
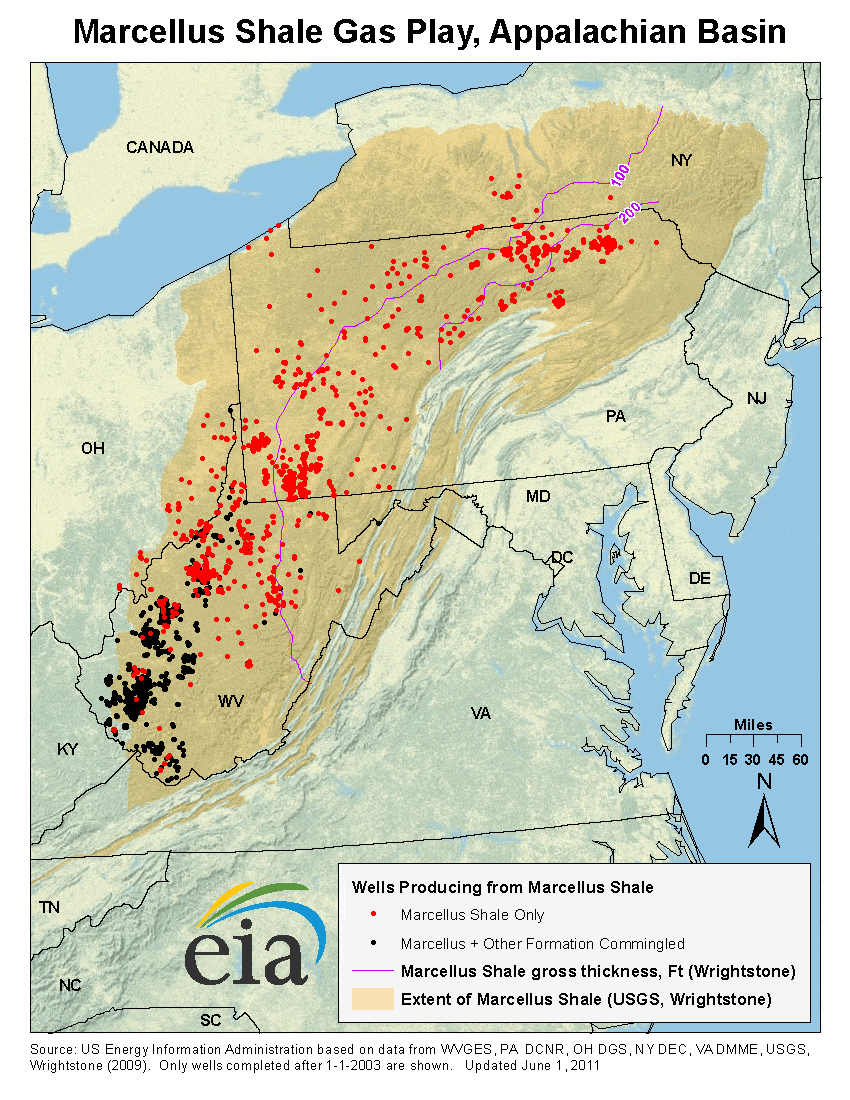
Producing gas wells in the Marcellus Shale gas play

Fracking is a colloquial term for "horizontal drilling and hydraulic fracturing." During the 19th century natural gas was easy to extract from moderate depths using vertical wells. Sometimes wells were not needed at all because the gas was so plentiful it would bubble up from the ground. As non-renewable energy resources become more scarce, advances in fracking technology have allowed access to natural gas reserves accumulated in shale formations. Reserves of natural gas in the Marcellus Shale rock formation are valued at around $500 billion in Pennsylvania alone.

While coal production in Appalachia has been in decline, advances in fracking technology have contributed to the regional "natural gas boom." The coal deposit of eastern Kentucky and southern West Virginia's coal fields have been mined longer than other reserves in the United States. The remaining deposits in these areas are deeper and the costs of extraction has increased.

Adverse environmental and health impacts have been reported by communities who live near areas with significant fracking activity. Studies have shown that fracking may be a cause of groundwater contamination.

One issue that has been raised is the disposal of wastewater created by the fracking process. The salty wastewater contains dissolved solids like sulfates and chlorides, which sewage and drinking water plants are unable to remove. West Virginia has asked sewage treatment plants to not accept frack water after regulators determined that the levels of dissolved solids in drinking water exceeded government standards.

There are concerns about the environmental and health impacts of the entire process - from site preparation to waste management. Environmental activists have called for a ban on fracking.

== Deforestation ==
Significant deforestation occurred in Appalachia around the turn of the twentieth century, with land use rapidly shifting from majority old growth forest to over 70% agricultural land by 1910. This resulted in significant damage to forest ecosystems in the region, soil damage and water pollution from erosion, and increased forest fires. Timber harvesting decreased in the mid twentieth century resulting in significant regrowth of forest, steadily increasing in density and maturity until today.

Deforestation re-emerged as an issue in the late twentieth century. Some resurgence of the timber industry began in the 1980s because of maturing forests, including the use of clearcutting. As of 2007 over 300 square miles of forest had been removed because of MTR mining alone.

Negative impact of the activity should be addressed

Reduced mining frequency should be used to control coal mining. Coal may be recycled and reused to lessen its negative environmental consequences during manufacturing and use. It is possible to reclaim coal mining land and use it for airports, landfills, and golf courses.

== Events ==
=== 1972 Buffalo Creek Disaster ===
In 1972, a slurry pond built by Pittson Coal Company collapsed. In what is known as the Buffalo Creek disaster 130 million gallons of sludge flooded Buffalo Creek. More recently, a waste impoundment owned by Massey burst in Kentucky, flooding nearby streams with 250 tons of coal slurry.

When lawyers attempted to sue Pittson Company, the sole shareholder of the Buffalo mining company, they first had to pierce the corporate veil. Pittson's lawyers filed certain documents with the court to show that, as a shareholder, Pittson was not liable for the disaster because the Buffalo Mining Company was run independently. These documents were minutes of shareholders' and directors' meetings that Pittson's attorneys relied on in their argument that Pittson was a protected shareholder behind the corporate veil. The lawyers for the victims of Buffalo creek were able to pierce the corporate veil when they proved that none of these meetings "had actually taken place."

=== 2000 Kentucky coal slurry spill ===
The Martin County coal slurry spill occurred on October 11, 2000 when the bottom of a coal slurry impoundment owned by Massey Energy in Martin County, Kentucky broke into an abandoned underground mine below. The slurry came out of the mine openings, sending an estimated 306,000,000 US gallons (1.16×109 L; 255,000,000 imp gal) of slurry down two tributaries of the Tug Fork River.

=== 2008 Tennessee fly ash slurry spill ===
The TVA Kingston Fossil Plant coal fly ash slurry spill occurred on December 22, 2008, when an ash dike ruptured at an 84-acre (0.34 km2) solid waste containment area at the Tennessee Valley Authority's Kingston Fossil Plant in Roane County, Tennessee. 1.1 billion US gallons (4,200,000 m3) of coal fly ash slurry was released.

=== 2010 Clearfield County well blowout ===
During exploration of the Marcellus Shale in 2010, a blowout at the Clearfield County well started a 16-hour natural gas leak. Natural gas and wastewater "shot 75 feet into the air," releasing 1 million gallons of brine and gas into the forest according to Bud George.

During the 2010s, the coal industry in Appalachia experienced a decline due to political and economic changes. This industry had been a significant source of employment for the region for many years. However, this decline has had adverse effects on both the environment and economy of the area. Abandoned mines and unreclaimed lands continue to pose environmental risks.

=== 2011 Atgas 2H well blowout and spill ===
In 2011 a study funded by Chesapeake Energy found that the release of fracking fluids from Chesapeake's Atgas 2H well site had not had any long-term negative impact on Pennsylvania groundwater or watersheds. Thousands of gallons of waste fluids spilled onto a farm and streams after the Atgas 2H well in LeRoy Township blew out.

=== 2014 Elk River chemical spill ===
The 2014 Elk River chemical spill occurred on January 9, 2014 when 7,500 gallons of chemicals leaked from a Freedom Industries facility into the Elk River, a tributary of the Kanawha River in West Virginia. The primary chemical, crude MCHM, is a chemical foam used to wash coal and remove impurities. The spill resulted in a temporary “do-not-use" advisory for drinking water affecting up to 300,000 people in the area.

== Environmentalism in Appalachia ==
=== History ===
Environmentalism in Appalachia is generally characterized by opposition to fossil fuel extraction in the area. Much of the environmental movement in Appalachia is rooted in the legacy of resistance to the coal industry by labor unions in the late 1800s and early 1900s. From the 1960s onward environmental groups in the region focused on surface mining as one of the most significant environmental threats in the region. The 1960s and 70s marked a particularly significant resistance, including political organizing, nonviolent direct action, and litigation against fossil fuel companies. This led up to the passing of the Surface Mining Control and Reclamation Act in 1977, which was initially seen as a success by many activists but was poorly enforced.

After the passage of the SMCRA many environmental organizations previously focusing on surface mining broadened their focus to more social issues. Increased deforestation in the 1980s led to organizing against clearcutting. Public attention was brought back to surface mining after the popularization of Mountaintop Removal mining in the 1990s began facing resistance. The origins of an environmental justice movement in Appalachia began with primarily women resisting the practice because of health risks in their communities. Direct action techniques saw a resurgence beginning in what was labeled "Mountain Justice Summer" in 2005 and succeeded in bringing the issue to international attention.

=== The Environmental Justice Movement ===
Environmental justice has been identified by scholars as a movement that acknowledged the disproportionate effects of environmental damage and toxic contamination on the poor and people of color. Though much of the focus on environmental justice has been placed in urban areas this lens has also been applied to the Appalachian region, which has long been associated with poverty in the general American public. This perception was further solidified when region was targeted by Nixon's "War on Poverty" campaign.

Because of the environmental and health effects of fossil fuel extraction in the area, Appalachia has been identified by some as an "energy sacrifice zone." Kentucky activist Joe Begley characterized the injustice in the region in a 1999 interview saying, "People here live on top of a gold mine, and they're starving to death. They live on top of a coal mine, and they're freezing to death.” Environmental justice groups are often community grassroots organizations that combined environmentalism with issues of social equality. Many contemporary environmental organizations in the area fit this description, such as the Mountain Justice group, formed in opposition to Mountain Top Removal mining. MTR has been used as an example of environmental injustice in the region. This relates both to the disproportionate level of chronic health issues in regions where it is present and thousands of lost jobs resulting from the less labor intensive nature of the practice.

To achieve environmental justice, individuals must have the right to a clean and healthy environment, as well as the ability to participate in decisions that impact their surroundings. Public policy must be unbiased and respectful towards all peoples, without discrimination. Prevention of harm to both human health and the environment is also crucial. Full access to information and opportunities to participate in decision-making processes is a necessity. The Environmental Justice Movement has made significant strides in promoting the intersection of environmental issues and social justice, but there is still much work to be done to ensure equal access to a clean and healthy environment for all communities.

=== Opposition ===
Despite the presence of environmental activism, there is also significant resistance to environmentalism in the region that is linked to political conservatism Research has shown that resistance is rooted in a strong connection between coal mining and perceptions of the identity and importance of the region and the fear of the government regulations encroaching on personal freedoms. Additionally, many in the region are financially dependent on coal mining and speaking out against the industry could mean losing their livelihood.

== See also ==
- Appalachia § Logging
- Centralia Mine Fire
- Johnstown Flood
- List of natural gas and oil production accidents in the United States
- List of Superfund sites in Kentucky
- List of Superfund sites in Pennsylvania
- List of Superfund sites in Tennessee
- List of Superfund sites in West Virginia
- Mountaintop Removal Mining
