= Rising Appalachia =

American Appalachian folk music group

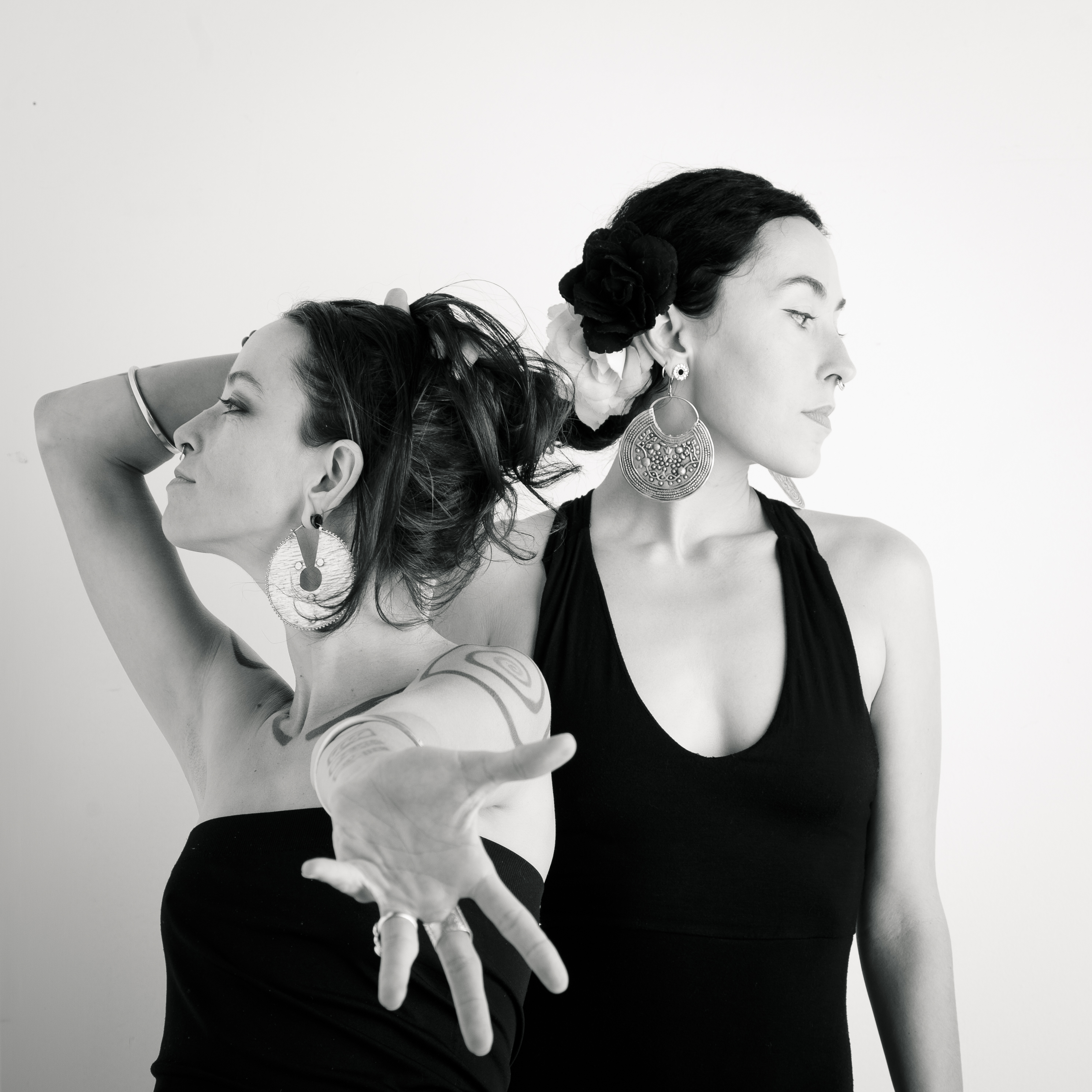
- Sisters Leah & Chloe Smith of Rising Appalachia

Background information
- Origin: Atlanta, Georgia
- Genres: Appalachian folk; roots; world; soul
- Years active: 2005–present
- Label: Independent
- Members: Leah Song; Chloe Smith; Biko Casini; David Brown; Arouna Diarra; Duncan Wickel
- Website: risingappalachia.com

Rising Appalachia is an American Appalachian folk music group, led by multi-instrumentalist sisters Leah Song and Chloe Smith. Their music is rooted in the landscapes of Atlanta, New Orleans, and the southern Blue Ridge Mountains of Appalachia. The group blends a diverse range of instruments, including banjos, fiddle, cello, upright bass, baritone guitar, djembe, and world percussion, as well as styles, including Americana, world, folk, and soul music.

Rising Appalachia is noted for their nonconformity to the mainstream music industry. From the outset the Smith sisters independently managed and financed their music. Their musical career began with a gift of music for their close circle. The unexpectedly positive reception spurred them to establish Rising Appalachia as a group.

The collective's identity has evolved through various phases, including a stint as R.I.S.E., during which they released the live album Evolutions in Sound. They worked to unite art with activism and community engagement, which led to the inception of the Rise Collective: a diverse assembly of performers, educators, activists, and artists. This collaborative effort worked in various artistic media, from acro-yoga to fire spinning and sound workshops.

Rising Appalachia has played musical festivals across the globe. They have released albums such as the crowd-funded Filthy Dirty South as well as Leylines.

== History ==
=== Early days ===
In 2005, sisters Leah and Chloe Smith decided to record their first album, Leah and Chloe, in the basement studio of a friend in downtown Atlanta, Georgia. The album was meant as a gift for family and friends but they received so much support for it that they decided to officially start a band called Rising Appalachia. The sisters moved to New Orleans in 2006, about a year after Hurricane Katrina.

In the early days, the sisters busked in the French Quarter of New Orleans and elsewhere. They began to create their own interpretation of Appalachian music which brought together folk, soul, hip-hop, classical, southern gospel and other styles based on their upbringing on traditional Appalachian string band music. They released their second album, Scale Down in 2007.

On June 29, 2008 the group played their last show under the name Rising Appalachia during Concrete Pandemonium III at the Eyedrum Art Gallery in Atlanta before it was changed to R.I.S.E.

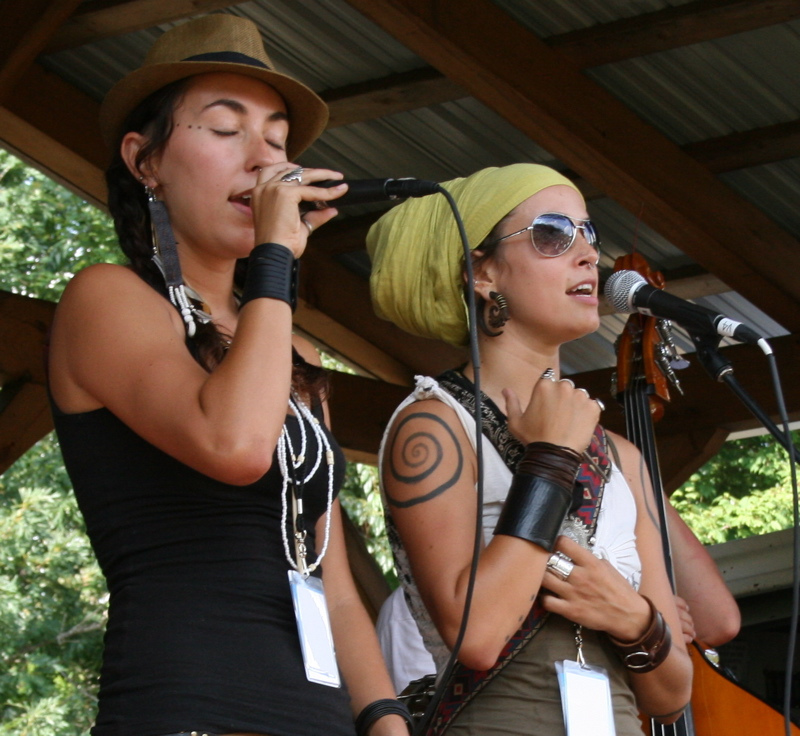
Chloe and Leah Smith at FloydFest 2010

=== R.I.S.E. (2008-2010) and the Rise Collective ===
As R.I.S.E. they released their first live album Evolutions in Sound: Live in 2008, the only album released under this name. In February 2010 the band announced they would reclaim the original name of the band, Rising Appalachia, but would incorporate RISE in the name of a supporting project, the Rise Collective.

The Rise Collective combines lyrics with diverse artistic collaborations. It consists of a crew of global performers, activists, youth educators, dancers, circus artists, yoginis, acrobatics, fire spinners, poets, aerialists, cultural workers and others who perform at music festivals, rallies and street parties and hold sound education workshops at youth centers, schools, prisons and other locations. The Rise Collective activities include acro-yoga, aerial performance, fire spinning, sound workshops, yoga, meditation, and youth education.

Together with the music of Rising Appalachia, the collective is used to support many of the Smith sisters' community-based projects uniting the arts and justice. Having themselves been community activists during their travels, Leah and Chloe Smith want their art to also be a source of activism, as well as of cultural development.

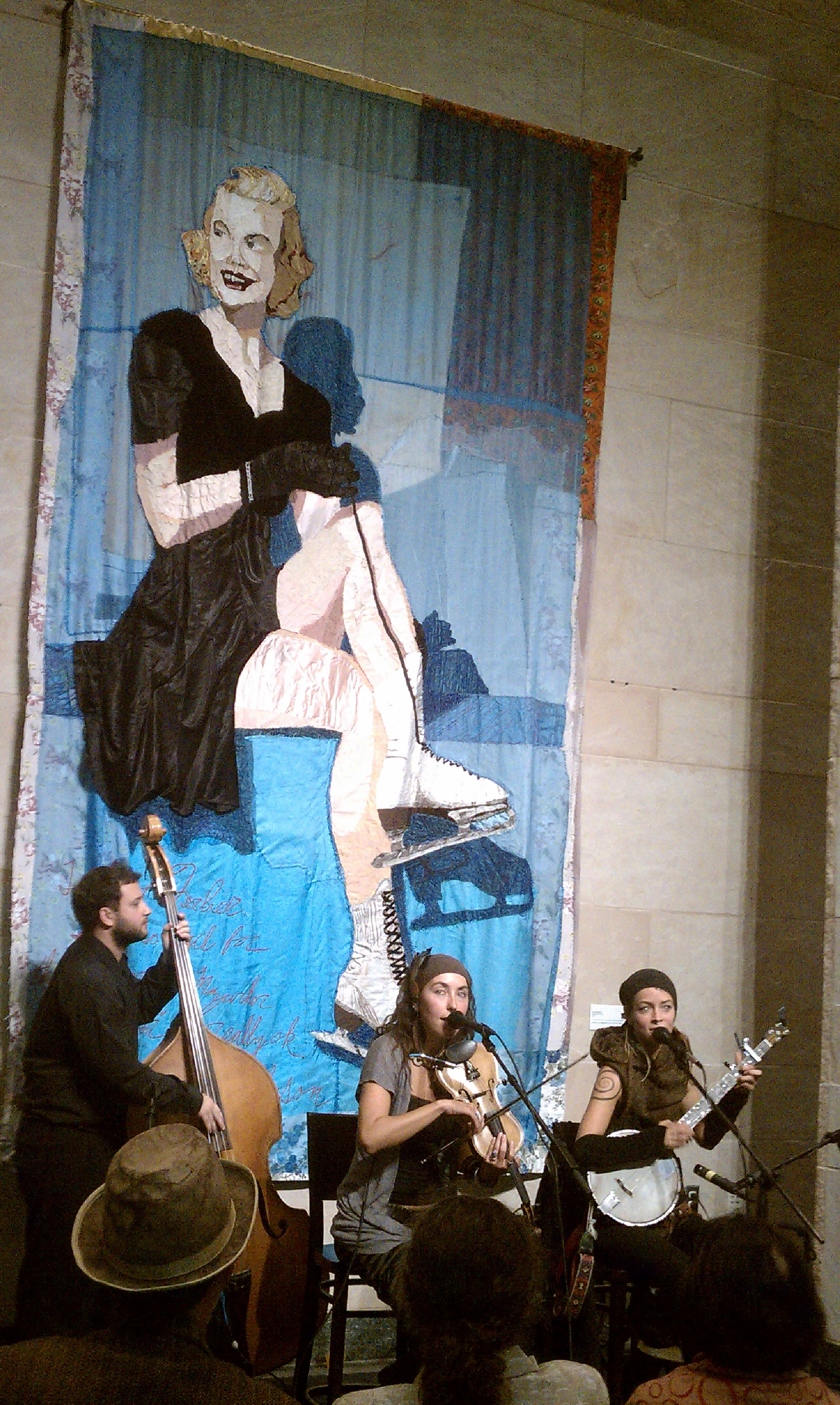
Rising Appalachia at The Ogden, New Orleans on November 11, 2011

=== The Sails of Self (2010) ===
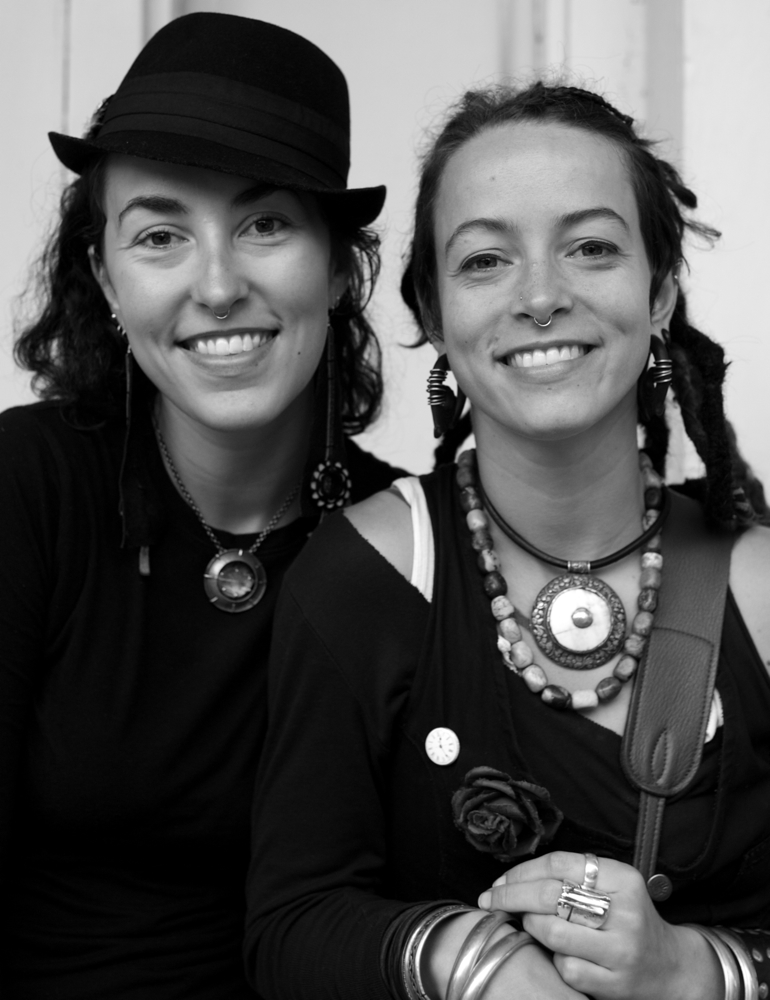
Sisters Chloe and Leah Smith in New Orleans, 2010

2010 brought a return to the band's original name and the release of their third studio album, The Sails of Self. The band expanded, with percussionist Biko Casini and bassist David Brown officially joining the band for this album and tour.

=== Kickstarter-funded Filthy Dirty South (2012) ===
In 2011, the band raised a total of $11,180.00 within one month for their next album, Filthy Dirty South, on the crowd funding web site Kickstarter. They released Filthy Dirty South, their fourth studio album, in 2012.

Thandiwe Ogbonna, writing for No Depression, said "Filthy Dirty South is an overall outstanding work of clever musicianship. A tour of world sounds that could be scattered and disjointed is very skilfully executed with a pleasant flow." Dan Levenson reviewed the album, along with the band's two previous studio albums, in the January 2015 issue of Banjo Newsletter, taking great interest in Leah Song's distinctive "clawhammer" banjo style.

In 2013, in collaboration with The Human Experience, they produced their first remix album, Soul Visions.

=== Slow Music Movement and the Wider Circles Rail Tour (2015) ===
On July 17, 2015, Rising Appalachia released their fifth studio album, Wider Circles. Leah Song coined the term "Slow Music Movement" while preparing for a TedX talk. During their Wider Circles Rail Tour, the band travelled by Amtrak train. Song connected this with the "Slow Music Movement", which she described as exploring the question as to how music can be a public service, saying:

We want to have relationships with the farmers and the food of each region and also to have a relationship with different educational initiatives and non-profits. We have a policy that at each show at least two non-profits are welcome, invited — non-profits or educational initiatives, arts justice projects — to the show to set up tables and let the audiences know, as well as ourselves, what's going on locally.

John Malkin, writing for Spirituality & Health Magazine noted that "The inviting songs of Wider Circles focus on community, gratitude, and healing." Desdemona Dallas, reviewing for Lost in Sound, noted that "Songs 'Medicine' and 'Oh Death' light upon the Smith sisters’ wordsmithing ways as slam poets." Thandiwe Ogbonna, writing for No Depression, said

The talents of Biko Casini (world percussion) and David Brown (stand-up bass/baritone guitar) pair with Leah and Chloe's signature vocal harmonies and banjo/fiddle duets to explore elements of folk, jazz, and soul and topics ranging from mountaintop removal to herbal medicine.

=== Permaculture Action Network and the Fertile Grounds Tour (2016) ===
The band chose the name "Fertile Grounds" for their 2016 tour to celebrate their new partnership with the Permaculture Action Network. In an interview, Chloe Smith stated that the band would be "hosting a series of Permaculture Action Days in association with a number of our performance dates with the goal of helping to connect our audiences with tangible on-the-ground action and education."

=== Alive (2017) ===
Rising Appalachia's first live album, Alive, was released on September 29, 2017. The release was covered by Kath Galasso of OnStage Magazine, who wrote that "Alive moves from traditional to contemporary to spiritual smoothly, never forgetting the global narrative."

The album was featured by The Spill Magazine, along with an interview with Leah Song. It was also reviewed by Erick Mertz for the UK magazine Bearded, who wrote "In total, the performance is complete. Banter between songs keeps the fire burning. Rising Appalachia allows the performance to take on its own energy, up and down, like the life cycle of joys and sorrows that it aims to replicate," although he was disappointed at the lack of variety and had hoped for more of a "political edge."

Alive was named an album of the year by The Arts Desk.

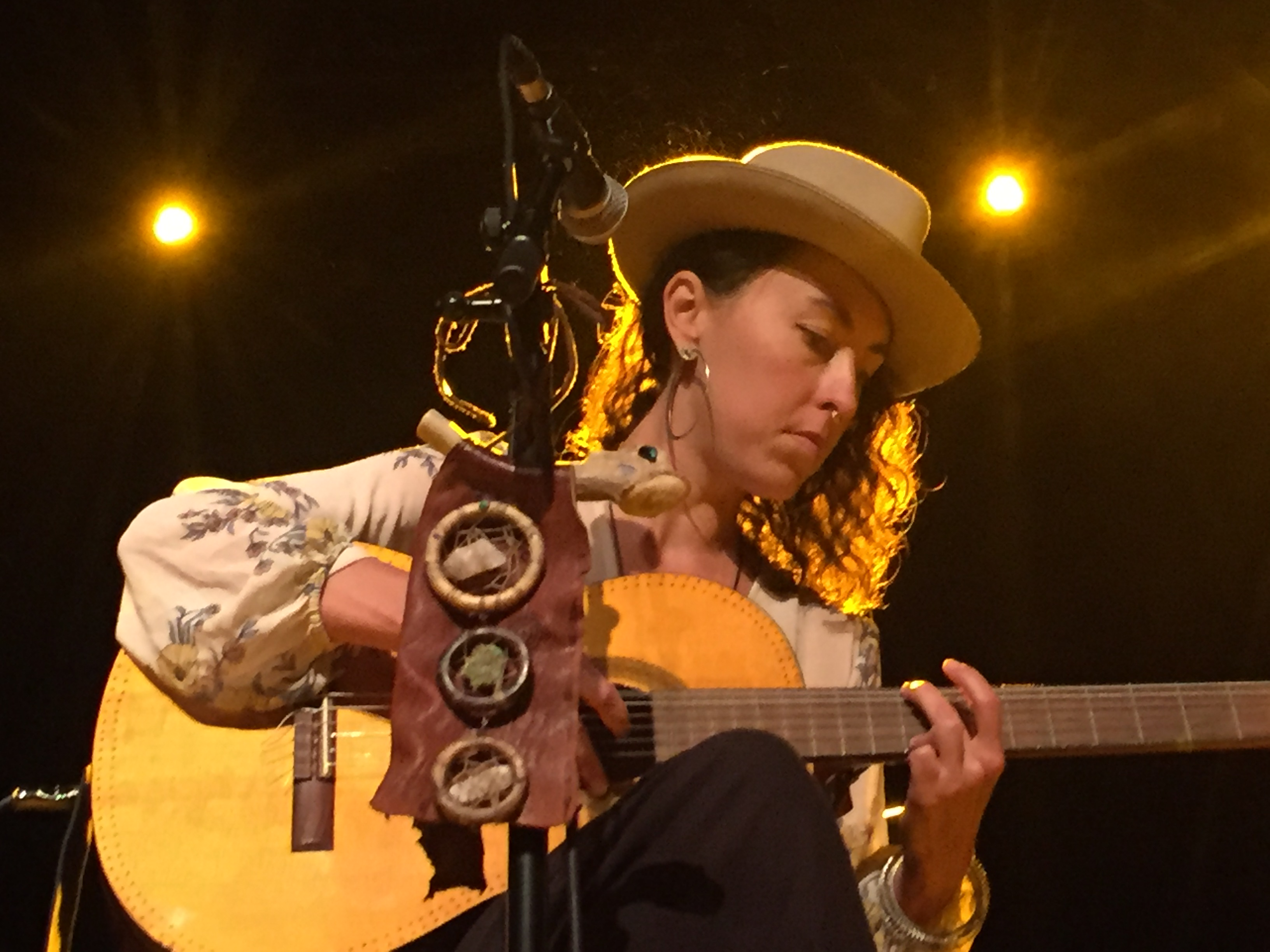
Chloe Smith, Resilient Tour, Atlanta, 2018

=== Resilient tour (2018) ===
The single "Resilient" was released on May 1, 2018. The video, which features dancers Quentin Robinson, Justin Conte, Lukas van der Fecht, and Amy Secada, was reviewed by Bob Boilen for NPR Music's All Songs TV, and by Steph Castor for the June 2018 issue of Girl Guitar Magazine.

The Resilient tour began on May 3 in Thornville, Ohio at Nelson Ledges Quarry Park. The tour included performances at the Shakori Hills Grassroots Festival in Silk Hope, North Carolina, the Lake Eden Arts Festival (LEAF) in Black Mountain, North Carolina, the Music on the Mesa Festival in Taos, New Mexico, and the Winnipeg Folk Festival.

During this tour, Rolling Stone described the band's work as "Protest music for the modern age, bolstered by delicate, skillful musicianship and otherworldly vocal harmonies."

=== Leylines tour (2019) ===
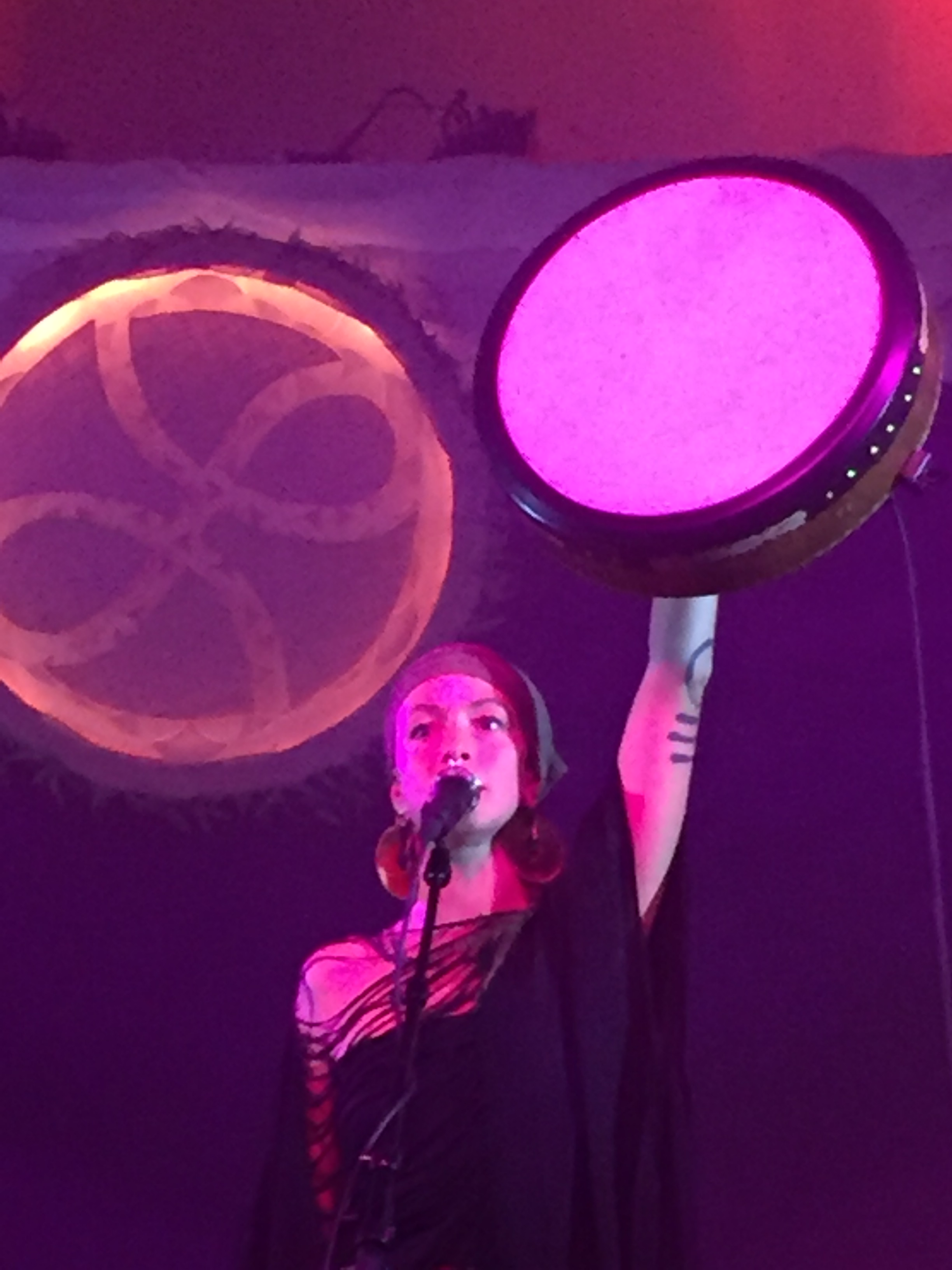
Leah Song at LEAF, May 11, 2018

Rising Appalachia released their sixth studio album, Leylines, on May 3, 2019, and the tour to promote it began on May 5 at One Eyed Jacks in New Orleans. Tour stops included the Kerrville Folk Festival in Texas, the Esalen Midsummer Festival in Big Sur, California, the Evolve Festival in Fredericton, Canada, and the Sisters Folk Festival in Sisters, Oregon.

The theme of Leylines is interconnectedness. In an interview, Chloe Smith said that the word leylines "alludes to magnetic points of spirit, energy, history, and power in various parts of the world ... We wanted to weave lines of connections aurally with both traditional music from those places as well as contemporary lyrics..."

Leylines was ranked on the Billboard Top Heatseekers chart, peaking at No. 22 for the week ending May 18, 2019. The album was reviewed by George Graham in The Graham Album Review. The song "Harmonize" was released early as a music video which was featured by Rolling Stone. The song "Cuckoo" was featured in Paste, the song "Sunny Days" was featured in Relix, and the song "Speak Out" was featured in Brooklyn Vegan. The final track, "Resilient", is a full band version of the single first released in 2018 as a duo performance and music video.

=== Releases and online show (2020) ===
Rising Appalachia released a new music video, "Stand Like an Oak," on Earth Day, April 22. Regarding her reasons for writing this song, Chloe wrote that she did it "for a loved one going through the wave and arc of depression and anxiety, someone whom I wanted to sing a reminder to, to find her roots and footing when the wind blows strong. Mental health is a gripping mountain for so many people to climb, and this song honors that journey as well as the people who pull us up out of it." Leah wrote that "[it] is a song to remind us of our innate sturdiness and deep roots in this vital dark soil of Earth; the innate presence and stability of the Oaktree as our model and muse of calmness in the great storms."

In collaboration with David Brown's Castanea, a "Resilient Remix" music video was released on May 15, which was featured on Folk Roots Radio "Episode 515: We're All About The Music!" In June, in collaboration with Dirtwire, the single "Pulse" was released.

The band launched a Patreon presence on August 1. Later in August the band announced the release of a music video of "Pulse."

The full band playing a livestream concert on December 15. This concert was released as a live album, Live from New Orleans at Preservation Hall, in November 2022.

Also during this period, Leah and Chloe, together with Tina Malia, Ayla Nereo, and Marya Stark, formed an a cappella spirit-folk ensemble, Starling Arrow.

=== The Lost Mystique of Being in the Know (2021) ===
The band dropped a surprise album, The Lost Mystique of Being in the Know, on May 21, 2021. It is their seventh studio album, and was reviewed by Jim Shahen in The Journal of Roots Music, who wrote that "it's a testament to their exuberance and spontaneous creativity." It was also reviewed by Madeline Crone for American Songwriter, who wrote that "this project is a lot more abstract than their previous discography," and by Mike Davies for the UK's folk radio, who reviewed each song in detail and concluded "undoubtedly one of the most intoxicating musical experiences you'll have this year." Doug Deloach reviewed it for Songlines, giving it five stars and writing, "Across nine tracks culled from a one-day recording session after ten months of COVID-induced isolation, Rising Appalachia have delivered one of 2021's sweetest world music albums."

== Members ==
- Leah Song – vocals, poetics, banjo, fiddle, kalimba, bodhrán, tinkly percussive things
- Chloe Smith – vocals, fiddle, banjo, washboard, kalimba, percussion
- Biko Casini – djembe, bara, ngoni, congas, percussion
- David Brown – upright bass, baritone guitar, banjo
- Arouna Diarra – ngoni, balafon, talking drum, percussion
- Duncan Wickel – cello, fiddle

== Awards and recognition ==
- Atlanta's Best Folk Act (by Creative Loafing)
- Alive was named an "Album of the Year 2017" (by The Arts Desk)

== Discography ==
=== Albums ===
- Rising Appalachia (2006). Leah and Chloe (CD). CD Baby/Rising Appalachia.
- Rising Appalachia (2007). Scale Down (CD). CD Baby/Unwound.
- Rising Appalachia (2010). The Sails of Self (CD). CD Baby/Rising Appalachia.
- Rising Appalachia (2012). Filthy Dirty South (CD). CD Baby/Rising Appalachia.
- Rising Appalachia (2015). Wider Circles (CD). Rising Appalachia.
- Rising Appalachia (2017). Alive (CD). Rising Appalachia. (live album)
- Rising Appalachia (2019). Leylines (CD). Rising Appalachia.
- Rising Appalachia (2021). The Lost Mystique of Being in the Know (CD). Rising Appalachia.
- Rising Appalachia (2022). Live from New Orleans at Preservation Hall (Digital). Rising Appalachia.
- Rising Appalachia (2024). Folk & Anchor (CD). Rising Appalachia.

==== As R.I.S.E ====
- R.I.S.E. (Rising Appalachia) (2008). Evolutions in Sound: Live (CD). CD Baby/R.I.S.E. (live album).

==== Remix albums ====
- Soul Visions (2013, in collaboration with The Human Experience).
- Remast (2018, in collaboration with Castanea, band member David Brown's side project).

=== Contributions ===
- Rising Appalachia; The Human Experience (2013d). "Sunu". The Bloom Series Vol 1: Fundamental Frequencies. Muti Music.

=== DVDs ===
- Rising Appalachia (2012c). Live at Echo Mountain (DVD). CD Baby.

=== Interviews and talks ===
- Rising Appalachia (2015d). Wider Circles: an intimate conversation and collection (video). Deepthink.
- VOA Music (April 20, 2016). Music Alley Spotlight: Rising Appalachia (video). VOA Music.
- Paste Magazine (February 16, 2022). Rising Appalachia live at Paste Studio on the Road: Gem & Jam Festival (video). Paste Magazine.

=== Live broadcasts ===
- Rising Appalachia (May 1, 2015c). Live in the Airstream (video). Taos, NM: KNCE.

=== Music videos ===
- Rising Appalachia (2010a). Scale Down (video). Scott McKibben Photography and Captain Crazy Productions.
- Rising Appalachia (2010b). Zavidi Me Lalino (video). Captain Crazy TV.
- Rising Appalachia (2011a). Nobody's Fault But Mine (video). With Garrett Turner. W.B. Yeats Foundation.
- Rising Appalachia (2011b). Sunu (video). Directed by Chad Hess. Chad Hess Production.
- Rising Appalachia (2011c). Sunu #2 (video). Rising Appalachia.
- Rising Appalachia (2011d). Swoon (video). Directed by Chad Hess. Chad Hess Production.
- Rising Appalachia (2012a). Across the Blue Ridge Mountains (video). Rising Appalachia.
- Rising Appalachia (2012b). Don't Miss Your Water (video). Rising Appalachia.
- Rising Appalachia (2013a). Closer to the Edge (video). Directed by Chad Hess. Chad Hess Production.
- Rising Appalachia (2013b). Filthy Dirty South (video). Scott McKibben Photography.
- Rising Appalachia (2014a). Fly Around My Pretty Lil' Miss (video). Image Digital Media.
- Rising Appalachia (2015a). Medicine (video). Jeremy Jensen Media.
- Rising Appalachia (2015b). Wider Circles Live Cut on the Train (video). Rising Appalachia.
- Rising Appalachia (2018). Resilient (video). Rising Appalachia.
- Rising Appalachia (2019a). Harmonize (video). Rising Appalachia.
- Rising Appalachia (2019b). Cuckoo (video). Rising Appalachia.
- Rising Appalachia (2020a). Stand like an Oak (video). Rising Appalachia.
- Rising Appalachia + Dirtwire (2020). Pulse (video). Rising Appalachia.
- Rising Appalachia (2021a). Rising Appalachia LIVE (video). Soul Land Music Series: Songs & Stories Inspired by Ram Dass. Baba Ram Dass.
- Rising Appalachia (2022a). The Lime Tree (video). By Trevor Hall. Rising Appalachia.
- Rising Appalachia (2022b). LIVE from Preservation Hall (video). Rising Appalachia.

== See also ==
- Appalachian Center for Wilderness Medicine
- Environmental issues in Appalachia
- Environmental justice and coal mining in Appalachia
- Social and economic stratification in Appalachia
