= List of folk musicians =

This is a list of folk musicians, sorted by country, with some sub-categories based on region, style, or gender. Not all are strictly folk musicians, but all are renowned for their contributions to folk music.

== Albania ==
- Eli Fara
- Fatime Sokoli
- Nikollë Nikprelaj

== Andean ==
- Savia Andina

== Argentina ==
- Huldreslåt
- Mercedes Sosa
- Eduardo Falu
- Jorge Cafrune
- Ariel Ramirez
- Los Fronterizos
- Pescado Rabioso

== Armenia ==
- Djivan Gasparyan
- Udi Hrant
- Gor Mkhitarian

== Australia ==
- Paul Kelly
- Blue King Brown
- Eric Bogle
- Sarah Blasko
- Boy And Bear
- Kasey Chambers
- Slim Dusty
- Steve Gadd
- Roaring Jack
- Matthew John Corby
- Vance Joy
- Lisa Mitchell
- Siobhan Owen
- The Seekers
- Judy Small
- Angus & Julia Stone
- Hana Stretton
- The Waifs

=== Indigenous Australians ===
- Kerrianne Cox
- David Hudson
- Archie Roach

== Azerbaijan ==
=== Ashik ===
- Ali Ekber Çiçek
- Aşık Mahzuni Şerif
- Aşık Khanlar
- Aşık Veysel
- Neşet Ertaş
- Aşiq Ələsgər
- Jivani
- Sayat-Nova
- Karacaoğlan
- Kul Nesîmî
- Pir Sultan Abdal

== Bangladesh ==
- Lalon
- Hason Raja
- Abbasuddin Ahmed
- Shah Abdul Karim
- Momtaz Begum
- Habib Wahid
- Farida Parveen
- Salma Akhter
- Bari Siddiqui
- Ferdausi Rahman
- Abdur Rahman Boyati

== Bolivia ==
- Asunta Limpias de Parada

== Brazil ==
- Anavitória
- Cartola

== Bulgaria ==
- The Bisserov Sisters
- Bistritsa Babi
- Bulgarka Junior Quartet
- Pirin Folk Ensemble
- Svetoglas
- Trio Bulgarka

== Canada ==
=== A–M ===
- Susan Aglukark
- The Band
- Del Barber
- Kim Barlow
- Be Good Tanyas
- Heather Bishop
- La Bolduc
- La Bottine Souriante
- Oscar Brand
- Tim Chaisson
- City and Colour
- Bruce Cockburn
- Leonard Cohen
- Stompin' Tom Connors
- The Cottars
- Les Colocs
- Crash Vegas
- Bonnie Dobson
- Luke Doucet
- Wilf Doyle
- The Duhks
- Fred Eaglesmith
- Kathleen Edwards
- Stephen Fearing
- Ferron
- Serge Fiori
- Jeremy Fisher
- Flying Bulgar Klezmer Band
- David Francey
- Ginalina
- The Grapes of Wrath
- Great Big Sea
- Great Lake Swimmers
- Norm Hacking
- Sarah Harmer
- Harmonium
- Hart-Rouge
- Wade Hemsworth
- The Hidden Cameras
- Veda Hille
- Ian & Sylvia
- Reid Jamieson
- James Keelaghan
- Mary Jane Lamond
- k.d. lang
- Abigail Lapell
- Leah
- Gordon Lightfoot
- Old Man Luedecke
- Ashley MacIsaac
- Buddy MacMaster
- Natalie MacMaster
- Rita MacNeil
- Kate & Anna McGarrigle
- Loreena McKennitt
- Murray McLauchlan
- Lynn Miles
- Alan Mills
- Joni Mitchell

=== N–Z ===
- Jory Nash
- Faith Nolan
- The Paperboys
- Evalyn Parry
- Po' Girl
- Le Rêve du Diable
- Garnet Rogers
- Nathan Rogers
- Stan Rogers
- Buffy Sainte-Marie
- Ron Sexsmith
- Rae Spoon
- The Travellers
- Lucie Blue Tremblay
- Valdy
- Le Vent du Nord
- The Wailin' Jennys
- Loudon Wainwright III
- Dawud Wharnsby
- Jesse Winchester
- Ken Yates
- Neil Young

== Chile ==
- Víctor Jara
- Violeta Parra

== Czech Republic ==
=== Moravia ===
- Karel Kryl
- Jaromír Nohavica

== Denmark ==
- Helene Blum
- Jullie Hjetland
- Rune T. Kidde
- Nina & Frederik

== Estonia ==
- Liisu Mägi

== Finland ==
- Timo Alakotila
- Angelit
- Frigg
- Gjallarhorn
- Islaja
- Arto Järvelä
- Mauno Järvelä
- JPP
- Konsta Jylhä
- Sari Kaasinen
- Maria Kalaniemi
- Sanna Kurki-Suonio
- Loituma
- Värttinä
- Jenny Wilhelms
- Wimme

== France ==
- Sacha Distel
- Maxime Le Forestier
- Malicorne
- Gus Viseur

=== Brittany ===
- Dan Ar Braz
- Jean Chocun
- Jean-Paul Corbineau
- Jean-Louis Jossic
- Kornog
- Alan Stivell
- Tri Yann
- Nolwenn Leroy

== Greece ==
- Aristidis Moschos
- Chronis Aidonidis
- Haris Alexiou
- Rosa Eskenazi
- Glykeria
- Mariza Koch
- Marika Papagika
- Giorgos Papasideris
- Domna Samiou

== Hungary ==
- Ági Szalóki
- Márta Sebestyén
- Muzsikás
- Zoltan Kodály
- The Moon and the Nightspirit

== Iceland ==
- Of Monsters & Men

== India ==
=== Indian female folk singers ===
==== A–G ====
- Ila Arun
- Malini Awasthi
- Allah Jilai Bai
- Gulab Bai
- Teejan Bai
- Dipali Barthakur
- Parvathy Baul
- Chinnaponnu
- Anima Choudhury
- Anupama Deshpande
- Bindhyabasini Devi
- Gambhari Devi
- Vinjamuri Seetha Devi
- Shreya Ghoshal
- Dolly Guleria

==== H–S ====
- Vishaka Hari
- Abhaya Hiranmayi
- Jagmohan Kaur
- Kollangudi Karuppayee
- Jagjit Kaur
- Parkash Kaur
- Ranjit Kaur
- Surinder Kaur
- Anitha Kuppusamy
- Belli Lalitha
- Swaran Lata (singer)
- Hildamit Lepcha
- Kumari Kanchan Dinkerao Mail
- Manpreet Akhtar
- Lopamudra Mitra
- Paravai Muniyamma
- Rockstar Ramani Ammal
- Vithabai Bhau Mang Narayangaonkar
- Vijayalakshmi Navaneethakrishnan
- Nooran Sisters
- Pratima Barua Pandey
- Kalpana Patowary
- Malika Pukhraj
- Rajnigandha Shekhawat
- Meena Rana
- Sheetal Sathe
- Thanjai Selvi
- Sharda Sinha
- Sithara (singer)

==== T–Z ====
- Vangapandu Usha
- Vimalakka
- Hira Devi Waiba
- Navneet Aditya Waiba

=== Indian male folk singers ===
==== A–G ====
- A.R. Akela
- Abdul Alim (folk singer)
- Guda Anjaiah
- Sukhraj Aujla
- Pammi Bai
- Papon (singer)
- Rasamayi Balakishan
- Patthe Bapurao
- Paban Das Baul
- Bhopa
- S. D. Burman
- Hemant Chauhan
- Anthony Daasan
- Jhusia Damai
- Bipul Chettri
- Gaddar
- Bhikhudan Gadhvi
- Karnail Gill
- Habib Painter

==== H–S ====
- Hans Raj Hans
- Balappa Hukkeri
- Lal Chand Yamla Jatt
- Kalekuri Prasad
- Avtar Singh Kang
- H. R. Keshava Murthy
- Ateeq Hussain Khan
- Kachra Khan
- Sabar Koti
- Khagen Mahanta
- Asa Singh Mastana
- Morup Namgyal
- Naranappa Uppoor
- Shishir Parkhie
- Rameshwar Pathak
- Adarsh Rathore
- Wilfy Rebimbus
- Devdatta Sable
- Shahir Krishnarao Sable
- Master Saleem
- Purna Das Baul
- Satinder Sartaaj
- Madan Gopal Singh
- Ghulam Hassan Sofi
- Deshapati Srinivas

==== T–Z ====
- Prahlad Tipanya
- Vitthal Umap
- Wadali Brothers
- Warsi Brothers

== Ireland ==
- ALT
- Altan
- Mary Black
- Luka Bloom
- The Bothy Band
- Paul Brady
- Kevin Burke
- Karan Casey
- The Chieftains
- The Clancy Brothers
- Liam Clancy
- Willie Clancy
- Clannad
- Michael Coleman
- The Corrs
- The Cranberries
- De Danann
- Dervish
- Cara Dillon
- Johnny Doran
- The Dubliners
- Séamus Egan
- Energy Orchard
- Seamus Ennis
- Brian Finnegan
- Orla Gartland
- Frankie Gavin
- Goats Don't Shave
- Len Graham
- Lisa Hannigan
- Frank Harte
- Martin Hayes
- Andy Irvine
- The Johnstons
- Dolores Keane
- Frankie Kennedy
- Sinéad Lohan
- Lúnasa
- Dónal Lunny
- Tommy Makem
- Michael McGoldrick
- Matt Molloy
- Christy Moore
- James Morrison
- Van Morrison
- Johnny Moynihan
- Máire Ní Chathasaigh
- Muireann Nic Amhlaoibh
- Maura O'Connell
- Liam O'Flynn
- Sally Oldfield
- Patrick Street
- Planxty
- The Pogues
- Fionn Regan
- Damien Rice
- Micho Russell
- Sharon Shannon
- Davy Spillane
- Paddy Tunney
- The Waterboys
- Andy White
- The Wolfe Tones

== Israel ==
- Chava Alberstein
- David Broza
- Bradley Fish
- Mark Eliyahu
- Aviva Semadar

== Italy ==
- Adamo
- Carlo Buti
- Francesco Guccini
- Fabrizio De André

== Japan ==
- Rinken Band

== Mexico ==
- Joan Sebastian

== Netherlands ==
- Omnia

== New Zealand ==
- Avalanche City
- Martin Curtis
- Flight of the Conchords
- Luke Hurley
- Bic Runga
- Mahinarangi Tocker
- Topp Twins
- Marcus Turner

== Nigeria ==
- Brymo

== Norway ==
- Frigg
- Myllarguten
- Annbjørg Lien
- Chateau Neuf Spelemannslag

== Peru ==
- Wayno

== Philippines ==
- Freddie Aguilar

== Romania ==
- Veta Biriș

== Russian Federation ==
- Nadezhda Babkina
- Jeanne Bichevskaya
- Marina Devyatova
- Nadezhda Kadysheva
- Sasha Lazard
- Maria Mordasova
- Pelageya
- Ivan Rebroff
- Maria Egorovna Rykina
- Lidiya Ruslanova
- Terem Quartet
- Varvara
- Olga Voronets
- Yuta (singer)
- Zolotoe Koltso
- Lyudmila Zykina

== Slovenia ==
- Slavko Avsenik
- Atomik Harmonik

== South Africa ==
- Ladysmith Black Mambazo
- Mahotella Queens
- Miriam Makeba
- David Kramer

== Spain ==
- La Musgaña
- Llan de Cubel
- Hevia
- Luar Na Lubre
- Jorge Pardo
- Carlos Núñez
- Radio Tarifa
- Narciso Yepes

== Sweden ==
- First aid kit
- Francis
- Frifot
- Garmarna
- Per Gudmundson
- Emma Härdelin
- Hedningarna
- Pehr Hörberg
- Åsa Jinder
- Sofia Karlsson
- Hållbus Totte Mattson
- Ale Möller
- Anders Norudde
- Swåp
- The Tallest Man On Earth
- Roger Tallroth
- Triakel
- Väsen
- Lena Willemark

== Tibet ==
- Yungchen Lhamo

== Turkey ==
- Altın Gün
- Aşık Veysel
- Güler Duman
- Muhlis Akarsu
- Belkis Akkale
- Selda Bağcan
- Ali Ekber Cicek
- Nesimi Çimen
- Musa Eroğlu
- Sabahat Akkiraz
- Lalezar Ensemble
- Musa Eroğlu
- Neşet Ertaş
- Hasret Gültekin
- Udi Hrant
- Ahmet Kaya
- Erkan Oğur
- Arif Sağ
- Baba Zula

== Tuva ==
- Huun-Huur-Tu
- Kongar-ol Ondar

== Ukraine ==
- Taisia Povaliy

== United Kingdom ==
=== England ===
==== A–M ====
- Mike Absalom
- Harvey Andrews
- Joan Armatrading
- Frankie Armstrong
- Badly Drawn Boy
- Roy Bailey
- James Bay
- Peter Bellamy
- Birdy
- Blowzabella
- Jon Boden
- Bombay Bicycle Club
- Billy Bragg
- Anne Briggs
- Jake Bugg
- Vashti Bunyan
- Eliza Carthy
- Martin Carthy
- Jim Causley
- Dolly Collins
- Shirley Collins
- Coope Boyes and Simpson
- Pete Cooper
- Copper family
- Harry Cox
- Andy Cutting
- Sandy Denny
- Dodie
- Lonnie Donegan
- Nick Drake
- Barry Dransfield
- Nigel Eaton
- Edward II
- Emmy the Great
- George Ezra
- Fairport Convention
- Newton Faulkner
- Flook
- Chris Foster
- Jo Freya
- Vin Garbutt
- Goblin Band
- Davey Graham
- David Gray
- Clive Gregson
- John Wesley Harding
- Bella Hardy
- Roy Harper
- Boo Hewerdine
- Robyn Hitchcock
- Ben Howard
- Ashley Hutchings
- Bert Jansch
- Nic Jones
- Wizz Jones
- Fred Jordan
- Sandra Kerr
- William Kimber
- John Kirkpatrick
- Chris Leslie
- Bert Lloyd
- Jez Lowe
- Kirsty MacColl
- Laura Marling
- John Martyn
- Iain Matthews
- Kirsty McGee
- Ralph McTell
- Pete Morton
- Mumford and Sons

==== N–Z ====
- Simon Nicol
- Old Swan Band
- Beth Orton
- Oysterband
- Roo Panes
- Passenger
- Brian Peters
- Maddy Prior
- John Renbourn
- Lucy Rose
- Saul Rose
- Kate Rusby
- Martin Simpson
- Slow Club
- John Spiers
- The Staves
- Steeleye Span
- Cat Stevens
- Stornoway
- The Story
- Joe Summers
- Dave Swarbrick
- Sam Sweeney
- June Tabor
- John Tams
- Jeremy Taylor
- TESS
- Scan Tester
- Jake Thackray
- Richard Thompson
- Teddy Thompson
- Frank Turner
- Karen Tweed
- Uiscedwr
- Ward Thomas
- Lal Waterson
- Norma Waterson
- The Watersons
- Lewis Watson
- Whippersnapper
- Roger Wilson
- Chris Wood
- The Young Tradition

==== Cornwall ====
- Dalla
- Fisherman's Friends
- Brenda Wootton

==== Northumbria ====
- Jack Armstrong
- John Armstrong (of Carrick)
- Tommy Armstrong
- Will Atkinson
- Tom Clough
- Johnny Handle
- George Hepple
- Joe Hutton
- Jack the Lad
- James Hill
- Nancy Kerr
- Billy Pigg
- Jock Purdon
- Colin Ross
- Kathryn Tickell
- Robert Whinham
- The Witches of Elswick
- Jez Lowe

=== Isle of Man ===
- Christine Collister
- Ruth Keggin

=== Scotland ===
- Aidan O'Rourke
- Alistair Hulett
- Alasdair Roberts
- Aly Bain
- Amy MacDonald
- Archie Fisher
- Battlefield Band
- Bert Jansch
- Billy Connolly
- Capercaillie
- Catriona MacDonald
- Dick Gaughan
- Duncan Chisholm
- Donovan
- Eric Bogle
- Ewan MacColl
- Gordon Duncan
- Ian Campbell Folk Group
- Ivan Drever
- James Mackintosh
- John McCusker
- Johnny Cunningham
- Julie Fowlis
- Karine Polwart
- Kris Drever
- Lau
- Linda Thompson
- Martyn Bennett
- Matt McGinn
- Phil Cunningham
- Rachel Hair
- Shooglenifty
- Sìleas
- Silly Wizard
- Simon Thoumire
- Skipinnish
- The Corries
- The House Band
- The Incredible String Band
- The McCalmans
- The Tannahill Weavers
- Tom Anderson
- Wolfstone

=== Wales ===
- Fernhill
- Jack Harris
- Mary Hopkin
- Sian James
- Ceri Rhys Matthews
- Julie Murphy
- Siobhan Owen
- Siân Phillips
- Phil Tanner

== United States ==
=== Appalachian ===
- Clarence Ashley
- Joe Bethancourt
- Dock Boggs
- Fleming Brown
- Dick Burnett
- Guy Carawan
- Sara Carter
- Stoney Cooper
- Hazel Dickens
- Roscoe Holcomb
- Tommy Jarrell
- Kossoy Sisters
- Wilma Lee
- Bascom Lamar Lunsford
- New Lost City Ramblers
- Uncle Charlie Osborne
- Jean Ritchie
- Sam Rizzetta
- Loraine Wyman
- Doc Watson
- Uncle Dave Macon
- Charlie Poole
- Possessed by Paul James
- Rising Appalachia

=== Cajun and zydeco ===
- Fernest Arceneaux
- Amédé Ardoin
- Chris Ardoin
- Dewey Balfa
- BeauSoleil
- Bobby Charles
- Boozoo Chavis
- C. J. Chenier
- Clifton Chenier
- Geno Delafose
- John Delafose
- Keith Frank
- Queen Ida
- Beau Jocque
- Rosie Ledet
- D. L. Menard
- Jimmy C. Newman
- Steve Riley and the Mamou Playboys
- Rockin' Dopsie
- Rockin' Sidney
- Amanda Shaw
- Terrance Simien
- Jo-El Sonnier
- Nathan Williams
- Buckwheat Zydeco
- Zydeco Force

=== General ===
==== 0–9 ====
- 10,000 Maniacs

==== A–C ====
- The Accidentals
- Derroll Adams
- A Fragile Tomorrow
- The Almanac Singers
- Eric Andersen
- Jamie Anderson
- Joan Baez
- Devendra Banhart
- Barnaby
- Robin Batteau
- Dan Bern
- Leon Bibb
- Theodore Bikel
- Billy Pilgrim
- David Blue
- Hugh Blumenfeld
- Dock Boggs
- Gordon Bok
- Ralston Bowles
- Bryan Bowers
- Oscar Brand
- Brewer & Shipley
- Chuck Brodsky
- David Bromberg
- Jonatha Brooke
- The Brothers Four
- Greg Brown
- Jeff Buckley
- Tim Buckley
- David Buskin
- The Byrds
- Rolf Cahn
- Andrew Calhoun
- Hamilton Camp
- Guy Carawan
- Mary Chapin Carpenter
- Liz Carroll
- Dave Carter
- Chad Mitchell Trio
- Len Chandler
- Harry Chapin
- Tracy Chapman
- The Chenille Sisters
- Cherish the Ladies
- Vic Chesnutt
- Frank Christian
- Meg Christian
- The Civil Wars
- Paul Clayton
- Slaid Cleaves
- Shana Cleveland
- Judy Collins
- Lui Collins
- Shawn Colvin
- Annette Conlon
- Michael Cooney
- Matt Costa
- Elizabeth Cotten
- Counting Crows
- Jesse Welles
- Jim Croce
- Mike Cross
- Sis Cunningham
- Catie Curtis

==== D–F ====
- Barbara Dane
- Erik Darling
- The Decemberists
- Grey DeLisle
- Kris Delmhorst
- Iris DeMent
- John Denver
- Ani DiFranco
- Alice Di Micele
- disappear fear
- Alix Dobkin
- DW (Dave) Drouillard
- Antje Duvekot
- Richard Dyer-Bennet
- Bob Dylan
- Eddie from Ohio
- Seamus Egan
- Cass Elliot
- Ramblin' Jack Elliott
- Mark Erelli
- John Fahey
- Mimi Fariña
- Richard Fariña
- Anne Feeney
- Melissa Ferrick
- Cathy Fink
- Fleet Foxes
- Steve Forbert
- Mark Fosson
- Jeffrey Foucault
- Four Bitchin' Babes
- Bob Franke
- Donavon Frankenreiter
- Debbie Friedman

==== G–J ====
- Gaia Consort
- Garfunkel and Oates
- Mary Gauthier
- Bob Gibson
- Ronnie Gilbert
- Vance Gilbert
- Eliza Gilkyson
- Terry Gilkyson
- Steve Gillette
- Tif Ginn
- Girlyman
- Joe Glazer
- Steve Goodman
- John Gorka
- Mark Gormley
- Tracy Grammer
- Greenbriar Boys
- Patty Griffin
- Nanci Griffith
- Arlo Guthrie
- Nora Guthrie
- Sarah Lee Guthrie
- Woody Guthrie
- Kristen Hall
- Frank Hamilton
- Kristy Hanson
- Jack Hardy
- Kelly Harrell
- Jesse Harris
- Richie Havens
- Bess Lomax Hawes
- Lee Hays
- John Herald
- Priscilla Herdman
- Carolyn Hester
- Sara Hickman
- The Highwaymen
- Anne Hills
- David Holt
- Holy Modal Rounders
- Rita Hosking
- Cisco Houston
- Michael Hurley
- Janis Ian
- Indigo Girls
- Iron & Wine
- Bon Iver
- Eileen Ivers
- Burl Ives
- Ella Jenkins
- Jim and Jean
- Jewel Kilcher
- Mason Jennings
- Orville Johnson
- Daniel Johnston
- Freedy Johnston
- Billy Jonas
- Diana Jones
- Dick Justice

==== K–M ====
- Si Kahn
- Noah Kahan
- Shira Kammen
- Christine Kane
- Lucy Kaplansky
- Buell Kazee
- The Kennedys
- Barbara Kessler
- Jennifer Kimball
- Charlie King
- The Kingston Trio
- The Klezmatics
- Bonnie Koloc
- Leo Kottke
- Peter La Farge
- Jimmy LaFave
- Bruce Langhorne
- Patty Larkin
- Lavender Diamond
- Christine Lavin
- Lead Belly
- Katie Lee
- Julius Lester
- Jeffrey Lewis
- Lily and Maria
- The Limeliters
- Alan Lomax
- Laura Love
- Lullaby for the Working Class
- The Lumineers
- The Mammals
- Cindy Mangsen
- Woody Mann
- Roger Manning
- Marcy Marxer
- Molly Mason
- Willy Mason
- David Massengill
- Ed McCurdy
- John McCutcheon
- Country Joe McDonald
- Brownie McGhee
- Lori McKenna
- Will McLean
- Melanie
- Ingrid Michaelson
- The Microphones
- Bill Miller
- Roger Miller
- Anaïs Mitchell
- Mr. & Mrs. Something
- Modern Folk Quartet
- Alastair Moock
- Bill Morrissey
- Mount Eerie
- Jason Mraz
- Geoff Muldaur
- Maria Muldaur
- Peter Mulvey

==== N–R ====
- Holly Near
- Fred Neil
- Ayla Nereo
- Neutral Milk Hotel
- The New Christy Minstrels
- Carrie Newcomer
- Joanna Newsom
- Nickel Creek
- The Nields
- Willie Nile
- John Jacob Niles
- Conor Oberst
- Phil Ochs
- Mark O'Connor
- Odetta
- Jerry O'Sullivan
- Jim Page
- Patrick Park
- Tom Paxton
- Ellis Paul
- Alice Peacock
- Elvis Perkins
- Peter, Paul & Mary
- Gretchen Peters
- Phillip Phillips
- Utah Phillips
- Phranc
- Wally Pleasant
- Rose Polenzani
- John Prine
- Chris Pureka
- R.E.M.
- Joshua Radin
- Ratsy
- Toshi Reagon
- Rebecca Riots
- Red Molly
- Del Rey
- Malvina Reynolds
- Jean Ritchie
- Josh Ritter
- Earl Robinson
- The Roches
- Libby Roderick
- The Rooftop Singers
- Jack Rose
- Josh Rouse
- Tom Rush

==== S–T ====
- The Sandpipers
- Claudia Schmidt
- Eric Schwartz
- Mike Seeger
- Peggy Seeger
- Pete Seeger
- The Serendipity Singers
- Martin Sexton
- Linda Shear
- The Shells
- Richard Shindell
- Michelle Shocked
- Paul Siebel
- Judee Sill
- Simon & Garfunkel
- Patrick Sky
- Langhorne Slim
- Fred Small
- Chloe Smith
- Elliott Smith
- Michael Peter Smith
- Mindy Smith
- Stephan Smith
- Chris Smither
- Solas
- Faith Soloway
- Leah Song
- Rosalie Sorrels
- Mark Spoelstra
- Bill Staines
- James Lee Stanley
- Starling Arrow
- Jody Stecher
- Sufjan Stevens
- The Story
- Sweet Honey in the Rock
- Taylor Swift
- The Tarriers
- James Taylor
- Livingston Taylor
- Luke Temple
- Rosie Thomas
- Trapezoid
- Artie Traum
- Happy Traum
- Two Nice Girls

==== U–Z ====
- Uncle Bonsai
- Jay Ungar
- Dave Van Ronk
- Townes Van Zandt
- Suzanne Vega
- Voices on the Verge
- Eric Von Schmidt
- Loudon Wainwright III
- Tom Waits
- M. Ward
- Washington Squares
- Linda Waterfall
- Doc Watson
- Willie Watson
- The Weavers
- The Weepies
- Gillian Welch
- Susan Werner
- Hedy West
- Floyd Red Crow Westerman
- Cheryl Wheeler
- Erica Wheeler
- Whiskeytown
- Josh White
- William Elliott Whitmore
- David Wilcox
- Dar Williams
- Lucinda Williams
- Victoria Williams
- Cris Williamson
- Wishing Chair
- Denison Witmer
- Kate Wolf
- Hally Wood
- Martin Zellar

== Uzbekistan ==
- Turgun Alimatov

== See also ==
- Traditional singer
- Lists of musicians
