= Hepple (surname) =

Hepple is a surname. Notable people with the surname include:

- Alan Hepple (born 1963), Canadian ice hockey player
- Anne Hepple (1877–1959), British writer
- Bob Hepple (1934–2015), South African academic
- Cameron Hepple (born 1988), Bahamian footballer
- Edward Hepple (1914–2005), Australian actor and screenwriter
- George Hepple (1904–1997), English fiddler
- Harry Hepple (born 1983), English actor
- Norman Hepple (1908–1994), English portrait painter, engraver and sculptor
- Robert Hepple (1898–1970), English footballer
