= Jinki =

Jinki may refer to:

- Jinki (era) (神亀), a Japanese era, a Japanese era name (年号, nengō,?, lit. "year name") after Yōrō and before Tenpyō. This period spanned the years from February 724 through August 729. The reigning emperor was Shōmu-tennō (聖武天皇?)
- Jinki (item) (神器, literally "God vessel"), an item used in Shinto ceremonies to worship kami
- Jinki (robot), the form of mecha that exists in the 2005 anime series Jinki: Extend
- Jinki (weapon), an anti-Gear divine weapon set in the Guilty Gear video game series
- Jinkies, a catchphrase from Scooby-Doo
- Lee Jinki (born 1989), leader of the boy band Shinee
- Jinki, an Aboriginal Australian, AKA Kerrianne Cox a musician
