= Whinham =

Whinham is a surname. Notable people with the surname include:

- Dave Whinham (born 1957), American sports and entertainment executive, filmmaker, and football coach
- John Whinham (1803–1886), founder of North Adelaide Grammar School in South Australia
- Robert Whinham (1814–1893), English fiddler
