= Vangapandu =

Vangapandu (Telugu: వంగపండు) is a Telugu surname:

- Vangapandu Appalaswamy, Indian writer.
- Vangapandu Narayanappala Naidu, Member of Andhra Pradesh Legislative Assembly elected from Gajapathinagaram in 1978 and 1985.
- Vangapandu Prasada Rao, is an Indian poet, lyricist and actor.
