= Rita Hosking =

American singer-songwriter

- Born: Rita Corinne Hosking; Davis, California
- Genres: Americana, country, folk, bluegrass
- Occupations: Singer, songwriter, guitarist
- Years active: 2003–present
- Label: independent
- Website: www.ritahosking.com

Rita Corinne Hosking is an American composer and musician based in Davis, California. She plays Americana and bluegrass styles of music with both standards and original songs. Since the release of Are You Ready?, she has been performing around the country at concerts, festivals, and other venues.

"Hosking's music isn't like the polished, over-produced music found in pop culture. Hers is a minimalist sound that reflects a simpler time and place: a little country town, rather than a big city."

Leading up to her 2010 performance tour of Great Britain, she received increasing attention on the "East Side" of the pond. Reviewer Paul Kerr of Americana-UK remarked that she is ". . . a very talented artist with the ability to step up to that pantheon of great female country folk singers and writers." In the summer of 2010, Hosking played to packed venues in England, Wales, and Cornwall.

== Influences and inspirations ==
Hosking grew up in a rural area in Shasta County, California. Her father worked the night shift at a sawmill as part of the area's logging industry. Her great-grandfather, from Cornwall, southwest of England, was an underground coal miner in the region. Her grandmother's family had headed there in a covered wagon on the Oregon Trail, from Virginia.

Hosking says old-time music was strong in her mountain area, as well as country. She grew up hearing neighbors play their simple instruments by ear, as a group called the Mountaineers. And the school cook took several girls from the school, taught them songs and they performed as the Farmerettes; with the Farmerettes, Hosking played washboard and sang her first solo.

"I'm no expert on the Appalachians at all, but I figure there are similarities -- the economy and some traditions, logging and mining. So, as a songwriter, you focus on that. You take the human struggle to survive, particularly in a beautiful place they love, and you've pinned down a lot of artistic inspiration."

== Performances ==
By invitation, she has appeared at the White Crow Conservatory of Music in Saginaw, Michigan, the 17th Annual “Midsummer in the Northwoods” Bluegrass Festival in Wisconsin, high in the Colorado Rockies at the Telluride Bluegrass Festival, and many other locations.

On July 16, 2010, she performed at the Larmer Tree Festival in England, at the famed Victorian pleasure garden on the Wiltshire/Dorset border. On July 22, she was the featured guest on the BBC radio show Bob Harris Country. On November 3, 2010, she performed at The Freight and Salvage Coffeehouse in Berkeley, California.

Hosking has also performed at many popular festivals including the Strawberry Music Festival, Live Oak Music Festival, Kate Wolf Music Festival and Sisters Folk Festival.

== Recognition and awards ==
Rita was the 2007 Emerging Artist Winner at the Bluegrassin' In The Foothills festival in Plymouth, California.

On September 6, 2008, Rita was selected the winner of the nationally respected Dave Carter Memorial Songwriting Contest at the Sisters Folk Festival in Sisters, Oregon.

On June 18, 2009, Rita performed as a finalist at the acclaimed Telluride Troubadour Competition, held in conjunction with the Telluride Bluegrass Festival. The Competition judges songs based on composition, vocal delivery, and overall performance.

"Come Sunrise" was nominated in November 2009 as one of the five finalists for Album of the Year in the category of "country music" by the 9th annual Independent Music Awards. Hosking won the 9th annual Independent Music Awards Vox Pop / Peoples Choice / Best Country Album award for "Come Sunrise".

== Soloist and with groups ==
Rita is versatile, performing either as a soloist, or in duos, trios or quartets.

Rita is sometimes supported by a back-up group named Cousin Jack that includes:

- Sean Feder - banjo, dobro, bass, percussion, vocals
- Bill Dakin - bass, guitar, vocals
- Andy Lentz - fiddle
- Kora Feder - mandolin, banjo, guitar, vocals

== Songs written by Rita Hosking ==
The following singles were written by Rita Hosking and performed by others:

- Kati Penn – "I'm Going Home" on the album "My Turn to Cry" produced by Rob Ickes

== Come Sunrise ==
During the spring of 2008 at the Strawberry Music Festival Rita heard a performance of Mississippi native Caroline Herring. Hosking bought Herring's album and discovered that Rich Brotherton, longtime mandolin and guitar player in Robert Earl Keen's band, had produced it. "I loved it," says Hosking, "so I 'My Spaced' him and said, 'Hi, my name is Rita. Would you be interested in producing my next album?' He wrote right back and said, 'Sure.'" In addition to Brotherton, she was backed by such musicians as Lloyd Maines (father of Dixie Chicks lead singer Natalie Maines and a well-known musician and record producer), Warren Hood of the Waybacks, and Tom Van Schaik and Marty Muse from Keen's band.

This collaboration evolved into "Come Sunrise", which was released in June 2009 and is available through CD Baby, Digstation, and iTunes. It was recorded and produced at Ace Recording in Austin, Texas.

As described by Stuart Mason: "On her new release Come Sunrise, singer-songwriter Rita Hosking reflects her upbringing in rural Shasta County. Her breed of Nor Cal country folk ain’t quite old-timey, and it ain’t quite bluegrass, but damn it’s sweet. For fans of Emmylou and Gillian, this one’s a safe bet. The songs of Rita Hoskings are as fragile as a newborn baby, and defiant as a West Virginia coal miner."

As described by Neil Spencer of the Guardian (UK): "Hosking . . . hits impressive form on this album. Her songs are compassionate tales about ordinary folk from her north Californian background – loggers, miners, the mothers of lost sons – but there is anger as well as warmth in her voice. "Montgomery Creek Blues" and "Promise Land" in particular meld the personal and political to become state-of-the-nation songs."

In July 2009 "Come Sunrise" placed Number 12 on the national Freeform American Roots Chart.

"Come Sunrise" was selected as one of five contenders for the country music "album of the year" of the 9th annual Independent Music Awards, announced in November 2009 (see description under Recognition and Awards).

== Discography ==
- For Real (2018)
- Frankie and the No-Go Road (2015)
- Little Boat (2013)
- Burn (2011) self released.
- Come Sunrise (2009) self released.

". . . a mellow slice of Americana with deep Appalachian roots. Rita's a gifted songwriter with a strong clear voice straight from the mountains . . . . "

- Silver Stream (2007) self released.

"Loaded with verve, spirit and out of the box energy, you don’t have to be a hardcore bluegrass fan to play this often and loud. A top shelf recording all the way."

- Are You Ready? (2005) self released.

In addition she has provided vocals for other recordings such as the Loose Acoustic Trio's album Sorrow Be Gone.
