= Udi Hrant Kenkulian =

Turkish oud player (1901–1978)

Udi Hrant with his oud

Udi Hrant Kenkulian (Armenian: Հրանդ Քենքուլեան; (Note: In Western Armenian and classical orthography; Հրանտ Քենքուլյան in reformed Eastern Armenian.) Turkish: Hrant Kenkülyan; (Note: Also rendered as Hrant Kenkuloglu.) 1901 – August 29, 1978), often referred to as Udi Hrant (Note: Alternatively spelled Oudi Hrant, in Western Armenian: Ուտի Հրանդ.) (lit. "oud-player Hrant") or as Hrant Emre ("Hrant of the soul") was an oud player of Ottoman classical music, and a key transitional figure in its transformation into a contemporary style of popular music. He was an ethnic Armenian citizen of Turkey who spent most of his life in Turkey and wrote most of his lyrics in Turkish. He concurrently composed and performed in Armenian as well, although to a much lesser degree. Kenkulian recorded numerous sides in the United States and Europe during his travels in the mid-20th century.

As an oud player, he was a major innovator, introducing left-hand pizzicato, bidirectional picking (the tradition had been to use the pick only on the downstroke), double stops, and novel tunings (sometimes using open tunings or tuning the paired strings in octaves instead of to a single note). According to Harold G. Hagopian, he was most respected for his improvisational taksim.

== Biography ==
Born in Adapazarı, declared blind four days after his birth, Hrant as a child sang in the choir of an Armenian Apostolic Church. His family fled to Konya in 1915 to escape the Armenian genocide; there Hrant first studied the oud, with a teacher named Garabed. In 1918 the family returned west, first to Adapazarı and then to Istanbul, where Hrant continued his musical studies under some of the leading teachers of the time, including Kemani Agopos Ayvazyan, Dikran Katsakhian, and Udi Krikor Berberian (all of whom were Armenians). Somewhere along the way he also learned to speak French, and was actually accepted at age 16 to a Paris-based school for the blind, but he contracted typhoid fever and was unable to travel.

Several attempts (including by doctors in Vienna) failed to restore his eyesight, which prevented him from playing in ensembles. He made a modest living playing in cafes, giving music lessons, and selling instruments. There is some question about when he first recorded; he claimed to have made a record as early as age 19, but his earliest known recordings would appear to be from no earlier than 1927, since they used an electronic microphone.

In 1928, he fell in love with Ağavini, the sister of one of his students, but her parents would not let her marry a musician; they met again by accident in 1937 and married ten years later. In the meantime, he had written numerous songs about his desire for an absent love.

He slowly, but steadily, gained more fame as a musician. Some of his Turkish recordings were released internationally as early as the 1930s, first on RCA Victor, and later on such labels as Balkan (New York), Perfectaphone and Yildiz (probably, according to Hagopian, a single company, address unknown), and Istanbul (Los Angeles). Composer Şeirf Içli introduced him to Kanuni Ismail Şençalar, in whose group he played for a while, leading to opportunities to perform on Ankara Radio. In 1950, a wealthy Greek American brought him to America for another unsuccessful attempt at restoring his eyesight. The trip, however, led to a series of concerts in New York City, Boston, Detroit, Los Angeles, and Fresno, California, playing both Turkish classical music and his own compositions. This tour apparently increased his prestige at home: he began to perform frequently on Istanbul Radio, first as a soloist and later with a chorus he formed. It also recorded in U.S. recording sessions for Smyrnaphon and Oriental Moods. The former, according to Hagopian, are marred by his being "paired... with inferior musicians". The latter were a deluxe set, believed to be the first-ever inclusion of an oud with a violin and piano in a chamber music setting, issued in an elaborately packaged set with English language titles given to the songs. The recording included both Hrant's originals and classic songs by Kanuni Artaki, Bimen Şen, and others. During his trips to the U.S., he conducted master classes with young Armenian-American oud players such as Richard Hagopian, and Harry Minassian.

His recordings for Balkan, with Şükrü Tunar on clarinet, Ahmet Yatman on kanun and Ali Kocadinc on darbuka, and an unnamed violinist (probably Kemani Haydar Tatliyay), are notable for the fact that although they were recorded in Turkey, with a mix of Turkish and Armenian musicians, they include lyrics in Armenian; he also did other records with Turkish lyrics with the same line-up. Again apparently the same line up (credited as "Oudi Hrant and Friends") backed up singer Boghos Kirechjian (Hrant's brother-in-law, aka "Oudi Bogos") on several records. His original songs written in Armenian include "Parov Yegar Siroon Yar," "Siroon Aghchig Siroon Yar," "Anoosh Yaren Heratsa," "Ghurgeet [Khrjit]," "Srdis Vra Kar Me Ga," and "Hoknadz Durtmadz," all of which but the last have been recorded by his student Richard Hagopian.

He toured internationally again in 1963, playing in Paris, Beirut, Greece, the United States, and Yerevan, then the capital of the Armenian Soviet Socialist Republic. He recorded again in the U.S. during this time, but according to Hagopian the recordings are "inferior... [F]or small labels and record producers eager to capitalize on the 'belly-dance craze'." Canary Records of Boston, Massachusetts released a compilation of these tracks in 2016.

In 1969, Udi Hrant awarded the title of "Udi" and status as master of oud playing to five younger Armenian-American oud players whom he deemed worthy, some of whom had been his own students, (in alphabetical order): John Berberian, Chick Ganimian, Richard Hagopian, George Mgrdichian, and Harry Minassian.

His last performance was in Istanbul in April 1978, a benefit for the Sourp Purgich Armenian Hospital, at which time he already had the cancer that would kill him that August.

== Recordings ==
Releases and retrospective compilations that feature Kenkulian's recordings include:

- Eastern Standard Time: The Genius of Oudi Hrant, Near East (1963, LP)
  - Turkish Delights, Prestige (1964, LP, reissue)
- Houdi Hrant: Master of the Oriental Oud, Aris (1968, LP)
- Udi Hrant, Traditional Crossroads (1994, CD, compiles the 1950 New York recordings)
  - Udi Hrant, Kalan Müzik (1995, CD, reissue in Turkey), out of stock as of 2007
- Udi Hrant, Early Recordings, Vol. I, Traditional Crossroads (1995, CD)
- Udi Hrant, Early Recordings, Vol. II, Traditional Crossroads (1995, CD)
- Udi Hrant, Can All Times Be One?: Solo, Duo & Trio Performances From 1950s Independent U.S. Labels, Canary Records (2016, digital)
