= Louisiana Music (album) =

Studio album by Rockin' Dopsie
- Released: 1991
- Genre: Zydeco
- Label: Atlantic
- Producer: Ahmet Ertegun, Shane Keister

Rockin' Dopsie chronology
Zy-De-Co-In (1990)	Louisiana Music (1991)

Louisiana Music is an album by the zydeco musician Rockin' Dopsie (credited with his band, the Zydeco Twisters), released in 1991. His major label debut, it was also his final album.

== Production ==
Produced in part by Ahmet Ertegun, the album was recorded in two days. Two of Dopsie's sons, Alton Jr. and David, contributed to the album, on drums and rub board, respectively; saxophonist John Hart, formerly of Clifton Chenier's band, also played on Louisiana Music. "Since I Lost My Baby" is a cover version of Ivory Joe Hunter's "Since I Met You Baby", which had also been produced by Ertegun.

== Critical reception ==
Professional ratings
Review scores
Source	Rating
AllMusic	4.5/5 stars
Boston Herald	A−
Chicago Tribune	3.5/4 stars
The Encyclopedia of Popular Music	4/5 stars
The Indianapolis Star	3/4 stars
MusicHound Folk: The Essential Album Guide	3.5/5 stars
The Penguin Guide to Blues Recordings	2.5/4 stars
San Jose Mercury News	4/4 stars

The New York Times wrote that the album "sounds as slapdash as an impromptu hoedown; Rockin' Dopsie revamps zydeco favorites like Clifton Chenier's 'Hot Tamale Baby (Ain't That Right)', dances all over Little Richard's 'Keep A-Rockin'' and turns a sultry line like 'I'm in the Mood' into a go-go fiesta." The Chicago Tribune concluded that "this is one of the few zydeco bands to pass through a major label machine and come out with its sound and integrity intact." Newsday thought that "Dopsie is nothing more (or less) than an exceptionally solid zydecan, and the same goes for this record, a rare example of blessedly unadorned roots music on a major label."

The San Francisco Chronicle opined that "not since Clifton Chenier has the highly rhythmic, irresistible accordion-driven bayou beat made the heart skip in two-step time like this." The Boston Herald determined that Louisiana Music "hopscotches from rock to blues to two-steps in a potent, dance-floor-packing performance." The Times-Picayune wrote that the "band's loose-limbed style cuts through any pop pretenses ... And by the album's fourth song we're solidly into the classic, loose R&B with French lyrics that brought Dopsie his local following."

AllMusic called the album "a killer dance blend of rootsy zydeco full of grit, funk, and soul with pedal-to-the-metal rhythms." The Penguin Guide to Blues Recordings complained that the "studio sound crosses the line between pristine and sterile."

== Track listing ==
No.	Title	Length
1.	"I'm in the Mood"
2.	"Keep a Knockin'"
3.	"Since I Lost My Baby"
4.	"Josephine C'est Pas Ma Femme"
5.	"Lafayette Two Step"
6.	"Hot Tamale Baby (Ain't That Right)"
7.	"The Things I Used to Do"
8.	"Calinda"
9.	"That's All Right"
10.	"Zydeco Two Step"
