= Rockin' Dopsie =

American zydeco musician (1932–1993)

- The cover for Rockin' Dopsie's 1986 Crowned Prince of Zydeco (Maison de Soul)

Background information
- Born: Alton Jay Rubin; February 10, 1932; Carencro, Louisiana, U.S.
- Died: August 26, 1993 (aged 61) Opelousas, Louisiana, U.S.
- Genres: Zydeco
- Occupations: Musician; composer; singer
- Instruments: Accordion; vocals
- Years active: 1970–1992
- Labels: Sonet; Maison de Soul; Rounder; GNP Crescendo; Atlantic
- Formerly of: Rockin' Dopsie and the Twisters

Alton Jay Rubin (February 10, 1932 – August 26, 1993), who performed as Rockin' Dopsie (sometimes Rockin' Dupsee), was an American zydeco singer and accordion player who had success first in Europe and later in the United States. He played accordion on "That Was Your Mother" on Paul Simon's album Graceland (1986).

== Biography ==
He was born in Carencro, Louisiana, the son of Walter Rubin, who played accordion at local dances. Alton Rubin's first language was Louisiana Creole French. He was given his first accordion at the age of 14, and, being left-handed, learned to play it upside down. He began performing at local parties, and soon outstripped his father's abilities. He moved with his parents to Lafayette, Louisiana at the age of 19, and began playing in clubs in the mid-1950s with his cousin Chester Zeno on washboard. He took his stage name from a visiting dancer called Doopsie (and pronouncing his own name the same way). At the same time, he continued with his day job, eventually becoming an electrical contractor.

Dopsie played music for dancing, assimilating R&B influences into zydeco and sometimes covering R&B hits in a zydeco style. He performed around Louisiana, and recorded occasionally for small independent labels in the 1950s and 1960s. In 1976 he appeared at the New Orleans Jazz and Heritage Festival, and was signed by the Swedish record label Sonet, who issued his first album, Doin' The Zydeco, in 1976. Starting in 1979, he toured Europe regularly with his group, the Twisters, and his popularity there led to him recording a string of albums for Sonet in the late 1970s and early 1980s.

In the 1980s, he started to gain attention in the US. He played accordion on the zydeco-influenced song "That Was Your Mother" on Paul Simon's Graceland album in 1986. He recorded the album Crowned Prince Of Zydeco in 1987. His final album in 1991, Louisiana Music, received a Grammy Award nomination. Dopsie also recorded with Bob Dylan and Cyndi Lauper, and in 1992 appeared in the film Delta Heat. He died from a heart attack in 1993, aged 61, and was buried at Calvary Cemetery in Lafayette.

== Personal life ==
Dopsie was Catholic.

== Legacy ==
Since his death, his band, The Twisters, has continued to perform. Now led by his son Dopsie Jr. (accordionist, vocalist and washboard player), with sons Alton Jr. ("Tiger") on drums, and Anthony Rubin on accordion, the band is called Rockin' Dopsie Jr. & The Zydeco Twisters. Dopsie's younger son Dwayne also plays accordion and leads his own band, Dwayne Dopsie & the Zydeco Hellraisers.

Dopsie was related to professional tennis championship player Chanda Rubin.

== Quotation ==
My Little Girl (sample)
An audio sample of "My Little Girl" (from Zy De Blue, 1977)

"I'm the only man in the world that plays the accordion upside-down," Rockin' Dopsie said. "It's all because daddy didn't taught me how to play. I just picked it up."

== Discography ==
=== Studio and live albums ===
Album title	Record label	Stock number	Release year
Doin' the Zydeco	Sonet	SNTF 718	1976
Rockin' Dopsie & The Twisters	Rounder (licensed from Sonet)	6012	1977
Zy-De-Blue	Sonet	SNTF 761	1978
Hold On	Sonet	SNTF 800	1979
Hold On	GNP Crescendo	GNPS 2156	1983
Big Bad Zydeco	Sonet	SNTF 851	1980
French Style	Sonet	SNTF 872	1981
Rockin' Dupsee (The Legendary Jay Miller Sessions, vol. 30, recorded 1970–74)	Flyright (U.K.)	FLY-592	1983
Good Rockin'	Sonet	SNTF-905	1983
Good Rockin'	GNP Crescendo	GNPS-2167	1984
Crowned Prince of Zydeco	Sonet	SNTF 982	1986
Crowned Prince of Zydeco	Maison de Soul	MdS-1020	1986
Saturday Night Zydeco	Sonet	SNTCD 1003	1988
Saturday Night Zydeco	Maison de Soul	LP-1025 / MdS-CD-104	1988 (re-released on CD in 1989)
Zy-De-Co-In'	Sonet	SNTCD 1035	1989
Zy-De-Co-In'	Gazell Productions	GCCD 3003	1989
Clifton Chenier & Rockin' Dupsee	Flyright	FLYCD 17	1989
Clifton Chenier & Rockin' Dupsee	Paula Records	PCD-17	1991
Louisiana Music	Atlantic	82307-2	1991
Rockin' Dopsie and The Zydeco Twisters In New Orleans	Storyville	STCD 8052	2001

=== Singles and EPs ===
Song title(s)	Album title	Record label	Stock number	Release year	Note(s)
"Please Come Back Home" / "Don't Let The Green Grass Fool You"	<unknown>	Blues Unlimited Records	2001	1974	7-inch, 45 RPM
"Hold On (To That Tiger)" / "Baby Bye Bye"	Hold On	Blues Unlimited	2013	1979	7-inch, 45 RPM
"My Baby She's Gone" / "Ma Negresse" / "Lucille"	<unknown>	Sonet	SON 2191	1979	7-inch EP, 45 RPM
"My Baby She's Gone" / "Opelousas Waltz"	<unknown>	Blues Unlimited	2016	1980	7-inch, 45 RPM
"Oh Negresses" / "Sweetest Thing In The World"	<unknown>	Blues Unlimited	1000	<unknown>	7-inch, 45 RPM
"Woman I Don't Want Your Troubles" / "Things I Used To Do"	<unknown>	Blues Unlimited	2000	<unknown>	7-inch, 45 RPM
"I Need Your Love" / "A Lil' Bon Temps"	<unknown>	Bon Temps Records	45-6801	<unknown>	Side A vocals by Gene Morris; 7-inch, 45 RPM
"Pushin' & Pullin' " / "Who's Loving You Tonite"	<unknown>	Bon Temps	45-6802	<unknown>	7-inch, 45 RPM
"Hound Dog" / "Shopick Two Step"	<unknown>	Maison de Soul	MDS-1016	<unknown>	7-inch, 45 RPM

=== Various artist compilation albums ===
Album title	Record label	Stock number	Release year	Song title(s)
Zydeco Blues	Flyright (U.K.)	LP 539	1978	"Blues"
Louisiana Explosive Blues	Maison de Soul	LP-1006	1981	"Who's Loving You Tonite"
Zydeco Blues, vol. 2: The Legendary Jay Miller Sessions	Flyright (U.K.)	FLY 600	1984	"You Told Me"
Zydeco Blues, vol. 2: The Legendary Jay Miller Sessions	Flyright (U.K.)	FLY 600	1984	"Run Here To Me Baby"
Zydeco Blues, vol. 2: The Legendary Jay Miller Sessions	Flyright (U.K.)	FLY 600	1984	"Sweetest Thing In The World"
Louisiana Blues	Jin Records; Ace (U.K.)	CH 211	1987	"Who's Loving You Tonite"
Zydeco Festival	Maison de Soul	MdS LP 1024; MdS-CD-101	1988	"Old Time Zydeco"
Kings of Zydeco: Black Creole Music from the Deep South	Trikont (Germany)	CD-0158-2	1989	"Who's Loving You"
Kings of Zydeco: Black Creole Music from the Deep South	Trikont (Germany)	CD-0158-2	1989	"Pushin' & Pullin' "
Rockin' Accordion	Flyright	FLY 622	1989	"Everyday I Have The Blues"
101 Proof Zydeco	Maison de Soul	MDS 1030	1989	"Dopsie's Cajun Stomp"
Alligator Stomp	Rhino	R2 70946	1990	"Colinda"
Alligator Stomp	Rhino	R2 70946	1990	"Old Time Zydeco"
Sea of Love: Louisiana Bayou Hits, 1950's-1960's	P-Vine Records (Japan)	PCD-2137	1990	"Who's Lovin' You Tonight?"
Swamp Stomp!: a Cajun and Zydeco Sampler	Rounder	PR-1002	1990	<unknown>
Alligator Stomp: Cajun & Zydeco Classics, Vol. 2	Rhino	R2 70740	1991	"Mardi Gras in New Orleans"
Cajun & Zydeco Mardi Gras!	Maison de Soul	MdS CD-1044	1992	"Mardi Gras in New Orleans"
Zydeco Party	Ace (UK.); Swallow Records	CDCHD 430	1992	"Dopsie's Cajun Stomp"
Zydeco Party	Ace (UK.); Swallow Records	CDCHD 430	1992	"Shake Rattle and Roll"
C.T. Gator Presents A Zydeco Dance Party	GNP Crescendo	GNPD 2220	1993	"Zydeco Round The World"
C.T. Gator Presents A Zydeco Dance Party	GNP Crescendo	GNPD 2220	1993	"They All Ask For You"
C.T. Gator Presents A Zydeco Dance Party	GNP Crescendo	GNPD 2220	1993	"Ay-Te-Te-Fee"
C.T. Gator Presents A Zydeco Dance Party	GNP Crescendo	GNPD 2220	1993	"My Baby's She's Gone"
Kings of Cajun, Vol. II: 21 More Stomps From The Swamp	Music Club (U.K.)	MCCD 116	1993	"My Baby She's Gone"
Kings of Cajun, Vol. II: 21 More Stomps From The Swamp	Music Club (U.K.)	MCCD 116	1993	"Ma Negresse"
Kings of Cajun, Vol. II: 21 More Stomps From The Swamp	Music Club (U.K.)	MCCD 116	1993	"Josephine"
Best of Cajun Classics, Vol. II: Cajun & Zydeco's Greatest Artists	Mardi Gras Records	MG 1010	1994	"I'm In The Mood Baby"
Best of Cajun Classics, Vol. II: Cajun & Zydeco's Greatest Artists	Mardi Gras Records	MG 1010	1994	"Why You Do The Things You Do"
Absolutely The Best Of Cajun & Zydeco	Fuel 2000; Varèse Sarabande Records	FLD1041	1999	"Zydeco Around The World"
Absolutely The Best Of Cajun & Zydeco, vol. II	Fuel 2000; Varèse Sarabande	302 061 114 2	2000	"Run Here To Me Baby"
Zydeco Hot Tracks, vol. 2	Maison de Soul	VMS-7007	2002	"Old Time Zydeco"
Hypnotic Cajun & Obscure Zydeco 2	Moi J'Connais Records (Switzerland)	MJCR029	2015	"Doin' The Zydeco"

=== Guest appearance credits ===
Album title	Artist(s)	Record label	Stock number	Release year	Instrument
Ready	The Blues Band	Arista	BB2	1980	accordion
The Blowin' Man	John Hart	Sonet	SNTF 844	1981	accordion
Graceland	Paul Simon	Warner Bros.	9 25447–2	1986	accordion
A Night To Remember	Cyndi Lauper	Epic	EK 44318	1989	accordion
Oh Mercy	Bob Dylan	Columbia	CK 45281	1989	accordion

== See also ==
- List of folk musicians
- Long Beach Blues Festival
- San Francisco Blues Festival
