= Richard Hagopian =

Armenian-American musician

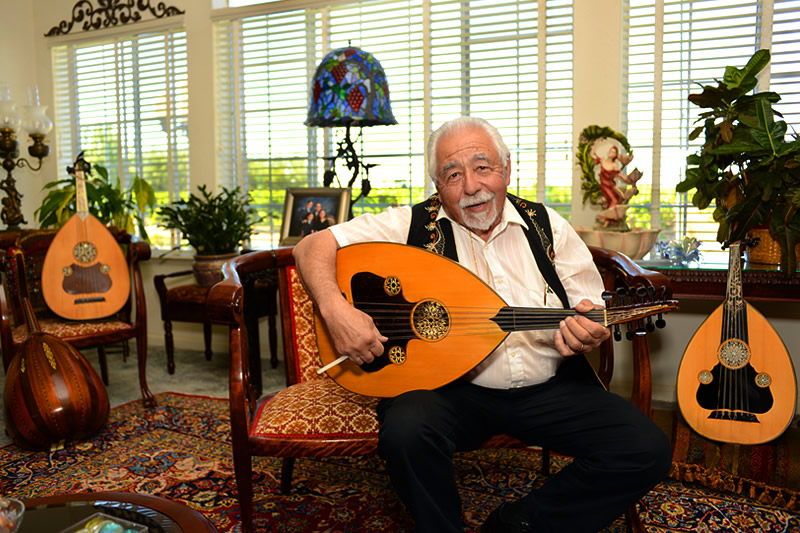
- Hagopian in 1989

Background information
- Born: Richard Avedis Hagopian; April 3, 1937 (age 89); Fowler, California, U.S.
- Genre: Armenian music
- Occupation: Musician
- Instrument: Oud
- Years active: 1963–present
- Labels: ARC, Smithsonian Folkways, Traditional Crossroads

Richard Avedis Hagopian (born April 3, 1937) is an Armenian-American oud player and a traditional Armenian musician. Hagopian achieved popularity in the 1960s and 70s as a member of the Kef Time Band, performing kef music, a dance-oriented style of Armenian folk music popular with diaspora communities.

== Early life ==
Richard Avedis Hagopian (Armenian: Ռիչարդ Ավետիս Հակոբյան) was born in Fowler, California to Armenian parents. He has been a musician since childhood, learning to play the violin and clarinet at nine years old. He started playing the oud at age of 11. At first he was self-taught, and then by invitation he studied Eastern (Ottoman Classical) music theory and oud under the Armenian kanun player Kanuni Garbis Bakirgian. Hagopian also took lessons by correspondence from legendary blind Armenian oudist Udi Hrant Kenkulian of Istanbul, who in 1969 gave him the title of "Udi" (oud master), being one of the few to receive this title.

== Career ==
Hagopian was a founding member of the Kef Time Band, which was formed in 1963 and gained fame in the next few decades. According to the liner notes of the 1968 LP Kef Time Las Vegas, the Kef Time Band was formed originally as the band for a Las Vegas show called the Cleopatra Revue, which ran at the Flamingo Hotel from 1963–1968. During this time the leader of the Cleopatra Revue band, Armenian-American dumbeg player Buddy Sarkissian, met Hagopian and immediately hired him after hearing him play the oud and sing. This was the beginning of the Kef Time Band's career; they would go on to become the most famous band playing the "kef" style of dance music popular among the Armenian-American community.

Hagopian has performed throughout the United States and taught a master class at the Manhattan School of Music, as well as teaching as artist-in-residence at California State University. For over 30 years, Hagopian has played annually at "Kef Time" events at dance gatherings ("kefs") in Cape Cod, Hartford, and Detroit. He is a recipient of a 1989 National Heritage Fellowship awarded by the National Endowment for the Arts, which is the United States government's highest honor in the folk and traditional arts.

His son is the violinist Harold Hagopian, also a music producer who runs the independent traditional music label Traditional Crossroads.

== Discography ==
=== Albums ===
==== LP ====
- Karoon Hayastan, Varoujan Assadourian with Richard Hagopian and His Orchestra
- An Evening at the Seventh Veil, Richard Hagopian and His Orchestra (1964)
- Kef Time Las Vegas (with the Kef Time Band)
- Kef Time Fresno (with the Kef Time Band)
- Kef Time Detroit (with the Kef Time Band)
- Kef Time Hartford (with the Kef Time Band)

==== CD ====
In the Kef Time series CD reissues a few of the track listings have been rearranged, while certain songs were either placed on different albums or left out altogether.

- Best of Armenian Folk Music (ARC, 1992)
- Armenian Music Through the Ages (Smithsonian Folkways, 1993)
- Gypsy Fire - Richard Hagopian and Omar Faruk Tekbilek (Traditional Crossroads, 1995)
- Kef Time (reissue of Kef Time Las Vegas and Kef Time Fresno, 1995)
- Kef Time Detroit (reissue, 2002)
- Kef Time Hartford (reissue, 2002)
