= Mike Absalom =

English musician, poet and entertainer

- Born: Michael Absalom; 9 November 1940 (age 85); Torquay, Devon, England
- Genres: Pop, folk, celtic music
- Occupations: Singer, guitarist, songwriter, harpist, poet, artist and children's entertainer
- Instruments: Guitar, vocals, clàrsach, fiddle, button accordion, harp
- Years active: 1960s–present
- Label: Various
- Website: Official website

Mike Absalom (born 9 November 1940) is an English pop, folk and celtic music musician, poet and children's entertainer. The Province newspaper once described Absalom's musical work as "innocence with a macabre twist". His recording and performing work in the 1970s concentrated on controversial subject matter including sex, drugs and the church.

== Early life and education ==
Michael Absalom was born in Torquay, Devon of Irish and Welsh parentage. After being raised in England and Canada, Absalom was educated at Oxford University and the University of Gothenburg, Sweden.

== Career ==
=== Early ===
Absalom worked as a busker for several years, before Patrick Campbell-Lyons (of Nirvana) signed him to Vertigo Records. By the time he signed on with Vertigo, he had already released two albums, the bawdy Mighty Absalom Sings Bathroom Ballads (1965) and Save the Last Gherkin for Me (1969), which featured guitar work by Diz Disley.

His skewed sense of humour and observation led to the issue of Mike Absalom in 1971 (produced by Campbell-Lyons), before Hector and Other Peccadillos (1972) garnered a larger audience. The former album featured a Roger Dean drawn record sleeve designed as a guide to Notting Hill Gate. The latter included session work by Ray Fenwick. His live work encompassed both the United Kingdom and Continental Europe. On 23 January 1973, Absalom appeared on BBC Television's The Old Grey Whistle Test, in a line-up that included Roberta Flack and Buck Ram. Absalom performed "Hector the Dope Sniffing Hound" and "The Saga of W.P.C. Sadie Stick, MacLagan and Bomber Dina". The show was hosted by "Whispering" Bob Harris.

=== Mid- to late-career ===
Finding minimal lasting commercial success, Absalom relocated to Maple Ridge, British Columbia, Canada in 1980, and continued to work as a solo performer as well as performing on CBC Television. In 1986, after expanding his largely folk music repertoire to incorporate celtic elements, he formed Mike Absalom & the Squid Jiggers, who became popular in Western Canada. Absalom's musical instrument expertise gradually included the clàrsach, fiddle and button accordion. Two years later he joined Harps International, a trio in which he played the Paraguayan harp, touring Canada, the United States and South America. A Canada Council scholarship enabled him to further study the Paraguayan harp in Asunción, Paraguay.

In 1996, Absalom performed at the Sixth World Harp Congress. Three years later he published both a book and album of his children's songs and poetry, Professor Absalom's Pomes For Gnomes, and performed at the Festival of Fools in Cambridge, England, on 1 April 2000. Latterly, he has made his own wooden puppets to perform his children's show; 'Professor Absalom and his Amazing Acrobatic Street Dolls'.

A multi-linguist, Absalom returned to Europe in 2002, and currently lives in County Mayo, Ireland, where he both paints and draws.

== Performance venues ==
Absalom has performed in the Royal Albert Hall, London, at the Grand Municipal Theatre in Punta Arenas, Chile, on BBC Television's The Old Grey Whistle Test (1973), and across Europe and North and South America.

== Discography ==
=== Albums ===
| Year | Title | Record label | Notes |
|---|---|---|---|
| 1965 | Mighty Absalom Sings Bathroom Ballads | Sportsdisc | |
| 1969 | Save the Last Gherkin for Me | Saydisc | |
| 1971 | Mike Absalom | Vertigo | |
| 1972 | Hector and Other Peccadillos | Philips | |
| 1977 | She Must Have Big Ones | Unknown | |
| 1978 | The Great Grombolian Connection | Unknown | |
| 1978 | Joking to Death | Unknown | |
| 1981 | Vintage Absalom | Unknown | |
| 1992 | Harps International Live in Concert | Unknown | With Lori Pappajohn and Jill Whitman |
| 1994 | The Paraguayan Harp of Mike Absalom | Unknown | |
| Unknown | Forest Dreams – Canadian Nature Scapes | Unknown | |
| 1999 | Kettle on the Fire | Unknown | |
| 1999 | Angels From Under My Feet | Unknown | |
| 1999 | Professor Absalom's Pomes for Gnomes | Unknown | |
| 2002 | Self Portraits. Live in Stafford and Brinklow 2002 | Unknown | Double live album |

== See also ==
- List of folk musicians
