= Harold Hagopian =

American violinist and record producer

Harold G. Hagopian is an American violinist, entrepreneur, record producer and founder of Traditional Crossroads world music record label in 1993.

== Biography ==
Hagopian is the son of Armenian-American oud virtuoso Richard Hagopian. His paternal grandparents fled the Armenian genocide and settled in California. He was raised on the family's grape farm in Fresno where he discovered his love for music at a very young age. He was playing the drum along with his father at the age of 4 and continued his interest in music until he found his passion in violin playing at just 5 years old. Hagopian graduated from The Juilliard School in 1988 with a B.M. in classical violin.

== Career ==
=== Musician ===
During his undergraduate studies, Hagopian performed with the Juilliard orchestra. He also went to Russia where he practiced violin with local musicians in a Haydn quartet. In 1994, he performed with the Tulare County Symphony in California. The late Alan Hovhaness had written a violin concerto specifically for Hagopian, which he was able to premiere during a performance.

Hagopian also plays the kanun and clarinet, and has served as the director of the Cornell Middle Eastern and Mediterranean Music Ensemble (CMEME) at Cornell University.

Hagopian has frequently accompanied his father, Richard Hagopian, in performances in the past. He has performed in a number of ensembles with prominent Balkan artists such as Yuri Yunakov, and performed with Fazil's Night Club orchestra which also included Omar Faruk Tekbilek. Hagopian is also a consultant to the Silk Road Project founded by Yo-Yo Ma.

=== Business ventures ===
Hagopian is responsible for bringing the Heifetz violin mute back to prominence. He co-founded a company which manufactures and sells the mutes, which had been discontinued in the 1960s.

He's also the owner of "Virtuoso Resources", a violin & cello rental shop on the Upper West Side.

=== Producer ===
After he completed his undergraduate study at Juilliard, Hagopian took a job at P.P.I. Recording in New York City in order to learn more about the recording industry. This job served as a launchpad for Harold to further his career. He often used the studio to make recordings during his personal time. Hagopian also made records with his father for the British Arc label and Smithsonian/Folkways.

Hagopian cites Jascha Heifetz as one of his major influences in his career and his reason for procuring a job at RCA. He was offered a position as a reissue producer at RCA Victor/BMG Classics in 1990 after demonstrating his vast knowledge of the Heifetz recordings, style and repertoire in an interview with RCA producer Jack Pfeiffer. He was ultimately responsible for remastering and re-releasing over 1,000 classical music records in about just 10 years of his career at RCA.

=== Traditional Crossroads ===
Hagopian used the same principles and techniques he had used in remastering and re-releasing classical music and applied them to world music. He founded Traditional Crossroads with Rounder Records in 1993 on this basis. Traditional Crossroads has been able to sponsor major US tours for dozens of international artists and the label has released over 150 albums. Hagopian continued working for RCA until 2002 despite the success of Traditional Crossroads.

== Recognition ==
Hagopian's works have been nominated for Grammys several times. His work on the Artur Rubinstein Collection later earned him a Grammy nomination for Best Historical Reissue. In addition, Hagopian received Grammy nominations for Fritz Kreisler: The Complete RCA Recordings.

The National Association of Record Distributors awarded Best String Recording of the Year to The Art of Taksim, the first recording by Traditional Crossroads. The Voice of Komitas Vardapet received a French archival restoration award and Night Silence Desert received the best world music album from the Association for Independent Music (AFIM) in 2001. He and his wife Cynthia Rogers have two sons, Felix Hagopian-Rogers and Simon Hagopian-Rogers.

== See also ==
- Lalezar Ensemble
