= Steve Gadd (Australian musician) =

- Born: 1957 (age 67–68)
- Origin: Franklin, Tasmania, Australia
- Genres: Folk
- Occupation(s): Musician, mentor, composer
- Instrument(s): Guitar, banjo, vocals, darbuka
- Years active: 2002–present
- Website: musictasmania.com.au

Steve Gadd (born 1957) is a Tasmanian folk musician, teacher and composer. He is also a collector, transcriber and advocate of local traditional music. At the 2012 Australian of the Year Awards Gadd was a state finalist as a Local Hero.

== Biography ==
Steve Gadd was born in 1957 in Tasmania. His interest in local folk music has led to a career as a musician and mentor. Gadd on guitar, with his wife, Marjorie Gadd, on violin, recorded traditional dance music from 1850 to 1950, which was released on CD as Real Island Roots in 2002. It was mixed and mastered at Huon Delta Studios, Franklin, by Geoff Francis and self-released by the Gadds. Czardas, a Romani music group, with Gadd on guitar, vocals and darbuka; Marjorie on violin; and Erin Collins on vocals; recorded an album, In a Vision, in 2003. It was also mixed and mastered by Francis.

Gadd and Marjorie are the co-compilers and publishers of Tasmanian Heritage Apple Shed Tune Book (January 2004), which contains 254 tunes. On the Fiddle (2010), was co-authored by Gadd, Marjorie and Peter MacFie. It details the life and music of colonial fiddler Alexander Laing (1792–1868). Gadd has contributed to several other collections of original and tradition Tasmanian music. He was also a Contributor to Veranda Music, a seminal book on traditional Australian musicians.

Gadd has written a play, Beneath These Mountains, based on the lives of traditional rural musicians. Gadd plays solo guitar; he duets with Marjorie on guitar, banjo and mandolin; he also performs with bands and ensembles: Buttongrass Serenade (traditional Tasmanian folk), Shake Sugaree, (Blues and Bluegrass), As The Crow Flies, (contemporary and tradition fiddle based group), The Tasmanian Heritage Fiddle Ensemble, and occasionally with Czardas, (Gypsy and gypsy-influenced music). He has toured Australia with Shake Sugaree and has performed at various festivals across the country.

Gadd has served as either a program director or festival director for The Franklin Apple Harvest Festival, The Cygnet Folk Festival, and The Taste of The Huon Festival. At the 2012 Australian of the Year Awards Gadd was a state finalist as a Local Hero for Tasmania.
