= The Freight & Salvage =

Musical venue in Berkeley, California

The Freight
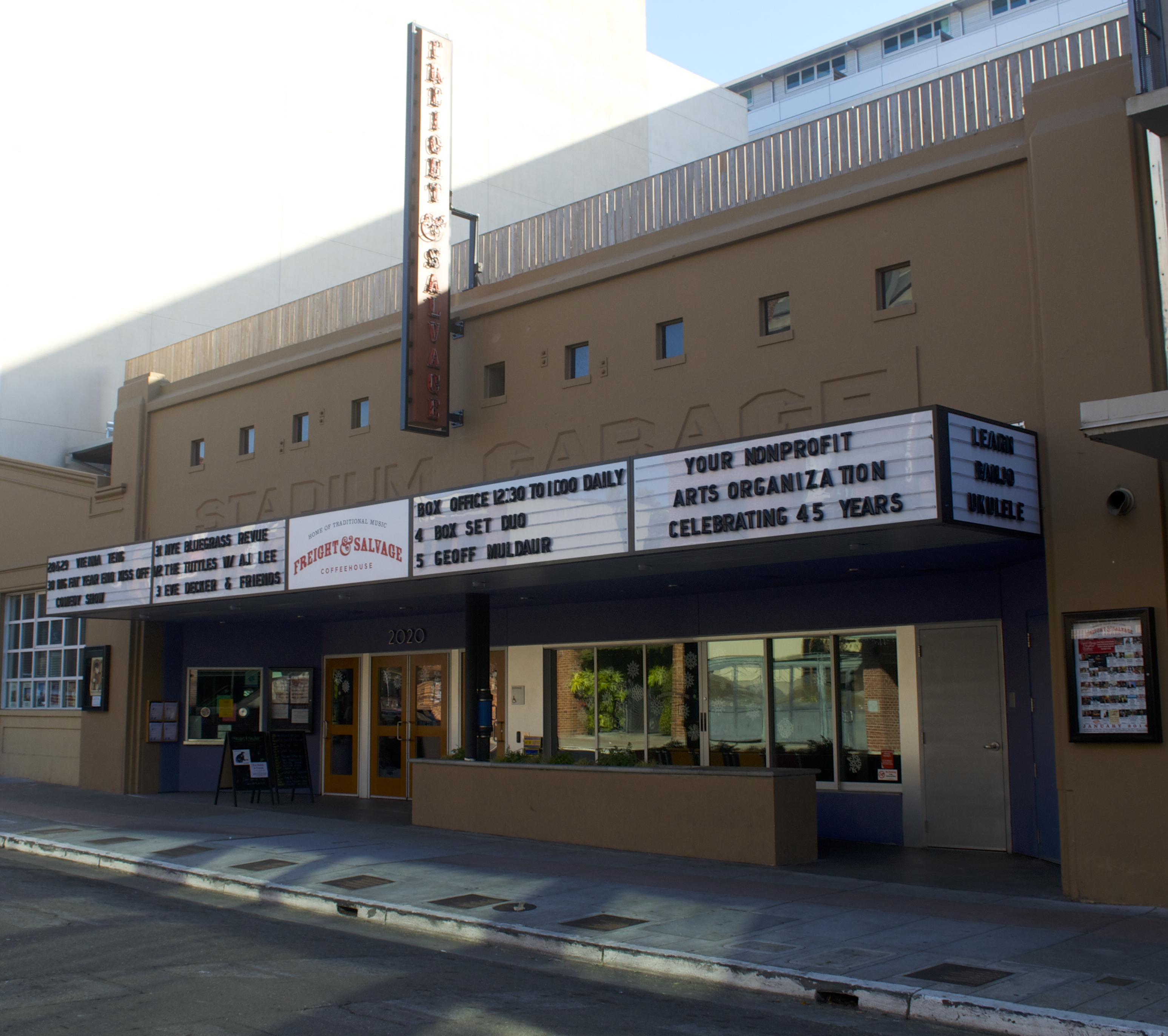
- Interactive map of The Freight
- Address: 2020 Addison St, Berkeley, CA 94704
- Location: Berkeley, California
- Coordinates: 37°52′15″N 122°16′11″W
- Type: Coffeehouse, non-profit

Construction
- Opened: 1968

Website
- http://www.thefreight.org

The Freight (previously "Freight & Salvage") is a nonprofit musical performance venue in Berkeley, California that primarily hosts Americana music and world music acts.

== History ==
The Freight was founded in 1968 by Nancy Owens and derived its name from the used furniture store that previously occupied the same space on San Pablo Avenue. In its early years, the Freight was a magnet for bluegrass fans and musicians but also presented an eclectic mix of folk, acoustic, Scottish and Irish, jugbands, mimes, spoken word and open mics.

In 1983, it formally incorporated as the Berkeley Society for the Preservation of Traditional Music. The club moved to a 220-seat space on Addison Street in 1988. On August 27, 2009, The Freight opened a 490-seat venue in Berkeley's Downtown Arts District. The $12 million project, built to LEED standards, has a green roof and features reclaimed wood from the original building on the site throughout, as well as classrooms to fulfill the organization's educational mission. The building was designed by Berkeley-based architects Marcy Wong and Donn Logan and the sound system was provided by Meyer Sound Laboratories.

== Musicians ==
Regular performers in its earlier years, such as Eric Thompson, Laurie Lewis, Peter Rowan, Jody Stecher, and Linda Tillery continue to perform there. Other notable performers from its first decade include Elizabeth Cotten, Lightnin' Hopkins, Malvina Reynolds, Alice Stuart, Hazel and Alice, Kate Wolf, Sue Draheim, and frequent shows by Vern and Ray.

Notable musicians who have performed at the Freight in more recent years include Dave Alvin, Greg Brown, Dan Bern, Theodore Bikel, David Bromberg, Johnny Clegg, Judy Collins, Ry Cooder, Tommy Emmanuel, David Grisman, Dan Hicks, Tom Paxton, Utah Phillips, Ricky Skaggs, Rosalie Sorrels, Marty Stuart, Richard Thompson, Cheryl Wheeler, Dar Williams, Cris Williamson and Odetta, among many others. Several artists have released live recordings of Freight performances, including Nickel Creek, Hot Buttered Rum, Graham Parker, John Wesley Harding, Kelly Joe Phelps, Fishtank Ensemble, Marley's Ghost, and the Berkeley-based band Rebecca Riots.

In 2016 Peter Williams was hired as Artistic Director, and under his vision The Freight branched out to include a more diverse blend of performers and featured John Santos, DakhaBrakha, Eddie Palmieri, Meshell Ndegeocello, Bill Frisell, Fatoumata Diawara, Kenny Garrett, Dom Flemons, Juan de Marcos González, Oumou Sangare, Bobby McFerrin, Kurt Elling, and a host of jazz, Latin, Americana, and world music performers.

The Freight also hosted a yearly free street festival called Freight Fest, with two stages of music outside the venue, and acts all day inside.

Its open mic is the longest-running open stage in the San Francisco Bay Area, and has featured Shawn Colvin, Dana Carvey, and Alvin Youngblood Hart.
