= Frigg (band) =

Finnish folk band

Background information
- Origin: Finland
- Genre: Folk
- Members: Alina Kivivuori - Fiddle, Esko Järvelä - Fiddle, Piano, Harmonium, Tero Hyväluoma - Fiddle, Petri Prauda - Mandolin, Cittern, Bagpipes, Juho Kivivuori - Double bass, Topi Korhonen - Guitar
- Past members: Tommi Asplund - Fiddle, Antti Järvelä - Double bass, Fiddle, Tuomas Logren - Guitar, Dobro, Gjermund Larsen - Fiddle, Einar-Olav Larsen - Fiddle, Anssi Salminen - Guitar
- Website: frigg.fi

Frigg is a Finnish folk music band that plays contemporary folk music, which takes its name from the goddess of Germanic mythology Frigg.

Frigg combines Nordic tradition and Americana in their music in a unique way that is described by the world music media as "nordgrass", referring to the band’s bluegrass influences. Originally a Finnish-Norwegian band, it is nowadays purely a Finnish band, but the Nordic features are still strong. Frigg is a band of six members, with instruments including three violins, guitar, cittern, mandolin and double bass.

Frigg has performed a lot around the world for over two decades. In addition to many European countries, the tours have taken Frigg to North America, Australia, Japan and Malaysia, as well as to the biggest folk music festivals such as Telluride Bluegrass Festival, Celtic Connections, Glatt und Verkehrt, WOMADelaide, Cambridge Folk Festival, Førde Festival and Rainforest World Music Festival. Frigg has gained wide audiences through television and radio when performing on A Prairie Home Companion live radio show in Minneapolis and on the El Mundo program on NHK World Japan.

Frigg has released twelve albums. Polka V (released in 2012) was chosen as the folk music album of the year in Finland and was nominated for a Finnish Teosto award. One of the most prominent world music magazines Songlines has picked the band’s two albums on their “Top of the world” list. Furthermore, fRoots, Sing Out! and Rhythms have mentioned the band many times in articles and positive reviews.

In November 2017, Frigg won Border Breaking Act of the Year Award at the first Finnish Ethnogala (awarded by Music Finland).

== Discography ==
=== Albums ===
- Frigg (2002)
- Keidas (Oasis/Oase) (2005)
- Live (2007)
- Economy Class (2008)
- Grannen (2010)
- Polka V (2012)
- Timeline (2014)
- Frost on Fiddles (2017)
- Joululaulut (2018)
- FRIXX (2020)
- Perintö-Heritage (2023)
- Dreamscapes (2025)
