= Maria Egorovna Rykina =

Kazakh author

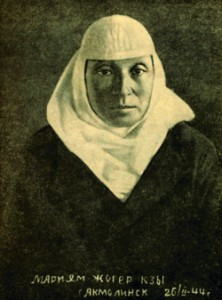
- Born: Мария Егоровна Рыкина; 1887; Korgalzhyn District, Akmola Region
- Died: 1950 (aged 62–63); Korgalzhyn District, Akmola Region
- Occupations: author and performer of folk songs
- Children: Рсалды, Муслима, Сайлаубек

Maria Egorovna Rykina (Russian: Мария Егоровна Рыкина), pen-named Mariyam Zhagorkyzy (Kazakh: Мариям Жагорқызы, Maria, daughter of Egor) (1887–1950), was an author and performer of Kazakh folk songs, and a People's Artist of the Kazakh SSR (1945).

== Biography ==
The daughter of Russian migrant Egor Rykin, Maria mastered the Kazakh language. She learned Kazakh folk songs well, and learned the national manner of their performance.

Her song "Dudarai" (Kazakh: Дударай) is a standby of modern Kazakh folk music, telling the story of a love that transcends national and religious boundaries. The name of the song comes from her pet name for the Kazakh man in question, Dudar, referring to his curly hair (Kazakh: дудар — Curly).

In 1920, the well-known collector of Kazakh musical folklore, musician-ethnographer Aleksandr Zatayevich recorded more than ten versions of the song "Dudarai".

Her story formed the basis of the opera Dudarai by Yevgeny Brusilovsky, first performed in 1953 at the Kazakh State Academic Opera and Ballet Theatre in Alma-Ata.

The Kazakh poet Halizhan Nurgozhaevich Bekhozhin dedicated the poem "Mariam Zhagorkyzy" (1950) in honor of the love story of Maria and Duisen.
