= Kalekuri Prasad =

Indian author and dalit revolutionary activist

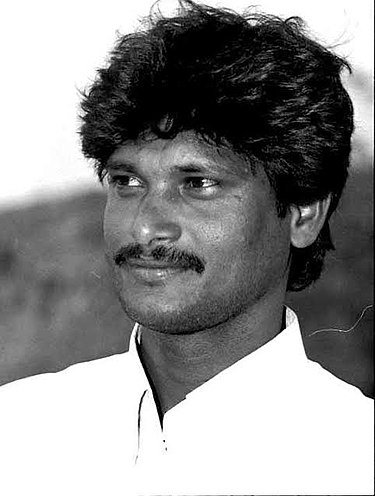
- Born: 25 October 1962; Kanchikacherla village, Krishna district, Andhra Pradesh
- Died: 17 May 2013 (aged 50)
- Occupations: poet, writer
- Parents: Srinivasa Rao (father); Lalita Sarojini (mother)

Kalekuri Prasad (25 October 1964 – 17 May 2013) was a Telugu poet, writer, literary critic, and dalit revolutionary activist.

== Life ==
Kalekuri Prasad was born on October 25, 1962 in Kanchikacherla village, Krishna district, Andhra Pradesh to Lalita Sarojini and Srinivasa Rao. His parents were teachers in a missionary school.

Kalekuri completed his primary and high school education in Eluru and Kanchikacherla. He then went to Guntur Andhra Christian College (AC College) in the early 1980s where he became involved in dalit activism.

== Dalit movement in Andhra Pradesh ==
Prasad worked in Jananatyamandali, Virsam, and former member of People's War Group. He actively participated in the Dalit movement at the time of the Chundur Massacre/Tsundur massacre (1991), Karamchedu massacre (17 July 1985), along with Bojja Tharakam, K.G. Satyamurthi, and others. He participated in the World Conference against Racism 2001, Racial Discrimination, Xenophobia and Related Tolerance (WCAR), which was organised by the United Nations in Durban from 31 August to 8 September. He contested from the Nandigama Assembly constituency in 1994 Elections from the Bahujan Samaj Party and secured 1,467 votes.

== Works ==
Prasad's songs have been used in films. He edited magazines. He translated 70 books from English to Telugu including the works The End of Imagination (1998) and The God of Small Things by Arundhati Roy. He wrote in Telugu "Andhra Pradesh lo Dalitulu". He used Yuvaka as pen name for his poems.

=== Books ===
- Dalit Literature (1962 – 2003)
- Dalita Kiranalu
- Dalit Movement – Dalit Literary Movement
- Dalita Hakkula Nigha
- Andhra Pradesh Dalits
- For a Fistful of Self Respect
- Untouchable Love (Antaraani Prema)

=== Translations ===
- Swami Dharma Theertha – The Menace of Hindu Imperialism (1998)
- Arundhati Roy – The End of Imagination (1998); The God of Small Things
- Kishore Shantabai Kale – Against All Odds
- Primo Levi – If This Is a Man (as Khaidi Number 174517)
- Mahasweta Devi – Choli ke Peeche, Paalatalli, Rudali
- Khalil Gibran – Selected poetry
- Vandana Shiva, Utsa Patnaik, Krishna Kumar, Palagummi Sainath, KS Chalam – Various essays
- John Holt – How Children Learn (co-translated with V. Srihari and Sunkara Ramachandra Rao)
- A.G. Noorani – Islam–Jihad
- Che Guevara – Revolutionary Politics (with Safdar Ahmed and Gudipudi Vijaya Rao)
- Basheer – Short stories

=== Songs ===
- Karma Bhumilo Pusina O Puvva
- Bhumiki Pachani Rangesinattu
- Chinni Chinni Asalanni

== Death ==
Kalekuri Prasad died on 17 May 2013 at Ongole, Ambedkar Bhavan.
