= Olga Voronets =

Russian folk music singer

Olga Voronets

Olga Borisovna Voronets (Russian: Ольга Борисовна Воронец; 12 February 1926 – 2 August 2014) was a leading Russian mezzo-soprano folk singer of the 1960s and 1970s. She was named a People's Artist of Russia in 1978.

Voronets was born in 1926 in Smolensk. She attended the VGIK and the Sokolniki opera school. Having made her debut at the age of 21, Voronets gained a wider audience after the International Folk Song Festival in 1956. In the 1960s, Voronets rivalled Lyudmila Zykina in popularity.

Her best known songs include "Zachem vy devushki krasivykh lyubite", "Sladka yagoda", "Glyazhu v ozera siniye", "Ya Zemlya". She toured many socialist states, the Russian Far East, Japan, South America, Denmark, and the Netherlands.

Since her husband's death in 2012, Voronets lived alone in Moscow. She had no children. She was named an honorary citizen of Smolensk in 2009. In 2010, she suffered a stroke.

Olga Voronets died on 2 August 2014, aged 88.
