= Lalezar Ensemble =

Turkish Ottoman musical ensemble

The Lalezar Ensemble is a musical ensemble which performs Ottoman classical music. It is based in Istanbul, and is "spearheading" the revival of Ottoman music.

Female vocalist Selma Sagbas stands in for the male castrati who were traditional from the 16th-19th centuries while the kanun, a Turkish board zither, is also featured.

== Releases ==
They released a four volume series on the Traditional Crossroads label:

- Music of the Sultans, Sufis & Seraglio, Vol. 1 - Sultan Composers

Consisting of songs and pieces composed by imperial sultans, including Murad IV, Selim III, and Mehmed VI, over five centuries.

- Music of the Sultans, Sufis & Seraglio, Vol. 2 - Music of the Dancing Boys

Consisting of songs sung originally sung by köçek dancers, cross-dressed young male entertainers.

- Music of the Sultans, Sufis & Seraglio, Vol. 3 - Minority Composers

Consisting of songs and pieces composed by Armenian, Greek, and Jewish composers, including relatively recent pieces.

- Music of the Sultans, Sufis & Seraglio, Vol. 4 - Ottoman Suite

Consisting of a suite, or fasil, constructed improvisatorily from different compositions all in the mode, or makam, Segâh, followed by a few examples of sarki.

In collaboration with Lalezar, Armenian-American musician Harold Hagopian spent three years to mix, annotate, and package the four volume series, causing the ensemble to increase their repertoire of pieces by Armenian composers.
