= Huldreslåt =

Scandinavian folk band

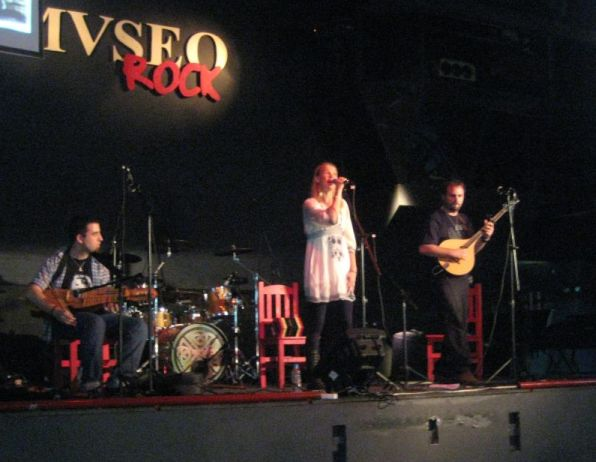
- Huldreslåt - October 2011

Background information
- Origin: Buenos Aires, Argentina
- Genres: Nordic folk
- Years active: 2006–2016
- Website: huldreslaat.com.ar

Huldreslåt is a Scandinavian folk band that was born not in Scandinavia but in Buenos Aires, Argentina in 2006. The musicians devote themselves to the study of the vast musical legacy of Northern Europe. Their work consists in taking melodies that hail from Scandinavia to perform them at their discretion, based on the musical formation of each member of the project. Furthermore, it is notable to mention that they do not leave the musical heritage of the Slav and Baltic countries aside, but include several tunes from these so rich in culture and history regions.

== Band members ==
- Martín Fuchinecco - Fiddle, Kantele, Accordion, Säckpipa, Nyckelharpa.
- Sergio Ribnikov Gunnarsson - Vocals, Irish Bouzouki, Härjedalspipa, Vevlira.
- Johanna Ribnikov Gunnarsson - Vocals, Mungiga, Kulning.
