= Joe Summers =

- Born: Joseph Summers; 1985 (age 40–41); Walsall, West Midlands, England
- Genres: Folk
- Occupations: Singer, songwriter, composer, musician, guitarist, barista
- Instruments: Vocals, guitar
- Label: istartedthefire
- Website: Joe Summers on Myspace

Joseph Summers (born 1985) is an English songwriter and musician. Originally from Walsall, he is now based in Cheltenham, where he has developed his sound, following in the footsteps of and sharing stages with some of his favourite artists, such as Steve Winwood on his recent European tour. Summers has also recently supported Britpop group The Lightning Seeds; Frank Turner and Fyfe Dangerfield.

Joe Summers attracts audiences wanting to experience the wistful commentary on his life and loves. He makes much of his new music available on his Myspace site. His limited edition Wincraft Sessions EP was released and sold out in summer 2011, though the recording of his popular "Turn the Boat Around" song was subsequently made available for digital download.

Gaining attention as a singer-songwriter "straight out of the Bob Dylan / Joni Mitchell mould" he was named as one of the top ten bands of 2010 and is regularly played on BBC Radio 2's Steve Lamacq show.

Summer's 2011 festival appearances included Wychwood; Worcester; and 2000 trees amongst others.

Summers is currently with istartedthefire records.
