= Lyudmila Zykina =

Russian folk singer (1929–2009)

- Людмила Зыкина
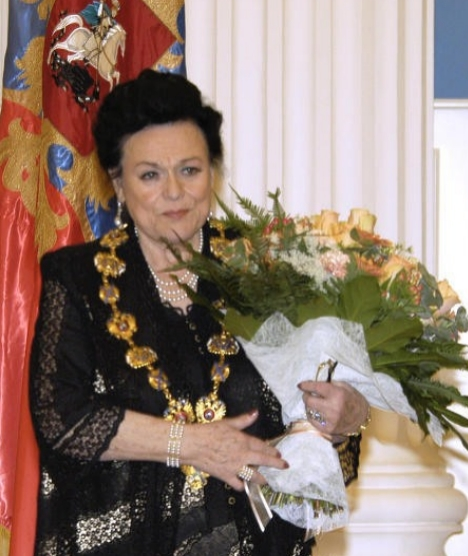
- Zykina in 2004
- Born: Lyudmila Georgievna Zykina; 10 June 1929; Moscow, Russian SFSR, Soviet Union
- Died: 1 July 2009 (aged 80); Moscow, Russia
- Resting place: Novodevichy Cemetery, Moscow
- Occupation: Singer
- Years active: 1947–2009
- Known for: Performance of Russian folk songs and Soviet estrada
- Title: Hero of Socialist Labour (1987); People's Artist of the USSR (1973)
- Awards: Order of St. Andrew (Russia); Order "For Merit to the Fatherland" (Russia; 1st, 2nd, 3rd class); Order of Lenin (USSR ×2); Order of the Badge of Honour (USSR); Lenin Prize (1970)

Signature
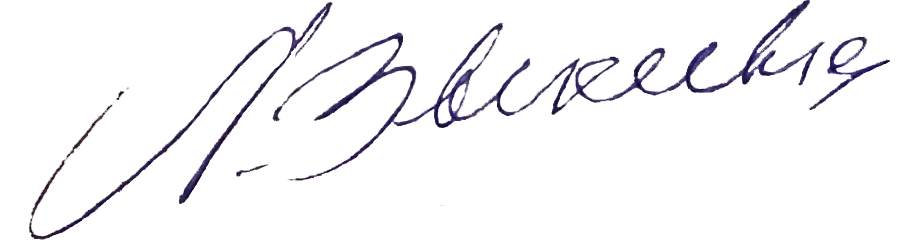

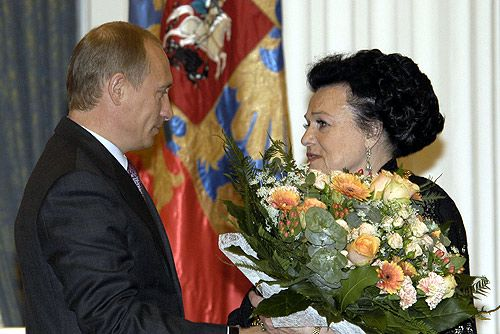
President Vladimir Putin awards the Order of St. Andrew to Zykina, 15 June 2004

Lyudmila Georgievna Zykina (Russian: Людми́ла Гео́ргиевна Зы́кина; 10 June 1929 – 1 July 2009) was a national folk singer of Russia.

She was born in Moscow and joined the Pyatnitsky Choir in 1947. Her surname is derived from the Russian word for "loud" ("зычный"). Beginning in 1960 she performed solo. She befriended Ekaterina Furtseva, the powerful Minister of Culture of the Soviet Union, and was reputed to be a favourite singer of Leonid Brezhnev. It is known she was a particular favourite of both Kim Il-sung and his son Kim Jong-il, performing in Pyongyang six times at the invitation of the Kims. It was also reported that Kim Jong-il was so fond of Zykina that he invited her to Pyongyang in 2008 in hopes that her performance would help him recover from illness. Olga Voronets was considered Zykina's main rival.

Among Zykina's many honors were the Lenin Prize (1970) and Order of Lenin (1979) as well as the titles of People's Artist of the USSR (1973) and Hero of Socialist Labour (1987). According to Dmitri Shostakovich, Zykina was "more than a brilliant interpreter, she was a coauthor, co-creator of composers".

Her signature songs include Techot Volga and Orenburgskii platok. The asteroid 4879 Zykina is named after her.

== Illness and death ==
The singer suffered from severe diabetes for many years. In 2007, she underwent major hip replacement surgery. As a result of complications from diabetes, Zykina developed acute cardiorenal failure. On June 25, 2009, she was admitted to intensive care in serious condition; a few days before her death she suffered a heart attack, and on July 1, 2009, she died at the age of 80.

The farewell ceremony for Lyudmila Zykina was held on July 3 at the P. I. Tchaikovsky Concert Hall in Moscow. The funeral service took place on July 4 at the Cathedral of Christ the Savior. With military honors, the singer was buried that same day at Novodevichy Cemetery in Moscow.

== Honours and awards ==
- Hero of Socialist Labour, with the Order of Lenin and the "Hammer and Sickle" medal (4 September 4, 1987) – for great contribution to the development of Soviet musical art.
- Order of St. Andrew (12 June 2004) – for outstanding contribution to the development of national culture and music.
- Order of Merit for the Fatherland:
  - 1st class (10 June 2009) – for outstanding contribution to the development of national musical culture and long-term creative and social activities.
  - 2nd class (10 June 1999) – for outstanding achievements in the field of culture and great contributions to the development of a national songwriting.
  - 3rd class (25 March 1997) – for services to the state and the great personal contribution to the development of national musical art.
- Order of Lenin (8 June 1979)
- Order of the Badge of Honour (1967)
- Jubilee Medal "50 Years of Victory in the Great Patriotic War 1941–1945" (1995)
- Medal "In Commemoration of the 850th Anniversary of Moscow" (1997)
- Jubilee Medal "In Commemoration of the 100th Anniversary since the Birth of Vladimir Il'ich Lenin" (1970)
- Medal "Veteran of Labour"
- People's Artist of the USSR (1973)
- People's Artist of the RSFSR (1968)
- Honoured Artist of the RSFSR (1965)
- People's Artist of the Uzbek SSR (1980)
- Lenin Prize (1970)

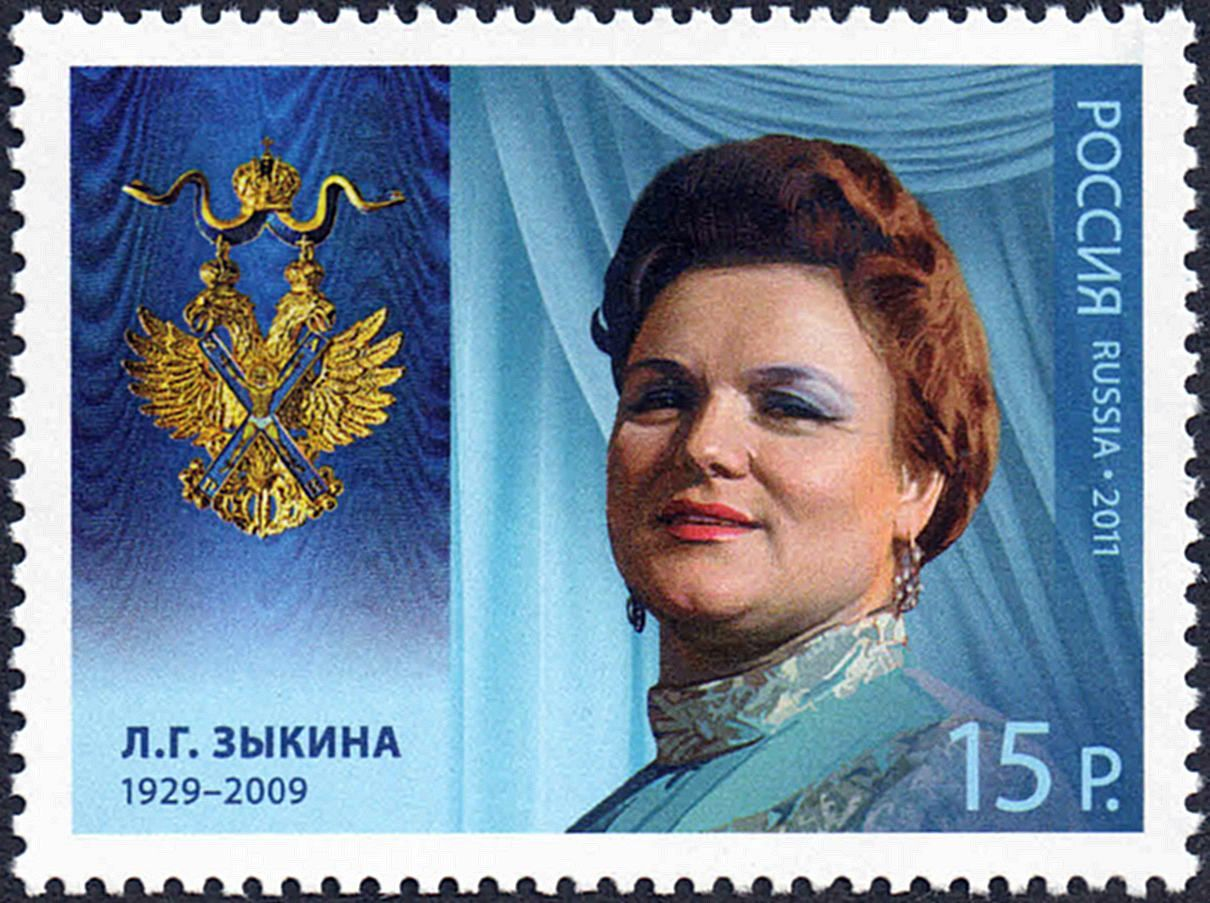
In 2011 Russia issued a stamp in her honour.
