= Sian Phillips (musician) =

Welsh fiddle player

Siân Phillips is a Welsh fiddle player specialising in Welsh folk and fiddle music.

Born in South Wales and raised primarily in Aberaeron, Ceredigion, she gained her knowledge of Welsh folk music from playing with several folk dance groups. She has been a member of the following folk and Celtic bands: Bysedd Main, Constitution Hillbillies, Cromlech, Ysbryd, Wild Welsh Women, Celtish, and the Rowdies and guested with many more. She organized an annual music festival, the Fiddle Festival of Wales. Siân currently has her own business ‘Fiddler’s Elbow Grease‘ making balms from hemp, in North Oxfordshire and retired as a performing musician in 2017 due to fibromyalgia.

== Publications ==
Phillips has arranged and edited a book of Welsh Fiddle Tunes, published by Schott Music Publishers under their Schott World Music Series, which was released in April 2013.

== Discography ==
Albums include:

- Gramundus, Fflach Tradd CD218
- Jac to Bach, Speedy Kat; SPDKCD01
- "Centrifusion" (band: Celtish)
