= Tess (musician) =

British singer-songwriter

Tess Jones is a British singer-songwriter.

His album Magpie was released on 25 October 2010 and was mastered by Simon Heyworth (Nick Drake, Brian Eno) and produced by Howard Gott. The album is distributed by Cadiz Music via Universal Music. It is available worldwide for download or in the UK on CD. Tess Jones is currently singer, guitarist and frontman of band Tess Of The Circle.

The album has been reviewed in MOJO, The Independent (IndyChoice: best new music), and Acoustic Magazine amongst others. His songs and live performances have been featured on several BBC Radio programs. In 2010, TESS was runner-up (2nd place) in The People's Music Awards Best Male Solo Artist category.

== Albums ==
=== Magpie ===
Track listing

1. Big Room
2. The Warren
3. Elliott
4. Magpie
5. Save me from myself
6. Lullaby for Maisy Jane
7. River
8. Springtime
9. Blame the Capulet
10. Living in a state of
11. The Reprise

== Singles ==
- "Big Room" – released 3 January 2011
