= Rebecca Riots (band) =

Female acoustic folk music trio

- Origin: Berkeley, California, US
- Genres: Folk
- Years active: 1993–2009
- Label: Appleseed Recordings
- Members: Eve Decker; Andrea Prichett; Lisa Zeiler
- Website: www.rebeccariots.com

Rebecca Riots (formerly known as Final Girl) was a female acoustic folk music trio from 1993 to 2009 originating in Berkeley, California, founded in 1993 by its members, Andrea Prichett, Lisa Zeiler, and Eve Decker. The band's music employs three-part harmony, guitar, mandolin and harmonica.

== History ==
The Berkeley, California, band Rebecca Riots was an acoustic folk trio named after the mid-19th century Rebecca Riots (Welsh: Terfysgoedd Beca), a series of uprisings against injustices and autocratic rule on the part of the anglicized gentry in South West Wales, notably carried out by men dressed as women. The musical trio was founded in 1993 by Prichett and Decker. They asked Prichett's guitar teacher Zeller to join. From 1993 to 2001 they released four CDs and were signed to Appleseed Recordings.

They toured the United States several times and played the Vancouver Folk Music Festival, Bumbershoot, and the Salinas Folk Festival, and regularly sold out multiple shows in Seattle, Portland, and The Freight and Salvage in their home town. They shared stages with Peter Yarrow, Utah Phillips, Laura Love, Street Sounds, Rhiannon, Ulali, Cheryl Wheeler, Sonia of Disappear Fear, Gwen Avery, Alix Dobkin, Alice Stewart, and others.

From 2002 to 2006 Rebecca Riots did not tour but played one or two shows a year in Berkeley. During that time Zeller gave birth to a child and produced albums for other singer-songwriters, Prichett became a public school teacher and visited Palestine, while Decker participated in long meditation retreats.

From 2006 to 2009 the band toured again and released its fifth CD, Just As Sure.

== Activism ==
Songs and between-song banter deal with a range of issues, including gay–straight alliance; combating homophobia; police accountability; healing through interfaith spiritual practice (the three musicians are Christian, Jewish, and Buddhist); caring for the homeless; prisoners' rights; positive body image for women; building with straw bale; gratitude toward nature; facing death and loss; anti-apartheid work; Palestinian rights; love and support of children and teens; and celebratory love songs.

Rebecca Riots has done concerts and benefits at folk venues and colleges in the United States, supporting causes including environmental movements such as Earth First!, anti-racist work, and organizations supporting marginalized people such as homeless people, children, and women suffering from domestic violence.

== Discography ==
- Rebecca Riots (1995)
- Some Folks (1998)
- Live at The Freight and Salvage (1999)
- Gardener (2000)
- Just as Sure (2004)
