= Vangapandu Usha =

Indian politician

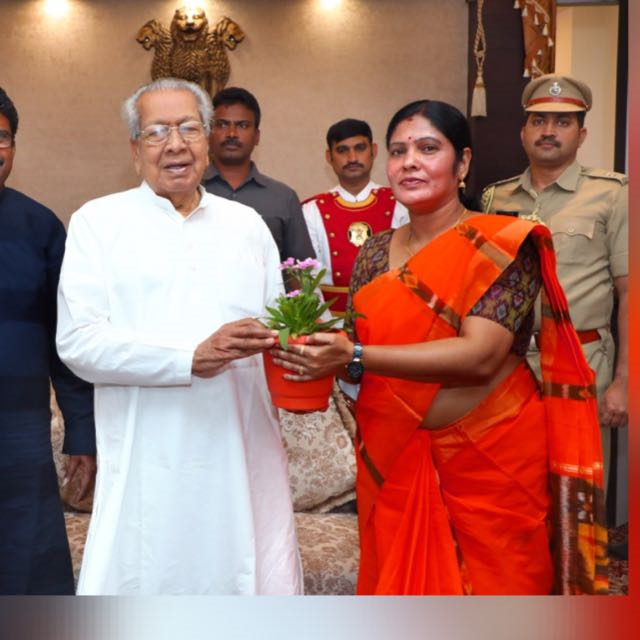
Smt. Vangapandu Usha with Honorable Governor of Andhra Pradesh

Vangapandu Usha is a Telugu-language balladeer. She is cultural wing convenor of YSR Congress party. She is popular for her folk songs and dance. AP State Government recently appointed her as a Chairperson for AP State Creativity and Culture Commission.

== Life ==
She was born to popular balladeer, poet and activist Vangapandu Prasada Rao.

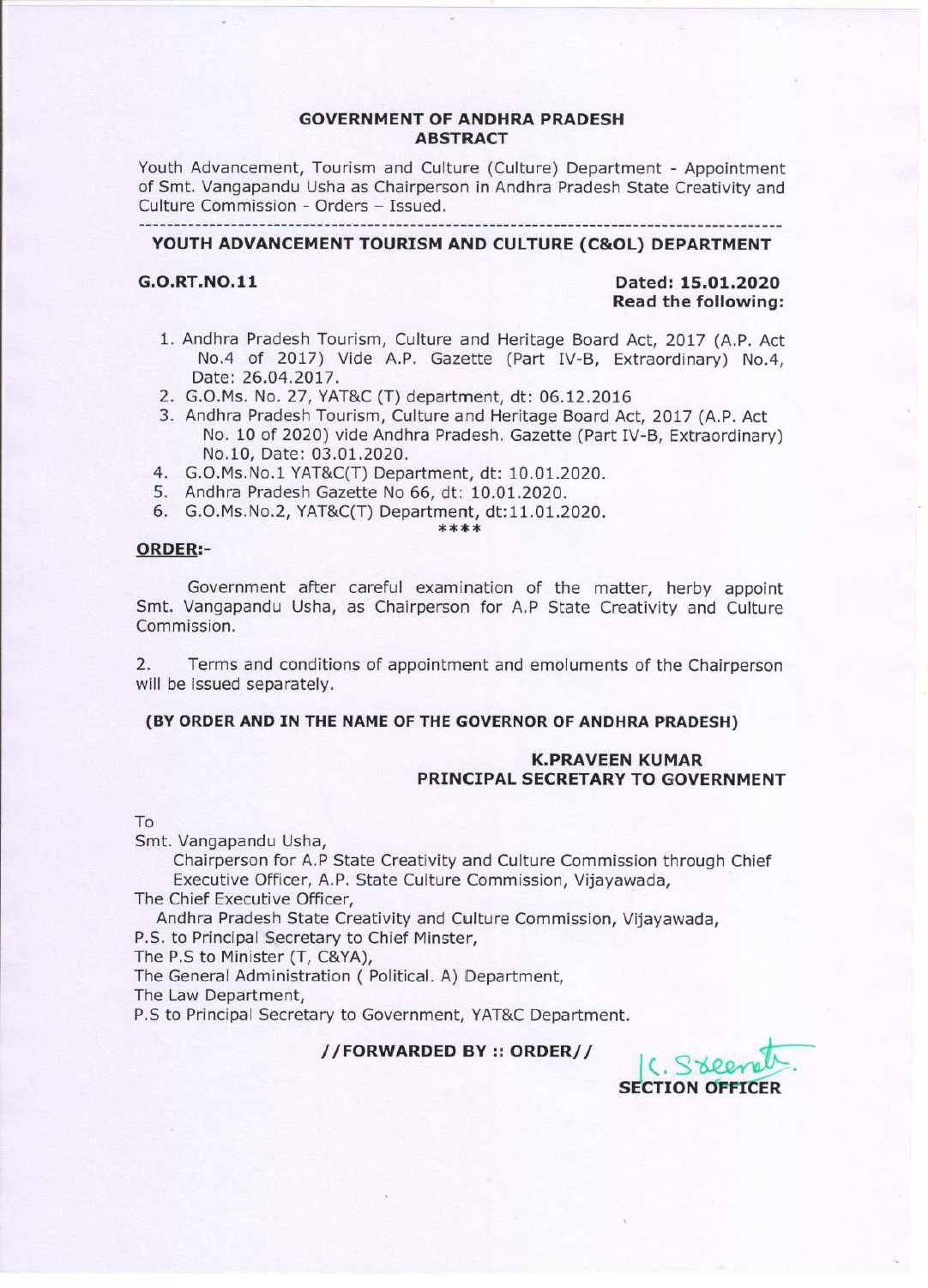
Vangapandu Usha Appointment

She was active among left-wing organizations but has joined YSR Congress party in 2011.
