= Kachra Khan =

Kanchra Khan
- Origin: Rajasthan, British India
- Genres: Folk
- Occupation: Folk singing

Kanchra Khan is an Indian folk singer from the Manganiar community.

== Early life ==
Kachra Khan was born in Khanayani Village, in the Barmer district of western Rajasthan.

== Career ==
Khan performs at major sufi festivals across the world.
