= Lily and Maria =

Background information
- Origin: New York City, United States
- Genres: Psychedelic folk; folk rock
- Years active: 1967–1969
- Label: Columbia
- Past members: Lily Isaacs; Maria Newman

Lily and Maria were an American psychedelic folk duo formed in New York City, in 1967. They are best known for their 1968 self-titled album.

== History ==
According to liner notes in the 2008 reissue of Lily and Maria, Lily Isaacs (vocals, guitar) originated from Poland, immigrating to the United States after surviving the Holocaust. As a teenager, Isaacs studied art, acting, and music in New York City, before working in Off-Broadway musical and acting productions. In early-1967, during one of her acting courses, she encountered fellow student and singer-songwriter Maria Newman, who was involved in the burgeoning folk music scene. Newman helped Isaacs learn how to develop her guitar skills. The two formed the folk duo Lily and Maria, performing as the house act at Gertie's Folk Club, located in Greenwich Village.

In 1968, Lily and Maria were approached by a talent agent associated with Columbia Records. After auditioning, the duo entered the recording studios along with session musician Paul Griffin, who contributed to Bob Dylan's Highway 61 Revisited and Blonde on Blonde. Music historian Richie Unterberger described the album as having a themes that were "are very much in the vibe of 1968 psychedelia". Unterberger hypothesizes Columbia did not offer a substantial budget, noting the compositions' sparse arrangements. Nonetheless, he praises the duo's low-key orchestration and electric instrumentals which contribute to an "appealing, hushed, never never-land ambiance".

At Gertie's Folk Club, Isaacs met Joe Isaacs of the Greenbriar Boys, a bluegrass group. After the disbanding of Lily and Maria, Lily Isaac later married Joe Issacs in 1970, converted to Christianity, and formed the Christian band, the Isaacs. In 2003, Lily and Maria was reissued by Columbia. Another release on Sunbeam Records in 2008 featured the two bonus tracks "Everybody Knows" and "Morning Glory Morning", which were first released as a promo single. Music critic Adam Milenski, in response to the album's re-release, commented on the difficulty of achieving unison in a singing duo, before recognizing how Lily and Maria's "voices blend ideally, hitting all of the right spots, each filling in the gaps left by the other, each seeming to understand what the other is aiming for". In addition to the album, "Everybody Knows" appears on the compilation album Hippie Goddesses, and "Morning Glory Morning" is featured on Shifting Sands and Women Blue.
