= Robert Hepple =

English footballer

Personal information
- Date of birth: 18 January 1898
- Place of birth: Mickley, Northumberland, England
- Date of death: 1970 (aged 72)
- Place of death: Northumberland, England
- Position: Winger

Senior career*
Years	Team	Apps	(Gls)
1920–1921	Bradford City	3	(0)
- Reading
- * Club domestic league appearances and goals

Robert Hepple (18 January 1898 – 1970) was an English professional footballer who played as a winger.

== Career ==
Born in Mickley, Northumberland, Hepple signed for Bradford City in May 1920 after playing minor football, leaving the club in June 1921 to sign for Reading. During his time with Bradford City he made three appearances in the Football League.

== Sources ==
- Frost, Terry (1988). Bradford City A Complete Record 1903-1988. Breedon Books Sport. ISBN 0-907969-38-0.
