= Sisters Folk Festival =

Annual music festival in Sisters, Oregon

The Sisters Folk Festival is an annual three-day roots music festival held in Sisters, Oregon, United States the weekend after Labor Day.

== History ==
The festival was established in 1995 by Jim Cornelius and Dick Sandvik and is hosted in Sisters at ten venues throughout the city, including a 900-seat venue at the Village Green Park in downtown Sisters, and 900 seats at Sisters Art Works.

== Programs ==
The Americana Song Academy is a creative camp with many Sisters Folk Festival Artists arriving early to teach all aspects of music, songwriting, performance and singing.

The Americana Project is a music and arts education program with broad community outreach. It is a collaboration between Sisters Folk Festival, Creative Educational Resources, and the Sisters School District.

My Own Two Hands (MOTH) is a regional celebration of the arts. Each year a theme is selected to inspire artists to create and donate a piece of art to be sold at the benefit auction in support of youth programming.

The Song Academy for Youth brings high school students together in a non-competitive format to cultivate musicianship, songwriting and creativity.

The Winter Concert Series shows are presented from January through March in the Sisters High School auditorium.
