= Vangapandu Prasada Rao =

Indian writer and actor (1943–2020)

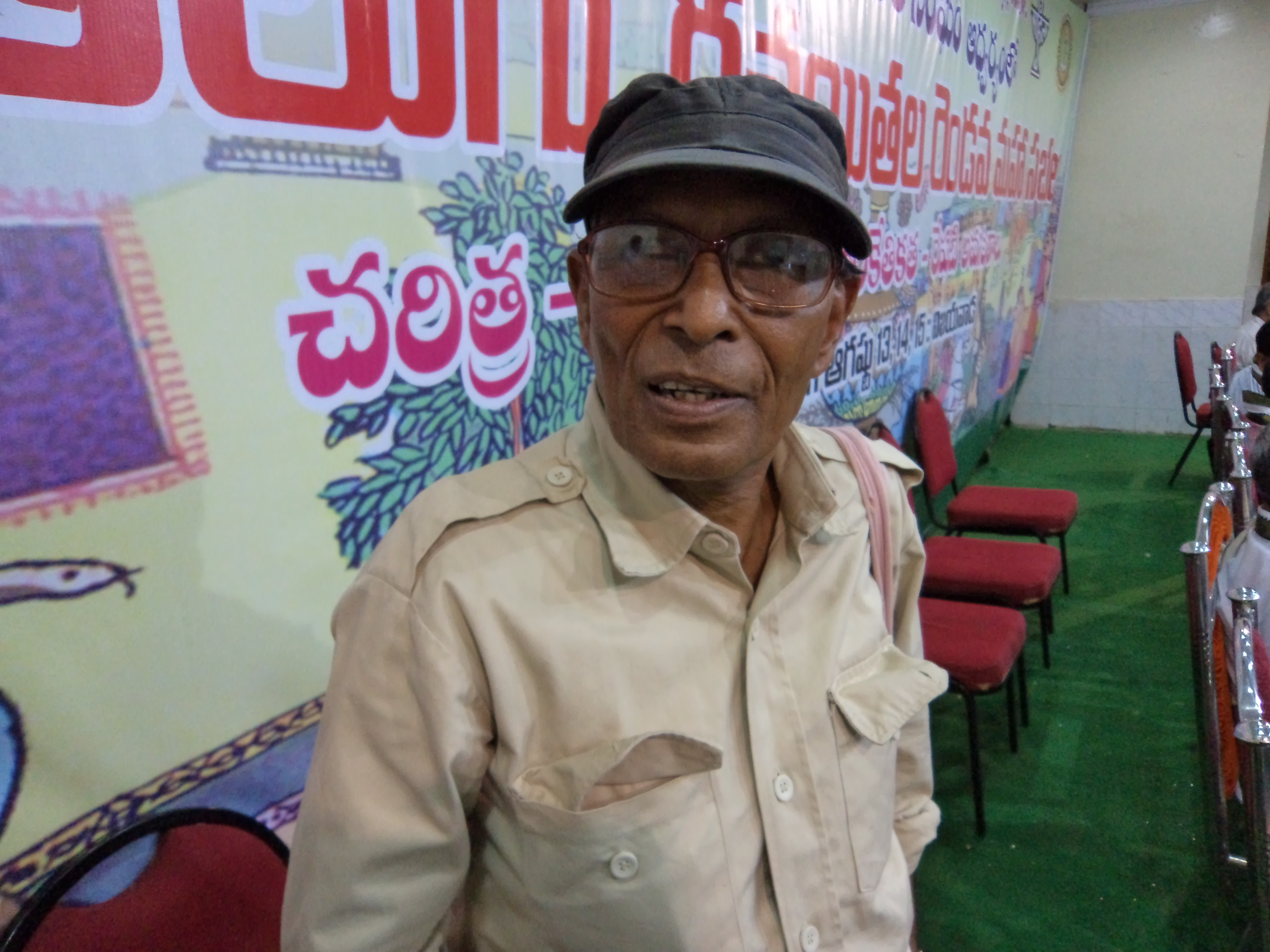
Prasada Rao

Prasada Rao (1943 – 4 August 2020) was an Indian poet, lyricist and actor, better known as ‘Vangapandu’ in the North coastal districts of Andhra Pradesh. He actively participated in Communist lead agitations. He was well known for his multiple talents of composing, singing, dancing, and acting. His revolutionary songs yantrametta nadustumdantee, Jajjenaka janare, eem pillado eldamostavaa, ooda nuv vellipoke etc. are very popular.

== Early life ==
He was born in 1943 in Pedabondappali (village), Parvathipuram (MD), to Jagannadham Naidu and Chinathalli in Parvathipuram Manyam district of Andhra Pradesh. He has expired in the early hours of 4 August 2020.

== Career ==
Vangapandu, Gaddar and B.Narsing Rao founded the Jana Natya Mandali, the cultural wing of the People's War Group in 1972. He has written over 400 songs in the past three decades. Of these, 12 have been translated into 10 Indian languages like Tamil, Bengali, Kannada and Hindi besides all the tribal dialects. His song Yentrametta Nadusthuvundante was translated by a professor into English and was admired both in the United States and in England.

He performed on the invitation of various people's organisations. He gave over 2,000 performances not only in Andhra Pradesh but also in other parts of the country. He also trained youth to sing and dance to the songs.

In 2010, he remixed acclaimed revolutionary song "em pillado" by praising late Y.S Rajashekhar Reddy, which drew heavy criticism from leftist circles.

== Personal life ==
Vangapandu was married and had two sons and a daughter, Vangapandu Usha, also a popular ballad singer. She is now cultural wing secretary in YSR Congress party.

== Popular songs ==
- Emi pilloi yeldamosthava
- Jajjenaka janare
- Nampally station Kada (this song is written by adrusta Deepak)
- Yentrametta nadusthuvundante

== Awards ==
In 2008, he was presented with the Bollimantha Sivarama Krishna Memorial Award in Tenali.
