= John Armstrong (of Carrick) =

English farmer, huntsman, stick dresser and traditional musician

John Armstrong of Carrick (1909 – 1984) was an English farmer, huntsman, stick dresser and traditional musician from near Elsdon, in central Northumberland. His nickname refers to High Carrick, his hill farm on the edge of the Otterburn Army ranges, near Elsdon; Armstrong is a common name in the Borders. He claimed descent from the Border reiver Johnnie Armstrong of Gilnockie. His wife was descended from Muckle Jock Milburn.

He played Northumbrian pipes as a young man, and in later life the fiddle. The Armstrong family claims an unbroken tradition of Northumbrian piping going back at least four generations. The Clough family visited the Armstrong family home at Raylees for several years, just after the First World War, and John often played duets there with Tom Clough. He also later played regularly with Billy Pigg, who wrote several tunes named for him and his family, "The Carrick Hornpipe", "Raylees", "Mary Armstrong", "Jane of Biddlestone", "Anne's Wedding" and "John of Carrick". John, with his sister Annie Snaith, and Billy Pigg, played regularly at events in the area, becoming known as 'The Border Minstrels'. They were joined in 1938 by Archie Dagg. They played for listening, rather than dancing.

John owned a notable collection of pipe and fiddle tunes, including early manuscripts of tunes by James Hill, and autograph manuscripts by Robert Whinham. These provided 88 of the 112 tunes for the Charlton Memorial Tune Book. This book was a major extension to the published repertoire of Northumbrian pipe music, being much larger than the first edition of the Northumbrian Pipers' Society Tune Book. Unfortunately, late in his life, he lent many of his Whinham manuscripts to a friend, and they were lost.

A series of accidents to his hands, resulting in a stiffening of his fingers, forced John to concentrate on the fiddle in later years. He started playing duets with Joe Hutton in 1972, adapting arrangement for two pipes to pipes and fiddle. In 1973 they won the pairs competition at Newcastleton Traditional Festival. He is featured on the Topic album Bonny North Tyne. However a project for a subsequent duet album never materialised, owing to his illness and death. Some recordings of them are available on FARNE, as well as a few of Armstrong on solo fiddle.

FARNE wrongly attributes some compositions to him, but there are no confirmed attributions of any compositions of his; in particular there are none in the Charlton Memorial Book, based on his own collection, where any compositions by him might be expected. However, the jig "Coquet Lights" is widely believed to be by him.
