= George Hepple =

English fiddler

George Hepple (1904–1997) was an influential traditional Northumbrian fiddler. He was born at Sook Hill Farm, Haltwhistle, West Northumberland. He went to a nearby school in Melkridge. He began his working life as an apprentice blacksmith at Cawfield's Quarry at the age of fourteen, before moving to Ventners Hall Colliery where he remained until its closure in the 1950s. He then worked at Bardon Mill Colliery. He later worked in a plastics factory in Plenmellor, South of Haltwistle, until his retirement. In the last years of his life, he lived with his wife Edna in sheltered housing in Haltwhistle. At this time, he also had a pacemaker implanted and when the doctor said he should return to have the battery replaced, in 10 years, he replied "I don't need to worry about that then!".

== Musical life ==
He was born into a musical family; his grandfather had been taught to step-dance by the famous fiddler-composer and dancing master Robert Whinham. Cawfields, the family farm, within sight of the Roman Wall, was the venue for regular musical evenings; these were often held near the full moon, to make travelling over the fells easier. People from nearby farms would walk, while those from further afield might ride.

He was given a three-quarter size fiddle at the age of eight, and taught himself to play, at first practising in the byre, later saying My only audience was the hens. As he progressed, he was invited to play at the family's musical evenings. His son recalled that his first public solo performance was The Ferry Boat at a school concert, at the age of eleven - he was asked to play again for dancing that evening, earning two shillings. From this time onwards, he played regularly at concerts and dances. By the 1920s he was a member of the local dance band, playing mainly country dance music. Just before the war, in 1938, he founded a dance band, The Sylvian Dance Band, with a line up of two fiddles, a piano accordion (the first in the district), piano and drums.

He had been fascinated with the Northumbrian smallpipes for some time, but was frustrated by the considerable difficulty of getting a set at that time. After the war, in 1947, local musician Basil Clough found him a set, from Colin Caisley, and he made some progress on the instrument. His preferred instrument remained the fiddle, however. At this time, the piper Joe Hutton lived nearby at Gilsland, Cumberland and was a frequent visitor. George's son John also took up the smallpipes, and was broadcast by the BBC in 1953, on Children's Hour, presented by Huw Wheldon. John and George made several broadcasts subsequently on the BBC's Barn Dance programme, playing pipe and fiddle duets. Later, both George and Joe Hutton would stay with John, at the time of the annual Pipers' Society competitions in Newcastle, and they would play together from morning till night.

He had strict ideas on fiddle accuracy and playing techniques, and on what constituted a Northumbrian style. He said that formerly, traditional fiddlers would play with the fiddle on the shoulder, rather than under the chin - in particular he stated that Whinham played in this way. The piper Adrian D Schofield, who knew him well, recalls that he used the 'Newcastle' style of bowing, where the bow-strokes go across the beat; he used only the top 3 inches of his bow to get the articulation needed. He also considered Honeyman's Strathspey, Reel and Hornpipe Tutor to be wrong in its teaching of this style. When playing fiddle along with smallpipes, he preferred to play more staccato, to go along with that instrument's articulation.

He also played the Northumberland small-pipes; finger-style G banjo (which he had learned from his brother-in-law); organ and a variety of wind instruments. He composed 'seconds', that is duet settings, for many traditional tunes, but apparently did not write these down. He also wrote and taught music, and judged competitions; in his later years was made an honorary member of the Northumbrian Pipers' Society.

== Recordings ==
Some early recordings of him, made by Peter Kennedy in 1954, one of him playing The Ferry Boat on solo fiddle, and two others of him and his son John playing pipe and fiddle duets, are on the Topic compilation, Holey Ha'penny. Several later recordings of him, as well as an extended interview, are on the FARNE archive, and these give a valuable perspective on his life, playing style and wide repertoire. He was also recorded playing fiddle in six tracks on the Topic record Bonny North Tyne - Northumbrian Country Music, 12TS239; five of these tracks are duets with his nephew, Donald Ridley. Two tracks were of George's own compositions, Geordie's Jig, and a hornpipe, The Burn Divot.
