= Robert Whinham =

English fiddler and composer

Robert Whinham (1814–1893) was a fiddler, composer and dancing master from Morpeth, Northumberland. Many tunes composed by him are still played, notably the Remember Me hornpipe, Whinham's Reel, and The Cambo March. A 1995 book on his life and music, called Remember Me by Graham Dixon, summarises most of what is known about him.

== Early life ==
Whinham was born in 1814, in Morpeth, Northumberland, the son of a market gardener, also named Robert. He was the fourth of five children. Robert Whinham senior is known as the developer of a variety of gooseberry, still cultivated, known as Whinham's Industry. There are few facts known about his life, though his obituary recorded that he had started learning the violin at the age of eight, at first from one William Banks, later from 'a German music master in Newcastle'.

== Career ==
Whinham later organised the Morpeth Brass Band, for much of his life he worked as an itinerant musician and dancing teacher, though frequently returning to Morpeth. In 1854, the Morpeth Philharmonic Society, led by Whinham, gave a concert in Morpeth. There are advertisements for several other engagements around this period. In 1856 and 1857, he led the musicians playing at the Alnwick Sessions Ball, an "annual gathering of the aristocracy of the county of Northumberland". In this year he was also advertising that he "Continues to give instructions on the violin and other instruments. Balls and parties attended with his Quadrille Band. Harmonic and Brass Bands taught." In 1858, he was the conductor of a concert of the Cambo Musical Society at Cambo, not far from Morpeth; one surviving composition of his, The Cambo March, was the finale of this concert. From 1859, there is little or no record of Whinham in or near Morpeth for more than 20 years. George Hepple, of Haltwhistle, in the west of Northumberland, recalled that his grandfather had been taught to stepdance by 'Old Whinham' in the 1860s. He also stated that Whinham played with the fiddle on his shoulder, not under his chin. Many tunes known to be by Whinham have placenames in their titles, suggesting he travelled over much of western and central Northumberland.

His obituary, in 1893, stated that "about a dozen years ago he returned to his native town, a somewhat shattered old man, very much broken down in health". In about 1881, the Morpeth Amateur Orchestral Society was founded, and initially it was "moulded from raw material" by Whinham who taught them "the rudiments of the art". He was still the Society's conductor at a concert in Acklington in 1884. He retired from conducting the Society about then, being replaced by Mr. E.J. Rogers, a musician from Newcastle, who had been in place for some time when the band gave a concert in 1886. At the end of 1883, Whinham placed an advertisement in the Morpeth Herald, stating that "The original R. Whinham is now in Morpeth after an absence of Twenty-four years", and "continues teaching the violin and string bands", and "will supply music for Balls, Parties and Entertainments with his Efficient String Band". That he was able to advertise using the phrase "the original R. Whinham" indicates that his reputation must have been considerable, if he could still rely on it a quarter-century later. Whinham's obituary recorded that he had travelled 'all over England and Scotland'. It was normal for dancing masters of the time to travel around a 'circuit', staying a while in a place to teach pupils and organise a dance for them.

== Death ==
Whinham was still travelling to and from Morpeth even in the last decade of his life; he returned to Morpeth for good in 1892, entering the workhouse there, where he died of cardiac disease on 13 December 1893. He was buried in St. Mary's Churchyard there, although there is no gravestone, which was typical for people who died in the workhouse.

== Compositions ==
Remember Me lists some 60 compositions of his, as well as variation sets by him on traditional tunes, and others attributed to him. They include most of the dance types a dancing master would need, though hornpipes are predominant. Many of his tunes are found in manuscripts belonging to different musicians in Northumberland, notably John Armstrong of Carrick and his sister Annie Snaith. In 1979, Armstrong still possessed many manuscripts of Whinham's, but subsequently he lent them to a friend and they were lost. Nonetheless the Armstrong family's remaining manuscripts were among the main sources used in the preparation of Remember Me.
