= Kerrianne Cox =

- Occupation: Singer
- Instrument: Vocals

Kerrianne Cox is an Aboriginal singer from Beagle Bay in Western Australia. She has toured widely around Australia and toured USA and South Africa and appeared in the musical Bran Nue Dae in 1996.

Cox was nominated in the Deadly Awards for Best Emerging Artist (1998) and Best Female Artist (1999, 2000, 2001), winning in 2001. She won a WAMi in 1997 as Best Indigenous Artist of the Year and in 2002 she received another nomination. In 2000 she was NAIDOC's Female Artist of the Year.

== Discography ==
- Just Wanna Move (1999)
- Opening (2001)
- Return to Country (2006)
