= List of songs featured in Shrek =

The Shrek soundtracks are a collection of soundtracks from all four movies of the Shrek series, including separate editions for the movie score. Each soundtrack contains all songs that featured in their respective film, and the score album contains the music composed by Harry Gregson-Williams and John Powell.

== Shrek (2001) ==
=== Background ===
Shrek was unique in that it used pop music and other oldies to move the story forward. Covers of songs like "On the Road Again" and "Try a Little Tenderness" were integrated in the film's score. The lyrics to "The Gingerbread Man" and "The Muffin Man" were also used as dialogue in a parody interrogation scene between Lord Farquaad and Gingy. As the film was about to be completed, Katzenberg suggested the filmmakers redo the film's ending in order to "go out with a big laugh"; instead of ending the film with a storybook closing over Shrek and Fiona as they ride off into the sunset, they decided to add Smash Mouth's cover of "I'm a Believer" by American pop rock band the Monkees.

Although Rufus Wainwright's version of the song "Hallelujah" appeared in the soundtrack album, it was John Cale's version that appeared in the film. Wainwright was an artist for DreamWorks and John Cale was not, thus licensing issues prohibited Cale's version from appearing in the soundtrack album.

Shrek: Music from the Original Motion Picture is the soundtrack of the 2001 Academy Award-winning and Golden Globe-nominated animated feature Shrek.

The album was nominated for the BAFTA Award for Best Film Music (lost to the score of Moulin Rouge!) and the Grammy Award for "Best Compilation Soundtrack Album for a Motion Picture, Television or Other Visual Media" (lost to the score of O Brother, Where Art Thou?).

The album has sold 2,475,000 copies in the US as of April 2014.

=== Songs that appear in the film but not on the soundtrack album ===
Extra songs in the film but not the soundtrack album
No.	Title	Length
1.	"Meditation" (performed by Antônio Carlos Jobim)
2.	"On the Road Again" (performed by Eddie Murphy)
3.	"Friends" (performed by Eddie Murphy)
4.	"Escape (The Piña Colada Song)" (performed by Rupert Holmes)
5.	"Try a Little Tenderness" (performed by Eddie Murphy)
6.	"Whipped Cream" (performed by Herb Alpert & the Tijuana Brass)

=== Songs in Shrek in the Swamp Karaoke Dance Party! ===
These songs feature in the party at the end of the movie.

- "Just the Way You Are" by Billy Joel (performed by Shrek)
- "Like a Virgin" by Madonna (performed by Fiona)
- "Baby Got Back" by Sir Mix-a-Lot (performed by Donkey, with Dragon)
- "Feelings" by Morris Albert (performed by Thelonious)
- "YMCA" by Village People (performed by Monsieur Hood and the Merry Men)
- "Do You Really Want to Hurt Me" by Culture Club (performed by Gingy and the 3 Blind Mice)
- "Stayin' Alive" by Bee Gees (performed by Farquaad)
- "Who Let the Dogs Out?" by Baha Men (performed by the Big Bad Wolf and the 3 Pigs)
- "Dance to the Music" by Sly & The Family Stone (performed by the entire cast)
- "Happy Together" by The Turtles (performed by Shrek and Fiona)

=== Score ===
Shrek: Original Motion Picture Score is the film score to the 2001 Academy Award winning animated feature, Shrek. It is composed by Harry Gregson-Williams and John Powell and was the second soundtrack released from the film. It is also the third collaboration between Gregson-Williams and Powell for a DreamWorks animated film, the first two being Antz and Chicken Run.

== Shrek 2 (2004) ==
Shrek 2: Motion Picture Soundtrack is the soundtrack for the animated comedy film Shrek 2 and was released on May 11, 2004, to accompany the release of the film. The soundtrack reached the Top 10 on the Billboard 200 and number 1 on the Soundtrack Albums as well as topping the albums chart in Australia. The lead single, "Accidentally in Love" by Counting Crows, reached the Top 10 of the Billboard Adult Top 40, the Top 20 of singles charts worldwide and was nominated for an Academy Award for Best Song. The soundtrack also features two versions of the 1980s Bonnie Tyler hit "Holding Out for a Hero".

- Eddie Murphy is briefly heard singing "One" and the theme song from "Rawhide".
- Ben Folds' song "Rockin' the Suburbs" was used in one of the DVD trailers of the film, but was not included on the soundtrack nor in the film, but it would eventually be featured in another DreamWorks film, Over the Hedge.
- The first trailer features "All Star" by Smash Mouth.
- A cover of the song Sugar, Sugar was recorded by the band Self, for the honeymoon scene in the movie, but went unused for unknown reasons. It was later used on the Shrek 4-D ride in Universal Studios Hollywood. It remains unreleased, with only snippets of the full song remaining.
- When the messengers come to Shrek's swamp, a trumpeter plays the melody of the Hawaii 5-O Opening Theme by Morton Stevens.
- After Shrek's friends start a party in Shrek's house, Chic's song "Le Freak" is heard.
- In the mid-credits scene, Eddie Murphy is heard singing "All by Myself"
- Joseph Arthur's song "You're So True" is the original version in the soundtrack and the remix is heard in the film's end credits. The remix is produced by Tom Rothrock, and the full track is exclusively available to both the physical and iTunes versions released in the UK.
- Nick Cave and the Bad Seeds song "People Ain't No Good" is slightly censored, removing the "shit" from the lyric "bullshit" so that it would be appropriate for inclusion on the soundtrack.

=== Songs from Far Far Away Idol ===
Most of the original voice–actors reprised their roles, with some performed by additional singers.

1. "Disco Inferno" by The Trammps; sung by Donkey (Eddie Murphy)
2. "Mr. Roboto" by Styx; sung by Pinocchio (Cody Cameron)
3. "Girls Just Wanna Have Fun" by Cyndi Lauper; sung by Doris, The Ugly Stepsister (Larry King)
4. "Hungry Like the Wolf" by Duran Duran; sung by the Three Pigs (Cody Cameron) and the Big Bad Wolf (Aron Warner)
5. "I'm Too Sexy" by Right Said Fred; sung by Prince Charming (Randy Crenshaw)
6. "I Can See Clearly Now" by Johnny Nash; sung by The Three Blind Mice (Randy Crenshaw)
7. "Sugar, Sugar" by The Archies; sung by Gingy (Conrad Vernon)
8. "Hooked on a Feeling" by Blue Swede; sung by Captain Hook (Matt Mahaffey)
9. "These Boots Are Made for Walking" by Nancy Sinatra; sung by Puss in Boots (Antonio Banderas)
10. "What I Like About You" by The Romantics; sung by Shrek (Mike Myers, singing voice by Michael Gough) and Fiona (Cameron Diaz, singing voice by Renee Sands)
11. "My Way" by Frank Sinatra; sung by Simon Cowell (singing voice by Rick Riso)

=== Shrek 2: Party CD ===
Shrek 2: Party CD

Soundtrack album by various artists
- Released: November 5, 2004
- Genres: Rock; alternative rock; pop rock
- Length: 33:06
- Labels: DreamWorks, Geffen
- Producers: Matt Mahffey, Mike Himelstein, Sunny Park

Shrek 2: Party CD is a bonus CD released exclusively at US Walmart stores alongside the Shrek 2 film. The bonus CD features six songs taken from the Far Far Away Idol ending featured at the end of the film as well as six karaoke tracks of the same six songs. The songs are credited to the characters who sang the songs.

==== Track listing ====
No.	Title	Writer(s)	Performer(s)	Length
1.	"Disco Inferno"	Leroy Green, Ron Kersey	Donkey	2:48
2.	"These Boots Are Made for Walkin'"	Lee Hazlewood	Puss in Boots	2:25
3.	"I Can See Clearly Now"	Johnny Nash	Three Blind Mice	2:26
4.	"Hooked on a Feeling"	Mark James	Captain Hook	2:18
5.	"I'm Too Sexy"	Fred Fairbrass, Richard Fairbrass, Rob Manzoli	Prince Charming	2:57
6.	"What I Like About You"	Wally Palmar, Mike Skill, Jimmy Marinos	Shrek & Fiona	3:21
7.	"Disco Inferno" (Karaoke)	Green, Kersey		2:51
8.	"These Boots Are Made for Walkin'" (Karaoke)	Hazlewood		2:27
9.	"I Can See Clearly Now" (Karaoke)	Nash		2:41
10.	"Hooked on a Feeling" (Karaoke)	James		2:39
11.	"I'm Too Sexy" (Karaoke)	Fairbrass, Fairbrass, Manzoli		3:05
12.	"What I Like About You" (Karaoke)	Palmar, Skill, Marinos		3:01
Total length:				33:06

=== Score ===
Shrek 2: Original Motion Picture Score is the film score to the 2004 animated feature, Shrek 2, the sequel to the Academy Award winner Shrek. Unlike its predecessor, the score for Shrek 2 was only composed by Harry Gregson-Williams.

== Shrek the Third (2007) ==
Shrek the Third: Motion Picture Soundtrack, the soundtrack for the film Shrek the Third was released on May 15, 2007, on Geffen Records. A wide range of artists are featured in this soundtrack, including Paul McCartney & Wings, Led Zeppelin, Eels, The Ramones, Fergie, and Wolfmother. Eddie Murphy and Antonio Banderas perform another duet, a cover of Sly & the Family Stone's "Thank You (Falettinme Be Mice Elf Agin)".

There is a exclusive song for the Japanese dub, called "Love is the Greatest Thing" by w-inds.

=== Songs that appear in the film but not the soundtrack album ===
- "9 Crimes" (Damien Rice and Lisa Hannigan) – 3:37
- "One" (from A Chorus Line)
- "Aria (Sheep May Safely Graze)" (Johann Sebastian Bach) – 5:39
- "I've Never Been to Me" (Nancy Wilson)
- "Danse Macabre" (Camille Saint-Saëns)
- "Good Morning" (from Babes in Arms)
- "That's What Friends Are For" (Dionne Warwick and Friends)

=== Score ===
Shrek the Third: Original Motion Picture Score is the film score to the 2007 animated feature Shrek the Third, the third movie in the Shrek series. It was composed by British composer Harry Gregson-Williams.

== Shrek Forever After (2010) ==
Shrek Forever After: Music from the Motion Picture, the soundtrack for the film Shrek Forever After was released on May 18, 2010, on DGC and Interscope. A wide range of artists are featured in this soundtrack, including Scissor Sisters, Antonio Banderas, The Carpenters, Mike Simpson, Light FM, Lloyd Hemmings, Landon Pigg, Lucy Schwartz, Lionel Richie, Beastie Boys, Maxine Nightingale and Weezer.

This is the first film in the series that does not feature a cover song by Eddie Murphy, as well as the first to not feature a song by Eels. Unlike the previous three soundtracks, this one features short tracks containing dialogue from the film.

=== Omitted tracks ===
1. "Orinoco Flow" by Enya
2. "For Once in My Life" by Stevie Wonder

=== Score ===
Shrek Forever After: Original Motion Picture Score is the film score to the 2010 animated feature Shrek Forever After, the fourth movie in the Shrek series. It was composed by British composer Harry Gregson-Williams.

== Songs featured in specials and shorts ==
=== Shrek the Halls ===
- "Summer Breeze"
- "Jingle Bells" (sung by Donkey)
- "Here We Come A-wassailing" (sung by Donkey)
- "Because We Can" (by Fatboy Slim)
- "Jingo (Gin Go La Ba)" (by Santana)
- "Ride of the Valkyries"
- "The Twelve Days of Christmas"
- "Santa Claus is Comin' to Town"
- "O Fortuna"
- "Christmas Wrapping"
- "Gonna Make You Sweat (Everybody Dance Now)"
- "Don't Stop Believin'" by Journey
- "Hello Ma Baby"
- "Hallelujah Chorus"
- "Deck the Halls"
- "The Stars Shine in the Sky Tonight"

=== Scared Shrekless ===
- "Happy Together"
- "Tubthumping"
- "You Should Be Dancing"
- "Boogie Fever"
- "Don't Go Breaking My Heart"
- "Unchained Melody"
- "Tutti Frutti"
- "Got to Get You into My Life"
- "U Can't Touch This"
- "Livin' la Vida Loca"

=== Donkey's Caroling Christmas-tacular ===
- "It's the Most Wonderful Time of the Year" by Donkey
- "Jingle Bells" by Shrek, Fiona, the Ogre Babies & the Ogres
- "Feliz Navidad" (as "Fleas Navidad") by Puss in Boots
- "Jingle Bell Rock" (as "Fairy Tale Rock") by the entire cast

=== Thriller Night ===
- "Thriller" by Donkey & Puss in Boots
