= Cowboys & Aliens (soundtrack) =

Cowboys & Aliens (Original Motion Picture Soundtrack)

Film score by Harry Gregson-Williams
- Released: July 25, 2011
- Genre: Film score
- Length: 56:55
- Label: Varèse Sarabande
- Producer: Harry Gregson-Williams

Harry Gregson-Williams chronology
Unstoppable (2010)	Cowboys & Aliens (2011)	Arthur Christmas (2011)

Cowboys & Aliens (Original Motion Picture Soundtrack) is the score album to the 2011 film of the same name directed by Jon Favreau, featuring original score composed by Harry Gregson-Williams and performed by the Hollywood Studio Symphony. The album was released on July 25, 2011 by Varèse Sarabande featuring 17 tracks from the score.

== Background ==
In November 2010, Harry Gregson-Williams was announced as the composer for the film. In an interview to Variety, Williams said "My first ports-of-call were the central characters. Both are chasing something, and they don't stop until they've got it. Also, both are honest about themselves and their surroundings." The score consisted of orchestra and choir, with the inclusion of guitars involved as he had "to nod to the musical conventions of the Western" and to suit the nature of Jake Lonergan (Daniel Craig) giving the music an "outdoorsy quality". The score initially had a familiar sound to start, but with the arrival of aliens, it transformed into a blend of "electronic pulses and guitar riffs with moody, noir-ish figures and the expansive gestures typical of sci-fi music".

== Reception ==
The album received mixed reviews from critics. James Christopher Monger of AllMusic wrote "The score, which fuses the patriotic action cues of Alan Silvestri with the dusty guitar- and horn-laden patina of Ennio Morricone, owes a lot to Greg Edmonson's genre-bending work on Joss Whedon's Firefly series, but Gregson-Williams strikes a nice enough balance between whimsical and melodramatic, ending up on the spirited rather than the contrived end of the spectrum." Filmtracks.com wrote "Cowboys & Aliens is a functional and mildly entertaining score with roughly ten to fifteen minutes of truly engaging highlights, but it fails to leave a lasting positive impression due to its surprisingly conventional personality."

James Southall of Movie Wave wrote "For most of its hour-long run-time, the album just plods along without doing much of anything. From time to time it springs to life and these moments rescue it from being a disaster – but even here the music just sounds generic and like it could come from pretty much any Remote Control-scored action film. This is music which just doesn't have a personality, doesn't really have anything about it which I can think would make anyone listen to it before any of the numerous things which are similar but better or the vastly-more-numerous-still things which are not similar but which are better. It's hard to imagine why anyone would want music like this in their film – I can't believe Gregson-Williams would have written music like this if he had his own way and I can't believe that director Jon Favreau wanted this either, he was presumably overruled as on Iron Man – it's not awful by any means, it just all seems fairly pointless." Germain Lussier of /Film wrote "the score by Harry Gregson-Williams fails to increase the tension or emotion".

== Track listing ==
No.	Title	Length
1.	"Jake Lonergan"	3:07
2.	"Palms To Heaven"	2:24
3.	"Col. Woodrow Dolarhyde"	4:51
4.	"Attack & Abductions"	4:22
5.	"A Kid, A Dog & A Woman"	3:57
6.	"Emmett's Close Encounter"	4:54
7.	"Alien Air Attack"	3:04
8.	"She's Gone"	4:36
9.	"I Know Where They Are"	6:28
10.	"Jake's Army"	2:40
11.	"Godspeed"	3:34
12.	"Goodbye Jake"	2:50
13.	"I See Them"	3:31
14.	"Ella's Mission"	2:04
15.	"Do You Remember Me?"	1:48
16.	"Return To The Cabin"	1:12
17.	"See You Around"	1:33
Total length:		56:55

== Personnel ==
Credits adapted from CD liner notes.

- Music composed and conducted by – Harry Gregson-Williams
- Additional music – Halli Cauthery
- Recording – Adam Michalak
- Programming – Anthony Lledo, Hybrid
- Technical engineer – Slamm Andrews, Costa Kotselas
- Mixing – Malcolm Luker
- Mastering – Patricia Sullivan Fourstar
- Score editor – Richard Whitfield
- Assistant score editor – Meri Gavin
- Copyist – Booker White
- Scoring crew – David Marquette, Greg Loskorn, Mark Eshelman
- Executive producer – Jon Favreau, Robert Townson

Instruments

- Bass – Bruce Morgenthaler, Christian Kollgaard, Drew D Dembowski, Edward Meares, Michael Valerio, Nicolas Philippon, Oscar Hidalgo, Stephen Dress, Nico Carmine Abondolo
- Bassoon – Rose Corrigan, Kenneth Munday
- Cello – Andrew T. Shulman, Antony Cooke, Armen Ksajikian, Cecelia Tsan, Christina Soule, Dennis Karmazyn, Erika Duke-Kirkpatrick, George Kim Scholes, Giovanna Clayton, John Walz, Martin Tillmann, Steven Velez, Timothy Landauer, Steve Erdody
- Clarinet – Donald Foster, Stuart Clark
- Electric cello – Martin Tillman
- Flute – Heather Clark, Geraldine Rotella
- Guitar – Anthony Lledo, George Doering, Heitor Pereira, Tony Clarke, William P. Olvis
- Horn – David Everson, David Duke, Mark L. Adams, James W Thatcher
- Oboe – Barbara Northcutt, Chris Bleth
- Percussion – Andrew Grueschow, Austin Wrinkle, Brad Dutz, Donald J Williams, Peter Limonick, Randy Gloss, Wade Culbreath, Marvin B Gordy III
- Trombone – William F Reichenbach, Steven M Holtman, William Booth, Alexander Iles
- Trumpet – Jon Lewis, Malcolm Mc Nab
- Tuba – Doug Tornquist
- Viola – Alma L. Fernandez, Andrew Duckles, Darrin McCann, David F. Walther, Marlow Fisher, Matthew Funes, Michael Nowak, Robert A. Brophy, Roland Kato, Shawn Mann, Victoria Miskolczy, Brian Dembow
- Violin – Alyssa Park, Amy Hershberger, Bruce Dukov, Darius Campo, Dimitrie Leivici, Eun-Mee Ahn, Helen Nightengale, Irina Voloshina, Jay Rosen, Jeanne Skrocki, Josefina Vergara, Katia Popov, Kevin Connolly, Lisa M. Sutton, Marc Sazer, Miwako Watanabe, Natalie Leggett, Nina Evtuhov, Phillip Levy, Rafael Rishik, Richard L Altenbach, Roberto Cani, Roger Wilkie, Sara Parkins, Sarah Thornblade, Searmi Park, Serena Mc Kinney, Tamara Hatwan, Tereza L. Stanislav, Julie Ann Gigante

Orchestra

- Performer – The Hollywood Studio Symphony
- Orchestration – Ladd McIntosh
- Recording – Jamie Luker
- Concertmaster – Endre Granat
- Orchestra contractor – Peter Rotter

Choir

- Alto – Adriana Manfredi, Aleta Braxton, Alexys Schwartz, Amber Erwin, Amy Fogerson, Donna Davidson Medine, Drea Pressley, Kimberly Switzer, Leanna Brand, Lesley Leighton, Marijke Van Nierkerk, Michele Hemmings, Nancy Sulahian, Nike St. Clair, Tracy Van Fleet
- Soprano – Ayana Haviv, Claire Fedoruk, Diane Freiman Reynolds, Elin Carlson, Elissa Johnston, Elyse Marchant, Harriet Fraser, Jennifer Graham, Jessica Rotter, Karen Hogle Brown, Karen Whipple Schnurr, Samela Beasom, Suzanne Waters, Tyler Azleton
- Solo vocalist – Lisbeth Scott
- Choir contractor – Jasper Randall
