= X-Men Origins: Wolverine (soundtrack) =

X-Men Origins: Wolverine – Original Motion Picture Soundtrack

Film score by Harry Gregson-Williams
- Released: April 28, 2009
- Recorded: March–April 2009
- Studios: Newman Scoring Stage, Twentieth Century Fox Studios
- Genre: Film score
- Length: 45:32
- Labels: Varèse Sarabande; Fox Music
- Producer: Harry Gregson-Williams

Harry Gregson-Williams chronology
The Chronicles of Narnia: Prince Caspian (2008)	X-Men Origins: Wolverine (2009)	The Taking of Pelham 123 (2009)

X-Men Origins: Wolverine – Original Motion Picture Soundtrack is the soundtrack to the 2009 superhero film X-Men Origins: Wolverine directed by Gavin Hood, based on the Marvel Comics fictional character Wolverine and starred Hugh Jackman as the titular character. It is the fourth installment of the X-Men film series, the first installment of the Wolverine trilogy within the series, and a spin-off/prequel to X-Men (2000) and X2 (2003). The film's score composed and conducted by Harry Gregson-Williams and performed by the Hollywood Studio Symphony, released through the Varèse Sarabande and Fox Music record labels, three days before the film. The score, however, received mixed reviews.

== Development ==
The film marked Gregson-Williams' first collaboration with Hood and his maiden score for a superhero feature. In a 2008 interview with Christopher Coleman of Tracksounds.com, Gregson-Williams said that he met Hood during the 63rd Golden Globe Awards in 2006, where they received their respective nominations: Best Original Score for The Chronicles of Narnia: The Lion, the Witch and the Wardrobe (2005) and Best Foreign Language Film for Tsotsi, though not winning any. During their discussion at the dinner party held after the ceremony, they shared several discussions regarding music which led Hood attracted him to the project. He felt "delighted" when he received a call from Hood to collaborate for the film's music, which he agreed.

In late March 2009, Jon Burlingame of Variety was at the Newman Scoring Stage at 20th Century Fox to listen and report on the recording of the score. Gregson-Williams conducted "a 78-piece orchestra and a 40-voice choir (20 male, 20 female)" to achieve the sound. At the time of his visit, Burlingame noted that the choir was singing "stanzas from an ancient Norse poem in Old Icelandic" to underscore what would be first track, "Logan Through Time." Director Gavin Hood commented on Gregson-Williams' style, saying: "Harry's challenge is to give us operatic scale, but also keep it intimate and human. Harry's music has a kind of muscular confidence and strength that is very useful for the action, but he also has tremendous soul." Hood also called the recording performance "frigging brilliant!"

== Track listing ==
No.	Title	Length
1.	"Logan Through Time"	04:16
2.	"Special Priviledges"	01:58
3.	"Lagos, Nigeria"	05:10
4.	"Wade Goes To Work"	01:29
5.	"Kayla"	02:50
6.	"Victor Visits"	02:05
7.	"Adamantium"	04:17
8.	"Agent Zero Comes For Logan"	03:06
9.	"Logan Meets Gambit"	04:36
10.	"To The Island"	03:43
11.	"Deadpool"	04:09
12.	"The Towers Collapse"	03:23
13.	"Memories Lost"	02:56
14.	"...I'll Find My Own Way"	01:24
Total length:		45:22

== Personnel ==
Credits adapted from CD liner notes:

- Music composed and produced by – Harry Gregson-Williams
- Additional music – Halli Cauthery
- Compiler – Slamm Andrews
- Additional programming – Hybrid
- Programming assistance – Anthony Lledo
- Recording – Joel Iwataki
- Digital recordists – Jamie Luker, Tom Hardisty
- Mixing – Malcom Luker
- Mastering – Erick Labson
- Music editor – Richard Whitfield
- Assistant music editor – Meri Gavin
- Technical engineer – Costa Kotselas
- Music production co-ordinator – Rebecca Morellato
- Music supervisor – Danielle Diego
- Executive producer – Robert Townson
- Music preparation – Booker White
- Business affairs (20th Century Fox) – Tom Cavanaugh
- Executive in charge of music (20th Century Fox) – Robert Kraft

Orchestra

- Performer – The Hollywood Studio Symphony
- Orchestration – Ladd McIntosh
- Conductor – Harry Gregson-Williams
- Orchestra contractor – Peter Rotter, Sandy De Crescent
- Concertmaster – Endre Granat

Instruments

- Bass – Nico Abondolo (principal), Christian Kollgaard, David Parmeter, Drew Dembowski, Edward Meares, Oscar Hidalgo
- Bassoon – Michael O'Donovan (principal), Kenneth Munday
- Cello – Steve Erdody (principal), Antony Cooke, Armen Ksajikian, Christine Ermacoff, Dennis Karmazyn, George Kim Scholes, Jennifer Lee Kuhn, Martin Tillman, Paula Hochhalter, Stan Sharp, Trevor Handy
- Clarinet – Stuart Clark (principal), Ralph Williams
- Electric cello – Martin Tillman
- Electric violin – Hugh Marsh
- Flute – David Shostac, Geraldine Rotella, Heather Clark, James Walker
- Harp – Jo Ann Turovsky
- Horn – James Thatcher (principal), Brian O'Connor, Daniel Kelley, David Duke, Mark Adams, Richard Todd, Steven Becknell
- Oboe – David Weiss (principal), Chris Bleth
- Percussion – Alex Nesciosup-Acuña, Brian Kilgore, Michael Fisher
- Processed trumpet – Michael White
- Trombone – Alexander Iles (principal), William Reichenbach, Phillip Teele, William Booth
- Trumpet – Malcolm McNab (principal), David Washburn, Jon Lewis
- Tuba – Doug Tornquist
- Viola – Brian Dembow (principal), Andrew Duckles, Cassandra Richburg, Darrin McCann, David Walther, Denyse Buffum, Keith Greene, Matthew Funes, Robert Brophy, Steven Gordon, Thomas Diener, Victoria Miskolczy
- Violin – Julie Ann Gigante (principal), Aimee Kreston, Alan Grunfeld, Alyssa Park, Anatoly Rosinsky, Armen Anassian, Bruce Dukov, Caroline Campbell, Charlie Bisharat, Darius Campo, Dimitrie Leivici, Eric Hosler, Eun-Mee Ahn, Helen Nightengale, Irina Voloshina, Ishani Bhoola, Jacqueline Brand, Kenneth Yerke, Lorenz Gamma, Marc Sazer, Miwako Watanabe, Natalie Leggett, Nina Evtuhov, Phillip Levy, Rafael Rishik, Richard Altenbach, Roberto Cani, Sara Parkins, Sarah Thornblade, Searmi Park, Serena McKinney

Vocals

- Alto – Aleta Braxton, Alice Kirwan-Murray, Amber Erwin, Amy Fogerson, Donna Medine, Drea Pressley, Edie Lehmann Boddicker, Kimberly Switzer, Michele Hemmings, Nancy Sulahian, Niké St. Clair
- Bass and baritone – Ed Levy, Greg Davies, Gregg Geiger, Jim Campbell, Jules Green, Mark Beasom, Mark Edward Smith, Michael Geiger, Reid Bruton, Scott Graff, Vatsche Barsoumian
- Soprano – Claire Fedoruk, Diane Freiman Reynolds, Elin Carlson, Elissa Johnston, Jennifer Graham, Joanna Bushnell, Karen Hogle Brown, Karen Whipple Schnurr, Lesley Leighton, Monique Donnelly, Samela Beasom, Teri Koide
- Tenor – Agostino Castagnola, Amick Byram, Chris Gambol, George Sterne, Gerald White, Jasper Randall, Jonathan Mack, Michael Lichtenauer, Sean McDermott, Shawn Kirchner, Steve Dunham
- Vocal contractor – Jasper Randall

== Reception ==
Thomas Glorieux of Maintitles wrote "For rookies X-Men Origins: Wolverine will suffice, for die hard listeners it will not." James Southall of Movie Wave wrote "If you don’t pay much attention to the music and just let it drift into your consciousness when it becomes a bit more interesting, then there are some moments on the album which are worthy of consideration – unfortunately it tends to be a few moments here and there rather than any complete pieces." While Kirk Honeycutt of The Hollywood Reporter felt Gregson-Williams' score "drives the movie faster and faster", Collider's Steve Weintraub criticized it as "awful" and it "smothers every emotion with music that thinks you're too stupid to know what to feel".

Filmtracks.com wrote "Gregson-Williams' score is the kind of formulaic application of music to a substandard superhero action film that will most likely be dismissed by those outside of his loyal collecting group. That's a fair response, though this score is better than many to grace similarly underachieving films of the era. Approach with low expectations and you might be rewarded." Jonathan Broxton commented "although none of the previous X-Men scores were truly outstanding, Gregson-Williams has the chops to deliver something a less conservative and predictable than a modern hybrid score that never really develops much beyond being just ‘OK’." Mark Morton of AllMusic wrote "Gregson-Williams echoes the films' dramatic sequences with lush choir and orchestration, and accentuates the intense action scenes with suspenseful electronica."

== Charts ==
Chart performance for X-Men Origins: Wolverine – Original Motion Picture Soundtrack
Chart (2009)	Peak position
UK Soundtrack Albums (OCC)	26
US Top Soundtracks (Billboard)	22
