= Arthur Christmas (soundtrack) =

2011 film soundtrack album

Arthur Christmas: Original Motion Picture Soundtrack

Film score by Harry Gregson-Williams
- Released: 14 November 2011
- Venue: September–October 2011
- Studio: Abbey Road Studios, London
- Genre: Film score
- Length: 46:50
- Label: Madison Gate Records
- Producer: Harry Gregson-Williams

Harry Gregson-Williams chronology
Cowboys & Aliens (2011)	Arthur Christmas (2011)	Total Recall (2012)

Arthur Christmas: Original Motion Picture Soundtrack is the score album to the film of the same name directed by Sarah Smith. The film's original score is composed and produced by Harry Gregson-Williams and released on 14 November 2011 by Madison Gate Records. The music was described by Gregson-Williams as "a very much tune-led, melody-led, theme-led score, utilising a large and colorful orchestration". It received positive reviews from music critics.

== Development ==
In March 2010, Michael Giacchino was hired to score music, and was joined by singer-songwriter Adam Cohen to score additional music on that November. However, in September 2011, Harry Gregson-Williams replaced Giacchino at the last minute, due to creative differences. Gregson-Williams had previously worked with Aardman Animations on Chicken Run (2000) and Flushed Away (2006), both were co-produced with DreamWorks Animation. This also marks as Gregson-Williams first score for an animated film that's not from DreamWorks, since The Tigger Movie (2000) by Walt Disney Pictures. Unlike Flushed Away, which had only needle drops of songs in the film being placed, and the score was being minimal, the film had only one song at the end credits, thereby having much scope for the score to contribute the film. He had only four to five weeks for scoring which was "abnormal" for any animated film, but called it as "wonderful" as it had "action-adventure, with a great emotional charge" and being a Christmas film which he had never done.

Gregson-Williams felt that the Christmas film is being a fresh genre and has no antagonists as "the only thing is the threat that Arthur has of the possibility of one child not getting a Christmas present on Christmas morning". He felt that the film's animation is much different to that of Shrek and also superior to Flushed Away as DreamWorks being involved in both the projects and Sony Animation being involved in Arthur Christmas, who were supportive in making this film. While recording and mixing the score at Abbey Road Studios, the orchestra included over 70 to 80 performers.

== Composition ==
Gregson-Williams felt that the film was perfect for some thematic material. The protagonist's theme appeared in the end of the film and a nostalgic tune was played for GrandSanta character, who represent the old way to doing things. He used the sound of tubular bells played outside his studio while recording. On the film's music approach, Gregson-Williams said:

"there are two distinct approaches to how the Santa Claus family sees Christmas. One through the eldest son played by Hugh Laurie, that is all about technology, about an overview as opposed to detail. And then, the opposite of that, which is Arthur and his grandfather, who are much more interested in details, and the fact that one child might be left behind. Musically, I was able to reflect that through this very energetic music that's often driven by loops, custom-developed by me for the purpose, loops that you wouldn't necessarily expect here."

He further incorporated instruments he associated with Christmas, which includes kantele, a Finland-based instrument which he used in The Chronicles of Narnia: The Lion, the Witch and the Wardrobe (2005) for creating crystalline-kind of sounds. However, while writing music for Arthur and his Grandfather he was devoid of the contemporary tech music, but a nostalgic one which felt organic and orchestral. At the end of the score, the approaches collide and mix together which was "very satisfying to tie up the themes in the last five or six minutes of the film". In addition to those two aspects, he added an intrusion of NATO which had a "quite serious music that completes the themes".

== Track listing ==
No.	Title	Length
1.	"Trelew, Cornwall, England"	1:48
2.	"Operation Christmas"	4:54
3.	"Waker!"	2:51
4.	"Mission Control"	2:55
5.	"One Missed Child"	3:00
6.	"Bring Them Home"	1:43
7.	"Dash Away"	3:46
8.	"Paris Zoo?"	2:29
9.	"The Wrong Trelew"	1:54
10.	"Race to Gwen's House"	2:09
11.	"Arthur's Sadness"	2:22
12.	"Serengeti Escape"	2:24
13.	"Worry Me!"	1:37
14.	"Space Travel"	2:48
15.	"Goodbye Evie"	2:48
16.	"Christmas Morning"	4:00
17.	"We Wish You A..."	0:48
18.	"Make Someone Happy" (Performed by Bill Nighy)	2:34
Total length:		46:50

== Reception ==
Filmtracks.com wrote, "Gregson-Williams did an admirable job for Arthur Christmas. The thematic attributions don't seem as complexly layered as they could have been, probably due to time constraints, but the 47-minute album is breezy entertainment that surpasses most of its peers in the genre." James Southall of Movie Wave wrote, "Throughout, he injects a real sense of magic – there are big themes, there's a big orchestra, there's an obvious big smile on the faces of everyone involved in its production which inevitably finds its way onto the listener. It's hard to imagine anyone not being won over by its charms – a little like Randy Newman's Pixar scores, there's nothing here to dislike – it's well-composed music, perhaps not with the spectacular clarity of orchestration that Newman offers, but the inherent goodness of it all is a joy to behold. Direct Christmas references are few and far between – this is not one of those Christmas scores which people will only listen to during December – but it's well and truly a Christmas cracker." Maintitles.net wrote, "it is a return to the scores that sky rocketed his career in the late 90's and in the early millennium. Scores like Sinbad and The Borrowers will definitely come to mind when listening to Arthur Christmas. Showing us that Harry Gregson-Williams still has it in him, if he just pushes himself a little bit." The Hollywood Reporter, Variety's Peter Debruge and The Patriot Ledger's Brett Michel called Gregson-Williams' score as "buoyant" and "zippy".

== Credits ==
Credits adapted from CD liner notes.

- Music – Harry Gregson-Williams
- Additional music – Chris Bacon, Halli Cauthery
- Recording – Peter Cobbin
- Editing – Kirsty Whalley, Meri Gavin, Tony Lewis
- Arrangements – Phillip Klein
- Assistant engineers – Andrew Dudman, John Barrett, Sam OKell
- Technicians – Costa Kotselas, Peter Hutchings, Rob Houston
- Copyist – Booker White, Jill Streater
- Music co-ordinator – Tim Ahlering
- Orchestration – Jennifer Hammond, Ladd McIntosh
- Orchestra co-ordinator – Esther McIntosh, Becky Bentham
- Orchestra contractor – Isobel Griffiths
- Assistant orchestra contractor – Jo Buckley
- Concertmaster – Perry Montague-Mason
- Conductor – Harry Gregson-Williams, Nick Ingman
- Choir – Apollo Voices
- Art direction, design – Elizabeth Prochnow, Matt Dames
- Kantele – Timo Väänänen
