= Shrek Forever After (score) =

2010 film soundtrack album

Shrek Forever After (Original Motion Picture Score)

Film score by Harry Gregson-Williams
- Released: May 25, 2010
- Genre: Film score
- Length: 42:24
- Label: Varèse Sarabande

Harry Gregson-Williams chronology
Shrek the Third: The Motion Picture Score (2007)	Shrek Forever After (Original Motion Picture Score) (2010)	Puss in Boots (2011)

Shrek Forever After (Original Motion Picture Score) is the film score to the 2010 DreamWorks Animation film Shrek Forever After, which is the fourth instalment in the Shrek franchise and a sequel to Shrek the Third (2007). The film score is composed by recurring franchise collaborator Harry Gregson-Williams and featured 16 tracks. It was released through Varèse Sarabande on May 25, 2010.

== Background ==
Frequent franchise collaborator Harry Gregson-Williams returned to score Shrek Forever After. Like all the previous films, he began writing the score after watching the film and felt emotionally connected with the characters. Besides deriving the themes for previous newly debuted characters, he also wrote a theme for Rumpelstiltskin.

== Reception ==
Gregory Heaney of AllMusic wrote "even though it might not be as toe-tappingly catchy as many Disney soundtracks, Gregson-Williams' work on the series helps to create the kind of depth that has made the franchise a hit with kids and adults alike". Christian Clemmensen of Filmtracks wrote "In conjunction with the concurrent release of the impressive music for Prince of Persia: The Sands of Time, Shrek Forever After confirms that Gregson-Williams is contributing substantially to the remarkable year for film music that 2010 has become through its first half. Don't be surprised if some fans of the composer find themselves revisiting Shrek Forever After far more frequently than Prince of Persia, because it's always pleasing to hear an old friend sent off on a high note."

James Southall of Movie Wave wrote "much of the material is rather familiar – but this is probably the most satisfying of all the Shrek albums and should appeal to fans of good-natured orchestral adventure scores in general (and of course Gregson-Williams fans in particular)". Kirk Honeycutt of The Hollywood Reporter and John Anderson of Variety called the score "exciting" and "perfect".

== Track listing ==
All tracks are written by Harry Gregson-Williams.

No.	Title	Length
1.	"Once (More) Upon a Time"	1:59
2.	"Rumpelstiltskin"	3:30
3.	"Same Day, Every Day"	3:32
4.	"Shrek Signs the Deal"	3:36
5.	"Rumpel's Kingdom"	4:21
6.	"The Exit Clause"	2:36
7.	"Ogre Resistance"	1:50
8.	""Din Din!""	0:28
9.	"Rumpel's Announcement"	3:17
10.	"Planning the Attack"	2:10
11.	"Fiona Doesn't Love Me"	3:17
12.	"Deal of a Lifetime"	3:04
13.	"The Main Event"	1:49
14.	"Rumpel's Defeat"	2:22
15.	"His Day Is Up"	2:43
16.	"Never Been Better"	1:31
Total length:		42:24

== Personnel ==
Credits adapted from liner notes:

- Music composer and producer – Harry Gregson-Williams
- Additional music – Halli Cauthery
- Musical arrangements – Chris Willis
- Technical engineer – Costa Kotselas
- Assistant engineer – Paul Pritchard
- Pro-tools – Lewis Jones
- Recording – Peter Cobbin
- Mixing – Malcolm Luker
- Mixing assistant – Jamie Luker
- Mastering – Dave Donnelly
- Music editor – Richard Whitfield
- Assistant music editor – Meri Gavin
- Score editor – Kirsty Whalley
- Music supervisor – Charlene Ann Huang
- Executive producer – Robert Townson
- Score coordinator – Esther McIntosh
- Music coordinator – Roger Tang
- Music business affairs – Dan Butler, Jennifer Schiller, Liz McNicholl
- Music clearance – Julie Butchko
- Executive in charge of music for DreamWorks Animation – Sunny Park

Orchestra

- Supervising orchestrator – Ladd McIntosh
- Orchestrators – Geoff Stradling, Jennifer Hammond, Kevin Kliesch
- Orchestra conductor – Harry Gregson-Williams
- Orchestra leader – Perry Montague-Mason
- Orchestra contractor – Isobel Griffiths
- Assistant orchestra contractor – Jo Buckley

Choir

- Choir – Apollo Voices
- Choirmaster – Chris Foster

Instruments

- Cello – Jonathan Williams
- Clarinet – Nicholas Bucknall
- Double Bass – Allen Walley, Steve Mair
- Flute – Anna Noakes, Jonathan Snowden
- Guitar – Anthony Lledo, Tony Morales
- Harp – Skaila Kanga
- Trombone – Peter Davies
- Trumpet – Daniel Newell
- Viola – Bruce White, George Robertson, Rachel Bolt
- Violin – Chris Clad, Mark Berrow, Oliver Langford, Tom Pigott-Smith, Halli Cauthery

== Awards and nominations ==
Accolades received by Shrek Forever After
Award	Date of ceremony	Category	Recipient(s)	Result	Ref.
Annie Awards	February 5, 2011	Outstanding Achievement for Music in a Feature Production	Harry Gregson-Williams	Nominated	
International Film Music Critics Association	February 15, 2011	Best Original Score for an Animated Film	Harry Gregson-Williams	Nominated	
