= Sinbad: Legend of the Seven Seas (soundtrack) =

2003 film soundtrack album

Sinbad: Legend of the Seven Seas (Original Motion Picture Score)

Film score by Harry Gregson-Williams
- Released: June 24, 2003
- Recorded: 2003
- Studios: Abbey Road Studios, London
- Genre: Film score
- Length: 64:30
- Label: DreamWorks
- Producer: Meri Gavin

Harry Gregson-Williams chronology
Phone Booth (2002)	Sinbad: Legend of the Seven Seas (2003)	Veronica Guerin (2003)

Sinbad: Legend of the Seven Seas (Original Motion Picture Score) is the soundtrack album composed by Harry Gregson-Williams for the film of the same name and released by DreamWorks Records on June 24, 2003.

== Background ==
Sinbad: Legend of the Seven Seas is scored by Harry Gregson-Williams, marking his fourth collaboration with DreamWorks after Antz (1998), Chicken Run (2000) and Shrek (2001), and also his maiden film as the sole composer for DreamWorks, as in his previous films, he co-composed them with John Powell. This is also the only DreamWorks hand-drawn film without the involvement of Hans Zimmer who had composed previous hand-drawn projects. Gregson-Williams followed an old-school swashbuckling adventure music blending large orchestra with subtle electronic elements. DreamWorks' CEO Jeffrey Katzenberg had praised Gregson-Williams' ability to write grand orchestral themes in comparison with what John Williams did for Star Wars and Indiana Jones.

== Release ==
Sinbad: Legend of the Seven Seas (Original Motion Picture Score) was released through DreamWorks Records on June 24, 2003. It was also one of the last DreamWorks' soundtrack album solely released through DreamWorks Records after Universal Music Group acquired the label in November 2003, five months after the film's release. The soundtracks for Shrek 2 and Shark Tale were released in association with Geffen Records and UMG Soundtracks.

== Reception ==
Jonathan Broxton of Movie Music UK wrote "In a year where there have been more film music misses than hits, and when scores which promised much have generally failed to deliver, it is a breath of fresh air to hear something like Sinbad: Legend of the Seven Seas. While it may be wholly predictable, and while it certainly treads no new ground in its music depiction of buccaneers and their cinematic adventures, this is still one of 2003's most enjoyably raucous scores. As an example of fine, modern orchestral and choral film music, you are unlikely to find better."

Thomas Glorieux of Maintitles.net wrote "Looking back after all this time, there remains a lot to like of Sinbad. It's fun, to the point, contains rousing orchestral and choral music, and it houses one gigantic fun main theme. Truthfully it's enough and perhaps Harry Gregson-Williams should return once more to the projects he thinks are fun. Because it isn't a surprise to discover that adventure epics like Sinbad and Prince of Persia offered Harry not only a big palette to work with, but also inspired him to write something epic in return."

Christian Clemmensen of Filmtracks wrote "The sum of Sinbad: Legend of the Seven Seas, at the very least, surpasses all of Gregson-Williams' collaborative efforts with Powell, and stands as arguably the strongest score for a DreamWorks animated film." William Ruhlmann of AllMusic wrote "Gregson-Williams doesn't break any new ground here (and you'd hardly expect him to for a film intended for younger viewers), but he adds considerably to the film's already over the top style."

Todd McCarthy of Variety wrote "Music by DreamWorks regular Harry Gregson-Williams is vigorously supportive." Ben Simon of Animated Views said, "The musical score fares little better, with Harry Gregson-Williams seemingly quite happy to sit back and revise several themes from The Road to El Dorado score (shades of the "Team Zimmer" approach coming through good and strong most of the time). There are some memorable theme moments, but these never really repeat themselves enough to become motifs, and about the only reason to buy the soundtrack score would be for the choral theme that intros the film."

== Track listing ==
All music is composed by Harry Gregson-Williams, except as noted.

No.	Title	Length
1.	"Let the Games Begin"	3:04
2.	"The Book of Peace"	1:41
3.	"The Sea Monster"	3:32
4.	"Sinbad Overboard"	3:27
5.	"Syracuse"	1:16
6.	"Proteus Proposes"	1:12
7.	"Eris Steals the Book"	1:53
8.	"Lighting Lanterns"	1:29
9.	"The Stowaway"	2:35
10.	"Setting Sail"	1:40
11.	"Sirens"	3:22
12.	"Chipped Paint"	2:52
13.	"The Giant Fish"	1:05
14.	"Surfing"	3:04
15.	"The Roc"	2:00
16.	"Heroics"	2:11
17.	"Rescue!"	2:18
18.	"Is It the Shore or the Sea?"	3:28
19.	"Tartarus"	10:12
20.	"Marina's Love / Proteus' Execution"	2:02
21.	"Sinbad Returns and Eris Pays Up"	7:45
22.	"Into the Sunset / End Credits"	2:22
Total length:		1:04:30

== Personnel ==
Credits adapted from liner notes:

- Music composer and conductor – Harry Gregson-Williams
- Musical arrangements – Stephen Barton
- Compiler – Slamm Andrews
- Assistant engineer – Greg Silk, Toby Chu
- Producer – Meri Gavin
- Orchestra leader – Gavyn Wright
- Choir – Metro Voices
- Contractor – Isobel Griffiths
- Recording and mixing – Alan Meyerson
- Mastering – Dave Donnelly
- Music editor – Richard Whitfield
- Music coordinator – Cindi Smith

== Accolades ==
Year	Award	Category	Recipient(s)	Result	Ref.
2003	Annie Awards	Outstanding Music in an Animated Feature Production	Harry Gregson-Williams	Nominated	
