= X-Men: First Class (soundtrack) =

X-Men: First Class (Original Motion Picture Soundtrack)

Film score by Henry Jackman
- Released: June 6, 2011 (digital); July 4, 2011 (physical)
- Recorded: 2011
- Genre: Film score
- Length: 1:00:14
- Labels: Sony Classical; Fox Music
- Producer: Henry Jackman

Henry Jackman chronology
Gulliver's Travels (2010)	X-Men: First Class (2011)	Winnie the Pooh (2011)

X-Men: First Class (Original Motion Picture Soundtrack) is the soundtrack album to the 2011 film X-Men: First Class. The film, directed by Matthew Vaughn, is based on the X-Men characters appearing in Marvel Comics, and is the fourth mainline installment in the X-Men film series and the fifth installment overall. Henry Jackman, who had worked with Vaughn in Kick-Ass (2010) composed the score, becoming the fourth composer to score for the series. (Note: Michael Kamen, John Ottman, John Powell and Harry Gregson-Williams wrote music for the previous X-Men instalments.) The score consisted of pop and rock infused music, which is reminiscent of John Barry's themes from the 1960s.

The soundtrack was digitally released by Sony Classical and Fox Music on June 6, 2011, by CD on July 4, and a vinyl edition which was exclusively released on September 6, 2012. The score received positive response from critics praising Jackman's composition, instrumentation, musical influences and the usage of vintage pop tracks in the film. In March 2022, Reservoir Media acquired the music catalog rights of Jackman's discography, including First Class.

== Development ==
The score he produced for the film consisted of non-virtuosic orchestra, that drives minimal on ostinators. He did not add too much of peiriod-ic music set in the 1960s, as Vaughn was specific on what kind of music he want to use. He wanted the music to be more important than the relevant time period as "the film's issues are universal, whether they're about the need for revenge, or the desire to accept one's self". Jackman described their taste of music, as though he liked orchestrally driven, harmonically complex music produced by John Williams or Alan Silvestri, Vaughn did not want that, and he wanted a "cool, contemporary, brave and simplistic music".

To prepare for the scoring, he experimented with orchestral music, resembling to Silvestri's score for Van Helsing (2004). Though, Vaughn liked it, he did not wanted the score to be orchestral. Following the James Bond influences on First Class, he then drew inspiration from John Barry's work in the said series, which he described it as "extremely posh pop music". Vaughn said that "when Matthew was talking about John Barry, it was about his simplicity and effectiveness in finding something that works and repeating it and building it more on a rock principle", later Jackman then used to bring non-orchestral sounds, as "once he produce that kind of a score, not everything can be played by the orchestra".

Jackman started his work with a "Superman-style theme", featured in the final parts of the film that highlighted a "comedic rub of a guy who describes himself as looking like he'd dressed up in a condom". Vaughn thought it was too "successful and triumphant" for a disjointed and up-and-coming team. Therefore, he reworked a 'stretched' half-time version of the theme into the remainder of the film. The themes for Magneto and Shaw have similarities to reflect their "perverted father-son" relationship, with even a seamless transition during the scene where Shaw is killed to represent Lensherr's full transformation into Magneto. The track "Rage and Serenity" is reused in Kingsman: The Golden Circle (2017), also directed by Vaughn.

In a roundtable interview with multiple news outlets, Vaughn responded to a question about choosing "Love Love" by the British band Take That for the end-credits theme, explaining, "I bumped into lead singer Gary Barlow in Los Angeles, and we were just talking, and I said, 'Do you want to come and see a rough cut of it?' And they came, and they wrote the song, and I listened to it, and I said, 'I think it'll be a hit', and if we can do a video which gets girls more interested ... we might get them to come and watch it. So it's pure commerce, to be blunt, and I want women to see this film." An instrumental of the song "Run (I'm a Natural Disaster)" by Gnarls Barkley is used in the 'mutant recruitment' scene.

== Track listing ==
All music is composed by Henry Jackman, except where noted

Track listing
No.	Title	Writer(s)	Length
1.	"First Class"		3:20
2.	"Pain and Anger"		2:58
3.	"Would You Date Me?"		1:44
4.	"Not That Sort of Bank"	Jackman; Christopher Willis	3:27
5.	"Frankenstein's Monster"		3:03
6.	"What Am I Thinking"	Jackman; Willis	2:10
7.	"Cerebro"		2:23
8.	"Mobilise for Russia"	Jackman; Dominic Lewis	1:18
9.	"Rise Up to Rule"	Jackman; Matthew Margeson; Willis	5:56
10.	"Cold War"		3:20
11.	"X-Training"		4:27
12.	"Rage and Serenity"		2:06
13.	"To Beast or Not to Beast"	Jackman; Lewis; Willis	4:47
14.	"True Colors"		1:51
15.	"Let Battle Commence"	Jackman; Lewis; Margeson	4:45
16.	"Sub Lift"		2:19
17.	"Coup D'état"	Jackman; Willis	2:15
18.	"Mutant and Proud"		3:28
19.	"X-Men"		2:59
20.	"Magneto"	Jackman; Margeson	1:53
Total length:			60:14

== Reception ==
James Christopher Monger of Allmusic compared the score to Daft Punk's work in Tron: Legacy (2010) and wrote "dutifully applies his significant programming and production skills on the punishing "Magneto" theme, and the inclusion of tasteful electric guitars into some of the more orchestral sections brings to mind Hans Zimmer's Inception score." Zanobard Reviews stated "Henry Jackman's score to X-Men: First Class is a great score, and its strength absolutely lies in its themes. The main one is epic, heroic, memorable and in my mind the best theme that the X-Men movie franchise has had so far. Magneto's is also particularly good, though I do find it a bit odd that he has a fantastically villainous motif and yet the main villain for the film basically has nothing, aside from some near-generic and evil-sounding music. Along similar lines – being as superb as it is, the main theme massively outclasses everything else (besides Magneto's theme) on the album, which makes the moments where it doesn't appear seem rather dull in comparison, particularly in the action tracks."

Filmtracks.com wrote "Jackman doesn't stray too far from the dumb, conventional sound of the soundtracks for these kinds of films, especially when the electric guitar is fully unleashed, and nothing in this score will compete with John Powell's superior entry in the franchise. But the composer at least takes steps to try to transcend the stereotypes associated with such music." Jonathan Weilbaecher of The Flickast wrote "The score for X-Men: First Class is a solid and often rousing musical experience. One that stands shoulder to shoulder with most super-hero scores of the past decade. It might lack the bombast of Spider-Man or the sheer scope of X-Men 3, but it packs a serious punch and excels in all the right places."

== Charts ==
Chart (2011)	Peak position
UK Soundtrack Albums (OCC)	28
US Billboard 200	192
US Soundtrack Albums (Billboard)	18

== Personnel ==
Credits adapted from CD liner notes

Production

- Composer – Henry Jackman
- Producer – Al Clay, Henry Jackman
- Additional music – Chris Willis, Dominic Lewis, Matthew Margeson
- Recording – Frank Wolf, Erik Swanson, Slamm Andrews
- Additional recording – Daniel Kresco
- Recordist – Tim Lauber
- Mixing – Al Clay, Jeff Biggers
- Mixing assistance – Johnny Traunwieser, Katia Lewin, Lori Castro
- Score editing – John Finklea
- Editing assistance – Jack Dolman
- Supervising editor – Daniel Pinder
- Music supervisor – Danielle Diego
- Music production supervisor – Rebecca Morellato
- Music production services – Steve Kofsky
- Technical assistance – Danny Stimac, Ben Robinson, Jason Soudah, Victor Chaga

Instrumentation

- Bass – Bruce Morgenthaler, David Parmeter, Edward Meares, Michael Valerio, Nico Carmine Abondolo, Oscar Hidalgo, Susan Ranney, Daniel Pinder
- Bassoon – Kenneth Munday, Rose Corrigan
- Cello – Andrew Shulman, Erika Duke-Kirkpatrick, George Kim Scholes, Giovanna Clayton, Kevan Torfeh, Paul Cohen, Paula Hochhalter, Steve Erdody, Timothy Landauer, Trevor Handy
- Clarinet – Ralph Williams, Stuart Clark
- Drums – Al Clay
- Flute – Geraldine Rotella, Heather Clark
- French horn – Daniel Kelley, David Everson, James Thatcher, Jenny Kim, Mark L. Adams, Steven Becknell
- Guitar – Corky James, George Doering
- Harp – Katie Kirkpatrick
- Oboe – David Weiss
- Piano – Randy Kerber, Henry Jackman, Jack Dolman
- Saxophone – Greg Huckins
- Singing bowls – Joanne Karl
- Trombone – Alexander Iles, William Reichenbach, Charles Loper, Steven Holtman
- Trumpet – Barry Perkins, Jon Lewis, Malcolm McNab, Rick Baptist
- Tuba – Doug Tornquist
- Viola – Alma Fernandez, Andrew Duckles, Brian Dembow, Carolyn Riley, Darrin McCann, David Walther, Keith Greene, Laura Pearson, Luke Maurer, Marlow Fisher, Robert Brophy, Roland Kato, Shawn Mann
- Violin – Alan Grunfeld, Alyssa Park, Amy Hershberger, Ana Landauer, Belinda Broughton, Bruce Dukov, Darius Campo, Dimitrie Leivici, Elizabeth Hedman, Eun-Mee Ahn, Helen Nightengale, Jacqueline Brand, Jay Rosen, Jeanne Skrocki, Jessica E. Guideri, Josefina Vergara, Julie Ann Gigante, Katia Popov, Lisa Sutton, Marc Sazer, Natalie Leggett, Neil Samples, Nina Evtuhov, Phillip Levy, Radu Pieptea, Rafael Rishik, Roberto Cani, Roger Wilkie, Sara Parkins, Sarah Thornblade, Searmi Park, Serena McKinney, Songa Lee, Tamara Hatwan, Tereza Stanislav, Yelena Yegoryan

Orchestra

- Orchestrator – John Ashton Thomas, Stephen Coleman, Noah Sorota
- Orchestra conductor – Nick Glennie-Smith
- Choir contractor – Edie Lehmann-Boddicker
- Concertmaster – Bruce Dukov
- Stage engineer – Denis St. Amand
- Stage manager – Greg Dennen, Tom Steel

Management

- Score contractor – DeCrescent
- Copyist – Joann Kane Music Service
- Business affairs – Tom Cavanaugh
- Executive in charge of music – Robert Kraft
- Executive producer – Robert Kraft
- Technical engineer – Alex Belcher
