= Ayla Nereo =

American musician

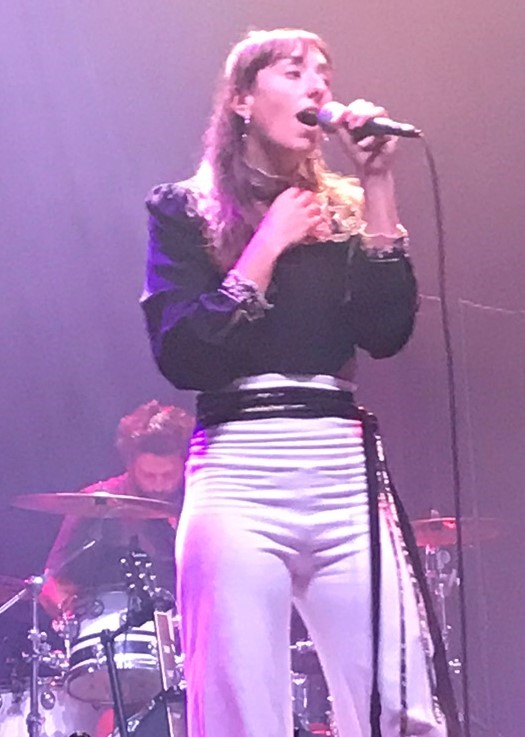
- Nereo in concert at the Lincoln Theatre in Washington, DC in 2019

Background information
- Genres: Folk, electronic
- Occupation: Singer-songwriter
- Instruments: Vocals, guitar, harp
- Years active: 2006-present
- Label: Jumpsuit Records
- Member of: Wildlight, Starling Arrow
- Website: aylanereo.com

Ayla Nereo is an American musician known for her solo work and her work with the groups Wildlight and Starling Arrow.

== Early childhood and education ==
Ayla Nereo grew up in Sonoma County, California. She was home-schooled by her parents until high school and was "raised to appreciate and respect the earth." Some of the music that she grew up listening to includes ABBA, Cat Stevens, Bob Dylan, and classical and traditional Celtic music.

Nereo studied psychology at college, and her artistic interests were dance and film-making.

== Career ==
Nereo began to write and perform music around 2005. Initially afraid to sing for people, she gradually overcame her fears, with the encouragement of her friends. She describes her songwriting process as one of "channelling" songs. In addition to her solo work, Nereo has released music with her brother as the duo Beatbeat Whisper, with dance music DJ The Polish Ambassador, under the name Wildlight, and a cappella group Starling Arrow.

Reviewer Sterling Martin has called Nereo's music "breath-taking" as well as "expansive and intriguing." Another reviewer, Maddy Crandall, referred to her music as "soul music" with "conscious lyrics," pointing to the environmental and progressive values in her music.

Nereo often plays at large music festivals, and has toured with bands including Rising Appalachia, Trevor Hall, and Nahko and Medicine for the People.

== Personal life ==
Nereo lives in Nevada City, California and has a child with partner, Isaac Williams.

== Discography ==
=== Solo albums ===
- Play Me A Time (2006)
- Floating Felt (2009)
- BeHeld (2012)
- Hollow Bone (2014)
- Hollow Bone REMIXES (2015)
- The Code of the Flowers (2016)
- By the Light of the Dark Moon (2019)
- Sovereign Kin (2023)

=== With duo Wildlight ===
- Hers Was As Thunder (2013)
- Hers Was As Thunder (Remixes) (2014)
- The Tide (2015)
- The Tide (Acoustic) (2016)
- The Tide Remixes (2016)

=== With Starling Arrow ===
- Cradle (2023)
