= Winnie the Pooh (soundtrack) =

Soundtrack album by various artists
- Released: July 12, 2011
- Recorded: 2010–2011
- Genre: Film soundtrack
- Length: 46:42
- Label: Walt Disney Records
- Producers: Kristen Anderson-Lopez; Robert Lopez; Henry Jackman

Henry Jackman chronology
X-Men: First Class (2011)	Winnie the Pooh (2011)	Puss in Boots (2011)

Winnie the Pooh is the soundtrack album to the 2011 film of the same name, based on the eponymous novel created by A. A. Milne and E. H. Shepard, and directed by Stephen J. Anderson and Don Hall, the latter in his feature directorial debut. Henry Jackman composed the film score with additional music by Christopher Willis. The original songs were written by Kristen Anderson-Lopez and Robert Lopez. The soundtrack was released by Walt Disney Records on July 12, 2011.

== Development ==
Hoping to find the right songwriters for their film, Anderson and Hall sent visuals to five songwriting teams. The duo liked the demos returned by Robert Lopez and Kristen Anderson-Lopez, who had previously worked with executive producer Lasseter and Disney Records' executive Chris Montan on the theme park musical version of Finding Nemo.

The first song which the songwriting candidates were asked to write was the one which became "Everything Is Honey", in which Pooh undergoes a wild hallucination in his desperate hunger for honey. The Lopezes' inspiration for writing their successful demo was their desperate lack of sleep at the time because of the restlessness of their then-newborn younger daughter, Annie. The Lopezes wrote seven songs for the film, including "The Tummy Song", "A Very Important Thing to Do", "Everything Is Honey", "The Winner Song", "The Backson Song", "Pooh's Finale", and "It's Gonna Be Great". "The Backson Song" was also inspired, again, by the Lopezes' ongoing issues with their younger daughter's difficulty with sleeping through the night, as well as the fact that Disney's request for the song came in while they were on "the vacation from hell" on Fire Island (in Anderson-Lopez's words) and they had to borrow a piano at a local church to compose it. In the song, Kanga (voiced by Anderson-Lopez herself) mentions that one thing that Backsons do is "wake up babies at one and three."

Zooey Deschanel performed three songs for the film, including a take on the Winnie the Pooh theme song, "A Very Important Thing to Do" and an original end-credit song "So Long", which was written by Deschanel and performed with She & Him bandmate M. Ward. Although Winnie the Pooh did not do as well as hoped because it opened against the last film of the Harry Potter series, it was while working on the film that Disney executives started to really notice the Lopezes' "instinct for storytelling with music." In turn, they did not have to audition for their next Disney project; instead, Disney pitched Frozen to them, whose soundtrack received positive response.

Henry Jackman composed the film score with additional music provided by Christopher Willis. Jackman did not incorporate the musical works of Buddy Baker's compositions from The Many Adventures of Winnie the Pooh (1977), but changed the method of composition, disregarding the use of electronic samplers and relied on with orchestration and harmony, to make the music "delightful", "innocent" and "charming". The orchestral section consisted of a string quartet, with instruments such as double bass, cello, viola and violin were used in scoring for the film. Jackman stated "I think I just responded to the picture and spent two or three days finding that Pooh theme that had just enough melodic naivety to feel like Winnie the Pooh, just enough use of harmony so that, as the score develops, you know that you can sort of blossom into the appropriate material for the score." He did not collaborate with Lopez and Deschanel, for writing the songs, as they were mostly standalone tracks. In the trailer, the song "Somewhere Only We Know" by English alternative rock band Keane was used instead of the music written by Jackman. However, "Somewhere Only We Know" is not included on the soundtrack.

== Track listing ==
No.	Title	Writer(s)	Artist(s)	Length
1.	"Winnie the Pooh"	Robert B. Sherman, Richard M. Sherman	Zooey Deschanel & M. Ward	2:32
2.	"The Tummy Song"	Robert Lopez, Kristen Anderson-Lopez	Jim Cummings & Robert Lopez	1:07
3.	"A Very Important Thing to Do"	Robert Lopez, Kristen Anderson-Lopez	Zooey Deschanel	0:47
4.	"The Backson Song"	Robert Lopez, Kristen Anderson-Lopez	Craig Ferguson, Cast - Winnie the Pooh	2:55
5.	"It's Gonna Be Great"	Robert Lopez, Kristen Anderson-Lopez	Bud Luckey & Jim Cummings	2:05
6.	"Everything Is Honey"	Robert Lopez, Kristen Anderson-Lopez	Jim Cummings, Zooey Deschanel, Kristen Anderson-Lopez & Robert Lopez	2:00
7.	"Pooh's Finale"	Robert Lopez, Kristen Anderson-Lopez	Robert Lopez, Zooey Deschanel, & Cast - Winnie the Pooh	1:05
8.	"So Long"	Zooey Deschanel	Zooey Deschanel & M. Ward	3:28
9.	"Main Title Sequence / Winnie the Pooh"	Robert B. Sherman, Richard M. Sherman	Zooey Deschanel & M. Ward	2:24
10.	"Pooh Greets the Day"	Henry Jackman	Henry Jackman	2:46
11.	"Get You Tiggerized!"	Henry Jackman, Christopher Willis	Henry Jackman	2:08
12.	"Woods and Words / Backson Tracks"	Henry Jackman, Christopher Willis	Henry Jackman	3:41
13.	"Eeyore Needs His Tail / The Winner Song"	Henry Jackman / Robert Lopez, Kristen Anderson-Lopez	Cast - Winnie the Pooh	2:08
14.	"Picnic and Beehive Chase"	Henry Jackman	Henry Jackman	2:26
15.	"Hundred Acre Spy Game"	Henry Jackman	Henry Jackman	3:34
16.	"Stuck in the Pit/Balloon Chase"	Henry Jackman	Henry Jackman	4:04
17.	"A Honey Happy Ending"	Henry Jackman	Henry Jackman	2:44
18.	"Winnie the Pooh Suite"	Henry Jackman, Christopher Willis	Henry Jackman	4:38
Total length:				48:03

== Charts ==
Chart (2009)	Position
US Billboard 200	98
US Soundtrack Albums (Billboard)	10

== Awards and nominations ==
The song "So Long" was nominated for Grammy Award for Best Song Written for Visual Media at the 2012 ceremony, and the film's soundtrack received an Annie Award for Outstanding Achievement for Music in a Feature Production. The film's acclaimed track "The Backson Song", along with "So Long", were shortlisted for the nominations for Academy Award for Best Original Song, and Henry Jackman for the Best Original Score category list. However, none of them received the nominations.
