= Trevor Hall (musician) =

American musician

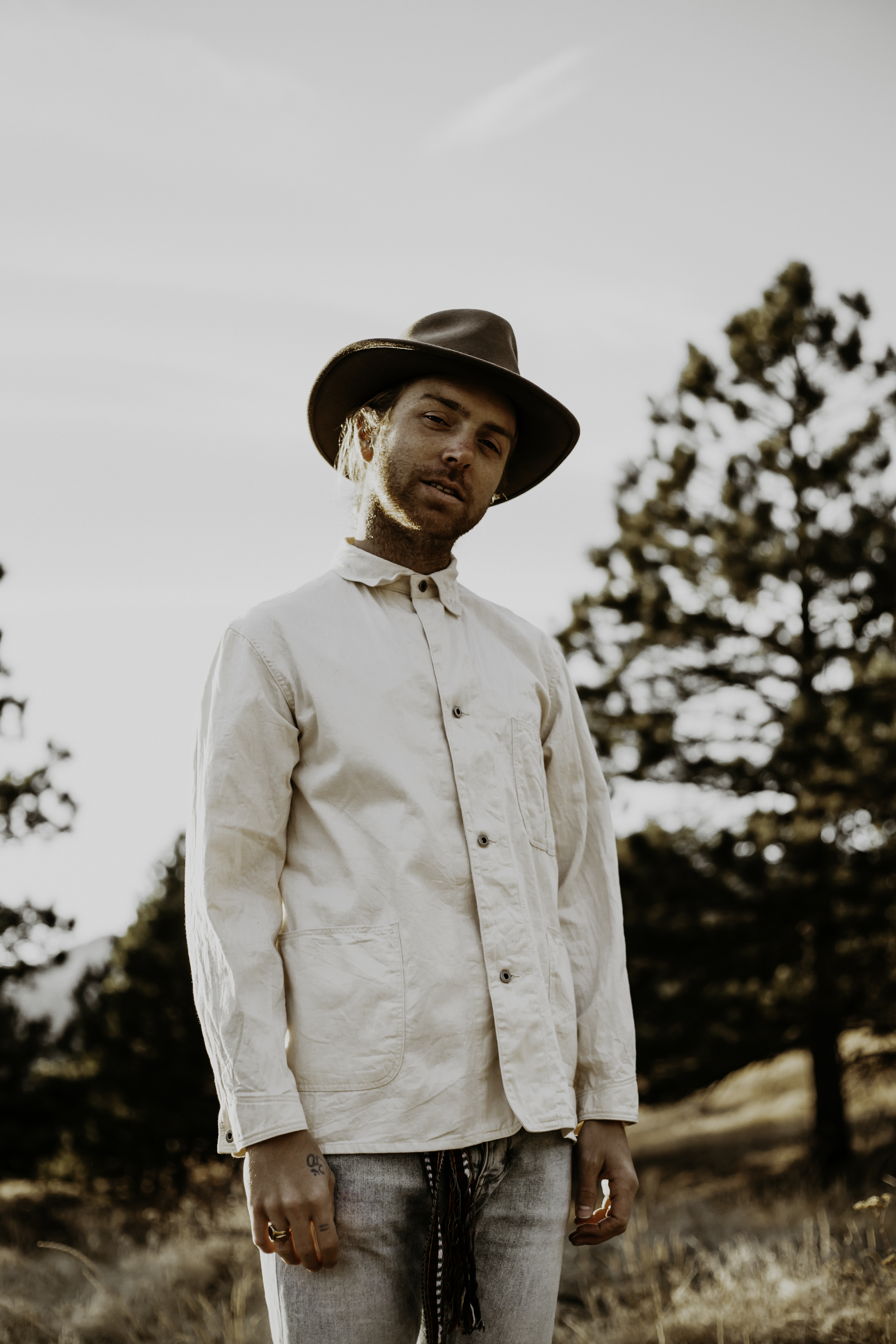

Background information
- Born: November 28, 1986 (age 39); Greenwich, Connecticut, United States
- Origin: Idyllwild, California, United States
- Genres: Alternative/Indie
- Occupations: Singer, musician
- Instruments: Vocals, guitar
- Years active: 2004–present
- Labels: Vanguard Records; Geffen Records; White Balloon
- Website: www.trevorhallmusic.com

Trevor Hall (born November 28, 1986) is an American singer-songwriter and guitarist. His music is a fusion of roots, folk, and reggae. Many of Hall's themes revolve around spirituality and life exploration.

== Early life and education ==
Hall was born in Greenwich, Connecticut, and grew up in Hilton Head Island, South Carolina. He grew up surrounded by music due in part to his father who was a drummer and musician. After dabbling with multiple instruments including trombone and bass, he decided to learn guitar in hopes of becoming a singer-songwriter one day. At age 16 he recorded his first album.

Shortly after, Hall left South Carolina for California where he studied classical guitar at musical boarding high school Idyllwild Arts Academy in the San Jacinto Mountains. During his time, he was introduced to yoga and meditation practices and spirituality, which made a major impact on him and has since influenced his life and music.

Hall's friend Sam introduced him to the teachings of Neem Karoli Baba and Ram Dass, and the devotional music of Krishna Das. Hall has stated that one of the most important weekends of his life was when he went to the Laguna Beach Kali Temple for a weekend while at Idyllwild. At the temple, he learned about the Hindu goddess Kali and was happily surprised to find out people worship God as a woman.

During his senior year at Idyllwild Arts Academy, Hall was signed to Geffen Records. Hall graduated from Idyllwild in 2005 and moved to Los Angeles to be near the Kali Temple. On January 1, 2006, Hall converted to Hinduism, receiving a name, mantra, and instruction from his guru, Swami Bhajanananda Saraswati. He has stated that he tries to treat his music as karma yoga, where he wants to create music that will help other people.

== Career ==
=== Kala (2015) ===
His album, Kala, written in Hawaii and recorded in Los Angeles, was released on August 21, 2015. It debuted at No. 2 on the iTunes singer-songwriter chart.

=== The Fruitful Darkness (2018) ===
Released on June 1, 2018, The Fruitful Darkness was Hall's first completely independent release. After working with established labels for the first decade of his career, this project was supported solely by his fans and was the No. 1 music campaign in 2017 on KickStarter. Relix praised the album, saying "The Fruitful Darkness takes stock of Hall's inner world and, as you observe him wade through the abyss, he challenges you to do the same".

=== Red Rocks (2019) ===
Hall headlined the historic Red Rocks Amphitheater on June 16, 2019, playing a packed show with Nahko and Medicine for the People, as well as Ayla Nereo. After the success of the show, Hall later announced on November 19, 2019, that he will be returning to headline the historic Red Rocks Amphitheater on May 1, 2020.

=== In And Through The Body (2020) ===
Released on September 25, 2020, In And Through The Body was another of Hall's independent releases. According to Hall, the album "touches on the timeless human themes of love, struggle, growth and redemption" utilizing a "palette of genres that span from folk, roots-rock, indie, and electronic, all with a consistent wash of authentic far-Eastern influence".

== Reception: interviews and reviews ==
Hall was a guest on Danica Patrick's podcast "Danica Patrick Pretty Intense." Patrick praised Hall's music, saying he "has a lot of heart, a lot of soul. He writes it all himself. He just has a really cool story".

== Personal life ==
Hall is married to photographer Emory Hall. The two met on an ashram in 2010 while in India, where Emory was studying at the time. They live in Boulder, Colorado.

== Discography ==
EPs

- 2006: The Rascals Have Returned (Geffen Records)
- 2015: Unpack Your Memories... (Vanguard Records)

Live albums

- 2005: Trevor Hall Live (Geffen Records)
- 2008: Alive & On the Road (With Chris Steele) (White Balloon)
- 2010: Chasing The Flame - On the Road With Trevor Hall (Vanguard Records)
- 2024: Trevor Hall and the Great In-Between(Live From the Barn)

Studio albums

- 2004: Lace Up Your Shoes (White Balloon)
- 2008: The Elephant's Door (Never released) (Geffen Records)
- 2008: This is Blue (White Ballon)
- 2009: Trevor Hall (Vanguard Records)
- 2011: Everything Everytime Everywhere (Vanguard Records)
- 2014: Chapter of the Forest (Vanguard Records)
- 2015: Kala (Vanguard Records)
- 2017: The Fruitful Darkness (independent release)
- 2020: In and Through the Body
- 2023: Trevor Hall and The Great In-Between

Compilation appearances

- 2007: Shrek the Third: The Motion Picture Soundtrack – "Other Ways"
- 2007: Endless Highway: The Music of The Band – "Life Is a Carnival"
- 2009: StreetEDGE Program: July Titles '09 – "The Lime Tree", "31 Flavors", and "Unity (featuring Matisyahu)"
- 2009: Paste Magazine Sampler Issue 54 – "Unity"
- 2010: Vanguard Records Summer Sampler – "The Lime Tree"
- 2011: Putumayo World Music: Acoustic Café – "World Keeps Turnin'"

With "The Villagers Crew"

- 2010: All Things Material & Spiritual (self-released)

=== Singles ===
Year	Title	Album
2009	"The Lime Tree"	Trevor Hall
2009	"Unity"	Trevor Hall
2010	"Volume"	Trevor Hall
2011	"Brand New Day"	Everything, Everytime, Everywhere
2015	"Back To You"	KALA
2016	"To Zion"	KALA
2018	"What I Know"	The Fruitful Darkness
2018	"Up There"	The Fruitful Darkness
2018	"Moon/Sun"	The Fruitful Darkness
2019	"If I Was a Warrior"	The Fruitful Darkness
2020	"Fire In Your House"	In and Through Your Body
2020	"I Remember You"	In and Through Your Body
2020	"We In a Different Room"	In and Through Your Body
2020	"My God"	In and Through Your Body
2021	"2009"	Non-album single
2022	"2 Oceans" (duet with Marieme)	Non-album single
2023	"All of My Lessons"	Non-album single
