= Trevor Hall (album) =

Studio album by Trevor Hall
- Released: July 18, 2009
- Genres: Indie Rock, acoustic, folk
- Length: 52:15
- Label: Vanguard Records
- Producer: Marshall Altman

Trevor Hall chronology
This Is Blue (2008)	Trevor Hall (2009)	Chasing The Flame - On the Road With Trevor Hall (2010)

Trevor Hall is the sixth album by Trevor Hall (not including his unreleased album The Elephant's Door). The album spawned two singles, "Unity" and "Volume". It is his first major-label release since he was dropped from Geffen Records. The album features two songs that had previously been recorded for his unreleased album The Elephant's Door. "The Lime Tree" and "31 Flavors" were reworked and re-recorded, with "The Lime Tree" featuring additional vocals by Colbie Caillat. The album was produced by Marshall Altman, who also performed on several tracks. After the first week of the album's release, it had debuted at No. 199 on the Billboard 200 album chart, also debuting at No. 7 on the Billboard Heatseeker's chart. Trevor was 22 when the album was released.

The album is dedicated to Sri Baba Neem Karoli Maharajji and Sri Nabani Das Khyepa Baul.

== Track listing ==
No.	Title	Writer(s)	Length
1.	"Internal Heights"	Trevor Hall, Marshall Altman	3:13
2.	"Who You Gonna Turn To"	Trevor Hall	4:14
3.	"Unity"	Trevor Hall	4:33
4.	"The Lime Tree"	Trevor Hall, Sam Markus	3:20
5.	"Volume"	Trevor Hall, Marshall Altman	4:09
6.	"House"	Trevor Hall, Marshall Altman	5:13
7.	"Where's the Love"	Trevor Hall, Marshall Altman	4:00
8.	"Origami Crane"	Trevor Hall, Marshall Altman	4:46
9.	"My Baba (ft. Krishna Das)"	Trevor Hall	3:47
10.	"31 Flavors"	Trevor Hall	4:05
11.	"Sing the song"	Trevor Hall, Marshall Altman	3:38
12.	"Many Roads"	Trevor Hall	3:36
13.	"Unity (ft. Matisyahu) (Bonus Track)"	Trevor Hall, Matisyahu Miller	3:41

== Personnel ==
- Trevor Hall – Acoustic guitar, vocals, melodica on "Origami Crane"
- Sean Hurley – Bass guitar
- John Saglimbeni – Bass guitar
- Izler – Electric guitar
- Michael Chaves – Electric guitar
- Aaron Sterling – Drums, percussion, live drum programming
- Zac Rae – Wurlitzer, clavinet, piano, keys, synthesizer, noises, live drum programming on "Origami Crane", banjo on "My Baba", electric guitar on "Sing the Song"
- Chris Steele – Percussion
- Matisyahu – Vocals on "Unity"
- Colbie Caillat – Vocals on "The Lime Tree"
- Krishna Das – Vocals on "My Baba"
- Becky Gebhardt – Sitar on "Internal Heights"
- Alex Altman – Mini-guitar on "Internal Heights"
- Eric Robinson – Hammond organ on "Unity", wurlitzer on "The Lime Tree", backing vocals on "Volume".
- Marshall Altman – Programming, percussion, backing vocals, toy piano on "Who You Gonna Turn To", wurlitzer on "The Lime Tree" and "Volume", xylophone on "My Baba"

Technical

- Marshall Altman – Producer, arrangement, recording
- Eric Robinson – Mixing, recording
- Brian Gardner – Mastering

Artwork

- Kate Schafer – Cover shot
- David Johnson – Photography
- Carrie Smith – Art direction & design
