= Shrek the Third (soundtrack) =

2007 film soundtrack album

Shrek the Third: Motion Picture Soundtrack

Soundtrack album by various artists
- Released: May 15, 2007
- Genres: Hard rock; rock; pop
- Length: 50:45
- Label: Geffen
- Producers: Ron Fair, Abraham Laboriel, Thom Panunzio, Jack Joseph Puig, Philip White, The Underdogs, Harry Gregson-Williams, will.i.am, Tal Herzberg, Mark Oliver Everett, Jared Gosselin, Mateo Laboriel

Shrek the Third (Motion Picture Soundtrack) is the soundtrack album to the 2007 DreamWorks Animation film Shrek the Third; the third instalment in the Shrek franchise and a sequel to Shrek 2 (2004). It was released through Geffen Records on May 15, 2007.

== Background ==
Like the previous two films, the soundtrack would incorporate licensed songs used in the film. Most of them include contemporary artists such as Paul McCartney and Wings, Ramones, Eels, Led Zeppelin, Fergie and Wolfmother. The cast members also perform few songs as well, with Eddie Murphy and Antonio Banderas covering Sly and the Family Stone's "Thank You (Falettinme Be Mice Elf Agin)".

There is an exclusive song for the Japanese dub, called "Love is the Greatest Thing" by w-inds.

== Track listing ==
No.	Title	Artist	Length
1.	"Royal Pain"	Eels	2:28
2.	"Do You Remember Rock 'n' Roll Radio?"	The Ramones	3:50
3.	"Immigrant Song"	Led Zeppelin	2:25
4.	"Barracuda"	Fergie	4:39
5.	"Live and Let Die"	Paul McCartney & Wings	3:13
6.	"Best Days"	Matt White	3:01
7.	"Joker & the Thief"	Wolfmother	4:41
8.	"Other Ways"	Trevor Hall	3:25
9.	"Cat's in the Cradle"	Harry Chapin	3:46
10.	"Losing Streak"	Eels	2:50
11.	"What I Gotta Do"	Macy Gray	3:09
12.	"Thank You (Falletin Me Be Mice Elf Again)"	Eddie Murphy, Antonio Banderas	4:39
13.	"Final Showdown"	Maya Rudolph, Rupert Everett & Julie Andrews	1:55
14.	"Charming's Plan"	Harry Gregson-Williams	2:49
15.	"Touched By Love" (Australian Bonus Track)	Eran James	3:55
Total length:			50:45

== Reception ==
Professional ratings
Review scores
Source	Rating
AllMusic	3/5 stars
Rolling Stone	3/5 stars

Kevin O'Donnell of Rolling Stone considered it to be a "mostly appealing mixed bag". Heather Phares of AllMusic wrote "Shrek the Third is a fun but slight soundtrack that only die-hard Shrek fans really need." However, Spence D. of IGN said "Shrek The Third Original Motion Picture Soundtrack is one of those non-essential soundtracks that really only a diehard Shrek fan/completist will feel the absolute need to own. Sadly, there just isn't enough strikingly original musical fare included here to make it worth more than a casual listen or two." Rob Mackle of The Guardian wrote "The soundtrack is an odd misfit too, lumping in the great and the awful irrelevantly".

== Commercial performance ==
The soundtrack was not a bigger success than its predecessors, despite performing commercially well and topping the charts worldwide. In the United States, the album sold around 114,000 units.

== Charts ==
Chart (2007)	Peak position
Australian Albums (ARIA)	32
Austrian Albums (Ö3 Austria)	61
Canadian Albums (Billboard)	22
US Billboard 200	34
US Soundtracks (Billboard)	2
