= Shrek 2 (score) =

2004 film soundtrack album

Shrek 2 (Original Motion Picture Score)

Film score by Harry Gregson-Williams
- Released: December 7, 2004
- Genres: Film score; classical
- Length: 40:25
- Label: Varèse Sarabande

Harry Gregson-Williams chronology
Shrek: The Motion Picture Score (2001)	Shrek 2 (Original Motion Picture Score) (2004)	Shrek the Third: The Motion Picture Score (2007)

Shrek 2 (Original Motion Picture Score) is the film score composed by Harry Gregson-Williams to the 2004 DreamWorks Animation film Shrek 2 which is the second instalment in the Shrek franchise and a sequel to Shrek (2001). The score album was released on December 7, 2004, under the Varèse Sarabande label and received a nomination for Annie Award for Outstanding Achievement for Music in a Feature Production.

== Background ==
Shrek composer Harry Gregson-Williams returned to score the sequel, without the involvement of co-composer John Powell as both of them had amicably parted ways to refrain from being pigeonholed and focus more on individual projects. Gregson-Williams added that the score is what binds the film together, which helps in narrating the story. Gregson-Williams borrowed most of the main themes from the first film while also scoring newer themes for specific sequences and new characters.

== Reception ==
Peter Simons of Movie Music UK wrote: "It doesn't really come as surprise that Harry Gregson-Williams is able to produce a stunning score for Shrek without the aid of the original co-composer John Powell, as Gregson-Williams has already proven to be an excellent composer on his own [...] While there was little actually wrong with the original Shrek score, it somehow didn't quite satisfy me – perhaps the cues were a bit too short and too varied to make for a coherent album. This sequel seems a little more focused and also relies on the orchestra a bit more than its predecessor, making it a more rewarding album to listen to overall." Christian Clemmensen of Filmtracks called "Shrek 2 is an improvement over its predecessor".

James Christopher Monger of AllMusic wrote "Choirs, Renaissance-style marches, and big-band numbers co-exist with nary an awkward segue, resulting in a finished product that's undeniably superficial, but as mischievous and likeable as the ogre himself". Thomas Glorieux of Maintitles wrote "[Shrek 2] lacks the highlights of the first score, yet giving us a much smoother listen in the process". Ain't It Cool News-based critic wrote "The score by Harry-Gregson Williams was top notch".

== Track listing ==
All tracks are written by Harry Gregson-Williams.

No.	Title	Length
1.	"Prince Charming"	2:05
2.	"Leaving Home"	1:12
3.	"Far Far Away"	1:44
4.	"Family Dinner"	2:10
5.	"Fiona's Room"	1:01
6.	"We Need to Talk"	1:32
7.	"The Poison Apple"	1:20
8.	"The Factory"	1:40
9.	"By the Ol' Oak"	2:02
10.	"Annoying Talking Animal"	2:56
11.	"The Potion Room"	3:08
12.	"Deep Fried"	2:02
13.	"Not Meant to Be"	2:49
14.	"The Ball"	1:09
15.	"The Prince of Her Dreams"	2:16
16.	"Tonight on "Knights""	0:48
17.	"Magic Tea"	1:50
18.	"The Mission"	1:29
19.	"Muffin Man"	1:10
20.	"Get the Wand"	2:08
21.	"All Is Revealed"	3:16
22.	"Dragon!!"	0:38
Total length:		40:25

- When Shrek's friends break him out of prison, the central motif from Mission: Impossible by Lalo Schifrin is heard as Pinocchio descends on puppet strings as another allusion to the television and film franchise.

== Personnel ==
Credits adapted from liner notes:

- Music composer and producer – Harry Gregson-Williams
- Additional music – James McKee Smith, Stephen Barton
- Engineer – Meri Gavin, Olga Fitzroy, Toby Chu
- Recording – Nick Wollage
- Mixing – Alan Meyerson
- Music editor – Mark Jan Wlodarkiewicz
- Executive producer – Robert Townson
- Musical assistance – Gregg Silk, Jake Jackson
- Music coordinator – Julie Keel, Ken Smith
- Music preparation – Tony Stanton
- Package design – Matthew Joseph Peak
- Music business affairs – Lenny Wohl
- Executive in charge of music – Sunny Park
- Music clearance – Julie Butchko

Orchestra

- Orchestra – London Symphony Orchestra
- Conductor – Harry Gregson-Williams
- Orchestra leader – Gavyn Wright
- Orchestra contractor – Isobel Griffiths

Instrument

- Baritone saxophone – Dave Bishop
- Cello – Jonathan Williams, Paul Kegg
- Clarinet – Nicholas Bucknall
- Double bass – Allen Walley, Steve McManus
- Electric violin – Hugh Marsh
- Flute – Anna Noakes
- French horn – Richard Bissill
- Guitar – Heitor Pereira
- Harp – Skaila Kanga
- Harpsichord – Robert King
- Tenor saxophone – Jamie Talbot
- Trombone – Eric Crees, Peter Davies
- Trumpet – Andy Crowley, Daniel Newell
- Viola – Bruce White, Jake Walker, Rachel Bolt
- Violin – Everton Nelson, Mark Berrow, Tom Pigott-Smith, Warren Zielinski

Choir

- Choir – Metro Voices
- Alto vocals – Heather Cairncross, Sarah Simmonds
- Bass vocals – Andrew Playfoot, Michael Dore, Russell Scott
- Soprano vocals – Morag MacKay, Sarah Eyden
- Tenor vocals – Tom Pearce

== Accolades ==
Award	Category	Name	Result	Ref.
Annie Awards	Music in an Animated Feature Production	Harry Gregson-Williams	Nominated	
BMI Film & TV Awards	BMI Film Music Award	Harry Gregson-Williams	Won	
International Film Music Critics Association	Best Original Score for a Comedy Film	Harry Gregson-Williams	Nominated	
World Soundtrack Awards	Soundtrack Composer of the Year	Harry Gregson-Williams	Nominated	
World Soundtrack Awards	Best Original Soundtrack of the Year	Harry Gregson-Williams	Nominated	
