= Puss in Boots (soundtrack) =

2011 film soundtrack album

Puss in Boots (Music from the Motion Picture)

Film score by Henry Jackman
- Released: October 26, 2011
- Recorded: 2010–2011
- Studio: AIR Studios
- Genres: Classical; Latin pop
- Length: 65:51
- Label: Sony Classical

Henry Jackman chronology
Winnie the Pooh (2011)	Puss in Boots (Music from the Motion Picture) (2011)	Small Fry (2011)

Puss in Boots (Music from the Motion Picture) is the score album to the 2011 film of the same name, released by Sony Classical Records on October 26, 2011. The album featured 22 tracks from the original score composed by Henry Jackman, and two songs performed by the Mexican guitar duo Rodrigo y Gabriela: "Diablo Rojo" and "Hanuman" being included. Lady Gaga's song "Americano" was also featured in the film, but not included in the soundtrack. The music was positively received by critics and fans, and received him a nomination for Annie Award for Music in a Feature Production, but lost to John Williams for his score in The Adventures of Tintin (2011). The score is one of Jackman's film score catalog acquired by Reservoir Media in March 2022.

== Development ==
Jackman discussed with Chris Miller about the music, a year before signing on to the project, as there are certain sequences which are informative about the characters, about the environment and about the music style. Miller wanted Jackman to write cues for several characters, including those for Puss in Boots and Kitty Softpaws, and individual cues for each characters, during the production. On working with Miller, Jackman felt that "He's good to work with because he has very strong ideas and he expresses them, you know, like a director. It's not his job to be musically trained and describe to me the orchestration he's looking for or play me a specific piece of music."

Jackman influenced Spanish and Mexican music for writing the Puss in Boots theme, inspired by Spanish composer Manuel de Falla, as he wanted it to match it with the characteristics of the protagonist. Hence, he used several instruments such as guitar, castagnette, accordion and Latin percussion to bring that theme. The sounds created from bells and whistles inspired from Ennio Morricone's The Good, the Bad and the Ugly (1966). As the film goes into a "fairytale" sequence, the music deviates from the traditional to fantasy music, referencing the music of the Harry Potter films, creating a new symphonic language. He said, "the characters and the nature of the story created a really wide and enjoyable palette of musical textures and orchestrations that you could legitimally pursuit and it's not self indulgent."

In addition to the folk instrumentation, Jackman added a symphonic orchestra to deliver "grandeur and emotion" as well as the "history in concert music of Spanish influence appearing in a symphonic context". The orchestral sound was influenced from the work of Claude Debussy and Maurice Ravel; in addition, he also inspired Duke Ellington's works and George Gershwin's composition for An American in Paris (1951) for jazz music, and English folk music from the likes of Ralph Vaughan Williams and Percy Grainger, which are driven by symphony orchestra. To balance the musical tone, he also roped several soloists as "instead of all the cues in the film being grand and symphonic all the time, which would be feel too general, the use of solo instruments can really bring the melodies forward and it makes it closer and more intimate and more individual". For the flamenco part, he roped the guitarist duo Rodrigo y Gabriela to create a unique musical style, in addition to contributing for two songs.

== Track listing ==
No.	Title	Length
1.	"A Bad Kitty"	2:04
2.	"One Leche"	2:01
3.	"Jack and Jill"	0:22
4.	"Holy Frijoles"	1:14
5.	"Chasing Tail"	1:09
6.	"Diablo Rojo" (Rodrigo Y Gabriela)	4:53
7.	"Humpty Dumpty & Kitty Softpaws"	2:42
8.	"The Orphanage"	4:29
9.	"Honor and Justice"	1:44
10.	"That Fateful Night"	2:35
11.	"The Wagon Chase"	2:58
12.	"Team Effort"	0:57
13.	"Planting the Beans"	2:09
14.	"The Magic Beanstalk"	1:17
15.	"Castle in the Clouds"	1:57
16.	"Golden Goose of Legend"	6:38
17.	"Hanuman" (Rodrigo Y Gabriela)	3:39
18.	"Confronting the Past"	1:37
19.	"I Was Always There"	4:06
20.	"Kitty-Cat Break-Out"	1:35
21.	"The Great Terror"	7:56
22.	"Farewell to San Ricardo"	1:32
23.	"The Puss Suite"	3:09
24.	"The Giant's Castle"	3:08
Total length:		65:51

== Reception ==
Professional ratings
Review scores
Source	Rating
Allmusic	3.5/5 stars

William Ruhlmann of AllMusic wrote "Jackman understands that in films with overtly cartoonish aspects he is allowed to use overstated and exaggerated effects, bringing them right to the edge of parody without quite going over [...] It's no wonder Jackman cites Debussy as an influence, since he makes use of an impressionistic impulse in which tonal colors can change suddenly with the present sound bearing little relation to what came before or what will come next. It can work seamlessly in the movies; on disc it's a little frenetic, or, put another way, consistently surprising." Jonathan Broxton wrote "The orchestral inventiveness, the fantastic use of the guitars and other Spanish specialty instruments, the outstanding Jack and the Beanstalk theme, and the show-stopping contributions of Rodrigo y Gabriela combine to make Puss in Boots one of the most unexpectedly engaging and entertaining score of the year, and confirms my earlier thought that Henry Jackman is poised to follow in the footsteps of Harry Gregson-Williams and John Powell as possibly the most talented composer to emerge from Remote Control for many years."

Filmtracks.com wrote "Jackman has provided the film with what it basically called for, and most of the distracting references are the kinds of things that reveal themselves far more outside of context. The Rodrigo y Gabriela guitar contributions are reportedly newly arranged re-recordings of their previous work, and if they perform in the original score, they don't have a notable impact. Still, their appearance here is better suited than in Pirates of the Caribbean: On Stranger Tides earlier in the same year. The overall package of Puss in Boots will likely become a guilty pleasure for many listeners, but for Powell, Morricone, and especially Horner collectors, it may send you seeking the original sources of inspiration. Been there, done that." James Southall of Movie Wave wrote "The bulk of it is actually in the traditional Dreamworks Animation music style (Gregson-Williams, Powell et al) but with a Latin twist, thanks to all the guitars and trumpets. It's absolutely chock-full of terrific action music, which is riotously good fun and enhanced no end by Rodrigo and Gabriela's guitar performances (there are also a couple of tracks from one of their earlier albums on the album). There are a few themes here – not especially memorable, but this is designed to be fairly disposable popcorn fun and it's that to the nth degree. This is one of the most unoriginal scores of the year – but one of the most enjoyable score albums and unquestionably Jackman's most impressive to date."

== Complete score ==
On December 5, 2011, Paramount and DreamWorks released the complete score as part of their "For Your Consideration" (FYC) campaign. The album features the full score as heard in the film, with the two songs by Rodrigo Y Gabriela excluded from the track listing.

No.	Title	Length
1.	"Puss-Style DWA Logo"	0:36
2.	"Bad Kitty"	2:33
3.	"Look What The Cat Dragged In"	0:58
4.	"Beans Of Legend"	2:10
5.	"Boar-Driven Bean Vessel"	1:19
6.	"Bandoneon On The Run, Part 1"	0:12
7.	"Bandoneon On The Run, Part 2"	0:18
8.	"Holy Frijoles"	1:17
9.	"Rooftop Chase"	1:32
10.	"Stand Off Sting"	0:15
11.	"Dance Fight Preamble"	0:32
12.	"Mad As Hell"	0:36
13.	"Swordfight"	0:39
14.	"Humpty Dumpty & Kitty Softpaws"	2:16
15.	"You Work For The Egg"	1:27
16.	"The Orphanage/Inter-Species Bonding"	4:56
17.	"The Bean Trust"	1:38
18.	"Bull Unleashed"	1:21
19.	"Honour And Justice"	1:05
20.	"Betrayal and Disappointment"	2:45
21.	"Second Chance"	1:04
22.	"Prelude To A Heist"	1:12
23.	"Bean Theft"	1:06
24.	"The Wag Wags"	3:10
25.	"Heist Aftermath"	1:04
26.	"Kitty Life Story/Planting Beans"	2:17
27.	"Beanstalk Ascension"	1:21
28.	"High-Pitched Cloud Frolic"	2:02
29.	"Castle Skulkington"	1:45
30.	"Egg Meadow"	2:29
31.	"Egg Meadow Escape - The Goose Is Coming"	2:31
32.	"Full-On Goose Victory"	0:34
33.	"Rock-A-Bye Baby"	0:17
34.	"Some Poaching To Do"	0:40
35.	"Camp Fire Dance Percussion"	1:39
36.	"Brothers Again"	1:25
37.	"Desert Ride"	1:18
38.	"I Was Always There"	2:13
39.	"Planned Injustice"	1:36
40.	"Homicidal Goose"	0:55
41.	"Sprung From Jail"	1:23
42.	"Hoosegow Escape"	0:52
43.	"Bell Tower Reconciliation, Part 1"	1:46
44.	"The Great Terror"	4:27
45.	"Going Home"	2:21
46.	"An Outlaw"	1:38
47.	"Puss In Boots End Titles"	0:22
48.	"Puss In Boots End Credits"	3:13
49.	"The Giant's Castle"	3:14
