= Shrek (score) =

2001 film soundtrack album

Shrek (Original Motion Picture Score)

Film score by Harry Gregson-Williams and John Powell
- Released: December 4, 2001
- Genre: Film score
- Length: 44:16
- Label: Varèse Sarabande

Harry Gregson-Williams and John Powell chronology
Shrek (Original Motion Picture Score) (2001)	Shrek 2: The Motion Picture Score (2004)

Shrek (Original Motion Picture Score) is the film score composed by Harry Gregson-Williams and John Powell to the 2001 DreamWorks Animation film Shrek directed by Andrew Adamson and Vicky Jenson. The film score was released through Varèse Sarabande on December 4, 2001, featuring 27 tracks from their score. Shrek was also their third and final collaboration between Gregson-Williams and Powell, as they decided to work on individual projects; the former would reprise his roles for the forthcoming instalments.

The score received a BAFTA Award for Best Film Music and Saturn Award for Best Score, which was lost to Craig Armstrong for Moulin Rouge! and John Williams for A.I. Artificial Intelligence, but won Annie Award for Outstanding Achievement for Music in a Feature Production and Ivor Novello Award for Best Original Film Score.

== Development ==
Shrek is the third film where both Gregson-Williams and Powell worked together, following DreamWorks' Antz (1998) and Chicken Run (2000). Like their previous collaborations, they wrote several themes and brainstormed ideas collaboratively and send ideas back-and-forth to provide an interactive and collaborative effort. Firstly, they tried to develop a structure and after building them, they would take those ideas and apply it to different sections of the film. Gregson-Williams would score the opening sequence while Powell would work on the action sequences and specific themes that demanded on huge orchestral cues. While Gregson-Williams wrote the "fairy tale" theme, Powell's "Ride of the Dragon" was considered to be his favorite, which had incorporated his themes. Gavin Greenaway would conduct and orchestrate the score after doing the same for Antz and Chicken Run. This was also their last film they had collaborated for, as they decided to work individually on other projects to avoid being pigeonholed. Gregson-Williams would compose the later instalments in the Shrek franchise.

== Reception ==
Thomas Glorieux of Maintitles wrote "Shrek is still very good. But there are some moments that simply don't connect. First of all it is the various short length of several tracks that keeps destroying the magic, and secondly it are the various short songs. While funny in context, they don't really mingle well with the composed score, at least not to create this amazing listening experience." Christian Clemmensen of Filmtracks wrote "beyond all the hype and waiting for an album release of Shrek (which is half a year late, no less), the music hasn't translated as well from film to album as was hoped. What we're left with is a mish-mash of short rhythms, thematic rip-offs, and a few nearly unlistenable comedy tracks."

== Track listing ==
All tracks are written by Harry Gregson-Williams and John Powell.

No.	Title	Length
1.	"Fairytale"	1:26
2.	"Ogre Hunters / Fairytale Deathcamp"	1:35
3.	"Donkey Meets Shrek"	2:37
4.	"Eating Alone"	1:17
5.	"Uninvited Guests"	2:09
6.	"March of Farquaad"	0:38
7.	"The Perfect King"	1:17
8.	"Welcome to Duloc"	0:34
9.	"Tournament Speech"	0:52
10.	"What Kind of Quest?"	2:22
11.	"Dragon! / Fiona Awakens"	2:06
12.	"One of a Kind Knight"	1:19
13.	"Saving Donkey's Ass"	0:43
14.	"Escape from the Dragon"	1:58
15.	"Helmet Hair"	2:08
16.	"Delivery Boy Shrek / Making Camp"	0:47
17.	"Friends Journey to Duloc"	2:42
18.	"Starry Night"	0:58
19.	"Singing Princess"	1:35
20.	"Better Out Than In / Sunflower / I'll Tell Him"	2:10
21.	"Merry Men"	0:43
22.	"Fiona Kicks Ass"	0:28
23.	"Fiona's Secret"	3:02
24.	"Why Wait to Be Wed / You Thought Wrong"	1:58
25.	"Ride the Dragon"	1:36
26.	"I Object"	1:51
27.	"Transformation / The End"	3:26
Total length:		44:16

== Personnel ==
Credits adapted from liner notes:

- Music composer and producer – Harry Gregson-Williams, John Powell
- Additional music – James McKee Smith
- Recording – Nick Wollage, Slamm Andrews
- Mixing – Alan Meyerson, Slamm Andrews
- Mastering – Patricia Sullivan-Fourstar
- Music editor – Brian Richards
- Executive producer – Robert Townson
- Musical assistance – Alastair King, Dave Hecox, Joel Richard, Julie Imboden, Ken Smith, Toby Chu
- Music supervisor – Marylata E. Jacob
- Music preparation – Tony Stanton
- Package design – Matthew Joseph Peak
- Music clearance – Julie Butchko
- Music business affairs – Lenny Wohl

Orchestra

- Orchestration – Bruce L. Fowler, Elizabeth Finch, John Bell, John Coleman, Ladd McIntosh, Walter Fowler, Yvonne S. Moriarty
- Orchestra conductor – Gavin Greenaway, Harry Gregson-Williams
- Orchestra contractor – Isobel Griffiths
- Orchestra leader – Gavyn Wright

Instruments

- Cello – Martin Tillman
- Clarinet – Anthony Pike, Dave Bishop, Nicholas Bucknall
- Double bass – Steve McManus
- Flute – Andrew Findon, Anna Noakes
- French horn – Richard Bissill
- Guitar – Peter DiStefano, Danny Jacob
- Trombone – Peter Davies, Richard Edwards
- Trumpet – Andy Crowley, Ian Balmain, Paul Archibald
- Tuba – Owen Slade
- Viola – Bruce White, Jake Walker
- Violin – Everton Nelson, Mark Berrow
- Voices – Lisbeth Scott, Sally Dworsky

Choir

- Choir – Metro Voices
- Alto vocals – Heather Cairncross
- Bass vocals – Lawrence Wallington
- Soprano vocals – Sarah Eyden
- Tenor vocals – Tom Pearce

== Accolades ==
Awards	Category	Recipient(s)	Result	Ref.
Annie Awards	Outstanding Music in an Animated Feature Production	Harry Gregson-Williams and John Powell	Won	
ASCAP Film and Television Music Awards	Top Box Office Films	John Powell	Won	
British Academy Film Awards	Best Film Music	Harry Gregson-Williams and John Powell	Nominated	
BMI Film & TV Awards	Film Music Award	Harry Gregson-Williams	Won	
GoldSpirit Awards	Best Animated Soundtrack	Harry Gregson-Williams and John Powell	Nominated	
Ivor Novello Awards	Best Original Film Score	Harry Gregson-Williams and John Powell	Won	
Motion Picture Sound Editors	Best Sound Editing – Music (Animated Feature)	Brian Richards	Won	
Saturn Awards	Best Score	Harry Gregson-Williams and John Powell	Nominated	
