= Prince of Persia: The Sands of Time (soundtrack) =

Prince of Persia: The Sands of Time (Original Motion Picture Soundtrack)

Film score by Harry Gregson-Williams
- Released: May 25, 2010
- Recorded: 2009–2010
- Studios: Abbey Road, London; Remote Control Productions, Los Angeles
- Genre: Film score
- Length: 66:26
- Label: Walt Disney
- Producer: Hans Zimmer

Harry Gregson-Williams chronology
Shrek Forever After (2010)	Prince of Persia: The Sands of Time (2010)	The Town (2010)

Prince of Persia: The Sands of Time (Original Motion Picture Soundtrack) is the score album to the 2010 film Prince of Persia: The Sands of Time, based on the 2003 video game of the same name. Directed by Mike Newell and produced by Jerry Bruckheimer, the film stars Jake Gyllenhaal, Ben Kingsley, Gemma Arterton, and Alfred Molina. The film features musical score composed by Harry Gregson-Williams and produced by Hans Zimmer. The soundtrack was released through Walt Disney Records on May 25, 2010.

== Development ==
The score to Prince of Persia consists of ancient Persian music employed with Middle Eastern instrumentation. According to Bruckheimer, he described the score as "heroic, haunting and romantic, a throwback to Old Hollywood", further calling it as one of Gregson-Williams' best works.

Gregson-Williams' cited that capturing the geographical nature of the film's musical landscape has been one of the biggest challenges. Though he composed for some of the historical and fantasy films, like Kingdom of Heaven (2005) and The Chronicles of Narnia film series, he wanted to reflect "the sounds, flavors and colors of a Persian city in ancient times", being authentic to the geographical setting of the film, though Bruckheimer did not want him to go to extreme lengths in that respect. Hence, instead of writing a Middle Eastern melody with conventional western arrangement, he would "write melodies that would come naturally to me as a Westerner, and through the orchestration and instrumentation, give some flavor of the geography".

He recalled that his experiences on working in Kingdom of Heaven helped him research through Middle Eastern instruments, which made it quite easier for this film. The score consisted of oud, ney, sitar, electric cello, tabla, percussions, electric violin and a wide range of instruments employed to produce a hybrid score which fuses several elements such as organic, electronic, orchestral and non-orchestral. He further employed an 80-piece orchestra and 40-member vocal choir, and Gregson-Williams used several ancient Persian words for the choir in specific moments on-screen.

The score was recorded, mixed and mastered at the Abbey Road Studios in London for nine months. Hans Zimmer served as the music producer, and Alanis Morissette composed the theme song for the film, named "I Remain".

== Critical reception ==
Christian Clemmensen of Filmtracks.com wrote "though, Prince of Persia is, if you can forgive the likely unintentional thematic references, a remarkably enjoyable score that will probably exceed the expectations of many [...] [Harry] Gregson-Williams has finally infused a fair amount of intelligence and robust orchestral and choral magnificence into a Disney/Bruckheimer production." James Christopher Monger of AllMusic gave three stars to the album, describing it as a combination of Gladiator and Pirates of the Caribbean and concluded it as "a well-executed, spirited romp through popcorn land". Thomas Glorieux of "Prince of Persia: The Sands of Time is somehow the album the fans were hoping for. It carries a wonderful classic main theme, a nice Prince theme and an effective if irritating enemy theme, all the while the typical yet entertaining action music is functioning around it."

== Track listing ==
Prince of Persia: The Sands of Time (Original Motion Picture Soundtrack) track listing
No.	Title	Length
1.	"The Prince of Persia"	5:20
2.	"Raid on Alamut"	6:32
3.	"Tamina Unveiled"	2:34
4.	"The King and His Sons"	2:59
5.	"Dastan and Tamina Escape"	4:30
6.	"Journey Through the Desert"	2:55
7.	"Ostrich Race"	0:58
8.	"Running from Sheikh Amar"	3:27
9.	"Trusting Nizam"	4:37
10.	"Visions of Death"	1:46
11.	"So, You're Going to Help Me?"	2:20
12.	"The Oasis Ambush"	1:54
13.	"Hassansin Attack"	2:59
14.	"Return to Alamut"	3:05
15.	"No Ordinary Dagger"	4:39
16.	"The Passages"	3:09
17.	"The Sands of Time"	3:58
18.	"Destiny"	3:38
19.	"I Remain"	4:57
Total length:		66:17

== Personnel ==
Credits adapted from AllMusic.

- Music – Harry Gregson-Williams
- Music producer – Hans Zimmer
- Additional music – Halli Cauthery
- Music programming – Hybrid, Toby Chu
- Arrangement – Anthony Lledo, Matthew Margeson
- Sound engineer – Costa Kotselas, Lewis Jones, Paul Pritchard, Stanley Gabriel
- Recording and mixing – Peter Cobbin
- Mastering – Christian Wright
- Music editor – John Warhurst, Kirsty Whalley, Mark Jan Wlodarkiewicz, Meri Gavin, Richard Whitfield
- Music supervisor – Monica Zierhut
- Executive producer – Jerry Bruckheimer, Mike Newell

Orchestra

- Orchestration – Geoff Stradling, Jennifer Hammond, Ladd McIntosh
- Orchestra contractor – Isobel Griffiths
- Choirmaster – Chris Foster
- Concertmaster – Perry Montague Mason
- Music preparation – Booker White, Jill Streeter

Instruments

- Electric cello – Martin Tillman
- Electric guitar – Tony Morales, Anthony Lledo
- Electric violin – Hugh Marsh
- Oud – Tony Morales
- Sitar – Anthony Lledo
- Ethnic percussion – Hands On'Semble
- Vocals – Khosro Ansari

Management

- Soundtrack director – Desirée Craig-Ramos
- Creative consultant – Glen Lajeski

== Chart performance ==
Chart performance for Prince of Persia: The Sands of Time (Original Motion Picture Soundtrack)
Chart (2010)	Peak position
UK Soundtrack Albums (OCC)	27
US Top Soundtracks (Billboard)	24
