= Shrek the Third (score) =

2007 film soundtrack album

Shrek the Third (Original Motion Picture Score)

Film score by Harry Gregson-Williams
- Released: June 19, 2007
- Genre: Film score
- Length: 37:13
- Label: Varèse Sarabande

Harry Gregson-Williams chronology
Shrek 2: The Motion Picture Score (2004)	Shrek the Third (Original Motion Picture Score) (2007)	Shrek Forever After: The Motion Picture Score (2010)

Shrek the Third (Original Motion Picture Score) is the film score to the 2007 DreamWorks Animation film Shrek the Third, which is the third instalment in the Shrek franchise and a sequel to Shrek 2 (2004). The film score is composed by recurring franchise collaborator Harry Gregson-Williams and featured 18 tracks. It was released through Varèse Sarabande on June 19, 2007.

== Reception ==
Clark Douglas of Movie Music UK wrote "Maybe it's the fresh warmth of the writing, maybe it's the significantly better recording, or maybe it's just my wonderful giving spirit… but "Shrek the Third" certainly sounds a lot better than I expected it to, and gives me a much-needed dose of encouragement in terms of the capabilities of Harry Gregson-Williams. A rather pleasant surprise, and at forty minutes, just the right length, too. It's the best Gregson-Williams score in at least a couple years, and is recommended." Critic based at AllMusic wrote "As on his earlier SHREK scores, Gregson-Williams playfully mixes Renaissance Fair-like tracks with more dynamic string pieces (see "Charmed & Dangerous"), effectively heightening both the comedy and the drama of the fairytale adventure".

Christian Clemmensen of Filmtracks wrote "Other passing references to fragments of fairy tale themes seem abundant in Shrek the Third, further hammering a wedge into its split personality. It has its moments, but it's definitely a step back from Shrek 2." James Southall of Movie Wave wrote "This is the kind of score which - despite having nothing inherently wrong with it, and indeed quite a lot right with it - just doesn't quite gel together. It's still entertaining, and has several fine moments, but is a step back from the second entry in the series, and frankly there have been so many scores just like this in recent years it's hard to care all that much any more." Ellis J. Wells of Iowa State Daily called it to be a "let down". A. O. Scott of The New York Times felt the score was not "memorable" unlike the predecessors.

Critic based at Scorenotes.com said "Shrek the Third" is an entertaining score. It brings your Harry Gregson-Williams on top of his game, even though he must be feeling an interest in moving on from this series (just a hunch). That said, at no time does it feel like he mailed it in and the music benefits from it. The comedic tones are veiled in imagination, blending warm elements into a score of enjoyment that helps this trilogy conclude with success [...] If you can separate score from the film franchise on some level, you'll be enjoying yet another respectable effort from one of the composing world's brightest talents." Kaya Savas of MovieWeb wrote "There were too many songs and not enough score. Harry Gregson-Williams has been part of this franchise since the beginning and he returned to score the third one despite Andrew Adamson leaving. It feels like that they drown out his score completely with all the songs. Granted you don't go see a movie like this for the score, but I think the score played a big part in the first two and I hardly recall noticing most of it this time around."

== Track listing ==
All tracks are written by Harry Gregson-Williams.

No.	Title	Length
1.	"The Royal Treatment"	2:31
2.	"Fatherly Dreams" (Contains a portain of Pomp and Circumstance by Sir Edward Elgar)	2:19
3.	"The Frog King Dies"	2:51
4.	"Another Adventure"	2:33
5.	"Little Ogre Feet"	1:53
6.	"Worcestershiree?"	1:53
7.	"Charmed & Dangerous"	3:25
8.	"Artie's Sob Story"	1:33
9.	"A Warm & Fuzzy Navel"	2:17
10.	"The Campfire"	1:34
11.	"The Hook Attack"	1:22
12.	"Merlin"	1:48
13.	"The Trip Home"	2:15
14.	"Princess Resistance"	2:26
15.	"The Dressing Room"	2:19
16.	"The Show Begins"	2:03
17.	"King Arthur"	3:30
18.	"(Almost) Alone at Last"	2:01
Total length:		37:13

== Personnel ==
Credits adapted from liner notes:

- Music composer and producer – Harry Gregson-Williams
- Musical arrangements – David Buckley, James McKee Smith, Halli Cauthery, Stephen Barton
- Engineer – Costa Kotselas, Meri Gavin
- Recording – Peter Cobbin
- Mixing – Malcolm Luker
- Mixing assistant – Jamie Luker
- Mastering – Patricia Sullivan-Fourstar
- Music editor – Richard Whitfield
- Music coordinator – Charlene Ann Huang
- Musical assistance – Robin Baynton, Sam O'Kell, Scrap Marshall
- Executive producer – Robert Townson
- Music business affairs – Jennifer Schiller, Lenny Wohl
- Music clearance – Julie Butchko
- Executive in charge of music for DreamWorks Animation – Sunny Park

Instruments

- Cello – Jonathan Williams
- Clarinet – Nicholas Bucknall
- Double Bass – Allen Walley, Steve Mair, Steve McManus
- Flute – Anna Noakes
- Guitar – Peter DiStefano, Tony Morales
- Harp – Skaila Kanga
- Piano – Dave Arch
- Trombone – Peter Davies, Tom Lees
- Trumpet – Andy Crowley, Daniel Newell, Derek Watkins, Paul Archibald, Richard Thomas
- Tuba – Owen Slade
- Viola – Bruce White, Rachel Bolt
- Violin – Chris Clad, Everton Nelson, Mark Berrow, Tom Pigott-Smith

== Awards ==
Award	Date of ceremony	Category	Recipient(s)	Result	Ref.
World Soundtrack Awards	October 20, 2007	Film Composer of the Year	Harry Gregson-Williams (Note: also for Déjà Vu, Flushed Away (2006) and The Number 23 (2007))	Nominated	
World Soundtrack Awards	October 20, 2007	Best Original Film Score of the Year	Harry Gregson-Williams	Nominated	
