= Unstoppable (soundtrack) =

2010 soundtrack album and film score by Harry Gregson-Williams

Unstoppable: Original Motion Picture Soundtrack

Soundtrack album and Film score by Harry Gregson-Williams
- Released: December 7, 2010
- Genre: Film score
- Length: 42:15
- Label: La-La Land Records; Fox Music
- Producer: Harry Gregson-Williams

Harry Gregson-Williams chronology
The Town (2010)	Unstoppable: Original Motion Picture Soundtrack (2010)	Life in a Day (2011)

Professional ratings
Review scores
Source	Rating
Allmusic	3/5 stars

Unstoppable is the soundtrack to the 2010 film of the same name, directed by Tony Scott. It was composed by Harry Gregson-Williams. It was released on December 7, 2010 by La-La Land Records and Fox Music.

== Track listing ==
All music is composed by Harry Gregson-Williams.

No.	Title	Length
1.	"Stanton, PA"	3:32
2.	"Frank Barnes"	2:10
3.	"Will’s Story"	1:56
4.	"Ned"	2:08
5.	"Dewey"	2:24
6.	"Not a Coaster"	2:17
7.	"Are You In or Are You Out?"	6:13
8.	"Realign the Switch"	3:10
9.	"Galvin's Strategy"	2:25
10.	"Playing Chicken with Trains"	1:35
11.	"Will Guides 1206"	4:04
12.	"The Stanton Curve"	6:02
13.	"Who Do I Kiss First?"	4:19
Total length:		42:15

=== Not included in the soundtrack ===
- "Work" by Ciara featuring Missy Elliott
  - The song is used at some parts of the film, particularly at the pre-credits epilogue montage.
- "Country Boy" by Alan Jackson
  - The song is used during Ned's introduction.
