= Costa Kotselas =

American composer, producer and guitarist

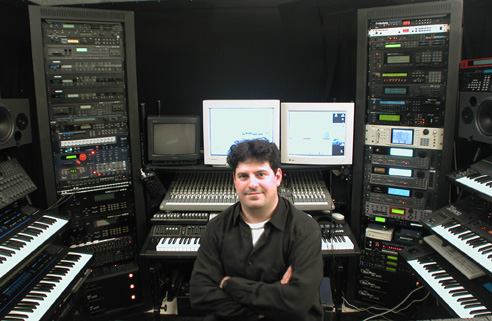
- Costa in studio, Los Angeles, CA

Background information
- Born: Constantine Evangelos Kotselas
- Genres: Film score, television score, video game score, electronic, Metal, Pop, Ethnic Music
- Occupations: Musician, film composer, music producer
- Instruments: Guitar, keyboard, MIDI master keyboard, synthesizer, Cubase
- Years active: 1999–present
- Labels: Sleeping Giant Media
- Website: www.messogeon.com

Costa Kotselas is an American film composer, producer and guitarist. He works in a variety of genres including film, pop, electronic, ethnic and metal. He is known for combining modern rhythms and sounds to create entirely new compositions that could not have been possible at the time while staying true to the original style and form of the film. His music appears in the TV series Charmed and Beverly Hills 90210, in films, including Domino, The Girls' Room, and his aggressive metal style guitars can be heard in films like From Paris With Love and the video games Call of Duty: Ghosts and Call of Duty 4: Modern Warfare.

== Early life and career ==
Born to Greek parents in Fairfax, Virginia, US, he spent most of his summers in Greece and traveling through Europe, where he gained early exposure to different cultures' music, art and religions. At an early age he began playing guitar and had a natural ability to play almost anything he heard by ear. In 1995, Kotselas moved to Los Angeles, California, and began working for Steinburg, the makers of Cubase music software. This position began his musical journey to working with some of his favorite film composers including, Hans Zimmer, Harry Gregson-Williams, Dave Buckley, Graeme Revell, Paul Haslinger and many others. Kotselas worked directly with Zimmer and Gregson-Williams in all aspects of film composition and production in over 30 films.

== Discography ==
=== Guitarist credits ===
- From Paris With Love (Guitars)
- Call of Duty 4: Modern Warfare (Guitars)
- Beer Pong Saved My Live (Guitars)
- Call of Duty: Ghosts (Guitars)

=== Film and television credits ===
- 2003 "Sinbad" (Consulting, Support)
- 2003 "Spy Game" (Consulting, Support, Sound Design, Drum Loop Programming)
- 2004 "Man on Fire" (Consulting, Support)
- 2004 "Shrek 2" (Consulting, Support)
- 2004 "Bridget Jones 2" (Consulting, Support)
- 2004 "Team America: World Police"
- 2005 "Kingdom of Heaven"
- 2005 "Mrs Palfrey at The Claremont"
- 2005 "Domino"
- 2005 "The Chronicles of Narnia:The Lion The Witch and the Wardrobe"
- 2006 "Seraphim Falls"
- 2006 "Flushed Away"
- 2006 "Deja Vu"
- 2007 "Slipstream"
- 2007 "The Number 23"
- 2007 "Slip Stream"
- 2007 "Shrek The 3rd"
- 2007 "Gone Baby Gone"
- 2008 "The Chronicles of Narnia: Prince Caspian"
- 2008 "Jolene"
- 2009 "X-Men Origins: Wolverine"
- 2009 "The Taking of Pelham 1 2 3"
- 2010 "Twelve"
- 2010 "Shrek Forever After"
- 2010 "Prince of Persia: The Sands Of Time"
- 2010 "The Town"
- 2010 "Unstoppable"
- 2011 "Cowboys & Aliens"
- 2011 "Arthur Christmas"
- 2012 "Mister Pip"
- 2012 "Total Recall"
- 2014 "The Equalizer"
- 2015 "Sweet Mickey for President"

==== 2000–2002 ====
- "Black Hawk Down" (Sony) Assistant, Sound Design, Drum Loop Programming
- "Spirit" (DreamWorks) Assistant

==== 1998–2002 ====
- "Bait": Consulting, Sound Design, Drum Loop Programming

==== 1996–2002 ====
- "Crazy Beautiful" Consulting
- "Blue Crush" (Universal) Consulting

==== 1999–2002 ====
- "Titan AE" (Fox) Consulting, Sound Design, Drum Loop Programming
- "Human Nature": Consulting, Sound Design, Drum Loop Programming
