= 2026 in Finnish music =

The following is a list of events and releases that have happened or are expected to happen in 2026 in music in Finland.

== Events ==
=== February ===
- 28 – Linda Lampenius and Pete Parkkonen won Uuden Musiikin Kilpailu with the song "Liekinheitin" and are Finland's representatives in the Eurovision Song Contest.

=== March ===
- 7 – The 2025 Emma Gaala awards proceeded with Emma Johansson as the Musician Of The Year recipient.

=== May ===
- 14 – The annual Steelfest festival started in Hyvinkää (May 14 - 16).
- 16 – Finland placed 6th in the Eurovision song contest
- 22 – The Sonic Rites Festival festival started in Helsinki (May 22 - 23).

=== June ===
- 5 – The Ankea Festival started in Tampere (June 5 - 6).
- 12 – The ODDfest festival started in Helsinki (June 12 - 13).
- 18 – The Nummirock festival started in Nummijärvi (June 18 - 20).
- 25 – The Provinssi festival started in Törnävänsaari, Seinäjoki (June 25 - 27).

=== July ===
- 3 – The annual Baltic Jazz Festival started in Dalsbruk (July 3 - 5).
- 17 – The Ilosaarirock festival started in Joensuu (July 17 - 19).
- 31 – The fourth annual Weekend Festival started in Espoo (July 31 - August 1).

=== August ===
- 1 – The Mikkeli Music Festival started in Mikkeli (August 1 - 8).

== List of albums released ==
=== March ===
Day	Title	Artist	Label	Note	Ref
6	Hell Is a State of Mind	Lost Society	Nuclear Blast		

=== June ===
Day	Title	Artist	Label	Note	Ref
12	Frisson Noir	Tarja Turunen	earMUSIC		

== Deaths ==
=== January ===
- 2 – Ritva Auvinen, opera singer (born 1932, aged 93).

=== March ===
- 15 – Irmeli Mäkelä, pop singer (born 1942, aged 83)

== See also ==
- 2026 in Finland
- Music of Finland
- Finland in the Eurovision Song Contest 2026
- 2026 in music
