= List of number-one singles of 2026 (Finland) =

This is the complete list of number-one singles in Finland in 2026 according to the Official Finnish Charts. The list on the left side of the box (Suomen virallinen singlelista, "the Official Finnish Singles Chart") represents physical and digital track sales as well as music streaming, and the one on the right side (Suomen virallinen radiosoittolista, "the Official Finnish Airplay Chart") represents airplay.

== Chart history ==
List of number-one singles of 2026 in Finland
Official Finnish Singles Chart				Official Finnish Airplay Chart			
Issue date	Song	Artist(s)	Ref.	Issue date	Song	Artist(s)	Ref.
Week 1	"Alcoholic"	Averagekidluke		Week 1	"Voiko enkelitkin eksyä"	Haloo Helsinki!	
Week 2	"Everest"	Minttu		Week 2	"Voiko enkelitkin eksyä"	Haloo Helsinki!	
Week 3	"Aitous ei oo myynnissä"	Gettomasa		Week 3	"Voiko enkelitkin eksyä"	Haloo Helsinki!	
Week 4	"Liekinheitin"	Pete Parkkonen and Linda Lampenius		Week 4	"Voiko enkelitkin eksyä"	Haloo Helsinki!	
Week 5	"Liekinheitin"	Pete Parkkonen and Linda Lampenius		Week 5	"Voiko enkelitkin eksyä"	Haloo Helsinki!	
Week 6	"Ikävä, kyllä"	Ares and Bizi		Week 6	"Voiko enkelitkin eksyä"	Haloo Helsinki!	
Week 7	"Syvä pääty"	Gettomasa and Cledos		Week 7	"Voiko enkelitkin eksyä"	Haloo Helsinki!	
Week 8	"Sisko ja sen veli"	Ahti		Week 8	"Voiko enkelitkin eksyä"	Haloo Helsinki!	
Week 9	"Palamaan"	Isac Elliot and Mirella		Week 9	"Voiko enkelitkin eksyä"	Haloo Helsinki!	
Week 10	"Liekinheitin"	Pete Parkkonen and Linda Lampenius		Week 10	"Liekinheitin"	Pete Parkkonen and Linda Lampenius	
Week 11	"Liekinheitin"	Pete Parkkonen and Linda Lampenius		Week 11	"Liekinheitin"	Pete Parkkonen and Linda Lampenius	
Week 12	"Liekinheitin"	Pete Parkkonen and Linda Lampenius		Week 12	"Liekinheitin"	Pete Parkkonen and Linda Lampenius	
Week 13	"Poikaystävä"	Korelon and Sara Bee		Week 13	"Liekinheitin"	Pete Parkkonen and Linda Lampenius	
Week 14	"Poitsu"	Ahti		Week 14	"Liekinheitin"	Pete Parkkonen and Linda Lampenius	
Week 15	"Kaikki viel edessä"	Mirella		Week 15	"Liekinheitin"	Pete Parkkonen and Linda Lampenius	
Week 16	"Hei Supermario"	Samuell		Week 16	"Liekinheitin"	Pete Parkkonen and Linda Lampenius	
Week 17	"Perhonen"	Lauri Haav		Week 17	"Liekinheitin"	Pete Parkkonen and Linda Lampenius	
Week 18	"M0ti0n"	Louna0nline		Week 18	"Liekinheitin"	Pete Parkkonen and Linda Lampenius	
Week 19	"M0ti0n"	Louna0nline		Week 19	"Liekinheitin"	Pete Parkkonen and Linda Lampenius	
Week 20	"Onko jossain"	Gettomasa		Week 20	"Liekinheitin"	Pete Parkkonen and Linda Lampenius	
Week 21	"Liekinheitin"	Pete Parkkonen and Linda Lampenius		Week 21	"Liekinheitin"	Pete Parkkonen and Linda Lampenius	
Week 22	"Tuhlaajapoika"	Ani and Sara Bee		Week 22	"Liekinheitin"	Pete Parkkonen and Linda Lampenius	
Week 23	"Pidä kii"	Mirella and Lauri Haav		Week 23	"Liekinheitin"	Pete Parkkonen and Linda Lampenius	
Week 24	"Pidä kii"	Mirella and Lauri Haav		Week 24	"Liekinheitin"	Pete Parkkonen and Linda Lampenius	
Week 25	"Sinfoniaa"	Isac Elliot		Week 25	"Liekinheitin"	Pete Parkkonen and Linda Lampenius	
Week 26	"Valokuvii"	Jami Faltin		Week 26	"Liekinheitin"	Pete Parkkonen and Linda Lampenius	
Week 27	"Valokuvii"	Jami Faltin		Week 27	"Liekinheitin"	Pete Parkkonen and Linda Lampenius	
Week 28	"Eilinen"	Isac Elliot and Ares		Week 28	"Liekinheitin"	Pete Parkkonen and Linda Lampenius	
Week 29	"Eilinen"	Isac Elliot and Ares		Week 29	"Voiko enkelitkin eksyä"	Haloo Helsinki!	
Week 30	"Eilinen"	Isac Elliot and Ares		Week 30	"New Religion"	Bebe Rexha and Faithless	
Week 31	"Kaiken varalta"	Isac Elliot		Week 31	"Voiko enkelitkin eksyä"	Haloo Helsinki!	
Week 32	"Kaiken varalta"	Isac Elliot		Week 32	"Voiko enkelitkin eksyä"	Haloo Helsinki!	
Week 33	"Kaiken varalta"	Isac Elliot		Week 33	"Voiko enkelitkin eksyä"	Haloo Helsinki!	
Week 34	"Väärä nainen"	Ida		Week 34	"Tuhlaajapoika"	Ani and Sara Bee	
Week 35	"Väärä nainen"	Ida		Week 35	"Tuhlaajapoika"	Ani and Sara Bee	
Week 36	"Väärä nainen"	Ida		Week 36	"Tuhlaajapoika"	Ani and Sara Bee	
Week 37	"Väärä nainen"	Ida		Week 37	"Tuhlaajapoika"	Ani and Sara Bee	
Week 38	"Ei riidellä enää*"	Cledos		Week 38	"Tuhlaajapoika"	Ani and Sara Bee	
Week 39	"Ei riidellä enää*"	Cledos		Week 39	"Tuhlaajapoika"	Ani and Sara Bee	
Week 40	"Ei riidellä enää*"	Cledos		Week 40	"Tuhlaajapoika"	Ani and Sara Bee	
Week 41	"Sydän"	Viivi (featuring Elastinen)		Week 41	"Tuhlaajapoika"	Ani and Sara Bee	
Week 42	"Sydän"	Viivi (featuring Elastinen)		Week 42	"Tuhlaajapoika"	Ani and Sara Bee	
Week 43	"Menestys on paras tapa kostaa"	Nelli Matula		Week 43	"Tuhlaajapoika"	Ani and Sara Bee	
Week 44	"Pimeä onni"	Ares and Pehmoaino		Week 44	"Tuhlaajapoika"	Ani and Sara Bee	
Week 45	"Pimeä onni"	Ares and Pehmoaino		Week 45	"Tuhlaajapoika"	Ani and Sara Bee	
Week 46	"Pimeä onni"	Ares and Pehmoaino		Week 46	"Väärä nainen"	Ida	
Week 47	"Lucky Me"	Isac Elliot and Mikael Gabriel		Week 47	"Tuhlaajapoika"	Ani and Sara Bee	

== See also ==
- List of number-one albums of 2026 (Finland)
