= Uuden edessä =

Single by Toivon kärki
- Released: April 10, 2020
- Label: 3:58
- Songwriters: Lauri Tähkä; Timo Kiiskinen
- Producers: Jukka Immonen; Jurek; Antti Riihimäki; Eppu Kosonen

Music video
- "Uuden edessä" on YouTube

"Uuden edessä" is a song by Finnish group Toivon kärki, released on 10 April 2020 through Warner Music Finland. The proceeds of the song were directed to Finnish Red Cross to help people in Finland who have been affected by COVID-19 pandemic. The song was written by Lauri Tähkä and Timo Kiiskinen and produced by Jukka Immonen, Jurek, Antti Riihimäki and Eppu Kosonen.

== Artists and musicians ==
The song features 90 artists and 60 other music makers.

- Abreu
- Aki Tykki
- Ako Kiiski
- Aleksanteri Hakaniemi
- Alma
- Alpo Nummelin
- Anna Puu
- Anssi Kela
- Antti Ketonen
- Antti Lehtinen
- Arttu Peljo
- Arttu Wiskari
- Behm
- Brädi
- Chisu
- Cledos
- Costee
- Costello Hautamäki
- Dalia Porra
- Darude
- DJPP
- Elastinen
- Elias Kaskinen
- Ellinoora
- Eppu Kosonen
- Erin
- Eva & Manu
- F
- Gracias
- Gugi
- Haloo Helsinki!
- Hannu Korkeamäki
- Heikki Kytölä
- HesaÄijä
- Heviteemu
- Ida Paul
- Ilkka Alanko
- Ilkka Tolonen
- Ilkka Wirtanen
- Ilta
- Irina
- Jaakko Kääriäinen
- Janna
- Jannika B
- Jari Väyliö
- Jarkko Kumpulainen
- Jaron & Istala
- Jay Kortehisto
- Jenni Mustajärvi
- Jenni Vartiainen
- Jesse Markin
- Joel Melasniemi
- Jonna Tervomaa
- Jori Sjöroos
- Jouni Aslak
- Juha Kuoppala
- Jukka Eskola
- Jukka Immonen
- Jukka Poika
- Jurek
- Jussi Rainio
- JVG
- Kaija Koo
- Kalevi Louhivuori
- Kalle Lindroth
- Kalle Mäkipelto
- Kalle Torniainen
- Karri Koira
- Katri Helena
- Katri Ylander
- Knipi
- Kyösti Mäkimattila
- Lasse Enersen
- Lasse Kurki
- Lasse Piirainen
- Laura Närhi
- Laura Voutilainen
- Lauri Porra
- Lauri Tähkä
- Lenni-Kalle Taipale
- Leri Leskinen
- Lukas Leon
- Maarit
- Maija Vilkkumaa
- Mariska
- Matias Keskiruokanen
- Matti Mikkola
- Michael Monroe
- Mikael Gabriel
- Mikko Harju
- Mikko Kaakkuriniemi
- Mikko Kosonen
- Minna Koivisto
- Mira Luoti
- Nelli Matula
- Olavi Uusivirta
- OP Beats
- Osmo Ikonen
- Paleface
- Pasi ja Anssi
- PastoriPike
- Pauli Hanhiniemi
- Pete Parkkonen
- Pikku G
- Portion Boys
- Rafael Elivuo
- Redrama
- Reino Nordin
- Ressu Redford
- Riku Rajamaa
- Risto Asikainen
- Risto Niinikoski
- Risto Rikala
- Roope Salminen
- Rzy
- Saara Aalto
- Sakke Aalto
- Sami Kuoppamäki
- Sami Osala
- Sami Yaffa
- Sampo Haapaniemi
- Samu Haber
- Samuli Edelmann
- Samuli Sirviö
- Sanni
- Sara Siipola
- Seksikäs-Suklaa
- Sini Yasemin
- Skywalk
- Stig
- Suvi Teräsniska
- Svante Forsbäck
- Teleks
- Tero Palo
- Tero Sundell
- Tero Vesterinen
- Thomas Rönnholm
- Tido
- Timo Kiiskinen
- Timo Kämäräinen
- Timo Lassy
- Tippa
- Titta
- Tomi Saario
- Tommi Läntinen
- Toni Kulku
- Toni Wirtanen
- Tuukka Tuunanen
- Tuure Boelius
- Tuure Kilpeläinen
- Uniikki
- Vesala
- Vesta
- Viivi
- Vilma Alina
- Waltteri Torikka
- Younghearted

== Charts ==
Chart (2020)	Peak position
Finland (Suomen virallinen lista)	2
