= Vilma Alina =

Finnish singer-songwriter (born 1993)

- Lähteenmäki in 2017

Background information
- Born: Vilma Alina Lähteenmäki; 8 August 1993 (age 33); Helsinki, Finland
- Genre: Pop
- Occupations: Singer; songwriter
- Instruments: Vocals; keyboard
- Years active: 2014–present
- Label: Universal Music Finland

Vilma Alina Lähteenmäki (born 8 August 1993) is a Finnish singer-songwriter who goes under the name Vilma Alina.

== Background ==
Lähteenmäki was born and grew up in Helsinki. She had an interest in music as a teen.

== Career ==
Lähteenmäki began her career by posting videos on YouTube with a vocal looper. A medley of Robin Packalen and Anssi Kela songs was noticed by Kela. In 2013, at the age of 19, she joined Packalen's band as a keyboardist. She released her debut single "Hullut asuu Kallios" in 2014.

Her debut album Ufoja was released in 2016 and was featured as YleX's Album of the Week. She collaborated with the Teflon Brothers on a track on Ufoja, titled "Juha88". Lähteenmäki left Packalen's band in 2016 to pursue a solo career.

In 2017, she wrote "Hula Hula" for Packalen and Nelli Matula. The following year, she released her single "Palasina". In 2019, she released her track "Ballerina" and her second album Tulva.

In 2020, she was awarded the Light Music Artist of the Year Award by the Finnish Music Producers Association. In the same year, she released the singles "Nuoret rakastavaiset" and "Rikollinen". "Rikollinen" achieved platinum streaming status.

She released her third album True Crime in 2021. Lähteenmäki stated that the album was pop.

She was nominated as Musical Artist of the Year at the Emma Gaala 2023 and 2024.

In 2026, she co-wrote Finland's entry for the Eurovision Song Contest that year, "Liekinheitin" with Antti Riihimäki and Lauri Halavaara. "Liekinheitin" placed sixth in the Grand Final and was performed by Linda Lampenius and Pete Parkkonen. The song was chosen as the song of the year by the Finnish Music Producers Association.

== Artistry ==
Influences on her early music include Rudimental, Massive Attack and British electronic music.

== Songwriting credits ==
=== Singles ===
- "Hullut asuu Kallios" by Vilma Alina (2014)
- "Juha88" by Vilma Alina and the Teflon Brothers (2016)
- "Hula Hula" by Robin Packalen and Nelli Matula (2017)
- "Palasina" by Vilma Alina (2018)
- "Ballerina" by Vilma Alina (2019)
- "Nuoret rakastavaiset" by Vilma Alina (2020)
- "Rikollinen" by Vilma Alina (2020)
- "Ihana kipu" by Viivi and Robin Packalen (2022)
- "Mitä näil korteil saa" by Viivi and JVG (2023)
- "Missio" by BESS (2023)
- "Liekinheitin" by Pete Parkkonen and Linda Lampenius

== Discography ==
=== Albums ===
- Ufoja (2016)
- Tulva (2019)
- True Crime (2021)

=== Singles ===
- "Hullut asuu Kallios" (2014)
- "Juhaa88" (2016)
- "Palasina" (2018)
- "Ballerina" (2019)
- "Nuoret rakastavaiset" (2020)
- "Rikollinen" (2020)
