= Liekinheitin =

2026 song by Linda Lampenius and Pete Parkkonen

Single by Linda Lampenius and Pete Parkkonen
- Language: Finnish
- English title: "Flamethrower"
- Released: 16 January 2026
- Genre: Pop-rock; electro-pop-classical crossover
- Length: 3:00
- Label: Universal; PME
- Songwriters: Antti Riihimäki; Lauri Halavaara; Linda Lampenius; Pete Parkkonen; Vilma Alina Lähteenmäki
- Producers: Halavaara; Riihimäki

Linda Lampenius singles chronology
"Myrskyluodon maija" (2021)	"Liekinheitin" (2026)

Pete Parkkonen singles chronology
"Joulurauhaa" (2022)	"Liekinheitin" (2026)

Music video
- "Liekinheitin" on YouTube

Eurovision Song Contest 2026 entry
- Country: Finland
- Artists: Linda Lampenius and Pete Parkkonen
- Languages: Finnish
- Composers: Antti Riihimäki; Lauri Halavaara; Linda Lampenius; Pete Parkkonen; Vilma Alina Lähteenmäki
- Lyricists: Antti Riihimäki; Lauri Halavaara; Linda Lampenius; Pete Parkkonen; Vilma Alina Lähteenmäki

Finals performance
- Semi-final result: 3rd
- Semi-final points: 227
- Final result: 6th
- Final points: 279

Entry chronology
- ◄ "Ich komme" (2025)

Official performance video
- "Liekinheitin" (first semi-final) on YouTube "Liekinheitin" (grand final) on YouTube

"Liekinheitin" (Finnish: [ˈlie̯kinˌhei̯t̪in]; transl. "Flamethrower") is a song by Finnish violinist Linda Lampenius and Finnish singer-songwriter Pete Parkkonen. A track about conflicting perspectives of a relationship which is musically represented as a dialogue between vocals and violin, it was composed by Lampenius and Parkkonen, together with Antti Riihimäki, Lauri Halavaara, and Vilma Alina Lähteenmäki, and was released on 16 January 2026 through Universal Music Oy and PME Records. After winning the Finnish national final Uuden Musiikin Kilpailu 2026, it represented Finland at the Eurovision Song Contest 2026, and finished in sixth place in the grand final with 279 points.

"Liekinheitin" received generally positive reviews from domestic and international music critics and artists, who frequently praised Parkkonen's vocals, Lampenius's live violin playing, and the entry's elaborate staging. Several publications have also ranked the track among the best songs of the 2026 contest due to its dramatic energy and appeal as highly fitting for Eurovision. Nevertheless, some reviewers directed criticism at the song's lyrical content, generic musical arrangement, and the absence of a strong melodic hook.

"Liekinheitin" became a commercial success in Finland, peaking at number one on the Official Finnish Singles chart. It also reached the top five in Greece and Sweden, and further charted in Austria, Lithuania, Norway, Switzerland, and the UK Singles Sales chart.

== Background and composition ==
"Liekinheitin" was written by Linda Lampenius and Pete Parkkonen, with Antti Riihimäki, Lauri Halavaara, and Vilma Alina. The song was also produced by Riihimäki and Halavaara. It is described as a "pop behemoth" with elements of rock, classical, and techno, composed with a tempo of 146 beats per minute.

The collaboration between the two artists started when Riihimäki contacted Parkkonen during a break in one of his performances. At the time, Lampenius was already in the studio developing the song's structure alongside Riihimäki, Lähteenmäki, and Halavaara. The production team had been evaluating potential collaborators for the track before finalising the partnership with Parkkonen.

Thematically, the song explores the idea of a "fiery yet frozen" relationship. Lampenius described the lyrics as being about a person who is "burning hot but suddenly turns ice cold". Parkkonen further added that the song represents a dialogue between two perspectives: the one trying to get close and the one who does not dare let go. This duality is reflected in the instrumentation, where the violin and vocals are intended to "speak" to one another. In an interview with The Independent, the duo explained:

"The protagonist in "Liekinheitin" can either be seen as the victim of someone’s behaviour, or as a person who becomes addicted to other people, even when they know that the relationship will never evolve. It symbolises the passion these two people are experiencing, but it’s also the desperation that could kill you."

== Release and music video ==
The song was officially released as a single on 16 January 2026 through Universal Music Oy and PME Records. The music video, directed by Vertti Virkajärvi, was simultaneously released on Yle Areena and the official YouTube channel of Uuden Musiikin Kilpailu. Within its first week of release, the video surpassed one million views on YouTube, making it the fastest-growing video in the history of Uuden Musiikin Kilpailu.

== Promotion ==
To promote "Liekinheitin" before the Eurovision Song Contest 2026, Lampenius and Parkkonen announced their intent to participate in various Eurovision pre-parties. They participated at Eurovision in Concert 2026 which was held at AFAS Live Arena in Amsterdam on 11 April 2026. They also performed at the London Eurovision Party 2026 held at Here at Outernet on 19 April 2026.

Prior to their participation in the Eurovision pre-parties, Lampenius was interviewed by Wilma Peltomäki on Sveriges Radio Finska. Following the pre-parties, the duo held a meet and greet event at Forum in Helsinki. The city of Tampere also brought a Finnish sauna lounge to Vienna which was heated at Riesenradplatz from 12 to 16 May 2026 to support the Finnish entry. The said project is a continuation of the events in Basel following last year's contest.

== Critical reception ==
Following its victory at the Finnish national selection, "Liekinheitin" emerged as one of the favorites to win the Eurovision Song Contest. (Note: Attributed to multiple sources:) In the weeks leading up to the actual contest, the entry consistently occupied the top tiers of major betting aggregators and fan polls. The song was also met with generally positive reviews from both domestic and international music critics and personalities.

=== Finnish media and personalities ===
Juuso Määttänen of Helsingin Sanomat characterised the song as "safe erotic pop", praising Parkkonen's vocals and Lampenius' violin melodies while noting that its progression toward an "explosive climax" was reminiscent of previous Eurovision entries, specifically JJ's "Wasted Love" and Erika Vikman's "Ich komme". Writing for Ilta-Sanomat, Iiro Myllymäki gave the song a generally positive review, praising the chemistry between Parkkonen and Lampenius, and considered the entry having the best chance of success at Eurovision, despite offering a minor criticism regarding the song's "weak hook" and the lack of connection between the title and the chorus. He also called the entry "so Eurovision that it is almost a parody", though he noted that in the context of the contest, "too much is rarely enough". In a review for the magazine Seiska, Toni Keränen described the track as "strong" with a compelling dramatic pulse. While he suggested the song might be "better without the solo violin" due to a personal preference for orchestral arrangements, he acknowledged Lampenius as an "impressive" and "must-have" part of the entry. He concluded that the song would "certainly be a success" if it reached the final.

The song has also been received positively by Finnish artists, including UMK winners Erika Vikman and Krista Siegfrids, former UMK participants Sara Siipola, Bess, and Tiina Forsby of Portion Boys, and Finnish personalities, including Maria Veitola and Johannes Holopainen, among others. Lead vocalist Tomi Putaansuu of the Eurovision 2006 winning band Lordi also provided a generally positive assessment of the song, describing it as "quite good" with a "cool vibe", but he noted difficulty in identifying a definitive "hook". While he admitted the arrangement was somewhat confusing to him, to which he attributed to his own preference for simpler heavy metal, he concluded that the entry "looks and sounds good" overall.

On the radio show Herman & Toivonen: Very Important Content, musicians Mitja Toivonen and Olli Herman gave the song a polarising review, despite giving it a rating of 7.5 and 8.5, respectively. Toivonen praised its potential for a "grandiose" stage performance, while Herman specifically commended Lampenius's violin performance and Parkkonen's vocal ability. However, the latter heavily criticised the song's lyrical content, describing it as "toxic" and "repulsive". Using a metaphor based on Snow White, he compared the narrative to a protagonist knowingly consuming a poisoned apple and returning for more, which he argued portrayed a highly unhealthy relationship.

=== Swedish media and personalities ===
Hanna Fahl from the newspaper Dagens Nyheter identified the song as one of the "standouts" of the 2026 contest, describing it as a "strangely schlager-nostalgic kitsch party" and comparing its elaborate drama to the parody songs from the film Eurovision Song Contest: The Story of Fire Saga. She characterised the performance as an "archaic saga about fire, heroes and love", and noted that the "fiery retro duet" between Lampenius and Parkkonen was "exactly what the contest needed". Journalist Tobbe Ek praised the entry for meeting the "three criteria" he deemed essential for Eurovision success: a good song, a strong vocal delivery, and an amazing stage performance. He praised Parkkonen’s vocals and complimented Lampenius's "strong presence" on stage, likening her to an Amazon.

Writing for Expressen, Maria Brander rated the entry a five out of five, calling their performance as having an "operatic bombastic staging heading towards a climax and its own dimension of ESC divinity". Eva Frantz of the Swedish-language department of Yle gave the song a rating of nine out of 10, calling the duo "calm, experienced and incredibly skilled". She also noted that the entry being performed in Finnish is a "good choice", since she described the song's lyrics as "a bit buggy in places".

=== Eurovision-related and international media ===
Glen Weldon of National Public Radio ranked the entry first on his list of the 10 best songs competing at Eurovision 2026, calling it "iconic", "powerful", "Eurovision distilled to its glitterbomb essence", and "will get the crowd on its feet". While noting that the lyrics offered little innovation, relying on "the go-to ESC imagery of love as flames", he praised the track's structure and progression. Writing for the Serbian newspaper Danas, Pero Jovović dubbed the entry a "carefully balanced blend of pop, rock and film music" and noted that the violin element of the song gives it an "extra dimension, creating an atmosphere reminiscent of film scores, but with the energy of a contemporary performance". He also praised Parkkonen's vocals by calling it "powerful and emotional", which results to the song "leaving a strong first impression and is easy to remember".

In the Dutch newspaper de Volkskrant, Robert van Gijssel and Els de Grefte dubbed the song as one of the 10 best Eurovision songs of 2026, noting that the track relies on the interplay between "Lampenius' triumphant violin playing" and Parkkonen's "somewhat overly passionate rock voice". They also observed that the two elements engage in a dialogue over a "basic dance beat and the distorted and quite adventurous electronics", resulting in a unique sound defined by "unmistakable Eurovision glitter". Maria Sherman from the Associated Press also included the entry on her list of the 10 best performances of the 2026 contest, calling it "electrified" and the duo a "winning combination".

Zachary Stewart of TheaterMania ranked the song second on his list of the five best Eurovision songs of 2026. He praised the entry for hitting the "Eurovision sweet spots", describing it as an up-tempo dance song that remains "malleable enough to spawn a thousand soulful covers". He further anticipated that the performance by Lampenius and Parkkonen would be a "showstopper". In the British newspaper The Guardian, Michael Hogan added the entry on his list of the 11 biggest bangers in this year's contest, describing it as an "angsty techno-ballad" with "overly literal pyrotechnics". In a live review for the same publication, Heidi Stephens wrote that the "absolutely scorching staging" and Lampenius' violin playing elevated the song despite describing the entry as "a bit dated".

Writing for the Norwegian newspaper Dagbladet, Ralf Lofstad gave the song a five out of six, praising Lampenius' live violin playing and Parkkonen's vocals, describing the entry as having a "dance rhythm with a very Eastern European expression", and mentioned that the track is the best of the semi-final. However, he commented that the song is "quite generic" that is "dragged up by all the other elements". In TV 2, Line Haus also gave the entry a five out of six, calling the combination of "pompous classical music with modern pop" a "hit", but noted that the staging felt "quite inaccessible" to the viewers due to the lack of eye contact. Jon O'Brien from Vulture ranked the entry ninth out of the 35 entries, describing it as a "fiery duet" that combined classical violin with Parkkonen's "gruff vocals". Although he noted a lack of a strong melodic hook, he felt the entry's "sheer ridiculousness" could be sufficient to win the contest.

== Eurovision Song Contest 2026 ==
=== Uuden Musiikin Kilpailu 2026 ===
Uuden Musiikin Kilpailu 2026 was the national final format organised by Yle to select the Finnish representative for the Eurovision Song Contest 2026. The competition saw seven entries competing in a final on 28 February 2026. Results during the final were determined based on votes from the public and an international jury, with the final result being 75% of the public vote and 25% of the jury vote. Lampenius and Parkkonen were officially announced to compete in Uuden Musiikin Kilpailu 2026 on 14 January 2026, with their song released the following day. "Liekinheitin" was drawn to perform seventh at the final, and won the contest with 570 points, scoring 492 points from public vote and 78 points from the jury vote.

For its UMK performance, the creative team were composed of Ari Levelä, Reija Wäre, Juha-Matti Valtonen, Sergio Jaén, and Matti Myllyaho. It also utilised black-clad stagehands called "ninjas" to aid the duo in their performance. The staging featured a dilapidated orchestra stand with chairs and benches both upright and upside down. Lampenius stood on a chair at the beginning of the performance, and Parkkonen was at the front of the stage. The performance also featured flames and other pyrotechnics. Lampenius and Parkkonen remained apart for the most part during the performance which reflects the themes of the song, with them being separated by a burning confessional. The performance ends with Lampenius and Parkkonen meeting in front of the chairs, with the chairs rising into the air.

=== At Eurovision ===
The Eurovision Song Contest 2026 took place at Wiener Stadthalle in Vienna, Austria, and consisted of two semi-finals held on the respective dates of 12 and 14 May and the final on 16 May 2026. During the allocation draw held on 12 January 2026, Finland was drawn to compete in the first semi-final, performing in the first half of the show. Lampenius and Parkkonen were later drawn to perform seventh, after Italy's Sal Da Vinci and before Montenegro's Tamara Živković.

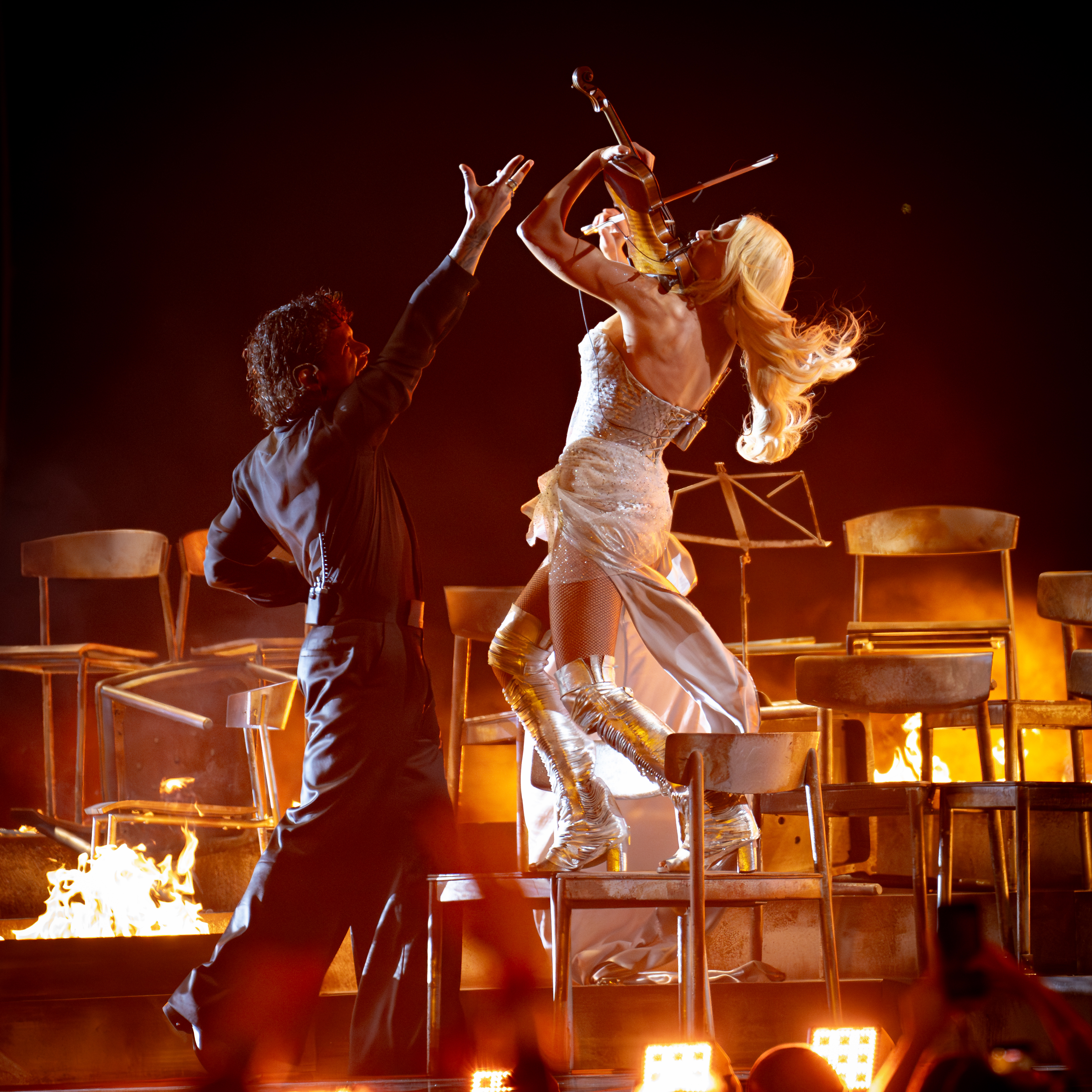
Parkkonen and Lampenius performing "Liekinheitin" during the Eurovision 2026 first semi-final

For their Eurovision performance, the staging was similar to the one performed at the Finnish national selection. The duo were accompanied by Jepa Lambert, Heini Ikonen, and Hanna Marttila as backing singers. Further, Lampenius and Parkkonen wore stage costumes designed by Finnish fashion designer Teemu Muurimäki together with Emilia Kärkkäinen. Lampenius' outfit, sewn by Jaana Björklund, consisted of a silver strapless outfit with layered fabric, decorated with rhinestones and tulle paired with silver high boots. Parkkonen wore a slightly transparent black silk chiffon shirt sewn by Elviira Medel.

During the rehearsals, Lampenius was permitted by the EBU to play parts of her violin solos live after seeking permission months prior; the latter subsequently releasing a statement that the decision is in accordance with the rules of this year's contest stating that "live audio capture of instruments may exceptionally be permitted where artistically justified". With this, Lampenius performed using a 1781 Gagliano violin. "Liekinheitin" finished third in the semi-final, scoring 227 points and securing a position for the grand final.

Lampenius and Parkkonen performed a repeat of their performance in the grand final on 16 May. The song performed 17th, after Moldova's Satoshi and before Poland's Alicja. The duo finished sixth with 279 points, with a split score of 141 points from the juries and 138 points from public televoting. Regarding the former, the song received two sets of 12 points from Estonia and Sweden. The song also received two sets of 12 points from the public televote given by the same two countries. In response to their result, Lampenius and Parkkonen expressed happiness and satisfaction, with Lampenius expressing feelings of victory about playing live on the Eurovision stage.

== Awards and nominations ==
Awards and nominations for "Liekinheitin"
Year	Award	Category	Result	Ref.
2026	MPA Finland 50th Anniversary Gala	Song of the Year	Won	

== Charts ==
Chart performance for "Liekinheitin"
Chart (2026)	Peak position
Austria (Ö3 Austria Top 40)	17
Finland (Suomen virallinen lista)	1
Finland Airplay (Radiosoittolista)	1
Greece International (IFPI)	5
Lithuania (AGATA)	14
Norway (IFPI Norge)	99
Sweden (Sverigetopplistan)	5
Switzerland (Schweizer Hitparade)	75
UK Singles Sales (OCC)	52

== Release history ==
Release dates and formats for "Liekinheitin"
Region	Date	Format(s)	Version	Label	Ref.
Various	16 January 2026	Digital download; streaming	Original	Universal; PME	

== See also ==
- List of number-one singles of 2026 (Finland)
