= Carina E. Nilsson =

Swedish pianist

Carina E. Nilsson is a Swedish pianist.

== Biography ==
Nilsson is one of the most popular pianists in Sweden. Her repertoire ranges from classical to pop, jazz and gospel music. She plays regularly on TV and radio as well as in public concerts, including concert halls and churches, galas and corporate events. Nilsson has done well over 4000 performances during her career, around 250 performances in a year. She performs both as a soloist and as an accompanist. She has worked with artists like Linda Bengtzing, Sofia Källgren, Monica Ramos and Lill-Babs. Nilsson has also played with violinist Linda Lampenius on a regular basis since 2005, performing with her in Europe, Russia and the United States.
