= Evelina (singer) =

Finnish singer and songwriter (born 1995)

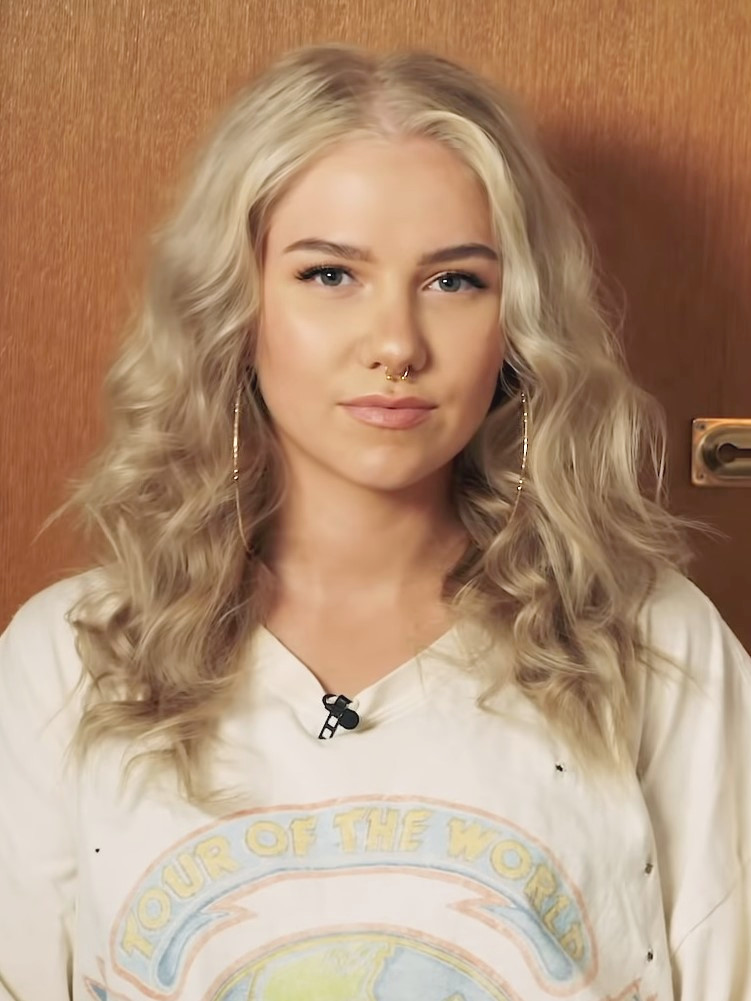
- Evelina in 2019.

Background information
- Born: Eveliina Tammenlaakso; 27 May 1995 (age 31); Turku, Finland
- Genres: Pop; synthpop; hip hop
- Years active: 2011–present
- Labels: UMG; M-Eazy Music

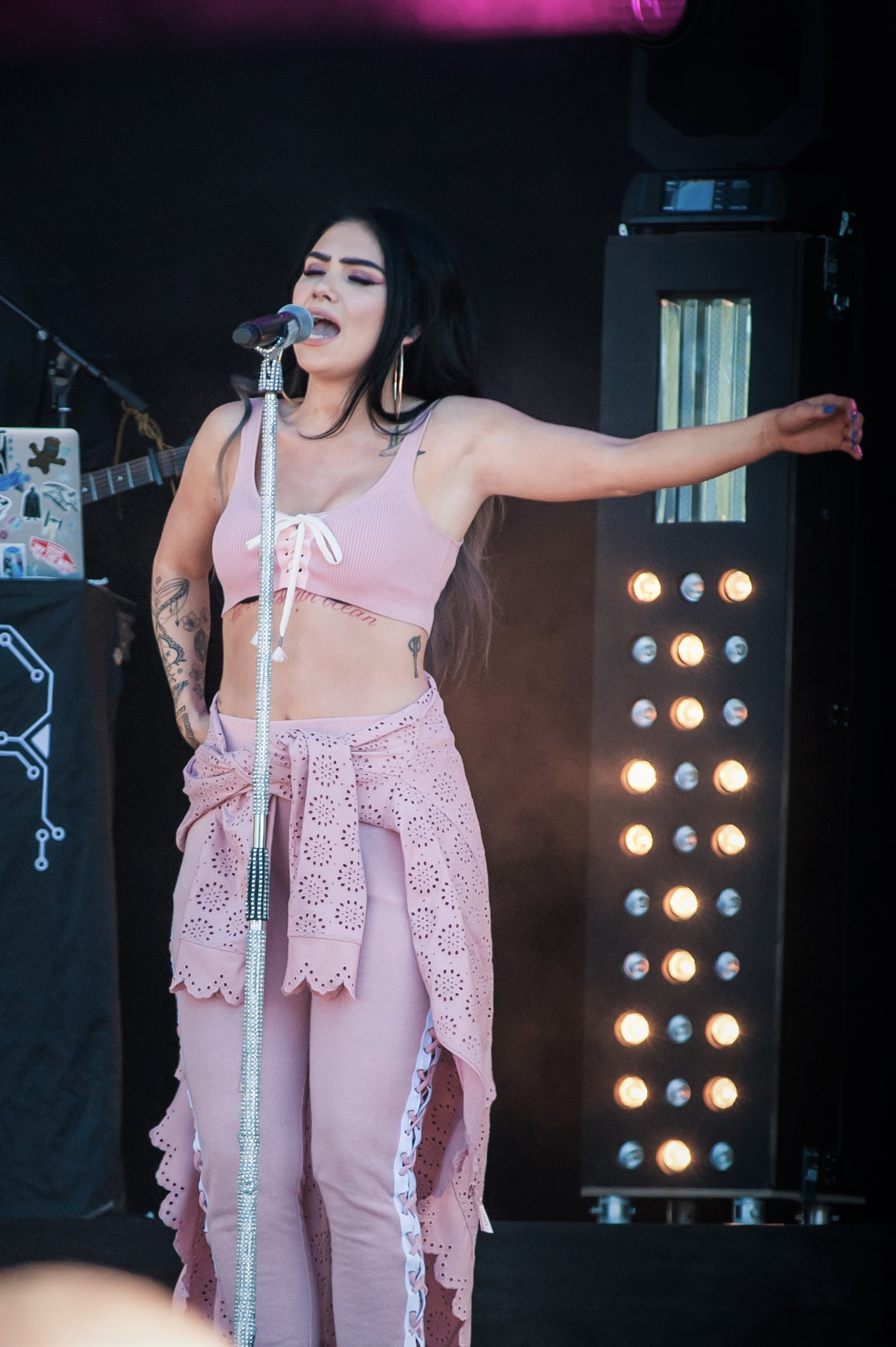
Evelina performing in the Ilosaarirock Festival in 2017.

Eveliina Tammenlaakso (born 27 May 1995), better known as simply Evelina, is a Finnish singer and songwriter. She is signed to the Universal Music Group label M-Eazy Music.

== Life and career ==
Evelina was born as Eveliina Tammenlaakso in Turku. She first began her music career in 2011 as a contestant in season one of The Voice of Finland, where she was a member of Elastinen's team. She was eliminated during the live shows.

In 2015, Evelina signed a record deal with the Universal Music Group label M-Eazy Music and released her debut double single "Rakkaudesta lajiin"/"Vuoristorataa" in May 2015. She released her breakthrough single later in the year called "Honey", featuring Finnish rapper Mikael Gabriel and penned with American songwriter Hope Raney. The song became a hit in Finland, and reached number-one on the Finnish singles chart. The following year she also released the singles "Sireenit" and "Sushi", which also became top ten hits. Her debut album 24K sold platinum before being released in 2016.

In 2018, Evelina won the Female Soloist of the Year award in Emma-gaala.

Evelina was diagnosed with autism in the fall of 2022.

== Discography ==
=== Albums ===
Year	Title	Peak position
Year	Title	FIN Albums
2016	24K	2
2019	SOS	2
2020	III	3
2023	Pehmee	2

=== EPs ===
Year	Title	Peak position
Year	Title	FIN Albums
2022	3½	2

=== Singles ===
Year	Title	Peak position			Album
Year	Title	FIN Singles	FIN Downloads	FIN Airplay	Album
2015	"Rakkaudesta lajiin" (featuring Eevil Stöö)	—	—	—	24K
2015	"Vuoristorataa"	—	—	—	24K
2015	"Honey" (featuring Mikael Gabriel)	1	3	5	24K
2016	"Sireenit"	1	1	13	24K
2016	"Sushi" (featuring JVG)	3	7	—	24K
2016	"Ei filtterii"	2		—	24K
2016	"Fuulaa" (featuring Julma H)	16		—	24K
2017	"Kylmii väreitä"	2			SOS
2017	"Tornado"	3		—	SOS
2017	"Katri Helena"	4		—	SOS
2018	"Sun vika"	1		—	SOS
2018	"Vielä kerran"	4		—	SOS
2018	"F-F-F-Falling"	7		—	Vain elämää kausi 9
2018	"Leijonakuningas"	14		—	Vain elämää kausi 9
2018	"Asfalttiviidakko"	6		—	Vain elämää kausi 9
2018	"Eloon!"	18		—	Vain elämää kausi 9
2018	"Aamu"	18		—	Vain elämää kausi 9
2018	"Nostalgiaa"	2		—	SOS
2019	"Miks"	3		—	SOS
2020	"Hitaasti"	2		—	III
2021	"Me ei kuuluta toisillemme" (with Ani)	7		—	Pehmee
2022	"Kyynelii"	3		—	Pehmee
2022	"Sydän sulaa"	15		1	Pehmee
2022	"Miau" (featuring Theofuego)	19		—	3½ (EP)
2023	"Onnellinen" (with Nelli Matula)	8		—	Pehmee
2023	"Sä <3 Mä"	28		—	Pehmee
2023	"Rovio"	30		—	Pehmee
2025	"Kirsikat"	27		—	Non-album singles
2025	"Tranquilo" (with Juuna Chill)	47		—	Non-album singles
2025	"Jiihaa"	36		—	Non-album singles

==== Featured ====
Year	Artist	Title	Peak position			Album
Year	Artist	Title	FIN Singles	FIN Downloads	FIN Airplay	Album
2014	Aste	"Himalaja"	18	17	—	2.0
2015	JVG	"Takajeejee"	1	2	53	247365
2016	Brädi	"Kombo"	12	5	—	Non-album single
