= Pete Parkkonen =

Finnish singer (born 1990)

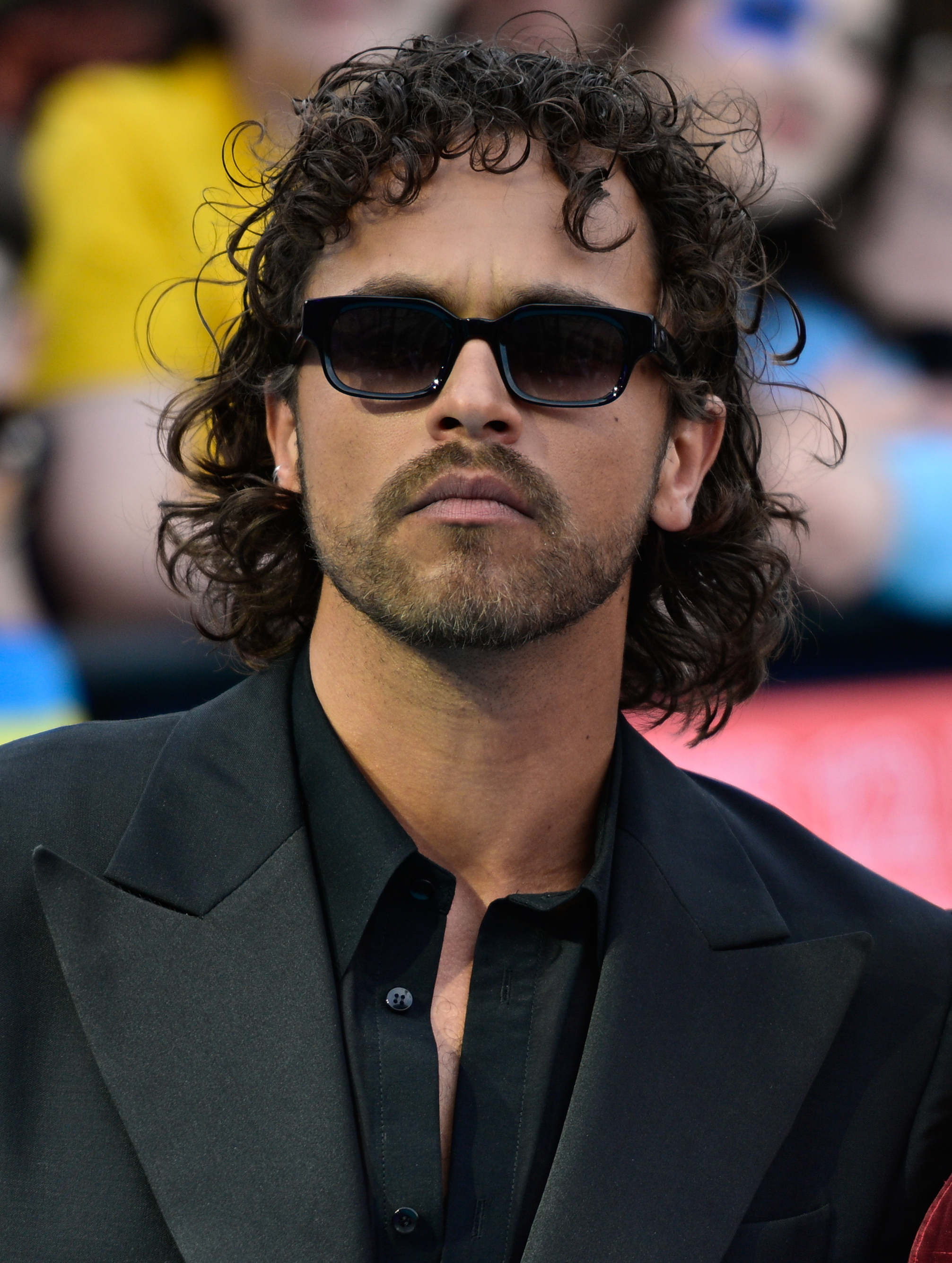
- Parkkonen in 2026

Background information
- Born: Pete Eemeli Parkkonen; 8 February 1990 (age 36); Pihtipudas, Finland
- Genres: Rock; pop
- Occupation: Singer
- Instrument: Vocals
- Years active: 2008–present
- Labels: Sony Music (2008–2011); Warner Music Finland (2012–present)

Pete Eemeli Parkkonen (born 8 February 1990) is a Finnish singer. He took part in the Finnish Idol competition in its fourth season, then launched a solo career, releasing the albums The First Album in 2009 that topped the Finnish Albums Chart followed by I'm an Accident in 2010. He represented Finland in the Eurovision Song Contest 2026 alongside violinist Linda Lampenius with the song "Liekinheitin", finishing 6th in the grand final with 279 points.

== Career ==
=== In Idol ===
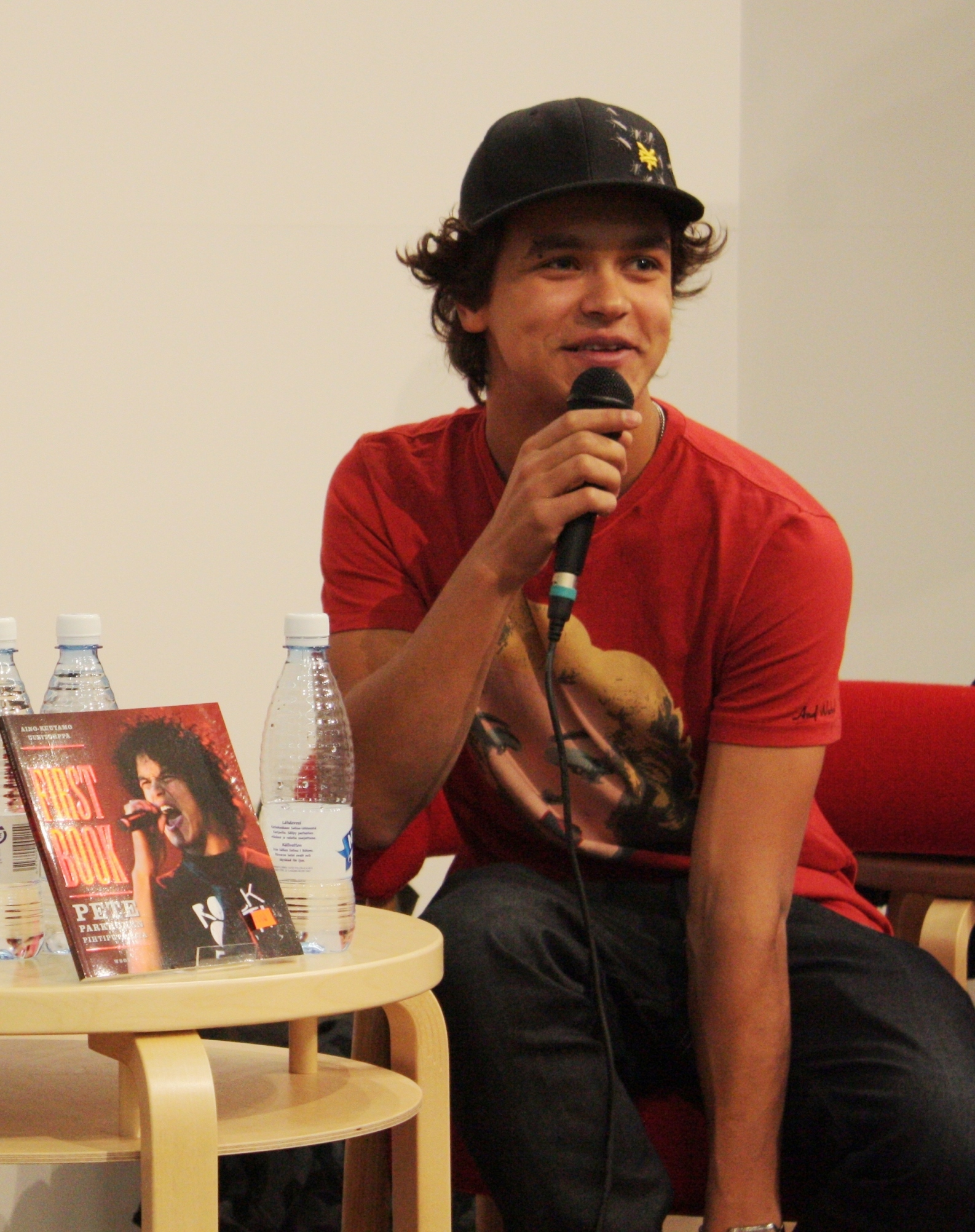
Pete Parkkonen in 2009

Parkkonen auditioned with "Mies jolle ei koskaan tapahdu mitään", a song by J. Karjalainen. During the competition, he interpreted various songs, most notably "Queen City" and "I Kissed a Girl". In the semi-finals, he sang songs from Foo Fighters, Danko Jones and Eppu Normaali making it to the Final 3. The season finals were held on 9 November 2009 with Parkkonen considered the favourite to win. However, he was unexpectedly eliminated in the Final 3 phase finishing third. The grand finale was held on 14 December with Koop Arponen winning the title and Anna Puustjärvi as runner-up.

Parkkonen has also taken part in a number of reality television shows including season 2 of Livenä vieraissa (2009) where he sang "Womanizer" from Britney Spears and "Girl In A Uniform" his single. He also took part in Kuorosota, the Finnish version of Clash of the Choirs and broadcast on Nelonen station, coming second and donating 20,000 Euros to charity.

=== After Idol ===
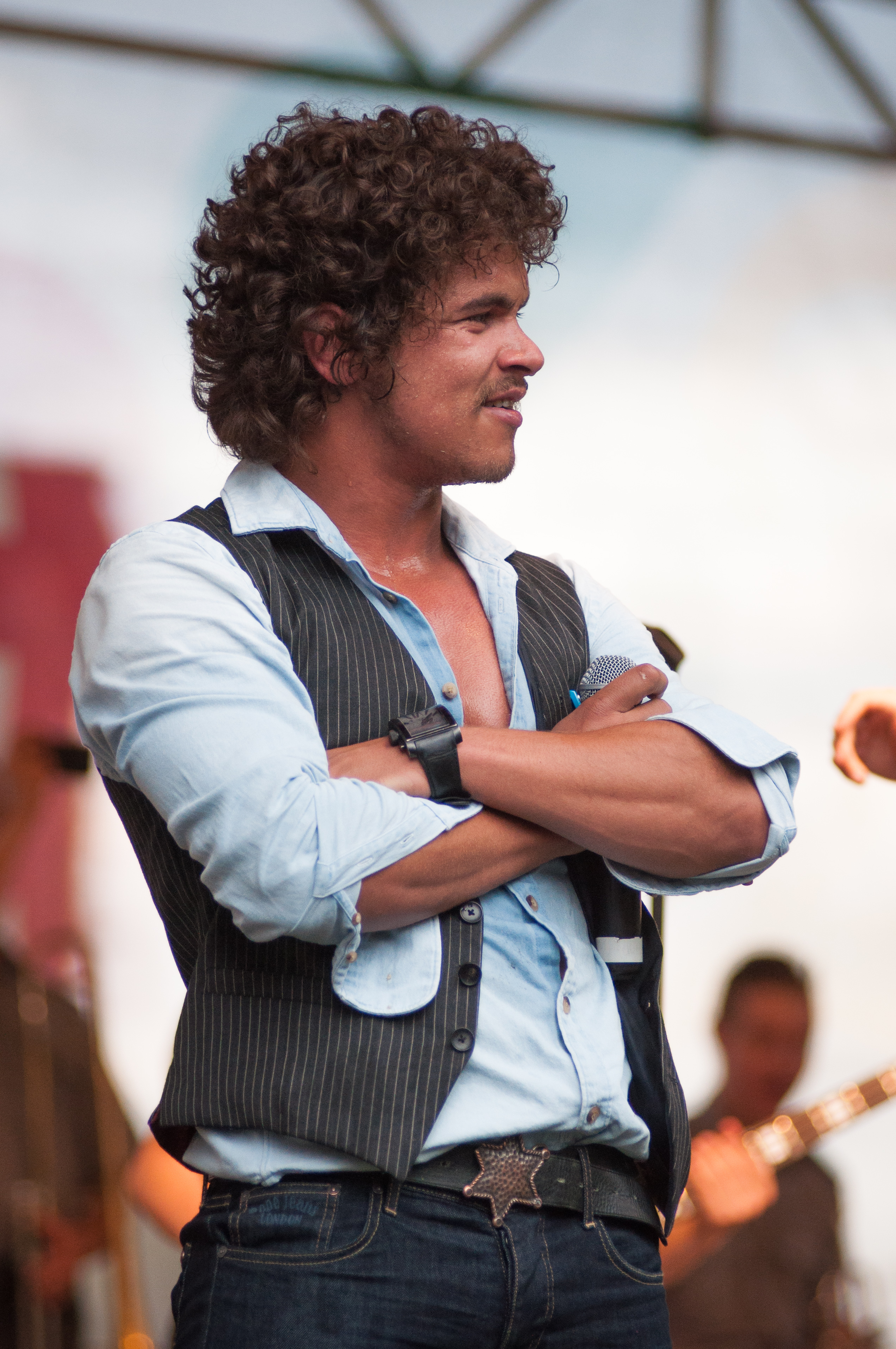
Parkkonen in 2012

After Idol, Parkkonen received a recording contract from Sony BMG and was the first season 4 contestants to release an album. Appropriately titled The First Album, he debuted at number 1 in its first week of release. The album went on to sell just over 24,000 copies and was accredited a gold award. Parkkonen's second studio album, I'm an Accident was released on 18 February 2010, but failed to gain the same commercial success peaking at number 21.

He is preparing a third album in 2014 in Finnish language. Preliminary single releases from the prospective album include "Mitä minä sanoin" and "Mun".

=== Uuden Musiikin Kilpailu ===
Parkkonen won UMK 2026 with violinist Linda Lampenius with the song "Liekinheitin", which received a record breaking 570 points and represented Finland in the Eurovision Song Contest 2026. They placed 6th in the final, earning 279 points.

== Discography ==
=== Studio albums ===
List of studio albums, with selected details and chart positions
Title	Details	Peak chart positions	Certifications
Title	Details	FIN	Certifications
First Album	Released: 5 March 2009; Label: Sony Music; Formats: CD, digital download, streaming	1	IFPI FIN: Gold
I'm an Accident	Released: 15 February 2010; Label: Sony Music; Formats: CD, digital download, streaming	21	
Pete Parkkonen	Released: 25 April 2014; Label: Warner; Formats: CD, LP, digital download, streaming	20	
Pete	Released: 23 November 2018; Label: Warner; Formats: LP, digital download, streaming	8	

=== Singles ===
==== As lead artist ====
Title	Year	Peak chart positions		Album or EP
Title	Year	FIN	SWE	Album or EP
"Girl in a Uniform"	2009	5	—	First Album
"The Final Day"	2009	— (Note: "The Final Day" did not enter the Official Finnish Singles Chart, but peaked at number 21 on the Official Finnish Download Chart.)	—	First Album
"I'm an Accident"	2010	—	—	I'm an Accident
"Mitä minä sanoin"	2013	— (Note: "Mitä minä sanoin" did not enter the Official Finnish Singles Chart, but peaked at number 15 on the Official Finnish Airplay Chart.)	—	Pete Parkkonen
"Mun"	2014	— (Note: "Mun" did not enter the Official Finnish Singles Chart, but peaked at number 14 on the Official Finnish Airplay Chart.)	—	Pete Parkkonen
"Maailma mua vastaan"	2015	— (Note: "Maailma mua vastaan" did not enter the Official Finnish Singles Chart, but peaked at number 64 on the Official Finnish Airplay Chart.)	—	Non-album single
"Mitä mä teen" (featuring JVG)	2016	3	—	Pete
"Kohta sataa"	2016	— (Note: "Kohta sataa" did not enter the Official Finnish Singles Chart, but peaked at number 67 on the Official Finnish Airplay Chart.)	—	Pete
"Ei nyt"	2017	— (Note: "Ei nyt" did not enter the Official Finnish Singles Chart, but peaked at number 66 on the Official Finnish Airplay Chart.)	—	Pete
"Myyty"	2018	14	—	Pete
"Kävi niin kävi näin" (featuring Etta)	2018	—	—	Pete
"Mä haluun sut tänään"	2018	16	—	Pete
"Voimaa ja valoa"	2020	— (Note: "Voimaa ja valoa" did not enter the Official Finnish Singles Chart, but peaked at number five on the Official Finnish Airplay Chart.)	—	Non-album singles
"Portaat"	2020	—	—	Non-album singles
"Täysikuu"	2021	—	—	Non-album singles
"Oon tässä"	2022	—	—	Non-album singles
"Joulurauhaa"	2022	— (Note: "Joulurauhaa" did not enter the Official Finnish Singles Chart, but peaked at number 41 on the Official Finnish Airplay Chart.)	—	Non-album singles
"Liekinheitin" (with Linda Lampenius)	2026	1	96	Non-album singles
"—" denotes a recording that did not chart or was not released in that territory.

==== As featured artist ====
Title	Year	Peak chart positions	Album or EP
Title	Year	FIN	Album or EP
"Sekopää" (Aste featuring Pete Parkkonen)	2011	— (Note: "Sekopää" did not enter the Official Finnish Singles Chart, but peaked at number 22 on the Official Finnish Download Chart.)	Sirkus palaa
"Tuulisii" (JVG featuring Pete Parkkonen)	2015	3	247365
"Me ollaan ne, Pt. 2" (Cheek featuring Nikke Ankara, Elastinen, JVG, Kube, and Pete Parkkonen)	2016	1	Timantit on ikuisia
"Doupein" (Bang for the Buck featuring Pete Parkkonen)	2016	15	Luokkakokous 2 – Polttarit
"Lujaa" (Tippa-T featuring Pete Parkkonen)	2016	20	Non-album single
"Itketään ja nauretaan" (PapiPike featuring Pete Parkkonen)	2019	—	Afrogold
"—" denotes a recording that did not chart or was not released in that territory.

=== Other charted songs ===
Title	Year	Peak chart positions	Album or EP
Title	Year	FIN Digital	Album or EP
"Endless Love Song"	2009	21	First Album

=== Other appearances ===
Title	Year	Peak chart positions	Album or EP
Title	Year	FIN	Album or EP
"Hyvää yötä ja huomenta" (with the Idols 2008 cast)	2009	7	Tähtiluokka
"Come Alive"	2009	—	Tähtiluokka
"I Gotta Feeling" (with Aste, Emma Salokoski, Meiju Suvas, Olli Herman, and Suvi Teräsniska)	2010	—	Kuorosota 3
"Kuuma kesä"	2010	—	Kuorosota 3
"Pläski"	2010	—	Kuorosota 3
"Mikä Boogie" (with Emma Salokoski, Meiju Suvas, Olli Herman, and Suvi Teräsniska)	2010	—	Kuorosota 3
"Etenee" (JVG featuring Pete Parkkonen)	2014	11	Voitolla yöhön
"Se ei oo niin" (JVG featuring Pete Parkkonen)	2017	— (Note: "Se ei oo niin" did not enter the Official Finnish Singles Chart, but peaked at number 43 on the Official Finnish Streaming Chart.)	Popkorni
"Femme Fatale" (Lukas Leon featuring Pete Parkkonen)	2018	—	Simba
"Huoli pois" (JVG featuring Pete Parkkonen)	2019	14	Rata/Raitti
"Uuden edessä" (with various artists)	2020	10	Non-album single
"Let It Be"	2021	—	Laulu Rakkaudelle: Secret; Song Suomi (Season 1)
"Per Vers, taiteilija"	2022	—	Vain elämää (Season 13)
"Syntisten pöytä"	2022	—	Vain elämää (Season 13)
"Pilven pääl"	2022	—	Vain elämää (Season 13)
"Kevät ja minä"	2022	—	Vain elämää (Season 13)
"Loppuun asti" (with Club for Five and Rajaton)	2022	—	Vain elämää (Season 13)
"Lost Boy"	2022	—	Vain elämää (Season 13)
"Pure mua"	2022	— (Note: "Pure mua" did not enter the Official Finnish Singles Chart, but peaked at number 23 on the Official Finnish Airplay Chart.)	Vain elämää (Season 13)
"Tääl on niin kuuma" (with Meiju Suvas featuring Pete Parkkonen)	2022	—	Vain elämää (Season 13)
"Tytär" (with Ujuni Ahmed, Ani, Anna Puu, and Vilma Alina)	2024	—	Non-album single
"Sillat" (with JVG)	2025	2	Unitas Sigma
"—" denotes a recording that did not chart or was not released in that territory.

== Personal life ==
Parkkonen was born into a musical family, and his brother Ville Eetvartti is also a singer. His paternal grandfather was Pierre Rassin, a black French musician from Martinique, who met Parkkonen's paternal grandmother in Äänekoski in 1953 when he worked for the traveling carnival Suomen Tivoli. Parkkonen has spoken openly about the childhood bullying he had experienced because of his dark skin color that he inherited from his father, Kari.

Parkkonen has a son (born in 2015) with singer Johanna von Hertzen, a second cousin of the Von Hertzen Brothers. Parkkonen has stated that his statement in an interview that he easily falls in love with people regardless of gender was incorrectly interpreted as him being bisexual. He clarified that he did not mean love in a sexual attraction sense.

== Notes ==
Awards and achievements
Preceded by Erika Vikman with "Ich komme"	Finland in the Eurovision Song Contest (with Linda Lampenius); 2026	Succeeded by TBD
