= Kiki (singer) =

Finnish singer

- Born: Arja Petra Maria Gavalas; Vantaa, Finland
- Genre: Pop
- Occupation: Singer
- Instrument: Vocals
- Years active: 2021–present

Arja Petra Maria Gavalas, known professionally as Kiki, is a Finnish singer-songwriter. She participated in UMK 2026.

== Background ==
Gavalas was born to a Greek father and Finnish mother in Vantaa. Her brother, Lukas Leon, is a rapper.

== Career ==
In her twenties, Gavalas started her music career by meeting her producer Jimi Pääkallo through her brother, Lukas Leon. With Pääkallo she released her debut single "666" in 2021. "666" placed 8th on Finnish single charts.

In 2022, she released her single "Rodeo". Following the release of "Rodeo", Gavalas was named as one of the YleX breakthrough artists.

In 2023, she released her first album, Intuitio. A track on Intuitio "Jos sul ei oo mua", featured Finnish artists Bess and F.

In 2026, Kiki was announced as a participant for UMK that year with the song "Rakkaudenkipee" ("Lovesick"). In the final, she placed seventh with a total of 42 points. In the same year, she collaborated with Evangelia, Miriana Conte, Dara Ekimova and Lena Zevgara on Evangelia's track Paréa.

== Style and influences ==
Kiki has named artists like Doja Cat, Rihanna, Jenni Vartiainen, Rosalía, Lady Gaga and Michael Jackson as influences and role models for her music. She has also stated that her inspiration comes from multiple genres like Latin music, trap and R&B, along with her Greek and Finnish roots.

== Discography ==
=== Singles ===
- "666" (2021)
- "Rodeo" (2022)
- "Rakkaudenkipee" (2026)

=== Albums ===
- Intuitio (2023)
