= List of number-one albums of 2026 (Finland) =

This is the complete list of number-one albums in Finland in 2026 according to the Official Finnish Charts compiled by Musiikkituottajat. The chart is based on sales of physical and digital albums as well as music streaming.

== Chart history ==
Number-one albums of 2026 in Finland
Week	Album	Artist(s)	Ref.
Week 1	Unitas Sigma	Cheek and various artists	
Week 2	Unitas Sigma	Cheek and various artists	
Week 3	Make Trap Great Again	Jore & Zpoppa	
Week 4	Make Trap Great Again	Jore & Zpoppa	
Week 5	Aris	Ares	
Week 6	Aris	Ares	
Week 7	Aris	Ares	
Week 8	Valoa varten	Kuumaa	
Week 9	Mansion Music	Isac Elliot	
Week 10	Mansion Music	Isac Elliot	
Week 11	Kiss All the Time. Disco, Occasionally.	Harry Styles	
Week 12	Itken jos mua huvittaa	Maustetytöt	
Week 13	Mansion Music	Isac Elliot	
Week 14	Sä olit oikees	Bizi	
Week 15	Sä olit oikees	Bizi	
Week 16	Mansion Music	Isac Elliot	
Week 17	No Haav No Love	Lauri Haav	
Week 18	No Haav No Love	Lauri Haav	
Week 19	Mansion Music	Isac Elliot	
Week 20	Mansion Music	Isac Elliot	
Week 21	Matka mielen ytimeen, Vol. 2	Saimaa	
Week 22	Maailma on mun	Minttu	
Week 23	Mansion Music	Isac Elliot	
Week 24	Mansion Music	Isac Elliot	
Week 25	You Seem Pretty Sad for a Girl So in Love	Olivia Rodrigo	
Week 26	Mansion Music	Isac Elliot	
Week 27	Mansion Music	Isac Elliot	
Week 28	Confessions II	Madonna	
Week 29	Foreign Tongues	The Rolling Stones	
Week 30	No Haav No Love	Lauri Haav	
Week 31	Mansion Music	Isac Elliot	
Week 32	Mansion Music	Isac Elliot	
Week 33	Mansion Music	Isac Elliot	
Week 34	Trapskelmä	Jami Faltin	
Week 35	Mansion Music	Isac Elliot	
Week 36	Pilasit vuodet, pilasit biisit	Helmi Marleena	
Week 37	Pilasit vuodet, pilasit biisit	Helmi Marleena	
Week 38	Mikä muutti kaiken	Ahti	
Week 39	Mikä muutti kaiken	Ahti	
Week 40	Mikä muutti kaiken	Ahti	
Week 41	Herkkisten liiga	Viivi	
Week 42	Herkkisten liiga	Viivi	
Week 43	Netherworlds	Insomnium	
Week 44	Resodance	Turmion Kätilöt	
Week 45	Starseed	Louna0nline	
Week 46	Mansion Music	Isac Elliot	
Week 47	Carnaval de Luz	U2	

== See also ==
- List of number-one singles of 2026 (Finland)
