= Finland in the Eurovision Song Contest 2026 =

- Eurovision Song Contest 2026
- Participating broadcaster: Yleisradio (Yle)
- Country: Finland
- Selection process: Uuden Musiikin Kilpailu 2026
- Selection date: 28 February 2026

Competing entry
- Song: "Liekinheitin"
- Artist: Linda Lampenius and Pete Parkkonen
- Songwriters: Antti Riihimäki; Lauri Halavaara; Linda Lampenius; Pete Parkkonen; Vilma Alina Lähteenmäki

Placement
- Semi-final result: Qualified (3rd, 227 points)
- Final result: 6th, 279 points

Participation chronology

Finland was represented at the Eurovision Song Contest 2026 with the song "Liekinheitin", written by Antti Riihimäki, Lauri Halavaara, Linda Lampenius, Pete Parkkonen and Vilma Alina Lähteenmäki, and performed by Lampenius and Parkkonen themselves. The Finnish participating broadcaster, Yleisradio (Yle), organised the national final Uuden Musiikin Kilpailu 2026 in order to select its entry for the contest.

== Background ==
Prior to the 2026 contest, Yleisradio (Yle) has participated in the Eurovision Song Contest representing Finland fifty-eight times since its first entry in 1961. It had won the contest once in 2006 with the song "Hard Rock Hallelujah" performed by Lordi. In 2025, "Ich komme" performed by Erika Vikman qualified for the final and placed 11th.

As part of its duties as participating broadcaster, Yle organises the selection of its entry in the Eurovision Song Contest and broadcasts the event in the country. Yle had been selecting its entries for the contest through national final competitions that had varied in format over the years. Between 1961 and 2011, a selection show that was often titled Suomen euroviisukarsinta highlighted that the purpose of the program was to select a song for Eurovision. However, since 2012, the broadcaster had organised the selection show Uuden Musiikin Kilpailu (UMK), which focuses on showcasing new music with the winning song being selected as the Finnish Eurovision entry for that year. Yle confirmed its intention to participate at the 2026 contest on 4 December 2025, announcing that its entry would again be selected through Uuden Musiikin Kilpailu; the decision had been delayed as Yle had outlined conditions for its continued participation, which were subsequently addressed and approved following the EBU's general assembly.

== Before Eurovision ==
=== Uuden Musiikin Kilpailu 2026 ===
Uuden Musiikin Kilpailu 2026 was the fifteenth edition of Uuden Musiikin Kilpailu (UMK), the music competition organised by Yle to select its entries for the Eurovision Song Contest. The competition consisted of a final on 28 February 2026, held at the Nokia Arena in Tampere and hosted by Sami Sykkö, Jorma Uotinen and Jasmin Beloued.

==== Competing entries ====
A submission period was opened by Yle which lasted between 18 August 2025 and 24 August 2025. At least one of the writers and the lead singer(s) had to hold Finnish citizenship or live in Finland permanently in order for the entry to qualify to compete. A panel of nine experts appointed by Yle alongside five audience juries selected seven entries for the competition from 491 received submissions, a new record during the current format of the competition. The experts were Tapio Hakanen (Head of Music at YleX), Johan Lindroos (Head of Music at Yle Radio Suomi), Amie Borgar (Head of Music at Yle Svenska), Katri Norrlin (music editor at YleX), Samuli Väänänen (music professional), Pietu Sepponen (promoter at Sunborn Live), Jussi Mäntysaari (Head of Music at Nelonen Media), Stella Kylä-Liuhala (project director of Ohlogy) and Aija Puurtinen (lecturer at Sibelius Academy and UMK vocal coach). The competing entries were announced in a televised show on 14 January 2026, hosted by Mikko Silvennoinen, Eva Frantz, Bess, Samuli Väänänen and Tapio Hakanen, while the music videos for each entry were released between 14 and 22 January 2026.

Artist	Song	Songwriter(s)
Antti Paalanen	"Takatukka"	Antti Paalanen; Heidi Maria Paalanen; Lauri Halavaara; Saara Törmä
Chachi	"Cherry Cake"	Johannes Naukkarinen; Linnea Deb; Olivia Hildén
Etta	"Million Dollar Smile"	Arttu Istala; Emmalotta Kanth; Iiro Paakkari; Kaisa Korhonen; Kyösti Salokorpi
Kiki	"Rakkaudenkipee"	Jaakko Kiuru; Leo Salminen; Niko Salmela; Petra Gavalas
Komiat	"Lululai"	Joni Rahkola; Sampo Haapaniemi
Linda Lampenius and Pete Parkkonen	"Liekinheitin"	Antti Riihimäki; Lauri Halavaara; Linda Lampenius; Pete Parkkonen; Vilma Alina Lähteenmäki
Sinikka Monte	"Ready to Leave"	Florian Spies; Sinikka Monte

==== Final ====
The final took place on 28 February 2026 where seven entries competed. The winner, "Liekinheitin" performed by Linda Lampenius and Pete Parkkonen, was selected by a combination of public votes (75%) and seven international jury groups from Austria, Denmark, Malta, Montenegro, the Netherlands, Spain and the United Kingdom (25%). The viewers had a total of 882 points to award, while the juries had a total of 294 points to award. Each jury group distributed their points as follows: 2, 4, 6, 8, 10 and 12 points. The viewer vote was based on the percentage of votes each song achieved through the following voting methods: telephone, SMS and app voting. For example, if a song gains 10% of the viewer vote, then that entry would be awarded 10% of 882 points rounded to the nearest integer: 88 points. A record total of 446,681 votes were cast during the show: 91,128 votes through telephone and SMS and 355,553 votes through the Yle app.

In addition to the performances of the competing entries, the show was opened by Erika Vikman performing "Father (I Will Never Confess)" and her 2025 Eurovision entry "Ich komme" and 2025 Eurovision winner JJ performing "Wasted Love", while the acts included Sonja Lumme performing her 1985 Eurovision entry "Eläköön elämä", and Ares, Averagekidluke, Elastinen and Turisti performing "Kui paljon".

Final – 28 February 2026
R/O	Artist	Song	Jury	Public vote			Total	Place
R/O	Artist	Song	Jury	Votes	Percentage	Points	Total	Place
1	Komiat	"Lululai"	40	38,414	8.59%	76	116	3
2	Etta	"Million Dollar Smile"	12	15,187	3.39%	30	42	6
3	Kiki	"Rakkaudenkipee"	28	7,146	1.59%	14	42	7
4	Antti Paalanen	"Takatukka"	58	76,829	17.20%	152	210	2
5	Chachi	"Cherry Cake"	32	33,947	7.59%	67	99	4
6	Sinikka Monte	"Ready to Leave"	46	25,907	5.79%	51	97	5
7	Linda Lampenius and Pete Parkkonen	"Liekinheitin"	78	249,248	55.80%	492	570	1

Detailed international jury votes
R/O	Song	United Kingdom	Netherlands	Montenegro	Spain	Malta	Denmark	Austria	Total
R/O	Song	United Kingdom	Netherlands	Montenegro	Spain	Malta	Denmark	Austria	Total
1	"Lululai"	10	6	2	2	10	4	6	40
2	"Million Dollar Smile"			4	4	2		2	12
3	"Rakkaudenkipee"	6	2	6		6	8		28
4	"Takatukka"	8	8	10	10		10	12	58
5	"Cherry Cake"	2	10		6	4	2	8	32
6	"Ready to Leave"	4	4	8	8	12	6	4	46
7	"Liekinheitin"	12	12	12	12	8	12	10	78
International jury spokespersons
United Kingdom – Kabir Naidoo; Netherlands – Eleonora de Jager; Montenegro – Vladana Vučinić; Spain – Mercè Llorens; Malta – Miriana Conte; Denmark – Sissal; Austria – JJ

International jury members
Country	Jury members
Austria	Barbara Stilke; Caro Fux; Herbert Stanonik; Patrick Stelzl
Denmark	Inge Høeg; Mette Helene Christensen; Mike Paudy; Phillip Jensen
Malta	Arthur Caruana; Ian Busuttil Naudi; Julia Cassar; Lyndsay Pace
Montenegro	Antonela Martinović; Bojana Nenezić; Gojko Berkuljan; Ilija Pejović
Netherlands	Eleonora de Jager; Jesse Wijnans; Jordy Sparidaens; Twan van de Nieuwenhuijzen
Spain	Ahmad Halloun; Borja Rueda; Mercè Llorens; Tony Aguilar
United Kingdom	Emma Gale; Kabir Naidoo; Nathan Matthews; Nikki Parsons

==== Broadcasts and ratings ====
The competition was watched by an average of 1.8 million viewers in Finland (0.32 more than in 2025), with a peak viewership of more than 2.5 million, making it the most watched edition of UMK since its establishment in 2012.

Local and international broadcasters of Uuden Musiikin Kilpailu 2026
Country	Broadcaster	Channel(s)	Commentator(s)
Finland	Yle	Yle TV1	Mikko Silvennoinen (Finnish); Eva Frantz and Johan Lindroos (Swedish); Jaakko Oleander-Turja (English); Levan Tvaltvadze (Russian); Galyna Sergeyeva (Ukrainian); Miguel Peltomaa, Silva Belghiti, Jaana Aaltonen and Jarl Hanhikoski (Finnish Sign Language); Maija Lindström (Finland-Swedish Sign Language); Linda Tammela (Northern Sami); Heli Huovinen (Inari Sami)
Finland	Yle	Yle Areena	Mikko Silvennoinen (Finnish); Eva Frantz and Johan Lindroos (Swedish); Jaakko Oleander-Turja (English); Levan Tvaltvadze (Russian); Galyna Sergeyeva (Ukrainian); Miguel Peltomaa, Silva Belghiti, Jaana Aaltonen and Jarl Hanhikoski (Finnish Sign Language); Maija Lindström (Finland-Swedish Sign Language); Linda Tammela (Northern Sami); Heli Huovinen (Inari Sami)
Finland	Yle	YleX	—N/a
Finland	Yle	Yle Radio Suomi	—N/a
Finland	Yle	Yle X3M	Eva Frantz and Johan Lindroos (Swedish)
Netherlands	OutTV (Note: Also available in Belgium, France, Germany, Israel, Spain and Sweden)		Krista Siegfrids

== At Eurovision ==
The Eurovision Song Contest 2026 took place at the Wiener Stadthalle in Vienna, Austria, and consist of two semi-finals held on the respective dates of 12 and 14 May and the final on 16 May 2026. All nations with the exceptions of the host country and the "Big Four" (France, Germany, Italy and the United Kingdom) were required to qualify from one of two semi-finals in order to compete for the final; the top ten countries from each semi-final will progress to the final. On 12 January 2026, an allocation draw was held to determine which of the two semi-finals, as well as which half of the show, each country performed in; the European Broadcasting Union (EBU) split up the competing countries into different pots based on voting patterns from previous contests, with countries with favourable voting histories put into the same pot.

=== Semi final ===
Finland was allocated for the first semi final, and later, was announced to perform in position seven during the show. After the show, Finland were announced as one of the ten qualifiers, therefore, Finland moved on to the final.

=== Final ===
Finland performed 17th, following Satoshi's performance of "Viva Moldova" (representing Moldova) and preceding Alicja's performance of "Pray" (representing Poland), and finished 6th overall with 279 points.

=== Voting ===
==== Points awarded to Finland ====
Points awarded to Finland (Semi-final 1)
Score	Televote	Jury
12 points	Estonia; Sweden	Estonia; Georgia; Portugal; Sweden
10 points		Croatia; Germany; Israel
8 points	San Marino	Montenegro; San Marino
7 points	Poland; Portugal	Greece
6 points	Belgium; Lithuania	Belgium
5 points	Israel; Moldova; Rest of the World; Serbia	Lithuania; Poland
4 points	Georgia; Germany; Italy; Montenegro	Moldova
3 points	Croatia; Greece	Italy; Serbia
2 points		
1 point		

Points awarded to Finland (Final)
Score	Televote	Jury
12 points	Estonia; Sweden	Estonia; Sweden
10 points	Australia; Latvia; Norway	
8 points	Armenia; Azerbaijan; Denmark	Belgium; Denmark; Germany; Norway
7 points		Czechia; Georgia; Israel; Montenegro; Portugal
6 points	Poland	Austria; Croatia; Ukraine
5 points	Luxembourg; Portugal	Lithuania; Malta
4 points	Lithuania; Malta; Moldova; San Marino	Australia; Cyprus
3 points	Belgium; Czechia; Italy; Rest of the World; Switzerland	Latvia; Luxembourg
2 points	Croatia; France; Serbia; Ukraine	Armenia; France; San Marino; United Kingdom
1 point	Albania; Austria; Cyprus; Georgia; United Kingdom	

==== Points awarded by Finland ====
Points awarded by Finland (Semi-final 1)
Score	Televote	Jury
12 points	Estonia	Belgium
10 points	Israel	Croatia
8 points	Serbia	Lithuania
7 points	Sweden	Poland
6 points	Croatia	Israel
5 points	Lithuania	Sweden
4 points	Moldova	Greece
3 points	Portugal	Moldova
2 points	Poland	Montenegro
1 point	Belgium	Portugal

Points awarded by Finland (Final)
Score	Televote	Jury
12 points	Israel	France
10 points	Romania	Denmark
8 points	Denmark	Lithuania
7 points	Bulgaria	Australia
6 points	Sweden	Poland
5 points	Italy	Croatia
4 points	Ukraine	Belgium
3 points	Serbia	Italy
2 points	Croatia	Czechia
1 point	Moldova	Moldova

==== Detailed voting results ====
Each participating broadcaster assembles a seven-member jury panel consisting of music industry professionals who are citizens of the country they represent and two of which have to be between 18 and 25 years old. Each jury, and individual jury member, is required to meet a strict set of criteria regarding professional background, as well as diversity in gender and age. No member of a national jury was permitted to be related in any way to any of the competing acts in such a way that they cannot vote impartially and independently. The individual rankings of each jury member as well as the nation's televoting results were released shortly after the grand final.

The following members comprised the Finnish jury:

- Erno Kulmala
- Ilkka Wirtanen
- Kari Hynninen
- Pauliina Lerche
- Ella Mäntynen
- Marja Kokko
- Sofia Ruija

Detailed voting results from Finland (Semi-final 1)
R/O	Country	Jury									Televote	
R/O	Country	Juror A	Juror B	Juror C	Juror D	Juror E	Juror F	Juror G	Rank	Points	Rank	Points
01	Moldova	11	5	10	1	14	11	8	8	3	7	4
02	Sweden	2	6	7	8	3	6	9	6	5	4	7
03	Croatia	7	1	2	13	1	7	2	2	10	5	6
04	Greece	9	9	3	3	4	13	13	7	4	12	
05	Portugal	10	2	9	7	8	12	11	10	1	8	3
06	Georgia	13	12	14	12	13	14	12	14		14	
07	Finland											
08	Montenegro	5	11	12	11	5	8	5	9	2	11	
09	Estonia	8	3	8	9	9	9	10	11		1	12
10	Israel	6	8	5	2	7	4	3	5	6	2	10
11	Belgium	4	4	1	5	2	3	7	1	12	10	1
12	Lithuania	1	13	6	4	11	1	1	3	8	6	5
13	San Marino	14	10	11	14	12	10	14	13		13	
14	Poland	3	7	4	6	6	2	4	4	7	9	2
15	Serbia	12	14	13	10	10	5	6	12		3	8

Detailed voting results from Finland (Final)
R/O	Country	Jury									Televote	
R/O	Country	Juror A	Juror B	Juror C	Juror D	Juror E	Juror F	Juror G	Rank	Points	Rank	Points
01	Denmark	4	9	4	6	1	14	3	2	10	3	8
02	Germany	16	13	23	17	17	16	19	21		24	
03	Israel	11	4	6	16	7	9	17	12		1	12
04	Belgium	9	11	16	5	6	1	10	7	4	20	
05	Albania	18	24	14	24	16	18	12	20		14	
06	Greece	10	21	21	9	10	8	20	16		15	
07	Ukraine	5	7	13	15	13	17	8	15		7	4
08	Australia	3	5	22	7	4	6	5	4	7	13	
09	Serbia	23	8	12	21	19	24	15	19		8	3
10	Malta	13	17	19	20	21	21	21	22		18	
11	Czechia	6	16	5	14	24	2	22	9	2	19	
12	Bulgaria	19	22	20	3	18	5	7	14		4	7
13	Croatia	1	23	3	4	15	12	13	6	5	9	2
14	United Kingdom	21	14	24	22	23	15	24	24		21	
15	France	8	3	8	1	3	3	6	1	12	12	
16	Moldova	2	15	18	19	2	23	18	10	1	10	1
17	Finland											
18	Poland	15	1	7	11	9	7	4	5	6	17	
19	Lithuania	22	2	2	13	5	13	1	3	8	16	
20	Sweden	7	12	11	8	12	20	2	11		5	6
21	Cyprus	24	20	17	18	22	19	16	23		22	
22	Italy	12	19	1	12	8	4	9	8	3	6	5
23	Norway	14	18	10	10	11	22	11	17		11	
24	Romania	17	10	9	2	14	11	14	13		2	10
25	Austria	20	6	15	23	20	10	23	18		23	
