= Etta (rapper) =

Finnish female rapper

- Born: Emmalotta Amanda Kanth; August 23, 1997 (age 29); Vantaa, Finland
- Origin: Finland
- Genres: Rap, Hip-Hop
- Occupations: Singer; Rapper
- Instruments: Vocals; Flute
- Years active: 2018–present

Emmalotta Amanda Kanth, known as Etta, is a Finnish rapper of Sámi heritage. She participated in UMK 2026 with the song "Million Dollar Smile".

== Early life ==
As a child, Kanth was exposed to music and played the flute. She participated in the Finnish TV show "Talent Suomi" with Aretha Franklin's song "Respect" at age ten. At ten, she was also diagnosed with Alopecia Universalis.

== Career ==
Kanth signed a recording contract with PME Records and Warner Music Finland in 2018. She was a guest on her brother, Lukas Leon's track XTC, which topped the Suomen Virallinen Lista and spent 18 weeks in the top 20. She released her debut single "Ballerina" in the same year.

In 2019, she released her single "Prinsessa", which became her first top 10 single. In the same year, YleX named her as one of the most promising artists of that year. Kanth was also a mentor at a rap camp organized by the record label Monsp and the music publishing house HMC Publishing.

With the release of her first two albums "Tyttö" (in 2021) and "Tykkäät kummiski" (in 2022), she became the first female rapper to two top 10 albums in the Finnish Album Charts. "Tykkäät kummiski" was nominated for the Emma-gaala. In 2024, she released her third album, "Tähtisumua", which reached top 10 and has been streamed platinum. In 2022 and 2024, Kanth was nominated for the Artist of the Year Emma Awards.

In 2026, Kanth was announced as a participant of UMK 2026. She performed her song "Million Dollar Smile" and placed 6th with 42 points in total.

== Discography ==
=== Albums ===
- Tyttö (2021)
- Tykkäät kummiski (2022)
- Tähtisumua (2024)

=== Singles ===
- "Ballerina" (2018)
- "Prinsessa" (2019)
- "Million Dollar Smile" (2026)
