= Ujuni Ahmed =

Finnish journalist

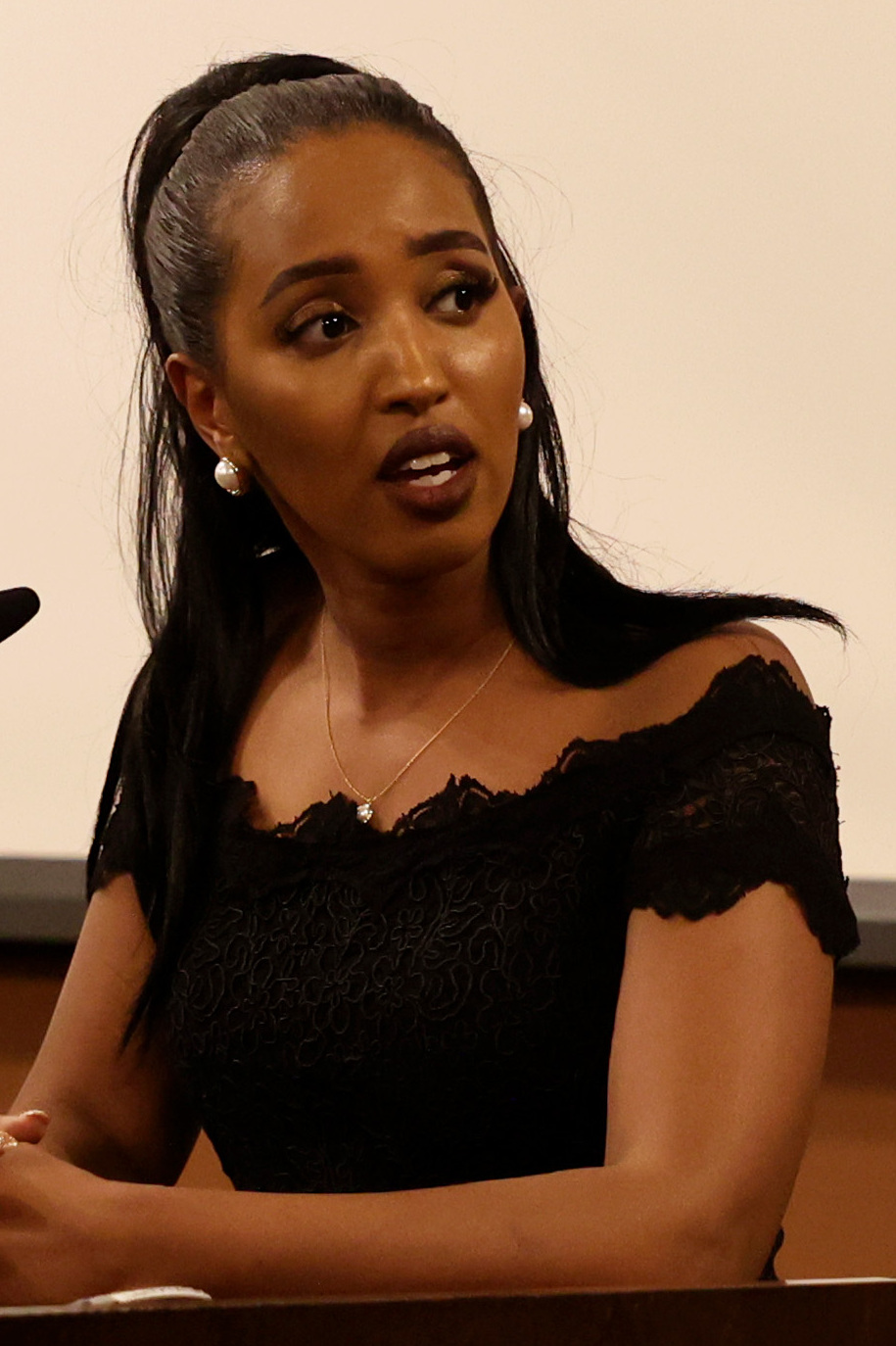
- Ahmed in 2023
- Born: Somalia
- Citizenship: Finnish
- Occupations: Activist, writer
- Years active: 2017–present

Ujuni Ahmed is a Somali-Finnish activist and writer whose work centers on immigrants in Finland.

== Early life and education ==
Ahmed was born in Somalia. At age two, she underwent FGM. She immigrated to Finland with her family in the early 1990s, at age three. She attended comprehensive school in Helsinki. In Finland, Ahmed experienced "quite incomprehensible" racism, and was sometimes driven to and from school despite it being in walkable distance. For her secondary education, she studied practical nursing, a choice she attributes to family pressure, and youth counselling.

== Career ==
In 2017, she became Director of Fenix Helsinki, an organisation which serves immigrant women and children. That year, she appeared on the talk show Enbuske, Veitola & Salminen, hosted by Maria Veitola, as part of a discussion on hijab. The appearance sparked a long-term friendship between Ahmed and Veitola.

In 2020, Ahmed worked for Yle as a news anchor and as a producer of content on the COVID-19 pandemic. She also pitched the idea of presenting news on the pandemic in Somali, allowing broader access to information. While working as an anchor, Ahmed received racist and sexist comments on Twitter, leading her to delete her account. She also received racial epithets on Instagram the following year.

Ahmed is a speaker on immigrant experiences in Finland, and works with young Finnish immigrants. She has also been a vocal critic of FGM and honour killings, for which she received an award from the Finnish Ministry of Education and Culture.

In 2022, she released a book on her experiences in school and her work with young immigrants, titled Tytöille, jotka ajattelevat olevansa yksin. Ahmed also translated the book into Somali. A play based on the book was performed at the Finnish National Theatre.

== Publications ==
- Ahmed, Ujuni; Hirvonen, Elina (2022-05-10). Tytöille, jotka ajattelevat olevansa yksin [For girls who think they are alone] (in Finnish). Werner Söderström Osakeyhtiö. ISBN 9789510468784.

== Awards and recognition ==
- 2020 Finnish PEN freedom of speech award
- 2021 Writer in Residence at the Finnish National Theatre
- 2022 Finnish Prize for Meritorious Artists and Actors, Ministry of Education and Culture
- 2023 Finnish Red Cross Inhimillinen kädenojennus-tunnustus
- 2024 Prize for Development Journalism honorable mention, for the podcast episode "Voiko maailman pelastaa kulutammat?"
