= Linda Lampenius =

Finnish violinist (born 1970)

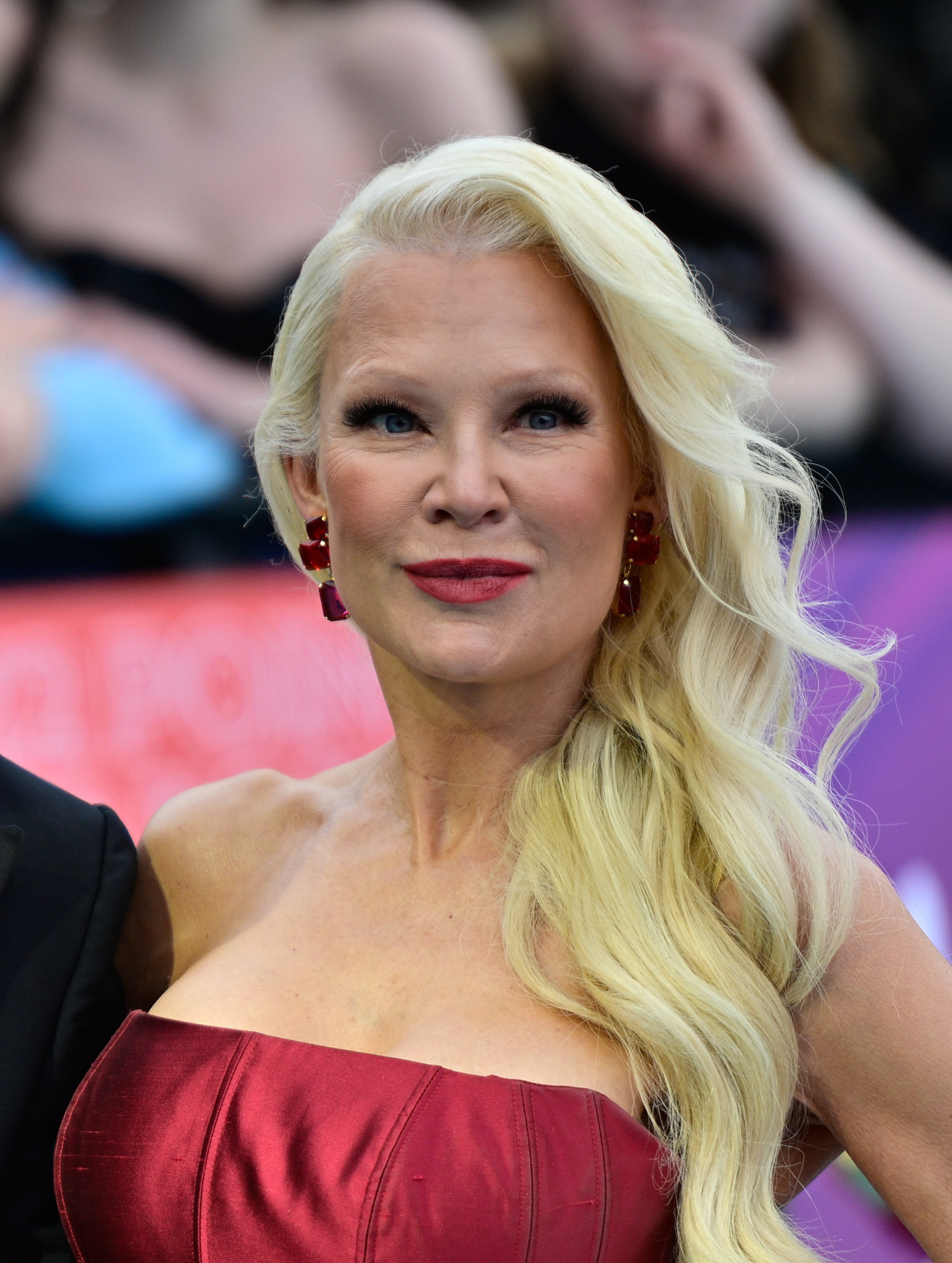
- Lampenius in 2026

Background information
- Born: Linda Magdalena Cullberg Lampenius; 26 February 1970 (age 56); Helsinki, Finland
- Genres: Classical, pop, rock, folk, techno, film, jazz, world, celtic, christmas
- Occupation: Soloist
- Instrument: Violin
- Years active: 1977–present
- Label: Linda Lampenius Productions
- Website: Official website

Linda Magdalena Cullberg Lampenius (born 26 February 1970), previously known internationally by her stage name Linda Brava, is a Finnish classical concert violinist. Born in Finland into a Swedish-speaking Finnish family, she is a dual citizen of Finland and Sweden. Described as one of the most versatile and accomplished players of her generation, Lampenius has also performed pop, rock, folk, techno, film, jazz, and world music, among others. She represented Finland in the Eurovision Song Contest 2026 alongside singer Pete Parkkonen with the song "Liekinheitin", finishing 6th.

== Background ==
Lampenius was born into a Swedish-speaking Finnish family in which music formed a vital part of life. Her father, Börje Lampenius (1921–2016), was a former theatre director, actor, singer, and also a composer of musicals and operettas. Her mother, Ulla Eklund, is a former actress and singer. Both of them worked at the Swedish Theatre in Helsinki.

At age three, Lampenius began to perform with her parents as a singer. Later on, in addition to her solo and orchestral performances, Lampenius would play the violin accompanied by her father on the piano, while her mother sang alongside them. In 1978, Vasabladet reported on Lampenius, a child violinist to remember, after her impressive solo concert appearance.

After leaving Finland in 1997, Lampenius has lived in Los Angeles, London, and Stockholm. She is married to Martin Cullberg, a Swedish defence lawyer, and they have two daughters: Olivia, born 2009, and Cecilia, born 2013. Lampenius's parents-in-law are professor Johan Cullberg and psychotherapist Marta Cullberg Weston. She has been a dual citizen of Finland and Sweden since 2011, when she received Swedish citizenship.

== Early years as a child violinist ==
After attending a musical kindergarten, Lampenius began studying the violin at the age of five, under the guidance of Géza Szilvay, the developer of the Colourstrings method. Lampenius's career then began as a member and soloist of the Helsinki Strings at the age of seven with players two and even three times her age.

Throughout her childhood, Lampenius toured all around the world with the Helsinki Strings, giving concerts in the likes of London, New York City, and Tokyo. As a child violinist, she also appeared on Finnish TV numerous times as part of the artistic-educational TV series Minifiddlers in Musicland on YLE.

In fairly rapid succession, Lampenius was awarded a scholarship by the Swedish Cultural Foundation for being such a promising young violinist, became Concertmistress of the Helsinki Strings, and performed as a soloist of the Radio Symphony Orchestra of Finland at the age of 11. Around the same time, she was also selected for solo roles within the Helsinki Strings, touring among others in England.

== Education and orchestral work ==
Lampenius studied at the Sibelius Academy in Finland from 1985 to 1997, first in the youth department and then the Department of Soloists. She was one of the first students to get into the university based only on one's audition performance. At the Sibelius Academy, Lampenius studied the violin, music theory and history, pedagogy and opera singing, having her own violin students as well. She also played in chamber ensembles, and her Ofelia quartet was chosen to perform in the final concert of the master class course given by the Amadeus Quartet.

Still a student, Lampenius acquired substantial orchestral experience. From 1990 through 1997, she served as Concertmistress of the Conducting Class Orchestra, taught by professors Jorma Panula and Eri Klas. She also served as Concertmistress of the Sibelius Academy Symphony Orchestra on various occasions as well as played the 1st violin in the Finnish National Opera Orchestra for three years, before embarking on a full-time solo career.

In addition to the Sibelius Academy, Lampenius also studied privately with professor Mauricio Fuks in the U.S. as well as took part in numerous master classes in Finland, France, and Israel, including Shlomo Mintz's Keshet Eilon Violin Programme, studying with Shmuel Ashkenasi.

Lajos Garam, former leader of the Department of Soloists at the Sibelius Academy, has said that Lampenius "is a sensitive artistic type and very skillful and experienced as a musician. Her playing is high-quality and full-blooded". For conductor Atso Almila "it was self-evident that she was going to be one of the most notable Finnish violinists." Violinist and pedagogue Päivyt Meller has stated that "Linda is very multiply gifted. She has aberrantly lots of capability of expression, strength and artistry and her playing is technically on quite a high level", while violinist and conductor Ari Angervo has said that Lampenius "just wanted to learn to play as well as possible, to go as deep as possible into music. To my mind she has succeeded in that. Linda is top talented as a violinist." Furthermore, professor Mauricio Fuks has said that "she has a talent for learning and absorbing new things very quickly – Linda is very talented and takes her playing seriously – I am very happy getting to work with a person this sweet. We have been working daily and her playing keeps improving all the time. I would describe Linda as a natural talent, who is at home with the violin."

== Musical career ==
=== Classical music ===
Lampenius has performed chamber music all around Europe, Asia, and the US, working with various pianists, including Timo Koskinen, Folke Gräsbeck, Laura Mikkola, Carina E. Nilsson, Linn Hendry, and John Lenehan. Lampenius has also made many solo orchestral appearances. In addition to Finnish and Swedish city orchestras, she has played with La Scala Opera Orchestra and toured with the City of Prague Philharmonic Orchestra. "She captivated the audience at the Ulriksdal Palace park with passion – The harmonics, the left- and right-hand pizzicato, the ardour in tone, the double stops – it was there", wrote Svenska Dagbladet on her performance of Maurice Ravel's Tzigane with the Stockholm Sinfonietta. Lampenius has also appeared as a soloist of the BBC National Orchestra of Wales and the RTÉ National Symphony Orchestra. In addition to headlining music festivals with José Carreras and Kevin Kenner, Lampenius has also toured with Paul Potts and performed with Andrea Griminelli.

Lampenius moved to Sweden in 2002 and her first major concert tours in the country occurred a few years later. The outcome was successful as critics raved about her talent and she managed to break into the Swedish music scene. "She has been described as a super violinist with Playboy attraction. When Linda Lampenius takes the stage in light blue coverings it is completely without prima donna behaviour. With total stage presence and a bewitched violin she enchants the ears already from the start and there seems to be no end to the applause after the entrance performance" wrote Dalarnas Tidningar while Göteborgs-Posten reported how Lampenius's "music potpourri became a display in virtuoso violin playing" and that "she is undeniably a gifted musician with dazzling technique and a big amount of charm". Lampenius has since participated in various concert tours and given concerts all around the country, performing among others with pianist Robert Wells, soprano Hannah Holgersson, and harpist Monica Ramos.

In addition to Sweden, Lampenius has continued performing internationally as well. Some of her special appearances have included performances for the NATO troops in Kosovo, the Rhapsody in Rock show at the Royal Albert Hall in London, and violin concerts in Astana, Kazakhstan, Irkutsk, Siberia, and the Cannes Film Festival in South of France. Lampenius also performs in corporate events on a regular basis, both in the Nordic countries and elsewhere, including a Ferrari and Maserati event in Moscow.

In 2010, Lampenius performed in the last concert of the RTÉ National Symphony Orchestra's Summer Concert Series, playing works by Turlough Carolan, Michael William Balfe, and Michael McGlynn. She also appeared as a soloist of the Royal Swedish Chamber Orchestra in the grand finale concert of the 40th Annual Royal Palace Music Festival at the Royal Palace of Stockholm. In 2011, Lampenius toured as a soloist of the Schoenbrunn Palace Orchestra Vienna, co-headlining concerts in many of the major concert halls in the Nordic countries such as Finlandia Hall and Stockholm Concert Hall.

With her 1781 Gagliano violin, Lampenius has performed for many heads of state and royals, including the President of Finland, Prince of Monaco, and the Royal Family of Sweden. Lampenius has also played for various European and American politicians, including the United States Secretary of Defense William Perry. Lampenius has also performed for some of the Nobel Prize laureates on the Arctic Circle during festivities marking the 300th anniversary of scientist Carl Linnaeus' birth.

In order to help contribute funds for different charities, Lampenius has performed in numerous benefit concerts over the years. She has played at the 150th Anniversary Gala Concert of the Queen Silvia Children's Hospital in Sweden, for several children's hospitals in Finland, and on behalf of Unicef during the White Turf celebrations on the frozen Lake St. Moritz in Switzerland. Additionally, Lampenius has also performed in gala concerts for the Swedish Childhood Cancer Foundation. Lampenius is also a regular performer in Princess Sofia of Sweden's benefit events that assist underprivileged children in South Africa.

=== Other music ===
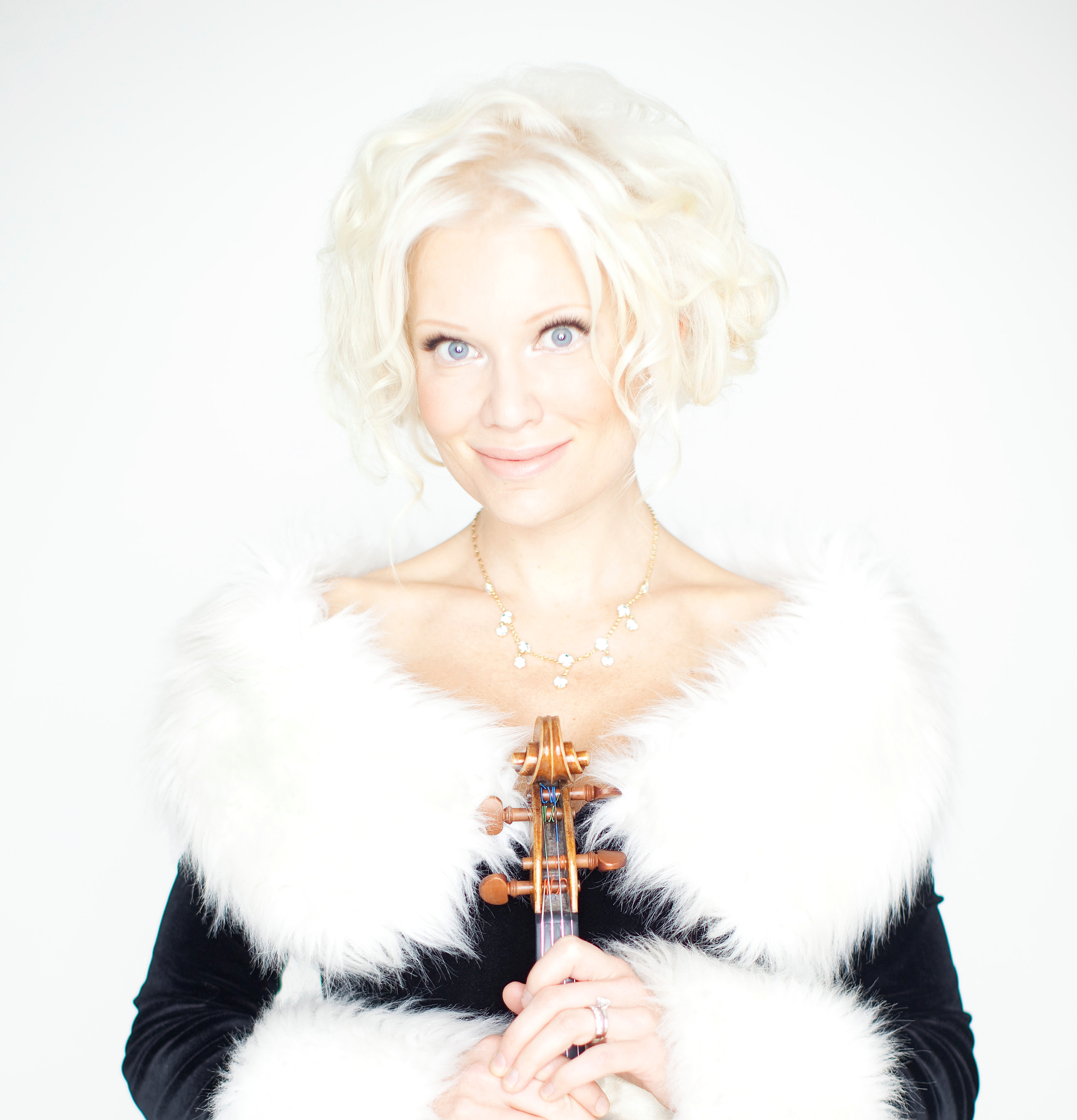
Brava in 2010

=== Pop and rock music ===
Known as a classical violinist, Lampenius was asked to appear on a Finnish television talk show and play a pop version of Johann Sebastian Bach's Toccata and Fugue in fall 1996. Lampenius agreed and was offered a recording contract for pop music with a Finnish record label soon after.

Lampenius's debut album, Linda Lampenius, was released only in Finland, but immediately got international attention as well. After seeing a television profile made of her on British TV and tracking down her musical pedigree, Sir Andrew Lloyd Webber invited Lampenius to take the violin lead in his exclusive rock symphony with Jim Steinman, Metal Philharmonic, that was showcased at the 23rd Sydmonton Festival in Hampshire. The collaboration between Lampenius and Lloyd Webber meant a significant media exposure for her, including the cover story of The Sunday Times Culture supplement. Thereafter, Lampenius became known as the Bach Babe in the United Kingdom tabloids.

Lampenius made some pop rock appearances around Europe and the US, including televised performances at the Royal Albert Hall in London and the Playboy Mansion in Los Angeles. While living in England, Lampenius studied, played, and recorded pop rock music with Dave Gregory (the lead guitarist for XTC), Chris Blackwell (drummer for Robert Plant), and Charlie Jones (bass player for Robert Plant and Jimmy Page), under the guidance of Craig Leon (producer for The Ramones and Blondie), in addition to having her own pop rock band Violators. She also worked with Ofra Haza, with whom she recorded at Abbey Road Studios. Their song "Tarab" is the last recording of Haza, who died soon after.

In 2003, Lampenius starred in her own variety show Fantastix in a Stockholm theatre. The show included her violin playing, acting, dancing, and fire eating. Lampenius has since performed among others with singers Sofia Källgren, Pernilla Wahlgren, and LaGaylia Frazier, in addition to playing with rock and heavy metal bands like Takida and Mustasch. In 2008, Lampenius was one of the leading soloists of the 10th anniversary tour of the Rhapsody in Rock spectacle, which has been staged all around the world, and she was titled as the best artist of the tour, "who awes as usual", by Aftonbladet, the biggest daily newspaper in Scandinavia.

Over the years, Lampenius has also performed in various sports events. She has played in national basketball, football, and ice hockey matches in Finland and Sweden, twice at the ATP Champions event at the Royal Albert Hall in London (televised by the BBC and Eurosport), and for Formula One people in Monaco and Monza. For the 2004 Men's World Ice Hockey Championships in Prague, Lampenius recorded Tre Kronor (Slå Oss Om Ni Kan), the official song for the Swedish National Ice Hockey Team. In the Ericsson Globe, Lampenius has opened up various televised sports events, including K-1 galas, the 2008 GE Galan, and the 2012 Swedish Sports Gala.

Lampenius has also worked as a session musician, playing the violin among others on Celine Dion's album Taking Chances, Sami singer Yana Mangi's Kee Marcello-produced album Earth Shadow, Carola's album Christmas in Bethlehem, and Nanne Grönvall's album My Rock Favorites.

=== World music ===
Lampenius started collaborating with the Irish choral group Anúna in 2006. Their award-winning music special Celtic Origins on PBS has been broadcast on over 250 TV stations in the USA since 2007 and is also available on DVD. According to Nielsen SoundScan, the Celtic Origins album became North America's Bestselling World Music CD for five consecutive weeks in 2007, while the Celtic Origins concert tour in the fall of the same year visited over 40 cities across the United States.

As of 2016, Lampenius has performed with Anúna in concerts in Ireland and Sweden as well. They appeared in the last concert of the RTÉ National Symphony Orchestra's Summer Concert Series in 2010 and performed in Christmas concerts in Sweden in 2011. Lampenius has also recorded for Anúna's other projects, including the 2014 album Illuminations.

=== Christmas music ===
Lampenius has performed in numerous Christmas concerts over the years, most notably headlining Sweden's original Christmas tour Julkonserten both in 2004 and 2008, touring in concert halls and arenas all around the country.

Lampenius has also headlined Christmas concerts in Finland, performing among others at Borgå Cathedral and Temple Rock Church. While living in London, Lampenius played Christmas music in the local Finnish Church.

In 2015, Lampenius performed numerous Christmas concerts in Stockholm, including Immanuel's Church, Hedvig Eleonora Church, and the Finnish Church. She also performed twice at the Gustaf Vasa Church, where one of the concerts were attended by Prince Carl Philip and his wife Princess Sofia of Sweden.

=== Jazz ===
Together with Jeff Goldblum, Lampenius has played and performed jazz music in Los Angeles, in addition to her other jazz performances in New York and Stockholm.

=== Solo albums ===
==== Linda Lampenius ====
Lampenius's pop album Linda Lampenius, which peaked at number 8 on the Finnish Top Album Chart, was released in 1997. Although the album was released only in Finland, Lampenius's single "Violator"/"Toccata and Fugue" got international attention: "Pammi lookalike's great on her Bach" stated the Daily Mirror and the Daily Record wrote that "just when interest in violin music was toning down along comes Linda Lampenius – the fiddling Finn has taken a major bow – she is already a sensation with her version of Bach's Toccata and Fugue". Also The Sunday Times reported how Lampenius "has enjoyed huge success in Scandinavia with an up-tempo version of Bach's Toccata and Fugue". Lampenius has performed material from the album in Finland and abroad, including Sporting Club in Monaco and televised performances at the Royal Albert Hall in London and the Playboy Mansion in Los Angeles.

==== Linda Brava ====
Lampenius was offered a recording contract by EMI in 1997, and she worked under the EMI Classics label from 1998 to 2002. In 1998, Lampenius started recording her first classical album with John Lenehan at Abbey Road Studios in London, and the Linda Brava album was released worldwide in 1999, the track listing including Edvard Grieg's Violin Sonata No. 3 in C minor as well as lyrical violin miniatures by Edward Elgar, Gabriel Fauré, Jean Sibelius, Johann Sebastian Bach-Charles Gounod, Jules Massenet, Niccolò Paganini, and Fritz Kreisler. The album peaked at number 14 on the UK Classical Chart, and Lampenius became the biggest selling Finnish classical artist at the time.

Gramophone described the album as "a delightful recital – played with such warmth, and an eloquent simplicity of line, that the ear is instantly beguiled – a welcome collection". Classic FM Magazine dedicated its cover story for "Linda Brava, Finland's violin sensation", and wrote that she plays "with a pleasant, honeyed tone – making the most of her golden-voiced 1781 Galliano violin – and an unaffected grace that will surely win her many friends". Composer and critic Paul Turok of Turok's Choice thought "the high point of her fine recital disc with pianist John Lenehan is a strong reading of Grieg's Sonata" while the Evening Standard wrote "her best playing comes in the three short pieces by her countryman Sibelius: the skittish Rondino extracts her quickest fingerwork, the Humoreske Op.87 No.1 wins her most tortured expression and the Romance Op.78 No.2 sings under her confident touch". Classic FM UK played music from the album on a daily basis for several weeks, and it was also noted positively by BBC Radio 3 and ABC Classic FM Australia.

With the album release, Lampenius appeared in various newspapers, magazines and TV and radio shows all around Europe and the Far East, being featured on a major poster on the back of a red double-decker bus driving on Oxford Street in London as well. Lampenius's music video for "Ave Maria" was seen on Classic FM TV, and it was also featured in the first edition of Classic FM [2003] DVD. Nowadays, Brava's music video can be seen on C Music TV, which included the video in its August Highlights 2010.

==== Nordic Light ====
Lampenius's third album Nordic Light was released in the Nordic countries in 2005 and re-released in Sweden in 2008, peaking at number 12 on the Swedish Top Album Chart. The album is a collection of folk melodies from Finland and Sweden, also including a medley from the musical Kristina från Duvemåla by Björn Ulvaeus and Benny Andersson of ABBA. Lampenius was inspired to record the album after her two 25-city concert tours in Sweden together with Kalle Moraeus, a former violinist of the Royal Stockholm Philharmonic Orchestra and one of the most sought-after folk musicians in the country. On the critically acclaimed album, Lampenius is accompanied by members of Benny Anderssons Orkester while Anders Ekborg sings on two tracks.

==== Angels ====
Lampenius's latest album Angels is a collection of Christmas carols from Finland, Sweden, Germany, France, England, and the United States, arranged for solo violin, string quartet, harp, and female choir, in addition to numerous guest artists such as guitarist Ulf Wakenius, trombonist Nils Landgren, and soprano Sofia Källgren.

The album peaked at number 3 on the Swedish Classical Album Chart, and includes classics like "Angels We Have Heard on High", "Away in a Manger", "Ding Dong Merrily on High", "O Holy Night", "Panis angelicus", and "Silent Night". Angels is the first album released through Lampenius's own record label Linda Lampenius Productions, although, the album is distributed by Naxos Records. It is also Lampenius's first Christmas release.

The album was produced by Lampenius herself and Lars Nilsson, who also produced Crown Princess Victoria of Sweden and Prince Daniel's wedding album. The arrangers include Swedish composers Paula af Malmborg, Olov Helge, and Dan Evmark as well as a Norwegian composer Tormod Tvete Vik. The featured string quartet is Hvila from the Gothenburg Symphony, and the female choir is Leif Strands Damkör from Gothenburg as well. The harpist Delphine Constantin is from France.

Released in Finland and Sweden, Angels got warm reviews in various publications. Göteborgs-Posten wrote that Lampenius is "a good soloist", who "approaches her music with devotion", and the critic was especially "fascinated by the strong, melancholic Finnish Christmas song 'Sylvian joululaulu' ('Sylvia's Christmas Song')". Hallands Nyheter positively declared that "musically, the outcome sounds more like a concert recording", and Västerbottens-Kuriren described the album as "beautiful, caressing and enjoyable, soothing and pleasant", while Hufvudstadsbladet stated that Lampenius is "a divinely gifted violinist" and "the performances are high-class". Furthermore, Rondo-Classica, the biggest classical music magazine in the Nordic countries, thought the album is Lampenius's "best release so far – She plays convincingly. The tone of her Gagliano violin has become more beautiful, and her pretty straightforward phrasing is completed well by the clang of the harp and the angelic voices of the female choir." Lampenius promoted the album in Finland and Sweden with numerous television and radio appearances, newspaper and magazine articles, and promotional performances.

== Other careers ==
=== Modelling ===
Lampenius attended a modelling school and came 2nd in a major modelling competition in Finland in 1988, appearing in a few fashion shows and a televised coffee commercial. She was also asked to participate in Miss Finland beauty pageants several times, but refused, because she wanted to concentrate on her playing.

In 1996, both Björn Borg and Panos Emporio offered Lampenius a modelling contract, and she became the spokesperson for the Björn Borg fashion label, appearing in advertisements, fashion shows, and other promotional events in Finland, Sweden, and England from 1996 through 1999. Especially the Björn Borg fashion shows, some of which were also televised, became popular, and Lampenius drew international media attention as she was playing the violin while modelling swimsuits on catwalks. The shows became so popular that when Lampenius performed in the NK Stockholm for the first time, there was a queue outside and some people were unable to see the show. Lampenius's televised performance at the Royal Albert Hall in London in the middle of the 1st ATP Masters tournament between Björn Borg and John McEnroe made also headlines, and the picture of her in a tiny black, figure-hugging lycra outfit and red faux fur moon boots was prominently featured in the papers the following days.

The Swiss watch manufacturer Maurice Lacroix engaged Lampenius to promote their Calypso range of watches in England in 2000. In addition to editorial shoots and posters, Lampenius also played in various Maurice Lacroix events, including at Mandarin Oriental Hyde Park.

Over the years, Lampenius has also modelled in many magazines, including Café, Elle, Esquire, GQ, Hello!, Maxim and Playboy.

=== Acting ===
Lampenius appeared in the Finnish film classic Akseli and Elina in 1970 at only eleven weeks of age; her mother played the lead and she was her daughter-in-arms. Throughout her childhood, Lampenius had small roles among others in productions of the Swedish Theatre, touring in Sweden and Norway with the theatre company as well. Since the 1990s, Lampenius has appeared in a few Finnish and Swedish TV series, including Kadonnut näky, Uuno Turhapuro, and Cleo. Lampenius has also starred in the Finnish comedy television series Kultajukka & kumppanit on YLE. Among her other roles on the show, she parodied her own public image in Finland, playing the "Media Linda", a stupid blonde, who carries a violin and invades everywhere in little outfits.

While living in Los Angeles, Lampenius was offered roles in Fame L.A., Melrose Place, and Baywatch, and she was also asked to star a television talk show as its musical guest host. Lampenius refused to sign any long-term contracts, but agreed to appear in one episode of Fame L.A. as a guest star, playing Ilsa Lundqvist, a Swedish violinist, who ends up playing the violin at a Christmas party of an art school, having one of the students fall in love with her. After months of persuading by Douglas Schwartz, Lampenius also agreed to appear in one episode of Baywatch, in which she portrayed Ariana, a European violinist in trouble. Both of the shows used music from Lampenius's pop album, including pieces "Violator" and "Aquamarine".

=== Politics ===
Lampenius represented the Swedish People's Party and was elected to the Helsinki City Council for a four-year term in 1996, serving also as a board member of the Helsinki Philharmonic Orchestra. In 1997, Lampenius was titled as Finland's Tourist Envoy in Sweden as she had increased Swedes' interest in Finland.

=== Entrepreneur ===
Lampenius had her own cider brand, Linda Cider, in the Nordic countries between 1997 and 2000, selling over 12 million bottles in two years. To support the cider sales, Lampenius had a calendar for 1998 and, every now and then, she would travel all around the country by helicopter, visiting several major supermarkets in one day, giving autographs and posing for pictures.

As of 2016, Lampenius has designed her own sofa, Nordic Symphony, which is being sold though C/O Home in Sweden.

=== Author ===
Lampenius's autobiography, Linda, was published by WSOY in Finland in 2003. In her book, Lampenius talks openly about her upbringing, demanding violin training, tours around the world, years of success, and severe personal struggles, including low self-esteem, unhealthy relationships, legal battles against her former American manager and his millionaire friend, depression and eating disorders.

Over the years, Lampenius has also published some of her diary entries and short stories in Finnish newspapers. As a blogger, Lampenius has written about her life and career and other things on the official websites of Swedish Mama (2010–2012) and Kurera magazines (2012–2015). She has also held her own blog site on lindalampeniusblogg.wordpress.com.

Lampenius suffered from anorexia, orthorexia, and bulimia for over 20 years, and has openly spoken about the issues in the media and as a public speaker. During the 2010s, Lampenius worked on her memoirs where she discusses her eating disorders, among other things. The book, Klassisk rebell, is published in October/November 2021 in Swedish language and, simultaneously, in Finnish translation.

=== Sports ===
Lampenius got her rally licence in the 1990s, and has since raced Sports 2000 series cars and worked as a co-driver in rally competitions in Finland, in addition to having her own kart racing team. She has also worked as a commentator for Nordic TV channels during ice hockey and Formula One meets in Europe. As for other sports, Lampenius has gone in for alpine skiing (naming Madonna di Campiglio, Courchevel and Åre as her favorite skiing resorts), boxing, and scuba diving, also practicing archery in Israel. In 2008, Lampenius trained Muay Thai in Thailand and made a PR video for the Fairtex Bangplee training camp.

Lampenius has also learnt ballroom dances as she participated in Let's Dance (the Swedish version of Dancing with the Stars) on TV4 in 2008. Lampenius and her dance partner Daniel da Silva won several rounds of the competition but, after an injury, came 6th out of 12.

== Media ==
Lampenius first came into the public spotlight as a child violinist, performing on Finnish TV in the 1970s and 1980s and being featured in Finnish newspapers, in addition to concert tours all around Europe, the US, Canada, and Japan. Lampenius has always been open about her personal life, and especially the Finnish media has been covering this field of her life in detail throughout the years.

Since 1997, Lampenius has been featured in numerous TV programmes all around the world. Channel 4's television profile about her has been aired all around Europe and Japan, while the Inside Edition profile on CBS was broadcast in the USA. Lampenius has also starred in a music special on Rai Uno, the biggest TV channel in Italy, and the concert was broadcast in 160 countries worldwide, while her solo orchestral appearance with the BBC National Orchestra of Wales was televised for Britain. In 2007, Lampenius appeared as a violin soloist in Anúna's Celtic Origins music special on PBS, which aired the show on over 250 TV stations across the USA. Brava has also been featured in news programmes on ABC, the BBC, CNBC, CNN, and Fox News Channel, including shows like BBC Breakfast and The O'Reilly Factor, which is the most-watched cable news show in the USA. Lampenius has also been featured in light entertainment shows, including on E! Entertainment. With her classical album release, Lampenius visited several TV shows in Europe and the Far East, playing classical music for 200 million TV viewers at one time.

As for publications, Lampenius has been featured in the cover stories of The Sunday Times, Classic FM Magazine, Playboy, and many others. Both American Elle and Details chose Lampenius as the Best Newcomer in Music in 1998, and she has since been featured in numerous other fashion, lifestyle, and entertainment magazines as well, including Entertainment Weekly, Esquire, GQ, Hello!, Maxim, and Vogue. The Times has stated her to be "the gifted Finnish classical violinist", who is "brilliant" and "acclaimed by critics", while The Sunday Times stated "she plays like Nigel Kennedy". Lampenius has also been called "a striking Finnish blonde with impeccable musical credentials" by the Los Angeles Daily News and "Finnish Phenom" by the New York Post. Additionally, she has been called a "virtuoso violinist" by both The Guardian and The Independent.

In 2010, Lampenius was one of the judges of the 1st season of X Factor in Finland, a singing competition based on Simon Cowell's The X Factor franchise.

== Personal life ==
In a newspaper interview in February 2019, Lampenius said that she suffers from familial hypercholesterolemia, which she had been diagnosed with as a child.

== Filmography ==
Year	Title	Role
1997	Fame L.A.	Dagmar
1999	Baywatch	Ariana

== Awards ==
Lampenius has received the Stockholm Culture Awards medal for violin.

Awards and achievements
Preceded by Erika Vikman with "Ich komme"	Finland in the Eurovision Song Contest (with Pete Parkkonen); 2026	Succeeded by TBD
