= Monica Ramos =

Monica Ramos is a Chilean-born Swedish harpist.

== Biography ==
Monica Ramos is a graduate of the Royal College of Music in Stockholm and has performed in the Royal Stockholm Philharmonic Orchestra, the Radio Symphony Orchestra of Sweden and the Swedish Chamber Orchestra. Ramos has released three solo albums, and has sold several hundred thousand albums in over forty countries.

== Albums ==
=== Wind from the sea ===
The album "Wind from the sea" (1993) was her first release, mixing symphonic harp with ambient modern rhythms. The album has some new compositions and some older repertoire.

=== Moai ===
"Moai", released in 1997, was her follow-up to "Wind from the sea" and has sold more than 250,000 copies. On some tracks, like "Eternidad (The eternity)", she is also accompanied by her brother Alvaro Covarrubias, a classical guitarist.

=== Behind That Light ===
"Behind That Light" was released in 2001; apart from two tracks, all the music and lyrics were written by Ramos herself. The tracks span from rhythmic melodies like "Para un angelito" and "Ya te vas" to classical pieces like "Creo" and "Mami". It was nominated ninth place in the US based New Age Voice Magazine.
