= Nelli Matula =

Finnish singer

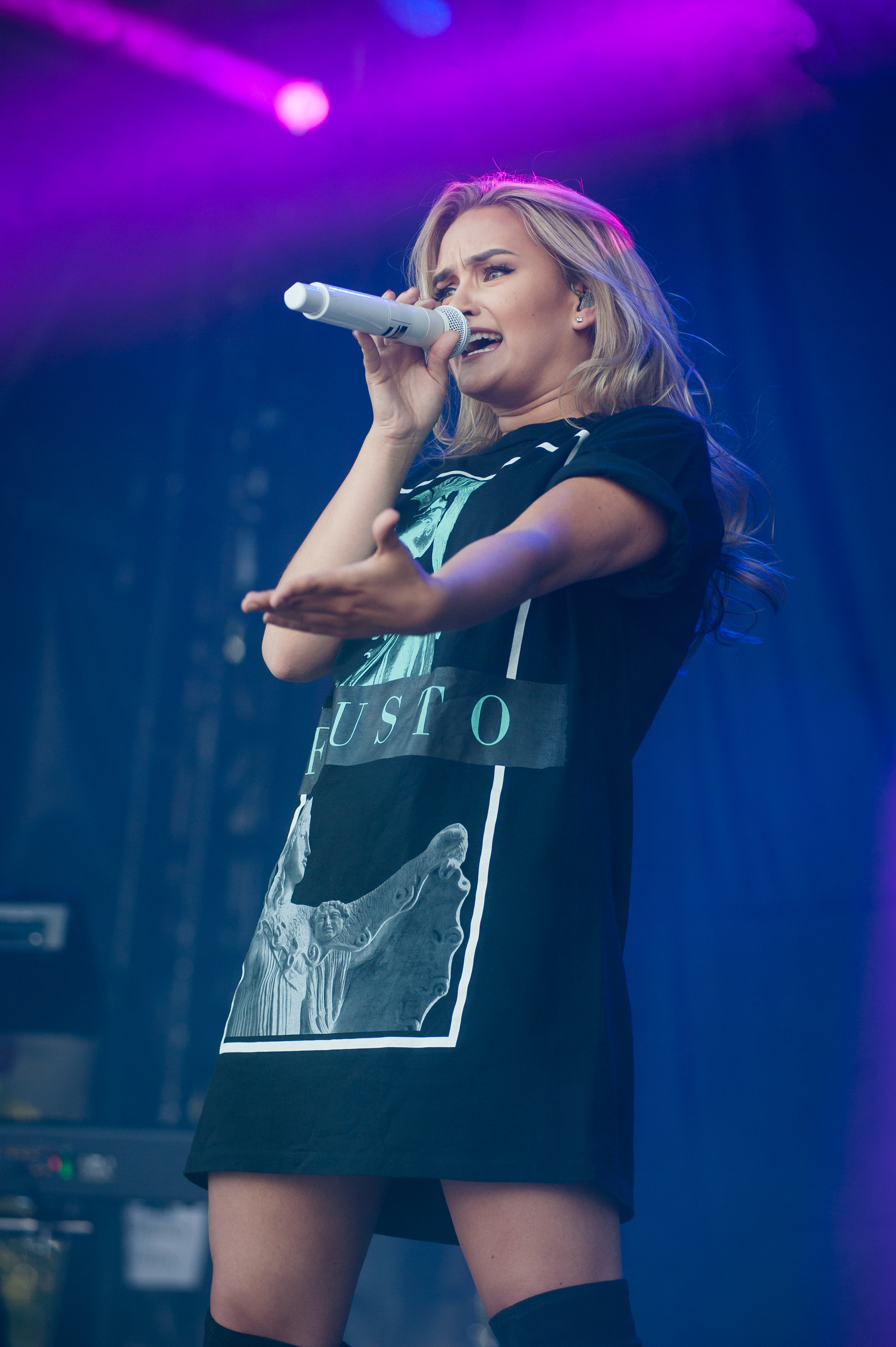
- Matula in 2018

Background information
- Born: December 18, 1995 (age 30); Espoo, Finland
- Genre: Dance-pop

Nelli Matula (born December 18, 1995) is a Finnish singer in the dance-pop genre. She has charted many times in the official Finnish Charts. She participated in Uuden Musiikin Kilpailu 2025, where she ultimately placed 4th.

== Biography ==
Matula was born in Espoo, and during her time in school participated in a role in Mary Poppins at the Helsinki City Theatre. She was also an exchange student in Switzerland. She has stated that one Christmas, she received a record player which became her favorite item.

She first became known for her appearance in Finnish T.V. show Tähdet, tähdet in 2017, where she was the youngest contestant and was eliminated in the sixth episode. That same year, she was nominated for the Emma Award for Rookie of the Year.

Her first album, released in 2019, was certified platinum. Her second, released in 2022, was certified gold prior to its release due to early streaming.

In April 2023, she cancelled all of her concerts, citing a cycle of illness and stating that her body had been pushed too hard. She subsequently went on a vacation somewhere warmer. She also stated that she received fantastic health care from doctors in Finland. That same year, she stated that many scammers had pretended to be her.

She participated in Uuden Musiikin Kilpailu 2025 with her song Hitaammin Hautaan, described as a "featherlight pop banger" by Music Finland. The song's English title is Slower to the Grave. She placed fourth in the final. However, the song became the most played song of 2025 in Finland and charted for 20 weeks on the Official Finnish Charts for Singles.

In 2026, she headlined Kangasala's Harjufest.

She shares a dog with fellow Finnish singer Elias Kaskinen.

She has been nominated for multiple Emma Awards.

== Discography ==
Albums
Album	Publisher	Year	Highest Chart Position on the Official Finnish Charts	Number of Charting Weeks
Kiltti Tyttö	Universal Music Finland	2022	2	21
Jumalatar	Universal Music Finland	2019	6	14

Singles (Note: For all songs that charted on the Singles chart, they will be listed based on their placement on the Singles chart. Songs which did not chart on the Singles chart will have a note confirming what chart and what position they reached.)
Song	Year	Highest Chart Position on the Official Finnish Charts Singles Chart	Number of Weeks
Mun vuoro luovuttaa	2026	27	1
PETSHOP (with Senya and Olga)	2026	7	5
Uus ikuisuus	2025	25	2
Roskat (with Sara Siipola)	2025	21	1
Hitaammin hautaan	2025	2	20
Sä Voitit Jo	2024	30	2
Skorpioni	2023	31	1
Onnellinen (Evelina ft. Nelli Matula)	2023	8	7
Ojaan	2022	14	3
Kiltti Tyttö	2022	12	3
Vegasissa Naimisiin (ANI ft. Nelli Matula)	2022	18	1
Limbo	2022	10	4
Levoton Tyttö (ABREU ft. Evelina, Nelli Matula)	2021	4	5
Tulevaisuuteen	2021	15	4
Lelu	2021	6	4
Kato	2020	9	5
Tikkei	2020	18	1
Sukupuuttoon	2020	8	4
Koske	2019	5	4
Helposti Särkyvää	2019	7	3
Tää Ei Oo Ohi	2017	8	1
EYO (Profeetat ft. Nelli Matula)	2017	1	7
Hula Hula (with Robin Packalen)	2017	5	17
Mun Kaa Kahden	2017	N/A (Note: Did not chart on the Singles chart, but reached #43 on the Streaming chart.)	1
Lemmikki	2016	N/A (Note: Did not chart on the singles chart, but reached #29 on the streaming chart)	7
Kato Vaan	2016	N/A (Note: Kato Vaan did not chart on the Singles chart, but reached #43 on the Streams chart)	2
