= Sara Siipola =

Finnish singer (born 1997)

- Born: 24 March 1997 (age 29); Laihia, Finland
- Genres: Pop; Soul
- Occupations: Singer; Songwriter
- Years active: 2017–present

Sara Maria Tuulikki Siipola (born 24 March 1997) is a Finnish singer and songwriter. She signed a recording contract with Sony Music in 2019 and released her first single "Rohkee sydän" in September 2019. Siipola rose to fourth place in YleX's Läpimurto 2020 list.

Siipola has released the singles "Rohkee sydän", "What I'm Doing Here", "You're Not Mine Anymore", "Thelma & Louise", "Kokonaan" and "Peto". Siipola is a guest artist on Aste's single "Kuka suojelee sua".

Siipola released her debut album Kaunis kun itken on 26 March 2021. The genres of the album are soul and pop.

== Early life ==
Siipola was born in Laihia in 1997. She was diagnosed with ADHD in 2017.

== Career ==
In 2017, Siipola signed an artist contract with M-Eazy Music and a manager contract with Hannu Sormusen's Aspen Music. In 2019, she also signed a recording contract with Sony Music. Released in autumn 2019, the debut single "Rohkee såðin" went directly to the top 100 of the Spotify list and entered the playlists of YleX and Radio Suomen. The song was also heard as part of the advertising campaign of the Toisenlaiset teiniäidit program in the spring of 2020. "Brave heart" won the Radio Suomen Levylautakuna vote in October 2019.

Siipola's second single "What Am I Doing Here" also made it onto YleX's playlist. The third single "Sä et oo no longer mulle se" rose to number 78 on the Spotify list and on Radio Suomen's playlist. In November 2020, Siipola performed at Yle's Nenäpäivä concert. Sara Siipola competed in the seventh season of the Tähdet, tähdet program, which would be released in spring 2023 on Nelonen. Siipola's single "Susta tulle tähti" reached number 47 on Finland's Official Singles List.

Siipola participated in the Uuden Musiikin Kilpailu 2024, the Finnish selection for the Eurovision Song Contest 2024, with the song "Paskana". "Paskana" reached the second place on the Singlelista and the 24th place on the Radiolista.

Siipola competed in MTV3's Tanssii tähtien kanssa in autumn 2025. She was first eliminated.

== Discography ==
=== Studio albums ===
List of studio albums, with selected details
Title	Details	Peak chart positions
Title	Details	FIN
Kaunis kun itken	Released: 26 March 2021; Label: Sony Music Entertainment Finland; Format: Digital download, streaming	49
Sanon sen nyt ääneen	Released: 8 November 2024; Label: Sony Music Entertainment Finland; Format: Digital download, streaming	7

=== Singles ===
==== As lead artist ====
Title	Year	Peak chart positions	Album or EP
Title	Year	FIN	Album or EP
"Rohkee sydän"	2019	—	Kaunis kun itken
"Mitä mä täällä teen"	2019	—	Kaunis kun itken
"Sä et oo enää mulle se"	2020	—	Kaunis kun itken
"Thelma & Louise"	2020	—	Kaunis kun itken
"Kokonaan"	2020	—	Kaunis kun itken
"Paha kiertämään"	2022	—	Non-album singles
"Ferrari"	2023	—	Non-album singles
"Susta tulee tähti"	2023	47	Sanon sen nyt ääneen
"Uusi musta"	2023	—	Non-album single
"Paskana"	2024	2	Sanon sen nyt ääneen
"Juostaan" (featuring Sexmane)	2024	1	Sanon sen nyt ääneen
"Rakasta mua, rakasta mua, rakasta"	2024	10	Sanon sen nyt ääneen
"Viimeinen tekoni"	2024	43	Sanon sen nyt ääneen
"Haluun elää"	2025	39	Non-album single
"—" denotes a recording that did not chart or was not released in that territory.

==== As featured artist ====
Title	Year	Album or EP
"Kuka suojelee sua" (Aste featuring Sara Siipola)	2020	Everyday Porrada
