= Aste (rapper) =

Finnish rapper

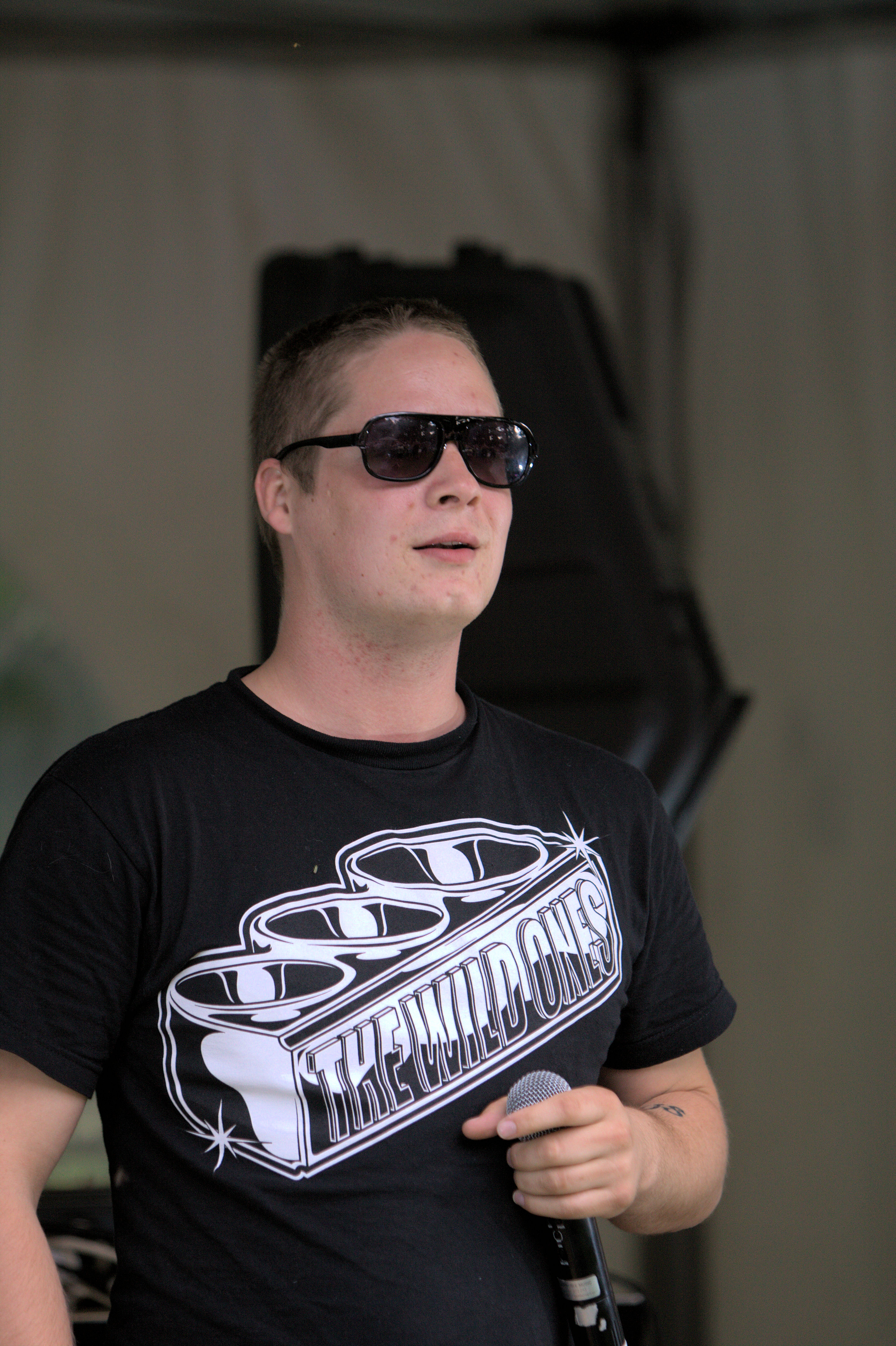
- Aste in 2011

Background information
- Also known as: Asteriks
- Born: Jani Tapani Sutelainen; 24 June 1985 (age 41)
- Origin: Kuusankoski, Finland
- Genre: Rap
- Years active: 2000–present

Jani Tapani Sutelainen (born 24 June 1985), professionally known as Aste (in English Degree) and previously as Asteriks, is a Finnish rapper who has labeled his music as "crime-pop". He has released six solo studio albums and appeared as a featured guest on songs by such artists as Pyhimys and Antti Tuisku.

== Selected discography ==
=== Solo albums ===
| Year | Title | Peak position |
| Year | Title | FIN |
|---|---|---|
| 2008 | AD/HD | – |
| 2009 | Surullisiilauluja | 16 |
| 2010 | Nuorallatanssija | 43 |
| 2012 | Sirkus palaa | – |
| 2015 | 2.0 | 7 |
| 2018 | Grand Prix | 11 |

=== Singles ===
| Year | Title | Peak position | Album |
| Year | Title | FIN | Album |
|---|---|---|---|
| 2009 | "Poikkeus sääntöön" | 2 | Surullisiilauluja |
| 2010 | "Normipäivä" | 11 | Nuorallatanssija |
| 2013 | "Spaceman" | 6 | 2.0 |
| 2014 | "Only One" | 13 | 2.0 |
| 2015 | "Himalaja" | 17 | 2.0 |
| 2015 | "Apinalauma" | 18 | 2.0 |
| 2016 | "Peruskallio" | 3 | Grand Prix |
| 2016 | "Enemmän kuin valmis" | 18 | Grand Prix |
| 2017 | "Luonasi" | 20 | Grand Prix |
| 2017 | "Monaco" | 5 | Grand Prix |
| 2018 | "Vastaaja" (with Mira Luoti) | 17 | Grand Prix |
| 2022 | "Mikä-Mikä-Maa" (featuring Eme) | 19 | Non-album singles |
| 2023 | "Köyhä laulaa" (featuring Diandra) | 7 | Non-album singles |
| 2025 | "André" (featuring Kerkkogabriel) | 24 | Non-album singles |
