= Bess (singer) =

Finnish singer (born 1993)

BESS
- Born: Essi Miia Marianna Launimo; 22 April 1993 (age 33); Finland
- Genres: Pop, electro, house
- Years active: 2017–present
- Label: Universal Music

Bess Essi Miia Marianna Launimo (born 22 April 1993), known professionally as BESS (stylized in all caps), is a Finnish singer. She combines pop, electro and house in her music. Bess makes music together with her producer Nopsajalka.

Bess has a double degree in hairdressing and has also studied as a professional musician at the Pop & Jazz Conservatory in Oulunkylä, Helsinki.

Bess' debut singles were released in 2017, with the track "Tempo" being particularly successful. At its peak, it ranked third on the official download list in Finland and 13th on the singles list. It has been listened to more than 10 million times, which is enough to justify a double platinum record. In total, BESS' music has already been listened to more than 55 million times.

Bess' self-titled debut album was released in November 2019, surpassing the number of listens required for a gold record even before its release. Bess entered the 2022 Uuden Musiikin Kilpailu (New Music Competition) with the song "Ram pam pam", which placed third in the competition.

In the year 2023 Emma-gaala Bess won four awards in the categories of Artist of the Year, Song of the Year, Pop of the Year and Most Streamed Domestic Song of the Year.

In 2024, she changed her legal first name to Bess.

== Personal life ==
Bess has been dating Danish actor Danny Bærtelsen since summer 2020. Bærtelsen has starred in the American film Happy Endings Sleepover. They announced their engagement when Bærtelsen put a ring on her finger after joining one of her dances on the final of Tanssii tähtien kanssa on 24 November 2024.

== Discography ==
=== Albums ===
Year	Album	Chart peak FIN
2019	Bess	29
2023	Kädet ylös	5
2025	Ultravioletti	12

=== Singles ===
==== As lead artist ====
Year	Title	Chart peak FIN	Album
2017	"En pysty lopettaa"	–	Bess
2017	"Tempo"	13	Bess
2017	"Uneton"	–	Bess
2018	"Yhden liikaa"	–	Bess
2018	"Kuuma"	–	Bess
2019	"Feng Shui"	–	Bess
2019	"Pidä musta kii"	–	Bess
2019	"Läpinäkyvää" (feat. F)	–	Bess
2020	"Aja"	20	Kädet ylös
2020	"Melodia"	–	Non-album singles
2021	"Peace"	–	Non-album singles
2021	"Viisi kesää" (feat. Nopsajalka)	12	Non-album singles
2021	"Valoo"	–	Kädet ylös
2022	"Ram pam pam"	1	Kädet ylös
2022	"Rakastan en rakasta"	17	Kädet ylös
2022	"Sammumaton"	15	Kädet ylös
2023	"Lähtee käsistä"	49	Kädet ylös
2023	"Kädet ylös"	19	Kädet ylös
2023	"Missio"	10	Non-album singles
2023	"Riivattu"	35	Non-album singles
2024	"Kyyneleet sateessa"	41	Non-album singles
2025	"Anna tulla"	33	Non-album singles
2025	"Kaistaa" (with Käärijä)	4	Non-album singles
2026	"Kuudes aisti"	46	Non-album singles
2026	"Diva"	29	Non-album singles
2026	"Seksi vie ja taksi tuo"	39	Non-album singles
2026	"Toivottavasti"	12	Non-album singles
2026	"Mut mä pelkää en"	27	Non-album singles

==== As featured artist ====
- "Pimeyteen" (Mikael Gabriel, 2017)
- "100%" (Keko Salata, 2020)
- "Seittemän" (Raappana, 2020)
- "Grindr Mayhem" (Antti Tuisku, 2022)
- "Jos sul ei oo mua" (Kiki, 2023)
