= List of number-one albums (Finland) =

In this page are contained all the lists of number-one albums (according to total sales) from The Official Finnish Charts, beginning with 1989 when the first official Finnish charts were published.

== Weekly albums charts ==
- 1989 ·
- 1990 · 1991 · 1992 · 1993 · 1994 · 1995 · 1996 · 1997 · 1998 · 1999 ·
- 2000 · 2001 · 2002 · 2003 · 2004 · 2005 · 2006 · 2007 · 2008 · 2009 ·
- 2010 · 2011 · 2012 · 2013 · 2014 · 2015 · 2016 · 2017 · 2018 · 2019 ·
- 2020 · 2021 · 2022 · 2023 · 2024 · 2025 · 2026

== Milestones ==
=== Most weeks at number one ===
Number of weeks	Album	Artist(s)
16	Nummela	Anssi Kela
15	Seili	Jenni Vartiainen
13	Strike!	The Baseballs
12 (tie)	Fuel for the Fire	Ari Koivunen
12 (tie)	Anna Puu	Anna Puu
11 (tie)	21	Adele
11 (tie)	Repullinen hittejä	Eppu Normaali
11 (tie)	The Arockalypse	Lordi
10 (tie)	Back for Good	Modern Talking
10 (tie)	Once	Nightwish

=== Most total weeks on the chart ===
Number of weeks	Album	Artist(s)
191	Kiitos ei ole kirosana	Haloo Helsinki! (2014–2019)
178	En kommentoi	Antti Tuisku (2015–2020)
160	21	Adele (2011–2016)
146	Circus	Teflon Brothers (2017–2020)
134	Keskiviikko... 40 ensimmäistä hittiä	Leevi and the Leavings (1997–2004, 2010)
125	17	XXXTentacion (2017–2020)
120	Anatude	Antti Tuisku (2015–2020)
118	÷	Ed Sheeran (2017–2019)
116	24K	Evelina (2016–2019)
114	Tapa poika	Pyhimys (2018–2020)

== See also ==
- The Official Finnish Charts
- List of number-one singles (Finland)
- Luettelot Suomen albumilistan ykkösistä vuosittain (1966–1988) (in Finnish)
- Luettelot Suomen virallisen albumilistan ykkösistä vuosittain (1989→) (in Finnish)
- Luettelot Suomen virallisen singlelistan ykkösistä (1951→) (in Finnish)
