= List of number-one singles of 2022 (Finland) =

This is the complete list of number-one singles in Finland in 2022 according to the Official Finnish Charts. The list on the left side of the box (Suomen virallinen singlelista, "the Official Finnish Singles Chart") represents physical and digital track sales as well as music streaming, and the one on the right side (Suomen virallinen radiosoittolista, "the Official Finnish Airplay Chart") represents airplay.

== Chart history ==
Official Finnish Singles Chart				Official Finnish Airplay Chart			
Issue date	Song	Artist(s)	Reference(s)	Issue date	Song	Artist(s)	Reference(s)
Week 1	"Pohjola"	Olli Halonen		Week 1	"Tulikärpäset"	Haloo Helsinki!	
Week 2	"Vamos"	JVG		Week 2	"Tulikärpäset"	Haloo Helsinki!	
Week 3	"Hyvä me"	Gettomasa		Week 3	"Pohjola"	Olli Halonen	
Week 4	"Ram pam pam"	Bess		Week 4	"Pohjola"	Olli Halonen	
Week 5	"Ram pam pam"	Bess		Week 5	"Shivers"	Ed Sheeran	
Week 6	"Ram pam pam"	Bess		Week 6	"Shivers"	Ed Sheeran	
Week 7	"Ram pam pam"	Bess		Week 7	"Pohjola"	Olli Halonen	
Week 8	"Ram pam pam"	Bess		Week 8	"Shivers"	Ed Sheeran	
Week 9	"Ram pam pam"	Bess		Week 9	"Jezebel"	The Rasmus	
Week 10	"Ram pam pam"	Bess		Week 10	"Pohjola"	Olli Halonen	
Week 11	"Ram pam pam"	Bess		Week 11	"Pohjola"	Olli Halonen	
Week 12	"Ram pam pam"	Bess		Week 12	"Pohjola"	Olli Halonen	
Week 13	"Ram pam pam"	Bess		Week 13	"Sattuu"	Kaija Koo and Pyhimys	
Week 14	"Haluun takas mun perhoset"	Pehmoaino		Week 14	"Pohjola"	Olli Halonen	
Week 15	"Haluun takas mun perhoset"	Pehmoaino		Week 15	"Sattuu"	Kaija Koo and Pyhimys	
Week 16	"Haluun takas mun perhoset"	Pehmoaino		Week 16	"Sattuu"	Kaija Koo and Pyhimys	
Week 17	"500 hevosta"	Gettomasa		Week 17	"Ram pam pam"	Bess	
Week 18	"Amatimies"	JVG		Week 18	"Ram pam pam"	Bess	
Week 19	"Amatimies"	JVG		Week 19	"Ram pam pam"	Bess	
Week 20	"Amatimies"	JVG		Week 20	"Ram pam pam"	Bess	
Week 21	"Amatimies"	JVG		Week 21	"Ram pam pam"	Bess	
Week 22	"Villieläin"	Ramses II		Week 22	"Ram pam pam"	Bess	
Week 23	"Villieläin"	Ramses II		Week 23	"Ram pam pam"	Bess	
Week 24	"20Min"	Isac Elliot (featuring William and Cledos)		Week 24	"Ram pam pam"	Bess	
Week 25	"20Min"	Isac Elliot (featuring William and Cledos)		Week 25	"Ram pam pam"	Bess	
Week 26	"Villieläin"	Ramses II		Week 26	"Ram pam pam"	Bess	
Week 27	"Villieläin"	Ramses II		Week 27	"Ram pam pam"	Bess	
Week 28	"Villieläin"	Ramses II		Week 28	"Ram pam pam"	Bess	
Week 29	"Ei nabbaa"	Jambo (featuring Villegalle)		Week 29	"Ram pam pam"	Bess	
Week 30	"Villieläin"	Ramses II		Week 30	"Ram pam pam"	Bess	
Week 31	"Villieläin"	Ramses II		Week 31	"Ram pam pam"	Bess	
Week 32	"Villieläin"	Ramses II		Week 32	"Ram pam pam"	Bess	
Week 33	"Shamppanjadieetillä"	Gettomasa		Week 33	"Ram pam pam"	Bess	
Week 34	"Shamppanjadieetillä"	Gettomasa		Week 34	"Ram pam pam"	Bess	
Week 35	"Tequilakahvi"	Bee		Week 35	"Ram pam pam"	Bess	
Week 36	"I'm Good (Blue)"	David Guetta and Bebe Rexha		Week 36	"2step"	Ed Sheeran	
Week 37	"Makso mitä makso"	Isac Elliot (featuring Sexmane)		Week 37	"Elämän kova koulu"	Arttu Wiskari	
Week 38	"I'm Good (Blue)"	David Guetta and Bebe Rexha		Week 38	"Suomen kesä"	Olli Halonen	
Week 39	"I'm Good (Blue)"	David Guetta and Bebe Rexha		Week 39	"Snap"	Rosa Linn	
Week 40	"Tippa-T"	Turisti (featuring Elastinen)		Week 40	"Snap"	Rosa Linn	
Week 41	"Tippa-T"	Turisti (featuring Elastinen)		Week 41	"Snap"	Rosa Linn	
Week 42	"Tippa-T"	Turisti (featuring Elastinen)		Week 42	"Snap"	Rosa Linn	
Week 43	"Tippa-T"	Turisti (featuring Elastinen)		Week 43	"Snap"	Rosa Linn	
Week 44	"Ihana kipu"	Viivi and Robin Packalen		Week 44	"Snap"	Rosa Linn	
Week 45	"Ihana kipu"	Viivi and Robin Packalen		Week 45	"Snap"	Rosa Linn	
Week 46	"Vastustamaton"	Gettomasa		Week 46	"I'm Good (Blue)"	David Guetta and Bebe Rexha	
Week 47	"Vastustamaton"	Gettomasa		Week 47	"I'm Good (Blue)"	David Guetta and Bebe Rexha	
Week 48	"Vastustamaton"	Gettomasa		Week 48	"I'm Good (Blue)"	David Guetta and Bebe Rexha	
Week 49	"Vastustamaton"	Gettomasa		Week 49	"Sydän sulaa"	Evelina	
Week 50	"Vastustamaton"	Gettomasa		Week 50	"I'm Good (Blue)"	David Guetta and Bebe Rexha	
Week 51	"Vastustamaton"	Gettomasa		Week 51	"Tulipalo"	Kuumaa	
Week 52	"Last Christmas"	Wham!		Week 52	"I'm Good (Blue)"	David Guetta and Bebe Rexha	

== See also ==
- List of number-one albums of 2022 (Finland)
