= List of number-one albums of 2017 (Finland) =

This is the complete list of number-one albums in Finland in 2017 according to the Official Finnish Charts compiled by Musiikkituottajat – IFPI Finland. The chart is based on sales of physical and digital albums as well as music streaming.

== Chart history ==
Physical and digital albums
Week	Album	Artist(s)	Reference(s)
Week 1	Starboy	The Weeknd	
Week 2	Starboy	The Weeknd	
Week 3	Kauniin kääntöpiiri	Happoradio	
Week 4	Starboy	The Weeknd	
Week 5	Starboy	The Weeknd	
Week 6	Kuume	Pariisin Kevät	
Week 7	Fifty Shades Darker: Original Motion Picture Soundtrack	Various artists	
Week 8	Bringer of Pain	Battle Beast	
Week 9	Antaudun	Reino Nordin	
Week 10	÷	Ed Sheeran	
Week 11	Hulluuden highway	Haloo Helsinki!	
Week 12	Hulluuden highway	Haloo Helsinki!	
Week 13	Hulluuden highway	Haloo Helsinki!	
Week 14	Hulluuden highway	Haloo Helsinki!	
Week 15	Hulluuden highway	Haloo Helsinki!	
Week 16	Hulluuden highway	Haloo Helsinki!	
Week 17	Hulluuden highway	Haloo Helsinki!	
Week 18	Hulluuden highway	Haloo Helsinki!	
Week 19	Hulluuden highway	Haloo Helsinki!	
Week 20	Vain elämää – Kausi 6 ensimmäinen kattaus	Various artists	
Week 21	Vain elämää – Kausi 6 ensimmäinen kattaus	Various artists	
Week 22	Vain elämää – Kausi 6 ensimmäinen kattaus	Various artists	
Week 23	Vain elämää – Kausi 6 toinen kattaus	Various artists	
Week 24	Vain elämää – Kausi 6 toinen kattaus	Various artists	
Week 25	Vain elämää – Kausi 6 toinen kattaus	Various artists	
Week 26	Evolve	Imagine Dragons	
Week 27	Funk Wav Bounces Vol. 1	Calvin Harris	
Week 28	Hulluuden highway	Haloo Helsinki!	
Week 29	Hulluuden highway	Haloo Helsinki!	
Week 30	The Forest Seasons	Wintersun	
Week 31	Hulluuden highway	Haloo Helsinki!	
Week 32	Hulluuden highway	Haloo Helsinki!	
Week 33	Hulluuden highway	Haloo Helsinki!	
Week 34	To the Bone	Steven Wilson	
Week 35	Popkorni	JVG	
Week 36	Popkorni	JVG	
Week 37	Popkorni	JVG	
Week 38	Anatude	Antti Tuisku	
Week 39	Anatude	Antti Tuisku	
Week 40	Anatude	Antti Tuisku	
Week 41	Anatude	Antti Tuisku	
Week 42	Vain elämää – Kausi 7 ensimmäinen kattaus	Various artists	
Week 43	Vain elämää – Kausi 7 ensimmäinen kattaus	Various artists	
Week 44	Vain elämää – Kausi 7 toinen kattaus	Various artists	
Week 45	Vain elämää – Kausi 7 toinen kattaus	Various artists	
Week 46	Vain elämää – Kausi 7 toinen kattaus	Various artists	
Week 47	Raskasta Joulua IV	Various artists	
Week 48	Vain elämää – Kausi 7 toinen kattaus	Vain elämää	
Week 49	Vain elämää – Kausi 7 toinen kattaus	Vain elämää	
Week 50	Tuhansien laulujen maa	Rajaton	
Week 51	Revival	Eminem	
Week 52	Joulu	Various artists	

== See also ==
- List of number-one singles of 2017 (Finland)
