= List of number-one singles of 2017 (Finland) =

This is the complete list of (physical and digital) number-one singles in Finland in 2017 according to the Official Finnish Charts. The list on the left side of the box (Suomen virallinen singlelista, "the Official Finnish Singles Chart") represents physical and digital track sales as well as music streaming, the one in the middle (Suomen virallinen latauslista, "the Official Finnish Download Chart") represents sales of digital tracks and the one on the right side (Suomen virallinen radiosoittolista, "the Official Finnish Airplay Chart") represents airplay.

== Chart history ==
Official Finnish Singles Chart				Official Finnish Download Chart				Official Finnish Airplay Chart			
Issue date	Song	Artist(s)	Reference(s)	Issue date	Song	Artist(s)	Reference(s)	Issue date	Song	Artist(s)	Reference(s)
Week 1	"Hukutaan"	Arttu Lindeman		Week 1	"Rockabye"	Clean Bandit (featuring Sean Paul and Anne-Marie)		Week 1	"Autiosaari"	Tuure Kilpeläinen and Kaihon Karavaani	
Week 2	"Shape of You"	Ed Sheeran		Week 2	"Shape of You"	Ed Sheeran		Week 2	"Rakas"	Haloo Helsinki!	
Week 3	"Shape of You"	Ed Sheeran		Week 3	"Shape of You"	Ed Sheeran		Week 3	"Rakas"	Haloo Helsinki!	
Week 4	"Shape of You"	Ed Sheeran		Week 4	"Shape of You"	Ed Sheeran		Week 4	"Rakas"	Haloo Helsinki!	
Week 5	"Shape of You"	Ed Sheeran		Week 5	"Hulluuden Highway"	Haloo Helsinki!		Week 5	"Rakas"	Haloo Helsinki!	
Week 6	"Liikaa sussa kii"	Mikael Gabriel and Isac Elliot		Week 6	"Hulluuden Highway"	Haloo Helsinki!		Week 6	"Alone"	Alan Walker	
Week 7	"Liikaa sussa kii"	Mikael Gabriel and Isac Elliot		Week 7	"Yhtäccii"	Profeetat, Elastinen and Cheek		Week 7	"Shape of You"	Ed Sheeran	
Week 8	"Sitä säät mitä tilaat"	JVG (featuring Ellinoora)		Week 8	"Hulluuden Highway"	Haloo Helsinki!		Week 8	"Shape of You"	Ed Sheeran	
Week 9	"Sitä säät mitä tilaat"	JVG (featuring Ellinoora)		Week 9	"Rahan takii"	Antti Tuisku		Week 9	"Shape of You"	Ed Sheeran	
Week 10	"Rahan takii"	Antti Tuisku		Week 10	"Rahan takii"	Antti Tuisku		Week 10	"Shape of You"	Ed Sheeran	
Week 11	"Shape of You"	Ed Sheeran		Week 11	"Rahan takii"	Antti Tuisku		Week 11	"Shape of You"	Ed Sheeran	
Week 12	"Shape of You"	Ed Sheeran		Week 12	"Urheiluhullu"	JVG		Week 12	"Shape of You"	Ed Sheeran	
Week 13	"Shape of You"	Ed Sheeran		Week 13	"Hula Hula"	Robin (featuring Nelli Matula)		Week 13	"Shape of You"	Ed Sheeran	
Week 14	"Shape of You"	Ed Sheeran		Week 14	"Paradise"	The Rasmus		Week 14	"Chained to the Rhythm"	Katy Perry (featuring Skip Marley)	
Week 15	"Antaudun"	Reino Nordin		Week 15	"Sign of the Times"	Harry Styles		Week 15	"Chained to the Rhythm"	Katy Perry (featuring Skip Marley)	
Week 16	"Antaudun"	Reino Nordin		Week 16	"Hula Hula"	Robin (featuring Nelli Matula)		Week 16	"Chained to the Rhythm"	Katy Perry (featuring Skip Marley)	
Week 17	"Pettävällä jäällä"	Nikke Ankara		Week 17	"Rakkaus on lumivalkoinen"	Robin		Week 17	"Chained to the Rhythm"	Katy Perry (featuring Skip Marley)	
Week 18	"Despacito" (Remix)	Luis Fonsi and Daddy Yankee (featuring Justin Bieber)		Week 18	"Despacito" (Remix)	Luis Fonsi and Daddy Yankee (featuring Justin Bieber)		Week 18	"Symphony"	Clean Bandit (featuring Zara Larsson)	
Week 19	"Despacito" (Remix)	Luis Fonsi and Daddy Yankee (featuring Justin Bieber)		Week 19	"Muitaki ihmisii"	Vesala		Week 19	"Antaudun"	Reino Nordin	
Week 20	"Despacito" (Remix)	Luis Fonsi and Daddy Yankee (featuring Justin Bieber)		Week 20	"Amar pelos dois"	Salvador Sobral		Week 20	"Antaudun"	Reino Nordin	
Week 21	"Despacito" (Remix)	Luis Fonsi and Daddy Yankee (featuring Justin Bieber)		Week 21	"Ei riidellä enää"	Chisu		Week 21	"Antaudun"	Reino Nordin	
Week 22	"Despacito" (Remix)	Luis Fonsi and Daddy Yankee (featuring Justin Bieber)		Week 22	"Hanuri"	Antti Tuisku (featuring Boyat)		Week 22	"Antaudun"	Reino Nordin	
Week 23	"Hanuri"	Antti Tuisku (featuring Boyat)		Week 23	"Hanuri"	Antti Tuisku (featuring Boyat)		Week 23	"Antaudun"	Reino Nordin	
Week 24	"Despacito" (Remix)	Luis Fonsi and Daddy Yankee (featuring Justin Bieber)		Week 24	"2U"	David Guetta (featuring Justin Bieber)		Week 24	"Despacito" (Remix)	Luis Fonsi and Daddy Yankee (featuring Justin Bieber)	
Week 25	"Despacito" (Remix)	Luis Fonsi and Daddy Yankee (featuring Justin Bieber)		Week 25	"Rakasta mut palasiks"	Bang for the Buck (featuring Reino Nordin)		Week 25	"Antaudun"	Reino Nordin	
Week 26	"Despacito" (Remix)	Luis Fonsi and Daddy Yankee (featuring Justin Bieber)		Week 26	"Hula Hula"	Robin (featuring Nelli Matula)		Week 26	"Hula Hula"	Robin (featuring Nelli Matula)	
Week 27	"Despacito" (Remix)	Luis Fonsi and Daddy Yankee (featuring Justin Bieber)		Week 27	"Two Fux"	Adam Lambert		Week 27	"Despacito" (Remix)	Luis Fonsi and Daddy Yankee (featuring Justin Bieber)	
Week 28	"Despacito" (Remix)	Luis Fonsi and Daddy Yankee (featuring Justin Bieber)		Week 28	"Se oikea"	Jenni Vartiainen		Week 28	"Despacito" (Remix)	Luis Fonsi and Daddy Yankee (featuring Justin Bieber)	
Week 29	"Despacito" (Remix)	Luis Fonsi and Daddy Yankee (featuring Justin Bieber)		Week 29	"Despacito"	Luis Fonsi (featuring Daddy Yankee)		Week 29	"Despacito" (Remix)	Luis Fonsi and Daddy Yankee (featuring Justin Bieber)	
Week 30	"Despacito" (Remix)	Luis Fonsi and Daddy Yankee (featuring Justin Bieber)		Week 30	"Back to You"	Louis Tomlinson (featuring Bebe Rexha and Digital Farm Animals)		Week 30	"Despacito" (Remix)	Luis Fonsi and Daddy Yankee (featuring Justin Bieber)	
Week 31	"Eyo"	Profeetat, Elastinen and Cheek (featuring Nelli Matula)		Week 31	"Eyo"	Profeetat, Elastinen and Cheek (featuring Nelli Matula)		Week 31	"Despacito" (Remix)	Luis Fonsi and Daddy Yankee (featuring Justin Bieber)	
Week 32	"Eyo"	Profeetat, Elastinen and Cheek (featuring Nelli Matula)		Week 32	"Pipefest"	Profeetat, Elastinen and Cheek (featuring Paleface)		Week 32	"Despacito" (Remix)	Luis Fonsi and Daddy Yankee (featuring Justin Bieber)	
Week 33	"Eikö sua hävetä"	Tuure Boelius		Week 33	"Vaikee mut oikee"	Janna (featuring Nikke Ankara)		Week 33	"More Than You Know"	Axwell Λ Ingrosso	
Week 34	"Aamukuuteen"	Antti Tuisku (featuring Erin)		Week 34	"Aamukuuteen"	Antti Tuisku (featuring Erin)		Week 34	"More Than You Know"	Axwell Λ Ingrosso	
Week 35	"Me tehtiin tää"	Robin		Week 35	"Look What You Made Me Do"	Taylor Swift		Week 35	"Tuhoutuva tarina"	Olli Lindholm	
Week 36	"Älä jätä roikkuu"	JVG		Week 36	"Tornado"	Evelina		Week 36	"Feels"	Calvin Harris (featuring Pharrell Williams, Katy Perry and Big Sean)	
Week 37	"Älä jätä roikkuu"	JVG		Week 37	"Keinu"	Jenni Vartiainen		Week 37	"Feels"	Calvin Harris (featuring Pharrell Williams, Katy Perry and Big Sean)	
Week 38	"Sinä ansaitset kultaa"	Cheek		Week 38	"Sinä ansaitset kultaa"	Cheek		Week 38	"Without You"	Avicii (featuring Sandro Cavazza)	
Week 39	"Rockstar"	Post Malone (featuring 21 Savage)		Week 39	"Phases"	Alma and French Montana		Week 39	"Aamukuuteen"	Antti Tuisku (featuring Erin)	
Week 40	"Rockstar"	Post Malone (featuring 21 Savage)		Week 40	"Jumala"	Cheek		Week 40	"Muitaki ihmisii"	Vesala	
Week 41	"Rockstar"	Post Malone (featuring 21 Savage)		Week 41	"Keinu"	Jenni Vartiainen		Week 41	"Aamukuuteen"	Antti Tuisku (featuring Erin)	
Week 42	"Rockstar"	Post Malone (featuring 21 Savage)		Week 42	"Kelpaat kelle vaan"	Sanni (featuring Apocalyptica)		Week 42	"Aamukuuteen"	Antti Tuisku (featuring Erin)	
Week 43	"Rockstar"	Post Malone (featuring 21 Savage)		Week 43	"Surulapsi"	Cheek		Week 43	"Muitaki ihmisii"	Vesala	
Week 44	"Rockstar"	Post Malone (featuring 21 Savage)		Week 44	"Surulapsi"	Cheek		Week 44	"Muitaki ihmisii"	Vesala	
Week 45	"Rockstar"	Post Malone (featuring 21 Savage)		Week 45	—N/a			Week 45	"Muitaki ihmisii"	Vesala	
Week 46	"Rockstar"	Post Malone (featuring 21 Savage)		Week 46	—N/a			Week 46	"Muitaki ihmisii"	Vesala	
Week 47	"Enkelit"	Cheek		Week 47	—N/a			Week 47	"Muitaki ihmisii"	Vesala	
Week 48	"Rockstar"	Post Malone (featuring 21 Savage)		Week 48	—N/a			Week 48	"Muitaki ihmisii"	Vesala	
Week 49	"Solmussa"	Pikku G (featuring Behm)		Week 49	—N/a			Week 49	"Muitaki ihmisii"	Vesala	
Week 50	"Solmussa"	Pikku G (featuring Behm)		Week 50	—N/a			Week 50	"Muitaki ihmisii"	Vesala	
Week 51	"Solmussa"	Pikku G (featuring Behm)		Week 51	—N/a			Week 51	"Muitaki ihmisii"	Vesala	
Week 52	"Solmussa"	Pikku G (featuring Behm)		Week 52	—N/a			Week 52	"Perfect"	Ed Sheeran	

== See also ==
- List of number-one albums of 2017 (Finland)
