= List of number-one singles of 2015 (Finland) =

This is the complete list of (physical and digital) number-one singles sold in Finland in 2015 according to the Official Finnish Charts. The list on the left side of the box (Suomen virallinen singlelista, "the Official Finnish Singles Chart") represents physical and digital track sales as well as music streaming, the one in the middle (Suomen virallinen latauslista, "the Official Finnish Download Chart") represents sales of digital tracks and the one on the right side (Suomen virallinen radiosoittolista, "the Official Finnish Airplay Chart") represents airplay.

== Chart history ==
Official Finnish Singles Chart				Official Finnish Download Chart				Official Finnish Airplay Chart			
Issue date	Song	Artist(s)	Reference(s)	Issue date	Song	Artist(s)	Reference(s)	Issue date	Song	Artist(s)	Reference(s)
Week 1	"Macho Fantastico"	Spekti (featuring Tasis)		Week 1	"Blank Space"	Taylor Swift		Week 1	"Yksin"	Jonne Aaron	
Week 2	"Outside"	Calvin Harris (featuring Ellie Goulding)		Week 2	"Who the Fuck Is Alice"	Max and the Ducks		Week 2	"Minä sinua vaan"	Jenni Vartiainen	
Week 3	"Outside"	Calvin Harris (featuring Ellie Goulding)		Week 3	"Eteen ja ylös"	Elastinen		Week 3	"Minä sinua vaan"	Jenni Vartiainen	
Week 4	"Samsara 2015"	Martin Tungevaag (featuring Emila)		Week 4	"Eteen ja ylös"	Elastinen		Week 4	"Minä sinua vaan"	Jenni Vartiainen	
Week 5	"Samsara 2015"	Martin Tungevaag (featuring Emila)		Week 5	"Eteen ja ylös"	Elastinen		Week 5	"Minä sinua vaan"	Jenni Vartiainen	
Week 6	"Samsara 2015"	Martin Tungevaag (featuring Emila)		Week 6	"Eteen ja ylös"	Elastinen		Week 6	"Copacabana ja Ipanema"	Juha Tapio	
Week 7	"Samsara 2015"	Martin Tungevaag (featuring Emila)		Week 7	"Eteen ja ylös"	Elastinen		Week 7	"Copacabana ja Ipanema"	Juha Tapio	
Week 8	"Samsara 2015"	Martin Tungevaag (featuring Emila)		Week 8	"Élan"	Nightwish		Week 8	"Kiitos ei ole kirosana"	Haloo Helsinki!	
Week 9	"Love Me like You Do"	Ellie Goulding		Week 9	"Peto on irti"	Antti Tuisku		Week 9	"Kiitos ei ole kirosana"	Haloo Helsinki!	
Week 10	"Love Me like You Do"	Ellie Goulding		Week 10	"2080-luvulla"	Sanni		Week 10	"2080-luvulla"	Sanni	
Week 11	"Love Me like You Do"	Ellie Goulding		Week 11	"2080-luvulla"	Sanni		Week 11	"2080-luvulla"	Sanni	
Week 12	"Love Me like You Do"	Ellie Goulding		Week 12	"Élan"	Nightwish		Week 12	"2080-luvulla"	Sanni	
Week 13	"Lean On"	Major Lazer & DJ Snake (featuring MØ)		Week 13 (Note: Both songs were ranked as number one.)	"Super"	Elastinen		Week 13	"2080-luvulla"	Sanni	
Week 13	"Lean On"	Major Lazer & DJ Snake (featuring MØ)		Week 13	"Beautiful Alien"	Darude (featuring AI AM)		Week 13	"2080-luvulla"	Sanni	
Week 14	"Lean On"	Major Lazer & DJ Snake (featuring MØ)		Week 14	"Bitch Better Have My Money"	Rihanna		Week 14	"2080-luvulla"	Sanni	
Week 15	"Lean On"	Major Lazer & DJ Snake (featuring MØ)		Week 15	"Are You with Me"	Lost Frequencies		Week 15	"2080-luvulla"	Sanni	
Week 15	"Lean On"	Major Lazer & DJ Snake (featuring MØ)		Week 15	"2080-luvulla"	Sanni		Week 15	"2080-luvulla"	Sanni	
Week 16	"See You Again"	Wiz Khalifa (featuring Charlie Puth)		Week 16	"Are You with Me"	Lost Frequencies		Week 16	"2080-luvulla"	Sanni	
Week 17	"See You Again"	Wiz Khalifa (featuring Charlie Puth)		Week 17	"Kipinän hetki"	Robin (featuring Elastinen)		Week 17	"2080-luvulla"	Sanni	
Week 18	"See You Again"	Wiz Khalifa (featuring Charlie Puth)		Week 18	"Kipinän hetki"	Robin (featuring Elastinen)		Week 18	"2080-luvulla"	Sanni	
Week 19	"Lean On"	Major Lazer & DJ Snake (featuring MØ)		Week 19	"Kipinän hetki"	Robin (featuring Elastinen)		Week 19	"2080-luvulla"	Sanni	
Week 20	"Pämppää"	Teflon Brothers (featuring Sahamies)		Week 20	"Kipinän hetki"	Robin (featuring Elastinen)		Week 20	"2080-luvulla"	Sanni	
Week 21	"Pämppää"	Teflon Brothers (featuring Sahamies)		Week 21	"Vauvoja"	Kasmir (featuring Saara)		Week 21	"Stole the Show"	Kygo (featuring Parson James)	
Week 22	"Pämppää"	Teflon Brothers (featuring Sahamies)		Week 22	"Heroes"	Måns Zelmerlöw		Week 22	"2080-luvulla"	Sanni	
Week 23	"Pämppää"	Teflon Brothers (featuring Sahamies)		Week 23	"Heroes"	Måns Zelmerlöw		Week 23	"Stole the Show"	Kygo (featuring Parson James)	
Week 24	"Pämppää"	Teflon Brothers (featuring Sahamies)		Week 24	"Kahvimaito"	Arttu Wiskari		Week 24	"Vauvoja"	Kasmir (featuring Saara)	
Week 25	"Pämppää"	Teflon Brothers (featuring Sahamies)		Week 25	"Are You with Me"	Lost Frequencies		Week 25	"Vauvoja"	Kasmir (featuring Saara)	
Week 26	"Pämppää"	Teflon Brothers (featuring Sahamies)		Week 26	"Ghost Town"	Adam Lambert		Week 26	"Vauvoja"	Kasmir (featuring Saara)	
Week 27	"Pämppää"	Teflon Brothers (featuring Sahamies)		Week 27	"Ghost Town"	Adam Lambert		Week 27	"Vauvoja"	Kasmir (featuring Saara)	
Week 28	"Pämppää"	Teflon Brothers (featuring Sahamies)		Week 28	"Madafakin darra"	Roope Salminen & Koirat		Week 28	"Vauvoja"	Kasmir (featuring Saara)	
Week 29	"Madafakin darra"	Roope Salminen & Koirat		Week 29	"Tarkenee"	JVG		Week 29	"Vauvoja"	Kasmir (featuring Saara)	
Week 30	"Tarkenee"	JVG		Week 30	"Tarkenee"	JVG		Week 30	"This Summer's Gonna Hurt"	Maroon 5	
Week 31	"Tarkenee"	JVG		Week 31	"Madafakin darra"	Roope Salminen & Koirat		Week 31	"Kuussa tuulee"	Haloo Helsinki!	
Week 32	"Tarkenee"	JVG		Week 32	"Drag Me Down"	One Direction		Week 32	"Pulp Fiction"	Haloo Helsinki!	
Week 33	"Tarkenee"	JVG		Week 33	"Madafakin darra"	Roope Salminen & Koirat		Week 33	"Ihana"	Chisu	
Week 34	"Tarkenee"	JVG		Week 34	"Madafakin darra"	Roope Salminen & Koirat		Week 34	"Sinun vuorosi loistaa"	Juha Tapio	
Week 35	"Sä huudat"	Cheek		Week 35	"Sä huudat"	Cheek		Week 35	"Madafakin darra"	Roope Salminen & Koirat	
Week 36	"Sä huudat"	Cheek		Week 36	"What Do You Mean?"	Justin Bieber		Week 36	"Ihana"	Chisu	
Week 37	"What Do You Mean?"	Justin Bieber		Week 37	"Wild"	Troye Sivan		Week 37	"Madafakin darra"	Roope Salminen & Koirat	
Week 38	"What Do You Mean?"	Justin Bieber		Week 38	"Takajeejee"	JVG (featuring Evelina)		Week 38	"Ihana"	Chisu	
Week 39	"Sata salamaa"	Antti Tuisku		Week 39	"Sata salamaa"	Antti Tuisku		Week 39	"Sinun vuorosi loistaa"	Juha Tapio	
Week 40	"Sata salamaa"	Antti Tuisku		Week 40	"Sata salamaa"	Antti Tuisku		Week 40	"Sinun vuorosi loistaa"	Juha Tapio	
Week 41	"Sata salamaa"	Antti Tuisku		Week 41	"Sata salamaa"	Antti Tuisku		Week 41	"Sinun vuorosi loistaa"	Juha Tapio	
Week 42	"Värifilmi"	Nikke Ankara (featuring Aki Tykki)		Week 42	"Sata salamaa"	Antti Tuisku		Week 42	"Sinun vuorosi loistaa"	Juha Tapio	
Week 43	"Sillat"	Cheek (featuring Ilta)		Week 43	"Perfect"	One Direction		Week 43	"Valot pimeyksien reunoilla"	Apulanta	
Week 44	"Sillat"	Cheek (featuring Ilta)		Week 44	"Hello"	Adele		Week 44	"Valot pimeyksien reunoilla"	Apulanta	
Week 45	"Hello"	Adele		Week 45	"Hello"	Adele		Week 45	"Valot pimeyksien reunoilla"	Apulanta	
Week 46	"Lähtisitkö"	VilleGalle (featuring Sanni)		Week 46	"Hello"	Adele		Week 46	"Valot pimeyksien reunoilla"	Apulanta	
Week 47	"Lähtisitkö"	VilleGalle (featuring Sanni)		Week 47	"Hello"	Adele		Week 47	"Valot pimeyksien reunoilla"	Apulanta	
Week 48	"Hello"	Adele		Week 48	"Hello"	Adele		Week 48	"Valot pimeyksien reunoilla"	Apulanta	
Week 49	"Hello"	Adele		Week 49	"Hello"	Adele		Week 49	"Hello"	Adele	
Week 50	"Russian Roulette"	Tungevaag & Raaban X Charlie Who?		Week 50	"Hello"	Adele		Week 50	"Hello"	Adele	
Week 51	"Russian Roulette"	Tungevaag & Raaban X Charlie Who?		Week 51	"Hello"	Adele		Week 51	"Hello"	Adele	
Week 52	"Party (Papiidipaadi)"	Antti Tuisku (featuring Nikke Ankara)		Week 52	"Party (Papiidipaadi)"	Antti Tuisku (featuring Nikke Ankara)		Week 52	"Eläköön"	Juha Tapio	
Week 53	"Honey"	Evelina (featuring Mikael Gabriel)		Week 53	"Party (Papiidipaadi)"	Antti Tuisku (featuring Nikke Ankara)		Week 53	"Valot pimeyksien reunoilla"	Apulanta	

== See also ==
- List of number-one albums of 2015 (Finland)
