= List of number-one albums of 2019 (Finland) =

This is the complete list of number-one albums in Finland in 2019 according to the Official Finnish Charts compiled by Musiikkituottajat – IFPI Finland. The chart is based on sales of physical and digital albums as well as music streaming.

== Chart history ==
Physical and digital albums
Week	Album	Artist(s)	Reference(s)
Week 1	Different World	Alan Walker	
Week 2	Different World	Alan Walker	
Week 3	Different World	Alan Walker	
Week 4	Last Call: Live in Helsinki	Remu & Hurriganes	
Week 5	When a Shadow Is Forced into the Light	Swallow the Sun	
Week 6	Dumari ja spuget – Usvaa putkeen	Tuomari Nurmio	
Week 7	From Hell with Love	Beast in Black	
Week 8	Ville Valo & Agents	Ville Valo & Agents	
Week 9	Ville Valo & Agents	Ville Valo & Agents	
Week 10	Meidän tulevat päivät	Lauri Tähkä	
Week 11	Hexed	Children of Bodom	
Week 12	Ville Valo & Agents	Ville Valo & Agents	
Week 13	No More Hollywood Endings	Battle Beast	
Week 14	When We All Fall Asleep, Where Do We Go?	Billie Eilish	
Week 15	When We All Fall Asleep, Where Do We Go?	Billie Eilish	
Week 16	Yhden naisen hautajaiset	Ellips	
Week 17	When We All Fall Asleep, Where Do We Go?	Billie Eilish	
Week 18	When We All Fall Asleep, Where Do We Go?	Billie Eilish	
Week 19	When We All Fall Asleep, Where Do We Go?	Billie Eilish	
Week 20	Olisinpa täällä	Pyhimys and Saimaa	
Week 21	Rammstein	Rammstein	
Week 22	Diplomaatti	Gettomasa	
Week 23	Diplomaatti	Gettomasa	
Week 24	Tim	Avicii	
Week 25	Rata/raitti	JVG	
Week 26	Rata/raitti	JVG	
Week 27	Trippi	Sanni	
Week 28	Rata/raitti	JVG	
Week 29	No.6 Collaborations Project	Ed Sheeran	
Week 30	No.6 Collaborations Project	Ed Sheeran	
Week 31	No.6 Collaborations Project	Ed Sheeran	
Week 32	Rata/raitti	JVG	
Week 33	We Are Not Your Kind	Slipknot	
Week 34	Rata/raitti	JVG	
Week 35	Rata/raitti	JVG	
Week 36	Vaaleanpunainen vallankumous	Ellinoora	
Week 37	Hollywood's Bleeding	Post Malone	
Week 38	Hollywood's Bleeding	Post Malone	
Week 39	Hollywood's Bleeding	Post Malone	
Week 40	Vain elämää – kausi 10 ensimmäinen kattaus	Various artists	
Week 41	Heart Like a Grave	Insomnium	
Week 42	Vain elämää – kausi 10 ensimmäinen kattaus	Various artists	
Week 43	Vain elämää – kausi 10 ensimmäinen kattaus	Various artists	
Week 44	Kaikki tiet vievät peltolaan	Maustetytöt	
Week 45	Vain elämää – kausi 10 toinen kattaus	Various artists	
Week 46	Vain elämää – kausi 10 toinen kattaus	Various artists	
Week 47	Vain elämää – kausi 10 toinen kattaus	Various artists	
Week 48	Vain elämää – kausi 10 toinen kattaus	Various artists	
Week 49	Vain elämää – joulu	Various artists	
Week 50	Decades: Live in Buenos Aires	Nightwish	
Week 51	Volume	Various artists	
Week 52	Vain elämää – joulu	Various artists	

== See also ==
- List of number-one singles of 2019 (Finland)
