= List of number-one singles of 2020 (Finland) =

This is the complete list of number-one singles in Finland in 2020 according to the Official Finnish Charts. The list on the left side of the box (Suomen virallinen singlelista, "the Official Finnish Singles Chart") represents physical and digital track sales as well as music streaming, and the one on the right side (Suomen virallinen radiosoittolista, "the Official Finnish Airplay Chart") represents airplay.

== Chart history ==
Official Finnish Singles Chart				Official Finnish Airplay Chart			
Issue date	Song	Artist(s)	Reference(s)	Issue date	Song	Artist(s)	Reference(s)
Week 1	"Hei rakas"	Behm		Week 1	"Hei rakas"	Behm	
Week 2	"Hei rakas"	Behm		Week 2	"Sä saat mut palasiksi"	Stereo (featuring Samu Haber)	
Week 3	"Hei rakas"	Behm		Week 3	"Hei rakas"	Behm	
Week 4	"Godzilla"	Eminem (featuring Juice Wrld)		Week 4	"Hei rakas"	Behm	
Week 5	"Godzilla"	Eminem (featuring Juice Wrld)		Week 5	"Hei rakas"	Behm	
Week 6	"Epäröimättä hetkeekään"	Elastinen and Jenni Vartiainen		Week 6	"Hei rakas"	Behm	
Week 7	"Valittu kansa"	Antti Tuisku		Week 7	"Hei rakas"	Behm	
Week 8	"Epäröimättä hetkeekään"	Elastinen and Jenni Vartiainen		Week 8	"Hei rakas"	Behm	
Week 9	"Epäröimättä hetkeekään"	Elastinen and Jenni Vartiainen		Week 9	"Hei rakas"	Behm	
Week 10	"Blinding Lights"	The Weeknd		Week 10	"Hei rakas"	Behm	
Week 11	"Kysymys"	Cledos (featuring Pyhimys)		Week 11	"Hei rakas"	Behm	
Week 12	"Kysymys"	Cledos (featuring Pyhimys)		Week 12	"Epäröimättä hetkeekään"	Elastinen and Jenni Vartiainen	
Week 13	"Blinding Lights"	The Weeknd		Week 13	"Epäröimättä hetkeekään"	Elastinen and Jenni Vartiainen	
Week 14	"Blinding Lights"	The Weeknd		Week 14	"Epäröimättä hetkeekään"	Elastinen and Jenni Vartiainen	
Week 15	"Blinding Lights"	The Weeknd		Week 15	"Epäröimättä hetkeekään"	Elastinen and Jenni Vartiainen	
Week 16	"Blinding Lights"	The Weeknd		Week 16	"Epäröimättä hetkeekään"	Elastinen and Jenni Vartiainen	
Week 17	"Blinding Lights"	The Weeknd		Week 17	"Epäröimättä hetkeekään"	Elastinen and Jenni Vartiainen	
Week 18	"Blinding Lights"	The Weeknd		Week 18	"Epäröimättä hetkeekään"	Elastinen and Jenni Vartiainen	
Week 19	"Blinding Lights"	The Weeknd		Week 19	"Epäröimättä hetkeekään"	Elastinen and Jenni Vartiainen	
Week 20	"Blinding Lights"	The Weeknd		Week 20	"Epäröimättä hetkeekään"	Elastinen and Jenni Vartiainen	
Week 21	"Gooba"	6ix9ine		Week 21	"Epäröimättä hetkeekään"	Elastinen and Jenni Vartiainen	
Week 22	"Penelope"	William featuring Clever		Week 22	"Epäröimättä hetkeekään"	Elastinen and Jenni Vartiainen	
Week 23	"Penelope"	William featuring Clever		Week 23	"Epäröimättä hetkeekään"	Elastinen and Jenni Vartiainen	
Week 24	"Penelope"	William featuring Clever		Week 24	"Epäröimättä hetkeekään"	Elastinen and Jenni Vartiainen	
Week 25	"Villi Länsi"	JVG		Week 25	"Epäröimättä hetkeekään"	Elastinen and Jenni Vartiainen	
Week 26	"Penelope"	William featuring Clever		Week 26	"Epäröimättä hetkeekään"	Elastinen and Jenni Vartiainen	
Week 27	"Penelope"	William featuring Clever		Week 27	"Epäröimättä hetkeekään"	Elastinen and Jenni Vartiainen	
Week 28	"Penelope"	William featuring Clever		Week 28	"Epäröimättä hetkeekään"	Elastinen and Jenni Vartiainen	
Week 29	"Penelope"	William featuring Clever		Week 29	"Epäröimättä hetkeekään"	Elastinen and Jenni Vartiainen	
Week 30	"Penelope"	William featuring Clever		Week 30	"2020"	Anna Puu and Olavi Uusivirta	
Week 31	"Penelope"	William featuring Clever		Week 31	"2020"	Anna Puu and Olavi Uusivirta	
Week 32	"Penelope"	William featuring Clever		Week 32	"2020"	Anna Puu and Olavi Uusivirta	
Week 33	"Penelope"	William featuring Clever		Week 33	"Epäröimättä hetkeekään"	Elastinen and Jenni Vartiainen	
Week 34	"Penelope"	William featuring Clever		Week 34	"Epäröimättä hetkeekään"	Elastinen and Jenni Vartiainen	
Week 35	"Penelope"	William featuring Clever		Week 35	"Epäröimättä hetkeekään"	Elastinen and Jenni Vartiainen	
Week 36	"Penelope"	William featuring Clever		Week 36	"Tässäkö tää oli"	Arttu Wiskari featuring Leavings-Orkesteri	
Week 37	"Penelope"	William featuring Clever		Week 37	"Yhtenä sunnuntaina"	Erin	
Week 38	"Penelope"	William featuring Clever		Week 38	"Yhtenä sunnuntaina"	Erin	
Week 39	"Frida"	Behm		Week 39	"Yhtenä sunnuntaina"	Erin	
Week 40	"Frida"	Behm		Week 40	"2020"	Anna Puu and Olavi Uusivirta	
Week 41	"Penelope"	William featuring Clever		Week 41	"Yhtenä sunnuntaina"	Erin	
Week 42	"Penelope"	William featuring Clever		Week 42	"Yhtenä sunnuntaina"	Erin	
Week 43	"Penelope"	William featuring Clever		Week 43	"Yhtenä sunnuntaina"	Erin	
Week 44	"Penelope"	William featuring Clever		Week 44	"Yhtenä sunnuntaina"	Erin	
Week 45	"Penelope"	William featuring Clever		Week 45	"Frida"	Behm	
Week 46	"Kuningaskobra"	Stig		Week 46	"Frida"	Behm	
Week 47	"Pyyntö"	Jannika B		Week 47	"Frida"	Behm	
Week 48	"Pyyntö"	Jannika B		Week 48	"Frida"	Behm	
Week 49	"Veli mä vannon"	Gettomasa		Week 49	"Frida"	Behm	
Week 50	"Veli mä vannon"	Gettomasa		Week 50	"Frida"	Behm	
Week 51	"Frida"	Behm		Week 51	"Frida"	Behm	
Week 52	"Snowman"	Sia		Week 52	"Frida"	Behm	
Week 53	"Snowman"	Sia		Week 53	"Frida"	Behm	

== See also ==
- List of number-one albums of 2020 (Finland)
