= Kanaria =

Kanaria may refer to:

- Kanaria (born 2002), Japanese musician
- Kanaria, a 2001 album by Rikki
- "Kanaria", a song by Gettomasa from the EP 17, 2017
- Kanaria, a fictional character in Rozen Maiden
- Kanaria, a fictional character in the Anti-Magic Academy: The 35th Test Platoon anime
- "Kanaria", an episode of Rozen Maiden

== See also ==
- "Kanariya"
- Canaria District
