= List of number-one albums of 2020 (Finland) =

This is the complete list of number-one albums in Finland in 2020 according to the Official Finnish Charts compiled by Musiikkituottajat – IFPI Finland. The chart is based on sales of physical and digital albums as well as music streaming.

== Chart history ==
Physical and digital albums
Week	Album	Artist(s)	Reference(s)
Week 1	Volume	Various artists	
Week 2	Mikko	Pyhimys	
Week 3	Mikko	Pyhimys	
Week 4	Music to Be Murdered By	Eminem	
Week 5	Music to Be Murdered By	Eminem	
Week 6	Mikko	Pyhimys	
Week 7	Valittu kansa	Antti Tuisku	
Week 8	Valittu kansa	Antti Tuisku	
Week 9	Ihmissokkelo	Mokoma	
Week 10	F8	Five Finger Death Punch	
Week 11	Paluu paratiisiin	Tuure Kilpeläinen and Kaihon Karavaani	
Week 12	Valittu kansa	Antti Tuisku	
Week 13	Vuonna nolla	Ida Paul and Kalle Lindroth	
Week 14	Future Nostalgia	Dua Lipa	
Week 15	Future Nostalgia	Dua Lipa	
Week 16	Human. :II: Nature.	Nightwish	
Week 17	Global Warning	Turmion Kätilöt	
Week 18	Human. :II: Nature.	Nightwish	
Week 19	Rata/raitti	JVG	
Week 20	After Hours	The Weeknd	
Week 21	Have U Seen Her?	Alma	
Week 22	After Hours	The Weeknd	
Week 23	Chromatica	Lady Gaga	
Week 24	Chromatica	Lady Gaga	
Week 25	After Hours	The Weeknd	
Week 26	Alaston Suåmi	Petri Nygård	
Week 27	Franckensteina Strataemontanus	Carach Angren	
Week 28	Shoot for the Stars, Aim for the Moon	Pop Smoke	
Week 29	Thalassic	Ensiferum	
Week 30	Legends Never Die	Juice Wrld	
Week 31	Folklore	Taylor Swift	
Week 32	Mkdmsk	Mkdmsk	
Week 33	Whoosh!	Deep Purple	
Week 34	Ceissi	Cledos	
Week 35	Ceissi	Cledos	
Week 36	Suomen muotoisen pilven alla	Arttu Wiskari	
Week 37	Shakespeare	William	
Week 38	Shakespeare	William	
Week 39	Draaman kaari viehättää	Behm	
Week 40	Draaman kaari viehättää	Behm	
Week 41	Draaman kaari viehättää	Behm	
Week 42	Draaman kaari viehättää	Behm	
Week 43	Draaman kaari viehättää	Behm	
Week 44	Draaman kaari viehättää	Behm	
Week 45	Kausi 11 ensimmäinen kattaus	Vain elämää	
Week 46	Kausi 11 ensimmäinen kattaus	Vain elämää	
Week 47	Power Up	AC/DC	
Week 48	Draaman kaari viehättää	Behm	
Week 49	Kausi 11 toinen kattaus	Vain elämää	
Week 50	Kausi 11 toinen kattaus	Vain elämää	
Week 51	Draaman kaari viehättää	Behm	
Week 52	Draaman kaari viehättää	Behm	
Week 53	Draaman kaari viehättää	Behm	

== See also ==
- List of number-one singles of 2020 (Finland)
