= List of number-one albums of 2023 (Finland) =

This is the complete list of number-one albums in Finland in 2023 according to the Official Finnish Charts compiled by Musiikkituottajat. The chart is based on sales of physical and digital albums as well as music streaming.

== Chart history ==
Number-one albums of 2023 in Finland
Week	Album	Artist(s)	Reference(s)
Week 1	Limbo	Costi	
Week 2	Sextape II	Sexmane	
Week 3	Neon Noir	VV	
Week 4	Vastustamaton	Gettomasa	
Week 5	Vastustamaton	Gettomasa	
Week 6	Vastustamaton	Gettomasa	
Week 7	Näkemiin, melankolia	Vesala	
Week 8	Vastustamaton	Gettomasa	
Week 9	Anno 1696	Insomnium	
Week 10	Vastustamaton	Gettomasa	
Week 11	Valeria	Arppa	
Week 12	Maailman onnellisin kansa	Maustetytöt	
Week 13	Vastustamaton	Gettomasa	
Week 14	Hyvikset ja pahikset	Kuumaa	
Week 15	Hyvikset ja pahikset	Kuumaa	
Week 16	72 Seasons	Metallica	
Week 17	Hyvikset ja pahikset	Kuumaa	
Week 18	Hyvikset ja pahikset	Kuumaa	
Week 19	Hyvikset ja pahikset	Kuumaa	
Week 20	Hyvikset ja pahikset	Kuumaa	
Week 21	Hyvikset ja pahikset	Kuumaa	
Week 22	Hyvikset ja pahikset	Kuumaa	
Week 23	Kävi miten kävi	Isac Elliot	
Week 24	Kävi miten kävi	Isac Elliot	
Week 25	Sisään ja ulos	Antti Tuisku	
Week 26	Sisään ja ulos	Antti Tuisku	
Week 27	Hyvikset ja pahikset	Kuumaa	
Week 28	Hyvikset ja pahikset	Kuumaa	
Week 29	Hyvikset ja pahikset	Kuumaa	
Week 30	Hyvikset ja pahikset	Kuumaa	
Week 31	Utopia	Travis Scott	
Week 32	Hyvikset ja pahikset	Kuumaa	
Week 33	Hyvikset ja pahikset	Kuumaa	
Week 34	Hyvikset ja pahikset	Kuumaa	
Week 35	Hyvikset ja pahikset	Kuumaa	
Week 36	Kertoimia vastaan	Jami Faltin	
Week 37	Kertoimia vastaan	Jami Faltin	
Week 38	Hupsis	Bee	
Week 39	Merkittävät erot	Behm	
Week 40	X	Stam1na	
Week 41	Merkittävät erot	Behm	
Week 42	Merkittävät erot	Behm	
Week 43	Euro Musik	Cledos	
Week 44	Aino	Lauri Haav	
Week 45	Räppäri	Ibe	
Week 46	Räppäri	Ibe	
Week 47	Räppäri	Ibe	
Week 48	Räppäri	Ibe	
Week 49	Räppäri	Ibe	
Week 50	Rebirth – Greatest Hits	Old Gods of Asgard	
Week 51	A Chapter Called Children of Bodom	Children of Bodom	
Week 52	Tulkoon joulu	Suvi Teräsniska	

== See also ==
- List of number-one singles of 2023 (Finland)
