= Chosen One (Gettomasa album) =

Studio album by Gettomasa
- Released: March 11, 2016
- Genres: Hip hop, rap
- Length: 51:11
- Language: Finnish
- Labels: Warner Music Finland, PME Records
- Producer: Ruuben

Gettomasa chronology
Vellamo LP (2014)	Chosen One (2016)	17 EP (2017)

Chosen One is Finnish rapper Gettomasa's second album and first studio album, released on March 11, 2016. It was released via Warner Music Finland and PME Records and mostly produced by Ruuben. The album features Tupla-P, Kemmuru, Stepa, Davo, Gracias, VilleGalle, and Tippa-T.

The track "Pelkuri" received special praise for Gettomasa sharing about his problematic relationship with his alcoholic father while growing up. The album peaked at number 18 on the Finnish album charts and received attention on social media.

== Track listing ==
1. Chosen One (featuring Tupla-P) – 4:41
2. Ota kiini jos saat – 3:12
3. Kuulokkeet – 3:48
4. Cancelled (Interlude) – 2:28
5. Missä oot poika? (featuring Kemmuru) – 4:20
6. Kato meitä nyt – 3:41
7. Sä tiiät – 3:17
8. Sama jätkä (featuring Stepa) – 3:58
9. Menossa (featuring Davo, Gracias, VilleGalle, Tippa-T) – 3:20
10. Kuka – 3:15
11. Pelkuri – 9:06
12. Katumuksii – 5:57
