= List of number-one albums of 2022 (Finland) =

This is the complete list of number-one albums in Finland in 2022 according to the Official Finnish Charts compiled by Musiikkituottajat. The chart is based on sales of physical and digital albums as well as music streaming.

== Chart history ==
Number-one albums of 2022 in Finland
Physical and digital albums
Week	Album	Artist(s)	Reference(s)
Week 1	Älä pelkää elämää	Haloo Helsinki!	
Week 2	Dawn FM	The Weeknd	
Week 3	Dawn FM	The Weeknd	
Week 4	Circus of Doom	Battle Beast	
Week 5	Teatro d'ira: Vol. I	Måneskin	
Week 6	Älä luovuta	Huora	
Week 7	Halo	Amorphis	
Week 8	Halo	Amorphis	
Week 9	When All the Rivers Are Silent	Diablo	
Week 10	The War to End All Wars	Sabaton	
Week 11	Impera	Ghost	
Week 12	Oddinary	Stray Kids	
Week 13	Parisuhdehautausmaa	Viivi	
Week 14	Soulavaris	J. Karjalainen	
Week 15	Soulavaris	J. Karjalainen	
Week 16	Kaukana kotoa	Pehmoaino	
Week 17	Kaukana kotoa	Pehmoaino	
Week 18	Zeit	Rammstein	
Week 19	Zeit	Rammstein	
Week 20	Mr. Morale & the Big Steppers	Kendrick Lamar	
Week 21	Harry's House	Harry Styles	
Week 22	Harry's House	Harry Styles	
Week 23	Harry's House	Harry Styles	
Week 24	Proof	BTS	
Week 25	Harry's House	Harry Styles	
Week 26	Harry's House	Harry Styles	
Week 27	Harry's House	Harry Styles	
Week 28	Lifestyles of the Sick & Dangerous	Blind Channel	
Week 29	Lifestyles of the Sick & Dangerous	Blind Channel	
Week 30	Harry's House	Harry Styles	
Week 31	The Urn – Complete Studio Recordings	Sentenced	
Week 32	Aivan kuin kaikki muutkin	Apulanta	
Week 33	Deceivers	Arch Enemy	
Week 34	AfterLife	Five Finger Death Punch	
Week 35	Tykkäät kummiski	Etta	
Week 36	The Sick, the Dying... and the Dead!	Megadeth	
Week 37	Ongelmalapsi	Fabe	
Week 38	Kaikella on tarkoitus	Lauri Tähkä	
Week 39	Survive	Stratovarius	
Week 40	Pelastetaan maailma	Samu Haber	
Week 41	Mun tapa pelata	JVG	
Week 42	Sielun kaltainen tuote	Apulanta	
Week 43	Midnights	Taylor Swift	
Week 44	Midnights	Taylor Swift	
Week 45	Vastustamaton	Gettomasa	
Week 46	Vastustamaton	Gettomasa	
Week 47	Vastustamaton	Gettomasa	
Week 48	Vastustamaton	Gettomasa	
Week 49	Vastustamaton	Gettomasa	
Week 50	Limbo	Costi	
Week 51	Limbo	Costi	
Week 52	Limbo	Costi	

== See also ==
- List of number-one singles of 2022 (Finland)
