= List of number-one albums of 2015 (Finland) =

This is the complete list of number-one albums sold in Finland in 2015 according to the Official Finnish Charts compiled by Musiikkituottajat – IFPI Finland. The chart is based on sales of physical and digital albums as well as music streaming.

== Chart history ==
Physical & digital albums
Week	Album	Artist(s)	Reference(s)
Week 1	Vain elämää – Kausi 3 ilta	Various artists	
Week 2	Vain elämää – Kausi 3 päivä	Various artists	
Week 3	Kiitos ei ole kirosana	Haloo Helsinki!	
Week 4	Unholy Savior	Battle Beast	
Week 5	Kiitos ei ole kirosana	Haloo Helsinki!	
Week 6	Mesmeria	CMX	
Week 7	Elävien kirjoihin	Mokoma	
Week 8	Elävien kirjoihin	Mokoma	
Week 9	One Man Army	Ensiferum	
Week 10	Kiitos ei ole kirosana	Haloo Helsinki!	
Week 11	Kiitos ei ole kirosana	Haloo Helsinki!	
Week 12	Kiitos ei ole kirosana	Haloo Helsinki!	
Week 13	New Day Rising	Von Hertzen Brothers	
Week 14	Endless Forms Most Beautiful	Nightwish	
Week 15	Endless Forms Most Beautiful	Nightwish	
Week 16	Endless Forms Most Beautiful	Nightwish	
Week 17	Malarian pelko	Paperi T	
Week 18	Lelu	Sanni	
Week 19	Lelu	Sanni	
Week 20	Endless Forms Most Beautiful	Nightwish	
Week 21	Sol Invictus	Faith No More	
Week 22	En kommentoi	Antti Tuisku	
Week 23	En kommentoi	Antti Tuisku	
Week 24	Drones	Muse	
Week 25	Drones	Muse	
Week 26	Skills in Pills	Lindemann	
Week 27	The Voice kesähitti 2015	Various artists	
Week 28	The Voice kesähitti 2015	Various artists	
Week 29	En kommentoi	Antti Tuisku	
Week 30	En kommentoi	Antti Tuisku	
Week 31	En kommentoi	Antti Tuisku	
Week 32	En kommentoi	Antti Tuisku	
Week 33	En kommentoi	Antti Tuisku	
Week 34	Pettymys	Pyhimys	
Week 35	Meliora	Ghost	
Week 36	Bad Magic	Motörhead	
Week 37	The Book of Souls	Iron Maiden	
Week 38	The Book of Souls	Iron Maiden	
Week 39	Silvër Horizon	Diablo	
Week 40	Diskovibrator	Turmion Kätilöt	
Week 41	I Worship Chaos	Children Of Bodom	
Week 42	Sinun vuorosi loistaa	Juha Tapio	
Week 43	Alpha Omega	Cheek	
Week 44	Alpha Omega	Cheek	
Week 45	Vain elämää - Kausi 4 päivä	Various Artists	
Week 46	Vain elämää - Kausi 4 päivä	Various Artists	
Week 47	Made in the A.M.	One Direction	
Week 48	25	Adele	
Week 49	25	Adele	
Week 50	25	Adele	
Week 51	25	Adele	
Week 52	25	Adele	
Week 53	25	Adele	

== See also ==
- List of number-one singles of 2015 (Finland)
