= List of number-one singles of 2019 (Finland) =

This is the complete list of number-one singles in Finland in 2019 according to the Official Finnish Charts. The list on the left side of the box (Suomen virallinen singlelista, "the Official Finnish Singles Chart") represents physical and digital track sales as well as music streaming, and the one on the right side (Suomen virallinen radiosoittolista, "the Official Finnish Airplay Chart") represents airplay.

== Chart history ==
Official Finnish Singles Chart				Official Finnish Airplay Chart			
Issue date	Song	Artist(s)	Reference(s)	Issue date	Song	Artist(s)	Reference(s)
Week 1	"Wow"	Post Malone		Week 1	"Made in Heaven"	Jenni Vartiainen	
Week 2	"Harmaa rinne"	Teflon Brothers		Week 2	"Sweet but Psycho"	Ava Max	
Week 3	"Harmaa rinne"	Teflon Brothers		Week 3	"Sweet but Psycho"	Ava Max	
Week 4	"7 Rings"	Ariana Grande		Week 4	"Sweet but Psycho"	Ava Max	
Week 5	"7 Rings"	Ariana Grande		Week 5	"Sweet but Psycho"	Ava Max	
Week 6	"7 Rings"	Ariana Grande		Week 6	"Palavaa vettä"	Lauri Tähkä	
Week 7	"7 Rings"	Ariana Grande		Week 7	—		
Week 8	"Ikuinen vappu"	JVG		Week 8	"Palavaa vettä"	Lauri Tähkä	
Week 9	"Ikuinen vappu"	JVG		Week 9	"Nothing Breaks Like a Heart"	Mark Ronson (featuring Miley Cyrus)	
Week 10	"Ikuinen vappu"	JVG		Week 10	"Palavaa vettä"	Lauri Tähkä	
Week 11	"Ikuinen vappu"	JVG		Week 11	"Palavaa vettä"	Lauri Tähkä	
Week 12	"Ikuinen vappu"	JVG		Week 12	"Palavaa vettä"	Lauri Tähkä	
Week 13	"Ikuinen vappu"	JVG		Week 13	"Palavaa vettä"	Lauri Tähkä	
Week 14	"Ikuinen vappu"	JVG		Week 14	"Palavaa vettä"	Lauri Tähkä	
Week 15	"Bad Guy"	Billie Eilish		Week 15	"Palavaa vettä"	Lauri Tähkä	
Week 16	"SOS"	Avicii (featuring Aloe Blacc)		Week 16	"Palavaa vettä"	Lauri Tähkä	
Week 17	"Ikuinen vappu"	JVG		Week 17	"Palavaa vettä"	Lauri Tähkä	
Week 18	"Ikuinen vappu"	JVG		Week 18	"Palavaa vettä"	Lauri Tähkä	
Week 19	"Ikuinen vappu"	JVG		Week 19	"Palavaa vettä"	Lauri Tähkä	
Week 20	"I Don't Care"	Ed Sheeran and Justin Bieber		Week 20	"Palavaa vettä"	Lauri Tähkä	
Week 21	"I Don't Care"	Ed Sheeran and Justin Bieber		Week 21	"Palavaa vettä"	Lauri Tähkä	
Week 22	"Ikuinen vappu"	JVG		Week 22	"Palavaa vettä"	Lauri Tähkä	
Week 23	"Frisbee"	JVG		Week 23	"Palavaa vettä"	Lauri Tähkä	
Week 24	"Frisbee"	JVG		Week 24	"SOS"	Avicii (featuring Aloe Blacc)	
Week 25	"Frisbee"	JVG		Week 25	"Suomen muotoisen pilven alla"	Arttu Wiskari	
Week 26	"Frisbee"	JVG		Week 26	"SOS"	Avicii (featuring Aloe Blacc)	
Week 27	"Señorita"	Shawn Mendes and Camila Cabello		Week 27	"SOS"	Avicii (featuring Aloe Blacc)	
Week 28	"Señorita"	Shawn Mendes and Camila Cabello		Week 28	"SOS"	Avicii (featuring Aloe Blacc)	
Week 29	"Señorita"	Shawn Mendes and Camila Cabello		Week 29	"SOS"	Avicii (featuring Aloe Blacc)	
Week 30	"Señorita"	Shawn Mendes and Camila Cabello		Week 30	"SOS"	Avicii (featuring Aloe Blacc)	
Week 31	"Señorita"	Shawn Mendes and Camila Cabello		Week 31	"I Don't Care"	Ed Sheeran and Justin Bieber	
Week 32	"Señorita"	Shawn Mendes and Camila Cabello		Week 32	"I Don't Care"	Ed Sheeran and Justin Bieber	
Week 33	"Muistuta mua"	Pyhimys		Week 33	"I Don't Care"	Ed Sheeran and Justin Bieber	
Week 34	"Muistuta mua"	Pyhimys		Week 34	"Suomen muotoisen pilven alla"	Arttu Wiskari	
Week 35	"Dance Monkey"	Tones and I		Week 35	"On the Beach"	Jubël	
Week 36	"Dance Monkey"	Tones and I		Week 36	"Señorita"	Shawn Mendes and Camila Cabello	
Week 37	"Dance Monkey"	Tones and I		Week 37	"Señorita"	Shawn Mendes and Camila Cabello	
Week 38	"Dance Monkey"	Tones and I		Week 38	"Señorita"	Shawn Mendes and Camila Cabello	
Week 39	"Dance Monkey"	Tones and I		Week 39	"Señorita"	Shawn Mendes and Camila Cabello	
Week 40	"Dance Monkey"	Tones and I		Week 40	"Señorita"	Shawn Mendes and Camila Cabello	
Week 41	"Dance Monkey"	Tones and I		Week 41	"Haluun olla yksin"	Irina	
Week 42	"Dance Monkey"	Tones and I		Week 42	"Haluun olla yksin"	Irina	
Week 43	"Dance Monkey"	Tones and I		Week 43	"Haluun olla yksin"	Irina	
Week 44	"Hei rakas"	Behm		Week 44	"Haluun olla yksin"	Irina	
Week 45	"V!@%#mikko"	Pyhimys		Week 45	"Haluun olla yksin"	Irina	
Week 46	"V!@%#mikko"	Pyhimys		Week 46	"Sano mulle jotain kaunista"	Katri Ylander	
Week 47	"Hei rakas"	Behm		Week 47	"Haluun olla yksin"	Irina	
Week 48	"Hei rakas"	Behm		Week 48	"Haluun olla yksin"	Irina	
Week 49	"Hei rakas"	Behm		Week 49	"Haluun olla yksin"	Irina	
Week 50	"Hei rakas"	Behm		Week 50	"Haluun olla yksin"	Irina	
Week 51	"Hei rakas"	Behm		Week 51	"Muistuta mua"	Pyhimys	
Week 52	"All I Want for Christmas Is You"	Mariah Carey		Week 52	"Last Christmas"	Wham!	

== See also ==
- List of number-one albums of 2019 (Finland)
