= List of number-one singles of 2023 (Finland) =

This is the complete list of number-one singles in Finland in 2023 according to the Official Finnish Charts. The list on the left side of the box (Suomen virallinen singlelista, "the Official Finnish Singles Chart") represents physical and digital track sales as well as music streaming, and the one on the right side (Suomen virallinen radiosoittolista, "the Official Finnish Airplay Chart") represents airplay.

== Chart history ==
List of number-one singles of 2023 in Finland
Official Finnish Singles Chart				Official Finnish Airplay Chart			
Issue date	Song	Artist(s)	Reference(s)	Issue date	Song	Artist(s)	Reference(s)
Week 1	"I'm Good (Blue)"	David Guetta and Bebe Rexha		Week 1	"Sydän sulaa"	Evelina	
Week 2	"Äärirajoille II"	Sexmane		Week 2	"I'm Good (Blue)"	David Guetta and Bebe Rexha	
Week 3	"Sata vuotta"	Behm		Week 3	"I'm Good (Blue)"	David Guetta and Bebe Rexha	
Week 4	"Flowers"	Miley Cyrus		Week 4	"I'm Good (Blue)"	David Guetta and Bebe Rexha	
Week 5	"Flowers"	Miley Cyrus		Week 5	"Ihana kipu"	Viivi and Robin Packalen	
Week 6	"Ylivoimainen"	Kuumaa		Week 6	"Tulipalo"	Kuumaa	
Week 7	"Kilsoi"	Cledos		Week 7	"Tulipalo"	Kuumaa	
Week 8	"Ylivoimainen"	Kuumaa		Week 8	"Tulipalo"	Kuumaa	
Week 9	"Cha Cha Cha"	Käärijä		Week 9	"Tulipalo"	Kuumaa	
Week 10	"Cha Cha Cha"	Käärijä		Week 10	"Tulipalo"	Kuumaa	
Week 11	"Maailman ympäri"	Costi		Week 11	"Tulipalo"	Kuumaa	
Week 12	"Maailman ympäri"	Costi		Week 12	"Tulipalo"	Kuumaa	
Week 13	"Maailman ympäri"	Costi		Week 13	"Tulipalo"	Kuumaa	
Week 14	"Meit ei oo"	Gettomasa		Week 14	"Forget Me"	Lewis Capaldi	
Week 15	"Meit ei oo"	Gettomasa		Week 15	"Forget Me"	Lewis Capaldi	
Week 16	"Meit ei oo"	Gettomasa		Week 16	"Forget Me"	Lewis Capaldi	
Week 17	"Meit ei oo"	Gettomasa		Week 17	"Forget Me"	Lewis Capaldi	
Week 18	"Cha Cha Cha"	Käärijä		Week 18	"Kohti sydänpeltoja"	Vesterinen Yhtyeineen	
Week 19	"Cha Cha Cha"	Käärijä		Week 19	"Cha Cha Cha"	Käärijä	
Week 20	"Cha Cha Cha"	Käärijä		Week 20	"Cha Cha Cha"	Käärijä	
Week 21	"Cha Cha Cha"	Käärijä		Week 21	"Ylivoimainen"	Kuumaa	
Week 22	"Cha Cha Cha"	Käärijä		Week 22	"Ylivoimainen"	Kuumaa	
Week 23	"Jälkeekään"	Gettomasa		Week 23	"Ylivoimainen"	Kuumaa	
Week 24	"Jälkeekään"	Gettomasa		Week 24	"Ylivoimainen"	Kuumaa	
Week 25	"Jälkeekään"	Gettomasa		Week 25	"Ylivoimainen"	Kuumaa	
Week 26	"Cha Cha Cha"	Käärijä		Week 26	"Ylivoimainen"	Kuumaa	
Week 27	"Cha Cha Cha"	Käärijä		Week 27	"Ylivoimainen"	Kuumaa	
Week 28	"Blondina"	Ibe		Week 28	"Ylivoimainen"	Kuumaa	
Week 29	"Blondina"	Ibe		Week 29	"Ylivoimainen"	Kuumaa	
Week 30	"Blondina"	Ibe		Week 30	"Ylivoimainen"	Kuumaa	
Week 31	"Blondina"	Ibe		Week 31	"Ylivoimainen"	Kuumaa	
Week 32	"Blondina"	Ibe		Week 32	"Ylivoimainen"	Kuumaa	
Week 33	"Blondina"	Ibe		Week 33	"Viimeinen tanssi"	Behm and Olavi Uusivirta	
Week 34	"Blondina"	Ibe		Week 34	"Viimeinen tanssi"	Behm and Olavi Uusivirta	
Week 35	"Blondina"	Ibe		Week 35	"Viimeinen tanssi"	Behm and Olavi Uusivirta	
Week 36	"Kertoimia vastaan"	Jami Faltin		Week 36	"Viimeinen tanssi"	Behm and Olavi Uusivirta	
Week 37	"Kertoimia vastaan"	Jami Faltin		Week 37	"Viimeinen tanssi"	Behm and Olavi Uusivirta	
Week 38	"Taulut"	Hugo (featuring Costi)		Week 38	"Viimeinen tanssi"	Behm and Olavi Uusivirta	
Week 39	"Taulut"	Hugo (featuring Costi)		Week 39	"Viimeinen tanssi"	Behm and Olavi Uusivirta	
Week 40	"Kiireinen nainen"	Turisti (featuring Ibe)		Week 40	"Viimeinen tanssi"	Behm and Olavi Uusivirta	
Week 41	"Taulut"	Hugo (featuring Costi)		Week 41	"Viimeinen tanssi"	Behm and Olavi Uusivirta	
Week 42	"Ghetto Love"	Averagekidluke and Ibe		Week 42	"Viimeinen tanssi"	Behm and Olavi Uusivirta	
Week 43	"Taulut"	Hugo (featuring Costi)		Week 43	"Mitä näil korteil saa?"	Viivi (featuring JVG)	
Week 44	"Taulut"	Hugo (featuring Costi)		Week 44	"Mitä näil korteil saa?"	Viivi (featuring JVG)	
Week 45	"Taulut"	Hugo (featuring Costi)		Week 45	"Mitä näil korteil saa?"	Viivi (featuring JVG)	
Week 46	"Silkkii"	Davi (featuring Joalin)		Week 46	"Mitä näil korteil saa?"	Viivi (featuring JVG)	
Week 47	"Silkkii"	Davi (featuring Joalin)		Week 47	"Mitä näil korteil saa?"	Viivi (featuring JVG)	
Week 48	"Taulut"	Hugo (featuring Costi)		Week 48	"Pimee"	Elastinen (featuring Bess)	
Week 49	"Jos mä oisin sä"	Cledos		Week 49	"Viimeisiä sanoja"	Bee	
Week 50	"Väärään aikaan"	Ahti (featuring Hugo)		Week 50	"Viimeisiä sanoja"	Bee	
Week 51	"Väärään aikaan"	Ahti (featuring Hugo)		Week 51	"Viimeisiä sanoja"	Bee	
Week 52	"Väärään aikaan"	Ahti (featuring Hugo)		Week 52	"Pimee"	Elastinen (featuring Bess)	

== See also ==
- List of number-one albums of 2023 (Finland)
