= Vastustamaton =

Studio album by Gettomasa
- Released: November 4, 2022
- Genre: Hip hop
- Length: 38:36
- Language: Finnish
- Label: PME Records, KPC Records
- Producer: Ruuben, MD$, GoodJobLarry, Xrphan, Fractious Frank, Aleksi Asiala, Skywalk

Gettomasa chronology
| Kalamies (2020) | Vastustamaton (2022) |

Vastustamaton is Finnish rapper Gettomasa's fifth album and fourth studio album. The album was released on November 4, 2022, via PME Records. The album features Van Hegen and Lauri Haav.

The album won Rap/R&B Album of the Year at the Emma-gaala, as well as the single "Shamppanjadietillä" being a choice for Song of the Year. Notably, the album was also number one on Finland's official album chart for a total of 11 weeks.

== Track listing ==
1. Ne otti hoon pois – 2:59
2. Vastustamaton – 3:38
3. Shamppanjadietillä (featuring Van Hegen) – 2:34
4. Kombo – 2:38
5. Ei leiki – 3:24
6. 500 Hevosta – 3:54
7. Hyvä me – 3:06
8. Kierrän sen kaukaa – 3:03
9. Se ois ollu siin – 6:12
10. Rantatontti (featuring Lauri Haav) – 3:26
11. Hölliikse – 3:38
