= List of number-one singles of 2007 (Finland) =

This is the complete list of (physical and digital) number-one singles sold in Finland in 2007 according to the Official Finnish Charts. The list on the left side of the box (Suomen virallinen singlelista, "the Official Finnish Singles Chart") represents both physical and digital track sales and the one on the right side (Suomen virallinen latauslista, "the Official Finnish Download Chart") represents sales of digital tracks.

NB! The digital downloads have been tracked for charts since week 5 of 2007. From week 40 onwards, they have also counted towards the singles chart.

== Chart history ==
Official Finnish Singles Chart				Official Finnish Download Chart			
Issue date	Song	Artist(s)	Ref	Issue date	Song	Artist(s)	Ref
Week 1	"Koneeseen kadonnut"	Apulanta		Week 1	N/A	N/A	N/A
Week 2	"Different World"	Iron Maiden		Week 2	N/A	N/A	N/A
Week 3	"Koneeseen kadonnut"	Apulanta		Week 3	N/A	N/A	N/A
Week 4	"Proper Education"	Eric Prydz vs. Floyd		Week 4	N/A	N/A	N/A
Week 5	"Perfect Skin"	The 69 Eyes		Week 5	"Boten Anna"	Basshunter	
Week 6	"Summer Wine"	Ville Valo & Natalia Avelon		Week 6	"Koneeseen kadonnut"	Apulanta	
Week 7	"One More Magic Potion"	Ensiferum		Week 7	"Koneeseen kadonnut"	Apulanta	
Week 8	"Ne Plus Ultra"	Pain Confessor		Week 8	"Relax, Take It Easy"	Mika	
Week 9	"No Way Back (EP)"	Norther		Week 9	"Forever Yours"	Sunrise Avenue	
Week 10	"Tuonelan koivut"	Kotiteollisuus		Week 10	"Forever Yours"	Sunrise Avenue	
Week 11	"Joku raja"	PMMP		Week 11	"Summer Wine"	Ville Valo & Natalia Avelon	
Week 12	"Fading Yourself"	Negative		Week 12	"Summer Wine"	Ville Valo & Natalia Avelon	
Week 13	"Lycantrophy"	Feiled		Week 13	"Summer Wine"	Ville Valo & Natalia Avelon	
Week 14	"Sun täytyy"	Cheek (feat. Sami Saari)		Week 14	"Pop-musiikkia"	Idols 2007 finalists	
Week 15	"Guilty"	De Souza (featuring Shèna)		Week 15	"On Top of the World"	Ari Koivunen	
Week 16	"Tell Me"	Darude		Week 16	"On Top of the World"	Ari Koivunen	
Week 17	"Tell Me"	Darude		Week 17	"Summer Wine"	Ville Valo & Natalia Avelon	
Week 18	"Paid in Full"	Sonata Arctica		Week 18	"Piano Man"	Ari Koivunen	
Week 19	"Like a Superstar"	Dallas Superstars		Week 19	"Summer Wine"	Ville Valo & Natalia Avelon	
Week 20	"Welcome to Hellsinki"	Judge Bone's Original Monstervision Freakshow		Week 20	"Summer Wine"	Ville Valo & Natalia Avelon	
Week 21	"Fashion"	Hanoi Rocks		Week 21	"Summer Wine"	Ville Valo & Natalia Avelon	
Week 22	"Satukirjan sankari"	Yö		Week 22	"Umbrella"	Rihanna (feat. Jay-Z)	
Week 23	"Teutonic Witch"	Reverend Bizarre		Week 23	"Eva"	Nightwish	
Week 24	"Smile for Me"	Ves Rain		Week 24	"Umbrella"	Rihanna (feat. Jay-Z)	
Week 25	"Kummitusjuna (EP)"	Kotiteollisuus		Week 25	"Lapin kesä"	Kristian Meurman	
Week 26	"Kill the Radio"	White Flame		Week 26	"Umbrella"	Rihanna (feat. Jay-Z)	
Week 27	"Jokainen hetki historian"	Eppu Normaali		Week 27	"Umbrella"	Rihanna (feat. Jay-Z)	
Week 28	"Hetkeksi en sulle rupia"	Lauri Tähkä & Elonkerjuu		Week 28	"Umbrella"	Rihanna (feat. Jay-Z)	
Week 29	"Hetkeksi en sulle rupia"	Lauri Tähkä & Elonkerjuu		Week 29	"Everlasting Bomb"	Widescreen Mode	
Week 30	"Tytöt tykkää"	Tea		Week 30	"Everlasting Bomb"	Widescreen Mode	
Week 31	"Tytöt tykkää"	Tea		Week 31	"Everlasting Bomb"	Widescreen Mode	
Week 32	"Tytöt tykkää"	Tea		Week 32	"End of Love"	Anna Abreu	
Week 33	"Tytöt tykkää"	Tea		Week 33	"Everlasting Bomb"	Widescreen Mode	
Week 34	"Kummitusjuna (EP)"	Kotiteollisuus		Week 34	"Everlasting Bomb"	Widescreen Mode	
Week 35	"Amaranth"	Nightwish		Week 35	"End of Love"	Anna Abreu	
Week 36	"Amaranth"	Nightwish		Week 36	"Pauhaava sydän"	Lauri Tähkä & Elonkerjuu	
Week 37	"Amaranth"	Nightwish		Week 37	"Pauhaava sydän"	Lauri Tähkä & Elonkerjuu	
Week 38	"Lasten liikennelaulu"	various artists		Week 38	"Everlasting Bomb"	Widescreen Mode	
Week 39	"Amaranth"	Nightwish		Week 39	"Pauhaava sydän"	Lauri Tähkä & Elonkerjuu	
Week 40	"Amaranth"	Nightwish		Week 40	"Amaranth"	Nightwish	
Week 41	"Amaranth"	Nightwish		Week 41	"Amaranth"	Nightwish	
Week 42	"Amaranth"	Nightwish		Week 42	"Amaranth"	Nightwish	
Week 43	"Amaranth"	Nightwish		Week 43	"Ihmisten edessä"	Jenni Vartiainen	
Week 44	"Amaranth"	Nightwish		Week 44	"Amaranth"	Nightwish	
Week 45	"Tired of Being Sorry"	Enrique Iglesias		Week 45	"Tired of Being Sorry"	Enrique Iglesias	
Week 46	"Pelimiehet on kortilla"	Mr. Nordic Bet		Week 46	"Indian"	Sturm und Drang	
Week 47	"Orret/Teuvo"	Viikate		Week 47	"Indian"	Sturm und Drang	
Week 48	"Indian"	Sturm und Drang		Week 48	"Indian"	Sturm und Drang	
Week 49	"Indian"	Sturm und Drang		Week 49	"Indian"	Sturm und Drang	
Week 50	"Erämaan viimeinen"	Nightwish (feat. Jonsu)		Week 50	"Dead Inside"	Widescreen Mode	
Week 51	"Päästänkö irti"	Ismo Alanko		Week 51	"Indian"	Sturm und Drang	
Week 52	"Lasten liikennelaulu"	various artists		Week 52	N/A	N/A	N/A

== See also ==
- List of number-one albums of 2007 (Finland)
