= Maustetytöt =

Finnish girl group

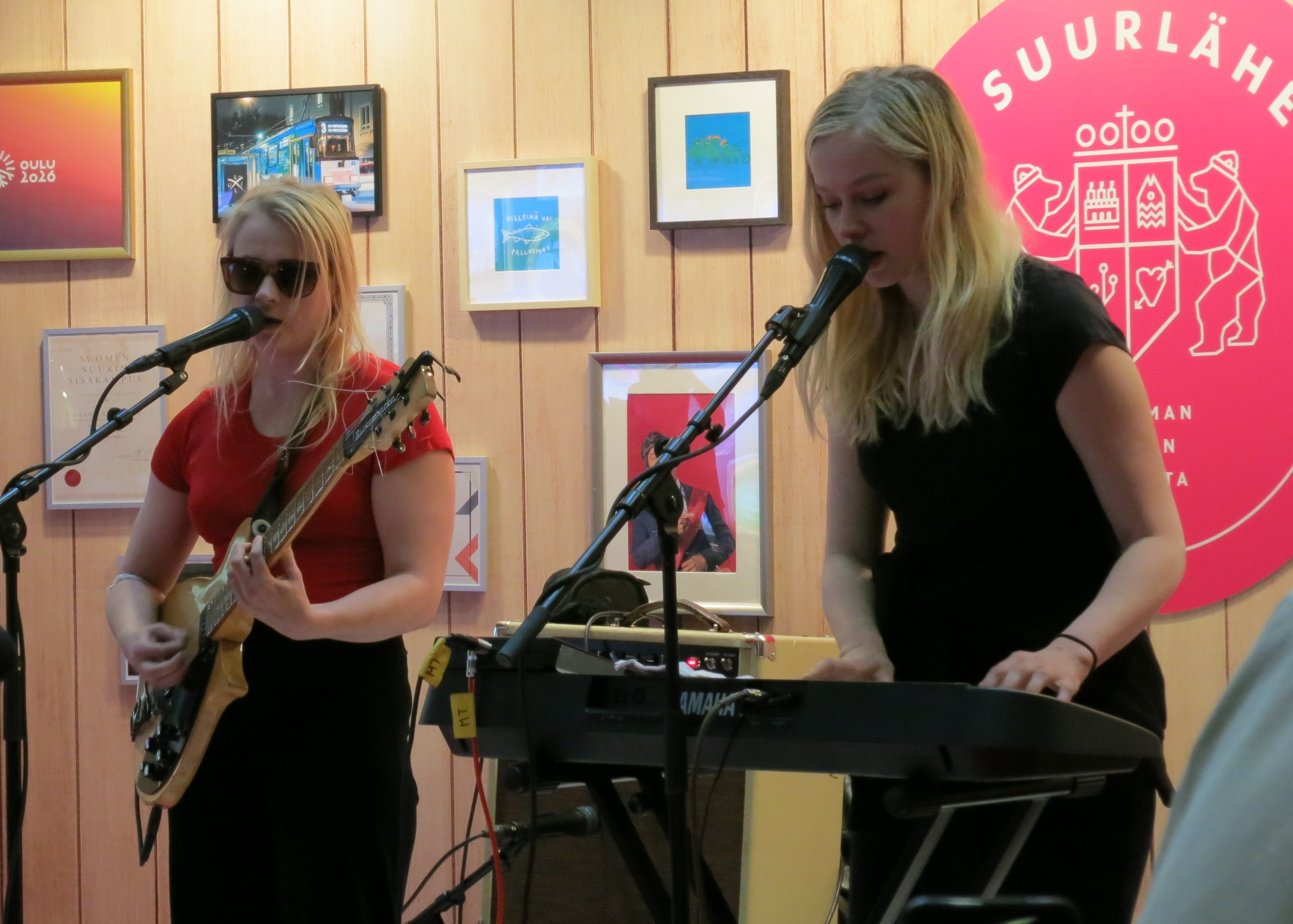
- Maustetytöt at the Kamppi Center in Helsinki, 2019

Background information
- Origin: Finland
- Genres: Pop; Schlager
- Years active: 2017–present
- Members: Anna Karjalainen; Kaisa Karjalainen
- Website: www.maustetytot.fi

Maustetytöt (Finnish pronunciation: [ˈmɑu̯stetˌtytøt]; lit. 'spice girls') is a Finnish girl group consisting of sisters Anna Karjalainen and Kaisa Karjalainen. The band's trademarks include a laconic and serious-looking performance style.

Originally from Vaala, the Karjalainen sisters first performed under the name Kaneli, with a third sister, Maija, on drums; they released one EP, Tommy's Broken Guitar (2012) and an album, Hazy Days (2016). 'Kaneli' is the Finnish word for cinnamon and the name 'Maustetytöt' is a reference to this.

Maustetytöt claim to listen to traditional Finnish schlager, and suggest their role model is Leevi and the Leavings. The band's record company Is This Art! describes Maustetytöt as an "indie pop duo".

Maustetytöt won the Rock of the Year and Band of the Year awards at the Emma Awards in 2020. Oskari Onninen from Helsingin Sanomat describes the band as "downright suspiciously 'authentic' and non-commercial". According to Antti Luukkanen from Soundi, the songs contain "everyday realism and the glamour of downright misery".

Maustetytöt achieved international fame when they appeared in Aki Kaurismäki's 2023 film Fallen Leaves, performing the song "Syntynyt suruun ja puettu pettymyksin" ("Born in sorrow and clothed in disappointment"). The song was popularised in Poland by Radio 357, one of the biggest patron-financed initiative in Poland, and it reached number 3 at its record chart in January 2026, staying a hundred weeks on the top thirty hit list. According to critic Esther Zuckerman from The New York Times, Maustetytöt is an "impossibly cool modern Finnish duo". Also, Bilge Ebiri from Vulture finds the Maustetytöt part in the film a "showstopping appearance". With the publicity brought by the film, Maustetytöt has accumulated many foreign music tours, such as in Sweden and Germany.

== Discography ==
=== Albums ===
Year	Album	Peak positions
Year	Album	FIN
2019	Kaikki tiet vievät Peltolaan ("All Roads Lead to Peltola")	1
2020	Eivät enkelitkään ilman siipiä lennä ("Even Angels Can't Fly Without Wings")	2
2023	Maailman onnellisin kansa ("Happiest Nation in the World")	1
2026	Itken jos mua huvittaa ("I Cry If I Feel Like It")	1

== See also ==
- List of number-one albums of 2019 (Finland)
- List of number-one albums of 2023 (Finland)
