= Diplomaatti =

Studio album by Gettomasa
- Released: May 24, 2019
- Genres: Hip hop, rap
- Length: 26:23
- Language: Finnish
- Label: PME Records
- Producers: Ruuben, MD$, LX-Beats, Matti Laukkanen

Gettomasa chronology
17 EP (2017)	Diplomaatti (2019)	Kalamies (2020)

Diplomaatti is Finnish rapper Gettomasa's third album and second studio album, released on May 24, 2019. The album features Lauri Haav and Joosu J. The album was awarded Rap/R&B Album of the Year at the Emma-gaala, and was able to get number 1 on the Finnish album chart. On October 10, 2019, it was certified platinum after being streamed 20 million times.

== Track listing ==
1. Silmät – 3:49
2. Muijii stadis – 4:04
3. Räkis – 3:15
4. Voi ei (featuring Lauri Haav) – 3:54
5. Pressoi – 4:22
6. Enempää – 3:03
7. Diplomaatti (featuring Joosu J) – 4:36
