= Valittu kansa =

Studio album by Antti Tuisku
- Released: 7 February 2020
- Language: Finnish
- Label: Warner Music Finland

Antti Tuisku chronology
Anatude (2017)	Valittu kansa (2020)

Valittu kansa is the twelfth studio album by Finnish pop singer Antti Tuisku, released on 7 February 2020 through Warner Music Finland. The album received positive reviews from critics; Oskari Onninen from Helsingin Sanomat called it "an exceptional Finnish pop effort and a five-star album", while Jukka Hätinen, writing for Rumba, described it as "a provocative pop diamond".

In its first week of release, the album entered the Finnish Albums Chart at number one, becoming Tuisku's sixth number-one album.

== Track listing ==
Valittu kansa track listing
No.	Title	Length
1.	"Kerran vuodes kirkkoon"	3:43
2.	"Valittu kansa"	3:57
3.	"Bailantai"	3:45
4.	"Häitä ja hautajaisii"	3:09
5.	"Pyhä kosketus"	3:33
6.	"Jesse on mun frendi"	4:35
7.	"Pidä tunkkis"	3:00
8.	"Mistä minä tiedän"	3:51
9.	"Jumalan kämmenellä"	2:54
10.	"Kahvia ja pullaa"	3:46
11.	"Sit ku me kuollaan"	4:12

== Charts ==
Sales chart performance for Valittu kansa
Chart (2020)	Peak position
Finnish Albums (Suomen virallinen lista)	1

== Release history ==
Release formats for Valittu kansa
Region	Date	Format	Label
Finland	7 February 2020	CD, digital download	Warner Music Finland

== See also ==
- List of 2020 albums
- List of number-one albums of 2020 (Finland)
