= En kommentoi =

Studio album by Antti Tuisku
- Released: 22 May 2015
- Language: Finnish
- Label: Warner Music Finland
- Producer: Jurek

Antti Tuisku chronology
Toisenlainen tie (2011)	En kommentoi (2015)	Anatude (2017)

Singles from En kommentoi
- 1. "Peto on irti" Released: 20 February 2015; 2. "Blaablaa (En kuule sanaakaan)" Released: 10 April 2015

En kommentoi (No Comments) is the tenth studio album by Finnish pop singer Antti Tuisku. It was released on 22 May 2015 through Warner Music Finland and became Tuisku's fourth number one album on the Finnish Albums Chart. The album was produced by Simo "Jurek" Reunamäki, and it received positive reviews from critics as well as two Emma Awards. A deluxe version of the album was released on 22 April 2016, featuring three additional singles, "Party (Papiidipaadi)", "Pyydä multa anteeks kunnolla" and "Suurin fani".

== Background ==
After finishing his 10-year anniversary tour in December 2013, Tuisku began to have doubts of the direction his career was going in. With a request in mind from his record company to return with a song that would leave no one unaware of his comeback, Tuisku, his producer Simo "Jurek" Reunamäki and songwriter Kalle Lindroth went for a retreat in Jyväskylä to work on new material. Tuisku explains that he wanted the first single, "Peto on irti", to be the song that would take him to new level while being funny and self ironic. "I really wanted to be Finland's Justin Timberlake who will divide opinions."

== Release and promotion ==
To promote the album, Tuisku embarked on a Peto on irti concert tour in November 2015. In December he announced that he would put on a special concert titled "Peto Show" at Hartwall Arena on 23 May 2016. The tickets were sold out instantly, and the second show was scheduled for the following day.

== Singles ==
Two official singles were released from the album. "Peto on irti" reached number five on the Finnish Singles Chart and number one on the Download Chart, while the second single, "Blaablaa (En kuule sanaakaan)", peaked at number three on the Download Chart. "Keinutaan", featuring rapper VilleGalle, was released as a promotional single, and peaked at number three on both charts.

== Reception ==
In his positive review for Soundi, Eero Tarmo noted that unlike Tuisku's previous albums, En kommentoi is filled with unusually heavy layer of sexual undertones. He points out that the theme of the album appears to be encouraging oneself to accept who they really are. Ilkka Mattila from Helsingin Sanomat declared the album as Tuisku's best effort so far. He wrote that previously Tuisku had been more interesting for his personality, rather than for his music, but this time there are aspects of newlyfound self-confidence and cleverness, and musically traditional pop harmonies with modern edge. The album was a commercial success, topping the Finnish Albums Chart for nine non-consecutive weeks.

On 11 March 2016, the album received two Emma Awards, for the "Best Pop Album" and "Album of the Year". Tuisku was additionally awarded as the "Male Singer of the Year".

== Track listing ==
No.	Title	Length
1.	"En kommentoi"	3:06
2.	"Peto on irti"	3:33
3.	"Blaablaa (En kuule sanaakaan)"	3:43
4.	"Keinutaan" (featuring VilleGalle)	3:43
5.	"Hei ho paita pois"	3:43
6.	"Hiton pelkuri"	3:43
7.	"Veli" (featuring Mikael Gabriel)	3:41
8.	"Saikkuu"	3:44
9.	"Ihan sairasta mutta oikeesti kuulumme yhteen"	4:07
10.	"En huuda sun perään"	3:56

== Charts ==
Chart (2015)	Peak position
Finnish Albums (Suomen virallinen lista)	1

== Release history ==
Region	Date	Format	Label
Finland	22 May 2015	CD, digital download	Warner Music Finland

== See also ==
- List of number-one albums of 2015 (Finland)
