= List of number-one albums of 2007 (Finland) =

This is the complete list of (physical) number-one albums sold in Finland in 2007 according to Finland's Official List composed by Suomen Ääni- ja kuvatallennetuottajat ÄKT (since late August 2010, known as Musiikkituottajat – IFPI Finland).

== Chart history ==
Issue date	Album	Artist(s)	Reference(s)
Week 1	Völkerball	Rammstein	
Week 2	Völkerball	Rammstein	
Week 3	Otteita Tuomari Nurmion laulukirjasta	Sielun Veljet	
Week 4	Marraskuun lauluja I	Viikate	
Week 5	Marraskuun lauluja I	Viikate	
Week 6	Not Too Late	Norah Jones	
Week 7	Eikä vielä ole edes ilta	Apulanta	
Week 8	Eikä vielä ole edes ilta	Apulanta	
Week 9	Eikä vielä ole edes ilta	Apulanta	
Week 10	Angels	The 69 Eyes	
Week 11	Eikä vielä ole edes ilta	Apulanta	
Week 12	Idols 2007	various artists	
Week 13	Idols 2007	various artists	
Week 14	Liiba Laaba	Irina	
Week 15	Idols 2007	various artists	
Week 16	Idols 2007	various artists	
Week 17	Kuin taivaisiin	Kari Tapio	
Week 18	Laulut ja tarinat	Seminaarinmäen mieslaulajat	
Week 19	Parempi loppu	Jonna Tervomaa	
Week 20	Kuin taivaisiin	Kari Tapio	
Week 21	Minutes to Midnight	Linkin Park	
Week 22	Unia	Sonata Arctica	
Week 23	Fuel for the Fire	Ari Koivunen	
Week 24	Fuel for the Fire	Ari Koivunen	
Week 25	Fuel for the Fire	Ari Koivunen	
Week 26	Fuel for the Fire	Ari Koivunen	
Week 27	Fuel for the Fire	Ari Koivunen	
Week 28	Fuel for the Fire	Ari Koivunen	
Week 29	Fuel for the Fire	Ari Koivunen	
Week 30	Fuel for the Fire	Ari Koivunen	
Week 31	Fuel for the Fire	Ari Koivunen	
Week 32	Fuel for the Fire	Ari Koivunen	
Week 33	Fuel for the Fire	Ari Koivunen	
Week 34	Fuel for the Fire	Ari Koivunen	
Week 35	Anna Abreu	Anna Abreu	
Week 36	Valtakunta	Yö	
Week 37	Syvään päähän	Eppu Normaali	
Week 38	Syvään päähän	Eppu Normaali	
Week 39	Tuhannen riemua	Lauri Tähkä & Elonkerjuu	
Week 40	Dark Passion Play	Nightwish	
Week 41	Dark Passion Play	Nightwish	
Week 42	Dark Passion Play	Nightwish	
Week 43	Dark Passion Play	Nightwish	
Week 44	Dark Passion Play	Nightwish	
Week 45	Inari	Vesa-Matti Loiri	
Week 46	Inari	Vesa-Matti Loiri	
Week 47	My Winter Storm	Tarja Turunen	
Week 48	Virsiä	Samuli Edelmann	
Week 49	Luihin ja ytimiin	Mokoma	
Week 50	Virsiä	Samuli Edelmann	
Week 51	Virsiä	Samuli Edelmann	
Week 52	Virsiä	Samuli Edelmann	

== See also ==
- List of number-one singles of 2007 (Finland)
