= Anatude =

Studio album by Antti Tuisku
- Released: 15 September 2017
- Language: Finnish
- Label: Warner Music Finland

Antti Tuisku chronology
En kommentoi (2015)	Anatude (2017)	Valittu kansa (2020)

Anatude is the eleventh studio album by Finnish pop singer Antti Tuisku, released on 15 September 2017 through Warner Music Finland. In its first week of release, the album debuted at number one on the Finnish Albums Chart, becoming Tuisku's fifth number one album.

== Track listing ==
No.	Title	Length
1.	"Rahan takii"	3:27
2.	"Swäg" (featuring JVG)	3:19
3.	"Aamukuuteen" (featuring Erin)	2:46
4.	"Tragedia"	3:23
5.	"Mä hiihdän"	2:56
6.	"Itteni kaa kahdestaan"	3:37
7.	"Nauruterapiaa"	2:01
8.	"Hanuri" (featuring Boyat)	3:12
9.	"Jeesus-jedimestari"	4:43
10.	"Ihan tavallista mulle kuuluu"	3:38

== Charts ==
Chart (2017)	Peak position
Finnish Albums (Suomen virallinen lista)	1

== Release history ==
Region	Date	Format	Label
Finland	15 September 2017	CD, digital download	Warner Music Finland

== See also ==
- List of number-one albums of 2017 (Finland)
