= Kalamies =

Studio album by Gettomasa
- Released: September 11, 2020
- Genre: Hip hop, rap, R&B
- Length: 23:14
- Language: Finnish
- Label: PME Records
- Producer: Ruuben, MD$

Gettomasa chronology
Diplomaatti (2019)	Kalamies (2020)	Vastustamaton (2022)

Kalamies LP is Finnish rapper Gettomasa's fourth album and third studio album. It was released on September 11, 2020, by PME Records. The album features Lauri Haav on most of its tracks, as well as SHRTY and Kingfish.

The music in the album is considered "more melodic than past music" with R&B influences coming from Lauri Haav being featured. The album received criticism from Soundi magazine, who said "He's turning into a sort of Finnish Drake" in reference to Drake's music being criticized for being "sensitive". However, the album did receive some praise for being different and was able to get to number two on the Finnish album charts.

== Track listing ==
1. Houkutukset – 3:27
2. Flanellei (featuring Lauri Haav & SHRTY) – 3:24
3. Kaksovine – 2:54
4. Isi (featuring Lauri Haav) – 2:39
5. Hissukseen (featuring Lauri Haav) – 3:35
6. Älä Puhu (featuring Lauri Haav & Kingfish) – 2:46
7. Päivän Päätteeks (featuring Lauri Haav) – 3:13
8. Pehmeellä Tatsil (featuring Lauri Haav) [Bonus track] – 3:16
