= 17 (Gettomasa EP) =

EP by Gettomasa
- Released: June 23, 2017
- Genres: Hip hop, rap
- Length: 23:55
- Language: Finnish
- Labels: Warner Music Finland, PME Records
- Producers: Ruuben, Joniveli

Gettomasa chronology
Chosen One (2016)	17 (2017)	Diplomaatti (2019)

17 EP is an EP by Finnish rapper Gettomasa which was released on June 23, 2017 via Warner Music Finland and PME Records. The EP features Rekami, Kingfish, Van Hegen, Axel Kala, and Riimi.

The EP peaked at number 24 on the Finnish albums chart. It was praised for its "sharp flows and rhymes", and was nominated for the Hip Hop of the Year and Critics' Choice awards at the 2017 Emma-gaala.

== Track listing ==
1. Ykkösen bägei (featuring Kingfish) – 5:00
2. Kapteeniupponalle – 2:46
3. Kanaria – 3:18
4. Nenukki (featuring Rekami, Van Hegen, Axel Kala, Riimi) – 4:11
5. Justnii – 4:20
6. Alun loppu – 4:20
