= List of Rozen Maiden episodes =

Rozen Maiden is an anime series adapted from the manga of the same title by Peach-Pit. Produced by Nomad and directed by Kou Matsuo, the first season ran from 7 October 2004 to 23 December 2004. The second season appeared a year later; it was subtitled Träumend (トロイメント, toroimento; German for "dreaming"), and ran from 20 October 2005 to 5 January 2006. In 2006, a two-episode special titled Ouvertüre (オーベルテューレ, ōberutyūre; German for "overture") was aired on December 22 and 23, further expanding on the background of the characters.

In early 2007, Geneon USA announced it had licensed Rozen Maiden, and completely released the first season in three DVDs. Each DVD contained four episodes, and were subtitled Doll House, Maiden War, and War of the Rose, respectively. For Träumend, the first DVD, Puppet Show, was released on October 23, 2007. The other two DVDs, Revival and The Alice Game, were supposed to come out in December of that year, but were delayed because of the announcement that Geneon USA had decided to cancel its North American releases starting September 2007. On July 3, 2008, Geneon and Funimation Entertainment announced an agreement to distribute select titles in North America. While Geneon retained the license, Funimation assumed exclusive rights to the manufacturing, marketing, sales and distribution of select titles, including Rozen Maiden and Rozen Maiden: Träumend. Volume 2 of Träumend was officially released in North America on October 28, 2008, with the third volume following on December 9. The Rozen Maiden Träumend box set, containing the whole second season was released on July 21, 2009. In 2011, the North American anime licensor Sentai Filmworks re-licensed both seasons of Rozen Maiden, as well as the special Ouvertüre. A complete DVD set containing all three and a separate DVD release for the OVA were released on December 6, 2011.

Tokyopop Germany has completely released the first season on DVD, and the first Träumend DVD has originally been announced for March 2008, however the company, citing an increase in illegal downloads and a decrease in DVD sales, has announced that it will "pause" DVD sales. Kazé, an anime publisher in France, has licensed the anime and has completely released the two TV seasons and the special.

A third season titled Rozen Maiden Zurückspulen was produced by Studio Deen and directed by Mamoru Hatakeyama. It aired from July 4 to September 26, 2013, in Japan. The series was streamed on Crunchyroll. Sentai Filmworks has acquired Zurückspulen for streaming and home video release in 2014.

== Episodes ==
=== Rozen Maiden ===
No.	Title	Original release date
1	"Rozen Maiden"; Transliteration: "Bara Otome" (Japanese: 薔薇乙女 Fräulein Rose)	October 7, 2004
Jun Sakurada is a hikikomori, or a boy who has decided to isolate himself from the outside world, and legally does not go to school. In his time, Jun orders unorthodox items online, only to return them for a refund. One day, he receives a paper, asking whether or not to wind. After Jun carelessly accepts, a mysterious box appears with a doll inside. This doll, being able to move and talk, introduces herself as Shinku, the fifth doll of the Rozen Maiden. Jun enters a contract with Shinku, becoming her medium.
2	"Hinaichigo"; Transliteration: "Hinaichigo" (Japanese: 雛苺 Kleine Beere)	October 14, 2004
Hinaichigo, the sixth doll of the Rozen Maiden, and her medium, Tomoe, are introduced. Hinaichigo is always sad that Tomoe never has time to play with her. However, Hinaichigo does not realize that Tomoe has been gradually becoming weak due to their contract with each other. Shinku goes through a portal to the world of Hinaichigo, where the dolls must fight each other in the Alice Game.
3	"Suigintou"; Transliteration: "Suigintō" (Japanese: 水銀燈 Mercury Lampe)	October 21, 2004
Hinaichigo now lives with Jun and Nori, becoming Shinku's servant due to her loss in the Alice Game. Jun and Nori try to figure out what "unyuu" is, which is what Hinaichigo calls her favorite food. Meanwhile, Suigintou, the first doll of the Rozen Maidens, appears, encountering Shinku and Hinaichigo.
4	"Suiseiseki"; Transliteration: "Suiseiseki" (Japanese: 翠星石 Jade Stern)	October 28, 2004
Suiseiseki, the third doll of the Rozen Maidens, is introduced from a flying box that crashes through a window into Jun's room. She takes everyone to Jun's dream world, which is actually a lifeless domain filled with memories of Jun's past. The doll also shows them how everyone has a soul tree that grows inside them.
5	"The Stairway"; Transliteration: "Kaidan" (Japanese: 階段 Die Treppe)	November 4, 2004
Hinaichigo and Jun must battle Suiseiseki and Shinku to get to the truth of who took Hinaichigo's strawberry from her strawberry cake.
6	"Tears"; Transliteration: "Namida" (Japanese: 涙 Tränen)	November 11, 2004
Suigintou takes Hinaichigo hostage. Jun, Shinku, and Suiseiseki enter the world of Suigintou and save Hinaichigo from the clutches of Suigintou. It is also shown that Jun is capable of bringing a clown doll back to life by sewing its broken pieces. Shinku suddenly collapses at the end of the episode due to exhaustion.
7	"Dreams"; Transliteration: "Yume" (Japanese: 夢 Träume)	November 18, 2004
In order to save Shinku, and later Hinaichigo, from exhaustion, Jun must confront his fears of his middle school and retrieve a book containing information on the Rozen Maiden dolls that he discovers to be there.
8	"Souseiseki"; Transliteration: "Sōseiseki" (Japanese: 蒼星石 Lapislazuli Stern)	November 25, 2004
Souseiseki, the fourth doll of the Rozen Maiden, is introduced. She lives with an old man, named Motoharu, who believes her to be his late son, Kazuki, which forces her to stay with him. Suiseiseki is traumatized by her twin sister's resolve to choose the Motoharu over her. Moreover, Suigintou soon intervenes.
9	"The Prison"; Transliteration: "Ori" (Japanese: 檻 Das Gefängnis)	December 2, 2004
Motoharu's past is revealed. Long ago, when Kazuki died in a car crash, Motoharu's wife, Matsu, fell into a deep sleep. Now Motoharu calls out for Kazuki, because he is in shock at the loss of his family. Suigintou takes control of Motoharu's dream world and entraps Jun and the dolls inside it. Suigintou also takes Souseiseki's artificial spirit, Lempika. She then pressures Suiseiseki to hand over her artificial spirit, Sui Dream, lest Jun's life be endangered.
10	"Parting"; Transliteration: "Betsuri" (Japanese: 別離 Abschied)	December 9, 2004
Suigintou wagers a battle with Shinku for the victor's Rosa Mystica at midnight. Throughout the day, Shinku is acting awfully quiet, and no one knows of her bet. Jun tells Shinku he thinks the life of a Rozen Maiden is sad, because they are given life only to fight one another, but Shinku does not agree with him, stating that "to live means to fight". The episode ends with Shinku bidding farewell to Jun at midnight, for the following battle could cost Shinku her life.
11	"Destiny"; Transliteration: "Unmei" (Japanese: 運命 Schicksal)	December 16, 2004
The battle begins between Suigintou and Shinku. Suigintou seals Jun into his dream world where he begins to have a breakdown due to his past memories. Jun suffers emotionally and begins to think that he is good for nothing. Hinaichigo, Suiseiseki, and Souseiseki intervene in the battle between Suigintou and Shinku, while Nori comforts Jun. Suigintou manages to tear off one of Shinku's arms, but Jun steps in to protect her.
12	"Shinku"; Transliteration: "Shinku" (Japanese: 真紅 Reiner Rubin)	December 23, 2004
Jun recovers Shinku's arm and fixes it, something only Rozen was thought to be able to do. A final attack by Suigintou gets reflected by Jun, burning Suigintou in the process. Having used too much power, Shinku temporarily disappears. Jun's experiences in the dream world are shown to have changed him. He is no longer afraid of the outside world and becomes a stronger person, being able to return to school. Jun becoming stronger as a human also allows Shinku to return to the human world.

=== Rozen Maiden Träumend ===
No.	Title	Original release date
13	"Barasuishou"; Transliteration: "Bara Suishō" (Japanese: 薔薇水晶 Rozenkristall)	October 20, 2005
Jun has overcome his past and must now make up all his schoolwork before he can actually return to school. Suiseiseki and Souseiseki barge into the Sakurada residence as usual, the dolls play with each other, and everything is back to normal. However, Shinku starts to have deep nightmares about Suigintou. Barasuishou, the supposed seventh doll of the Rozen Maiden, is introduced.
14	"Enju"; Transliteration: "Enju" (Japanese: 槐 Enju)	October 27, 2005
Shinku claims that none of the other dolls have met Barasuishou before. Since Barasuishou is supposedly the seventh doll, this seems to be a sign that the Alice Game would be coming to a conclusion soon. Shinku's strange behavior continues, and Jun continues to worry about her. Jun also goes with Tomoe to visit the doll shop of a doll maker named Enju.
15	"Kanaria"; Transliteration: "Kanariya" (Japanese: 金糸雀 Kanarienvogel)	November 3, 2005
Kanaria, the second doll of the Rozen Maiden, is introduced. Her initial plan is to sneak into the Sakurada residence and take the Rosa Mysticae from Shinku, Hinaichigo, Suiseiseki, and Souseiseki. However, chaos erupts as the dolls think that a burglar broke in.
16	"Contract"; Transliteration: "Keiyaku" (Japanese: 契約 Vereinbarung)	November 10, 2005
Suiseiseki decides to find a medium, and Jun is the only one eligible, though she is skeptical about him. Ultimately, Jun and the five dolls are taken to the world of Barasuishou, where the Alice Game is foreshadowed. Jun enters into a contract with Suiseiseki.
17	"The Letter"; Transliteration: "Tegami" (Japanese: 手紙 Der Brief)	November 17, 2005
Hinaichigo tries to venture outdoors to a mailbox on her own in order to send a letter to Jun. Suiseiseki tries to earn Jun's respect. Souseiseki tries to keep order in the house. Kanaria tries to break into the Sakurada residence yet again. Jun and Shinku are in the background during these events.
18	"Angel"; Transliteration: "Tenshi" (Japanese: 天使 Engel)	November 24, 2005
Megu, a girl hospitalized with an incurable disease, enters into a contract with Suigintou, who has been revived after being burned to death at the end of the first season. However, Megu wishes only for death and insists that she is incomplete and broken. Suigintou initially has amensia and cannot remember dying, but eventually regains her memories. Suigintou encounters Barasuishou, and later Shinku. She comes to the realization that she was revived in order to participate in the Alice Game.
19	"Tea Party"; Transliteration: "Chakai" (Japanese: 茶会 Teegesellschaft)	December 1, 2005
Kanaria makes her resolve to fight, in order to both remain alive. and to make her medium, Micchan, happy. However, Shinku stops Kanaria's attack on the other dolls, and the dolls all end up helping Kanaria fulfill Micchan's wish a different way. Meanwhile, Souseiseki starts to reflect deeper on the Alice Game and begins to believe that she and her sisters should fight.
20	"Doll Maker"; Transliteration: "Ningyōshi" (Japanese: 人形師 Puppenmacher)	December 8, 2005
After having seen an apparition of Rozen, the creator of the Rozen Maiden dolls, Souseiseki sees the deep meaning behind the Alice Game. After having seen Enju and his feelings about dolls, Jun starts to wonder more about Rozen and his love for his dolls. Souseiseki resolves to fight her sisters, take their Rosa Mysticae, and become Alice.
21	"The Reproach"; Transliteration: "Kai / Imashime" (Japanese: 戒 Der Tadel)	December 15, 2005
Suiseiseki becomes worried about Souseiseki. Souseiseki battles against Suigintou, who has teamed up with Barasuishou, only to be defeated. Souseiseki comforts Suiseiseki as her Rosa Mystica leaves her body.
22	"Tomoe"; Transliteration: "Tomoe" (Japanese: 巴 Tomoe)	January 12, 2006
Suiseiseki tries to get Souseiseki's Rosa Mystica but Suigintou gets it first. Hinaichigo begins to wind down and fall into a deep slumber, and shares her last moments with Tomoe. Afterward, her Rosa Mystica is recovered by Shinku. There is no time to mourn, however, since Barasuishou, Laplace, and Enju have apparently laid a trap for Jun and the remaining dolls of the Rozen Maiden.
23	"Rose Garden"; Transliteration: "Baraen" (Japanese: 薔薇園 Rosengarten)	January 19, 2006
In order to fulfill Rozen's wish, Shinku, Suiseiseki, and Kanaria fight Barasuishou and Suigintou in the Alice game. As the fight rages on, eventually Shinku is the only doll left to fight them.
24	"Alice"; Transliteration: "Shōjo" (Japanese: 少女 Alice)	January 26, 2006
Suigintou is killed by Barasuishou after being worn out by Shinku. She dies protecting Shinku, stating that the one to defeat Shinku can only be her. Shinku is saddened and enraged by Suigintou and the other dolls' deaths. Shinku defeats Barasuishou, but Jun convinces her to spare Barasuishou's life. While Shinku is distracted, Barasuishou fatally wounds her, and takes all of the Rosa Mysticae for herself. Enju reveals that he was Rozen's disciple, but aspired to create an even better doll than Rozen's. However, Barasuishou breaks after ingesting all of the Rosa Mysticae, due to not being a doll made by Rozen, and thus being unable to become Alice. With all the Rozen Maidens motionless and devoid of their Rosa Mysticas Jun calls to Rozen, who appears and resurrects Kanaria, Suiseiseki, Suigintou and Shinku. Rozen reveals to Shinku and Jun that there's another way to end the Alice Game, and asks them to seek a way to bring back Souseiseki and Hinaichigo.

=== Rozen Maiden Ouvertüre ===
No.	Title	Original release date
1	"Eternity"; Transliteration: "Yūkyū" (Japanese: 悠久 Ewigkeit)	December 22, 2006
Set in the middle of Träumend, Souseiseki tells Jun the story of the Rozen Maidens' past, when they lived in 19th century, London, and when Shinku first met Suigintou.
2	"Vanity"; Transliteration: "Kyoshoku" (Japanese: 虚飾 Eitelkeit)	December 23, 2006
Suigintou and Shinku become close friends until misunderstandings led to their longtime rivalry.

=== Rozen Maiden Zurückspulen ===
No.	Title	Original release date
1	"Tale 1"	July 4, 2013
The story follows the beginning of the manga from the moment when Jun answers the invitation from Laplace and Shinku is delivered to him. Soon after, Suigintou appears to attack Shinku and after Jun accepts to become Shinku's servant, she decides to flee. After learning the rules of the Alice Game from Shinku, Jun researches about the Rozen Maiden on the internet while Kanaria tries to sneak into his house with no success. However, Suiseiseki appears asking for Shinku's help, claiming that she does not want to make a contract with the man who became the master of her sister Souseiseki. However, they are drawn to Souseiseki's N-Field and after a brief confrontation, Souseiseki decides to surrender her Rosa Mystica to her sister, but Suigintou appears, only to steal it for herself. Some time later, the seventh doll, Kirakishou, draws Hinaichigo to her N-Field and takes possession of her body, as she do not have a proper one, and Hinaichigo's Rosa Mystica is delivered to Shinku. Meanwhile, Jun is at home and realises that Shinku and Suiseiseki have gone missing and decides to search for them. At that moment, Laplace appears and shows him a mysterious door inside the N-Field and asks him if he would open it or not. Jun agrees and passes through it.
2	"Tale 2"	July 11, 2013
The story shifts to alternate universe where Jun, who unlike the first one, refused Laplace's invitation and did not meet the Rozen Maidens. Years later, this Jun started living by himself and now divides his time between working in a bookstore and going to college. One day, he finds an unclaimed box containing the first of a series of books with instructions and materials to create a Rozen Maiden. After taking the book home, Jun finds the second volume already delivered there including a storage case and some parts for the doll in question, which is revealed to be Shinku. Since then, Jun spends his free time working on Shinku's creation as he receive more volumes until they stop coming without any warning. Soon after, the adult Jun is contacted on his phone by the original Jun explaining that in his reality, several Rozen Maidens were already defeated by Kirakishou and he asks for his help to revive Shinku. However, he later receives a letter with a cancellation notice for the book series and he finds himself with no parts left to complete her.
3	"Tale 3"	July 18, 2013
According to the cancellation notice, Jun must search the N-Field for the remaining parts to complete Shinku and he is later instructed by his other self to also design some clothes for her. As he works on Shinku's clothes, Jun remembers his childhood and the events that led him to his seclusion at home. Once Shinku's clothes are completed, Jun falls asleep and finds himself inside the N-Field covered with doll parts, and is informed by the young Jun that Shinku's real parts are hidden among them by Kirakishou who had learned about their plans and is trying to stop them. After Jun retrieves the right parts and assembles Shinku's body, he manages to awaken her.
4	"Tale 4"	July 25, 2013
Back from the N-Field Jun finds the completed Shinku inside her case and uses her key to wind her and fully awaken her in the real world. Shinku then explains to him that Kirakishou had captured her and almost all her sisters and with her body trapped inside the N-Field she needed his help to transfer her Rosa Mystica into a temporary body and escape. She also reveals that by choosing to "not wind" upon receiving Laplace's invitation, Jun had erased the existence of all Rozen Maidens in his world. The next morning Jun leaves for work while leaving Shinku at home. The day after that, Jun takes Shinku shopping for a new teapot with Shinku hidden inside his backpack and runs into his co-worker Saito at the shops, who is looking for some fabric to create a costume for herself to wear at a play and Jun provides her with some advice. After they return home, Shinku wonders about what she must do to stop Kirakishou as her temporary body can only last for seven more days.
5	"Tale 5"	August 1, 2013
Jun receives the first volume of a second "How to Make a Doll" series but Shinku instructs him to not open it, as it may be a trap by Kirakishou. As Jun leaves for work, Suigintou appears before Shinku and it does not take long for them to start fighting again. When Jun returns home and finds the place thrashed, he orders Shinku to clean up the whole mess while Suigintou reminisces about how she met her medium, Megu, and it is revealed that when she and Megu finally formed a contract, Kirakishou appeared to steal Megu's soul, much to her despair. After the apartment is cleaned, Suigintou declares a truce and claims that she will return to the n-field once a chance appears, while Shinku ponders that eventually she will have to do the same as well, as her temporary body can last for only six days at most.
6	"Tale 6"	August 8, 2013
Jun is invited by Saito to help with her play and after returning home, he finds that another volume from the second series has arrived but decides to not tell Shinku about it. In the next day, as Jun leaves for work, Shinku and Suigintou fight each other again until they decide to keep holding their truce until they return to their original world and rescue their masters. Meanwhile at job, Jun is harassed by his supervisor and fed up with his current situation, he returns home and asks Shinku if there is a possibility for him to change his past, but she claims that it is not possible. Distraught upon the fact that Shinku will eventually return to her own world and leave him alone, Jun receives an email on his mobile phone instructing him to start working on the second doll, and he decides to do so only while she sleeps, keeping it a secret from her.
7	"Tale 7"	August 15, 2013
Having slept on the roof of Jun's apartment complex rather than inside her case, Suigintou's energy has been severely drained, and Shinku allows Suigintou to sleep inside her case during the day. At work, Jun buys a book titled A Doll in the Palm of my Hand for Shinku and finds another volume of the second doll making series. Upon returning home, Jun receives another volume and hides them from Shinku. Jun and Shinku read the book he bought together. At night with Shinku asleep, Suigintou sees Jun assembling the doll, and agrees to keep it a secret from Shinku. In exchange, Jun is to offer himself as a medium for Suigintou. Meanwhile inside the N-Field young Jun, knowing nothing about the second series, deduces that someone posing as him had been sending the adult Jun the messages to construct a second doll. Young Jun tries to send a message to warn adult Jun not to assemble the doll, but the message is blocked by Kirakishou.
8	"Tale 8"	August 22, 2013
Jun spends the next days busy as he works on the bookstore, helps with Saitou's play and assembles the doll as more parts are delivered to him. After Jun completes the doll's body, Suigintou inspects it and realizes to whom it belongs. The next day, after Suigintou reminds her that the time limit for her to survive in her temporary body is about to run out, Shinku demands Jun to take her to the play's opening, and he agrees to do so as long as she keeps herself hidden inside his backpack. However, just before the play starts, it is revealed that the doll to be used as a prop is missing and Shinku purposely lets herself be found by members of the play. The cast members then decide to use Shinku, who pretends to be an ordinary doll, as a replacement in the play. Suigintou then turns up to watch the play while hiding in the ceiling, knowing that Kirakishou will soon make a move.
9	"Tale 9"	August 29, 2013
The young Jun and Kanaria are still trapped in the N-field, until it starts distorting itself as a sign of Kirakishou's advent. The play begins, but time stops midway and Kirakishou appears before Shinku, Shigintou and the adult Jun. Surprised that Kirakishou managed to materialize herself in the alternate world, Shinku learns from Suigintou that it was possible because one of their sisters' body was disassembled and sent there to act as a second body for her. Realizing that they have no option but to fight, Shinku and Suigintou join forces against their younger sister, until Suiseiseki arrives and much to their surprise, stands in their way, protecting Kirakishou's body. That is when Shinku realizes that Kirakishou is manifesting herself using Souseiseki's body.
10	"Tale 10"	September 5, 2013
Determined to make amends for being deceived by Kirakishou, Jun asks Shinku to make a contract with him. However, the other three dolls intervene and they start fighting among themselves until Jun accidentally kisses the ring Suiseiseki was carrying, and she reveals that said ring does not belong to her, but to her twin sister instead, and Kirakishou's spirit is expelled from Souseiseki's body. Suiseiseki then demands Suigintou to return the Rosa Mystica she stole from Souseiseki to its original owner but she refuses, and Suiseiseki decides to revive her sister using her own instead. Jun awakens beside Kanaria and the young Jun in the N-Field and after having a brief conversation they manage to break free. The adult Jun bids farewell to his child self and departs with Kanaria to return to his own world but decides to turn back and help the others when Kanaria informs him that if he leaves at the current state of matters, time will rewind in his world and all the time he spent with Shinku and the others will be erased. Jun and Kanaria reunite Shinku and Suigintou and much to their surprise, they also find Souseiseki carrying Suiseiseki's lifeless body, revealing that as both twins have their Rosa Mystica intertwined, they can be used to give life to either of them. Recognizing Jun as the one who assembled her, Souseiseki acknowledges him as her master.
11	"Tale 11"	September 12, 2013
Kanaria departs to look for the young Jun who discovers the location of Shinku's real body. Upon learning that the only way for everybody to return to their original worlds is by having the large clock before them start moving again, Souseiseki reveals that she can do so, but needs her twin sister's help for it. Suigintou refuses to return the Rosa Mystica she stole from Souseiseki until she points out that the restlesness in her heart is due to the fact that Suigintou did not win it in a fair fight, agreeing to give it back and recognizing her as the true victor once their task is finished. After regaining her own Rosa Mystica, Souseiseki returns the one she received from Suiseiseki and the twins are finally reunited. By Jun's command, the sisters manage to make time move again, but Kirakishou appears to interfere, until Jun rejects her pleas to become her master and she disappears. With their task done, Souseiseki is about to keep her end of the deal by surrendering her Rosa Mystica to Suigintou when Shinku's temporary body reaches its limit and suddenly breaks apart. Meanwhile, Kanaria reunites with the other Jun and they discover that Hinaichigo's artificial spirit and Rosa Mystica were protecting Shinku's body during the entire series of events.
12	"Tale 12"	September 19, 2013
Jun watches in grief as Shinku's body crumbles before him except for the head until his young self arrives with Kanaria, bringing Shinku's true body with them. As the two Juns revive Shinku, Suigintou learns that Hinaichigo had surrendered her Rosa Mystica to Shinku out of her own volition and was protecting her body all this time, wondering if gathering all Rosa Mysticas by force is the real method to win the Alice game after all. Souseiseki is ready to return her Rosa Mystica to Suigintou as she promised but her older sister leaves without reclaiming it, affirming that she will do so in a later occasion. The adult Jun then entrusts Souseiseki's ring to his middle school counterpart, bidding farewell to Shinku and the others before they part ways, returning to their own respective worlds.
13	"Tale 13"	September 26, 2013
Back to his reality, the older Jun returns to attend classes at college and is approached by one of his superiors at the bookstore who recognizes his hard work and offers him a higher position, but he claims that he needs to think about it. Saito and her crew also are impressed with Jun's help and ask him to keep working with them. As he wonders about the possibilities that recently opened up to him, Jun contemplates Shinku's wound key, which is still at his possession, as a sign that his adventures with her and the others were not an illusion at all. Back at the original reality, Jun finally manages to return to school as well, but some time later, he gets into a coma after falling from some stairs, while Mitsu disappears without a trace. Certain that Kirakishou is behind both incidents, Shinku, Tomoe, Souseiseki, Suiseiseki and Kanaria make contact with the alternate Jun and ask for his help once more.
