= Gettomasa =

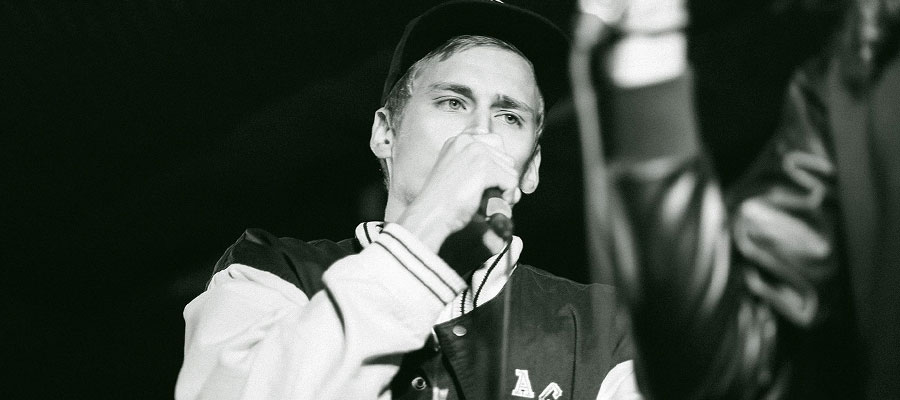
- Gettomasa in 2015.

Background information
- Born: Aleksi Lehikoinen; 22 November 1993 (age 32); Montreal, Canada
- Origin: Jyväskylä, Finland
- Genre: Hip-hop
- Years active: 2012–present

Aleksi Lehikoinen (born November 22, 1993), better known by his stage name Gettomasa, is a Canadian-born Finnish rapper. He won the Finnish battle rap championship Rap SM in 2012. He released his debut album Vellamo LP in 2014 with Finnish music producer Ruuben. His first solo project Chosen One was released in 2016.

== Life and career ==
Lehikoinen was born in Montreal, Canada in 1993 to Finnish parents. He moved to Finland as a child, and spent most of his childhood in the Kortepohja district of Jyväskylä. He has been very open about his troubled childhood and growing up with his abusive alcoholic father. He discussed their problematic father-son relationship on the track "Pelkuri" (The Coward) of Chosen One.

Lehikoinen is a high school dropout but graduated from a vocational school in 2015.

=== Early life ===
Lehikoinen was six years old when he was introduced to rap music by his cousin. He started creating music at the age of 17, and in 2012, he won the Finnish battle rap championship Rap SM.

=== Beginning of career (2014–2017) ===
In 2014 he released his debut album Vellamo LP with Finnish music producer Ruuben via Finnish label KPC Records.

In 2014, Lehikoinen made a record deal with the Finnish label PME Records, through which he released his first solo album Chosen One in 2016, in which most of the songs were produced by Ruuben. In 2017 Lehikoinen released 17 EP.

=== Diplomaatti and breakthrough (2017–2020) ===
In 2019, Lehikoinen released his second solo album Diplomaatti, widely considered his breakthrough album. With the single "Silmät" he was able to reach number one on the Finnish Spotify list, and was eventually awarded the Finnish Emma award for Rap/R&B Album of the Year. In September 2020, Lehikoinen released a surprise album, Kalamies LP.

=== Feud with Lukas Leon ===
In November 2020, Lehikoinen released the single "Veli mä vannon", in which he mocked rapper Lukas Leon, rapping "When I saw you and wanted to battle, good that you didn't sh*t your pants" in response to when Lukas Leon named Lehikoinen in a rap battle YouTube video and challenged him to be on his Lukas Leon Vs. series. In response to "Veli mä vannon", Lukas Leon released a diss track on YouTube in December 2020 named "Gekkomasa". A day after the release of "Gekkomasa", Lehikoinen released his own diss track "Istu" ("Sit") of Lukas Leon. The next day Lehikoinen said the feud was over on his part. A day later Lukas Leon confirmed the end of the feud.

=== KPC Tour and Vastustamaton (2022–present) ===
Lehikoinen released his fifth album Vastustamaton on November 4, 2022. This album was able to reach number 1 on the Finnish charts, and it was awarded the Album of the Year for Rap/R&B in the Emma-awards. In November and December 2022, Lehikoinen went on the KPC Tour, which included artists from his rap collective KPC. In early 2023 he released the singles "Meit ei oo" and "Jälkeekään" which both got to #1 on the Finnish charts. In March 2024, he released an EP with Kube titled EP with the track "Kauas Pois" reaching #7 on the Finnish charts.

== Discography ==
=== Albums ===
- Vellamo LP (2014) with Ruuben
- Chosen One (2016)
- Diplomaatti (2019)
- Kalamies (2020)
- Vastustamaton (2022)

=== EPs ===
- Vaatekaappi EP (2012) with Ruuben
- Sessari EP (2012) with Rekami
- 17 (2017)
- EP (2024) with Kube
