= Antti Tuisku =

Finnish singer (born 1984)

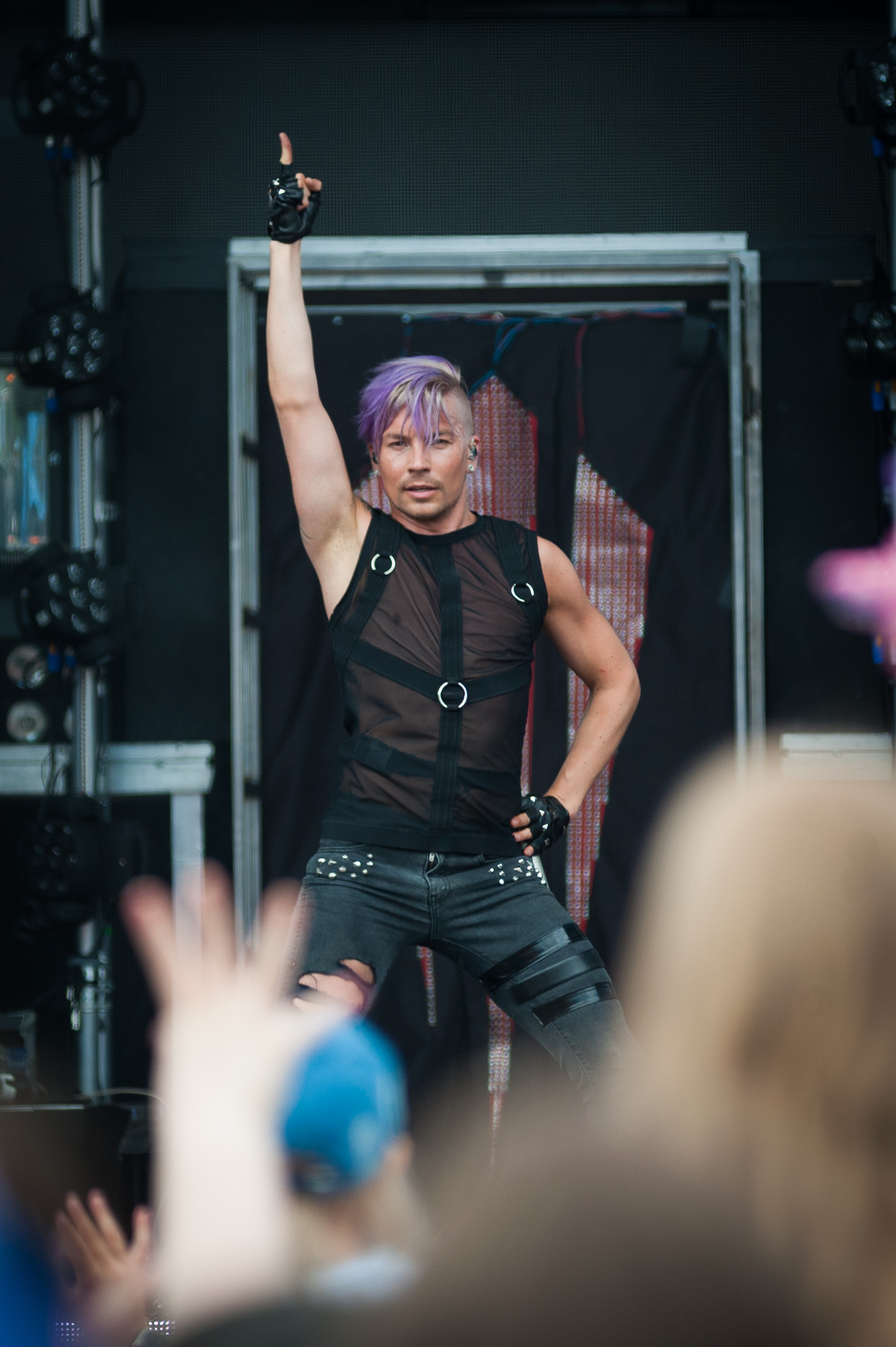
- Tuisku performing in June 2016

Background information
- Born: Antti Tapani Tuisku; 27 February 1984 (age 41)
- Origin: Rovaniemi, Finland
- Genres: Pop music
- Occupations: Singer, musician
- Instrument: Vocals
- Years active: 2004–2023

Antti Tuisku (born 27 February 1984) is a retired Finnish pop singer. He finished third in the 2003 Idols talent show, the Finnish version of Pop Idol. Tuisku has sold over 300,000 records during his career in Finland.

In 2016, Tuisku won the Best Male Artist 2015 award at Emma-gaala. His 2016 album En kommentoi received the Record of the Year and Best Pop Album of the Year awards.

== Career ==
=== En kommentoi ===
Tuisku's 10th album En kommentoi was released in May 2015. The album spent nine weeks at number one on the Official Finnish Album Chart.

After the success of the album he embarked on the Peto on irti tour. In April 2016 he sold out two concerts at Hartwall Arena in Helsinki. The two concerts gathered together over 22 000 fans.

=== Other ventures ===
Tuisku appeared in the film Joulutarina in 2007. He has also voiced Arthur in the movie Shrek the Third. In 2010 Tuisku won the Finnish version of Dancing with the Stars. He participated in the Vain elämää television show's fourth season in 2015.

Tuisku is well-known for his flamboyant and extravagant style. He is also active as a fashion designer. In April 2016 Antti Tuisku released his first clothing line Antti Tuisku by Seppälä in collaboration with the Finnish clothing chain Seppälä. He was the host of Uuden musiikin kilpailu 2021.

Tuisku ended his career in 2023.

== Discography ==
=== Studio albums ===
Year	Title	Peak position	Certification
Year	Title	FIN	Certification
2004	Ensimmäinen	1	Double platinum
2005	Antti Tuisku	1	Platinum
2005	Minun jouluni	3	Gold
2006	New York	1	Gold
2006	Rovaniemi	2	–
2009	Hengitän	3	Gold
2010	Kaunis kaaos	2	Platinum
2011	Minun jouluni 2	5	Gold
2011	Toisenlainen tie	2	Gold
2015	En kommentoi	1	Double platinum
2017	Anatude	1	–
2020	Valittu kansa	1	–
2023	Sisään ja ulos	1	–

=== Compilation albums ===
Year	Title	Peak position
Year	Title	FIN
2007	Aikaa – Greatest Hits Vol. 1	10

=== Others ===
Year	Title	Peak position
Year	Title	FIN
2004	Ensimmäinen Deluxe	3
2007	Hengitän [Special Edition]	28

=== EPs ===
Year	Title	Peak position
Year	Title	FIN
2021	Master Workout	1

=== Singles ===
Year	Title	Peak position	Album
Year	Title	FIN	Album
2004	"En halua tietää"	1	Ensimmäinen
2004	"Yritä ymmärtää / Boom Boom"	3	Ensimmäinen
2005	"Tyhjä huone"	1	Antti Tuisku
2006	"Sekaisin"	2	New York
2009	"Juuret"	1	Hengitän
2009	"Viilto"	12	Hengitän
2010	"Hyökyaalto"	13	Kaunis kaaos
2015	"Peto on irti"	5	En kommentoi
2015	"Blaablaa (En kuule sanaakaan)"	–	En kommentoi
2015	"Keinutaan" (featuring VilleGalle)	3	En kommentoi
2015	"Sata salamaa"	1	Vain elämää kausi 4 – päivä
2015	"Party (Papiidipaadi)" (featuring Nikke Ankara)	1	En kommentoi – Deluxe version
2016	"Pyydä multa anteeks kunnolla"	2	En kommentoi – Deluxe version
2016	"Suurin fani"	12	En kommentoi – Deluxe version
2017	"Mä hiihdän"	2	Anatude
2017	"Rahan takii"	1	Anatude
2017	"Hanuri" (featuring Boyat)	1	Anatude
2017	"Aamukuuteen" (featuring Erin)	1	Anatude
2017	"Tragedia"	3	Anatude
2017	"Swag" (featuring JVG)	5	Anatude
2018	"Vedän sut henkeen"	1	–
2018	"Kumipuku"	5	–
2018	"Lämmin lumi peittää maan"	15	–
2019	"Joku raja"	4	Vain elämää kausi 10
2019	"Minun Suomeni"	6	Vain elämää kausi 10
2021	"Treenaa"	1	Master Workout
2021	"Kipee"	4	Master Workout
2021	"Huonoja ideoita" (featuring Erika Vikman)	12	Non-album single
2022	"Koti"	4	Sisään ja ulos
2022	"Grindr Mayhem" (featuring Bess)	7	Sisään ja ulos
2023	"Baila por mi"	11	Sisään ja ulos
2023	"Auto jää" (featuring Käärijä)	6	Sisään ja ulos
2023	"Tähdet"	34	Sisään ja ulos

=== Other charted songs ===
Year	Title	Peak position	Album
Year	Title	FIN	Album
2015	"Pojat"	8	Vain elämää kausi 4 – päivä
2020	"Valittu kansa"	1	Valittu kansa
2020	"Häitä ja hautajaisii"	5	Valittu kansa
2020	"Jesse on mun frendi"	8	Valittu kansa
2020	"Kerran vuodes kirkkoon"	9	Valittu kansa
2020	"Bailantai"	11	Valittu kansa
2020	"Jumalan kämmenellä"	13	Valittu kansa
2020	"Pyhä kosketus"	14	Valittu kansa
2020	"Mistä minä tiedän"	16	Valittu kansa
2020	"Pidä tunkkis"	19	Valittu kansa

== See also ==
- List of best-selling music artists in Finland
