= JVG (band) =

Finnish rap duo

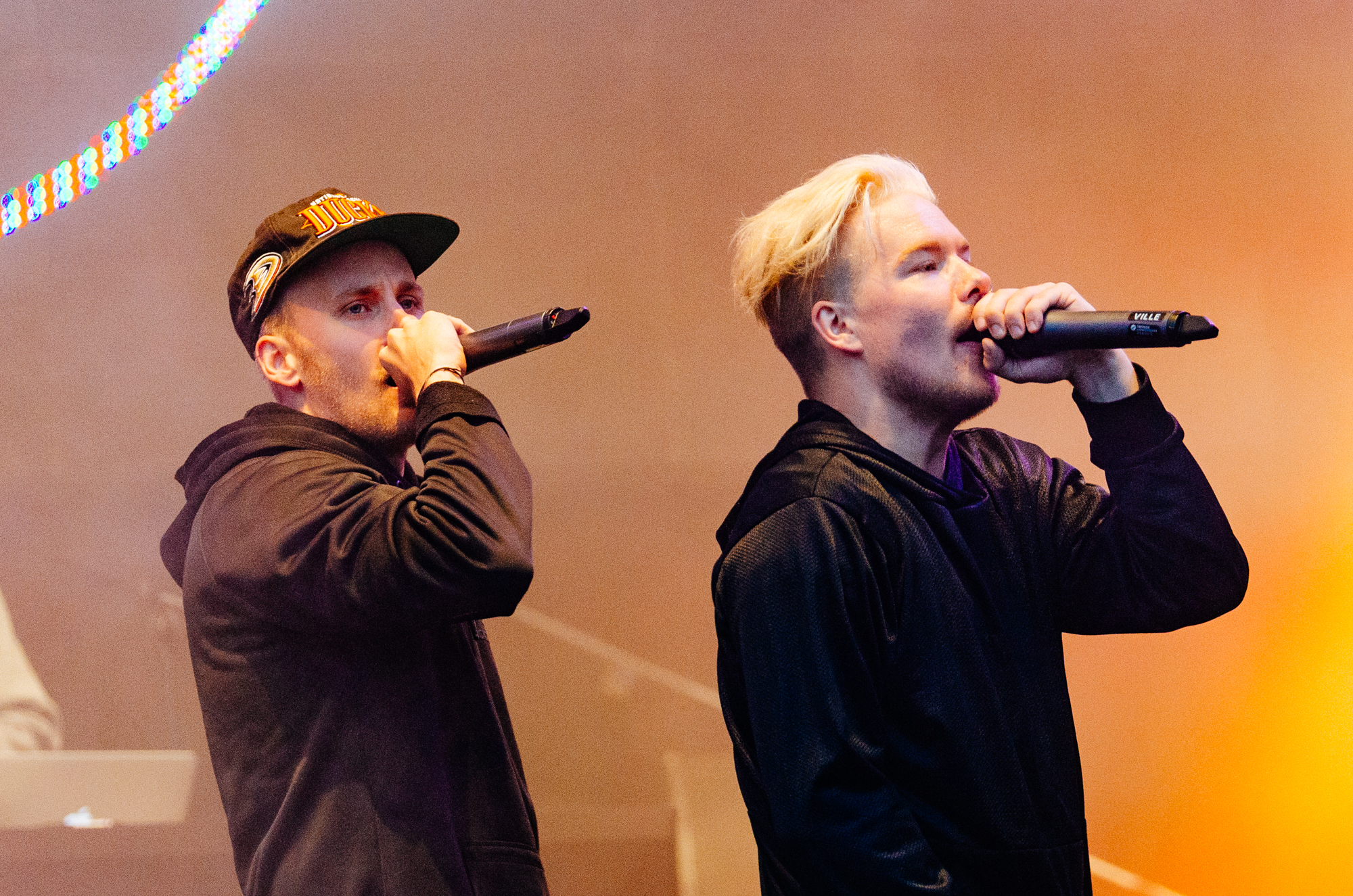
- Jare & VilleGalle performing in 2014

Background information
- Also known as: Jare & VilleGalle
- Origin: Helsinki, Finland
- Genres: Pop-rap, comedy hip hop, trap, EDM
- Years active: 2009–present
- Members: Jare Joakim Brand; VilleGalle
- Website: jvg.fi

JVG (Finnish pronunciation: [ˈjiːˌʋeːˌɡeː]; formerly known as Jare & VilleGalle) is a Finnish rap duo made up of Jare Joakim Brand (born 8 October 1987) and Ville-Petteri Galle (born 4 October 1987).

Their style is often referred to as sport rap. Both Jare and Ville are passionate athletes and originally became famous for their unique and comical sports-themed songs, where they rapped about ice hockey, soccer, doping, Finnish sportspeople (such as Jari Litmanen and Teemu Selänne), snus and playing NHL video games. Some of their comedic lyrics are thought to be incomprehensible to those not from East Helsinki as much of their music adopts slang from the Eastern part of the Finnish capital.

In 2020, during the COVID-19 pandemic, JVG held a virtual reality concert on the first of May in a simulated version of Helsinki, with estimated attendance somewhere from 700,000 to over 1,000,000.

== Discography ==
=== Albums ===
Year	Album	Charts	Certification	Notes
Year	Album	FIN	Certification	Notes
2011	Mustaa kultaa (credited as Jare & VilleGalle)	1	Gold	In CD and LP versions
2012	jvg.fi	1		
2014	Voitolla yöhön	1		
2015	247365	2		
2017	Popkorni	1		
2019	Rata/raitti	1		
2022	Mun tapa pelata	1		
2025	Rallikansa	2		

=== Singles ===
Year	Single	Charts	Album
Year	Single	FIN	Album
Credited as Jare & VilleGalle
2010	"Epoo" (featuring Heikki Kuula)	–	Mustaa kultaa
2011	"Nelisilmä" (featuring Heikki Kuula)	17	Mustaa kultaa
2011	"Häissä"	1	Mustaa kultaa
Credited as JVG
2011	"Mitä sä siit tiiät (Heeeyyy)" (featuring Ruudolf & Karri Koira)	18	Mustaa kultaa (LP version)
2012	"Karjala Takaisin" (featuring Freeman)	5	jvg.fi
2012	"Kran Turismo" (featuring Raappana)	1	jvg.fi
2013	"Voitolla yöhön"	3	Voitolla yöhön
2014	"Huominen on huomenna" (featuring Anna Abreu)	1	Voitolla yöhön
2014	"Etenee" (featuring Pete Parkkonen)	11	Voitolla yöhön
2015	"Mauton jasso"	3	247365
2015	"Tuulisii" (featuring Pete Parkkonen)	3	247365
2015	"Tarkenee"	1	247365
2015	"Takajeejee" (featuring Evelina)	2	247365
2016	"Paluu tulevaisuuteen"	1	
2016	"Hehkuu"	1	
2016	"Mist sä tuut, Part. 2"	4	
2017	"Sitä säät mitä tilaat" (featuring Elli-Noora)	1	
2017	"Urheiluhullu"	3	
2017	"Älä jätä roikkuu"	1	Popkorni
2017	"Hombre" (featuring Vesala)	3	Popkorni
2017	"Matti & Teppo"	4	Popkorni
2017	"Lähen menee" (featuring Reino Nordin)	6	Popkorni
2017	"Kruunu tikittää" (featuring Tippa-T)	11	Popkorni
2017	"Tappiolla tappiin" (featuring Märkä-Simo)	12	Popkorni
2017	"En sun kaa" (featuring Bizi)	15	Popkorni
2017	"Pitkät päällä"	17	Popkorni
2018	"Popkorni"	1	Popkorni
2018	"Roska silmäs" (with Tippa)	2	Non-album singles
2018	"Mitä mä Malagas?" (with Gasellit)	2	Non-album singles
2019	"Ikuinen vappu"	1	Rata/raitti
2019	"Frisbee"	1	Rata/raitti
2019	"Rahan takii"	8	Vain elämää kausi 10
2019	"Rakastuit looseriin (Rakastuin mä looseriin)"	2	Vain elämää kausi 10
2020	"Villi länsi"	1	Non-album singles
2021	"Liike on lääke"	3	Non-album singles
2022	"Vamos"	1	Mun tapa pelata
2022	"Syssymmäl"	13	Mun tapa pelata
2022	"Niin siin vaan kävi" (with SMC Lähiörotat)	19	Non-album single
2022	"Amatimies"	1	Mun tapa pelata
2022	"Viikonloppu"	5	Mun tapa pelata
2022	"Verkkareis" (featuring Ege Zulu and Costi)	4	Mun tapa pelata
2022	"Mun tapa pelata" (featuring Gasellit, Gracias, Juno, Kube, Paperi T, Stepa and Särre)	16	Mun tapa pelata
2022	"Pojatki itkee" (featuring Lauri Haav)	4	Mun tapa pelata
2023	"Purjeissa" (with Samu Haber)	10	Non-album singles
2023	"Oisko tää täs"	5	Non-album singles
2023	"Popinpelko"	30	Non-album singles
2024	"Rallikansa"	1	Rallikansa
2025	"Tili tuli, tili meni"	4	Non-album single
2025	"Rehellisesti"	1	Rallikansa
2025	"Ministerinpaikal"	6	Rallikansa
2025	"Kävi miten kävi" (featuring Emma & Matilda)	1	Rallikansa
2025	"Naadindoo" (featuring Ege Zulu)	1	Rallikansa
2025	"Vielki elos" (featuring Jore & Zpoppa)	11	Rallikansa
2025	"Jääpähän"	6	Rallikansa

Featured in

VilleGalle was also featured in on:

- 2008: "Katkerat savut" by Hulabaloo (Sirkusteltta album)
- 2009: "Siivoo suu poika" by Juno (Kettoteippi album)
- 2009: "Raybanit" by Juno (Kettoteippi album, also featuring ink)
- 2010: "Kuka on lämmittäny mun uunii?" by Gasellit (Gasellit EP, also featuring Juno)
- 2010: "Suomileffas" by Juno (J.K x 2 Tunti terapiaa album)
- 2010: "Hameen alle" by Matinpoika (Vasta kohta album, also featuring Juno, Okku, Jessica & Linda)
- 2010: "Marraskuu" by X23 (X23-12X album, also featuring Kassumato)
- 2011: "Feel Free (Remix)" by Gracias (Gracias EP, also featuring Juno & Paperi T)
- 2012: "Hiki" by Gasellit (Kiittämätön album)
- 2012: "Tytöt (Uusi Fantasia Remix)" by PMMP ("Tytöt" single)
- 2013: "Syö mun suklaata" by Teflon Brothers (Valkoisten dyynien ratsastajat album)
- 2013: "Täs sitä ollaa" by Juno (050187 album, also featuring Matinpoika)
- 2014: "Flexaa" by Cheek (single)
- 2015: "Keinutaan" by Antti Tuisku (single)

=== Other charted songs ===
Year	Title	Charts	Album
Year	Title	FIN	Album
2019	"Ehdottomasti ehkä"	3	Rata/raitti
2019	"Kalenterist tilaa" (featuring Evelina)	4	Rata/raitti
2019	"Lite bättre"	5	Rata/raitti
2019	"Netti ei unohda" (featuring Ibe)	7	Rata/raitti
2019	"Rata/raitti"	8	Rata/raitti
2019	"Spagettipyssyt"	12	Rata/raitti
2019	"Huoli pois" (featuring Pete Parkkonen)	14	Rata/raitti
2019	"Häikäsee" (featuring Reino Nordin)	16	Rata/raitti

== Discography: VilleGalle ==
Singles

Year	Single	Charts	Album
Year	Single	FIN	Album
2015	"Lähtisitkö" (VilleGalle featuring Sanni)	1	
2015	"Puistossa" (VilleGalle featuring Alexandra Babitzin & Jare)	9	
2016	"Peto on irti"	16	

Featured in

Year	Single	Charts	Album
Year	Single	FIN	Album
2013	"Levikset repee" (Sini Sabotage featuring VilleGalle)	1	
2015	"Keinutaan" (Antti Tuisku featuring VilleGalle)	3	
