= List of number-one singles (Finland) =

In this page are contained all the lists of number-one singles from the Official Finnish Charts, the official Finnish music charts that began in 1989. Musiikkituottajat – IFPI Finland, the association of Finnish music industry, publishes currently three separate singles charts: the Official Finnish Singles Chart (Suomen virallinen singlelista) which takes into account both physical singles and digital tracks (singles, promotional singles and non-singles), the Official Finnish Download Chart (Suomen virallinen latauslista), which since February 2007 has listed tracks accordingly to their digital sales, and the Official Finnish Airplay Chart, which since 24 November 2013 has listed tracks accordingly to their airplay. On 5 April 2012و the Singles Chart began to include music streaming in addition to digital and physical sales.

== Weekly singles charts ==
- 1988 · 1989 ·
- 1990 · 1991 · 1992 · 1993 · 1994 · 1995 · 1996 · 1997 · 1998 · 1999 ·
- 2000 · 2001 · 2002 · 2003 · 2004 · 2005 · 2006 · 2007 · 2008 · 2009 ·
- 2010 · 2011 · 2012 · 2013 · 2014 · 2015 · 2016 · 2017 · 2018 · 2019 ·
- 2020 · 2021 · 2022 · 2023 · 2024 · 2025 · 2026

== Milestones ==
=== Singles Chart ===
==== Most weeks at number one ====
Number of weeks	Single	Artist(s)
21	"Penelope" (2020)	William featuring Clever
19	"Teit meistä kauniin" (1998)	Apulanta
13 (tie)	"Join Me in Death" (1999)	HIM
13 (tie)	"Samma gamla vanliga" (remix) (2021)	Cledos, Ibe and Averagekidluke featuring A36
12 (tie)	"Kran Turismo" (2012)	JVG featuring Raappana
12 (tie)	"Despacito (Remix)" (2017)	Luis Fonsi and Daddy Yankee featuring Justin Bieber
11 (tie)	"Missä muruseni on" (2010)	Jenni Vartiainen
11 (tie)	"Poker Face" (2009)	Lady Gaga
11 (tie)	"Rusketusraidat" (2003)	PMMP
11 (tie)	"Ikuinen vappu" (2019)	JVG

==== Most total weeks on the chart ====
Number of weeks	Single	Artist(s)
82	"Tulipalo"	Kuumaa
69	"Shamppanjadieetillä"	Gettomasa and Van Hegen
68	"Ylivoimainen"	Kuumaa
58	"Cha Cha Cha"	Käärijä
57	"Hei rakas"	Behm
53	"Blondina"	Ibe
51	"Blinding Lights"	The Weeknd
50	"Rolling in the Deep"	Adele
49 (tie)	"Over the Hills and Far Away"	Nightwish
49 (tie)	"Penelope"	William featuring Clever

=== Download Chart ===
==== Most weeks at number one ====
Number of weeks	Single	Artist(s)
15	"Missä muruseni on"	Jenni Vartiainen
13	"Poker Face"	Lady Gaga
10	"On the Floor"	Jennifer Lopez featuring Pitbull
9 (tie)	"Liekeissä"	Cheek
9 (tie)	"Mennyt mies"	J. Karjalainen
9 (tie)	"Mun koti ei oo täällä"	Chisu
8 (tie)	"4 Minutes"	Madonna featuring Justin Timberlake and Timbaland
8 (tie)	"Kran Turismo"	JVG featuring Raappana
8 (tie)	"Summer Wine"	Ville Valo and Natalia Avelon
8 (tie)	"Timantit on ikuisia"	Cheek

==== Most total weeks on the chart ====
Number of weeks	Single	Artist(s)
64	"Rolling in the Deep"	Adele
52	"Pauhaava sydän"	Lauri Tähkä and Elonkerjuu
50 (tie)	"Poker Face"	Lady Gaga
50 (tie)	"Silkkii"	Jukka Poika
44 (tie)	"Ihmisten edessä"	Jenni Vartiainen
44 (tie)	"Summer Wine"	Ville Valo and Natalia Avelon
41 (tie)	"Jos sä tahdot niin"	Jippu and Samuli Edelmann
41 (tie)	"Umbrella"	Rihanna
40	"Set Fire to the Rain"	Adele
39 (tie)	"Missä muruseni on"	Jenni Vartiainen
39 (tie)	"Sex on Fire"	Kings of Leon

=== Airplay Chart ===
==== Most weeks at number one ====
Number of weeks	Single	Artist(s)
21	"Epäröimättä hetkeekään"	Elastinen and Jenni Vartiainen
19	"Ram Pam Pam"	Bess
16	"Palavaa vettä"	Lauri Tähkä
13	"Frida"	Behm
12 (tie)	"2080-luvulla"	Sanni
12 (tie)	"Ylivoimainen"	Kuumaa
11	"Piilotan mun kyyneleet"	Haloo Helsinki!
10 (tie)	"Hei rakas"	Behm
10 (tie)	"Muitaki ihmisii"	Vesala
9 (tie)	"Lupaan olla"	Nopsajalka
9 (tie)	"Haluun olla yksin"	Irina
9 (tie)	"Hehkuu"	JVG
9 (tie)	"Valot pimeyksien reunoilla"	Apulanta
9 (tie)	"Tulipalo"	Kuumaa

==== Most total weeks on the chart ====
Number of weeks	Single	Artist(s)
99	"Sä et ole hullu"	Janna
72	"Kylmästä lämpimään"	Anna Abreu
66	"Vadelmavene"	Kasmir
60	"Lupaan olla"	Nopsajalka
57	"Mitä tänne jää"	Erin
54 (tie)	"Me ei olla enää me"	Sanni
54 (tie)	"Roy Orbison"	Stig
54 (tie)	"Sinä ansaitset kultaa"	Jari Sillanpää
51 (tie)	"Olet puolisoni nyt"	Samuli Putro
51 (tie)	"Tykkään susta niin että halkeen"	Juha Tapio

== See also ==
- The Official Finnish Charts
- List of number-one albums (Finland)
- Luettelot Suomen albumilistan ykkösistä vuosittain (1966–1988) (in Finnish)
- Luettelot Suomen virallisen albumilistan ykkösistä vuosittain (1989→) (in Finnish)
- Luettelot Suomen virallisen singlelistan ykkösistä (1951→) (in Finnish)
