= List of artists who reached number one in Finland =

This is a list of recording artists who have reached number one on the singles chart in Finland since January 1995.

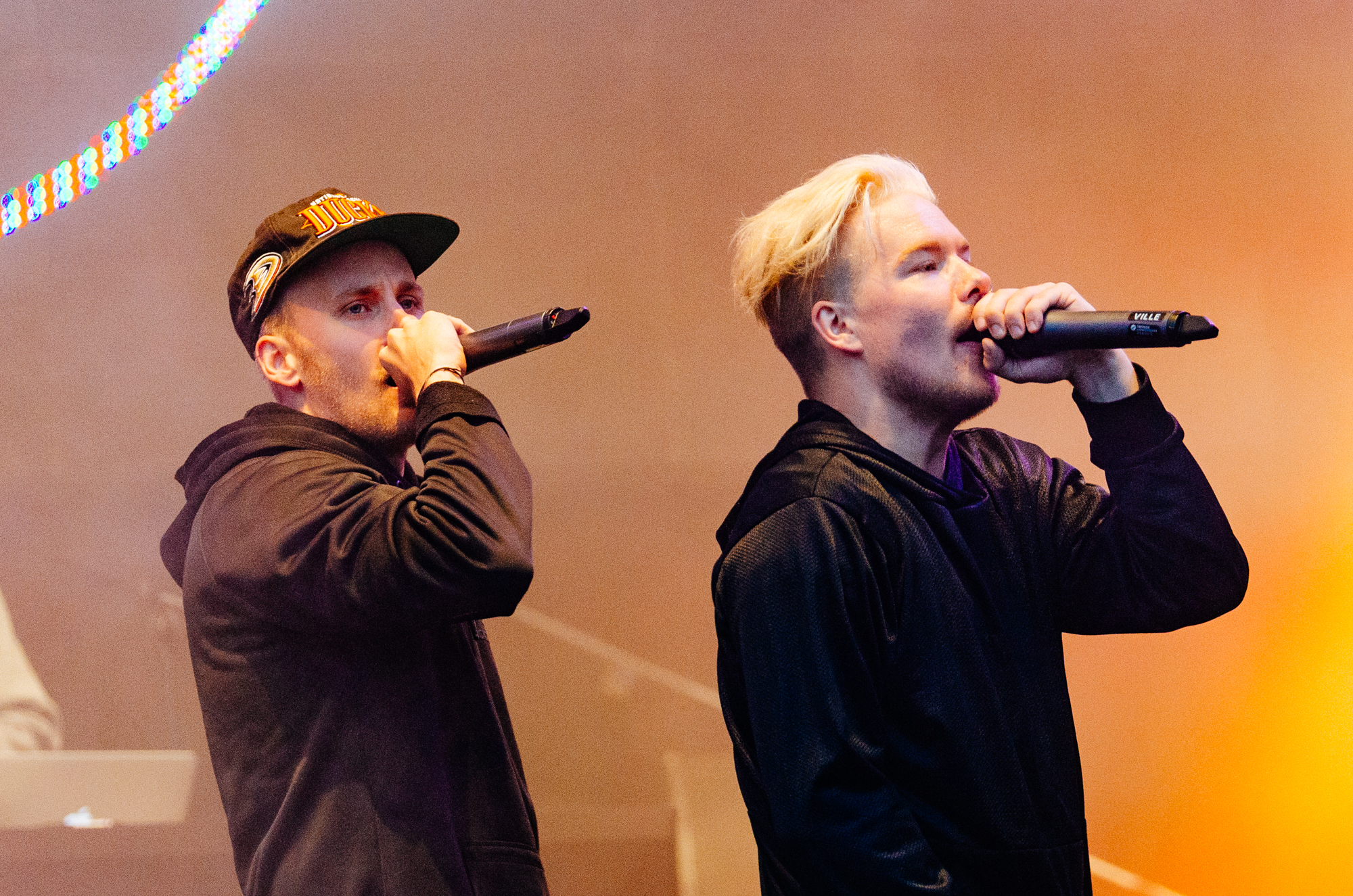
JVG holds the record of most number-one singles with 22.

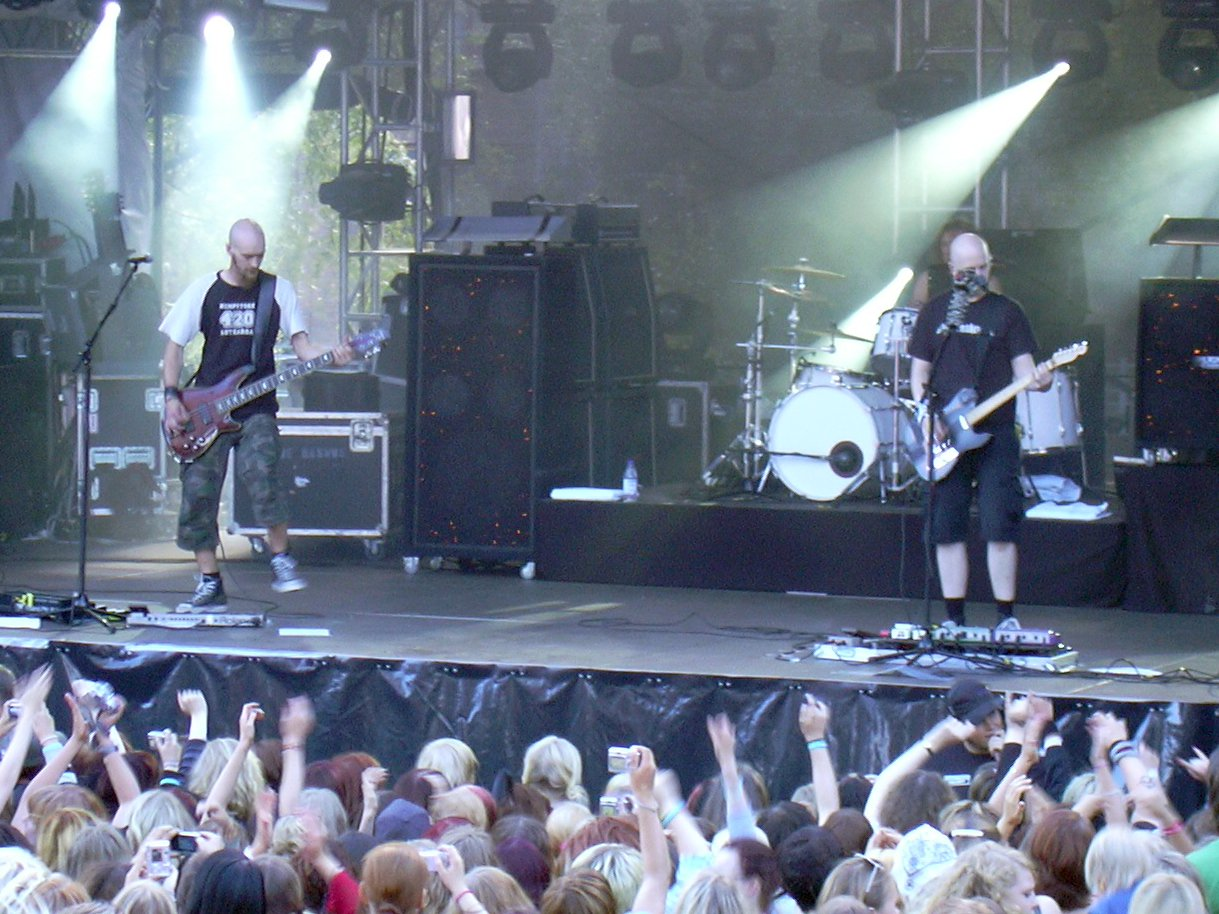
Apulanta holds the record of most number-one singles by a band with 21.

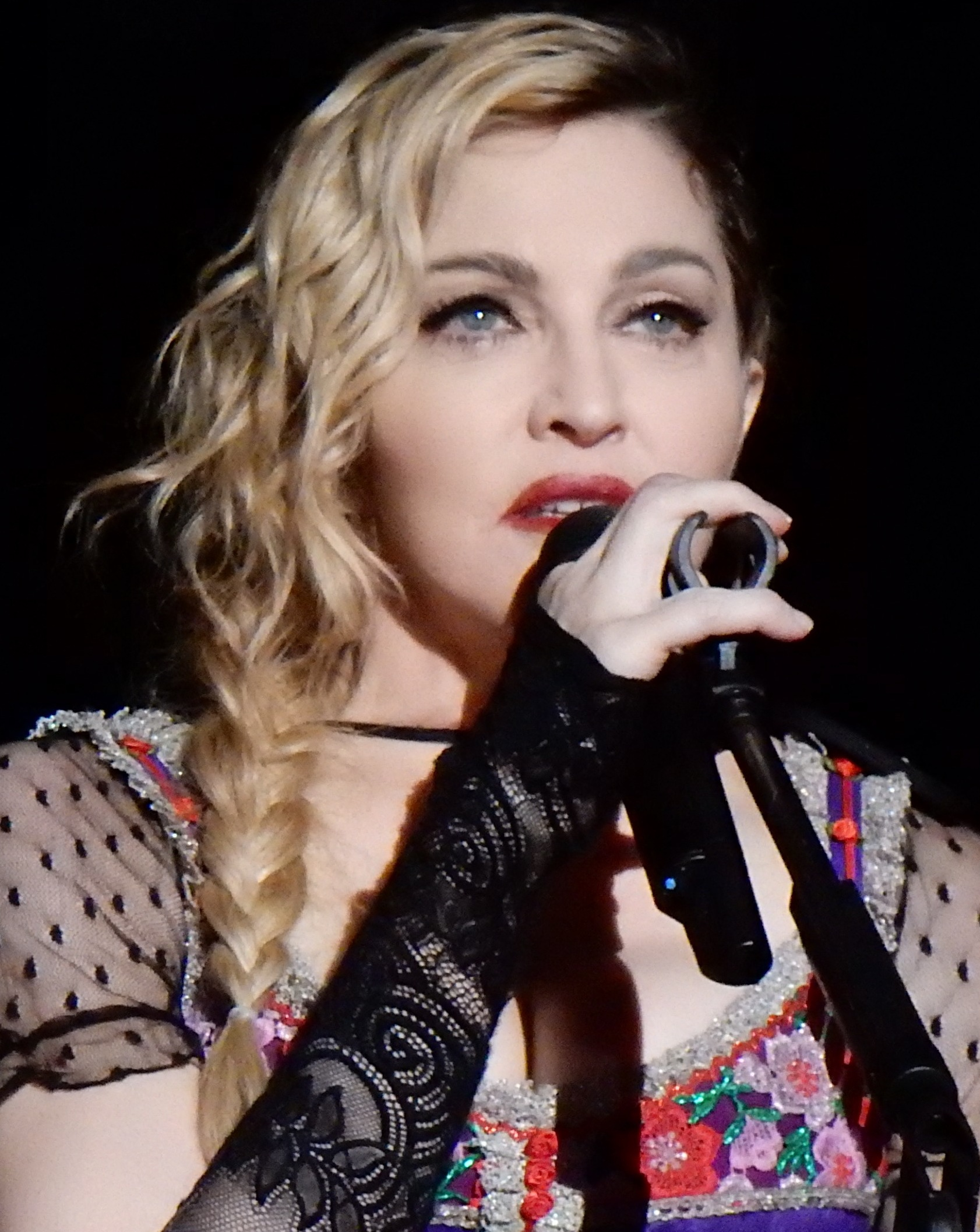
Madonna holds the record of most number-one singles by a female artist with 7.

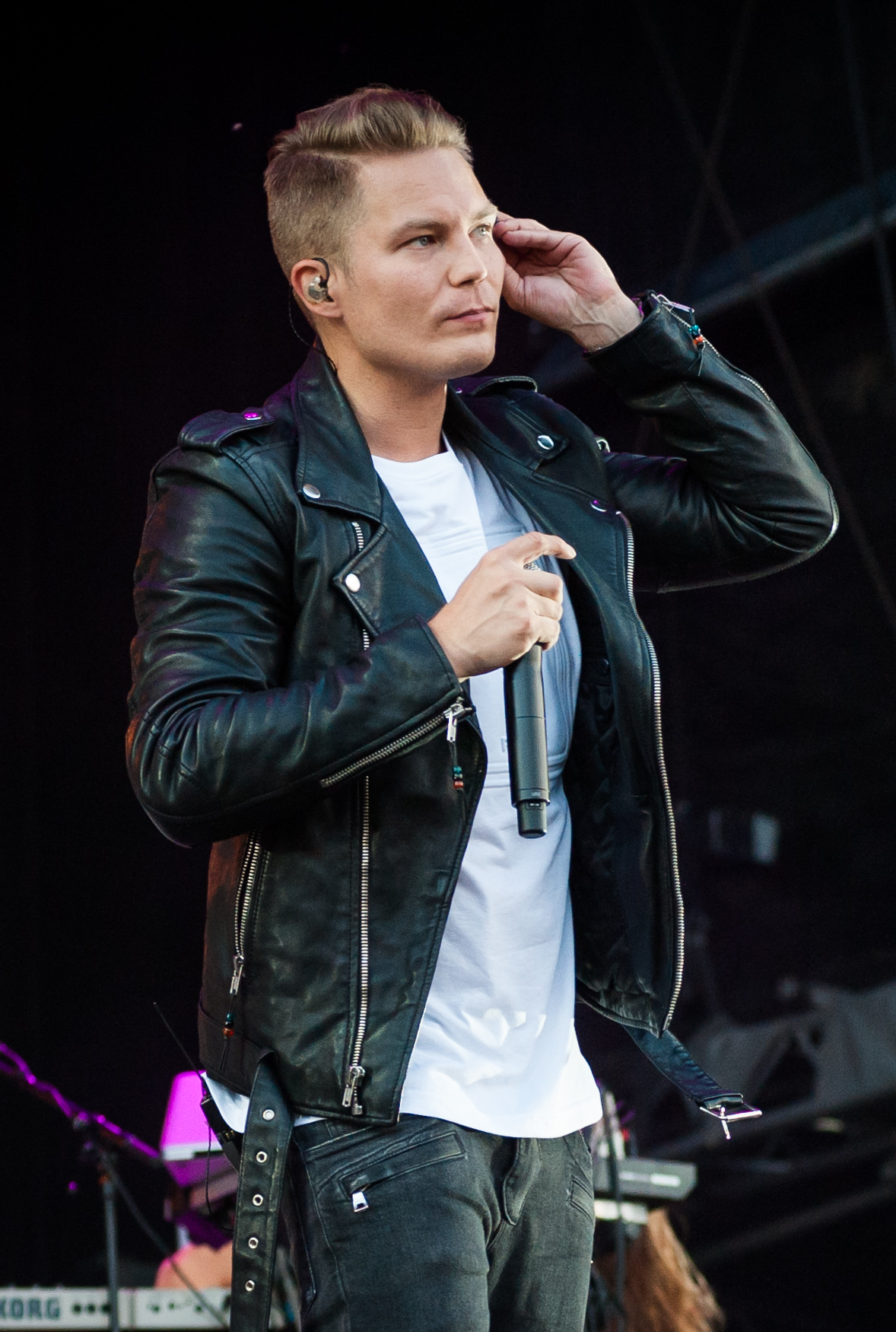
Cheek holds the record for the most number-one songs by a male artist with 18.

- All acts are listed alphabetically.
- Solo artists are alphabetized by last name (unless they use only their first name, e.g. Akon, listed under A), Groups by group name excluding "A," "An" and "The."
- Featured artists that have been given credit on the record are included

== 0-9 ==
- 6ix9ine (1)
- 21 Savage (1)
- 51Kookia (1)
- The 69 Eyes (3)

== A ==
- A36 (1)
- Jonne Aaron (1)
- Abreu (4)
- AC/DC (1)
- Ace of Base (1)
- Adele (3)
- Christina Aguilera (1)
- Ahti (3)
- Aikakone (1)
- Ismo Alanko (1)
- Dr. Alban (2)
- Amorphis (3)
- Nikke Ankara (6)
- Anne-Marie (1)
- Ani (1)
- Erin Anttila (2)
- Koop Arponen (1)
- Apocalyptica (1)
- Apulanta (21)
- Ares (6)
- Averagekidluke (6)
- Natalia Avelon (2)
- Avicii (3)

== B ==
- Jannika B (1)
- Babylon Zoo (1)
- Neljä Baritonia (1)
- The Baseballs (1)
- Sara Bee (4)
- Before the Dawn (1)
- Lou Bega (1)
- Behm (4)
- Bess (1)
- Justin Bieber (6)
- Big Daddy & Rockin' Combo (1)
- Bizi (2)
- Mikko Björk (1)
- The Black Eyed Peas (1)
- Blind Channel (1)
- Bloodpit (2)
- Tuure Boelius (1)
- Bon Jovi (1)
- Boyat (1)
- Musta Barbaari (1)
- Bomfunk MC's (3)
- Brädi (1)

== C ==
- Max'C (1)
- Cantores minores (1)
- Camila Cabello (1)
- Mariah Carey (3)
- Carly Rae Jepsen (1)
- The Chainsmokers (1)
- Charon (1)
- Cheek (19)
- Children of Bodom (7)
- Chisu (3)
- Adam Clayton (1)
- Clean Bandit (3)
- Cledos (7)
- Cliché (2)
- CMX (7)
- Coolio (1)
- Costi (2)
- Miley Cyrus (1)

== D ==
- Gigi D'Agostino (1)
- Dallas Superstars (1)
- Darude (4)
- Davi (1)
- DCUP (1)
- Deep Insight (1)
- Diandra (1)
- Diablo (1)
- Celine Dion (1)
- DJ Snake (2)
- DJ Urho (1)
- Don Johnson Big Band (1)
- Duck Sauce (1)
- Dynoro (1)

== E ==
- Samuli Edelmann (2)
- Eiffel 65 (1)
- Billie Eilish (1)
- Isac Elliot (12)
- Elastinen (9)
- Ellinoora (1)
- Elonkerjuu (3)
- Emma (2)
- Emila (1)
- Eminem (5)
- Ensiferum (1)
- Eppu Normaali (1)
- Etta (1)
- E-Type (1)
- Evelina (3)

== F ==
- Faithless (1)
- Jami Faltin (2)
- Fedde Le Grande (1)
- Feiled (1)
- Fintelligens (3)
- Flo Rida (1)
- Luis Fonsi (1)
- The Fugees (1)

== G ==
- Pikku G (1)
- Mikael Gabriel (8)
- Lady Gaga (4)
- Gayle (1)
- Gettomasa (10)
- The Giant Leap (1)
- Gimmel (2)
- Jess Glynne (1)
- GoodWill & MGI (1)
- Elias Gould (1)
- Ellie Goulding (2)
- Gotye (1)
- Ariana Grande (2)
- David Guetta (4)

== H ==
- Lauri Haav (7)
- Haddaway (1)
- Olli Halonen (1)
- Pilvi Hämäläinen (1)
- Hannibal & Soppa (1)
- Hanoi Rocks (2)
- Calvin Harris (4)
- Adi L Hasla (1)
- Haloo Helsinki! (4)
- Sami Hedberg (1)
- Hevisaurus (1)
- HIM (7)
- Tea Hiilloste (1)
- Hugo (2)
- Don Huonot (3)
- Whitney Houston (1)

== I ==
- [[Ibe]] (3)
- Ida (1)
- Ilari Sahamies (1)
- Enrique Iglesias (1)
- Iron Maiden (4)

== J ==
- Janet Jackson (1)
- Michael Jackson (1)
- Jambo (1)
- Jane (1)
- Järjestyshäiriö (1)
- Vika Jigulina (1)
- Jippu (1)
- Elton John (1)
- Joalin (1)
- Jore (1)
- Joulumantelit (1)
- Judge Bone's Original Monstervision Freakshow (1)
- @Junkmail (1)
- JVG (22)

== K ==
- Käärijä (2)
- KAJ (1)
- Kasmir (1)
- Tuomas Kauhanen (1)
- Kaija Koo (1)
- Aksel Kankaanranta (1)
- Anssi Kela (1)
- Kent (1)
- Kesha (1)
- Alicia Keys (1)
- The Kid Laroi (2)
- Kimbra (1)
- Kinetik Control (1)
- Diana King (1)
- Kings of Leon (1)
- Kiuas (1)
- Wiz Khalifa (1)
- Klamydia (3)
- Kometfabriken (1)
- Korelon (1)
- Kotiteollisuus (7)
- Kotipelto (1)
- Kuolleet Intiaanit (1)
- Kube (1)
- Kuumaa (1)
- Kwan (3)
- Kymppilinja (1)

== L ==
- Lage (1)
- Linda Lampenius (1)
- Las Ketchup (1)
- Ryan Lewis (1)
- Lucas Leon (1)
- Lil Nas X (1)
- Lil Peep (1)
- Lil Pump (1)
- Lilly Wood and the Prick (1)
- Arttu Lindeman (4)
- Jennifer Lopez (3)
- Lord Est (3)
- Loreen (1)
- Lordi (5)
- Los Del Rio (1)
- Louna0nline (1)
- Demi Lovato (1)
- Lovex (1)
- Lucas (1)

== M ==
- M.I.A. (1)
- MØ (2)
- Macklemore (1)
- Madonna (7)
- Major Lazer (2)
- Post Malone (2)
- Mannhai (1)
- Måneskin (2)
- Mariska (1)
- Matilda (2)
- Matti ja Teppo (1)
- Sam Martin (2)
- Maroon 5 (1)
- Jarkko Martikainen (1)
- Nelli Matula (2)
- Ava Max (1)
- Edward Maya (1)
- Shawn Mendes (1)
- Antero Mertaranta (2)
- Metallica (11)
- Lena Meyer-Landrut (1)
- George Michael (1)
- Robert Miles (1)
- Minttu (1)
- Mirella (9)
- Nicki Minaj (1)
- Mish Mash (1)
- Moby (1)
- Mo-Do (1)
- Mokama (2)
- Movetron (1)
- Larry Mullen Jr. (1)

== N ==
- Laura Närhi (1)
- Negative (6)
- Nemo (1)
- John Newman (1)
- Nightwish (14)
- Ninja (1)
- Reino Nordin (1)
- Norther (1)
- Mr. Nordic Bet (1)
- Petri Nygård (4)
- Nylon Beat (1)

== O ==
- Oasis (1)
- The Offspring (1)
- OneRepublic (1)
- Orkidea (1)
- Mr. Oizo (1)
- Olga (1)
- Oliver (1)

== P ==
- Robin Packalen (1)
- Pain Confessor (1)
- Hanna Pakarinen (1)
- Pandora (2)
- Paradisio (1)
- Pete Parkkonen (1)
- Sean Paul (1)
- Pete Parkkonen (1)
- Paperi T (1)
- Passenger (1)
- Passionworks (1)
- Pehmoaino (2)
- Katy Perry (1)
- Peter (1)
- Peewee (1)
- Peer Günt (1)
- Pihlaja (1)
- Pink (1)
- Pitbull (2)
- Pizza Enrico (1)
- Jukka Poika (3)
- Poju (1)
- Portion Boys (1)
- PMMP (2)
- Profeetat (2)
- Eric Prydz (1)
- The Prodigy (7)
- Psy (1)
- The Pussycat Dolls (1)
- Charlie Puth (1)
- Anna Puu (1)
- Pyhimys (4)

== R ==
- A. R. Rahman (1)
- Ramses II (1)
- Rammstein (2)
- Mari Rantasila (1)
- Raappana (1)
- Raptori (1)
- The Rasmus (5)
- Timo Rautiainen (1)
- Redrama (2)
- Reverend Bizarre (1)
- Bebe Rexha (1)
- Rihanna (4)
- LeAnn Rimes (1)
- Ripsipiirakka (1)
- Robin (3)
- Roope Salminen & Koirat (2)
- Run-DMC (2)
- Alexander Rybak (1)

== S ==
- Sini Sabotage (1)
- Sami Saari (1)
- Samuell (1)
- Sani (1)
- Sanni (6)
- Scatman John (2)
- Nicole Scherzinger (1)
- Robin Schulz (1)
- Scooter (2)
- The Scourger (1)
- Sin With Sebastian (1)
- Sentenced (1)
- Sexmane (2)
- Shakira (2)
- Ed Sheeran (3)
- Showtek (1)
- Sia (1)
- Sara Siipola (1)
- Eva Simons (1)
- Sikaduo (1)
- Sinking (1)
- Mikko Sipola (1)
- Smak (1)
- Sonata Arctica (4)
- De Souza (1)
- Spekti (1)
- Stamn1na (1)
- Hank Solo (1)
- Britney Spears (5)
- Spice Girls (2)
- Stig (1)
- Sturm und Drang (1)
- Suburban Tribe (1)
- Suede (1)
- Shèna (1)
- Swallow the Sun (1)

== T ==
- Marita Taavitsainen (1)
- Lauri Tähkä (1)
- Tasis (1)
- Teflon Brothers (3)
- Tehosekoitin (4)
- Justin Timberlake (1)
- Timbaland (1)
- Timo Rautiainen & Trio Niskalaukaus (4)
- Tippa (1)
- Teräsbetoni (1)
- Tarot (1)
- Tones and I (1)
- Antti Tuisku (11)
- Martin Tungevaag (1)
- Tungevaag & Raaban (1)
- Turisti (6)
- Turisti and Averagekidluke (1)
- Tarja Turunen (2)
- Aki Tykki (1)
- Tyrävyö (2)
- A-Tyypp (1)

== U ==
- U2 (3)
- U96 (1)

== V ==
- Martti Vainaa & Sallitut aineet (1)
- Valvomo (1)
- Jenni Vartiainen (3)
- Vassy (1)
- Ves Rain (1)
- Paula Vesala (1)
- Erika Vikman (1)
- Viikate (6)
- Maija Vilkkumaa (1)
- Ville Valo (3)
- Villegalle (1)
- VJ (1)
- L.V. (1)
- Viivi (2)

== W ==
- Waldo's People (2)
- Alan Walker (2)
- Wanz (1)
- The Weeknd (1)
- Kanye West (1)
- Jack White (1)
- Widescreen Mode (2)
- White Flame (2)
- Charlie Who? (1)
- will.i.am (2)
- William (1)
- Juice Wrld (1)

== X ==
- XL5 (1)
- X-Prophets (1)
- XXXTentacion (1)

== Y ==
- Daddy Yankee (1)
- Yb026 (1)
- Lauri Ylönen (1)
- Yö (5)
- Yolanda Be Cool (1)
- YUP (1)

== Z ==
- Zen Café (1)
- Zpoppa and Willem (1)
- Ege Zulu (1)

== See also ==
- The Official Finnish Charts
- Luettelot Suomen albumilistan ykkösistä vuosittain (1966–1988) (in Finnish)
- Luettelot Suomen virallisen albumilistan ykkösistä vuosittain (1989→) (in Finnish)
- Luettelot Suomen virallisen singlelistan ykkösistä (1951→) (in Finnish)
