= Maapallo =

Studio album by Raappana
- Released: 1 September 2010
- Genre: Reggae
- Label: Ylivoima
- Producer: Bommitommi

Raappana chronology
Päivä on nuori (2007)	Maapallo (2010)	Tuuliajolla (2013)

Maapallo is the second solo studio album by a Finnish reggae artist Raappana. Released on 1 September 2010, the album peaked at number one on the Finnish Albums Chart.

== Track listing ==
No.	Title	Length
1.	"Maapallo"	3:59
2.	"Mukavuutta ja luksusta"	4:11
3.	"Kuollut kaupunki"	4:30
4.	"Huolia murheita harmeja"	3:53
5.	"Ei kunnioitusta"	4:03
6.	"Perhesuhteet"	4:49
7.	"Karu totuus"	3:30
8.	"Yksinäistä"	3:53
9.	"Mutsibiisi"	3:39
10.	"Luotu ajamaan" (featuring Jukka Poika)	3:49
11.	"Ei se mitään haittaa"	3:49
12.	"Vasikka"	4:16
13.	"Aikasin heräämistä" (featuring Stepa)	4:44
14.	"Lopussa kiitos seisoo" (featuring Puppa J)	5:18

== Chart performance ==
Chart (2010)	Peak position
Finland (Suomen virallinen lista)	1
