= Mikael Granlund =

Finnish ice hockey player (born 1992)

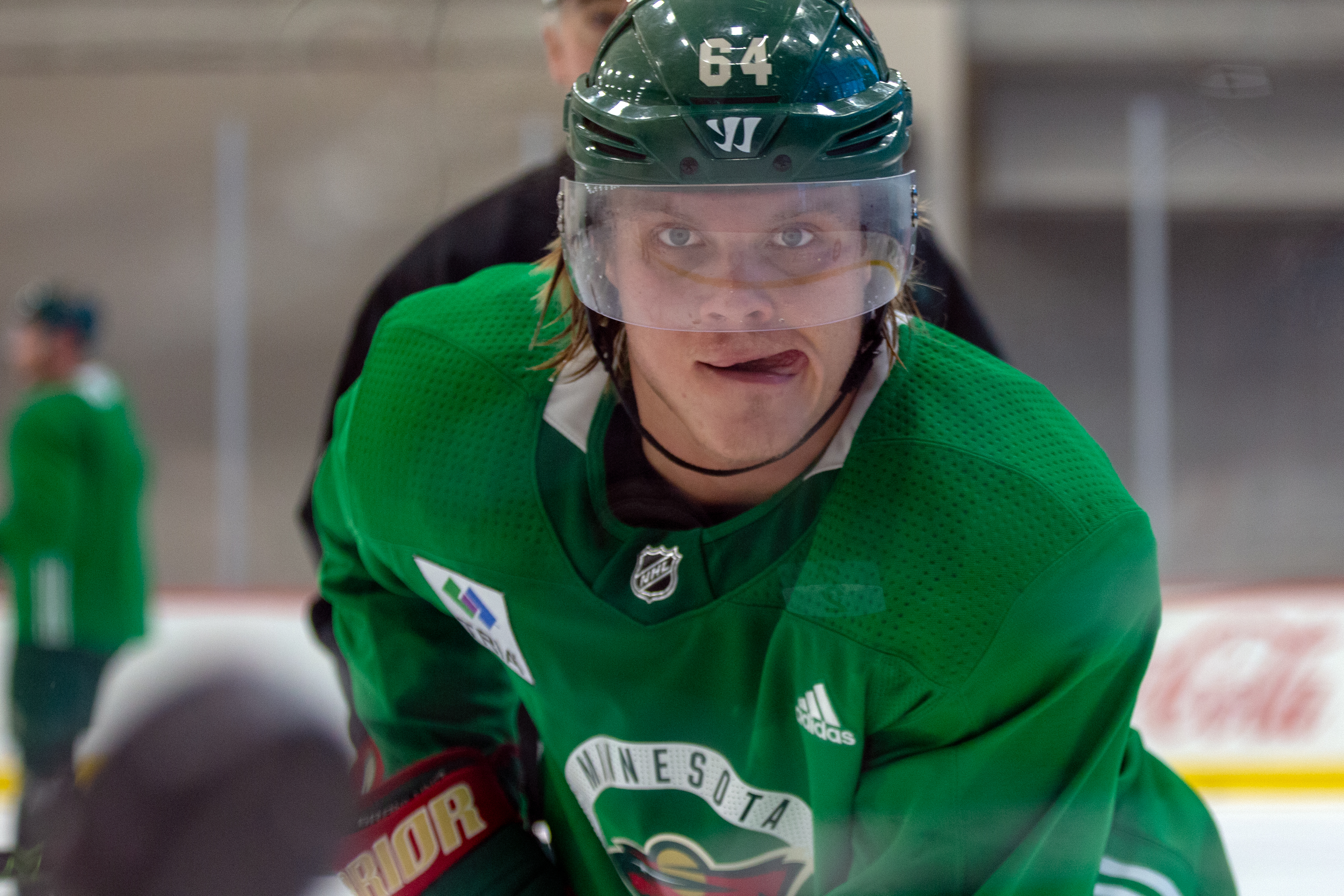
- Granlund with the Minnesota Wild in 2019
- Born: 26 February 1992 (age 34) Oulunsalo, Finland
- Height: 5 ft 10 in (178 cm)
- Weight: 192 lb (87 kg; 13 st 10 lb)
- Position: Forward
- Shoots: Left
- NHL team Former teams: Anaheim Ducks; Oulun Kärpät; HIFK; Minnesota Wild; Nashville Predators; Pittsburgh Penguins; San Jose Sharks; Dallas Stars
- National team: Finland
- NHL draft: 9th overall, 2010; Minnesota Wild
- Playing career: 2008–present

Mikael Antero Granlund (born 26 February 1992) is a Finnish professional ice hockey player who is a forward and captain for the Anaheim Ducks of the National Hockey League (NHL). He previously played professionally in Finland with Oulun Kärpät and HIFK of the SM-liiga and with the Minnesota Wild, Nashville Predators, Pittsburgh Penguins, San Jose Sharks and Dallas Stars of the NHL. He was selected by the Wild as the ninth overall pick in the 2010 NHL entry draft.

== Playing career ==
=== Early career ===
Granlund played junior ice hockey with Oulun Kärpät in 2007–08 and 2008–09, averaging greater than a point per game in both seasons, and was named a first-team All-Star by his junior A league in 2009. He gained his first professional experience late that season, making his debut with Kärpät's team in the SM-liiga on his 17th birthday. He played only two games before he became embroiled in a contract dispute with the team. Granlund and his agent alleged the four-year junior contract he signed with Kärpät in 2007 was invalid because it failed to define what compensation he would get from the team, and that the team had altered the end date on his SM-liiga insurance application from April 2009 to April 2011 without his approval. The team admitted mistakes were made, but that they were made in good faith as both the team and player wished to get him in their top team immediately.

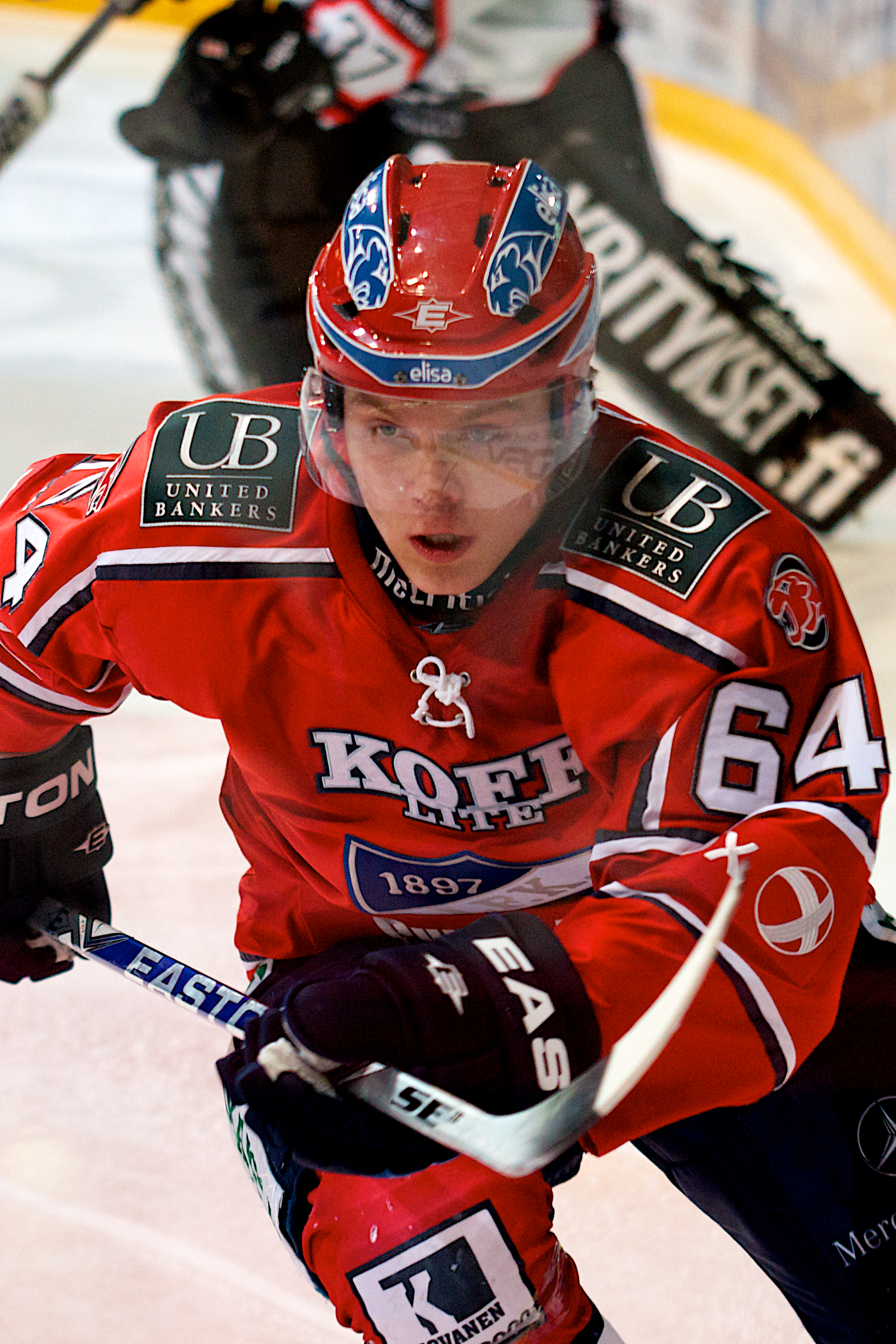
Granlund playing in the HIFK.

Arguing his contracts to be void, and considering himself to be a free agent, Granlund signed a contract with HIFK Helsinki for the 2009–10 season; Kärpät challenged his attempts to transfer to HIFK. Granlund sued his old team in July 2009 after Kärpät failed to relent, asking a court to cancel his contracts with them and clear the way for him to play with HIFK. The two sides reached a settlement a month later, allowing Granlund to transfer to his new team. He scored 13 goals and 27 assists in 43 games with HIFK in 2009–10, and led all rookies in scoring with 40 points. He was named the winner of the Jarmo Wasama Memorial Trophy as the SM-liiga's top rookie, and with only two penalty minutes in the entire season, he also won the Raimo Kilpiö trophy as the league's most gentlemanly player. Additionally, Granlund was voted Finland's young Athlete of the Year for 2009.

Among skaters, Granlund was considered the top European prospect for the 2010 NHL entry draft by the NHL Central Scouting Bureau. While scouts have noted his small size at five feet, ten inches, they were impressed with his vision on the ice. Granlund was ultimately selected ninth overall in the draft by the Minnesota Wild.

As Granlund's contract ran through the 2010–11 season, he returned to HIFK for one more season. Suffering a concussion in mid-October, Granlund was sidelined for over two months, missing the 2011 World Junior Championships as a result. Acting primarily as a playmaker, Granlund was a key player in helping HIFK win the SM-liiga title. Granlund was second in playoff scoring (5–11–16) behind teammate Juha-Pekka Haataja (8–8–16).

In May 2011, HC Dinamo Minsk of the Kontinental Hockey League (KHL) publicly claimed his playing rights because it drafted him one year before his selection by the NHL's Minnesota Wild. However, because of Finland's mandatory military service requirements, Granlund remained with HIFK through the 2011–12 season. Granlund himself has stated he was not interested in playing in the KHL, but planned to play in the NHL.

=== Minnesota Wild (2012–2019) ===
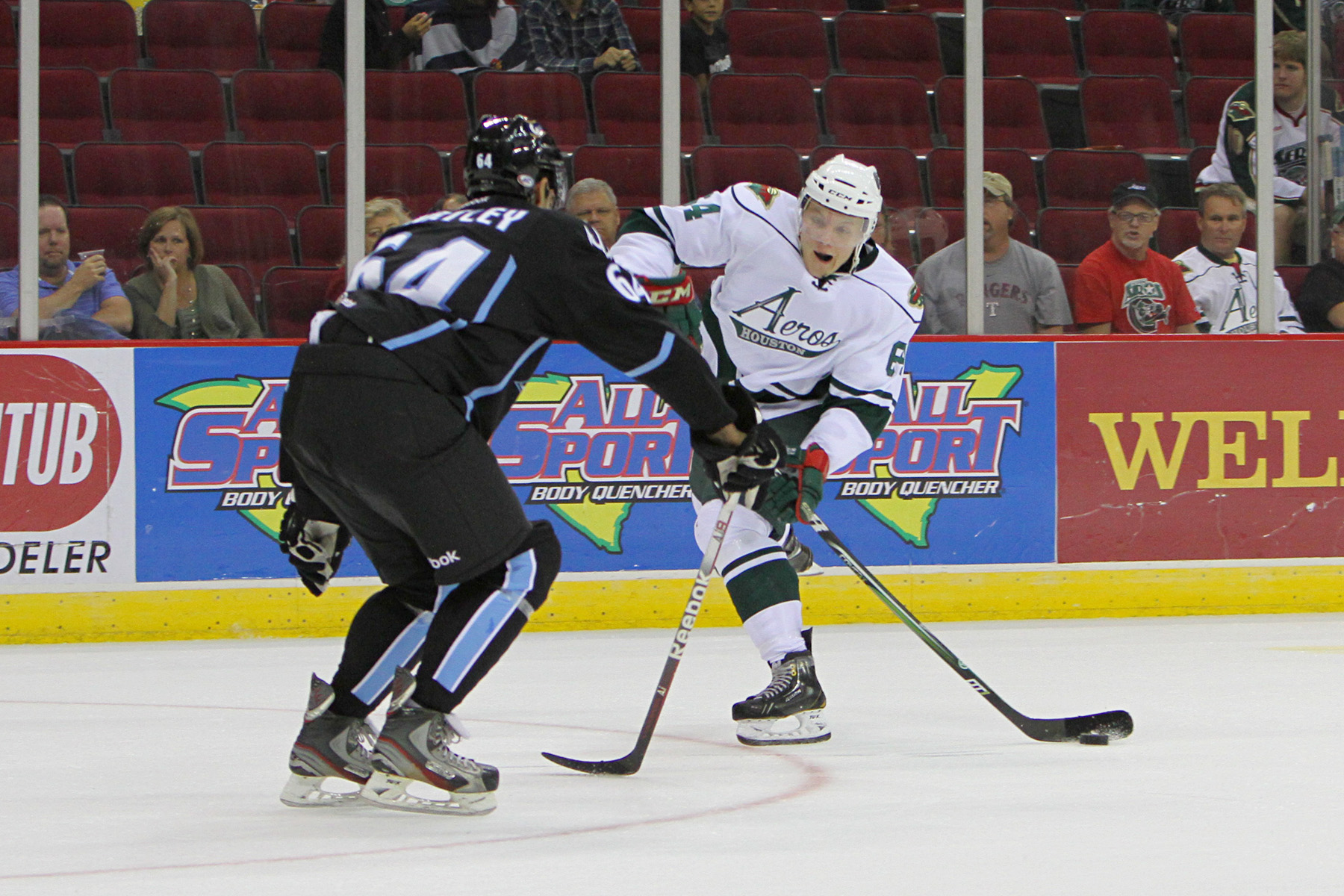
Mikael Granlund (Houston Aeros)

Granlund signed a three-year, entry-level contract with the Minnesota Wild during the 2012 NHL off-season. With the NHL lockout postponing the 2012–13 season, Granlund was assigned to the Wild's American Hockey League (AHL) affiliate, the Houston Aeros, to begin the 2012–13 campaign. After the lockout ended, Granlund was recalled from Houston and made the Wild's opening night roster. In the first game of the Wild's season, he made his NHL debut and scored his first NHL goal, against Semyon Varlamov of the Colorado Avalanche on 19 January 2013.

Granlund's play improved during his sophomore year, scoring 8 goals and 33 assists. Midway through the season, Granlund was moved to Minnesota's top line where he was frequently paired with Jason Pominville and Zach Parise. On 21 April 2014, Granlund scored a goal in overtime to lead the Wild to a playoff victory over Colorado.

In the 2014–15 season, Granlund again played on Minnesota's top line alongside Pominville and Parise, where he recorded 8 goals and 31 assists.

The 2015–16 season saw Granlund centre the Wild's second line with a variety of wingers due to Minnesota's struggle with injuries and line-shuffling. Near the end of the season, interim head coach John Torchetti placed him on the first line wing with fellow Finn Mikko Koivu, leading to a sudden uptick in points production, something Torchetti attributed to being released from the defensive duties often placed on centremen. He played well in the Wild's short playoff run, with Torchetti calling him the Wild's "best competitor".

On 1 August 2017, the Wild re-signed Granlund to a three-year, $17.25 million contract with an annual average of $5.75 million, thereby avoiding salary arbitration.

=== Nashville Predators (2019–2023) ===
During the 2018–19 season, having registered 49 points through 63 games, Granlund was traded by the Wild at the trade deadline to the Nashville Predators in exchange for Kevin Fiala on 25 February 2019. In his first 16 games with the Predators, he struggled to score goals; he managed to do so only once in that time frame.

On 29 September 2020, Granlund informed the Predators he would not be re-signing and that he would test free agency. However, he was unable to secure a satisfactory contract elsewhere, and would end up re-signing with Nashville on a one-year, $3.75 million contract on 23 December 2020.

On 28 July 2021, Granlund re-signed with Nashville on a four-year, $20 million contract.

=== Pittsburgh Penguins (2023) ===
On 1 March 2023, two days before the trade deadline, Granlund was traded by Nashville to the Pittsburgh Penguins, in exchange for a 2023 second-round pick. Having scored 36 points in 58 games over the start of the 2022–23 season with the Predators, he played the last 21 games of the season with the Penguins, scoring 5 points.

=== San Jose Sharks (2023–2025) ===
On 6 August 2023, before the start 2023–24 season, Pittsburgh traded Granlund to the San Jose Sharks as part of a three-team deal also involving the Montreal Canadiens.

=== Dallas Stars (2025) ===
Entering his final season under contract with the Sharks in 2024–25, on 1 February 2025, Granlund, along with Cody Ceci, was traded to the Dallas Stars in exchange for a 2025 first-round pick and a conditional 2025 third-round pick. Granlund was an immediate fit with the Stars, producing 7 goals and 21 points through 31 regular season games. He notched 5 goals and 10 points to help the Stars reach the Western Conference finals before falling to the Edmonton Oilers for the second consecutive season.

=== Anaheim Ducks (2025–present) ===
As a free agent at the conclusion of his contract with the Stars, on 1 July 2025, Granlund was signed to a three-year, $21 million contract with the Anaheim Ducks. On 22 September 2026, ahead of the 2026–27 season, Granlund was named captain of the Ducks.

== International play ==
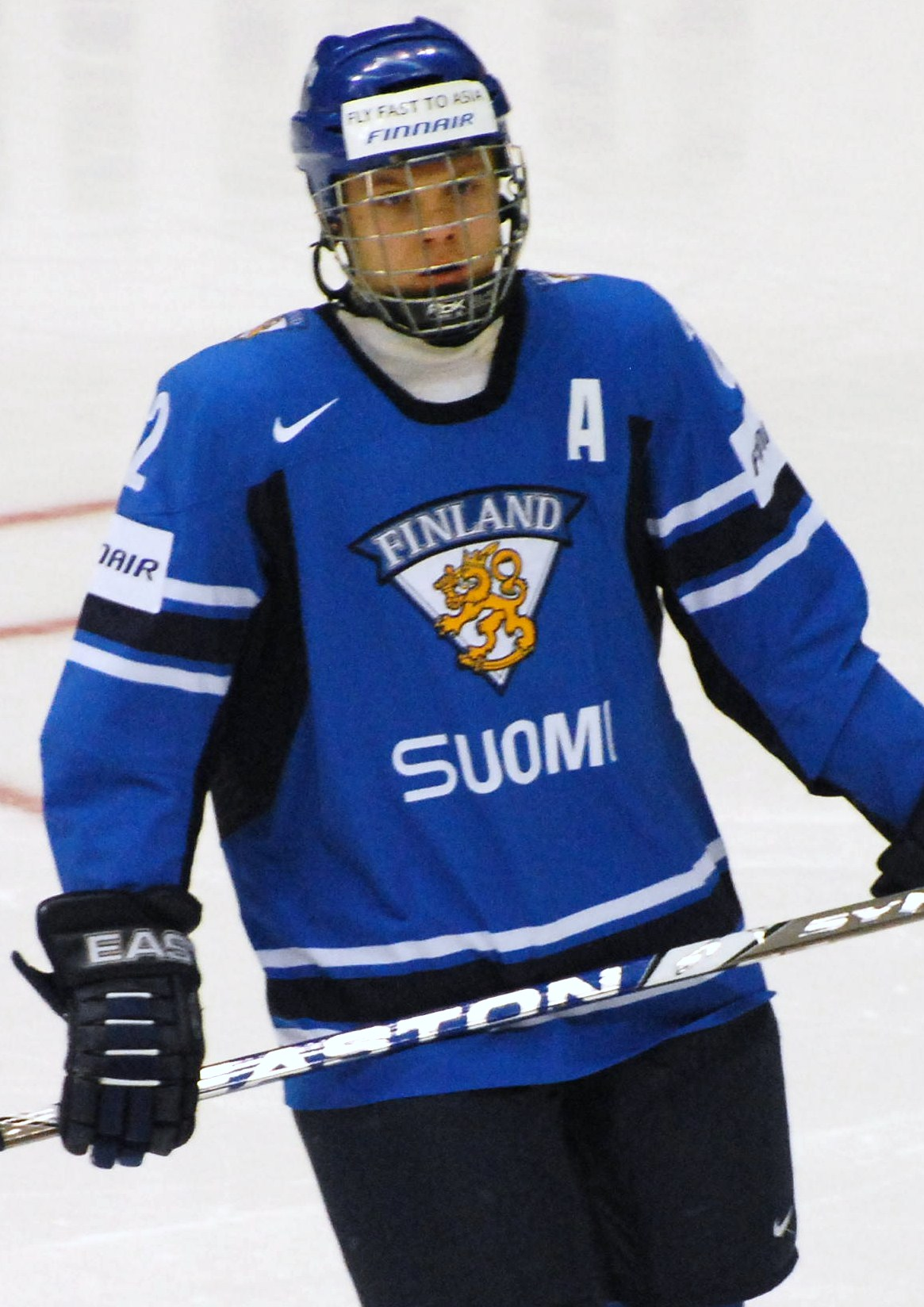
- Granlund at the 2010 World Junior Championships

Medal record

Representing Finland

Men's ice hockey

Winter Olympics
Bronze medal – third place	2014 Sochi	
Bronze medal – third place	2026 Milano Cortina	

World Championships
Gold medal – first place	2011 Slovakia	
Gold medal – first place	2022 Finland	
Gold medal – first place	2026 Switzerland	
Silver medal – second place	2016 Russia	

World U18 Championships
Bronze medal – third place	2009 United States	
Bronze medal – third place	2010 Belarus	

Granlund has played for Finland at both the under-18 and under-20 World Championships in 2009 and 2010. At the 2010 World U18 Championships, Granlund led the tournament in assists with 9, while his 13 total points were third-best as he helped Finland win its second consecutive bronze medal. At the 2010 World Junior Championships, he was Finland's top scorer with seven points as the team finished fifth overall.

Following the 2010–11 SM-liiga season, Granlund made his debut with Finland senior team at the 2011 World Championship. Using the "high wrap" in a full-speed variation, Granlund scored a lacrosse-style highlight reel goal in the semifinal game against Russia, helping Finland win gold.

He represented Finland at the 2026 Winter Olympics and won a bronze medal.

== In popular culture ==
After Granlund's lacrosse-style goal at the 2011 World Championship semifinal against Russia, Finnish Hockey Mafia released the single "Taivas varjele!" featuring sampled comments by Finnish sports broadcaster Antero Mertaranta. The single released the same week of the much-talked about goal reached No. 2 in the Finnish Singles Chart as well as topping the chart for most Finnish Singles downloads that week.

== Personal life ==
Granlund is the older brother of Markus Granlund, who played all or part of seven seasons in the NHL, is a player for Genève-Servette HC. Granlund is a supporter of Liverpool FC. Granlund divorced in 2023.

== Career statistics ==
=== Regular season and playoffs ===
			Regular season					Playoffs
Season	Team	League	GP	G	A	Pts	PIM	GP	G	A	Pts	PIM
2007–08	Kärpät	FIN U18	22	18	22	40	10	5	3	5	8	0
2008–09	Kärpät	FIN U20	35	21	36	57	45	—	—	—	—	—
2008–09	Kärpät	SM-l	2	0	0	0	0	—	—	—	—	—
2008–09	Kärpät	FIN U18	—	—	—	—	—	3	2	4	6	2
2009–10	HIFK	SM-l	43	13	27	40	2	6	1	5	6	0
2010–11	HIFK	SM-l	39	8	28	36	14	15	5	11	16	4
2011–12	HIFK	SM-l	45	20	31	51	18	2	0	1	1	0
2012–13	Houston Aeros	AHL	29	10	18	28	8	5	1	1	2	4
2012–13	Minnesota Wild	NHL	27	2	6	8	6	—	—	—	—	—
2013–14	Minnesota Wild	NHL	63	8	33	41	22	13	4	3	7	2
2014–15	Minnesota Wild	NHL	68	8	31	39	20	10	2	4	6	0
2015–16	Minnesota Wild	NHL	82	13	31	44	20	6	1	2	3	0
2016–17	Minnesota Wild	NHL	81	26	43	69	12	5	0	2	2	2
2017–18	Minnesota Wild	NHL	77	21	46	67	18	5	1	2	3	0
2018–19	Minnesota Wild	NHL	63	15	34	49	20	—	—	—	—	—
2018–19	Nashville Predators	NHL	16	1	4	5	4	6	1	1	2	2
2019–20	Nashville Predators	NHL	63	17	13	30	28	4	0	1	1	2
2020–21	Nashville Predators	NHL	51	13	14	27	14	6	2	3	5	2
2021–22	Nashville Predators	NHL	80	11	53	64	33	4	0	3	3	0
2022–23	Nashville Predators	NHL	58	9	27	36	12	—	—	—	—	—
2022–23	Pittsburgh Penguins	NHL	21	1	4	5	8	—	—	—	—	—
2023–24	San Jose Sharks	NHL	69	12	48	60	32	—	—	—	—	—
2024–25	San Jose Sharks	NHL	52	15	30	45	20	—	—	—	—	—
2024–25	Dallas Stars	NHL	31	7	14	21	8	18	5	5	10	8
2025–26	Anaheim Ducks	NHL	58	19	22	41	18	12	5	5	10	4
Liiga totals			129	41	86	127	34	23	6	17	23	4
NHL totals			960	198	453	651	295	89	21	31	52	22

=== International ===
Year	Team	Event	Result	GP	G	A	Pts	PIM
2008	Finland	U17	6th	5	1	1	2	0
2009	Finland	WJC	7th	6	2	1	3	0
2009	Finland	WJC18	3rd place, bronze medalist(s)	6	2	11	13	0
2010	Finland	WJC	5th	6	1	6	7	4
2010	Finland	WJC18	3rd place, bronze medalist(s)	6	4	9	13	4
2011	Finland	WC	1st place, gold medalist(s)	9	2	7	9	2
2012	Finland	WJC	4th	7	2	9	11	0
2012	Finland	WC	4th	10	1	4	5	0
2013	Finland	WC	4th	4	1	2	3	0
2014	Finland	OG	3rd place, bronze medalist(s)	6	3	4	7	4
2016	Finland	WC	2nd place, silver medalist(s)	10	4	8	12	2
2016	Finland	WCH	8th	3	0	0	0	0
2018	Finland	WC	5th	8	2	7	9	2
2022	Finland	WC	1st place, gold medalist(s)	9	5	6	11	2
2024	Finland	WC	8th	7	0	5	5	27
2025	Finland	4NF	4th	3	3	1	4	0
2026	Finland	OG	3rd place, bronze medalist(s)	6	2	1	3	0
2026	Finland	WC	1st place, gold medalist(s)	7	1	5	6	0
Junior totals				31	11	36	47	8
Senior totals				82	24	50	74	39

== Awards and honours ==
Award	Year	Ref
Liiga
Jarmo Wasama memorial trophy	2010	
Raimo Kilpiö trophy	2010	
Kanada-malja champion	2011	
Finnish ice hockey player of the year	2011	
International
WJC First Team All-Star	2012	
Olympic All-Star Team	2014	
WC All-Star Team	2016	

Awards and achievements
Preceded by Nick Leddy	Minnesota Wild first-round draft pick 2010	Succeeded by Jonas Brodin
Sporting positions
Preceded by Radko Gudas	Anaheim Ducks captain 2026–present	Incumbent
