= List of number-one singles of 1998 (Finland) =

This is the complete list of (physical) number-one singles sold in Finland in 1998 according to the Official Finnish Charts composed by Suomen Ääni- ja kuvatallennetuottajat ÄKT (since late August 2010, known as Musiikkituottajat – IFPI Finland).

== Chart history ==
Physical singles
Week	Album	Artist(s)	Reference(s)
Week 1	"Pop-musiikkia"	Neljä baritonia	
Week 2	"Pop-musiikkia"	Neljä baritonia	
Week 3	"Pop-musiikkia"	Neljä baritonia	
Week 4	"Pop-musiikkia"	Neljä baritonia	
Week 5	"Pop-musiikkia"	Neljä baritonia	
Week 6	"Pop-musiikkia"	Neljä baritonia	
Week 7	"Frozen"	Madonna	
Week 8	"My Heart Will Go On"	Celine Dion	
Week 9	"It's like That"	Run–D.M.C. vs. Jason Nevins	
Week 10	"The Unforgiven II"	Metallica	
Week 11	"It's like That"	Run–D.M.C. vs. Jason Nevins	
Week 12	"It's like That"	Run–D.M.C. vs. Jason Nevins	
Week 13	"It's like That"	Run–D.M.C. vs. Jason Nevins	
Week 14	"It's like That"	Run–D.M.C. vs. Jason Nevins	
Week 15	"It's like That"	Run–D.M.C. vs. Jason Nevins	
Week 16	"(It's) Tricky"	Run–D.M.C. vs. Jason Nevins	
Week 17	"Children of Bodom"	Children of Bodom	
Week 18	"Children of Bodom"	Children of Bodom	
Week 19	"Children of Bodom"	Children of Bodom	
Week 20	"Children of Bodom"	Children of Bodom	
Week 21	"Children of Bodom"	Children of Bodom	
Week 22	"Children of Bodom"	Children of Bodom	
Week 23	"Children of Bodom"	Children of Bodom	
Week 24	"Children of Bodom"	Children of Bodom	
Week 25	"Teit meistä kauniin"	Apulanta	
Week 26	"Teit meistä kauniin"	Apulanta	
Week 27	"Teit meistä kauniin"	Apulanta	
Week 28	"Teit meistä kauniin"	Apulanta	
Week 29	"Teit meistä kauniin"	Apulanta	
Week 30	"Teit meistä kauniin"	Apulanta	
Week 31	"Teit meistä kauniin"	Apulanta	
Week 32	"Teit meistä kauniin"	Apulanta	
Week 33	"Teit meistä kauniin"	Apulanta	
Week 34	"Teit meistä kauniin"	Apulanta	
Week 35	"Teit meistä kauniin"	Apulanta	
Week 36	"Teit meistä kauniin"	Apulanta	
Week 37	"Teit meistä kauniin"	Apulanta	
Week 38	"Pillitä Elli pillitä"	Tehosekoitin	
Week 39	"Teit meistä kauniin"	Apulanta	
Week 40	"Teit meistä kauniin"	Apulanta	
Week 41	"Teit meistä kauniin"	Apulanta	
Week 42	"Teit meistä kauniin"	Apulanta	
Week 43	"Teit meistä kauniin"	Apulanta	
Week 44	"Teit meistä kauniin"	Apulanta	
Week 45	"Pakko päästä pois"	Tehosekoitin	
Week 46	"Pakko päästä pois"	Tehosekoitin	
Week 47	"Here I Go Again"	E-Type	
Week 48	"Here I Go Again"	E-Type	
Week 49	"Mistä Joulupukki tunnetaan?"	Marita Taavitsainen	
Week 50	"Mistä Joulupukki tunnetaan?"	Marita Taavitsainen	
Week 51	"Mistä Joulupukki tunnetaan?"	Marita Taavitsainen	
Week 52	"Mistä Joulupukki tunnetaan?"	Marita Taavitsainen	
Week 53	"Sacrament of Wilderness"	Nightwish	
