= List of number-one singles of 2005 (Finland) =

This is the complete list of physical number-one singles sold in Finland in 2005 according to the Official Finnish Charts, composed by Suomen Ääni- ja kuvatallennetuottajat ÄKT (since late August 2010, known as Musiikkituottajat – IFPI Finland).

== Chart history ==
Issue date	Single	Artist(s)	Reference(s)
Week 1	"Valvon"	Jane	
Week 2	"Bittersweet"	Apocalyptica (feat. Ville Valo and Lauri Ylönen)	
Week 3	"Bittersweet"	Apocalyptica (feat. Ville Valo and Lauri Ylönen)	
Week 4	"Pettävällä jäällä"	Yö	
Week 5	"Maksamme velkaa"	Various artists	
Week 6	"Taivas lyö tulta"	Teräsbetoni	
Week 7	"Taivas lyö tulta"	Teräsbetoni	
Week 8	"Taivas lyö tulta"	Teräsbetoni	
Week 9	"Pahempi toistaan"	Apulanta	
Week 10	"Pahempi toistaan"	Apulanta	
Week 11	"Pahempi toistaan"	Apulanta	
Week 12	"Minä en tiedä mitään"	YUP	
Week 13	"Taivas lyö tulta"	Teräsbetoni	
Week 14	"Out to Find You"	Bloodpit	
Week 15	"Tie"	Viikate	
Week 16	"Tie"	Viikate	
Week 17	"Tyhjä huone"	Antti Tuisku	
Week 18	"Ever-Frost"	Sentenced	
Week 19	"Lissää vinkunaa"	Hannibal & Soppa	
Week 20	"Lissää vinkunaa"	Hannibal & Soppa	
Week 21	"Lissää vinkunaa"	Hannibal & Soppa	
Week 22	"Don't Phunk with My Heart"	The Black Eyed Peas	
Week 23	"Yksi askel liikaa"	Yö	
Week 24	"Gott Nytt År"	Kometfabriken	
Week 25	"Hurricane Season"	Deep Insight	
Week 26	"My My, Hey Hey"	Negative	
Week 27	"My My, Hey Hey"	Negative	
Week 28	"Pelimies"	Martti Vainaa & Sallitut aineet	
Week 29	"Hatehead"	The Scourger	
Week 30	"Pelimies"	Martti Vainaa & Sallitut aineet	
Week 31	"Pelimies"	Martti Vainaa & Sallitut aineet	
Week 32	"Pelimies"	Martti Vainaa & Sallitut aineet	
Week 33	"Pelimies"	Martti Vainaa & Sallitut aineet	
Week 34	"In Your Face"	Children of Bodom	
Week 35	"No Fear"	The Rasmus	
Week 36	"Armo"	Apulanta	
Week 37	"Wings of a Butterfly"	HIM	
Week 38	"Wings of a Butterfly"	HIM	
Week 39	"Tie sydämeeni"	Yö	
Week 40	"Pelimies"	Martti Vainaa & Sallitut aineet	
Week 41	"Uusi ihmiskunta"	CMX	
Week 42	"Benzin"	Rammstein	
Week 43	"Sleeping Sun"	Nightwish	
Week 44	"Sleeping Sun"	Nightwish	
Week 45	"The hjärta & smärta EP"	Kent	
Week 46	"Hung Up"	Madonna	
Week 47	"Hung Up"	Madonna	
Week 48	"Mimic47"	Diablo	
Week 49	"Mimic47"	Diablo	
Week 50	"Mimic47"	Diablo	
Week 51	"Beautiful"	Orkidea	
Week 52	"Yhden enkelin unelma"	Tarja Turunen	
