= Tuuliajolla =

Studio album by Raappana
- Released: 22 March 2013
- Genre: Reggae
- Label: Suomen Musiikki
- Producer: Bommitommi

Raappana chronology
Maapallo (2010)	Tuuliajolla (2013)	Ennen aamunkoittoo (2015)

Singles from Tuuliajolla
- 1. "Kauas pois" Released: 2 November 2012

Tuuliajolla is the third solo studio album by Finnish reggae artist Raappana. Released on 22 March 2013, the album peaked at number five on the Finnish Albums Chart.

== Track listing ==
No.	Title	Length
1.	"Tunnetko samoin?"	5:43
2.	"Kauas pois"	3:44
3.	"Kylmä kivi"	4:09
4.	"Kiertämään"	3:43
5.	"Sateen ropinaa"	4:45
6.	"Lentolehtinen"	4:32
7.	"Tuuliajolla"	5:00
8.	"Soronoo"	3:56
9.	"Riippumaton henki" (featuring Paarma)	4:44
10.	"Kauniita unia"	3:24
11.	"Aika matkaa"	4:40
12.	"Onnelliset ajat"	4:30
13.	"Elämä viel palkitsee"	3:39
14.	"Vääryydet"	3:56
15.	"Otetaan selvää"	5:00

== Chart performance ==
Chart (2013)	Peak position
Finland (Suomen virallinen lista)	5
