= Mielihyvää =

Single by Jukka Poika

from the album Kylmästä lämpimään
- Released: 19 April 2010
- Recorded: 2010
- Genre: Reggae
- Length: 3:48
- Label: Suomen Musiikki

Jukka Poika singles chronology
| "Matalaenergiamies" (2008) | "Mielihyvää" (2010) | "Ikirouta" (2010) |

"Mielihyvää" is a single by Finnish reggae artist Jukka Poika, from his third studio album Kylmästä lämpimään. It was released on 19 April 2010 as a digital download in Finland. The song peaked at number 10 on the Finnish Singles Chart.

== Track listing ==
Digital download
| No. | Title | Length |
|---|---|---|
| 1. | "Mielihyvää" | 3:48 |

== Chart performance ==
| Chart (2010) | Peak position |
|---|---|
| Finland (Suomen virallinen lista) | 10 |

== Release history ==
| Region | Date | Format | Label |
|---|---|---|---|
| Finland | 19 April 2010 | Digital download | Suomen Musiikki |
