= Back to the Stone Age (disambiguation) =

Back to the Stone Age is a novel by American writer Edgar Rice Burroughs.

Back to the Stone Age may also refer to:

- A title from the 1989 album No Anaesthesia! by Finnish thrash metal band Stone
- A number-one single in Finland in 1989 by Stone
- A title from the 2012 album Monster by American hard rock/heavy metal group Kiss
- The phrase "bomb them back to the Stone Age", attributed to American general Curtis LeMay
