= List of number-one singles of 2000 (Finland) =

This is the list of the number-one singles of the Finnish Singles Chart in 2000.

== Chart history ==
Week	Artist	Title
1	HIM	"Join Me in Death"
2	HIM	"Join Me in Death"
3	HIM	"Join Me in Death"
4	HIM	"Join Me in Death"
5	HIM	"Join Me in Death"
6	HIM	"Join Me in Death"
7	HIM	"Join Me in Death"
8	HIM	"Join Me in Death"
9	HIM	"Join Me in Death"
10	HIM	"Join Me in Death"
11	HIM	"Right Here In My Arms"
12	Madonna	"American Pie"
13	Mari Rantasila	"Vain rakkaus"
14	Mari Rantasila	"Vain rakkaus"
15	Mari Rantasila	"Vain rakkaus"
16	Mari Rantasila	"Vain rakkaus"
17	Mari Rantasila	"Vain rakkaus"
18	A-Tyyppi featuring Antero Mertaranta	"Ihanaa Leijonat, ihanaa (Siperia opettaa -remix)"
19	Darude	"Feel The Beat"
20	Darude	"Feel The Beat"
21	Children of Bodom	"Hate Me"
22	Children of Bodom	"Hate Me"
23	Petri Nygård	"Vitun suomirokki"
24	Petri Nygård	"Vitun suomirokki"
25	Petri Nygård	"Vitun suomirokki"
26	Petri Nygård	"Vitun suomirokki"
27	Petri Nygård	"Vitun suomirokki"
28	Petri Nygård	"Vitun suomirokki"
29	Petri Nygård	"Vitun suomirokki"
30	Petri Nygård	"Vitun suomirokki"
31	Petri Nygård	"Vitun suomirokki"
32	Petri Nygård	"Vitun suomirokki"
33	Fintelligens featuring Petter & Peewee	"Stockholm–Helsinki"
34	Fintelligens featuring Petter & Peewee	"Stockholm–Helsinki"
35	Fintelligens featuring Petter & Peewee	"Stockholm–Helsinki"
36	CMX	"Myrskyn ratsut"
37	Cliché	"Why Is It So Beautiful?"
38	Cliché	"Why Is It So Beautiful?"
39	Cliché	"Why Is It So Beautiful?"
40	Cliché	"Why Is It So Beautiful?"
41	CMX	"Jatkuu niinkuin sade"
42	U2	"Beautiful Day"
43	Klamydia	"Ryssä mun leipääni syö"
44	Klamydia	"Ryssä mun leipääni syö"
45	HIM	"Gone With The Sin"
46	Cliché	"Even You"
47	Tyrävyö	"1000 X"
48	Tyrävyö	"1000 X"
49	Tyrävyö	"1000 X"
50	Tyrävyö	"1000 X"
51	Joulumantelit	"Joulun pelko"
52	Joulumantelit	"Joulun pelko"
