= List of number-one singles of 2004 (Finland) =

This is the list of the number-one singles of the Finnish Singles Chart in 2004.

== Chart history ==
Week	Artist	Title
1	Various artists	"Black Night"
2	Various artists	"Black Night"
3	@Junkmail	"Ei koskaan enää"
4	@Junkmail	"Ei koskaan enää"
5	@Junkmail	"Ei koskaan enää"
6	@Junkmail	"Ei koskaan enää"
7	@Junkmail	"Ei koskaan enää"
8	CMX	"Palvelemaan konetta"
9	Timo Rautiainen & Trio Niskalaukaus	"Hyvä ihminen"
10	Hanna Pakarinen	"Love Is Like a Song"
11	Hanna Pakarinen	"Love Is Like a Song"
12	Hanna Pakarinen	"Love Is Like a Song"
13	Kotipelto	"Reasons"
14	Hanna Pakarinen	"Love Is Like A Song"
15	Lordi	"My Heaven Is Your Hell"
16	Antti Tuisku	"En halua tietää"
17	Antti Tuisku	"En halua tietää"
18	Nightwish	"Nemo"
19	Nightwish	"Nemo"
20	Nightwish	"Nemo"
21	Nightwish	"Nemo"
22	Negative	"Frozen To Lose It All"
23	Nightwish	"Nemo"
24	Tehosekoitin	"Lupaan"
25	The 69 Eyes	"Lost Boys"
26	Apulanta	"Pudota"
27	Apulanta	"Pudota"
28	Apulanta	"Pudota"
29	Apulanta	"Pudota"
30	Apulanta	"Pudota"
31	Apulanta	"Pudota"
32	Apulanta	"Pudota"
33	Apulanta	"Pudota"
34	Apulanta	"Pudota"
35	Sonata Arctica	"Don't Say a Word"
36	Children of Bodom	"Trashed, Lost & Strungout"
37	Children of Bodom	"Trashed, Lost & Strungout"
38	Children of Bodom	"Trashed, Lost & Strungout"
39	Children of Bodom	"Trashed, Lost & Strungout"
40	Nightwish	"Wish I Had An Angel"
41	Negative	"Frozen To Lose It All"
42	Children of Bodom	"Trashed, Lost & Strungout"
43	Children of Bodom	"Trashed, Lost & Strungout"
44	Negative	"In My Heaven"
45	Kwan	"Unconditional Love"
46	Britney Spears	"My Prerogative"
47	Bomfunk MC's	"Hypnotic"
48	Bomfunk MC's	"Hypnotic"
49	Nightwish	"Kuolema Tekee Taiteilijan"
50	Jane	"Valvon"
51	Tarja Turunen	"Yhden enkelin unelma"
52	Tarja Turunen	"Yhden enkelin unelma"
