= Kran Turismo =

Single by JVG featuring Raappana
- Released: 11 May 2012
- Recorded: 2012
- Genre: Rap, pop
- Length: 3:22
- Label: Monsp Records
- Producer: Sakke Aalto

JVG singles chronology
"Karjala takaisin" (2012)	"Kran Turismo" (2012)

Raappana singles chronology
"Perhesuhteet" (2010)	"Kran Turismo" (2012)	"Kauas pois" (2012)

"Kran Turismo" is a song by a Finnish rap duo JVG. The song features an appearance by a reggae artist Raappana. The song serves as the second single from JVG's second album jvg.fi. The song spent 12 weeks at number one on the Finnish Singles Chart. A music video was uploaded to YouTube in July 2012. According to IFPI Finland, the single sold 3,187 copies in 2012.

== Chart performance ==
Chart (2012)	Peak position
Finland (Suomen virallinen lista)	1
