= Päivä on nuori =

Studio album by Raappana
- Released: 3 October 2007
- Genre: Reggae
- Label: Ylivoima
- Producer: Bommitommi, Raappana

Raappana chronology
Päivä on nuori (2007)	Maapallo (2010)

Päivä on nuori is the second solo studio album by a Finnish reggae artist Raappana. Released on 3 October 2007, the album peaked at number 18 on the Finnish Albums Chart.

== Track listing ==
No.	Title	Length
1.	"Päivä on nuori"	2:53
2.	"Kotipoika"	4:35
3.	"Maasta maahan"	3:49
4.	"Ainoo"	4:18
5.	"Puhelias suu" (featuring Paarma)	4:40
6.	"Ei jaksa riidellä"	4:54
7.	"Kiusaajat"	3:59
8.	"Karuselli" (featuring Puppa J)	4:40
9.	"Kasvonpiirteet"	4:46
10.	"Maisema"	3:48
11.	"Kun uni ei tuu"	5:36

== Chart performance ==
Chart (2007)	Peak position
Finland (Suomen virallinen lista)	18
