= Ennen aamunkoittoo =

Studio album by Raappana
- Released: 9 October 2015
- Genre: Reggae
- Label: Suomen Musiikki

Raappana chronology
Tuuliajolla (2013)	Ennen aamunkoittoo (2015)

Ennen aamunkoittoo is the fourth studio album by Finnish reggae artist Raappana. Released on 9 October 2015, the album peaked at number 36 on the Finnish Albums Chart.

== Track listing ==
No.	Title	Length
1.	"Liian siunattu"	3:31
2.	"Elä ennenku kuolet"	3:53
3.	"Älä aprikoi" (featuring Aurora)	3:04
4.	"Helleaalto"	3:45
5.	"Lakanoiden alla"	3:49
6.	"Tyttöni tumma"	3:50
7.	"Ystävyyttä korvaa mikään ei"	3:50
8.	"Muutoksii" (featuring Asa)	3:56
9.	"Odotukset"	4:27
10.	"Koskaan ajallaan"	3:53
11.	"Takaisin kotiin"	4:27

== Charts ==
Chart (2015)	Peak position
Finnish Albums (Suomen virallinen lista)	36

== Release history ==
Region	Date	Format	Label
Finland	9 October 2015	CD, digital download	Suomen Musiikki
