= Taivas varjele! =

Single by Finnish Hockey Mafia featuring Antero Mertaranta
- Released: May 2011
- Recorded: 2011
- Genre: EDM
- Label: Sony Music
- Songwriter: Antero Mertaranta

Music video
- "Taivas varjele!" on YouTube

"Taivas varjele!" (English: "Good heavens!") is a Finnish language recording by Finnish Hockey Mafia featuring Finnish sports broadcaster and television personality Antero Mertaranta. The hit recording remixing portions of his broadcast comments he made live during the Russia - Finland ice hockey game on May 13, 2011 in a song.

Mertaranta's comments came after the Finnish national ice hockey team's 19-year-old Finnish player Mikael Granlund scored the game's initial goal giving a crucial first goal to give his country an eventual 3–0 win in the game Finland–Russia in the semi-final of the 2011 IIHF World Championship hosted by Slovakia. When Granlund was behind the goal area, he managed a rare lacrosse-style goal (or simply, in Mertaranta's translated words, "For heaven's sake, what is that? It's a GOAL!"), anchoring the puck on his stick blade, lifting it off the ice, and throwing the puck into the goal.

The title of the song "Taivas varjele!" quotes the Finnish expression used by Mertaranta in response to Granlund's goal during his commentary of the game.

== Chart performance ==
Finnish Hockey Mafia remixed the comments immediately adding musical sections to it. The resulting single was released after the game on Sony Music Finland and became a great hit in the Finland's Official List published by Musiikkituottajat – IFPI Finland. It went in straight at #2 on its week of release. The following week it was still in the charts at #3 before slipping to #5 in its third week of release. It was also the top downloaded track the week of its release in Finland.

Chart (2010)	Peak position
Finnish Singles Chart	2
Finnish Download Chart	1
