= List of number-one singles of 2003 (Finland) =

This is the list of the number-one singles of the Finnish Singles Chart in 2003.

== Chart history ==
Week	Artist	Title
1	Timo Rautiainen & Trio Niskalaukaus	"Tiernapojat"
2	Eminem	"Lose Yourself"
3	The Rasmus	"In the Shadows"
4	The Rasmus	"In the Shadows"
5	The Rasmus	"In the Shadows"
6	Eminem	"Lose Yourself"
7	Eminem	"Lose Yourself"
8	Darude	"Music"
9	Sonata Arctica	"Victoria's Secret"
10	Sonata Arctica	"Victoria's Secret"
11	Negative	"The Moment of Our Love"
12	Negative	"The Moment of Our Love"
13	HIM	"Funeral of Hearts"
14	HIM	"Funeral of Hearts"
15	Fintelligens	"Kaikki peliin"
16	Darude	"Next to You"
17	Fintelligens	"Kaikki peliin"
18	Fintelligens	"Kaikki peliin"
19	Fintelligens	"Kaikki peliin"
20	Fintelligens	"Kaikki peliin"
21	Charon	"In Trust of No One"
22	CMX	"Lepattajat"
23	CMX	"Lepattajat"
24	Don Huonot	"Paha kesä"
25	PMMP	"Rusketusraidat"
26	PMMP	"Rusketusraidat"
27	PMMP	"Rusketusraidat"
28	PMMP	"Rusketusraidat"
29	PMMP	"Rusketusraidat"
30	PMMP	"Rusketusraidat"
31	PMMP	"Rusketusraidat"
32	PMMP	"Rusketusraidat"
33	PMMP	"Rusketusraidat"
34	PMMP	"Rusketusraidat"
35	Kotiteollisuus	"Helvetistä itään"
36	Iron Maiden	"Wildest Dreams"
37	PMMP	"Rusketusraidat"
38	Redrama	"Hang It Up"
39	Redrama	"Hang It Up"
40	Redrama	"Hang It Up"
41	Gimmel	"Sydän pliis särkekää"
42	Gimmel	"Sydän pliis särkekää"
43	CMX	"Melankolia"
44	Ripsipiirakka	"Ota mut"
45	Ripsipiirakka	"Ota mut"
46	Pizza Enrico	"Mita sina sanoa?"
47	Pizza Enrico	"Mita sina sanoa?"
48	Ripsipiirakka	"Ota mut"
49	Ripsipiirakka	"Ota mut"
50	Various artists	"Black Night"
51	Various artists	"Black Night"
52	Various artists	"Black Night"
