= Behm (singer) =

Finnish singer-songwriter and actress

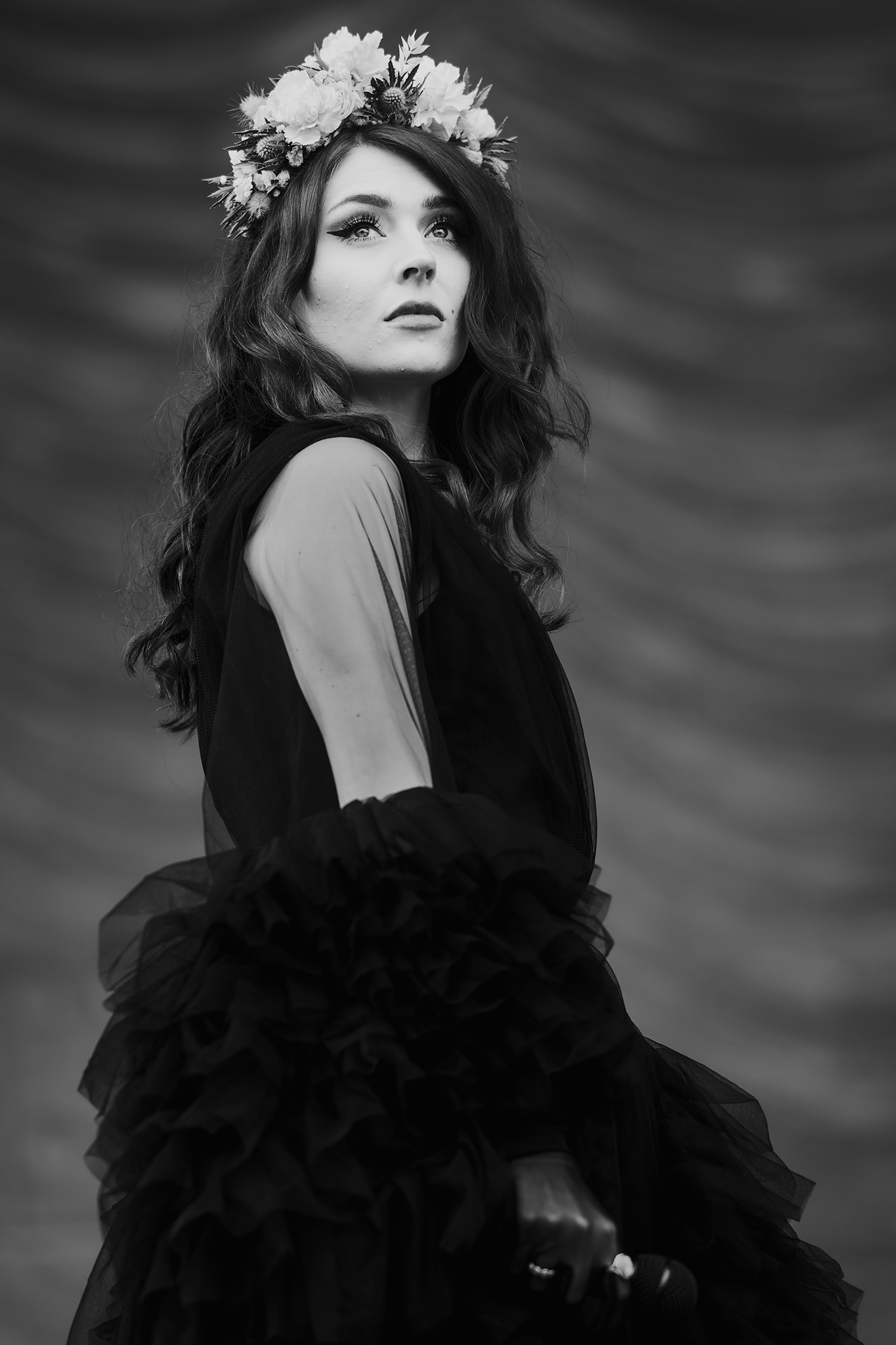
- Behm performing at Ruisrock in 2022

Background information
- Also known as: Behm
- Born: Rita Marketta Behm; 26 October 1994 (age 31); Hollola, Finland
- Genres: Pop
- Occupations: Singer; songwriter
- Instrument: Vocals
- Years active: 2016–present
- Label: Warner Music Finland
- Formerly of: Behm & Ellis

Rita Marketta Behm (born 26 October 1994) is a Finnish singer and songwriter. She uses her surname as her stage name. Behm rose to popularity in 2019 when Warner Music Finland released her hit single "Hei rakas", a number-one hit in Finland for 10 consecutive weeks.

== Career ==
In 2016, Rita Behm, originally from Hollola, participated in a music camp organized by the Finnish rock band Apulanta. Her intention was to further her career as a songwriter. At the camp she met another young singer, Ella-Noora Kouhia, with whom she founded a duo called Behm & Ellis.

In 2017, Behm sang the chorus for rapper Pikku G's hit single "Solmussa", and consequently began working on her debut album. The first single from the album, "Hei rakas", became a big hit in Finnish charts in 2019, holding number one position for 10 consequtive weeks and ending up being one of the most played singles on Finnish radio stations in 2019 and 2020. In March 2020, the second single "Tivolit" was released and, in July, the third single "Frida". Behm's debut album titled Draaman kaari viehättää was released in September 2020 and sold platinum already before it went out. All of the albums 10 songs charted on Finnish Spotify following the release.

In 2021, Behm received four awards in Iskelmägaala. She also won seven awards in Emma-gaala, including the awards for Artist of the Year, Album of the Year, Newcomer of the Year, Pop Artist of the Year, Finnish Artist of the Year (audience vote), and Best Selling Domestic Album of the Year.

Behm's sophomore album, "Merkittävät erot", was released in September 2023. It debuted at #1 in the official Finnish album chart.

== Personal life ==
Behm was in a relationship with writer Miki Liukkonen from 2022 until May 2023.

== Discography ==
=== Albums ===
Albums by Behm, with selected chart positions
Year	Album	Peak positions
Year	Album	FIN
2020	Draaman kaari viehättää	1
2023	Merkittävät erot	1

=== Singles ===
- "Hei rakas" (2019)
- "Tivolit" (2020)
- "Frida" (2020)
- "Lupaan" (2020)
- "Ethän tarkoittanut sitä" (2022)
- "Sata vuotta" (2023)
- "Viimeinen tanssi" (feat. Olavi Uusivirta) (2023)
- "Kaiken arvoinen" (2025)

As a featured artist

- "Solmussa" (2017 single by Pikku G)
- "Valot" (2018 single by Ollie)
- "Pahoja tapoja" (2018 single by edi)
- "Vanha" (2019 single by Keko Salata)
- "Life (Sun luo)" (2021 single by Cledos)
- "Tunnista tuntiin" (2024 single by Ege Zulu)
