= List of number-one singles of 1990 (Finland) =

This is the list of the number-one singles of the Finnish Singles Chart in 1990.

== History ==
Issue date	Artist	Title
January 4	Bat & Ryyd	"Ryyd-joulu"
January 18	Lättykettu & Tehosekoittajat	"Letkautus"
February 1	Technotronic	"Get Up! (Before the Night Is Over)"
February 15	Technotronic	"Get Up! (Before the Night Is Over)"
March 1	Sinéad O'Connor	"Nothing Compares 2 U"
March 15	Raptori	"Oi beibi" / "Tuhansien sulojen maa"
March 29	Raptori	"Oi beibi" / "Tuhansien sulojen maa"
April 12	Raptori	"Oi beibi" / "Tuhansien sulojen maa"
April 26	Raptori	"Oi beibi" / "Tuhansien sulojen maa"
May 10	Raptori	"Raptori"
May 24	Madonna	"Vogue"
June 12	ZZ Top	"Doubleback"
June 26	Eppu Normaali	"Sydän tyhjää lyö"
July 10	Guru Josh	"Whose Law (Is It Anyway?)"
July 31	Madonna	"Hanky Panky"
August 14	MC Nikke T	"Jos haluu saada"
August 28	MC Nikke T	"Jos haluu saada"
September 10	Eppu Normaali	"Tahroja paperilla"
September 24	AC/DC	"Thunderstruck"
October 8	Pet Shop Boys	"So Hard"
October 22	Pet Shop Boys	"So Hard"
November 5	MC Nikke T	"Ihminen ei voi elää vetämättä"
November 19	MC Nikke T	"Ihminen ei voi elää vetämättä"
December 3	Londonbeat	"I've Been Thinking About You"
December 17	Madonna	"Justify My Love"
