= Miki Liukkonen =

Finnish writer, poet and musician (1989–2023)

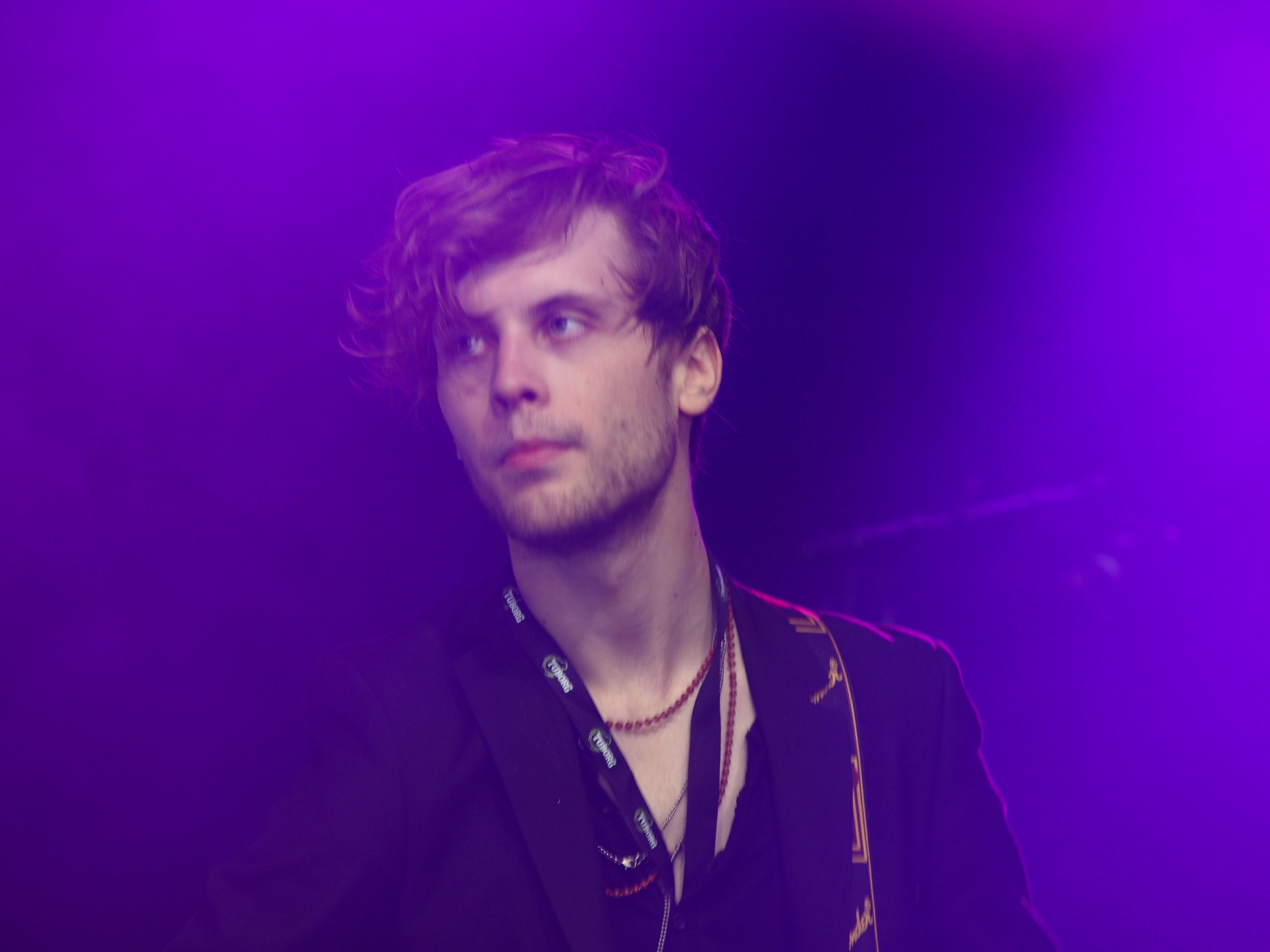
Liukkonen in 2013

Miki Matias Juhani Liukkonen (8 July 1989 – 4 July 2023) was a Finnish writer, poet and musician. He wrote five novels, the last of which, Vierastila, was released posthumously in September 2023 and nominated for a Finlandia Prize. Liukkonen had previously received one nomination for his 2017 novel O.

Liukkonen played guitar in an alternative rock band The Scenes, and hosted a television talk show Miki Liukkonen, sivullinen.

== Personal life and death ==
Liukkonen was born in Oulu, but later moved to Helsinki.

He openly discussed his addiction to alcohol, which led to him becoming a teetotaller in 2020.

Liukkonen was in a relationship with singer and songwriter Behm from 2022 until the spring of 2023.

Liukkonen died by suicide on 4 July 2023, at the age of 33. He had spoken openly about struggling with his mental health issues in the past and posted on Instagram in late May 2023 about the deterioration of his mental state.

== Selected bibliography ==
=== Novels ===
- Lapset auringon alla (2013)
- O (2017)
- Hiljaisuuden mestari (2019)
- Elämä: esipuhe (2021)
- Vierastila (2023)

=== Poetry books ===
- Valkoisia runoja (2011)
- Elisabet (2012)
- Raivon historia (2015)
