= JVG =

JVG could be:

- Jeff Van Gundy, American basketball coach, abbreviated as JVG
- JVG (band), Finnish rap duo formerly known as Jare & VilleGalle
- JVG Racing, a racing team in FIA GT Championship for 2001 to 2004
