= List of number-one singles of 2002 (Finland) =

This is the list of the number-one singles of the Finnish Singles Chart in 2002.

== Chart history ==
Week	Artist	Title
1	Anssi Kela	"Milla"
2	The 69 Eyes	"Dance d'amour"
3	The 69 Eyes	"Dance d'amour"
4	The 69 Eyes	"Dance d'amour"
5	The 69 Eyes	"Dance d'amour"
6	The 69 Eyes	"Dance d'amour"
7	Shakira	"Whenever, Wherever"
8	Bomfunk MC's featuring Max'C	"Live Your Life"
9	Timo Rautiainen & Trio Niskalaukaus	"Surupuku"
10	Timo Rautiainen & Trio Niskalaukaus	"Surupuku"
11	Timo Rautiainen & Trio Niskalaukaus	"Surupuku"
12	The Rasmus	"Heartbreaker/Days"
13	The Rasmus	"Heartbreaker/Days"
14	The Rasmus	"Heartbreaker/Days"
15	The Rasmus	"Heartbreaker/Days"
16	The Rasmus	"Heartbreaker/Days"
17	Hanoi Rocks	"People Like Me"
18	Hanoi Rocks	"People Like Me"
19	Nightwish	"Ever Dream"
20	Nightwish	"Ever Dream"
21	Nightwish	"Ever Dream"
22	Nightwish	"Ever Dream"
23	Apulanta	"Saasta"
24	Apulanta	"Saasta"
25	Apulanta	"Saasta"
26	Apulanta	"Saasta"
27	Kwan	"Rain"
28	Kwan	"Rain"
29	Kwan	"Rain"
30	Lordi	"Would You Love a Monsterman?"
31	Nightwish	"Bless the Child"
32	Nightwish	"Bless the Child"
33	Nightwish	"Bless the Child"
34	Zen Café	"Aamuisin"
35	Tyrävyö	"Kuka vei kaiken"
36	Timo Rautiainen & Trio Niskalaukaus	"Lumessakahlaajat"
37	Las Ketchup	"The Ketchup Song"
38	Children of Bodom	"You're Better Off Dead!"
39	Children of Bodom	"You're Better Off Dead!"
40	Las Ketchup	"The Ketchup Song (Asereje)"
41	Las Ketchup	"The Ketchup Song (Asereje)"
42	Las Ketchup	"The Ketchup Song (Asereje)"
43	Las Ketchup	"The Ketchup Song (Asereje)"
44	Gimmel	"Etsit muijaa seuraavaa"
45	Gimmel	"Etsit muijaa seuraavaa"
46	Gimmel	"Etsit muijaa seuraavaa"
47	Gimmel	"Etsit muijaa seuraavaa"
48	Timo Rautiainen & Trio Niskalaukaus	"Tiernapojat"
49	Timo Rautiainen & Trio Niskalaukaus	"Tiernapojat"
50	Timo Rautiainen & Trio Niskalaukaus	"Tiernapojat"
51	Timo Rautiainen & Trio Niskalaukaus	"Tiernapojat"
52	Timo Rautiainen & Trio Niskalaukaus	"Tiernapojat"
