= List of number-one singles of 2001 (Finland) =

This is the list of the number-one singles of the Finnish Singles Chart in 2001.

== Chart history ==
Week	Artist	Title
1	LeAnn Rimes	"Can't Fight the Moonlight"
2	Jennifer Lopez	"Love Don't Cost a Thing"
3	Eminem	"Stan"
4	LeAnn Rimes	"Can't Fight the Moonlight"
5	Amorphis	"Alone"
6	Amorphis	"Alone"
7	Amorphis	"Alone"
8	Apulanta	"Viivakoodit"
9	Apulanta	"Viivakoodit"
10	Apulanta	"Viivakoodit"
11	Apulanta	"Viivakoodit"
12	Apulanta	"Viivakoodit"
13	Apulanta	"Viivakoodit"
14	Apulanta	"Viivakoodit"
15	The Rasmus	"F-F-F-Falling"
16	The Rasmus	"F-F-F-Falling"
17	The Rasmus	"F-F-F-Falling"
18	The Rasmus	"F-F-F-Falling"
19	The Rasmus	"F-F-F-Falling"
20	Apulanta	"Reunalla"
21	Apulanta	"Reunalla"
22	The Rasmus	"F-F-F-Falling"
23	The Rasmus	"F-F-F-Falling"
24	Nightwish	"Over the Hills and Far Away"
25	Nightwish	"Over the Hills and Far Away"
26	Nightwish	"Over the Hills and Far Away"
27	HIM	"Pretending"
28	HIM	"Pretending"
29	HIM	"Pretending"
30	HIM	"Pretending"
31	Nightwish	"Over the Hills and Far Away"
32	HIM	"Pretending"
33	Nightwish	"Over the Hills and Far Away"
34	Suburban Tribe	"Frozen Ashes"
35	Kwan	"Late"
36	Kwan	"Late"
37	Kwan	"Late"
38	Apulanta	"Kadut"
39	Apulanta	"Kadut"
40	Apulanta	"Kadut"
41	Bomfunk MC's	"Super Electric"
42	Bomfunk MC's	"Super Electric"
43	Bomfunk MC's	"Super Electric"
44	Bomfunk MC's	"Super Electric"
45	Bomfunk MC's	"Super Electric"
46	Anssi Kela	"Milla"
47	Anssi Kela	"Milla"
48	Anssi Kela	"Milla"
49	Anssi Kela	"Milla"
50	Anssi Kela	"Milla"
51	Anssi Kela	"Milla"
52	Anssi Kela	"Milla"
