= List of number-one singles of 1996 (Finland) =

This is the list of the number-one singles of the Finnish Singles Chart in 1996.

Issue date	Song	Artist
1/1996	"Gangsta's Paradise"	Coolio featuring L.V.
2/1996	"Jesus to a Child"	George Michael
3/1996	"Jesus to a Child"	George Michael
4/1996	"Jesus to a Child"	George Michael
5/1996	"Spaceman"	Babylon Zoo
6/1996	"Spaceman"	Babylon Zoo
7/1996	"Spaceman"	Babylon Zoo
8/1996	"Spaceman"	Babylon Zoo
9/1996	"Spaceman"	Babylon Zoo
10/1996	"Born In Africa"	Dr. Alban
11/1996	"Kaunis peto"	XL5
12/1996	"Kaunis peto"	XL5
13/1996	"Firestarter"	The Prodigy
14/1996	"Firestarter"	The Prodigy
15/1996	"Firestarter"	The Prodigy
16/1996	"Firestarter"	The Prodigy
17/1996	"Firestarter"	The Prodigy
18/1996	"Children"	Robert Miles
19/1996	"Children"	Robert Miles
20/1996	"Children"	Robert Miles
21/1996	"Until It Sleeps"	Metallica
22/1996	"Until It Sleeps"	Metallica
23/1996	"Until It Sleeps"	Metallica
24/1996	"Until It Sleeps"	Metallica
25/1996	"Theme from Mission: Impossible"	Adam Clayton & Larry Mullen, Jr.
26/1996	"Macarena"	Los del Río
27/1996	"Killing Me Softly"	The Fugees
28/1996	"Killing Me Softly"	The Fugees
29/1996	"Killing Me Softly"	The Fugees
30/1996	"Killing Me Softly"	The Fugees
31/1996	"Killing Me Softly"	The Fugees
32/1996	"Killing Me Softly"	The Fugees
33/1996	"Killing Me Softly"	The Fugees
34/1996	"Trash"	Suede
35/1996	"Trash"	Suede
36/1996	"Wannabe"	Spice Girls
37/1996	"Insomnia"	Faithless
38/1996	"Insomnia"	Faithless
39/1996	"Insomnia"	Faithless
40/1996	"Insomnia"	Faithless
41/1996	"Insomnia"	Faithless
42/1996	"Insomnia"	Faithless
43/1996	"Insomnia"	Faithless
44/1996	"Say You'll Be There"	Spice Girls
45/1996	"Insomnia"	Faithless
46/1996	"Insomnia"	Faithless
47/1996	"Breathe"	The Prodigy
48/1996	"Breathe"	The Prodigy
49/1996	"Breathe"	The Prodigy
50/1996	"Breathe"	The Prodigy
51/1996	"Anna mulle piiskaa"	Apulanta
52/1996	"Anna mulle piiskaa"	Apulanta
