= Kauas pois =

Single by Raappana

from the album Tuuliajolla
- Released: 2 November 2012
- Recorded: 2012
- Genre: Reggae
- Length: 3:44
- Label: KHY Suomen Musiikki Oy
- Producer(s): Bommitommi

"Kauas pois" is a song by a Finnish reggae artist Raappana. It was released as a single on 2 November 2012 and served as the first single from his third studio album Tuuliajolla. The accompanying music video was uploaded to YouTube on 25 October 2012.

== Chart performance ==
"Kauas pois" peaked at number four on the Official Finnish Download Chart and at number 14 on the Finnish Singles Chart.

Chart (2012)	Peak position
Finland (Suomen virallinen lista)	14
