= Silkkii =

Single by Jukka Poika

from the album Yhdestä puusta
- Released: 23 May 2011
- Recorded: 2011
- Genre: Reggae
- Length: 3:45
- Label: Suomen Musiikki

Jukka Poika singles chronology
"Kylmästä lämpimään" (2011)	"Silkkii" (2011)	"Älä tyri nyt" (2012)

"Silkkii" is a single by Finnish reggae artist Jukka Poika, from his fourth studio album Yhdestä puusta. It was released on 23 May 2011 as a digital download in Finland. The song peaked at number one on the Finnish Singles Chart.

== Track listing ==
Digital download
No.	Title	Length
1.	"Silkkii"	3:45
2.	"Silkkii" (Instrumental)	3:46

== Chart performance ==
Chart (2011)	Peak position
Finland (Suomen virallinen lista)	1

== Release history ==
Region	Date	Format	Label
Finland	23 May 2011	Digital download	Suomen Musiikki
