= Raappana (musician) =

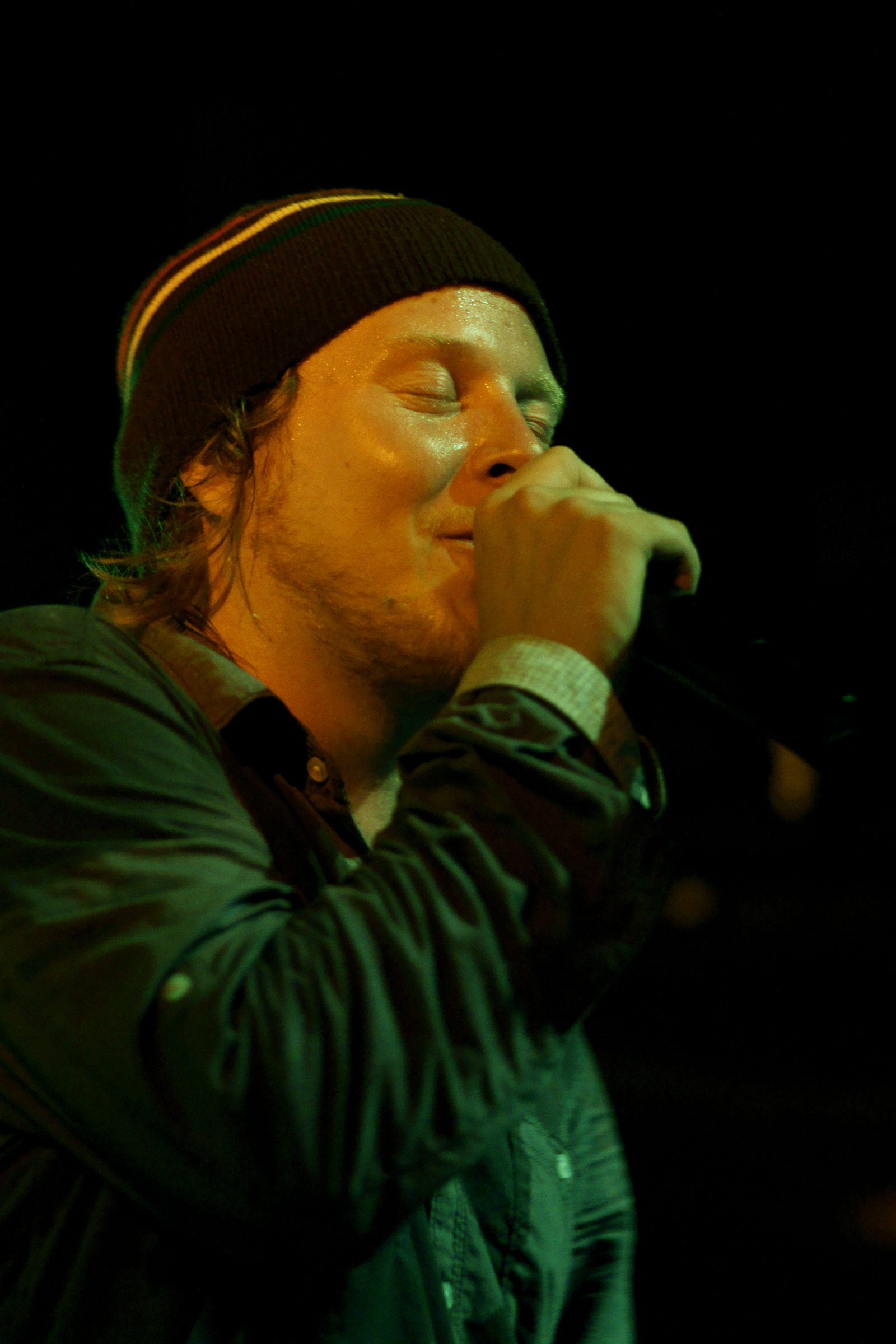
- Raappana performing at Bar Kino, Pori, Finland on 8 July 2010.

Background information
- Born: Janne Pöyhönen
- Origin: Lahti, Finland
- Genres: Reggae
- Labels: Ylivoima

Janne Pöyhönen, better known by his stage name Raappana, is a Finnish reggae artist from Lahti.

== Career ==
Raappana's first studio album Päivä on nuori was released on 3 October 2007. It peaked at number 18 on the Finnish Album Chart. His second studio album Maapallo, released on 1 September 2010, peaked at number one on the same chart. On 22 March 2013, he released his third studio album Tuuliajolla which reached number five on the album chart.

Raappana also appeared as a featured guest on a song "Kran Turismo" by JVG. The song spent 12 weeks at number one on the Finnish Singles Chart.

== Discography ==
=== Albums ===
Year	Album	Peak positions
Year	Album	FIN
2007	Päivä on nuori	18
2010	Maapallo	1
2013	Tuuliajolla	5
2015	Ennen aamunkoittoo	36

Others

- 2010: Ilta on nuori (Remix album)

=== Singles ===
- "Sensimilla/Lintsari Anthem Remix 7"
- "Perhesuhteet"
- "Paha on sanoa

Year	Single	Peak positions	Album
Year	Single	FIN	Album
2012	"Kauas pois"	14	Tuuliajolla
2016	"Chilii" (featuring Sini Yasemin)	7	

featured in

Year	Single	Peak positions	Album
Year	Single	FIN	Album
2012	"Kran Turismo" (JVG featuring Raappana)	1	JVG's album jvg.fi
