= Valvomo =

Finnish band

Valvomo is a band from Helsinki, Finland. They became widely known in the summer of 2006 with their song "Mikä kesä". "Mikä kesä" was one of the most airplayed songs in Finnish summer 2006. Valvomo's debut album Heitä Ensimmäinen Kivi, was released in August 2006.

== Members ==
Alex "setä" Keskitalo (vocals)

Teiska (Guitar)

Ville (Drums)

Markiisi (Bass)

== Discography ==
Albums Heitä ensimmäinen kivi (2006)

Toivo (2008)

Singles Ovi ois (2006)

Mikä kesä? (2006)

Ensimmäinen kaiken ottaa (promo, 2006)

Tiistai (promo, 2007)

Soo soo (promo, 2008)

Matkaan (promo, 2008)
