= List of number-one singles of 1989 (Finland) =

This is the list of the number-one singles of the Finnish Singles Chart in 1989.

== Chart history ==
Issue date	Artist	Title
Week 1	Stone	"Back to the Stone Age"
Week 2	Stone	"Back to the Stone Age"
Week 3	Stone	"Back to the Stone Age"
Week 4	Stone	"Back to the Stone Age"
Week 5	Stone	"Back to the Stone Age"
Week 6	Sabrina	"Like a Yo-Yo"
Week 7	Sabrina	"Like a Yo-Yo"
Week 8	Sabrina	"Like a Yo-Yo"
Week 9	Edelweiss	"Bring Me Edelweiss"
Week 10	Marc Almond featuring Gene Pitney	"Something's Gotten Hold of My Heart"
Week 11	Roy Orbison	"You Got It"
Week 12	Marc Almond featuring Gene Pitney	"Something’s Gotten Hold of My Heart"
Week 13	Madonna	"Like a Prayer"
Week 14	Madonna	"Like a Prayer"
Week 15	Madonna	"Like a Prayer"
Week 16	Madonna	"Like a Prayer"
Week 17	Madonna	"Like a Prayer"
Week 18	Madonna	"Like a Prayer"
Week 19	Roxette	"The Look"
Week 20	Roxette	"The Look"
Week 21	Roxette	"The Look"
Week 22	Kim Lönnholm	"Minä olen muistanut"
Week 23	Kim Lönnholm	"Minä olen muistanut"
Week 24	Kim Lönnholm	"Minä olen muistanut"
Week 25	Kim Lönnholm	"Minä olen muistanut"
Week 26	Kim Lönnholm	"Minä olen muistanut"
Week 27	Kim Lönnholm	"Minä olen muistanut"
Week 28	Kim Lönnholm	"Minä olen muistanut"
Week 29	Kim Lönnholm	"Minä olen muistanut"
Week 30	Kim Lönnholm	"Minä olen muistanut"
Week 31	Kim Lönnholm	"Minä olen muistanut"
Week 32	Kim Lönnholm	"Minä olen muistanut"
Week 33	Kim Lönnholm	"Minä olen muistanut"
Week 34	London Boys	"London Nights"
Week 35	London Boys	"London Nights"
Week 36	London Boys	"London Nights"
Week 37	Bat & Ryyd	"Ehtaa tavaraa (80-luvun tykki)"
Week 38	Bat & Ryyd	"Ehtaa tavaraa (80-luvun tykki)"
Week 39	Bat & Ryyd	"Ehtaa tavaraa (80-luvun tykki)"
Week 40	Bat & Ryyd	"Ehtaa tavaraa (80-luvun tykki)"
Week 41	Bat & Ryyd	"Ehtaa tavaraa (80-luvun tykki)"
Week 42	Bat & Ryyd	"Ehtaa tavaraa (80-luvun tykki)"
Week 43	Kaoma	"Lambada"
Week 44	Kaoma	"Lambada"
Week 45	Kaoma	"Lambada"
Week 46	Kaoma	"Lambada"
Week 47	Kaoma	"Lambada"
Week 48	Kaoma	"Lambada"
Week 49	Phil Collins	"Another Day in Paradise"
Week 50	Technotronic	"Pump Up the Jam"
Week 51	Technotronic	"Pump Up the Jam"
Week 52	Technotronic	"Pump Up the Jam"
