= Pikku G =

Finnish rapper (born 1987)

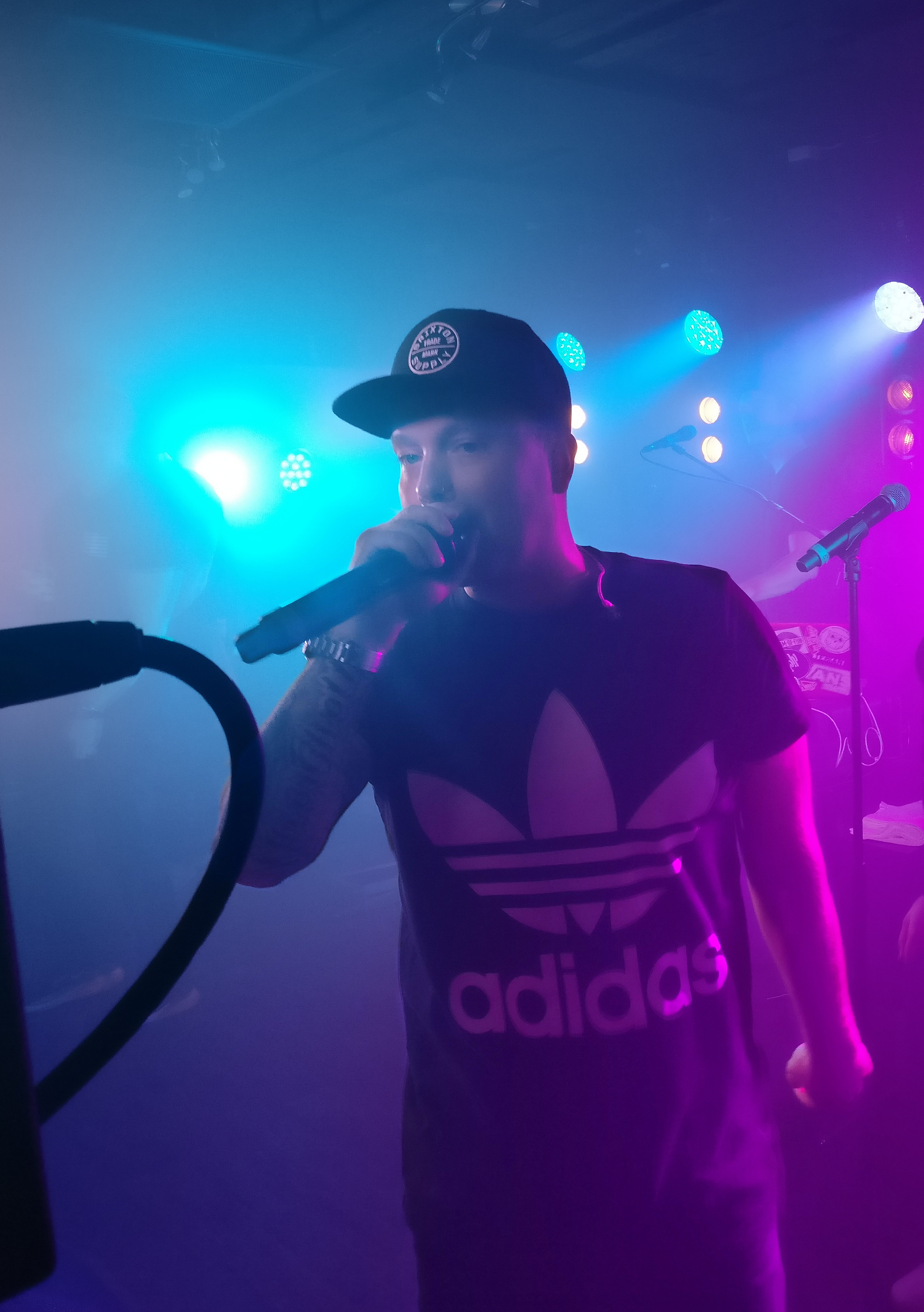
Pikku G in 2018

Henri Samuel Vähäkainu (born 9 March 1987), better known by his stage name Pikku G and briefly Gee, is a Finnish rapper and a start-up founder from Nurmijärvi. He became famous in 2003 under his stage name "Pikku G" which refers to his small size (= "pikku") and to "Genetic", his old breakdance name. Henri Vähäkainu's first hip-hop album, Räjähdysvaara, was the best-selling recording in the country in 2003.

The second album, Suora lähetys, released the following year, also sold platinum (more than 20,000). In 2008, he released two singles under the artist name Gee, but since 2017, after a break of years, he is touring again under the name Pikku G. In 2019, he released an album called Kilometrit.

Vähäkainu has produced other hip-hop artists with the Coach Beats producer group.

Since 2011 he is leading an IT technology company called AppGyver with his partner.

== Musical career ==
At the age of 15, in 2002, Henri Vähäkainu won the Rockin ’Da North demo competition, organized by the then Radiomafia, now YleX (Finnish Broadcasting Company) after which he entered the studio with the Rockin da North group.

The book Pikku G by journalist Carla Ahonius was published in 2004, the same year Pikku G was chosen as the most positive Finn of the year.

Henri Vähäkainu produces other artists in his producer group Coach Beats. The group was formed in 2005. Since that it has produced songs for Finnish rap groups and artists such as Kapasiteettiyksikkö and Travis Bicle.

In May 2008, Vähäkainu announced a comeback in the music market under the artist name Gee. On 29 March 2017 Vähäkainu returned to the stage at a student event in Turku, under the name Pikku G. Inspired by it, he was also performing at three summer festivals. In the summer of 2017, Pikku G signed a new record deal with Warner Music Finland. He released a new song in "Solmussa" on 1 December 2017, featuring fresh singer Behm.

== Personal life and society ==
According to his LinkedIn profile Henri Vähäkainu graduated from the Heltech Audiovisual Degree Program at the Helsinki School of Technology in 2008. His studies included animation and graphic design, among other things.

After graduating, Vähäkainu gained work experience in the audiovisual field in Finland, after which he moved to the United States for six months to produce music for local artists.

He ran for a place in the Finnish Parliament in the 2007 elections from the list of Finnish Centre party, but was not elected. He supported Finnish prime minister Matti Vanhanen in 2006 Finnish presidential election. Since then he has been independent and has not been politically active.

In September 2009, Vähäkainu was convicted of aggravated driving under the influence. He received a suspended sentence of 45 days and was day-fined. Vähäkainu was investigated due to his alleged involvement of arranging a meeting between a cocaine dealer and potential customers in October 2009, while still on probation. A text message sent by him to the dealer was presented as an evidence in court. He denied any such involvement. On 30 March 2010 Vähäkainu was convicted of distributing ten grams of cocaine and sentenced to pay 80 day-fines.

In 2011, Vähäkainu became a start-up founder and a partner at the technology company AppGyver. This full turn in life brought by entrepreneurship has inspired him also to social responsibility projects. He has organized local events at his former school in Nurmijärvi and given lectures in schools about entrepreneurship, among other things. Vähäkainu was also participating in a charity recording by 150 musicians and raising funds for the Red Cross.

Vähäkainu is from a Pentecostal family.

Henri Vähäkainu was nominated as a candidate for the most positive phenomenon in Nurmijärvi in 2020.

== Start-up career ==
After graduating in audio visual studies in 2008, Henri Vähäkainu worked for two agencies in the audiovisual area but decided to move to the U.S. to produce music.

After returning to Finland, he started a business with a colleague, Marko Lehtimäki. Their first company developed mobile applications, e.g. for artists and athletes. However, the company did not take off. There were no rapidly scalable solutions for mobile application development, making customization of individual applications laborious and unprofitable.

This setback was, however, a start for the next business. Two colleagues, Marko Lehtimäki and Antti Hannula, launched AppGyver Oy. According to his LinkedIn profile, Henri Vähäkainu joined the company in May 2011 and started to build its success. He is the Chief Operating Officer (COO) of the company.

AppGyver develops digital tools, ready-made blocks for creating business-enhancing mobile applications. AppGyver is known for its innovativeness and therefore, the American online publication TechCrunch, among others, has included AppGyver in the start-ups to be followed regularly.

AppGyver's offices are located in Helsinki and San Francisco. In 2019, the company had a turnover of EUR 1.2 million and 14 employees.

In 2019, AppGyver was selected for the Deloitte Finland Technology Fast 50 list. The program lists the 50 fastest growing technology companies in Finland.

== Discography ==
=== Albums ===
- Räjähdysvaara (2003) (4 × platinum) - 121,204 sales
- Suora lähetys (2004) (platinum) - 36,050 sales
- Kilometrit (2019)

=== Singles ===
- "Shala La La" (2003)
- "Romeo ja Julia" (2003)
- "Me ollaan nuoriso" (2003)
- "Kylki kyljessä" (2004)
- "Valta lapsille" (2004)
- "Stara" (2004)
- "Mr. Coolness" (featuring Roni) (2008)
- "Mestari on takas" (2008)
- "Solmussa" (featuring Behm) (2017)
- "Paratiisiin" (featuring Ilta) (2018)
