= Ripsipiirakka =

Finnish punk rock band

- Origin: Finland
- Genres: Punk rock
- Years active: 1998–2005
- Labels: Mercury Records
- Past members: Jukka Tanskanen (vocals, guitar), Olli Salonen (guitar, backing vocals), Hannu Kiviluoto (bass), Mika Enrold (drums)

Ripsipiirakka was a Finnish punk rock band, known for its vulgar lyrics. The most popular songs are Sanni and a cover version from Pekka Ruuska's Rafaelin enkeli. Ripsipiirakka has inspired other cover bands.

== Members ==
- Jukka (born 9 October 1983), Vocals and Guitar
- Hannu (born 28 February 1983), Bass
- Mika (born 19 June 1985), Drums
- Olli (born 5 May 1983), Vocals and Guitar

== Discography ==
=== Albums ===
1. Punkstars (31 January 2003)
2. Teille vai meille (22 January 2004)
3. The Ripsipiirakka Show (27 April 2005)

=== EP's ===
- Ota Mut (24 September 2003)

=== Singles ===
- Uudestaan
- Kolmistaan (15 November 2002)
