= Martti Vainaa & Sallitut aineet =

Finnish pop group

Martti Vainaa & Sallitut aineet is a Finnish pop-group that was formed in 2001. It was started as a trio, but in 2005 it had five members. In beginning of the carrier the band made covers, but made own lyrics to them and some adjustments. In its actual format, the group started to make own songs. In 2005 the band made success with its song "Pelimies" (Player) and reached the first place at the Finnish single list during the summer of 2005. The song became a summer hit in Finland in 2005. The song was originally made as a supporter song for the Floorball team Happee and has since appeared in several videos involving Janne Pesonen.

In 2026, the band announced that it would return to the stage for a 25th‑anniversary tour featuring the original lineup.

== Members ==
- Max Poster / Kimmo Rantamäki (song, guitar)
- Dan Suker (guitar, background singer)
- Wolf Gustav (basses, background singer)
- Dick Burner (keyboard, background singer)
- Lazy Diamond / Mikko Kekäläinen (drums, background singer)

== Discography ==
- Pakko piikittää (demo, 2002)
- Pelimies / Toyotan takana (single, 6 July 2005)
- Playboy-Hanna (radio-/promosingle, 19 October 2005)
- Onnellinen nyt (album, 2 November 2005)
- Playboy-Hanna / Pelimies 2006 Dance Remix (single, 11 January 2006)
- Toinen nainen / Älä anna rakkaallesi turpaan (single, May 2007)
