= Jukka Poika =

Finnish reggae musician (born 1980)

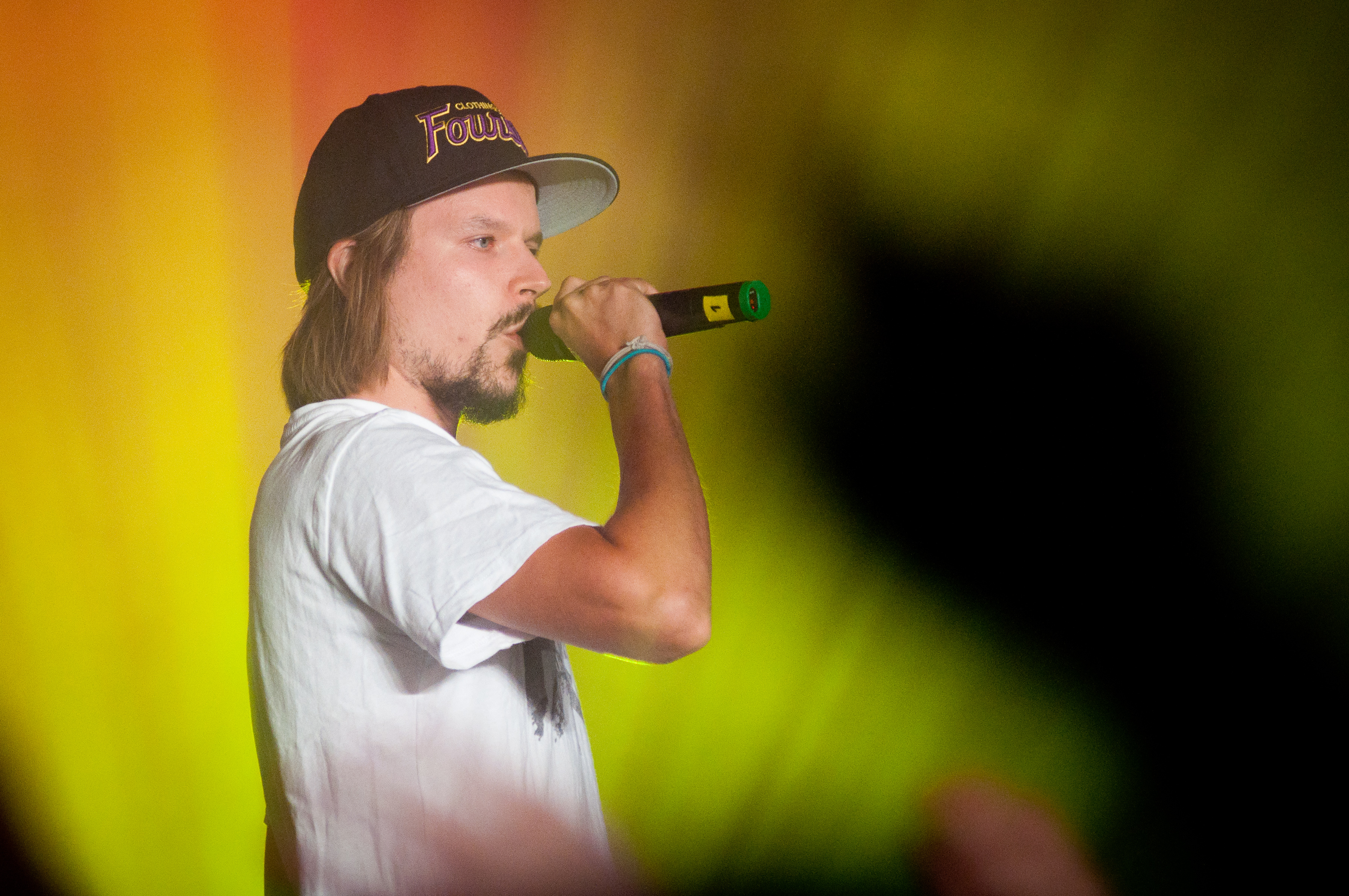
- Jukka Poika in August 2011

Background information
- Born: Jukka Rousu; 19 July 1980 (age 46); Haukipudas
- Origin: Raseborg, Finland
- Genre: Reggae
- Label: KHY Suomen Musiikki Oy

Jukka Rousu (born 19 July 1980), better known by his stage name Jukka Poika, is a Finnish reggae artist.

== Discography ==
=== Albums ===
Title	Details	Peak chart position
Title	Details	FIN
Äänipää	Released: 2007; Label: Suomen Musiikki Oy; Format: CD, digital download	7
Laulajan testamentti	Released: 25 August 2008; Label: Suomen Musiikki Oy; Format: CD, digital download	25
Kylmästä lämpimään	Released: 7 June 2010; Label: Suomen Musiikki Oy; Format: CD, digital download, LP	2
Yhdestä puusta	Released: 14 March 2012; Label: Suomen Musiikki Oy; Format: CD, digital download, LP	1
Kokoelma	Released: 4 October 2013; Label: KHY Suomen Musiikki Oy / Warner Music; Format: CD, digital download	6
Elämäntyyli	Released: 24 April 2015; Label: KHY Suomen Musiikki Oy & Jukka Poika Musiikki Oy; Format: CD, digital download	8

=== Singles ===
Year	Title	Peak position	Album
Year	Title	FIN	Album
2004	"Ei kilpailuu"	–	–
2008	"Matalaenergiamies"	–	Äänipää
2010	"Mielihyvää"	10	Kylmästä lämpimään
2010	"Ikirouta"	–	Kylmästä lämpimään
2011	"Kylmästä lämpimään"	–	Kylmästä lämpimään
2011	"Silkkii"	1	Yhdestä puusta
2012	"Älä tyri nyt"	1	Yhdestä puusta
2012	"Siideripissis"	–	Yhdestä puusta
2012	"Potentiaalii"	–	Yhdestä puusta
2013	"Laineet"	–	Kokoelma
2014	"Brand New ihanuus"	–	Elämäntyyli
2014	"Crazybailaaja"	–	Elämäntyyli
2015	"Isot laivat"	–	Elämäntyyli
2025	"Londinu"	33	Non-album singles
2026	"Stand Back"	36	Non-album singles
2026	"Savurenkaat" (with Ibe)	35	Non-album singles
