= Antero Mertaranta =

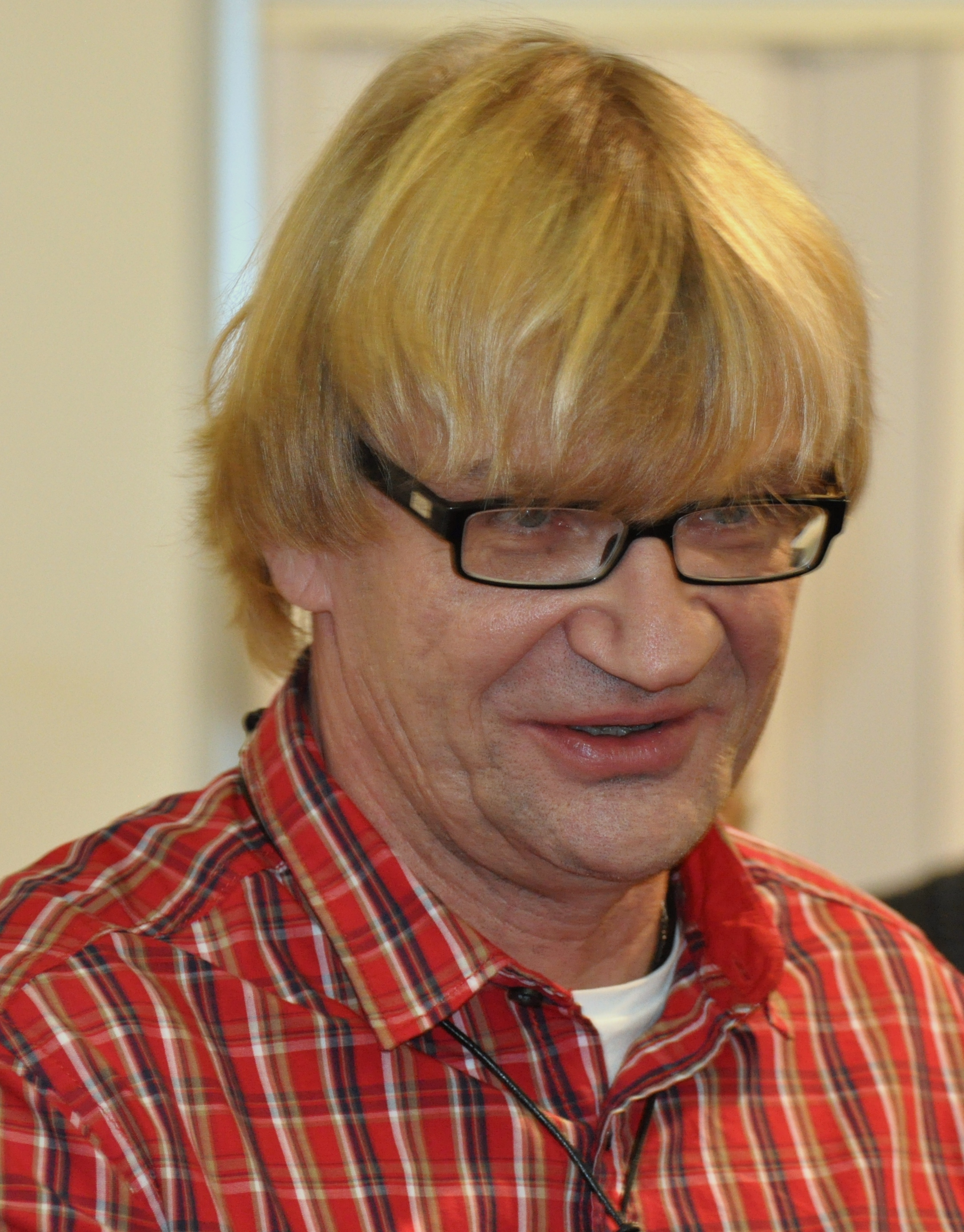
- Antero Mertaranta in 2011.
- Born: Lauri Antero Johannes Mertaranta; 17 January 1956 (age 69); Hyvinkää, Finland
- Other names: Mertsi, Anza
- Occupation(s): Broadcaster, musician

Lauri Antero Johannes Mertaranta (born 17 January 1956 in Hyvinkää, Finland) is a prominent Finnish sportscaster and TV personality and former elementary school teacher.

Antero Mertaranta is best known for his energetic announcing in IIHF World Championships ice hockey games, especially when Finland's team is playing. He has announced for every world championship game Finland's team has played since 1995. Besides ice hockey, Mertaranta has also been announcing football, athletics and Finnish baseball. Mertaranta himself played Finnish baseball in his youth.

In 2001 Mertaranta began hosting a sports quiz show named "Se on siinä", named after one of his most famous catchphrases: Se on siinä! (That's it! / That was it! / There it is!).

Before his sports reporter career Mertaranta worked as a music teacher and fireman. He plays drums in a band called Anza Mertaranta Allstars.^{[fi]} The band planned for an album release in 2005 but is yet to release its debut album.

Mertaranta ended his career of announcing the IIHF World Championships in 2025, but continues to announce Liiga games on MTV Urheilu.

== Highlights ==
- Announced the Finnish broadcast of FIFA World Cup 1994 final
- Announced the Finnish broadcast of FIFA World Cup 1998 final
- Has announced the Finnish broadcast of IIHF Ice Hockey World Championships finals from 1995 and counting in Yle.
- Has announced the Finnish broadcast of IIHF Ice Hockey World Championships finals from 2011 and counting.
- Has announced the Finnish broadcast of IIHF Ice Hockey World Championships finals from 2019 and counting in C More Sport and MTV3.
- Has recorded two smash hit records. Ihanaa Leijonat, Ihanaa (with A-Tyyppi) in 1999 and Pedon Ulvontaa in 2003.

== Discography ==
=== Albums ===
- 2004: Nopea rakastumaan (album by Anza Mertaranta Allstars)
- 2009: Jytää, poppia ja rautalankaa (album by Anza Mertaranta Allstars)

=== Singles ===
- 1999: "Ihanaa Leijonat, Ihanaa!"
- 2010: "Sinistä ja vihreää" (single by Anza Mertaranta Allstars)
- 2011: "Taivas varjele!" (single by Finnish Hockey Mafia feat. Antero Mertaranta) Video on YouTube
- 2019: "Löikö Mörkö sisään?" (single by DJ ILG feat. Antero Mertaranta) Video on YouTube
