= Tehosekoitin =

Finnish rock band

- Origin: Lahti, Finland
- Genres: Finnish rock punk Pop punk
- Years active: 1991–2004
- Labels: Levy-Yhtiö (Finland)
- Members: Otto Grundström; Hannu ”Hanski” Kilkki; Matti Mikkola; Tero Sundell; Juha Kuoppala

Tehosekoitin was a Finnish rock band formed in 1991. The band made mainly traditional rock 'n roll, but also incorporated jazz, blues and ballads.

== History ==
Tehosekoitin released their first three singles on vinyl, playing Finnish-style punk. After these recordings, Tehosekoitin changed their style to more traditional rock and made their first album Rock'n'roll (1994). They gained a nationwide profile in Finland in 1997 with their single "C'mon baby yeah", and went on to release several more singles.

The band translated their lyrics into English and toured Europe and the United Kingdom under the new name Screamin' Stukas, though the tour was not very successful. In 2002 they also released an album in English called A lotta rhythm, under the same name.

The CD single "Lupaan" (2004) became the last Tehosekoitin recording published, and the band played their last gig in August 2004. A reunion tour was announced for 2009. Singer Otto Grundström featured as lead vocalist on the single "Rakkaus repii meidät kappaleiksi" By the Finnish punk rock group Pää Kii in 2012. Another reunion was announced in 2019.

== Members ==
1991–1992

- Janne ”Jansku” Kuusela, vocals
- Henry "Henkka" Hagert, drums
- Hannu ”Hanski” Kilkki, bass
- Matti Mikkola, guitar

1992–1999

- Otto Grundström, vocals
- Ari ”Arska” Tiainen, guitar
- Hannu ”Hanski” Kilkki, bass
- Matti Mikkola, drums

1999–2001

- Otto Grundström, vocals
- Ari ”Arska” Tiainen, guitar
- Hannu ”Hanski” Kilkki, bass
- Matti Mikkola, guitara
- Tero Sundell, drums

2001–2004

- Otto Grundström, vocals
- Hannu ”Hanski” Kilkki, bass
- Matti Mikkola, guitar
- Tero Sundell, drums
- Juha Kuoppala, keyboard

== Discography ==
=== Albums ===
- 1994 Rock'n Roll
- 1997 Köyhät syntiset
- 1998 Varoittava esimerkki
- 1999 Freak Out
- 2000 Rock 'n' Roll Monster Movie Show
- 2001 Rakkauden gangsterit
- 2002 Golden Greats
- 2002 A Lotta Rhythm — International sales title: Screamin' Stukas
- 2009 Kaikki nuoret tyypit

=== Singles & EPs ===
- 1992 Greatest Hits II
- 1993 ... Ja valtakunnassa kaikki hyvin!!!?
- 1994 Yö ulkona
- 1995 T12VM
- 1996 Se johtuu geeneistä '96 (demo)
- 1996 Kadonneet pojat
- 1997 C'mon Baby Yeah
- 1997 Syntynyt köyhänä
- 1997 Hyvä karma
- 1998 Pillitä, Elli, pillitä
- 1998 Pakko päästä pois
- 1999 Asfaltti polttaa (demo)
- 1999 Keskiyön tanssi/Laura
- 1999 Valonkantaja
- 2000 Kaikki nuoret tyypit
- 2000 Pyydä tähdet taivaalta
- 2001 Maailma on sun (demo)
- 2001 Kaukaisimmalle rannalle
- 2001 Kaikki on mahdollista
- 2004 Lupaan

=== DVD ===
- 2002 Vauhdissa - Live-DVD
