= Official Finnish Charts =

Finnish music chart

The Official Finnish Charts (Finnish: Suomen virallinen lista; Swedish: Finlands officiella lista) are national record charts in Finland compiled and published by Musiikkituottajat – IFPI Finland. The name Suomen virallinen lista/Finlands officiella lista (lit. "the Official Finnish Chart"), which is singular in both Finnish and Swedish, is used generically to refer to both the albums and the singles chart, and the context (albums or songs) reveals which chart is meant.

== History ==
The first charts were published in 1951. In January 1991, the Yle radio station Radiomafia started to compile the first weekly chart in Finland called Radiomafian lista, which was broadcast on the radio every Sunday. Prior to that, all singles and album charts in Finland had been either monthly or biweekly published sales charts. Radiomafian lista became the official Finnish charts in January 1994 when they began a partnership with Suomen Ääni- ja kuvatallennetuottajat (ÄKT) (now known as Musiikkituottajat – IFPI Finland), the umbrella organization of recording producers active in Finland. Simultaneously, they began to publish the first weekly published singles chart based on sales in Finland, as well as a chart for studio and compilation albums. This move effectively killed the competition from the other chart compilers and by 1995, the Official Finnish Charts were the only sales charts published in Finland.

== Charts ==
Presently the following weekly charts are composed and published by Musiikkituottajat, according to sales and streaming:

- Albums (Top 50) (Suomen virallinen albumilista, the Official Finnish Albums Chart)
- Singles (Top 50) (Suomen virallinen singlelista, the Official Finnish Singles Chart)
- Mid-priced albums (Top 10)
- Music DVDs (Top 10)

In addition, Musiikkituottajat owns and publishes a digital chart which tracks digital sales of songs and is compiled by the Official Charts Company. In November 2013, Musiikkituottajat began to publish the Official Finnish Airplay Chart:

- Official Finnish Download Chart (Top 30) (Suomen virallinen latauslista)
- Official Finnish Airplay Chart (Top 100) (Suomen virallinen radiosoittolista)

== Lists of number-ones ==
- List of number-one singles (Finland) — the tables include the Singles Chart (top 20), the Download Chart (top 30) and the Airplay Chart (top 100)
- List of number-one albums (Finland)

== See also ==
- List of best-selling albums in Finland
- List of best-selling singles in Finland
- List of best-selling music artists in Finland
