= List of number-one albums of 2008 (Finland) =

This is the complete list of (physical) number-one albums sold in Finland in 2008 according to Finland's Official List composed by Suomen Ääni- ja kuvatallennetuottajat ÄKT (since late August 2010, known as Musiikkituottajat – IFPI Finland).

== Chart history ==
Issue date	Album	Artist(s)	Reference(s)
Week 1	Virsiä	Samuli Edelmann	
Week 2	Virsiä	Samuli Edelmann	
Week 3	Dark Passion Play	Nightwish	
Week 4	Dark Passion Play	Nightwish	
Week 5	Tuhannen riemua	Lauri Tähkä & Elonkerjuu	
Week 6	Dark Passion Play	Nightwish	
Week 7	Sata vuotta	Herra Ylppö & Ihmiset	
Week 8	Raja	Stam1na	
Week 9	Raja	Stam1na	
Week 10	Blanco Spirituals	Ismo Alanko Teholla	
Week 11	Blanco Spirituals	Ismo Alanko Teholla	
Week 12	Blanco Spirituals	Ismo Alanko Teholla	
Week 13	Myrskyntuoja	Teräsbetoni	
Week 14	Revolution Roulette	Poets of the Fall	
Week 15	Kuka teki minusta tän naisen	Jippu	
Week 16	Blooddrunk	Children of Bodom	
Week 17	Blooddrunk	Children of Bodom	
Week 18	Hard Candy	Madonna	
Week 19	Hard Candy	Madonna	
Week 20	Magic Recoveries	Disco Ensemble	
Week 21	Love Remains the Same	Von Hertzen Brothers	
Week 22	Love Remains the Same	Von Hertzen Brothers	
Week 23	Love Remains the Same	Von Hertzen Brothers	
Week 24	Watershed	Opeth	
Week 25	Becoming	Ari Koivunen	
Week 26	Viva la Vida or Death and All His Friends	Coldplay	
Week 27	Viva la Vida or Death and All His Friends	Coldplay	
Week 28	Viva la Vida or Death and All His Friends	Coldplay	
Week 29	Viva la Vida or Death and All His Friends	Coldplay	
Week 30	Viva la Vida or Death and All His Friends	Coldplay	
Week 31	Mamma Mia! The Movie Soundtrack	(The Mamma Mia! cast)	
Week 32	Mamma Mia! The Movie Soundtrack	(The Mamma Mia! cast)	
Week 33	Mamma Mia! The Movie Soundtrack	(The Mamma Mia! cast)	
Week 34	Sotakoira	Kotiteollisuus	
Week 35	Sotakoira	Kotiteollisuus	
Week 36	All Hope Is Gone	Slipknot	
Week 37	Guitar Gangsters & Cadillac Blood	Volbeat	
Week 38	Death Magnetic	Metallica	
Week 39	Death Magnetic	Metallica	
Week 40	Black Roses	The Rasmus	
Week 41	Superpallo	Maija Vilkkumaa	
Week 42	Superpallo	Maija Vilkkumaa	
Week 43	Black Ice	AC/DC	
Week 44	Black Ice	AC/DC	
Week 45	Kasari	Vesa-Matti Loiri	
Week 46	Kasari	Vesa-Matti Loiri	
Week 47	Kasari	Vesa-Matti Loiri	
Week 48	Chinese Democracy	Guns N' Roses	
Week 49	Chinese Democracy	Guns N' Roses	
Week 50	Now	Anna Abreu	
Week 51	Now	Anna Abreu	
Week 52	Kasari	Vesa-Matti Loiri	

== See also ==
- List of number-one singles of 2008 (Finland)
