= List of number-one singles of 2008 (Finland) =

This is the complete list of (physical and digital) number-one singles sold in Finland in 2008 according to the Official Finnish Charts. The list on the left side of the box (Suomen virallinen singlelista, "the Official Finnish Singles Chart") represents both physical and digital track sales and the one on the right side (Suomen virallinen latauslista, "the Official Finnish Download Chart") represents sales of digital tracks.

== Chart history ==
Official Finnish Singles Chart				Official Finnish Download Chart			
Issue date	Song	Artist(s)	Ref	Issue date	Song	Artist(s)	Ref
Week 1 (December 31, 2007)	"Lasten liikennelaulu"	various artists		Week 1	N/A	N/A	N/A
Week 2 (January 7, 2008)	"Dead Inside"	Widescreen Mode		Week 2	"Dead Inside"	Widescreen Mode	
Week 3 (January 14)	"Dead Inside"	Widescreen Mode		Week 3	"Dead Inside"	Widescreen Mode	
Week 4 (January 21)	"Mun koti ei oo täällä"	Chisu		Week 4	"Mun koti ei oo täällä"	Chisu	
Week 5 (January 28)	"Dead Inside"	Widescreen Mode		Week 5	"Dead Inside"	Widescreen Mode	
Week 6 (February 4)	"Mun koti ei oo täällä"	Chisu		Week 6	"Mun koti ei oo täällä"	Chisu	
Week 7 (February 11)	"Mun koti ei oo täällä"	Chisu		Week 7	"Mun koti ei oo täällä"	Chisu	
Week 8 (February 18)	"Mun koti ei oo täällä"	Chisu		Week 8	"Mun koti ei oo täällä"	Chisu	
Week 9 (February 25)	"Of Sacrifice, Loss and Reward"	Kiuas		Week 9	"Mun koti ei oo täällä"	Chisu	
Week 10 (March 3)	"Blooddrunk"	Children of Bodom		Week 10	"Mun koti ei oo täällä"	Chisu	
Week 11 (March 10)	"Mun koti ei oo täällä"	Chisu		Week 11	"Mun koti ei oo täällä"	Chisu	
Week 12 (March 17)	"Mun koti ei oo täällä"	Chisu		Week 12	"Mun koti ei oo täällä"	Chisu	
Week 13 (March 24)	"Mun koti ei oo täällä"	Chisu		Week 13	"Mun koti ei oo täällä"	Chisu	
Week 14 (March 31)	"4 Minutes"	Madonna (feat. Justin; Timberlake and Timbaland)		Week 14	"4 Minutes"	Madonna (feat. Justin; Timberlake and Timbaland)	
Week 15 (April 7)	"4 Minutes"	Madonna (feat. Justin; Timberlake and Timbaland)		Week 15	"4 Minutes"	Madonna (feat. Justin; Timberlake and Timbaland)	
Week 16 (April 14)	"4 Minutes"	Madonna (feat. Justin; Timberlake and Timbaland)		Week 16	"4 Minutes"	Madonna (feat. Justin; Timberlake and Timbaland)	
Week 17 (April 21)	"4 Minutes"	Madonna (feat. Justin; Timberlake and Timbaland)		Week 17	"4 Minutes"	Madonna (feat. Justin; Timberlake and Timbaland)	
Week 18 (April 28)	"4 Minutes"	Madonna (feat. Justin; Timberlake and Timbaland)		Week 18	"4 Minutes"	Madonna (feat. Justin; Timberlake and Timbaland)	
Week 19 (May 5)	"4 Minutes"	Madonna (feat. Justin; Timberlake and Timbaland)		Week 19	"4 Minutes"	Madonna (feat. Justin; Timberlake and Timbaland)	
Week 20 (May 12)	"4 Minutes"	Madonna (feat. Justin; Timberlake and Timbaland)		Week 20	"4 Minutes"	Madonna (feat. Justin; Timberlake and Timbaland)	
Week 21 (May 19)	"4 Minutes"	Madonna (feat. Justin; Timberlake and Timbaland)		Week 21	"4 Minutes"	Madonna (feat. Justin; Timberlake and Timbaland)	
Week 22 (May 26)	"The Islander"	Nightwish		Week 22	"Missä miehet ratsastaa"	Teräsbetoni	
Week 23 (June 2)	"Back Again"	Waldo's People		Week 23	"Back Again"	Waldo's People	
Week 24 (June 9)	"Summer Wine"	Ville Valo & Natalia Avelon		Week 24	"Summer Wine"	Ville Valo & Natalia Avelon	
Week 25 (June 16)	"Kesä-EP"	Apulanta		Week 25	"Liekeissä"	Cheek	
Week 26 (June 23)	"Kesä-EP"	Apulanta		Week 26	"Liekeissä"	Cheek	
Week 27 (June 30)	"Kesä-EP"	Apulanta		Week 27	"Liekeissä"	Cheek	
Week 28 (July 7)	"Liekeissä"	Cheek		Week 28	"Liekeissä"	Cheek	
Week 29 (July 14)	"Liekeissä"	Cheek		Week 29	"Liekeissä"	Cheek	
Week 30 (July 21)	"Liekeissä"	Cheek		Week 30	"Liekeissä"	Cheek	
Week 31 (July 28)	"Kesä-EP"	Apulanta		Week 31	"Liekeissä"	Cheek	
Week 32 (August 4)	"Kesä-EP"	Apulanta		Week 32	"Liekeissä"	Cheek	
Week 33 (August 11)	"Kesä-EP"	Apulanta		Week 33	"Liekeissä"	Cheek	
Week 34 (August 18)	"Vinegar"	Anna Abreu		Week 34	"Vinegar"	Anna Abreu	
Week 35 (August 25)	"The Day That Never Comes"	Metallica		Week 35	"The Day That Never Comes"	Metallica	
Week 36 (September 1)	"Vinegar"	Anna Abreu		Week 36	"The Day That Never Comes"	Metallica	
Week 37 (September 8)	"Bite It Like a Bulldog"	Lordi		Week 37	"Disturbia"	Rihanna	
Week 38 (September 15)	"Livin' in a World Without You"	The Rasmus		Week 38	"Livin' in a World Without You"	The Rasmus	
Week 39 (September 22)	"Plague of Butterflies (EP)"	Swallow the Sun		Week 39	"Livin' in a World Without You"	The Rasmus	
Week 40 (September 29)	"Livin' in a World Without You"	The Rasmus		Week 40	"Livin' in a World Without You"	The Rasmus	
Week 41 (October 6)	"Livin' in a World Without You"	The Rasmus		Week 41	"Livin' in a World Without You"	The Rasmus	
Week 42 (October 13)	"Vinegar"	Anna Abreu		Week 42	"Livin' in a World Without You"	The Rasmus	
Week 43 (October 20)	"Unihiekkaa"	various artists		Week 43	"So What"	Pink	
Week 44 (October 27)	"Vauriot"	Apulanta		Week 44	"Heartbeat of the City"	Kendi	
Week 45 (November 3)	"Dead by X-Mas"	Big Daddy & Rockin' Combo		Week 45	"Heartbeat of the City"	Kendi	
Week 46 (November 10)	"Another Way to Die"	Jack White & Alicia Keys		Week 46	"Another Way to Die"	Jack White & Alicia Keys	
Week 47 (November 17)	"Kuka mä oon"	Oliver		Week 47	"Another Way to Die"	Jack White & Alicia Keys	
Week 48 (November 24)	"Vanguard of the New World"	Kinetik Control		Week 48	"Vanguard of the New World"	Kinetik Control	
Week 49 (December 1)	"Womanizer"	Britney Spears		Week 49	"Vanguard of the New World"	Kinetik Control	
Week 50 (December 8)	"Sex on Fire"	Kings of Leon		Week 50	"Sex on Fire"	Kings of Leon	
Week 51 (December 15)	"Insomnia"	Koop Arponen		Week 51	"Insomnia"	Koop Arponen	
Week 52 (December 22)	"Insomnia"	Koop Arponen		Week 52	"Insomnia"	Koop Arponen	

== See also ==
- List of number-one albums of 2008 (Finland)
