= Nine Lives =

Nine Lives may refer to the common myth that cats have nine lives.

Nine Lives or 9 Lives may also refer to:

== Arts, entertainment, and media ==
=== Films ===
- Nine Lives (1957 film), or Ni Liv, a Norwegian film
- Nine Lives (2002 film), a horror film
- Unstoppable (2004 film), an American action film also released under the title Nine Lives
- Nine Lives (2005 film), an American drama film
- Nine Lives (2016 film), a French comedy film

=== Literature ===
- "Nine Lives" (novelette), 1969 science fiction novelette by Ursula K. Le Guin
- Nine Lives, 1959 autobiography of the Battle of Britain pilot Alan Christopher Deere
- Batman: Nine Lives, a 2002 graphic novel
- Garfield: His 9 Lives, a 1984 collection of illustrated short stories
- Nine Lives: In Search of the Sacred in Modern India, a 2009 travel book by William Dalrymple
- The 9 Lives (manga), an Original English-language manga

=== Music ===
==== Albums ====
- 9 Lives (AZ album), 2001
- 9 Lives (Kat DeLuna album), 2007
- 9 Lives (Pandora album), 2003
- 9 Lives (Koe Wetzel album), 2024
- Nine Lives (Aerosmith album), 1997
- Nine Lives (Deuce album), 2012
- Nine Lives (Goldfinger album), 2026
- Nine Lives (Last Autumn's Dream album), 2012
- Nine Lives (Robert Plant album), 2006
- Nine Lives (Bonnie Raitt album), 1986
- Nine Lives (REO Speedwagon album), 1979
- Nine Lives (Steve Winwood album), 2008
- Nine Lives (Von Hertzen Brothers album), 2013

==== Songs ====
- "9 Lives" (Alexandra Stan song), 2017
- "9 Lives", by Aṣa from Lucid
- "9 Lives", by Machine Gun Kelly from Mainstream Sellout
- "9 Lives", by Self from Gizmodgery
- "Nine Lives" (Aerosmith song), 1997
- "Nine Lives", by Black Grape from Pop Voodoo
- "Nine Lives", by Def Leppard from Songs from the Sparkle Lounge
- "Nine Lives", by Edguy from Tinnitus Sanctus
- "Nine Lives", by Primal Fear from Primal Fear
- "Nine Lives", by Warmen from Band of Brothers

=== Television ===
- "9 Lives", an episode of television series Psych
- "Nine Lives", an episode of the first season of Kung Fu

=== Video games ===
- 9 Lives (video game), a 1990 platform game

== Other uses ==
- 9 lives, a line of Eveready batteries
- 9Lives, a pet food brand
- 9lives (real name Maxwell Warren Jardine), a musician from New Zealand

== See also ==
- 9 (disambiguation)
