= Petri Walli =

Finnish musician (1969–1995)

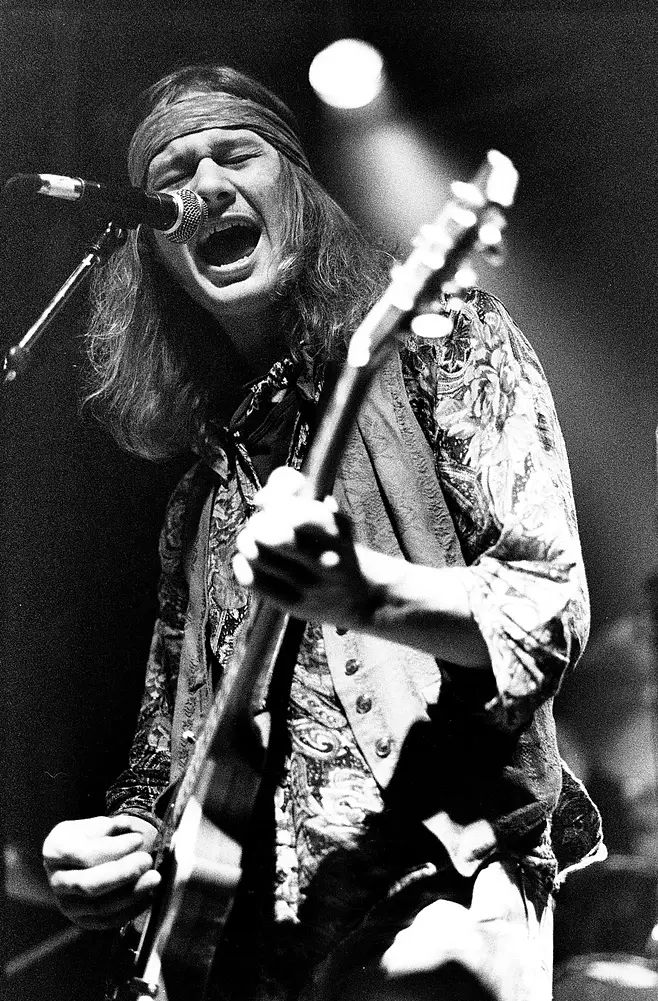
- Petri Walli in September 1990

Background information
- Born: Petri Ilari Walli; February 25, 1969
- Died: June 28, 1995 (aged 26) Töölö, Helsinki
- Genres: progressive rock; psychedelic rock; acid rock
- Instruments: Guitar, singing
- Years active: 1987–1994
- Formerly of: Kingston Wall

Petri Ilari Walli (February 25, 1969 – June 28, 1995) was the founder, vocalist, guitar-player, songwriter and producer of the Finnish psychedelic rock-band Kingston Wall.

Petri was born in Finland. He had a brother, Aki Walli, and a half-brother, Hasse Walli, who is a Finnish guitarist.

Petri (aka Pete) founded the band called Kingston Wall in 1987. Petri's co-musicians in Kingston Wall were Jukka Jylli (bass) and Sami Kuoppamäki (drums). Sometimes they had guest musicians performing on their albums and live shows, such as Sakari Kukko (saxophone) and Kimmo Kajasto (synth). Drummers Petteri Ståhl and Timo "Tinde" Joutsimäki played drums in Kingston Wall before Kuoppamäki joined the group. They came out with three albums in 1992, 1993 and 1994, and broke up in December the same year as the last album was released. The break-up was Walli's idea.

After the break-up Petri travelled to Goa, India, where he had been multiple times before with his friend Ior Bock.

Walli died in Töölö, Helsinki the following summer, at the age of 26. He was buried in the Hietaniemi Cemetery.
