= Operation Martin =

1943 Allied clandestine operation in Norway

Coordinates: 69°03′43″N 18°30′17″E

- Part of World War II
Date	March 1943
Location	Rebbenesøya, Norway
Result	German victory

Belligerents
Norway	Germany

Strength
12 Company Linge	R56 and Gestapo

Casualties and losses
11	1

Operation Martin (Red) was an Allied clandestine operation of the Second World War to destroy a German airfield control tower at Bardufoss and organise secret military resistance groups in Tromsø in German-occupied Norway in 1943. The operation consisted of twelve Norwegians of the Company Linge group, who had been trained by the British in Scotland and returned to Norway in March 1943.

== Mission ==
=== Team members ===
- Løytnant Sigurd Eskeland
- Fenrik Jan Baalsrud
- Fenrik Per Blindheim
- Kaptein Sverre Odd Kverhellen
- Erik Reichelt
- Harald Peter Ratvik
- Bjørn Normann Bolstad
- Gabriel Salvesen
- Magnus Johan Kvalvik
- Frithjof M. Haugland
- Sjur Ludvigsen Trovaag
- Alfred A. Vik
- Cyrill J. Banzon

=== Failure ===
This operation was compromised when the Norwegian operatives, seeking a trusted local resistance contact, accidentally met an unaligned civilian shopkeeper with the same name as their contact, who reported them to the Germans. The escape attempt failed when the group's vessel MK Brattholm I was detected and attacked by the German Räumboot R56. To escape, MK Brattholm I was scuttled by its Norwegian crew by detonating 7.9 long tons; 8.8 short tons (8 t) explosives with a time delay fuse. The crew fled in a small boat, which was promptly sunk by the Germans. Eleven Norwegian soldiers from the Company Linge died; one was shot at the site, ten were captured, interrogated and tortured by the Gestapo and then executed in Tromsø. Jan Baalsrud managed to escape from Rebbenesøya to neutral Sweden; his three-month escape was made through Lyngen and Manndalen with the help of local villagers, during which he amputated nine toes to avoid the spread of gangrene.

== Executions ==
The executions of the prisoners in Tromsø were investigated after the war under the case of Toftefjordsaken (The Toftefjord case). The Gestapo officers who tortured and executed eight of the MK "Brattholm I" crew were ordered in the late summer of 1945 to dig up the bodies from the mass grave at Grønnåsen Skytebane, first with spades, then by hand, so as to not damage the bodies. They also had to wash the bodies before placing them in coffins. The prosecution after the war became difficult as the main target, Kurt Stage, was not in Norwegian custody. Stage was executed in 1947 in Slovenia for war crimes there; no criminal proceedings were brought against the four others who were charged in the case.

== In popular culture ==
Two films have been made based on Operation Martin: the 1957 Ni Liv (Nine Lives) and the 2017 Den 12. Mann (The 12th Man). The latter, directed by the Norwegian director Harald Zwart, stars Thomas Gullestad as Jan Baalsrud and Jonathan Rhys Meyers as Kurt Stage.
