= Zook (band) =

Finnish rock band

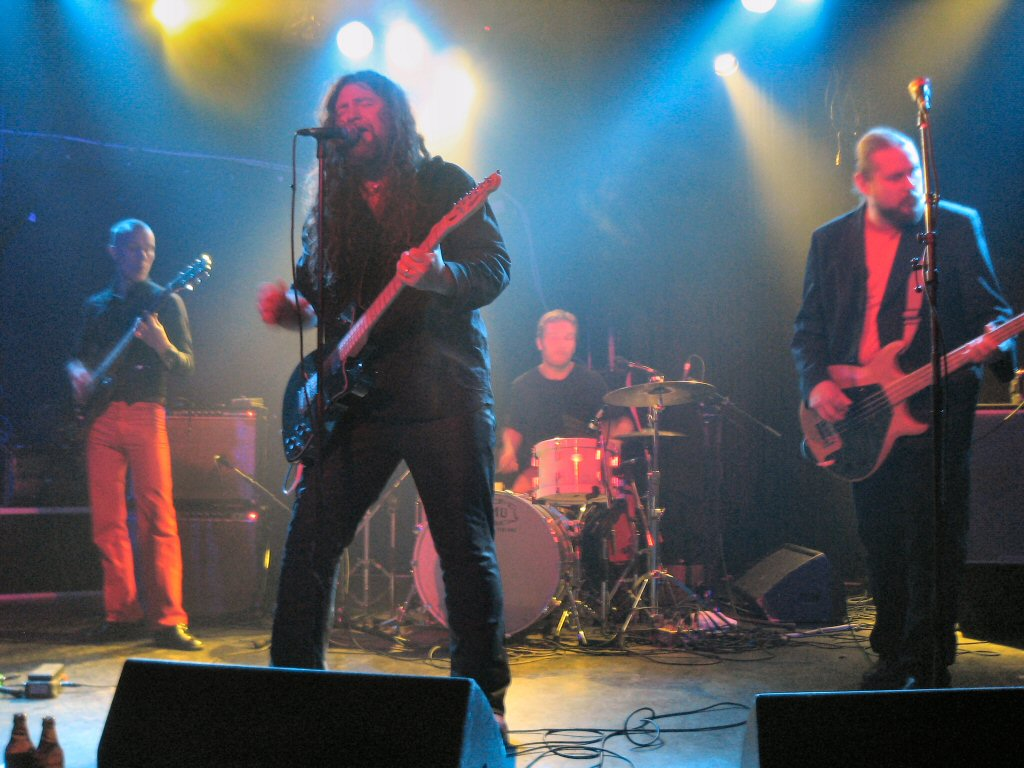
- l-r: Rocka Merilahti, Bryn Jones, Sami Kuoppamäki, Jukka Jylli

Background information
- Origin: Helsinki, Finland
- Genres: Blues rock, rock
- Years active: 2003–present
- Label: Kuru Records
- Members: Bryn Jones; Rocka Merilahti; Jukka Jylli; Sami Kuoppamäki
- Website: https://web.archive.org/web/20080204225144/http://www.zookzone.net/

Zook is a Finnish rock band based in Helsinki, Finland. Their debut album, Root Canal Recovery, was released in January 2006. It charted at number 27 on the Finnish Top-40 charts.

Two of the band's members, Jukka Jylli and Sami Kuoppamäki were formerly members in the well-known progressive/psychedelic rock band Kingston Wall. Rocka Merilahti has played in Hurriganes' Remu Aaltonen's and Hanoi Rocks' Michael Monroe's solo bands. Zook toured Finland from 2 March to 29 April 2006.

== Discography ==
=== Singles ===
- Chemistry (2005)

=== Albums ===
- Root Canal Recovery (2006)
