= Taivas lyö tulta =

Single by Teräsbetoni

from the album Metallitotuus
- Released: February 2, 2005
- Recorded: 2004–2005
- Genre: Power metal
- Length: 3:22
- Label: Warner Music Finland

Teräsbetoni singles chronology
| "Taivas lyö tulta" (2005) | "Orjatar" (2005) |

Music video
- "Taivas lyö tulta" on YouTube

"Taivas lyö tulta" (English: The sky strikes down fire) is the first single by the Finnish power metal band Teräsbetoni, and was released in February 2005. It is perhaps the most well known song by the band, and it rose to the top of the Finnish single list during its release week, followed by much radio play and the band becoming more widely known.

== Track listings ==
| No. | Title | Length |
|---|---|---|
| 1. | "Taivas lyö tulta" (The sky strikes down fire) | 3:22 |
| 2. | "Pyhä maa" (Holy land) | 3:38 |
