= Rebbenesøya =

Island in Norway

Rebbenesøya (Norwegian) Ruobbá (Northern Sami)
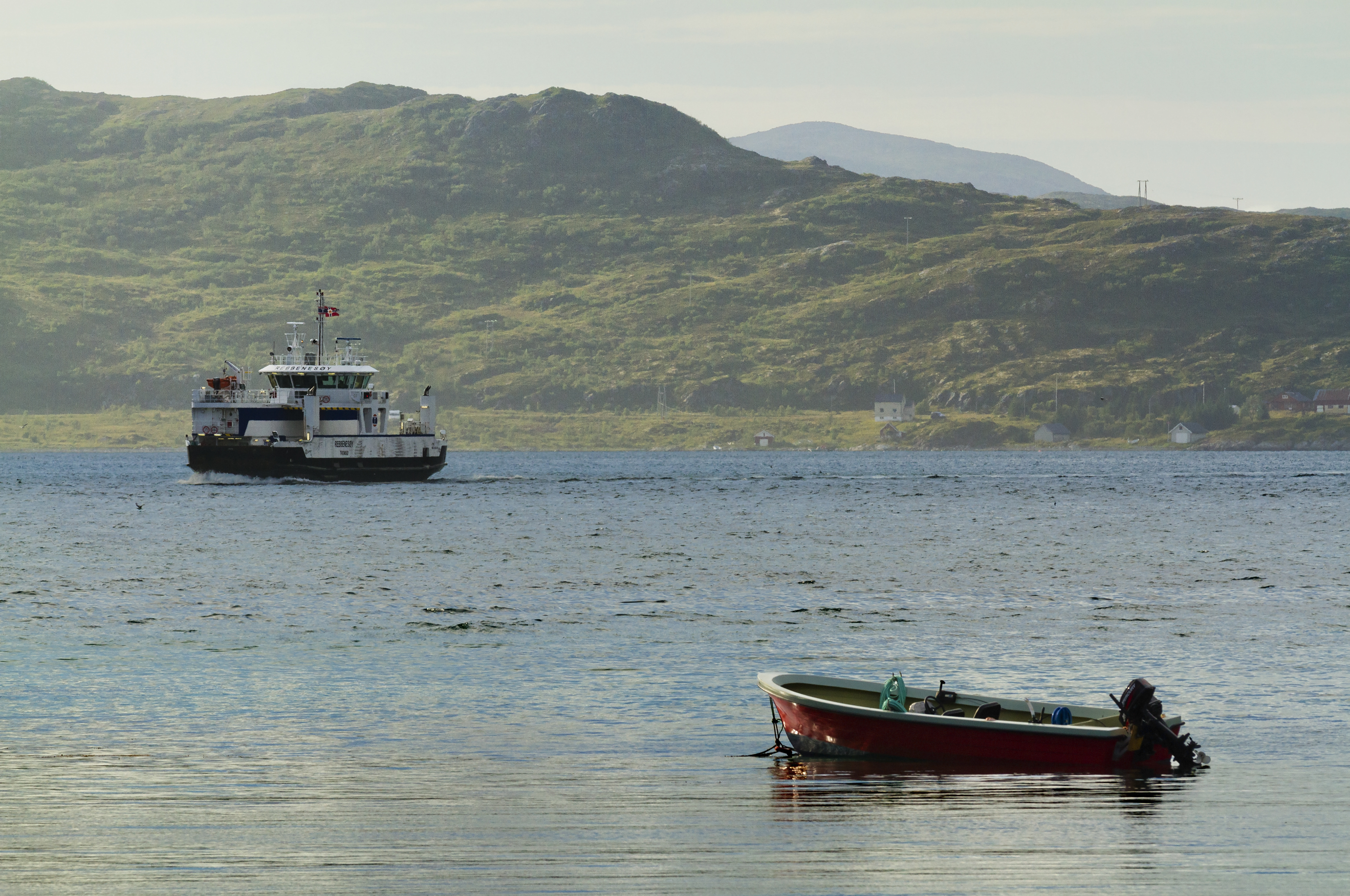
- Rebbenesøy ferry
- Interactive map of Rebbenesøya (Norwegian); Ruobbá (Northern Sami)

Geography
- Location: Troms, Norway
- Coordinates: 70.0523°N 18.7225°E
- Area: 80.6 km^{2} (31.1 sq mi)
- Length: 14 km (8.7 mi)
- Width: 10 km (6 mi)
- Highest elevation: 694 m (2277 ft)
- Highest point: Geittinden

Administration
- Norway
- County: Troms
- Municipality: Karlsøy and Tromsø

Demographics
- Population: 53 (2024)
- Pop. density: 1.7/km^{2} (4.4/sq mi)

Rebbenesøya (Norwegian) or Ruobbá (Northern Sami)) is an island in Troms county, Norway. The southern third of the 80.6-square-kilometre (31.1 sq mi) island is part of Tromsø Municipality while the northern (larger) portion of the island is part of Karlsøy Municipality. There is a regular ferry connection from Bromnes on the eastern end on Rebbenesøya to Mikkelvik on the northwestern end of the neighboring island of Ringvassøya.

On Rebbenesøya, there are many mountains that are suitable for tourists who enjoy the outdoors and hiking. The highest point on the island is Geittinden at a height of 694 metres (2,277 ft). There are also about 20 fishing lakes. The uninhabited island nature reserve of Sørfugløya lies off the north-west coast.

The island's school is in Skogvika; It had six students in the 2012/2013 school year. The island also has a convenience store located in Engvika.

== History ==
Twelve Norwegian commandos from Company Linge were attacked by a German minesweeper in Toftefjord on the island of Rebbenesøya on 30 March 1943. The only man who escaped was Jan Baalsrud. Over a period of three months and enduring harsh conditions, he was aided by patriots in escaping to Sweden. A monument to those killed is located in Toftefjord.

== Representation in other media ==
- Baalsrud's escape is the subject of the book We Die Alone: A WWII Epic of Escape and Endurance (1955) by British author David Howarth. This was adapted as a Norwegian film, called Nine Lives (1957), directed by Arne Skouen. It was nominated for an Oscar in 1958 for best Foreign Language Film.
- The book Jan Baalsrud and Those Who Saved Him (2001), written by Tore Haug and Astrid Karlsen Scott, also recounted his remarkable survival. A Norwegian film based on the book, The 12th Man (2017), was directed by Harald Zwart. It was released on Netflix in 2020.

== See also ==
- List of islands of Norway
