= Love Remains the Same =

Love Remains the Same may refer to:

- "Love Remains the Same" (song), a 2008 song by Gavin Rossdale
- Love Remains the Same (album), an album by the Finnish rock band Von Hertzen Brothers
