= Approach (album) =

Studio album by Von Hertzen Brothers
- Released: 17 May 2006 (Finland)
- Recorded: MD Studios Helsinki, Finland
- Genre: Progressive rock
- Length: 58:00
- Label: Dynasty Recordings
- Producer: von Hertzen Brothers

Von Hertzen Brothers chronology
Experience (2001)	Approach (2006)	Love Remains the Same (2008)

Approach is the Finnish rock band Von Hertzen Brothers's second full-length album. The album was released on 17 May 2006 in Finland and went gold. The first single released from the album was "Let Thy Will Be Done" and the second was "Kiss a Wish".

"Approach" won the Emma award, the Finnish equivalent of the Grammy Award, for Best Rock Album of the year 2006.

== Track listing ==
1. "Disciple Of The Sun" – 8:12
2. "Let Thy Will Be Done" – 4:47
3. "River" – 4:02
4. "Endlessly" – 8:20
5. "In Your Arms" – 5:37
6. "Open Water Stormy Weather" – 4:47
7. "Ocean Of Mercy" – 7:42
8. "Kiss A Wish" – 9:30
9. "After All" – 5:03

== Personnel ==
- Kie von Hertzen - Lead guitars, vocals, etc.
- Mikko von Hertzen - Lead vocals, guitars, etc.
- Jonne von Hertzen - Bass, vocals, etc.
- Sami Kuoppamäki - Drums and Percussion

Guests (in order of appearance)

- Juha Kuoppala - Various keyboards on all Tracks
- Jukka Puurula - Viola and Violin on Track 03
- Antto Melasniemi - Flute on Track 05
- Juho Martikainen - Double Bass on Track 07
- Laura Närhi - Vocals on Track 07
- Sonny Heinilä - Ney Flute on Track 08
- Maikki Liuski - Vocals on Tracks 08, 09
- Tuomas Murtomaa - French horn on Track 09
- Tommi Lindell - Analog Pörinä on Track 09
- Aldur Smith-Diesel, Denis Vinokur and Matti Pyykkö - Photography
- Janne "Toxic Angel" Pitkänen at InferiArt - Artwork and layout

== Trivia ==
- The former Kingston Wall drummer Sami Kuoppamäki played the drums on the album.
- The album was produced by the brothers themselves
