= Myrskyntuoja =

Studio album by Teräsbetoni
- Released: March 19, 2008
- Genre: Power metal, heavy metal
- Length: 52:48
- Label: Warner Music Finland
- Producer: Hiili Hiilesmaa

Teräsbetoni chronology
| Vaadimme metallia (2006) | Myrskyntuoja (2008) | Maailma Tarvitsee Sankareita (2010) |

Myrskyntuoja (English: Stormbringer) is the third studio album by the Finnish heavy metal band Teräsbetoni.

It entered the Finnish Album Chart at number 1.

== Track listing ==
1. Voiman vartijat (4:26) ('Guardians of Power')
2. Painajainen (4:13) ('Nightmare')
3. Missä miehet ratsastaa (3:55) ('Where the Men Ride')
4. Ukkoshevonen (3:19) ('Thunderhorse')
5. Orjakaleeri (5:24) ('Slave Galley')
6. Paha sanoo (3:56) ('Evil Says')
7. Teräksen taakka (5:27) ('The Burden of Steel')
8. Metallin voima (4:10) ('The Strength of Metal')
9. Kuumilla porteilla (4:24) ('At The Hot Gates')
10. Vihollisille (3:52) ('For Enemies')
11. Huominen tulla jo saa (5:15) ('Tomorrow May Come')
12. Seiso suorassa (4:49) ('Stand Straight')

== Personnel ==
- Jarkko Ahola - lead vocals, bass
- Arto Järvinen - guitar, vocals on "Kuumilla porteilla"
- Jari Kuokkanen - drums
- Viljo Rantanen - guitar
