= Stars Aligned =

Studio album by Von Hertzen Brothers
- Released: 2011 (Finland)
- Genre: Progressive rock
- Length: 55:46
- Label: Universal Music

Von Hertzen Brothers chronology
Love Remains the Same (2008)	Stars Aligned (2011)	Nine Lives (2013)

Stars Aligned is the fourth studio album by the Finnish progressive rock band Von Hertzen Brothers. It was released on 21 March 2011 in Finland and 23 March 2011 in the United Kingdom.

== Track listing ==
All lyrics are written by Von Hertzen Brothers; all music is composed by Von Hertzen Brothers and L.A. Skin.

No.	Title	Length
1.	"Miracle"	4:04
2.	"Gloria"	4:39
3.	"Voices in Our Heads"	6:48
4.	"Angel's Eyes"	4:39
5.	"Down By the Seas"	4:32
6.	"Bring Out the Snakes"	6:49
7.	"Repeat Mode"	6:51
8.	"Always Been Right"	3:57
9.	"I Believe"	8:08
10.	"Freedom Fighter" (Live, bonus)	4:56
Total length:		55:46
