= Jippu =

Finnish singer

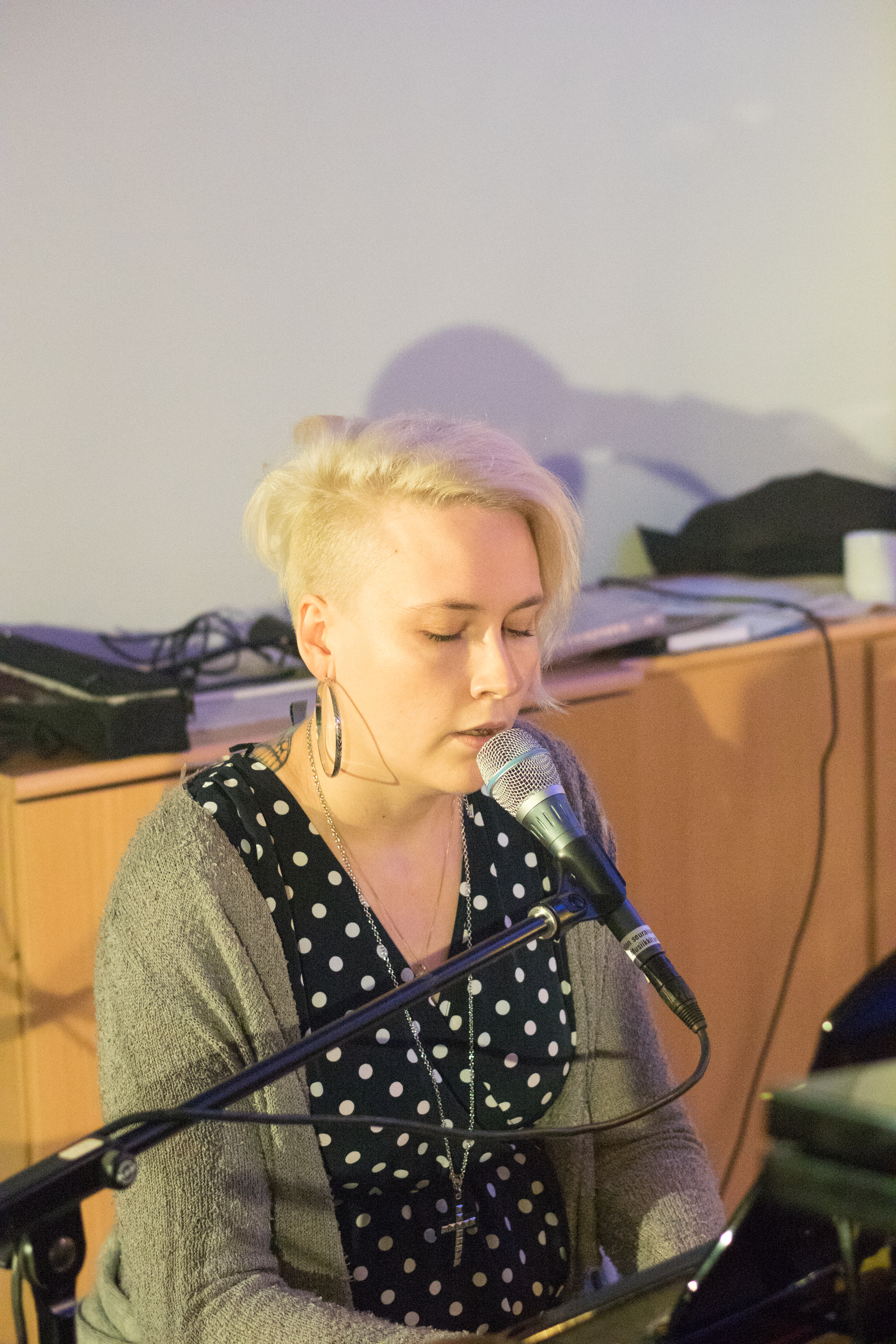

Background information
- Born: Meri-Tuuli Elorinne; September 10, 1985 (age 41)
- Origin: Helsinki, Finland
- Genre: Pop
- Occupations: Singer, songwriter
- Instrument: Vocals
- Years active: 2005–present
- Label: Helsinki Music Company

Meri-Tuuli Elorinne (born September 10, 1985, in Helsinki), better known by her stage name Jippu, is a Finnish pop singer.

Her father, Jorma Elorinne was an operatic tenor. She started singing very early and at the age of 11, was part of The Kids. She released her single "Kii" in 2005 that was used as a theme song for FC Venus, a Finnish romantic comedy film directed by Joona Tena. Based on this, she released her debut album Salaisuuksia, joita yksinäiset huutaa unissaan in September 2006. She won "Best debut album" for her release during Emma-gaala Finnish music awards in 2007. Her follow-up album, Kuka teki minusta tän naisen, went gold, reaching the top of the Finnish Albums Chart.

In 2008, she took part in the selection process to represent Finland in the Eurovision Song Contest 2008 with the song "Kanna minut", but was unsuccessful in her bid as the choice went to Teräsbetoni and their song "Missä miehet ratsastaa"

In late 2009 her collaboration with Samuli Edelmann resulted in a very successful joint album entitled Pimeä onni that reached No. 2 in the Finnish Albums Chart. Her duo single "Jos sä tahdot niin" with Edelmann topped the Finnish singles chart followed by another single with Edelmann, the title track "Pimeä onni" which hit the top 20. She returned in 2012 with her solo album released in April 2012 entitled Väärinpäin lentävät linnut.

== Discography ==
=== Albums ===
Year	Album	Charts	Certification
Year	Album	FIN	Certification
2006	Salaisuuksia, joita yksinäiset huutaa unissaan	11	
2008	Kuka teki minusta tän naisen	1	
2010	Pimeä onni (with Samuli Edelmann)	2	
2012	Väärinpäin lentävät linnut	8	
2014	Rakkauden Joulu	23	
2016	Made in Heaven	—	
2018	Getsemane	—	
2026	Pimeä onni (with Samuli Edelmann)	34	

=== EPs ===
- 2006: Enkelten kaupunki (Sunsilk, Special Edition, 2006)

=== Singles ===
Charting singles

Year	Single	Charts	Certification	Album
Year	Single	FIN	Certification	Album
2009	Jos sä tahdot niin (with Samuli Edelmann)	1		Pimeä onni
2010	"Pimeä onni" (with Samuli Edelmann)	17		Pimeä onni
2026	"Pimeä onni – Sugared" (with Samuli Edelmann)	19		Non-album single

Other solo song releases

- 2004: "Piiloon/Liikaa/Kii"
- 2005: "Kii"
- 2006: "Kukkakaupan kulmalla"
- 2006: "Enkelten kaupunki" (promotional single)
- 2006: "Kaksi kauneinta" (promotional single)
- 2006: "Piiloon" (promotional single)
- 2007: "Vanha kaunis mies" (promotional single)
- 2008: "Kanna minut" (promotional single)
- 2008: "Kuka teki minusta tän naisen" (promotional single)
- 2008: "Tuonelan koivut" (promotional single)
- 2012: "Väärinpäin lentävät linnut"

=== Music videos ===
- Kii
- Enkelten kaupunki (directed by Lauri Nurkse)
- Kuka teki minusta tän naisen (directed by Lauri Nurkse)
- Tuonelan koivut (directed by Tuukka Temonen)
