= Sørfugløya =

Island in Karlsøy, Norway

Coordinates: 70°06′12″N 18°30′11″E

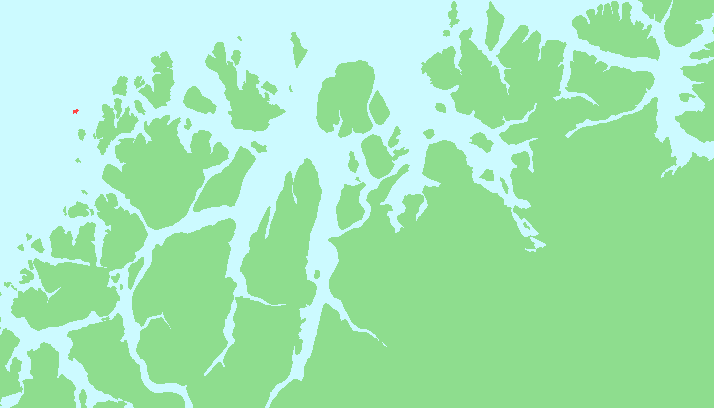
Locator map of Sørfugløya, Troms, Norway

Sørfugløya or Sør-Fugløy is a small (97 ha) uninhabited island and nature reserve in Karlsøy Municipality, Troms county, in Arctic northern Norway. It lies just north-west of the larger inhabited island of Rebbenesøya. It is a steep island with grassy slopes surrounded by boulder scree. It, with its adjacent marine waters, has been designated a 760 ha Important Bird Area (IBA) by BirdLife International because it supports large breeding colonies of Atlantic puffins and razorbills. European storm petrels also breed on the island.
