= Vaadimme metallia =

Studio album by Teräsbetoni
- Released: 14 June 2006
- Genre: Power metal, heavy metal
- Length: 42:01
- Label: Warner Music Finland

Teräsbetoni chronology
Metallitotuus (2005)	Vaadimme metallia (2006)	Myrskyntuoja (2008)

Vaadimme metallia (English: We Demand Metal) is the second album by Finnish heavy metal band Teräsbetoni.

It was gold certified.

== Track listing ==
1. Vaadimme Metallia (3:30) ('We Demand Metal')
2. Viimeinen Tuoppi (3:36) ('Last Pint')
3. Älä Mene Metsään (3:55) ('Don't Go into the Forest')
4. Varmaan Kuolemaan (5:05) ('To a Certain Death')
5. Kuninkaat (4:48) ('Kings')
6. Saalistaja (3:28) ('The Prowler')
7. Paha Silmä (3:42) ('Evil Eye')
8. Sotureille (2:51) ('For Warriors')
9. Kotiinpalaaja (3:36) ('Home Returner')
10. Aika on (3:14) ('It Is Time')
11. Kirotut (4:23) ('The Cursed')
12. Pyhä Maa (3:38) ('The Holy Land')
13. Vihollisen Vuoteessa (3:42) ('In Bed With The Enemy')
14. Kunniansa Ansainneet (2:56) ('Those Who Have Deserved Their Honor')

== Personnel ==
- Jarkko Ahola - lead vocals, bass
- Arto Järvinen - guitar, vocals
- Jari Kuokkanen - drums
- Viljo Rantanen - guitar
