= Maailma tarvitsee sankareita =

Studio album by Teräsbetoni
- Released: 24 November 2010
- Genre: Power metal, heavy metal
- Label: Sakara Records
- Producer: Hiili Hiilesmaa

Teräsbetoni chronology
Myrskyntuoja (2008)	Maailma tarvitsee sankareita (2010)

Maailma tarvitsee sankareita (English: The World Needs Heroes) is the fourth studio album by the Finnish heavy metal band Teräsbetoni.

== Track listing ==
No.	Title	Length
1.	"Myrsky nousee" (The storm rises)	4:26
2.	"Metalliolut" (Metal beer)	3:33
3.	"Maailma tarvitsee sankareita" (The World needs heroes)	4:32
4.	"Jumalten usva" (Mist of the gods)	5:04
5.	"Mies" (Man)	3:32
6.	"Tunnemme sinut" (We know you)	3:09
7.	"Uudestisyntynyt" (Reborn)	4:51
8.	"Thanatos" (Thanatos)	3:59
9.	"Konstantinopoli" (Constantinople)	6:22
10.	"Eteenpäin" (Forward)	3:53
11.	"Gloria" (Gloria)	7:08

== Personnel ==
- Jarkko Ahola - lead vocals, bass
- Arto Järvinen: guitar, vocals
- Viljo Rantanen: guitar
- Jari Kuokkanen: drums
