= Finland in the Eurovision Song Contest 2008 =

- Eurovision Song Contest 2008
- Participating broadcaster: Yleisradio (Yle)
- Country: Finland
- Selection process: Euroviisut 2008
- Selection date: 1 March 2008

Competing entry
- Song: "Missä miehet ratsastaa"
- Artist: Teräsbetoni
- Songwriters: Jarkko Ahola

Placement
- Semi-final result: Qualified (8th, 79 points)
- Final result: 22nd, 35 points

Participation chronology

Finland was represented at the Eurovision Song Contest 2008 with the song "Missä miehet ratsastaa", written by Jarkko Ahola, and performed by the band Teräsbetoni. The Finnish participating broadcaster, Yleisradio (Yle), organised the national final Euroviisut 2008 in order to select its entry for the contest. 12 entries were selected to compete in the national final, which consisted of three semi-finals, a Second Chance round and a final, taking place in February and March 2008. Eight entries ultimately competed in the final on 1 March where votes from the public selected "Missä miehet ratsastaa" performed by Teräsbetoni as the winner.

Finland was drawn to compete in the first semi-final of the Eurovision Song Contest which took place on 20 May 2008. Performing during the show in position 16, "Missä miehet ratsastaa" was announced among the 10 qualifying entries of the first semi-final and therefore qualified to compete in the final on 24 May. It was later revealed that Finland placed eighth out of the 19 participating countries in the semi-final with 79 points. In the final, Finland performed in position 8 and placed twenty-second out of the 25 participating countries, scoring 35 points.

== Background ==
Prior to the 2008 contest, Yleisradio (Yle) had participated in the Eurovision Song Contest representing Finland forty-one times since its first entry in 1961. It has won the contest once in 2006 with the song "Hard Rock Hallelujah" performed by Lordi. In 2007, it automatically qualified to the final where "Leave Me Alone" performed by Hanna Pakarinen placed seventeenth.

As part of its duties as participating broadcaster, Yle organises the selection of its entry in the Eurovision Song Contest and broadcasts the event in the country. The broadcaster confirmed its intentions to participate at the 2008 contest on 2 July 2007. Yle had selected its entries for the contest through national final competitions that have varied in format over the years. Since 1961, a selection show that was often titled Euroviisukarsinta highlighted that the purpose of the program was to select a song for Eurovision. Along with its participation confirmation, the broadcaster also announced that its entry for the 2008 contest would be selected through the Euroviisut selection show.

== Before Eurovision ==
=== Euroviisut 2008 ===
Euroviisut 2008 was the national final organised by Yle to select its entry for the Eurovision Song Contest 2008. The competition consisted of three stages that commenced with the first of three semi-finals on 8 February 2008, followed by a Second Chance round on 1 March 2008 and concluded with a final also on 1 March 2008. The three stages were hosted by Eurovision Song Contest 2007 host Jaana Pelkonen and YleX DJ Mikko Peltola. All shows were broadcast on Yle TV2, via radio on Yle Radio Suomi and online at yle.fi.

==== Format ====
The format of the competition consisted of three stages: three semi-finals, a Second Chance round and a final. Four songs competed in each semi-final and the top two entries from each semi-final directly qualified to the final. The remaining two entries of each semi-final competed in the Second Chance round where an additional two entries qualified to complete the eight-song lineup in the final. The results for all three stages were determined exclusively by a public vote. Public voting included the options of telephone and SMS voting.

==== Competing entries ====
Twelve artists were directly invited by Yle to compete in the national final following consultation with record companies and presented on 15 November 2007. The entries competing in each semi-final were presented in preview programmes on Yle Radio Suomi on 4, 11, and 18 February 2008, respectively.

Artist	Song	Songwriter(s)	Label
Cristal Snow	"Can't Save Me"	Tapio Huuska, Heikki Liimatainen, Jimi Constantine	HMC
Crumbland	"Pleasure"	Antti Pylkkänen, Jonas Genberg, Pexi Parviainen, Teemu Seppälä	Terra Recordings
Hanna Marsh	"Broken Flower"	Hanna Marsh	Sony BMG
Jenna	"Sinua varten"	Ilkka Vainio, Risto Asikainen	Edel Records Finland
Jippu	"Kanna minut"	Meri-Tuuli Elorinne, Markus Koskinen	HMC
Kari Tapio	"Valaise yö"	Ilkka Vainio, Pertti Haverinen	Edel Records Finland
Kristian Meurman	"Jos en sua saa"	Kristian Meurman	Universal Music Finland
Mikael Konttinen	"Milloin"	Kerkko Koskinen, Kyösti Salokorpi	EMI Finland
Movetron	"Cupido"	Jukka Tanttari, Timo Löyvä	Sony BMG
Ninja	"Battlefield of Love"	Susan Nova	Universal Music Finland
Teräsbetoni	"Missä miehet ratsastaa"	Jarkko Ahola	Popyhtiö
Vuokko Hovatta	"Virginia"	Kerkko Koskinen, Anna Viitala	Warner Music Finland

==== Semi-finals ====
The three semi-final shows took place on 8, 15 and 22 February 2008 at the Tohloppi Studios in Tampere. The top two from the four competing entries in each semi-final qualified directly to the final based on the results from the public vote, while the remaining two entries advanced to the Second Chance round.

Semi-final 1 – 8 February 2008
R/O	Artist	Song	Televote	Place	Result
1	Hanna Marsh	"Broken Flower"	—	—	Second Chance
2	Kari Tapio	"Valaise yö"	46.7%	1	Final
3	Movetron	"Cupido"	20.3%	2	Final
4	Crumbland	"Pleasure"	—	—	Second Chance

Semi-final 2 – 15 February 2008
R/O	Artist	Song	Televote	Place	Result
1	Ninja	"Battlefield of Love"	—	—	Second Chance
2	Kristian Meurman	"Jos en sua saa"	26.8%	2	Final
3	Jippu	"Kanna minut"	—	—	Second Chance
4	Mikael Konttinen	"Milloin"	46.1%	1	Final

Semi-final 3 – 22 February 2008
R/O	Artist	Song	Televote	Place	Result
1	Jenna	"Sinua varten"	—	—	Second Chance
2	Cristal Snow	"Can't Save Me"	27.4%	2	Final
3	Vuokko Hovatta	"Virginia"	—	—	Second Chance
4	Teräsbetoni	"Missä miehet ratsastaa"	51.7%	1	Final

==== Second Chance ====
The Second Chance round took place before the final on 1 March 2008 at the Kulttuuritalo in Helsinki where the entries placed third and fourth in the preceding three semi-finals competed. The top two from the six competing entries qualified to the final based on the results of a public vote.

Second Chance – 1 March 2008
R/O	Artist	Song	Result
1	Ninja	"Battlefield of Love"	—N/a
2	Jippu	"Kanna minut"	—N/a
3	Crumbland	"Pleasure"	Final
4	Hanna Marsh	"Broken Flower"	—N/a
5	Vuokko Hovatta	"Virginia"	Final
6	Jenna	"Sinua varten"	—N/a

==== Final ====
The final took place on 1 March 2008 at the Kulttuuritalo in Helsinki where the eight entries that qualified from the preceding three semi-finals and the Second Chance round competed. The winner was selected over two rounds of public televoting. In the first round, the top three from the eight competing entries qualified to the second round, the superfinal. In the superfinal, "Missä miehet ratsastaa" performed by Teräsbetoni was selected as the winner. In addition to the performances of the competing entries, the interval act featured Aikakone and Hanna Pakarinen, who represented Finland in 2007.

Final – 1 March 2008
R/O	Artist	Song	Result
1	Movetron	"Cupido"	—N/a
2	Kristian Meurman	"Jos en sua saa"	—N/a
3	Cristal Snow	"Can't Save Me"	Advanced
4	Mikael Konttinen	"Milloin"	—N/a
5	Teräsbetoni	"Missä miehet ratsastaa"	Advanced
6	Kari Tapio	"Valaise yö"	Advanced
7	Crumbland	"Pleasure"	—N/a
8	Vuokko Hovatta	"Virginia"	—N/a

Superfinal – 1 March 2008
R/O	Artist	Song	Televote	Place
1	Cristal Snow	"Can't Save Me"	26.5%	3
2	Teräsbetoni	"Missä miehet ratsastaa"	38.9%	1
3	Kari Tapio	"Valaise yö"	33.9%	2

== At Eurovision ==
It was announced in September 2007 that the competition's format would be expanded to two semi-finals in 2008. According to the rules, all nations with the exceptions of the host country and the "Big Four" (France, Germany, Spain, and the United Kingdom) are required to qualify from one of two semi-finals in order to compete for the final; the top nine songs from each semi-final as determined by televoting progress to the final, and a tenth was determined by back-up juries. The European Broadcasting Union (EBU) split up the competing countries into six different pots based on voting patterns from previous contests, with countries with favourable voting histories put into the same pot. On 28 January 2008, a special allocation draw was held which placed each country into one of the two semi-finals. Finland was placed into the first semi-final, to be held on 20 May 2008. The running order for the semi-finals was decided through another draw on 17 March 2008 and Finland was set to perform in position 16, following the entry from the Netherlands and before the entry from Romania.

The two semi-finals and the final were televised in Finland on Yle TV2 with commentary in Finnish by Jaana Pelkonen, Mikko Peltola, and Asko Murtomäki. The three shows were also broadcast on Yle FST5 with commentary in Swedish by Thomas Lundin as well as via radio with Finnish commentary by Sanna Pirkkalainen and Jorma Hietamäki on Yle Radio Suomi. Yle appointed Mikko Leppilampi as its spokesperson to announce the Finnish votes during the final.

=== Semi-final ===
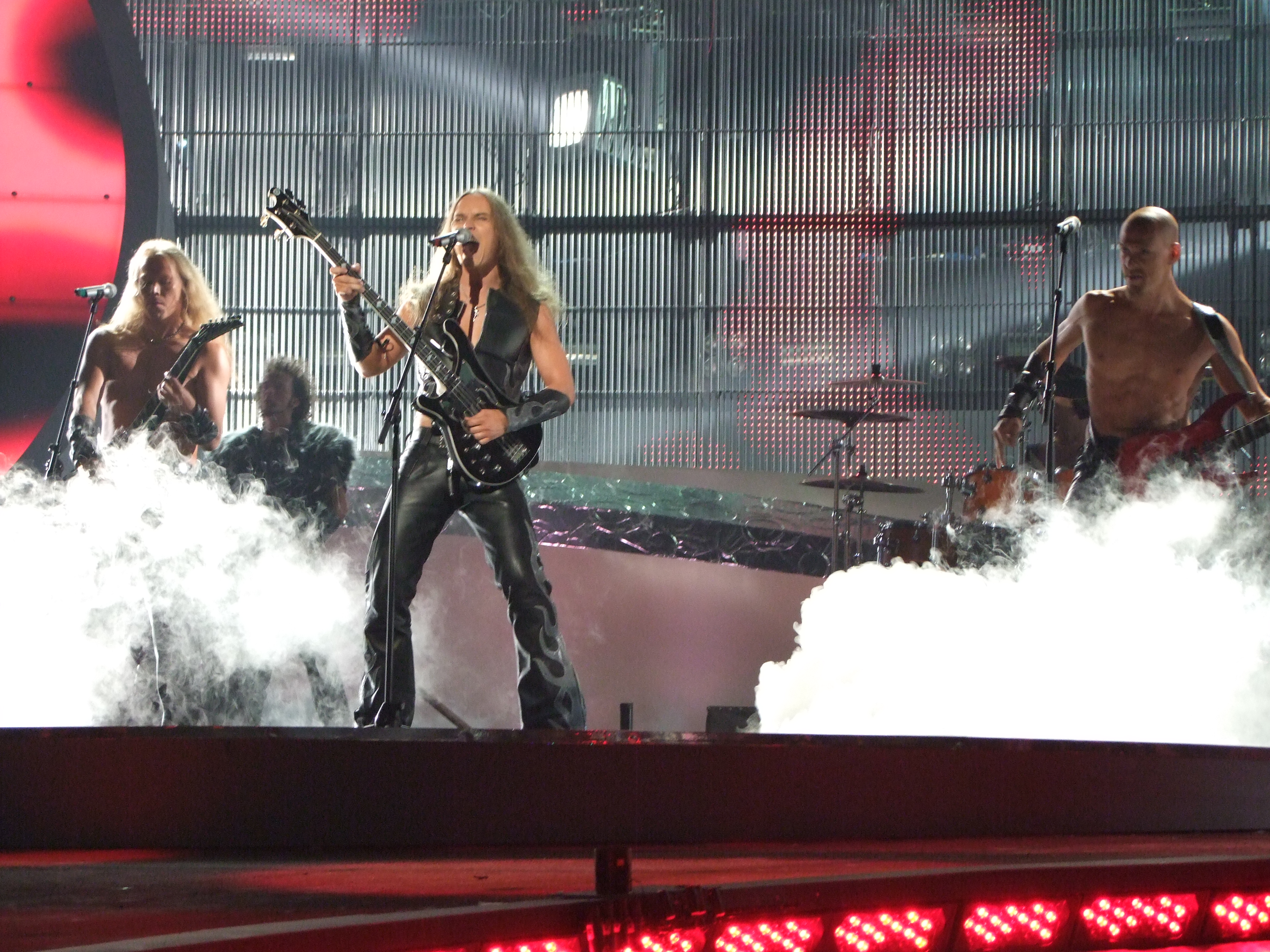
Teräsbetoni during a rehearsal before the first semi-final

Teräsbetoni took part in technical rehearsals on 12 and 16 May, followed by dress rehearsals on 19 and 20 May. The Finnish performance featured the members of Teräsbetoni wearing various leather outfits and performing in a band set-up. The LED screens and stage lighting displayed white and red colours and the performance also featured several effects including smoke, fire and pyrotechnics. Two backing performers also joined Teräsbetoni on stage: Antto Tuomainen and Osku Ketola.

At the end of the show, Finland was announced as having finished in the top 10 and subsequently qualifying for the grand final. It was later revealed that Finland placed eighth in the semi-final, receiving a total of 79 points.

=== Final ===
Shortly after the first semi-final, a winners' press conference was held for the ten qualifying countries. As part of this press conference, the qualifying artists took part in a draw to determine the running order for the final. This draw was done in the order the countries were announced during the semi-final. Finland was drawn to perform in position 8, following the entry from Israel and before the entry from Croatia.

Teräsbetoni once again took part in dress rehearsals on 23 and 24 May before the final. The band performed a repeat of their semi-final performance during the final on 24 May. At the conclusion of the voting, Finland finished in twenty-second place with 35 points.

=== Voting ===
Below is a breakdown of points awarded to Finland and awarded by Finland in the first semi-final and grand final of the contest. The nation awarded its 12 points to Norway in the semi-final and the final of the contest.

==== Points awarded to Finland ====
Points awarded to Finland (Semi-final 1)
Score	Country
12 points	Andorra; Estonia
10 points	
8 points	Moldova
7 points	
6 points	Greece; Ireland; Norway; Spain
5 points	Poland
4 points	Russia; San Marino
3 points	Slovenia
2 points	Belgium; Germany; Montenegro
1 point	Bosnia and Herzegovina

Points awarded to Finland (Final)
Score	Country
12 points	
10 points	Estonia
8 points	
7 points	Iceland; Sweden
6 points	
5 points	
4 points	Andorra; Norway
3 points	
2 points	Poland
1 point	Latvia

==== Points awarded by Finland ====
Points awarded by Finland (Semi-final 1)
Score	Country
12 points	Norway
10 points	Israel
8 points	Bosnia and Herzegovina
7 points	Estonia
6 points	Russia
5 points	Azerbaijan
4 points	Armenia
3 points	Greece
2 points	Ireland
1 point	Romania

Points awarded by Finland (Final)
Score	Country
12 points	Norway
10 points	Russia
8 points	Israel
7 points	Iceland
6 points	Bosnia and Herzegovina
5 points	Sweden
4 points	Turkey
3 points	Ukraine
2 points	France
1 point	Spain
