= Sami Kuoppamäki =

Finnish drummer

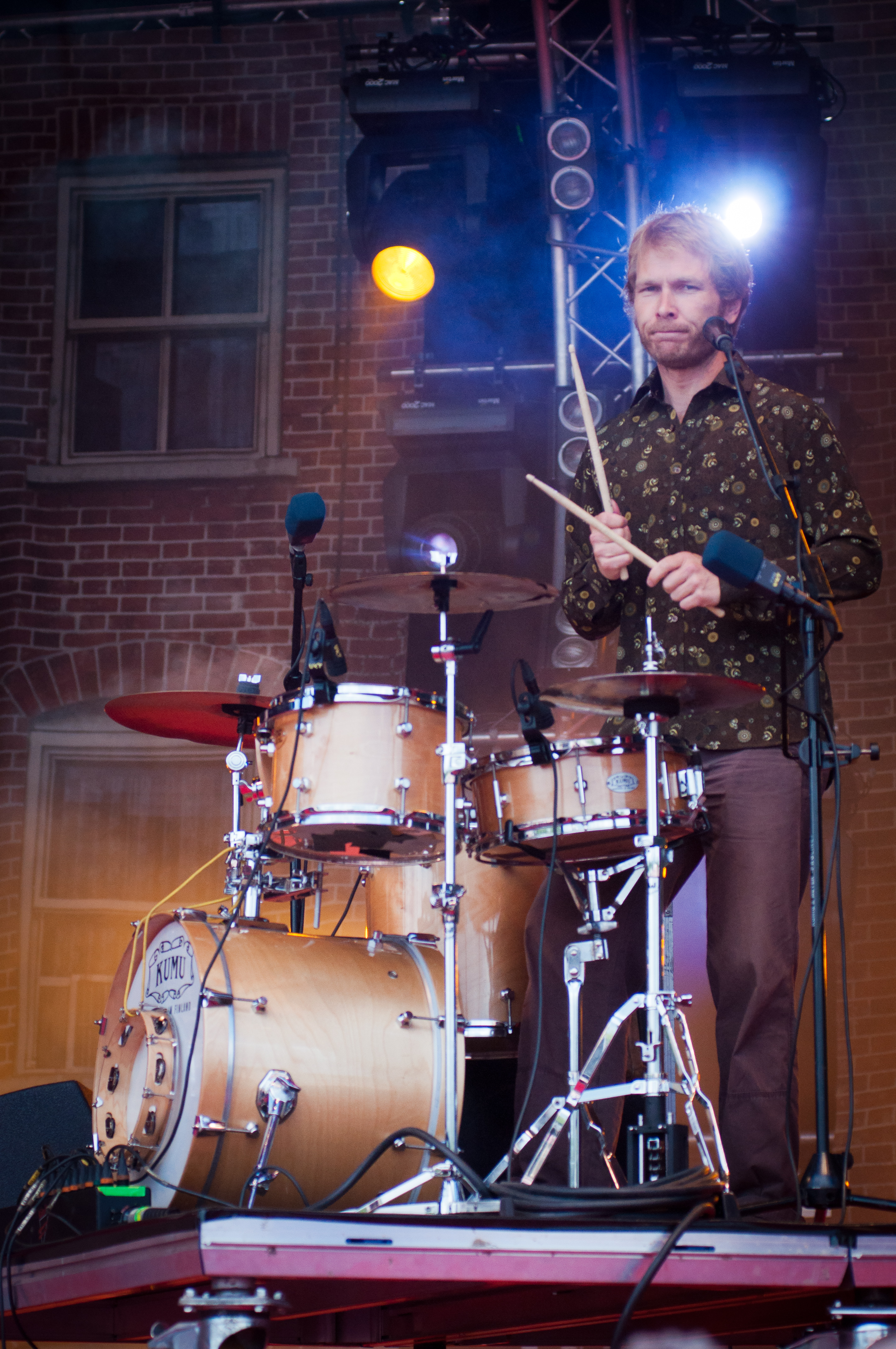
Sami Kuoppamäki playing for Samuli Putro's band at the 2011 Ilosaarirock festival.

Sami Kuoppamäki (born 1971) is a Finnish drummer who has been a very prolific jazz and popular music session musician after the break-up of his early-1990s band, Kingston Wall. He played on the Von Hertzen Brothers album Approach in 2006 before rejoining the ex-Kingston Wall bassist Jukka Jylli in the band Zook. In 2017 he rejoined Von Hertzen Brothers, and as of 2023, is still recording and touring with them.

== Session work ==
In 1994 Kuoppamäki played session drums as a stand-in for the popular power metal band Stratovarius, for the recording of their third studio album, Dreamspace (his contribution can be heard on five of the album's songs). This was due to regular drummer Tuomo Lassila suffering from an arm injury.

In 2000–2001 Kuoppamäki played drums in the house band of the Finnish TV show Hotelli Sointu.

In 2003 he played session drums for Apocalyptica for the album Reflections, although the major credits for the drum recordings are given to Slayer's Dave Lombardo. After his participation, Apocalyptica hired Mikko Sirén as permanent drum player.

In 2006 he played drums for Von Hertzen Brothers for their second album Approach.

In 2007 and 2011 he played drums in the live band of the Finnish Idols TV show's finals.

== Live work ==
Kuoppamäki performed with accordionist Kimmo Pohjonen to rave reviews at the "Meltdown on the South Bank" festival in London in 2005.

== Discography ==
Year	Album	Artist	Credit
1991	Silmänkääntötemppu	Don Huonot	Percussion
1992	I	Kingston Wall	Percussion, Drums
1993	II	Kingston Wall	Percussion, Drums
1994	Dreamspace	Stratovarius	Drums
1994	III Tri-Logy	Kingston Wall	Percussion, Drums
1994	Verta, Pornoa & Propagandaa	Don Huonot	Conga
1997	File Under: Finnish Ambient ...	RinneRadio ...	Percussion
2000	14 Diamonds: Best of Stratovarius	Stratovarius	Drums
2002	Finnish Jazz 2002	Various Artists	Drums
2003	Dreamspace [Bonus Track]	Stratovarius	Drums
2003	Reflections	Apocalyptica	Percussion, Drums
2003	Seemann	Apocalyptica	Percussion
2005	Reflections [Bonus Tracks]	Apocalyptica	Percussion
2005	Open Eyes	Metropol	Drums
2006	Amplified: A Decade of ...	Apocalyptica	Drums
2006	Seasons of Life [Bonus Track]	Janita	Drums
2006	Approach	Von Hertzen Brothers	Percussion, Drums
2007	HumppAvanti	Avanti	Percussion, Drums
2007	Ipanapa, Vol. 1	Various Artists	Voices
2009	Pitkä Kirja II	Various Artists	Drums
2017	War is Over	Von Hertzen Brothers	Drums
2022	Red Alert in the Blue Forest	Von Hertzen Brothers	Drums, Percussion, Arrangements
2024	In Murmuration	Von Hertzen Brothers	Drums, Percussion, Arrangements
