= The 12th Man (film) =

2017 film directed by Harald Zwart

- Directed by: Harald Zwart
- Written by: Petter Skavlan (credited as Alex Boe)
- Based on: Jan Baalsrud and Those Who Saved Him by: Tore Haug; Astrid Karlsen Scott
- Produced by: Veslemøy Ruud Zwart; Espen Horn; Aage Aaberge
- Starring: Thomas Gullestad; Jonathan Rhys Meyers
- Cinematography: Geir Hartly Andreassen
- Edited by: Jens Christian Fodstad
- Music by: Christophe Beck
- Production companies: Nordisk Film Production AS; Zwart Arbeid
- Distributed by: IFC Midnight
- Release date: 25 December 2017
- Running time: 135 minutes
- Country: Norway
- Languages: Norwegian; German; English
- Budget: 64 million Norwegian krone
- Box office: $9.6 million (Norway)

The 12th Man (Norwegian: Den 12. mann) is a 2017 Norwegian historical drama film directed by Harald Zwart, starring Thomas Gullestad as Jan Baalsrud, who escapes from occupying Nazi Germans on the island of Rebbenesøya, via the Lyngen Fjord and Manndalen, to neutral Sweden in the spring of 1943. The film, based on historical events of Operation Martin and the escape of Jan Baalsrud, adapted from the book Jan Baalsrud and Those Who Saved Him (2001) by Tore Haug and Astrid Karlsen Scott.

Like the book, The 12th Man emphasizes the efforts of those who helped Baalsrud escape, which is in line with Baalsrud's own statements about the local population's courage. The plot also details the pursuit of Baalsrud from the Sicherheitsdienst (SD) leadership's perspective, depicting the escape as a cat-and-mouse game between Sturmbannführer Kurt Stage and Baalsrud.

== Plot ==
The 12th Man tells the dramatic story of Jan Baalsrud's escape from the Nazis during the Second World War.

In Shetland, 12 Norwegian resistance fighters board a fishing boat with eight tons of TNT and cross the North Sea as part of Operation Martin with a plan to sabotage German military facilities. The mission gets into trouble soon after reaching Norway, where their local contact is long dead and their identity is compromised by a German sympathiser, who informs the Germans about their arrival.

A German warship locates the fishing boat and opens fire. The resistance fighters ignite the TNT and jump into the water near the fjord. Eleven of the fighters are rounded up by the Germans on the beach. One is shot on the spot and ten are captured. Two die from torture while being interrogated, the other captive fighters are executed on the island of Tromsøya, after the German officers interrogate and torture them about their mission.

The 12th resistance fighter, Jan Baalsrud, manages to escape by hiding and swimming across the fjord, in sub-zero temperatures. He receives assistance from locals who risk their lives to help. He undergoes severe physical trials of endurance and hardship. Baalsrud is helped to escape from the island of Rebbenesøya to Sweden, via Lyngenhalvøya and Manndalen.

== Cast ==
- Thomas Gullestad as Jan Baalsrud
- Jonathan Rhys-Meyers as Sturmbannführer Kurt Stage
- Marie Blokhus as Gudrun Grønnvoll
- Mads Sjøgård Pettersen as Marius Grønnvoll
- Kim Jøran Olsen as Nils "Nigo" Nilsen
- Julia Bache-Wiig as Hanna Grønnvoll
- Vegar Hoel as Sigurd Eskeland
- Martin Kiefer as Major Walther Wenders
- Trond Peter Stamsø Munch as Aslak Fossvoll
- Maria Grazia Di Meo as Anna Pedersen
- Eirik Risholm Velle as Per Blindheim
- Håkon Thorstensen Nielsen as Erik Reichelt
- Torgny Gerhard Aanderaa as Sverre Odd Kverhellen
- Alexander Zwart as Sjur Ludvigsen Trovaag
- Ole Victor Corral as Magnus Johan Kvalvik
- Håkon Smeby as Harald Peter Ratvik
- Axel Barø Aasen as Frithjof Meyer Haugland
- Eric Dirnes as Bjørn Normann Bolstad
- Daniel Frikstad as Gabriel Salvesen
- Eric Redman as Oberscharführer Adam Schmitt
- Kenneth Åkerland Berg as Alfred A. Vik
- Sigurd Kornelius Lakseide as Ingvald Pedersen
- Aggie Peterson as Ragnhild Hansen
- Nils Utsi as an older Sámi

== Production ==
In March 2004, producer Veslemøy Ruud Zwart secured the film rights to the book Jan Baalsrud and Those Who Saved Him. Filming began by April 2016. The book and its film adaptation have the same protagonist as Arne Skouen's Oscar-nominated film Nine Lives (1957), in which Baalsrud's courage and stamina were also emphasized. Jan Baalsrud's story was also told in We Die Alone by David Howarth.

According to German documents, the Nazis captured and killed the other 11 members of the raid, but believed the 12th man had perished in the blast aboard their boat. There are no reports indicating that the Germans knew to hunt for Baalsrud, who claims that he killed two German soldiers in the fight.

Thomas Gullestad went on a diet to play the lead role.

== Reception ==
On review aggregator Rotten Tomatoes, the film holds an approval rating of 86%, based on 21 reviews with an average rating of 6.52/10. Metacritic gives the film a weighted average score of 70 out of 100, based on ten critics, indicating "generally favorable reviews".

Aftenposten observes that the film emphasizes Baalsrud's helpers and the struggle of the Resistance in a completely different way than in Arne Skouen's film Nine Lives (1957); The 12th Man offers a nuance to the Baalsrud legend.

Morten Ståle Nilsen, in Verdens Gang, refers to The 12th Man as "a solid, but predictable film". While complimenting the amazing scenery of Norway, VS said its magnificent nature couldn't save the film from being monotonous, overlong, and too focused on suffering.

Nicolai Berg Hansson, from Film Magasinet, said the film was successful as an action movie, but if one is to criticize it for something, "it may feel a bit… hollow. It might have said much more about human psychology, survival instinct and trauma".

Sigurd Vik, from P3's Film Police, believed the film was playing with clichés, especially in the depiction of the SS officer Kurt Stage. The review complimented director Zwart's influence of Nils Gaup, "when combining magnificent coastal and mountain scenery, and the insolence of the wilderness with dense and tough action sequences". The review also said that turning a serious Norwegian Resistance struggle into an action film works well.
