= Jan Baalsrud =

Commando in the Norwegian resistance

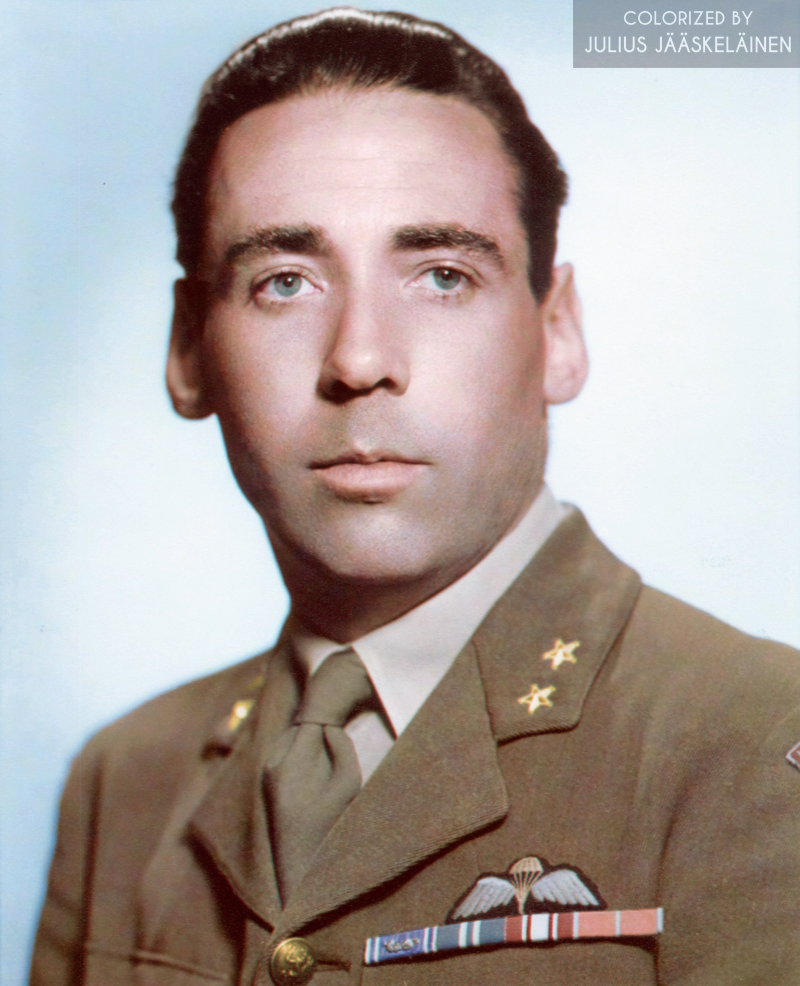
- Born: 13 December 1917; Kristiania, Norway
- Died: 30 December 1988 (aged 71); Kongsvinger, Norway
- Burial place: Manndalen, Norway
- Military career
- Allegiance: Norway
- Service years: 1940–1945
- Rank: Fenrik
- Units: Company Linge
- Awards: Member of the Order of the British Empire (MBE); St Olav's Medal with Oak Branch
- Other work: Chairman of the Norwegian Disabled Veterans Union (1957—1964)

Jan Sigurd Baalsrud, MBE (13 December 1917 – 30 December 1988) was a commando in the Norwegian resistance trained by the British during World War II. The 2017 film, The 12th Man, is based on his survival over the course of approximately two months in occupied Norway.

== Biography ==
=== Early life ===
Jan Baalsrud was born in Kristiania (now Oslo), Norway and moved with his family to Kolbotn in the early 1930s. He lived there until the 1950s. He graduated as a cartographical instrument maker in 1939.

=== World War II ===
During the German invasion of Norway in 1940, Baalsrud fought in Vestfold. He later escaped to Sweden, which was neutral, but he was convicted of espionage and expelled from the country.

In 1941, Baalsrud reached Great Britain after having travelled through the Soviet Union, India, Africa, Brazil and the US. He joined the Norwegian Company Linge. In early 1943, he, three other commandos, and a boat crew of eight, all Norwegians, embarked on a mission to destroy a German airfield control tower at Bardufoss, and recruit for the Norwegian resistance movement.

This mission, Operation Martin, was compromised when Baalsrud and his fellow soldiers, seeking a Resistance contact, accidentally made contact with a civilian shopkeeper who had taken over the store run by their intended contact and had the same name. Fearing for his life and suspecting it was a test by the Germans, he reported them to the local police office, which notified the Germans.

The morning after their blunder, on 29 March, their fishing boat Brattholm – containing around 100 kilograms of explosives intended to destroy the air control tower – was attacked by a German vessel. The Norwegians scuttled their boat by detonating the explosive using a time-delay fuse and fled in small boats, but they were promptly sunk by the Germans.

Baalsrud and others swam ashore in ice-cold Arctic waters. Baalsrud was the only commando to evade capture and, soaking wet and missing one sea boot, he escaped into a snow gully, where he shot and killed a German Gestapo officer with his pistol.

Robert Kolker summarises what happened next as follows:

What happened over those nine weeks remains one of the wildest, most unfathomable survival stories of World War II. Baalsrud's feet froze solid. An avalanche buried him up to his neck. He wandered in a snowstorm for three days. He was entombed alive in snow for another four days and abandoned under open skies for five more. Alone for two more weeks in a cave, he used a knife to amputate several of his own frostbitten toes to stop the spread of gangrene. He spent the last several weeks tied on a stretcher, near death, as teams of Norwegian villagers dragged him up and down hills and snowy mountains.

He evaded capture for approximately two months, suffering from frostbite and snow blindness. His deteriorating physical condition forced him to rely on the assistance of Norwegian patriots.

It was during this time, that he hid in a wooden hut at Revdal, which he called Hotel Savoy. Baalsrud operated on his feet with a pocket knife, as he suspected he had gangrene in two toes, resulting from the frostbite. Fearing it would spread, he cut off his big toe and the infected bit of the index toe.

Not long after that, Baalsrud was left on a high plateau, on a stretcher in the snow, where he was supposed to be collected by the Norwegian resistance. Due to weather and German patrols in the town of Manndalen, Kåfjord, he was there for 27 days and was close to death for lack of food. It was during this time, while he lay behind a snow wall built around a rock to shelter him, that Baalsrud amputated nine of his toes to stop the spread of gangrene. This action saved the rest of his feet.

Fellow Norwegians transported Baalsrud by stretcher toward the border with Finland. He was put in the care of some Sámi (the native people of northern Fennoscandia). While driving their reindeer on spring passage, they pulled him on a sled across Finland and into neutral Sweden. From Kilpisjärvi, in northern Finland, Baalsrud was collected by a Red Cross seaplane and flown to Boden.

Baalsrud spent seven months in a Swedish hospital in Boden before he was flown back to Britain in an RAF de Havilland Mosquito aircraft. He soon went to Scotland to help train other Norwegian patriots, who were going to enter Norway to continue the fight against the Germans.

After a long struggle to learn to walk without his toes, Baalsrud eventually was sent to Norway as an agent at his request. He was still in active service at the time of the war's end, in 1945. That ended German occupation, and Baalsrud traveled to Oslo to reunite with his family, whom he had left five years before.

Baalsrud was appointed honorary Member of the Order of the British Empire by the British. He was awarded the St. Olav's medal with Oak Branch by Norway. He was a Second Lieutenant (Fenrik).

=== Later years and death ===
After the war, Baalsrud contributed to the local scout and football associations. In addition, he was chairman of the Norwegian Disabled Veterans Union from 1957 to 1964. In 1962, he moved to Tenerife, Canary Islands, where he lived for most of the remainder of his life. He returned to Norway during his final years.

He lived there until his death on 30 December 1988, aged 71. His ashes are buried in Manndalen, in a grave shared with Aslak Aslaksen Fossvoll (1900–1943), one of the local men who helped him escape to Sweden.

== Legacy ==
An annual remembrance march in Baalsrud's honour takes place on 25 July in Troms, where the participants follow his escape route for nine days.

A street in Kolbotn, Norway is named Jan Baalsruds plass (Jan Baalsrud's Place) in his honor.

In 2020, a bust in bronze created by sculptor Håkon Anton Fagerås on commission was unveiled.

== In media ==
=== Books ===
- Baalsrud, Jan (1943). Operation Martin; List of Norwegian Refugees; Lt Jan Siguard Baalsrud's Report. London: UK National Archives. HS 2/161.
- Howarth, D. (1955). We Die Alone: A WWII Epic of Escape and Endurance. Guilford, Connecticut: Lyons Press. ISBN 1-55821-973-0.
- Scott, Astrid Karlsen; Haug, Tore (2001). Defiant Courage - Norway's Longest WW2 Escape. Olympia, Washington: Nordic Adventures. ISBN 0-9634339-8-9.

=== Films ===
- Ni Liv (En. Nine Lives) – 1957
- Den 12. mann (En. The 12th Man) – 2017
