= Metallitotuus =

Studio album by Teräsbetoni
- Released: April 6, 2005
- Recorded: January 2005
- Studio: Astia Studios
- Genre: Power metal, heavy metal
- Length: 50:57
- Label: Warner Music Finland
- Producer: Anssi Kippo

Teräsbetoni chronology
Metallitotuus (2005)	Vaadimme metallia (2006)

Metallitotuus (English: Metal Truth) is the debut album by Finnish heavy metal band Teräsbetoni.

It was rated a 72 out of 100 by MetalReviews.com.

== Track listing ==
1. Teräsbetoni – 5:54 ('Reinforced Concrete'. The might and superiority of the Brotherhood.)
2. Älä kerro meille – 3:29 ('Don't Tell Us'. The resolve and bloody life of the Brotherhood.)
3. Taivas lyö tulta – 3:21 ('Sky Strikes Fire'. Praise of the Brotherhood; exuberant almost to the point of incoherence.)
4. Vahva kuin metalli – 3:02 ('Strong as Metal'. The resolve, bloody life and divine favor of the Brotherhood.)
5. Silmä silmästä – 3:41 ('Eye for an Eye'. Betrayal and vengeance.)
6. Metallisydän – 5:27 ('Metal Heart'. The solitude and resolve of a lone warrior.)
7. Orjatar – 3:11 ('Slavewoman'. The pleasure slave of a warrior.)
8. Tuonelaan – 3:33 ('To the Underworld'. Assassination and post-mortem vengeance.)
9. Metallitotuus – 4:30 ('Metal Truth'. The values and conquests of the Brotherhood.)
10. Voittamaton – 3:50 ('Invincible'. The might and perseverance of the Brotherhood.)
11. Teräksen varjo – 4:32 ('Shadow of Steel'. Riding into battle.)
12. Maljanne nostakaa – 6:05 ('Raise Your Cup'. Rest and reflection after a battle.)

== Personnel ==
- Jarkko Ahola - lead vocals, bass
- Arto Järvinen - guitar, vocals
- Viljo Rantanen - guitar
- Jari Kuokkanen - drums
