= Nine Lives (Von Hertzen Brothers album) =

Studio album by Von Hertzen Brothers
- Released: 18 March 2013
- Recorded: The House of Love and Valamo Monastery
- Genre: Progressive rock, hard rock
- Length: 47:16
- Label: Spinefarm Records/Doing Being Music
- Producer: James Spectrum and Von Hertzen Brothers

Von Hertzen Brothers chronology
Stars Aligned (2011)	Nine Lives (2013)	New Day Rising (2015)

Singles from Nine Lives
- 1. "Flowers and Rust" Released: 4 February 2013; 2. "Insomniac" Released: 24 May 2013; 3. "Coming Home" Released: 29 August 2013

Nine Lives is the fifth studio album by Finnish progressive rock band Von Hertzen Brothers. It was released on 18 March 2013.

"Flowers and Rust", the first single from the album, won the "Anthem" award at the 2013 Progressive Music Awards.

== Track listing ==
All music composed by Von Hertzen Brothers. All lyrics written by Von Hertzen Brothers, except "Coming Home" and "Black Heart's Cry", written by Von Hertzen Brothers and L.A. Skin.

Nine Lives
No.	Title	Length
1.	"Insomniac"	3:57
2.	"Flowers and Rust"	4:22
3.	"Coming Home"	5:14
4.	"Lost in Time"	5:11
5.	"Separate Forevers"	4:44
6.	"One May Never Know"	3:54
7.	"World Without"	7:23
8.	"Black Heart's Cry"	4:56
9.	"Prospect for Escape"	7:35
Total length:		47:16

Limited deluxe edition bonus tracks
No.	Title	Length
10.	"The Climb"	4:40
11.	"Do What You Want with Me"	3:54
12.	"Between the Lines"	6:58

== Personnel ==
- Mikko von Hertzen — vocals, guitars
- Kie von Hertzen — guitars, vocals
- Jonne von Hertzen — bass, vocals
- Juha Kuoppala — keyboards
- Mikko Kaakkuriniemi — drums

Additional musicians

- Ville Riippa — knifonium
- William Zeitler — glass armonica

Production

- James Spectrum — production; mixing
- Von Hertzen Brothers — production
- Petri Majuri — mixing
- Mikko Raita — mixing
- Ilkka Herkman — mixing
- Jesse Vainio — mixing
- Svante Forsbäck — mastering

== Charts ==
Chart (2013)	Peak position
Finnish Albums Charts	2
