= Kingston Wall =

Finnish rock group

- Origin: Helsinki, Finland
- Genres: Psychedelic rock; progressive rock; acid rock
- Years active: 1987–1994
- Labels: Trinity; Zero (Japan); Zen Garden; Sony BMG
- Members: Petri Walli (vocals, guitars); Jukka Jylli (bass); Sami Kuoppamäki (drums)

Kingston Wall was a Finnish psychedelic/progressive rock group from Helsinki, formed in 1987. Influenced by such artists as Jimi Hendrix, Led Zeppelin and Pink Floyd, the group combined eastern themes, mysticism and psychedelia with acid rock. The band consisted of Petri Walli (guitars, lead vocals), Jukka Jylli (bass, backing vocals) and Sami Kuoppamäki (drums, percussion). Walli formed the group, composed most of the songs and wrote all the lyrics. He was also Kingston Wall's producer and manager and ran the band's own Trinity record label.

== History ==
=== Early days ===
Kingston Wall was formed in 1987, when Petri Walli asked Jukka Jylli to join his band. Petteri Ståhl and Jukka Häikiö later joined the band as drummer and lead singer, respectively. The band was named Moonshine Makers and played their first shows in 1988. Häikiö quit the band, tired of waiting for Walli to finish his long guitar solos. The band became a trio, with Walli taking the role of lead singer despite doubting his skills. The band was renamed Kingston Wall, derived from Walli's last name and the supposed name of a mental hospital in England, although Walli later gave varying explanations for the name. The capital of Jamaica, Kingston, allegedly had nothing to do with the name.

The band's first performance as Kingston Wall and as a trio, was in September 1988. This show spawned many others. During these early concerts, the band played their own songs and covers from bands such as the Beatles, Frank Zappa, the Who and Jimi Hendrix. They recorded a demo tape in early 1989, including the song “I’m Not the One”, which would appear on their first full-length album. After touring extensively and gaining some followers in the Helsinki rock scene, Walli was eager to take his music to another level. However, drummer Ståhl was not as talented a musician as Walli and Jylli, which held the band back. In Autumn 1989, Ståhl was asked to leave and he was replaced by the more technically capable Timo Joutsimäki. The new line-up recorded another demo, which included the songs “Used to Feel Before”, “Waste of Time” and “I Wish I Had Seen You”.

=== Kingston Wall I ===
After deciding the time was right for the band to record and release a full-length studio album, they sent their demos to labels that published music sung in English in Finland. Initially, no label was interested, until the label One Inch Rock signed Kingston Wall in 1990. Walli was given full control over the production of the album and he used his power on every aspect of the recording, which led to confrontations with Joutsimäki. While recording, the band continued playing live. Ralf Örn, responsible for signing Kingston Wall to One Inch Rock, became interested in managing the band. His connections helped the band secure their first and only show outside Finland in May 1990 in Tallinn, Estonia.

Confrontations between Walli and Joutsimäki continued, and Joutsimäki began arriving to rehearsal and shows drunk and late. Eventually, the drummer stopped appearing all together and reportedly sold his drums as redundant. Walli started looking for a new drummer, and after a month of searching, heard of a promising young talent, Sami Kuoppamäki, who was studying in Los Angeles Musicians Institute. Walli sent him their demo tapes, and, impressed by their sound, Kuoppamäki decided to join. The band began hosting their own club night which they dubbed Freakout. During Freakout nights, Kingston Wall performed with various other local bands, often playing cover songs, alternative versions of their own songs and with various line-ups. Kuoppamäki now being a stable member of the band, the recording of the first album was restarted from scratch. The recording was finished, but One Inch Rock decided that they did not want to release the album after all, instead opting to give the distribution rights to EMI Finland. To produce the album, Walli founded Pedro Cucaracha Productions and the record label Trinity. Kingston Wall released their first, self-titled album, (later referenced and re-released as I) in January 1992. The official release gig for the new album was 31 January 1992 at Tavastia Club. This was followed by a number of gigs throughout Finnish clubs and festivals. Their debut album consisted mainly of psychedelic hard rock along with a cover of Jimi Hendrix' song "Fire", which gained the group some popularity among the Finnish radio stations. The album culminated in the heavily progressive, 21-minute track, "Mushrooms".

=== Kingston Wall II ===
In the summer of 1992, Walli got interested in techno music and started going to techno raves, where LSD and magic mushrooms were commonplace. Walli brought his newfound love for techno into the music of Kingston Wall, by covering "I Feel Love" by Donna Summer. The following autumn, the band entered the studio to record their next studio album, II. Similar to the previous album, II was produced by Pedro Cucaracha Productions and distributed by EMI Finland. The recordings went smoothly and were finished in a few weeks and the release gig was held 29 January 1993 at Tavastia, followed by a 13 date Finnish tour. After playing at many major music festivals in Finland in the summer of 1993, Walli was desperate for the band to gain international success. However, large international record labels were not interested in signing the band. The band continued hosting their Freakout club nights, during which they now implemented more techno and house elements by having a DJ play with the band.

The album evolved the sound of the band by introducing more acoustic and folk elements to their songs, like acoustic guitars and violins in "Istwan" (violin played by Ufo Mustonen) and saxophones in "Shine On Me" (saxophone played by Sakari Kukko). They also included a cross-genre cover version of the Donna Summer disco classic "I Feel Love".

=== III - Tri-Logy and Walli's death ===
In January 1994, Walli went on holiday to India, where he met Ior Bock, a Finnish mystic, who, during hashish fuelled nights, told listeners of the Bock saga, an eccentric explanation about the origins of the alphabets, words, and the whole human history. Inspired by the Bock saga, Walli wrote and rewrote new songs for their upcoming album, which was to be called III – Tri-Logy. The music and lyrics were riddled with references to previous Kingston Wall releases and the Bock saga. Compared to the two weeks it took to record the previous album, this time the band had booked 13 weeks of studio time. Unlike on previous albums, each band member recorded their parts separately, and some of the songs the band had never practised before entering the studio. The album ended up being the most expensive self-published album in Finland at that time. The album was different in style and tone compared to their two previous releases as it included more hard rock sounds, at times combined with dub reggae, techno, and synthesizers arranged by Kimmo Kajasto (from Koneveljet and Rinneradio). The last song on the album, "The Real Thing", runs for 18 minutes and again features Sakari Kukko on saxophone, along with ambient synthesizer pads played by Kimmo Kajasto.

After an eight-month break from playing live, the band returned to the stage in August 1994, playing their first gig under the alias "Spirits of Istwan". The official release gig was held 1 October 1994, once again at Tavastia and was followed by a Finnish tour. Meanwhile, Walli's erratic behaviour and obsession with the Bock saga had grown to a level where people started avoiding him. Growing tensions and the harshness of life on tour took their toll on the morale of both the band and crew, and the band voted the stop the tour short, cancelling the final show of the tour.

In December, Kingston Wall played three more gigs. They played their last public show in Lepakko, Helsinki in December 1994 and their last show ever was some days later in Sörnäinen prison in Helsinki. After this, the band called it quits in a local cafeteria and each of the members went on their separate ways. Walli left for India and shortly after his return to Finland, on 28 June 1995, jumped to his death from the tower of Töölö Church in central Helsinki.

The suicide was apparently caused by several factors. Walli had lost his faith in Ior Bock's mythologies and felt ashamed for basing the band's third album on what he now perceived as deceptions. He had also broken up with his girlfriend some months earlier. Walli was later buried in the Hietaniemi Cemetery, about one kilometer away from his place of death.

=== Legacy and tribute concerts ===
During their active time, Kingston Wall never achieved mainstream popularity. All their albums were printed in limited numbers and released on Walli's own independent label, Trinity. It was only after the group had disbanded that their popularity slowly grew through word-of-mouth.

Although Kingston Wall never played outside Finland apart from one gig in Estonia, the group is considered even by many Finns as one of the country's best hard rock groups. Their albums have appeared on the Finnish Top 40 album charts. The cult following status of Kingston Wall has also gained them a steadily growing fan base around the world, mostly thanks to the Internet.

Kingston Wall has influenced many Finnish rock groups and received cover tributes from artists such as The Rasmus ("Used to Feel Before" on their single Madness) and Amorphis ("And I Hear You Call" on My Kantele EP).

In October 2018, the band announced on their Facebook page that they would be playing a gig at Tavastia Club in Helsinki to celebrate the 50th birthday of Petri Walli. Performing under the name Kingston Wall by JJylli, Kuoppis and Brothers von Hertzen, the outfit included Jylli on bass, Kuoppamäki on drums and the Von Hertzen Brothers on guitars, lead vocals and percussion. The Tavastia show was sold out in minutes, which prompted the band to embark on a full-fledged tour.

To celebrate the 30th anniversary of the band's final public concert, Jylli and Kuoppamäki played a tribute concert in Helsinki Ice Hall on 5 December 2024. The duo were joined onstage by Jesper Anastasiadis, Juhani Grönroos, Esa Holopainen and Mikko Von Hertzen. The anniversary concert were preceded by smaller concerts at Finnish festivals during the summer of 2024.

=== Re-issues, remixes and books ===
All the original Kingston Wall albums and singles under the Trinity label have been since sold out and are regarded collector's items. The III - Tri-Logy was re-issued by the Finnish record label Zen Garden in 1998. A limited amount of 1000 copies included a bonus CD along with each of the three original remastered albums. The limited re-issues sold out quickly. The bonus CDs contained single B-sides and previously unreleased live recordings. In 2000, a remix album titled Freakout Remixes was released. This tribute album included techno and psychedelic trance remixes of the original Kingston Wall songs, made by such Finnish artists as Accu, Squaremeat and Texas Faggott.

A live CD box set Real Live Thing was released in 2005. The box set features three CDs recorded at various gigs during the band's existence. The tracks were selected for this album by bass player Jukka Jylli.

In 2023, remixes of all three Kingston Wall studio albums were released. The albums were remixed by Robert Palomäki, who also mixed the band live and participated in the recording sessions of II and Tri-Logy.

In February 2014, Finnish rock journalist Viljami Puustinen published the book Kingston Wall: Petri Wallin saaga ('Kingston Wall: The Saga of Petri Walli'), a 325-page in-depth biography of Petri Walli that also explores the band's history in detail.

Another book about the band, titled Kingston Wallin perintö ('The Legacy of Kingston Wall') was released in 2023. In this book, Kimmo Aroluoma, inspired by the tribute concert tour in 2019, recounts his own relationship with the band's music and aims to uncover the magic of their sound by tracing the guitar, amplifier and guitar pedals played by Petri Walli.
