= Ninja Sarasalo =

Finnish model and singer

- Born: May 8, 1982 (age 44); Helsinki
- Occupations: Plus-size model and singer
- Website: Ninja Sarasalo official site

Ninja Bettina Elisabeth Sarasalo (born May 8, 1982) is a Finnish plus-size model and singer.

Sarasalo was born in Helsinki. She has worked for Jean-Paul Gaultier and Garnier and her photos have been published in magazines like ELLE, Vogue and GQ. Sarasalo has also walked on catwalks in Milan, New York City, Paris and Tokyo. She featured in the music video for "Right Here in My Arms" by the Finnish band HIM in 1999. She is known for her distinct facial features, which she says she inherited from her grandmother, who was of Russian and Swedish ancestry.

In 2006, Ninja Sarasalo released her first music single, Fashion, with the stage name Ninja. The single was at number one in Finnish single chart in week 11, 2006. Ninja's first album I Don't Play Guitar was released in January 2007.

Even though her first single "Hush Hush" was released in 2006/2007, in September 2007, the song was number #15 in the Swedish album charts. In late 2007 she started promoting "Hush Hush" in Sweden.

In February 2008 Ninja participated in Finnish semifinal for representing the country in Eurovision Song Contest 2008 with the song Battlefield of Love but it did not make it into the finals.

== Discography ==
=== Albums ===
- "I don't play Guitar" (2007)

=== Singles ===
- "Fashion" (2006 - FIN #1)
- "Hush Hush" (2006/2007 - SWE #11)
- "Champagne" (2007 - FIN #11)

She also appeared in a music-video, Right Here in My Arms, by HIM.
