= The 9 Lives (comics) =

Manga series by Bayou and Rachel Manija Brown

The 9 Lives is an original English-language manga created by artist Bayou and writer Rachel Manija Brown, published by Tokyopop.

== Plot ==
A race of aliens resembling humans (with anthropomorphized qualities of cats) comes to Earth for one purpose: to serve humans. True to their name, they possess nine chances at life as long as they are not "too dead". In order to return to their home planet, they must give eight of their lives to a human master. The 9-Lives are treated as second-class citizens or pets. A young 9-Life named Conri is looking for his twin sister while avoiding becoming anyone's pet. While being chased for stealing some food, he is saved by a human named Adrian. Conri secretly follows Adrian back to his house and eats all his food. Adrian catches him and they come to a mutual agreement that Conri can stay in Adrian's house as long as he cleans the house. Sadly, he isn't a very good cleaner and breaks more than he cleans. Conri and Adrian go through an emergency hospital visit and get tangled up in a gang war, but in the end, they come to know more about each other and trust the other a little more.

== Main characters ==
Conri
A male calico 9-Life and one of the two main characters of this story. Conri just wants to live a life of freedom while also trying to find his twin sister. He was living in hiding, avoiding possible 9-Life owners and getting angry at all the injustice he sees being done to his people such as tight collars, pornography, and wasted food (which he sees no harm in taking until he gets caught). As an angry mob chases him (for this crime), he is saved by Adrian, resulting in their future friendship. Conri is a typical cat in a human body: lazy, gluttonous, proud, likes to chase mice, and hates strong-smelling foods. He does not trust easily and at the end of the first book, it seems as though Adrian must still earn some of Conri's trust.

Adrian
A normal human male who is unexpectedly thrown into a life with Conri. After saving the little cat-boy, he claims that he does not want nor will he ever want a pet. Little does Conri know that this decision resulted from the death of one of his past friends as they saved their pet. Because this experience was traumatic, he is distant—not really a bad person, just not wanting to get too attached to anyone or anything. He has a strange Indonesian neighbor who claims Adrian's favorite food is stinky bean paste, something that Conri strongly dislikes. Adrian's personality is honest, kind, generous, and understanding, though sometimes these traits are masked in hostility.

== Memorable Quotes ==
Adrian

- (Comes through the door) I'm ho...*sees Conri and his neighbor have fallen on each other*...mo?
- (Conri bites him after saving him from the mob) *SMACK!* How DARE you bite your savior!?
- (After taking Conri to the hospital for slitting his wrists) You don't understand. On earth when someone tells you to drop dead, you're not supposed to take it literally.
- (After a nurse says it doesn't matter if Conri would have died because of his many lives) That's horrible! EveryONE of his lives are just as precious as yours or mine!

Conri

- (Adrian says) Isn't there ever a time you're NOT angry? *Conri thinks* When I'm eating!
