= Movetron =

Finnish Eurodance and pop band

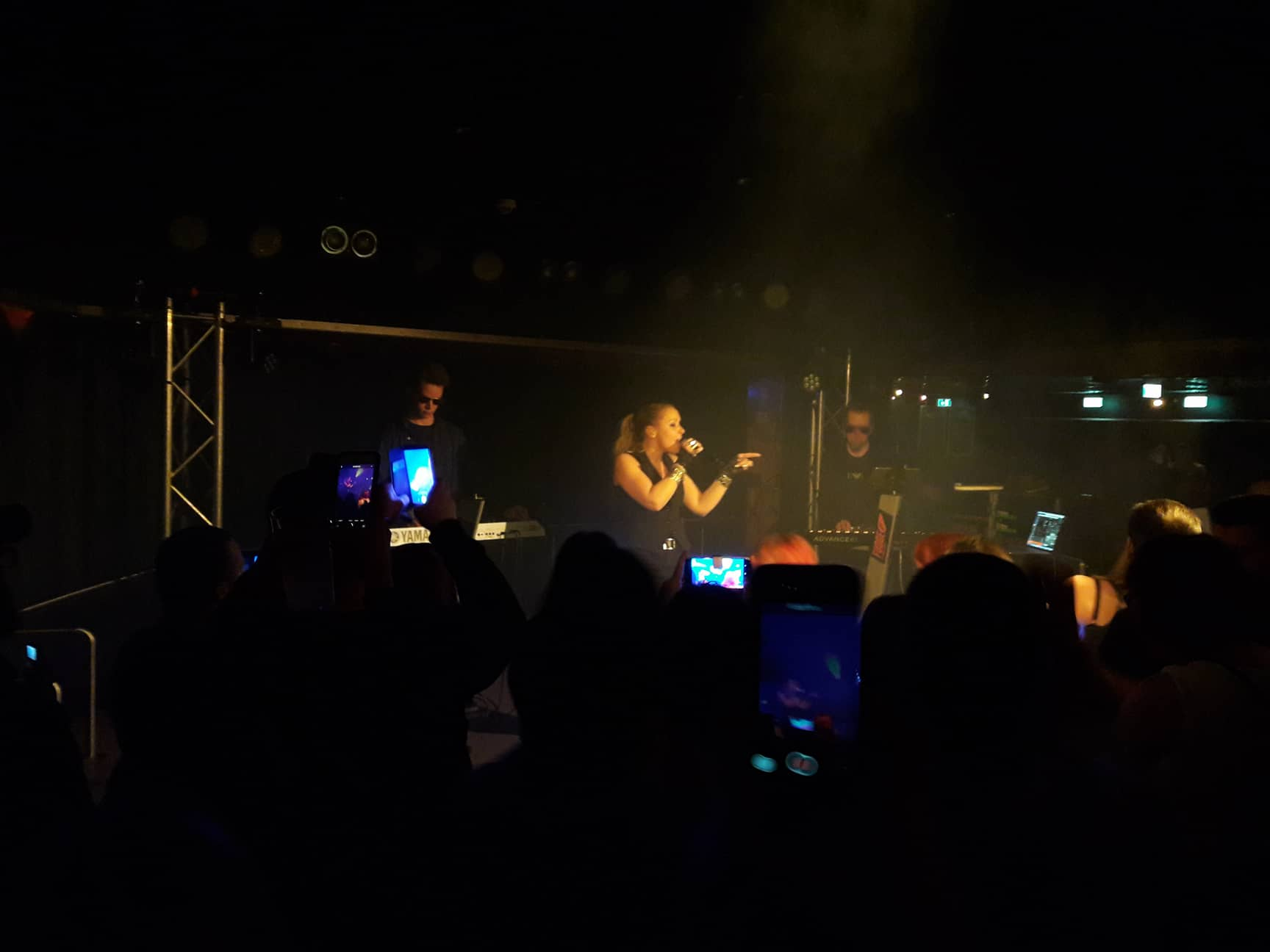
- Movetron performing in Turku, Finland on 24 February 2018.

Background information
- Origin: Finland
- Genres: Eurodance
- Years active: 1994–2000, 2007–
- Labels: PolyGram, Universal
- Members: Päivi Lepistö; Jukka Tanttari; Timo Löyvä
- Past members: Chris Sanders; James Black
- Website: www.movetron.fi

Movetron is a Finnish Eurodance and pop band, first established in the mid-1990s by Päivi Lepistö, Jukka Tanttari, and Timo Löyvä, and re-established in 2007.

== 1994–2000 ==
Their first album Romeo ja Julia sold double platinum, peaked at #1 and stayed in the official Finnish Album charts for 38 weeks. The album produced three Top-10 hits in the Top 20 singles chart: "Romeo ja Julia" (#2), "Ristinolla" (#1 for two weeks) and the ballad "Alla koivupuun" (#10). A platinum edition of the album was released with four bonus tracks.

The group's second album Soittorasia was released in October 1996 and sold gold immediately. By the end of the year, the album had sold over 40,000 copies and gone platinum. Hits such as "Prinssi" (#6) and "Flavio" (#8) were included in the album.

Third album 3. aste was released in November 1997. Two lead singles were released before the album. More heavy oriented "Tellusnainen" and basic Eurodance song "Lähden", both of which flopped in singles chart. Album sold little less than 10,000 copies and did not manage to reach Top-40 Albums chart at all.

Movetron decided to change their singing language to English and they also had a new member James Black (from 1990s hit group 3rd Nation) and they released new single "VoodooMan". It peaked #15 in singles chart.

A new album was released in July 2000, selling approximately 1,000 copies. Movetron decided to break up.

== 2007–present ==
They started as a group again in 2007, and released hit single "Ei kenenkään maa" (#9) which received much radio airplay. Movetron was a finalist in the Finnish qualification of the 2008 Eurovision Song Contest with their song "Cupido". It also became a hit peaking #15 in the singles chart. A compilation album called Irtokarkkeja - Makeimmat hitit was released in March 2008. It peaked #4 in Top-40 albums chart, selling 20,000 copies, going gold.

Their fifth album Ei kenenkään maa was released in October 2008 in Finland. It peaked at #30 in official albums chart. In 2011 Movetron ended their recording deal with Universal Music. A new deal was signed with AXR Music.

== Discography ==
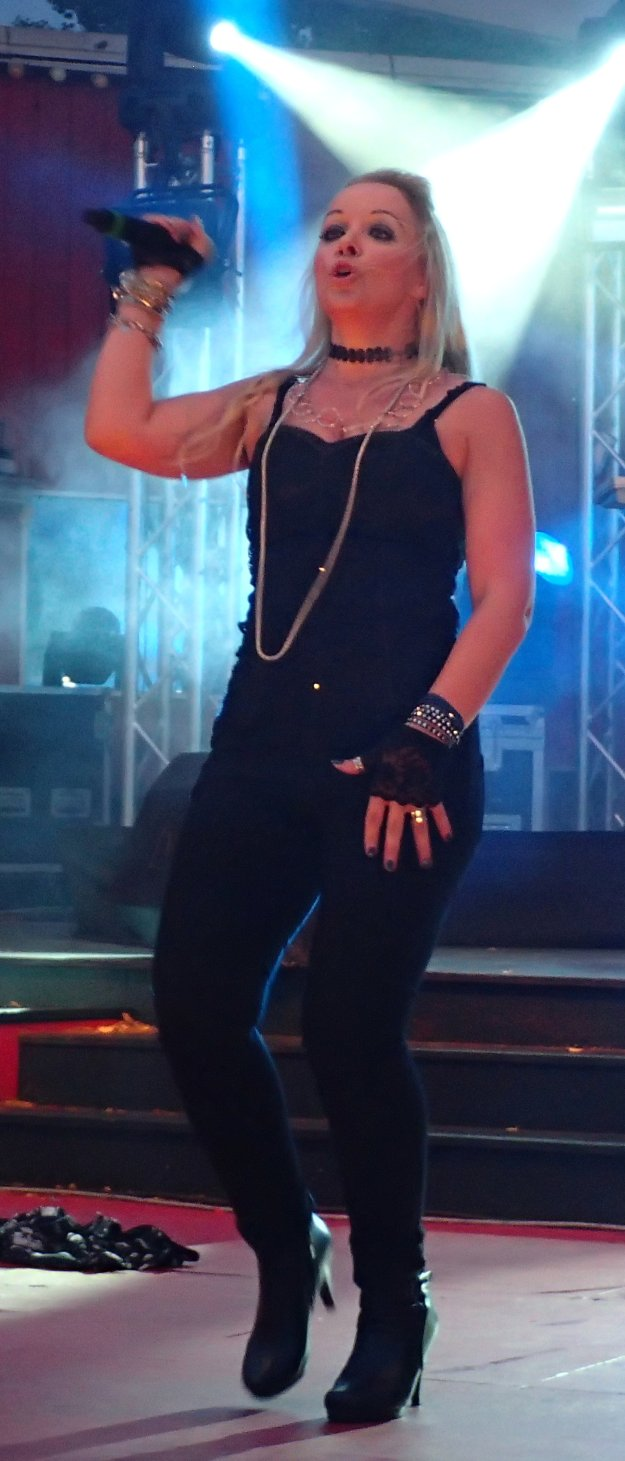
singer Päivi Lepistö

Best position in the Finnish charts in parentheses.

=== Albums ===
- Romeo ja Julia ("Romeo and Juliet") (1995) (#1)
- Soittorasia ("Musical Box") (1996) (#5)
- 3. aste ("3rd Grade") (1997)
- The 4th Dimension (2000)
- Irtokarkkeja – makeimmat hitit (compilation) (2008) (#4)
- Ei kenenkään maa ("No Man's Land") (2008) (#30)

=== Singles ===
- "Valkoinen valhe / Voikukkaseppele" (1994)
- "Romeo ja Julia" (1994) (#2)
- "Ristinolla" (1995) (#1)
- "Alla koivupuun" (1995) (#10)
- "Romeo & Juliet" (1996)
- "Prinssi" (1996) (#6)
- "Soittorasia" (1996) (#13)
- "Flavio" (1996) (#8)
- "Missä sä oot?" (1997)
- "Tellusnainen" (1997)
- "Lähden" (1997)
- "Mombasa" (1998)
- "Voodoo" (1999) (#15)
- "I'll Be Your Baby" (1999)
- "Heart N' Soul" (2000)
- "Love Springs Eternal" (2000)
- "Ei kenenkään maa" (2007) (#9)
- "Cupido" (2008) (#15)
- "Elä nyt" (2008) (#20)
- "Otanko askeleen" (2008)
- "Filminauha" (2009)
- "Lanteisiin" (2011)
- "Medieval Love (feat Vaida)/Jäi jäljet hiekkaan" (2012)
- "Kulje Vaan" (2014)
- "Älä Unohda Minua (Feat. Poju)" (2015) (#8)
- "Nyt on Jatkot (Feat. Poju)" (2016) (#28)
