= Love Remains the Same (album) =

Love Remains The Same

Studio album by Von Hertzen Brothers
- Released: 2008 (Finland)
- Recorded: MD Studios Helsinki, Finland
- Genre: Progressive rock
- Length: 76:00
- Label: Dynasty Recordings
- Producer: von Hertzen Brothers

Von Hertzen Brothers chronology
Approach (2006)	Love Remains The Same (2008)	Stars Aligned (2011)

Love Remains The Same is the Finnish rock band Von Hertzen Brothers's third full-length album. The album was released on 14 May 2008 in Finland and reached the number one position in the Finnish charts.

== Track listing ==
1. "Bring Out the Sun (So Alive)" – 10:45
2. "Spanish 411" – 7:01
3. "Freedom Fighter" – 4:25
4. "Somewhere in the Middle" – 7:08
5. "In The End" – 6:08
6. "Faded Photographs" – 3:48
7. "Silver Lover" – 6:06
8. "I Came For You" – 7:19
9. "The Willing Victim" – 9:18

== Personnel ==
- Kie von Hertzen - Lead guitars, vocals, etc.
- Mikko von Hertzen - Lead vocals, guitars, etc.
- Jonne von Hertzen - Bass, vocals, etc.
- Juha Kuoppala - Keyboards
- Mikko Kaakkuriniemi - Drums and Percussion

== See also ==
- List of number-one albums of 2008 (Finland)
