= Von Hertzen Brothers =

Finnish rock band

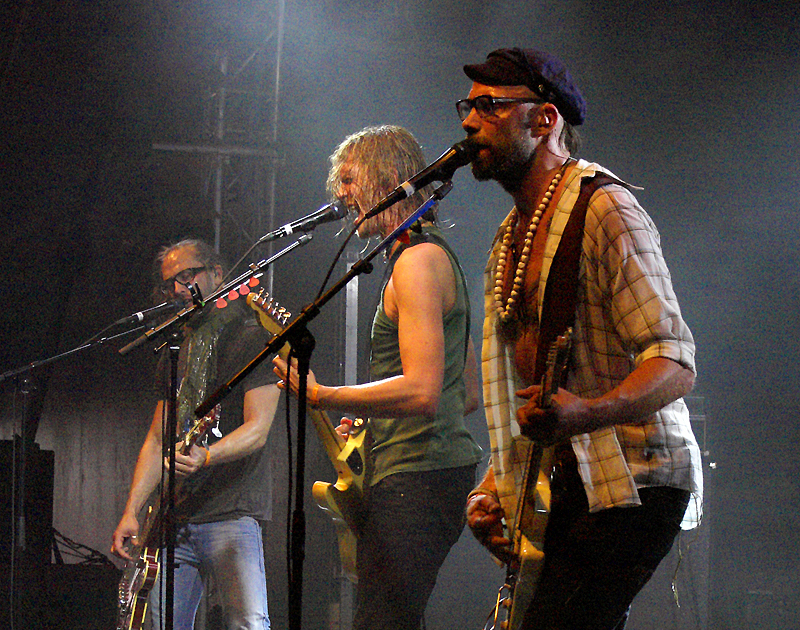
- Left to right: Jonne von Hertzen, Mikko von Hertzen, Kie von Hertzen.

Background information
- Origin: Finland
- Genres: Progressive rock, hard rock, psychedelic rock
- Years active: 2001–present
- Label: Doing Being Music, Universal Music, Spinefarm Records
- Members: Kie von Hertzen (guitars, backing vocals), Mikko von Hertzen (vocals, guitar); Jonne von Hertzen (bass guitar, backing vocals)
- Past members: Mikko Kaakkuriniemi (drums), Juha Kuoppala (keyboards)
- Website: Official website

Von Hertzen Brothers is a Finnish rock group formed in 2000, by three brothers. Their music is a mix of classic rock and progressive elements, folk, punk and contemporary rock.

Each of the brothers have a notable history in the Finnish rock scene, starting from the early 1990s.
Guitarist-singer Kie von Hertzen has played in Don Huonot^{[fi]} (1992–2003).
Singer-guitarist Mikko von Hertzen is an ex-member of Egotrippi^{[fi]} (1994–1998) and Lemonator (1995–1998).
Vocalist-bass guitarist Jonne von Hertzen won the National Rock Contest in 1998 with his band Cosmos Tango and later joined to play the bass in Jonna Tervomaa's band (1999–2005).
From 2006 to 2016 the band had two other permanent members: Mikko Kaakkuriniemi on drums and Juha Kuoppala on keyboards. In 2017 the band returned to its 2006 lineup with Sami Kuoppamäki on drums. The current lineup also features Markus Pajakkala on keyboards and woodwinds.

== History ==
The father of the brothers, Hasse von Hertzen, played guitar in an early sixties band called The Savages and later in The Roosters. Their uncle Lasse von Hertzen was a member of a well-known 1970s folk band in Scandinavia, Cumulus.

Von Hertzen Brothers released their first full-length album Experience in 2001 on which most of the instruments were played by the brothers themselves. Mikko played the drum parts as well as most of the main vocals. The album was released by an indie label, Zen Garden.

In the spring of 2006 the band released their second album titled Approach with Sami Kuoppamäki on the drums. The album achieved gold sales in Finland and won the "Emma" award for "Best Rock Album of the Year" in Emma-gaala,^{[fi]} the primary recording industry awards event in Finland. The album's singles "Let Thy Will Be Done", "Kiss a Wish", and "Disciple of the Sun" gained notable airplay on Finnish radio and became the band's first hits.

On 14 May 2008 the band released their third album, Love Remains The Same which opened at No 1 on the Finnish national sales chart. The album remained No 1 for three continuous weeks and reached gold sales in two months. The band recorded the sessions at Dynasty Studios in Helsinki and a video studio diary is available of the recordings on YouTube. The release followed a full-length tour in Finland and shows in Italy, Denmark, Japan and The Netherlands.

In 2011 the band's own label, Doing Being Music, signed a licensing deal with Universal Music and after a three-year break the band released its fourth full-length studio album Stars Aligned. It was produced together with James Spectrum, known from his project Pepe Deluxé. The album opened at No 1 on the national album sales chart and later reached gold status. Due to the contract with Universal, the album was the first VHB album to be internationally published and distributed. Consequently, the band started touring abroad to eastern Europe and Scandinavia in support of bands like Pain Of Salvation and Opeth. Stars Aligned was especially well received in the UK and the band has played there frequently since. Some of their notable support performances include Foo Fighters, 30 Seconds to Mars, Neil Young and ZZ Top. In September 2011 the band and Rubik performed a unique sold-out show "A Night At The Huvila" based on the music of Queen.

In March 2013 the brothers released their fifth album, titled "Nine Lives". As the first band in Finland, the release performance of the album was streamed worldwide in real time through YouTube. The album opened at No 2 on the national sales chart and at No 31 on the UK Rock Album Chart. The album was nominated in the "Best Rock Album Of The Year" category in Classic Rock magazine. The first single of the album "Flowers and Rust" won the anthem of the year prize at the "Progressive Rock Awards" in London in September 2013. The other two singles of the album, "Insomniac" and "Coming home" gained notable airplay in Rock-oriented radio stations in the UK and Finland. The album artwork, a painting of nine tiger heads by Samuli Heimonen, gave the brothers "godfather" status in ALTA (Amur Leopard and Tiger Alliance) for being involved with protecting and preserving the living conditions of the Amur Tiger.

After touring in Finland and in the UK for the whole of 2013 and the first part of 2014, the brothers started writing new material. By May 2014 it was decided that the sixth studio album was to be recorded with GGGarth (Garth Richardson) in Vancouver, Canada. GGGarth, who was to produce and oversee the recordings of the album, flew over to Helsinki in August for Pre-production. The recordings started on 1 September at the Farm Studios (formally known as Little Mountain Studios) in Vancouver. The album was named New Day Rising after the opening track. It was mastered by Ted Jensen at Sterling Sound, NYC and released worldwide by Spinefarm Records in March 2015. The album cover was again a painting by Samuli Heimonen.

In 2016, when the New Day Rising tour was over, the band announced that the would be taking an indefinite hiatus. The break did not last long as in October 2017 von Hertzen Brothers came out with their seventh album War Is Over, which was released by Mascot Label Group. Also new collaborations with ITB (International Talent Booking) and 7pm management were established. The album release was accompanied by a headlining tour in the UK which continues in Finland through the end of 2017.

In autumn 2020 the brothers announced that they have been writing music for their eighth studio album, and on 13 December they announced that the album titled Red Alert in the Blue Forest would be released on 18 March 2022.

== Discography ==
=== Albums ===
Year	Title	Peak positions
Year	Title	FIN
2001	Experience (Re-released in 2006)	39
2006	Approach	5
2008	Love Remains the Same	1
2011	Stars Aligned	1
2013	Nine Lives	2
2015	New Day Rising	1
2017	War Is Over	4
2022	Red Alert in the Blue Forest	2
2024	In Murmuration	13

Compilation albums

Year	Album	Peak positions
Year	Album	FIN
2012	Best Of	7

=== Singles and EPs ===
- 2001: Immortal Life
- 2001: Devil of a Girl
- 2006: Kiss a Wish
- 2006: Let Thy Will Be Done (Promo)
- 2006: Disciple Of The Sun
- 2006: In Your Arms
- 2008: In The End
- 2008: Freedom Fighter
- 2008: Faded Photographs
- 2010: Miracle
- 2011: Angels' Eyes
- 2011: Gloria
- 2011: Always Been Right
- 2013: Flowers and Rust
- 2013: Insomniac
- 2013: Coming Home
- 2015: New Day Rising
- 2015: Hold Me Up
- 2015: Sunday Child
- 2017: The Arsonist
- 2017: Long Lost Sailor
- 2018: War Is Over
- 2018: To The End of the World
- 2018: Jerusalem
- 2022: All of a Sudden, You're Gone
- 2022: Peace Patrol
- 2024: Starlings
- 2024: Ascension Day
- 2024: The Relapse

== See also ==
- Dynasty (association)
