= Nine Lives (1957 film) =

Ni liv
- Norwegian classics DVD cover
- Directed by: Arne Skouen
- Written by: Arne Skouen
- Produced by: Arne Skouen
- Starring: Jack Fjeldstad; Henny Moan; Alf Malland; Joachim Holst-Jensen; Rolf Søder
- Distributed by: Louis de Rochemont Associates
- Release date: 11 November 1957
- Running time: 96 minutes
- Country: Norway
- Language: Norwegian

Nine Lives (Norwegian: Ni liv) is a 1957 Norwegian film about Jan Baalsrud, a commando and member of the Norwegian resistance during World War II. Trained in Britain, in 1943, he participates in an operation to destroy a German air control tower. The mission is compromised when he and his fellow soldiers accidentally make contact with a civilian, rather than a Resistance member, who betrays them to the Nazis.

The film was directed by Arne Skouen and is based on the book We Die Alone (1955) by British author David Howarth.

In 1958, the film was nominated for an Oscar for Best Foreign Language Film and was entered into the Cannes Film Festival. In 2005, a critics' panel voted it the greatest Norwegian film ever made.

== Plot ==
The morning after their blunder, the resistance fighters are attacked by a German vessel. The Norwegians' boat contains 8 tons of explosives intended to destroy the air control tower. The commandos explode their payload, and Baalsrud and some other survivors flee. They swim ashore in ice-cold Arctic waters. Baalsrud is the only one to escape the Nazi roundup. Soaking wet and missing one shoe, he escapes up a ravine, and shoots and kills a Gestapo officer.

Baalsrud evades capture for roughly two months, during which time he suffers from frostbite and snow blindness. He fails in his bid to reach the border of neutral Sweden and throws himself at the mercy of some Norwegians who have access to the Norwegian underground. While hiding in their barn, he amputates most of his frostbitten toes with an ordinary knife, because gangrene has set in.

The fellow Norwegians manage to move Baalsrud close to the Swedish border, but are forced to leave him in a snow cave for roughly two weeks. They make a new plan to get him over the border, having him transported by a reindeer herder, who finally gets him across the frontier to safety.

Baalsrud recuperates in a Swedish hospital for seven months. He returns to England through South Africa, Asia, Australia, New Zealand, and America before rejoining the fight.

== Cast ==
- Jack Fjeldstad - Jan Baalsrud
- Henny Moan - Agnes
- Alf Malland - Martin
- Joachim Holst-Jensen - Bestefar (grandpa)
- Lydia Opøien - Jordmoren (midwife)
- Edvard Drabløs - Skolelæreren (schoolteacher)
- Sverre Hansen - Skomakeren (cobbler)
- Rolf Søder - Sigurd Eskeland
- Ottar Wicklund - Henrik
- Olav Nordrå - Konrad
- Alf Ramsøy - Ivar, kjelketrekker (pulled the sled)
- Jens Bolling - Alfred, kjelketrekker
- Per Bronken - Ole, kjelketrekker
- Grete Nordrå - Stenografen (stenographer)
- Lillebil Nordrum - Sykepleiersken ("Nurse")
- Wilfred Breistrand as a sled puller

== See also ==
- List of Norwegian submissions for the Academy Award for Best Foreign Language Film
- List of submissions to the 30th Academy Awards for Best Foreign Language Film
- Nine lives (disambiguation)
- The 12th Man (2017)
