= Jukka Jylli =

Finnish bass-player

Jukka Kalevi Jylli
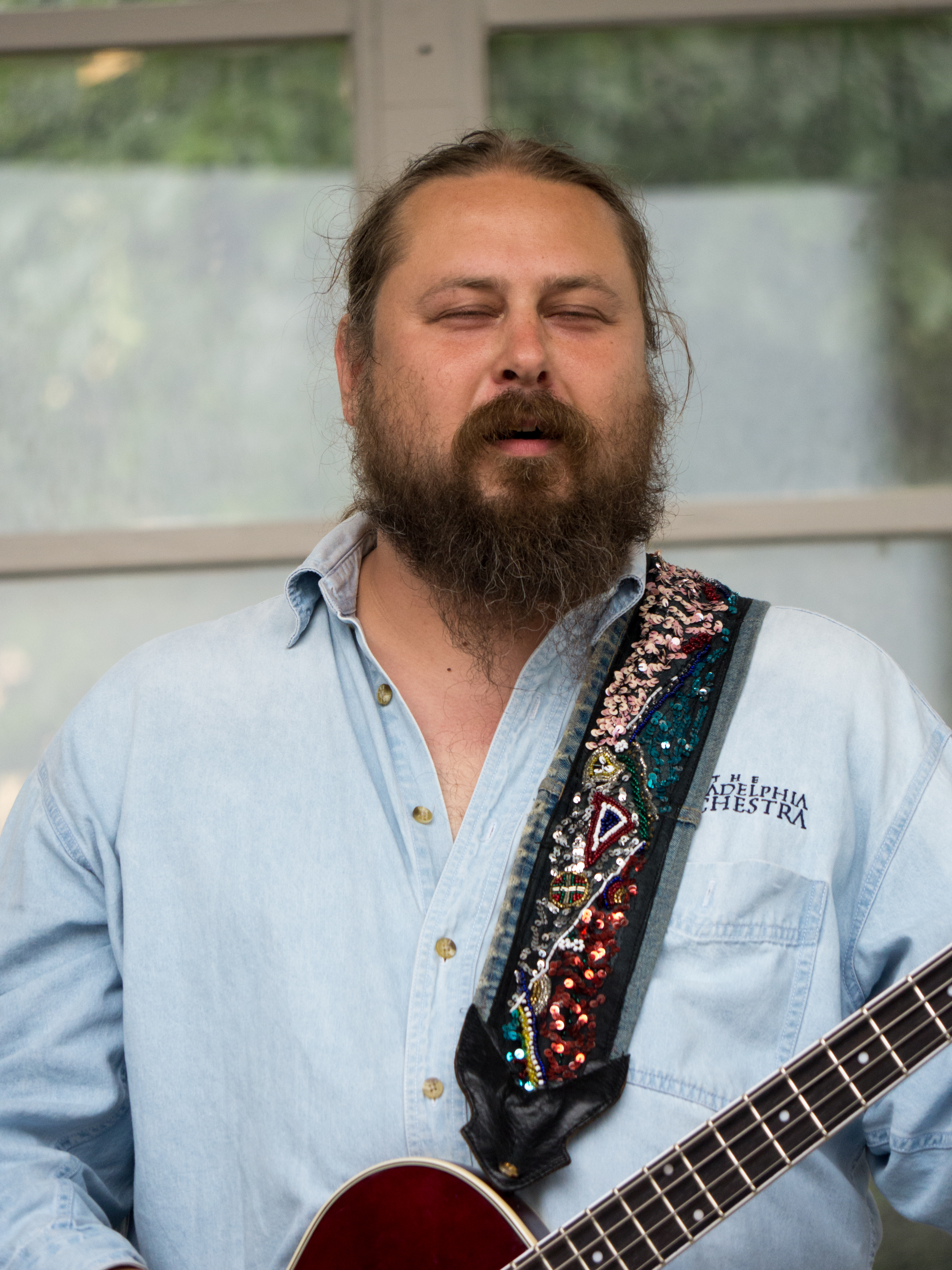
- Jukka Jylli

Background information
- Occupation: Bass player

Jukka Kalevi Jylli is a Finnish bass-player who played in the psychedelic/progressive rock group Kingston Wall.

== Career ==
After Kingston Wall was disbanded, he played in a group called Saunabadh. At the same time as his rock career flourished Jylli was also active in the Helsinki pub music scene, playing with the pioneering multinational local punk-folk band Boolabus, fronted by the late Mark Flynn. Nowadays his most active band is Zook. Jukka Jylli plays in the Marenne Band's debut album to be released in 2009.
