= Teräsbetoni =

Finnish heavy metal band

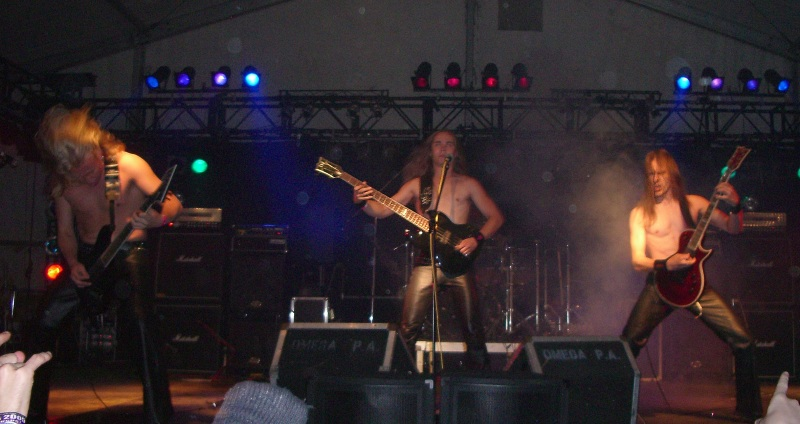
- Teräsbetoni at Wacken Open Air 2005

Background information
- Also known as: Terasbetoni
- Origin: Finland
- Genres: Heavy metal, power metal
- Years active: 2002–2011, 2013, 2014, 2015–present
- Labels: Warner Music Finland (until 2010), Sakara Records (2010–present)
- Members: Jarkko Ahola; Arto Järvinen; Viljo Rantanen; Jari Kuokkanen
- Website: terasbetoni.com

Teräsbetoni is a Finnish heavy/power metal band. Their first album, Metallitotuus, was released in 2005 and has so far sold more than 32,000 copies. Teräsbetoni has been strongly influenced by bands such as Manowar. The direct translation of the band's name is "steel concrete", Finnish for "reinforced concrete".

The music of Teräsbetoni has a martial air to it, with lyrics glorifying a pagan warrior lifestyle and a "brotherhood of metal". The style has received mixed reception. Band members themselves have said that they are not dead serious about the band's mentality and are having fun with it. The most famous songs of the band include "Taivas lyö tulta", "Vaadimme metallia", "Voittamaton" and their Eurovision entry "Missä miehet ratsastaa".

The group announced the interruption of activities in August 2011, and it has remained in hiatus ever since.

== History ==
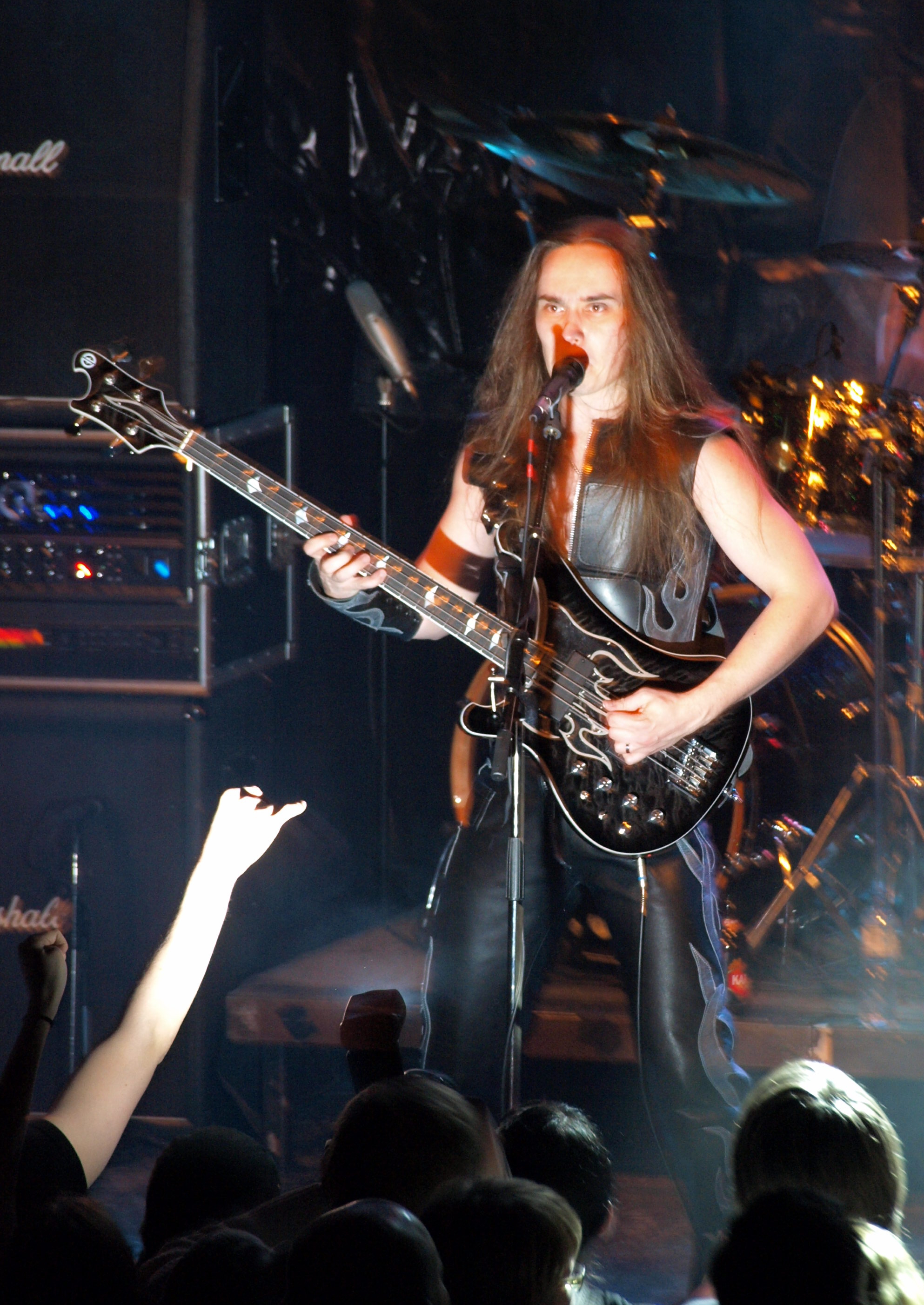
Lead vocalist and bass guitarist Jarkko Ahola

Jarkko Ahola, Arto Järvinen, and Viljo Rantanen met each other in 2002 and decided to form a band. Jari Kuokkanen joined as a part-time drummer, and later became an official member. Rantanen was the one to come up with the name Teräsbetoni. Teräsbetoni made its first songs in 2003. They were published on the band's homepage in the summer of 2003 and were called "Teräsbetoni", "Teräksen varjo" (trans. The Shadow of Steel), and "Maljanne nostakaa" (trans. Raise Your Toast).

The band started to get popular in underground circles and soon the knowledge of the band's existence spread wider. Excited fans circulated a petition, demanding a recording contract for Teräsbetoni, and sent it to several record companies. In 2004, Teräsbetoni performed their first concert and a live version of "Taivas lyö tulta" (trans. The sky strikes down fire) was added to the band's homepage. In their first concerts they used to play cover versions of Ronnie Dio's "Rainbow in the Dark" and Manowar's "Metal Warriors". In late 2004, the band signed a recording contract with Warner Music Finland and the recording for the "Taivas lyö tulta" single started in December 2004. The single was released in February 2005. During its first week on the Finnish single list, it rose to the top, followed by plentiful radio time and the band becoming more widely known.

The recordings for the Metallitotuus album started in January 2005 and the album was released on 6 April 2005. During its first week on the Finnish list, it placed second and stood on the list for 29 weeks. Another single from the album was "Orjatar" ("slave woman"). A music video was also made of this song and it was shown for the first time on the TOP40 show, on 16 April 2005. Taivas lyö tulta was later chosen to be the goal song for the Finnish ice hockey national team A in the Karjala Cup tournament.

Metallitotuus went platinum (in Finland, that means over 30,000 copies have been sold) in the year it was published, with almost 33,000 copies sold, becoming the third most popular heavy rock album in Finland that year. In June 2006, the band's second album, Vaadimme metallia ("we demand metal"), was released. On the day of its release, it nearly broke the gold album line, which in Finland is 15,000 albums sold.

There has been a lot of interest of Teräsbetoni in countries outside Finland, and the band is also very interested in playing outside Finland; so far they have done so only once, at Wacken Open Air 2005. Teräsbetoni competed in the Finnish national preselection for the Eurovision Song Contest 2008. On 1 March, they won the nomination with a total of 38.9% of the final votes cast. They represented Finland with their song "Missä miehet ratsastaa". The band was voted as one of the finalists on 20 May. In the finals on 24 May the entry placed 22nd with 35 points. In the semi-final band placed 8th with 79 points.

On 19 March 2008, Teräsbetoni released their third album, Myrskyntuoja, which entered the Finnish album chart at number one. In 2010, a fourth studio album was released, Maailma tarvitsee sankareita.

In the year following the release of their fourth studio album, the group announced that they would cease band activity. They made it clear that they were not breaking up, but rather taking a break. They did play a show to celebrate their 10-year anniversary in July 2013. They played in Turku, honoring the city that hosted many of their earliest shows. They announced the continuation of the break following the event.

== Members ==
- Jarkko Ahola – lead vocals, bass
- Arto Järvinen – guitars, backing vocals
- Viljo Rantanen – guitars
- Jari Kuokkanen – drums

== Discography ==
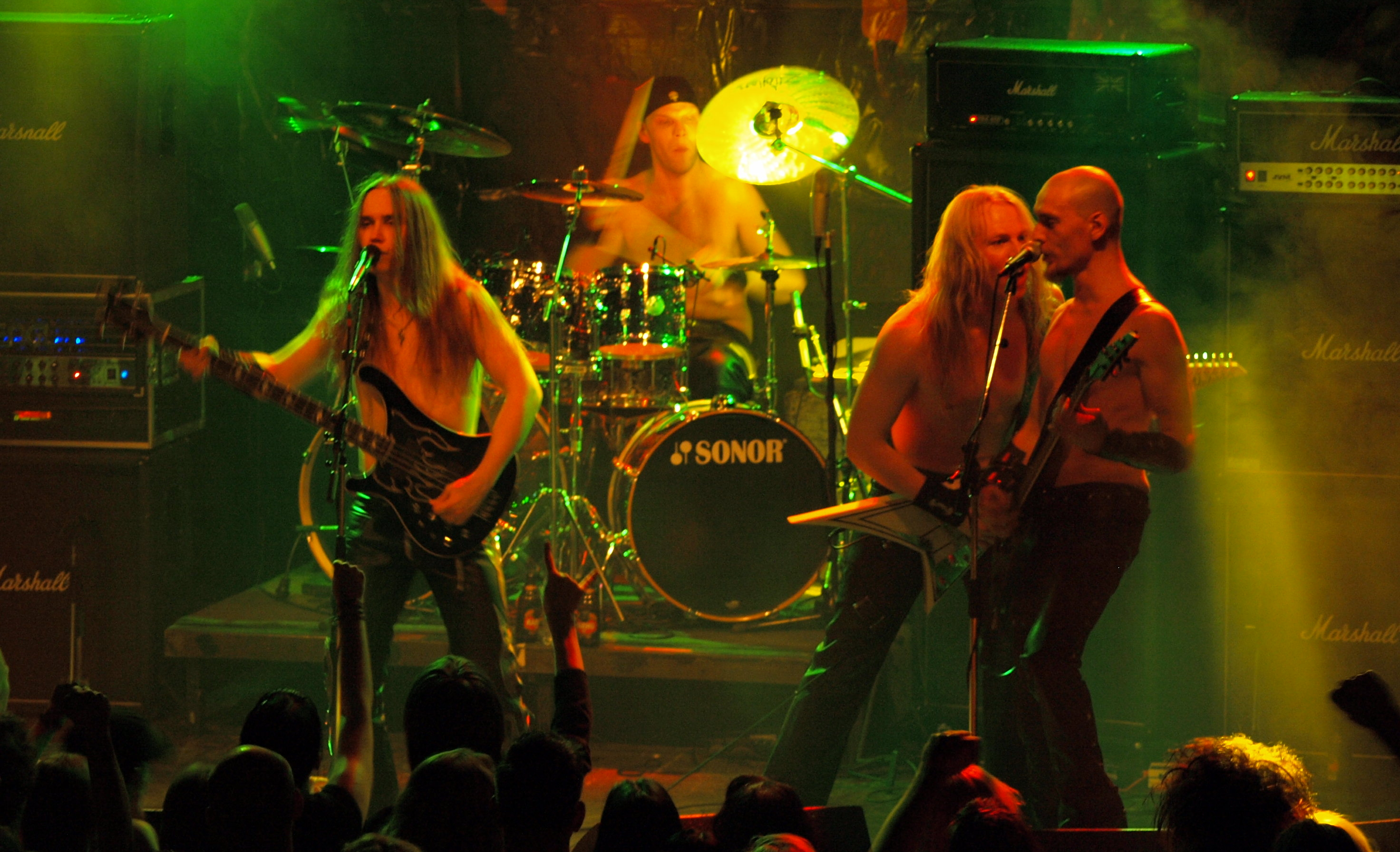
Teräsbetoni performing in 2008

=== Albums ===
- Metallitotuus (2005) No. 2 (FIN)
- Vaadimme metallia (2006) No. 2 (FIN)
- Myrskyntuoja (2008) No. 1 (FIN)
- Maailma tarvitsee sankareita (2010) No. 14 (FIN)

=== Singles ===
- Taivas lyö tulta (2005) No. 1 (FIN)
- Orjatar (2005) No. 10 (FIN)
- Vahva kuin metalli (2005) No. 19 (FIN)
- Älä mene metsään (2006) No. 3 (FIN)
- Viimeinen tuoppi (2006)
- Missä miehet ratsastaa (2008) No. 2 (FIN)
- Paha sanoo (2008) (Promo)

Preceded by Hanna Pakarinen with Leave Me Alone	Finland in the Eurovision Song Contest; 2008	Succeeded by Waldo's People with Lose Control
