= Cheek (rapper) discography =

Cheek discography
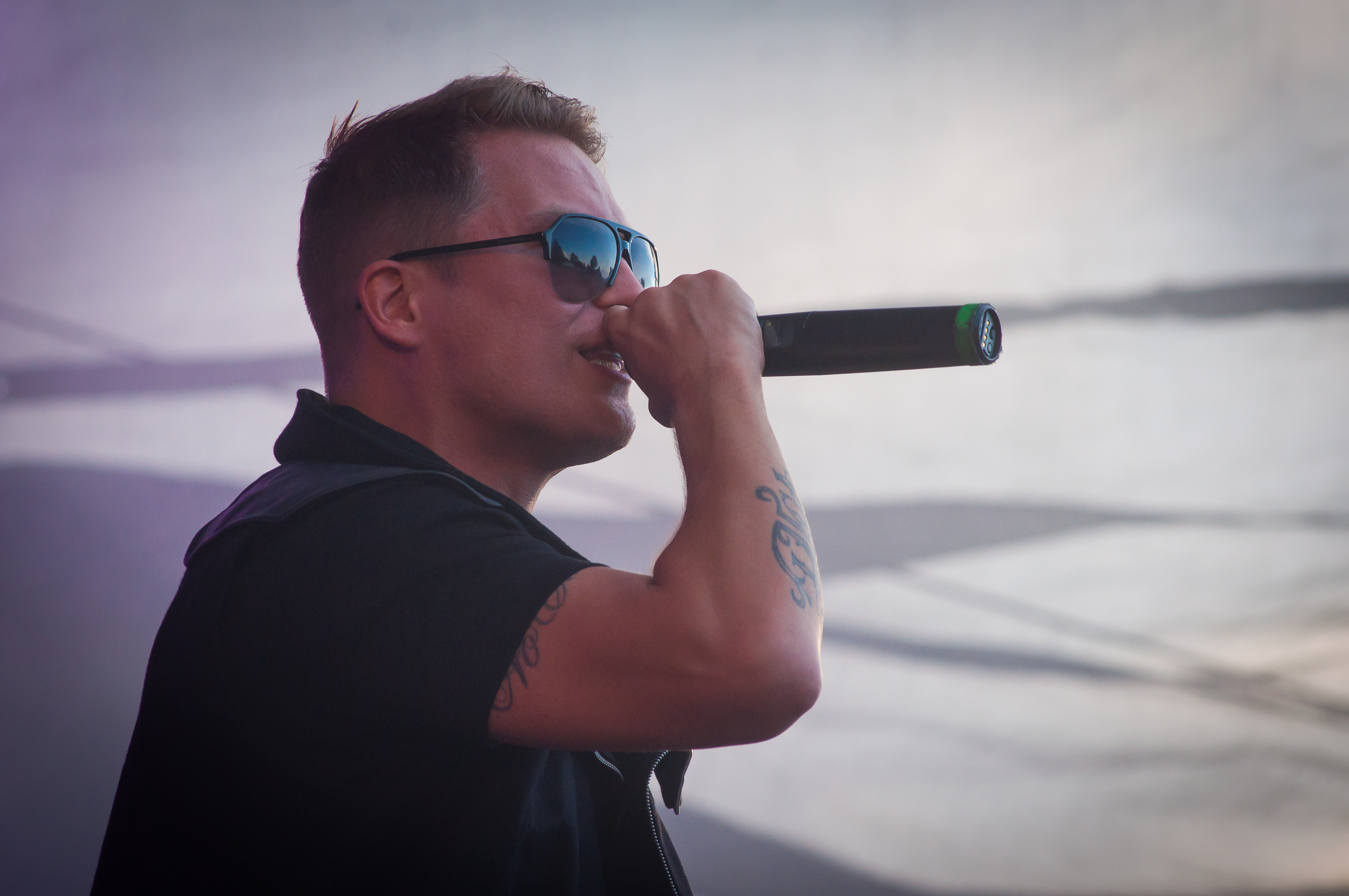
- Cheek in 2014
- Studio albums: 16
- Singles: 25

This article contains the discography of Finnish rapper Cheek and includes information relating to his album and single releases.

== Albums ==
Year	Title	Peak position
Year	Title	FIN
2001	Human & Beast	–
2002	50/50	–
2003	Pitää pystyy elää	–
2004	Avaimet mun kulmille	19
2005	Käännän sivuu	17
2007	Kasvukipuja	19
2008	Kuka sä oot	5
2009	Jare Henrik Tiihonen	1
2010	Jare Henrik Tiihonen 2 (JHT2)	1
2012	Sokka irti	3
2013	Kuka muu muka	1
2014	Kuka muu muka – Stadion Edition	3
2015	Alpha Omega	1
2017	Kävi täällä (with Elastinen as Profeetat)	6
2018	Timantit on ikuisia	1
2019	Valot sammuu	12
2025	Unitas Sigma	1

== DVDs ==
- 2009: Jare Henrik Tiihonen

== Singles ==
Year	Title	Peak position	Album
Year	Title	FIN	Album
2004	"Avaimet mun kiesiin"	6	Avaimet mun kulmille
2004	"Raplaulajan vapaapäivä" (featuring Brädi & Pappa)	6	Avaimet mun kulmille
2004	"Avaimet mun himaan" (featuring Idän Ihme & Tupla-S)	16	Avaimet mun kulmille
2005	"Liiku" (featuring Jonna)	5	Käännän sivuu
2005	"Nostan kytkintä"	13	Käännän sivuu
2005	"Täältä sinne"	–	Käännän sivuu
2007	"Sun täytyy" (featuring Sami Saari)	–	Kasvukipuja
2007	"Tuhlaajapoika" (featuring Tasis)	–	Kasvukipuja
2008	"Liekeissä"	1	Kuka sä oot
2008	"Kanssa tai ilman" (featuring Illi)	–	Kuka sä oot
2009	"Jos mä oisin sä"	1	Jare Henrik Tiihonen
2009	"Mitä tänne jää"	17	Jare Henrik Tiihonen
2010	"Jippikayjei"	1	Jare Henrik Tiihonen 2
2010	"Maanteiden kingi"	–	Jare Henrik Tiihonen 2
2011	"Mikä siinä on" (featuring Jontte)	–	Jare Henrik Tiihonen 2
2012	"Pyrkiny vähentää" (featuring Spekti)	10	Sokka irti
2012	"Sokka irti"	3	Sokka irti
2012	"Syypää sun hymyyn" (featuring Yasmine Yamajako)	2	Sokka irti
2012	"Anna mä meen" (featuring Jonne Aaron)	1	Sokka irti
2013	"Kyyneleet" (featuring Sami Saari)	20	Sokka irti
2013	"Jossu" (featuring Jukka Poika)	1	Kuka muu muka
2013	"Timantit on ikuisia"	1	Kuka muu muka
2014	"Äärirajoille"	6	–
2014	"Flexaa" (featuring Sanni and VilleGalle)	3	–
2015	"Sä huudat"	1	Alpha Omega
2016	"Me ollaan ne, Pt.2" (featuring Nikke Ankara, Elastinen, VilleGalle, Kube, Pete Parkkonen)	1	Timantit on ikuisia
2016	"All Good Everything"	1	Timantit on ikuisia
2016	"Sinuhe" (with Elastinen, as Profeetat)	1	–
2017	"Yhtäccii" (with Elastinen, as Profeetat)	3	–
2017	"Eyo" (with Elastinen, as Profeetat featuring Nelli Matula)	1	–
2017	"Pipefest" (with Elastinen, as Profeetat featuring Paleface)	8	–
2017	"Sinä ansaitset kultaa"	1	–
2017	"Vahinko"	8	–
2017	"Jumala"	2	–
2017	"Malja"	9	–
2017	"Älä lähde vielä pois"	11	–
2017	"Surulapsi"	3	–
2017	"Enkelit"	1	Timantit on ikuisia
2018	"Xtc" (with Lukas Leon and Etta)	1	–

Other charted songs

Year	Title	Peak position	Album
Year	Title	FIN	Album
2012	"Rakastuin mä luuseriin"	12	Vain elämää jatkuu
2012	"Puhelinlangat laulaa"	1	Vain elämää
2012	"Tinakenkätyttö"	4	Vain elämää
2012	"Levoton Tuhkimo"	12	Vain elämää jatkuu
2012	"Kaduilla tuulee"	13	Vain elämää
2013	"Älä pyydä mitään"	8	Kuka muu muka
2013	"Kuka muu muka"	7	Kuka muu muka
2013	"Vihaajat vihaa" (featuring Kalle Kinos)	12	Kuka muu muka
2013	"Fiiliksissä" (featuring Diandra)	12	Kuka muu muka
2013	"Parempi mies" (featuring Samuli Edelmann)	6	Kuka muu muka
2013	"Niille joil on paha olla"	18	Kuka muu muka
2013	"Profeetat" (featuring Elastinen)	20	Kuka muu muka
2015	"Sillat" (featuring Ilta)	1	Alpha Omega
2015	"Alpha Omega"	3	Alpha Omega
2015	"Chekkonen"	4	Alpha Omega
2015	"Keinu"	5	Alpha Omega
2015	"Leveellä" (featuring Herrasmiesliiga & Kapasiteettiyksikkö)	6	Alpha Omega
2015	"Me ollaan ne" (featuring Nikke Ankara)	7	Alpha Omega
2015	"Valot sammuu"	3	Alpha Omega
2015	"Jos sä haluut" (featuring Yasmine Yamajako)	11	Alpha Omega
2015	"Makee ja selkee" (featuring Kasmir)	12	Alpha Omega

Featured in

Year	Title	Peak position	Album
Year	Title	FIN	Album
2011	"Etkot, juhlat, jatkot" (Fintelligens featuring Cheek)	13	Täytyy tuntuu
