= Vain elämää =

- Country of origin: Finland
- Original language: Finnish
- No. of seasons: 15
- No. of episodes: 132

Production
- Executive producers: Anssi Rimpelä and Jaana Besmond (Zodiak); Tatu Ferchen and Kati Parkkonen (Nelonen)
- Producer: Suvi Valkonen
- Running time: 42–95 minutes
- Production company: Zodiak Media

Original release
- Network: Nelonen
- Release: October 5, 2012 – present

Vain elämää is the Finnish version of The Best Singers series broadcast on Finnish Nelonen commercial television channel fashioned on the successful Dutch series De beste zangers van Nederland. Each day, one artist would be chosen, and the remaining artists would perform covers of their songs and would be assessed by the original artist. The last day would be dedicated to duets of the most popular performances.

The title of the Finnish series is inspired by the 1973 song Vain elämää ("It's only life") by Irwin Goodman.

== Summary ==
Season	# of episodes	First episode	Last episode	Participants
1	8	5 October 2012	23 November 2012	Jari Sillanpää, Katri Helena, Cheek, Kaija Koo, Erin, Jonne Aaron, Neumann
2	8	4 October 2013	22 November 2013	Anna Abreu, Laura Närhi, Maarit Hurmerinta, Ilkka Alanko, Jukka Poika, Juha Tapio, Pauli Hanhiniemi
3	8	19 September 2014	7 November 2014	Vesa-Matti Loiri, Jenni Vartiainen, Paula Vesala, Paula Koivuniemi, Elastinen, Samuli Edelmann, Toni Wirtanen
4	8	18 September 2015	6 November 2015	Antti Tuisku, Virve Rosti, Anssi Kela, Maija Vilkkumaa, VilleGalle, Sanni, Pave Maijanen
5	9	16 September 2016	11 November 2016	Hector, Suvi Teräsniska, Chisu, Lauri Tähkä, Anna Puu, Mikael Gabriel, Mikko Kuustonen
6	16	21 April 2017	10 June 2017	Nikke Ankara, Laura Voutilainen, Irina, Robin, Petra, Olli Lindholm, Samu Haber
7	10	1 September 2017	3 November 2017	Toni Wirtanen, Jari Sillanpää, Jenni Vartiainen, Sanni, Kaija Koo, Cheek, Juha Tapio
8	15	27 April 2018	15 June 2018	Danny, Arttu Wiskari, Terhi Kokkonen, Mira Luoti, Kasmir, Aki Tykki, Sani
9	10	31 August 2018	2 November 2018	Pepe Willberg, Pyhimys, Evelina, Tuure Kilpeläinen, Anne Mattila, Ellinoora, Lauri Ylönen
10	14	30 August 2019	29 November 2019	Antti Tuisku, Elastinen, Erin, Lauri Tähkä, Maija Vilkkumaa, Vesala, VilleGalle, Samu Haber
11	12	3 October 2020	19 December 2020	Ressu Redford, Jannika B, Reino Nordin, Arja Koriseva, Stig, Vesa Jokinen, Mariska, Herra Ylppö
12	13	24 September 2021	17 December 2021	Tuure Kilpeläinen, Arttu Wiskari, Anna Abreu, Jukka Poika, Suvi Teräsniska, Pyhimys, Chisu, Anssi Kela
13	13	9 September 2022	16 December 2022	Mikko Alatalo, Erika Vikman, Jyrki 69, Tommi Läntinen, Redrama, Yona, Pete Parkkonen
14	15	8 September 2023	15 December 2023	Ellinoora, Anna Puu, Janna Hurmerinta, Hätä-Miikka, Robin Packalen, Virve Rosti, A.W. Yrjänä, Jouni Hynynen
15	16	6 September 2024	20 December 2024	Marko Hietala, Hanna Pakarinen, Ilta, Jussi Rainio, Roope Salminen, Costello Hautamäki, Eini, Waldo, Katri Helena, Hector
16	16	6 September 2025	19 December 2025	Johannes Brotherus, VIIVI, Käärijä, Vesta, Lauri Haav, Jonna Tervomaa, Pelle Miljoona, Mikki Kauste
17	Ongoing	4 September 2026	Scheduled for 18 December 2026	Bess, Freeman, Heikki Salo, Ares (singer), Nelli Matula, Benjamin, Jippu, Timo Kotipelto (with Nylon Beat), Mr. Lordi, Samuli Putro

== Season 1 (2012) ==
The first Finnish edition started on 5 October 2012 and continued until 23 November 2012. The artists taking part were Erin, Kaija Koo, Katri Helena, Jonne Aaron, Cheek, Neumann and Jari Sillanpää.

Many of the renditions during the series have charted on the Finnish Singles Chart and the self-titled compilation album has topped the Finnish Albums Chart.

=== Performances ===
Day	Date broadcast	Ratings	Featured artist	Performance(s)
1.	5 October 2012	569,000	Jari Sillanpää	"Kaduilla tuulee" (Cheek) "Unta en saa" (Erin) "Pariisi-Helsinki" (Kaija Koo) "Bum Bum Bum" (Neumann) "Valkeaa unelmaa" (Katri Helena) "Satulinna" (Jonne Aaron)
2.	12 October 2012	555,000	Erin	"Teflon love" (Jari Sillanpää) "Satasen laina" (Neumann) "Vanha sydän" (Kaija Koo) "Rakastuin mä looseriin" (Cheek) "Syytön" (Jonne Aaron) "Vanha nainen hunningolla" (Katri Helena)
3.	19 October 2012	694,000	Neumann	"Nahkatakkinen tyttö" (Erin) "Autiotalo" (Katri Helena) "Rio Ohoi" (Jonne Aaron) "Mennään hiljaa markkinoille" (Kaija Koo) "Levoton Tuhkimo" (Cheek) "Sinä ja minä" (Jari Sillanpää)
4.	26 October 2012	849,000	Cheek	"Jos mä oisin sä" (Katri Helena) "Tuhlaajapoika" (Neumann) "Jippikayjei" (Jonne Aaron) "Liekeissä" (Jari Sillanpää) "Mitä tänne jää" (Erin) "Mikä siinä on" (Kaija Koo)
5.	2 November 2012	716,000	Kaija Koo	"Tinakenkätyttö" (Cheek) "Tuulikello" (Neumann) "Kylmä ilman sua" (Jonne Aaron) "Vapaa" (Erin) "Kuka keksi rakkauden" (Katri Helena) "Kaunis rietas onnellinen" (Jari Sillanpää)
6.	9 November 2012	635,000	Jonne Aaron	"Moment of Our Love" (Neumann) "Won't Let Go" (Kaija Koo) "Jos menet pois" (Erin) "Jealous Sky" (Jari Sillanpää) "Giving Up!" (Cheek) "Still Alive (Elossa taas)" (Katri Helena)
7.	16 November 2012	911,000	Katri Helena	"Katson sineen taivaan" (Kaija Koo) "Lintu ja lapsi" (Jonne Aaron) "Puhelinlangat laulaa" (Cheek) "Vasten auringon siltaa" (Erin) "Anna mulle tähtitaivas" (Neumann) "Nuoruus on seikkailu" (Jari Sillanpää)
8.	23 November 2012	825,000	Duets day	"Kaihonkukkia" (Katri Helena & Erin) "En se olla saa" (Jari Sillanpää & Cheek) "Minun tuulessa soi" (Kaija Koo & Neumann) "Perjantai" (Neumann & Jonne Aaron) "Syypää sun hymyyn" (Cheek & Kaija Koo) "Popeda" (Erin & Jari Sillanpää) "Believe" (Jonne Aaron & Katri Helena)

=== Albums ===
==== Vain elämää ====
At the end of the series, a compilation album Vain elämää was released WEA / Warner Music containing 21 tracks. The album topped the Finnish Albums Chart and was certified double platinum.

===== Track listing =====
1. Katri Helena – "Jos mä oisin sä"
2. Cheek – "Tinakenkätyttö"
3. Neumann – "Bum bum bum"
4. Jonne Aaron – "Satulinna"
5. Kaija Koo – "Vanha sydän"
6. Jari Sillanpää – "Sinä ja minä"
7. Erin – "Vasten auringon siltaa"
8. Cheek – "Kaduilla tuulee"
9. Neumann – "The Moment of Our Love"
10. Katri Helena – "Vanha nainen hunningolla"
11. Erin – "Vapaa"
12. Jonne Aaron – "Syytön"
13. Kaija Koo – "Mennään hiljaa markkinoille"
14. Jari Sillanpää – "Liekeissä"
15. Cheek – "Puhelinlangat laulaa"
16. Katri Helena – "Autiotalo"
17. Jari Sillanpää – "Nuoruus on seikkailu"
18. Kaija Koo – "Won't Let Go"
19. Jonne Aaron – "Kylmä ilman sua"
20. Erin – "Nahkatakkinen tyttö"
21. Neumann – "Anna mulle tähtitaivas"

==== Vain elämää jatkuu ====
Due to its popularity, a new compilation album was released on 21 December 2012 titled Vain elämää jatkuu (meaning Vain elämää continues) WEA / Warner Music. The album topped the Finnish Albums Chart. It has also gone double platinum on advance orders.

===== Track listing =====
1. Katri Helena – "Kuka keksi rakkauden"
2. Kaija Koo – "Katson sineen taivaan"
3. Jonne Aaron – "Lintu ja lapsi"
4. Jari Sillanpää – "Jealous Sky"
5. Erin – "Unta en saa"
6. Neumann – "Satasen laina"
7. Cheek – "Levoton Tuhkimo"
8. Kaija Koo – "Mikä siinä on"
9. Jonne Aaron – "Rio Ohoi"
10. Katri Helena – "Olen elossa taas"
11. Neumann – "Tuhlaajapoika"
12. Erin – "Jos menet pois"
13. Jari Sillanpää – "Teflon love"
14. Kaija Koo – "Pariisi – Helsinki"
15. Cheek – "Giving Up!"
16. Katri Helena – "Valkeaa unelmaa"
17. Erin – "Mitä tänne jää"
18. Jari Sillanpää – "Kaunis rietas onnellinen"
19. Jonne Aaron – "Jippikayjei"
20. Cheek – "Rakastuin mä looseriin"
21. Neumann – "Tuulikello"

== Season 2 (2013) ==
Nelonen confirmed a second season, scheduled for autumn 2013. It ran from 4 October to 22 November 2013 with repeats and live performances from 5 October to 23 November 2013. The artists participating in the second season were Maarit Hurmerinta, Laura Närhi, Anna Abreu, Ilkka Alanko, Jukka Poika, Juha Tapio and Pauli Hanhiniemi.

=== Performances ===
Day	Date originally broadcast	Dates repeated	Ratings	Featured artist	Performance(s)
1.	4 October 2013	5 October 2013 (Nelonen); 23 November 2013 (Liv)	726,000	Ilkka Alanko	"Poplaulajan vapaapäivä" (Anna Abreu) "Tie ajatuksiin" (Laura Närhi) "Elän vain kerran" (Pauli Hanhiniemi) "Kullanhuuhtoja" (Maarit Hurmerinta) "Juppihippipunkkari" (Jukka Poika) "Luotsivene" (Juha Tapio)
2.	11 October 2013	12 October 2013 (Nelonen); 23 November 2013 (Liv)	737,000	Laura Närhi	"Kuutamolla (se ei mee pois)" (Pauli Hanhiniemi) "Tämä on totta" (Ilkka Alanko) "Siskoni" (Maarit Hurmerinta) "Child Is My Name" (Juha Tapio) "Mä annan sut pois" (Anna Abreu) "Tuhlari" (Jukka Poika)
3.	18 October 2013	19 October 2013 (Nelonen); 23 November 2013 (Liv)	788,000	Jukka Poika	"Mielihyvää" (Maarit Hurmerinta) "Taistelun arvoinen" (Ilkka Alanko) "Kylmästä lämpimään" (Anna Abreu) "Älä tyri nyt" (Juha Tapio) "Silkkii" (Laura Närhi) "Siideripissis" (Pauli Hanhiniemi)
4.	25 October 2013	26 October 2013 (Nelonen); 23 November 2013 (Liv)	863,000	Anna Abreu	"Vinegar" (Maarit Hurmerinta) "Music Everywhere" (Juha Tapio) "End of Love" (Pauli Hanhiniemi) "Stereo" (Ilkka Alanko) "Be with You" (Laura Närhi) "Worst Part Is Over" (Jukka Poika)
5.	1 November 2013	2 November 2013 (Nelonen); 24 November 2013 (Liv)	829,000	Juha Tapio	"En mitään, en ketään" (Laura Närhi) "Sitkeä sydän" (Ilkka Alanko) "Mitä silmät ei nää" (Jukka Poika) "Ohikiitävää" (Anna Abreu) "Minä olen, sinä olet" (Pauli Hanhiniemi) "Kaksi puuta" (Maarit Hurmerinta)
6.	8 November 2013	9 November 2013 (Nelonen); 24 November 2013 (Liv)	680,000	Maarit Hurmerinta	"Laakson lilja" (Pauli Hanhiniemi) "Hymypoika" (Laura Närhi) "Neito ja ylioppilas" (Ilkka Alanko) "Lainaa vain" (Juha Tapio) "Jäätelökesä" (Jukka Poika) "Jos tahdot tietää" (Anna Abreu)
7.	15 November 2013	16 November 2013 (Nelonen); 24 November 2013 (Liv)	783,000	Pauli Hanhiniemi	"Äiti pojastaan pappia toivoi" (Ilkka Alanko) "Hyvää ja kaunista" (Juha Tapio) "Lautalla" (Jukka Poika) "'Tästä asti aikaa" (Maarit Hurmerinta) "Valehtelisin jos väittäisin" (Anna Abreu) "Siipeen jos sain" (Laura Närhi)
8.	22 November 2013	23 November 2013 (Nelonen); 24 November 2013 (Liv)	645,000	Duets day	"Viestii" (Jukka Poika & Juha Tapio) "Joidenkin kaa" (Maarit & Anna Abreu) "Pyörteeseen" (Pauli Hanhiniemi & Laura Närhi) "Hetken tie on kevyt" (Laura Närhi & Maarit) "Seitsemän päivää selvinpäin" (Ilkka Alanko & Pauli Hanhiniemi) "Feels Like Freedom" (Anna Abreu & Jukka Poika) "Anna pois itkuista puolet" (Juha Tapio & Ilkka Alanko)

=== Albums ===
==== Vain elämää – Kausi 2 ====
At the end of the series 2, a compilation album Vain elämää – Kausi 2 was released WEA / Warner Music containing 21 tracks. The album topped the Finnish Albums Chart.

==== Vain elämää – Kausi 2 jatkuu ====
Due to its popularity, a new compilation album was released in December 2013 titled Vain elämää – Kausi 2 jatkuu (meaning Vain elämää season 2 continues) on WEA / Warner Music. The album reached number 2 on the Finnish Albums Chart.

== Season 3 (2014) ==
Nelonen ran a third season that aired from 19 September to 7 November 2014. The artists participating in the third season are Samuli Edelmann, Elastinen, Paula Koivuniemi, Vesa-Matti Loiri, Jenni Vartiainen, Paula Vesala and Toni Wirtanen.

=== Performances ===
Day	Date broadcast	Date repeated	Ratings	Featured artist	Päivän artisti
1.	19 September 2014	21 September 2014	979,000	Vesa-Matti Loiri	"Naurava kulkuri" (Elastinen) "Lapin kesä" (Paula Koivuniemi) "Brontosauruksen yö" (Toni Wirtanen) "Väliaikainen" (Samuli Edelmann) "Elegia" (Paula Vesala) "Kohtalokas samba" (Jenni Vartiainen)
2.	26 September 2014	28 September 2014	967,000	Paula Vesala	"Päiväkoti" (Samuli Edelmann) "Kovemmat kädet" (Toni Wirtanen) "Lautturi" (Jenni Vartiainen) "Rusketusraidat" (Vesa-Matti Loiri) "Joutsenet" (Paula Koivuniemi) "Oo siellä jossain mun" (Elastinen)
3.	3 October 2014	5 October 2014	980,000	Toni Wirtanen	"Koneeseen" (Paula Koivuniemi) "Mitä kuuluu" (Elastinen) "Pahempi toistaan" (Paula Vesala) "Anna mulle piiskaa" (Jenni Vartiainen) "Teit meistä kauniin" (Samuli Edelmann) "Armo" (Vesa-Matti Loiri)
4.	10 October 2014	12 October 2014	959,000	Jenni Vartiainen	"Ihmisten edessä" (Vesa-Matti Loiri) "Minä ja hän" (Elastinen) "Tunnoton" (Samuli Edelmann) "Kiittämätön" (Paula Vesala) "En haluu kuolla tänä yönä" (Toni Wirtanen) "Missä muruseni on" (Paula Koivuniemi)
5.	17 October 2014	19 October 2014	853,000	Elastinen	"Mikä boogie" (Paula Koivuniemi) "Heruuks?" (Jenni Vartiainen) "Vaan sil on väliä" (Samuli Edelmann) "Anna soida" (Vesa-Matti Loiri) "Syljen" (Toni Wirtanen) "Sori" (Paula Vesala)
6.	24 October 2014	26 October 2014	875,000	Samuli Edelmann	"Ei mitään hätää" (Toni Wirtanen) "Peggy" (Elastinen) "Armaan läheisyys" (Vesa-Matti Loiri) "(Sinä olet) Aurinko" (Jenni Vartiainen) "Sininen sointu" (Paula Koivuniemi) "Miten ja miksi" (Paula Vesala)
7.	31 October 2014	2 November 2014	880,000	Paula Koivuniemi	"Aikuinen nainen" (Vesa-Matti Loiri) "Sua vasten aina painautuisin" (Paula Vesala) "Luotan sydämen ääneen" (Jenni Vartiainen) "Sata kesää, tuhat yötä" (Toni Wirtanen) "Kun kuuntelen Tomppaa (kuuntelen Paulaa)" (Elastinen) "Kuuleeko yö" (Samuli Edelmann)
8.	7 November 2014	9 November 2014	646,000	Duets day	"Tuomittuna kulkemaan" (Vesa-Matti Loiri & Paula Vesala) "Aggressio" (Toni Wirtanen & Elastinen) "Sonetti 18" (Samuli Edelmann & Jenni Vartiainen) "Tummat silmät, ruskea tukka" (Paula Koivuniemi & Vesa-Matti Loiri) "Rakkauslaulu" (Paula Vesala & Samuli Edelmann) "Selvästi päihtynyt" (Jenni Vartiainen & Toni Wirtanen) "Hallussa" (Elastinen & Paula Koivuniemi)

== Season 4 (2015) ==
A fourth season began on Nelonen on 18 September 2015. The artists participating in the fourth season are Vicky Rosti, VilleGalle, Maija Vilkkumaa, Anssi Kela, Sanni, Pave Maijanen and Antti Tuisku.

=== Performances ===
Day	Date broadcast	Ratings	Featured artist	Performance(s)
1.	18 September 2015	706,000	Vicky Rosti	"Menolippu" (VilleGalle) "Näinkö aina meille täällä käy" (Maija Vilkkumaa) "Charlie Brown" (Pave Maijanen) "Sata salamaa" (Antti Tuisku) "Avara luonto" (Anssi Kela) "Oon voimissain" (Sanni)
2.	25 September 2015	623,000	VilleGalle	"Huominen on huomenna" (Vicky Rosti) "Mäissä" (Antti Tuisku) "Kran Turismo" (Sanni) "Nelisilmä" (Maija Vilkkumaa) "Seisarin lapsi" (Anssi Kela) "Voitolla yöhön" (Pave Maijanen)
3.	2 October 2015	613,000	Maija Vilkkumaa	"Satumaa-tango" (Pave Maijanen) "Ingalsin Laura" (Virve Rosti) "Lottovoitto" (Antti Tuisku) "Ei" (Sanni) "Totuutta ja tehtävää" (VilleGalle) "Luokkakokous" (Anssi Kela)
4.	9 October 2015	741,000	Antti Tuisku	"Peto on irti" (VilleGalle) "Vaarallinen" (Anssi Kela) "Tyhjä huone" (Maija Vilkkumaa) "Sekaisin" (Pave Maijanen) "Yksinäinen" (Sanni) "Hyökyaalto" (Virve Rosti)
5.	16 October 2015	720,000	Anssi Kela	"Milla" (Pave Maijanen) "Kaksi sisarta" (Antti Tuisku) "Nostalgiaa" (Virve Rosti) "Puistossa" (VilleGalle + Jare & Alexandra Babitzin) "Levoton tyttö" (Sanni) "1972" (Maija Vilkkumaa)
6.	23 October 2015	720,000	Sanni	"2080-luvulla" (Anssi Kela) "Prinsessoja ja astronautteja" (VilleGalle) "Jos mä oon oikee" (Virve Rosti) "Sotke mut" (Maija Vilkkumaa) "Me ei olla enää me" (Pave Maijanen) "Pojat" (Antti Tuisku)
7.	30 October 2015	643,000	Pave Maijanen	"Jano" (Maija Vilkkumaa) "I'm Gonna Roll" (Virve Rosti) "Ikävä" (Anssi Kela) "Elämän nälkä" (Antti Tuisku) "Pidä huolta" (Sanni) "Lähtisitkö" (VilleGalle & Sanni)
8.	6 November 2015	479,000	Duets day	"Kun Chicago kuoli" (Virve Rosti & Antti Tuisku) "Supernova" (Sanni & Maija Vilkkumaa) "Joki ja meri" (Pave Maijanen & Virve Rosti) "Lissu ja mä" (Maija Vilkkumaa & Anssi Kela) "Keinutaan" (Antti Tuisku & VilleGalle) "Piirrä minuun tie" (Anssi Kela & Sanni) "Etenee" (VilleGalle & Pave Maijanen)
