= List of number-one singles of 2013 (Finland) =

This is the complete list of (physical and digital) number-one singles sold in Finland in 2013 according to the Official Finnish Charts. The list on the left side of the box (Suomen virallinen singlelista, "the Official Finnish Singles Chart") represents physical and digital track sales as well as music streaming, the one in the middle (Suomen virallinen latauslista, "the Official Finnish Download Chart") represents sales of digital tracks and the one on the right side (Suomen virallinen radiosoittolista, "the Official Finnish Airplay Chart") represents airplay (beginning at week 47 of 2013).

== Chart history ==
Official Finnish Singles Chart				Official Finnish Download Chart				Official Finnish Airplay Chart			
Issue date	Song	Artist(s)	Reference(s)	Issue date	Song	Artist(s)	Reference(s)	Issue date	Song	Artist(s)	Reference(s)
Week 1 (January 1)	"Scream & Shout"	will.i.am (featuring Britney Spears)		Week 1	"Mitä tänne jää"	Erin		Week 1	N/A		
Week 2 (January 8)	"Scream & Shout"	will.i.am (featuring Britney Spears)		Week 2	"Mennyt mies"	J. Karjalainen		Week 2	N/A		
Week 3 (January 15)	"Scream & Shout"	will.i.am (featuring Britney Spears)		Week 3	"Mennyt mies"	J. Karjalainen		Week 3	N/A		
Week 4 (January 22)	"Scream & Shout"	will.i.am (featuring Britney Spears)		Week 4	"Mennyt mies"	J. Karjalainen		Week 4	N/A		
Week 5 (January 29)	"Scream & Shout"	will.i.am (featuring Britney Spears)		Week 5	"Mennyt mies"	J. Karjalainen		Week 5	N/A		
Week 6 (February 5)	"Thrift Shop"	Macklemore and Ryan Lewis (featuring Wanz)		Week 6	"Mennyt mies"	J. Karjalainen		Week 6	N/A		
Week 7 (February 12)	"Thrift Shop"	Macklemore and Ryan Lewis (featuring Wanz)		Week 7	"Mennyt mies"	J. Karjalainen		Week 7	N/A		
Week 8 (February 19)	"Thrift Shop"	Macklemore and Ryan Lewis (featuring Wanz)		Week 8	"One Way or Another (Teenage Kicks)"	One Direction		Week 8	N/A		
Week 9 (February 26)	"Thrift Shop"	Macklemore and Ryan Lewis (featuring Wanz)		Week 9 (Note: Both songs were ranked as number one.)	"Mennyt mies"	J. Karjalainen		Week 9	N/A		
Week 9 (February 26)	"Thrift Shop"	Macklemore and Ryan Lewis (featuring Wanz)		Week 9	"Vapaus käteen jää"	Haloo Helsinki!		Week 9	N/A		
Week 10 (March 6)	"Thrift Shop"	Macklemore and Ryan Lewis (featuring Wanz)		Week 10	"Mennyt mies"	J. Karjalainen		Week 10	N/A		
Week 11 (March 13)	"Thrift Shop"	Macklemore and Ryan Lewis (featuring Wanz)		Week 11	"Thrift Shop"	Macklemore and Ryan Lewis (featuring Wanz)		Week 11	N/A		
Week 12 (March 20)	"Thrift Shop"	Macklemore and Ryan Lewis (featuring Wanz)		Week 12	"Mennyt mies"	J. Karjalainen		Week 12	N/A		
Week 13 (March 27)	"Let Her Go"	Passenger		Week 13	"She Makes Me Go"	Arash (featuring Sean Paul)		Week 13	N/A		
Week 14 (April 3)	"Thrift Shop"	Macklemore and Ryan Lewis (featuring Wanz)		Week 14	"Vapaus käteen jää"	Haloo Helsinki!		Week 14	N/A		
Week 15 (April 10)	"Let Her Go"	Passenger		Week 15	"Vapaus käteen jää"	Haloo Helsinki!		Week 15	N/A		
Week 16 (April 17)	"Let Her Go"	Passenger		Week 16	"Back Beat"	The Winyls		Week 16	N/A		
Week 17 (April 24)	"Let Her Go"	Passenger		Week 17	"Get Lucky"	Daft Punk (featuring Pharrell Williams)		Week 17	N/A		
Week 18 (May 1)	"New Way Home"	Isac Elliot		Week 18	"Gentleman"	PSY		Week 18	N/A		
Week 19 (May 8)	"New Way Home"	Isac Elliot		Week 19	"Levikset repee"	Sini Sabotage (featuring VilleGalle)		Week 19	N/A		
Week 20 (May 15)	"Levikset repee"	Sini Sabotage (featuring VilleGalle)		Week 20	"Back Beat"	The Winyls		Week 20	N/A		
Week 21 (May 22)	"Levikset repee"	Sini Sabotage (featuring VilleGalle)		Week 21	"Only Teardrops"	Emmelie de Forest		Week 21	N/A		
Week 22 (May 29)	"Levikset repee"	Sini Sabotage (featuring VilleGalle)		Week 22	"Levikset repee"	Sini Sabotage (featuring VilleGalle)		Week 22	N/A		
Week 23 (June 5)	"Levikset repee"	Sini Sabotage (featuring VilleGalle)		Week 23	"Jossu"	Cheek (featuring Jukka Poika)		Week 23	N/A		
Week 24 (June 12)	"Jossu"	Cheek (featuring Jukka Poika)		Week 24	"Jossu"	Cheek (featuring Jukka Poika)		Week 24	N/A		
Week 25 (June 19)	"Jossu"	Cheek (featuring Jukka Poika)		Week 25	"Jossu"	Cheek (featuring Jukka Poika)		Week 25	N/A		
Week 26 (June 26)	"Sirkuskoira"	Mikko Sipola		Week 26	"Levikset repee"	Sini Sabotage (featuring VilleGalle)		Week 26	N/A		
Week 27 (July 3)	"Jossu"	Cheek (featuring Jukka Poika)		Week 27	"Wake Me Up!"	Avicii		Week 27	N/A		
Week 28 (July 10)	"Wake Me Up!"	Avicii		Week 28	"Wake Me Up!"	Avicii		Week 28	N/A		
Week 29 (July 17)	"Wake Me Up!"	Avicii		Week 29	"Wake Me Up!"	Avicii		Week 29	N/A		
Week 30 (July 24)	"Wake Me Up!"	Avicii		Week 30	"Wake Me Up!"	Avicii		Week 30	N/A		
Week 31 (July 31)	"Wake Me Up!"	Avicii		Week 31	"Wake Me Up!"	Avicii		Week 31	N/A		
Week 32 (August 7)	"Wake Me Up!"	Avicii		Week 32	"Wake Me Up!"	Avicii		Week 32	N/A		
Week 33 (August 14)	"Timantit on ikuisia"	Cheek		Week 33	"Timantit on ikuisia"	Cheek		Week 33	N/A		
Week 34 (August 21)	"Timantit on ikuisia"	Cheek		Week 34	"Timantit on ikuisia"	Cheek		Week 34	N/A		
Week 35 (August 28)	"Timantit on ikuisia"	Cheek		Week 35	"Timantit on ikuisia"	Cheek		Week 35	N/A		
Week 36 (September 4)	"Timantit on ikuisia"	Cheek		Week 36	"Timantit on ikuisia"	Cheek		Week 36	N/A		
Week 37 (September 11)	"Timantit on ikuisia"	Cheek		Week 37	"Timantit on ikuisia"	Cheek		Week 37	N/A		
Week 38 (September 18)	"Salil eka salil vika"	Musta Barbaari		Week 38	"Timantit on ikuisia"	Cheek		Week 38	N/A		
Week 39 (September 25)	"Timantit on ikuisia"	Cheek		Week 39	"Timantit on ikuisia"	Cheek		Week 39	N/A		
Week 40 (October 2)	"Timantit on ikuisia"	Cheek		Week 40	"Timantit on ikuisia"	Cheek		Week 40	N/A		
Week 41 (October 9)	"Timantit on ikuisia"	Cheek		Week 41	"Heartbreaker"	Justin Bieber		Week 41	N/A		
Week 42 (October 16)	"Timantit on ikuisia"	Cheek		Week 42	"All That Matters"	Justin Bieber		Week 42	N/A		
Week 43 (October 23)	"Erilaiset"	Robin		Week 43	"Hold Tight"	Justin Bieber		Week 43	N/A		
Week 44 (October 30)	"Hey Brother"	Avicii		Week 44	"Story of My Life"	One Direction		Week 44	N/A		
Week 45 (November 6)	"Hey Brother"	Avicii		Week 45	"The Monster"	Eminem (featuring Rihanna)		Week 45	N/A		
Week 46 (November 13)	"The Monster"	Eminem (featuring Rihanna)		Week 46	"Hey Brother"	Avicii		Week 46	N/A		
Week 47 (November 20)	"The Monster"	Eminem (featuring Rihanna)		Week 47	"Diana"	One Direction		Week 47	"Parempi mies"	Cheek (featuring Samuli Edelmann)	
Week 48 (November 27)	"The Monster"	Eminem (featuring Rihanna)		Week 48	"Strong"	One Direction		Week 48	"Parempi mies"	Cheek (featuring Samuli Edelmann)	
Week 49 (December 4)	"The Monster"	Eminem (featuring Rihanna)		Week 49	"Kylmästä lämpimään"	Anna Abreu		Week 49	"Parempi mies"	Cheek (featuring Samuli Edelmann)	
Week 50 (December 11)	"The Monster"	Eminem (featuring Rihanna)		Week 50	"Kylmästä lämpimään"	Anna Abreu		Week 50	"Parempi mies"	Cheek (featuring Samuli Edelmann)	
Week 51 (December 18)	"The Monster"	Eminem (featuring Rihanna)		Week 51	"Kylmästä lämpimään"	Anna Abreu		Week 51	"Parempi mies"	Cheek (featuring Samuli Edelmann)	
Week 52 (December 25)	"The Monster"	Eminem (featuring Rihanna)		Week 52	"Hey Brother"	Avicii		Week 52	"Parempi mies"	Cheek (featuring Samuli Edelmann)	

== See also ==
- List of number-one albums of 2013 (Finland)
