= List of number-one albums of 2013 (Finland) =

This is the complete list of (physical and digital) number-one albums sold in Finland in 2013 according to the Official Finnish Charts compiled by Musiikkituottajat – IFPI Finland.

== Chart history ==
Physical & digital albums
| Week | Album | Artist(s) | Reference(s) |
|---|---|---|---|
| Week 1 | Vain elämää jatkuu | Various artists | |
| Week 2 | Vain elämää jatkuu | Various artists | |
| Week 3 | Vain elämää jatkuu | Various artists | |
| Week 4 | Vain elämää jatkuu | Various artists | |
| Week 5 | Vain elämää jatkuu | Various artists | |
| Week 6 | Vain elämää jatkuu | Various artists | |
| Week 7 | Hän tanssi kanssa enkeleiden | Suvi Teräsniska | |
| Week 8 | Hän tanssi kanssa enkeleiden | Suvi Teräsniska | |
| Week 9 | Seitsentahokas | CMX | |
| Week 10 | Maailmanlopun sushibaari | Ismo Alanko | |
| Week 11 | The Next Day | David Bowie | |
| Week 12 | Et ole yksin | J. Karjalainen | |
| Week 13 | Et ole yksin | J. Karjalainen | |
| Week 14 | Et ole yksin | J. Karjalainen | |
| Week 15 | Et ole yksin | J. Karjalainen | |
| Week 16 | Et ole yksin | J. Karjalainen | |
| Week 17 | Circle | Amorphis | |
| Week 18 | Onnen vuodet | Jonne Aaron | |
| Week 19 | Onnen vuodet | Jonne Aaron | |
| Week 20 | Onnen vuodet | Jonne Aaron | |
| Week 21 | Random Access Memories | Daft Punk | |
| Week 22 | Wake Up World | Isac Elliot | |
| Week 23 | Wake Up World | Isac Elliot | |
| Week 24 | Sä osaat! | Erin | |
| Week 25 | Sä osaat! | Erin | |
| Week 26 | Sä osaat! | Erin | |
| Week 27 | Sä osaat! | Erin | |
| Week 28 | Maailmanloppu | Kotiteollisuus | |
| Week 29 | Sä osaat! | Erin | |
| Week 30 | Sä osaat! | Erin | |
| Week 31 | Sä osaat! | Erin | |
| Week 32 | Maailma on tehty meitä varten | Haloo Helsinki! | |
| Week 33 | Sä osaat! | Erin | |
| Week 34 | Maailma on tehty meitä varten | Haloo Helsinki! | |
| Week 35 | Horns and Halos | Michael Monroe | |
| Week 36 | Hail to the King | Avenged Sevenfold | |
| Week 37 | Kymijoen lautturit | Viikate | |
| Week 38 | XXV | Klamydia | |
| Week 39 | Kuka muu muka | Cheek | |
| Week 40 | Kuka muu muka | Cheek | |
| Week 41 | Terra | Jenni Vartiainen | |
| Week 42 | Terra | Jenni Vartiainen | |
| Week 43 | Boom Kah | Robin | |
| Week 44 | Boom Kah | Robin | |
| Week 45 | Pohjantuuli | Suvi Teräsniska | |
| Week 46 | Tuomittuna kulkemaan | Vesa-Matti Loiri | |
| Week 47 | Vain elämää - Kausi 2 | Various artists | |
| Week 48 | Vain elämää - Kausi 2 | Various artists | |
| Week 49 | Vain elämää - Kausi 2 | Various artists | |
| Week 50 | Boom Kah | Robin | |
| Week 51 | Boom Kah | Robin | |
| Week 52 | Boom Kah | Robin | |

== See also ==
- List of number-one singles of 2013 (Finland)
