= List of number-one albums of 2009 (Finland) =

This is the complete list of (physical) number-one albums sold in Finland in 2009 according to Finland's Official List composed by Suomen Ääni- ja kuvatallennetuottajat ÄKT (since late August 2010, known as Musiikkituottajat – IFPI Finland).

== Chart history ==
Issue date	Album	Artist(s)	Reference(s)
Week 1	Kirkkahimmat 2000–2008	Lauri Tähkä & Elonkerjuu	
Week 2	Death Magnetic	Metallica	
Week 3	Death Magnetic	Metallica	
Week 4	Kaunis minä	Happoradio	
Week 5	Kaunis minä	Happoradio	
Week 6	Working on a Dream	Bruce Springsteen	
Week 7	Working on a Dream	Bruce Springsteen	
Week 8	Elämä on juhla	Samuli Putro	
Week 9	Ukonhauta	Kotiteollisuus	
Week 10	Rujoa taidetta	Klamydia	
Week 11	No Line on the Horizon	U2	
Week 12	The First Album	Pete Parkkonen	
Week 13	New Town	Koop Arponen	
Week 14	Veden varaan	PMMP	
Week 15	Veden varaan	PMMP	
Week 16	Veden varaan	PMMP	
Week 17	Veden varaan	PMMP	
Week 18	Sounds of the Universe	Depeche Mode	
Week 19	Anna Puu	Anna Puu	
Week 20	Anna Puu	Anna Puu	
Week 21	Jare Henrik Tiihonen	Cheek	
Week 22	Anna Puu	Anna Puu	
Week 23	Skyforger	Amorphis	
Week 24	Skyforger	Amorphis	
Week 25	Anna Puu	Anna Puu	
Week 26	Sisäinen eläin	Gebardi XXL	
Week 27	Black Clouds & Silver Linings	Dream Theater	
Week 28	Anna Puu	Anna Puu	
Week 29	The Essential Michael Jackson	Michael Jackson	
Week 30	Anna Puu	Anna Puu	
Week 31	Anna Puu	Anna Puu	
Week 32	Anna Puu	Anna Puu	
Week 33	Anna Puu	Anna Puu	
Week 34	Anna Puu	Anna Puu	
Week 35	Anna Puu	Anna Puu	
Week 36	Anna Puu	Anna Puu	
Week 37	Kuu kaakon yllä	Viikate	
Week 38	Loisto	Yö	
Week 39	Tänään ei huomista murehdita	Lauri Tähkä & Elonkerjuu	
Week 40	Tänään ei huomista murehdita	Lauri Tähkä & Elonkerjuu	
Week 41	Tänään ei huomista murehdita	Lauri Tähkä & Elonkerjuu	
Week 42	Sydänääniä	Kolmas nainen	
Week 43	Liebe ist für alle da	Rammstein	
Week 44	Ollaan ihmisiksi	Pate Mustajärvi	
Week 45	Strike!	The Baseballs	
Week 46	Strike!	The Baseballs	
Week 47	Strike!	The Baseballs	
Week 48	Strike!	The Baseballs	
Week 49	Strike!	The Baseballs	
Week 50	Strike!	The Baseballs	
Week 51	Strike!	The Baseballs	
Week 52	Strike!	The Baseballs	
Week 53	Strike!	The Baseballs	

== See also ==
- List of number-one singles of 2009 (Finland)
