= List of number-one singles of 2009 (Finland) =

This is the complete list of (physical and digital) number-one singles sold in Finland in 2009 according to the Official Finnish Charts. The list on the left side of the box (Suomen virallinen singlelista, "Official Finnish Singles Chart") represents both physical and digital track sales and the one on the right side (Suomen virallinen latauslista, "Official Finnish Download Chart") represents sales of digital tracks.

== Chart history ==
Official Finnish Singles Chart				Official Finnish Download Chart			
Issue date	Song	Artist(s)	Ref	Issue date	Song	Artist(s)	Ref
Week 1 (December 30, 2008)	"Hot n Cold"	Katy Perry		Week 1	"Hot n Cold"	Katy Perry	
Week 2 (January 6, 2009)	"Poker Face"	Lady Gaga		Week 2	"Poker Face"	Lady Gaga	
Week 3 (January 13)	"Poker Face"	Lady Gaga		Week 3	"Poker Face"	Lady Gaga	
Week 4 (January 20)	"Poker Face"	Lady Gaga		Week 4	"Poker Face"	Lady Gaga	
Week 5 (January 27)	"Poker Face"	Lady Gaga		Week 5	"Poker Face"	Lady Gaga	
Week 6 (February 3)	"Poker Face"	Lady Gaga		Week 6	"Poker Face"	Lady Gaga	
Week 7 (February 10)	"Poker Face"	Lady Gaga		Week 7	"Poker Face"	Lady Gaga	
Week 8 (February 17)	"Poker Face"	Lady Gaga		Week 8	"Poker Face"	Lady Gaga	
Week 9 (February 24)	"Poker Face"	Lady Gaga		Week 9	"Poker Face"	Lady Gaga	
Week 10 (March 3)	"Serotonin"	Widescreen Mode		Week 10	"Serotonin"	Widescreen Mode	
Week 11 (March 10)	"Ravistettava ennen käyttöä"	Apulanta		Week 11	"Ravistettava ennen käyttöä"	Apulanta	
Week 12 (March 17)	"Poker Face"	Lady Gaga		Week 12	"Poker Face"	Lady Gaga	
Week 13 (March 24)	"Poker Face"	Lady Gaga		Week 13	"Poker Face"	Lady Gaga	
Week 14 (March 31)	"Lose Control"	Waldo's People		Week 14	"Poker Face"	Lady Gaga	
Week 15 (April 7)	"Lose Control"	Waldo's People		Week 15	"Poker Face"	Lady Gaga	
Week 16 (April 14)	"Poker Face"	Lady Gaga		Week 16	"Poker Face"	Lady Gaga	
Week 17 (April 21)	"Jos mä oisin sä"	Cheek		Week 17	"Jos mä oisin sä"	Cheek	
Week 18 (April 28)	"Silver Bride"	Amorphis		Week 18	"Jos mä oisin sä"	Cheek	
Week 19 (5 May)	"Nyt huudetaan – Ihanaa, Leijonat, ihanaa (10v. remix)"	Antero Mertaranta		Week 19	"Nyt huudetaan – Ihanaa, Leijonat, ihanaa (10v. remix)"	Antero Mertaranta	
Week 20 (12 May)	"Jos mä oisin sä"	Cheek		Week 20	"Jos mä oisin sä"	Cheek	
Week 21 (19 May)	"Kesävainaja"	Viikate		Week 21	"Fairytale"	Alexander Rybak	
Week 22 (26 May)	"Nälkämaan laulu (Urhousremix 09)"	DJ Urho		Week 22	"Fairytale"	Alexander Rybak	
Week 23 (June 2)	"Fairytale"	Alexander Rybak		Week 23	"Fairytale"	Alexander Rybak	
Week 24 (June 9)	"Karkuri"	Järjestyshäiriö		Week 24	"Karkuri"	Järjestyshäiriö	
Week 25 (June 16)	"C'est la vie"	Anna Puu		Week 25	"C'est la vie"	Anna Puu	
Week 26 (June 23)	"Juuret"	Antti Tuisku		Week 26	"Jos mä oisin sä"	Cheek	
Week 27 (June 30)	"Juuret"	Antti Tuisku		Week 27	"Poikkeus sääntöön"	Aste	
Week 28 (July 7)	"Suudellaan"	Lauri Tähkä & Elonkerjuu		Week 28	"Poikkeus sääntöön"	Aste	
Week 29 (July 14)	"Jai Ho! (You Are; My Destiny)"	A. R. Rahman & The Pussycat Dolls (feat. Nicole Scherzinger)		Week 29	"Jai Ho! (You Are; My Destiny)"	A. R. Rahman & The Pussycat Dolls (feat. Nicole Scherzinger)	
Week 30 (July 21)	"Jai Ho! (You Are; My Destiny)"	A. R. Rahman & The Pussycat Dolls (feat. Nicole Scherzinger)		Week 30	"Jai Ho! (You Are; My Destiny)"	A. R. Rahman & The Pussycat Dolls (feat. Nicole Scherzinger)	
Week 31 (July 28)	"Jai Ho! (You Are; My Destiny)"	A. R. Rahman & The Pussycat Dolls (feat. Nicole Scherzinger)		Week 31	"Jai Ho! (You Are; My Destiny)"	A. R. Rahman & The Pussycat Dolls (feat. Nicole Scherzinger)	
Week 32 (August 4)	"Jai Ho! (You Are; My Destiny)"	A. R. Rahman & The Pussycat Dolls (feat. Nicole Scherzinger)		Week 32	"Jai Ho! (You Are; My Destiny)"	A. R. Rahman & The Pussycat Dolls (feat. Nicole Scherzinger)	
Week 33 (August 11)	"Celebration"	Madonna		Week 33	"Celebration"	Madonna	
Week 34 (August 18)	"Celebration"	Madonna		Week 34	"Celebration"	Madonna	
Week 35 (August 25)	"Celebration"	Madonna		Week 35	"Celebration"	Madonna	
Week 36 (September 1)	"Celebration"	Madonna		Week 36	"Celebration"	Madonna	
Week 37 (September 8)	"Celebration"	Madonna		Week 37	"Celebration"	Madonna	
Week 38 (September 15)	"Kiitos ja kunnia"	Yö		Week 38	"Celebration"	Madonna	
Week 39 (September 22)	"Celebration"	Madonna		Week 39	"Celebration"	Madonna	
Week 40 (September 29)	"Pussy"	Rammstein		Week 40	"Pussy"	Rammstein	
Week 41 (October 6)	"Polte päästä paratiisiin"	Jarkko Martikainen		Week 41	"Polte päästä paratiisiin"	Jarkko Martikainen	
Week 42 (October 13)	"Frontrow Girl"	White Flame		Week 42	"Frontrow Girl"	White Flame	
Week 43 (October 20)	"Polte päästä paratiisiin"	Jarkko Martikainen		Week 43	"Polte päästä paratiisiin"	Jarkko Martikainen	
Week 44 (October 27)	"Polte päästä paratiisiin"	Jarkko Martikainen		Week 44	"Polte päästä paratiisiin"	Jarkko Martikainen	
Week 45 (November 3)	"Umbrella"	The Baseballs		Week 45	"Umbrella"	The Baseballs	
Week 46 (November 10)	"Umbrella"	The Baseballs		Week 46	"Umbrella"	The Baseballs	
Week 47 (November 17)	"Umbrella"	The Baseballs		Week 47	"Umbrella"	The Baseballs	
Week 48 (November 24)	"Umbrella"	The Baseballs		Week 48	"Umbrella"	The Baseballs	
Week 49 (December 1)	"Kuollut kävelee"	Kotiteollisuus		Week 49	"Umbrella"	The Baseballs	
Week 50 (December 8)	"Umbrella"	The Baseballs		Week 50	"Umbrella"	The Baseballs	
Week 51 (December 15)	"Umbrella"	The Baseballs		Week 51	"Umbrella"	The Baseballs	
Week 52 (December 22)	"Bad Romance"	Lady Gaga		Week 52	"Bad Romance"	Lady Gaga	

== See also ==
- List of number-one albums of 2009 (Finland)
