= Sokka irti =

Studio album by Cheek
- Released: 16 April 2012
- Labels: Warner Music Finland & Liiga Music Oy
- Producers: MMEN, DJ RZY, Sakke, OP Beats

Cheek chronology
Jare Henrik Tiihonen 2 (2010)	Sokka irti (2012)	Kuka muu muka (2013)

Singles from Sokka irti
- 1. "Pyrkiny vähentää" Released: January 2012; 2. "Sokka irti" Released: April 2012; 3. "Syypää sun hymyyn" Released: May 2012; 4. "Anna mä meen" Released: October 2012; 5. "Kyyneleet" Released: March 2013

Sokka irti is the seventh studio album by Finnish rapper Cheek. It was released on 16 April 2012. The album peaked at number three on the Official Finnish Album Chart, and according to IFPI Finland, 27,467 copies of the album were sold during 2012. The album consists of 12 tracks and includes contributions from several Finnish musicians and producers.

== Singles ==
Five singles were released from the album; "Pyrkiny vähentää" (featuring Spekti), "Sokka irti", "Syypää sun hymyyn" (featuring Yasmine Yamajako), "Anna mä meen" (featuring Jonne Aaron) and "Kyyneleet (featuring Sami Saari). The singles were released between January 2012 and February 2013, with "Anna mä meen" reaching number one on the Finnish Singles Chart.

== Track listing ==
No.	Title	Length
1.	"Liiga Music"	2:54
2.	"Sokka irti"	3:27
3.	"Kyyneleet" (featuring Sami Saari)	4:16
4.	"Syypää sun hymyyn" (featuring Yasmine Yamajako)	3:47
5.	"Ei oikotietä"	3:15
6.	"Pyrkiny vähentää" (featuring Spekti)	3:07
7.	"Ne tekee"	3:42
8.	"2012"	3:06
9.	"Jehu"	3:06
10.	"Liian viilee"	3:58
11.	"Anna mä meen" (featuring Jonne Aaron)	4:04
12.	"Ohituskaistalla" (featuring Mikael Gabriel)	3:32

== Charts ==
Chart (2012)	Peak position
Finnish Albums Chart	3

== Release history ==
Region	Date	Format	Label
Finland	16 April 2012	CD, digital download	Warner Music Finland & Liiga Music Oy
