= Liiku =

Single by Cheek featuring Jonna

from the album Käännän sivuu
- Released: 2005
- Genre: Rap
- Length: 3:17
- Label: Sony Music Entertainment

Cheek singles chronology
"Avaimet mun himaan" (2004)	"Liiku" (2005)	"Nostan kytkintä" (2005)

"Liiku" is a song by Finnish rapper Cheek featuring Jonna. Released in 2005, the song serves as the first single from Cheek's second studio album Käännän sivuu. "Liiku" peaked at number five on the Finnish Singles Chart.

== Chart performance ==
Chart (2005)	Peak position
Finland (The Official Finnish Singles Chart)	5
