= Taikapeili =

Finnish pop music duo consisting of Hanna-Riikka Siitonen and Nina Tapio

Taikapeili was a Finnish pop music duo consisting of Hanna-Riikka Siitonen and Nina Tapio. They gained success in Finland in the mid-1990s with their debut album Suuri salaisuus (1994), earning them double platinum after selling 95 715 copies. Taikapeili went on to release two more albums before eventually breaking up. Their first hit, "Jos sulla on toinen", was also their biggest one. It was sampled by rapper Cheek in his 2013 song "Jossu".

== Selected discography ==
=== Studio albums ===
Year	Title	Peak position
Year	Title	FIN
1994	Suuri salaisuus	3
1995	Nähdään taas	2
1999	Nukahda jos uskallat	34

=== Compilation albums ===
Year	Title	Peak position
Year	Title	FIN
2000	20 suosikkia – Jos sulla on toinen	–
2007	Tähtisarja 30 suosikkia: Taikapeili	–
