= Kasvukipuja =

Studio album by Cheek
- Released: 18 April 2007
- Label: Rähinä Records
- Producer: MGI, MMEN, Haukka & Pualinelssoni, Ola

Cheek chronology
Käännän sivuu (2005)	Kasvukipuja (2007)	Kuka sä oot (2008)

Singles from Kasvukipuja
- 1. "Sun täytyy" Released: 2007; 2. "Tuhlaajapoika"

Kasvukipuja is the third studio album by Finnish rapper Cheek. It was released on 18 April 2007. The album peaked at number 19 on the Official Finnish Album Chart.

== Track listing ==
No.	Title	Length
1.	"Nälkä"	4:18
2.	"Vastatuulta" (featuring Sami Saari)	3:23
3.	"Älä" (featuring Jonna)	4:20
4.	"Stop"	3:29
5.	"Eri jengin heiniä"	4:50
6.	"1140"	4:15
7.	"Tuhlaajapoika" (featuring Tasis)	3:18
8.	"Sun täytyy" (featuring Sami Saari)	3:26
9.	"Aika kultaa muistot" (featuring Kike)	4:13
10.	"Kuka osaa kuka ei"	3:56
11.	"Kasvukipuja" (featuring Herrasmiesliiga)	5:10
12.	"Ryöstö"	3:01
13.	"Soitellaan"	3:22
14.	"Mielialat ylös alas"	4:35

== Charts ==
Chart (2007)	Peak position
Finnish Albums Chart	19

== Release history ==
Region	Date	Format	Label
Finland	18 April 2007	CD, digital download	Rähinä Records
