= Anna mä meen =

Single by Cheek featuring Jonne Aaron

from the album Sokka irti
- Released: 2012
- Genre: Rap, pop
- Length: 4:04
- Label: Warner Music Finland & Liiga Music Oy
- Producer: Sakke Aalto

Cheek singles chronology
| "Syypää sun hymyyn" (2012) | "Anna mä meen" (2012) | "Kyyneleet" (2013) |

"Anna mä meen" is a song by Finnish rapper Cheek. The song features an appearance by a singer Jonne Aaron. The song serves as the fourth single from Cheek's seventh studio album Sokka irti. The song peaked at number one on the Finnish Singles Chart in December 2012. A music video, directed by Petri Lahtinen, was uploaded to YouTube in October 2012.

== Chart performance ==
| Chart (2012) | Peak position |
|---|---|
| Finland (The Official Finnish Singles Chart) | 1 |
