= Sun täytyy =

Single by Cheek featuring Sami Saari

from the album Kasvukipuja
- Released: 2007
- Genre: Rap
- Length: 3:26
- Label: Rähinä Records
- Producer(s): MGI

Cheek singles chronology
"Nostan kytkintä" (2005)	"Sun täytyy" (2007)	"Tuhlaajapoika" (2007)

"Sun täytyy" is a song by Finnish rapper Cheek featuring soul singer Sami Saari. Released in 2007, the song serves as the first single from Cheek's third studio album Kasvukipuja. "Sun täytyy" peaked at number one on the Finnish Singles Chart.

== Chart performance ==
Chart (2007)	Peak position
Finland (The Official Finnish Singles Chart)	1
