= Sä huudat =

Single by Cheek

from the album Alpha Omega
- Released: 19 August 2015
- Genre: Hip hop
- Length: 3:10
- Label: Warner Music Finland & Liiga Music Oy

Cheek singles chronology
"Flexaa" (2014)	"Sä huudat" (2015)	"Me ollaan ne, Pt. 2" (2016)

"Sä huudat" is a song by Finnish rapper Cheek released, as the first single from his ninth studio album Alpha Omega. The song peaked at number one on the Finnish Singles Chart. A music video was filmed from the song by Hannu Aukia and posted on the record label's YouTube account on August 27, 2015.

== Charts ==
Chart (2015)	Peak position
Finland (Suomen virallinen lista)	1
