= Alpha Omega (Cheek album) =

Studio album by Cheek
- Released: 16 October 2015
- Genre: rap, pop
- Length: 38:59
- Language: Finnish
- Label: Warner Music Finland & Liiga Music Oy
- Producer: Cheek (exec.); Antti Riihimäki (exec.); MMEN; MGI; #33; Beni Blankko

Cheek chronology
| Kuka muu muka (2013) | Alpha Omega (2015) |

Singles from Alpha Omega
- 1. "Sä huudat" Released: 19 August 2015

Alpha Omega is the ninth and final studio album by Finnish rapper Cheek, released on 16 October 2015. The album peaked at number one on the Finnish Albums Chart.

== Singles ==
The release was preceded by single "Sä huudat" which peaked at number one on the Finnish Singles Chart.

== Track listing ==
| No. | Title | Length |
|---|---|---|
| 1. | "Alpha Omega" | 4:19 |
| 2. | "Sä huudat" | 3:10 |
| 3. | "Me ollaan ne" (featuring Nikke Ankara) | 3:39 |
| 4. | "Chekkonen" | 3:12 |
| 5. | "Sillat" (featuring Ilta) | 4:06 |
| 6. | "Leveellä" (featuring Herrasmiesliiga & Kapasiteettiyksikkö) | 4:24 |
| 7. | "Makee ja selkee" (featuring Kasmir) | 3:38 |
| 8. | "Jos sä haluut" (featuring Yasmine Yamajako) | 3:24 |
| 9. | "Keinu" | 3:54 |
| 10. | "Valot sammuu" | 5:03 |

== Charts ==
| Chart (2015) | Peak position |
|---|---|
| Finnish Albums (Suomen virallinen lista) | 1 |

== Release history ==
| Region | Date | Format | Label |
|---|---|---|---|
| Finland | 16 October 2015 | CD, digital download | Warner Music Finland & Liiga Music Oy |

== See also ==
- List of number-one albums of 2015 (Finland)
