= Avaimet mun himaan =

Single by Cheek featuring Idän Ihme & Tupla-S

from the album Avaimet mun kulmille
- Released: 2004
- Genre: Rap
- Length: 3:42
- Label: Sony Music Entertainment

Cheek singles chronology
"Raplaulajan vapaapäivä" (2004)	"Avaimet mun himaan" (2004)	"Liiku" (2005)

"Avaimet mun himaan" is a song by Finnish rapper Cheek featuring Idän Ihme & Tupla-S. Released in 2004, the song serves as the third single from Cheek's first studio album Avaimet mun kulmille. "Avaimet mun himaan" peaked at number 16 on the Finnish Singles Chart.

== Chart performance ==
Chart (2004)	Peak position
Finland (The Official Finnish Singles Chart)	16
