= Kuka sä oot =

Studio album by Cheek
- Released: 21 May 2008
- Label: Rähinä Records
- Producer: MGI, MMEN, GoodWill, OP Beats, Sakke

Cheek chronology
Kasvukipuja (2007)	Kuka sä oot (2008)	Jare Henrik Tiihonen (2009)

Singles from Kuka sä oot
- 1. "Liekeissä" Released: 16 April 2008; 2. "Kanssa tai ilman"

Kuka sä oot is the fourth studio album by Finnish rapper Cheek. It was released on 21 May 2008. The album peaked at number five on the Official Finnish Album Chart.

== Track listing ==
No.	Title	Length
1.	"Etsintäkuulutettu"	3:11
2.	"Liekeissä"	3:17
3.	"Kanssa tai ilman" (featuring Illi)	3:23
4.	"Housut roikkuu, pt. 2" (featuring SP & Elastinen)	3:35
5.	"Koukussa" (featuring Jimi Pääkallo)	3:43
6.	"Side" (featuring Näkökulma)	3:35
7.	"Etsi joku toinen" (featuring Johanna Försti)	4:06
8.	"Kurkipotku" (featuring Herrasmiesliiga)	3:29
9.	"Ukonilmalla" (featuring Kristiina Wheeler)	3:45
10.	"Etsä tiedä kuka mä luulen olevani"	3:28
11.	"Samaa rataa" (featuring Sami Saari)	4:46
12.	"Kulje mun kanssa"	4:21
13.	"Housut roikkuu, pt. 2 (Remix)" (featuring MGI, Joniveli, Jaise, Pyhimys, Leijonamieli, Markiisi, Steen1, Brädi & Iso H)	5:02

== Charts ==
Chart (2008)	Peak position
Finnish Albums Chart	5

== Release history ==
Region	Date	Format	Label
Finland	21 May 2008	CD, digital download	Rähinä Records
