= Nina Tapio =

- Born: February 24, 1972 (age 54)
- Origin: Finland
- Occupation: Singer
- Website: www.ninatapio.com

Nina Tapio (born February 24, 1972) is a Finnish singer, songwriter, musical actor, and session musician. Her singing career started at the age of five, when she sang on a children's record.

Tapio studied at Helsinki Pop & Jazz Conservatory where she got a degree as a teacher of singing. In 1994 she started the band Taikapeili together with Hanna-Riikka Siitonen, publishing three albums until 1999. In 1998 and 2003 she also recorded two albums with Adiemus.

In 2005 Tapio sung background vocals for Geir Rönning in the 2005 Eurovision Song Contest. She was also on the jury of the Finnish television show Idols the same year, and continued in the 2006–2007 season. She was invited to the Finnish prescreening for the 2006 Eurovision Song Contest together with Hanna-Riikka Siitonen, but they did not attend. Instead, Tapio read the scores given by Finland in the same contest.

Nina Tapio has been a background singer on the records of Finnish artists including Kirka, Tauski, Eini, Kake Randelin, Matti ja Teppo, and Meiju Suvas.

== Discography ==
=== With Taikapeili ===
- Suuri salaisuus (1994)
- Nähdään taas – moi! (1995)
- Nukahda, jos uskallat (1999)

=== With Adiemus ===
- Adiemus III: Dances of Time (1998)
- Adiemus V: Vocalise (2003)

=== Others ===
- Ethän käänny pois (Nina Tapio & Tomi Metsäketo, 2003)
- My One and Only Love (Nina Tapio & Geir Rönning, 2005)
- Jotain jää (Nina Tapio & Mikko Leppilampi, 2005)
- Elämän syliin (Nina Tapio, 2005)

=== Finnish TV dubs ===
- The Lion Guard (Reirei) (2016–2020)

=== Finnish film dubs ===
- The Little Mermaid (Ariel) (Newer Finnish dub, 1998)
- Quest For Camelot (Singing Voice Of Kayley) (1998)
- Prince of Egypt (Singing Voice Of Miriam) (1998)
- Toy Story 2 (Singing Voice of Jessie) (1999)
- The Little Mermaid II: Return to the Sea (2000)
- Garfield: The Movie (Dr. Liz Wilson) (2004)
- Chicken Little (Foxy Loxy) (2005)
- Herbie: Fully Loaded (Charisma) (2005)
- The Little Mermaid: Ariel's Beginning (2008)
- Frozen Fever (choir part) (2015)
- Once Upon a Studio (Singing Voice Of Pocahontas) (2023)
