= Syypää sun hymyyn =

Single by Cheek featuring Yasmine Yamajako

from the album Sokka irti
- Released: 2012
- Genre: Rap, pop
- Length: 3:47
- Label: Warner Music Finland & Liiga Music Oy
- Producer(s): OP Beats

Cheek singles chronology
"Sokka irti" (2012)	"Syypää sun hymyyn" (2012)	"Anna mä meen" (2012)

"Syypää sun hymyyn" is a song by Finnish rapper Cheek. The song features an appearance by a singer Yasmine Yamajako. The song serves as the third single from Cheek's seventh studio album Sokka irti. The song peaked at number two on the Finnish Singles Chart in December 2012. A music video, directed by Joonas Laaksoharju, was uploaded to YouTube in May 2012.

== Chart performance ==
Chart (2012)	Peak position
Finland (The Official Finnish Singles Chart)	2
