= Pyrkiny vähentää =

Single by Cheek featuring Spekti

from the album Sokka irti
- Released: 16 January 2012
- Genre: Hip hop
- Length: 3:11
- Label: Warner Music Finland & Liiga Music Oy
- Producer(s): Sakke Aalto

Cheek singles chronology
"Mikä siinä on" (2010)	"Pyrkiny vähentää" (2012)	"Sokka irti" (2012)

"Pyrkiny vähentää" is a song by Finnish rapper Cheek. The song features an appearance by a rapper Spekti. The song serves as the first single from Cheek's seventh studio album Sokka irti. The song debuted and peaked at number ten on the Finnish Singles Chart. A music video, directed by Juha Lankinen, was uploaded to YouTube on 16 January 2012.

== Chart performance ==
Chart (2012)	Peak position
Finland (The Official Finnish Singles Chart)	10
