= Flexaa =

Single by Cheek featuring Sanni and VilleGalle
- Released: 8 August 2014
- Genre: Hip hop
- Length: 3:38
- Label: Warner Music Finland & Liiga Music Oy

Cheek singles chronology
"Äärirajoille" (2014)	"Flexaa" (2014)	"Sä huudat" (2015)

"Flexaa" is a song by Finnish rapper Cheek featuring Sanni and VilleGalle. The song peaked at number three on the Finnish Singles Chart.

== Charts ==
Chart (2014)	Peak position
Finland (Suomen virallinen lista)	3
