= Sotke mut =

Studio album by Sanni
- Released: 20 September 2013
- Genre: Electropop
- Length: 45:10
- Language: Finnish
- Label: Warner Music Finland
- Producer: Hank Solo

Sanni chronology
Sotke mut (2013)	Lelu (2015)

Singles from Sotke mut
- 1. "Prinsessoja ja astronautteja" Released: 4 April 2013; 2. "Jos mä oon oikee" Released: 18 June 2013; 3. "Me ei olla enää me" Released: 20 September 2013; 4. "Dementia" Released: 12 February 2014; 5. "Hakuna matata" Released: May 2014

Sotke mut (English: Mess me up) is the debut studio album by Finnish singer-songwriter Sanni. It was released on September 20, 2013 by Warner Music Finland and was produced by Hank Solo. The album peaked at number-nine on the Finnish albums charts, and includes the top ten singles "Prinsessoja ja astronautteja" and "Me ei olla enää me". It has since been certified platinum by Musiikkituottajat after selling over 20,000 copies.

== Singles ==
The album's lead single, "Prinsessoja ja astronautteja" was released on 4 April 2013. The song peaked at number-three on the Finnish singles chart, while it also peaked at numbers 12 and 24, on the downloads and airplay charts, respectively. Its next single was "Jos mä oon oikee" which was released on 18 June 2013. The song did not peak on the singles chart, despite reaching number nineteen on both the airplay and downloads charts. The album's third single, "Me ei olla enää me" was released on 20 September 2013. It went on to peak at number-three on the Finnish singles chart, while it also reached numbers 4 and 13 on the airplay and downloads charts, respectively. "Dementia" and "Hakuna matata" were released as the fourth and fifth singles, respectively, in 2014.

== Track listing ==
No.	Title	Writer(s)	Producer(s)	Length
1.	"Prinsessoja ja astronautteja"	Sanni Kurkisuo	Hank Solo	3:58
2.	"Sotke mut (S&M)"	Kurkisuo	Solo	3:50
3.	"Jos mä oon oikee"	Kurkisuo	Solo	4:05
4.	"Hakuna matata"	Kurkisuo	Solo	3:27
5.	"Me ei olla enää me"	Kurkisuo	Solo	3:53
6.	"Dementia"	Kurkisuo	Solo	3:28
7.	"Kiinni" (featuring Kasmir)	Kurkisuo, Thomas Kirjonen	Solo	4:36
8.	"Kiitos & anteeksi"	Kurkisuo	Solo	2:36
9.	"Utopiaa"	Kurkisuo	Solo	4:01
10.	"56 km"	Kurkisuo	Solo	1:38
11.	"XO terkkuja kotiin!"	Kurkisuo	Solo	4:06
12.	"Luodinkestävä"	Kurkisuo	Solo	5:39

== Charts and certifications ==
=== Charts ===
Chart (2013)	Peak position
Finnish Albums (Suomen virallinen lista)	9

=== Certifications ===
Region	Certification	Certified units/sales
Finland (Musiikkituottajat)	Platinum	20,000+

== Release history ==
Region	Date	Format	Label
Finland	20 September 2013	CD, digital download	Warner Music Finland
