= Äärirajoille =

Single by Cheek
- Released: 8 August 2014
- Genre: Hip hop
- Length: 3:29
- Label: Warner Music Finland & Liiga Music

Cheek singles chronology
"Timantit on ikuisia" (2013)	"Äärirajoille" (2014)	"Flexaa" (2014)

"Äärirajoille" is a song by Finnish rapper Cheek. The song peaked at number four on the Finnish Singles Chart.

== Charts ==
Chart (2014)	Peak position
Finland (Suomen virallinen lista)	4
