= Sokka irti (song) =

Single by Cheek

from the album Sokka irti
- Released: 2 April 2012
- Genre: Rap
- Length: 3:27
- Label: Warner Music Finland & Liiga Music Oy
- Producer(s): Sakke Aalto

Cheek singles chronology
"Pyrkiny vähentää" (2012)	"Sokka irti" (2012)	"Syypää sun hymyyn" (2012)

"Sokka irti" is a song by Finnish rapper Cheek. The song serves as the second single from Cheek's seventh studio album, also titled Sokka irti. The song peaked at number three on the Finnish Singles Chart in May 2012. A music video was shot in Los Angeles and uploaded to YouTube on 15 April 2012.

== Chart performance ==
Chart (2012)	Peak position
Finland (The Official Finnish Singles Chart)	3
