= Hunningolla =

Studio album by Erin
- Released: 20 May 2011
- Genre: Pop
- Label: Warner Music Finland
- Producer: Suvi Vainio & Vesa Anttila

Erin chronology
Hunningolla (2011)	Sä osaat! (2013)

Hunningolla is the debut solo album of the Finnish singer-songwriter Erin. It was released on 20 May 2011. In its first week of release, the album peaked at number four on the Finnish Album Chart.

== Singles ==
Four singles were released from the album. First of those, "Vanha nainen hunningolla", peaked at number eight on the Finnish Singles Chart. "Popeda", "Vanha sydän" and "On elämä laina" failed to chart.

== Track listing ==
No.	Title	Length
1.	"Vanha nainen hunningolla"	3:15
2.	"Kokeile mua"	2:26
3.	"Sä et olisi aamulla siinä"	3:54
4.	"Onko se oikein"	3:33
5.	"Alouette"	3:07
6.	"Popeda"	3:44
7.	"Ootte idioottei"	3:05
8.	"Ole vaan"	4:12
9.	"Vanha sydän"	3:10
10.	"Ei se siitä"	4:10
11.	"On elämä laina"	4:07

== Chart performance ==
Chart (2011)	Peak position
Finland (Suomen virallinen lista)	4
