= Avaimet mun kiesiin =

Song by rapper Cheek

Single by Cheek featuring MasQ

from the album Avaimet mun kulmille
- Released: 3 March 2004
- Genre: Finnish hip hop
- Length: 3:41
- Label: Sony Music Entertainment

Cheek singles chronology
"Avaimet mun kiesiin" (2004)	"Raplaulajan vapaapäivä" (2004)

"Avaimet mun kiesiin" is the first single by the Finnish rapper Cheek, taken from his first studio album Avaimet mun kulmille, and featuring MasQ. Released on 3 March 2004, the song peaked at number six on the Finnish Singles Chart.

== Chart performance ==
Chart (2004)	Peak position
Finland (The Official Finnish Singles Chart)	6
