= Jare Henrik Tiihonen 2 =

Studio album by Cheek
- Released: 22 September 2010
- Label: Rähinä Records
- Producer: MMEN, Elastinen, Sakke, OP Beats, Coach Beats

Cheek chronology
Jare Henrik Tiihonen (2009)	Jare Henrik Tiihonen 2 (2010)	Sokka irti (2012)

Singles from Jare Henrik Tiihonen 2
- 1. "Jippikayjei" Released: 11 August 2010; 2. "Maanteiden kingi" 3. "Mikä siinä on"

Jare Henrik Tiihonen 2 is the sixth studio album by Finnish rapper Cheek. It was released on 22 September 2010. The album peaked at number one on the Official Finnish Album Chart.

== Track listing ==
No.	Title	Length
1.	"Viimeiseen hengenvetoon" (featuring Illi)	3:49
2.	"Maanteiden kingi"	3:54
3.	"Niin hyvin että hävettää" (featuring Mia)	3:24
4.	"Jippikayjei"	3:23
5.	"Mikä siinä on" (featuring Jontte)	4:06
6.	"Resepti" (featuring Herrasmiesliiga)	4:29
7.	"Mä en nää rakkautta" (featuring Sami Saari)	4:05
8.	"Repsikka" (featuring Osmo Ikonen)	3:29
9.	"Takapulpetin poika"	4:02
10.	"Tyhmää ja tyylikästä"	4:05
11.	"Orjantappuraa"	5:12
12.	"Se parhaiten nauraa" (featuring Herrasmiesliiga)	3:19

== Charts ==
Chart (2010)	Peak position
Finnish Albums Chart	1

== Release history ==
Region	Date	Format	Label
Finland	22 September 2010	CD, digital download	Rähinä Records
