= Raplaulajan vapaapäivä =

Single by Cheek featuring Brädi & Pappa

from the album Avaimet mun kulmille
- Released: 2004
- Genre: Rap
- Length: 4:03
- Label: Sony Music Entertainment

Cheek singles chronology
"Avaimet mun kiesiin" (2004)	"Raplaulajan vapaapäivä" (2004)	"Avaimet mun himaan" (2004)

"Raplaulajan vapaapäivä" is a song by Finnish rapper Cheek featuring Brädi & Pappa. Released in 2004, the song serves as the second single from Cheek's first studio album Avaimet mun kulmille. "Raplaulajan vapaapäivä" peaked at number six on the Finnish Singles Chart. It samples the song ''Poplaulajan vapaapäivä'' by Neljä Ruusua.

== Chart performance ==
Chart (2004)	Peak position
Finland (The Official Finnish Singles Chart)	6
