= Kyyneleet =

Single by Cheek featuring Sami Saari

from the album Sokka irti
- Released: 15 February 2013
- Genre: Rap, pop, soul
- Length: 4:04
- Label: Warner Music Finland & Liiga Music Oy
- Songwriter(s): Timo Veji Kiiskinen, Antti Riihimaeki, Jare Henrik Tiionen
- Producer(s): DJ RZY

Cheek singles chronology
"Anna mä meen" (2012)	"Kyyneleet" (2013)	"Jossu" (2013)

"Kyyneleet" is a song by Finnish rapper Cheek. The song features an appearance by a soul singer Sami Saari and a sample of Saari's song "Onnen kyyneleet". The song was released as a fifth and final single from Cheek's seventh studio album Sokka irti. "Kyyneleet" peaked at number 20 on the Finnish Singles Chart. A music video, directed by Petri Lahtinen, was uploaded to YouTube in February 2013.

== Charts ==
Chart (2013)	Peak position
Finland (Suomen virallinen lista)	20
