= Nostan kytkintä =

Single by Cheek

from the album Käännän sivuu
- Released: 2005
- Genre: Rap
- Length: 3:23
- Label: Sony Music Entertainment

Cheek singles chronology
"Liiku" (2005)	"Nostan kytkintä" (2005)	"Sun täytyy" (2007)

"Nostan kytkintä" is a song by Finnish rapper Cheek. Released in 2005, the song serves as the second single from Cheek's second studio album Käännän sivuu. "Nostan kytkintä" peaked at number 13 on the Finnish Singles Chart.

== Chart performance ==
Chart (2005)	Peak position
Finland (The Official Finnish Singles Chart)	13
