= Kaija Koo =

Finnish singer (born 1962)

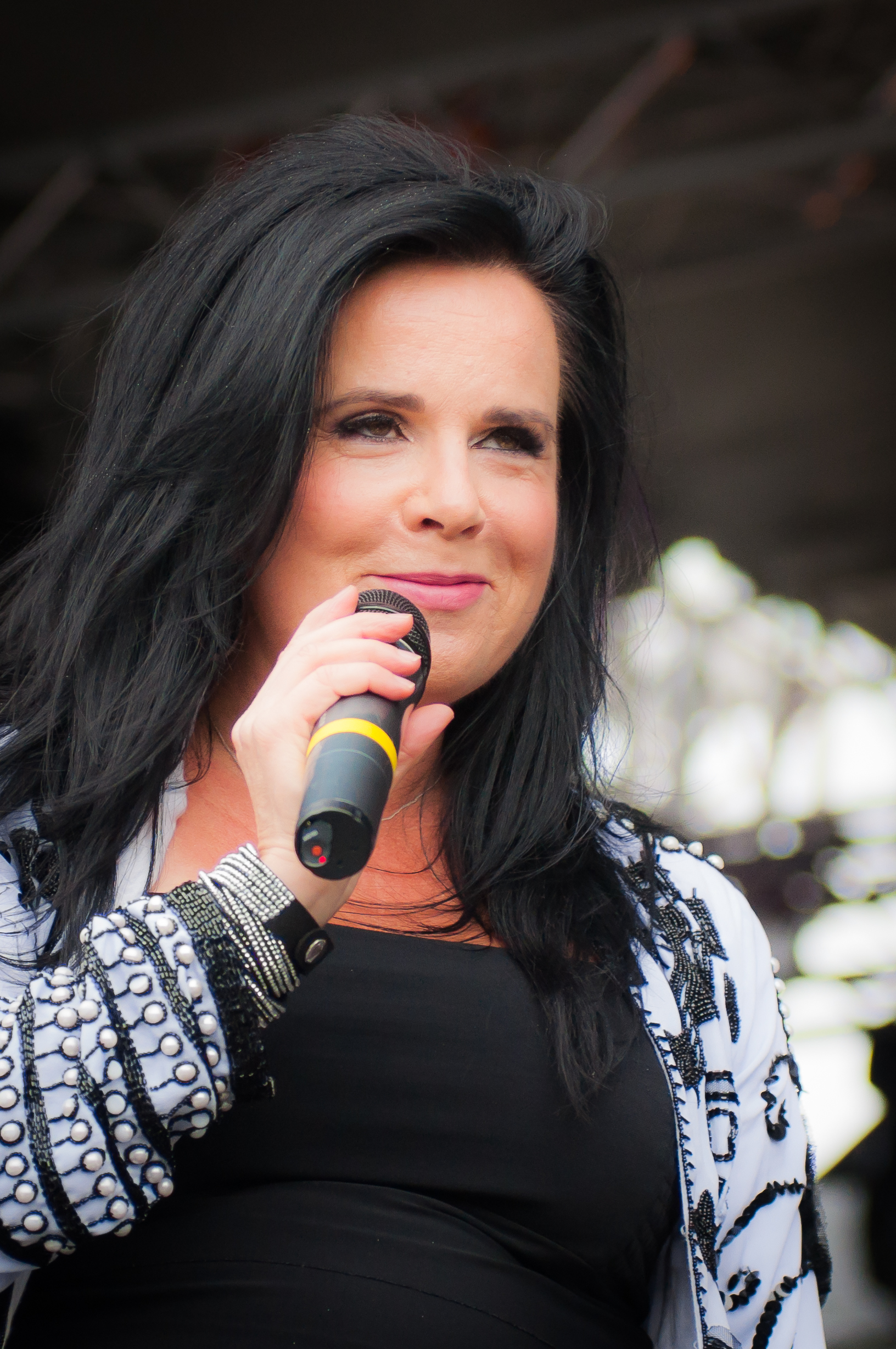
- Kaija Koo performing at 2013 Rakuunarock festival in Lappeenranta, Finland.

Background information
- Born: Kaija Irmeli Kokkola; 10 September 1962 (age 63); Helsinki, Finland
- Genres: Pop music
- Occupation: Singer
- Instrument: Vocals
- Years active: 1980–present
- Labels: Warner Music; Cosmos Music Group; Päijät-Hämeen Sorto ja Riisto

Kaija Kokkola (born 10 September 1962), better known by her stage name Kaija Koo, is a Finnish singer.

Kokkola began her career when she was 17 years old, as a member of the band Steel City, later known as Kaija Koo Band, until it broke up and Kaija Koo became a solo artist. Her debut solo album Kun savukkeet on loppuneet was released in 1986. The next album, Tuulten viemää, created with her then-husband Markku Impiö and released in 1993, was Kaija Koo's major breakthrough. It sold 175 000 copies, making it the sixth-best-selling album of all time in Finland. Kaija Koo also participated in the Finnish qualification of Eurovision Song Contest 1981 as a member of the background choir in Frederik's song "Titanic".

Since her breakthrough, Kaija Koo has remained successful, releasing a new album every few years. During her career, she has sold over 540,000 certified records, which makes her the 16th-best-selling music artist, the ninth-best-selling solo artist and the third-best-selling female solo artist in Finland.

== Discography ==
=== Studio albums ===
Year	Album	Peak position
Year	Album	FIN
1986	Kun savukkeet on loppuneet	–
1993	Tuulten viemää	1
1995	Tuulikello	7
1997	Unihiekkamyrsky	1
1998	Operaatio jalokivimeri	1
1999	Tinakenkätyttö	5
2002	Mikään ei riitä	2
2004	Viiden minuutin hiljaisuus	3
2005	Joulukirkossa	–
2007	H-Hetki	10
2010	Irti	2
2014	Kuka sen opettaa	1
2016	Sinun naisesi	2
2021	Taipumaton	1

=== Compilations ===
Year	Album	Peak position
Year	Album	FIN
2000	Tuuleen piirretyt vuodet 1980–2000	5
2006	Minä olen muistanut	–
2011	Tähtisarja – 30 suosikkia	46
2011	Kaunis, rietas, onnellinen – Parhaat 1980–2011	2

=== Singles ===
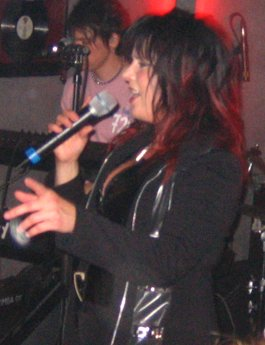
Kaija Koo in 2006

Year	Title	Peak position	Album
Year	Title	FIN	Album
1999	"Tinakenkätyttö"	10	Tinakenkätyttö
2002	"Mikään ei riitä"	15	Mikään ei riitä
2010	"Vapaa"	1	Irti
2011	"Kaunis rietas onnellinen"	7	Kaunis rietas onnellinen – Parhaat 1980–2011
2014	"Kuka sen opettaa"	17	Kuka sen opettaa
2016	"Siniset tikkaat"	—	Sinun naisesi
2016	"Nää yöt ei anna armoo"	6	Sinun naisesi
2017	"Syypää sun hymyyn"	12	Vain elämää kausi 7
2018	"Paa mut cooleriin" (featuring Reino Nordin)	11	–
2018	"Mun sydän"	7	–
2018	"Tule lähemmäs beibi 2018" (featuring Jenni Vartiainen, Vesala and Sanni)	8	–
2020	"Onnellinen loppu"	14	–
2021	"Sateenkaari pimeessä"	14	Taipumaton
2021	"Sattuu" (with Pyhimys)	11	
2022	"Nopee Hopee" (with Vesala)	19	
2025	"Räsypokka"	33	
2026	"Latu on auki" (with Isac Elliot)	2	

Listing

- "Steel City" (1980) (Steel City)
- "Seis" (1980) (Steel City)
- "Kaupungin kasvot" (1981) (Steel City)
- "Radio Girls" (1982) (Steel City)
- "Muodikkaat kasvot" / "Pelihalli" (1983) (Kaija Kokkola & City Band)
- "Velho" / "Kolmen jälkeen aamulla" (1984)
- "Tyhjyys" / "Kuka huutaa" (1985)
- "Kaikki vanhat filmit" (1985)
- "Kun savukkeet on loppuneet" (1986)
- "Pelkään sua, pelkäät mua" (1986)
- "Kuka keksi rakkauden" (1993)
- "Niin kaunis on hiljaisuus" (1993)
- "Tule lähemmäs Beibi" (1993)
- "Kylmä ilman sua" (1994)
- "Menneen talven lumet" (1995)
- "Seuraavassa elämässä" (1995)
- "Taivas sisälläni" (1995)
- "Viisi vuodenaikaa" (1995)
- "Maailman tuulet vie" (1995)
- "Unihiekkamyrsky" (1997)
- "Minä muistan sinut" (1997)
- "Minun tuulessani soi" (1998)
- "Päivät lentää" (1998)
- "Siipiveikko" (1998)
- "Valomerkin aikaan" (1998)
- "Isä" (1999)
- "Ex-nainen" (2000)
- "Jos sua ei ois ollut" (2000)
- "Antaa olla" (2001)
- "Yhtä kaikki" (2002)
- "Et voi satuttaa enää" (2002)
- "Kylmät kyyneleet" (2004)
- "Aika jättää" (2004)
- "Alan jo unohtaa" (2004)
- "Huone kahdelle" (2005)
- "Jouluyö, juhlayö, toive joululaulu" (2005)
- "Minä olen muistanut" (2006)
- "Mentävä on" (2007)
- "Erottamattomat" (2007)
- "Miltä se tuntuu?" (2007)
- "Minä uskon" (2008)
- "Rakkaus on voimaa" (2010)
- "Ja mä laulan" (2011)
- "Vanhaa suolaa" (2011)
- "Päivä kerrallaan" (2012)
- "Supernaiset" (2014)
- "Surulapsi" (2014)
- "Ajoin koko yön" (2014)
- "En pelkää pimeää" (2015)
- "Joku jonka vuoksi kuolla" (2016)

== See also ==
- List of best-selling music artists in Finland
