= Lelu (album) =

Studio album by Sanni
- Released: 24 April 2015
- Genre: Pop; electropop; hip hop
- Length: 39:59
- Language: Finnish
- Label: Warner Music Finland
- Producer: Hank Solo

Sanni chronology
Sotke mut (2013)	Lelu (2015)	Sanni (2016)

Singles from Lelu
- 1. "2080-luvulla" Released: 13 February 2015; 2. "Pojat" Released: 16 May 2015; 3. "Supernova" Released: July 2015

Lelu (English: Toy) is the second studio album by Finnish singer-songwriter Sanni. It was released on 24 April 2015 by Warner Music Finland and was produced by Hank Solo. The album was preceded by the chart-topping lead single "2080-luvulla".

== Singles ==
The album's lead single, "2080-luvulla" was released on 13 February 2015. The song has peaked at number-one on the Finnish airplay and downloads charts, while it peaked it number-three on the singles chart. The song holds the record for longest consecutive run at number-one on the Finnish airplay charts of all-time with eleven weeks. "Pojat" was released as the second single on 16 May 2015 alongside the video for the song. Sanni confirmed in July that "Supernova" will be released as the third single.

== Track listing ==
No.	Title	Writer(s)	Producer(s)	Length
1.	"Lelu"	Sanni Kurkisuo	Hank Solo	3:45
2.	"2080-luvulla"	Kurkisuo	Solo	4:17
3.	"Pojat" (featuring Tippa-T)	Kurkisuo	Solo	3:23
4.	"Supernova"	Kurkisuo	Solo	4:52
5.	"Mitä jos ne näkee"	Kurkisuo	Solo	4:12
6.	"Lapsi Heurekassa"	Kurkisuo	Solo	3:59
7.	"Isin tyttö"	Kurkisuo	Solo	4:25
8.	"Lauantai-iltana"	Kurkisuo	Solo	3:53
9.	"Kokaiini"	Kurkisuo	Solo	3:58
10.	"Soita mua (S&M)"	Kurkisuo	Solo	2:55

== Charts ==
=== Weekly charts ===
Chart (2015)	Peak position
Finnish Albums (Suomen virallinen lista)	1

== Release history ==
Region	Date	Format	Label
Finland	24 April 2015	CD, digital download	Warner Music Finland
