= Parempi mies =

Promotional single by Cheek featuring Samuli Edelmann

from the album Kuka muu muka
- Released: October 2013
- Length: 4:03
- Label: Warner Music Finland & Liiga Music Oy
- Songwriters: William Bell, Booker T Jones, Jyri Antero Riikonen, Jare Henrik Tiihonen

"Parempi mies" is a song by Finnish rapper Cheek featuring Samuli Edelmann. The song was released as a promotional single from Cheek's tenth studio album Kuka muu muka. The single and the accompanying music video, directed by Hannu Aukia, were released in October 2013. "Parempi mies" peaked at number six on the Finnish Singles Chart.

== Charts ==
Chart (2013)	Peak position
Finland (Suomen virallinen lista)	6
