= Liekeissä =

Single by Cheek

from the album Kuka sä oot
- Released: 16 April 2008
- Genre: Rap
- Length: 3:17
- Label: Rähinä Records
- Songwriter(s): J Penttinen, O Riita, Cheek
- Producer(s): MMEN

Cheek singles chronology
"Tuhlaajapoika" (2007)	"Liekeissä" (2008)	"Kanssa tai ilman" (2008)

"Liekeissä" is a song by Finnish rapper Cheek. Released on 16 April 2008, the song serves as the first single from Cheek's fourth studio album Kuka sä oot. "Liekeissä" peaked at number one on the Finnish Singles Chart.

== Chart performance ==
Chart (2008)	Peak position
Finland (The Official Finnish Singles Chart)	1
