= Prinsessoja ja astronautteja =

Single by Sanni

from the album Sotke mut
- Released: 4 April 2013
- Genre: Pop; hip hop; electronic
- Length: 3:57
- Label: Warner Music Finland
- Songwriter(s): Sanni Kurkisuo
- Producer(s): Hank Solo

Sanni singles chronology
"Prinsessoja ja astronautteja" (2013)	"Jos mä oon oikee" (2013)

"Prinsessoja ja astronautteja" (English: Princesses and astronauts) is the debut single by Finnish singer-songwriter Sanni. It was released on 4 April 2013 through Warner Music Finland as the lead single of her debut studio album Sotke mut. The song was composed by Sanni and Hank Solo, while its lyrics were written by Sanni and it was produced by Solo.

== Charts ==
=== Weekly charts ===
Chart (2015)	Peak position
Finland (Suomen virallinen lista)	3
Finland Download (Latauslista)	12
Finland Airplay (Radiosoittolista)	24
