= Jossu (song) =

Single by Cheek featuring Jukka Poika

from the album Kuka muu muka
- Released: 31 May 2013
- Genre: Hip hop
- Length: 3:12
- Label: Warner Music Finland & Liiga Music Oy
- Songwriters: Jare Tiihonen, Jukka Poika, Antti Riihimäki, Kristian Maukonen

Cheek singles chronology
"Kyyneleet" (2013)	"Jossu" (2013)	"Timantit on ikuisia" (2013)

Jukka Poika singles chronology
"Siideripissis" (2012)	"Jossu" (2013)

"Jossu" is a song by Finnish rapper Cheek featuring reggae artist Jukka Poika. The song serves as the first single from Cheek's tenth studio album Kuka muu muka, released on 20 September 2013. The chorus of "Jossu" samples a 1994 Taikapeili song "Jos sulla on toinen". A music video, directed by Hannu Aukia, was uploaded to YouTube on 1 June 2013.

== Charts ==
Chart (2013)	Peak position
Finland (Suomen virallinen lista)	1
