= Sä osaat! =

Studio album by Erin
- Released: 7 June 2013
- Genre: Pop
- Label: Warner Music Finland
- Producer: Suvi Vainio & Vesa Anttila

Erin chronology
Hunningolla (2011)	Sä osaat! (2013)	Seliseli (2016)

Singles from Sä osaat!
- 1. "Ei taida tietää tyttö" Released: 15 May 2013

Sä osaat! is the second solo studio album by Finnish singer-songwriter Erin. It was released on 7 June 2013. In its first week of release, the album debuted at number one on the Finnish Album Chart.

== Singles ==
The first single from the album, "Ei taida tietää tyttö", was released on 15 May 2013. The song peaked at number nine on the Finnish Singles Chart.

== Track listing ==
No.	Title	Length
1.	"Älä tule hyvä tyttö"	3:15
2.	"Ei taida tietää tyttö"	3:28
3.	"Toiset mimmit"	3:33
4.	"Laura tietää sen"	3:39
5.	"Väärä mies"	3:51
6.	"Mä kuulun tähän"	3:58
7.	"Kakkukahvit"	3:32
8.	"Annan maani pyöriä"	3:33
9.	"En sano"	3:52
10.	"Oisko se toi"	3:41

== Charts and certifications ==
=== Charts ===
Chart (2013)	Peak position
Finnish Albums (Suomen virallinen lista)	1

=== Certifications ===
Region	Certification	Certified units/sales
Finland (Musiikkituottajat)	Platinum	27,954
