= Jippikayjei =

Single by Cheek

from the album Jare Henrik Tiihonen 2
- Released: 11 August 2010
- Genre: Rap
- Length: 3:23
- Label: Rähinä Records
- Producers: MMEN, Elastinen, Iso H

Cheek singles chronology
"Mitä tänne jää" (2009)	"Jippikayjei" (2010)	"Maanteiden kingi" (2010)

Music video
- "Jippikayjei" on YouTube

"Jippikayjei" is a song by Finnish rapper Cheek. Released on 11 August 2010, the song serves as the first single from Cheek's sixth studio album Jare Henrik Tiihonen 2. "Jippikayjei" peaked at number one on the Finnish Singles Chart.

== Chart performance ==
Chart (2010)	Peak position
Finland (Suomen virallinen lista)	1
