= Sanni (singer) =

Finnish singer and actress

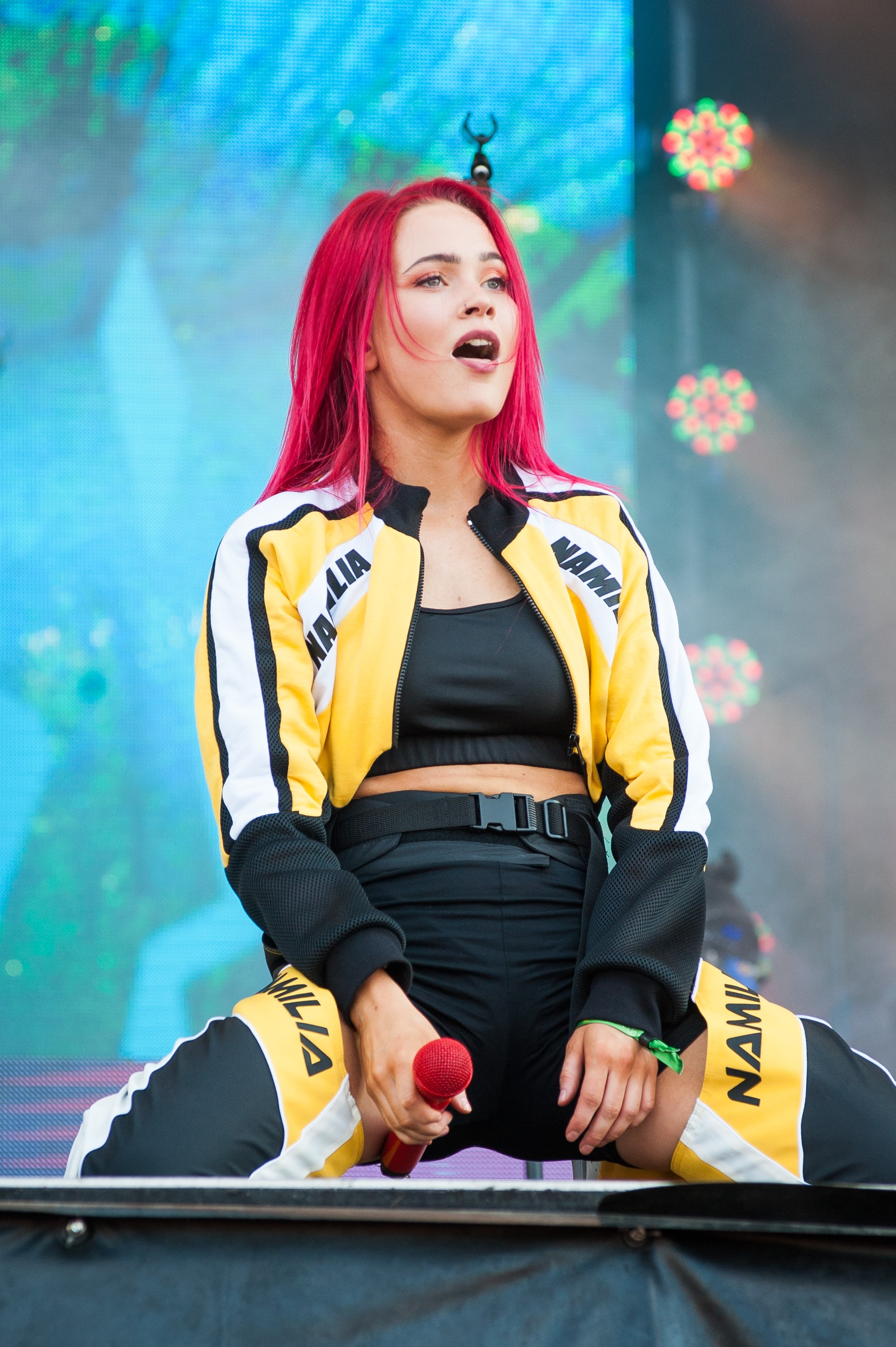
- Kurkisuo performing at Ilosaarirock in 2018

Background information
- Born: Sanni Mari Elina Kurkisuo; 26 May 1993 (age 33); Lohja, Finland
- Genres: Electropop
- Years active: 2001–present
- Label: Warner Music Finland

Sanni Mari Elina Kurkisuo (born 26 May 1993), better known by her mononym Sanni, is a Finnish singer, songwriter and actress signed to Warner Music Finland. Kurkisuo is known for her personal style, and is generally considered as one of Finland's most popular artists. She is the most listened female artist on Spotify in Finland, and has won three Emma awards out of 17 total nominations.

== Career ==
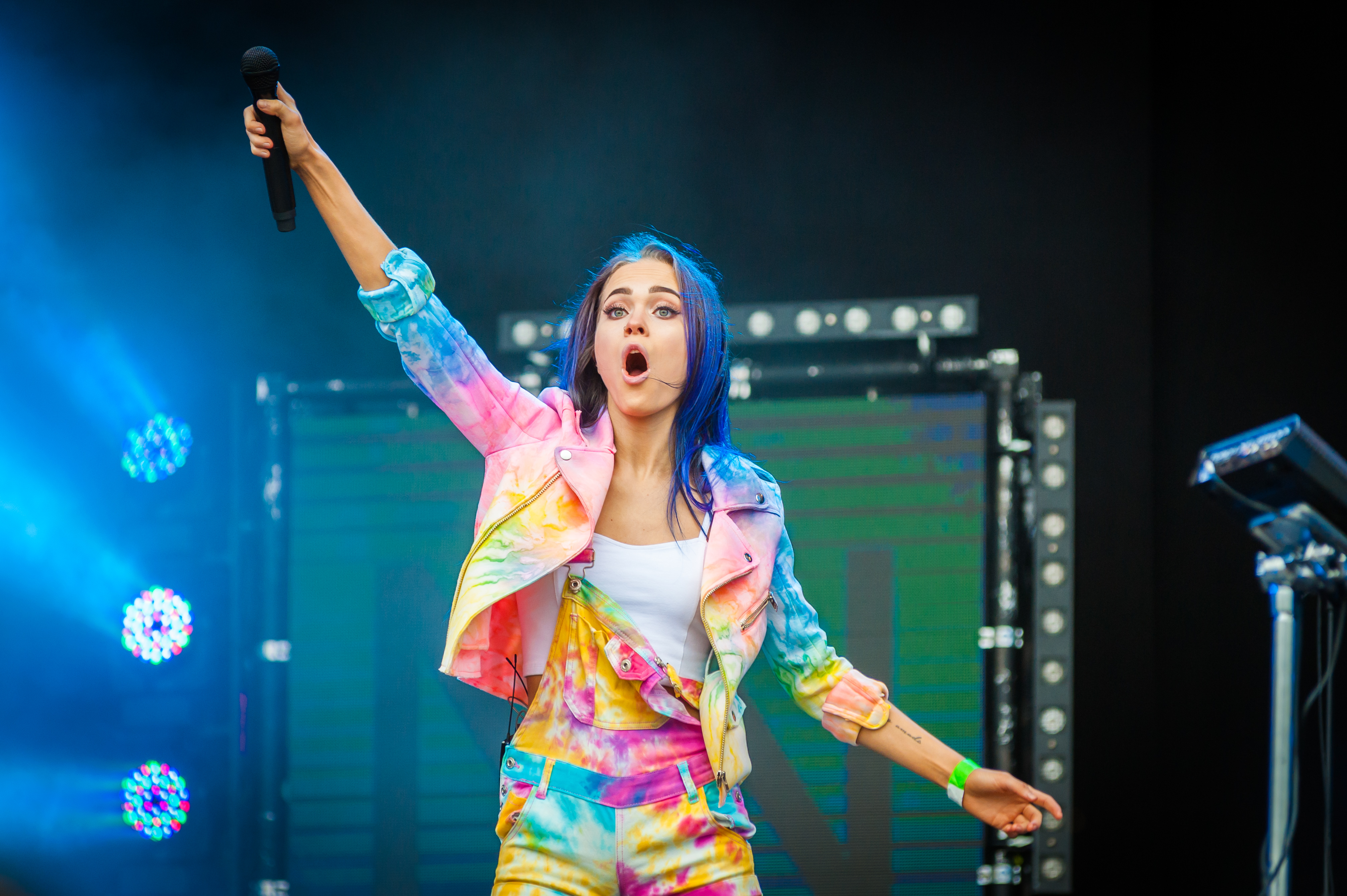
Sanni performing at Ilosaarirock in 2016.

In 2001, she won the Napero-Finlandia prize for a writing competition. In 2012, she graduated from Sibelius-lukio arts school. The same year, she appeared in a role in the Finnish film Miss Farkku-Suomi.

She has also pursued a musical career and was in a number of bands since the age of 13. She was featured on "Pumppaa", a single by Aste. She released her first solo single "Prinsessoja ja astronautteja" in April 2013. It peaked at number three on The Official Finnish Charts. Her debut album Sotke mut was released in 2013.

On 13 February 2015, she released a single, "2080-luvulla". Her second studio album Lelu, was released on 24 April 2015. She participated in the fourth season of the Finnish music reality show Vain elämää.

On 7 October 2016, she released her third eponymous album Sanni.

== Personal life ==
Sanni lived together with her girlfriend, Finnish model, radio host and beauty pageant titleholder Shirly Karvinen in Helsinki, Finland. They broke up in 2025.

== Discography ==
=== Albums ===
Year	Title	Peak position
Year	Title	FIN
2013	Sotke mut	9
2015	Lelu	1
2016	Sanni	1
2019	Trippi	1
2024	Muutos	5
2026	Rakastavaiset	4

=== Singles ===
Year	Title	Peak position	Album
Year	Title	FIN	Album
2013	"Prinsessoja ja astronautteja"	3	Sotke mut
2013	"Jos mä oon oikee"	—	Sotke mut
2013	"Me ei olla enää me"	3	Sotke mut
2014	"Dementia"	—	Sotke mut
2014	"Hakuna matata"	—	Sotke mut
2015	"2080-luvulla"	3	Lelu
2015	"Pojat" (featuring Tippa-T)	11	Lelu
2015	"Supernova"	—	Lelu
2015	"Ei"	3	Vain elämää kausi 4 – päivä
2016	"Että mitähän vittua"	1	Sanni
2016	"Vahinko"	2	Sanni
2016	"Oo se kun oot" (featuring Paperi T)	1	Sanni
2016	"Ku Kanye Kanyee" (featuring Cheek)	5	Sanni
2017	"Tahdon rakastella sinua"	4	Non-album single
2017	"Timantit on ikuisia"	5	Vain elämää kausi 7
2017	"Ravistettava ennen käyttöä"	13	Vain elämää kausi 7
2017	"Kelpaat kelle vaan" (featuring Apocalyptica)	2	Vain elämää kausi 7
2017	"Minä sinua vaan"	20	Vain elämää kausi 7
2018	"Pornoo"	1	Trippi
2018	"Jacuzzi"	1	Trippi
2018	"Sit ku mä oon vapaa"	7	Trippi
2018	"Kaunis koti"	2	Trippi
2018	"Dracula"	2	Non-album single
2019	"Hei kevät"	2	Trippi
2019	"Pommi (Pampampam)"	3	Trippi
2019	"Psykologi"	17	Trippi
2021	"Pettäjä"	1	Kesken EP
2021	"Kesken"	2	Kesken EP
2022	"Tyhmä"	8	Kesken EP
2023	"Haukilahden rantaan"	3	Muutos
2023	"Mielenmaisemat"	13	Muutos
2024	"Eliniänodote"	24	Muutos
2024	"Paperihaavoja" (featuring Gettomasa)	6	Non-album single
2024	"Pikajunat"	22	Muutos
2024	"Roomaan"	16	Muutos
2026	"Sinä ja se poitsu"	4	Rakastavaiset
2026	"Hävisin eron"	16	Rakastavaiset
2026	"Booty Call" (with Käärijä)	25	Non-album single

=== Featured in ===
Year	Title	Peak position	Album
Year	Title	FIN	Album
2014	"Flexaa" (Cheek featuring Sanni and VilleGalle)	3	–
2015	"Lähtisitkö" (VilleGalle featuring Sanni)	1	Vain elämää kausi 4 – ilta
2016	"Miten eskimot suutelee?" (Robin featuring Sanni)	14	Yhdessä
2018	"Tule lähemmäs beibi 2018" (Kaija Koo featuring Jenni Vartiainen, Vesala, Sanni)	–	–

=== Other charted songs ===
Year	Title	Peak position	Album
Year	Title	FIN	Album
2015	"Levoton tyttö"	17	Vain elämää kausi 4 – ilta
