= Jonne Aaron =

Finnish singer (born 1983)

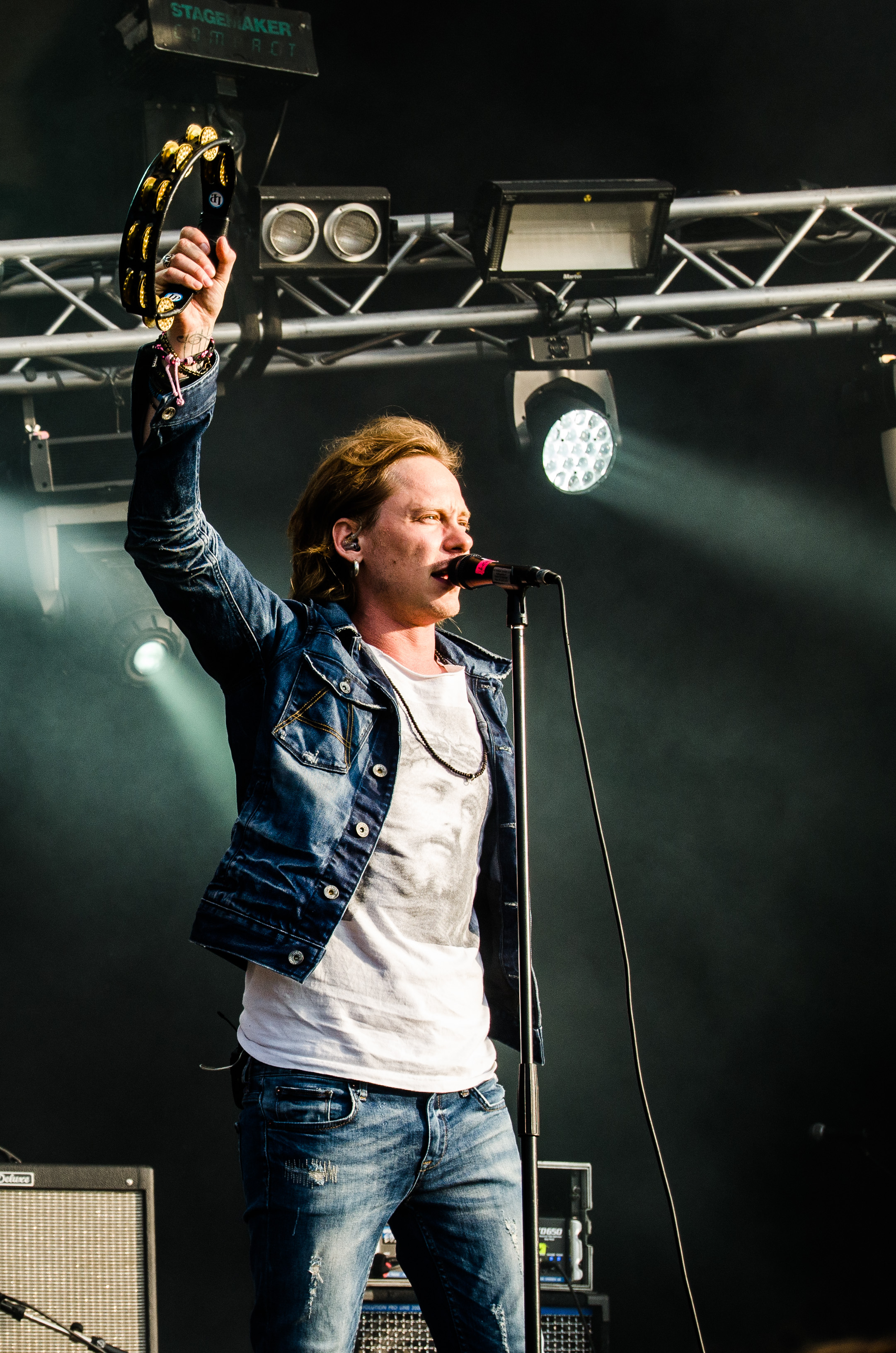
- Jonne Aaron in 2013
- Born: Jonne Aaron Liimatainen; 30 August 1983 (age 43); Tampere, Finland
- Occupation: Singer
- Years active: 1997–present

Jonne Aaron Liimatainen (born 30 August 1983) is a Finnish singer. He became one of the most prominent teen idols and rock stars in Finland in the 2000s. He is known as the lead vocalist, composer, lyricist, and frontman of the Finnish glam rock band Negative.

In 2012, Aaron took part in the inaugurating series of Vain elämää, the Finnish version of The Best Singers series broadcast on Finnish Nelonen commercial television channel.

== Personal life ==
Jonne Aaron was born in Tampere, and is the brother of Ville Liimatainen, lead vocalist of the Finnish glam rock band Flinch. He dated Star Wreck: In the Pirkinning actress Tiina Routamaa for nine years, but they separated in the summer of 2011.

== Discography ==
=== Albums ===
with Negative

Solo

Year	Title	Chart
Year	Title	FIN
2013	Onnen vuodet	1
2014	Risteyksessä	4
2019	Tiikerin raidat	5

=== Singles ===
with Negative

Solo

Year	Title	Charts	Album
Year	Title	FIN	Album
2013	"Taivas itkee hiljaa"	—	Onnen vuodet

Featured in

Year	Title	Charts	Album
Year	Title	FIN	Album
2012	"Anna mä meen"	1	Sokka irti

=== Other charted songs ===
Year	Title	Charts	Album
Year	Title	FIN	Album
2012	"Kylmä ilman sua"	8	Vain elämää, Season 1, Kaija Koo Day
2012	"Satulinna"	20	Vain elämää, Season 1, Jari Sillanpää Day
