= 2080-luvulla =

Single by Sanni

from the album Lelu
- Released: 13 February 2015
- Genre: Pop
- Length: 4:18
- Label: Warner Music Finland
- Songwriter: Sanni Kurkisuo
- Producer: Hank Solo

Sanni singles chronology
"Hakuna matata" (2014)	"2080-luvulla" (2015)

"2080-luvulla" (English: In the 2080s) is a song by Finnish singer-songwriter Sanni and the lead single from her second studio album, Lelu. It was released on 13 February 2015 through Warner Music Finland, while its music video was released on 5 March. Its lyrics were written by Sanni, while the song was produced by Hank Solo. The song holds the record for longest consecutive run at number-one on the Finnish airplay charts of all-time with eleven weeks.

== Charts ==
=== Weekly charts ===
Chart (2015)	Peak position
Finland (Suomen virallinen lista)	3
Finland Download (Latauslista)	1
Finland Airplay (Radiosoittolista)	1
