= Käännän sivuu =

Studio album by Cheek
- Released: 18 May 2005
- Label: Sony Music Entertainment
- Producer: MGI, Antti Turpeinen, Jake Kilpiö, M. Colliander, Coma

Cheek chronology
Avaimet mun kulmille (2004)	Käännän sivuu (2005)	Kasvukipuja (2007)

Singles from Käännän sivuu
- 1. "Liiku" Released: 2005; 2. "Nostan kytkintä" Released: 2005; 3. "Täältä sinne"

Käännän sivuu is the second studio album by Finnish rapper Cheek. It was released on 18 May 2005. The album peaked at number 17 on the Official Finnish Album Chart.

== Track listing ==
No.	Title	Length
1.	"Taas askeleen edellä"	3:57
2.	"Nostan kytkintä"	3:23
3.	"Leija kaupungin yllä"	3:49
4.	"Liiku" (featuring Jonna)	3:17
5.	"Valmis"	3:18
6.	"Täältä sinne"	3:58
7.	"Omenavarkaat" (featuring Herrasmiesliiga)	3:35
8.	"Herätys"	3:46
9.	"Kun sä nukut"	3:59
10.	"Käännän sivuu"	4:07
11.	"Reissumies" (featuring Aspekti)	4:25
12.	"Lyijykynä"	3:39
13.	"Tappiin asti"	3:17
14.	"Tuuaa kuumaa 2005" (featuring Herrasmiesliiga)	3:39

== Charts ==
Chart (2005)	Peak position
Finnish Albums Chart	17

== Release history ==
Region	Date	Format	Label
Finland	18 May 2005	CD, Digital download	Sony Music Entertainment
