= Jare Henrik Tiihonen =

Studio album by Cheek
- Released: 13 May 2009
- Label: Rähinä Records
- Producer: MGI, MMEN, Joonas Jylhä, Elastinen, Coach Beats

Cheek chronology
Kuka sä oot (2008)	Jare Henrik Tiihonen (2009)	Jare Henrik Tiihonen 2 (2010)

Singles from Jare Henrik Tiihonen
- 1. "Jos mä oisin sä" Released: 15 April 2009; 2. "Mitä tänne jää" Released: 5 August 2009

Jare Henrik Tiihonen is the fifth studio album by Finnish rapper Cheek. It was released on 13 May 2009. The album peaked at number one on the Official Finnish Album Chart.

== Track listing ==
No.	Title	Length
1.	"Mitä tänne jää"	3:53
2.	"Fresh" (featuring Sini)	3:54
3.	"Jos mä oisin sä"	3:51
4.	"Kaikki hyvin" (featuring Lord Est)	4:16
5.	"Tytöt" (featuring Herrasmiesliiga)	3:28
6.	"Haurasta" (featuring Tasis)	3:37
7.	"Viihdyttäjä"	3:59
8.	"Pelkkää puhetta"	3:37
9.	"Kaltevaa pintaa" (featuring Sami Saari)	3:47
10.	"Jare Henrik Tiihonen"	4:32
11.	"Herrasmiesliiga" (featuring Herrasmiesliiga & Mika Tauriainen)	4:12
12.	"Jää" (featuring J. Ahola)	3:57

== Charts ==
Chart (2009)	Peak position
Finnish Albums Chart	1

== Release history ==
Region	Date	Format	Label
Finland	13 May 2009	CD, digital download	Rähinä Records
