= Avaimet mun kulmille =

Studio album by Cheek
- Released: 31 May 2004
- Label: Sony Music Entertainment
- Producer: Ii, MGI, Jake Kilpiö, OCSID, Antti Turpeinen, Cheek, Tiedemies

Cheek chronology
Pitää pystyy elää (2003)	Avaimet mun kulmille (2004)	Käännän sivuu (2005)

Singles from Avaimet mun kulmille
- 1. "Avaimet mun kiesiin" Released: 3 March 2004; 2. "Raplaulajan vapaapäivä" Released: 2004; 3. "Avaimet mun himaan" Released: 2004

Avaimet mun kulmille is the debut studio album by Finnish rapper Cheek. It was released on 31 May 2004. The album peaked at number 19 on the Official Finnish Album Chart.

== Track listing ==
No.	Title	Length
1.	"Sata lasissa"	3:47
2.	"Avaimet mun kiesiin" (featuring MasQ)	3:40
3.	"Tultiin nähtiin voitettiin" (featuring 5th Element, MGI & Monte "Shon" Cummings)	5:12
4.	"Mökkireissu"	3:30
5.	"Raplaulajan vapaapäivä" (featuring Brädi & Pappa)	4:03
6.	"Nyt skarppina"	3:53
7.	"Ruusuillatanssimista"	3:44
8.	"Avaimet hukassa"	4:05
9.	"Sylkäsy"	3:20
10.	"Avaimet mun himaan" (featuring Idän Ihme & Tupla-S)	3:42
11.	"Mitä hä!?" (featuring TS)	3:46
12.	"Suu kii"	4:46
13.	"Sikaryhmä"	3:49
14.	"Pelihelvetti" (featuring Herrasmiesliiga)	3:44

== Charts ==
Chart (2004)	Peak position
Finnish Albums Chart	19

== Release history ==
Region	Date	Format	Label
Finland	31 May 2004	CD	Sony Music Entertainment
