= Timantit on ikuisia =

Single by Cheek

from the album Kuka muu muka
- Released: 9 August 2013
- Genre: Hip hop
- Length: 3:40
- Label: Warner Music Finland & Liiga Music Oy

Cheek singles chronology
| "Jossu" (2013) | "Timantit on ikuisia" (2013) | "Äärirajoille" (2014) |

"Timantit on ikuisia" is a song by Finnish rapper Cheek. The song serves as the second single from Cheek's tenth studio album Kuka muu muka, released on 20 September 2013. The single and the accompanying music video, directed by Jere Hietala, were released on 9 August 2013. "Timantit on ikuisia" became the Cheek's eighth number-one single on the Finnish Singles Chart, where it debuted at number one. On 23 August 2013, it also became the first-ever song by a Finnish artist to rank among the 100 most-played songs of the day on Spotify.

== Charts ==
| Chart (2013) | Peak position |
|---|---|
| Finland (Suomen virallinen lista) | 1 |
