= Jonna Pirinen =

Singer/songwriter, dancer, dance choreographer, actress

Jonna Christensen (née Pirinen, born 28 December 1982), better known by her stage name Jonna, is a pop and R&B singer/songwriter from Finland. She has released three albums, over ten singles and several music videos.

She became known in 2002 for her participation to the Finnish edition of talent scouting show Popstars, where she was selected as fourth member of the girls' group Gimmel. However, after less than a month she quit from the group and embarked on a solo career.

Jonna was successful in her solo career, but wanted to start singing in English but her record label Sony BMG did not support her proposal to now focus on English-language songs. As a result, the contract ended. Jonna decided to move to Los Angeles to start working on her English-language album and find new influences for her music. After a stay of one and a half years in Los Angeles, she returned to Finland.

Back in Finland, in December 2010, Jonna released her first independently produced song Puppets. On 14 January 2011, she participated with Puppets to the first semi-final for the Finnish national selection for the Eurovision Song Contest 2011. She released her second single "Simple life" from her upcoming album in June 2011 and during the summer of 2011 she played the female lead part in a summer theater production called Rölli ja Metsänhenki (The Troll and the Forest Spirit) in Joensuu, Finland.

Jonna has previously performed in the musicals Hair (2003) and Grease (2002–2003) and Hello Dolly! (2000) and she was hosting a TV-show called Voice out! on Yle TV2 in 2004. She has worked as a backup dancer for a dance artist called K-System and performed as a dancer in show dance groups "Step up" (2001–2002) and "Cat people" (1996–2001). She has won three Finnish championships with show dance and hip-hop group formations and was the best female solo dancer in the disco and show dance competition in 2002.

Jonna has worked as a dance teacher since 1996 in such dance schools as "Pohjois-Karjalan tanssiopisto" and "Helsingin tanssiopisto". She has been making dance choreographies to her music videos such as "Tyytyväinen" ("Pleased"), "Kaikki talossa" ("All in the house"), and "Puppets".

Jonna has written all the lyrics and melodies to her songs. She has worked with such songwriters as Jim Holvay (The Buckinghams), Miika Colliander (Husky Rescue), Nikki Forova and Jukka Immonen.

Jonna became a member of the Church of Jesus Christ of Latter-day Saints at the end of 2003.

She currently lives in San Francisco.

Her most recent release is an album aimed at the American market, Sound Mind.

== Discography ==
=== Albums ===
| Vuosi | Tiedot | Listasijoitus |
| Vuosi | Tiedot | Suomen virallinen albumilista |
|---|---|---|
| 2003 | Kaksnolla: Ensimmäinen studioalbumi; Julkaistu: 11. kesäkuuta 2003; Formaatti: CD | #7 |
| 2004 | Kasvot vedessä: Toinen studioalbumi; Julkaistu: 1. tammikuuta 2004; Formaatti: CD | #27 |
| 2006 | Lähempänä totuutta: Kolmas studioalbumi; Julkaistu: 13. huhtikuuta 2006; Formaatti: CD | #32 |
| 2009 | Collections: Ensimmäinen kokoelma-albumi; Julkaistu: 5. tammikuuta 2009; Formaatti: CD | – |
| 2015 | Sound Mind: Ensimmäinen englanninkielinen albumi; Julkaistu: 21 August 2015; Formaatti: CD | – |

=== Singles ===
- Tyytyväinen (2003)
- Ei heru (mukana Elastinen) (2003)
- Kaikki talossa (2003)
- Perhonen (2004, radiopromo)
- Paljon tarjolla (2004)
- Sateen jälkeen (2004)
- Kasvot Vedessä (2005, promo)
- Minä vs. Minä (2005)
- Jäässä (2006)
- Vive La Vida (mukana Norlan) (2006, radiopromo)
- Yhdessä (2006, radiopromo)
- Summer Jam (2007)
- Puppets (2010)
- Simple Life (2011)
- Still Breathing (2014)
- Smile (2015)

=== Videos ===
- Tyytyväinen (2003)
- Kaikki talossa (2003)
- Sateen jälkeen (2005)
- Jäässä (2006, ohjaus Lauri Haukkamaa)
- Puppets (2010)
- Smile (2015)

=== Guest shots ===
| Artisti | Kappale | Albumilta | Muut vierailijat | Vuosi |
|---|---|---|---|---|
| Cheek | "Liiku" | Käännän sivuu | | 2005 |
| Kapasiteettiyksikkö | "Pitkin seinii" | Susijengi | | 2006 |
| Cheddar | "Summer Jam" | Superb Character | | 2007 |
| Cheek | "Älä" | Kasvukipuja | | 2007 |
| Lord Est | "Mitä etit" | Tulin teitä muistuttaan | | 2008 |
