= Kuka muu muka =

Studio album by Cheek
- Released: 20 September 2013
- Language: Finnish
- Label: Warner Music Finland & Liiga Music Oy

Cheek chronology
Sokka irti (2012)	Kuka muu muka (2013)	Alpha Omega (2015)

Singles from Kuka muu muka
- 1. "Jossu" Released: 31 May 2013; 2. "Timantit on ikuisia" Released: 9 August 2013

Kuka muu muka is the eighth studio album by Finnish rapper Cheek. Released on 20 September 2013, the album peaked at number one on the Finnish Albums Chart. On 31 October 2014, the album was rereleased as Kuka muu muka – Stadion Edition, a CD/DVD/Blu-ray combo with three extra songs.

== Singles ==
Two singles preceded the album; "Jossu" was released on 31 May 2013 and "Timantit on ikuisia" on 9 August 2013. Both songs peaked at number one on the Finnish Singles Chart. Upon the release, Kuka muu muka spawned seven more songs to appear on the chart, making Cheek the first artist ever to occupy nine positions on the chart in a single week. One of those songs, "Parempi mies", was also released as a promotional single in October 2013.

== Track listing ==
=== Standard version ===
No.	Title	Length
1.	"Älä pyydä mitään"	4:38
2.	"Timantit on ikuisia"	3:40
3.	"Vihaajat vihaa" (featuring Kalle Kinos)	3:58
4.	"Jossu" (featuring Jukka Poika)	3:12
5.	"Kuka muu muka"	3:39
6.	"Ota mut kiinni"	3:52
7.	"Fiiliksissä" (featuring Diandra)	3:24
8.	"Omat säännöt"	3:28
9.	"Niille joil on paha olla"	4:15
10.	"Parempi mies" (featuring Samuli Edelmann)	4:03
11.	"Profeetat" (featuring Elastinen)	4:00

== Charts and certifications ==
=== Charts ===
Kuka muu muka

Chart (2013)	Peak position
Finnish Albums (Suomen virallinen lista)	1

Kuka muu muka – Stadion Edition

Chart (2014)	Peak position
Finnish Albums (Suomen virallinen lista)	3

=== Certifications ===
Region	Certification	Certified units/sales
Finland (Musiikkituottajat)	3× Platinum	75,836

== Release history ==
Region	Date	Format	Label
Finland	20 September 2013	CD, digital download	Warner Music Finland & Liiga Music Oy

== See also ==
- List of number-one albums of 2013 (Finland)
