= Jos mä oon oikee =

Single by Sanni

from the album Sotke mut
- Released: 18 June 2013
- Genre: Pop
- Length: 4:08
- Label: Warner Music Finland
- Songwriter(s): Sanni Kurkisuo
- Producer(s): Hank Solo

Sanni singles chronology
"Prinsessoja ja astronautteja" (2013)	"Jos mä oon oikee" (2013)	"Me ei olla enää me" (2013)

"Jos mä oon oikee" (English: If I'm real) song by Finnish singer-songwriter Sanni and the second single from her debut studio album Sotke mut. It was released on 18 June 2013 through Warner Music Finland. The song's music video was published on 4 July 2013 and was filmed in Helsinki. The song peaked at number nineteen on Finland's airplay and downloads charts, but did not chart on their singles chart.

== Charts ==
=== Weekly charts ===
Chart (2015)	Peak position
Finland Download (Latauslista)	19
Finland Airplay (Radiosoittolista)	19
