= Mitä tänne jää =

Single by Cheek

from the album Jare Henrik Tiihonen
- Released: 5 August 2009
- Genre: Rap
- Length: 3:53
- Label: Rähinä Records
- Songwriter(s): Erin Helena Maureen Anttila, Juha-Matti Christian Penttinen, Ossi Antti Riita, Jare Henrik Tiihonen
- Producer(s): MMEN

Cheek singles chronology
"Jos mä oisin sä" (2009)	"Mitä tänne jää" (2009)	"Jippikayjei" (2010)

"Mitä tänne jää" is a song by Finnish rapper Cheek. Released on 5 August 2009, the song serves as the second single from Cheek's fifth studio album Jare Henrik Tiihonen. "Mitä tänne jää" peaked at number 17 on the Finnish Singles Chart. In 2012, Finnish singer Erin reached the number one position on the same chart with her version of the song.

== Chart performance ==
Chart (2009)	Peak position
Finland (Suomen virallinen lista)	17
