= Jos mä oisin sä =

Single by Cheek

from the album Jare Henrik Tiihonen
- Released: 15 April 2009
- Genre: Rap
- Length: 3:51
- Label: Rähinä Records
- Producer(s): MMEN

Cheek singles chronology
"Kanssa tai ilman" (2008)	"Jos mä oisin sä" (2009)	"Mitä tänne jää" (2009)

"Jos mä oisin sä" is a song by Finnish rapper Cheek. Released on 15 April 2009, the song serves as the first single from Cheek's fifth studio album Jare Henrik Tiihonen. "Jos mä oisin sä" peaked at number one on the Finnish Singles Chart.

== Chart performance ==
Chart (2009)	Peak position
Finland (The Official Finnish Singles Chart)	1
