= Yasmine Yamajako =

Finnish singer

Yasmine Laurel Alizée Yamajako is a Finnish singer. She has studied at the Helsinki Pop & Jazz Conservatory. In 2008, Yamajako played the role of Gabriella in the Helsinki City Theatre adaptation of High School Musical on Stage!. Yamajako appeared as a featured singer in a song Syypää sun hymyyn by a Finnish rapper Cheek. Yamajako's mother is Finnish. From her father's side, she has Beninese roots. Yamajako's aunt is the singer Laura Voutilainen.

== Dubbing ==
- Camp Rock - Ella
- Monster High - Additional voices
- Camp Rock 2: The Final Jam - Ella
- Barbie: Princess Charm School - Portia
- Barbie: A Perfect Christmas - Skipper
- Mia and Me - Mia
- Barbie: Life in the Dreamhouse - Skipper, Raquelle, Additional voices
- My Little Pony: Friendship is Magic - Trixie, Cherilee, Additional voices
- Barbie: The Princess and the Popstar - Keira
- Hotel Transylvania - Mavis Dracula
- Ever After High - Cedar Wood
- Sheriff Callie's Wild West - Toby
- Moana/Vaiana - Moana/Vaiana
