= Erin Anttila =

Finnish singer

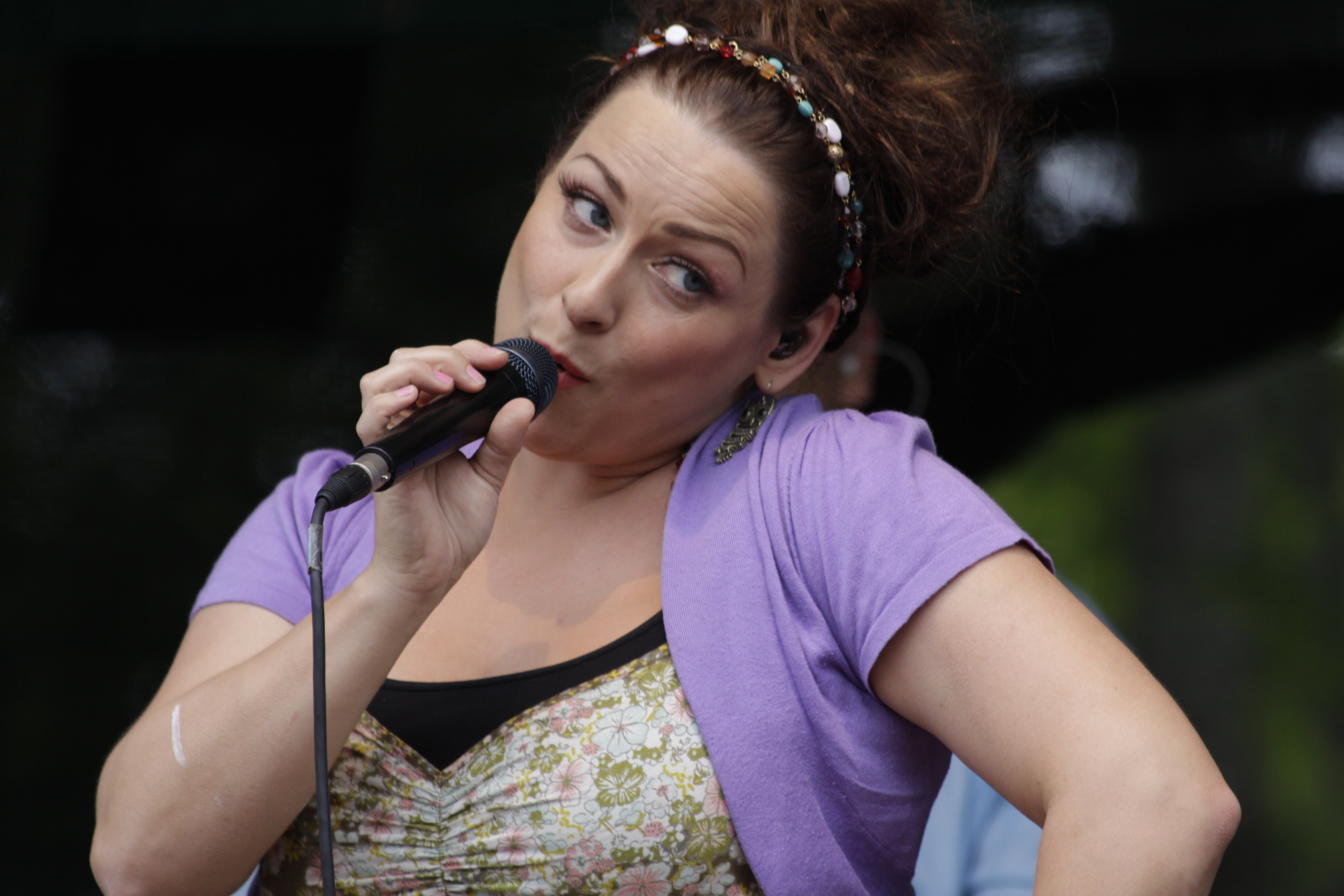

Background information
- Birth name: Erin Helena Maureen Koivisto
- Also known as: Erin
- Born: 2 July 1977 (age 47)
- Origin: Helsinki, Finland
- Genres: Folk
- Occupation(s): Musician, vocalist
- Instrument(s): Vocals, guitar
- Years active: 2008–present

Erin Helena Maureen Anttila (née Koivisto; born 2 July 1977), better known as simply Erin, is a Finnish singer who rose to fame with the pop group Nylon Beat.

== Early life ==
Erin Anttila was born in Helsinki, Finland, and is of Irish and Finnish descent, with an Irish mother and Finnish father. When she was three years old, her family moved to Ireland, where she began primary school. She finished school in Finland when the family returned three years later.

== Career ==
At seventeen, she formed Nylon Beat with Jonna Kosonen. They became famous after their appearance on "Kiitorata" (Launch Pad), a television programme presenting new Finnish solo artists and bands. The show was broadcast on MTV3, which was then Finland's most-watched commercial TV channel. Nylon Beat participated in the Finnish Eurovision Song Contest qualifying rounds in 1998 and in 2000.

In 2004, Erin and former Nylon Beat guitarist Vesa Anttila, moved to Wicklow in Ireland for a year, and studied music. The couple married on 22 August 2005.

After returning to Finland in 2004, Erin started a solo career. In April 2008, she released her first solo single, "Sarah". Her debut album was originally scheduled for release in the autumn of 2008, but was delayed. After an abortive attempt to record the songs in English, the first Finnish language solo single, "Vanha nainen hunningolla" (lit. "An old woman gone wayward") was released on 31 January 2011. A full album, Hunningolla, was released on 25 May 2011.

== Personal life ==
Anttila is Catholic.

== Discography ==
=== Albums ===
Year	Album	Peak positions	Certification
Year	Album	FIN	Certification
2011	Hunningolla	4	2× Platinum
2013	Sä osaat!	1	Platinum
2016	Seliseli	10	
2022	Miljoona vastausta	3	

=== Singles ===
Year	Single	Peak positions	Album
Year	Single	FIN	Album
2008	"Sarah"	–	
2011	"Vanha nainen hunningolla"	8	
2011	"Popeda"	15	
2012	"Vanha sydän"	–	
2012	"On elämä laina"	–	
2012	"Mitä tänne jää"	1	
2012	"Vapaa"	8	
2012	"Vasten auringon siltaa"	15	
2013	"Ei taida tietää tyttö"	9	
2020	"Yhtenä sunnuntaina"	5	
2021	"Niinku koko ajan"	20	

Featured in

Year	Single	Peak positions	Album
Year	Single	FIN	Album
2004	"Hypothetically" (with Lyfe Jennings)		
2012	"Siskoni" (with Laura Närhi)	–	
