= Sami Saari =

Finnish soul musician (born 1962)

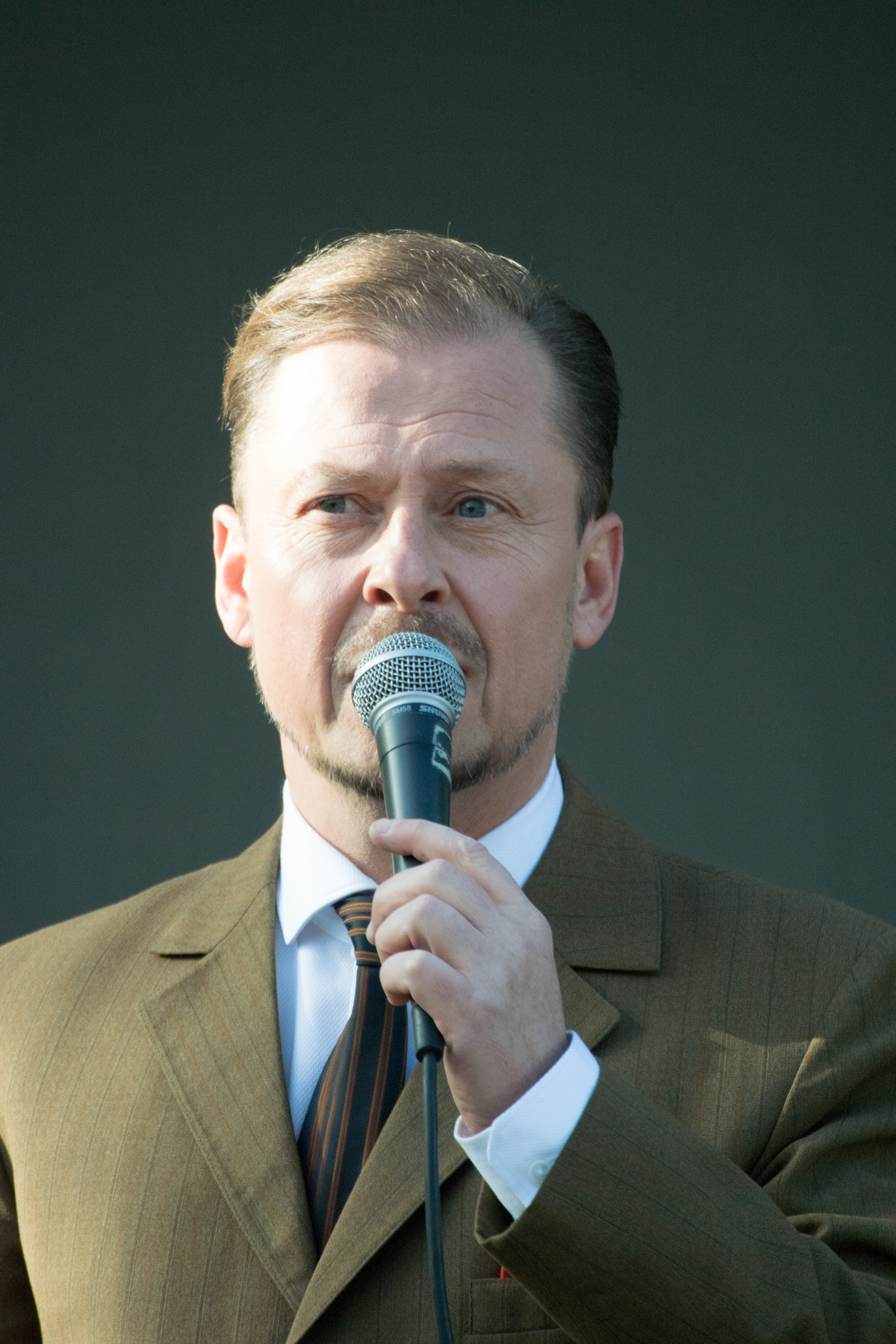

Background information
- Born: 21 January 1962 (age 64)
- Origin: Tampere, Finland
- Genres: Soul, funk, blues
- Instrument: Vocals
- Years active: 1982–present

Sami-Jussi Saari (born 21 January 1962) is a Finnish soul musician. To date, Saari has released six solo studio albums, after having previously been part of such groups as Veeti & the Velvets, Aki Sirkesalo ja Lemmen jättiläiset and Sami Saari & Cosmosonic. Saari has often been labelled as the "King of Finnish Soul", but he has also worked with pop, rock and rap musicians such as Anna Puu, Elastinen and Cheek.

== Selected discography ==
=== Solo albums ===
Year	Title	Peak position
Year	Title	FIN
1997	Do re mi	20
1999	Samtheman	15
2002	Turisti	24
2003	Hits (compilation)	39
2005	Neljäs	—
2009	Vapaa	38
2012	Soulklassikot	38

=== Singles ===
Year	Title	Peak position
Year	Title	FIN
1999	"Iisimmin"	12
1999	"Pienet hetket"	18
2007	"Sun täytyy" (Cheek featuring Sami Saari)	1
2013	"Kyyneleet" (Cheek featuring Sami Saari)	20
