= Cheek (rapper) =

Finnish rapper

Cheek Jare Henrik Tiihonen
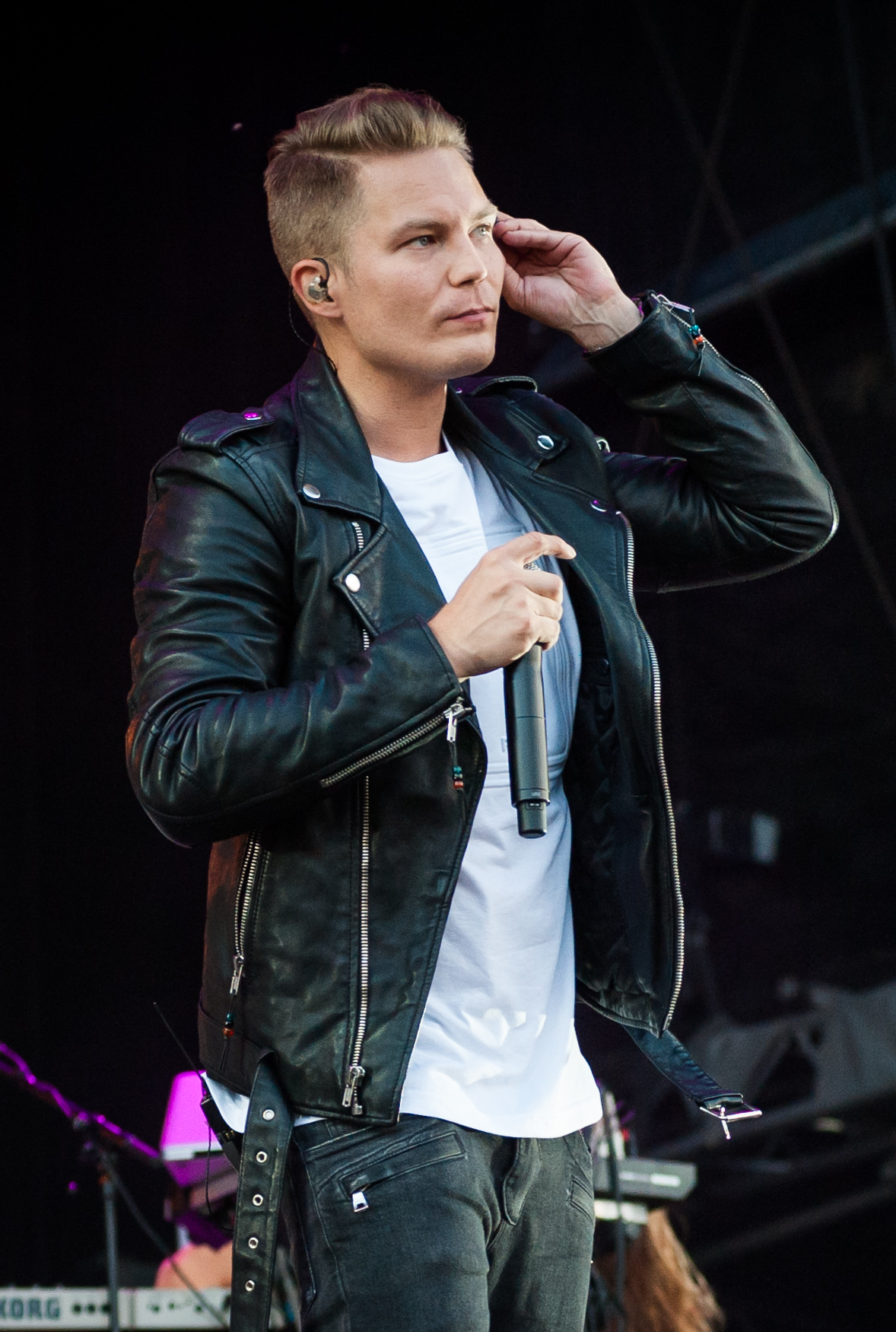
- Cheek at the Ilosaarirock festival in 2016

Background information
- Born: Jare Henrik Tiihonen; 22 December 1981 (age 44); Vantaa, Finland
- Origin: Lahti, Finland
- Genres: Hip hop; pop
- Occupations: Rapper; singer; songwriter; record producer
- Instrument: Vocals
- Years active: 1998–2018
- Labels: Sony; Alarm; Rähinä; Liiga; Warner

Jare Henrik Tiihonen (born 22 December 1981 Vantaa, Finland), better known by his stage name Cheek, is a Finnish former rapper and singer. During his career, he released twelve studio albums, of which three have gone multi-platinum, two platinum and three gold. Four of the albums have reached number one on the Official Finnish Album Chart.

In November 2017, he announced that he would end his career in August 2018.

== Discography ==
- Human & Beast (2001)
- 50/50 (2002)
- Pitää pystyy elää (2003)
- Avaimet mun kulmille (2004)
- Käännän sivuu (2005)
- Kasvukipuja (2007)
- Kuka sä oot (2008)
- Jare Henrik Tiihonen (2009)
- Jare Henrik Tiihonen 2 (2010)
- Sokka irti (2012)
- Kuka muu muka (2013)
- Alpha Omega (2015)

== Certificates ==
- Kuka muu muka - 8× platinum
- Sokka Irti - 5× platinum
- Alpha Omega - 3× platinum
- Jare Henrik Tiihonen - platinum
- Jare Henrik Tiihonen 2 - platinum
- Kuka sä oot - gold
- Avaimet mun kulmille - gold
- Käännän sivuu - gold

== Achievements ==
- Most listened-to Finnish-language artist of all time on Spotify
- First Finnish artist to sell out the Helsinki Olympic Stadium
- Third most Emma Awards won by an individual

== See also ==
- List of best-selling music artists in Finland
