= Finnish hip-hop =

Music genre

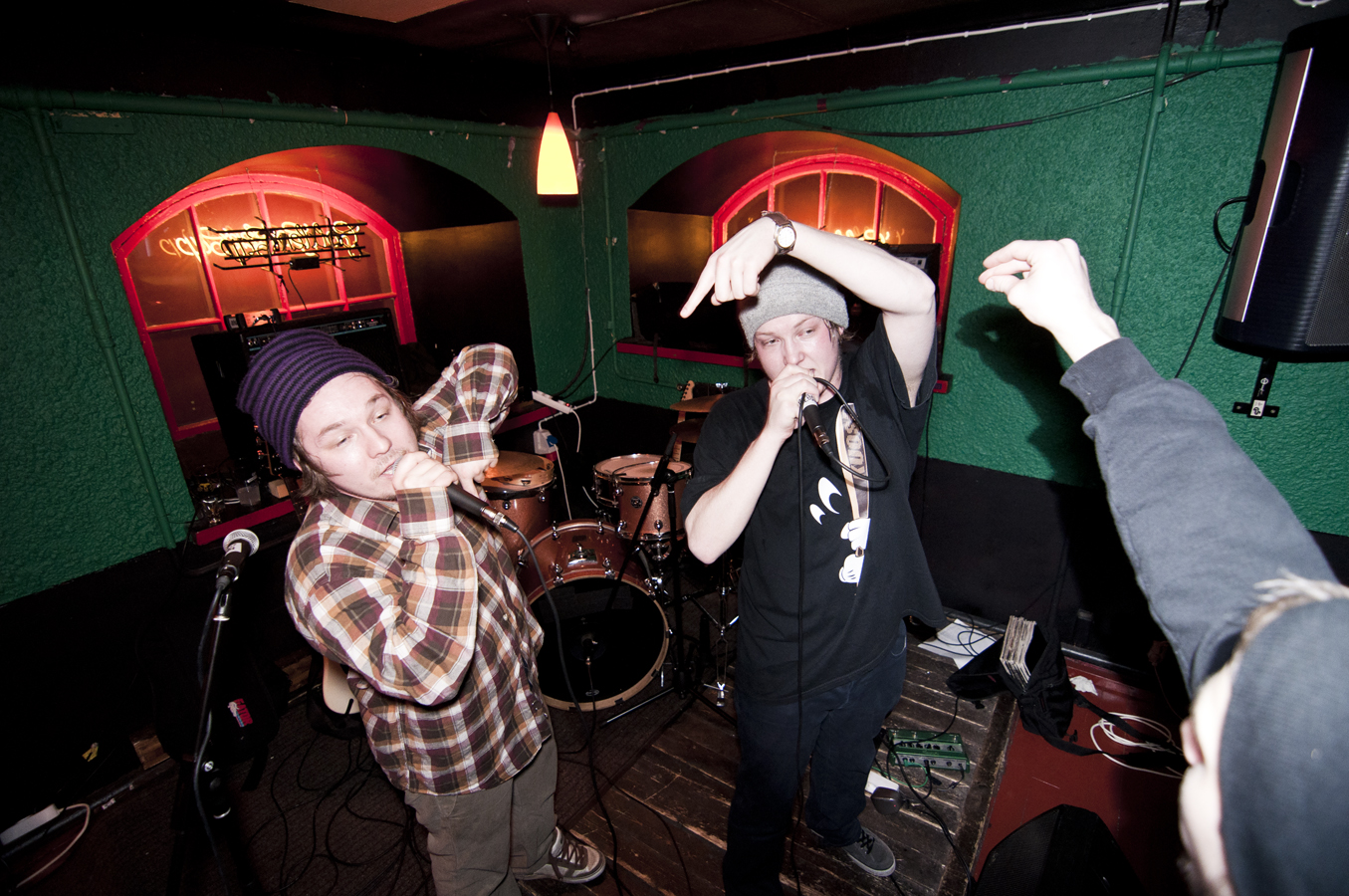
Rappers Are & Stepa

Finnish hip-hop or rap (Finnish: suomiräp, räp) or (suomirap, rap) is a variant of hip-hop from Finland. The rapping (räppääminen) is mainly done in Finnish. Many rappers use Helsinki slang words; general slang and Finnish dialects are used too by some artists. Many early rappers (Finnish: räppäri) used English. Some Finnish rap was already recorded in the early 1980s and some popular artists 1990s but it was not until the 2000s that it finally reached mainstream popularity.

The first recorded Finnish rap song was "I'm Young, Beautiful and Natural" in English, which was made by an artist called General Njassa in 1983. Rap music in Finnish made its first breakthrough in 1990 when groups Raptori and Pääkköset and artist Nikke T got their records to Finnish charts. Raptori in particular became a nationwide phenomenon. These artists had a style greatly different when compared to American rap music. Their music was highly influenced by the dance-pop of the 1980s and their approach to music was largely humoristic. Later Finnish rappers tend to despise this wave of the early 1990s. Niko Toiskallio (Nikke T) himself has later stated that he regrets his humoristic dance-influenced rap recordings and he claims that so-called humour-rap deprived the credibility of Finnish rap scene which did not recover until many years later in the late 1990s.

== Notable artists ==
Mainstream rap artists and crews

- Eevil Stöö
- Mikael Gabriel
- JVG
- Gettomasa
- Cheek
- Uniikki
- Teflon Brothers
- Mäkki
- Elastinen
- Spekti
- Daco Junior
- Ezkimo
- Nikke Ankara
- Kapasiteettiyksikkö
- Petri Nygård
- Redrama
- Juju
- Pyhimys
- Kube
- Heikki Kuula
- Cledos

Underground rap artists and crews

- Amoc
- Notkea Rotta
- Steen1
- OG Ikonen
- Paleface
- Raimo
- Ruudolf
- Ruger Hauer
- Iso H
- SMC Lähiörotat
