= Diktaattorimies =

2013 studio album by Spekti

Studio album by Spekti
- Released: 18 October 2013
- Label: Rähinä Records
- Producer: Tasis; Elastinen; MGI; Setä Tamu; HeavyWeight

Spekti chronology
Diktaattorimies (2013)	Macho Fantastico (2014)

Singles from Diktaattorimies
- 1. "Mogausmehuu" Released: 2010; 2. "Teen mitä haluun" Released: 2013; 3. "Juomalaulu" Released: 2013

Diktaattorimies is the debut studio album by Finnish rapper Spekti. It was released on 18 October 2013. The album peaked at number 20 on the Official Finnish Album Chart.

== Track listing ==
No.	Title	Length
1.	"Diktaattorimies" (featuring Tasis)	3:39
2.	"Teen mitä haluun" (featuring Setä Tamu)	3:45
3.	"Räikkösluokan jahti"	3:39
4.	"Juomalaulu" (featuring Tasis)	3:34
5.	"Vinkkii DJ:lle"	3:39
6.	"Juppi" (featuring Cheek)	3:19
7.	"Mogausmehuu" (featuring Tasis)	3:15
8.	"Eniten vituttaa kaikki" (featuring KT & Wretch)	4:38
9.	"Pub Pahamieli" (featuring Timo Pieni Huijaus & Eetee)	3:30
10.	"Kaiken mestari"	3:15
11.	"No ei siinä" (featuring Tasis)	3:17
12.	"Hulluuteen" (featuring Elastinen, Uniikki & Tasis)	3:39
13.	"Diktaattorimies (outro)"	1:25

== Charts ==
Chart (2013)	Peak position
Finnish Albums Chart	20

== Release history ==
Region	Date	Format	Label
Finland	18 October 2013	CD, Digital download	Rähinä Records
