= Macho Fantastico =

2014 studio album by Spekti

Studio album by Spekti
- Released: 5 December 2014
- Label: Rähinä Records

Spekti chronology
Diktaattorimies (2013)	Macho Fantastico (2014)

Singles from Macho Fantastico
- 1. "Macho Fantastico" Released: 21 November 2014

Macho Fantastico is the second studio album by Finnish rapper Spekti. Released on 5 December 2014, the album peaked at number 18 on the Official Finnish Album Chart. The titular song, released as the lead single, peaked at number one on the Finnish Singles Chart in December 2014.

== Track listing ==
No.	Title	Length
1.	"Macho Fantastico intro"	1:11
2.	"Macho Fantastico" (featuring Tasis)	3:21
3.	"Upeet"	3:32
4.	"Parempia päiviä" (featuring Kim Herold)	3:29
5.	"Mä en tiiä siit" (featuring Elastinen)	3:31
6.	"Hanskast" (featuring Tasis)	3:22
7.	"Leipoo" (featuring Mikael Gabriel)	3:32
8.	"Scatman" (featuring Tasis)	3:12
9.	"Se ei mee niin" (featuring Emmi)	3:49
10.	"Ikin vittu kuullukkaa" (featuring KT & Wretch)	4:24
11.	"Täysilllä päätyyn" (featuring Elastinen, Tasis, TPH & Uniikki)	3:17
12.	"Miks me lopetettais" (featuring Tasis & Emmi)	3:39
13.	"Macho Fantastico outro"	1:07

== Charts ==
Chart (2014–15)	Peak position
Finnish Albums (Suomen virallinen lista)	18

== Release history ==
Region	Date	Format	Label
Finland	3 December 2014	CD, Digital download	Rähinä Records
