= Mun maailma =

Studio album by Mikael Gabriel
- Released: 10 May 2013
- Label: Universal Music Group

Mikael Gabriel chronology
Pohjosen poika (2011)	Mun maailma (2013)	Versus (2015)

Mun maailma is the third studio album by Finnish rapper Mikael Gabriel. It was released on 10 May 2013. The album peaked at number 20 on the Official Finnish Album Chart.

== Track listing ==
No.	Title	Length
1.	"Déjà-vu"	3:36
2.	"Päästä mut pois" (featuring Diandra)	3:21
3.	"Mökille"	3:08
4.	"Elämästä irti"	3:47
5.	"Mun maailma"	4:12
6.	"Meijän äijii" (featuring Uniikki)	3:03
7.	"Kipua"	4:14
8.	"Ykspuolista rakkautta" (featuring Heikki Kuula)	2:58
9.	"[Skit]"	3:18
10.	"Filmi poikki" (featuring JVG)	3:16
11.	"Mitä mä teen tääl" (featuring Cheek)	3:23
12.	"Se tyttö"	3:40
13.	"Veden alla"	4:24

== Charts ==
Chart (2013)	Peak position
Finnish Albums Chart	20

== Release history ==
Region	Date	Format	Label
Finland	10 May 2013	CD, digital download	Universal Music Group
