= Aleksi Sariola =

Finnish actor, singer, and television presenter

Aleksi Juhani Sariola (born 22 March 1980), professionally sometimes also known as Illi, is a Finnish actor, singer, television presenter and director.

== Acting career ==
Sariola first became known as an actor when he played the character Ken Ojala in the Finnish television series Salatut elämät 2000–2004. He has appeared in such films as Pian on aamu (2005) and Tali-Ihantala 1944 (2007). On television, Sariola has been seen as a presenter in various programs, such as Buusteri, Ruuvari and Pientä pintaremonttia. In the latter two, he has served as a writer and producer. He is also one of the directors of the musical television show SuomiLOVE.

== Musical career ==
As a singer, Sariola uses the pseudonym Illi. Illi's first single "Punaista", released in 2005, reached number 12 on the Finnish Singles Chart. His debut album Kokoa mut followed in 2006. Illi wrote all the lyrics on the album, while the production was handled by Elastinen and Jukka Immonen. Illi has also appeared as a featured artist on several songs by artists such as Fintelligens, Elastinen, Redrama, Brädi and Cheek.

== Filmography ==
=== In films ===
- Pian on aamu (2005)
- Kummelin Jackpot (2006)
- Tali-Ihantala 1944 (2006)

=== On television ===
- Salatut elämät (2001–2005)
- Buusteri (2005–2007)
- Ruuvari (2008–present)
- Pientä pintaremonttia (2009–present)

== Selected discography ==
=== Albums ===
- Kokoa mut (2006)

=== Singles ===
- "Punaista" (2005)

=== As a featured artist ===
- "Vaan sil on väliä" by Fintelligens (2003)
- "En pyydä muuta" by Uniikki (2005)
- "Yksin mut en yksinäinen" by Kapasiteettiyksikkö (2006)
- "Lennän pois" by Elastinen (2006)
- "Tila haltuun" by Elastinen (2007)
- "Yhtenä iltana humalassa" by Steen1 (2007)
- "Kanssa tai ilman" by Cheek (2008)
- "Mä tarjoon" by Brädi (2010)
- "Ruusutarha" by Timo Pieni Huijaus (2010)
- "Katkeaa" by Flowboysfam (2011)
- "Pilviin" by Uniikki (2012)
- "Saturnus" by Brädi (2016)
