= Jos mä oisin sun mies =

Single by Jontte Valosaari featuring Elastinen

from the album Haastaja
- Released: 9 November 2012
- Recorded: 2012
- Genre: Urban pop
- Length: 3:22
- Label: EMI Finland
- Songwriter(s): Henri Lanz, Will Rappaport, Aleksi Sariola, Kimmo Laiho
- Producer(s): MGI & GoodWill / M-Eazy Music

Jontte Valosaari singles chronology
"Jos mä oisin sun mies" (2012)	"Haastaja" (2013)

"Jos mä oisin sun mies" is a song by a Finnish pop singer Jontte Valosaari. It is Valosaari's first solo single and the first single release from his debut album Haastaja, released in April 2013. The song features an appearance by rapper Elastinen who is also credited as one of the writers. The single and the accompanying music video, directed by Joonas Pulkkanen, were released on 9 November 2012.

Even though Valosaari's song is all about women and his musical style has an obvious appeal for them, he has stated that he does not want to get a reputation as a ladies' man or a heartbreaker.

== Chart performance ==
"Jos mä oisin sun mies" peaked at number two on the Official Finnish Singles Chart dated 11 January 2013.

Chart (2012–13)	Peak position
Finland (Suomen virallinen lista)	2
