= Kyösti Salokorpi =

Finnish songwriter and musician (born 1976)

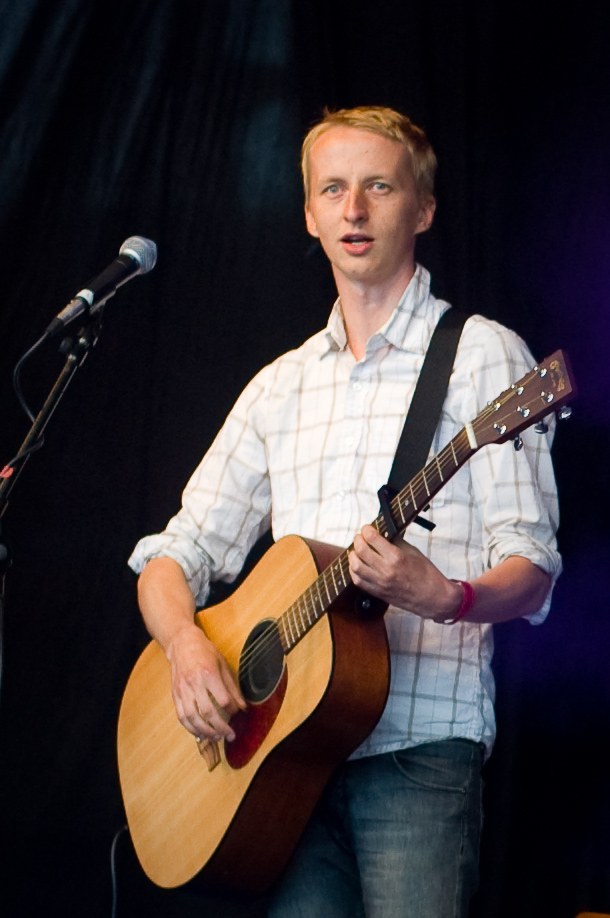
Kyösti Salokorpi performing at the Ilosaarirock festival on 12 July 2008 in Joensuu, Finland.

Kyösti Salokorpi (born 5 November 1976) is a Finnish songwriter and musician. He owns the production company Le Sound Royal.

Salokorpi has written and produced songs for various Finnish artist such as Jenni Vartiainen, Kristiina Wheeler, Kristiina Brask, Sini Sabotage, Robin and Teflon Brothers.

Salokorpi has cuts in Germany, Japan, South-Korea, Australia, Belgium and Russia. In spring 2012 the song ”Lady Luck”, co-written with Pessi Levonen, was third on Japan's single list.

Salokorpi has played guitar in Scandinavian Music Group and is the vocalist of his own band '’Atlético Kumpula '’. He has performed his own songs with his bands ’’Ihmepoika’’ and ’’ The Teenage Lesbians’’. Salokorpi has also produced Scandinavian Music Group's album "Hölmö rakkaus ylpeä sydän".

== Selected discography ==
=== Albums ===
- 2005: Scandinavian Music Group – Hölmö rakkaus ylpeä sydän (production) Sony BMG
- 2007: Manna – Sister (production) Suomen musiikki
- 2008: Scandinavian Music Group – Missä olet Laila? (musician) Sony Music
- 2009: Scandinavian Music Group – Palatkaa Pariisiin (musician) Sony Music
- 2009: Leki & The Sweet Mints (BELGIA) – Leki & The Sweet Mints (composition, production)
- 2011: Scandinavian Music Group – Manner (musician) Sony Music
- 2012: Kristiina Wheeler – Sirpaleista koottu (production) Universal Music
- 2012: Atlético Kumpula – Puutarhajuhlat (co-writer, production, vocals) Fullsteam Records
- 2013: Atlético Kumpula – Pitkä matka kotiin (co-writer, production, vocals) Fullsteam Records
- 2013: Robin – Boom Kah (co-writer, production) Universal Music
- 2014: Scandinavian Music Group – Terminal 2 (muusikko) Sony Music

=== Singles ===
- 2006: Annika Eklund – Shanghain valot (lyrics) Warner Music Finland
- 2007: Kristiina Brask – Nyt mä meen (co-writer) HMC
- 2008: Mikael Konttinen – Milloin (lyrics) Universal Music
- 2008: Jenni Vartiainen – Mustaa kahvia (composition, lyrics) Warner Music Finland
- 2009: Scandinavian Music Group – Näin minä vihellän matkallani (adaptation) Sony Music
- 2011: Kristiina Wheleer – Ihanaa (production) Universal Music
- 2012: Atlético Kumpula – Me kuulutaan yhteen (co-writer, production, vocals) Fullsteam Records
- 2013: Atlético Kumpula – Paperilyhty (co-writer) Fullsteam Records
- 2013: Atlético Kumpula – Annabella (composition, lyrics, production, vocals) Fullsteam Records
- 2014: Sini Sabotage – Kaikkihan me ollaan prinsessoi (composition) Universal Music
- 2014: Teflon Brothers – Maradona (kesä '86) (co-writer) Johanna Kustannus
- 2014: Suvi Teräsniska – Vain ihminen (co-writer) Universal Music

== See also ==
- Le Sound Royal on Facebook
- Atlético Kumpula on Facebook
