= Pohjosen poika =

Studio album by Mikael Gabriel
- Released: 26 January 2011
- Label: Universal Music Group
- Producer: OP Beats

Mikael Gabriel chronology
5 miljoonaa muuta (2009)	Pohjosen poika (2011)	Mun maailma (2013)

Pohjosen poika is the second studio album by Finnish rapper Mikael Gabriel. It was released on 26 January 2011. The album peaked at number nine on the Official Finnish Album Chart.

== Track listing ==
No.	Title	Length
1.	"Käännä pää"	3:19
2.	"Pohjosen poika"	3:15
3.	"Sä olit oikees"	3:57
4.	"Graindaamaan" (featuring Tuomas Kauhanen)	4:23
5.	"Historiaa" (featuring Uniikki)	4:34
6.	"Rakastu räppäriin"	3:09
7.	"Nappulaliiga" (featuring Greedy & Mike)	4:17
8.	"Sydämet yhteen"	3:23
9.	"Mitä jos" (featuring Timo Pieni Huijaus)	3:13
10.	"Kuule mua" (featuring Kristiina Wheeler)	4:20
11.	"Päästäkää must irti"	4:35

== Charts ==
Chart (2011)	Peak position
Finnish Albums Chart	9

== Release history ==
Region	Date	Format	Label
Finland	26 January 2011	CD, digital download	Universal Music Group
