= Versus (Mikael Gabriel album) =

Studio album by Mikael Gabriel
- Released: 15 May 2015
- Label: Universal Music Group

Mikael Gabriel chronology
Mun maailma (2013)	Versus (2015)	Ääripäät (2018)

Versus is the fourth studio album by Finnish rapper Mikael Gabriel. It was released on 15 May 2015. Four singles preceded the release; "Woppaa" featuring Kevin Tandu, "Älä herätä mua unesta", "Viimeisen kerran" featuring Diandra and "Mimmit fiilaa". The album peaked at number two on the Official Finnish Album Chart.

== Track listing ==
No.	Title	Length
1.	"Versus (Tägää mun nimi)"	2:18
2.	"Mimmit fiilaa"	3:21
3.	"Hirviö"	3:20
4.	"Kun sä lähdet"	3:26
5.	"(Skit)"	1:50
6.	"Viimeisen kerran" (featuring Diandra)	3:25
7.	"Älä herätä mua unesta"	3:24
8.	"Hyvis"	3:36
9.	"Uusi testamentti (Skit 2)"	1:59
10.	"Kovaa"	5:24
11.	"Young Huztla" (featuring Uniikki)	3:17
12.	"Avaimet lukoille" (featuring Asa)	3:40
13.	"Bitch"	2:57
14.	"Woppaa" (featuring Kevin Tandu)	3:28
15.	"Vastatuuleen"	3:11
16.	"En oo lähös mihinkään"	3:11

== Charts ==
Chart (2015)	Peak position
Finnish Albums (Suomen virallinen lista)	2

== Release history ==
Region	Date	Format	Label
Finland	15 May 2015	CD, digital download	Universal Music Group
