= Haastaja =

Studio album by Jontte Valosaari
- Released: 26 April 2013
- Label: EMI Finland
- Producer: MGI

Singles from Haastaja
- 1. "Jos mä oisin sun mies" Released: 9 November 2012; 2. "Haastaja" Released: 15 February 2013

Haastaja is the debut studio album by Finnish pop singer Jontte Valosaari. Released on 26 April 2013 by EMI Finland, the album peaked at number 29 on the Official Finnish Album Chart.

== Track listing ==
No.	Title	Length
1.	"Tuleen"	3:45
2.	"Jos mä oisin sun mies" (featuring Elastinen)	3:16
3.	"Haastaja"	3:11
4.	"Salaman selkään"	3:30
5.	"Ensimmäistä kertaa"	3:25
6.	"Lennän" (featuring Cheek)	3:47
7.	"Seuraava askel"	3:42
8.	"Valo (Natteravn)"	3:51
9.	"Sun kaa"	3:32
10.	"Hyvä yö"	3:17
11.	"Orjantappuraa"	5:12
12.	"Se parhaiten nauraa" (featuring Herrasmiesliiga)	3:19

== Charts ==
Chart (2013)	Peak position
Finnish Albums Chart	29

== Release history ==
Region	Date	Format	Label
Finland	26 April 2013	CD, digital download	EMI Finland
