= Heikki Kuula =

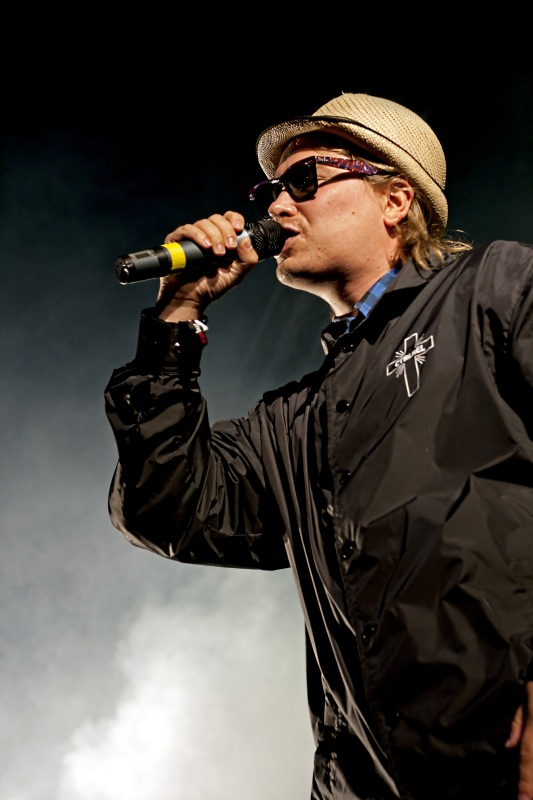
- Heikki Kuula in 2010.

Background information
- Also known as: Huukki-Heikki, Perhosveitsi-Heikki, Héctor Gucci, Nemo, Sexual Hexual, Kuikki Heela
- Born: 27 January 1983 (age 43)
- Origin: Helsinki, Finland
- Genre: Rap
- Occupations: Rapper, record producer, graphic designer
- Instrument: Vocals
- Label: Yellowmic Records

Heikki Johannes Kuula (born 27 January 1983) is a Finnish rapper, record producer and graphic designer. He is known for his frequent collaborations with the fellow rapper Pyhimys who has also served as an executive producer on Kuula's albums.

== Career beginnings ==
Heikki Kuula released his first album Hoodipihvii with Voli in 2004, and two years later they teamed up again for Wordcup. That year Kuula also released his first solo album Vihreä salmiakki. His second solo album PLLP arrived in 2008.

== Commercial success ==
Kuula's third solo album Blacksuami was released in May 2010 and was the first to appear on the Official Finnish Album Chart where it reached the position 41. Heikki Kuula started to gain more recognition later that year after he appeared as a featured artist on the song "Epoo", a debut single by the rap duo Jare & VilleGalle. Kuula also appeared on their next single "Nelisilmä" which reached number 17 on the Official Finnish Singles Chart.

In February 2012, Heikki Kuula and Pyhimys released an album Katuvisioita, using the pseudonyms Perhosveitsi-Heikki and Lika-Aki. The album peaked at number nine on the Official Finnish Album Chart.

== Teflon Brothers ==
Heikki Kuula is also a part of the hip hop and rap group Teflon Brothers with Pyhimys and Voli. They have released three albums so far; T (2009), © (2010) and Valkoisten dyynien ratsastajat (2013). The latter has become their most successful release to date, peaking at number six on the Official Finnish Album Chart. The album has also spawned a single "Seksikkäin jäbä", featuring Stig and Meiju Suvas, which reached number three on the Official Finnish Singles Chart.

== Discography ==
=== Solo albums ===
Year	Title	Peak position
Year	Title	FIN
2006	Vihreä salmiakki	—
2008	PLLP	—
2008	Punainen planeetta (mixtape)	—
2010	Blacksuami	41
2014	Heijastuksia täydelliseltä rundilta	22
2015	PLLP (LP rerelease)	8
2020	404	41

=== Solo singles ===
Year	Title	Peak position
Year	Title	FIN
2013	"Koirakaveri"	11
2016	"Bae"	9
2016	"Suomalainen mies"	13

=== Heikki Kuula and Voli ===
Year	Title	Peak position
Year	Title	FIN
2004	Hoodipihvii	—
2006	Wordcup	—

=== Perhosveitsi-Heikki and Lika-Aki ===
Year	Title	Peak position
Year	Title	FIN
2012	Katuvisioita	9

=== Teflon Brothers ===
Year	Title	Peak position
Year	Title	FIN
2009	T	26
2010	©	26
2013	Valkoisten dyynien ratsastajat	6
2014	Isänpäivä	49

=== As a featured artist ===
Artist	Song	Album	Other featured artists	Year
Cheddar	"Nomen es Omen"	Argumentum Pro Rationem	Setittäjä, Pyhimys & Voli	2004
Pyhimys	"Kukkanen"	Rajatapaus		2004
Pyhimys	"Chiki Lee"	Pyhimysteeri? The Pink Album		2005
Heinähattu	"Kaikki oli viatont"	Tilapäinen taideteos		2005
Pyhimys	"Kun mä tapoin poliisin"	Clipshow 2003–2004	Musti & Voli	2006
Steen1	"Ajat on kovat"	Nottinghamin paskasheriffi	Diami, Asa, Jontti, Shaka, Ville Kalliosta, Pyhimys, Pikkupiru & Akli Käärme	2006
Pyhimys	"6:05"	Salainen Maailma		2007
Polarsoul	"Kallio viboi"	World Bump		2008
Pyhimys & Timo Pieni Huijaus	"Arvoitus"	Arvoitus koko ihminen	Juno	2008
Heinis	"Haaskaa"	Säätöpossu		2008
Heinis	"Asfaltti-ihottumaa"	Säätöpossu		2008
Juno	"Pliisut viisut"	13		2008
Juno	"Pohjanmaan kautta"	V-Tyyli		2010
Pyhimys	"Siipirikko"	Vieras	Ruudolf	2010
Kreivi	"Myrkky on herkkuu"	Von Salamanteri	Käsipuoli	2010
Käsipuoli	"Rehellistä ryöstöö"	Mikä on pläkki?		2010
Heinis & Ezk	"Kolehti"	Vuos10nen		2010
Kolmiodraama	"Älä luota prostituoituun"	Jotain tasottavaa		2011
Jare & VilleGalle	"Epoo"	Mustaa kultaa		2011
Jare & VilleGalle	"Nelisilmä"	Mustaa kultaa		2011
Saurus	"Keskipiste"	Elossa	MattiP, Samae Koskinen & Jimi Tenor	2011
JVG	"Sun stiflat"	jvg.fi	Sini Sabotage	2012
JVG	"Miesjuustot"	jvg.fi		2012
Uniikki	"Kotka"	Kiitorata	MG	2012
Karri Koira	"Ei tarkoittaa ei"	K.O.I.R.A.	Ruudolf	2012
