= Outta My Head =

Outta My Head may refer to:

- Outta My Head (album), a 2012 album by Diandra, or the title song
- "Outta My Head" (Craig Campbell song), 2012
- "Outta My Head" (Daughtry song), 2012
- "Outta My Head" (Leona Lewis song), 2009
- "Outta My Head" (Spiderbait song), 2001
- "Outta My Head (Ay Ya Ya)", a 2007 song by Ashlee Simpson
- "Outta My Head", a 2010 song by Darren Styles from Feel the Pressure
- "Outta My Head", a 2019 song by Khalid and John Mayer from Free Spirit

== See also ==
- Out of My Head (disambiguation)
