= Ääripäät =

Studio album by Mikael Gabriel
- Released: 1 June 2018
- Label: Universal Music Group

Mikael Gabriel chronology
Versus (2015)	Ääripäät (2018)

Ääripäät is the fifth studio album by Finnish rapper Mikael Gabriel. It was released on 1 June 2018. According to Gabriel, the album is happier and less "deep" than his previous ones.

== Track listing ==
No.	Title	Length
1.	"Muovipalmuja"	3:14
2.	"Naapurit kuulee"	3:27
3.	"Ääripäät"	3:10
4.	"Kivi sakset seteli" (featuring Elastinen and Pyhimys)	3:28
5.	"Pidä musta kii"	3:20
6.	"Mennään Bulil"	3:14
7.	"Sahara"	3:38
8.	"Älä huku kyyneliin"	3:30
9.	"Timanttei"	3:14
10.	"Pimeyteen"	3:19
11.	"Ei oo hätää"	3:27

== Charts ==
Chart (2018)	Peak position
Finnish Albums (Suomen virallinen lista)	1

== Release history ==
Region	Date	Format	Label
Finland	1 June 2018	CD, digital download	Universal Music Group
