= Timo Pieni Huijaus =

Finnish rapper and fashion designer

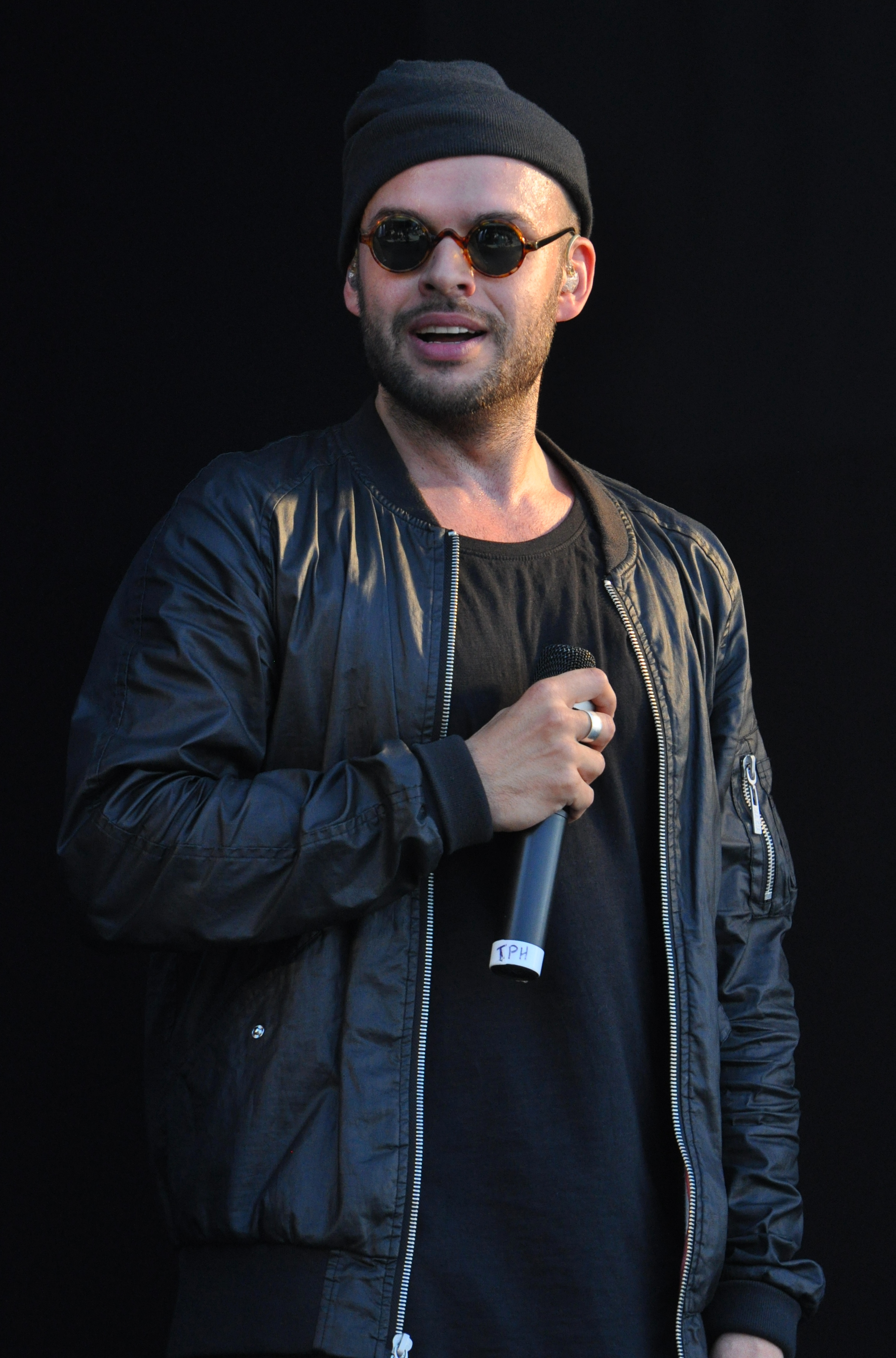
- Timo Pieni Huijaus in 2013.

Background information
- Also known as: TPH, Ii
- Born: Timo Juhani Snellman; June 2, 1982 (age 44)
- Origin: Porvoo, Finland
- Genres: Rap, East coast hip hop, conscious hip hop
- Occupation: Rapper
- Instruments: Vocals, guitar
- Label: Rähinä Records

Timo Juhani Snellman (born June 2, 1982), professionally known as Timo Pieni Huijaus (Timo The Little Hoax), is a Finnish rapper and fashion designer.

== Career beginnings ==
Timo Pieni Huijaus comes from a family with musical background. He has been inspired by hip hop music since the early 1990s, and in 1996, after getting his first computer, he started to create his own music. At first he was touring with bands like Fintelligens and Kapasiteettiyksikkö, using a pseudonym Ii. In addition to his musical career, he has also worked as a fashion designer and graphic designer.

Rähinä Records released a mixtape E.T.T.E. by Timo Pieni Huijaus and Elastinen in 2006. Timo Pieni Huijaus has also appeared on compilation albums and as a featured guest on albums by such rap acts as Uniikki and Trilogia.

== Commercial success ==
In August 2008, Timo Pieni Huijaus and Pyhimys released an album Arvoitus koko ihminen, which peaked at number 16 on the Official Finnish Album Chart. His first solo album Emävale followed in November 2010. The album peaked at number 11 on the Official Finnish Album Chart and featured guest appearances by fellow rappers such as Elastinen, Illi and Joniveli.

Timo Pieni Huijaus released his second solo album Kaikki loppuu in March 2012. Again Elastinen and Illi appeared as featured guests, along with Andu, Tasis and JVG. The album peaked at number nine on the Official Album Chart and also featured his first song to appear on the Official Finnish Singles Chart, "Pleiboi", which peaked at number 15.

== Selected discography ==
=== Albums ===
Year	Album	Peak positions
Year	Album	FIN
2008	Arvoitus koko ihminen (joint with Pyhimys)	16
2011	Emävale	11
2012	Kaikki loppuu	9

=== Mixtapes ===
Year	Title	Peak position
Year	Title	FIN
2006	E.T.T.E. (joint with Elastinen)	–

=== Singles ===
Year	Title	Peak position	Album
Year	Title	FIN	Album
2011	"Pleiboi"	15	Kaikki loppuu
2012	"Paratiisi"	–	Kaikki loppuu

=== As a featured artist ===
Featured in

Year	Title	Peak position	Album
Year	Title	FIN	Album
2013	"Loppuviikko" (Elastinen featuring Uniikki, Timo Pieni Huijaus, Tasis & Spekti)	12	Joka päivä koko päivä

- "Yritän" by Trilogia (2004)
- "This Town (Remix)" by Brandon (2004)
- "Pohjalt" by Uniikki (2005)
- "Yksinäisyyden ja yhtenäisyyden vuori" by Asa (2006)
- "Nippusiteitä ja mustaa teippii" by Elastinen (2007)
- "Turhia murheita" by Fintelligens (2008)
- "Riktiga ting" by Redrama (2009)
- "Jatkan matkaa" by Brädi (2010)
- "Mitä jos" by Mikael Gabriel (2011)
- "Kasarin lapsi" by Jare & VilleGalle (2011)
- "Yöeläin" by Flegmaatikot (2012)
