= Mercedes-Benz (disambiguation) =

Mercedes-Benz is a German automotive brand owned by Mercedes-Benz Group. It may also refer to:

== Songs ==
- "Mercedes Benz" (song), a 1971 song by Janis Joplin and Bob Neuwirth
- "Mercedes-Benz" (Sway song), a 2009 song by Sway

== Stadiums ==
- Mercedes-Benz Arena, the former name of the MHPArena in Stuttgart, Baden-Württemberg, Germany
- Mercedes-Benz Arena (Berlin), Germany
- Mercedes-Benz Arena (Shanghai), China
- Mercedes-Benz Stadium, a multi-purpose stadium in Atlanta, Georgia, United States
- Mercedes-Benz Superdome, the former name of Caesars Superdome in New Orleans, Louisiana, United States

== See also ==
- Mercedes Bentso, Finnish rap musician
