= Mercedes Bentso =

Finnish rapper

Linda-Maria Raninen (née Roine), known as Mercedes or Mercedes Bentso (born 1993 in Helsinki, Finland) is a Finnish rapper. Her lyrics deal with substance dependence, violence and discrimination.

== Career ==
Raninen became interested in rap music at the age of 15 after listening to Steen1's lyrics, seeing Steen1 as her greatest inspirer. In 2011 the rap artist Pyhimys listened to Raninen at the youth activity centre Happi in Helsinki and asked her to cooperate with him. Raninen dropped out of gymnasium because of Steen1's contact, decided to rid herself of her former circle of friends and started concentrating on creating music. One of her appearances was on a music video by the rap collective GG Caravan.

In December 2012 Raninen's first single and video Personal Raineri was published on YouTube, gaining over 20 thousand views in a couple of weeks. In spring 2013 she appeared on the second season of Fort Boyard Suomi on Nelonen in the rapper team, along with Pyhimys, Voli and Jari-Pekka Hietsila. Raninen's first album Ei koskaan enää was produced by Steen1 and it was published in April 2017.

As well as music, Raninen is interested in acting, and in 2012 she played in the play Jumala on suuri by Veijo Baltzar in the Temppeliaukio Church. After Baltzar was arrested for severe human trafficking and sexual abuse, Raininen made a statement in December 2019 that after the theatre project she had been sexually abused by Baltzar. Raninen had written a song called Clare Quilty about the matter in March 2019. The video of the song, published in November 2019, tells a pretty straight story about the cult Baltzar had created.

The document film Ei koskaan enää about Raninen's life was premiered at the Helsinki International Film Festival in September 2018.

== Private life ==
Raninen is a Romani on her father's side, and she also comes from a Kosovo Albanian and Karelian evacuee background. She comes from East Helsinki where she grew up as a child of a single mother. She has spoken openly about the bullying and domestic abuse she had suffered and about her own drug use. In magazine interviews, she has said she had mostly used Subutex, as well as amphetamine, ecstasy and benzodiazepine, the latter being the inspiration for her artist name Mercedes Bentso.

As a child, Raninen did not have many friends. She dropped out of gymnasium on her first year, when she met her Subutex-addicted boyfriend, who later assaulted her.

Raninen's spouse is the former lifetime prisoner Janne Raninen.

== Societal influence ==
Raninen was a member of the Left Youth, supported Li Andersson in the 2014 European Parliament election and appeared on her electoral campaigns. She later announced she had resigned from the Left Youth and the Left Alliance on her Facebook page in September 2015. According to the announcement, there was no drama involved in the resignation, instead it was a result of a long premeditation process. According to Raninen, one of the reasons for her resignation was a differing opinion about feminism. Raninen has made an appearance in the "Ihan tavallisia asioita" project initiated by President of Finland Sauli Niinistö, which is intended to attract attention to social exclusion of youths, and she has also appeared on the A-talk discussion program on Yleisradio. The Helsinki Societal Academy presented the Societal Knowledge award to Raninen in 2013.

== Discography ==
=== Albums ===
- Ei koskaan enää (2017)
- Joka ikinen yö (2019)

=== Singles ===
- ”Verikosto” (2015)
- ”Murhaaja” (2016)
- ”Tuutulaulu” (2017)

=== Videos ===
- "Personal Raineri" (2012)
- "Munaton mies" (2015)
- "Muutoksen tuulet" (2015)
- ”Verikosto” (2015)
- ”Tytöt ei osaa räppää, piste!” (2015)
- "Murhaaja" (2016)
- "Tuutulaulu" (2017)
- "Viimeinen koulupäivä" (2018)
- "Clare Quilty" (2019)

=== As a featured artist ===
Artist	Song	Album	Other featured artists	Year
Elinkautinen	"Muutoksen tuulet"	Taistelutahto		2015
Rauhatäti	"Tytöt ei osaa räppää, piste!"	Tytöt ei osaa räppää, piste!	MC Pyhä Lehmä	2015

== Bibliography ==
- Venla Pystynen, Linda-Maria Roine, Mercedes Bentso – ei koira muttei mieskään, Johnny Kniga, 2019 ISBN 978-951-0-43580-9
- Linda-Maria Roine, Mercedes Bentso – Totuus ja tunnustus, Johnny Kniga, 2020 ISBN 978-951-0-45395-7
- Alviina Alametsä, Linda-Maria Roine, Koulumustelmat: kiusaaminen on väkivaltaa. Helsinki: Johnny Kniga 2022 ISBN 978-951-0-47841-7
