= Tasis (rapper) =

- Also known as: Tasapaino, Shanghai Tasis
- Born: Markku Lauri Johannes Wettenranta
- Origin: Porvoo, Finland
- Genre: Rap
- Occupation: Rapper
- Years active: 2000–present
- Label: Rähinä Records

Markku Lauri Johannes Wettenranta, better known by his stage name Tasis, is a Finnish rapper. Besides being one of the founders of the record company Rähinä Records, Tasis was also part of the group Kapasiteettiyksikkö together with Uniikki and Andu.

== Selected discography ==
=== As featured artist ===
| Year | Title | Peak position | Album |
| Year | Title | FIN | Album |
|---|---|---|---|
| 2007 | "Tuhlaajapoika" (Cheek featuring Tasis) | – | Kasvukipuja |
| 2013 | "Loppuviikko" (Elastinen featuring Uniikki, Timo Pieni Huijaus, Tasis & Spekti) | 12 | Joka päivä koko päivä |
| 2013 | "Juomalaulu" (Spekti featuring Tasis) | 7 | Diktaattorimies |
| 2014 | "Macho fantastico" (Spekti featuring Tasis) | 1 | Macho fantastico |
