= Jontte Valosaari =

Finnish pop singer (born 1980)

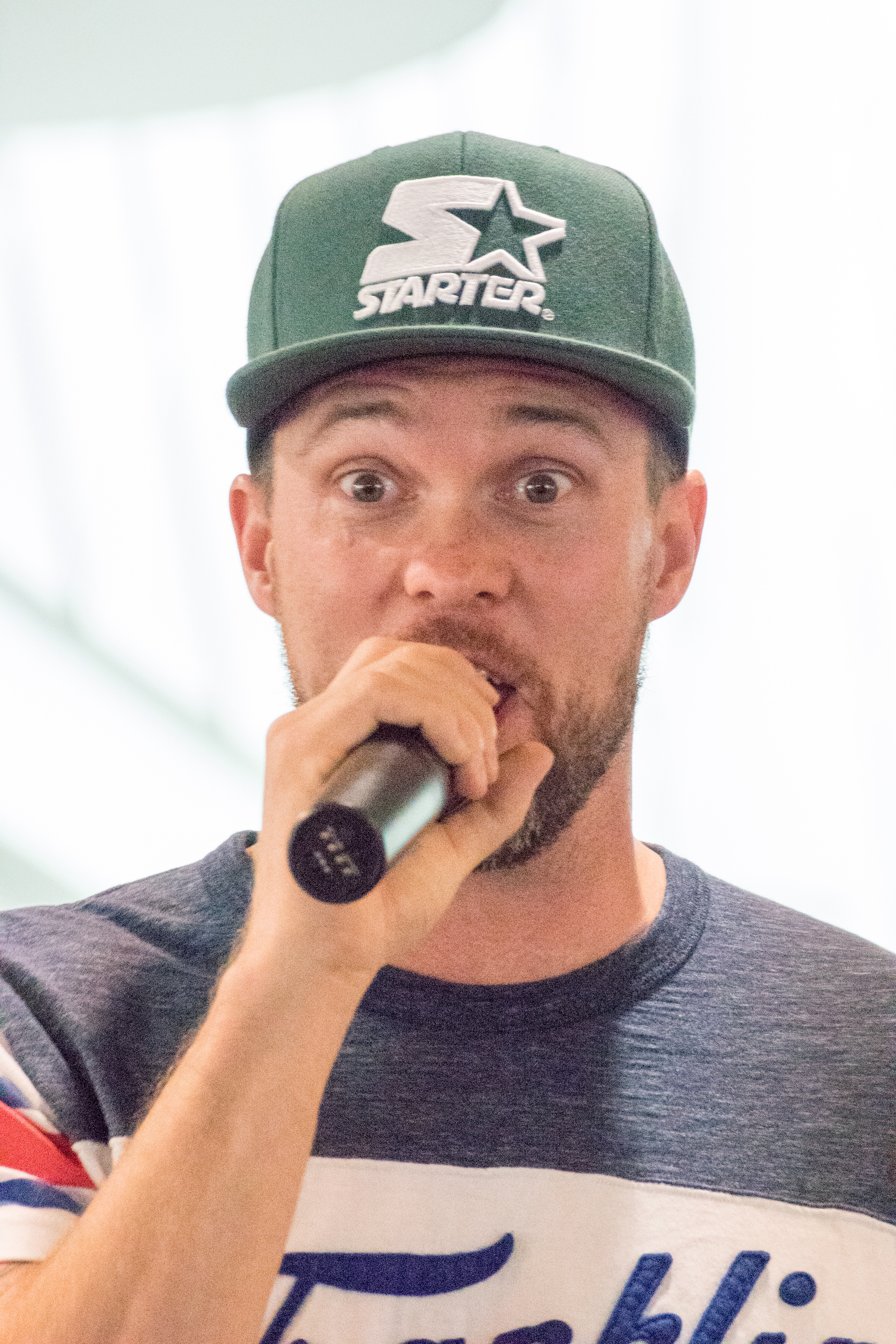
- Valosaari in September 2014

Background information
- Also known as: Jontte
- Born: Jontte Valosaari; 5 April 1980 (age 46)
- Origin: Helsinki, Finland
- Genres: Urban pop, R&B, dance music
- Occupations: Singer, firefighter
- Instrument: Vocals
- Years active: 2010–present
- Label: EMI Finland
- Website: Official homepage

Jontte Valosaari (born 5 April 1980) is a Finnish pop singer. He is best known for his first solo single "Jos mä oisin sun mies".

== Career beginnings ==
Valosaari was first recognized by rapper Elastinen when he was doing construction work for him. Elastinen invited him over for studio sessions, resulting in Valosaari's first solo single "Jos mä oisin sun mies", on which Elastinen also appeared as a featured guest. The song was released on 9 November 2012, and it peaked at number two on the Official Finnish Singles Chart. Valosaari has also been heard as a featured guest on songs by fellow rappers Brädi and Cheek.

== 2013–present: Haastaja ==
Valosaari signed a recording deal with EMI Finland in 2012 and started working with producer Henri "MGI" Lanz. After their recording sessions in Los Angeles, Valosaari and MGI came up with 11 tracks for Valosaari's first album Haastaja, released on 26 April 2013. The second single from the album, the title track, was released on 15 February 2013. In May 2013, the album peaked at number 29 on the Finnish Album Chart.

== Personal life ==
Jontte Valosaari married a bikini fitness athlete Mari Kasvi in 2013. They have one daughter. Aside from his musical career, Valosaari is also working as a firefighter.

== Selected discography ==
=== Albums ===
Year	Title	Peak position
Year	Title	FIN
2013	Haastaja	29

=== Singles ===
Year	Title	Peak position		Album
Year	Title	FIN Singles	FIN Digital	Album
2012	"Jos mä oisin sun mies" (featuring Elastinen)	2	20	Haastaja
2013	"Haastaja"	–	18	Haastaja
2014	"Kiinni jäit" (featuring Mikael Gabriel)	6	21	–
2014	"Selvää jälkee" (featuring Brädi)	–	18	–

As a featured artist

Year	Title	Peak position		Album
Year	Title	FIN Singles	FIN Digital	Album
2014	"Rannalle" (TCT featuring Jontte Valosaari)	5	7	–
