= Kapasiteettiyksikkö =

Finnish hip hop group

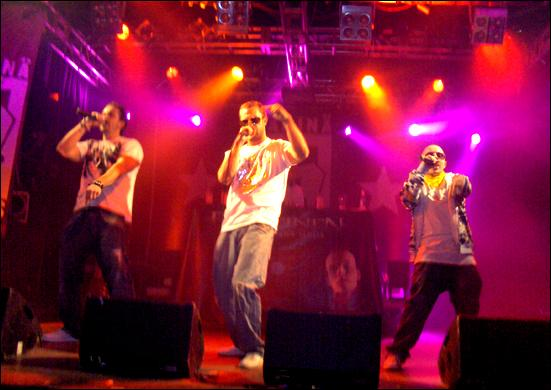
- Kapasiteettiyksikkö performing in 2006.

Background information
- Origin: Helsinki, Finland
- Genres: Hip hop
- Years active: 1997–2008
- Labels: Warner Music Finland (2000–2003); Rähinä Records (2003–2008)
- Members: Anders "Andu" Westerholm; Markku "Tasis" Wettenranta; Dan "Uniikki" Tolppanen

Kapasiteettiyksikkö (Finnish for "capacity unit") was a Finnish hip hop group from Helsinki. The group was formed in 1997 by Anders "Andu" Westerholm, Markku "Tasis" Wettenranta and Dan "Uniikki" Tolppanen. Along with Fintelligens, Kapasiteettiyksikkö was one of the first Finnish-language hip hop groups that gained popularity in the country.

In 2003, together with Fintelligens members Elastinen and Iso H, Kapasiteettiyksikkö founded the record label Rähinä Records.

== Discography ==
=== Albums ===
- Päivästtoiseen (2001)
- Klassikko (2002)
- Itsenäisyyspäivä (2003)
- Usko parempaan (2004)
- Susijengi (2006)
- I ♥ KY (2008)

=== Singles ===
Year	Single	Peak chart positions	Album
Year	Single	FIN	Album
2000	"Etenee"	8	Päivästtoiseen
2000	"4elementtii" (feat. Avain)	2	Päivästtoiseen
2001	"Heineidit"	—	Päivästtoiseen
2001	"A-ay!" (feat. Diaz)	—	Päivästtoiseen
2002	"Toisinaan"	9	Klassikko
2002	"Näyttää hyvältä" (feat. Eye-N-I & Profilen)	7	Klassikko
2003	"Tää on mun Stadi" (feat. Hector)	—	Klassikko
2003	"Pakko saada sut"	3	Itsenäisyyspäivä
2004	"Ota ne pois 2"	5	
2004	"Usko parempaan"	6	Usko parempaan
2004	"Lähdössä"	—	Usko parempaan
2006	"Erobiisi"	4	Susijengi
2006	"Vielä vähän aikaa"	—	Susijengi
2008	"Pidä kiinni"	—	I ♥ KY

=== Music videos ===
- "A-ay!" (2001)
- "Tää on mun Stadi" (2002)
- "Pakko saada sut" (2003)
- "Usko parempaan" (2004)
- "Niit on jokapuolel" (2004)
- "Erobiisi" (2006)
- "Vielä vähän aikaa" (2006)
