= Älä herätä mua unesta =

Single by Mikael Gabriel

from the album Versus
- Released: 1 January 2014
- Genre: Hip hop
- Label: Universal Music Oy

Mikael Gabriel singles chronology
| "Woppaa" (2014) | "Älä herätä mua unesta" (2014) | "Viimeisen kerran" (2015) |

"Älä herätä mua unesta" is the third single by Finnish rapper Mikael Gabriel, which was released on 1 January 2014 by Universal Music Oy. The song has peaked at number 2 on the Finnish singles chart.

== Track listing ==
Digital download
| No. | Title | Length |
|---|---|---|
| 1. | "Älä herätä mua unesta" | 3:25 |

== Music video ==
Music video was uploaded on 19 November 2016 by Mikael Gabriel.

== Charts ==
| Chart (2014–2015) | Peak position |
|---|---|
| Finland (Suomen virallinen lista) | 2 |

== Release history ==
| Region | Year | Format | Label |
|---|---|---|---|
| Finland | 1 January 2014 | Digital download | Universal Music Oy |
