= Out of My Head =

Out of My Head may refer to:

== Music ==
=== Albums ===
- Out of My Head (album) or the title song, by D4, 2005
- Out of My Head, by the Fools, 1983
- Out of My Head, an EP by Degenerates, 1991

=== Songs ===
- "Out of My Head" (Charli XCX song), 2017
- "Out of My Head" (Fastball song), 1999
- "Out of My Head" (John Newman song), 2014
- "Out of My Head" (Lupe Fiasco song), 2011
- "Out of My Head" (Mobile song), 2006
- "Out of My Head", by the Black Eyed Peas from The E.N.D., 2009
- "Out of My Head", by Chvrches from Love Is Dead, 2018
- "Out of My Head", by the Cockroaches from Fingertips, 1988
- "Out of My Head", by First Aid Kit from Palomino, 2022
- "Out of My Head", by Gramophonedzie, 2010
- "Out of My Head", by the Griswolds, 2016
- "Out of My Head", by Junkhouse from Strays, 1993
- "Out of My Head", by Kieran Goss, 1998
- "Out of My Head", by Loote, 2017
- "Out of My Head", by Prism from Jericho, 1993
- "Out of My Head", by Puddle of Mudd from Come Clean, 2001
- "Out of My Head", by Theory of a Deadman from The Truth Is..., 2011
- "Out of My Head", by Tom Cochrane from No Stranger, 2006
- "Out of My Head", by Winslow, 2018
- "Out of My Head", by the Wombats from Beautiful People Will Ruin Your Life, 2018
- "You Took the Happiness (Out of My Head)", by The Nitty Gritty Dirt Band from The Nitty Gritty Dirt Band, 1967

== Books ==
- Out of My Head (Hors de moi), a 2003 novel by Didier Van Cauwelaert
- Out of My Head, a 1986 essay collection by Robert Bloch

== See also ==
- Outta My Head (disambiguation)
