= Kiinni jäit =

Single by Jontte Valosaari featuring Mikael Gabriel
- Released: 21 January 2014
- Length: 3:42
- Label: EMI Finland
- Songwriter(s): Sakari Petteri Aalto, Henri Jouni Kristian Lanz, Aleksi Juhani Sariola, Mikael Sohlman

Jontte Valosaari singles chronology
"Haastaja" (2013)	"Kiinni jäit" (2014)	"Rannalle" (2014)

Mikael Gabriel singles chronology
"Yksipuolista rakkautta" (2013)	"Kiinni jäit" (2014)

"Kiinni jäit" is a song by Finnish pop singer Jontte Valosaari featuring rapper Mikael Gabriel. Released on 21 January 2014, the song peaked at number six on the Finnish Singles Chart.

== Chart performance ==
Chart (2014)	Peak position
Finland (Suomen virallinen lista)	6
