= Elastinen feat. =

Elastinen feat. is a Finnish music program that debuted in March 2016 on MTV3, in which Finnish rapper Elastinen produces a track with the episode's guest artist. An album featuring the songs created during the show was released on 6 May 2016.

Artists such as Robin, Juha Tapio, Hector, Anna Puu and Sami Hedberg appear on the show. Jukka Immonen works as the producer for the songs on the show.

== Episodes ==
No.	Episode name	Original air date	Viewers
1	Elastinen feat. Lauri Tähkä	11 March 2016	278,000
2	Elastinen feat. Hector	18 March 2016	223,000
3	Elastinen feat. Robin	25 March 2016	169,000
4	Elastinen feat. Johanna Kurkela	1 April 2016	217,000
5	Elastinen feat. Sami Hedberg	8 April 2016	241,000
6	Elastinen feat. Anssi Kela	15 April 2016	–
7	Elastinen feat. Anna Puu	22 April 2016	–
8	Elastinen feat. Samu Haber	29 April 2016	242,000
9	Elastinen feat. Vesala	13 May 2016	
10	Elastinen feat. Juha Tapio	20 May 2016	

=== Tracks by episode ===
1. Elastinen feat. Lauri Tähkä - Lempo (3:03)
2. Elastinen feat. Hector - Stadi on niin snadi (2:59)
3. Elastinen feat. Robin - AAAA (3:17)
4. Elastinen feat. Johanna Kurkela – Oota mua (3:30)
5. Elastinen feat. Sami Hedberg – Täytyy jaksaa (3:03)
6. Elastinen feat. Anssi Kela – Voitais välillä elää (3:03)
7. Elastinen feat. Anna Puu – Kesä '99 (3:09)
8. Elastinen feat. Samu Haber – Tarpeeks täydellinen (3:00)
9. Elastinen feat. Vesala – En tunne sua (2:47)
10. Elastinen feat. Juha Tapio – Parasta aikaa

== Charts ==
The album debuted at number one in Finland.

Chart (2016)	Peak position
Finnish Albums (Suomen virallinen lista)	1
