= Kendo Anthem =

Single by Teflon Brothers

from the album Isänpäivä
- Released: 14 April 2014
- Recorded: 2014
- Genre: Pop / electronic music
- Length: 3:38
- Label: Johanna Kustannus

Teflon Brothers singles chronology
"Seksikkäin jäbä" (2013)	"Kendo Anthem" (2014)	"Maradona (kesä '86)" (2014)

"Kendo Anthem" is a 2014 single by Finnish band Teflon Brothers. Released on 14 April 2014, the song peaked at number three on the Finnish Singles Chart. In Finland, "kendo" is a tongue-in-cheek term for ice hockey.

== Chart performance ==
Chart (2014)	Peak position
Finland (Suomen virallinen lista)	3
