= Steen Christensen =

Danish criminal

Steen Viktor Christensen (born 1964) is a Danish criminal, who was sentenced in Denmark in 1992 to twelve years in prison for numerous bank robberies, hostage taking, and rape. In autumn 1997, Christensen was allowed to go on an unguarded prison furlough, during which he escaped to Finland.

On 22 October 1997, Christensen robbed the Palace Hotel in Helsinki, and during his escape from the hotel, he shot and killed two police officers, sergeant Eero Holsti and senior constable Antero Palo, on Tehtaankatu. The incident caused an unprecedented manhunt in Finland. Christensen was caught in Hämeenlinna, when he was leaving the Hotel Vaakuna. He had been living in the hotel under the name Kim Anderssen.

On trial at the Helsinki district court, Christensen was assisted by the lawyer Aarno Arvela. Christensen immediately admitted guilt for the two murders and announced that he did not want to appeal his sentence.

Despite his protests, Christensen was sent to a mental health examination in the Niuvanniemi mental hospital. He spent 21 days in the hospital, after which the examination was cancelled. The reason for this was Christensen's refusal to undergo any kind of psychological tests or examinations. Despite the cancellation of the examination, the Finnish judicial centre of health care (TEO) made a statement about Christensen's mental health. According to the statement, Christensen acted out of full reason and was a dangerous repeat offender.

Christensen was sentenced to life imprisonment, and is serving it at the Herstedvester prison in Denmark. He was also sentenced to pay the families of the police officers he killed, the state treasury, and the watchman at the Hotel Palace a total of almost 275,000 Finnish mark (about 46,300 euro) and to pay a life support of 3873 Finnish mark (about 651.40 euro) per month to one underaged child. The sum consists mainly of family pensions and compensation for mental suffering. As well as the costs for the biggest criminal chase ever in Finland, the state had to pay the trial costs of over 62,500 Finnish mark (about 10 500 euro). Reporter Matts Dumell interviewed Christensen in the Hämeenlinna prison four days before he was transferred to Denmark. The interview was shown in the Rikosraportti program on Nelonen.

The incident led to a great deal of discussion in Denmark about what kind of prisoners, and under what conditions, should be allowed to go on vacation from prison.

In prison, Christensen married a Finnish woman in 2000 who gave birth to their child.

The Finnish rap musician Seppo Lampela originally chose Steen Christensen as his artist name, but changed it to Steen1 after getting his first record deal, because of too much controversy.
