= TCT (band) =

Finnish band

- Origin: Finland
- Genres: Pop, funk, hip hop
- Years active: 2013–present
- Labels: Universal Music Finland
- Members: T.L. Comeetta; Tiahu
- Website: www.tctmusiikki.com

TCT is a Finnish band consisting of T.L., Comeetta and Tiahu. Their music has been described as "party-hop"; it's pop music mixed with elements of funk and hip hop. TCT was signed to Universal Music Finland in June 2013. Their first single "Rannalle" peaked at number five on the Finnish Singles Chart. The band released their debut album IOJK (IhanOmaJuttuKäynnis) on 21 August 2015.

== Discography ==
=== Albums ===
| Year | Title | Peak position |
| Year | Title | FIN |
|---|---|---|
| 2015 | IOJK (IhanOmaJuttuKäynnis) | 39 |

=== Singles ===
| Year | Title | Peak position | Album |
| Year | Title | FIN | Album |
|---|---|---|---|
| 2014 | "Rannalle" (featuring Jontte Valosaari) | 5 | IOJK (IhanOmaJuttuKäynnis) |
| 2014 | "Rammaa" | – | IOJK (IhanOmaJuttuKäynnis) |
| 2014 | "Lavatanssit" | – | IOJK (IhanOmaJuttuKäynnis) |
| 2015 | "Virheistä kaunein" | – | IOJK (IhanOmaJuttuKäynnis) |
| 2015 | "Kesäkissat" | – | IOJK (IhanOmaJuttuKäynnis) |
