= Ezkimo =

Finnish hip hop musician

- Also known as: Ezkimo (1998–2011); Agentti SUMO (2012–2015)
- Born: Mikko Sammeli Mutenia; 3 February 1980; Vantaa, Finland
- Died: 21 June 2015 (aged 35) Helsinki
- Genres: Hip hop, Hardcore hip hop
- Years active: 2000–2015

Mikko Sammeli Mutenia (3 February 1980 – 21 June 2015), better known by his stage name Ezkimo, was a Finnish hip hop musician.

== Death ==
He died on 21 June 2015.

== Discography ==
=== Albums ===
- Iso E (2002)
- Vaa ämsee (2004)
- Muteniaatikot (2009)

=== Singles ===
Year	Single	Peak chart positions	Album
Year	Single	FIN	Album
2000	"Salainen agentti 998"	—	Iso E
2001	"Näin on"	7	Iso E
2002	"Entinen"	—	Iso E
2003	"Bla bla bla"	—	Vaa ämsee
2004	"Tytöt moi"	—	
2009	"Tottakai"	—	Muteniaatikot

=== Music videos ===
- "Salainen agentti 998" (2000)
- "Näin on" (2001)
- "Entinen" (2002)
- "Bla bla bla" (2003)
- "Tytöt moi" (2005)
