= PistePiste =

Harri Arhio, professionally known as PistePiste, is a Finnish pop artist. His debut album Hetken maailma on tässä was released in August 2013.

== Selected discography ==
=== Albums ===
Year	Title	Peak position
Year	Title	FIN
2013	Hetken maailma on tässä	20

=== Singles ===
Year	Title	Peak position
Year	Title	FIN
2014	"Uimaan" (Brädi featuring PistePiste)	17
