= Meiju Suvas =

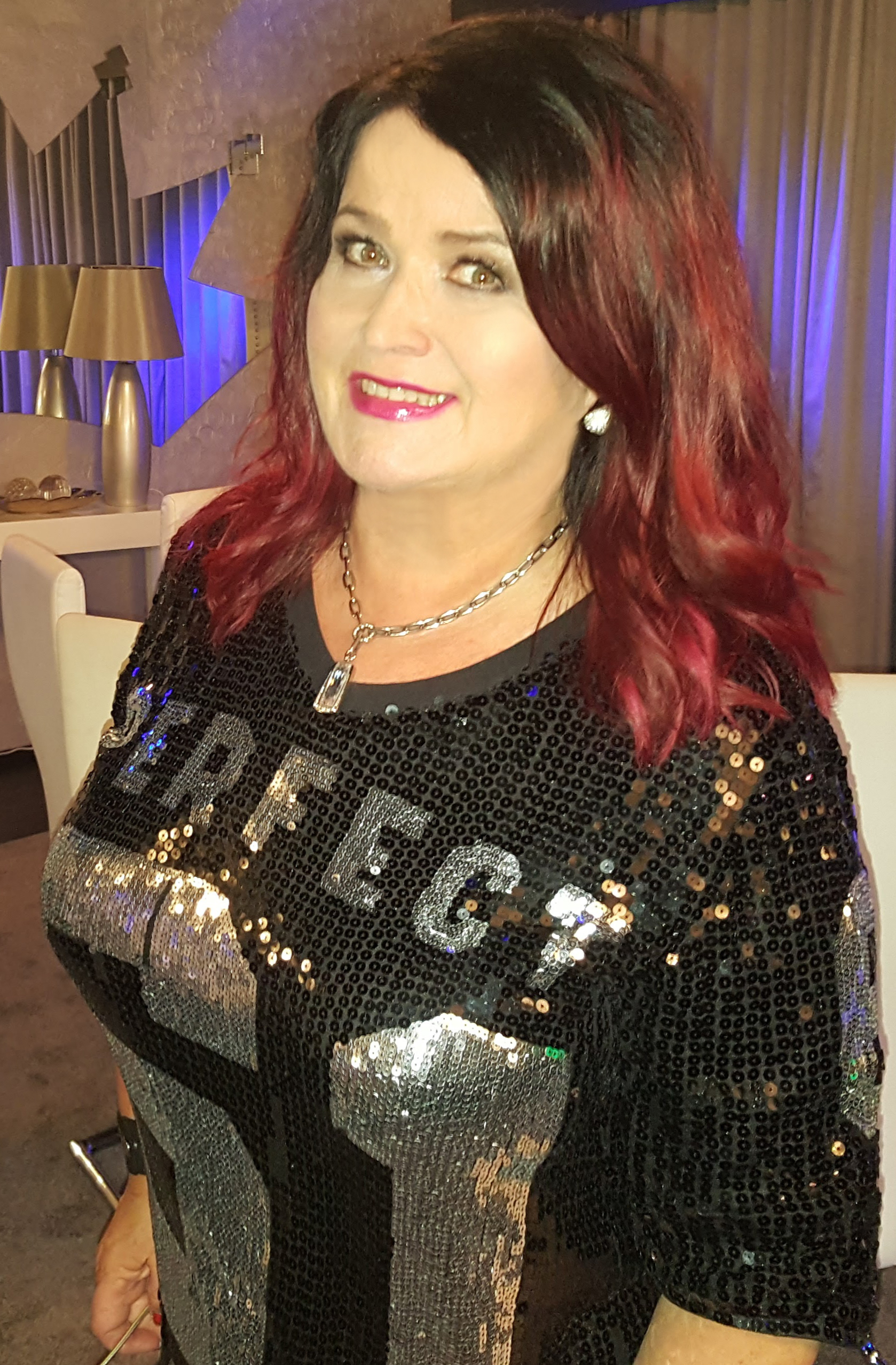
- Meiju Suvas in 2017

Background information
- Born: Merja Annele Suvas; 22 January 1959 (age 67); Helsinki, Finland
- Occupation: Singer
- Years active: 1981–present
- Label: Universal Music Finland

Meiju Annele Suvas-Berger (born 22 January 1959), professionally known as Meiju Suvas, is a Finnish singer.

== Career beginnings ==
Music has been a part of Meiju Suvas' life from a very young age. She started to take piano lessons at the age of four, and later learned to play drums. Suvas formed her first band when she was 13 and made her first demo in 1981. That year she also met with singer Frederik who made her his background singer for the song "Titanic" which was competing for becoming Finland's Eurovision Song Contest entry. While her first double-sided single "Rakastuneet lapset / Jos pyydät yöksi" did not really take off, her second release "Tahdon sinut / Oot paha" made her a household name in 1982.

== Successful years ==
In 1982, Meiju Suvas released her first album Meiju which sold over 54,000 copies. More albums followed on a steady flow until 2001. Eleven years later, in 2012, she returned with her 13th studio album Missä milloin vaan. In addition, she has released eight compilation albums during her career.

Suvas has recorded several Finnish versions of international songs. Some of the most successful ones are "Viet itsekontrollin" (1984), originally "Self Control" by Laura Branigan, and "Pure mua" (1992), a cover of a Lalo Rodríguez song "Ven, devórame otra vez". In 2012, Meiju Suvas appeared as a featured guest, along with a rapper Stig, on a Teflon Brothers single "Seksikkäin jäbä". In the video, she is seen bathing in a Jacuzzi with Stig while singing a sampled line from her 1983 song "Pidä musta kiinni".

== Personal life ==
Meiju Suvas is married to John "Jontte" Berger. They have two children.

== Discography ==
=== Studio albums ===
- Meiju (1982)
- Pidä musta kiinni (1983)
- Tottakai (1984)
- Rakkauden huoneet (1986)
- Sydän tietää (1990)
- Pure mua (1992)
- Kaunotar ja kulkuri (1993)
- Ystäväsi aina (1994)
- Hokkuspokkus (1995)
- Sukella sieluun asti (1996)
- Sydänmyrsky (1998)
- Taikavoima silmien (2001)
- Missä milloin vaan (2012)

=== Compilations ===
- Tahdon sinut (1992)
- Suomen parhaat (1994)
- 20 Suosikkia – Pure mua (1995)
- 20 Suosikkia – Sydänmyrsky (1999)
- 20 Suosikkia – Viet itsekontrollin (2001)
- Hitit (2004)
- Tähtisarja – 30 suosikkia (2006)
- Juhlalevy Pure mua (2010)

=== Singles ===
Featured in

Year	Single	Peak Position	Album
Year	Single	FIN	Album
2013	"Seksikkäin jäbä" (Teflon Brothers featuring Stig & Meiju Suvas)	3	Valkoisten dyynien ratsastajat
2019	"Keski-Suomeen" (Lord Est featuring Meiju Suvas)	?	single
