= Maradona (kesä '86) =

2014 single by Teflon Brothers

Single by Teflon Brothers

from the album Isänpäivä
- Released: 17 June 2014
- Recorded: 2014
- Genre: Pop / electronic music
- Length: 3:47
- Label: Johanna Kustannus

Teflon Brothers singles chronology
"Kendo Anthem" (2014)	"Maradona (kesä '86)" (2014)	"Pämppää" (2015)

"Maradona (kesä '86)" is a 2014 song by Finnish band Teflon Brothers. Released on 17 June 2014, the song peaked at number one on the Finnish Singles Chart.

== Chart performance ==
Chart (2014)	Peak position
Finland (Suomen virallinen lista)	1
