= Outta My Head (album) =

2012 studio album by Diandra

Studio album by Diandra
- Released: 6 July 2012
- Recorded: 2012
- Genre: Pop
- Label: Universal Music Finland

Outta My Head is the debut album of the Finnish singer Diandra (full name Diandra Flores) after she won the 2012 series of the Finnish version of Idols. The album was released on 6 July 2012 by Universal Music Finland and topped the Finnish Albums Chart.

The debut single of Diandra called "Onko Marsissa lunta?" appears as a bonus track on the album. The follow-up single is the title track "Outta My Head".

== Track listing ==
1. "Like a Tattoo"
2. "Outta My Head"
3. "Only Girl in the World"
4. "Prinsessalle"
5. "Maailma on sun"
6. "A Reason Why"
7. "Listen"
8. "Why Can't My Heart Break"
9. "Born This Way"
10. "I Have Nothing"
11. "Onko Marsissa lunta?" (bonus)

== Charts ==
Chart (2012)	Peak position
Finnish Albums Chart	1
