= Spekti =

- Also known as: Spekti (2006–); Aspekti (1999–2008); Uncle Damn (1998)
- Born: Juho Samuli Huhtala; 4 December 1979 (age 46)
- Origin: Helsinki, Finland
- Genre: Rap
- Occupation: Rapper
- Instrument: Vocals
- Years active: 1999–present
- Label: Rähinä Records

Juho Samuli Huhtala, professionally known as Spekti and previously as Aspekti and Uncle Damn, is a Finnish rapper.

== Career ==
Spekti started his career in the band Trilogia in 1999. Since then, he has appeared as a featured artist on several songs, such as "Reissumies" and "Pyrkiny vähentää" by Cheek, and "A-Ha", "Rotko" and "Rähinä räp" by Fintelligens.

Spekti's first solo single, "Mogausmehuu", was released in 2010. In 2013, he released two more solo singles, "Teen mitä haluun" and "Juomalaulu". All three singles appear on his first studio album Diktaattorimies, released in October 2013.

== Personal life ==
He is married to Emelie Björnberg. She is a fashion designer and a blogger.

== Discography ==
=== Solo albums ===
Year	Title	Peak position
Year	Title	FIN
2013	Diktaattorimies	20
2014	Macho Fantastico	18
2019	Rakas Spektistan	7

=== Singles ===
Solo singles

Year	Title	Peak position	Album
Year	Title	FIN	Album
2010	"Mogausmehuu" (featuring Tasis)	–	Diktaattorimies
2013	"Teen mitä haluun" (featuring Setä Tamu)	–	Diktaattorimies
2013	"Juomalaulu" (featuring Tasis)	7	Diktaattorimies
2014	"Macho Fantastico" (featuring Tasis)	1	Macho Fantastico
2017	"Juna" (featuring Tasis)	2	
2018	"Hei me lennetään" (featuring Tasis)	20	
2018	"Forza Italia"	16	
2019	"Pitkä perjantai"	14	
2019	"Ennen ku mä delaan"	10	

Featured in

Year	Title	Peak position	Album
Year	Title	FIN	Album
2010	"Pojat on poikii" (Uniikki featuring Elastinen & Spekti)	10	Juokse poika juokse
2011	"Kunnon mestaan vetää" (Uniikki featuring Elastinen & Spekti)	–	Suurempaa
2012	"Pyrkiny vähentää" (Cheek featuring Spekti)	10	Sokka irti
2013	"Loppuviikko" (Elastinen featuring Uniikki, Timo Pieni Huijaus, Tasis & Spekti)	12	Joka päivä koko päivä
2014	"Hanat auki" (Lord Est featuring Spekti)	13	–
