= Rähinä Records =

- Founded: 2003; 23 years ago
- Founder: Kimmo Laiho; Henrik Rosenberg; Dan Tolppanen; Anders Westerholm; Markku Wettenranta
- Country of origin: Finland
- Location: Helsinki

Rähinä Records is an independent rap label in Finland. It was founded 1998 by Elastinen, Iso H, Andu, Tasis, and Uniikki, and started actual business in 2003. The name Rähinä Records is a brand name. The company also has a sublabel Alarm Entertainment. Rähinä Records expanded in 2005, and started producing videos. In charge of Rähinä Films is a young director promise Lauri Aalto. Rähinä Records Oy continues to grow and started a clothing line called "Varuste" in 2006.

== Artists ==
=== Rähinä Records ===
- Brandon
- Brädi
- Cheek
- Fintelligens (Iso H and Elastinen)
- Illi
- Joniveli
- Kapasiteettiyksikkö (Uniikki, Tasis and Andu)
- Puhuva Kone
- Spekti
- Timo Pieni Huijaus
- Wava
- Ike

== Releases ==
RRCD03: Rähinä Records: Pommi 3 – Perhealbumi (2005)

- RRCD04: Brandon: The Outcome (2005)
- RRCD05: Joniveli: Ajatuksen voimalla (2005)
- RRCD06: Uniikki: Aika ei venaa ketään(2005)
- RRCD07: Kapasiteettiyksikkö: Susijengi (2006)
- RRCD08: Elastinen: Anna soida (2006)
- RRCD09: Cheek: Kasvukipuja (2007)
- RRCD10: Iso H: Lähelle on pitkä matka (2007)
- RRCD11: Elastinen: E.L.A. (2007)
- RRCD12: Kapasiteettiyksikkö: I <3 KY (2008)
- RRCD13: Cheek: Kuka sä oot (2008)
- RRCD14: Joniveli: Hallittu kaaos (2008)
- RRCD15: Fintelligens: Lisää (2008)
- RRCD16: Cheek: Jare Henrik Tiihonen (2009)
- RRCD17: Redrama: The Getaway (2009)
- RRCD18: Uniikki: Juokse poika juokse (2009)
- RRCD19: Redrama: Samma på svenska (2009)
- RRCD20: Fintelligens: Mun tie tai maantie (2010)
- RRCD21: Brädi: Repullinen hiittiä (2010)
- RRCD22: Cheek: Jare Henrik Tiihonen 2 (2010)
- RRCD23: Puhuva Kone: Jokainen tavallaan (2010 Rähinä Records/Universal Music)
- RRCD23: Timo Pieni Huijaus: Emävale (2010)
- RRCD24: Rähinä Records: Rähinä 4 Life -kokoelma (2010)
- RRCD25: Uniikki: Suurempaa (2011)
- RRCD26: Cheek: Jare Henrik Tiihonen 1 & 2 -kokoelma (2011)
- RRCD27: Fintelligens: Täytyy tuntuu (2011)
- RRCD28: Puhuva Kone: Tää hetki (2011 Rähinä Records/Universal Music)

== Mixtapes ==
- Pommi 1 (2003)
- Pommi 2 (2003)
- Brandon - This Town: The Mixtape (2004)
- Boy Mike - Heat (2005)
- Elastinen & Timo Pieni Huijaus - E.T.T.E. (2006)
- Boy Mike - Fakir Boyz Vol. 1 (2006)
- Uniikki - Nuor Tolppanen vol. 1 (2008)
