= Voli (rapper) =

- Also known as: Voli McRae, Jan Salanick, Voli Holiwood
- Born: Jani Tuohimaa
- Origin: Finland
- Genre: Rap
- Instrument: Vocals

Jani Tuohimaa, professionally known as Voli, is a Finnish rapper. His first release was a 2004 album Hoodipihvii with fellow rapper Heikki Kuula. In 2006 they teamed up again for an album Wordcup. Voli is also a member of the hip hop and rap group Teflon Brothers, along with Heikki Kuula and Pyhimys. The band has released four albums.

== Selected discography ==
=== Heikki Kuula and Voli ===
Year	Title	Peak position
Year	Title	FIN
2004	Hoodipihvii	–
2006	Wordcup	–

=== Teflon Brothers ===
Year	Title	Peak position
Year	Title	FIN
2009	T	26
2010	©	26
2013	Valkoisten dyynien ratsastajat	6
2014	Isänpäivä	49
