= Haastaja (song) =

Single by Jontte Valosaari
- Released: 15 February 2013
- Length: 3:11
- Label: EMI Finland
- Songwriters: Jontte Valosaari; Henri Lanz; Will Rappaport; Heidi Paalanen

Jontte Valosaari singles chronology
"Jos mä oisin sun mies" (2012)	"Haastaja" (2013)	"Kiinni jäit" (2014)

"Haastaja" is a song by Finnish pop singer Jontte Valosaari. Released as the second single from Valosaari's debut album of the same name, the song peaked at number 18 on the Finnish Download Chart.

== Chart performance ==
Chart (2013)	Peak position
Finland (The Official Finnish Download Chart)	18
