= OG Ikonen =

- Born: Joni Ikonen
- Genres: Gangsta rap, G-funk
- Label: 3rd Rail Music

Joni Ikonen, better known as OG Ikonen (Original Gangsta Ikonen), is a Finnish rapper.

== Career ==
Ikonen is signed to 3rd Rail Music. His first studio album Mieron tiellä was released in 2009 and reached number 38 on The Official Finnish Charts. OG Mixtape, his second solo release, was released in 2012. OG Ikonen belongs to a rap duo called Vitun kova ääni with rapper Liigalaiska. The duo has released an EP (Vitun kova ääni, 2010) and two studio albums, Aikatauluis in 2011 and Se kuulee jotai äänii ku se kattelee tonne... in 2012. In 2014, Ikonen released his second full-length album Se on gangsta.

== Discography ==
=== Albums ===
- 2009: Mieron tiellä

=== Mixtapes ===
- 2012: OG Mixtape

=== Vitun kova ääni ===
- 2010: Vitun kova ääni (EP)
- 2011: Aikatauluis
- 2012: Se kuulee jotai äänii ku se kattelee tonne...

=== Music videos ===
- "The Death of Kevin Lomax" (2007)
- "Liikun vain öisin" (2010)
- "Uhusia" (Vitun kova ääni, 2011)
- "Harson läpi" (Vitun kova ääni feat. Yona, 2011)
- "Sienestä" (Vitun kova ääni, 2012)
