= Teflon Brothers =

Hip hop and rap group from Helsinki, Finland

- Origin: Finland
- Genres: Hip hop
- Years active: 2006–present
- Labels: Yellowmic Records (2006–2009), Monsp Records (2009–2012), Johanna Kustannus (2012–present)
- Members: Heikki Kuula; Voli
- Past members: Pyhimys

Teflon Brothers is a Finnish hip hop group originally from Helsinki, Finland. The band consists of Heikki Kuula and Voli. The third founding member Pyhimys was kicked out in 2026 due to controversies.

== Commercial success ==
Teflon Brothers released their first single "Matkal kotiin" in 2006. It was also featured on a soundtrack for a film Adihasla. Their first album T followed in 2009 and peaked at number 26 on the Official Finnish Albums Chart. In April 2010, they offered a free mixtape Iso hätä, which featured songs by other artists as well.

The second Teflon Brothers album © was released in August 2010, also peaking at number 26 on the albums chart. In January 2013, the group reached number nine with their third album, Valkoisten dyynien ratsastajat. The song "Seksikkäin jäbä", featuring Stig and Meiju Suvas, also managed to enter the Official Finnish Singles Chart where it peaked at number three.

In 2014, their single "Kendo Anthem" also reached number three on the singles chart and was quickly followed by their first number-one single, "Maradona (kesä '86)". Both are included on their fourth album, Isänpäivä.

The same year, Teflon Brothers started to look for a new member to join the group through an online bidding, and hired a professional poker player Ilari Sahamies who paid 50,000 euros for the position. Sahamies appears as a featured guest on the group's 2015 song "Pämppää".

In 2021, Teflon Brothers attempted to get to represent Finland in the Eurovision Song Contest 2021. They participated in the Finnish national selection Uuden Musiikin Kilpailu with the song "I Love You", featuring Swedish singer Pandora. Eventually, they ended up in 2nd place with 180 points (2nd place with televoters and 5th with the international juries).

In June 2022, Teflon Brothers revealed they had signed a recording contract with the Estonian Universal Music Group.

== Discography ==
=== Studio albums ===
Year	Title	Peak position
Year	Title	FIN
2009	T	26
2010	©	26
2013	Valkoisten dyynien ratsastajat	6
2014	Isänpäivä	49
2017	Circus	4
2021	Loppuunmyyty	5

=== Mixtapes ===
- 2010: Iso hätä

=== Singles ===
Year	Title	Peak position	Album
Year	Title	FIN	Album
2006	"Matkal kotiin"	–	–
2009	"Vexi oli velkaa"	–	T
2009	"Viimeinen puritaani"	–	T
2011	"Erkkaa lapaan"	–	–
2012	"Poimunopeus"	–	Valkoisten dyynien ratsastajat
2012	"Lähestymiskieloja"	–	Valkoisten dyynien ratsastajat
2013	"Seksikkäin jäbä" (featuring Stig & Meiju Suvas)	3	Valkoisten dyynien ratsastajat
2014	"Kendo Anthem"	3	Isänpäivä
2014	"Maradona (kesä '86)"	1	Isänpäivä
2015	"Pämppää" (featuring Sahamies)	1	Circus
2015	"Ay ay ay" (featuring Tango-Teemu)	3	Circus
2015	"Juusto katolle" (featuring Setä Tamu)	3	Circus
2016	"Lähiöunelmii" (featuring Mariska)	3	Circus
2016	"Hubba Bubba" (featuring Ressu Redford and Heavyweight)	2	Circus
2016	"Rio ohoi!" (featuring Ollie)	20	Circus
2016	"Siivet" (featuring Aku Hirviniemi)	14	Circus
2017	"Arvon leidit"	16	Circus
2017	"Sit mennään"	7	Circus
2017	"Manteli" (with Spekti and Petri Nygård)	5	–
2018	"Maradona (En Español)"	19	–
2018	"Perutaan häät"	3	Vain elämää kausi 9
2018	"Kuka antais pukille?" (with Spekti and Petri Nygård)	3	–
2019	"Harmaa rinne"	1	–
2019	"Marijuana" (with Stereo)	9	–
2019	"Juhannussimaa"	3	–
2019	"Tee mulle joulu" (with Spekti and Petri Nygård)	6	–
2020	"Bakara" (with Tinze)	3	–
2021	"I Love You" (with Pandora)	2	N/A
2021	"Ilmastonmuutos" (with Emma Gun)	9	N/A
2021	"Munatoti" (with Spekti and Petri Nygård)	12	N/A
2021	"Just Do It" (with DJ Oku Luukkainen and Günther)	10	N/A
2022	"Eesti (On My Mind)"	11	N/A
2022	"Nautin elämästä" (with Portion Boys)	5	N/A
2023	"Myrskyn jälkeen" (with Poju)	25	N/A

As featured artist

Year	Title	Peak position	Album
Year	Title	FIN	Album
2016	"Juha88" (Vilma Alina featuring Teflon Brothers)	2	–
2016	"Original gigolo" (Stig featuring Teflon Brothers)	16	–
