= Brädi =

Finnish hip hop artist

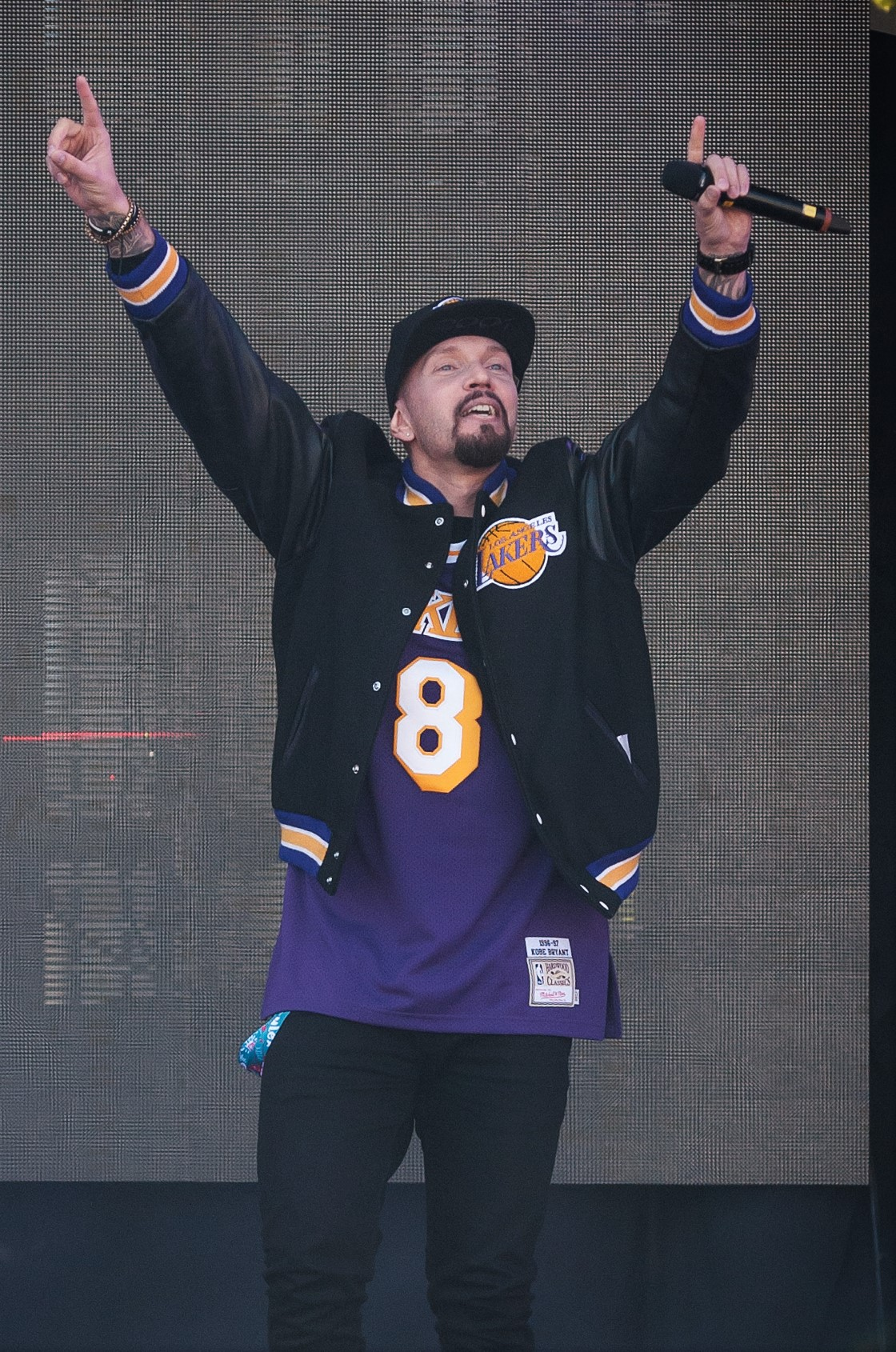
- Brädi in 2017

Background information
- Also known as: A'damite (2001–2002); Brad Spitt (2003–2005); Brädi (2004–)
- Born: Kari Olavi Härkönen; 9 April 1979 (age 47); Finland
- Genre: Hip hop
- Years active: 2001 – present
- Label: Rähinä Records
- Website: www.rahina.com/artistit/bradi

Kari Olavi "Kapa" Härkönen (born 9 April 1979), better known by his stage name Brädi, is a Finnish rapper. Brädi (pronounced "Braddy") has sung in Finnish and in English (the latter mostly under the name Brad Spitt), in bands and solo.

== Career ==
Beginnings

He started his musical career under the name A'damite in 2001. He eventually joined the Finnish hip hop band 5th Element and had three albums with the band.

He was also part of the hip hop trio Herrasmiesliiga with Cheek and TS. He opened many times for Cheek gigs as "tuplaamassa" (double mass) shows. He collaborated with Cheek in the music videos "Huligaani", "Raplaulajan vapaapäivä", "Täältä sinne", "Liekeissä", "Jos mä oisin sä", "Viihdyttäjä" and "Maanteiden kingi".

He has also appeared in recordings by Näkökulma, Maajoukkue, A04 and MGI.

Solo career

Brädi's first solo studio album was Repullinen hiittiä released in May 2010. The album was produced by MGI. He also issued the mixtape Repullinen remixejä in 2012. He is preparing a new album after signing with Rähinä Records in 2012. His single "Lämpöö" featuring Redrama reached the Top 10 in Finland.

== Personal life ==
Brädi started as a sportsman playing basketball and is an announcer for the Finnish Namika Lahti basketball club's home games.

== Discography ==
=== Albums ===
in 5th Element

- 2002: I
- 2004: Kakkonen
- 2005: 2,8‰

in Herrasmiesliiga

(with Cheek and TS)

- 2006: Herrasmiesliiga

Solo

Year	Title	Peak chart positions
Year	Title	FIN
2010	Repullinen hiittiä	14
2012	Näis kengis	39
2014	III	4

=== Mixtapes ===
Year	Title
2012	Repullinen remixejä

=== Singles ===
Year	Title	Peak chart positions	Album
Year	Title	FIN	Album
2010	"Mä tarjoon" (feat. Illi)	5	Repullinen hiittiä
2010	"Kuka hän on"	—	Repullinen hiittiä
2010	"Kato mun käteen"	—	Repullinen hiittiä
2012	"Lämpöö" (feat. Redrama)	1	Näis kengis
2014	"Hätähuuto" (feat. Toni Wirtanen)	5	III
2014	"Uimaan" (feat. PistePiste)	17	III
2016	"Kombo" (feat. Evelina)	12	Non-album singles
2016	"Saturnus" (feat. Illi)	10	Non-album singles

Featured in

Year	Single	FIN	Album
Year	Single	FIN	Album
2012	"Puuttuva palanen" (Robin feat. Brädi)	4	Robin album Chillaa

=== Music videos ===
- 2010: "Mä tarjoon"
- 2010: "Kato mun käteen"
