= Steen1 =

Finnish rap musician (born 1976)

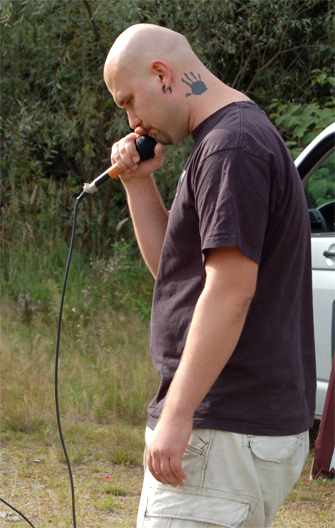
- Steen1 performing on September 8, 2007.

Background information
- Born: Seppo Lampela; 1976 (age 49–50)
- Origin: Helsinki, Finland
- Genres: Finnish hip hop, Hardcore hip hop, Gangsta rap, Political hip hop, Punk
- Label: Monsp Records
- Website: http://www.steen1.com/

Seppo Kalervo Lampela (born 1976 in Helsinki, Finland), professionally known as Steen1, is a Finnish rap musician. He originally chose the name Steen Christensen, after the Danish criminal who shot two Finnish policemen in 1997, as his moniker, but changed it due to controversy.

In 2004 Steen1 released his debut album entitled Salaliittoteoria (Conspiracy Theory). In September 2005 his second full-length, Varasta pomolta (Steal from the Boss) was released. His lyrics tend to feature aggressive, anti-establishment social critique. His Rap song "Terroristi" (Terrorist) was in the Finnish teen movie Tyttö sinä olet tähti (Beauty and the Bastard) and his rap song "Sinisiä rappuja ja punaisia hintalappuja" ("Blue steps and red price tags") was in the movie Paha maa (lit. Evil Land)

Steen1 ran for the Parliament of Finland in the 2007 elections representing the Communist Party of Finland (SKP). He received the most votes among SKP candidates, but failed to get elected.

In 2026 Steen1 announced he is working on a new true crime book with Jyrki "Spider" Hämäläinen.

== Discography ==
=== Albums ===
- Salaliittoteoria (2004)
- Varasta pomolta (2005)
- Ajatusrikoksia (compilation, 2007)
- Runoja kontrollihuoneesta (2009)
- Pesismaila ja Ananas (under the moniker Liekehtivä sikiö)(2009)
- Bensaahan ne pojat tuli hakemaan (with Jussi Lampi) (2011)
- Jedin paluu (2011)

=== Singles ===
- Samaa uudestaan (feat. Saimaa) (2005)
- Terroristi (feat. Asa) (2006)
- Marssi (feat. Iso H & Redrama) (2007)
- Tennispallobiisi (With Jussi Lampi) (2011)
- Itä-Helsinki (2012)

=== EPs ===
- Nottinghamin paskasheriffi (2006)
- Valkoinen jänis (2007)
- Paskasheriffin paluu (2010)

== Bibliography ==
- Hullu klovni - 2008
