= Diandra (Finnish singer) =

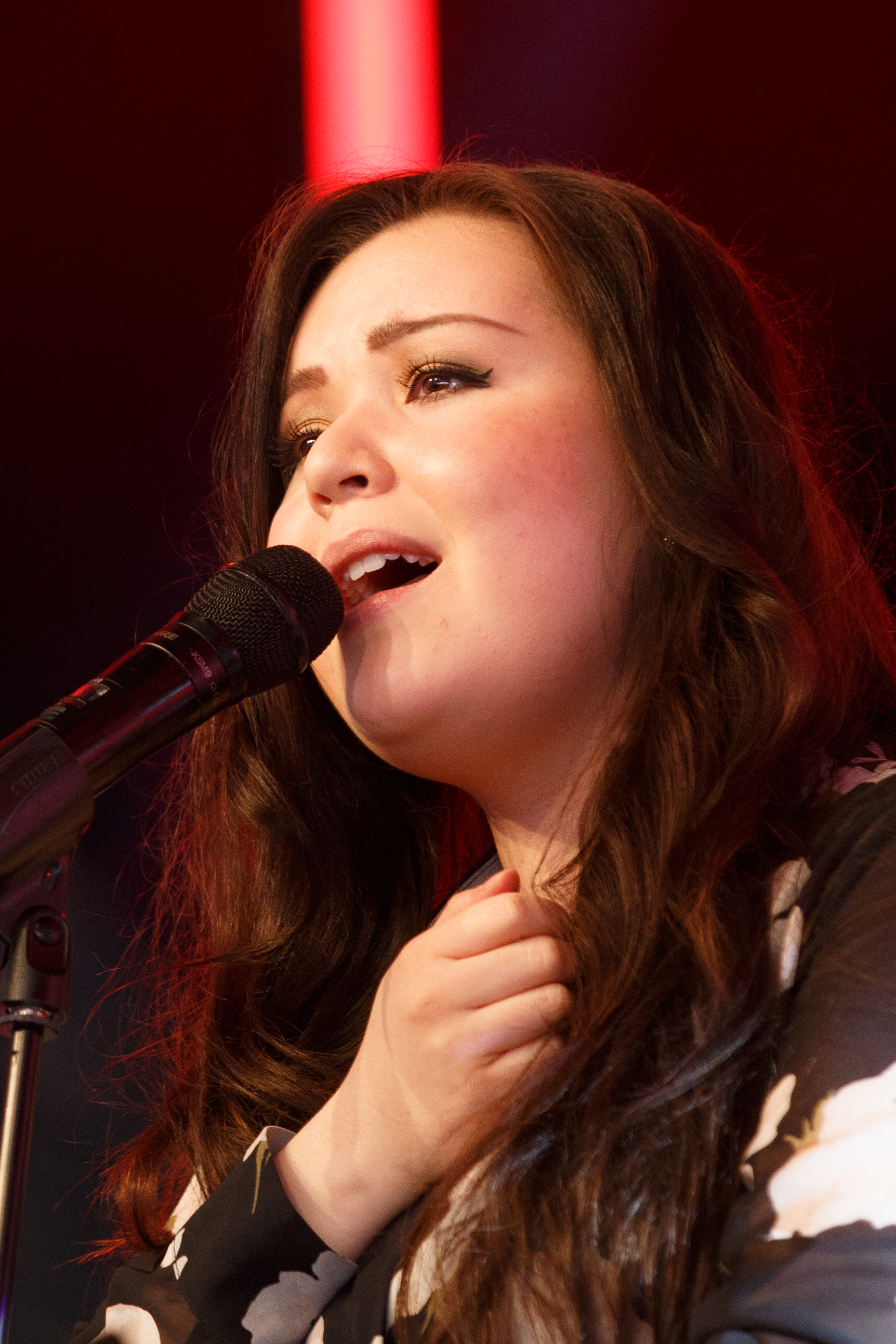
- Diandra in 2019

Background information
- Born: Diandra Danielle Flores; 12 August 1994 (age 32)
- Origin: Hyvinkää, Finland
- Genres: Pop
- Occupations: Singer, songwriter
- Instrument: Vocals
- Years active: 2012–present
- Label: Universal Music Group

Diandra Danielle Flores (born 12 August 1994), better known by her stage name Diandra, is a Finnish pop singer who rose to fame as the winner of the sixth season of the Finnish singing competition Idols in 2012. She is the youngest winner of Finland's Idols. Her debut album Outta My Head was released in July 2012.

== Career ==
In Autumn 2004, when she was just 10, Diandra won Staraoke, a Finnish children singing competition. Her father is from Chile and her mother from Finland. She made a TV comeback in Idols 2012. Immediately after winning Idols, Diandra signed a recording contract with Universal Music and released her debut single "Onko Marsissa lunta?" followed by "Outta My Head". Her debut album Outta My Head was released on 5 July 2012, only two months after she won Idols. She was the second woman to win Idols after Hanna Pakarinen. She performed the English-language song "Light Up the Ice" as the theme music to the 2017 World Figure Skating Championships.

== Discography ==
=== Albums ===
| Year | Album | Charts | Certifications |
| Year | Album | FIN | Certifications |
|---|---|---|---|
| 2012 | Outta My Head | 1 | FIN: Gold |
| 2014 | Dynamiittii | 12 | |
| 2015 | Kerran Joulukuun Aikaan | 15 | |

=== Singles ===
| Year | Single | Charts | Album |
| Year | Single | FIN | Album |
|---|---|---|---|
| 2012 | "Onko Marsissa lunta?" | – | Appeared as bonus on Outta My Head |
| 2012 | "Outta My Head" | 16 | Outta My Head |
| 2012 | "Prinsessalle" | – | Outta My Head |
| 2013 | "Colliding Into You" | – | Uuden Musiikin Kilpailu 2013 |
| 2013 | "Lost" | – | – |
| 2014 | "Paha poika" | 1 | Dynamiittii |
| 2016 | "Huitoo" (featuring Cheek) | 20 | |

As a featured artist

| Year | Title | Peak position | Album |
| Year | Title | FIN | Album |
|---|---|---|---|
| 2015 | "Viimeisen kerran" (Mikael Gabriel featuring Diandra) | 4 | – |
| 2023 | "Köyhä laulaa" (Aste featuring Diandra) | 14 | Non-album single |
