= Mikael Gabriel =

Finnish rapper

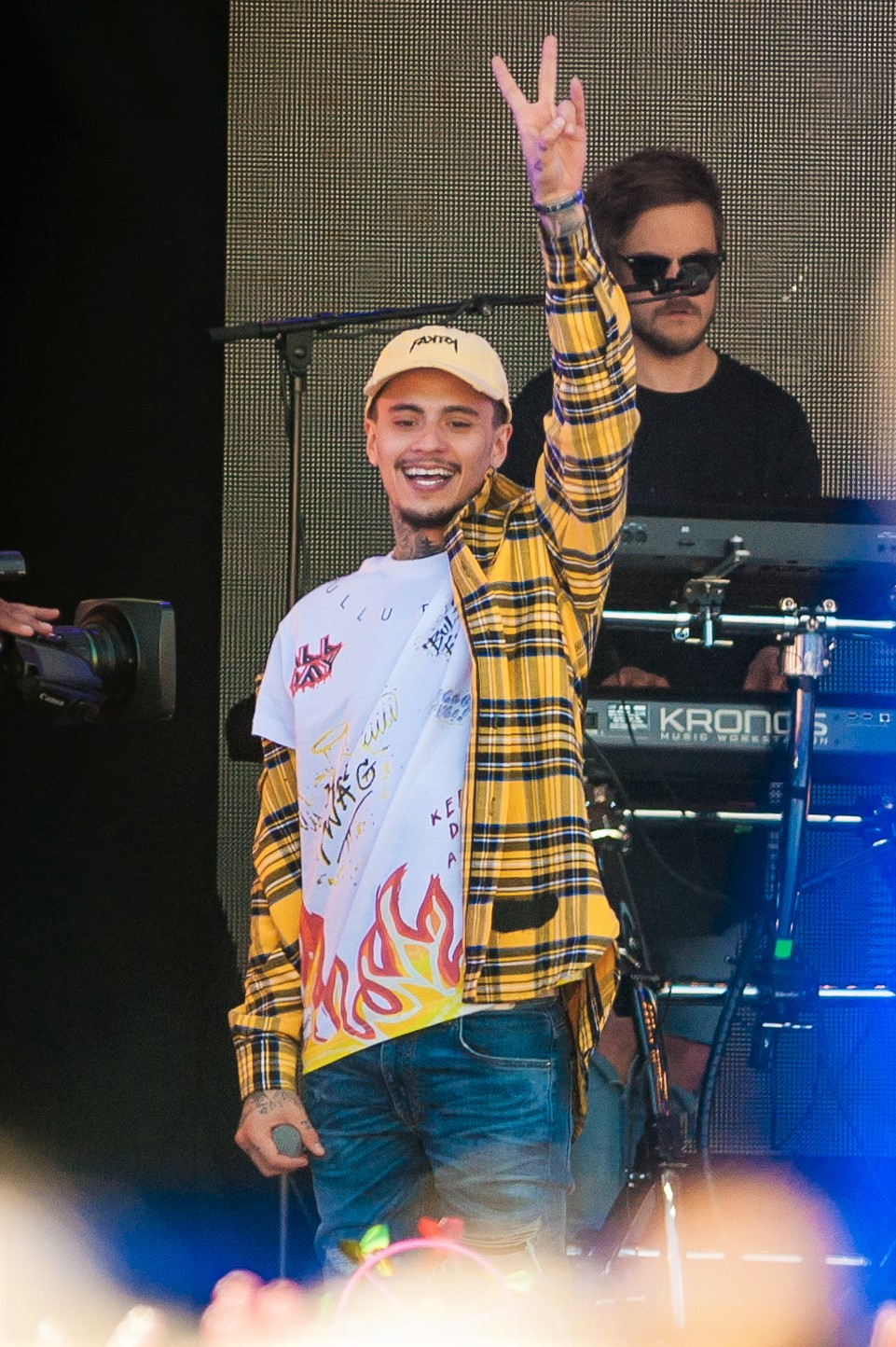
- Mikael Gabriel in 2017

Background information
- Born: Mikael Kristian Gabriel Sohlman; 25 February 1990 (age 36)
- Origin: Helsinki, Finland
- Genre: Hip hop
- Occupation: Rapper
- Years active: 2008–present
- Labels: Helsinki Freedom Records (2008–2010); Universal Music Group (2010–present)
- Partner: Triana Iglesias (2017–present)

Mikael Kristian Gabriel Sohlman (born 25 February 1990), professionally known as Mikael Gabriel or MG, is a Finnish rapper. He has released six solo albums and appeared as a featured guest on songs by artists such as Cheek, Lord Est, Robin and Uniikki. In 2016 Mikael Gabriel made his acting debut in a horror film Bodom, inspired by the 1960 Lake Bodom murders, and also appeared in the Antti Jokinen film Pahan kukat. He participated in the fifth season of the music reality television series Vain elämää and was one of the judges on the second season of the Finnish version of X Factor in 2018.

On 10 January 2024, he and Nublu were announced as participants of Uuden Musiikin Kilpailu 2024, the Finnish national final for the Eurovision Song Contest 2024, with the song "Vox populi".

Mikael Gabriel's father was a Swedish-speaking Finn and his mother, Liidia, is Estonian. His mother raised him as a single parent and he did not meet his father until he was in his teens.

== Selected discography ==
=== Albums ===
Year	Title	Peak position
Year	Title	FIN
2009	5 miljoonaa muuta	–
2011	Pohjosen poika	9
2013	Mun maailma	20
2015	Versus	2
2018	Ääripäät	1
2021	Elonmerkki	5
2022	Big Steppa	2

=== Singles ===
As lead artist

Year	Title	Peak position	Album
Year	Title	FIN	Album
2013	"Kipua"	12	Mun maailma
2014	"Woppaa" (featuring Kevin Tandu)	7	Versus
2014	"Älä herätä mua unesta"	2	Versus
2015	"Viimeisen kerran" (featuring Diandra)	4	Versus
2015	"Mimmit fiilaa"	18	Versus
2016	"Helium"	2	–
2016	"Pauhaava sydän"	1	Vain elämää – Kausi 5: Ensimmäinen kattaus
2016	"Mun koti ei oo täällä"	3	Vain elämää – Kausi 5: Ensimmäinen kattaus
2016	"Lumi teki enkelin eteiseen"	1	Vain elämää – Kausi 5: Ensimmäinen kattaus
2016	"Tyhjässä huoneessa"	4	Vain elämää – Kausi 5: Toinen kattaus
2016	"Loistat pimeäs"	1	–
2017	"Liikaa sussa kii" (with Isac Elliot)	1	–
2017	"Ring Ring Ring" (with Isac Elliot)	7	–
2017	"Rullaan" (with Isac Elliot)	17	–
2017	"Riippumatto"	4	–
2017	"Maailman laidalla"	2	–
2017	"Pimeyteen"	4	Ääripäät
2018	"Timanttei"	1	Ääripäät
2018	"Naapurit kuulee"	3	Ääripäät
2018	"Älä huku kyyneliin"	14	Ääripäät
2019	"Lennokki" (with Vesa-Matti Loiri)	2	–
2020	"Löytäjä saa pitää"	4	–
2020	"Oli aikoi"	6	–
2021	"Intiaanikesä"	9	–
2021	"Vihje" (with Nublu)	8	–
2022	"Nallekarkit" (featuring JVG)	2	–
2022	"Kompassi"	17	–
2022	"Vainois"	20	–
2022	"Drama" (featuring Cledos)	6	–
2023	"Ruotsinlaiva"	18	–
2024	"Vox populi" (with Nublu)	4	–
2025	"Valinnu mun tien"	44	–
2025	"Sotilas" (featuring Senni)	22	–
2026	"Illat"	40	–
2026	"Lucky Me" (with Isac Elliot)	1	–
2026	"Hall of Fame" (with Isac Elliot)	4	–

As featured artist

Year	Title	Peak position	Album
Year	Title	FIN	Album
2011	"Vuosi vaihtuu" (Lord Est featuring Mikael Gabriel)	1	Sonmoro senjoro
2013	"Boom Kah" (Robin featuring Mikael Gabriel & Uniikki)	4	Boom Kah
2014	"Kiinni jäit" (Jontte Valosaari featuring Mikael Gabriel)	6	–
2015	"Honey" (Evelina featuring Mikael Gabriel)	1	–
2015	"Nimet listalla" (Tuuli featuring Mikael Gabriel)	16	–
2020	"Universum" (Nublu featuring Mikael Gabriel)	4	Cafe Kosmos
