= Fintelligens =

Finnish hip hop group

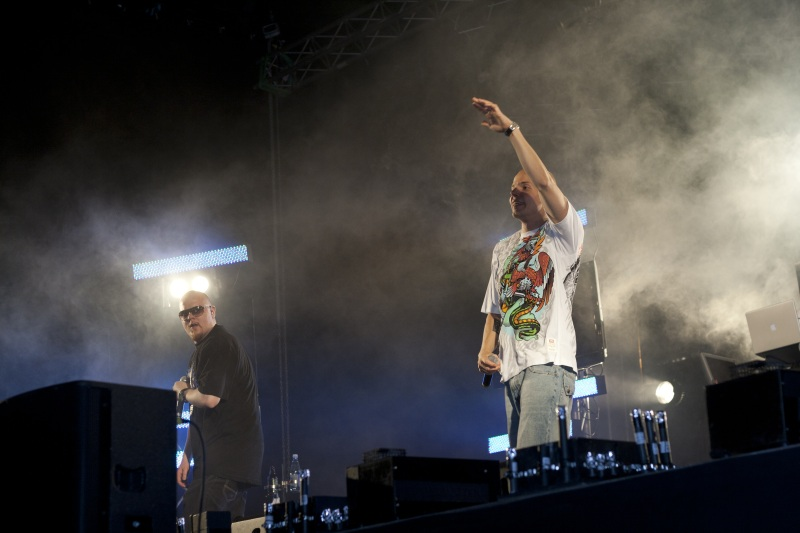
- Fintelligens Pipefest 2010

Background information
- Origin: Finland
- Genres: Hip hop
- Years active: 1997–present
- Labels: Sony Music
- Members: Elastinen; Iso H

Fintelligens is a hip hop group from Helsinki, Finland. The band is formed of two MCs: Elastinen and Iso H. The band has released three albums and one compilation, all selling more than 150,000 copies.

== Career ==
In the early 1990s the Finnish hip hop scene was dominated by more humorous acts, such as Raptori. For many years afterwards, Finnish hip hop was strongly seen as some kind of joke. When Fintelligens released their debut album Renesanssi in 2000, it was the first more serious mainstream record to emerge. Renesanssi was a success and went gold with hit singles Voittamaton, Kellareiden Kasvatit and a collaboration with Swedish MC's Petter and Peewee called Stockholm-Helsinki. The album started a boom in Finnish hip hop as record companies endeavored to sign their own rap artists.

In 2001 Fintelligens released the albums Tän Tahtiin and Kokemusten Summa in 2002, both creating hit singles and certified gold. Fintelligens also made the theme song to the 2003 Ice Hockey World Championships, titled Kaikki peliin. The song was a huge hit in Finland. In the same year they released a compilation album and both started to make solo albums.

Fintelligens were pioneers in creating a Finnish style of rap, and many other artists have been influenced by their style of rapping. Both Elastinen and Iso H produce beats also. Renesanssi included a couple of beats by both MCs, Tän tahtiin was mostly produced by Elastinen, and on Kokemusten Summa he provided all of the production. At the beginning of their careers, Elastinen and Iso H were heavily inspired by French hip hop.

The members of Fintelligens, together with Kapasiteettiyksikkö, are the founders of the Finnish independent hip hop record label Rähinä Records.

In 2008 Fintelligens released a new album titled "Lisää".

== Discography ==
=== Albums ===
Year	Album	Record label	Peak positions	Certification
Year	Album	Record label	FIN	Certification
2000	Renesanssi	Sony Music	3	
2001	Tän tahtiin	Sony Music	6	
2002	Kokemusten summa	Sony Music	3	
2008	Lisää	Rähinä Records	7	
2010	Mun tie tai maantie	Rähinä Records	3	
2010	Täytyy Tuntuu	Rähinä Records	7	

Compilation albums

Year	Album	Record label	Peak positions	Certification
Year	Album	Record label	FIN	Certification
2003	Nää vuodet 1997-2003	Sony Music	7	

=== Singles ===
Year	Single	Peak positions	Album
Year	Single	FIN	Album
2000	"Voittamaton"	8	Renesanssi
2000	"Kellareiden kasvatit"	2	Renesanssi
2000	"Stockholm - Helsinki" (feat. Petter & Peewee)	1	Renesanssi
2000	"Kelaa sitä"	7	Renesanssi
2001	"Pää pystyyn"	5	Tän tahtiin
2001	"Heruuks?"	3	Tän tahtiin
2002	"Kaks jannuu"	8	Tän tahtiin
2002	"Sori"	6	Kokemusten summa
2003	"Kaikki peliin"	1	Nää vuodet 1997–2003
2003	"Vaan sil on väliä"	5	Nää vuodet 1997–2003
2008	"Hoida homma"	20	Lisää
2010	"Mikä Boogie"	1	Mun tie tai maantie
2011	"Ei tekosyitä"	11	Täytyy tuntuu
2011	"Etkot, juhlat, jatkot (kesäkumit)" (feat. Cheek)"	13	Täytyy tuntuu
