= Iso H =

Finnish rap musician

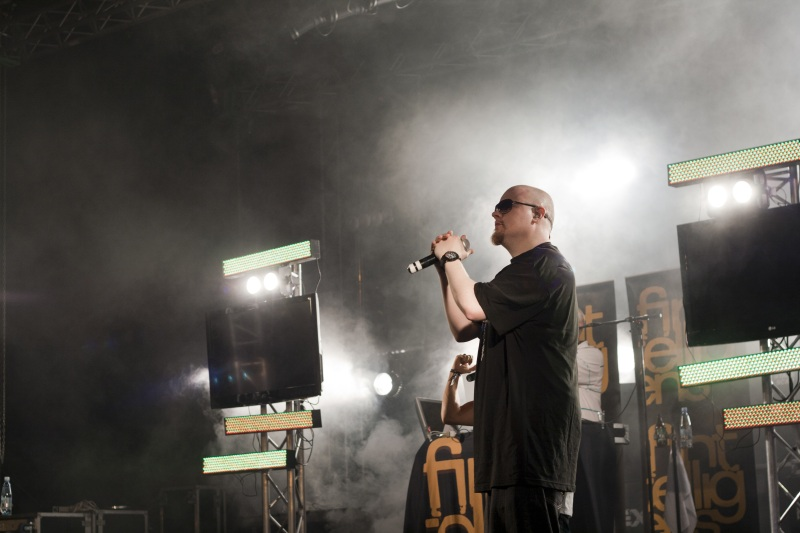
- Iso H in 2010

Background information
- Also known as: Iso H, Hoo
- Born: Carl Henrik Rosenberg; 11 January 1979 (age 47); Helsinki, Finland
- Genre: Hip hop
- Occupations: Rapper; singer; record producer; entrepreneur
- Years active: 1997–present
- Label: Rähinä Records
- Website: www.rahina.com/artistit/iso-h

Iso H (real name: Carl Henrik Rosenberg), born 11 January 1979 in Helsinki, is a Finnish rapper. Together with his colleague Elastinen, he formed the Finnish rap band Fintelligens.

== Imprisonment ==
On 30 June 2005, Iso H was sentenced to six and a half months in prison for refusing to enlist in the Finnish defence force or equivalent civilian service. He started serving his sentence on 20 March 2006 in a labour prison in Helsinki. He was released on 4 October 2006.

He released his first solo album, "Lähelle on pitkä matka," on 4 May 2007.

== Discography ==
Fintelligens albums

- Renesanssi (2000)
- Tän Tahtiin (2001)
- Kokemusten Summa (2002)
- Nää Vuodet 1997–2003 (2003)
- Lisää (2008)
- Mun Tie Tai Maantie (2010)

Solo albums

- Lähelle on Pitkä Matka (2007)

Solo singles

- 24H (2007)
