= Uniikki =

Finnish rapper

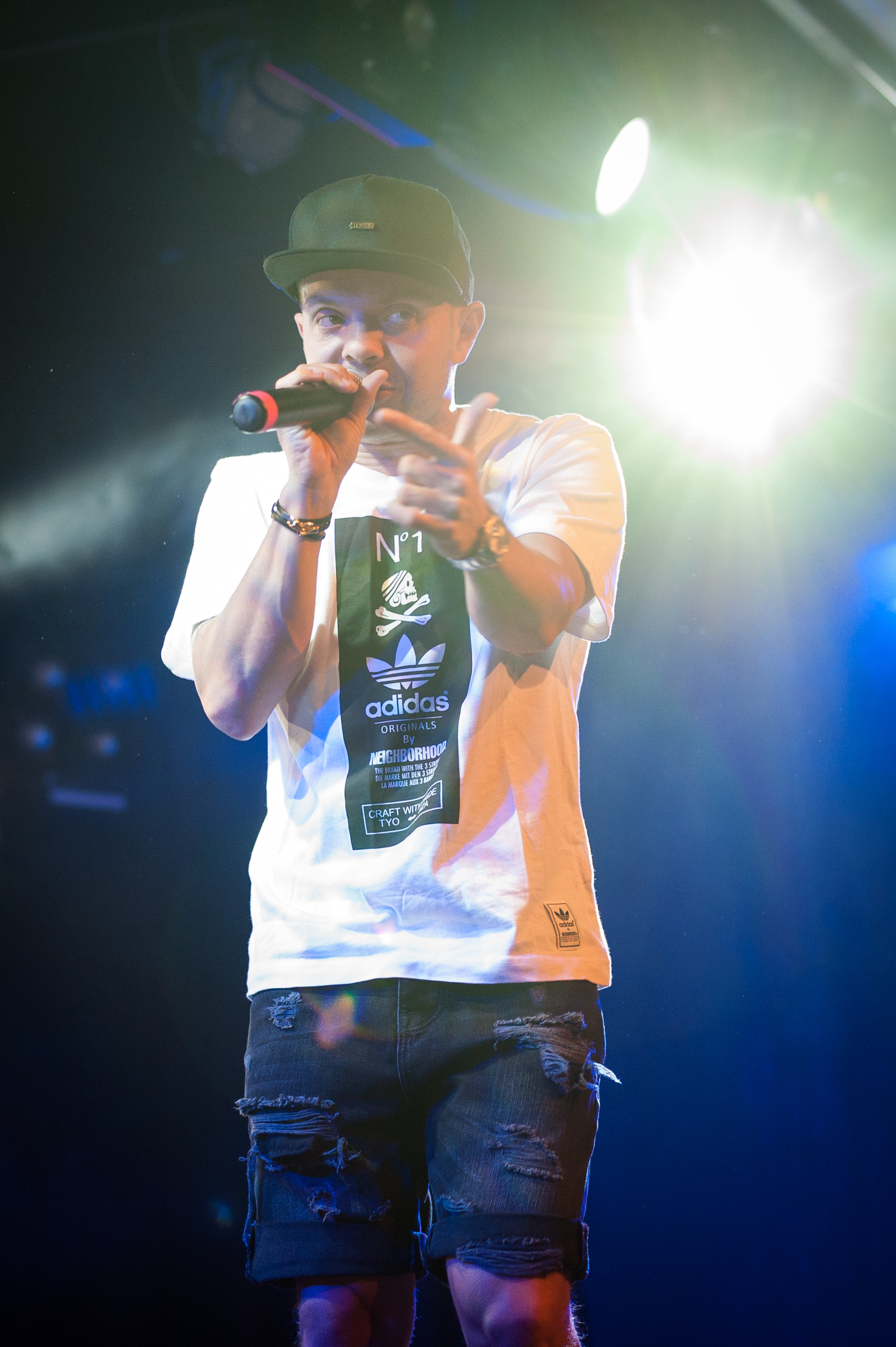
- Uniikki in 2015

Background information
- Also known as: Uniikki (2000–); Kid Unique; Mc Kid Complete
- Born: Dan Ahti Tolppanen; 11 June 1981 (age 45); Helsinki, Finland
- Genres: Hip hop; pop
- Occupations: Singer; songwriter; rapper; record producer
- Years active: 2001 – present
- Label: Rähinä Records
- Member of: Kapasiteettiyksikkö

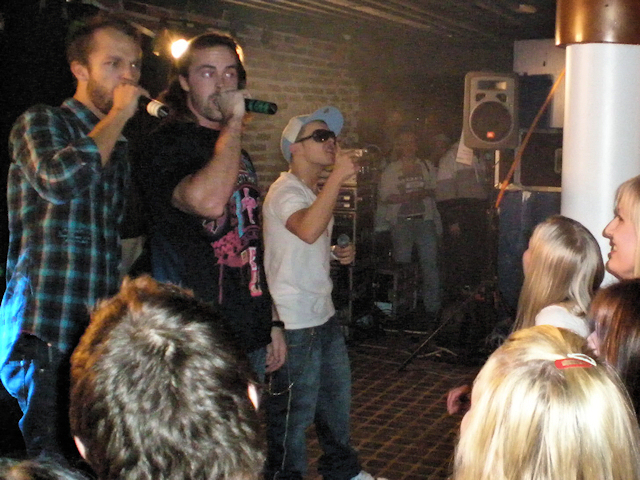
Uniikki in Kapasiteettiyksikkö

Dan Ahti Tolppanen (born 11 June 1981) is a Finnish singer, rapper and record producer, better known by his stage name Uniikki (meaning unique). He is the co-founder in of Rähinä Records (founded in 1998) with Elastinen, Iso H, Andu and Tasis.

Uniikki was born to a Jewish mother, who is of Polish-Jewish descent, and a Finnish father. Finnish politician Ben Zyskowicz is his maternal uncle. He grew up in Malminkartano, Helsinki. Uniikki gained fame through membership in Finnish band Kapasiteettiyksikkö. For some recordings, he appeared in Rähinä (effectively a duo effort of Elastinen & Uniikki). He works as a solo act, and signed to his own Rähinä Records, but also has a great number of collaborations.

== Discography ==
=== Albums ===
Year	Album	Peak position	Certifications	Notes
Year	Album	FIN	Certifications	Notes
2005	Aika ei venaa ketään	–		
2009	Juokse poika juokse	–		
2011	Suurempaa	24		
2012	Kiitorata	20		
2013	#Kylänmies	33		
2015	Pikku prinssi	–		

=== Mixtapes ===
- 2008: Nuor Tolppanen vol. 1
- 2011: 8190 (mixtape with MG:n)
- 2012: Nuor Tolppanen vol. 2

=== Singles ===
Charting

Year	Single	Peak position	Certifications	Album
Year	Single	FIN	Certifications	Album
2005	"Pojat on poikii" (feat. Elastinen & Spekti)	10		
2005	"Kotka" (feat Hookki-Heikki & MG)	13		

Others

- 2005: "En pyydä muuta" (with Illi)
- 2009: "Myrskyn silmäs" (with Mia)
- 2009: "Niinku elokuvis" (with Jimi Pääkallo)
- 2011: "Suurempaa" (with Mia)
- 2011: "Kesäbaustaa"
- 2011: "Kunnon mestaan vetää" (with Elastinen & Spekti)
- 2011: "Ulkopuolelle" (with Tasis)
- 2012: "Paita pois"
- 2012: (FIN #16)

Promotional singles

- 2008: "Vaik mitä tekis"
- 2008: "Sä et enää rakasta mua"
- 2009: "Tehdään tää näin" (with Wörlin & RZY)

As Rähinä – Elastinen & Uniikki

Year	Single	Peak position	Certifications	Album
Year	Single	FIN	Certifications	Album
2005	"Jeppiskamaa" (Rähinä – Elastinen & Uniikki)	8		

Featured in

Year	Title	Peak position	Album
Year	Title	FIN	Album
2013	"Loppuviikko" (Elastinen featuring Uniikki, Timo Pieni Huijaus, Tasis & Spekti)	12	Joka päivä koko päivä
2013	"Boom Kah" (Robin featuring Mikael Gabriel & Uniikki)	4	Boom Kah
