= Elastinen =

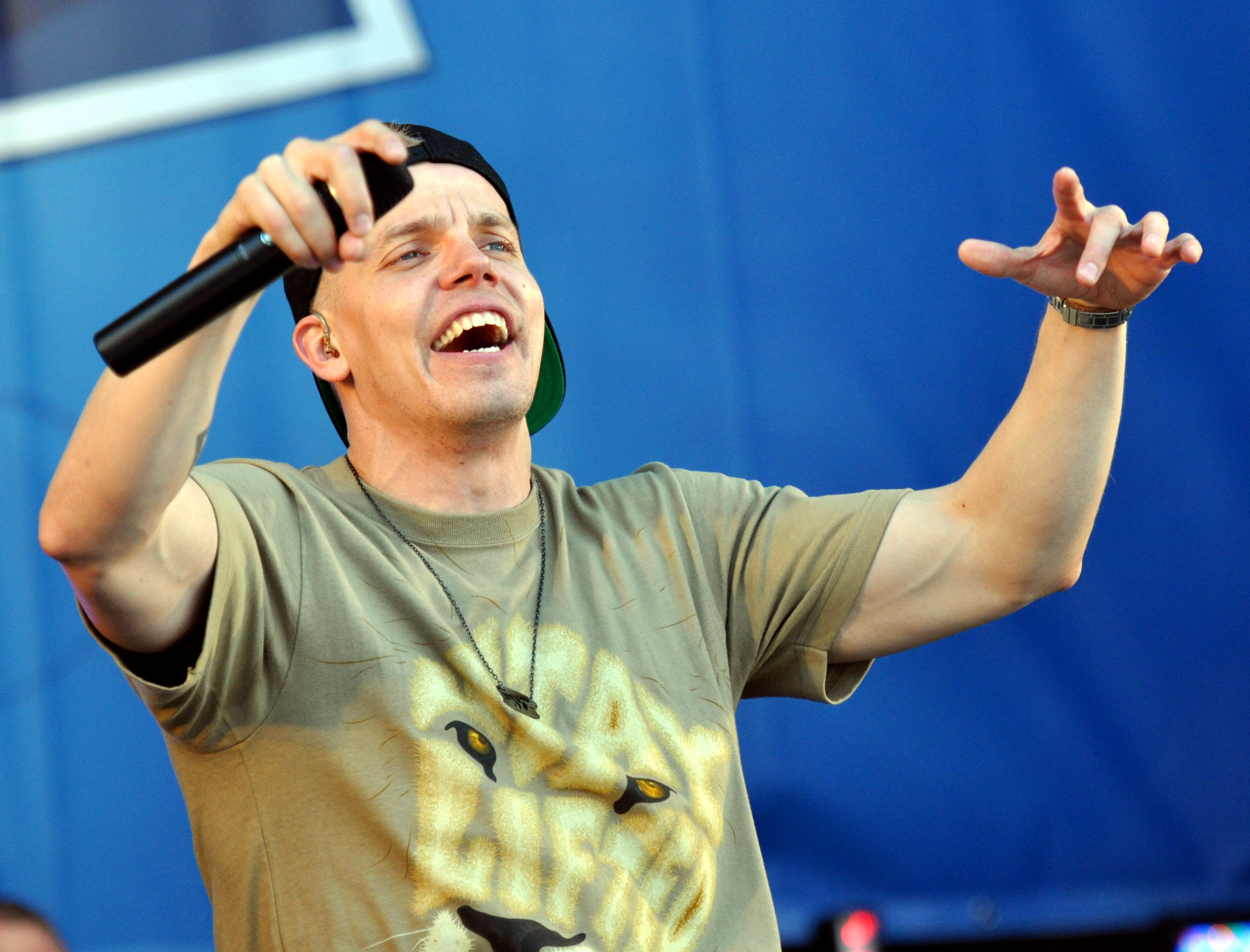

Background information
- Also known as: Ela, Koala Laiho
- Born: Kimmo Ilpo Juhani Laiho; Helsinki, Finland
- Genre: Hip hop
- Occupations: Rapper; record producer; entrepreneur
- Years active: 1997–present
- Label: Rähinä Records
- Member of: Fintelligens
- Website: www.elastinen.com

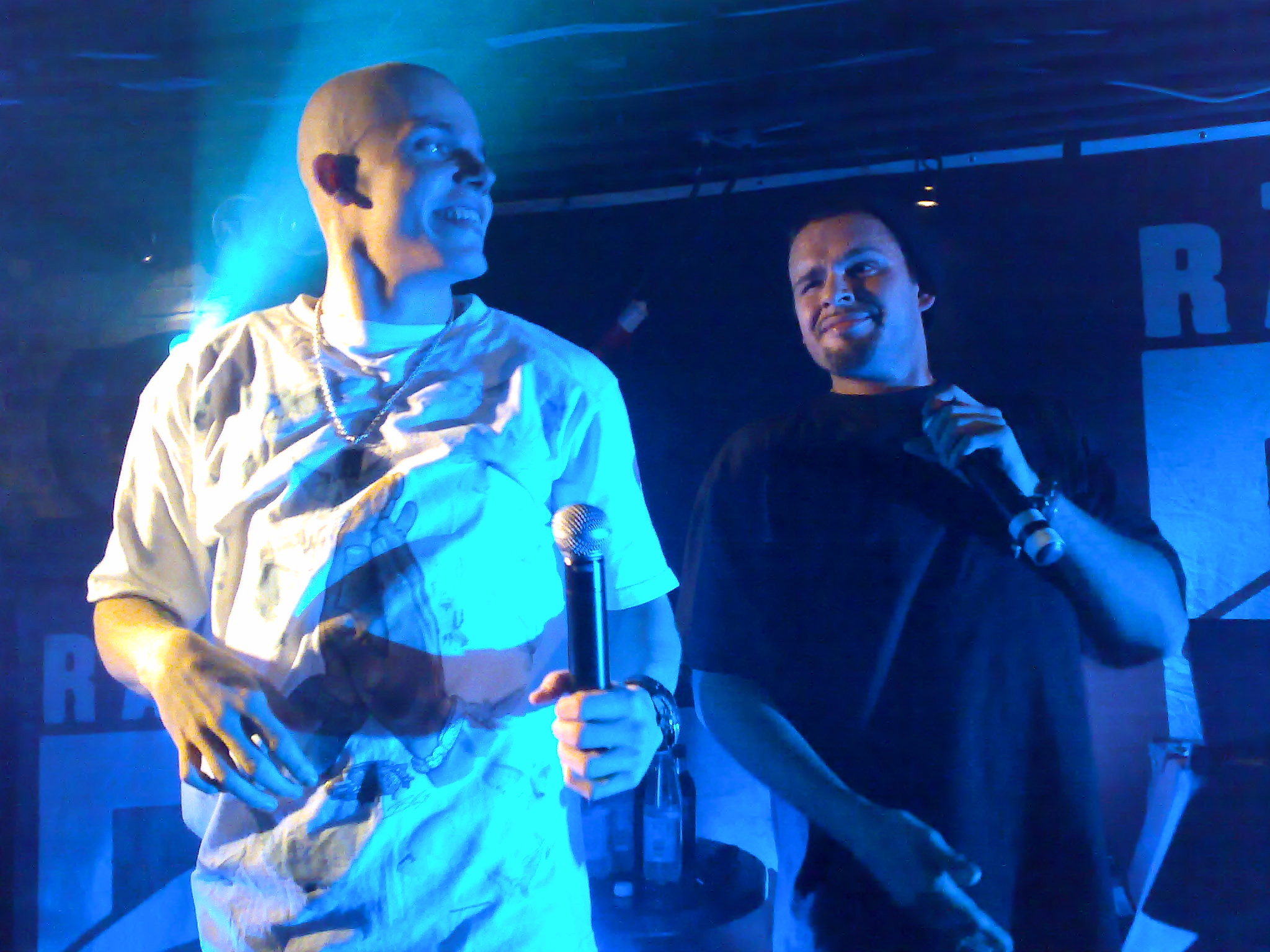
Elastinen and Timo Pieni Huijaus in 2007

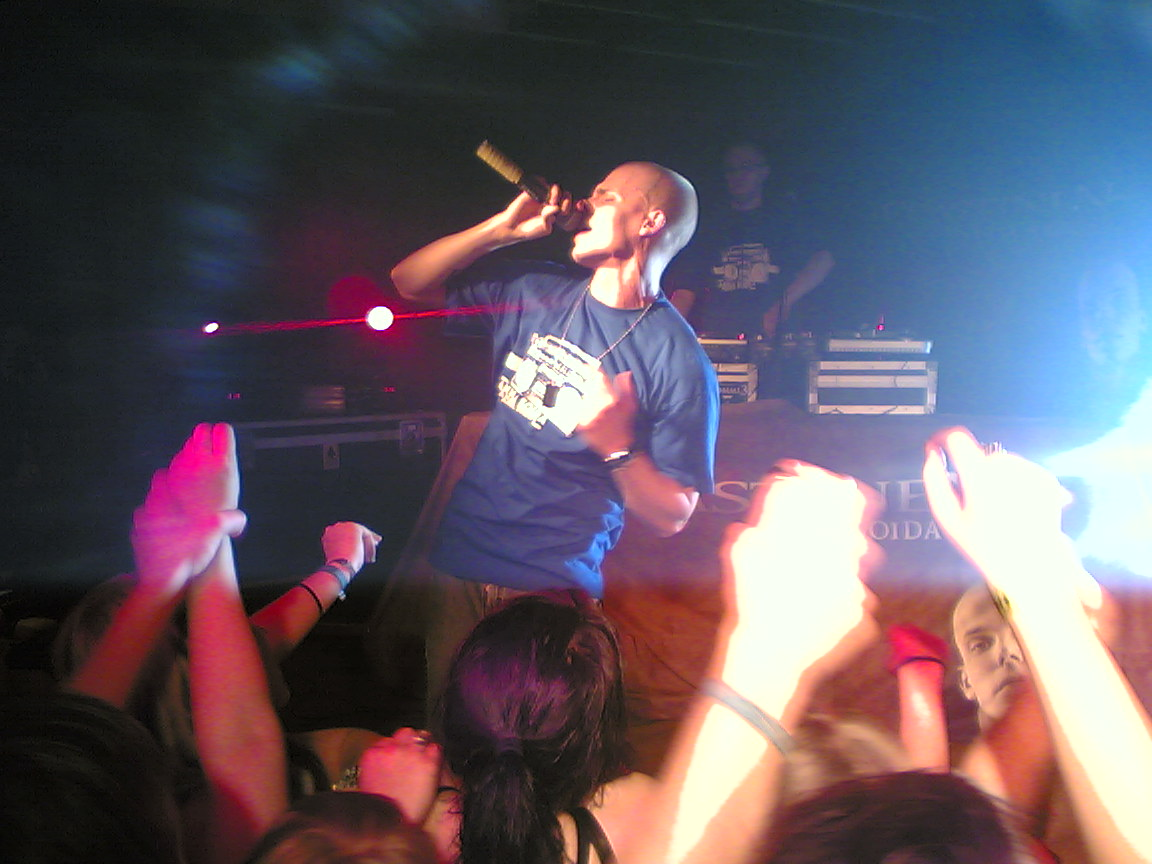
Elastinen at Cotton Club in 2006

Kimmo Ilpo Juhani Laiho (born 1981), better known by his stage name Elastinen (elastic in Finnish), is a Finnish rapper and also one of the founders and CEO of independent Finnish rap label Rähinä Records. Together with his colleague Iso H (Big H), he founded the Finnish rap duo Fintelligens. He has released five solo albums.

== Biography ==
=== Beginnings ===
Born and raised in Helsinki, Elastinen began taking guitar lessons when he was seven years old. At the age of 11 he started dancing and has been a member of famous break-dance groups as IMC and Savage Feet. Inspired by a hiphop-cassette, given by his elder-brother, "Ela" wrote his first rap-lyrics when he was 15 years old, after being inspired by a hip hop cassette given to him by his older brother. He joined an anti-racist musical "Colorblind" and met Iso H.

=== In Fintelligens ===
In summer 1997, Elastinen and Iso H founded Fintelligens. Elastinen was only 18 when they received their first record-deal.

Ela graduated from Sibelius Academy, a music school in 2000. Fintelligens released their debut album "Renesanssi" in the same year, with one-third of it being produced by Elastinen. Renesanssi certified gold. In autumn 2001, Elastinen and Iso H released their second album, Tän Tahtiin. Also partly produced by him, it was in its turned certified gold.

In 2002, Elastinen was called for military service at Santahamina. During his free time he performed shows with Iso H. Fintelligens released their third studio album in November. Kokemusten Summa went gold. The album was entirely produced by Elastinen.

=== Solo career ===
In 2004 Elastinen released his solo debut "Elaksis Kivi". In 2006 he finished his second album Anna Soida. The first single, the album's title track, was a hit. "Anna a" was released in 2006. His third album, E.L.A., was released in November 2007. First single from the album, "Ovet Paukkuu", was No. 1 on NRJ-Finland and had heavy rotation also on Finnish MTV and The Voice. He followed this with Joka päivä koko päivä in 2013, which peaked at number 4, and Elastinen feat. in 2016, which debuted at number 1. Elastinen feat. was preceded by a TV series featuring Elastinen collaborating with a different musician each episode.

== Discography ==
(For Elastinen discography with his band / duo Fintelligens, see Fintelligens)

=== Albums ===
Year	Album	Peak positions	Certification
Year	Album	FIN	Certification
2004	Elaksis Kivi	8	
2006	Anna soida	11	
2007	E.L.A.	10	
2013	Joka päivä koko päivä	4	
2016	Elastinen Feat.	1	
2017	Kävi täällä (with Cheek as Profeetat)	6	
2024	EK2	2	

=== Singles ===
Year	Title	Peak positions	Album
Year	Title	FIN	Album
2004	"Syljen"	17	Elaksis Kivi
2004	"Bäkkiin Stadiin"	–	Elaksis Kivi
2005	"Jeppiskamaa" (Rähinä – Elastinen & Uniikki)	8	Non-album single
2006	"Anna soida"	2	Anna soida
2007	"Päivä kerrallaan"	9	Anna soida
2007	"Ovet paukkuu"	9	E.L.A.
2007	"Häivytään"	–	E.L.A.
2013	"Iisii"	–	Joka päivä koko päivä
2013	"Loppuviikko" (feat. Uniikki, Timo Pieni Huijaus, Tasis & Spekti)	12	Joka päivä koko päivä
2015	"Eteen ja ylös"	2	Non-album single
2016	"Lempo" (feat. Lauri Tähkä)	1	Elastinen Feat.
2016	"Oota Mua" (feat. Johanna Kurkela)	2	Elastinen Feat.
2016	"Täytyy Jaksaa" (feat. Sami Hedberg)	1	Elastinen Feat.
2016	"Sinuhe" (with Cheek as Profeetat)	1	Non-album singles
2017	"Yhtäccii" (with Cheek as Profeetat)	3	Non-album singles
2017	"Jokainen kyynel" (with Cheek as Profeetat)	4	Non-album singles
2017	"Eyo" (with Cheek as Profeetat featuring Nelli Matula)	1	Non-album singles
2017	"Pipefest" (with Cheek as Profeetat featuring Paleface)	8	Non-album singles
2018	"Supervoimii"	2	Non-album singles
2018	"Loppuun asti"	1	Non-album singles
2019	"Sua seuraa aurinko"	12	Non-album singles
2019	"Keinutaan"	5	Vain elämää kausi 10
2019	"Morsian"	9	Vain elämää kausi 10
2019	"Pilasit mun elämän (Forever Yours)"	3	Vain elämää kausi 10
2019	"Tip Tap"	7	Vain elämää joulu
2020	"Epäröimättä hetkeekään" (with Jenni Vartiainen)	1	TBA
2021	"West Side Baby" (with Ibe and Blacflaco)	4	Non-album singles
2022	"Hetken tässä kaikes on järkee" (featuring Johanna Kurkela)	8	Non-album singles
2023	"Tänään lähden"	37	Non-album singles
2023	"Pimee" (featuring Bess)	8	Non-album singles
2023	"Aaltoi päin" (featuring Jami Faltin)	7	Non-album singles
2023	"Toiset samanlaiset" (featuring Käärijä)	7	Non-album singles
2024	"Pääs kii"	7	EK2
2025	"Jos tää ei oo se"	19	Non-album singles
2026	"Uskomaton" (featuring Sara Bee)	2	Non-album singles
2026	"Kovat ajat" (featuring Sliki)	23	Non-album singles
2026	"Family Guy" (with Jami Faltin)	47	Non-album singles

Other songs

Year	Single	Peak positions	Album
Year	Single	FIN	Album
2014	"Naurava Kulkuri"	1	Vain Elämää, Season 3, Vesa-Matti Loiri Day
2014	"Peggy"	2	Vain Elämää, Season 3, Samuli Edelmann Day
2014	"Oo siellä jossain mun"	3	Vain Elämää, Season 3, Paula Vesala Day
2014	"Minä ja hän"	12	Vain Elämää, Season 3, Jenni Vartiainen Day
2014	"Kun kuuntelen Tomppaa (kuuntelen Paulaa)"	13	Vain Elämää, Season 3, Paula Koivuniemi Day
2014	"Mitä kuuluu"	20	Vain Elämää, Season 3, Toni Wirtanen Day
2024	"Milt se tuntuu"	48	EK2

Featured in

Year	Single	Peak positions	Album
Year	Single	FIN	Album
2002	"Pelkkää viihdettä" (Rockin Da North feat. Elastinen, Yor123, Jurassikki, Flegmaatikot, Ezkimo, Paleface, Skandaali)	2	
2008	"Laatuaikaa" (XL5 feat. Elastinen)	13	
2008	"You Got the Light" (Beats and Styles feat. Elastinen)	14	
2010	"Pojat on poikii" (Uniikki feat. Elastinen & Spekti)	10	
2012	"Jos mä oisin sun mies" (Jontte Valosaari feat. Elastinen)	2	
