= Jenni Vartiainen discography =

Discography of Finnish pop singer

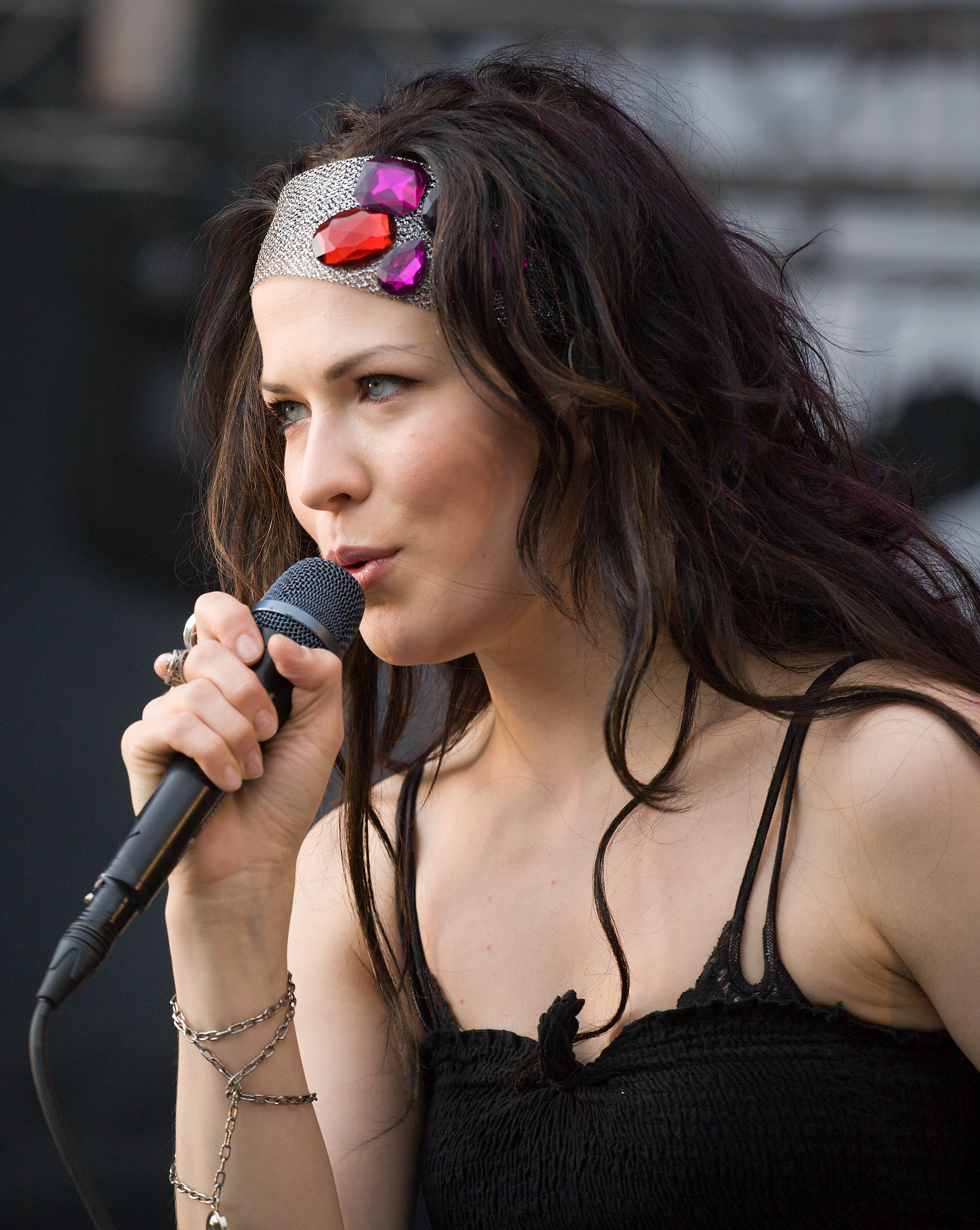
- Jenni Vartiainen in 2008
- Studio albums: 5
- Singles: 6
- Music videos: 10
- Promotional singles: 7

The discography of Jenni Vartiainen, a Finnish pop singer, consists of five studio albums, six singles, seven promotional singles and 10 music videos. According to Musiikkituottajat, she has sold over 330,000 records in Finland.

== Studio albums ==
Title	Album details	Peak chart positions	Sales	Certifications
Title	Album details	FIN	Sales	Certifications
Ihmisten edessä	Released: 12 September 2007; Label: Warner Music Finland; Formats: CD, digital download	6	FIN: 65,628	FIN: 2× Platinum
Seili	Released: 31 March 2010; Label: Warner Music Finland; Formats: CD, digital download, LP	1	FIN: 151,833	FIN: 3× Platinum
Terra	Released: 4 October 2013; Label: Warner Music Finland; Formats:	1	FIN: 62,777	FIN: 2× Platinum
Monologi	Released: 7 September 2018; Label: Warner Music Finland; Format: Digital download, streaming	1		
Origo	Released: 21 March 2025; Label: Warner Music Finland; Format: Digital download, streaming	1		

== Compilation albums ==
Title	Album details	Peak chart positions
Title	Album details	FIN
Ihmisten edessä 2007–2019	Released: 1 November 2019; Label: Warner Music Finland; Formats: CD, digital download, streaming	6

== Singles ==
Title	Year	Peak chart positions			Certifications	Album
Title	Year	FIN	FIN Download	FIN Airplay	Certifications	Album
"Tunnoton"	2007	—	22	—		Ihmisten edessä
"Ihmisten edessä"	2007	2	1	—	FIN: Platinum	Ihmisten edessä
"En haluu kuolla tänä yönä"	2010	1	1	—	FIN: Platinum	Seili
"Nettiin"	2010	12	12	—		Seili
"Missä muruseni on"	2010	1	1	85	FIN: Platinum	Seili
"Junat ja naiset"	2013	15	2	53		Terra
"Eden"	2014	15	—	—		
"Turvasana"	2017	4	—	—		
"Se oikea"	2017	8	—	—		
"Keinu"	2017	2	—	—		Vain elämää kausi 7
"Trampoliini"	2017	19	—	—		Vain elämää kausi 7
"Väärään suuntaan"	2018	4	—	—		Monologi
"Voulez-Vous"	2018	12	—	—		Monologi
"Made in Heaven"	2018	3	—	—		Monologi
"Epäröimättä hetkeekään" (with Elastinen)	2020	1	—	—		Non-album single
"Lanka"	2023	6	—	—		Origo
"Villit vedet"	2024	25	—	—		Origo
"Viimeinen pisara" (featuring Etta)	2024	8	—	—		Origo
"Valitsen sut uudestaan"	2024	36	—	—		Origo
"Leima" (with Turisti)	2025	2	—	—		Origo
"Joku johon nojata"	2026	23	—	—		TBA
"—" denotes releases that did not chart.

=== Promotional singles ===
Title	Year	Peak chart positions			Certifications	Album
Title	Year	FIN	FIN Download	FIN Airplay	Certifications	Album
"Toinen"	2007	13	10	—		Ihmisten edessä
"Mustaa kahvia"	2008	—	21	—		Ihmisten edessä
"Malja"	2008	—	—	—		Ihmisten edessä
"Duran Duran"	2010	10	10	83	FIN: Gold	Seili
"Eikö kukaan voi meitä pelastaa?"	2011	—	—	—		Seili
"Selvästi päihtynyt"	2013	—	23	1		Terra
"Suru on kunniavieras"	2014	—	3	1		Terra
"—" denotes releases that did not chart.

== Other charted songs ==
Title	Year	Peak chart positions		Album
Title	Year	FIN	FIN Download	Album
"Minä ja hän"	2012	8	8	Seili
"Minä sinua vaan"	2013	—	14	Terra
"Muistan kirkkauden"	2013	—	28	Terra
"—" denotes releases that did not chart.

== Featured songs ==
Title	Year	Album
"Kuuntele itseäs" (Pikku G featuring Jenni Vartiainen)	2004	Suora lähetys
"Kahdestaan" (Antti Tuisku featuring Jenni Vartiainen)	2004	Ensimmäinen – Deluxe

== Other appearances ==
Title	Year	Album
"Herra kädelläsi"	2005	Tilkkutäkki
"Martin Luther Kingin laulu"	2006	Tilkkutäkki vol 2.
"Olet valveilla"	2007	Tilkkutäkki 3
"Kulkuri ja joutsen"	2008	Mestaria kunnioittaen – tribuutti Tapio Rautavaaralle and Mestaria kunnioittaen – tribuutti Tapio Rautavaaralle – lisäksi Tapsan unohtumattomat tulkinnat
"Urho Kepponen"	2011	Ipanapa 2

== Music videos ==
Year	Title	Director(s)
2007	"Tunnoton"	Dome Karukoski
2007	"Ihmisten edessä"	
2008	"Malja"	
2010	"En haluu kuolla tänä yönä"	Miikka Lommi
2010	"Nettiin"	Misko Iho
2010	"Missä muruseni on"	Mikko Harma
2011	"Eikö kukaan voi meitä pelastaa?"	
2013	"Junat ja naiset"	
2013	"Selvästi päihtynyt"	
2014	"Suru on kunniavieras"	
