= List of number-one albums of 2011 (Finland) =

This is the complete list of (physical and digital) number-one albums sold in Finland in 2011 according to the Official Finnish Charts composed by Musiikkituottajat – IFPI Finland.

The best-performing album in 2011 in the Finnish charts was Leijonat 2011 – Virallinen Leijonat-kokoelma, the official compilation album by various artists celebrating Finland's victory at the 2011 IIHF World Championship, spending 8 weeks on the top spot. The second-best chart performer was Finnish singer-songwriter Chisu with her third studio album Kun valaistun spending 5 weeks atop the chart. The third-best chart performer was the posthumous Laulaja 1945–2010 by Finnish Kari Tapio (with four weeks atop the chart).

The top-ten list of the best-selling 2011 albums in Finland was the following:

	Album	Artist(s)	Sales	Reference(s)
1	Laulaja 1945–2010	Kari Tapio	41,903	
2	Seili	Jenni Vartiainen	29,499	
3	30 Golden Greats	Hurriganes	25,486	
4	Leijonat 2011 – Virallinen Leijonat-kokoelma	various artists	24,998	
5	Born This Way	Lady Gaga	19,854	
6	Suuri sydän	Laura Närhi	18,328	
7	Kotiteollisuus	Kotiteollisuus	17,399	
8	Out of Style	Sunrise Avenue	16,602	
9	Wasting Light	Foo Fighters	16,510	
10	Munamiehen maailma	Munamies	14,556	

== Chart history ==
Physical & digital albums
Week	Album	Artist(s)	Reference(s)
Week 1	Seili	Jenni Vartiainen	
Week 2	Seili	Jenni Vartiainen	
Week 3	Elysium	Stratovarius	
Week 4	Seili	Jenni Vartiainen	
Week 5	Laulaja 1945–2010	Kari Tapio	
Week 6	Laulaja 1945–2010	Kari Tapio	
Week 7	Laulaja 1945–2010	Kari Tapio	
Week 8	Kaikki tai ei mitään	Petri Nygård	
Week 9	Laulaja 1945–2010	Kari Tapio	
Week 10	Kotiteollisuus	Kotiteollisuus	
Week 11	Relentless Reckless Forever	Children of Bodom	
Week 12	Sensory Overdrive	Michael Monroe	
Week 13	Stars Aligned	Von Hertzen Brothers	
Week 14	Rush	Anna Abreu	
Week 15	Wasting Light	Foo Fighters	
Week 16	Wasting Light	Foo Fighters	
Week 17	Wasting Light	Foo Fighters	
Week 18	Mustaa kultaa	Jare & VilleGalle	
Week 19	Manner	Scandinavian Music Group	
Week 20	Mustaa kultaa	Jare & VilleGalle	
Week 21	Munamiehen maailma	Munamies	
Week 22	The Beginning of Times	Amorphis	
Week 23	Leijonat 2011 – Virallinen Leijonat-kokoelma	Various artists	
Week 24	Leijonat 2011 – Virallinen Leijonat-kokoelma	Various artists	
Week 25	Leijonat 2011 – Virallinen Leijonat-kokoelma	Various artists	
Week 26	Leijonat 2011 – Virallinen Leijonat-kokoelma	Various artists	
Week 27	Leijonat 2011 – Virallinen Leijonat-kokoelma	Various artists	
Week 28	Leijonat 2011 – Virallinen Leijonat-kokoelma	Various artists	
Week 29	Leijonat 2011 – Virallinen Leijonat-kokoelma	Various artists	
Week 30	Leijonat 2011 – Virallinen Leijonat-kokoelma	Various artists	
Week 31	Arttu Wiskari	Arttu Wiskari	
Week 32	Intiaanikesä vol. 3	Various artists	
Week 33	21	Adele	
Week 34	21	Adele	
Week 35	I'm with You	Red Hot Chili Peppers	
Week 36	I'm with You	Red Hot Chili Peppers	
Week 37	Loputon luokkaretki	Klamydia	
Week 38	A Dramatic Turn of Events	Dream Theater	
Week 39	Hyvä voittaa	Juha Tapio	
Week 40	Hyvä voittaa	Juha Tapio	
Week 41	Kun valaistun	Chisu	
Week 42	Kun valaistun	Chisu	
Week 43	Kun valaistun	Chisu	
Week 44	Tummansininen sävel	Topi Sorsakoski	
Week 45	Tummansininen sävel	Topi Sorsakoski	
Week 46	Tummansininen sävel	Topi Sorsakoski	
Week 47	Kun valaistun	Chisu	
Week 48	Mutala	Eppu Normaali	
Week 49	Imaginaerum	Nightwish	
Week 50	Imaginaerum	Nightwish	
Week 51	Imaginaerum	Nightwish	
Week 52	Kun valaistun	Chisu	

== See also ==
- List of number-one singles of 2011 (Finland)
