= List of number-one singles of 2011 (Finland) =

This is the complete list of (physical and digital) number-one singles sold in Finland in 2011 according to the Official Finnish Charts. The list on the left side of the box (Suomen virallinen singlelista, "the Official Finnish Singles Chart") represents both physical and digital track sales and the one on the right side (Suomen virallinen latauslista, "the Official Finnish Download Chart") represents sales of digital tracks.

== Chart history ==
Official Finnish Singles Chart				Official Finnish Download Chart			
Issue date	Song	Artist(s)	Ref	Issue date	Song	Artist(s)	Ref
Week 1 (January 4)	"Missä muruseni on"	Jenni Vartiainen		Week 1	"Missä muruseni on"	Jenni Vartiainen	
Week 2 (January 11)	"Missä muruseni on"	Jenni Vartiainen		Week 2	"Missä muruseni on"	Jenni Vartiainen	
Week 3 (January 18)	"Hold It Against Me"	Britney Spears		Week 3	"Hold It Against Me"	Britney Spears	
Week 4 (January 25)	"Selvä päivä"	Petri Nygård (feat. Lord Est)		Week 4	"Selvä päivä"	Petri Nygård (feat. Lord Est)	
Week 5 (February 1)	"Selvä päivä"	Petri Nygård (feat. Lord Est)		Week 5	"Selvä päivä"	Petri Nygård (feat. Lord Est)	
Week 6 (February 8)	"Selvä päivä"	Petri Nygård (feat. Lord Est)		Week 6	"Selvä päivä"	Petri Nygård (feat. Lord Est)	
Week 7 (February 15)	"Born This Way"	Lady Gaga		Week 7	"Born This Way"	Lady Gaga	
Week 8 (February 22)	"Born This Way"	Lady Gaga		Week 8	"Born This Way"	Lady Gaga	
Week 9 (March 1)	"On the Floor"	Jennifer Lopez (feat. Pitbull)		Week 9	"On the Floor"	Jennifer Lopez (feat. Pitbull)	
Week 10 (March 8)	"On the Floor"	Jennifer Lopez (feat. Pitbull)		Week 10	"On the Floor"	Jennifer Lopez (feat. Pitbull)	
Week 11 (March 15)	"On the Floor"	Jennifer Lopez (feat. Pitbull)		Week 11	"On the Floor"	Jennifer Lopez (feat. Pitbull)	
Week 12 (March 22)	"On the Floor"	Jennifer Lopez (feat. Pitbull)		Week 12	"On the Floor"	Jennifer Lopez (feat. Pitbull)	
Week 13 (March 29)	"On the Floor"	Jennifer Lopez (feat. Pitbull)		Week 13	"On the Floor"	Jennifer Lopez (feat. Pitbull)	
Week 14 (April 5)	"On the Floor"	Jennifer Lopez (feat. Pitbull)		Week 14	"On the Floor"	Jennifer Lopez (feat. Pitbull)	
Week 15 (April 12)	"On the Floor"	Jennifer Lopez (feat. Pitbull)		Week 15	"On the Floor"	Jennifer Lopez (feat. Pitbull)	
Week 16 (April 19)	"On the Floor"	Jennifer Lopez (feat. Pitbull)		Week 16	"On the Floor"	Jennifer Lopez (feat. Pitbull)	
Week 17 (April 26)	"Vääryyttä!!1!"	Apulanta		Week 17	"On the Floor"	Jennifer Lopez (feat. Pitbull)	
Week 18 (May 3)	"On the Floor"	Jennifer Lopez (feat. Pitbull)		Week 18	"On the Floor"	Jennifer Lopez (feat. Pitbull)	
Week 19 (May 10)	"Häissä"	Jare & VilleGalle		Week 19	"Häissä"	Jare & VilleGalle	
Week 20 (May 17)	"Poika (saunoo)"	Poju		Week 20	"Poika (saunoo)"	Poju	
Week 21 (May 24)	"Poika (saunoo)"	Poju		Week 21	"Poika (saunoo)"	Poju	
Week 22 (May 31)	"Poika (saunoo)"	Poju		Week 22	"Poika (saunoo)"	Poju	
Week 23 (June 7)	"Poika (saunoo)"	Poju		Week 23	"Poika (saunoo)"	Poju	
Week 24 (June 14)	"Poika (saunoo)"	Poju		Week 24	"Poika (saunoo)"	Poju	
Week 25 (June 21)	"Poika (saunoo)"	Poju		Week 25	"Poika (saunoo)"	Poju	
Week 26 (June 28)	"Poika (saunoo)"	Poju		Week 26	"Poika (saunoo)"	Poju	
Week 27 (July 5)	"Reggaerekka"	Lord Est (feat. Petri Nygård)		Week 27	"Reggaerekka"	Lord Est (feat. Petri Nygård)	
Week 28 (July 12)	"Reggaerekka"	Lord Est (feat. Petri Nygård)		Week 28	"Reggaerekka"	Lord Est (feat. Petri Nygård)	
Week 29 (July 19)	"Silkkii"	Jukka Poika		Week 29	"Silkkii"	Jukka Poika	
Week 30 (July 26)	"Silkkii"	Jukka Poika		Week 30	"Silkkii"	Jukka Poika	
Week 31 (August 2)	"Silkkii"	Jukka Poika		Week 31	"Silkkii"	Jukka Poika	
Week 32 (August 9)	"Silkkii"	Jukka Poika		Week 32	"Silkkii"	Jukka Poika	
Week 33 (August 16)	"Silkkii"	Jukka Poika		Week 33	"Silkkii"	Jukka Poika	
Week 34 (August 23)	"Silkkii"	Jukka Poika		Week 34	"Silkkii"	Jukka Poika	
Week 35 (August 30)	"Sabotage"	Chisu		Week 35	"Sabotage"	Chisu	
Week 36 (September 6)	"Moves Like Jagger"	Maroon 5 (feat. Christina Aguilera)		Week 36	"Moves Like Jagger"	Maroon 5 (feat. Christina Aguilera)	
Week 37 (September 13)	"Moves Like Jagger"	Maroon 5 (feat. Christina Aguilera)		Week 37	"Moves Like Jagger"	Maroon 5 (feat. Christina Aguilera)	
Week 38 (September 20)	"Moves Like Jagger"	Maroon 5 (feat. Christina Aguilera)		Week 38	"Moves Like Jagger"	Maroon 5 (feat. Christina Aguilera)	
Week 39 (September 27)	"Moves Like Jagger"	Maroon 5 (feat. Christina Aguilera)		Week 39	"Moves Like Jagger"	Maroon 5 (feat. Christina Aguilera)	
Week 40 (October 4)	"Moves Like Jagger"	Maroon 5 (feat. Christina Aguilera)		Week 40	"Moves Like Jagger"	Maroon 5 (feat. Christina Aguilera)	
Week 41 (October 11)	"Moves Like Jagger"	Maroon 5 (feat. Christina Aguilera)		Week 41	"Moves Like Jagger"	Maroon 5 (feat. Christina Aguilera)	
Week 42 (October 18)	"Sabotage"	Chisu		Week 42	"Sabotage"	Chisu	
Week 43 (October 25)	"We Found Love"	Rihanna (feat. Calvin Harris)		Week 43	"We Found Love"	Rihanna (feat. Calvin Harris)	
Week 44 (November 1)	"We Found Love"	Rihanna (feat. Calvin Harris)		Week 44	"We Found Love"	Rihanna (feat. Calvin Harris)	
Week 45 (November 8)	"Pihtiote"	Apulanta		Week 45	"We Found Love"	Rihanna (feat. Calvin Harris)	
Week 46 (November 15)	"Storytime"	Nightwish		Week 46	"Storytime"	Nightwish	
Week 47 (November 22)	"Storytime"	Nightwish		Week 47	"Storytime"	Nightwish	
Week 48 (November 29)	"Storytime"	Nightwish		Week 48	"Kohtalon oma"	Chisu	
Week 48 (November 29)	"Storytime"	Nightwish		Week 48	"We Found Love"	Rihanna (feat. Calvin Harris)	
Week 49 (December 6)	"Storytime"	Nightwish		Week 49	"We Found Love"	Rihanna (feat. Calvin Harris)	
Week 50 (December 13)	"We Found Love"	Rihanna (feat. Calvin Harris)		Week 50	"We Found Love"	Rihanna (feat. Calvin Harris)	
Week 51 (December 20)	"Kohtalon oma"	Chisu		Week 51	"Kohtalon oma"	Chisu	
Week 52 (December 27)	"Someone Like You"	Adele		Week 52	"Someone Like You"	Adele	

== See also ==
- List of number-one albums of 2011 (Finland)
