= List of number-one albums of 2010 (Finland) =

This is the complete list of (physical and digital) number-one albums sold in Finland in 2010 according to Finland's Official List composed by Suomen Ääni- ja kuvatallennetuottajat ÄKT (since late August 2010, known as Musiikkituottajat – IFPI Finland).

The best-performing artist was Finnish singer Jenni Vartiainen with her second studio album Seili, spending 12 weeks on the top spot. The second-best chart performer was Finnish singer Anna Puu with her second studio album Sahara spending 8 weeks atop the chart. Other major chart-toppers include Strike! by German The Baseballs, Kunnes joet muuttaa suuntaa by Finnish Maija Vilkkumaa and The Final Frontier by English Iron Maiden (all with three weeks atop the chart).

However, the top 10 list of the best-selling 2010 albums in Finland was the following:

	Album	Artist(s)	Sales	Reference(s)
1	Seili	Jenni Vartiainen	95,394	
2	Hirmuliskojen yö	Hevisaurus	36,106	
3	Iholla	Lauri Tähkä & Elonkerjuu	35,666	
4	Rakkaus päällemme sataa	Suvi Teräsniska	33,250	
5	Vapaa ja yksin	Chisu	30,309	
6	Sahara	Anna Puu	29,681	
7	Iron Man 2	AC/DC	25,022	
8	Pimeä onni	Jippu & Samuli Edelmann	24,207	
9	Strike!	The Baseballs	23,047	
10	The Final Frontier	Iron Maiden	22,510	

== Chart history ==
Issue date	Album	Artist(s)	Reference(s)
Week 1	Strike!	The Baseballs	
Week 2	Strike!	The Baseballs	
Week 3	Strike!	The Baseballs	
Week 4	Pojat ei tanssi	Herra Ylppö & Ihmiset	
Week 5	Suurenmoinen kokoelma 1999–2009	Juha Tapio	
Week 6	Suurenmoinen kokoelma 1999–2009	Juha Tapio	
Week 7	Viimeinen Atlantis	Stam1na	
Week 8	Viimeinen Atlantis	Stam1na	
Week 9	The Fame Monster	Lady Gaga	
Week 10	Singlet 2004–2009	Apulanta	
Week 11	Strike!	The Baseballs	
Week 12	Twilight Theater	Poets of the Fall	
Week 13	Sydänjuuret	Mokoma	
Week 14	Polkabilly Rebels	J. Karjalainen	
Week 15	Hyvästi, Dolores Haze	Johanna Kurkela	
Week 16	Seili	Jenni Vartiainen	
Week 17	Kunnes joet muuttaa suuntaa	Maija Vilkkumaa	
Week 18	Kunnes joet muuttaa suuntaa	Maija Vilkkumaa	
Week 19	Vieras paratiisissa	Kari Tapio	
Week 20	Kunnes joet muuttaa suuntaa	Maija Vilkkumaa	
Week 21	Musta	Pate Mustajärvi	
Week 22	Sahara	Anna Puu	
Week 23	Sahara	Anna Puu	
Week 24	Sahara	Anna Puu	
Week 25	Sahara	Anna Puu	
Week 26	Sahara	Anna Puu	
Week 27	En plats i solen	Kent	
Week 28	Sahara	Anna Puu	
Week 29	Sahara	Anna Puu	
Week 30	Sahara	Anna Puu	
Week 31	Nightmare	Avenged Sevenfold	
Week 32	Vapaa ja yksin	Chisu	
Week 33	The Final Frontier	Iron Maiden	
Week 34	The Final Frontier	Iron Maiden	
Week 35	The Final Frontier	Iron Maiden	
Week 36	Maapallo	Raappana	
Week 37	Maailma on kaunis	Olli Lindholm	
Week 38	Beyond Hell/Above Heaven	Volbeat	
Week 39	JHT2	Cheek	
Week 40	Iäti	CMX	
Week 41	Seili	Jenni Vartiainen	
Week 42	Puolimieli	Happoradio	
Week 43	Seili	Jenni Vartiainen	
Week 44	Seili	Jenni Vartiainen	
Week 45	Seili	Jenni Vartiainen	
Week 46	Seili	Jenni Vartiainen	
Week 47	Seili	Jenni Vartiainen	
Week 48	Seili	Jenni Vartiainen	
Week 49	Seili	Jenni Vartiainen	
Week 50	Seili	Jenni Vartiainen	
Week 51	Seili	Jenni Vartiainen	
Week 52	Seili	Jenni Vartiainen	

== See also ==
- List of number-one singles of 2010 (Finland)
