= Seili =

Seili may refer to:

- Själö, an island known as Seili in Finnish
- Seili, a 2010 album by Jenni Vartiainen

- "Seili", a song of the album
