= En haluu kuolla tänä yönä =

Single by Jenni Vartiainen

from the album Seili
- Released: 1 February 2010
- Recorded: 2009–2010
- Genre: Electropop
- Length: 3:45
- Label: Warner Music Finland
- Songwriters: Mariska (lyrics); Jenni Vartiainen, Jukka Immonen (composers)

Jenni Vartiainen singles chronology
"Ihmisten edessä" (2007)	"En haluu kuolla tänä yönä" (2010)	"Nettiin" (2010)

"En haluu kuolla tänä yönä" (English: I Don't Wanna Die Tonight) is a Finnish-language song by Finnish pop singer Jenni Vartiainen. It was released on 1 February 2010 by Warner Music Finland as the lead single from her second studio album Seili. The lyrics are written by Finnish rapper Mariska and composed by Vartiainen and Jukka Immonen. "En haluu kuolla tänä yönä" received the 2010 Emma Award for the Song of the Year and it was the most-played song on commercial Finnish radio stations in 2010 with over 5,200 plays.

== Chart performance ==
In February 2010, "En haluu kuolla tänä yönä" debuted at number 11 on the Finnish Singles Chart and jumped to number one the next week. The song charted for a total of 21 weeks. Selling platinum with over 11,000 copies in Finland to date, "En haluu kuolla tänä yönä" was the sixth-best-selling single of 2010.

== Track listing ==
No.	Title	Length
1.	"En haluu kuolla tänä yönä" (I Don't Wanna Die Tonight)	3:45

== Charts and certifications ==
=== Weekly charts ===
Chart (2010)	Peak position
Finland (Suomen virallinen lista)	1

=== Year-end charts ===
Chart (2010)	Position
Finland (Suomen virallinen lista)	6

=== Certifications ===
Region	Certification	Certified units/sales
Finland (Musiikkituottajat)	Platinum	11,914

== See also ==
- List of number-one singles of 2010 (Finland)
