= Mustaa kahvia =

Promotional single by Jenni Vartiainen

from the album Ihmisten edessä
- Released: March 17, 2008
- Recorded: 2007
- Genre: Pop
- Length: 3:45
- Label: Warner Music Finland
- Songwriter: Kyösti Salokorpi

"Mustaa kahvia" (English: Black Coffee) is a Finnish-language song by Finnish singer Jenni Vartiainen, released as the second promotional single from her debut album Ihmisten edessä on March 17, 2008, by Warner Music Finland. The release included the song, written by Kyösti Salokorpi, its remix and remixes of two other songs, "Toinen" and "Ihmisten edessä".

== Track listing ==
No.	Title	Length
1.	"Mustaa kahvia" (Black Coffee)	3:45
2.	"Mustaa kahvia (Phonky Asses Club edit)"	4:57
3.	"Ihmisten edessä (FBOTI's 2 AM Remix)" (In Front of People)	5:16
4.	"Toinen (FBOTI's Third Wheel Remix)" (Another One)	7:39

== Charts ==
Chart (2008)	Peak position
Finland Download (Latauslista)	21
