= Made in Heaven (disambiguation) =

Made in Heaven is a 1995 album by Queen.

Made in Heaven may also refer to:

== Film and television ==
- Made in Heaven (1921 film), an American silent film by Victor Schertzinger
- Made in Heaven (1952 film), a British comedy by John Paddy Carstairs
- Made in Heaven (1987 film), an American romantic comedy by Alan Rudolph
- Made in Heaven (TV series), a 2019 Indian web series
- "Made in Heaven" (Playhouse 90), a 1956 American television play

== Music ==
- "Made in Heaven" (song), by Freddie Mercury, 1985; also covered by Queen (1995)
- "Made in Heaven", a song by Jenni Vartiainen, 2018
- "Made in Heaven", a song by Kylie Minogue, the B-side of "Turn It into Love", 1988
- "Made in Heaven", a song by Nik Kershaw from 15 Minutes, 1999
- Made in Heaven, a 1996 video by Queen
- Made in Heaven, a 2005 documentary about the 1959 Miles Davis album Kind of Blue

== Other media ==
- Made in Heaven (Jeff Koons), a 1990–1991 multimedia art series by Jeff Koons
- Made in Heaven (manga), a 2007 manga by Ami Sakurai
- Made in Heaven, a Stand (supernatural entity) in the sixth story arc of the Japanese manga series JoJo's Bizarre Adventure, titled Stone Ocean
