= Duran Duran (disambiguation) =

Duran Duran is an English pop rock band.

Duran Duran may also refer to:

Works by Duran Duran

- Duran Duran (1981 album)
- Duran Duran (1993 album), also known as The Wedding Album
- Duran Duran (1983 video)

Other uses

- Durand Durand, a fictional character, after whom the band is named, from the 1968 film Barbarella
- "Duran Duran" (song), a song by Jenni Vartiainen
