= Krogerus (surname) =

Krogerus is a surname. Notable people with the surname include:

- Anna Krogerus (born 1974), Finnish playwright who was awarded the Artist of the Year diploma by Kuopio Senior High of Music and Dance
- Eija Krogerus (1932–2018), Finnish bowler
