= Missä muruseni on =

Single by Jenni Vartiainen

from the album Seili
- Released: 23 August 2010
- Recorded: 2009–2010
- Genre: Pop
- Length: 3:42
- Label: Warner Music Finland
- Songwriter: Mariska

Jenni Vartiainen singles chronology
"Nettiin" (2010)	"Missä muruseni on" (2010)	"Junat ja naiset" (2013)

Music video
- "Missä muruseni on" on YouTube

Missä muruseni on (English: Where My Sweetheart Is) is a Finnish-language song by Finnish pop singer Jenni Vartiainen. It was released in Finland as the third single from her second studio album Seili on 23 August 2010 by Warner Music Finland.

== Chart performance ==
Missä muruseni on debuted at number three on the Finnish Singles Chart on the week 35 of 2010 and peaked at number one on its fourth week. The single remained atop the chart for a total of 11 weeks in three runs (weeks 38, 40–46 and 52 in 2010; weeks 1 and 2 in 2011) and 15 weeks atop the Official Finnish Download Chart in 2010 and 2011. With over 18,000 copies sold in Finland to date, "Missä muruseni on" was the eighth best-selling single of 2010, the third best-selling of 2011 and currently ranks 59th among the best-selling singles of all time in the country.

== Music video ==
Written by Finnish rapper Mariska, the lyrics talk about the singer being far away from her loved one and how she asks the wind to blow there "where my sweetheart is" (directly in Finnish "missä muruseni on") — in order for her to be in touch with her loved one through the wind. The music video for the song was directed by Mikko Harman and made available on 27 October 2010. The video begins with the singer walking on a suspension bridge. Then the scene moves on quickly indoors with lyrics beginning while the singer is lying on the attic floor and singing about how she went upstairs to sleep "to be closer to the wind" and how she hopes the wind will blow soon. Then the chorus begins with the singer being seen by a window. The next verse begins and Vartiainen is seen standing and lying on a rocky beach looking towards the sea with an expression of longing on her face. Then the singer sings the chorus twice while the sky becomes cloudy and she sings more passionately standing on the beach. The scene is interspersed with quick shots of Vartiainen standing on the suspension bridge. The video ends with a clearing sky and the singer sitting on the ground, looking into a puddle on the beach. In February 2011, Jenni Vartiainen won the Emma Award for Music Video of the Year with "Missä muruseni on".

In December 2011, two Sami women from Finnish Lapland, Suvi West and Anne Kirste Aikio, released a Sami-language parody video of the song, as a teaser to their TV series Märät säpikkäät, which will present the modern Sami culture in contrast to Finnish-speaking Finland and is scheduled to air on YLE TV2 in January 2012.

== Charts and certifications ==
=== Weekly charts ===
Chart (2010)	Peak position
Finland (Suomen virallinen lista)	1

=== Year-end charts ===
Chart (2010)	Position
Finland (Suomen virallinen lista)	8
Chart (2011)	Position
Finland (Suomen virallinen lista)	3

=== Certifications ===
Region	Certification	Certified units/sales
Finland (Musiikkituottajat)	Platinum	18,192

== See also ==
- List of best-selling singles in Finland
- List of number-one singles of 2010 (Finland)
- List of number-one singles of 2011 (Finland)
