= Ihmisten edessä =

Studio album by Jenni Vartiainen
- Released: 5 September 2007 (digital); 12 September 2007 (CD)
- Recorded: 2007
- Genre: Pop, rock, blues, folk, country
- Length: 41:22
- Language: Finnish
- Label: WEA, Warner Music Finland
- Producer: Jukka Immonen

Jenni Vartiainen chronology
Ihmisten edessä (2007)	Seili (2010)

Singles from Ihmisten edessä
- 1. "Tunnoton" Released: 11 April 2007; 2. "Ihmisten edessä" Released: 5 September 2007

Ihmisten edessä (English: In Front of People) is the debut studio album by Finnish pop singer, Jenni Vartiainen. The Finnish-language album was released digitally on 5 September 2007, with the physical release following on 12 September. The album was produced by Jukka Immonen. Well received by music critics who complimented the album for nuanced vocals, interpretation and mixing of several musical styles such as electro and funk, the album debuted at number eight on the Finnish Albums Chart. It peaked at number six in mid-April 2008 and charted for 35 weeks. To date, the album has sold over 65,000 copies in Finland.

== Critical reception ==
Professional ratings
Review scores
Source	Rating
Helsingin Sanomat	4/5 stars
Keskisuomalainen	4/5 stars
Stara	5/5 stars

Ihmisten edessä was well received by music critics, as most of the reviewers complimented the audacious use of musical elements and styles and Vartiainen's nuanced vocals and interpretation. The critics also noted Vartiainen's stylistic departure from her previous pop band Gimmel. Writing for Helsingin Sanomat, Ilkka Mattila gave Ihmisten edessä four out of five stars, saying the debut album was a "precedent" in the Finnish pop of the 2000s as it showed how Vartiainen "seriously tries to get rid of a talent show star's role". Mattila considered "Tunnoton" with its "captivating banjo and folk ambience" one of the best Finnish pop songs of the year and "Ihmisten edessä" "British-spirited, melancholic gay disco with all the hooks". Helsingin Sanomat praised Vartiainen's intimate interpretation as the core of the music. Noting a little R&B-esque singing popular on talent shows, Mattila went on to say the record is "commercial though ambitious and, therefore, pleasurable pop". Mattila credited producer and composer Jukka Immonen for "fearlessly using unfashionable special effects such as Soul II Soul-like comping and synthetic choirs". Kirsi Taivainen from Keskisuomalainen gave the album four out of five stars alike, saying the album is "balanced, hued, poppish music" that is "not too calculated for being genuine". Noting old synthpop sounds and tiny musical elements, she considered the "finely-mixed album strongly contemporary". Giving credits to the bass and drums synchronizing the songs with a back rhythm, Taivainen complimented Vartiainen's "developed vocals with a range of delicate nuances" for "not being mainstream".

The pop rock magazine Stara went further by considering the album worth five out of five stars. The magazine denounced the opening act "Tuhannet mun kasvot" as "a cacophonous, lousy fiddle", though it thanked "Ihmisten edessä", the following, "extremely beautiful piano track", for "saving the mood". Stara considered "Kerro miltä se tuntuu" as well as "Toinen" evocative of a couple of international lounge hits. The magazine pointed out the "surprising" banjo hook of "Tunnoton" and considered "Malja" an "entertaining, eccentric mix of electronic music and pop from late 1970s and early 1980s". The magazine believed "Mustaa kahvia" could have some potential to become a hit due to its "tough funk beat and electro influences". Stara highlighted the "groovy and catchy" "Elämänperhonen" with its "beautifully catchy synth-violin solo" and the "overly elegant" "Mandartania" with its "Massive Attack-style jingle" as the best tracks of the album. In conclusion, Stara complimented Jukka Immonen, with his "ear for sounds", for creating "an exceptionally elegant Finnish album" which is "world-class by all its components"—excepting the first track.

== Chart performance ==
Ihmisten edessä entered the Finnish Albums Chart at number eight. The album went down the chart towards the end of 2007, reaching its lowest position, number 37, in the week 47. After that, Ihmisten edessä started to climb up the chart, reaching its peak position, number six, in April 2008 (week 15). Altogether, the album charted for 35 weeks and sold over 26,000 copies in 2008, becoming 14th-best-selling album of 2008 in Finland. To date, Ihmisten edessä has sold double-platinum with over 65,000 copies.

== Singles ==
The lead single of Ihmisten edessä, "Tunnoton", was released on 11 April 2007. It failed to chart on the Finnish Singles Chart, though it charted for three weeks on the Official Finnish Download Chart, peaking at number 22. The second single "Ihmisten edessä", released on 5 September 2007, debuted at number 20 on the Singles Chart and peaked at number two on its fourth week in mid-October. It charted for 32 weeks altogether and gold with over 14,000 copies. The single peaked at number one on the Download Chart and charted there for 44 weeks altogether. The first promotional single "Toinen", released on 3 December 2007, charted for seven weeks on the Singles Chart, peaking at number 13, and for 11 weeks on the Download Chart, reaching number 10. The second promotional single "Mustaa kahvia", released on 17 March 2008, failed to chart on the Singles Chart, though it charted for three weeks on the Download Chart, peaking at number 21.

== Track listing ==
- Digital download

No.	Title	Lyrics	Composer	Length
1.	"Tuhannet mun kasvot" (My One Thousand Faces)	Mariska	Jukka Immonen, Jenni Vartiainen	5:06
2.	"Ihmisten edessä" (In Front of People)	Teemu Brunila	Brunila	3:32
3.	"Kerro miltä se tuntuu" (Tell [Me] What It Feels Like)	Inka Nousiainen	Immonen, Vartiainen	4:01
4.	"Toinen" (Another One)	Aura-S Y.	Immonen, Vartiainen	4:08
5.	"Mustaa kahvia" (Black Coffee)	Kyösti Salokorpi	Salokorpi	3:44
6.	"Malja" (Toast)	Mariska	Immonen, Vartiainen	3:21
7.	"Tunnoton" (Numb)	Juhani Lappalainen	A. "Knipi" Stierncreutz	4:16
8.	"Elämänperhonen" (Butterfly of Life)	Mariska	Immonen, Vartiainen	4:23
9.	"Mandartania"	Mariska	Immonen, Vartiainen	3:30
10.	"Vedenalaista" (Underwater)	Mariska	Immonen, Vartiainen	5:21

== Personnel ==
The credits for Ihmisten edessä are adapted from Discogs.

- Carla Ahonius – styling
- Joakim Bachmann – drums
- Teemu Brunila – lyricist, composer
- Miika Colliander – guitar
- Svante Forsbäck – mastering
- Luis Hererro – bass
- Jukka Immonen – composer, guitar, bass, arranger, mixing, programming, producer, recording
- Ville Juurikkala – photography
- Anssi Kela – bass
- Hannu Korkeamäki – banjo, organ
- Juhani Lappalainen – lyricist
- Leri Leskinen – piano
- Mariska – lyricist
- Anssi Muurimäki – artwork
- Inka Nousiainen – lyricist
- Arttu Peljo – mixing, recording
- Kyösti Salokorpi – lyricist, composer
- A. Stierncreutz – composer
- Jenni Vartiainen – lyricist, composer, vocals, flute, piano
- Aura-S Y. – lyricist

== Charts and certifications ==
=== Weekly charts ===
Chart (2007)	Peak position
Finnish Albums (Suomen virallinen lista)	6

=== Year-end charts ===
Chart (2007)	Position
Finnish Albums (Suomen virallinen lista)	55
Chart (2008)	Position
Finnish Albums (Suomen virallinen lista)	14
Chart (2011)	Position
Finnish Albums (Suomen virallinen lista)	40

=== Certifications ===
Region	Certification	Certified units/sales
Finland (Musiikkituottajat)	2× Platinum	65,628
