= Junat ja naiset =

Single by Jenni Vartiainen

from the album Terra
- Released: 16 August 2013
- Genre: Pop
- Length: 3:34
- Label: Warner Music Finland
- Songwriters: Jukka Petteri Immonen, Mariska Rahikaainen & Jenni Vartiainen

Jenni Vartiainen singles chronology
"Missä muruseni on" (2010)	"Junat ja naiset" (2013)	"Selvästi päihtynyt" (2013)

Music video
- "Junat ja naiset" on YouTube

"Junat ja naiset" (English: Trains and Women) is a Finnish-language song by Finnish pop singer Jenni Vartiainen. It was released in Finland as the lead single from her third studio album Terra on 16 August 2013 by Warner Music Finland.

== Chart performance ==
"Junat ja naiset" debuted at number 15 on the Finnish Singles Chart on the week 41 of 2013.

== Charts ==
Chart (2013)	Peak position
Finland (Suomen virallinen lista)	15
