= List of number-one singles of 2010 (Finland) =

This is the complete list of (physical and digital) number-one singles sold in Finland in 2010 according to the Official Finnish Charts. The list on the left side of the box (Suomen virallinen singlelista, "Official Finnish Singles Chart") represents both physical and digital track sales and the one on the right side (Suomen virallinen latauslista, "Official Finnish Download Chart") represents sales of digital tracks.

== Chart history ==
| Official Finnish Singles Chart | | | | Official Finnish Download Chart | | | |
| Issue date | Song | Artist(s) | Ref | Issue date | Song | Artist(s) | Ref |
|---|---|---|---|---|---|---|---|
| Week 1 (January 5) | "Bad Romance" | Lady Gaga | | Week 1 | "Bad Romance" | Lady Gaga | |
| Week 2 (January 12) | "Bad Romance" | Lady Gaga | | Week 2 | "Bad Romance" | Lady Gaga | |
| Week 3 (January 19) | "Bad Romance" | Lady Gaga | | Week 3 | "Bad Romance" | Lady Gaga | |
| Week 4 (January 26) | "Bad Romance" | Lady Gaga | | Week 4 | "Bad Romance" | Lady Gaga | |
| Week 5 (February 2) | "Mikä boogie" | Fintelligens | | Week 5 | "Mikä boogie" | Fintelligens | |
| Week 6 (February 9) | "En haluu kuolla tänä yönä" | Jenni Vartiainen | | Week 6 | "En haluu kuolla tänä yönä" | Jenni Vartiainen | |
| Week 7 (February 16) | "Bad Romance" | Lady Gaga | | Week 7 | "Bad Romance" | Lady Gaga | |
| Week 8 (February 23) | "Mikä boogie" | Fintelligens | | Week 8 | "Mikä boogie" | Fintelligens | |
| Week 9 (March 2) | "Jos sä tahdot niin" | Jippu & Samuli Edelmann | | Week 9 | "Jos sä tahdot niin" | Jippu & Samuli Edelmann | |
| Week 10 (March 9) | "Stereo Love" | Edward Maya & Vika Jigulina | | Week 10 | "Stereo Love" | Edward Maya & Vika Jigulina | |
| Week 11 (March 16) | "Stereo Love" | Edward Maya & Vika Jigulina | | Week 11 | "Stereo Love" | Edward Maya & Vika Jigulina | |
| Week 12 (March 23) | "Best Time of Your Life" | The Giant Leap | | Week 12 | "Best Time of Your Life" | The Giant Leap | |
| Week 13 (March 30) | "Linna Espanjassa" | Viikate | | Week 13 | "En haluu kuolla tänä yönä" | Jenni Vartiainen | |
| Week 14 (April 6) | "Decade of Darkness" | Before the Dawn | | Week 14 | "En haluu kuolla tänä yönä" | Jenni Vartiainen | |
| Week 15 (April 13) | "Oi beibi 16" | Raptori | | Week 15 | "Oi beibi 16" | Raptori | |
| Week 16 (April 20) | "Oi beibi 16" | Raptori | | Week 16 | "Oi beibi 16" | Raptori | |
| Week 17 (April 27) | "Stereo Love" | Edward Maya & Vika Jigulina | | Week 17 | "Stereo Love" | Edward Maya & Vika Jigulina | |
| Week 18 (May 4) | "Stereo Love" | Edward Maya & Vika Jigulina | | Week 18 | "Stereo Love" | Edward Maya & Vika Jigulina | |
| Week 19 (May 11) | "Stereo Love" | Edward Maya & Vika Jigulina | | Week 19 | "Stereo Love" | Edward Maya & Vika Jigulina | |
| Week 20 (May 18) | "Stereo Love" | Edward Maya & Vika Jigulina | | Week 20 | "Stereo Love" | Edward Maya & Vika Jigulina | |
| Week 21 (May 24) | "Stereo Love" | Edward Maya & Vika Jigulina | | Week 21 | "Stereo Love" | Edward Maya & Vika Jigulina | |
| Week 22 (June 1) | "Satellite" | Lena | | Week 22 | "Satellite" | Lena | |
| Week 23 (June 8) | "Satellite" | Lena | | Week 23 | "Satellite" | Lena | |
| Week 24 (June 15) | "Waka Waka (This; Time for Africa)" | Shakira | | Week 24 | "Waka Waka (This; Time for Africa)" | Shakira | |
| Week 25 (June 22) | "Alejandro" | Lady Gaga | | Week 25 | "Alejandro" | Lady Gaga | |
| Week 26 (June 29) | "Alejandro" | Lady Gaga | | Week 26 | "Alejandro" | Lady Gaga | |
| Week 27 (July 6) | "Minä" | Kymppilinja (feat. Mariska) | | Week 27 | "Minä" | Kymppilinja (feat. Mariska) | |
| Week 28 (July 13) | "Alejandro" | Lady Gaga | | Week 28 | "Alejandro" | Lady Gaga | |
| Week 29 (July 20) | "Waka Waka (This; Time for Africa)" | Shakira | | Week 29 | "Waka Waka (This; Time for Africa)" | Shakira | |
| Week 30 (July 27) | "Alejandro" | Lady Gaga | | Week 30 | "Alejandro" | Lady Gaga | |
| Week 31 (August 3) | "Waka Waka (This; Time for Africa)" | Shakira | | Week 31 | "Waka Waka (This; Time for Africa)" | Shakira | |
| Week 32 (August 10) | "We No Speak Americano" | Yolanda Be Cool and DCUP | | Week 32 | "We No Speak Americano" | Yolanda Be Cool and DCUP | |
| Week 33 (August 17) | "Jippikayjei" | Cheek | | Week 33 | "Jippikayjei" | Cheek | |
| Week 34 (August 24) | "Love the Way You Lie" | Eminem (feat. Rihanna) | | Week 34 | "Love the Way You Lie" | Eminem (feat. Rihanna) | |
| Week 35 (August 31) | "Love the Way You Lie" | Eminem (feat. Rihanna) | | Week 35 | "Love the Way You Lie" | Eminem (feat. Rihanna) | |
| Week 36 (September 7) | Juurta jaksain EP | Mokoma | | Week 36 | "Love the Way You Lie" | Eminem (feat. Rihanna) | |
| Week 37 (September 14) | "Love the Way You Lie" | Eminem (feat. Rihanna) | | Week 37 | "Love the Way You Lie" | Eminem (feat. Rihanna) | |
| Week 38 (September 21) | "Missä muruseni on" | Jenni Vartiainen | | Week 38 | "Missä muruseni on" | Jenni Vartiainen | |
| Week 39 (September 28) | "Vapaa" | Kaija Koo | | Week 39 | "Vapaa" | Kaija Koo | |
| Week 40 (October 5) | "Missä muruseni on" | Jenni Vartiainen | | Week 40 | "Missä muruseni on" | Jenni Vartiainen | |
| Week 41 (October 12) | "Missä muruseni on" | Jenni Vartiainen | | Week 41 | "Missä muruseni on" | Jenni Vartiainen | |
| Week 42 (October 19) | "Missä muruseni on" | Jenni Vartiainen | | Week 42 | "Missä muruseni on" | Jenni Vartiainen | |
| Week 43 (October 26) | "Missä muruseni on" | Jenni Vartiainen | | Week 43 | "Missä muruseni on" | Jenni Vartiainen | |
| Week 44 (November 3) | "Missä muruseni on" | Jenni Vartiainen | | Week 44 | "Missä muruseni on" | Jenni Vartiainen | |
| Week 45 (November 10) | "Missä muruseni on" | Jenni Vartiainen | | Week 45 | "Missä muruseni on" | Jenni Vartiainen | |
| Week 46 (November 17) | "Missä muruseni on" | Jenni Vartiainen | | Week 46 | "Missä muruseni on" | Jenni Vartiainen | |
| Week 47 (November 24) | "Hirmuliskojen pikkujoululevy" | Hevisaurus | | Week 47 | "Missä muruseni on" | Jenni Vartiainen | |
| Week 48 (December 1) | "Hirmuliskojen pikkujoululevy" | Hevisaurus | | Week 48 | "Missä muruseni on" | Jenni Vartiainen | |
| Week 49 (December 8) | "Hirmuliskojen pikkujoululevy" | Hevisaurus | | Week 49 | "Missä muruseni on" | Jenni Vartiainen | |
| Week 50 (December 15) | "Barbra Streisand" | Duck Sauce | | Week 50 | "Barbra Streisand" | Duck Sauce | |
| Week 51 (December 22) | "Hirmuliskojen pikkujoululevy" | Hevisaurus | | Week 51 | "Missä muruseni on" | Jenni Vartiainen | |
| Week 52 (December 29) | "Missä muruseni on" | Jenni Vartiainen | | Week 52 | "Missä muruseni on" | Jenni Vartiainen | |

== See also ==
- List of number-one albums of 2010 (Finland)
