= Seili (album) =

Studio album by Jenni Vartiainen
- Released: 31 March 2010
- Genre: Pop, synthpop, dance-pop
- Length: 36:44
- Language: Finnish
- Label: WEA, Warner Music Finland
- Producer: Jukka Immonen

Jenni Vartiainen chronology
Ihmisten edessä (2007)	Seili (2010)	Terra (2013)

Singles from Seili
- 1. "En haluu kuolla tänä yönä" Released: 1 February 2010; 2. "Nettiin" Released: 17 June 2010; 3. "Missä muruseni on" Released: 23 August 2010

Seili is the second studio album by Finnish pop singer Jenni Vartiainen. It was released by Warner Music Finland digitally on 31 March 2010, with the official physical release following on 14 April. From 31 March to the official physical release date, the album was sold at €19 in conjunction with Ilta-Sanomat. The album was re-released on 14 January 2011, in a limited vinyl edition. The Finnish-language album, incorporating electro and synthpop elements along with melancholic piano ballads, is named after the island Seili (Själö in Swedish), located off the south-west coast of Finland. The album was produced and co-written by Jukka Immonen with Vartiainen writing also two of the songs. The main lyricists were Teemu Brunila and Mariska who contributed to the thematical dualism of the album—Brunila wrote the happier songs about publicity and finding love while Mariska wrote the lyrics for the songs that deal with darker and more serious themes, such as death. Another lyricist was Paula Vesala (from the pop rock duo PMMP). Vartiainen participated more in the production than with her debut album Ihmisten edessä, by playing for example piano and kantele.

Critically acclaimed for its vocals and successful combination of ballads and pop, though criticized for lack of peculiarity and a somewhat inconsistent song selection, Seili spent 62 non-consecutive weeks on the Finnish Albums Chart since its release—with 15 weeks atop the chart—and sold over 95,000 copies in 2010, becoming the best-selling album of 2010 in Finland. Altogether, Seili has sold over 150,000 copies since its release and currently ranks 14th in the list of the best-selling albums of all time in Finland. The album received three Emma Awards in February 2011: for Album of the Year, Pop/Rock Album of the Year and Best-Selling Album of the Year. The album included also two Emma-winning songs, the gold-selling singles "En haluu kuolla tänä yönä" and "Missä muruseni on", winning in the categories Song of the Year and Music Video of the Year, respectively. "Nettiin" was released as the third single and the album spawned two promotional singles, "Duran Duran", which sold also gold, and "Eikö kukaan voi meitä pelastaa?". "Missä muruseni on" was the major chart hit, dominating the top-three spots of the Finnish Singles Chart from August 2010 to January 2011 and becoming the third-best-selling single of 2011 in Finland. To promote the album, Vartiainen embarked on a concert tour titled Seili, spanning from April 2010 to August 2011 and consisting of 170 shows.

== Background and composition ==
Thematically more polarized than its predecessor Ihmisten edessä, Seili has been described as being based on contrasts as it deals with both darker and happier themes and combines elements of classical music with pop and schlager melodies with rock. Vartiainen has said the overall inspiration for the album came from the imagery of the movie Blade Runner and songs from the 1980s she used in her programs during her figure skating career. The name of the album symbolizes "a trip to an unknown island, an escape from normal life to the world of music" and the content of the album places "during the dramatical moments between 3 am and 5 am" when a day ends a new one begins and people are, as Vartiainen has put it, "sensitive to new ideas", due to either fatigue or intoxication. Vartiainen attributes the dualistic nature of the album to her professional relation with the lyricists Mariska and Teemu Brunila, who Vartiainen is also friends with, saying "Mariska knows well Vartiainen's darker, more philosophical side". In an interview with Dome.fi in March 2010, Vartiainen said that while Mariska represents the dark and serious themes such as death, Brunila with his lyrical products "goes towards the light" and that the point in the album is "to reflect on life and death". Along with the two thematical polarities, the album deals also with tricky relationships and hunger for fame, as showcased by the Western-sounding "Nettiin", which starts with a banjo and a bass and is literally about naked pictures, taken and publicized by an ex-boyfriend, and paratextually about the line between privacy and publicity.

The album introduces also more instruments than Ihmisten edessä; Vartiainen starts the album by playing piano in the dark introitus "Koti" (Home). The second song "Seili" is also dark-themed—the song is about the namesake island located in the archipelago off the coast of Turku where leprotic and mentally ill patients were sent from 17th century onwards, along with boards they could build their own coffins with. The third song and the lead single "En haluu kuolla tänä yönä"—in English, I Don't Wanna Die Tonight—goes on with the theme, though with an electronic dance beat that "emphasizes the will to live". The fifth song and the third single "Missä muruseni on" (Where My Sweetheart Is) was written by Mariska who got the inspiration for the song while reading Indian erotic literature on her balcony on a hot summer's day. The song is a ballad where the singer talks about being far away from her loved one and asks the wind to blow to the place "where [one's] sweetheart is"—by November 2010, the lyrics had even found their way to Finnish obituaries and gravestones. The sixth, dance-influenced song and first promotional single "Duran Duran" is about discovering one's soulmate as the lyrics wonder whether "this is how it feels like when you find the right one" along with saying "Jenni can't escape this new feeling". Vartiainen entered new musical territories also by playing piano and kantele in the song "Kiittämätön" (Ungrateful), which is written by Vartiainen and Paula Vesala and deals with agony Vartiainen suffered from while growing up during high school.

== Critical reception ==
Professional ratings
Review scores
Source	Rating
Helsingin Sanomat	3/5 stars
Keskisuomalainen	4/5 stars
MTV3	4.5/5 stars
Rumba	3/5 stars
Soundi	3/5 stars
Stara	4/5 stars

Seili has received mixed to positive reviews from music critics. Most of the reviewers have been appreciative of the vocals and the successful combination of synthpop and darker ballads, but more or less critical with the notable contrast between the thumping pop song "Nettiin" and the rest of the album and Vartiainen's lack of peculiarity. Teemu Fiilin of the magazine Rumba gave Seili three out of five stars, saying that "Seili follows pretty much the schlager-ish pattern of a poet girl's inflated electro-pop". He complimented "En haluu kuolla tänä yönä" as "a brilliant pop song, suitable to be sung by a [then] 27-year-old Jenni Vartiainen who is enjoying her life". Due to the accompaniment of the more poetical, dramatical and mature songs written by Mariska, Fiilin considered "Nettiin" "a really epic fail" that "would be a lot of fun if performed by Tea Hiilloste on Kids Top 20". He thought "Duran Duran" is also brilliant, but considered Vartiainen to be more talented with faster songs, because she, when singing melancholic songs, "lags kilometers behind [singer] Chisu". The pop rock magazine Stara said the album is not as good at first hearing as Vartiainen's debut Ihmisten edessä, but it gave the album four out five stars. The magazine complimented the aggregate of "En haluu kuolla tänä yönä" and the beauty and elegance of "Duran Duran". Stara was less harsh on reviewing the inclusion of "Nettiin", saying the Western-themed sounds seem a bit odd, but that the song is good in its entirety.

Helsingin Sanomat gave the song three out of five stars, saying the album is suitable but that "Vartiainen does not stand out at all with the song selections and singing voice, as Chisu does". MTV3 gave the song four and a half stars out of five, criticizing the inclusion of "Nettiin" for the sake of consistency and saying none of the songs are particularly catchy. However, MTV3 complimented "Kiittämätön", "Duran Duran" and "Eikö kukaan voi meitä pelastaa?" for their massive sounds and considered Seili a brilliant summer album. Writing for the rock magazine Soundi, Antti Luukkanen gave Seili three out of five stars, saying songwriters Teemu Brunila and Mariska and producer Jukka Immonen "gain credibility for putting the dark piano ballads and the thumping pop songs into balance, creating a coherent and compact entirety". The magazine said Vartiainen's singing voice "saves the album", though it regarded many of the songs as "hypocritical" or even "tasteless" (such as "Nettiin"). Keskisuomalainen deemed the album's rating as four stars out of five. The newspaper considered Seili "a splendid entirety that, however, lacks that one, ingenious song that stands out from the others", saying also that the record—the name of which comes from the island where leprotic patients and the mentally ill were sent from the 17th century onwards—is "elaborate pop that deals with the most fundamental questions". In conclusion, Keskisuomalainen said that the album is "a successful combination of introverted ethereality, light-hearted pop and dramatical thunder".

== Chart performance ==
Upon its digital release in April 2010, Seili debuted at number one on the Finnish Albums Chart. The album went gradually down to number seven in early August, after which it vacillated between seven and four. Seili rose back to number one in October, holding the top spot for 12 consecutive weeks and charted in the top three until early March 2011. Altogether, the album spent 15 weeks atop the chart, 58 weeks in the top ten and it charted for a total of 62 non-consecutive weeks, over a year, becoming the 11th-longest-charting of all time. Seili took a second jump in July 2011, as it leaped from number 17 to number two, after which it dropped out of the chart. With sales surpassing 150,000 copies (from which 95,000 in 2010, 42,000 in 2011 and 14,000 in 2012), Seili was the best-selling album in Finland in 2010 and the sixth-best-selling in 2011, receiving the septuple-platinum certification. The album was re-released by Finnish music retailers in a limited vinyl edition on 14 January 2011, as part of their joint Levyale campaign. The edition was sold out in five days.

== Promotion ==
To promote her album, Vartiainen embarked on her concert tour titled Seili in April 2010. The tour, which consisted of 170 shows and lasted all the way to August 2011, included performances for example at the Provinssirock festival in the summer of 2010 and 2011. Amid the tour in the spring of 2011, she denied some tabloid rumors that she would have canceled interviews due to stress and exhaustion. In July 2011, Vartiainen and her band met with some misfortune as the tour bus broke down while on its way from Oulu to Vaasa. The last concert of the tour took place on the Main Stage at the Finnish National Theatre in Helsinki on 28 August 2011, with the specialty that the concert was broadcast live at Finnkino film theaters in 11 other localities around Finland, for the first time in the history of the theater. The tickets to the concert were sold out within a couple of hours. At the National Theatre, Vartiainen sang the album's song "Halvalla" as a duet with Vesa-Matti Loiri, which she said was her long-time "dream come true". Due to technical difficulties, the concert could not be broadcast in Lahti and Kuopio. In August 2011, Vartiainen released a DVD of the Seili tour, as well as a photo-book, consisting of photographs from the tour, taken by Kalle Björklid.

== Singles ==
The lead single from Seili, "En haluu kuolla tänä yönä", was released on 1 February 2010. Peaking at number one the second week on the Finnish Singles Chart and charting for 21 weeks, the single sold gold with over 11,000 copies, won the Emma Award for Song of the Year and was the most-played song on commercial Finnish radio stations in 2010 with over 5,200 plays. Vartiainen was less successful with the second single "Nettiin", following suit on 17 July and peaking at number 12 in its 11 chart weeks. The third single "Missä muruseni on", released on 23 August, was the major chart hit from the album, spending 32 weeks on the chart until early 2011, including 11 weeks on the top. The single sold gold with over 18,000 copies and was the third-best-selling single of 2011 in Finland and its music video, depicting a woman looking to the sea and singing about her yearning for her loved one, won the 2011 Emma Award for the Music Video of the Year. In 2010, the song was also the second-most-played song on the radio stations of the Finnish Broadcasting Company, the fifth-most-played on commercial radio stations and it was chosen the Finnish schlager of 2010 in a contest held by the radio station Iskelmä. On 13 December the first promotional single "Duran Duran" was released. Similar to "Nettiin" in its chart success, the song charted for 11 weeks, peaking at number 10 in February 2011, but sold gold with 5,400 copies. The song "Eikö kukaan voi meitä pelastaa?" was released as the second promotional single in the spring of 2011 and its music video was released on 14 June.

== Track listing ==
- Digital download

No.	Title	Lyrics	Composer	Length
1.	"Koti" (Home)	^{[A]}	Teemu Brunila	1:25
2.	"Seili"	Mariska	Jukka Immonen, Jenni Vartiainen	4:47
3.	"En haluu kuolla tänä yönä" (I Don't Wanna Die Tonight)	Mariska	Immonen, Vartiainen	3:45
4.	"Nettiin" (Onto the Internet)	Brunila	Brunila	3:36
5.	"Missä muruseni on" (Where My Sweetheart Is)	Mariska	Immonen, Vartiainen	3:42
6.	"Duran Duran"	Brunila	Brunila	3:52
7.	"Minä ja hän" (Me and Him/Her)	Mariska	Immonen, Hannu Korkeamäki, Vartiainen	4:28
8.	"Kiittämätön" (Ungrateful)	Immonen, Mariska, Vartiainen, Paula Vesala^{[B]}	Immonen, Vartiainen	3:17
9.	"Eikö kukaan voi meitä pelastaa?" (Can't Anyone Save Us?)	Vartiainen, Vesala	Immonen, Vartiainen, Vesala	3:37
10.	"Halvalla" (At a Cheap Price)	Brunila	Brunila	4:15

Notes

- A The song is instrumental, played with piano.
- B Fono.fi, a music database maintained by the Finnish Broadcasting Company, provides ambiguous credits; the lyrics are either by Immonen, Mariska, Vartiainen and Vesala or solely by Mariska.

== Personnel ==
The credits for Seili are adapted from Allrovi.

- Teemu Brunila – composer, lyricist
- Jukka Immonen – composer, synthesizers (Jupiter-8, Prophet 600, Solina)
- Asko Kallonen – A&R
- Hannu Korkeamäki – composer, banjo
- Pessi Levanto – piano
- Mariska – composer, lyricist
- Patric Sarin – composer
- Jenni Vartiainen – vocals, composer, lyricist, kantele, piano, synthesizers (Solina, Jupiter-8, SH-101, Prophet 600)
- Paula Vesala – composer, lyricist

== Charts and certifications ==
=== Weekly charts ===
Chart (2010)	Peak position
Finnish Albums (Suomen virallinen lista)	1

=== Year-end charts ===
Chart (2010)	Position
Finnish Albums (Suomen virallinen lista)	1
Chart (2011)	Position
Finnish Albums (Suomen virallinen lista)	6
Chart (2012)	Position
Finnish Albums (Suomen virallinen lista)	33

=== Certifications ===
Region	Certification	Certified units/sales
Finland (Musiikkituottajat)	7× Platinum	151,833

== See also ==
- List of best-selling albums in Finland
- List of number-one albums of 2010 (Finland)
- List of number-one albums of 2011 (Finland)
