= Gimmel (band) =

Finnish girl group

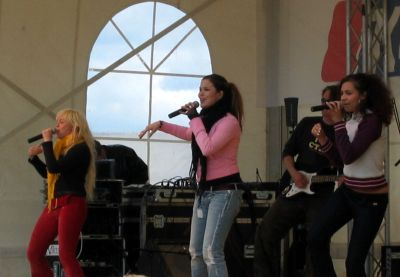
- Gimmel in 2003

Background information
- Origin: Finland
- Genres: pop
- Years active: 2002–2004
- Labels: BMG
- Members: Jenni Vartiainen; Susanna Korvala; Ushma Karnani

Gimmel were a Finnish girl group.

In the spring of 2002, a Popstars competition was held in Finland to find members to form a pop band. 454 young women participated in the singing trials. 25 girls made it to the final selection round. Members of the first Popstars band in Finland were Jenni Vartiainen, Susanna Korvala, Ushma Karnani, and Jonna Pirinen. After a few weeks arguments between the girls increased, and Jonna decided to leave the band for a solo career. Ushma, Susanna, and Jenni continued. They decided to adopt the name Gimmel.

Gimmel is the third letter in the Hebrew alphabet, and it also means the number three. A gimmel ring was a Renaissance betrothal and wedding ring made in three parts, or two.

The band's debut single "Etsit muijaa seuraavaa" was released on 25 October 2002. It sold gold in a few days and platinum in one and a half weeks. In its first week on the charts, the single peaked at number one the Finnish Singles Chart and held that position for four weeks. Gimmel's first album Lentoon came out on 22 November 2002 and, just after it was published, it went to the number one spot in the Finnish Albums Chart, remaining there for three weeks. In 2002, the album sold almost 85 000 copies, becoming the best-selling album of the year.

Gimmel's second single Roviolla was released on 27 January 2003 and it peaked at number three on the Singles Chart. The single features a previously unpublished piece called Tatuointi. At the 2003 Emma Awards, the band won the Awards for New Pop/Rock Artist of the Year, Debut Album of the Year and Best-Selling Album of the Year.

In the summer of 2003, they released their second album Kaksi kertaa enemmän, and in the end of the year a music video Harmaata lunta.

The band broke up on 16 October 2004.
