= Kukkurukuu =

Studio album by Mariska & Pahat Sudet
- Released: 14 September 2012
- Length: 32:16
- Label: Fried Music, Warner Music Finland
- Producer: Jukka Immonen

Mariska & Pahat Sudet chronology
Mariska & Pahat Sudet (2010)	Kukkurukuu (2012)

Kukkurukuu is the second album by a Finnish band Mariska & Pahat Sudet. It was released on 14 September 2012. In the first week of release, the album peaked at number three on the Official Finnish Album Chart. According to IFPI Finland, the album sold 11,744 copies during 2012.

== Themes ==
Mariska has stated that the main themes on the album are death and love. She had previously suffered from a fear of death, but has since then learned to value life and live every day like her last. The title Kukkurukuu was inspired by a Mexican song ”Cucurrucucú paloma”.

== Singles ==
The album has spawned three singles. "Liekki" was released in June 2012. Mariska has said that this song was inspired by both Leonard Cohen and her own heartaches. The title track was released as a single in August 2012 and remains the only song from the album to have appeared on the Official Finnish Singles Chart where it peaked at number 16. The third single "Kuolema on kalamies" was released in November 2012.

== Track listing ==
No.	Title	Length
1.	"Matkalla manalaan"	3:18
2.	"Liekki"	3:27
3.	"Kuolema on kalamies"	2:47
4.	"Kukkurukuu"	3:56
5.	"Sinä päivänä kun sä lähdet"	4:02
6.	"Veri on vettä sakeampaa"	3:33
7.	"Kettu ja korppi"	2:22
8.	"La Muerte"	3:19
9.	"Kalpeet"	3:04
10.	"Ukon laulu"	2:28

== Chart performance ==
Chart (2010)	Peak position
Finland (Suomen virallinen lista)	3
