= Lord Est =

Finnish dancehall reggae

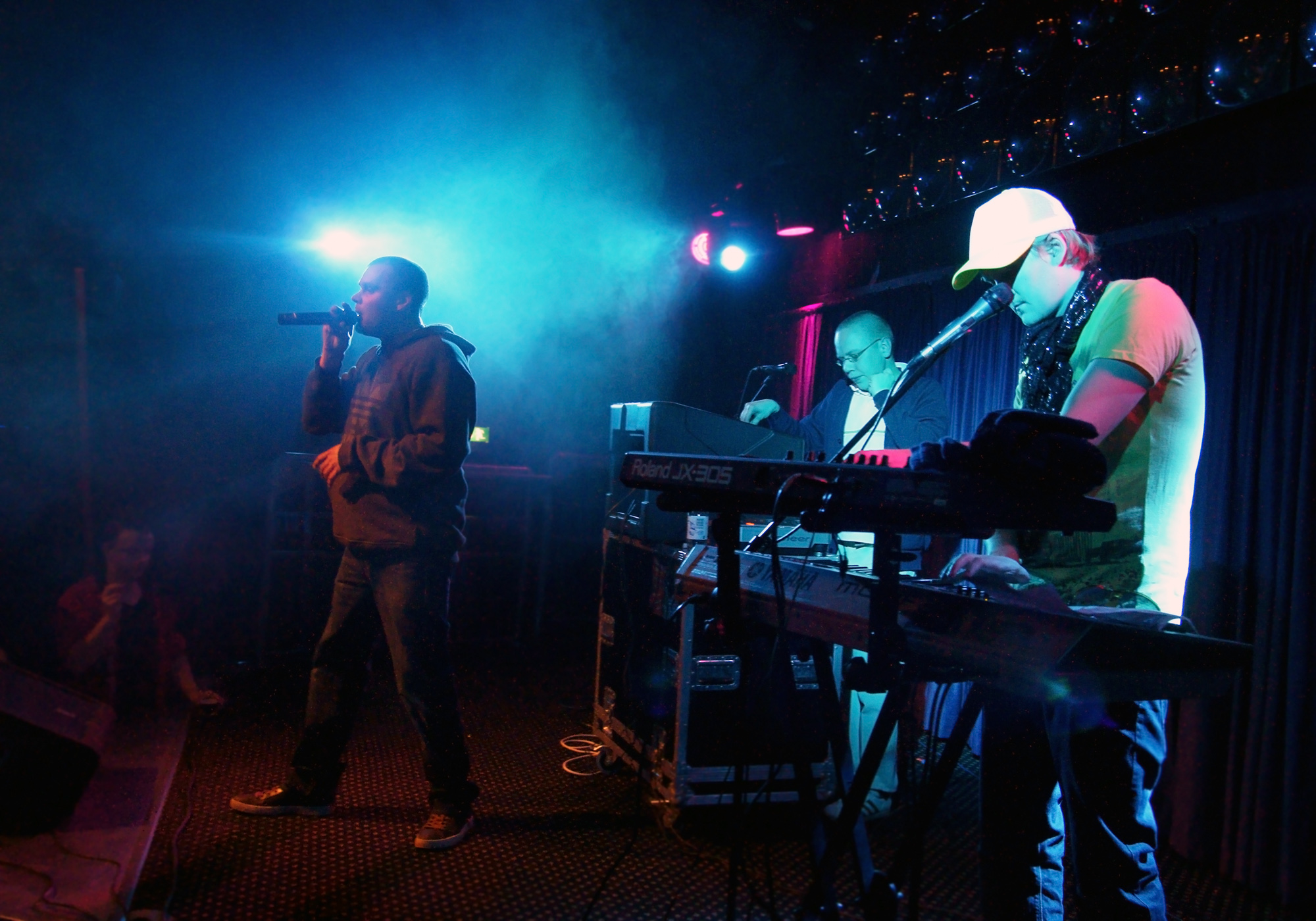
- Lord Est at Bar Kino on 4 February 2010

Background information
- Born: Tampere, Finland
- Genres: Reggae, Dancehall
- Years active: 2001 – present
- Labels: GB Fam Records; Hype Records
- Website: www.lordest.com

Lord Est, or Tuomo Hiironmäki, is a singer-songwriter from Lempäälä, Finland. Lord Est's music is influenced by Caribbean dancehall, reggae and soca. His most famous songs are Reggarekka, Hellä Ori and his feature on Petri Nygård’s Selvä Päivä. Lord Est has found success with his collaborative projects with Mariska, Cheek, Robin Packalen, Mikael Gabriel, Spekti, MEGA-Ertsi, Raappana and Meiju Suvas.

Tuomo Hiironmäki started in the 1990s as a rapper and a part of Finnish hiphop group Ghetto Blasta. His stage name comes from his graffiti tag, which was "Est". The title Lord was invented by his friend from Ghetto Blasta, Big Jay. Ghetto Blasta broke up and Lord Est became more interested in the new dancehall trend by Radio Mafia's late-night show Roots & Culture, hosted by Tero Kaski. After spending a couple of years in the UK, he came up with the idea of doing dancehall in Finnish. Lord Est started doing music with his brother Uncle Tan. In general, Tuomo wrote the lyrics and Uncle Tan composed the music. Uncle Tan also played keyboard on Lord Est's live band until 2013.

Lord Est's debut single "Viskit ja rommit" had some airplay on Radio Mafia and became a minor hit in summer 2001. In the year 2002 Lord Est released their debut album called Aatelinen. In 2005 Lord Est released Päivät töissä with singles "Hellä ori" and "Heristä nyrkkii". 3rd album Tulin teitä muistuttaan was released in 2008 and was produced by DJ Control of Beats & Styles. It included singles "Sä teet" and "Sun vieres on lämmin". 4th album Se on päätetty was released in 2009 and singles "Nyt saa juhlia taas" and Tänään räjähtää.

== Discography ==
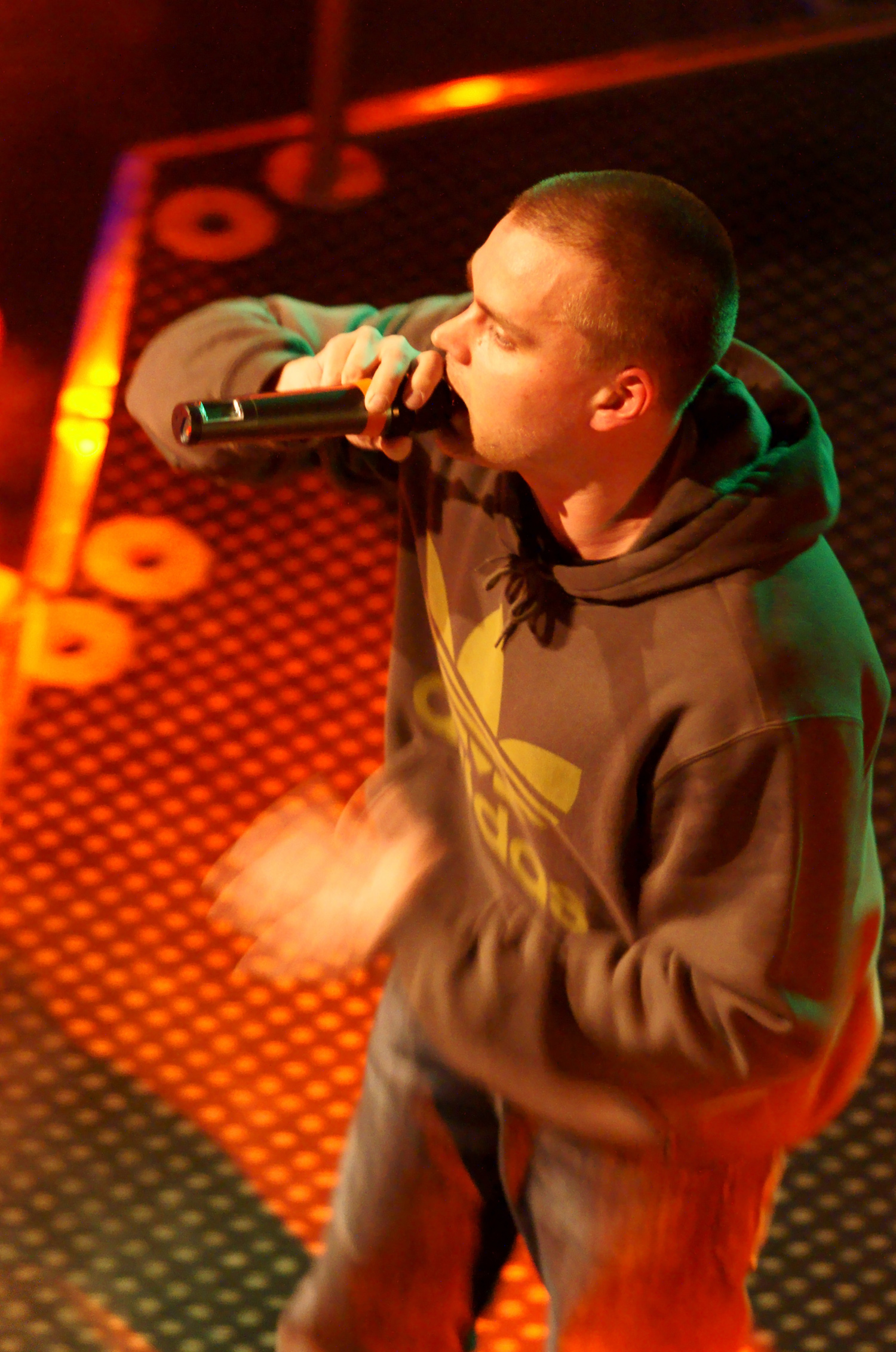
Tuomo Hiironmäki (Lord Est) at Bar Kino

=== Albums ===
- 2002: Aatelinen
- 2005: Päivät töissä
- 2008: Tulin teitä muistuttaan
- 2009: Se on päätetty
- 2011: Sonmoro senjoro
- 2015: Ilo-Olo

Collection albums

- 2009: Trilogy (Collection album)
- 2012: Lestin Ruudeimmat (Collection album)

=== Singles ===
Year	Single	Chart positions	Album
Year	Single	FIN	Album
2002	"Talvi"	17	
2004	"Heristä nyrkkii"	11	
2005	"Hellä ori"	15	
2005	"Tämä on festi" (Spesialisti / Lord Est)	2	
2008	"Sä teet"	12	
2010	"Selvä päivä" (Petri Nygård featuring Lord Est)	1	
2011	"Reggaerekka" (featuring Petri Nygård)	1	
2011	"Vuosi vaihtuu" (featuring Mikael Gabriel)	1	
2014	"Hanat auki" (featuring Spekti)	13	
2016	"Ralleissa" (featuring Peris)		
2016	"Dirlandaa"		
2017	"Isä Tulee"		
2018	"Bumpperi"		
2018	"Ota shottii ku sotilas" (featuring Petri Nygård)		
2019	"Kaverin äiti"		
2019	"Tuuttaat varattuu" (featuring Raappana)		
2019	"Keski-Suomeen" (featuring Meiju Suvas)		
2020	"Keski-Suomeen remix" (featuring Yksi Totuus)		
202O	"LINKO" (featuring MEGA-ERTSI)		
2020	"Tappituntuma"		
2021	"Vanhojen tanssit" (featuring Poju)		
2021	"Exit plääni"		
2022	"Kostee ku Saimaa"		
2023	"Hän on män"		

Others

- 2001: "Viskit ja rommit"
- 2002: "Linko"
- 2005: "Hellä ori" (feat Mariska)
- 2008: "Ilman itsekurii"
- 2008: "Jotkut muijat" (feat Mariska)
- 2009: "Nyt saa juhlia taas"
- 2009: "Tänään räjähtää" (feat Åke Blomqvist)
- 2010: "Keho on mun temppeli"
- 2011: "Juoksen vapaana kaupunkiin"
- 2011: "Vuosi vaihtuu (feat Migael Gabriel)"
- 2012: "Pelaat ja juhlit"
- 2013: "Huono päivä, hyvä ilta"
- 2013: "Jotain mukavaa"
- 2014: "Hanat auki (feat Spekti)"
- 2014: "Bad niinku Badding"
- 2015: "Anna illan jatkuu"
- 2014: "Kun sä astut huoneeseen (feat Juju)"
- 2016: "Ralleissa (feat Peris)"
- 2016: "Dirlandaa"
- 2017: "Isä tulee"
- 2018: "Bumpperi"
- 2018: "Ota shottii ku sotilas (feat Petri Nygård)"
- 2019: "Kaverin äiti"
- 2019: "Tuuttaat varattuu (feat Raappana)"
- 2019: "Keski-Suomeen (feat Meiju Suvas)"
- 202o: "Keski-Suomeen remix (feat Yksi Totuus)"
- 202o: "LINKO (feat MEGA-ERTSI)"
- 2020: "Tappituntuma"
- 2021: "Vanhojen tanssit (feat Poju)"
- 2021: "Exit plääni"
- 2022: "Kostee ku saimaa"
- 2023: "Hän on män"

=== Music videos ===
- 2002: "Linko"
- 2008: "Sä teet"
- 2010: "Keho on mun temppeli"
- 2010: "Selvä päivä" (Petri Nygård feat Lord Est)
- 2011: "Reggaerekka" (feat Petri Nygård)
- 2011: "Juoksen vapaana kaupunkiin"

=== Guest ===
- 2002: Rockin Da North – "Tuu mun uniin" (feat Janina Frostell, Skandaali, YOR123, Ezkimo & Lord Est)
- 2002: Rockin Da North – "Kingsize" (feat. B.O.W, Lord Est, YOR123 & Ezkimo)
- 2004: Hanna B – "Perjantai-ilta" (feat. Urbaanilegenda & Lord Est)
- 2006: Lord Est – "Mies ilman motiivia" (Versio - Suomireggaen juurikattaus -kokoelmalla)
- 2008: Elastinen, Cheek & Lord Est – "Syvällä pelissä" (from Syvällä Pelissä vol. 1 collection album)
- 2009: Cheek – "Kaikki hyvin" (feat Lord Est)
- 2010: Petri Nygård – "Selvä päivä" (feat Lord Est)
