= Mariska & Pahat Sudet (album) =

Studio album by Mariska & Pahat Sudet
- Released: 10 May 2010
- Length: 39:12 original version 42:53 reissue
- Label: Fried Music, Sony Music
- Producer: Jukka Immonen

Mariska & Pahat Sudet chronology
Mariska & Pahat Sudet (album) (2010)	Kukkurukuu (2012)

Mariska & Pahat Sudet is the debut album of the Finnish band Mariska & Pahat Sudet. It was released on 10 May 2010. In its first week of release, the album peaked at number 16 on the Official Finnish Album Chart. In spite of the somewhat low peak position, the album managed to stay on the chart for 24 weeks and eventually earned the band a gold record.

== Singles ==
Two singles were released,"Suloinen myrkynkeittäjä" and "Kokkaa mua".

== Track listing ==
No.	Title	Length
1.	"Hurrikaani"	3:54
2.	"Suloinen myrkynkeittäjä"	3:26
3.	"Venäläinen ruletti"	4:09
4.	"Kokkaa mua"	3:56
5.	"Pippurii tai hunajaa"	3:21
6.	"Bingo!"	3:41
7.	"Pyhäpäivä"	3:32
8.	"Painu helvettiin"	3:56
9.	"Jotain vahvempaa"	3:43
10.	"Et löydä oikeempaa" (featuring Super Janne)	4:20
11.	"Sua kaipaan" (included on the reissue)	4:09

== Chart performance ==
Chart (2010)	Peak position
Finland (Suomen virallinen lista)	16
