= Nettiin =

Single by Jenni Vartiainen

from the album Seili
- Released: 17 July 2010
- Recorded: 2010
- Genre: Pop
- Length: 3:36
- Label: Warner Music Finland
- Songwriter: Teemu Brunila

Jenni Vartiainen singles chronology
"En haluu kuolla tänä yönä" (2010)	"Nettiin" (2010)	"Missä muruseni on" (2010)

Music video
- "Nettiin" on YouTube

"Nettiin" (English: Onto the Internet) is a Finnish-language song by Finnish singer Jenni Vartiainen, released from her second studio album Seili by Warner Music on 17 July 2010. The song is written by Teemu Brunila. The release includes the song, its remix and a remix of her previous single, "En haluu kuolla tänä yönä".

== Chart performance ==
The song stayed in the Finnish Singles Chart for a total of 11 weeks peaking at number 13 on week 29, in July 2010.

== Track listing ==
No.	Title	Length
1.	"Nettiin" (Onto the Internet)	3:36
2.	"Nettiin (JS16 Remix)"	4:13
3.	"En haluu kuolla tänä yönä (JS16 Remix)" (I Don't Wanna Die Tonight)	5:09

== Charts ==
Chart (2010)	Peak position
Finland (Suomen virallinen lista)	13
