= Terra (Jenni Vartiainen album) =

Studio album by Jenni Vartiainen
- Released: October 4, 2013
- Length: 38:33
- Language: Finnish
- Label: Warner Music Finland
- Producer: Jukka Immonen

Jenni Vartiainen chronology
| Seili (2010) | Terra (2013) |

Singles from Terra
- 1. "Junat ja naiset" Released: August 16, 2013; 2. "Selvästi päihtynyt" Released: September 14, 2013; 3. "Suru on kunniavieras" Released: January 27, 2014

Terra is the third studio album by Finnish pop singer Jenni Vartiainen. Released on October 4, 2013 by Warner Music Finland, the album peaked at number one on the Finnish Albums Chart. The lead single "Junat ja naiset" was released on August 16, 2013 and peaked at number 15 on the Finnish Singles Chart.

== Track listing ==
| No. | Title | Length |
|---|---|---|
| 1. | "Muistan kirkkauden" | 3:29 |
| 2. | "Junat ja naiset" | 3:34 |
| 3. | "Selvästi päihtynyt" | 3:52 |
| 4. | "Kaukaa" | 3:43 |
| 5. | "Päivät on täällä hitaita" | 3:23 |
| 6. | "Tyttövuodet" | 3:44 |
| 7. | "Suru on kunniavieras" | 3:33 |
| 8. | "Sivullinen" | 3:54 |
| 9. | "Minä sinua vaan" | 5:07 |
| 10. | "Tule meille jouluksi" | 4:14 |

== Charts and certifications ==
=== Charts ===
| Chart (2013) | Peak position |
|---|---|
| Finnish Albums (Suomen virallinen lista) | 1 |

=== Certifications ===
| Region | Certification | Certified units/sales |
|---|---|---|
| Finland (Musiikkituottajat) | 2× Platinum | 62,777 |

== Release history ==
| Region | Date | Format | Label |
|---|---|---|---|
| Finland | October 4, 2013 | CD, digital download | Warner Music Finland |

== See also ==
- List of number-one albums of 2013 (Finland)
