= Toinen =

Promotional single by Jenni Vartiainen

from the album Ihmisten edessä
- Released: 3 December 2007
- Genre: Pop
- Length: 4:08
- Label: Warner Music Finland
- Songwriters: Aura-S (lyrics), Jenni Vartiainen (composer), Jukka Immonen (composer)

"Toinen" (English: Another One) is a Finnish-language song by Finnish pop singer Jenni Vartiainen, released in Finland on 3 December 2007 by Warner Music Group. The first promotional single from her debut album Ihmisten edessä, the song peaked at number 13 on the Finnish Singles Chart in early 2008. The song appeared also on the soundtrack album of the 2007 movie Sooloilua.

== Track listing ==
- Digital download

No.	Title	Length
1.	"Toinen" (Another One)	4:08

== Charts ==
Chart (2008)	Peak position
Finland (Suomen virallinen lista)	13
