= Tunnoton =

2007 Finnish song by Jenni Vartiainen

Single by Jenni Vartiainen

from the album Ihmisten edessä
- Released: 11 April 2007
- Genre: Pop
- Length: 4:16
- Label: Warner Music Finland
- Composer: A. 'Knipi' Stierncreutz
- Lyricist: Juhani Lappalainen

Jenni Vartiainen singles chronology
"Tunnoton" (2007)	"Ihmisten edessä" (2007)

"Tunnoton" (English: Numb) is a Finnish-language song by Finnish pop singer Jenni Vartiainen, released as the debut single from her debut album Ihmisten edessä on 11 April 2007, by Warner Music Finland. Written by Juhani Lappalainen and composed by A. Stierncreutz, the song peaked at number 22 on the Finnish Download Chart.

== Track listing ==
- Digital download

No.	Title	Length
1.	"Tunnoton" (Numb)	4:16

== Charts ==
Chart (2007)	Peak position
Finland Download (Latauslista)	22
