= Kuopio Senior High School of Music and Dance =

High school in Kuopio, Finland

Coordinates: 62°53′25″N 27°40′40″E

Kuopio Senior High School of Music and Dance Finnish: Kuopion yhteiskoulun musiikkilukio

Information
- Established: 1968
- Closed: August 2015
- Enrollment: c. 230

Kuopio Senior High School of Music and Dance (Finnish: Kuopion yhteiskoulun musiikkilukio) was a specialised music and dance high school which was founded in 1968. The dance curriculum was started in 1983. The high school was the first specialised senior high school of Finnish high schools, which specialised in music and dance. The school gained the name Kuopion yhteiskoulun musiikkilukio in 1995. In August 2015, the high school merged with Minna Canth Senior High School to form Kuopio Senior High School of Arts (Lumit) (Kuopion taidelukio Lumit).

Students could get the standard Finnish upper secondary school education in preparation for the matriculation examination, including mathematics, languages, sciences, history, etc. The music curriculum gave insights into Music Theory and Music History, as well as instrumental/group/orchestra/choir work. Dancers had the choice of taking classical ballet classes as well as modern dance. The high school had approximately 230 students, and about half of them came from outside Kuopio.

== Associated schools ==
Close cooperation with the nearby Kuopio Conservatoire gave the students greater chances to study there. The classes completed in the conservatory or in the high school were valid in both institutions when applicable, and thus, they could be counted among the necessary 75 classes for the completion of the upper secondary school. At least 12 of 75 classes had to be music or dance classes.

The school also cooperated with Kuopio Conservatoire, Sibelius Academy's Kuopio unit and Petrozavodsk's Art School number 1. Senior high was one part of a unique education chain of music, which went all the way from kindergarten to doctorates.

== Artist of the Year ==
Artist of the Year was a diploma that was awarded every year to one former student who had made a great public career. The student had to have attended the Kuopio Senior High School of Music and Dance and had to have taken the Matriculation Examination there in order to be eligible.

The Artists of the Year:

- 2001 Musician Sari Kaasinen
- 2002 Dancer-choreographer Jyrki Karttunen
- 2003 Piano artist Mikael Kemppainen
- 2004 Musician Erja Lyytinen
- 2005 Director-choreographer Minna Vainikainen
- 2006 Playwright Anna Krogerus
- 2007 Musician Marko Hietala
- 2008 Musician Anna-Mari Kähärä
- 2009 Dancer Johanna Keinänen and dancer Liisa Ruuskanen
- 2010 Musician Paula Vesala

=== Other former students of the high school ===
- Pentti Kotiranta
- Jenni Vartiainen
