= Ihmisten edessä (song) =

Single by Jenni Vartiainen

from the album Ihmisten edessä
- Released: 5 September 2007
- Genre: Pop
- Length: 3:32
- Label: Warner Music Finland
- Songwriter: Teemu Brunila

Jenni Vartiainen singles chronology
"Tunnoton" (2007)	"Ihmisten edessä" (2007)	"En haluu kuolla tänä yönä" (2010)

Music video
- "Ihmisten edessä" on YouTube

"Ihmisten edessä" (English: In Front of People) is a Finnish-language pop song by Finnish pop singer Jenni Vartiainen. It was released by Warner Music Finland on 5 September 2007 as the second single from her eponymous debut album Ihmisten edessä.

Written by Teemu Brunila, the lyrics to "Ihmisten edessä" talk about a couple's struggles with showing their romantic affection in public. The music video depicts the couple as two females, though Vartiainen, when interviewed by City magazine, said the song could be about any couple whose love is not accepted by the surrounding society. In 2008, Seta, the main Finnish LGBT organization, awarded Vartiainen and Brunila with its annual award, Asiallisen tiedon omena (the "Apple of Objective Information"), for the song. According to Seta, the piece is "an apposite evocation of the courage needed from LGBT people e.g. to hold hands in public".

"Ihmisten edessä" debuted at number 20 on the Finnish Singles Chart and peaked at number two on its fourth week, while charting for 33 weeks. The single topped the Download Chart on its seventh week. "Ihmisten edessä" has sold platinum in Finland with over 16,000 copies to date, was the sixth-best-selling single of 2008 and ranks currently 66th on the list of the best-selling singles of all time in the country.

== Track listing ==
- Digital download

No.	Title	Length
1.	"Ihmisten edessä" (In Front of people)	3:32

== Charts and certifications ==
=== Weekly charts ===
Chart (2007)	Peak position
Finland (Suomen virallinen lista)	2

=== Year-end charts ===
Chart (2007)	Position
Finland (Suomen virallinen lista)	24
Chart (2008)	Position
Finland (Suomen virallinen lista)	6

=== Certifications ===
Region	Certification	Certified units/sales
Finland (Musiikkituottajat)	Platinum	16,547

== See also ==
- List of best-selling singles in Finland
