= Duran Duran (song) =

Promotional single by Jenni Vartiainen

from the album Seili
- Released: 13 December 2010
- Genre: Pop
- Length: 3:53
- Label: Warner Music Finland
- Songwriter: Teemu Brunila

"Duran Duran" is a Finnish-language song by Finnish singer Jenni Vartiainen, released as the first promotional single of her second studio album Seili on 13 December 2010 by Warner Music Finland. The song is written by Teemu Brunila. "Duran Duran" peaked at number 10 on the Finnish Singles Charts in February 2011 and has sold gold in Finland with over 5,400 copies.

== Charts and certifications ==
=== Weekly charts ===
Chart (2011)	Peak position
Finland (Suomen virallinen lista)	10

=== Certifications ===
Region	Certification	Certified units/sales
Finland (Musiikkituottajat)	Gold	5,474
