= Kari Tapio =

Finnish singer (1945–2010)

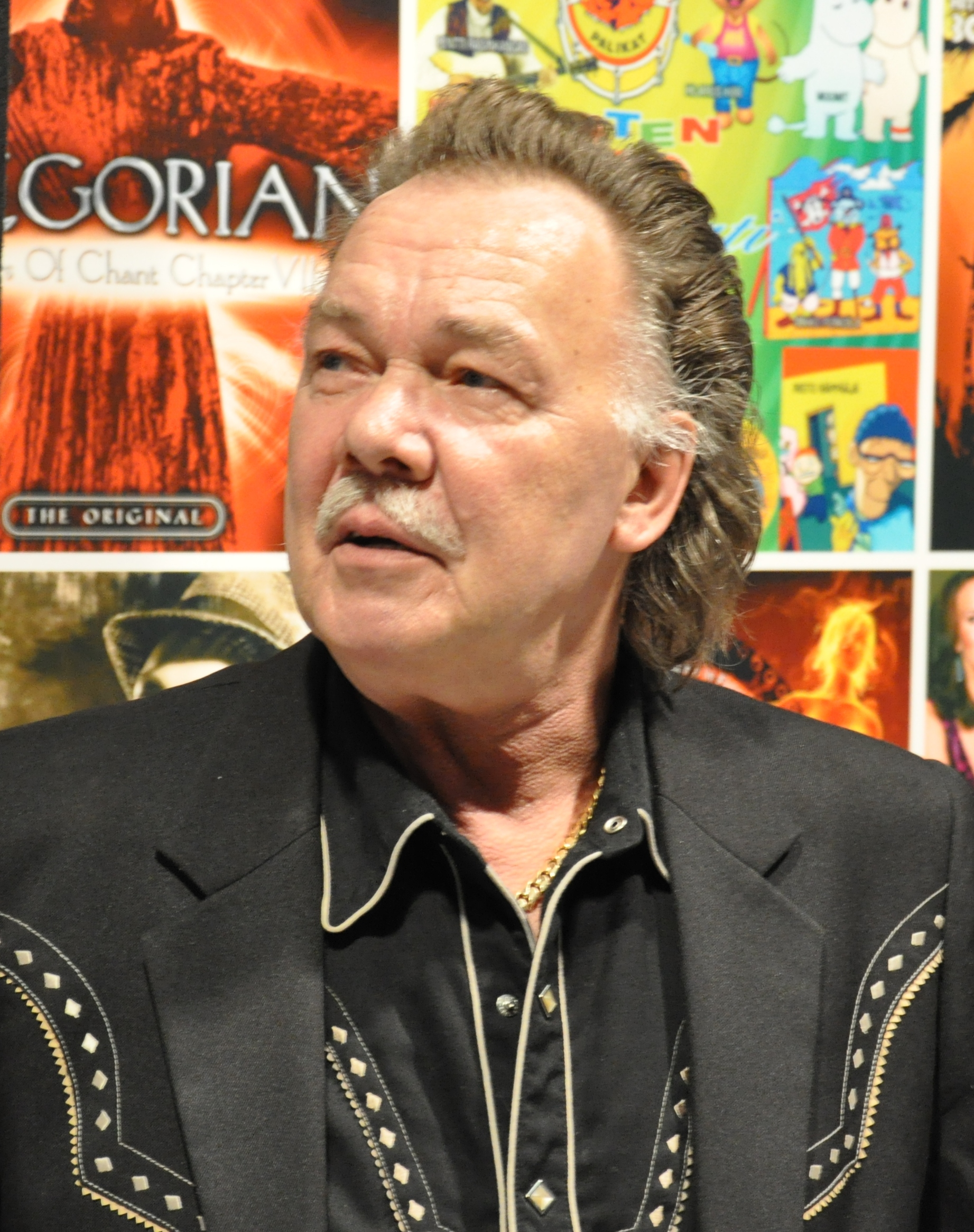
- Kari Tapio (2009)

Background information
- Born: Kari Tapani Jalkanen; November 22, 1945; Suonenjoki, Finland
- Died: December 7, 2010 (aged 65) Espoo, Finland
- Genres: schlager; country and western
- Occupations: musician; songwriter
- Instruments: vocals; guitar
- Years active: 1960-2010
- Spouse: Brita Kyllikki "Pia" Viheriävaara (married 1969-2010)

Kari Tapio and Pia Viheriävaara in 1997

Kari Tapani Jalkanen (22 November 1945 – 7 December 2010), better known by his stage name Kari Tapio, was a Finnish schlager and country & western singer. During his career, he was the most popular singer in Finland for decades; having sold estimately over a million certified records (during his career and posthumously), he is the best-selling soloist in the country. Kari Tapio was born in Suonenjoki, Finland. In the 1960s he performed in his home town Pieksämäki with the local bands ER-Quartet and Jami & The Noisemakers. In 1966 he took singing lessons from Ture Ara.

After Kari Tapio's first single "Tuuli kääntyköön"/"Niskavuoren nuorimmainen" in 1972, he performed in Ilkka "Danny" Lipsanen's show. In the beginning his role was to take care of the snake that was used in the show. Before music became a job for him, he worked as a typesetter in a printing house.

In 1976 Kari Tapio finally broke through with his single Laula kanssain (literally "Sing with Me", a Finnish cover of Jackpot's Sing My Love Song), which was followed by Viisitoista kesää ("Fifteen Summers," a cover of Living Next Door to Alice) and Kaipuu ("Longing", a cover of Mort Shuman's Sorrow). In later years Olen suomalainen ("I Am a Finn", a cover of Toto Cutugno's L'Italiano), Myrskyn jälkeen ("After the Storm"), En pyydä paljon ("I Don't Ask for Much", a cover of Paulina Rubio's Te Quise Tanto) and Paalupaikka ("Pole Position"), among others, were among his most popular songs. In 2003 the Iskelmä-Finlandia award was given to him.

Many of Kari Tapio's songs have influences from country music. He sang many Finnish versions of the songs of Johnny Cash, Waylon Jennings, and Kris Kristofferson.

Kari Tapio was one of the candidates to represent Finland in the Eurovision Song Contest 2008 with the song Valaise yö ("Light up the night"). In the finals, he placed second; and Teräsbetoni was chosen to represent Finland.

Kari Tapio was married to Brita Kyllikki "Pia" Viheriävaara (1947-2015) since 1969, and they have three sons: Jiri (b.1970), Jani (b.1972) and Joona (b.1978). Jiri and Jani played in Kari's band, while Joona was Kari's manager.

Kari Tapio died of a sudden heart attack in the yard of his home in Haukilahti, Espoo, Finland on the 7th of December 2010. He had been out celebrating the Finnish Independence Day the previous night, and had fallen asleep in the backseat of a taxi bringing him home. He was 65 years old. Kari Tapio had already had a heart attack in summer of 1996, and had gone through a bypass surgery in January 1997. His memorial concert was held in Tampere on 18th of October 2011.

== Discography ==
=== Albums ===
- Aikapommi (1974) (with Erkki Liikanen)
- Nostalgiaa (1976)
- Klabbi (1976)
- Kaipuu (1977)
- Kari Tapio (1979)
- Jää vierellein (1981)
- Olen suomalainen (1983)
- Ovi elämään (1984)
- Osa minusta (1986)
- Elämän viulut (1987)
- Tää kaipuu (1988)
- Aikaan täysikuun (1990)
- Yön tuuli vain (1992)
- Sinitaikaa (1993)
- Laulaja (1994)
- Myrskyn jälkeen (1995) #23
- Meren kuisketta (1997) #9
- Sinut tulen aina muistamaan (1998) #7
- Valoon päin (1999) #5
- Bella Capri (2000) #6
- Kari Tapio konserttilavalla (2001) #30
- Joulun tarina (2001)
- Juna kulkee (2003) #4
- Toiset on luotuja kulkemaan (2004) #5
- Paalupaikka (2005) #5
- Kuin taivaisiin (2007) #1
- Kaksi maailmaa (March 26, 2008)
- Viimeiseen pisaraan (March 25, 2009)
- Vieras paratiisissa (May 5, 2010)

=== Compilations ===
- 28 suosituinta levytystä (1987)
- Toivotut (1992)
- Viisitoista kesää (1995)
- 20 suosikkia – Olen suomalainen (1995)
- 20 suosikkia – Luoksesi Tukholmaan (1997)
- Parhaat (1997)
- Kaikki parhaat (1999) #2
- 20 suosikkia – Kulkurin kyyneleet (2001)
- 20 suosikkia – Sanoit liian paljon (2001)
- Kaikkien aikojen parhaat – 40 klassikkoa (2002) #17
- Nostalgia (2005)
- Lauluja rakkaudesta (2006) #13
- Laulaja 1945-2010 (2011) #1

== See also ==
- List of best-selling music artists in Finland
