= Petri Nygård =

Finnish rapper (born 1974)

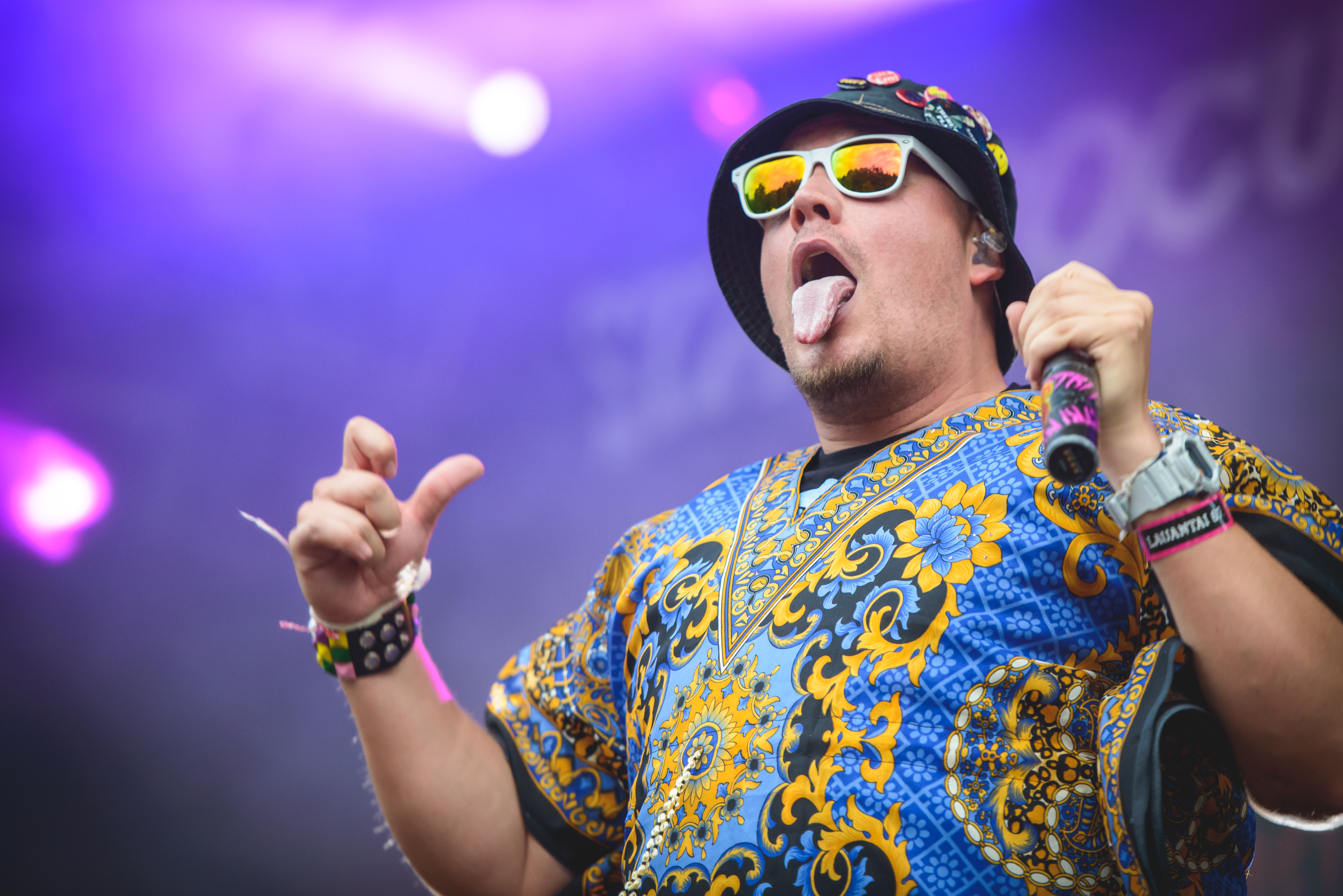
- Nygård in 2013

Background information
- Also known as: Dream; Travis Bicle
- Born: Petri Jukka Mikael Laurila; February 1974 (age 52); Kristianstad, Sweden
- Genres: Hip hop; dirty rap; comedy hip hop; pop-rap; hip house; crunk
- Occupations: Rapper; singer
- Website: petrinygard.com

Petri Jukka Mikael Laurila (born February 1974), better known by his stage name Petri Nygård, is a Finnish rapper and singer. He is also known under alias Dream (in rap duo Nuera) and as Travis Bicle.

He has gained notoriety for his sexually explicit and misogynistic lyrics and his provocative stage shows (which often include nude women, pyrotechnics, drunk fans and giant inflatable vagina sculptures). His lyrical themes often focus on alcohol, parties, sex, women, pornography, hangover, masturbation, dissing Finnish celebrities and satirizing popculture and phenomena.

== Early life ==
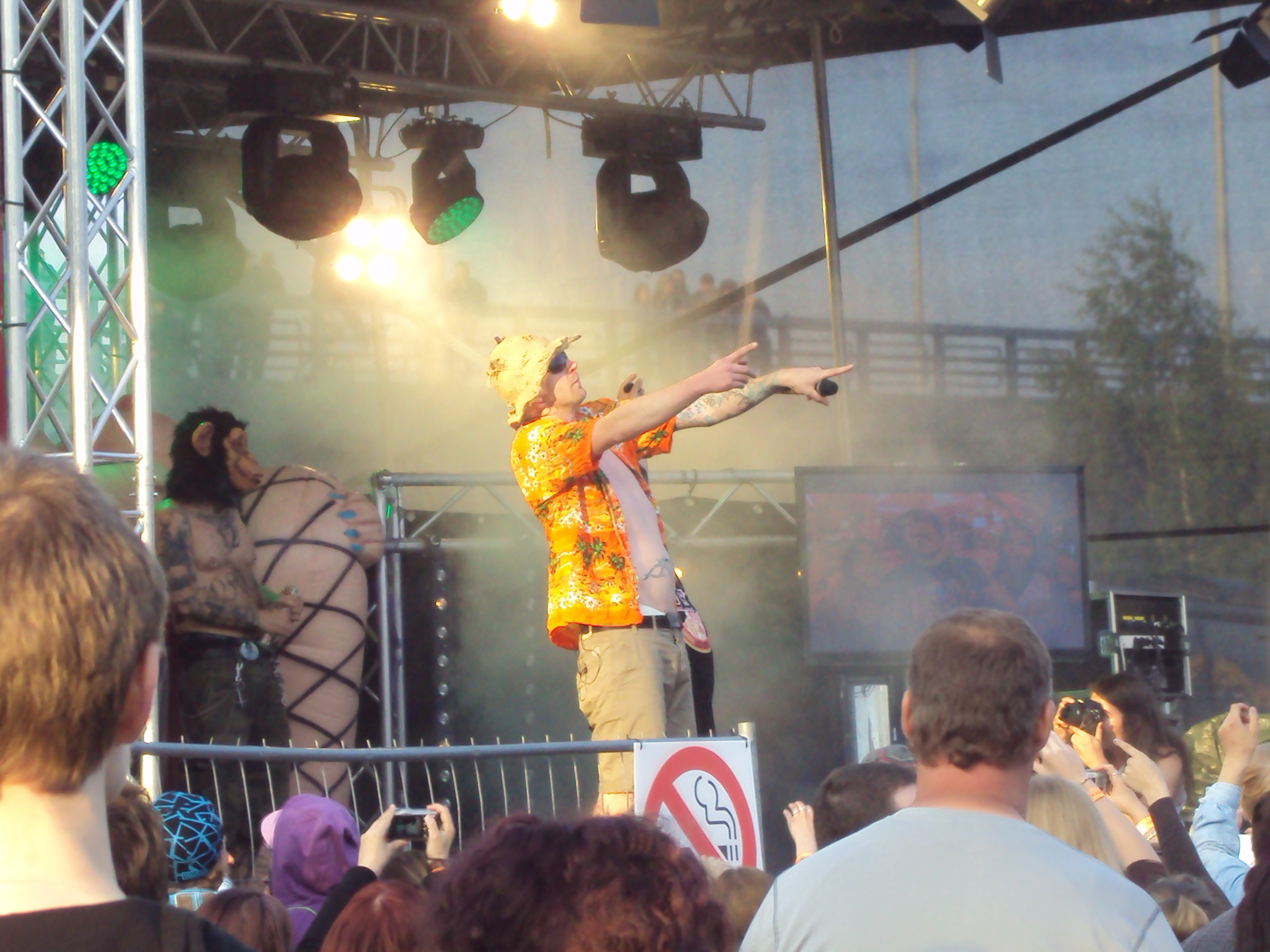
Nygård at Sataman Yö Festival in Jyväskylä.

Laurila is of Sweden-Finnish origin: he was born in Kristianstad, Sweden, to Finnish parents and spent his childhood in Sweden. After serving briefly in the army, he moved to Chicago and eventually to Finland, residing in Tampere and Helsinki. He found initial success in his online release Vitun Suomirokki in 2000 on Poko Rekords going platinum with sales of 17,000 copies. The follow-up single entitled "Kanava Nolla (antakaa mun olla)" was also successful selling 9,000 copies. His debut studio album Mun levy! went gold with sale of 25,000 copies.

== Nuera ==
Nuera
- Origin: Finland
- Genre: Rap
- Years active: 1992–2003
- Past members: Dream (Petri Laurila); Skem (Henry Kaprali)

Laurila started his career as part of the rap duo Nuera. He was known as an MC under the alias Dream whereas his partner in the band was Henry Kaprali known as Skem. They were active in the 1990s releasing several cassettes through Open Records. They also collaborated with other artists on the record label.

In 2004, both Dream and Skem joined DJ K2 in YleX weekly radio show featuring rap and R&B artists.

== Travis Bicle ==
The duo disbanded as Henry Kaprali (Skem) moved to New York City going into music production with Turnin' Records.

As for Laurila (Dream), he took a new alias, Travis Bicle, and released an album in 2007 entitled Committed produced by Kapralin and Turnin' Records.

== Solo as Petri Nygård ==
Laurila continued with a successful rap career taking the name Petri Nygård. After the successes of 2000 and 2001, he has had a considerable comeback starting 2009 with new download only releases. He also released in 2009 a full studio album entitled Kaikkee pitää olla. His next album, Kaikki tai ei mitään, was released in February 2011. The single from the album included the November 2010 single "Sarvet esiin" featuring Finnish thrash metal band Mokoma. The second single entitled "Selvä päivä" featuring Lord Est has shot to #1 on Suomen virallinen lista, the official Finnish singles chart.

== Discography ==
=== Albums ===
with Nuera

- 1992: Nuera (tape)
- 1993: Nuera demo
- 1993: Nuera Underground tape
- 1994: Breakfast
- 1996: Nuera (EP)
- 2000: Honesty
- 2003: Own World

as Travis Bicle

- 2007: Committed

Solo

- 2000: Pillumagneetti (EP)
- 2000: Mun levy!
- 2001: Petri presidentixi
- 2002: Hovinarrin paluu!
- 2009: Kaikkee pitää olla
- 2011: Kaikki tai ei mitään
- 2012: Mun mielestä
- 2012: 29 Syntiä - Kaikki vitun hitit
- 2013: Valmis mihin vaan
- 2020: Alaston Suåmi

=== Singles ===
with Nuera

- 2001: "Upsteps"
- 2003: "Upsteps Reprise"

Solo

- 2000: "Vitun suomirokki"
- 2000: "Kanava nolla (Antakaa mun olla)"
- 2000: "Rääväsuu"
- 2000: "Hulluna tisseihin"
- 2001: "Petri hallitsee liigaa"
- 2001: "Riimini rupiset / Sika / Petri pelastaa joulun"
- 2009: "Sanon suoraan" (download only)
- 2009: "Onko sulla pokkaa?" (download only)
- 2009: "Mitävittuuvaan / Tuska" (download only)
- 2010: "Kippis kulaus" (download only)
- 2010: "Seopetriii" featuring Emel & Aajee (download only)
- 2010: "Sarvet esiin" featuring Mokoma
- 2010: "Selvä päivä" featuring Lord Est
- 2011: "Villi ja vitun vapaa"
- 2012: "Märkää"

Featured in

- 2011: "Reggaerekka" (Lord Est feat. Petri Nygård)
