= Jenni Vartiainen =

Finnish pop singer (born 1983)

- Jenni Vartiainen at Narinkkatori in 2017

Background information
- Born: Jenni Mari Vartiainen; 20 March 1983 (age 43); Kuopio, Finland
- Genres: Synthpop, dance-pop, folk
- Occupation: singer
- Instruments: Vocals, piano, Western concert flute, kantele, organ
- Years active: 2002–present
- Label: Warner Music Finland
- Formerly of: Gimmel
- Website: www.jennivartiainen.fi

Jenni Mari Vartiainen (born 20 March 1983) is a Finnish pop singer. Before her professional musical endeavours, she was a figure skater in her teenage years and attended the Kuopio Senior High of Music and Dance. Vartiainen rose to publicity by winning the Finnish talent show Popstars in October 2002 with Susanna Korvala, Ushma Karnani (currently Olava) and Jonna Pirinen. The four formed the band Gimmel that released three studio albums, sold over 160,000 records and received three Emma Awards, accolades for outstanding achievements in music, awarded by the Finnish music industry federation, Musiikkituottajat. The band broke up in October 2004.

After Gimmel, Vartiainen launched her solo career, releasing her debut single "Tunnoton" in April 2007. In September of the same year, the single was followed by her debut album Ihmisten edessä, which peaked at number six on the Finnish Albums Chart, and its eponymous second single, both of which sold gold in Finland with over 65,000 and 16,000 copies, respectively. In late March 2010, Jenni Vartiainen released her second studio album Seili, after the arrival of its gold-selling debut single "En haluu kuolla tänä yönä". The second album debuted at number one on the Albums Chart, while charting non-consecutively for over a year, and went on to sell over 150,000 copies (septuple platinum), becoming the best-selling album of 2010 in Finland; and ranking 14th in the list of all-time best-sellers in Finland. A combination of pop and ballads, Seili spawned another gold-selling single in August 2010, "Missä muruseni on", which dominated the top-three spots of the Finnish Singles Chart all the way to early 2011, and the gold-selling promotional single "Duran Duran". Vartiainen's third studio album, Terra, released in October 2013, debuted at number one and sold triple platinum with over 62,000 copies.

Jenni Vartiainen has sold over 330,000 certified records in Finland during her solo career, which places her among the 50 best-selling recording artists of all time in the country. She has also received nine Emma Awards.

== Early life ==
Jenni Mari Vartiainen was born on 20 March 1983 in Kuopio. She started to play classical piano at the age of six and she played it until she was 16, building her musical skills later on by attending Kuopio Senior High of Music and Dance. In her teenage years, Vartiainen was also a figure skater, competing ultimately at Finland's senior level alongside future top Finnish skaters such as Susanna Pöykiö. In the summer of 1999, when she was 16, she was injured during a skating lesson and she developed a spinal disc herniation due to which she had to quit skating. In the spring of 2002, Vartiainen completed her matriculation examination at the Senior High and moved to Helsinki. She was about to travel abroad, but her plans changed as she saw an advertisement of Popstars, the first Finnish season of the New Zealand-based casting show format.

== Career ==
=== 2002–2004: Gimmel ===
In the autumn of 2002, Vartiainen entered Popstars. When interviewed by the magazine City in October 2007, she said she was not very seriously participating in the contest and that it was a "half accident", which led her to "finding herself". Along with Ushma Karnani (currently Olava), Susanna Korvala and Jonna Pirinen, she won the contest in October and the quartet formed the band Gimmel. However, Jonna Pirinen left the band after two weeks. Gimmel's debut single "Etsit muijaa seuraavaa" sold gold with over 17,000 copies in 2002, placing in the top 70 of the best-selling singles of all time in Finland. The band's debut album Lentoon (2002) debuted at number one on the Albums Chart, sold multi-platinum with over 98,000 copies and was the best-selling album of 2002 in Finland. With Lentoon, the band won three Emma Awards in 2003: for New Pop/Rock Artist of the Year, Debut Album of the Year and Best-Selling Album of the Year. The second album Kaksi kertaa enemmän (2003) peaked at number two on the Albums Chart and managed to sell platinum with over 50,000 copies, but the third album Pisaroita ja kyyneleitä (2004), debuting at number three on the chart, charted for only six weeks and did not exceed the gold limit. During the Gimmel era, Vartiainen studied psychology at an open university. In the 2007 interview with City, she said that Risto Asikainen, who wrote songs for the band, did not allow the trio inside the studio so that "they would not boss around". Vartiainen thought the decision was right, saying "three different girls have so different opinions" and adding that they were "newbies who knew nothing about anything". Vartiainen also considered Gimmel "a face to other people's project", saying that they could not focus on the content because they did not have time for that. In an August 2010 interview with Me Naiset, Vartiainen said that she also learned from Gimmel "how it feels like when records don't sell and there are only ten people at a gig", adding that "an artist has to develop all the time and work like a maniac".

=== 2005–2008: Ihmisten edessä ===
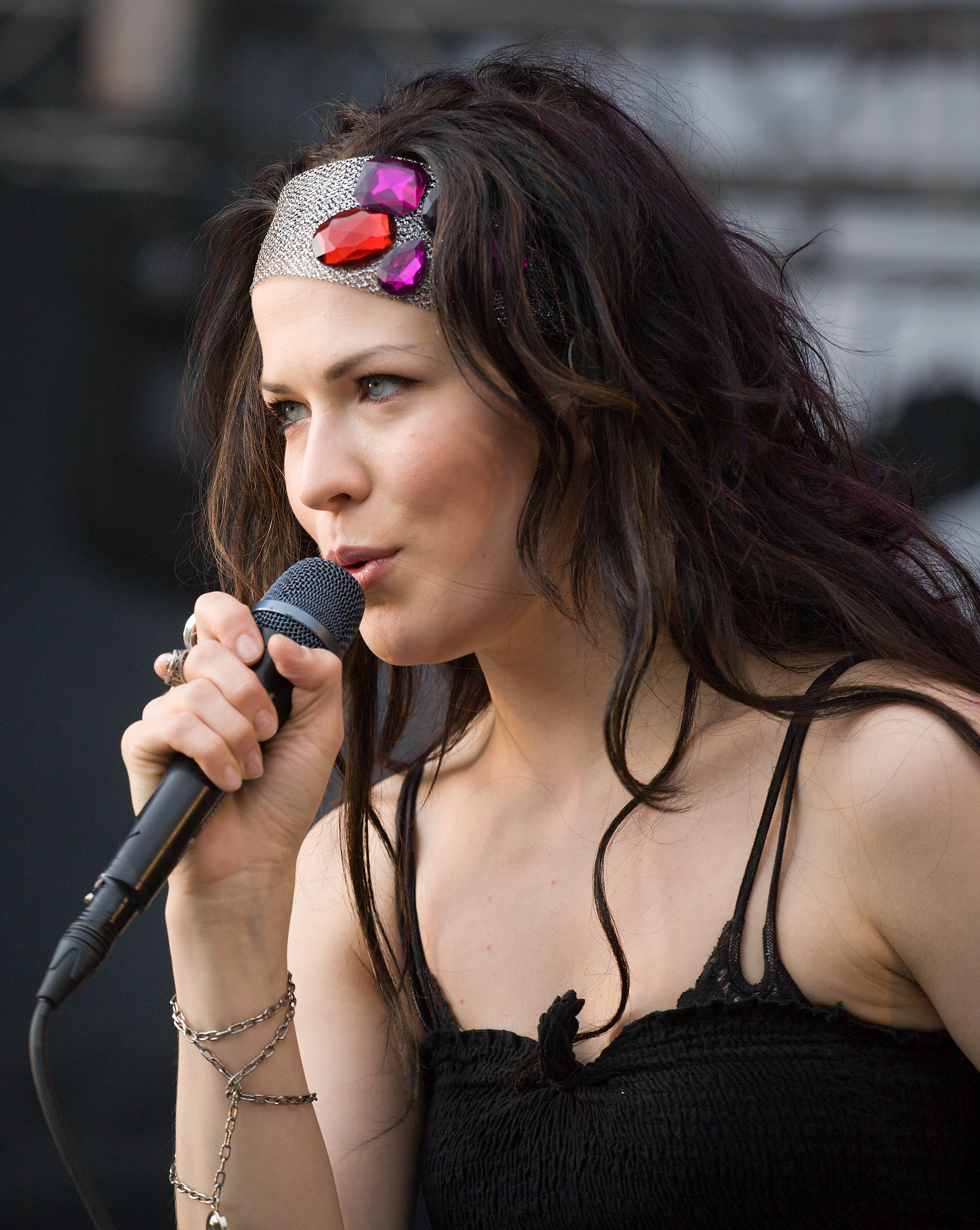
Jenni Vartiainen in 2008.

In 2005, Vartiainen signed a record deal with Warner Music Finland. The production of her debut album together with producer Jukka Immonen took so long that Vartiainen ran out of money, which led her to ask for cleaning jobs at Warner studios and ultimately she worked at a company, processing consumer complaints. Vartiainen's first solo single "Tunnoton" was released in April 2007 and the debut album Ihmisten edessä in September 2007. The album spawned two later singles, "Ihmisten edessä" and "Mustaa kahvia", of which "Ihmisten edessä", dealing with difficulties faced by LGBT people, was the biggest hit, peaking at number two on the Singles Chart and selling gold with over 16,000 copies. Vartiainen received the Seta's price for the song in 2008. Selling over 61,000 copies and peaking at number six on the Albums Chart, her debut album went on to reach the Finnish double-platinum certification. Vartiainen was on the magazine cover for the December 2007 edition of the Finnish Cosmopolitan and the March 2008 edition of the Mexican Cosmopolitan. With Ihmisten edessä and its title track, Vartiainen won the Award for Debut Album of the Year and Song of the Year at the 2008 Emma Awards and the album was nominated for Pop Album of the Year.

=== 2010–2012: Seili ===
Vartiainen's second album Seili was released in March 2010 and it charted for 62 non-consecutive weeks on the Albums Chart—with 15 weeks at number one—and sold over 150,000 copies (multi-platinum), becoming the best-selling album of 2010 in Finland with sales of 95,000 copies in that year and the 14th-best-selling of all time in the country. Three singles were released from Seili, "En haluu kuolla tänä yönä", "Nettiin" and "Missä muruseni on" along with two promotional singles, "Duran Duran" and "Eikö kukaan voi meitä pelastaa?". "En haluu kuolla tänä yönä" and "Missä muruseni on" sold both platinum with over 11,000 copies and 18,000 copies, respectively, while "Duran Duran" sold gold with over 5,400 copies. "Missä muruseni on" was also the major chart hit from the album, topping the Singles Chart in its fourth week and staying atop for 11 weeks in 2010 and 2011. Met with mixed to positive critiques, on the one hand for its vocals and combination of pop and dark piano ballads, on the other hand for lack of peculiarity, the album and its singles earned Vartiainen a record-breaking seven Emma Awards in February 2011; the Awards for Female Soloist of the Year, Live Performer of the Year, Album of the Year, Pop/Rock Album of the Year, Best-Selling Album of the Year, Song of the Year ("En haluu kuolla tänä yönä") and Music Video of the Year ("Missä muruseni on"). In addition, her producer Jukka Immonen won the Award for Producer of the Year. "Dumbfounded" by her success with Seili, she said in an interview at the Emma Awards that "the way music starts to live its completely own life in the audience after being produced", makes her feel humble. Vartiainen was also nominated for Best Finnish Act at the 2010 MTV Europe Music Awards. Amid her busy concert tour around Finland in the spring of 2011, she denied some tabloid rumors that she would have canceled interviews due to stress and exhaustion. In May 2011, she announced she would take a long break after her upcoming summer concerts, to relax and prepare for a new album. Vartiainen's last concert before the break took place on the Main Stage at the Finnish National Theatre in Helsinki on August 28, with the specialty that the concert was broadcast live at Finnkino film theaters in 11 other localities around Finland, for the first time in the history of the theater. The tickets to the concert were sold out within a couple of hours. Due to technical difficulties, the concert could not be broadcast in Lahti and Kuopio. In an August 2011 interview with the radio station Iskelmä, Vartiainen said she was planning to spend her touring break by graduating as a singing teacher by August 2012—which she did in May 2013. In late January 2012, Vartiainen was about to perform briefly at a fundraising concert for the presidential campaign of the Green League's Pekka Haavisto, but she was forced to cancel due to high fever and gastroenteritis.

=== 2013–present: Terra ===
After a two-year break, Warner Music Finland announced in August 2013 that Vartiainen would release her third studio album, Terra, on 4 October 2013, preceded by its lead single "Junat ja naiset" on 16 August. The lead single peaked at number 15 and the album debuted at number one on the Official Finnish Charts. Vartiainen embarked on her new concert tour promoting the album on November 1.

== Personal life ==
Jenni Vartiainen, who is known for keeping a very low profile on her private life, was reported on 28 March 2009 to have started a cohabitation with her producer Jukka Immonen. Since May 2008, She has had a Pumi dog named Urho Kepponen. In August 2008, Vartiainen bought an apartment worth €400,000 in Laajasalo neighborhood in Helsinki. During the summer of 2011, Vartiainen was a subject of pregnancy rumors in the media, due to her loose concert outfits, a slightly more rounded belly and the post-summer break the length of which was not specified. Vartiainen's spokesperson Carla Ahonius stated on the rumors to MTV3 that "the record label has nothing to report on the issue" and that "[Vartiainen] will comment on the subject on Facebook if necessary". In September 2014, news broke that Vartiainen and Immonen had separated. In 2019, Vartiainen moved to New York City.

The relatively successful career has accrued Vartiainen's wealth—she earned almost €71,000 in 2008, €47,000 in 2009 and €64,000 in 2010 The success of Seili further increased her wealth, as she earned nearly €200,000 in 2011 and €135,000 in 2012.

== Discography ==
- Ihmisten edessä (2007)
- Seili (2010)
- Terra (2013)
- Monologi (2018)
- Origo (2025)

== Awards and nominations ==
=== Emma Awards ===
Year	Nominee / work	Award	Result
2008	Ihmisten edessä	Emma Award for Debut Album of the Year	Won
2008	Ihmisten edessä	Emma Award for Pop Album of the Year	Nominated
2008	"Ihmisten edessä"	Emma Award for Song of the Year	Won
2011	Jenni Vartiainen	Emma Award for Female Soloist of the Year	Won
2011	Jenni Vartiainen	Emma Award for Live Performer of the Year	Won
2011	Seili	Emma Award for Album of the Year	Won
2011	Seili	Emma Award for Pop/Rock Album of the Year	Won
2011	Seili	Emma Award for Best-Selling Album of the Year	Won
2011	"En haluu kuolla tänä yönä"	Emma Award for Song of the Year	Won
2011	"Missä muruseni on"	Emma Award for Music Video of the Year	Won
2013	Jenni Vartiainen	Emma Award for Female Soloist of the Year	Nominated
2013	Terra	Emma Award for Album of the Year	Nominated
2013	Terra	Emma Award for Pop Album of the Year	Nominated

=== MTV Europe Music Awards ===
Year	Nominee / work	Award	Result
2010	Jenni Vartiainen	MTV Europe Music Award for Best Finnish Act	Nominated

== See also ==
- List of best-selling music artists in Finland
