= Emma Gaala =

Finnish music award ceremony

The Emma Gaala (Finnish: Emma-gaala) is a Finnish music gala arranged yearly by Musiikkituottajat (IFPI Finland), presenting the Emma Awards to the most distinguished artists and music professionals of the year. It has been arranged annually since 1983, except between 1988 and 1990. The accolades are often referred to as the Finnish equivalent of the American Grammy Awards.

Until 1991, the winners were selected by representatives of IFPI Finland, formerly known as ÄKT. From 1992 onward they have only selected the candidates, from which a board of music critics has selected the winners. The selection criteria include interesting musical merit, musical and commercial success in the recording industry, and the artists' popularity measured in different ways.

== Award categories ==
Current categories include:

- Artist of the Year
- Band of the Year
- Rookie of the Year
- Pop of the Year
- Rock of the Year
- Rap of the Year
- Hit of the Year
- Ethno of the Year
- Jazz of the Year
- Classic of the Year
- Metal of the Year
- Producer of the Year
- Musician of the Year
- Critics' Choice
- Album of the Year
- Song of the Year
- Alternative of the Year
- Special Emma
- Golden Emma
- Export Emma
- Most Streamed Finnish Song of the Year
- Most Streamed International Song of the Year
- Best Selling Album of the Year
- Finnish Artist or Band of the Year (Public Vote)
