= Mariska (rapper) =

Finnish musician (born 1979)

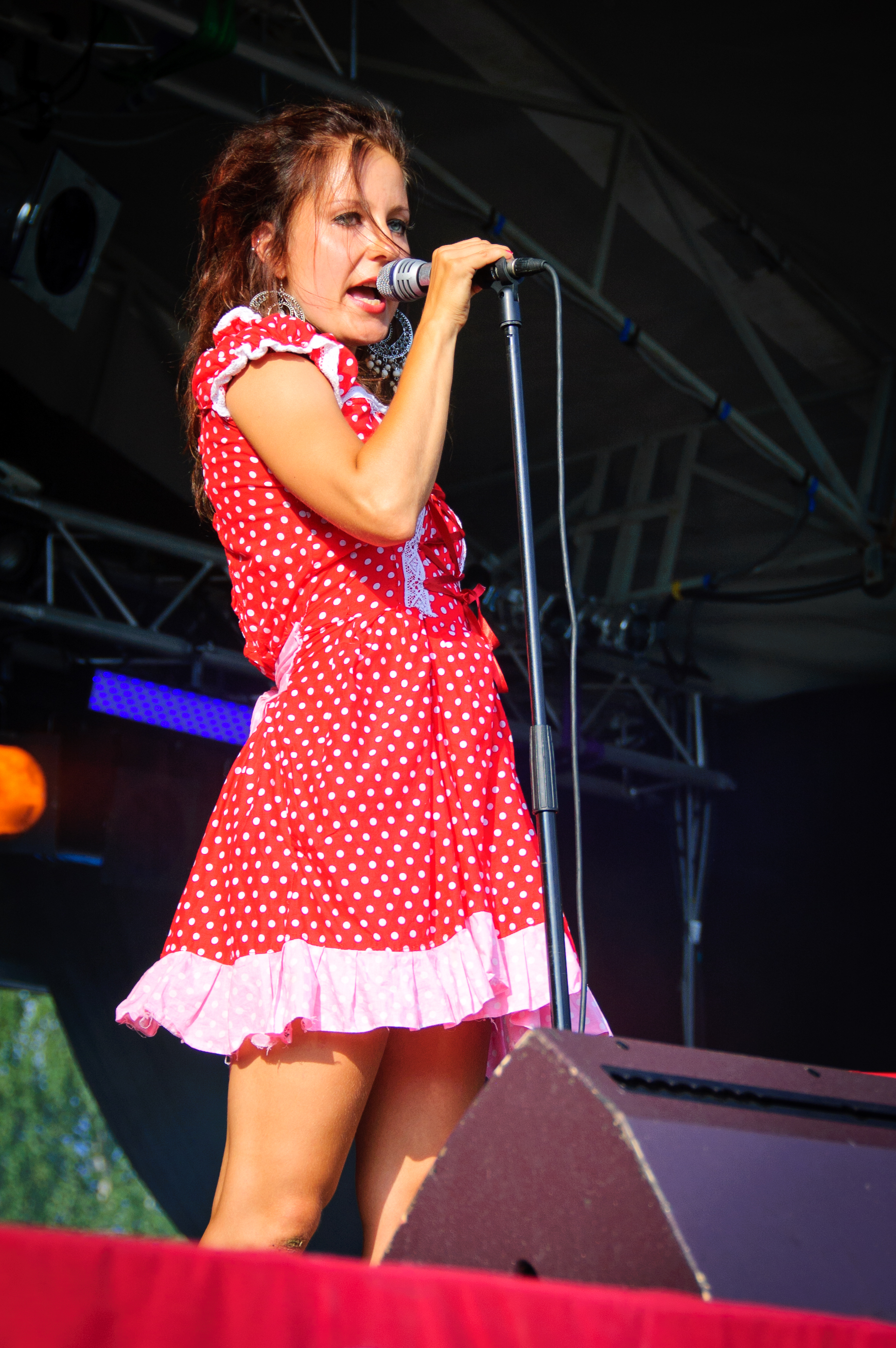
- Mariska in Ilosaarirock 2010

Background information
- Born: Anna Maria Rahikainen; 19 February 1979 (age 47); Helsinki, Finland
- Origin: Helsinki, Finland
- Genres: Rap, hip hop
- Occupations: Singer, songwriter
- Years active: 2002–present
- Label: Warner
- Website: mariska.fi

Anna Maria Rahikainen (born 19 February 1979), better known by her stage name Mariska, is a Finnish rapper, singer and songwriter. She writes her songs by herself, and the lyrics often deal with relationships, male chauvinism and politics.

== Biography ==
Born in Helsinki, Mariska began to play piano in Sibelius-Akatemia at the age of seven. She soon changed her style to punk and joined a punk-band called Oheisvasara. Mariska moved to London in 1998 to study Latin and old Greek in university.

== Career as a rap artist ==
Mariska returned to Finland in 2002 and her first album Toisin sanoen was released the same year. Her second album, Memento mori was released in 2004, and the third, Suden hetki followed in August 2005. The latter two were nominated for Emma Awards.

== Mariska and Pahat Sudet ==
In 2010, Mariska switched genre teaming up with Jaakko Jakku, Klaus Suominen and Luis Herrero. The new formation was named Mariska & Pahat Sudet. The self-titled album Mariska & Pahat Sudet was released in May 2010 and characterized as punk jazz and blues pop spiritual.

In recently dying her hair red Mylène Farmer-style, she enhanced her image for the release of her 2012 album Kukkurukuu, which has thus far spawned the singles "Liekki", "Kukkurukuu" and "Kuolema on kalamies".

== Career as a pop singer ==
After Mariska & Pahat Sudet dissolved in 2013 Mariska began working on her current solo career as a pop singer. She released a single Itserakkausjuttuu in 2015 and the subsequent album Matador in 2016. In 2018, she released a poem collection titled Määt ja Muut – Runoja eläimistä ja ihmisistä and in 2019 her second album as a solo pop singer titled Mariska. In 2020, Mariska participated in the 11th season of popular Finnish music reality show Vain elämää.

== Discography ==
=== Albums ===
Solo

- 2002: Toisin sanoen (In Other Words – FIN #23)
- 2004: Memento mori (FIN #9)
- 2005: Suden hetki (Hour of the Wolf – FIN #11)
- 2016: Matador
- 2019: Mariska
- 2020: Navidadii

as Mariska & Pahat Sudet

- 2010: Mariska & Pahat Sudet (FIN #16)
- 2012: Kukkurukuu (FIN #3)

=== Singles ===
- 2002: "Tarkasta tämä" (Check This Out – FIN #6)
- 2002: "Anteexi/Tee ze/Hiphoptauti" (Sorry/Do It/Hip Hop Disease – FIN #9)
- 2003: "Matematiikkaa" (Mathematics)
- 2004: "Hetken kestää elämää" (Life Is Just for a While – FIN #11)
- 2004: "Murha" (Murder)
- 2005: "Keinu" (Swing)
- 2005: "Sivustakatsoja" (Bystander)
- 2015: "Itserakkausjuttuu"
- 2015: "Sotilaat"
- 2016: "Typötyhjiin"
- 2016: "Entiselle"
- 2019: "Grafeenia"
- 2019: "Muuttumisleikki"
- 2019: "Minä liityin sinuun"
- 2021: "Terveisin Doris"
- 2021: "Pienii fiiliksii"

Mariska & Pahat Sudet singles

- 2010: "Suloinen myrkynkeittäjä" (The Sweet Poison Cooker)
- 2012: "Liekki" (Flame)
- 2012: "Kukkurukuu"
- 2012: "Kuolema on kalamies" (Death Is a Fisherman)

Featured in

- 2010: "Minä" (Kymppilinja featuring Mariska) (Me)
- 2026: "南門町 Näin Määrättiin" (Chthonic featuring Mariska)
