= Wake (Trio Töykeät album) =

Studio album by Trio Töykeät
- Released: 2005
- Genre: Jazz
- Label: Blue Note

Trio Töykeät chronology
High Standards (2003)	Wake (2005)

Wake is a jazz album by the Finnish band Trio Töykeät. It was released in 2005.

The album peaked at number 15 on the Finnish album chart on its debut week, and totaled six weeks on the chart.

== Track listing ==
1. "Perfect Makeout Music"
2. "Voyage"
3. "End of the First Set"
4. "Final Fantasy"
5. "In a Sentimental Mood"
6. "Almost"
7. "Beba"
8. "You and Me"
9. "Third Ball"
10. "Sir Vival"
11. "Insane in Seine"

All songs composed by Iiro Rantala except track 2 by Kenny Barron, track 5 by Duke Ellington, track 8 by Eerik Siikasaari and tracks 6 and 10 by Rami Eskelinen.
