= Felix Zenger =

Finnish musician

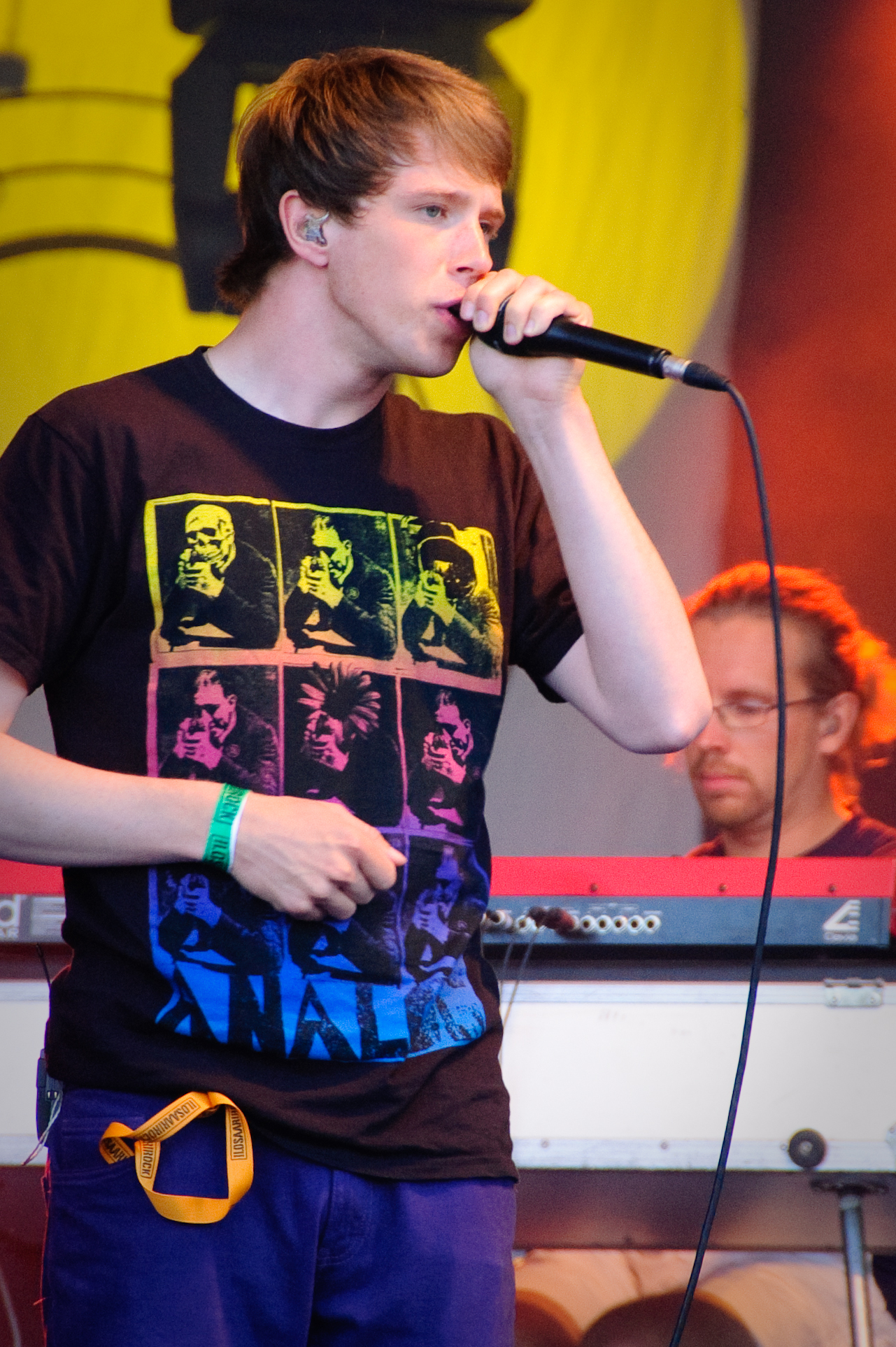
Felix Zenger at Ilosaarirock in 2009

Felix Elmeri Zenger (Born 23 December 1986 in Turku, Finland) is a Finland-Swedish beatboxer and multiple freestyle footbag Finnish champion. Zenger formed the Iiro Rantala New Trio together with Iiro Rantala and Marzi Nyman. Zenger joined the Don Johnson Big Band in 2018.

== Background ==
Zenger was born in Turku on 23 December 1986 but spent his childhood in Kilo, Espoo. Zenger's father is the rector of a musical school and his mother is a teacher of the English and French languages. Felix Zenger is one of the three children in the family. In Espoo Zenger started at the language immersion class at the Revontuli school lower primary school, as his parents wanted their children to learn Swedish. When Zenger was ten years old the family moved to the Vasaramäki district in Turku. Zenger has been practising music and sports since his childhood.

== Footbag freestyle ==
Felix Zenger became familiar with footbag in Turku when the sport was making its way to Finland. According to his own words he became more interested in the sport than his friends did and started practising alone.

Zenger has been competing in the Finnish championships in footbag since 2002 and won a gold medal from 2003 to 2006. He has also participated three times in the world championships from 2003 to 2006. He won a bronze medal in the world championships in 2005, which was also the first medal for Finland in the world championships in freestyle footbag. He also won a bronze medal in the European championships in 2005. He also participated in the European championships in 2003.

Zenger has also participated in other competitions in the sports, such as the circle, 3 trick combo and shred competitions. Of these, he has won four gold medals in the Finnish championships and two in the world championships, two silver medals in the world championships and one bronze medal each in the Finnish, European and world championships.

In 2003 Zenger participated in the Finnish championships in footbag net in the four-player series and won a bronze medal together with his pair Joona Koistinen.

== Music ==
Zenger has played the piano after his parents' recommendation since his childhood. At first, he played classical piano music, but after he went to the Turku Academy of Music, he switched to jazz and rhythmic music. In 2006 Zenger started studying piano playing in the Pop & Jazz Conservatory in Helsinki.

=== Beatboxing ===
Zenger started practising beatboxing at the age of 16. According to his own words, he had never heard the North American pioneers of the genre but instead started mimicking the sounds of different instruments on his own and later also mixed them. Zenger only became familiar with the hip hop music culture through beatboxing.

Zenger has said that one of the reasons he became interested in beatboxing was that he was interested in playing the drums in his childhood but did not want to start practising another instrument along with the piano. Playing the sounds of the drums with his own mouth did not require buying expensive instruments. According to his own words, Zenger can mimic about one thousand different sounds or their combinations.

Zenger has appeared and recorded with many different artists. Among them are hip hop artists such as DJ QBert, Paleface, Giant Robot and Asa, and also other artists such as Pekka Kuusisto, Severi Pyysalo, Rajaton and Kari Tapio. Zenger has also been a regularly featured artist at performances by the Don Johnson Big Band and has appeared on the band's third album. In 2007 Zenger was awarded best artist of the year 2006 at the Funk Awards. In the same year his skills became internationally known when he appeared as part of the introductory performance of the Eurovision Song Contest.

Zenger was a regular member in the Iiro Rantala New Trio which published its first album in 2008, together with Iiro Rantala and Marzi Nyman. The cooperation between Zenger and Rantala started when the rap artist Paleface recommended Zenger to Rantala.

In 2010 Zenger appeared at the Pori Jazz festival when Pharrell Williams of N.E.R.D. suddenly invited him on stage in the middle of their performance. Williams told the audience he had seen Zenger's YouTube videos and become impressed by his skills.

Zenger's first solo album Won't Say a Thing was self-published on 20 April 2011 and was produced by Kari Saarilahti from the Don Johnson Big Band. The album reached place #21 at The Official Finnish Charts. Zenger has been making his own songs since 2007. He also appeared in the Summeri TV show in spring 2011 beatboxing at the Bysis youth café in Oulu.

Giorgio Armani has also requested Zenger's beatboxing in a lipstick commercial. In 2015 Zenger appeared in Indonesia at several clubs and taught at a beatboxing workshop. At the time he appeared at the morning show of the Indonesian TV channel NET together with the band Art of Tree.

=== Discography ===
==== Solo ====
- Won't Say a Thing (self-published, 2011)

==== Iiro Rantala New Trio ====
- Elmo (2008)

==== Don Johnson Big Band ====
- Physical Digital (2018)
