= Kuningas soundi =

Studio album by Nopsajalka
- Released: 25 August 2010
- Language: Finnish
- Label: Monsp Records

Nopsajalka chronology
5 sormee (2009)	Kuningas soundi (2010)	Sun (2014)

Kuningas soundi is the third solo studio album by Finnish musician Nopsajalka. Released on 25 August 2010, the album peaked at number 29 on the Finnish Albums Chart.

== Track listing ==
No.	Title	Length
1.	"Kelei pitelee" (featuring Paha Nuutti)	2:47
2.	"Tervetuloo paratiisiin" (featuring Stig Dogg)	3:26
3.	"Paineet tippuu" (featuring Asa)	3:31
4.	"Hiki pintaa" (featuring Posteljoona)	3:24
5.	"Puu kaatuu"	2:26
6.	"Stereot" (featuring Juno)	3:40
7.	"Superperjantai" (featuring DJ Svengali)	3:53
8.	"Mun minimi" (featuring Paleface)	3:54
9.	"Teet mitä teet" (featuring Juno & Superjanne)	4:20
10.	"Matkamies" (featuring Leijonamieli, Stepa & Are)	4:45

== Charts ==
Chart (2010)	Peak position
Finnish Albums (Suomen virallinen lista)	29

== Release history ==
Region	Date	Format	Label
Finland	25 August 2010	CD	Monsp Records
