= G'day =

G'day may refer to:

- g'day, a greeting in Australian, and New Zealand English
- G'day (album), a 1993 album by Trio Töykeät

== See also ==
- G'day G'day (album), a 1988 album by Slim Dusty
  - "G'day G'day" (song), the title song
- G-Day (disambiguation)
