= GG Caravan =

Finnish rap group

GG Caravan is a Finnish rap and hip-hop group of artists and musicians from various formations. The group is a collective advocating anti-racism through music, concerts, music videos and public awareness campaigns.

The band particularly highlights the plight of the minority Romani (gypsy) people of Finland and promotes a change of attitude towards them and thus the gypsy influence on their music, as GG Caravan mixes various genres including rap, pop, folk music with gypsy music. The variety and diversity of the genres comes from the various influences by the band members and musicians involved in the group.

GG Caravan enjoys the partial financing of the Finnish Ministry of Interior and the European Union Commission.

The band pre-released the single "On se hienoo" in February 2012 in anticipation of the debut album. The single hit the Finnish Singles Chart Top 10, reaching #8. Soon after the self-titled debut album, GG Caravan was launched on 29 February 2012 It was released under the Live Nation Finland label. The album hit #3 on the Finnish Albums Chart on its first week of release.

The group made a comeback in June 2020 with a live concert, which could later be viewed online on Nelonen Ruutu website.

== Members ==
- Redrama
- Paleface (Karri Miettinen)
- Tommy Lindgren
- Brandon (Brandon Bauer)
- Marzi Nyman
- Zarkus Poussa
- Bulle (Joni "Big" Bollström)
- Voli (Jani Tuohimaa)
- Heikki Soini
- Vesa Sade

...and other musicians

and in production

- Tero Roininen
- Samu Wuori

== Discography ==
=== Albums ===
- 2012: GG Caravan (Live Nation Finland label) - reached #3 on Finnish Albums Chart

=== Singles ===
- 2012: ""On se hienoo" (Live Nation Finland label) - reached #8 on Finnish Singles Chart
- 2020: "Viimenen Puunoksa (feat. Paleface & Eicca Toppinen)"
