= Tommy Lindgren =

Finnish singer-songwriter (born 1977)

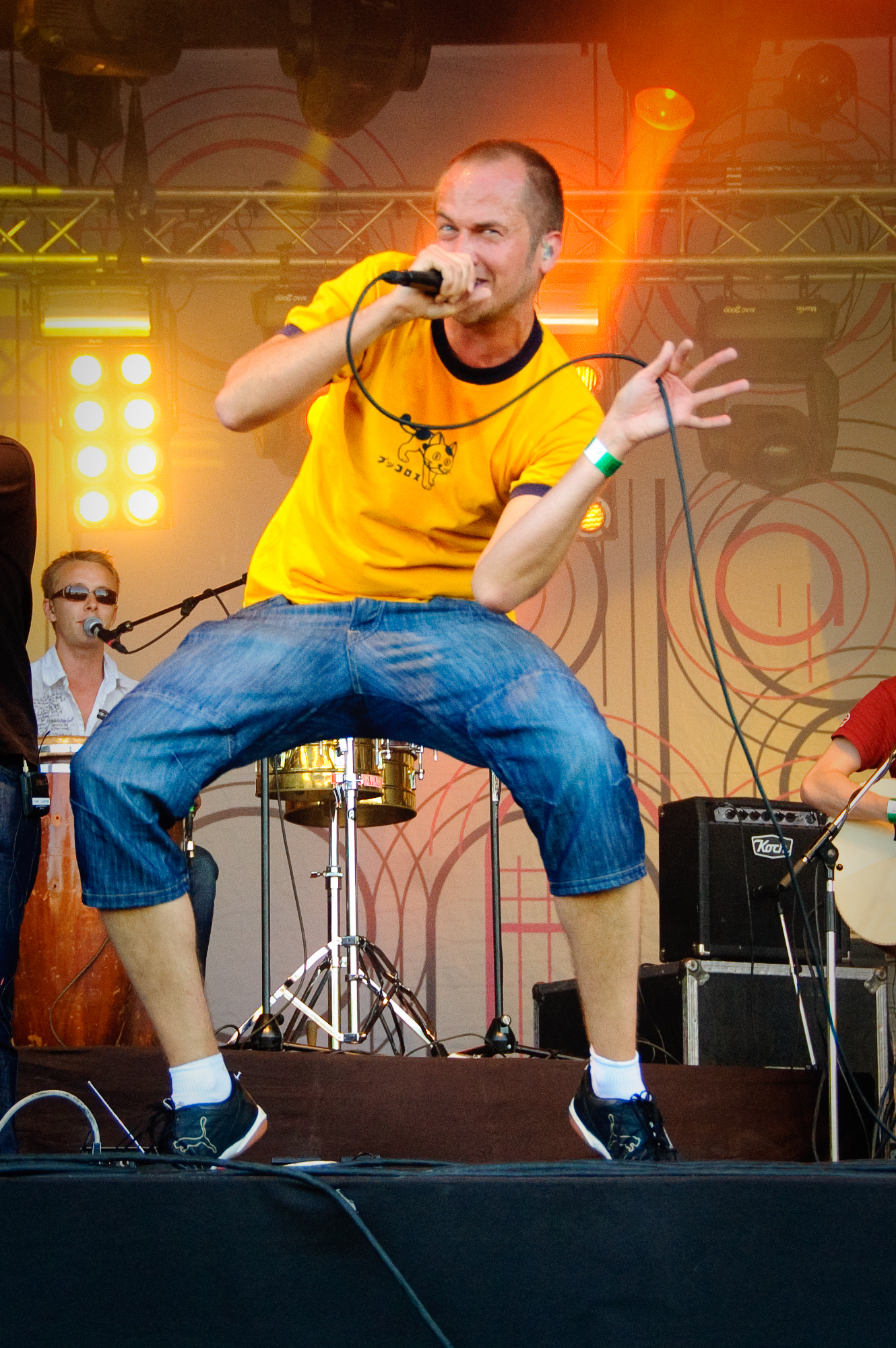
Tommy Lindgren at Ilosaarirock in 2009.

Tommy Lindgren (born 1977) is a Finnish singer-songwriter best known as the vocalist of the band Don Johnson Big Band. Lindgren has also appeared with other ensembles such as GG Caravan and Ricky-Tick Big Band & Julkinen Sana.

An avid human rights activist, Lindgren has also worked as an informer and editorial secretary of the Finnish branch of Amnesty International, and he has been working with the "Dreams" activity of the Finnish Foundation for Children and Youth. Tommy Lindgren's father was Christer Lindgren, a Finnish culinary article editor and writer.

== Discography ==
=== Solo albums ===
- Sininen kaupunki (2016)

=== Don Johnson Big Band ===
==== Studio albums ====
- Support de Microphones (2000)
- Breaking Daylight (2003)
- Don Johnson Big Band (2006)
- Records Are Forever (2009)
- Fiesta (2012)

==== Singles ====
- One MC, One Delay (2003)
- Jah Jah Blow Job (2003)
- Road (2006)
- Busy Relaxin' (2006)
- Private Intentions (2006)
- L.L.H. (2009)
- Running Man (2009)

=== GG Caravan ===
==== Studio albums ====
- GG Caravan (2012)

=== Ricky-Tick Big Band & Julkinen Sana ===
==== Studio albums ====
- Burnaa (2013)
- Korottaa panoksii (2015)
