= Salt water (disambiguation) =

Salt water, saltwater, or saline water is water containing salt.

Salt water or saltwater may also refer to:

== Fluids ==
- Seawater, water from our oceans
- Saline (medicine), medical usage of saline solution

== Film ==
- Saltwater (2000 film), a 2000 film by Conor McPherson
- Saltwater (2012 film), a 2012 film by Charlie Vaughn

== Music ==
- Saltwater, an alias of the German trance group Alphazone
- "Saltwater" (Chicane song), 1999
- "Saltwater" (Julian Lennon song), 1991
- "Salt Water", a song by A Hawk and a Hacksaw from The Way the Wind Blows
- "Salt Water", a song by Blackfield from Blackfield V
- "Salt Water", a song by Don Johnson Big Band from Breaking Daylight
- "Salt Water", a song by Ed Sheeran from -
- "Salt Water", a song by The The from NakedSelf
- Saltwater, an EP by Pianos Become the Teeth
- Saltwater, an album by Dan Michaelson and The Coastguards
- "Saltwater", a song by Beach House from their self-titled album
- "Saltwater", a song by the Cat Empire from Two Shoes
- "Saltwater", a song by Kid Cudi from Free

== See also ==
- Saltwater people(s)
