= Mun (album) =

Studio album by Nopsajalka
- Released: 10 April 2015
- Language: Finnish
- Label: Kuuluuks

Nopsajalka chronology
Sun (2014)	Mun (2015)	Sade (2020)

Mun is the fifth solo studio album by Finnish musician Nopsajalka. The album was released on 10 April 2015.

== Track listing ==
No.	Title	Length
1.	"Niin kuin mä"	4:07
2.	"Onks se liikaa"	3:54
3.	"Graindaa"	3:53
4.	"Prinsessa hienohelma"	2:52
5.	"Hei rakastaja"	3:14
6.	"Vapaapäivä" (featuring Juno)	4:14
7.	"Akti"	2:36
8.	"Jäädä yöks"	3:39
9.	"Päivät & yöt"	4:14
10.	"Eteenpäin"	6:06

== Charts ==
Chart (2015)	Peak position
Finnish Albums (Suomen virallinen lista)	22

== Release history ==
Region	Date	Format	Label
Finland	10 April 2015	CD, digital download	Kuuluuks
