= Juno (rapper) =

Finnish rapper (born 1987)

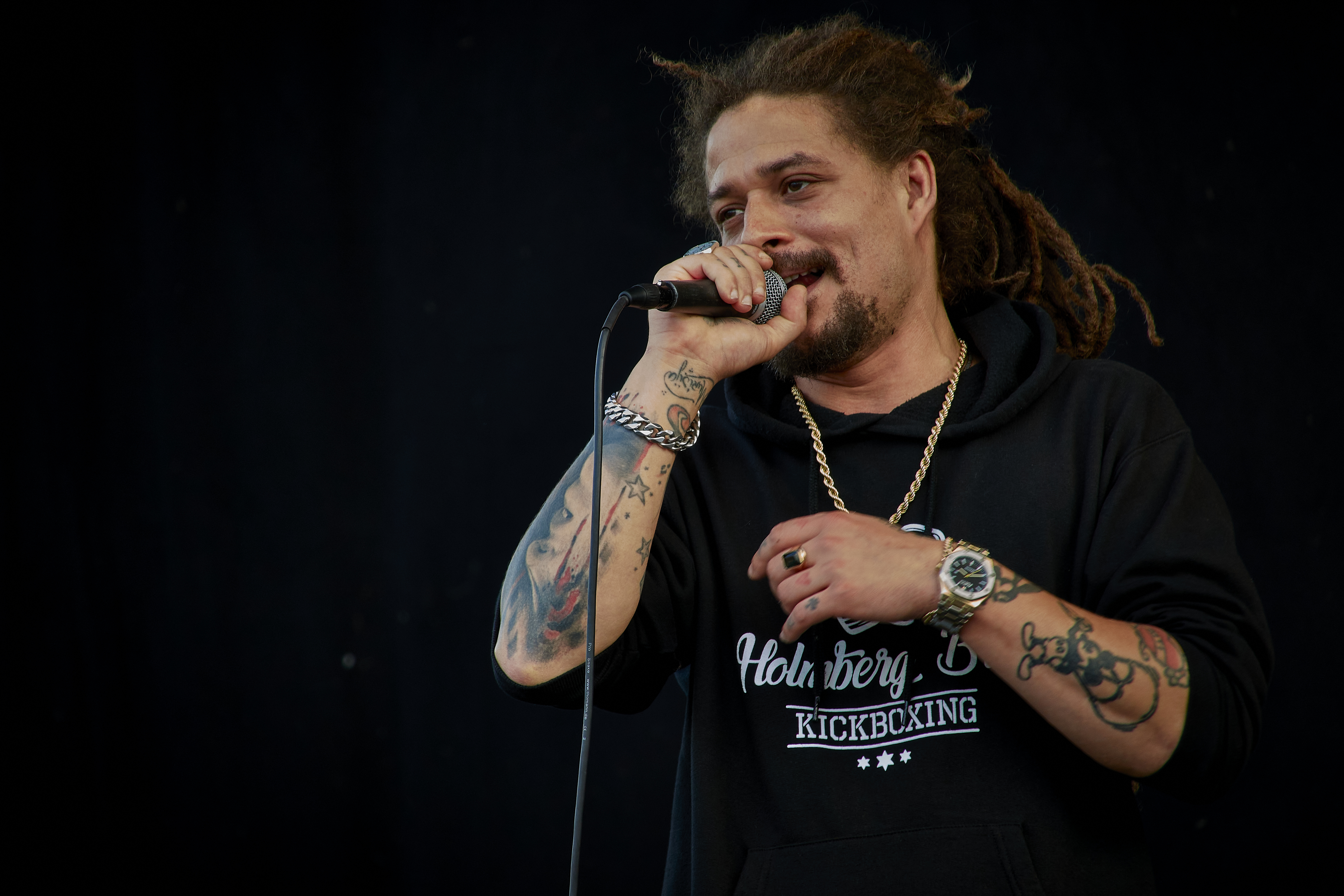
- Juno in 2023

Background information
- Also known as: Juno, Junoesque, Paha Klovni, Jon F. Remedy, Tiger Roots, SuomiRäpinCharlieSheen, GBR:n Jon Holmes, Veltton Jon
- Born: Jon Korhonen; 5 January 1987 (age 39); Helsinki, Finland
- Genres: Hip hop, reggae
- Occupations: Rapper, singer
- Years active: 2000–present
- Labels: Yellowmic Records (2008); Monsp Records (2009–2010); Sony Music (2012–present); GBR Ent. (Green Buddha Records)

Jon Korhonen (born 5 January 1987), better known by his stage name Juno, is a Finnish rapper and singer.

== Early life and career ==
Born in Helsinki, he is of Kenyan and Finnish descent. He lived in the city's Kruununhaka and Pihlajamäki neighborhoods, performing from the early 2000s. In 2005, he appeared as Juno in a TV reality show called Rap SM in the Finnish language rap section of the show. The other rappers in the Finnish leg were Kajo and Ruudolf.

Juno has joined various successful formations. Juno was first in the duo Hulabaloo with Mr. KO using hip hop, rap and electro influences. Signed to the 3rd Rail Music record label, the duo released the album Sirkusteltta in 2008.

He, however, also continued his solo efforts in 2008 releasing his debut solo album 13 on 10 December 2008 on Yellowmic Records that was produced by Sakke Aalto. In the summer of 2009, he also released his own EP Kettoteippi.

In 2009, he became part of the four-member hip hop band SMC Lähiörotat alongside Avionin Prinssi, Erä-Koira and Thono Slowknow. The band had immediate success particularly with the 2009 hit / music video "SMC Hoodrats".

Meanwhile, he also continued posting his own materials like "Suomileffas" (with McVilleGalle) and "Äänitorvia" (with Kosola) and notably his second studio album V-tyyli on 27 January 2010 with Monsp Records followed by J.K x 2 Tunti terapiaa on 13 October 2010. Notable singles included "Pelotteluu" and "Yks risti kaks".

The band SMC Lähiörotat released their 2011 album Raffii Suomi-flättii. The album peaked at number two on The Official Finnish Charts in June 2011. Singles included title track "Raffii Suomi-flättii" with Asa, HenryWho? and Ameeba. Other collaborations included Notkea Rotta, Jodarok, Aqustiikka, Raimo etc. An accompanying DVD was also marketed with the album.

Juno's third major cooperation was in the Finnish rap / reggae / folk formation Elokuu that started in 2011 as a trio including Juno, Nopsajalka and Jonas W. Karlsson. Elokuu has had considerable success with its 2012 album Hääväki saapuu which reached number two on The Official Finnish Charts. Hit singles included the very successful "Soutaa huopaa" (number two in charts) and "Saatilla".

Juno's fourth studio album, 050187, was released in April 2013.

Juno also regularly contributes to the Parasta buddhaa (Best of Buddha) project run by Green Buddha Records (GBR) with several tracks in both Parasta buddhaa (2010) and Parasta buddhaa 2 (2012). GBR has assembled a great number of hip hop artists that besides Juno included Matinpoika, McVilleKalle, Jare, Ama-T, Elia, Sam the Mään a.k.a. Okku, Dj Ink, DJ Double M, Anselmi Oksman and Antti "Kopa" Kosonen.

== Discography ==
=== As Juno ===
==== Albums ====
Juno solo

Album and details	Peak positions
Album and details	FIN
13: Date released: 10 December 2008; Record label: Yellowmic Records	–
V-tyyli: Date released: 2010; Record label: Monsp Records	50
J.K x 2 Tunti terapiaa: Date released: 13 October 2010; Record label: Monsp Records	29
050187: Date released: 14 April 2013; Record label: Sony Music Entertainment	20
Katumuksen sakramentti: Date released: 15 November 2019; Record label: Rokka/Sony	11

==== EPs ====
Juno solo

Album and details	Peak positions
Album and details	FIN
Kettoteippi: Date released: 2009; Record label: Monsp	–

==== Singles ====
Single	Peak positions	Albums
Single	FIN	Albums
"Kuuluuks" (featuring Gracias & Janna): Date released: 2013; Record label: Rokka	5	TBA
"Katumuksen sakramentti" (featuring Leo): Date released: 2018; Record label: Rokka	15	TBA
"Tyhjää" (featuring Jenna Alexa): Date released: 2018; Record label: Rokka	4	TBA
"Hätäraketteja" (featuring Rosi): Date released: 2019; Record label: Rokka	6	TBA
"Vaikutuksen alainen": Date released: 2019; Record label: Rokka	19	TBA

=== Various Juno bands ===
==== Albums ====
as part of Hulabaloo

Album and details	Peak positions
Album and details	FIN
Sirkusteltta: Date released: 2008; Record label: 3rd Rail Records	–

as part of SMC Lähiörotat

Album and details	Peak positions
Album and details	FIN
Raffii Suomi-flättii: Date released: 2011; Record label: Full House	2

as part of Elokuu

Album and details	Peak positions
Album and details	FIN
Hääväki saapuu: Date released: 2012; Record label: EMI	2

featured with Green Buddha Records

Album and details	Peak positions
Album and details	FIN
Parasta buddhaa: Date released: 2010; Record label: Green Buddha Records	–
Parasta buddhaa 2: Date released: 2012; Record label: Green Buddha Records	–

==== Singles ====
as part of Elokuu

Year	Single	Peak positions	Album
Year	Single	FIN	Album
2012	"Soutaa huopaa"	2	Hääväki saapuu
2012	"Saatilla"	8	Hääväki saapuu
