= Elokuu =

Finnish music group

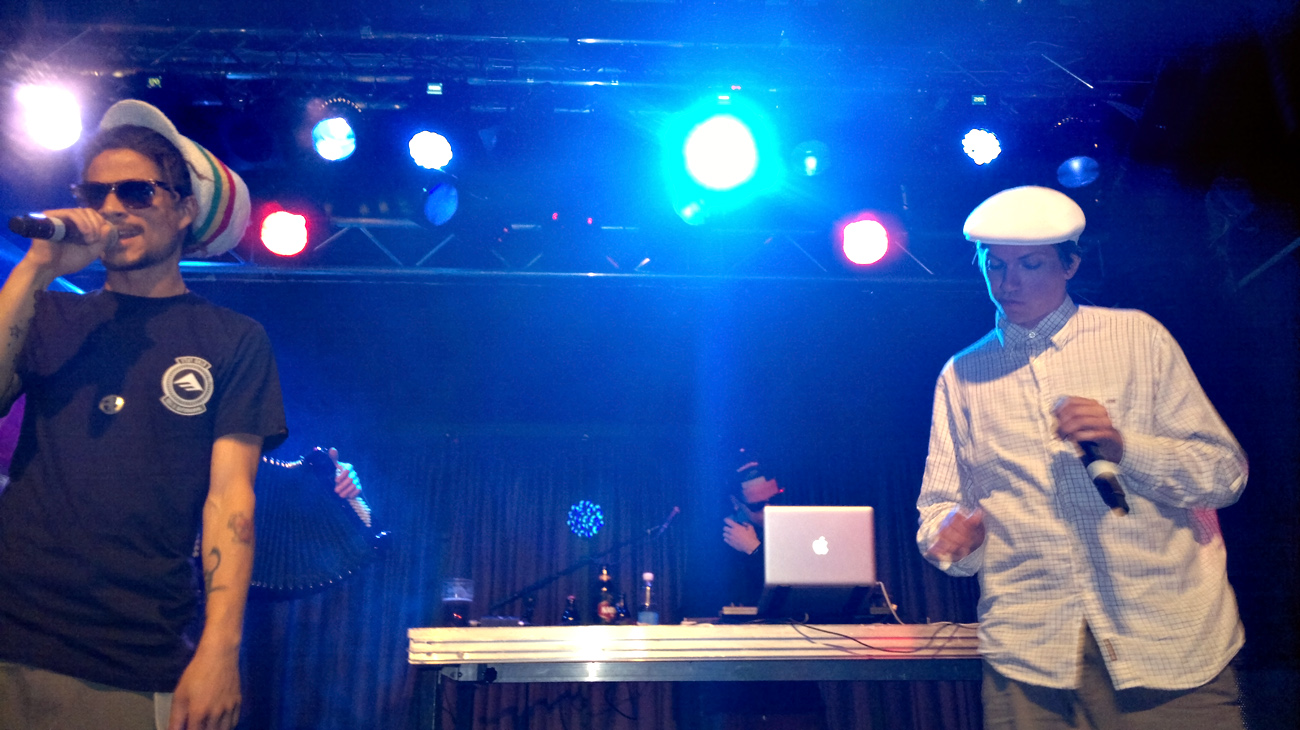
- Elokuu performing at Bar Kino in Pori 20 April 2012

Background information
- Origin: Finland
- Genres: rap, reggae, folk, "cityhumppa"
- Years active: 2011–present
- Label: EMI / Capitol Records
- Members: Nopsajalka; Juno; Jonas W. Karlsson
- Website: Official website

Elokuu ("August" in Finnish) is a Finnish hip hop band founded in 2011 by reggae artist Nopsajalka, Kenyan-Finnish rapper Juno, and producer Jonas W. Karlsson as a mix of Finnish swing and jazz.

Their first official single "Soutaa huopaa" was released on 20 January 2012 with great success. It peaked at number 2 on the Finnish Singles Chart. Elokuu's debut album Hääväki saapuu released by Capitol / EMI Music entered the Finnish Albums Chart at number 2 in its first week of release.

== Discography ==
=== Albums ===
Year	Title	Charts
Year	Title	FIN
2012	Hääväki saapuu	2
2013	Pöytä on katettu	8

=== Singles ===
Year	Title	Charts	Album
Year	Title	FIN	Album
2012	"Soutaa huopaa"	2	Hääväki saapuu
2012	"Saatilla"	8	Hääväki saapuu
2012	"Kullankaivaja"	–	Hääväki saapuu
2013	"Tänään lähtee"	12	Pöytä on katettu
