= Iiro Rantala =

Finnish jazz pianist

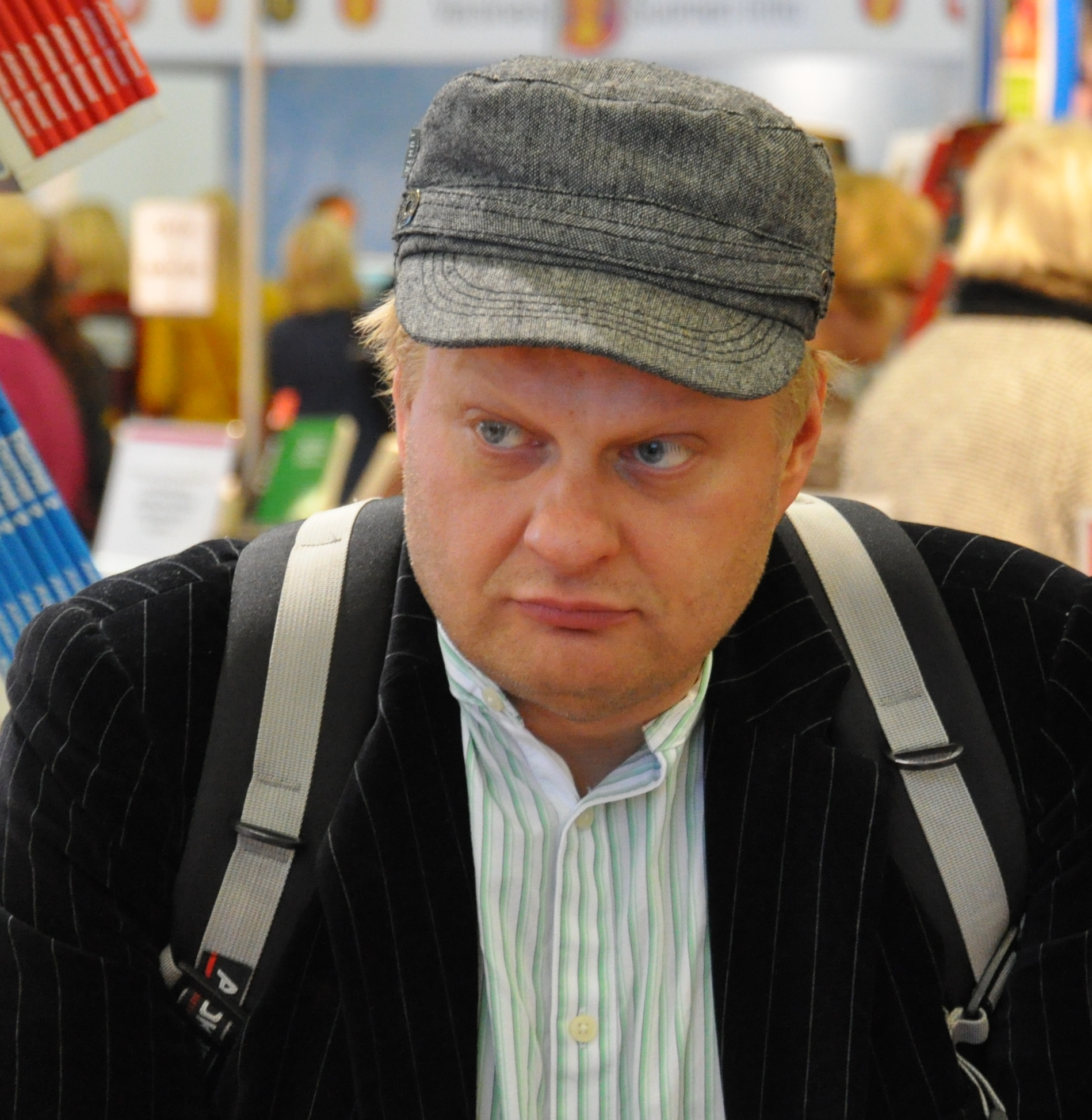
- Iiro Rantala in 2009

Background information
- Born: Iiro Emil Rantala; Helsinki, Finland
- Genres: Jazz, classical
- Occupation: Musician
- Instrument: Piano
- Label: ACT
- Website: Official website

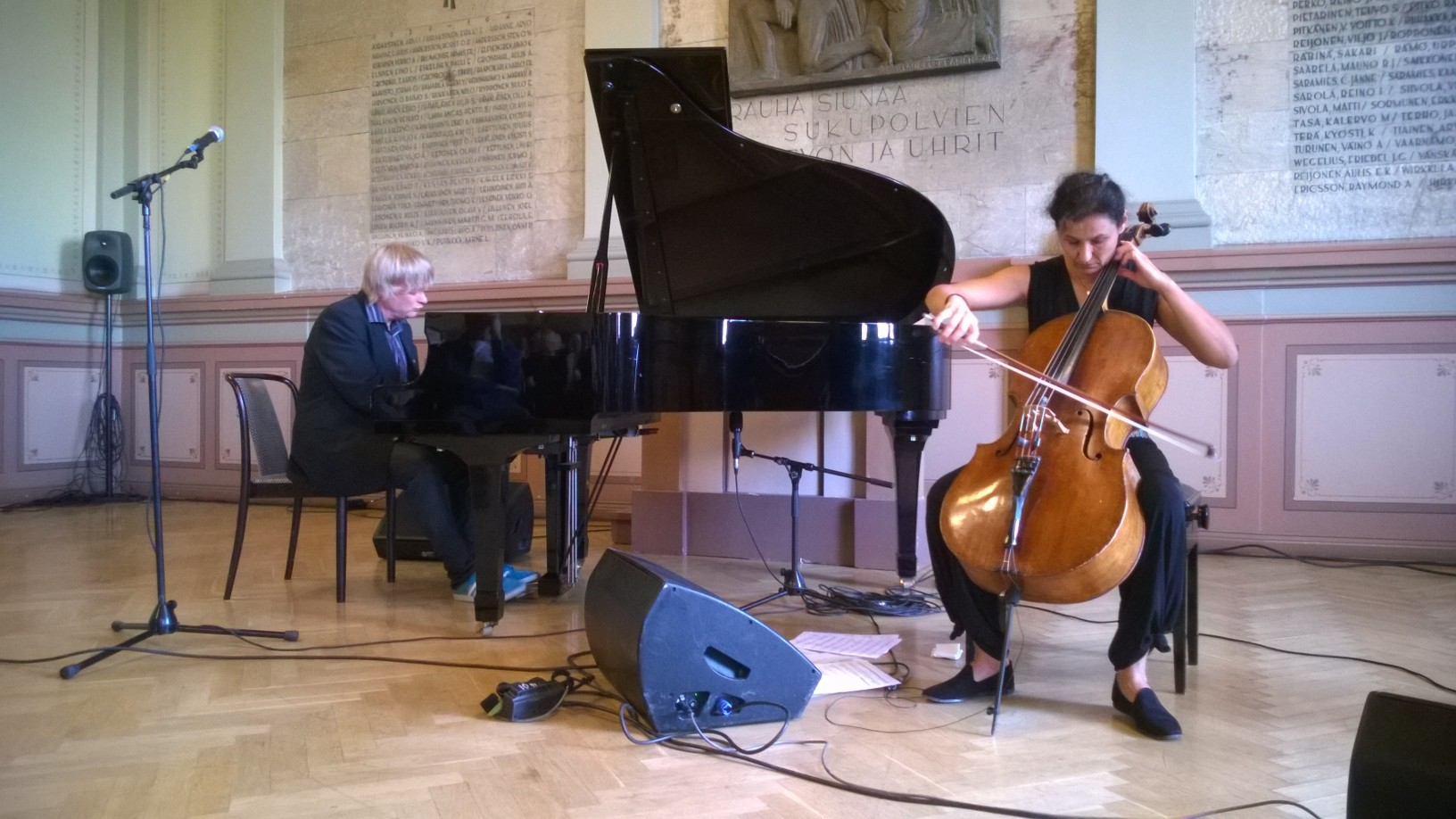
Iiro Rantala and Asja Valcic

Iiro Rantala (born 1970) is a Finnish jazz pianist. He studied piano in the jazz department of Sibelius Academy and classical piano at the Manhattan School of Music. He is one of the best known Finnish jazz pianists, both in Finland and abroad. Rantala is a pianist and composer with Trio Töykeät, a Finnish jazz trio. In addition to jazz, he has composed some classical pieces, most notably the Concerto for Piano and Concerto in G♯ΔA♭.

In 2008, he released the album Elmo with his new formation, the Iiro Rantala New Trio. The members of the trio are Rantala (piano), Marzi Nyman (guitar) and Felix Zenger (beatbox).

In 2017, Rantala was nominated for the Nordic Council Music Prize.

== Discography ==
=== Trio Töykeät ===
- Päivää (Sonet, 1990)
  - International version: G'day (Emarcy, 1993)
- Jazzlantis (Emarcy, 1995)
- Sisu (PolyGram Emarcy, 1998)
- Kudos (Universal Music Group, 2000)
- High Standards (EMI Blue Note, 2003)
- Wake (EMI Blue Note, 2005)
- One Night in Tampere (EMI Blue Note, 2007)

=== Big Bad Family ===
- Big Bad Family (Kompass, 1988)
- Big Bad Family (re-release) (Final Mix Records, 1996)

=== Tango Kings ===
- Tango Kings (Big World, 1995)

=== Sinfonia Lahti, Trio Töykeät, Jaakko ja Pekka Kuusisto ===
- Music! (BIS Records, 2002)

=== SaloRantala Soi ===
- SaloRantala Soi! (Johanna Kustannus, 2003)
- Talvijalka (Sateen ääni, 2009)

=== Rantala & Tapiola Sinfonietta ===
- Concerto for Piano and Concerto in G♯ΔA♭ (Ondine, 2006)

=== Iiro Rantala New Trio ===
- Elmo (Rockadillo Records, 2008)

=== Pekka Kuusisto & Iiro Rantala ===
- Subterráneo, (Liverace, 2009)

=== Iiro Rantala solo piano ===
- Lost Heroes, (ACT, 2011)
- My History of Jazz, (ACT, 2012)

=== Iiro Rantala String Trio ===
- Anyone with a Heart, (ACT, 2014)

=== Iiro Rantala ===
- My Working Class Hero, (ACT, 2015)
- How Long Is Now?, (ACT, 2016)
- Good Stuff, (ACT, 2017)
- My Finnish Calendar, (ACT, 2019)
- Potsdam, (ACT, 2022) (live)
