= SMC Lähiörotat =

Finnish rap group

- Origin: Helsinki, Finland
- Genres: Finnish rap, gangsta rap, skate rap, east coast hip hop
- Years active: 2009–2024
- Label: Full House Records
- Members: Avionin prinssi Erä-Koira; Thono Slowknow
- Past members: Juno

SMC Lähiörotat was a group of Finnish rap artists with their songs focusing in the underground life of Helsinki. Their debut album Raffii Suomi-flättii was released on 15 June 2011. It peaked at #2 on the Finnish Album Chart.

SMC is known for their humorous skateboarding-themed songs and music videos and their extensive and innovative use of Helsinki slang . Their lyrics are often satirical portraits of skateboarding culture, petty criminal lifestyle and vandalism.

== History ==
=== 2009–2011 ===
The group became known from the YouTube video "SMC Hoodrats". It was filmed for a movie called Skatemaniacs, but also uploaded on YouTube in 2009. On the video, artists rap about good old times and hoods. It was directed by Pablo Films. The background music is originally from Mobb Deep's "Shook Ones (Part II)" instrumental version. The video got a lot of viewers in a short time and has been now watched over six million times. The song was named as "Northside nagetti" for the debut album Raffii Suomi-flättii. That version has a new beat, which tries to be more honest for the original "Shook Ones (Part II)".

The second video, "Lähiörotat skujaa" ("Cruising Hoodrats"), from SMC Lähiörotat came out in October 2010. It got over 100,000 views in four days and after two weeks it broke the line of million views. The theme of the song stays same. The video had same director and the beat was from two Finnish producers K.V.N & Lobo. The video is also visited by rap artist Notkea Rotta.

In 2011 SMC Lähiörotat got nominated in three different categories in appreciated Finnish music awards ceremony Emma-gaala.

=== 2011-2015 ===
In November 2012 SMC Lähiörotat's new music video of "Vastavirta" was published. Song was featured by Naispyy & Jinks. In May 2013 SMC Lähiörotat/Notkea Rotta - split 10"+CD was published.[9]

SMC Lähiörotat and Notkea Rotta published their EP on 21 February 2014. EP was released as only 666. copy edition in 10-inch vinyl. Through Full House Records, EP's first music video "Rottaradio" came out in November 2013.

In April 2015 group published a new album called ”Ja niin se menee”, with singles ”Lotioonit pannassa”, ”Bitumin katku”, ”Ja niin se menee” and previously released ”Vastavirta”. New album features Davo and Lataaja Wormisto from "Jätkäjätkät" -group.

=== 2020- ===
On 29 February, after a 5-year hiatus, SMC Lähiörotat published their new song, "Suolaa haavoihin" with a new music video. One of the members, Juno, doesn't appear on the video.

== Discography ==
=== Albums ===
- 2011: Raffii Suomi-flättii
- 2015: Ja niin se menee

=== Singles ===
- 2024: Ysikuudest Ikuisuuteen

=== Music videos ===
- 2009: "Northside nagetti"
- 2010: "Lähiörotat skujaa" (feat. Notkea Rotta)
- 2011: "Yks risti kaks"
- "Raffii Suomi-flättii" (feat. Asa, HenryWho? & Ameeba)
- "Lahden sininen" (feat. El Maestro & Raikka)
- 2012: "Vastavirta" (feat. Naispyy & Jinks)
- 2013: "Rottaradio" (Notkea Rotta & SMC Lähiörotat)
- 2014: "Bitumin katku"
- 2015: "Ja niin se menee"
- 2020: "Suolaa haavoihin"
- 2024: "Ysikuudest Ikuisuuteen"
