= Sun (Nopsajalka album) =

Studio album by Nopsajalka
- Released: 14 March 2014
- Language: Finnish
- Label: Kuuluuks

Nopsajalka chronology
| Kuningas soundi (2010) | Sun (2014) | Mun (2015) |

Sun is the fourth solo studio album by Finnish musician Nopsajalka. Released on 14 March 2014, the album peaked at number 15 on the Finnish Albums Chart.

== Track listing ==
| No. | Title | Length |
|---|---|---|
| 1. | "Salaisuus" | 3:52 |
| 2. | "Seuraava" (featuring Erin) | 4:07 |
| 3. | "Kaupunkiin" | 3:55 |
| 4. | "Kolmekymppinen nainen" (featuring Huge L) | 3:20 |
| 5. | "Hajoo" | 3:23 |
| 6. | "Sun luo" | 4:17 |
| 7. | "Nitisee & natisee" (featuring Rauhatäti) | 3:26 |
| 8. | "Nautintoo" | 3:55 |
| 9. | "Tuntuu menevän lujaa" | 3:35 |
| 10. | "Lupaan olla" | 4:25 |

== Charts ==
| Chart (2014) | Peak position |
|---|---|
| Finnish Albums (Suomen virallinen lista) | 15 |

== Release history ==
| Region | Date | Format | Label |
|---|---|---|---|
| Finland | 14 March 2014 | CD, digital download | Kuuluuks |
