= Pöytä on katettu =

Studio album by Elokuu
- Released: 22 May 2013
- Label: EMI, Capitol Records

Elokuu chronology
Hääväki saapuu (2012)	Pöytä on katettu (2013)

Pöytä on katettu is the second studio album by Finnish band Elokuu. It was released on 22 May 2013. In its first week of release, the album peaked at number eight on the Finnish Album Chart.

== Singles ==
Two singles were released; "Tänään lähtee", which peaked at number 12 on the Finnish Singles Chart, and "Valvoo".

== Track listing ==
No.	Title	Length
1.	"Liikkuu"	3:39
2.	"Avautuu"	2:37
3.	"Vastaamattomii puheluita"	3:49
4.	"Tänään lähtee"	3:11
5.	"Elonmerkkei"	3:15
6.	"Auervaara"	3:22
7.	"Iha mitä vaan, iha miten vaan"	3:35
8.	"Valvoo"	3:12
9.	"Sormus"	3:28
10.	"Viimestä päivää"	3:16

== Chart performance ==
Chart (2013)	Peak position
Finland (Suomen virallinen lista)	8
