= Concerto for Piano and Concerto in G♯ΔA♭ =

Concerto for Piano and Concerto in G♯^{Δ}A♭ (pronounced Gis-Maj-As) is a piano concerto written by the Finnish jazz pianist Iiro Rantala and orchestrated by the Finnish violinist, composer and conductor Jaakko Kuusisto.

The concerto begins with the sound of the orchestra "tuning up".

== Recordings ==
- Recorded by Tapiola Sinfonietta, conducted by Jaakko Kuusisto, piano by Iiro Rantala.
