= Tontilla taas =

Studio album by Nopsajalka
- Released: 2006
- Language: Finnish
- Label: Monsp Records

Nopsajalka chronology
Tontilla taas (2006)	5 sormee (2009)

Tontilla taas is the debut solo studio album by Finnish musician Nopsajalka. Released in October 2006, the album peaked at number 32 on the Finnish Albums Chart.

== Track listing ==
No.	Title	Length
1.	"Tuli talos" (featuring Raappana)	3:30
2.	"Haluun takas"	2:42
3.	"Tontilla taas" (featuring Super Janne)	3:46
4.	"Luonnollinen nainen"	2:29
5.	"Omaa juttuu" (featuring Jodarok)	3:34
6.	"Mäsäks"	3:07
7.	"Parhaat bileet" (featuring Mariska)	2:36
8.	"Aitoo kamaa (Oikea rakkaus ei odota)"	3:18
9.	"Hyvää huolta"	3:03
10.	"Kuumotus"	2:59
11.	"Lisää liekkii"	3:13
12.	"Hyvää elämää" (featuring Paarma)	4:37

== Charts ==
Chart (2006)	Peak position
Finnish Albums (Suomen virallinen lista)	32

== Release history ==
Region	Date	Format	Label
Finland	2006	CD, LP	Monsp Records
