= Emma Salokoski =

Finnish composer and songwriter

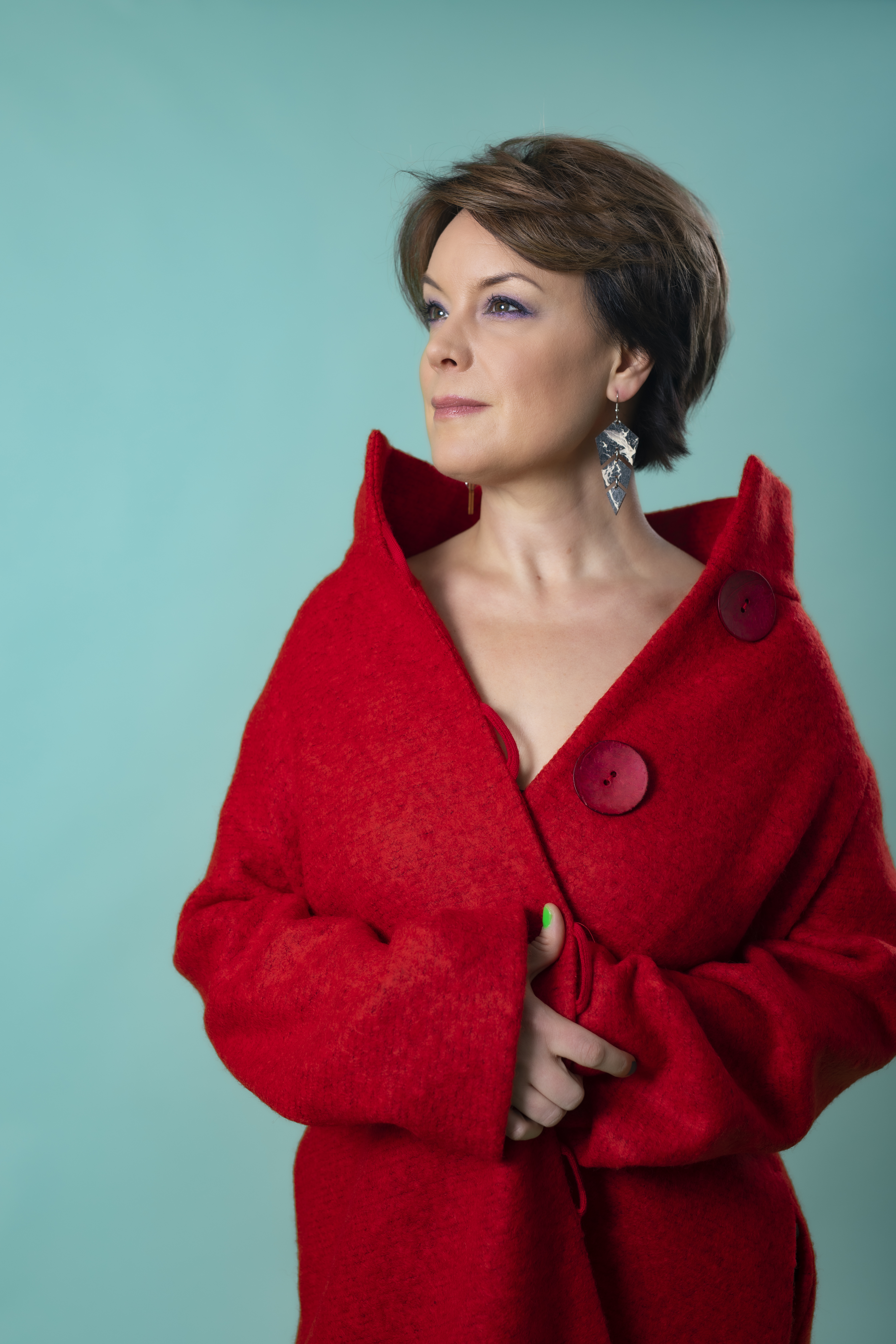
Emma Salokoski, promotional image from 2020

Emma Salokoski (born 28 October 1976 in Helsinki, Finland) is a Finnish singer. She sings in the Emma Salokoski Ensemble (a continuation of the Emma Salokoski Trio) and in Quintessence and is an active member in the funk music band Q-Continuum. She also composes and writes her own songs; all songs on the album Kiellettyjä asioita were written by Salokoski and most of them were also composed by her.

== Early life and bands ==
Salokoski was born in Helsinki in 1976. Her mother is anthropologist Märta Salokoski, who has studied the culture of the Ovambo people in Namibia based on Emil Liljeblad's collection. Märta Salokoski is Finland-Swedish and Emma Salokoski speaks Swedish as her native language. She has two brothers. When Salokoski was three years old her family moved to Moscow, Soviet Union (present-day Russia), where her father worked in a bank. The family moved back to Finland three years later. Salokoski went to a Swedish-speaking school until the ninth grade, when she moved to a Finnish-speaking musical class.

Salokoski started her music hobby at the age of 11 by playing the violin, but soon moved to the viola. When studying at the Sibelius gymnasium at the age of 18 she started to concentrate on singing. The first band where she sang was her little brother's progressive rock band. After taking a year's break from her studies after gymnasium Salokoski moved to Stockholm, Sweden to study musical theatre at the Kulturama university of performing arts. She graduated in 1998 and worked at the Tampere Theatre in the musical Rent and at the Helsinki City Theatre in the musical Les Misérables for a year. After this she moved to study at the Pop & Jazz Conservatory in Helsinki after having applied there for three times. In 2001, she moved to the jazz music department at the Sibelius Academy. Salokoski dropped out of her studies at these last two institutions.

In 2006, Salokoski became interested in the Complete vocal technique of singing. She had a few singing classes in Denmark and later participated in a course in Finland for a year. She graduated as a teacher of singing techniques in Copenhagen in late 2009.

Salokoski has been a member of the band Quintessence since its founding in 1999. In 2001, the band published its first EP record White Light and in the next year Texicalli Records published the band's debut album Talk Less Listen More. The band's second album 5 am was published in 2004.

== Emma Salokoski Ensemble ==
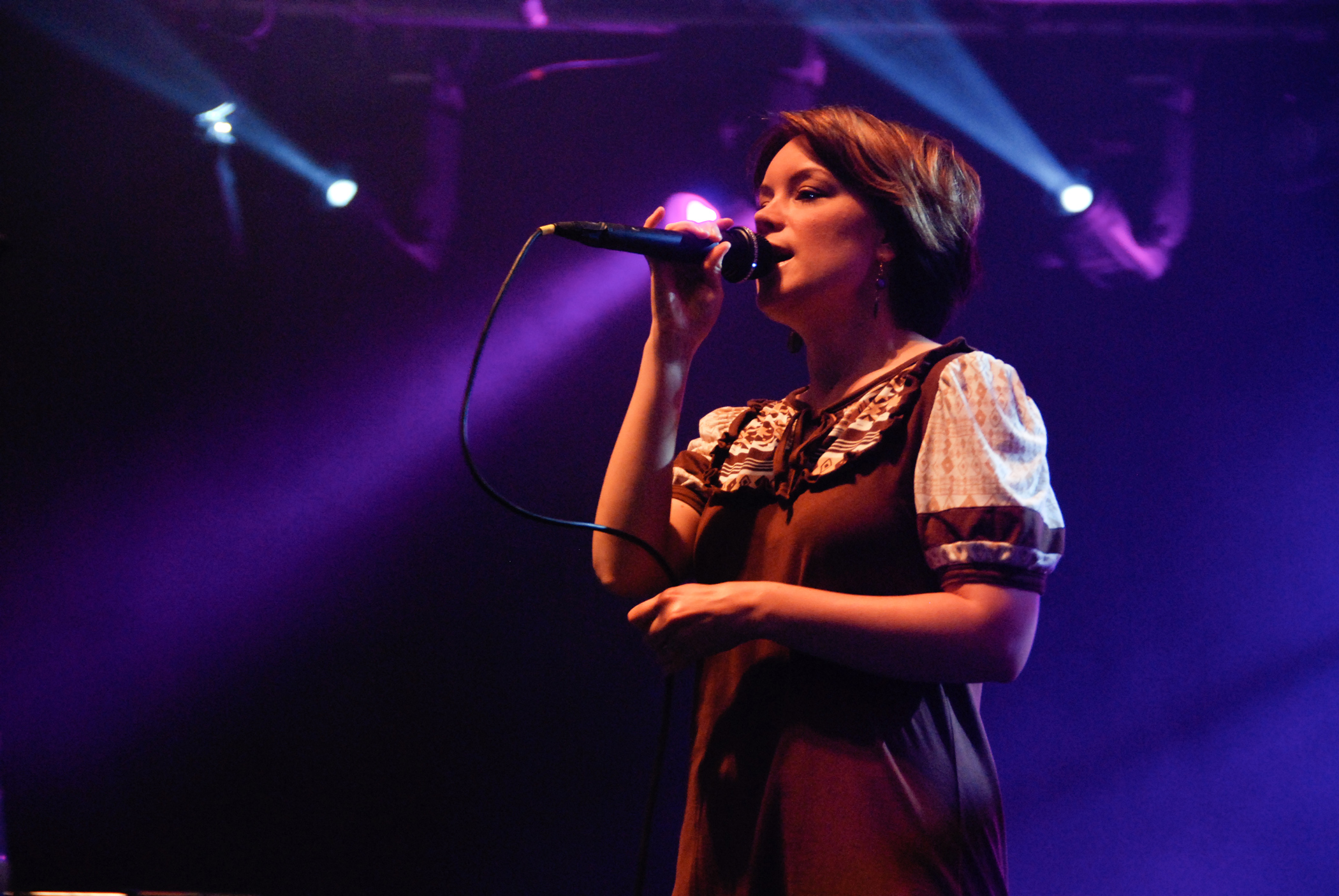
Emma Salokoski at Ilosaarirock in 2007

Salokoski first performed as a solo artist in spring 2000. In autumn 2003, the Emma Salokoski Trio, including Salokoski, guitarist Mikko Kosonen and Lauri Porra who is better known as the bass player of Stratovarius, published its first EP record Puutarhassa. The EP spent seven weeks at The Official Finnish Charts, reaching place #12. The record included two Finnish songs and two Brazilian bossa nova classics.

The band was later joined by the keyboard player Tuomo Prättälä, who had appeared on the trio's EP as a guest artist, and by the percussionist and drummer Marko Timonen. At this time the band renamed itself from Emma Salokoski Trio to Emma Salokoski Ensemble. In December 2005, the quintet published the album Kaksi mannerta, which had been named after its namesake song composed after Aulikki Oksanen's poem. The album was Salokoski's first publication entirely in Finnish. She has also written the songs "Mina Maneira", "Näkymätön" (Finnish lyrics) and "Ilmaa" on the record, as well as composed and written the song "Sua jos aattelen". The album reached place #4 at The Official Finnish Charts, and the single "Miksi sä meet" on the album reached place #2 at the Radio Suomi charts. The album reached the 15,000 sales threshold for a gold record in Finland in January 2008.

Emma Salokoski Ensemble's second album Veden alla was published on 27 August 2008. The album contains the band's own production as well as songs from J. Karjalainen, Dave Lindholm and Tuomari Nurmio. Instead of the bossa nova rhythms of the first records, the musical style on the album has drawn influence from jazz and folk music. The album was recorded in November and October at the Finnvox studio in Helsinki. On its first week, the album reached place #2 at The Official Finnish Charts and held the place for three weeks. The single "Rakkaus polttaa" published from the record went to the top place of the Radio Helsinki chart and place #2 at the Radio Suomi chart. After publishing the record, the band went on a tour of ten concerts starting on 11 September in Järvenpää and finishing at the Tavastia Club in Helsinki on 1 October.

== Other information ==
Salokoski has had guest appearances on records of many other artists (Don Johnson Big Band, Husky Rescue, Tuomo, Sami Saari) and performed with many famous Finnish jazz musicians and bands (such as Jukka Perko, Severi Pyysalo and Sakari Kukko). Salokoski and the Ilmiliekki Quartet have planned to publish an album containing Swedish songs, and in March 2009 Salokoski and Maria Ylipää recorded an album whose songs were composed after Finnish poems. Salokoski has also made some songs for other artists such as V-Chips and Husky Rescue. Emma Salokoski also leads her own choir Emma Salokoski Voices, which has performed two musical theatre plays, Plastic Bride and Body Positive!

Salokoski played the waitress Liisa in the 2004 film Keisarikunta. At the 2006 Emma-gaala, Salokoski was awarded best female vocalist of the year. She also appeared on the third season of the Finnish TV show Kuorosota from 2010 to 2011.

Salokoski's father is the cousin of the Finnish singer Pekka Streng.
