= Tie Vapauteen (album) =

Studio album by Paleface & Laulava unioni
- Released: November 28, 2019
- Recorded: 2019
- Studios: Raja-Audio Studio, Salo
- Genre: Industrial folk music
- Label: Finalmix Records
- Producer: Tipi Tuovinen

Tie Vapauteen (Finnish for "Road to Freedom") is an album by the Finnish rapper Paleface and the band Laulava unioni (Paleface and the Singing Union), released in Finland at the end of November 2019. It contains newly recorded versions of Finnish-American industrial folk music songs.

== Background ==
The Industrial Workers of the World (IWW), an anarchistic trade union in the United States and Canada, had a strong singing tradition, and its Finnish-American groups had many songs in the Finnish language as well. These songs had all but been forgotten when musicologist Saijaleena Rantanen found three Finnish-language IWW songbooks in the Immigration History Research Center archive in Minneapolis and at the Lakehead University archive in Thunder Bay, Canada. Of these three books, only one had a known copy in Finland, and only individual pages of the other two had previously been known to have survived. The songs had possibly last been heard a hundred years earlier at American Finn halls.

The songbooks contained only the lyrics of the songs, no sheet music. Finding the melodies took some deduction and detective work. It was easy to connect the song "Solidaarisuutta aina" to an English-language song called "Solidarity Forever", but the melody of the song "Langenneen laulun" (‘the song of the fallen woman’) was more difficult to find. In the end, Rantanen found the sheet music of this song for the piano at the Library of Congress in Washington D.C. The authors of many of the texts are unknown, as they would have likely faced discrimination at their work places if known.

The IWW grew in popularity in the 1910s. The Finns called the members of this union with the word “tuplajuulaiset” (‘double U folks’). Finns constituted the biggest ethnic segment of this union and they were also the most active members. The circulation of their magazine, the Industrialisti was 10,000 copies. Many of the IWW members knew little or no English, so it was natural for the union to produce songs in the Finnish language. The melodies of these songs were in many cases familiar to the Finns, and it was easy for them to learn the new words to them. The melodies came from here and there, e.g. from Oskar Merikanto, and the Swedish American Joe Hill, whose real name was Joel Hägglund. One melody was taken from the song "The Battle Hymn of the Republic", and others were taken from the theater and from folk music.

Rantanen told of her finds to music producer and connoisseur of working class folk music Timo “Tipi” Tuovinen, and together they continued the detective work. Some four decades earlier, in the late 1970s, Tuovinen had collected anti-church American Finnish music, and he was planning to release a record of it, but the bankruptcy of Love Records put an end to those plans. In the 1980s, the Finnish record companies were not interested in such themes.

The next thing to happen was that Tuovinen suggested to the rap artist Paleface that they should put together a band that would play the Finnish IWW songs. Paleface had earlier performed songs by Hiski Salomaa and Joe Hill, it did not take much persuasion to get him on the band wagon. The third member to join the group was Ossi Peura, and now they had a core of a band that could sing harmonies. After this accordionist Harri Kuusijärvi and drummer Anssi Nykänen joined the band. Tuovinen and Peura arranged the songs, with their previous expertise of the music genres of the times, but the use of imagination also played a part, as it had done with the American Finns of the time.

The name Laulava unioni (‘The Singing Union’) was chosen for the band, as that is what the IWW was also called in America.

== Songs on the album ==
The music for the song "Pontevat mahat" was composed by Oskar Merikanto, and the original is the provincial song of Lapland and North Ostrobothnia. Also the music in "Hoopon laulu" (‘The Hobo Song’) was by Merikanto, the original being called "Tula tuulan tuli tuli tei!"

The melody for "Siispä laulakaa" (‘Sing, therefore’) was taken from the song "My Old Kentucky Home", whereas that of "Säälikää herroja" (‘Have mercy on the fine gentlemen’) is from an old Methodist hymn. Also the melody for "Karvajalka" is from a hymn called "Sunlight, Sunlight". In "Kirkkopotpuri" (‘Church Potpourri’) the melodies of a German youth song and the Swedish birthday song "Ja må han leva" are combined.

The band had to exercise some artistic freedom, as IWW songs often had a great many verses, even up to 40, and it is not possible to perform such songs in their entirety today.

Many of the songs are in major scale, which gives them a joyous feeling, and included are also some rowdy ditties making fun of this or that.

== Track listing ==
No.	Title	Lyrics	Music	Arrangement	Length
1.	"Uniossa on voima (There Is Power in a Union)"	Joe Hill, Finnish lyrics anonymous	Lewis E. Jones	Ossi Peura & Tipi Tuovinen	3:07
2.	"Solidaarisuutta aina (Solidarity Forever)"	Ralph Chaplin, Finnish lyrics anonymous	trad.	Tipi Tuovinen	3:12
3.	"Maailman proletaarit nouskaa"	Joe Hill, Finnish lyrics anonymous	Joe Hill	Ossi Peura & Tipi Tuovinen	4:10
4.	"Long Way and Short Way"	Anonymous	Williams/Judge	Tipi Tuovinen	5:10
5.	"Hoopon laulu"	Anonymous	Oskar Merikanto	Ossi Peura	3:41
6.	"Pontevat mahat"	Anonymous	Oskar Merikanto	Tipi Tuovinen	2:23
7.	"Siispä laulakaa"	Joe Hill, Finnish lyrics O.-J. Pellikka	Stephen Foster	Ossi Peura	4:17
8.	"Langenneen laulu"	Anonymous	Garwood Simons		4:52
9.	"Säälikää herroja"	Pen name Ikki Ikinen = Henry Jokinen	Albert Midlane	Ossi Peura	3:03
10.	"Rikkurin synty"	Jack London (trad.?)			1:20
11.	"Karvajalka"	Joe Hill, Finnish lyrics anonymous	W. S. Weeden	Tipi Tuovinen	6:14
12.	"Kirkkopotpuri"	Anonymous	trad.	Tipi Tuovinen	6:18
13.	"Lännen lokari"	Hiski Salomaa	Hiski Salomaa	Ossi Peura & Tipi Tuovinen	3:07

== Musicians ==
- Paleface, vocals and acoustic guitar
- Tipi Tuovinen, double bass
- Ossi Peura, charango
- Harri Kuusijärvi, accordion
- Anssi Nykänen, drums

=== Visitors ===
- Helsinki Workers' Association's women's choir Elegia, conducted by Anna Karjula (tracks 3, 7, 8, 9), soloist on track 9: Kaisu Säynevirta
- Janne Toivonen, trumpet and cornet (tracks 1, 10, 12)
- Antti Hynninen, flute and alto saxophone (tracks 1, 10, 12)
- Juho Viljanen, trombone and tuba (tracks 1, 10, 12)
- Miihkali Jaatinen, banjo and banjo arrangement (tracks 2, 3, 4, 10, 11)

== Production ==
- Producer: Tipi Tuovinen
- Engineering, mixing and mastering: Kari Laaksonen
- Studio: Raja-Audio Studio, Meriniitty, Salo (Naiskuoro Elegia, perkussios, banjo and some vocals: Cold Creek Recording Studios, Vantaa; horns: Vintage Music Corner, Vantaa; grand piano: Kallio-Kuninkala, Vantaa)
- Cover: Karri Miettinen & Jani Tolin on the basis of the cover of the American Finnish Tie Vapauteen magazine cover of November 1930
- Layout and design: Jani Tolin
