= Sofi de la Torre =

Spanish singer-songwriter

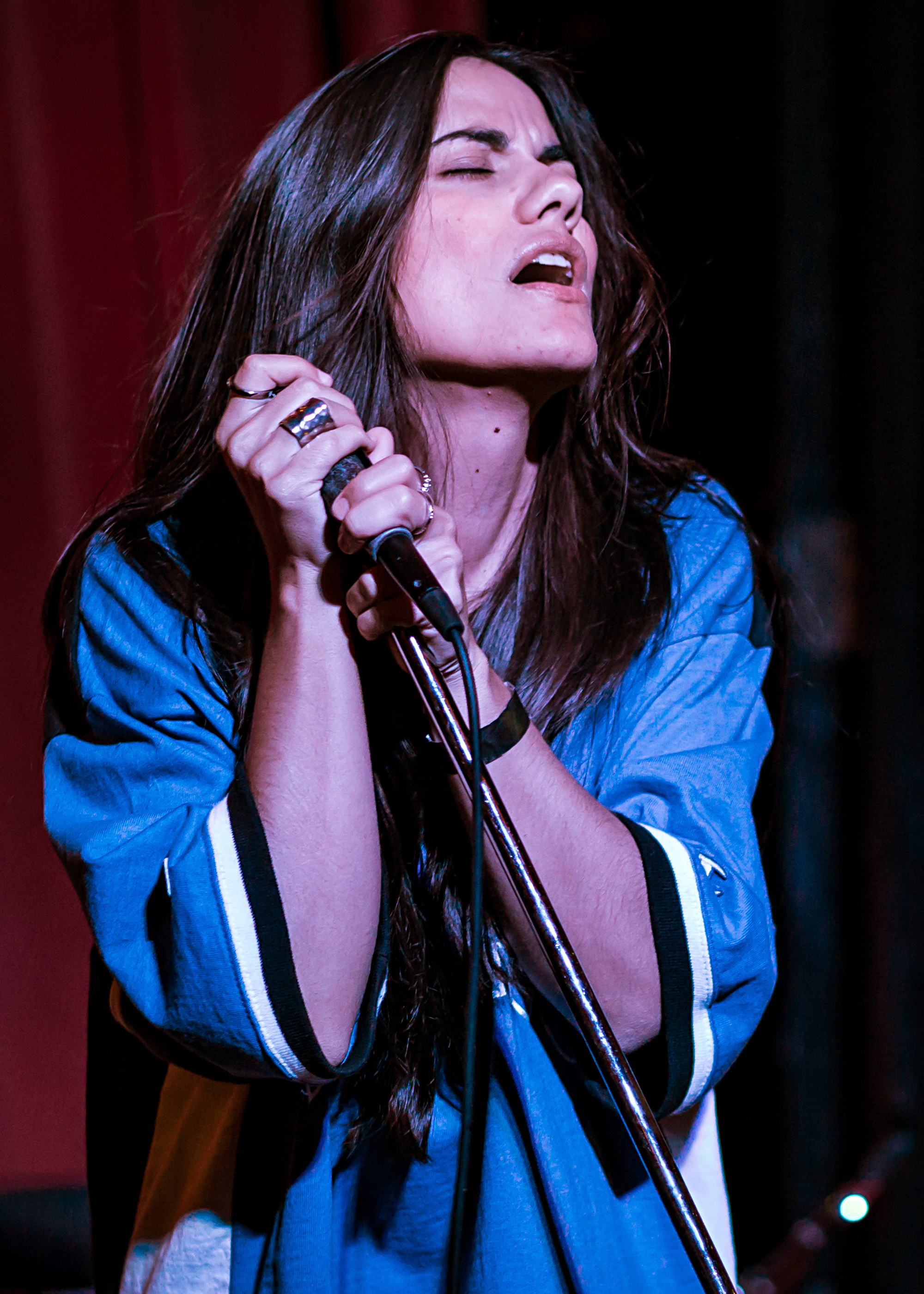
Sofi de la Torre

Sofi de la Torre (16 March 1991) is a singer and songwriter from the Canary Islands, whose music combines elements from chillwave and rhythm and blues.

After high school, where she discovered a talent for music, she moved to Los Angeles, but then went to London to go to school, studying media and communications. She turned back to music and released two pop-rock singles ("Heartbeat" and "Faster"), and was asked by German film director Felix Fuchssteiner to contribute them to the soundtrack of Rubinrot ("Ruby Red"); she also appeared in the movie. She released her first album, Mine, in 2013 to modest success. In 2014, she gained international attention with the single "Vermillion", co-written with Jonas W. Karlsson. After that, three EPs followed: Give Up at 2, Mess, and That Isn't You, and with Karlsson she produced, in 2017, the single "London x Paris." Karlsson also produced her second album, Another? Not Me, I'm Done.

== Discography ==
=== Albums ===
- Mine (2013)
- Another? Not Me, I'm Done
