= 5 sormee =

Studio album by Nopsajalka
- Released: 9 March 2009
- Language: Finnish
- Label: Monsp Records

Nopsajalka chronology
Tontilla taas (2006)	5 sormee (2009)	Kuningas soundi (2010)

5 sormee is the second solo studio album by Finnish musician Nopsajalka. Released on 9 March 2009, the album peaked at number 16 on the Finnish Albums Chart.

== Track listing ==
No.	Title	Length
1.	"Valmiina"	2:50
2.	"Ihmees"	3:50
3.	"Jäljillä"	3:18
4.	"Koko illan"	3:19
5.	"Näin mä näin"	3:09
6.	"Ring Tone"	2:36
7.	"Lanteilla"	3:32
8.	"Villiks"	3:39
9.	"Jano"	4:23
10.	"Se juttu"	2:44
11.	"Tunteet"	3:39

== Charts ==
Chart (2009)	Peak position
Finnish Albums (Suomen virallinen lista)	16

== Release history ==
Region	Date	Format	Label
Finland	9 March 2009	CD	Monsp Records
