= G-Day (disambiguation) =

G-Day a series of events held by Google in Latin America, Middle East, Africa and India for developers, etc.

G-Day may also refer to:

- G-Day in military designation of days and hours is the unnamed day on which an order, normally national, is given to deploy a unit
- G'day, an Australian English greeting
- gDay, a primitive data type in XML Schema (W3C)
