= Kapteeni Ä-ni =

Finnish music group

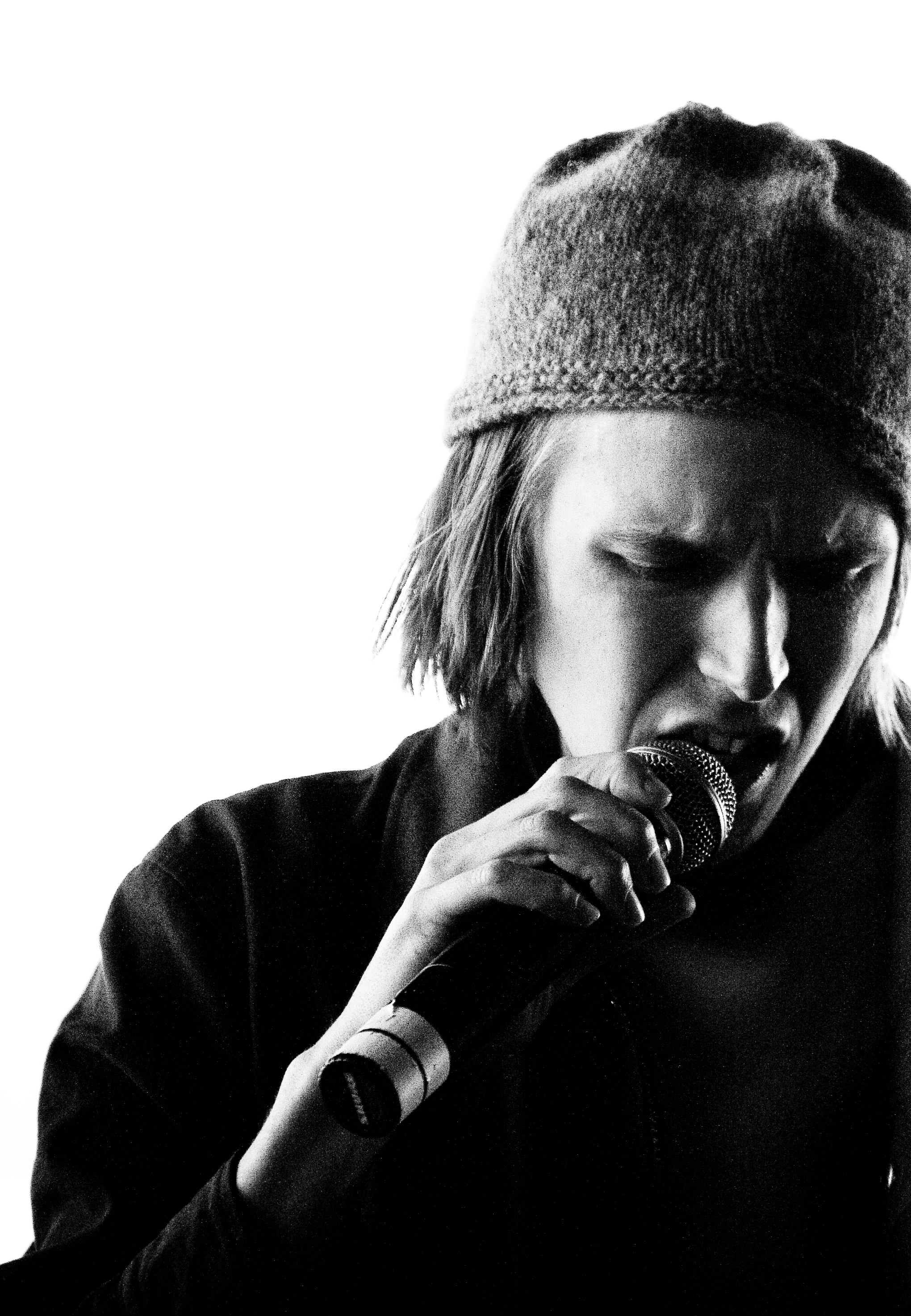
- Jukka Poika

Background information
- Origin: Finland
- Genres: Reggae, Dub, Ragga, Hip hop
- Years active: 2000–2003
- Labels: Wolfgang Records
- Members: Jukka Poika; Antti Nopsajalka; Bommitommi

Kapteeni Ä-ni were a Finnish musical group who played reggae, dub and hip hop music. The band's members were Jukka Poika (vocals), Antti Nopsajalka (vocals and rhythms) and Bommitommi (producer and mixer). They were active from 2000 to 2003. Their single "Tiettyä tunnelmaa" was a #6 hit in Finland in 2002.

== Discography ==
- Kapteeni Ä-ni EP (2000)

Massi täys mazQ / Välipeli / Oma sana / Kiipeli 2

- Kiipeli 2 / Seis -12" single (2001)

Kiipeli 2 / Seis // Kiipeli 2 Isaac Spayes dub / Seis rytmi

- Tiettyä tunnelmaa single (2001)

Tiettyä tunnelmaa / Tylppä kärki edellä / Syyää eka

- Parhaat (2002)

KaiQQlttuuria / Qleeko galaxi ? / Herra on mun moottori / Liekkii täytyy ruokkii / Tuuttiruuhkaa / Rullaan / Kiipeli 3 / Tarpeex rahaa / Tiettyä tunnelmaa / Tylppä kärki edellä / Kärpänen (varo suutas / (ihmiset) Puhuu ja kävelee / Tiivistettä / (...sumeaa logiikkaa) / Sitä & tätä / Syyää eka

- Rullaan / Lunki kuski single (2002)

Rullaan / Rullaan (Bommitommi remix) / Lunki kuski / Lunki kuski (instrumental) / Rullaan video (MPEG 1)

- Vinyyli EP (2002)

Tiettyä tunnelmaa / Tylppä kärki edellä / Hamppukaupunki // Kiipeli 3 / Karqwankkurit (Kiipeli 3:n rytmi) / Sitä & tätä

- Älä oo tyhmä' compilation CD (2006)

Kerran töissä / Älä oo tyhmä / Lunki kuski / Kaffipäissään / KaiQQlttuuria / Oma sana / Syyää eka
