= Nopsajalka =

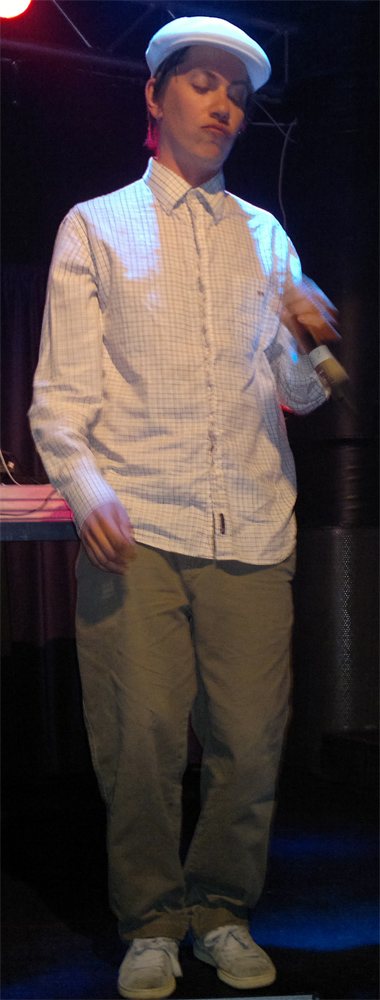
- Nopsajalka in 2011.

Background information
- Also known as: Nopsajalka, Antti Nopsajalka, Nopsa
- Born: Antti Ilmari Hakala; 1978 (age 46–47); Vantaa, Finland
- Instruments: Keyboards, guitar, bass, vocals
- Years active: 2000–present

Antti Ilmari Hakala (born 1978), professionally known as Nopsajalka, is a Finnish musician and producer. Aside from his solo career, he has been a member of the bands Elokuu, Soul Captain Band and Kapteeni Ä-ni. To date, Nopsajalka has released five studio albums.

== Selected discography ==
=== Solo albums ===
Year	Title	Peak position
Year	Title	FIN
2006	Tontilla taas	32
2009	5 sormee	16
2010	Kuningas soundi	29
2014	Sun	15
2015	Mun	22
2020	Sade	

=== Solo singles ===
Year	Title	Peak position
Year	Title	FIN
2014	"Lupaan olla"	2
2016	"Nosta mua"	13

Featured in

Year	Title	Peak position
Year	Title	FIN
2003	"Asvaltti" (Toni Wirtanen, Infekto, Leijonanmieli, Paarma, Nopsajalka, Bommitommi)	8
