= Breaking Daylight =

Studio album by Don Johnson Big Band
- Released: 12 May 2003
- Genre: Hip hop
- Length: 60:00
- Label: Beat Back; Universal Music
- Producer: Don Johnson Big Band

Don Johnson Big Band chronology
Support de Microphones (2000)	Breaking Daylight (2003)	Don Johnson Big Band (2006)

Singles from Breaking Daylight
- 1. "One MC, One Delay" Released: 2003; 2. "Jah Jah Blow Job" Released: 2003

Breaking Daylight is the second album by Finnish hip hop group Don Johnson Big Band. It topped the Finnish album charts and has been certified Platinum in Finland. Both singles released from the album reached top-ten on the singles chart.

Finnish singer Emma Salokoski is prominently featured on several tracks.

== Track listing ==
1. "One MC, One Delay" - 3:10
2. "Penguin" - 4:27
3. "Royalty" - 5:14
4. "Harlem Davidson" - 4:12
5. "Behind 16 Bars" - 2:52
6. "Salt Water" - 3:49
7. "Nightman" - 7:28
8. "Northbound" - 5:16
9. "Tokyo Ranger" - 4:25
10. "Nutwood Cut" - 4:00
11. "Two Reasons" - 3:39
12. "Jah Jah Blow Job" - 4:24
13. "Broken Daylight" - 7:15
