= Trio Töykeät =

Finnish jazz band

Trio Töykeät (founded in 1988) was a Finnish jazz trio. Their music ranges from humorous ragtimes to sentimental waltzes. Their playing style is often rhythmic, energetic and virtuosic. The group disbanded in 2008.

== Members ==
- Iiro Rantala – piano
- Rami Eskelinen – drums
- Eerik Siikasaari – double bass

== Releases ==
- Päivää (1990)
- G'day (1993) (international re-release of Päivää)
- Jazzlantis (1995)
- Rappiolla (1997)
- Sisu (1997)
- Kudos (2000)
- Music! (2002)
- High Standards (2003)
- Wake (2005)
- One Night in Tampere (2007)
