= Jonas W. Karlsson =

Finnish producer and songwriter

Jonas W. Karlsson is a Finnish producer and songwriter. He was with the Finnish band Elokuu, and worked with Madeline Juno. He is a longtime collaborator of Sofi de la Torre, with whom he wrote the song "Vermillion" (2014), a release praised by critics.

== Discography ==
=== As producer ===
- Another. Not Me. I'm Done (Sofi de la Torre, 2017)
