= Rami Eskelinen =

Finnish jazz drummer (born 1967)

Rami Eskelinen (born 14 August 1967 in Helsinki), is a Finnish jazz drummer who is probably best known as a member of Trio Töykeät, a Finnish jazz trio. He is also the drummer of Espoo Big Band, and actively teaches music in Espoo-based Pop/Jazz-school Ebeli. He played for Erja Lyytinen until 2010.
