= Don Johnson Big Band =

Finnish alternative hip hop group

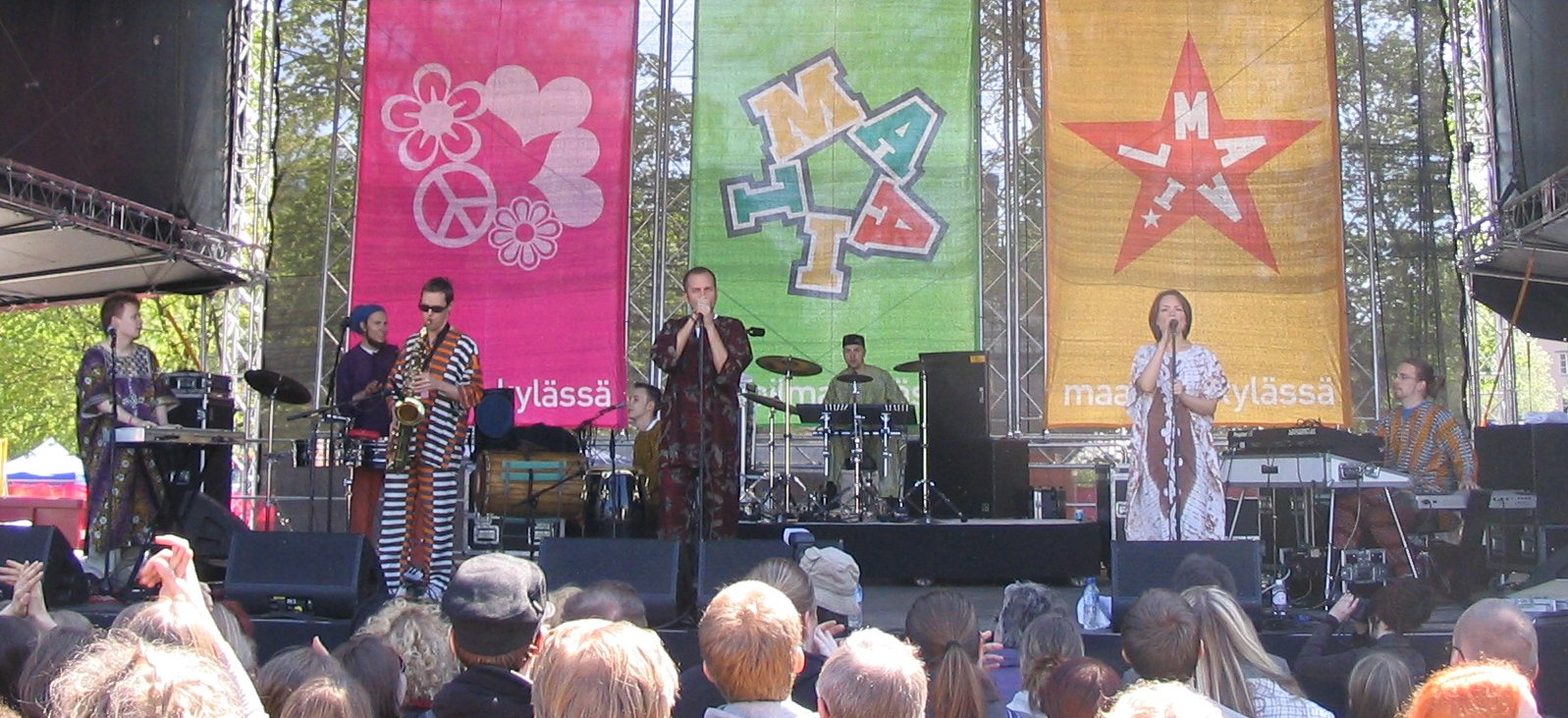
- Don Johnson Big Band performing in May 2006.

Background information
- Origin: Helsinki, Finland
- Genres: Alternative, Electronic, Hip hop
- Years active: 1997–present
- Labels: Universal Music, Beat Back
- Members: Tommy Lindgren; Johannes Laiho; Kari Saarilahti; Pekka Mikkonen
- Website: www.donjohnsonbigband.fi

Don Johnson Big Band is an alternative hip hop group from Helsinki, Finland. Their music blends influences from a variety of genres such as electronic music, funk, rock, jazz and hip hop.

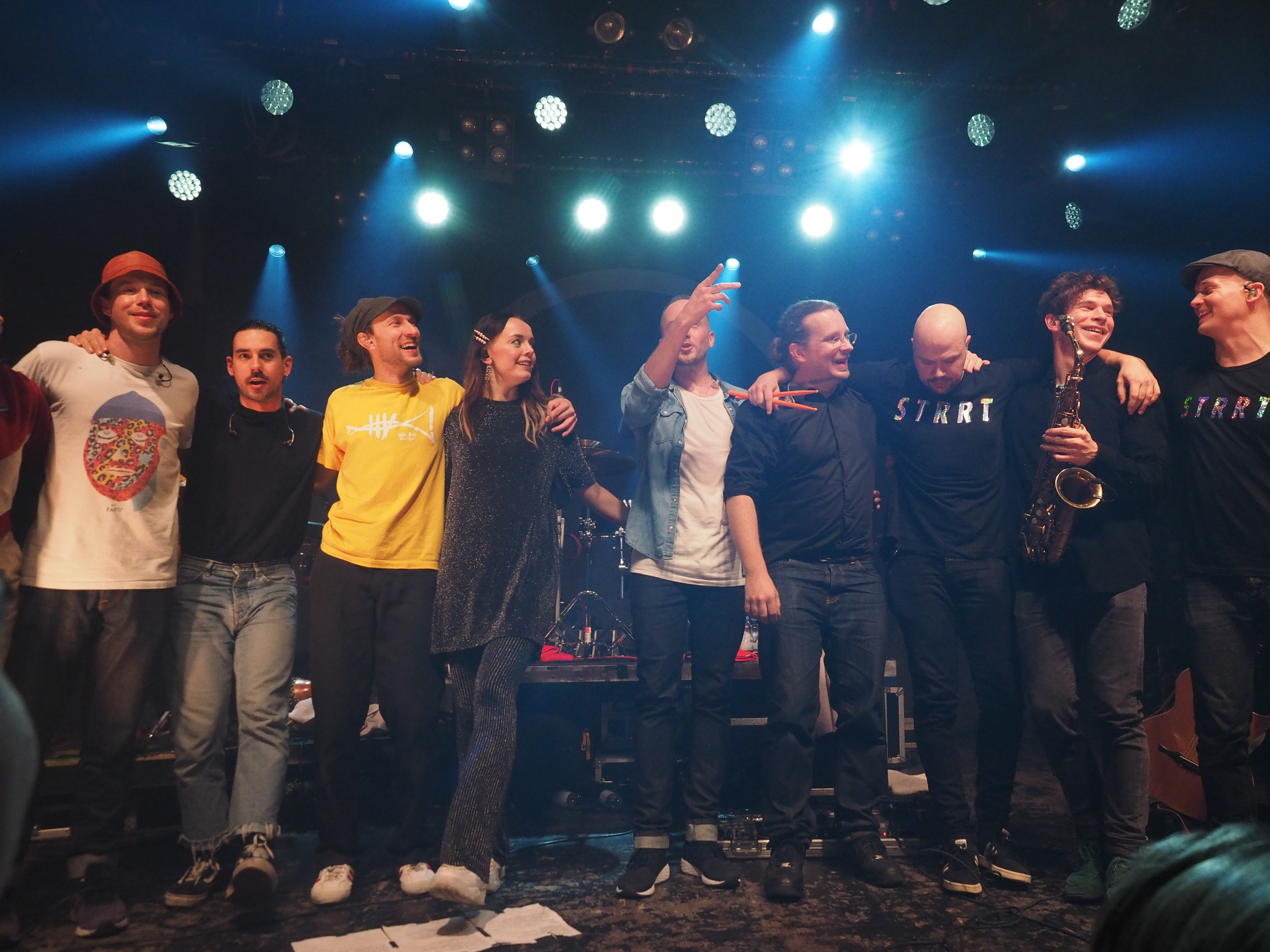
Don Johnson Big Band on a Christmas concert at the Tavastia Club

== History ==
The name "Don Johnson Big Band" comes from the actor Don Johnson in the series Miami Vice. The band had to come up with a name to reserve a place for training.

== Members ==
Don Johnson Big Band consists of four people: Tommy Lindgren (vocals), Kari Saarilahti (guitar), Johannes Laiho (keyboards) and Pekka Mikkonen (horns). Despite their name, they are not a big band, but instead a mix between rap, hip hop, techno, jazz, blues and rock. Regular featuring artists on DJBB gigs and albums are Juuso Hannukainen (percussion), Tero Rantanen (percussion), Emma Salokoski (vocals), and Teppo Mäkynen (turntables).

== Discography ==
=== Albums ===
- Support de Microphones (2000)
- Breaking Daylight (2003)
- Don Johnson Big Band (2006)
- Records Are Forever (2009)
- Fiesta (2012)
- Physical Digital (2018)
- Digital Physical (2022)
- Midnight Movement (2024)

=== Singles ===
Year	Title	Chart positions		Album
Year	Title	Peak position on Finnish Singles Chart	Weeks on chart	Album
2003	"One MC, One Delay"	2	19	Breaking Daylight
2003	"Jah Jah Blow Job"	4	6	Breaking Daylight
2006	"Road"	1	5	Don Johnson Big Band
2006	"Busy Relaxin'"	12	2	Don Johnson Big Band
2009	"L.L.H."	6	2	Records Are Forever

== Trivia ==
- Lindgren, Saarilahti and Laiho are old high school friends. Mikkonen joined in later.
- Their 2009 album includes a song dedicated to Usain Bolt, titled Running Man.
