= Support de Microphones =

Studio album by Don Johnson Big Band
- Released: 1 April 2000
- Genre: Hip hop
- Length: 73:09
- Label: Beat Back
- Producer: Don Johnson Big Band

Don Johnson Big Band chronology
Support de Microphones (2000)	Breaking Daylight (2003)

Support de Microphones is the debut album of Finnish hip hop group Don Johnson Big Band. With sales of 10,000 copies, the album is considered to be the best selling self-published album in Finland. Initially the album was also self-distributed, but later distributed by Sony Music.

== Track listing ==
1. "Intro" - 0:42
2. "Burn de Microphones" - 5:33
3. "Helsinki Cadenza" - 2:34
4. "Subway Stars" - 3:56
5. "Disco San Francisco" - 3:50
6. "Klaus Orbital" - 3:33
7. "Turbo Boost" - 4:20
8. "Get on the Mic" - 3:49
9. "Milano" - 6:15
10. "No. 1 at the Hamburg Concept" - 7:27
11. "Wonderful World" - 3:39
12. "Jesus Adidas" - 5:14
13. "Jass" - 5:46
14. "24h" - 3:21
15. "All Agents Operate Synchronously" - 3:43
16. "Illyrical" - 3:02
17. "Suru" - 6:25
