= Paleface (rapper) =

Finnish musician

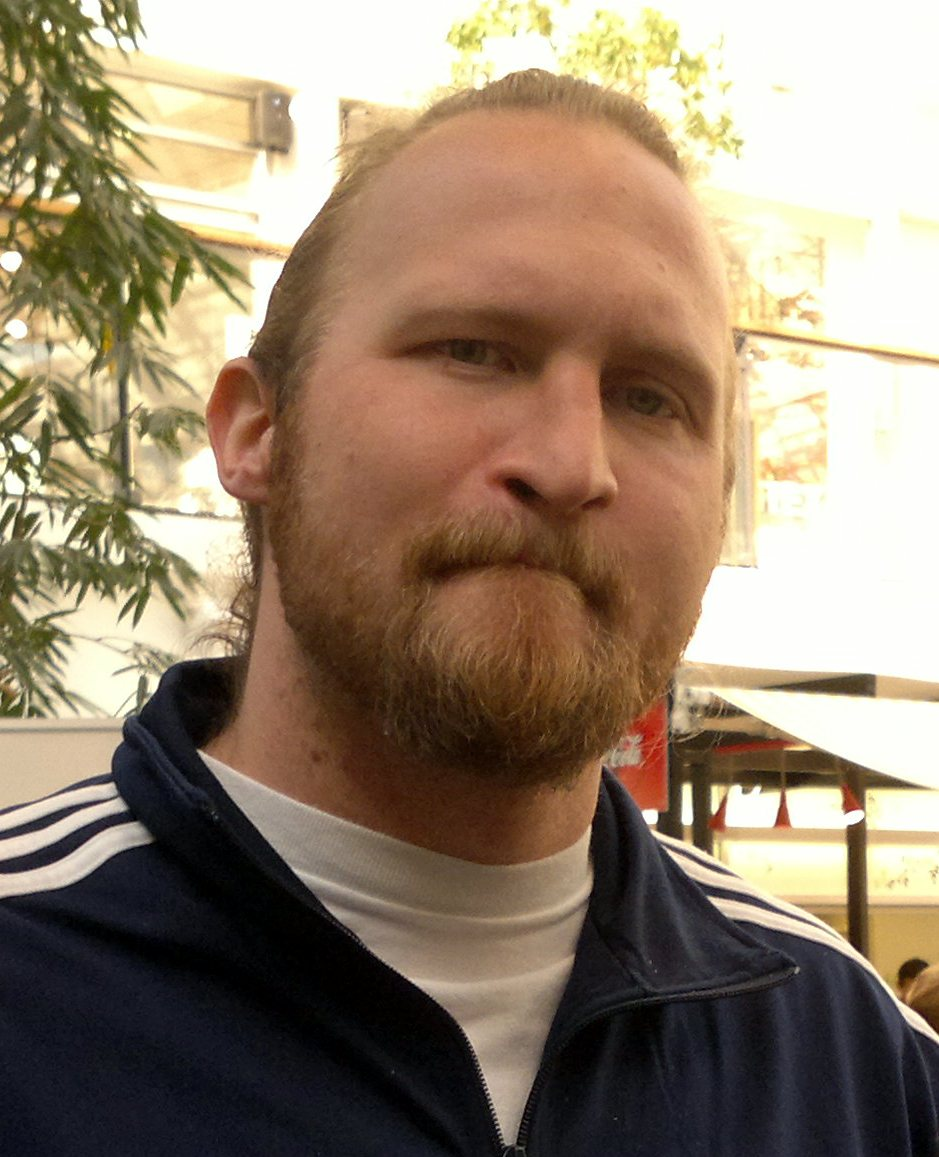
- Paleface in 2011

Background information
- Born: Karri Pekka Matias Miettinen; 21 April 1978 (age 48); Järvenpää, Finland
- Genres: Hip hop, political hip hop, folk
- Years active: 2000–present
- Labels: BMG Finland, XO

Karri Pekka Matias Miettinen (born 21 April 1978), better known by his stage name Paleface, is a Finnish hip hop musician.

== Discography ==
=== Albums ===
- The Pale Ontologist (2001)
- Quarter Past (2003)
- Studio Tan (2007)
- Helsinki–Shangri-La (2010)
- Palaneen käryä (2011)
- Maan tapa (2012)
- Food for the Gods (2013) with Matre
- Luova tuho (2014)
- Tie Vapauteen (2019) with Laulava Unioni
- Autofiktio (2023)

=== Singles ===
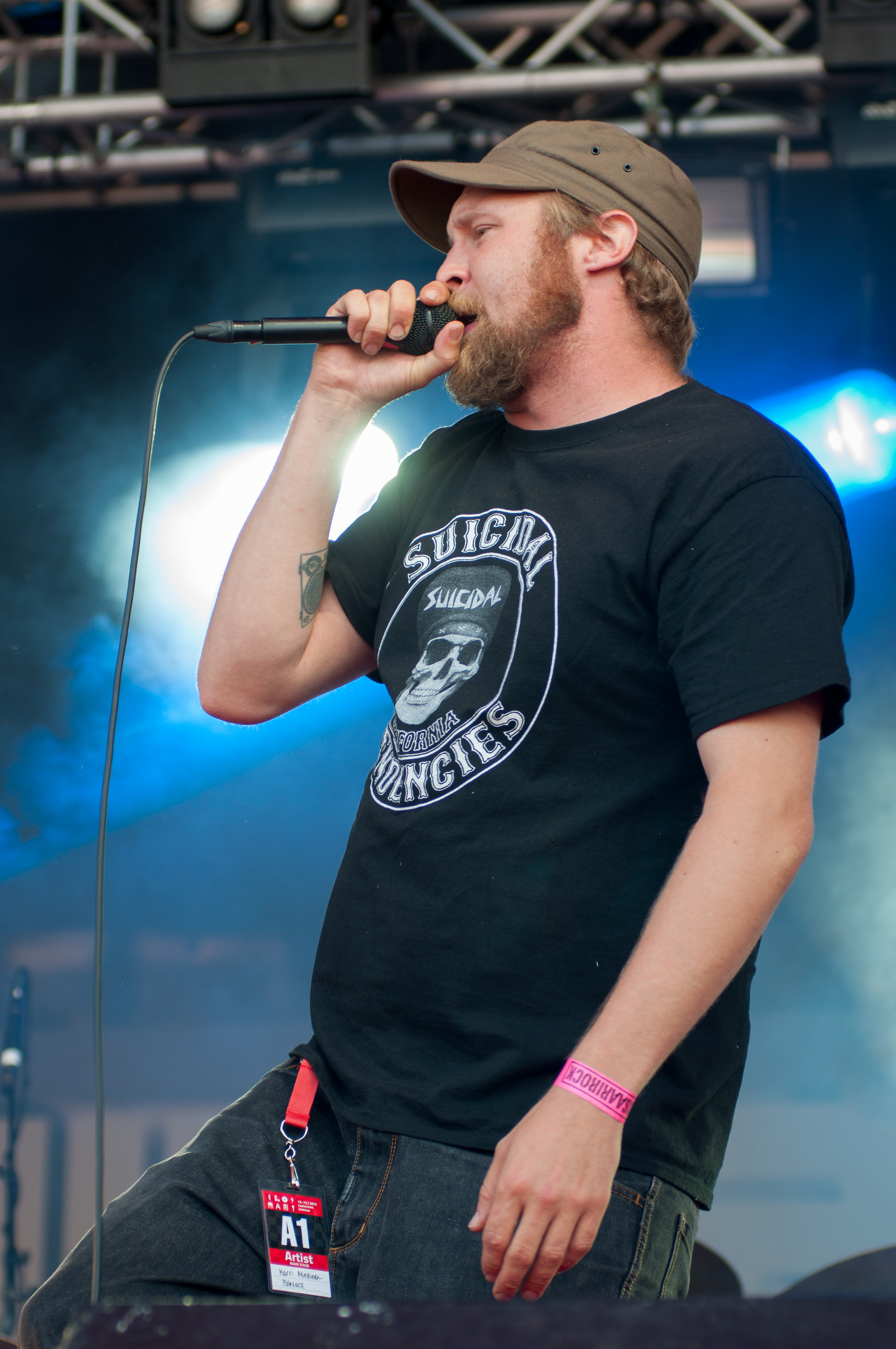
Paleface performing at the 2012 Ilosaarirock festival.

- "The Ultimate Jedi Mind Trick – Episode IV" (2000)
- "Back to Square One" (2000)
- "Maximize the Prophet" (2001)
- "Keep Hope a Lie" (2001)
- "Til' the Break of Dawn" (2003)
- "Colgate Soulmate" (2003)
- "Hellsinki Freezes Over" (2007)
- "Gently" (2007)
- "Merkit" (2010)
- "Talonomistaja" (2010)
- "Syntynyt rellestää" (2010)
- "Helsinki–Shangri-La" (2010)
- "Ikivanhat tekosyyt" (2012)
- "Miten historiaa luetaan?" (2012)
- "Muista!" feat. Redrama and Tommy Lindgren (2012)
- "Food for the Gods" (2013)
- "Mull' on lupa" (2014)
- "Snaijaa" feat. Tuomo (2014)
- "Palamaan (Pahan kukat)" (2016)
- "Emme suostu pelkäämään" (Loldiers Anthem) (2016)
- "Eteenpäin" feat. Iso H, Prinssi Jusuf and Jepa Lambert (2017)
- "Luonnonvoima" feat. Etta (2018)
- "Laulu sisällissodasta" feat. Ylioppilaskunnan Laulajat (2018)
- "Loukussa" (Helvi Juvonen/ mullan alta) (2019)
- "Surun suureen sieluun sain" feat. Petty Pilgrims (2019)
- "Aakkosmurha" (2019)
- "Käsi iskee" feat. DJ Massimo (2019)
- "Ahneus on hyvä" (2021)
- "Young" feat. Pete Santos (2022)
- "Miehet ei itke" (2022)
- "Malmin ääni" (2023)
- "Mikä susta tulee isona" feat. Ylva Haru (2023)
