= Hääväki saapuu =

Studio album by Elokuu
- Released: 6 April 2012
- Label: EMI, Capitol Records

Elokuu chronology
| Hääväki saapuu (2012) | Pöytä on katettu (2013) |

Singles from Hääväki saapuu
- 1. "Soutaa huopaa" 2. "Saatilla"; 3. "Kullankaivaja"

Hääväki saapuu is the debut album by Finnish band Elokuu. It was released on 6 April 2012. In its first week of release, the album peaked at number two on the Finnish Album Chart.

== Singles ==
Three singles were released from the album; "Soutaa huopaa" peaked at number two on the Finnish Singles Chart, while "Saatilla" reached number eight. The third single "Kullankaivaja" failed to chart. Accompanying music videos were released for each of the singles.

== Track listing ==
| No. | Title | Length |
|---|---|---|
| 1. | "Tänä yön" | 3:26 |
| 2. | "Soutaa huopaa" | 4:09 |
| 3. | "Saatilla" | 4:05 |
| 4. | "Kotiin" | 3:12 |
| 5. | "Kullankaivaja" | 3:44 |
| 6. | "Treffeillä" | 2:23 |
| 7. | "Legendaariset Levikset" | 2:50 |
| 8. | "Ota omena" | 4:30 |
| 9. | "Happamia marjoja" | 3:48 |
| 10. | "Perillä ennen pimeää" | 5:50 |
| 11. | "Onni on" | 2:29 |

== Chart performance ==
| Chart (2012) | Peak position |
|---|---|
| Finland (Suomen virallinen lista) | 2 |
