= Eerik Siikasaari =

Finnish jazz bassist (born 1957)

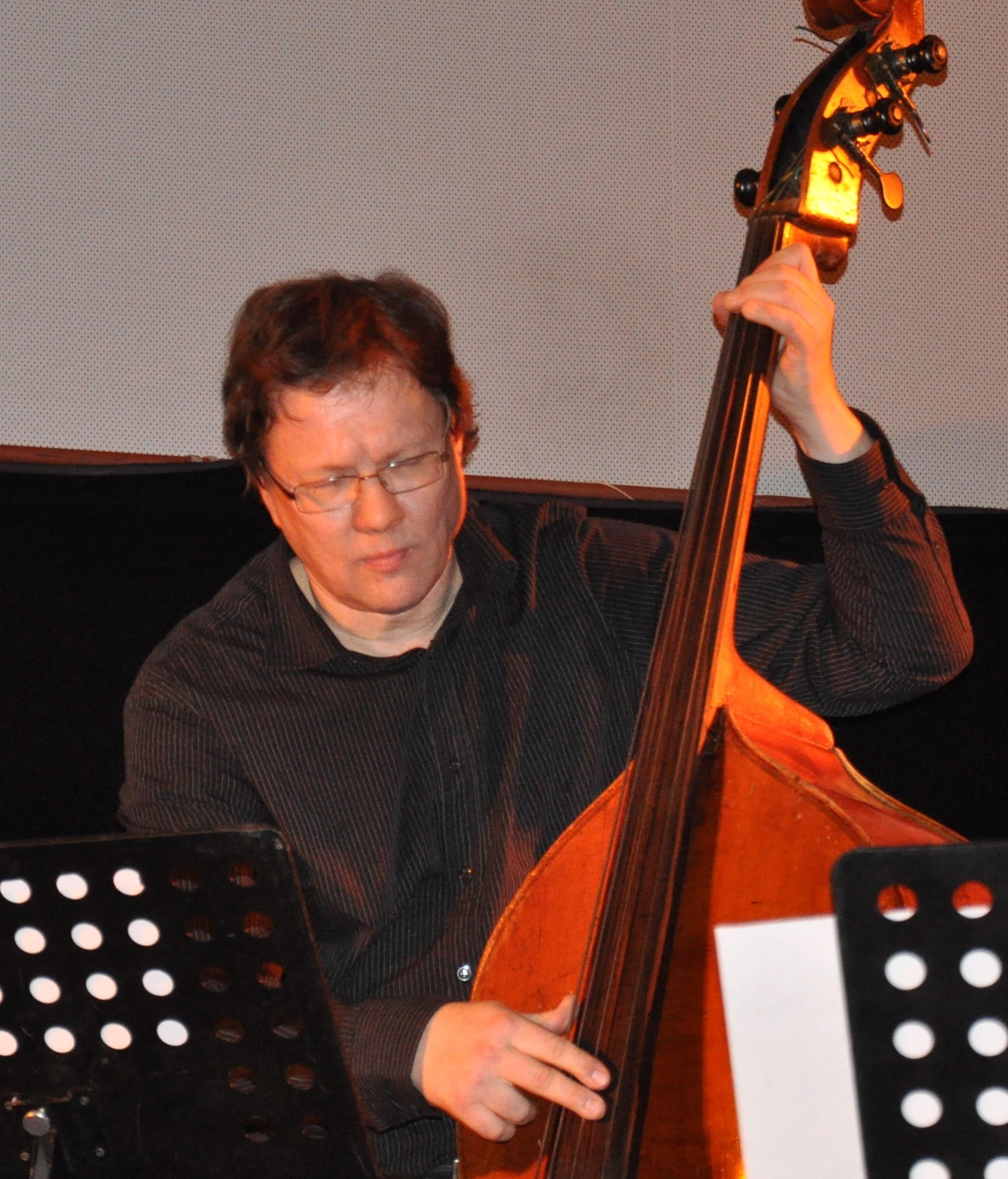
Eerik Siikasaari

Eerik Siikasaari (born 8 October 1957 in Finland) is a Finnish jazz bassist who is probably best known as a member of Trio Töykeät, a Finnish jazz trio. He is also the bassist of Espoo Big Band, and actively teaches music in Espoo-based Pop/Jazz-school Ebeli. Has won three minor awards in Finland.
