= G-Day =

Series of events held by Google

G-Day is a series of large-scale events held by Google in Latin America, Middle East, Africa and India for developers, tech enthusiasts and entrepreneurs. It started as a part of the G-Africa Initiative that was expanded to Latin America countries in 2012. These events typically lasted for two days, split into the developer day (for developers and technology enthusiasts) and the business day (for entrepreneurs) with the aim of showing them how to leverage Google tools in taking advantage of the opportunities offered by the Internet and mobile.

== Occurrences ==
It has been held seventeen times to date:

- G-Bangladesh 2014 (GDayX): April 12 in Dhaka,.
- G-Ghana 2014: Feb 18–19 in Accra, Ghana.
- G-Delhi 2012: Sep 13–14 in Delhi, India.
- G-Mumbai 2012: Sep 6–7 in Mumbai, India.
- G-Hyderabad 2012: Aug 21–22 in Hyderabad, India.
- G-Bangalore 2012: Aug 2–3 in Bangalore, India.
- G-Chennai 2012: Jul 19–20 in Chennai, India.
- G-Morocco 2012: Jun 7–8 in Mohammedia, Morocco.
- G-Côte d'Ivoire 2012: May 14–15 in Abidjan, Côte d'Ivoire.
- G-Senegal 2012: May 9–10 in Dakar, Senegal.
- G-México 2012: Apr 27 in Mexico City, Mexico.
- G-Saudi Arabia 2012: Mar 24–25 in Jeddah, Saudi Arabia.
- G-Ghana 2012: Mar 19–20 in Accra, Ghana.
- G-Nigeria 2012: Mar 15–16 in Lagos, Nigeria.
- G-Ethiopia 2012: Feb 7–8 in Addis Ababa, Ethiopia.
- G-Tanzania 2012: Feb 2–3 in Dar es Salaam, Tanzania.
- G-Angola 2011: Nov 8–9 in Luanda, Angola.
- G-South Africa 2011: Nov 3–4 in Johannesburg, South Africa.
- G-Kenya 2011: Sep in Nairobi, Kenia.
- G-Uganda 2011: Sep in Kampala, Uganda.
- G-Cameroon 2011: Jun 15–16 in Douala, Cameroon.
- G-Nigeria 2011: May 3–4 in Lagos, Nigeria.
- G-Ghana 2011: Apr 28–29 in Accra, Ghana.
- G-Senegal 2011: Feb 21–22 in Dakar, Senegal.
- G-South Africa 2010: in Cape Town, South Africa.
- G-Uganda 2010: in Kampala, Uganda.
- G-Kenya 2010: in Nairobi, Kenia.
- G-Ghana 2010: in Ghana.
- G-Nigeria 2010: Feb 18–20 in Lagos, Nigeria.
- G-Egypt 2010: Dec 9–11 in Cairo, Egypt.
- G-Sénégal 2009: Nov 20–21 in Dakar, Senegal.
- G-Mauritius 2009: Sep 3–4 in Mauritius.
