= Tuomo Prättälä =

Finnish singer

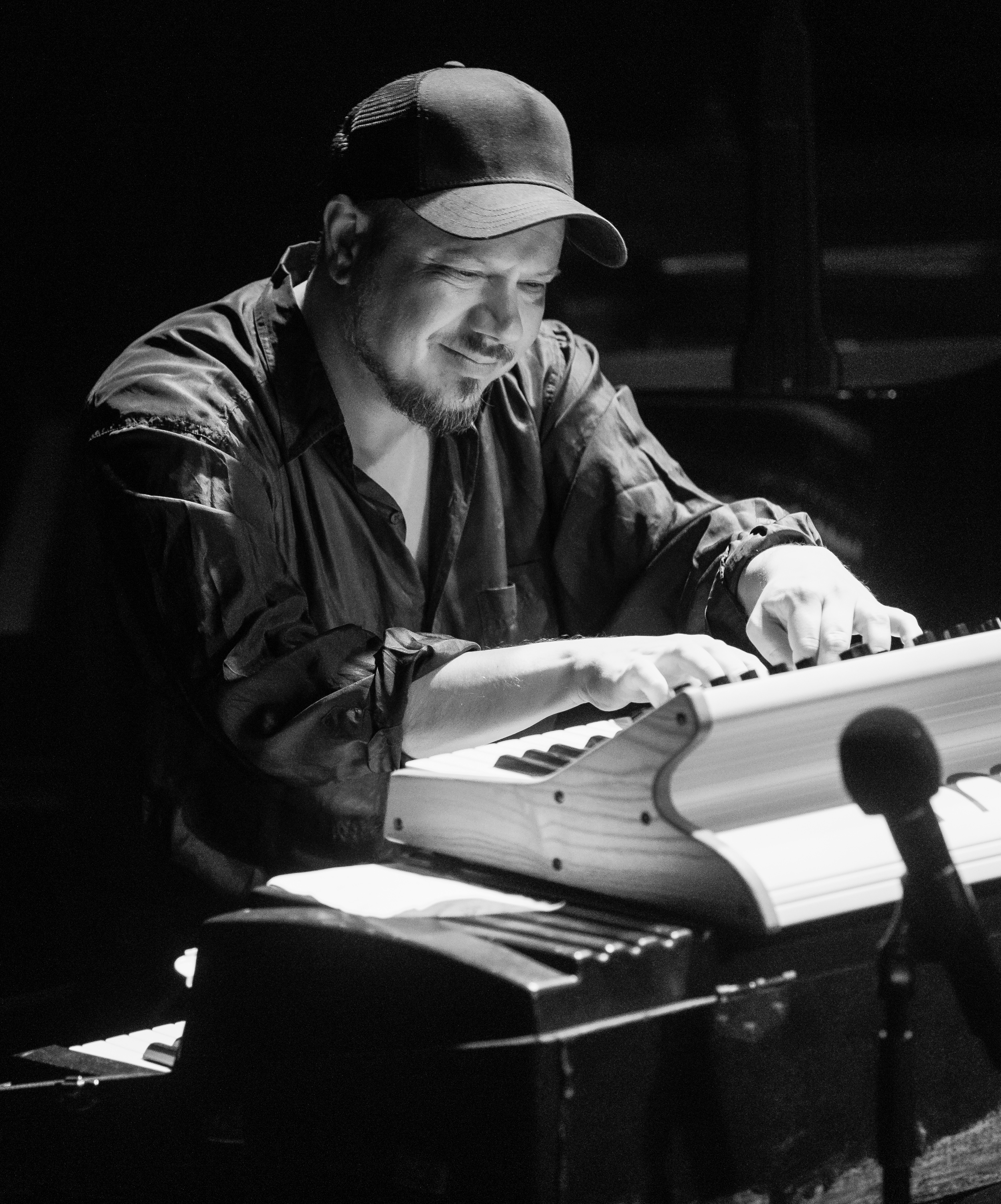
Tuomo Prättälä performing at Victoria Teater, Oslo 2023 Photo: Tore Sætre

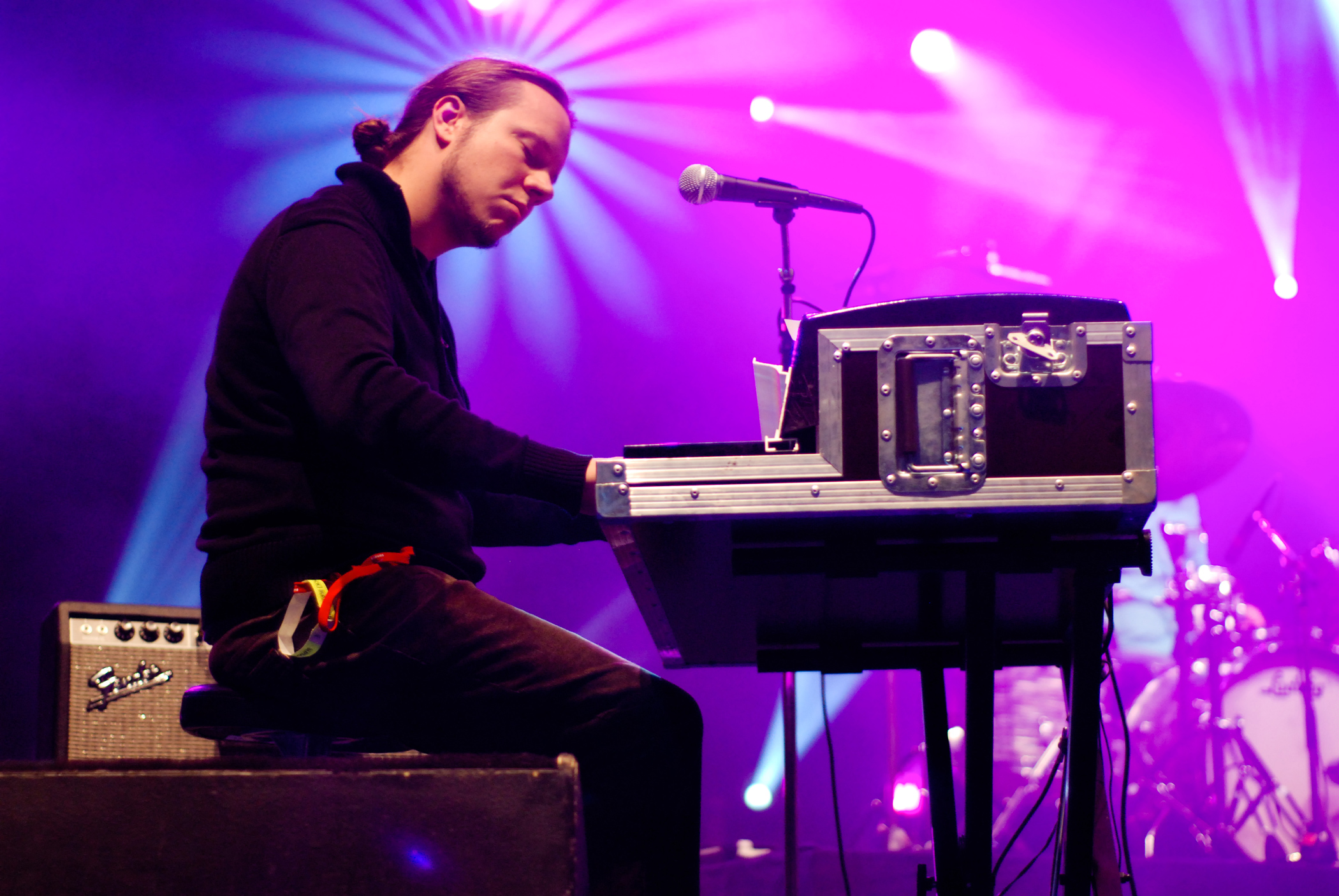
Tuomo Prättälä at Ilosaarirock 2007

Tuomo Prättälä also known by the mononym Tuomo (born 30 April 1979 in Helsinki) is a Finnish soul singer, musician, and composer. He sings and plays the piano and keyboards. He has been involved in a number of musical groups, including Quintessence, Q-Continuum, the Ilmiliekki Quartet, Huba, the Emma Salokoski Ensemble, and MP4, and has released a number of solo albums. In 2007, Prättälä won the Suomen Jazzliitto (Finnish Jazz Federation) for best Finnish jazz artist.

== Discography ==
=== Albums ===
(All albums credited as Tuomo)

Year	Album	Peak positions
Year	Album	FIN
2007	My Thing	8
2009	Reaches Out For You	2
2010	My Own Private Sunday	6
2014	The New Mystique	4
