= Levoton Tuhkimo =

Single by Dingo

from the album Nimeni on Dingo
- Released: 1984
- Genre: Rock
- Length: 4:12
- Producer: Pave Maijanen

Dingo singles chronology
"Sinä ja minä" (1984)	"Levoton Tuhkimo" (1984)	"Pistoolisankari" (1984)

Music video
- "Levoton Tuhkimo" on YouTube

"Levoton Tuhkimo" (Restless Cinderella) is a popular song released in 1984 by the Finnish rock band Dingo. It is part of the album Nimeni on Dingo (My name is Dingo) produced by Pave Maijanen under the Fazer Finnlevy music label. The song has been remixed twice, in 1992 and in 1993, and has been reinterpreted by Scandinavian Music Group in 2008 in their tributary album Melkein vieraissa – Nimemme on Dingo. Estonian artist Mari-Leen Kaselaan's song "Rahutu tuhkatriinu" is also based on "Levoton Tuhkimo".

The 2024 film about the band, My Name Is Dingo (Levoton Tuhkimo), is named after the song.

== Personnel ==
- Pertti Neumann (vocals)
- Jonttu Virta (guitar)
- Jarkko Eve (bass/vocals)
- Pete Nuotio (synthesiser)
- Juha Seittonen (drums)
