= Finnish Armed Forces radio alphabet =

Letter	Code word	Meaning
A	Aarne	male name
B	Bertta	female name
C	Celsius	Surname of Swedish scientist Anders Celsius
D	Daavid	male name
E	Eemeli	male name
F	Faarao	Finnish for pharaoh
G	Gideon	male name
H	Heikki	male name
I	Iivari	male name
J	Jussi	male name
K	Kalle	male name
L	Lauri	male name
M	Matti	male name
N	Niilo	male name
O	Otto	male name
P	Paavo	male name
Q	kuu	Finnish name for the letter q, also Finnish for Moon or moon
R	Risto	male name
S	Sakari	male name
T	Tyyne	female name
U	Urho	male name, also Finnish for brave (noun, i.e. 'someone who possesses courage' or a hero)
V	Vihtori	male name
W	Viski	Finnish for whisky
X	äksä	Finnish name for the letter x
Y	Yrjö	male name
Z	zeta	Finnish name for the letter z
Å	Åke	male name
Ä	äiti	mother
Ö	öljy	oil

The Finnish Defence Forces switched over to the NATO phonetic alphabet in 2005, but the Finnish one is used for Å, Ä, Ö, and digits. International operations use only the NATO alphabet.

On the Finnish rail network the Finnish Armed Forces spelling alphabet was used until May 31, 2020. Starting on July 1 the railways switched to NATO phonetic alphabet, but still retained Finnish spelling words for Å, Ä, Ö, and numbers.

== See also ==
- Radio alphabet
- Swedish Armed Forces' phonetic alphabet
