= Kerjäläisten valtakunta =

Studio album by Dingo
- Released: 14 March 1985
- Recorded: January – February 1985
- Studio: Takomo-studiot
- Genre: Suomirock, pop rock, new romantic
- Length: 39:01
- Language: Finnish
- Label: Fazer Finnlevy
- Producer: Pave Maijanen

Kerjäläisten valtakunta (The Kingdom of Beggars) is a 1985 album by the Finnish rock band Dingo. At the time of its release, it became the best-selling album in Finland in Finnish history so far, and still remains the fourth-best-selling album of all time in Finland. The album sold more copies than its predecessor Nimeni on Dingo and successor Pyhä klaani put together.

== Background ==
In the previous year, Dingo had published their debut album Nimeni on Dingo and risen to the ranks of the most popular bands in Finland. Because of an unprecedented hysteria surrounding the band, there was a constant demand for new music from the band. Despite the sudden rise in their popularity, the band was under no pressure to publish a new album. According to the band's leading member Pertti "Neumann" Nieminen, it was easy to write new material for the album. Neumann wrote new songs while on the bus, at his home and at the band's training room.

== Recording ==
The album was recorded at the Takomo studios in early 1985. During the time of recording, the so-called "Dingo hysteria" was at its peak and hundreds of fans set up camp outside the studio. The most enthusiastic fans tried to enter the studio through the windows. According to the later recollections of the album's producer Pave Maijanen, recording of Kerjäläisten valtakunta went easier than that of the band's debut album, as the sudden popularity of the band had made them more confident.

Unlike the band's first album, there were no demo versions of the tracks on Kerjäläisten valtakunta by the whole band. Instead, Neumann had recorded demo versions of the tracks played on acoustic guitar and sent these to producer Pave Maijanen before the actual recording. The band practiced on the album's track at Juha Seittonen's home in Pori. The album also included the track Autiotalo published in the previous September, which proved to be Dingo's final breakthrough.

== Reception ==
The album was a huge success and held the top spot of the Official Finnish Charts for a total of 11 weeks and remained on the list for 24 weeks after that. The album sold for gold, platinum and double platinum already in 1985. It was Finland's most sold domestic record from 1985 to 1988. By 2013, it had sold a total of 190,894 copies making it Finland's fourth most sold domestic album of all time and the band's best album.

The demand for the album was so high that the record company had to send 55 thousand pre-ordered copies to buyers before the album was officially published. Sales of the album continued at a pace of 10 to 20 thousand copies per day.

The album's huge popularity among girls and young women gave Dingo a reputation of a "band for girls". This caused many boys and men to try to keep the fact that they liked the album as a secret, despite some of the tracks (in particular Valkoiset tiikerit and Rio ohoi) sounding more like heavy metal or rock and roll than romantic ballads appealing to girls.

== Cover art ==
The cover art for the album was based on photographs taken of the band in Agadir, Morocco. The band's manager Lasse Norres made an agreement with the travel company Lomamatkat that the travel company would pay for a trip to Morocco for the band, Norres, the photographer and all of their wives and girlfriends. In return, Lomamatkat received a mention of this cooperation on the album cover. The logo of a commercial sponsor appearing on an album cover was unprecedented in the middle 1980s.

The photographer Kari Riipinen took about three thousand pictures of the band. Riipinen was originally opposed to the idea of the photoshoot, claiming he preferred to photograph bands such as Hanoi Rocks, but the band's manager Lasse Norres convinced him to go. After listening to a pre-release version of the album on cassette tape at a hotel room in Morocco Riipinen became so enamoured of the band's music that his emotional reactions kept Norres awake at night.

As the "Dingo hysteria" was at its peak in 1985, the trip to Morocco had to be made in secret from the public. However, the magazine Seura got to know about the trip and sent Ilkka Isosaari, one of their journalists to write a story about it. Norres and the band met Isosaari already at the Helsinki-Vantaa Airport in the morning before boarding their flight. This caused instant friction between Norres and Isosaari as Norres thought Isosaari's presence would only interfere with the photoshoot in Morocco.

The trip to Morocco went mainly well despite a couple of individual incidents. There was an incident at the Djema el-Fna ("Story-tellers' square") market square in Marrakesh where local men started surrounding the band members and patting them on the behind. Lasse Norres has later speculated that the local men thought the band members with their heavy make-up were women. The incident was resolved when a local police patrol intervened. Norres had to explain to the police that this was a famous rock'n'roll band from Finland that had come to Morocco for a photoshoot for their new album.

When the band returned to Finland, they found that hundreds of their fans had set up camp at the airport. The numerous fans present made it difficult to move around. Lasse Norres compared the situation to the "Beatlemania" phenomenon that had surrounded the Beatles in the 1960s.

The band and their entourage had to resort to special measures to avoid contact with hysterical fans. The band were directed off to the side as soon as they stepped in to the airport lobby and were transported to a few kilometres away from the airport by police car. Despite the police transport, the most enthusiastic fans did not give up but instead ran after the police car. According to Lasse Norres, these special measures were made in such a hurry that there was no time to even check the band's luggage or their passports.

Underneath the Finnish name of the album is the same name in Arabic written in mirror writing.

== Later reputation ==
Kerjäläisten valtakunta is Dingo's most successful album of all time. It was also the most sold domestic album in Finland from 1985 to 1988.

In 2006 Neumann said that Kerjäläisten valtakunta was the most whole of all of his records.

== Editions ==
The album was published under the "Kräk!" label of the record company Finnlevy on vinyl, compact disc and cassette tape. In 1994 Musiikki-Fazer republished the album on CD and cassette. In 2006 the album was published as part of the band's collection album Kunnian päivät 1983–1986. In 2012 the Warner Music Group published a new CD edition of the album. In 2022 the Finnish record store Levykauppa Äx published a new vinyl edition of the album, limited to 300 copies, under its own label "Lipposen levy ja kasetti".

== Track listing ==
No.	Title	Length
1.	"Valkoiset tiikerit" (White Tigers)	3:23
2.	"Rio ohoi" (Rio Ahoy)	3:52
3.	"Tuulen viemää" (Gone with the Wind)	4:40
4.	"Nahkatakkinen tyttö" (The Girl in the Leather Jacket)	3:04
5.	"Autiotalo" (Deserted House)	4:20
6.	"Kerjäläisten valtakunta" (The Kingdom of Beggars)	4:29
7.	"Kirjoitan" (I Am Writing)	4:10
8.	"Kulkuri ja kaunotar" (The Tramp and the Beauty)	4:10
9.	"Valomerkki" (Last Call)	3:41
10.	"Hämähäkkimies" (Spiderman)	3:42

The opening track Valkoiset tiikerit includes a sample of an adhan at a mosque at its start. The sample says 'ašhadu 'anna Muḥammadan rasūlu -llāhi (أَشْهَدُ أَنَّ مُحَمَّدًا رَسُولُ ٱللَّٰهِ), meaning "I testify that Muhammad is the messenger of God".

== Certifications ==
Region	Certification	Certified units/sales
Finland (Musiikkituottajat)	Platinum	190,894

== Personnel ==
- Neumann: vocals
- Keijo Q: drums
- Pepe Laaksonen: bass guitar, vocals
- Jonttu Virta: guitar, flute
- Pete Nuotio: keyboards, flute

=== Production ===
- Pave Maijanen: producer
- Dan Tigerstedt: recording (January to February 1985, Takomo studios), mixing
- Timo Lindström: producer in chief
- Gogh / Riipinen: cover art (Hasselblad 500 C/M)
- Pauli Saastamoinen: mastering of 1994 CD edition (Finnvox studios, 1994)
- Joona Lukala / Noise for Fiction - vinyl mastering of 2022 LP edition
- Ville Angervuori - layout of 2022 edition

== See also ==
- List of best-selling albums in Finland

== Bibliography ==
- Dimery, Robert (ed.): 1001 albumia jotka jokaisen on kuultava edes kerran eläessään (1001 Albums You Must Hear Before You Die). Editor for Finnish edition: Jake Nyman. Translators: Esa Kuloniemi et al. Helsinki, WSOY 2010. ISBN 978-951-0-36217-4
