= Niilo =

Male given name

Niilo is a male given name. People named Niilo include:

- Niilo Halonen (1940–2025), Finnish ski jumper
- Niilo Jääskinen (born 1958), Finnish lawyer and politician
- Niilo Mäenpää (born 1998), Finnish footballer
- Niilo Paasivirta, Finnish internet personality
- Niilo Saarikivi (born 2003), Finnish footballer
- Niilo Sevänen (born 1979), Finnish death metal musician
- Niilo Tammisalo, Finnish influential sports figure
- Niilo Wälläri (1897–1967), Finnish Socialist, syndicalist leader
- Niilo Yli-Vainio (1920–1981), Finnish Pentecostal leader

As a surname

- Tiit Niilo (born 1962), Estonian politician

== See also ==
- 2972 Niilo (1939 TB), a Main-belt Asteroid discovered in 1939
