= In Your Face =

In Your Face may refer to:

== Music ==
- In Your Face (Fishbone album), 1986
- In Your Face (Kingdom Come album), 1989
- In Your Face 1982–1990, a 2007 compilation album by the band Smack
- In Your Face, a 2003 album by b4-4
- "In Your Face", a song by Cat Power from her 2018 album Wanderer
- "In Your Face", a song by Children of Bodom from their 2005 album Are You Dead Yet?
- "In Your Face", a song by Lil Wayne from his 2009 album Rebirth
- "In Your Face", a song by Sadus from their 1990 album Swallowed in Black
- "In Your Face", a song by Ty Herndon from his 1995 debut album What Mattered Most
- "In Yo Face", a song by Unk from his 2008 album 2econd Season
- "In Yer Face", released in 1991 by 808 State

== Other ==
- In Your Face, the title given to the 1977 blaxploitation film Abar, the First Black Superman when it was released on VHS in 2009
