= Paasivirta =

Paasivirta is a Finnish surname. 'Paasi' means stone, 'virta' stream. Notable people with the surname include:

- Juhani Paasivirta (1919–1993), Finnish historian
- Niilo Paasivirta, Finnish internet personality
