= Live Desire =

Live album by Smack
- Released: 1986
- Recorded: Tavastia Klubi ja Husulan Casino, 1986
- Genre: Garage rock / Glam rock
- Label: Cityboy
- Producer: T.T.Oksala

Smack chronology
Rattlesnake Bite (1985)	Live Desire (1986)	Salvation (1987)

Live Desire is the Finnish rock band Smack's first live album. It was released in 1986. It was recorded in September 1986 from two live performances in Finland at the legendary Tavastia Club in Helsinki and in Hamina, Husulas Casino, Finland.

Live Desire captured the bands brutal energy and it covers best of their early material. The album also includes cover version of Stooges classic "Search and Destroy" and The Doors classic "Maggie M'Gill". The gorgeous gatefold sleeve, featuring Claude on the cover and a collage of live shots within, is easily the band's best album packaging.

== Track list ==
1. "Some Fun"
2. "(I Think I'm Gonna) Buy This Town"
3. "Run Rabbit Run"
4. "Pass That Bottle"
5. "Walkin' On The Wire"
6. "Cemetery Walls"
7. "Somewhere Out Of The Day"
8. "Maggie McGill"
9. "Ten Foot Cell"
10. "Good Mornin' Headache"
11. "Rattlesnake Bite"
12. "Black Bird"
13. "Search And Destroy"

== Line-up ==
- Claude - vocals
- Manchuria - guitar
- Rane - guitar
- Jimi Sero - bass
- Kinde - drums
