= Rattlesnake Bite =

Studio album by Smack
- Released: 1985
- Recorded: 1985, Finvox Studios, Helsinki
- Genres: Garage rock, Glam rock, Punk rock, Post punk, Psychedelia
- Label: Cityboy
- Producer: T.T.Oksala

Smack chronology
Smack On You (1984)	Rattlesnake Bite (1985)	Live Desire (1986)

Singles from Native Tongue
- 1. "Stepping Stone" Released: October 1985; 2. "Paint it Black" Released: April 1986

Rattlesnake Bite is the Finnish rock band Smack's second studio album. It was released in 1985, offering a more refined musical style than their punk rock debut Smack On You. The music is a mix of punk rock, psychedelia, glam rock, hard rock and post punk. Notable tracks include the ballad "Somewhere Out of the Day," and the intense interpretation of The Monkees "I’m Not Your Stepping Stone."

Rattlesnake Bite were later released in the U.S. on Enigma Records. A remastered version released in 1998 included 5 bonus tracks.

== Track list ==
=== Original album ===
1. "Stepping Stone" (Boyce, Hart) 2:37
2. "Roses Have Faded" (Manchuria, Claude) 3:58
3. "Nearby the Hangingtree" (Manchuria, Claude) 3:20
4. "Rattlesnake Bite" (Manchuria, Rane, Claude) 3:24
5. "Somewhere Out of the Day" (Manchuria, Claude) 3:53
6. "Weird Is the Sea" (Manchuria, Claude) 2:48
7. "Pass That Bottle" (Manchuria, Claude) 2:27
8. "Shade of the Blade" (Manchuria, Claude) 4:37
9. "Oh Lord" (Manchuria, Claude) 3:10
10. "On the Run" (Manchuria) 2:58
11. "Ice Drops" (Manchuria, Claude) 2:57

=== 1998 bonus tracks ===
1. "Paint It Black" (Mick Jagger, Keith Richards) 3:15
2. "Black Bird" (Manchuria, Claude) 3:41
3. "Buy This Town" (Manchuria, Claude) 3:09
4. "Maggie McGill" (Live) (Jim Morrison) 4:33
5. "Search and Destroy" (Live) (Iggy Pop, James Williamson)

=== Single ===
1. " Stepping Stone " (Boyce/Hart) 2:37
2. " Somewhere Out Of The Day " (Manchuria, Claude) 3:53

== Line-up ==
- Claude – vocals
- Manchuria – guitar
- Rane – guitar
- Cheri – bass
- Kinde – drums
