= My Name Is Dingo =

- Directed by: Mari Rantasila
- Written by: Hanna Leivonniemi
- Produced by: Marko Talli; Anni Pänkäälä
- Cinematography: Sari Aaltonen
- Edited by: Hanna Kuirinlahti
- Music by: Timo Kämäräinen
- Production company: Yellow Film & TV
- Distributed by: Nordisk Film
- Release date: December 25, 2024 (Finland)
- Running time: 88 minutes
- Country: Finland
- Language: Finnish
- Budget: €1.75 million (Finnish Film Foundation support €635,000)

My Name Is Dingo (Finnish: Levoton Tuhkimo) is a 2024 Finnish biographical drama film directed by Mari Rantasila and written by Hanna Leivonniemi. The film is inspired by the rise of the Finnish rock band Dingo and particularly its lead singer Pertti Neumann.

The film was produced by Yellow Film & TV and distributed theatrically by Nordisk Film. Broadcasting rights were acquired by Yle.

Original Dingo vocalist Pertti Neumann appears in a supporting role.

== Production ==
Principal photography began in Pori in September 2023 and later continued in Helsinki.

== Release ==
The world premiere was held in Pori on 20 November 2024. The Finnish theatrical release followed on 25 December 2024.

The film was also released theatrically in Estonia in early 2025.

By 28 October 2025, the film had sold 193,008 tickets in Finland.

== Cast ==
- Saku Taittonen as Pertti Neumann
- Alvari Stenbäck as Pepe Laaksonen
- Mauno Terävä as Jarkko Eve
- Samuel Kujala as Pete Nuotio
- Emil Kihlström as Jonttu Virta
- Valtteri Lehtinen as Juha Seittonen
- Ronja Keiramo as Marika
- Reino Nordin as Pave Maijanen
- Elias Salonen as Lasse Norres

== Reception ==
Levoton Tuhkimo received mixed reviews from critics. Several reviewers criticized the film for offering a superficial portrayal of Dingo’s career.

Others praised its depiction of 1980s Finland, production design, and makeup, as well as Saku Taittonen’s performance as Neumann.

Former Dingo manager Lasse Norres publicly criticized the film, stating that it portrayed him inaccurately.

== Soundtrack ==
- Musiikkia elokuvasta Levoton Tuhkimo (2024)
