= Eemeli =

Eemeli is a Finnish masculine given name. The given name Eemeli is shared by the following notable people:

- Eemeli (real name Esko Toivonen), Finnish actor, comedian and entertainer
- Eemeli Aakula, Finnish politician
- Eemeli Heikkinen, Finnish professional ice hockey player
- Eemeli Kouki, Finnish volleyball player
- Eemeli Paronen, Finnish smallholder and politician
- Eemeli Peltonen, Finnish politician
- Eemeli Raittinen, Finnish footballer
- Eemeli Reponen, Finnish professional football coach and a former player
- Eemeli Salomäki, Finnish pole vaulter
- Eemeli Suomi, Finnish ice hockey player
- Eemeli Virta, Finnish professional footballer
