= Sale (chain store) =

Finnish supermarket chain

- Formerly: S-ale
- Company type: Subsidiary
- Industry: Retail
- Founded: 1989; 37 years ago
- Headquarters: Finland
- Number of locations: 300 (2024)
- Products: Groceries
- Owner: S Group
- Website: Sale

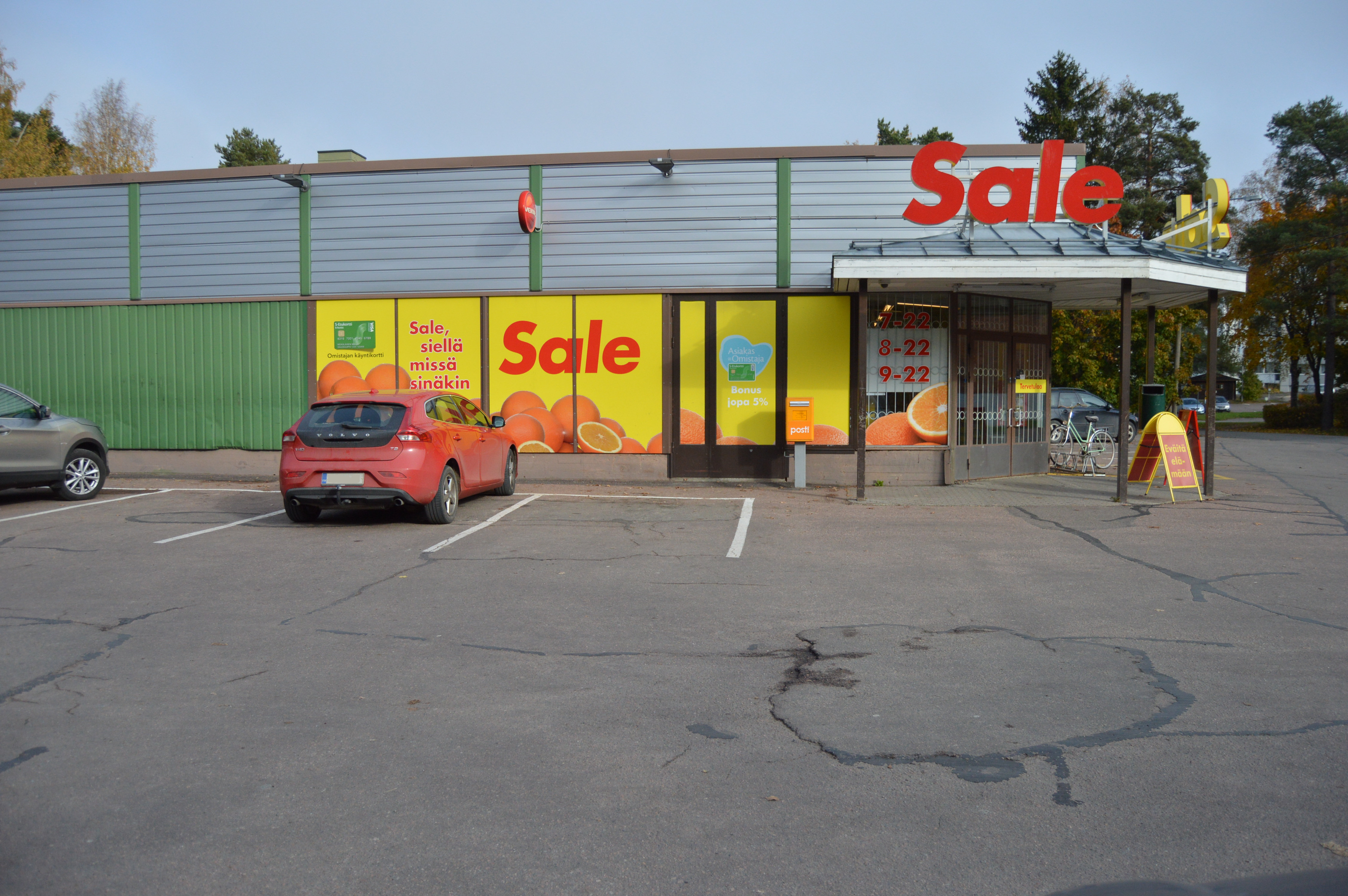
Sale in Husula, Hamina.

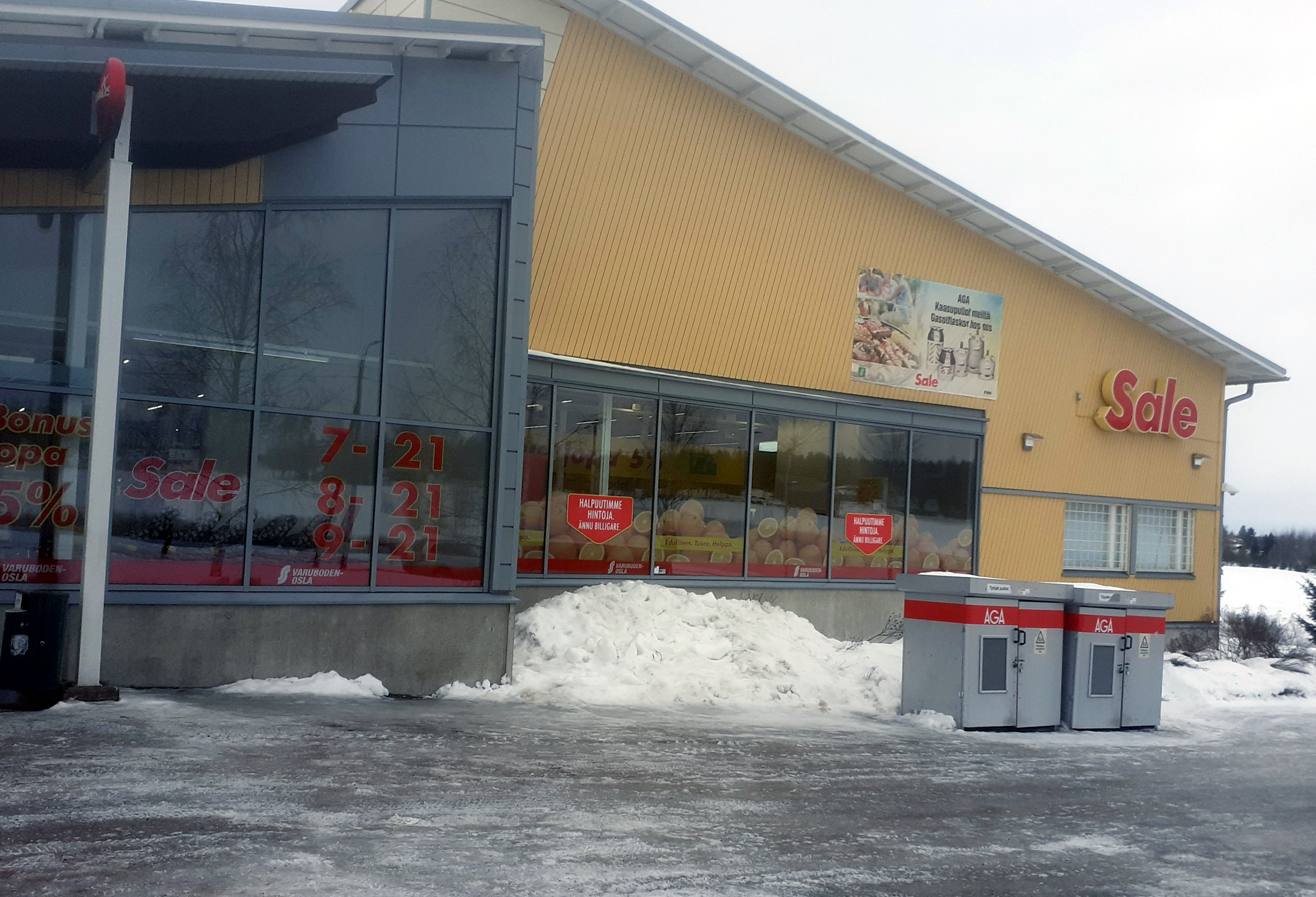
Sale in Kirveskoski, Pornainen.

Sale (Finnish: [ˈsɑle]) is a grocery shop chain in Finland, owned by the S Group. The chain was founded in 1989, when the S Group had begun to consolidate its stores under national chains. Initially, the chain was called S-ale. Before that, Sales replaced the former small S-stores that were not part of any chain. As of 2024, the chain has 300 stores in Finland.

Sale's stores are typically located in the countryside, small towns and suburbs, however it is not uncommon to see them in larger cities, like Jyväskylä and Kuopio. The stores have a range of 1,700-3,000 products, mainly focused on food and hygiene products. In the Helsinki metropolitan area, the S Group uses the brand Alepa for similar stores.
