= Search and Destroy (The Stooges song) =

- Promo single label

Single by Iggy and the Stooges

from the album Raw Power
- B-side: "Penetration"
- Released: June 1973
- Genre: Garage rock; glam rock; proto-punk; hard rock
- Length: 3:26
- Label: Columbia
- Songwriters: Iggy Pop; James Williamson
- Producers: Iggy Pop; David Bowie

"Search and Destroy" is a song by American rock band the Stooges, recorded for the group's third album Raw Power (1973). Lead singer Iggy Pop said that the title was derived from a column heading in a Time article about the Vietnam War.

In 1997, "Search and Destroy" (along with the rest of the songs on Raw Power) was remixed and remastered by Pop and Bruce Dickinson. The result was far more aggressive and stripped down than the original release, which had been mixed by David Bowie.

In 2004, Rolling Stone ranked "Search and Destroy" at No. 468 on their list of "The 500 Greatest Songs of All Time". In 2009, it was named the 49th best hard rock song of all time by VH1. The song has also been characterized as garage rock, glam rock, proto-punk and hard rock.

== Influence ==
In a song review for AllMusic, Bill Janovitz commented on the song's influence:

With "Search and Destroy," the Stooges lay down an archetype for punk rock: [Stooges' guitarist] James Williamson blistering through a bastardized and pumped-up Keith Richards guitar riff; Ron Asheton, having been relegated from guitar to bass, pounds the instrument with ferocity, while his brother, Scott Asheton, pummels the drum set like Keith Moon – all fills and cymbals ... One can hear the influence of the song in a myriad of bands that followed: the Sex Pistols, the Ramones, Motörhead, the Dead Boys (who covered it), and Nirvana.

Janovitz also notes that the song has become a popular live punk performance piece for bands such as Red Hot Chili Peppers, Sid Vicious, the Dictators, and KMFDM.

== Covers ==
Australian punk band Radio Birdman performed a high energy cover version during a set at the Marryatville Hotel recorded for TV by the Australian Broadcasting Corporation (ABC) in 1977.

Finnish band Smack played the song in their gig at Husulan Kasino 26 September 1986 and it has been recorded on their live album Live Desire.

Former Chemlab vocalist Jared Louche covered the song with The Aliens for his 1999 solo debut Covergirl.

Emanuel covered the song for the Tony Hawk's American Wasteland original soundtrack in 2005.

Canadian artist Peaches was picked by Iggy Pop to cover the song for the charity compilation album War Child Presents Heroes Vol. 1, released in 2009.

Skunk Anansie covered the song for the Sucker Punch soundtrack.

Industrial metal band Ministry, joined by guitarist Billy Morrison and bassist David Ellefson, covered the track on their 2021 album Moral Hygiene.

Indie rock band Florence and the Machine covered the song on the deluxe edition of their 2022 album Dance Fever.

Red Hot Chili Peppers covered the song on The Beavis and Butt-Head Experience.

Soundgarden covered the song on Live on I-5.

Shotgun Messiah covered the song for the 1992 EP I want More.

EMF covered the song for their 1992 EP Unexplained.

== Personnel ==
- Iggy Pop – vocals
- James Williamson – guitar
- Ron Asheton – bass guitar
- Scott Asheton – drums
