= Salvation (Smack album) =

Studio album by Smack
- Released: 1987
- Recorded: 1986
- Studios: Trident Studios, UK
- Genres: Garage rock, glam rock
- Label: Eden
- Producer: T.T.Oksala

Smack chronology
Live Desire (1986)	Salvation (1987)	Radical (1988)

Singles from Salvation
- 1. "Look Around" Released: January 1987; 2. "The Only Salvation" Released: 1987

Salvation is the third studio album by Finnish rock band Smack. It was recorded at Trident Studios, London, UK and released in 1987. The band was unhappy with the final mix and production on Salvation, but the album shot to #2 on Finnish charts and marked the band's biggest commercial success in Finland.

== Track listing ==
1. "The Only Salvation"
2. "Set My Love On You"
3. "Hellhounds On My Tail"
4. "Moonshine Chile"
5. "Trust On You"
6. "Look Around"
7. "Built to Destroy"
8. "Blinded by the Light"
9. "Johnny the Pusher"
10. "Wilderness"

=== Singles ===
- "Look Around"
- "The Only Salvation"

== Personnel ==
- Claude – vocals
- Manchuria – guitar
- Rane – guitar
- Jimi Sero – bass
- Kinde – drums
