= Radical (Smack album) =

Studio album by Smack
- Released: 1988
- Recorded: Finnvox Studios, Helsinki 1988
- Genres: Garage rock, glam rock
- Label: CBS
- Producer: Pave Maijanen

Smack chronology
Salvation (1987)	Radical (1988)	Two Originals – Salvation & Radical (1992)

Singles from Radical
- 1. "Mad Animal Shuffle" Released: 1988; 2. "I Want Somebody" Released: 1988; 3. "Little Sister" Released: 1988

Radical is the fourth and final studio album by Finnish rock band Smack. It was released in 1988.

Smack had recorded early demos for the album with British music producer Jim Pembroke, but it was Pave Maijanen who was selected by the band to produce "Radical". The album may not have reached the same level of success as their previous punk rock albums, but it still contained standout tracks like "Set Me Free," "Little Sister," and "Mad Animal Shuffle" Album offered a more refined musical style with blues influence

== Singles ==
- "Mad Animal Shuffle"
- "I Want Somebody"

== Track listing ==
=== Original album ===
1. "Set Me Free"
2. "I Want Somebody"
3. "Little Sister"
4. "Mad About You"
5. "You're All I Have"
6. "Mad Animal Shuffle"
7. "Street Hog Blues"
8. "Wonderful Ride"
9. "Strange Kinda Fever"
10. "Russian Fields"

== Personnel ==
- Claude – vocals
- Manchuria (guitarist) – guitar
- Rane (guitarist) – guitar
- Jimi Sero – bass
- Kinde (drummer) – drums
