= Smack On You =

Studio album by Smack
- Released: 1984
- Recorded: 1984
- Studios: Finnvox Studios, Helsinki, Finland
- Genres: Garage rock; punk rock
- Length: 34:19
- Label: Cityboy
- Producer: T.T.Oksala

Smack chronology
Smack On You (1984)	Rattlesnake Bite (1985)

Singles from Smack On You
- 1. "Criminal" / "Little C**t" Released: April 1985

Smack On You is the debut album by Finnish rock band Smack, released in 1984. The album is considered one of the most influential punk rock albums in Finnish rock music history. The album was produced by T.T. Oksala, a prolific producer who produced all but the band's final album.

The sound of Smack On You is perhaps truest to the band, with "Criminal" and "Run Rabbit Run" becoming classic tracks. Smack On You received rave reviews and earned the band a big following in Finland. The album was later released in the U.S. on Enigma Records, becoming the band's best seller in the U.S.

A remastered version was released in 1997 and it included five bonus tracks. Smack's first album has also been cited as a major influence for bands such as Guns n Roses, Mudhoney and Nirvana. Nirvana even covered Smack's song "Run Rabbit Run" at some live performances in 1988.

== Singles ==
1. "Criminal"
2. "Little C**t"

== Track listing ==
=== Original album ===
1. "Good Morning Headache" (Manchuria, Claude) – 2:33
2. "Run Rabbit Run" (Manchuria, Claude) – 2:22
3. "Through the Glass" (Manchuria, Claude) – 4:01
4. "Skin Alley" (Manchuria, Claude) – 2:41
5. "Little C**t" (Manchuria, Claude) – 2:30
6. "Completely Alone" (Manchuria, Claude, Cardong) – 4:23
7. "Some Fun" (Manchuria, Claude) – 1:51
8. "Ten Foot Cell" (Manchuria, Claude) – 3:46
9. "Primitive" (Manchuria, Claude) – 2:15
10. "Cemetery Walls" (Manchuria, Claude) – 3:47
11. "Criminal" (Manchuria, Claude) – 3:17
12. "No Peace on Earth" (Manchuria, Claude) – 1:23

=== 1997 bonus tracks ===
1. "Criminal" – 3:15
2. "Little C**t" – 2:04
3. "Walkin' on the Wire" (Manchuria, Claude, Smack) – 4:20
4. "Blank" (Manchuria, Rane, Claude, Smack) – 2:48
5. "I Wanna Be Your Dog" (The Stooges) – 3:51

== Personnel ==
- Claude – vocals
- Manchuria – guitar
- Kartsa – guitar
- Cheri – bass guitar
- Kinde – drums

== Charts ==
Chart performance for Smack On You
Chart (2022)	Peak position
Finnish Albums (Suomen virallinen lista)	26
