= Dingo (band) =

Finnish rock band

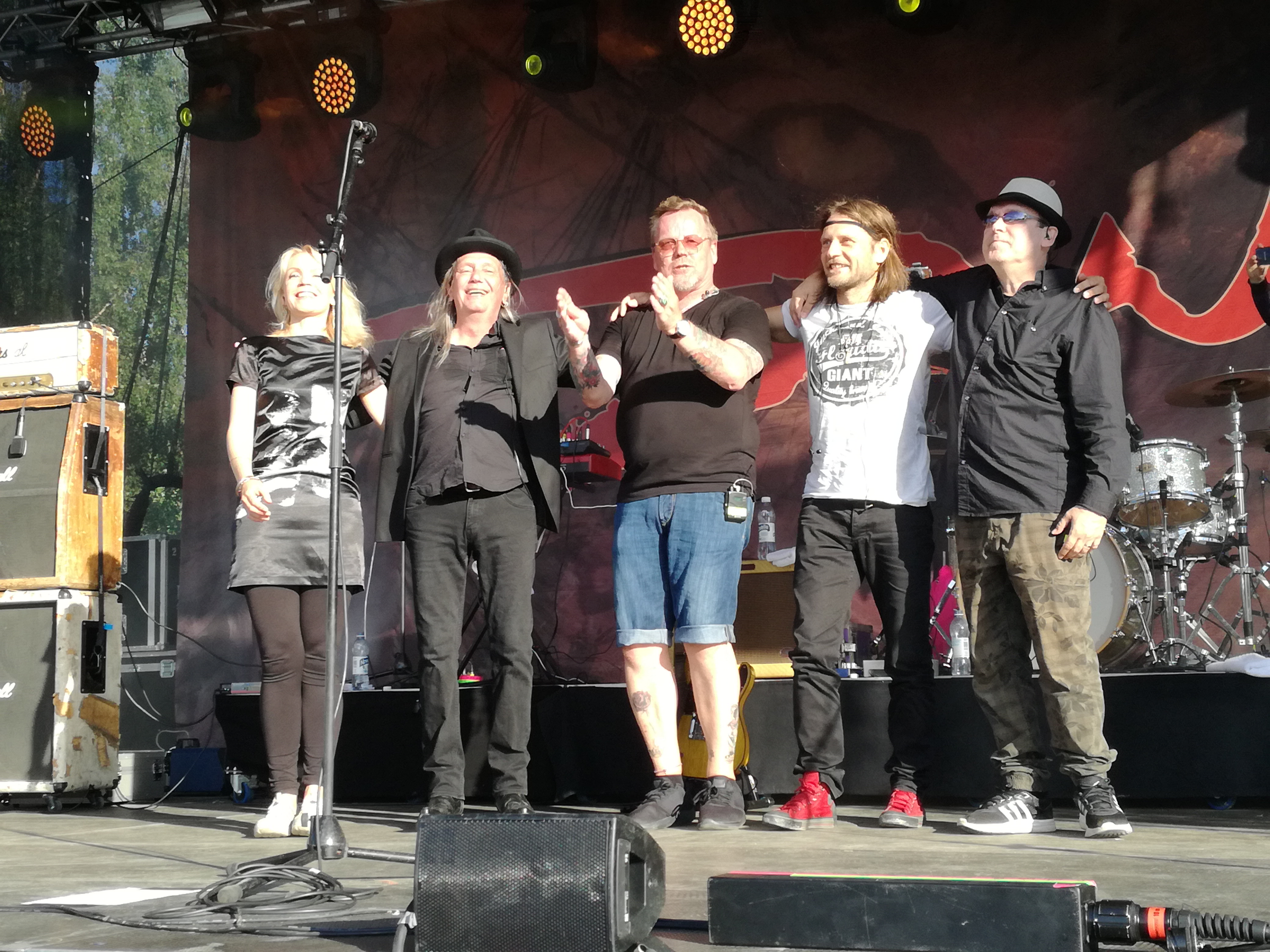
- Dingo performing in Rovaniemi in 2018

Background information
- Origin: Pori, Finland
- Genres: Rock, pop rock, new wave, glam rock
- Years active: 1982–1986, 1993–1994, 1998–2002, 2004–present
- Labels: Warner, Edel, Sonet, Bang Trax
- Members: Pertti Neumann; Jonttu Virta; Tom Eklund; Leena Peisa; Saska Ketonen
- Past members: See below
- Website: dingomania.fi

Dingo is a Finnish rock band formed around 1982, which became one of the most popular and loved Finnish bands in history.

The band's style fused Finnish melancholy with catchy rock melodies. The band was led by the frontman Pertti Neumann (also known as Pertti Nieminen). For a few years at its peak, Dingo was one of the most popular Finnish rock bands and caused a phenomenon called "Dingomania" all over Finland. The band's popularity was most prominent among teenage girls, although the band had listeners in all age groups.

Dingo's number one hit was "Autiotalo" from 1984, also released in English as "The House without a Name". A separate youth culture was formed in Finland, known as the Dingoes. Their success, however, was short-lived, and Dingo broke up in October 1986. The band regrouped in 1998 and continues to perform occasionally. The band has sold over 500,000 records in Finland.

Dingo has also released the songs "Tell Me Now" (1986), "Tobacco Road" (1986) and "House Without A Name" (1986) in English.

== History ==
=== 1980s ===
==== Beginnings ====
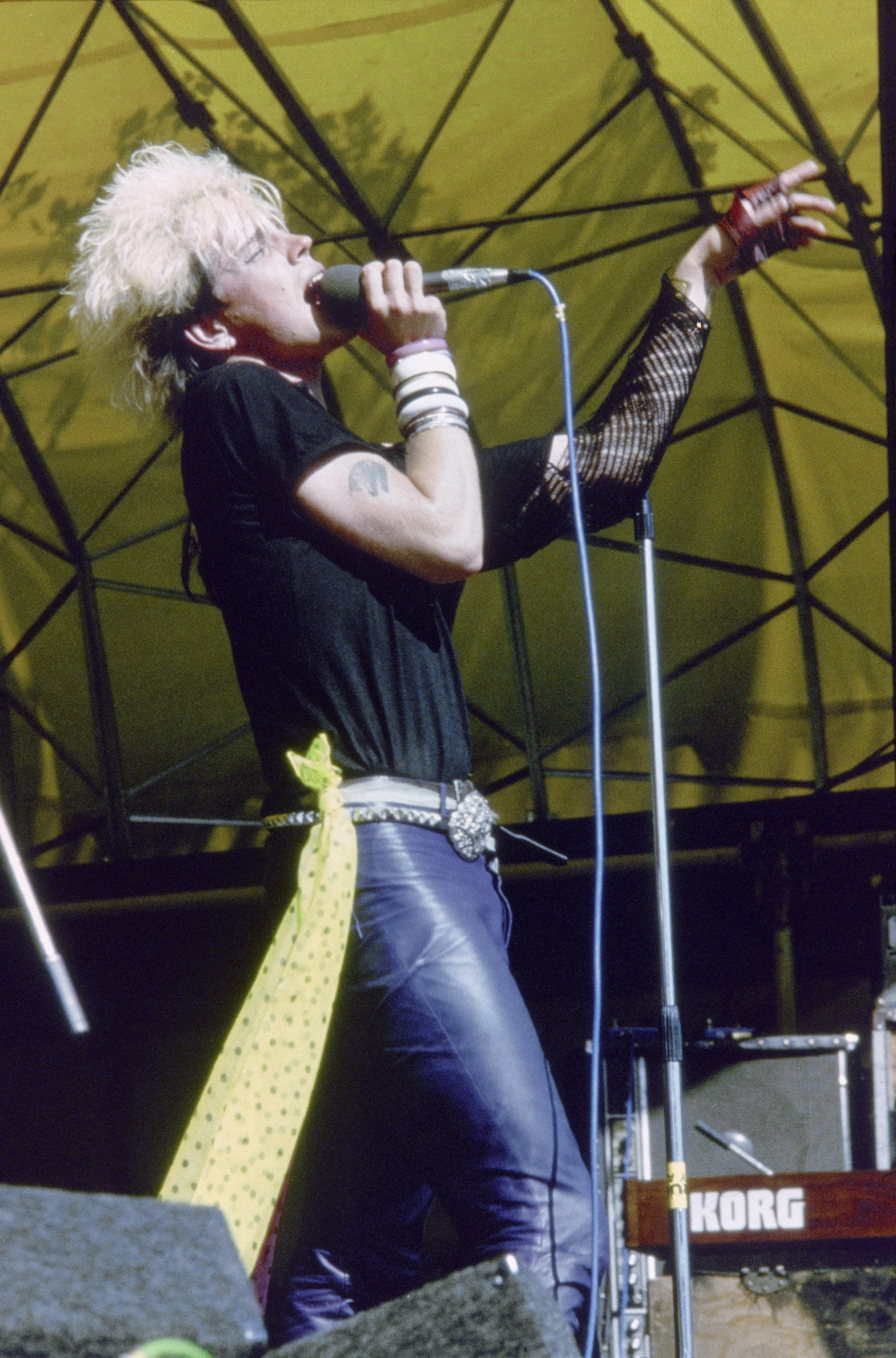
Pertti “Nipa” Neumann (1959–) when Dingo was performing in Kaivopuisto, Helsinki in 1984

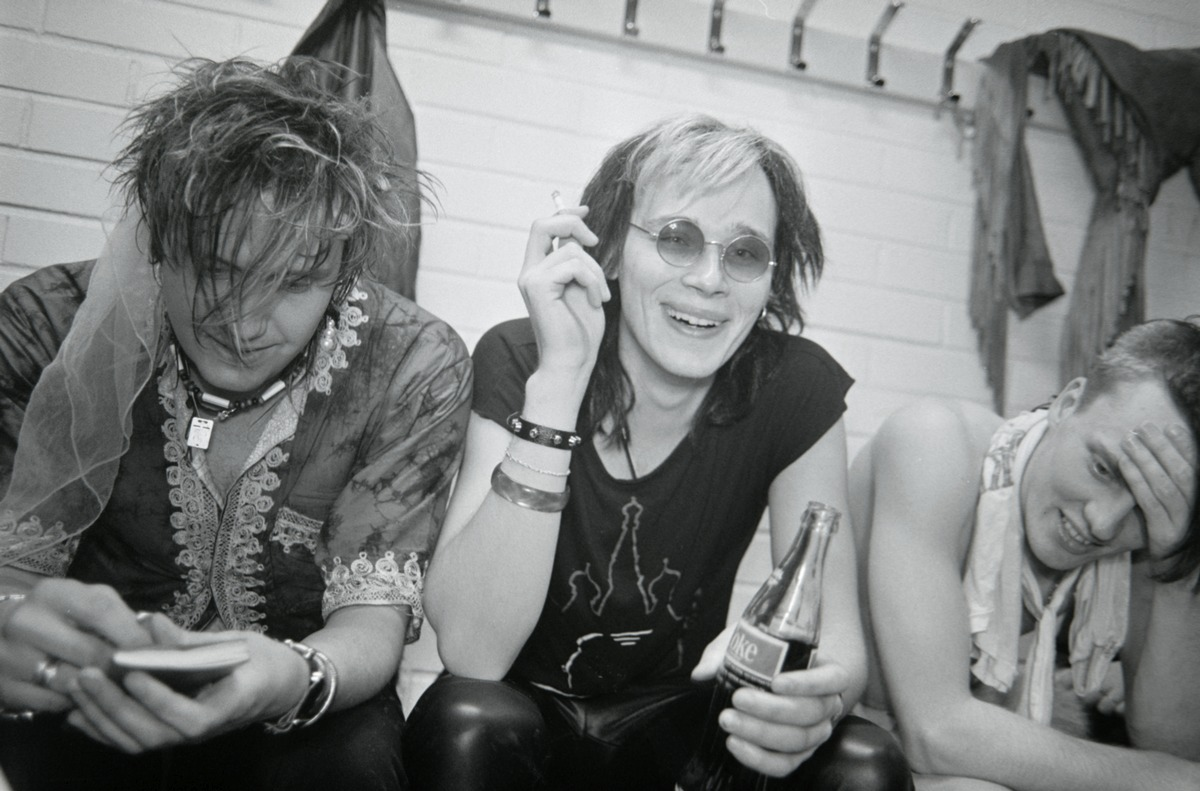
Members of Dingo in the dressing room during their concert in Kerava in 1985. From left to right: Jonttu Virta, Pete Nuotio and Quuppa Seittonen.

In early 1982 Pertti "Neumann" Nieminen started forming a new band for himself after his previous band MAC had broken up. Juha "Quuppa" Seitonen became the drummer for the new band and Jonttu Virta from the band Kieltolaki became the guitarist. At first, Neumann himself played the bass guitar instead of singing the vocals. The band was first named Sous-Pierre, which was soon shortened to Soho. However, a band in the United Kingdom was already using the name Soho, so the name of Neumann's new band was changed to Dingo.

There are several different versions for the origin of the name Dingo. Neumann has later recollected that he thought of the name while reading a foreign magazine at a kiosk. According to Jonttu Virta, the name Dingo came from one of the band's first songs, Nimeni on Dingo, which predated the band's name.

Through different phases the band reached its permanent line-up and sent a demo to a number of labels including Finnlevy, CBS, EMI and Poko Rekords. Poko Rekords rejected the demo and there has been a rumour that the demo "accidentally" ended up in the wrong drawer. Hans Rautio, CBS's chief of marketing at the time, has later recollected that the reason why CBS rejected Dingo's demo was its bad quality and the vocalist's unique style which he thought still needed improvement. On the other hand, it took only one song to convince Finnlevy, Hölmöläisten laiva. The demo also contained the band's later hit "Sinä ja minä". In June 1983 Timo Lindström from Finnlevy became interested in Dingo after the band had performed at Finnlevy's talent seeking event and the band got a record deal.

Dingo recorded their first album Nimeni on Dingo before they started playing live gigs. The album sold well right from the beginning, though the band was initially in the shadow of another popular band from Pori, Yö, whose debut album Varietee had sold over 60,000 copies and instantly become number 1 on various charts. However, Nimeni on Dingo also went on to become a number one album and eventually outsold Yö's debut album. Hits on Dingo's debut album included Sinä ja minä, Levoton Tuhkimo, Lakatut varpaankynnet and Pistoolisankari.

==== Success years ====
In January 1984 Dingo's song Sinä ja minä appeared on the Levyraati game show which it also ended up winning. The band's debut album Nimeni on Dingo was published in April 1984 and remained among the most sold albums in Finland for the whole year. Pave Maijanen was selected as the band's producer. An alternative to him would have been Jimi Sumén but Neumann ended up choosing Maijanen over him. Maijanen's role in Dingo's career has been said to have been so significant that he has even been called "the sixth Dingo".

In the 1980s Dingo became also known for Neumann's make-up and colourful outfits. Dingo's style of dressing was mainly influenced by the earlier band Hanoi Rocks. The make-up and colourful outfits the band wore also caused opposition to the band among some circles. The band had to endure shout-outs and name calling.

Dingo's success brought them a lot of fans. Dingo gained a reputation for being idolized by many teenagers. The blonde frontman Neumann was especially idolized, causing controversy in the rock circles.

After Eve left the band and replaced by Pepe at the end of 1984, the new single "Autiotalo" was released. The single climbed to the number one position on every chart and the band reached even greater fame. Dingo was no longer considered to be a band for teenage girls only, and they found fame among older people, including the teenagers' parents.

1985 was Dingo's most successful year. In February 1985 the band was doing a photoshoot for their next album Kerjäläisten valtakunta in Agadir, Morocco. In the next month the album rose to the top spot in Finnish album ranking lists.

By the time the album Kerjäläisten valtakunta was published, the number of pre-orders reached the amount of a Finnish gold record (over 50 000 copies). The album remained as a number one for three to four months and in the end sold around 190 000 copies. Every song on the album became a hit, especially the single Kirjoitan. It can be said that Dingo became an all time number one in all aspects: fame, hysteria, sales, media value and the impact on Finnish rock music at the time. They influenced several different Finnish bands and musicians such as Pyhät Nuket (the hit Enkelit sulkivat silmänsä), SIG and Pave Maijanen. Kerjäläisten valtakunta still remains the fourth-most sold Finnish album of all time.

The band's huge popularity also influenced the band's income. Dingo's average gig compensation was 30 thousand Finnish markka per gig, which was three times as high as that of other Finnish rock bands. On Midsummer in 1985 Dingo earned 130 thousand markka for one single gig, which was an unprecedented amount of money for a domestic artist in Finland at the time.

===== "Dingo fever" =====
The year 1984 was the year of the "Dingo fever". It was no longer a question of rock music alone, but a sociologically interesting phenomenon as well. Dingo was not only a rock band but also a corporation. The band members were seen on TV programs and on magazine covers.

The band members got their first touch of the "Dingo fever" in March 1984 when the band started touring in Evijärvi. 3,700 people who had bought a ticket arrived at the scene, many of whom started shouting and screaming upon seeing the band. This hysteria came as a complete surprise to the band. In the summer the band was signing autographs at the Pukeva store in Helsinki. The situation rapidly became chaotic when hysterical fans started accidentally knocking down shelves. In the end the director of the Pukeva store had to tell Dingo to leave the store before the hysterical fans would destroy it entirely.

According to Peter von Bagh and Ilpo Hakasalo the "Dingo fever" of 1984 to 1985 was a unique phenomenon in the history of Finnish popular culture. According to von Bagh and Hakasalo, the last time such phenomenal idol worship had happened was at the time of Elvis Presley in the 1950s and The Beatles in the 1960s.

The Dingo fandom was most prominent among teenage girls. Fans wanted to come as close to their idols as possible, and the pressure caused by massive groups of people caused tens of girls to faint. The hysteria surrounding to Dingo started influencing the daily lives of the band members. They could no longer even walk around on the street without a hysterical group of fans surrounding them.

"Dingo's records are being sold like Päätalo's books and girls are falling down like grandmas at Yli-Vainio's meetings." (Journalist Arvo Tuominen at the A-studio TV show in 1985.)

The hysterical fans also tried to enter the band's backstage rooms or their tour bus by force, and ran after the bus. The most enthusiastic fans set up camp around the band members' apartments in hopes of getting an autograph. There were organised trips to Pori including descriptions of the band members' homes. For example, one time when the band's drummer Quuppa was mowing his lawn, he noticed a busload of people on the street following his actions.

The band started getting frustrated with the byproducts of their huge popularity, and they set limits on the number of interviews. Because of safety reasons, photographers for newspapers and magazines were no longer allowed on stage or at the backstage rooms. Dingo also set up limits on autograph sessions, and no longer stayed to give autographs to fans after their concerts. The press took this heightened security as a sign of arrogance and started writing about Dingo in a more critical tone.

At one time, the band members were brought to their concert venues in boxes, but after a few times, the fans started noticing this. The band members were in danger of suffocating inside their boxes when the fans surrounding them were blocking their air holes. There was also opposition to Dingo. At one time, a detonator for a dynamite charge was found at the footspace of the band's tour bus, connected to the wires of the bus's front lights.

In 1985, the singer-songwriter Juha Vainio published a song called Mies joka tapasi Dingon (Finnish for: "The man who met Dingo"). The idea of the song is based on real events. Vainio had met Neumann on a TV show and advised him on his rhymes. After the show was published, young girls started asking Vainio on the street if he was indeed the man who had met Dingo. They also asked for his autograph. The song is not specifically about the time Vainio himself met Dingo, but instead about an unnamed man who meets Dingo at an automated gas station and ends up thus being involuntarily famous. The song was Vainio's humorous statement about the "Dingo fever" and the resulting loss of privacy.

Neumann's philosophical preferences, the conscious avoiding of publicity and several trips to Ireland started to alienate Dingo's younger audience. Yet Neumann's solo single "Mennään hiljaa markkinoille" and the expectations of a new Dingo single kept the band in headlines. Finally in November 1985 "Kunnian kentät" was released, once again hitting a number one position in the chart. A new Dingo album was expected to be released at Christmas 1985, but Dingo chose have a huge and expensive tour around the country.

The year 1986 was the year of international dance music. Finland also had its own popular dance music group in the form of Bogart Co. Also, the album Kahdeksas ihme by Eppu Normaali reminded that there is excellent Finnish rock music other than Dingo. After a period of silence Dingo released their new album Pyhä klaani, which did not turn out to be as successful as their earlier albums. "Koulukapina", "Kreivin sormus" and "Suru tahtoo sua" from the album were radio hits. "Pyhä klaani" also became a number 1, but the album only sold 80,000 copies, due to changes in Neumann's musical style and especially his lyrics.

Around this time, Dingo had aspirations to release singles in English. The English version of "Autiotalo" (The house without a name) and the B-side, the English version of "Kirjoitan" (Tell me now) were not successful outside Finland. The next single released in Finnish was "Juhannustanssit" ("the Midsummer Dance"), released around the Midsummer time in 1986. This single was a wild rock song that pleased rock critics more than the general audience.

==== Break-up ====
When the fans gathered in Nivala, Tuiskula in the autumn of 1986, they were shocked by the news of their favourite band falling apart. In Nivala, Pete on the keyboards was replaced by Tumppi, who only had time to perform in the band for a few weeks.

From the remains of the Dingo members, a band called S.E.X was formed. The journey of S.E.X remained rather short, releasing only a few singles: "Uuden aamun kitarat", "Canada", and arguably "Vierivä kivi" sung by Pepe. They also released and "S.E.X" in a rather posthumous spirit.

=== 1990s ===
After the break-up, the members of Dingo were active in music each on their own between 1986 and 1993. Neumann and Pepe Laaksonen formed a band called S.E.X. in 1987 but the band broke up after publishing only a couple of singles and one album. Jonttu Virta played in the band QQ Blue, Pepe Laaksonen published a solo album called Veli Kuu and Quuppa was present in many different bands. Between 1986 and 1992 Neumann published three solo albums and served as chief of production at EMI in Finland in the early 1990s.

In March 1990 Dingo performed at a surprise gig at a gala event in Pori, hosted by Neumann. Pete Nuotio did not appear at the gig, Pave Maijanen played the keyboards instead of him. Dingo did not appear again after this one gig.

In autumn 1992 Dingo was offered 100 thousand markka for one concert but the band refused. According to Neumann, the reason was affected by his own solo album Tähti ja meripoika and his autobiography by the same name.

There were rumours of Dingo getting back together in 1990 and 1991, but only after publishing the compilation album Tuhkimotarina. In 1993, the band reunited to record a new song, "Perjantai", for the compilation album Sinä ja minä. Finally, in the spring of 1994 a whole new studio album, Via Finlandia, was released on 30 April 1994, exactly ten years after the band's debut album Nimeni on Dingo. The most popular songs on the album were "Elämäni sankari" and "Nähdään taas". Dingo also went on tour with Pave Maijanen on the keyboards. The band soon split up again, despite Via Finlandia having sold 13 thousand copies.

In 1996 a TV documentary called Nuoret sankarit: Dingon tarina was shown on YLE TV1 as the fourth part of the documentary series Kunnian kentät: Suomalaisen rockin 1980-luku documentary series. The documentary was written and directed by Axa Sorjanen. The documentary included interviews of all five classic members of the band as well as Lasse Norres, Pave Maijanen and the band's original bass player Eve. The interviews have later been published unedited at the YLE Elävä arkisto service.

Dingo appeared with their classic line-up on the show Yllätys, yllätys at MTV3 performing an acoustic version of their song Hämähäkkimies. After this surprise performance the band did not continue performing.

=== 2000s ===
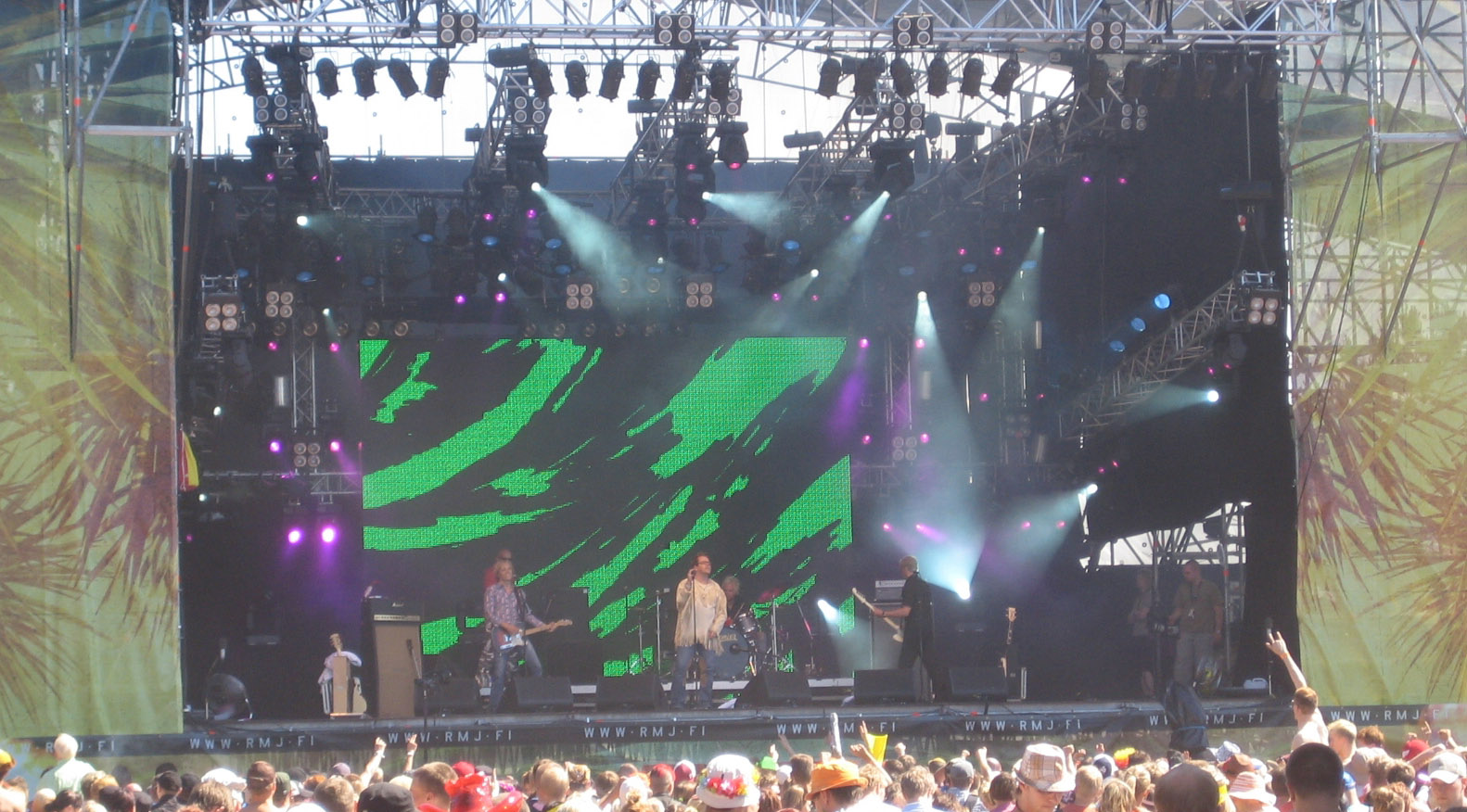
Dingo performing at the Raumanmeren juhannus festival in 2006.

The keyboard player Pete Nuotio and the drummer Quuppa Seittonen left the band in January 2002 because of the band's failure to come up with new music. The other members were also frustrated with the band's inability to keep up with the times. After Nuotio and Seittonen had left, the band went on hiatus again. However, Neumann said the band would continue despite changes in its line-up.

On 31 December 2002 Dingo performed at the Saku Suurhall in Tallinn, Estonia with a special line-up. The line-up included Neumann and Jarkko Eve, as well as Jari "Heinä" Nieminen at the guitar, Pekka Kuorikoski at the keyboards and Vesa Aaltonen at the drums. The same line-up performed again at the Holiday Club Katinkulta in Vuokatti in February 2003 with the name Neumann Band Plays Dingo. Dingo's former members did not want to appear at the line-up. Despite this, the concert was advertised as an event by the original Dingo band, even including a photograph of the original line-up, which angered the original members:

A concert in Tallinn is being advertised with the name and picture of Dingo, with Neumann appearing without the rest of the band members.

The New Year's Eve show on the website of the Saku Suurhall is being advertised as "The special guest of the evening is the legendary Finnish band Dingo, which has agreed to come together once again for this evening".

The former members of the band were puzzled by this.

"This is outrageous. They are making business and earning money with principles that affect us former Dingo members. Surely this can't be legal, at least it's not honest", the keyboard player Pete Nuotio told Ilta-Sanomat.

Neumann defended himself by saying he owned the Dingo trademark and he could recreate the band if he wanted to. He also said that he could not have refused the offer, or else Saku Suurhall would have signed Aerosmith to appear on New Year's Eve 2002. Neumann said he had asked Virta and Laaksonen to come to the concert, but they had refused. Neumann has later said he thinks of Dingo as a good and strong brand which is worth using.

Dingo's new collection album Dingomania along with a DVD of the same name was published in spring 2004. At the same time the band announced they would start doing gigs again. Dingo started their 20th anniversary tour at the Raumanmeren juhannus festival in 2004 with a line-up consisting of vocalist Neumann, bass player Jarkko Eve, guitar player Hombre Lampinen, keyboard player Sami Välimäki and drummer Juha Jokinen. The first appearance of the band on their return tour was photographed and shown in autumn 2004 on the TV channel Yle TV2. In May 2004 the band changed their entire line-up except for Neumann and Eve. The line-up now included musicians from the band Bomfunk MC's, the drummer Ari Toikka, the guitar player Erik Valkama and the keyboard player Pekka Siistonen. On 8 June 2005 Dingo published their new single Musta leski which was the first song from their upcoming album. The studio album Purppuraa was published on 26 October, produced by Antti Suomalainen and Risto Asikainen. The album Purppuraa did not do very well. The highest spot it reached on the Official Finnish Charts was at place 9.

Dingo's line-up changed again in 2007. The band's new drummer was Jukka "Frogley" Mänty-Sorvari, and their new keyboard player later in the same spring was Robert Engstrand. Mänty-Sorvari left the band later in the same year and was replaced with Ville Siuruainen.

== Discography ==
Line-ups
Original line-up (1982–1983)	Pertti Neumann – vocals/bass guitar; Jonttu Virta – lead guitar; Juha Seittonen – drums
(1983)	Pertti Neumann – vocals; Jonttu Virta – lead guitar; Jarkko Eve – bass guitar/vocals; Tuomo Vähä-Pesola – keyboards; Juha Seittonen – drums
Line-up on debut album (11/1983–7/1984)	Pertti Neumann – vocals; Jonttu Virta – lead guitar; Jarkko Eve – bass guitar/vocals; Pete Nuotio – keyboards; Juha Seittonen – drums
Most famous line-up ("the famous five") (7/1984–7/1986)	Pertti Neumann – vocals; Jonttu Virta – lead guitar; Pepe Laaksonen – bass guitar/vocals; Pete Nuotio – keyboards; Juha Seittonen – drums
(7/1986–10/1986)	Pertti Neumann – vocals; Jonttu Virta – lead guitar; Pepe Laaksonen – bass guitar/vocals; Tuomo Vähä-Pesola – keyboards; Juha Seittonen – drums
(10/1986–6/1993)	Band was broken.
(6/1993–8/1994)	Pertti Neumann – vocals; Jonttu Virta – lead guitar; Pepe Laaksonen – bass guitar/vocals; Pave Maijanen – keyboards; Juha Seittonen – drums
(8/1994–10/1998)	Band was broken.
Most famous line-up (reunion) (10/1998–1/2002)	Pertti Neumann – vocals; Jonttu Virta – lead guitar; Pepe Laaksonen – bass guitar/vocals; Pete Nuotio – keyboards; Juha Seittonen – drums
(1/2002–12/2002)	Band was broken.
(31 December 2002)	Pertti Neumann – vocals; Jari Nieminen – lead guitar; Jarkko Eve – bass guitar/vocals; Pekka Kuorikoski – keyboards; Vesa Aaltonen – drums
(1/2003–6/2004)	Band was broken.
(6/2004–5/2005)	Pertti Neumann – vocals; Hombre Lampinen – lead guitar; Jarkko Eve – bass guitar/vocals; Sami Välimäki – keyboards; Juha Jokinen – drums
(5/2005–3/2007)	Pertti Neumann – vocals; Erik Valkama – lead guitar; Jarkko Eve – bass guitar/vocals; Pekka Siistonen – keyboards; Ari Toikka – drums
(3/2007–6/2007)	Pertti Neumann – vocals; Erik Valkama – lead guitar; Jarkko Eve – bass guitar/vocals; Pekka Siistonen – keyboards; Jukka Mänty-Sorvari – drums
(6/2007–12/2007)	Pertti Neumann – vocals; Erik Valkama – lead guitar; Jarkko Eve – bass guitar/vocals; Robert Engstrand – keyboards; Jukka Mänty-Sorvari – drums
(1/2008–7/2008)	Pertti Neumann – vocals; Erik Valkama – guitar; Jarkko Eve – bass guitar/vocals; Robert Engstrand – keyboards; Ville Siuruainen – drums
(8/2008–11/2011)	Pertti Neumann – vocals; Erik Valkama – lead guitar; Vesa Kuhlman – bass guitar; Robert Engstrand – keyboards; Ville Siuruainen – drums
(11/2011–9/2014)	Pertti Neumann – vocals; Erik Valkama – lead guitar; Vesa Kuhlman – bass guitar; Jani Hölli – keyboards; Ville Siuruainen – drums
(9/2014–12/2014)	Hiatus
(12/2014–10/2015)	Pertti Neumann – vocals; Janne Kasurinen / Mikko Virta – electric guitar; Esa Nummela – acoustic guitar, backing vocals; Topi Karvonen – bass guitar; Jere Ijäs – keyboards, backing vocals; Tero Rikkonen – drums, backing vocals
(10/2015–2016)	Pertti Neumann – vocals; Rein T. Rebane – lead guitar; Taago Daniel – bass guitar; Petri Lapintie – keyboards; Vallo Vildak – drums
One concert (10/2016)	Pertti Neumann – vocals; Tom Eklund – lead guitar; Matti Kankkonen – guitar; Simo Kuusela – bass guitar; Petteri Parkkila – keyboards; Otto Haapanen – drums
Most famous line-up (reunion) (2/2017–12/2017)	Pertti Neumann – vocals; Jonttu Virta – lead guitar; Pepe Laaksonen – bass guitar/vocals; Pete Nuotio – keyboards; Juha Seittonen – drums
(2/2018–4/2024)	Pertti Neumann – vocals; Jonttu Virta – lead guitar; Pepe Laaksonen – bass guitar/vocals; Leena Peisa – keyboards; Saska Ketonen – drums
Current (4/2024–)	Pertti Neumann – vocals; Jonttu Virta – lead guitar; Tom Eklund – bass guitar/vocals; Leena Peisa – keyboards; Saska Ketonen – drums

=== Studio albums ===
- Nimeni on Dingo (1984)
- Kerjäläisten valtakunta (1985)
- Pyhä klaani (1986)
- Via Finlandia (1994)
- Purppuraa (2005)
- Humisevan harjun paluu (2008)

=== Videos/DVDs ===
- Nimemme on Dingo (1984, VHS)
- Kerjäläisten valtakunnassa (1985, VHS)
- Dingo Live (1999, VHS)
- Dingomania (2004, DVD)

=== Tributes ===
- Melkein vieraissa – Nimemme on Dingo (2008)

=== Compilation albums ===
- Tuhkimotarina (1993)
- Sinä & Minä (1993)
- 20 suosikkia – Autiotalo (1997)
- Parhaat (1999) (2CD)
- Dingomania (2004) (2CD)
- Tähtisarja – 30 suosikkia (2006) (2CD)
- Kunnian päivät 1983–1986 (2006) (3CD+DVD box)
- Sound Pack 2CD+DVD (2010) (2CD+DVD)
- Autiotalon aarteet (2017)

== Band members ==
=== Current ===
- Pertti Neumann – 1982-1986, 1993–1994, 1998–2002 and 2004–
- Jonttu Virta – guitar 1982–1986, 1993–1994, 1998–2002 and 2017–
- Tom Eklund – bass guitar 2024–
- Leena Peisa – keyboardist 2018-
- Saska Ketonen – drums 2018-

=== Former ===
- Jonttu Virta – lead guitar 1982–2002
- Juha "Quuppa" Seittonen – drums 1982–1986, 1993–1994, 1998–2002 and 2017
- Jarkko Eve – bass guitar 1983–1984 and 2002–2008
- Tuomo Vähä-Pesola – keyboards 1983, 1986
- Pete Nuotio – keyboards 1983–1986 and 1998–2002
- Pepe Laaksonen – bass guitar 1984–1986, 1993–1994, 1998–2002 and 2017–2024
- Pepe Laaksonen – bass guitar 1984–2002
- Pave Maijanen – keyboards 1993–1994
- Jari Nieminen – lead guitar 2002
- Vesa Aaltonen – drums 2002
- Pekka Kuorikoski – keyboards 2002
- Hombre Lampinen – lead guitar 2004–2005
- Juha Jokinen – drums 2004–2005
- Sami Välimäki – keyboards 2004–2005
- Erik Valkama – lead guitar 2005–2014
- Ari Toikka – drums 2005–2007
- Pekka Siistonen – keyboards 2005–2007
- Jukka Mänty-Sorvari – drums 2007
- Robert Engstrand – keyboards 2007–2011
- Vesa Kuhlman – bass guitar 2008–2014
- Ville Siuruainen – drums 2008–2014
- Jani Hölli – keyboards 2011–2014
- Janne Kasurinen / Mikko Virta – electric guitar 2014–2015
- Esa Nummela – acoustic guitar, backing vocals 2014–2015
- Topi Karvonen – bass guitar 2014–2015
- Jere Ijäs – keyboards, backing vocals 2014–2015
- Tero Rikkonen – drums, backing vocals 2014–2015
- Rein T. Rebane – lead guitar 2015–2016
- Taago Daniel – bass guitar 2015–2016
- Petri Lapintie – keyboards 2015–2016
- Vallo Vildak – drums 2015–2016

== See also ==
- List of best-selling music artists in Finland
