= In Your Face 1982–1990 =

In Your Face 1982−1990

Compilation album by Smack
- Released: 2007
- Recorded: 1982–1990
- Genre: Garage rock, glam rock
- Label: Sony BMG

In Your Face 1982−1990 is the Finnish rock band Smack's double compilation album. It was released in 2007. The compilation includes two CDs, the first a combination of all four Smack studio albums, and the second including previously unreleased live recordings from the 80's.

== Track list ==
=== CD 1 (studio) ===
1. "Criminal"
2. "Good Morning Headache"
3. "Run Rabbit Run"
4. "Completely Alone"
5. "Ten Foot Cell"
6. "Through The Glass"
7. "Blank"
8. "Nearby The Hanging Tree"
9. "Rattlesnake Bite"
10. "Somewhere Out Of The Day"
11. "Pass that Bottle"
12. "Oh Lord"
13. "(I Think I'm Gonna) Buy This Town"
14. "The Only Salvation"
15. "Hellhounds On My Tail"
16. "Moonshine Chile"
17. "Look Around"
18. "Set My love On You"
19. "Little Sister"
20. "Mad About You"
21. "Mad Animal Shuffle"
22. "Russian Fields"
23. "Can You Dig It"

=== CD 2 (live) ===
1. "Run Rabbit Run"
2. "Skin Alley"
3. "Criminal"
4. "Good Morning Headache"
5. "Some Fun"
6. "Walkin' On The Fire"
7. "Wishing Well"
8. "Pills"
9. "Completely Alone"
10. "Steppin’ Stone"
11. "Icedrops"
12. "Maggie McGill"
13. "Wilderness"
14. "Set My Love On You"
15. "Hellhounds On My Tail"
16. "Johnny The Pusher"
17. "Set Me Free"
18. "Little Sister"
19. "Mad About You"
20. "Little Cunt"
21. "Pass That Bottle / Route 66"
22. "Jumpin’ Jack Flash"
23. "Skin Alley"
24. "Can You Dig It"

== Line-up ==
- Claude (Ilari Peltola) – vocals (1982–1990)
- Manchuria (Mika Mantere) – guitar (1982–1990)
- Cheri (Simo Martin) – bass (1982–1986)
- Kartsa (Kari Marjanen) – guitar (1982–1984)
- Juki Marjala – rummut (1983–1984)
- Kinde (Kimmo Leskinen) – rummut (1984–1989)
- Rane Raitsikka (Harri Jäntti) – guitar (1984–1990)
- Jimi Sero – bass (1986–1989)
- Repa Rantsila – rummut (1989–1990)
- Ulan Bator a.k.a. Sam Yaffa (Sami Takamäki) – bass (1989–1990)
