= Lasse Norres =

Finnish music producer (1952–2025)

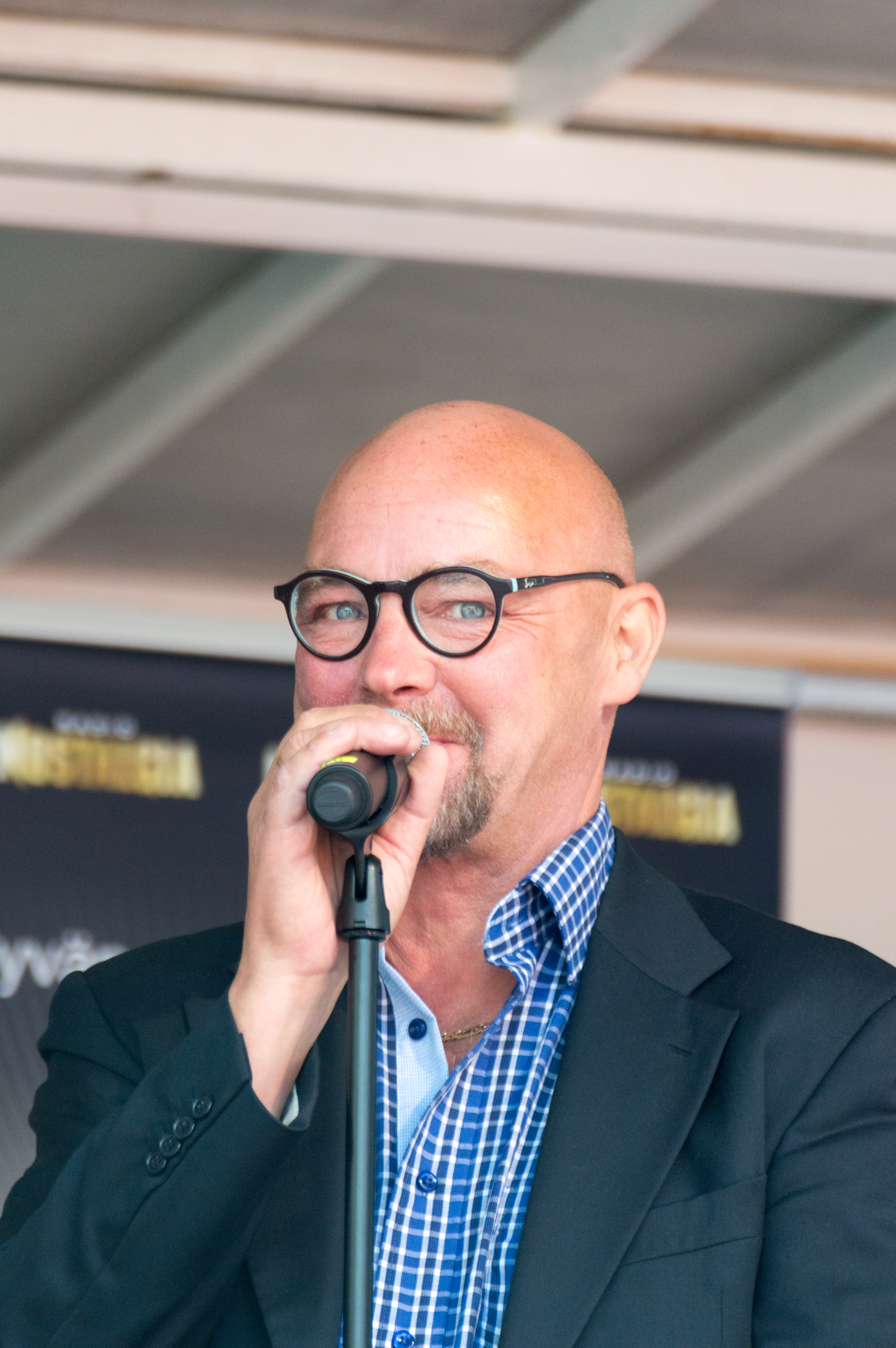
Lasse Norres

Lars Johan Christian "Lasse" Norres (21 September 1952 – 14 November 2025) was a Finnish music and entertainment industry producer. In the 1980s, he served as the manager of the popular band Dingo and as the informer of the record label Finnlevy. He also worked in his own company called Entertainment Capital Finland Oy (also known as Riopop Oy Ltd. / ECF Oy).

Norres was a member of the board of the organization Lastenklinikoiden Kummit ry, which helps support children's hospitals, from 1999 to 2004. In 2006, he was awarded the "Journalist of the year" award by the Finnish Hot Rod Association FHRA, which was awarded for his significant work in advancing journalism. In 2008, he was awarded the Musiikki & Media award for his 40 years of work in the music industry.

Norres was elected to the city council of Vantaa in 2008 and 2012 as a candidate from the National Coalition Party and he was a candidate for the Parliament of Finland from the same party in the 2011 Finnish parliamentary election.

== Career ==
In the early 1970s, Lasse Norres wrote articles about pop music in the magazine Stump. He worked at Musiikki-Fazer since 1976, and acted as the manager of Kari Tapio, Katri Helena and Paula Koivuniemi.

Norres acted as the manager of the popular band Dingo in the 1980s. Norres started cooperating with Dingo in 1984 when he was acting as the informer of the record company Finnlevy. Norres quit his job at Finnlevy in 1985 to become the full-time manager of the band Dingo. Together with Dingo, Norres founded the record company Bang Trax and served as its CEO.

Disagreements between Norres and Dingo started appearing, for example including the use of money. The band founded a company of their own without Norres's knowledge. In the end, internal disagreements within the band and their growing financial problems led to the band breaking up in October 1986.

Norres also acted as Dingo's manager when the band made a come-back from 1993 to 1994. Norres also acted as Dingo's manager in the early 2000s.

Norres later said he was disappointed that he is only remembered as the manager of Dingo, even though he has also acted in cooperation of numerous other artists.

The cooperation of Dingo and Lasse Norres was also the subject of the 2024 film My Name Is Dingo. In the film, Norres is played by Elias Salonen. Norres himself thought the character was a failure. According to Norres, the film presents him as more greedy than he really was.

In the 1990s, Norres returned to work at Fazer Finnlevy and also worked at the company Warner Music Finland which was founded to replace it. He also led the event companies Riopop Finland and Entertainment Capital Finland that he had founded.

In November 2025 Norres was posthumously awarded the Prominent Cultural Act prize by the city of Vantaa. it was given to him for "prominent actions to liven up the artistic field of the city of Vantaa". Norres was informed of the award already before his death.

== Background ==
Norres had a daughter, Christa, born in the early 1990s from a short relationship with a Kenyan woman. Norres was married to Tahiti Liljegren in 1994, but the marriage ended in a divorce only two years later. In 2002 Norres married Sari Poutiainen and they had two children, born in 2000 and 2004. Beginning in 2006, the family lived in Nikinmäki in Vantaa.

Norres died on 14 November 2025, at the age of 73.
