= Tiit Niilo =

Estonian politician

Tiit Niilo (born 30 May 1962) is an Estonian politician. He was a member of X Riigikogu.

== Early life ==
Niilo was born in Võru and graduated from the Estonian University of Life Sciences in 1986 with a degree in electrical engineering.

== Career ==
Niilo ran in the spring 2003 Riigikogu elections in Võru, Valga and Põlva counties on the Res Publica Party ticket, collecting 787 votes. Niilo became a member of the Riigikogu in connection with the resignation of Hannes Võrno.
