= Sakari =

Sakari is a given name, and may refer to:

- Sakari Kukko (born 1953), Finnish saxophonist and flutist
- Sakari Kuosmanen (born 1956), Finnish singer and actor
- Sakari Mattila (born 1989), Finnish football player
- Sakari Oramo (born 1965), Finnish conductor
- Sakari Pinomäki, Finnish mechanical and hydraulic systems engineer
- Sakari Timonen (born 1957), Finnish blogger
- Sakari Tuomioja (1911-1964), Finnish politician
- Yrjö Sakari Yrjö-Koskinen (1830-1903), freiherr, senator, professor, historian, and politician

== See also ==
- Sakari (village), India
- Sakari Station
- Sakari were chosen guard of the Pharaoh
