= Eemeli Heikkinen =

Finnish ice hockey player

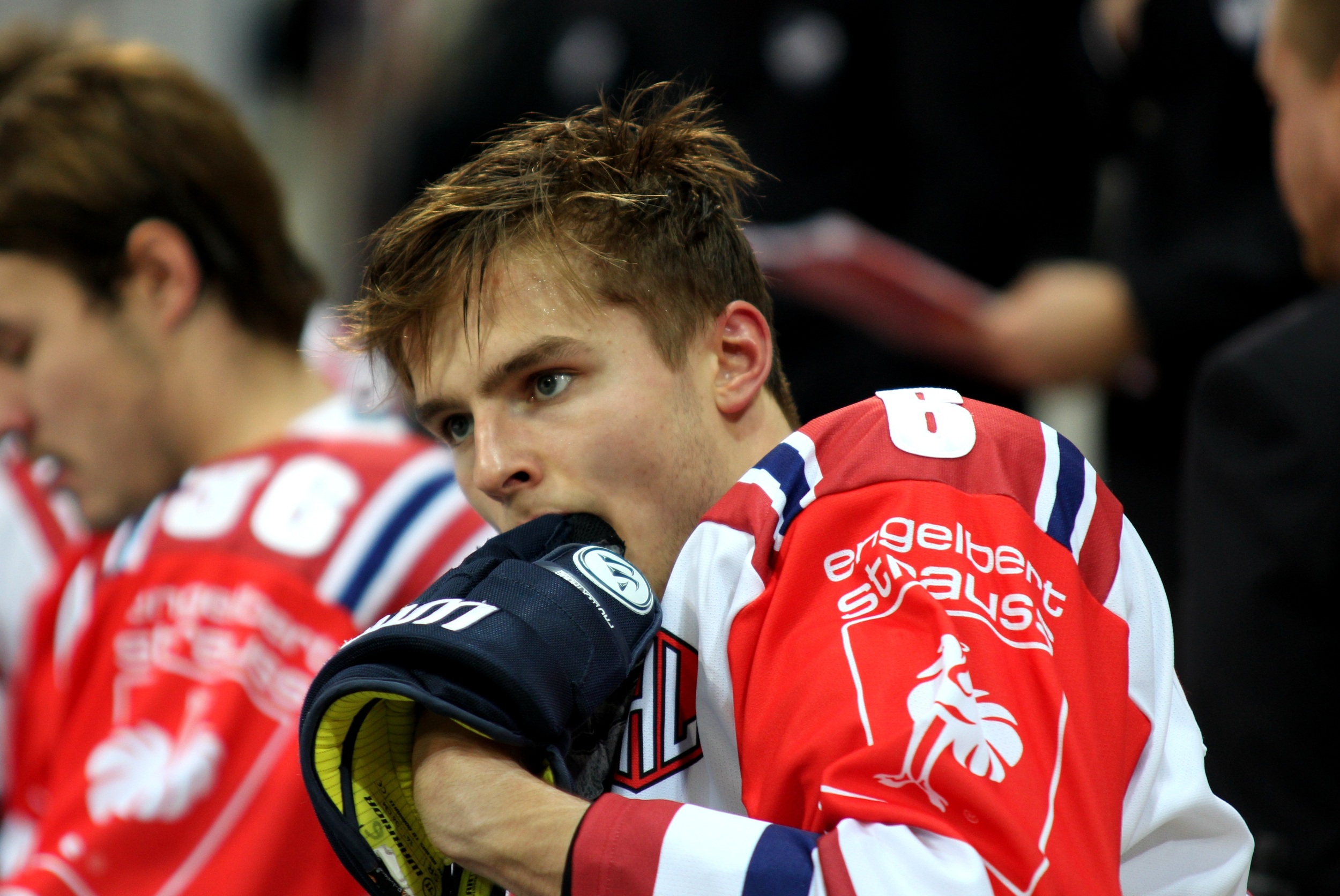
- Eemeli Heikkinen Image
- Born: August 29, 1994 (age 30); Helsinki, Finland
- Height: 6 ft 4 in (193 cm)
- Weight: 207 lb (94 kg; 14 st 11 lb)
- Position: Defense
- Shoots: Right
- Liiga team Former teams: HIFK; Kiekko-Vantaa
- NHL draft: Undrafted
- Playing career: 2013–present

Eemeli Heikkinen (born August 29, 1994) is a Finnish professional ice hockey player. He is currently playing for HIFK of the Finnish Liiga.

Heikkinen made his Liiga debut playing with HIFK during the 2014-15 Liiga season.
