= SIG (band) =

Finnish band

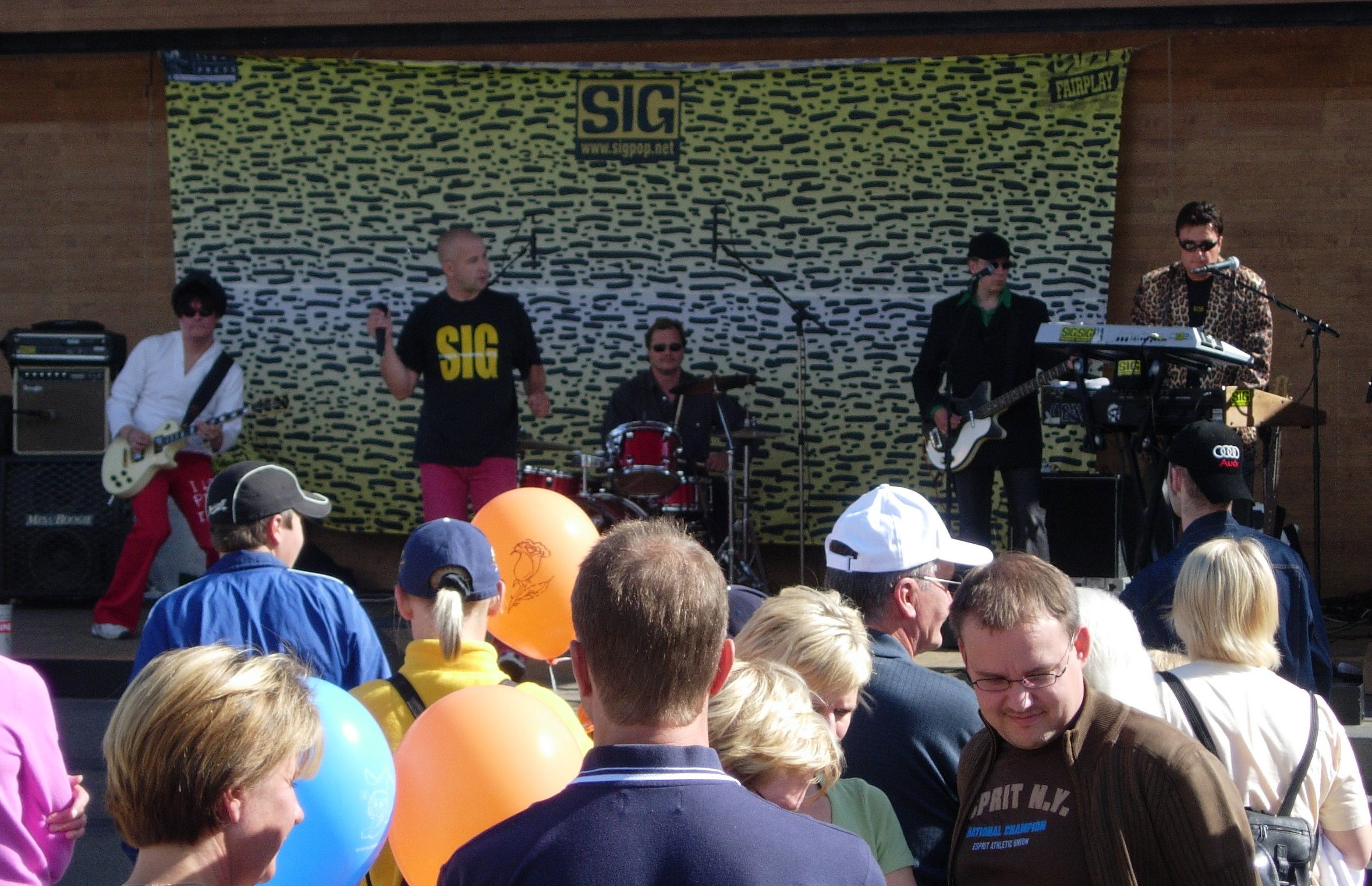
- SIG on a concert in Raisio

Background information
- Origin: Raisio, Finland
- Genres: pop music
- Years active: 1978–1987; 1995–2000; 2003–2009
- Labels: Norsu
- Members: Erkka Makkonen; Jouni Salovaara; Jukka Merisaari; Juha Oksanen
- Past members: Matti Inkinen; Timo Kilpinen; Moko Karttunen; Matti Ranta; Rauno Linja-aho; Ari Hemmilä; Karhu Hiltunen; Seppo Wahl; Eero Valkonen; Jukka Vehkala; Teppo Seppänen; Ari Hemmilä
- Website: sigpop.net

SIG was a pop band from Raisio, Finland, formed in 1978. The lead singer of the band was Matti Inkinen. The breakthrough song SIG was "Tiina menee naimisiin" (Tiina is getting married). The most famous songs from SIG are “Vuosisadan rakkaustarina“ (English: The lovestory of the century) and “Hyvää syntymäpäivää“ (English: Happy birthday). Original SIG broke down in 1987. The comeback album of SIG was "Suomalainen pop-levy" (A Finnish Pop Album). The lead singer of SIG Matti Inkinen died in 2009.

== Discography ==
- Matkalla maineeseen (1980) (In a Way to Fame)
- Sudet (1981) (Wolves)
- Vuosisadan rakkaustarina (1982) (The Lovestory of the Century)
- Syke (1984) (Beat)
- Unelmia (1985) (Dreams)
- Purppura (1986) (Purple)
- Rakkauden sävel (1995) (Melody of Love)
- Kansanlauluja kaupungeista (1998) (Folk Songs from Cities)
- Suomalainen pop-levy (2003) (Finnish pop Album)

== Members ==
=== 1978–1979 ===
- Matti Inkinen (vocals)
- Timo Kilpinen (guitar)
- Moko Karttunen (bass)
- Matti Ranta (drums)
- Juha Oksanen (keyboard)

=== 1979–1981 ===
- Matti Inkinen (vocals)
- Timo Kilpinen (guitar, bass)
- Rauno Linja-aho (guitar)
- Ari Hemmilä (bass)
- Matti Ranta (drums)
- Juha Oksanen (keyboard)

=== 1981–1987 ===
- Matti Inkinen (vocals)
- Rauno Linja-aho (guitar)
- Ari Hemmilä (bass)
- Jukka Merisaari (drums)
- Juha Oksanen (keyboard)

=== 1995–1996 ===
- Matti Inkinen (vocals)
- Erkka Makkonen (guitar)
- Karhu Hiltunen (bass)
- Eero Valkonen (drums)
- Seppo Wahl (keyboard)

=== 1997–1999 ===
- Matti Inkinen (vocals)
- Jukka Vehkala (guitar)
- Karhu Hiltunen (bass)
- Teppo Seppänen (guitar, drums)

=== 2000 ===
- Matti Inkinen (vocals)
- Erkka Makkonen (guitar)
- Ari Hemmilä (bass)
- Jukka Merisaari (drums)
- Juha Oksanen (keyboard)

=== 2003–2009 ===
- Matti Inkinen (vocals)
- Erkka Makkonen (guitar)
- Jouni Salovaara (bass)
- Jukka Merisaari (drums)
- Juha Oksanen (keyboard)

=== 2009– ===
- Erkka Makkonen (guitar)
- Jouni Salovaara (bass)
- Jukka Merisaari (drums)
- Juha Oksanen (keyboard)
