= Husula =

City district in Hamina, Finland

Coordinates: 60°37′N 27°11′E

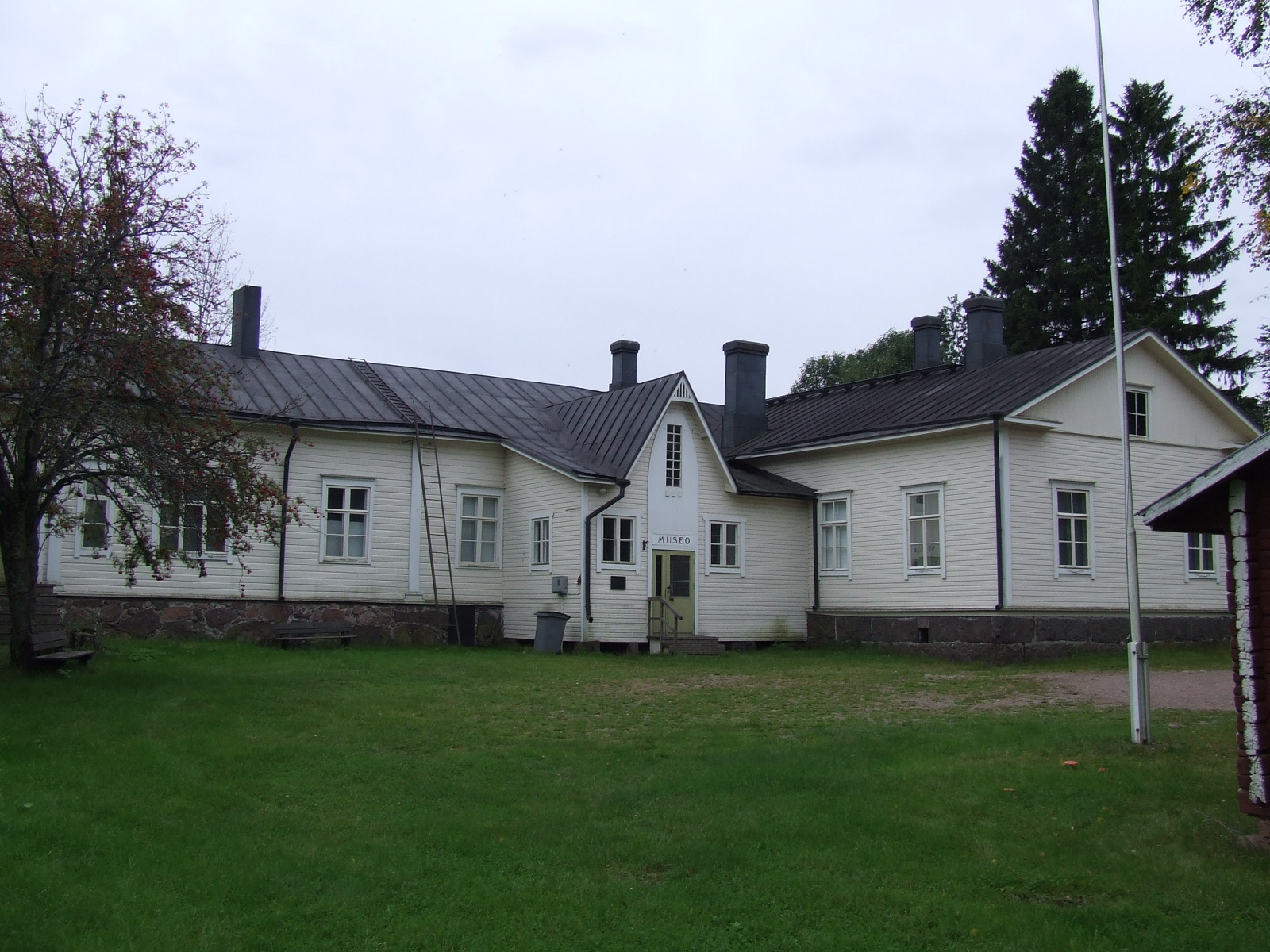
Vehkalahti local history museum in Husula

Husula is a village and district in Hamina, Finland. It is located approximately 3 kilometres north from the town centre. Before the town of Hamina and municipality of Vehkalahti consolidated at the beginning of 2003, Husula was part of Vehkalahti. Together with the neighboring Salmenkylä, it comprises one of the biggest population centers in Hamina, with a population of nearly 2,000.

Husula has played a part in Finnish history. In the 18th century when Sweden and Russia were at war, Swedish King Gustav III and his army rested in Husula before they tried to attack Russian-occupied Hamina.

Husula has two old cemeteries which are separated by the National road 7. Formerly the northern cemetery belonged to the Vehkalahti congregation and the southern one to the Hamina congregation, but now they both belong to the unified Hamina congregation.

== Services ==
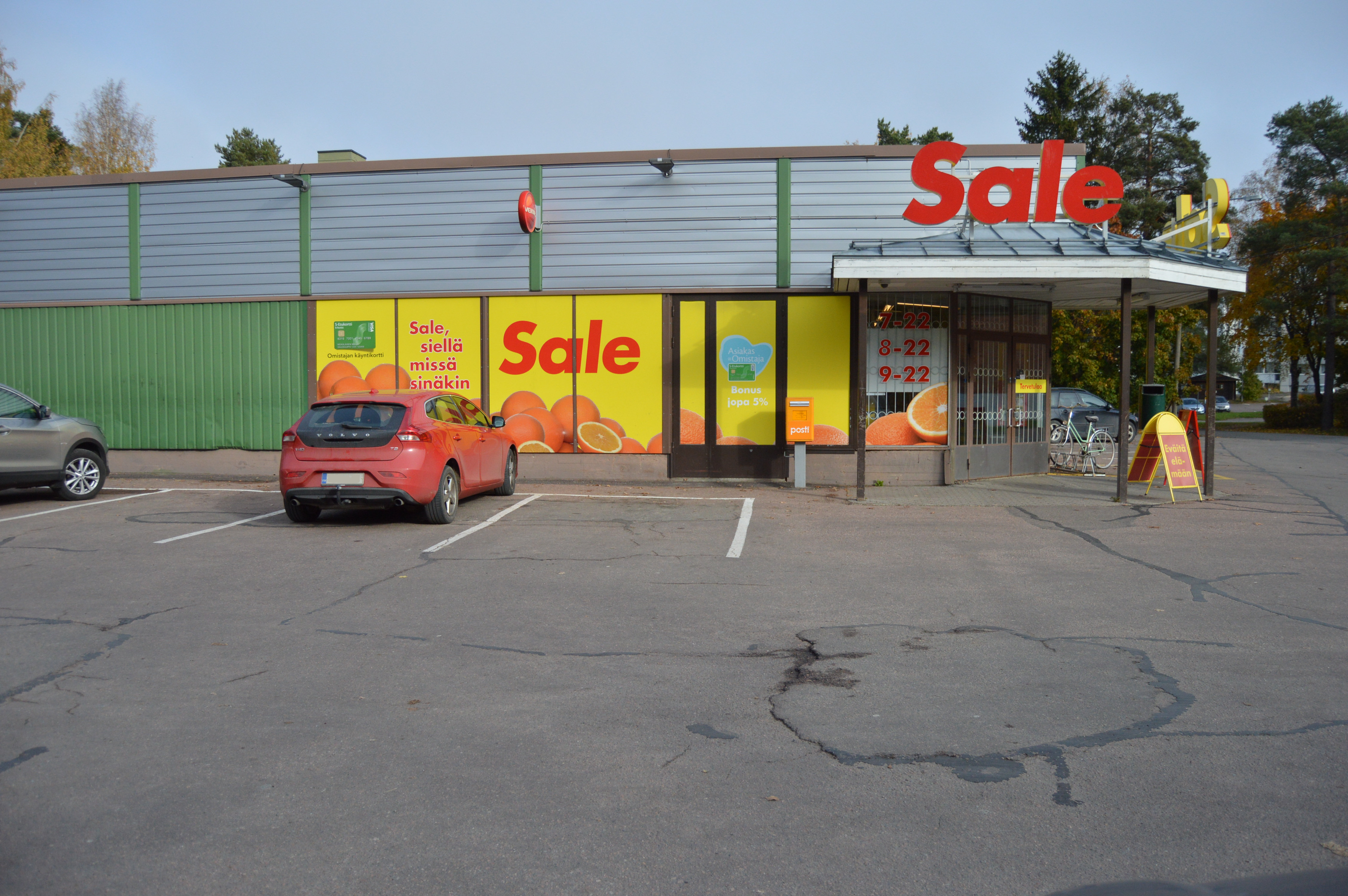
Sale grocery store in Husula.

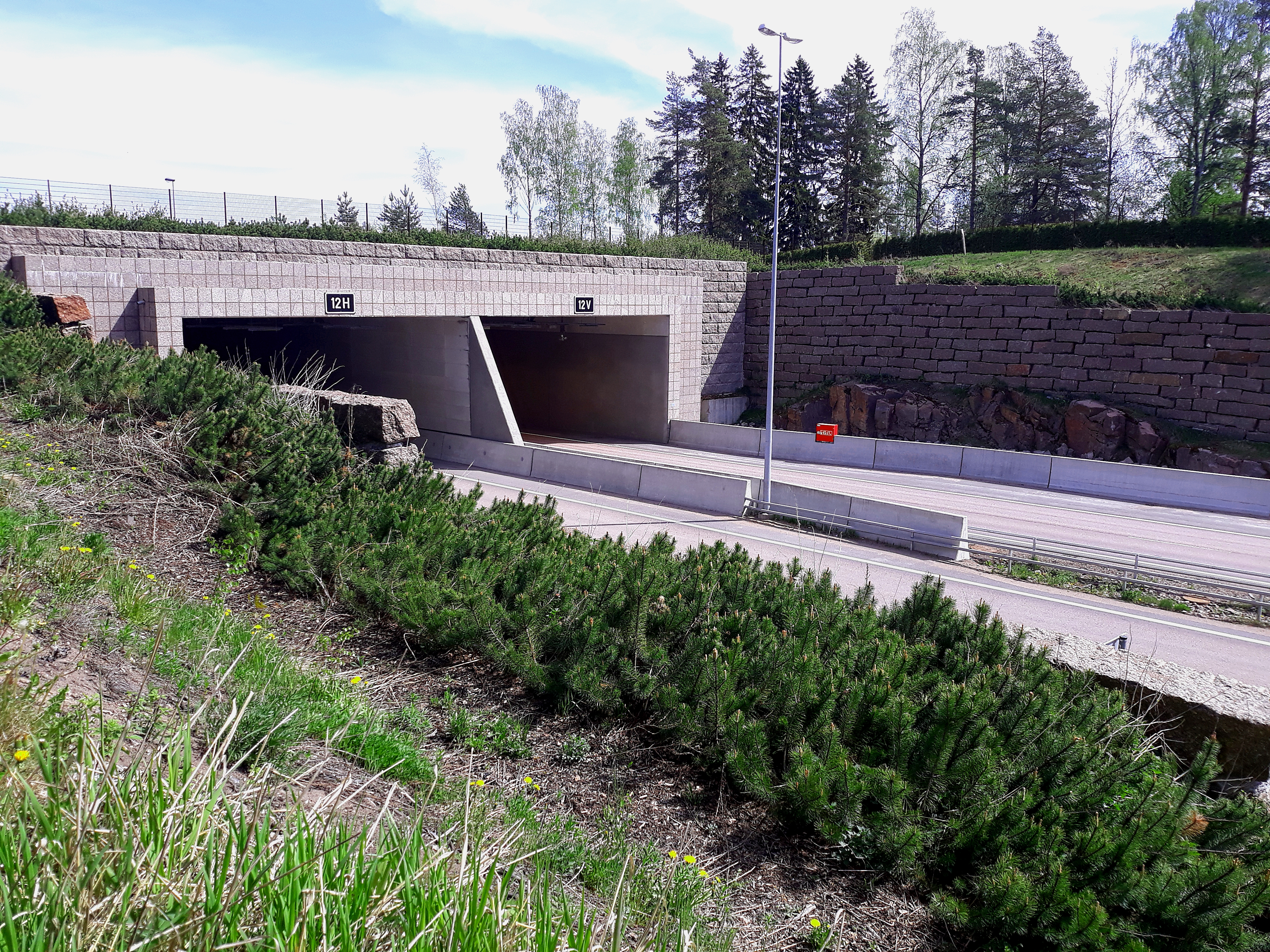
Husula highway tunnel

- Marian Tarha and Marinkujan Päiväkoti, kindergartens
- Husula School, a primary school with classes 1-6
- Sale Husula, a grocery store
- Meijän Heikki Oy, a building company

== Sources ==
- Sjöström (2011), "Y-DNA and records of medieval land inheritance in Rolandh and Tepponen lineages of Vehkalahti, Finland", Foundations: Journal of the Foundation for Medieval Genealogy, volume 3 issue 6 (2011 July) pages 527..563
