= Smack (Finnish band) =

Finnish rock band

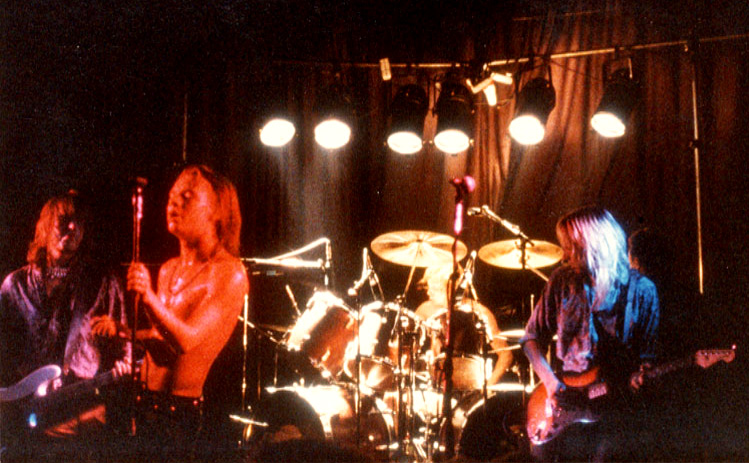
- Smack in 1986

Background information
- Origin: Helsinki, Finland
- Genres: Garage rock; glam rock; punk rock
- Years active: 1982–1990
- Labels: Cityboy; Eden; Enigma; Columbia; Sony BMG; Cleopatra
- Past members: Claude; Manchuria; Cheri Martin; Kartsa; Kinde; Rane Raitsikka; Jimi Sero; Repa Kauppila; Juki Marjala; Sam Yaffa
- Website: smackonyou.com

Smack was a Finnish rock band that was active from 1982 to 1990. Although Smack never achieved huge commercial success, they have a very strong cult following and they are regarded as one of the most influential Finnish rock bands. Smack has been cited as a major influence for bands such as Guns n Roses, Mudhoney and Nirvana.

Smack released a total of four studio albums: Smack On You (1984), Rattlesnake Bite (1985), Salvation (1987), and Radical (1988). In addition to these, a live album titled Live Desire (1986) was also released. The band took their musical influences from punk rock and garage bands like The Stooges, New York Dolls and the classic rock of The Rolling Stones and The Doors.

== History ==
=== Formation and early days (1982–1984) ===
Smack was formed in self-managed social centre and music venue Lepakko in Helsinki, 1982 by vocalist Claude Peltola and bassist Cheri Martin. The original lineup also included guitarists Manchuria and Kartsa Marjanen, along with drummer Juki Marjala.In late 1983, Lido Salonen signed them to his Cityboy label, which had distribution with Polarvox. Lido was also running a booking agency, so he became their record label, agent and personal manager all in one. In December 1983, Smack toured with Hanoi Rocks in Finland.

Their debut single "Criminal" was released in April,1984. Soon after the single was released, Kinde Leskinen replaced Juki Marjala on drums and the band went back into the studio to record their first album. T.T. Oksala, a prolific producer and sometime guitarist, was chosen to produce. He would continue to produce all but the band's final album.

=== Smack On You and Rattlesnake Bite (1984–1986) ===
The debut album, Smack On You is considered one of the most influential punk rock albums in Finnish rock music history. It was released in September 1984. A few months later, Rane Raitsikka replaced Kartsa as the second guitarist and the band released an EP, Walking on the Wire in the summer of 1985. Smack's second album, Rattlesnake Bite, was released in late 1985, offering a more refined musical style than their punk rock debut. Notable tracks include the ballad "Somewhere Out of the Day," and the intense interpretation of The Monkees "I’m Not Your Stepping Stone." Smack On You and Rattlesnake Bite were later released in the U.S. on Enigma Records.

In mid-1986, Smack released a cover version of the Rolling Stones classic "Paint it Black" It shot to #8 on Finnish charts and the band filmed a promo video for the song with the director Pete Europa. Soon after the video was released, Jimi Sero, an old acquaintance of the band, replaced Cheri and became Smack's new bassist. In June,1986 Smack was one of the headlining acts at the Provinssirock festival and their performance was broadcast live on national TV in Finland.

=== Live Desire, Salvation and Radical (1986–1988) ===
In September 1986 the band recorded live performances at the Tavastia Club in Helsinki and in Husula Casino in Hamina. Highlights from these shows were later released on the live album Live Desire in 1986. Live Desire captured the bands brutal energy and it covers best of their early material. The gorgeous gatefold sleeve, featuring Claude on the cover and a collage of live shots within, is easily the band's best album packaging.

The third studio album "Salvation" was recorded at Trident Studios in London at the end of 1986 and released in 1987. The band was unhappy with the production on Salvation, but the album shot to #2 on Finnish charts and marked the band's biggest commercial success in Finland. In the summer of 1987, Smack went on tour in the United States. Members of the Guns n Roses attended their live gigs in Los Angeles. Following this newfound success, the double LP collection, "State of Independence," was released in 1988, featuring tracks from the first three studio albums.

Smack recorded demos for the next album with British music producer Jim Pembroke, but it was Pave Maijanen who was selected by the band to produce their fourth and final album "Radical", released later in 1988. While "Radical" may not have reached the same level of success as their previous albums, it still contained standout tracks like "Set Me Free," "Little Sister," and "Mad Animal Shuffle"

=== Final years in Los Angeles (1989–1990) ===
By the spring 1989, Smack was on the verge of breaking up. Kinde decided to leave the group due to musical disagreements. Rane Raitsikka, Manchuria and Claude decided to pack everything up and move to Los Angeles. Jimi Sero decided to stay in Finland and so he left the group. Smack quickly found a new drummer in Repa "Rantsila" Kauppila, but they went through a succession of bass players, most notably Jimmy Ashhurst and Steve Counsel, before recruiting ex-Hanoi Rocks and Jetboy bassist Sami Yaffa. This final line-up of Smack recorded the songs "Can You Dig It" and "Crazy River" with the producer Michael Doman for an intended EP, in December 1989. Sami Yaffa was credited as Ulan Bator for contractual reasons, because he was still in Jetboy at the time and had been asked not to use his real name by Jetboy's management.

Smack toured in California for a year, but failed to secure a new record deal. The move to Los Angeles was just a temporary fix for the ailing band, who now spent most of their time partying. In July 1990, Claude grew frustrated and disbanded the group, he informed his bandmates that he was heading back to Finland.

=== After the Smack ===
After returning to Helsinki, Claude formed a new band The Fishfaces and in 1993, they released a studio album Love Songs For Hyenas. In 1996, Claude joined forces with Jyrki 69, the lead singer of the Finnish goth metal band The 69 Eyes to form a side project The Fellow Reptiles. They released an EP "Yours Truly" and had plans for an album of duets, but the band broke up, when Claude died.

On September 22, 1996, Claude died of heart failure. He was 30 years old. His book of poems "Julmia ovat valvotut unet" was published posthumously.

In 2007, Smack compilation double CD titled "In Your Face 1982–1990" was released by Sony BMG, featuring studio tracks and previously unreleased live recordings.

In July 2015, an American independent record label, Cleopatra Records released previously unreleased concert recording from Smack, "Live in Helsinki 1986" The fourteen-track album includes liner notes by Jyrki 69 of the Finnish goth band the 69 Eyes.

In May 2021, the official Smack biography book "Smack - Kuolemaantuomitun laulu" was published by Like Kustannus. The book was written by the journalist, musician, Jarkko Jokelainen, also known as Jay Burnside, the drummer of Flaming Sideburns.

== In pop culture ==
Nirvana covered Smack's song "Run Rabbit Run" at some live performances in 1988.

Members of the Guns N' Roses and Mudhoney have praised Smack in interviews as one of their major influences.

The lead singer of Danish cowpunk band D-A-D, Jesper Binzer, said on his radio show that Smack was the reason for starting his band. This happened on 12 March 2017 on his radio show MyRock MyWay on the Danish radio channel MyRock.

American garage rock band The Superbees covered Smack's song "Run Rabbit Run" on their debut album High Volume, in 2002

== Discography ==
=== Albums ===
- Smack On You (Cityboy, 1984)
- Rattlesnake Bite (Cityboy, 1985)
- Live Desire (Cityboy, 1986)
- Salvation (Eden, 1987)
- Radical (CBS, 1988)
- Live In Helsinki 1986 (Cleopatra), 2015)

=== Compilations ===
- The Collection – State of Independence (Cityboy, 1988)
- Two Originals – Salvation & Radical (Columbia, 1992)
- In Your Face 1982–1990 (Sony BMG, 2007)

=== Singles and EPs ===
- Criminal (Cityboy, 1984, 7"; reissued in 1997 via Zen Garden)
- Walking on the Wire (Cityboy, 1985, 12")
- Stepping Stone (Cityboy, 1985, 7")
- Paint It Black (Cityboy, 1986, 12")
- The Only Salvation (Eden, 1987, 7")
- Look Around (Eden, 1987, 7")
- Mad Animal Shuffle (CBS, 1988, 7")
- I Want Somebody (CBS, 1988, 7")
- Little Sister (CBS, 1988, 7")
- Can You Dig It (Columbia, 1989, CD single)
