= Pertti Neumann =

Finnish musician and singer (born 1959)

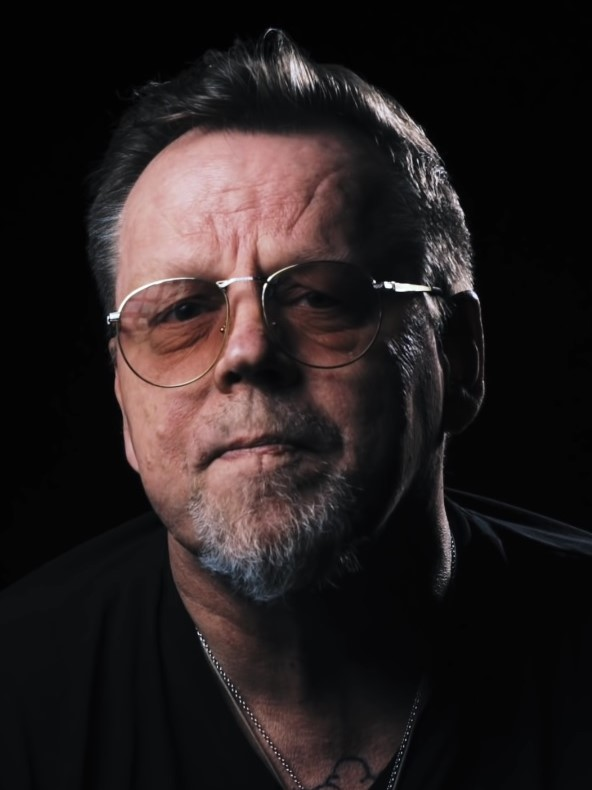
Neumann in 2019

Pertti Olavi "Nipa" Neumann (originally Nieminen, born 11 October 1959 in Pori, Finland) is a Finnish musician, the singer of the band Dingo and a songwriter. He has also appeared as the vocalist of the bands MAC, Bwana and S.E.X.. Neumann currently lives in Helsinki.

== Before musical career ==
Neumann was born in Pori on 11 October 1959. His childhood home was located in the district of Päärnäinen. Both of Neumann's parents worked as postal workers. In addition to his parents, his family included a big brother and a little sister.

Neumann's parents divorced when he was 12 years old. After the divorce the family moved to the district of Pormestarinluoto, which had a reputation of a violent district at the time.

Neumann has said he did poorly at school. He advanced to oppikoulu from the fourth class of kansakoulu (this was before the peruskoulu reform in Finland in the 1970s uniting the two stages of primary school into one). Neumann has later recollected he did fairly well at school until the second class of oppikoulu when he started becoming interested in "other things" such as music instead.

Neumann quit school at the age of 15 and enlisted on the tanker Tervi as a seaman. Neumann served as a sailor until he went to serve his military service on the minelayer ship Keihässalmi at the age of 17. After his military service he worked as a dishwasher, a postal worker and a cleaner and later enlisted on the ship Sandviken carrying paper to North and South America. After a sailor career of eight months Neumann returned to Finland and bought a microphone and amplifiers with the money he had saved.

In the early 1990s Neumann returned to the sea for a short time after he had temporarily grown weary of his musical career.

== Career ==
=== 1980s ===
In the late 1970s and early 1980s Neumann played many different bands from Pori, including Sir 59 and Bwana. These bands were short-lived and many of them shared some of the same members. In 1981 Neumann joined the band MAC, which also became Neumann's first band to publish an album.

At the same time "Neumann" was established as his artist name. The name was invented by Pepe Laaksonen who was playing in MAC at the time. Before this he was also known in Pori as "Sting". MAC broke up in 1982 after publishing two singles.

==== Dingo ====
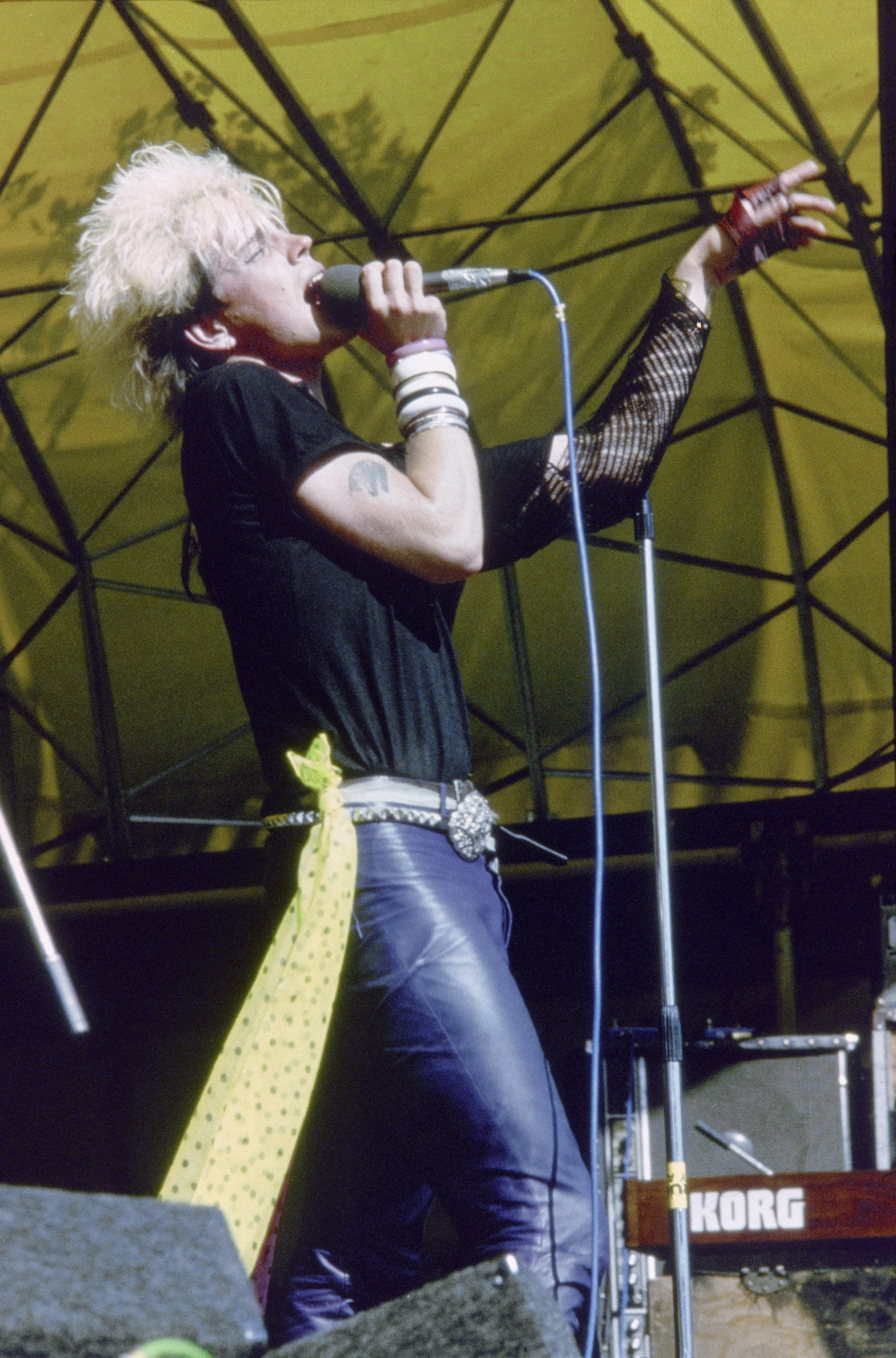
Neumann at a concert in Kaivopuisto in summer 1984

After MAC Neumann founded a new band. At first the band was named Sous-Pierre which was shortened to Soho. In the end the name of the band was established as Dingo. Dingo made its breakthrough in 1984 and soon became one of the all-time most popular Finnish bands. Dingo caused an unprecedented teen hysteria in Finland.

The rapidly risen popularity of Dingo and the ensuing teen hysteria led to a situation where the band members no longer had private lives. The most enthusiastic fans set up camp around the homes of the band members in hopes of getting an autograph. There were also organised tours to Pori including views of the band members' homes.

The band members started getting frustrated with the side effects caused by the huge popularity of the band and the number of interviews was limited. For security reasons, newspaper and magazine photographers were no longer allowed on stager of at the backstage rooms. Dingo also limited the number of autograph sessions they organised, and no longer stayed to give autographs to fans after their concerts. In the press, this heightened security was seen as arrogance and the press started writing about Dingo in a more critical fashion.

Dingo's popularity started to wane in 1986 and the band's third album Pyhä klaani got bad reviews. Neumann started having more and more arguments with the rest of the band. As the band's figurehead and principal songwriter Neumann's income was higher than that of the other band members, and his swanky spending annoyed the others. Neumann is also said to have said to the rest of the band that Dingo would not exist without him. The worst of the arguments were between Neumann and the keyboard player Pete Nuotio. During the recording of the album Pyhä klaani Neumann and Nuotio went to record their parts at different times as they did not want to be present at the recording studio at the same time.

In addition to the waning popularity and internal arguments Dingo started having growing financial difficulties. The company founded to back the band ended up going bankrupt. The problems eventually led to the band breaking up. During a concert in Tuiskula, Nivala on 4 October 1986 Neumann announced that this concert would be their last. The break-up was announced to the press at a press conference held on 7 October 1986. All future appearances of the band were also cancelled.

==== After Dingo ====
After Dingo had broken up Neumann started his solo career. Shortly before Dingo had broken up Neumann published his solo album Albion. The biggest hit on the album was Naiselleni, which was a Finnish translation of the Moody Blues song For My Lady. The music style of the album was significantly different from Dingo, and the album had a great deal of influence from folk music. The band backing Neumann's singing up on the album was Korkkijalka, a Finnish band playing traditional Irish music. The album remains Neumann's only solo album having sold for gold.

Neumann's first publication as a solo artist was the summer 1985 charity single Mennään hiljaa markkinoille.

In 1987 Neumann founded a new band called S.E.X. The band was short-lived and it broke up before it had published its first album, also named S.E.X. The album's sales were minuscule compared to the sales of Dingo's previous albums.

In early 1988 Neumann founded yet another new band called Neumann & Albion Rockers. The name was soon shortened to Neumann Band and then to Neumann. In 1989 the band published an album called Kotiinpaluu. The band, which had been assembled around Neumann, broke up before the album's publication, so the album was instead published as Neumann's solo album.

=== 1990s ===
From 1990 to 1992 Neumann served as the chief of production at EMI Finland. He cooperated with such bands as Neljä Ruusua and Topi Sorsakoski & Agents. Although Neumann enjoyed his job as chief of production, he started becoming interested in continuing his own musical career. In 1992 Neumann published his new solo album Tähti ja meripoika and an autobiography by the same name.

Dingo was founded again in 1993. The band published a comeback single called Perjantai which soon became a hit. In 1994 the band published a new studio album Via Finlandia whose sales ended up being modest in comparison to the band's earlier albums. After the concerts in summer 1994 the band went on hiatus.

After Dingo's brief return Neumann continued performing as a solo artist and appeared at duo concerts with Iku Tukiainen. In 1996 he published a new solo album called Nimeni on Neumann.

In 1998 Dingo performed at the Hartwall Arena with their most popular line-up in their first concert in 12 years. The performance was part of the Finlandia Trophy figure skating competition. The band continued performing with their most popular line-up until 2002.

=== 2000s ===
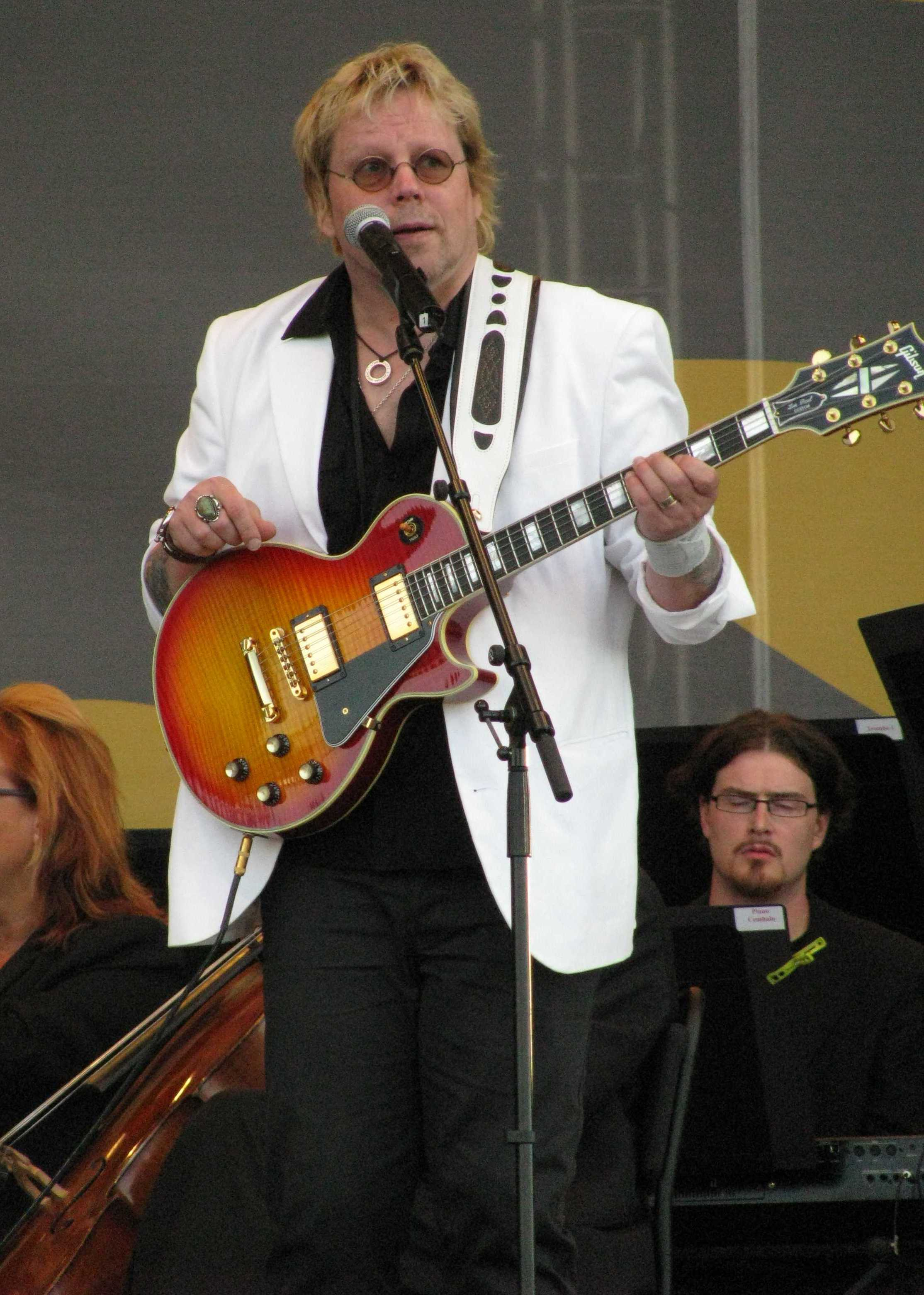
Neumann performing in his home city of Pori in 2008

Dingo went on hiatus in early 2002 after internal arguments. Band members Pete Nuotio and Juha Seittonen left the band because Dingo had not managed to create new music despite several attempts. In an interview, Neumann said Dingo would continue despite changing members.

During Dingo's hiatus, Neumann continued performing solo and appeared on duo gigs with Dingo's former bass player Jarkko Eve. In 2002, Neumann founded a shop called "Western Rock Store" in central Pori, selling Native American clothes. In 2004, Neumann sold the store to another owner. In late 2002, Dingo performed at a concert in Tallinn, Estonia with a special line-up. The band's best known members did not agree to appear at the concert, so Neumann assembled a new line-up from other studio musicians. The other band members were insulted by this. Neumann said he was the owner of the Dingo trademark and could therefore form the band again. These disagreements broke the relationship between Neumann and the rest of the band for years and they wanted nothing to do with each other for a long time.

In 2004, Neumann started appearing again with a new Dingo line-up. As well as Neumann, the band included Dingo's original bass player Jarkko Eve and three new musicians. In 2005, the band released an album called Purppuraa.

In the 2000s, Dingo's line-up changed often. In 2008, Jarkko Eve quit the band, after which Neumann became the only remaining original member in the band. In 2008, Dingo published an album titled Humisevan harjun paluu.

=== 2010s ===
In the early 2010s Neumann continued performing with various line-ups under the name Dingo. As well as Dingo, he also appeared as a solo artist.

In autumn 2012 Neumann appeared at the first season of the Nelonen TV show Vain elämää, where seven Finnish artists performed songs from each other. In March 2013 Neumann published a new solo album called Oma Waterloo which he had originally planned to publish under the Dingo name.

Dingo returned to their most famous line-up once again in early 2017. This return was short-lived as Pete Nuotio and Juha Seittonen quit the band once again after the concerts in summer and autumn. Dingo continued performing with a partially new line-up. The book Dingo-kipparin lokikirja, a biographical interview of Neumann written by Salla Nazarenko and published by Into Kustannus was published in autumn 2017.

Neumann turned 60 years old in 2019. A new compilation album Greatest Hits: 60th Anniversary containing two new songs was published to celebrate this.

=== 2020s ===
In the 2020s Neumann has continued performing with Dingo and as a solo artist.

The film My Name Is Dingo (original Finnish name: Levoton Tuhkimo), a biographical film about Neumann and the early history of Dingo, premiered in 2024. The film is partly fictive.

== Private life ==
Neumann has been married twice. He first married his youth sweetheart "Marika". Although the couple had been dating since 1981 they were only married in 1987 after Dingo had broken up. The couple divorced in 1994. Marika has not appeared in public.

Neumann later married Diana Neumann (née Pitkämäki) in 2000. The couple have two sons, both born in the 2000s. The couple divorced in 2010.

Neumann dated the entrepreneur Tarja Malmström until 2014.

== See also ==
- Dingo
