= Niilo Yli-Vainio =

Finnish priest (1920–1981)

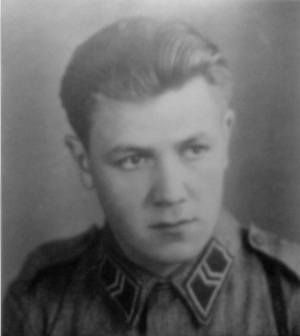
- Born: February 23, 1920; Alahärmä, Finland
- Died: 16 November 1981 (aged 61); Spain
- Occupations: Preacher, Author, Evangelist
- Known for: Jesus Christ, Faith healing, Bible
- Term: 1947–1981
- Spouse: Linnea (1940-)
- Children: Aino, Leevi, Ruut, Antti, Eeva

Niilo Antti Johannes Yli-Vainio (February 23, 1920 in Alahärmä - November 16, 1981 in Spain) was a Finnish Christian Charismatic leader.

He started preaching after having recovered from a heart condition during the 1950s and rose to fame during the late 1970s. Several alleged healing miracles and other spiritual experiences took place at his revival meetings. As a result, thousands of Finns converted to Pentecostalism.

Yli-Vainio started work as a pharmacist's assistant. When World War II started, he worked in a cartridge factory. It was there that he met Linnea whom he married in 1940. He then worked as an army medic. He became a Christian after WWII and started preaching in the Pentecostal denomination.

In 1976, after several illnesses, he traveled to Australia and experienced a ‘new anointing’. He returned to Finland and started holding large Christian meetings where he spoke of the message of God's love, forgiveness and the life-changing effect of personal faith. Healings and other spiritual manifestations were reported.

Under the influence of Yli-Vainio's meetings, many people professed a new faith in Christ, and several celebrities spoke about their conversion to faith. Many of the converts joined Pentecostal churches, but some also remained members of the majority Lutheran Church.

He wrote over 16 books including How could I be saved? and You can be filled with the Holy Spirit.

In 1981, a film was made focussing on the last few years of his life. The film was named White Butterfly (Valkoinen Yoperhonen) and included an interview with his daughter Aino.

== See also ==
- The Pentecostal Church of Finland
