= Niilo Paasivirta =

Finnish Internet personality

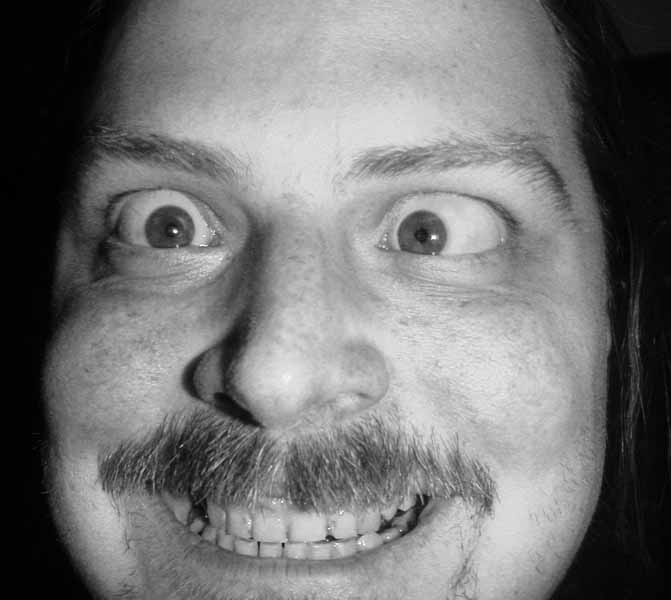
Niilo Paasivirta (2004)

Niilo Paasivirta is a Finnish Internet personality, who has become known for the Internet writings that parody fundamentalist Christian views. In Finland, he's best known for the essays called "Oikeat Mielipiteet" ("Correct Opinions"), and elsewhere for the "Love Thy Neighbor" and Game of Satan pages, that parody moral panic in role-playing games, as well as his Foreigner's Guide to Finland page. The pages were written at the time when the moral panic was being discussed, first in the mid-1990s, and the humorous approach was both disapproved of, and later, as the moral panic waned, approved of.

On several occasions, Paasivirta has said his date of birth is September 3, 1956, which is debatable, as the same interview also had wild claims about his "roots in nobility" and "special skills".

== Game of Satan ==
Game of Satan pages parody the anti-role-playing game movement. According to the pages, the role-playing games are anti-Christian, sinful, make the players worship Satan, practice (among other things) occultism, religions other than Christianity, paraphilias, turn them into members of sexual minorities, commit crimes, and go to Hell. Paasivirta himself described the page as follows:

I didn't think anyone would take it seriously...Thousands of people...read the page, and a few percent of them apparently took it seriously. They started to e-mail me, and I started collecting the e-mails. I have over 5 megabytes archive...I "enhanced" the page by adding the most outrageous and ridiculous claims I could think of, I added deliberate typos, many contradictions, and silly links, hoping that even the most ignorant person would immediately realize that the page is a joke. It didn't help...More hate mail kept coming no matter what.

The Game of Satan pages have gained some cult following. Many people have understood the joke, and supported the page for that reason, but some have thought the page was a real opinion of a "conservative Christian" and mocked people who had the same kind of views. It has been seen as one of the examples of Poe's law.

== Correct Opinions ==
Paasivirta writes essays called "Oikeat Mielipiteet", or "Correct Opinions", to mock conservative views. Their length varies, they're typically related to current matters, and take point of view which is exaggeratedly conservative, right-wing, pro-military, patriotic and racist, in vein of the similar conservative groups in the United States. In addition to the Usenet and Paasivirta's own home page, the essays have been published on a web page called Bittivuoto.net, and a computer magazine called Enter.

== Blasphemy accusations ==
In 1999, Paasivirta was investigated by police for allegedly violating Finnish blasphemy laws for the material published on his web page at the end of 1998. The prosecutor noted Paasivirta had posted blasphemous material and publicly agitated others to commit such crimes, but charges were not filed because the blasphemy was no longer treated as a criminal matter.

In the material, Paasivirta briefly and without any elaboration called God a "bull calf drone", "ectoplasm", "pickle being roasted in pig lard", "pedophile", "drug addict" and "career criminal". The page also had a phone number for the police tip line and admitted to violating blasphemy laws. Later, he claimed he was referring to the invisible pink unicorn rather than the Christian God. The material is no longer available on Paasivirta's home page.
