= Pave Maijanen =

Finnish singer (1950–2021)

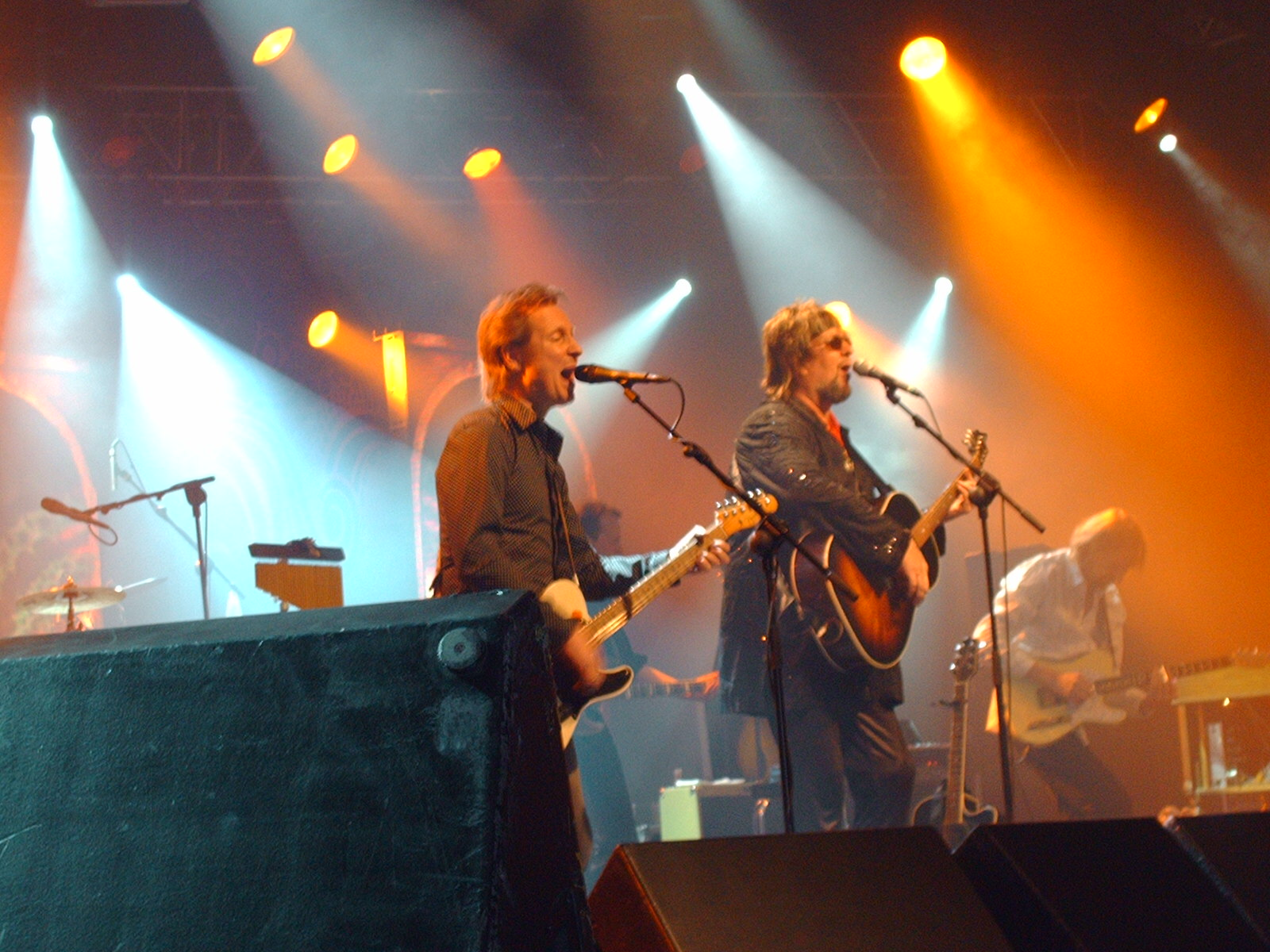
Hector and Pave Maijanen playing at a concert in Jyväskylä, Finland 2007

Pekka Juhani "Pave" Maijanen (3 September 1950 – 16 January 2021) was a Finnish musician, who worked as a singer, songwriter, bass player, keyboard player, drummer, guitarist and producer during his long career. As well as his own solo career, Maijanen was a member of The Royals, Rock'n'Roll Band, Pepe & Paradise and he was the keyboard player and producer of Dingo and the Hurriganes. Maijanen's first work as a producer was for the album Nuclear Nightclub by Wigwam.

== Career ==
Pave Maijanen was born in Lappeenranta, and became interested in music at the age of 6, when he started playing the harmonica. In the 1960s, he was already playing in several bands, the most famous of which was Mielikummitus, the background band of singer Kristian. Maijanen's music career continued as the bass player of the famous band Pepe & Paradise and as the vocalist of The Royals. Maijanen also acted as the vocalist on the albums of guitar virtuoso Albert Järvinen. Maijanen's first solo single "Fever" appeared in 1975. In the early 1980s, Maijanen founded the band Pave's Mistakes, which produced two albums. On the second album Pidä huolta Pave composed, wrote and interpreted his first Finnish recordings. The title song of the album became one of the greatest hits of 1981.

The first album to be named after only Maijanen was the solo album Tanssivat kengät, which appeared in 1983 and contained the disco funk hit "Aiaiai", published in the previous year. For the whole 1980s, Pave has produced Finnish rock and pop music on his solo records. Maijanen wrote most of his songs himself, under the pseudonym Maija Paavonen. Hector also wrote lyrics for Pave's records. In the middle 1980s, Pave Maijanen's solo career was at its most popular. The albums Maijanen (1984) and Palava sydän (1985) got the diamond record award and the album Maailman tuulet (1987) got the gold record award. Maijanen's hits also include Lähtisitkö, Jano, Joki ja meri, Elämän nälkä and Ikävä.

Maijanen was also a famous record producer in the 1980s. He produced Smack's final album Radical (1988) and he also produced albums for Hurriganes and Dingo. Maijanen has been called "the sixth Dingo" because he was actively involved in Dingo's activities in the 1980s and the band never went to the studio without him.

In the 1990s, Maijanen's career went into a downfall. His records didn't sell like they used to and a great misfortune was the last place at the Eurovision Song Contest 1992 with the song "Yamma Yamma". When his own solo career was quiet, Maijanen acted as the keyboard player on Dingo's comeback gigs from 1993 to 1994 and played all keyboard parts on Dingo's album Via Finlandia. At the end of the 1990s, Pave came back to the limelights, when the group "Mestarit Areenalla", consisting of him, Kirka, Hector and Pepe Willberg sold out at Finnish ice hockey halls and he also organised his own concert at the Helsinki Olympic Stadium, becoming the first ever Finnish artist to do so.

Pave Maijanen has been an employed musician and producer for his whole career, so he always worked in music.

Pave Maijanen has also produced music for the television. For example, the Finnish version of the theme song of the cartoon DuckTales is sung by him.

In September 2020 Maijanen revealed he had been diagnosed with amyotrophic lateral sclerosis (ALS) in autumn 2018 and that the disease had progressed to the point that he had to give up playing and singing. He died from his illness in January 2021, aged 70.

== Pseudonyms ==
- Maijanen Paavo
- Maijanen Pave
- Maija Paavonen (or M. Paavonen)

== Bands ==
- The Top Cats (1964)
- Ours (1965–1968)
- Kopet (1968–1969)
- Mielikummitus (1969–1970)
- Smoking (1970–1971)
- Pepe & Paradise (1971–1975)
- Wigwam (producer 1975, bass player 2018)
- Lauluyhtye Fyrkka (1974)
- Rock'n'Roll Band (1975 and 2005)
- The Royals (1975–1978)
- Mistakes (1980–1982)
- Hurriganes (1980) (keyboard player and producer)
- Dingo (producer 1984–1994, keyboard player 1993–1994)
- Mestarit (1997–2002)
- Hector & Pave Maijanen Duo (2003)

== Solo albums ==
- Fever / The Seventh Son (single, 1975)
- Tanssivat kengät (1983)
- Maijanen (1984)
- Palava sydän (1985)
- Maailman tuulet (1986)
- Would You (under the artist name Maya, 1987)
- Kuutamolla (1990)
- No joking (1991)
- Sirkus saapuu tivoliin (1994)
- Kohti uutta maailmaa (1998)
- Mustaa valkoisella (2000)
- Kaikessa rauhassa (2010)

Compilation albums

- Kaikki Nämä Vuodet 1969–2010 (2012)

Preceded by Kaija Kärkinen with Hullu yö	Finland in the Eurovision Song Contest; 1992	Succeeded by Katri Helena with Tule luo
