= Luonnossa =

Live album by Ismo Alanko Säätiö
- Released: April 1999
- Recorded: October 1998
- Genre: Rock
- Length: 105:38
- Label: Poko Rekords

Professional ratings
Review scores
Source	Rating
Soundi	5/5 stars
City	4/5 stars

Luonnossa (Finnish for "In the Wild") is the first live album of Ismo Alanko Säätiö, released in 1999. It contains songs from their debut album Pulu, as well as Ismo Alanko's earlier career with Hassisen Kone, Sielun Veljet and as a solo artist. The album was compiled of two concerts on the band's Tuulipuvun tuolla puolen tour, in Tampere and Joensuu. The Joensuu concert was also edited into a promotional video for the band.

== Track listing ==
Music and lyrics by Alanko, except where noted.

=== Disc 1 ===
1. "Hetki hautausmaalla"—4:35
2. "Kun Suomi putos puusta"—5:16
3. "Muoviruusuja omenapuissa"—4:34
4. "Pelataanko shakkia vai?"—4:49
5. "Extaasiin"—5:16
6. "Rakkaus on ruma sana"—4:18
7. "Seinät"—4:26
8. "Maalausliike"—4:18
9. "Värityskirja"—4:52
10. "Piste"—5:06

=== Disc 2 ===
1. "Masentunut ameeba"—4:49
2. "Pulu"—4:34
3. "Totuus vai tequila"—4:52
4. "Säkenöivä voima"—4:05
5. "Kuolemalla on monet kasvot"—6:54
6. "Rakkaudesta"—5:14
7. "Ihminen" (Alanko, Jukka Orma) -- 5:02
8. "Rakas rämä elämä"—3:06
9. "Karjalan kunnailla" (Alanko, Orma) -- 6:28
10. "Kulkurin iltakalja" (Alanko, Reijo Heiskanen, Harri Kinnunen, Jussi Kinnunen) -- 3:22
11. "Levottomat jalat"—4:17
12. "Tällä tiellä"—5:21

== Personnel ==
- Ismo Alanko -- vocals, guitar, piano
- Jussi Kinnunen -- bass, vocals
- Samuli Laiho—guitar, vocals
- Teho Majamäki -- percussion, marimba, vibraphone, farfisa
- Kimmo Pohjonen -- accordion, harmonica, vocals, thumb piano, harmonium
- Marko Timonen -- drums, percussion
