= Otteita Tuomari Nurmion laulukirjasta =

Studio album by Sielun Veljet
- Released: January 2007
- Recorded: 1990
- Genre: Blues rock, Indie rock, Post-punk
- Length: 39:28
- Label: EMI, Poko Rekords
- Producer: Jukka Orma

Professional ratings
Review scores
Source	Rating
Soundi	4/5 stars
Nyt.fi	4/5 stars
desibeli.net	5/5 stars

Otteita Tuomari Nurmion laulukirjasta is a tribute album by Sielun Veljet to Tuomari Nurmio, recorded in 1990 but only released in 2007. It is the only Sielun Veljet recording to top the Finnish album charts.

Sielun Veljet had already released several Tuomari Nurmio covers. Their first album, Sielun Veljet, contains "Huda huda" and Musta laatikko has five songs credited to Nurmio. Alf Forsman had even played in Nurmio's band before joining Sielun Veljet. Ismo Alanko has said that he sees Nurmio as "the absolute number one of Finnish songwriters, especially as a lyricist".

Three recorded songs were destroyed when the original tape was magnetized, including "Lasten mehuhetki", one of Nurmio's most popular songs.

== Track listing ==
Music and lyrics by Tuomari Nurmio.

1. "Älä itke Iines"—3:10
2. "Oi mutsi mutsi"—3:25
3. "Rion satamassa"—2:48
4. "Viiniä! Malja marttyyreille"—2:59
5. "Sunnuntaina"—2:42
6. "Liputtomat laivat"—3:26
7. "Hyvästi kotimaa"—2:36
8. "Oi mahtava totemi"—3:24
9. "Moskovan maailmanrodeo 2070"—2:11
10. "Maailmanpyörä palaa!"—2:00
11. "Kurja matkamies maan"—2:36
12. "Kulkuri ja maamies"—2:41
13. "Hunajainen paholainen"—2:23
14. "Huda huda"—3:07

== Personnel ==
- Ismo Alanko -- vocals, guitar, bass
- Jukka Orma—guitar, organ, bass, vocals
- Jouko Hohko—bass, vocals
- Alf Forsman -- drums, percussion
