= Ismo Alanko Säätiö =

Finnish rock group

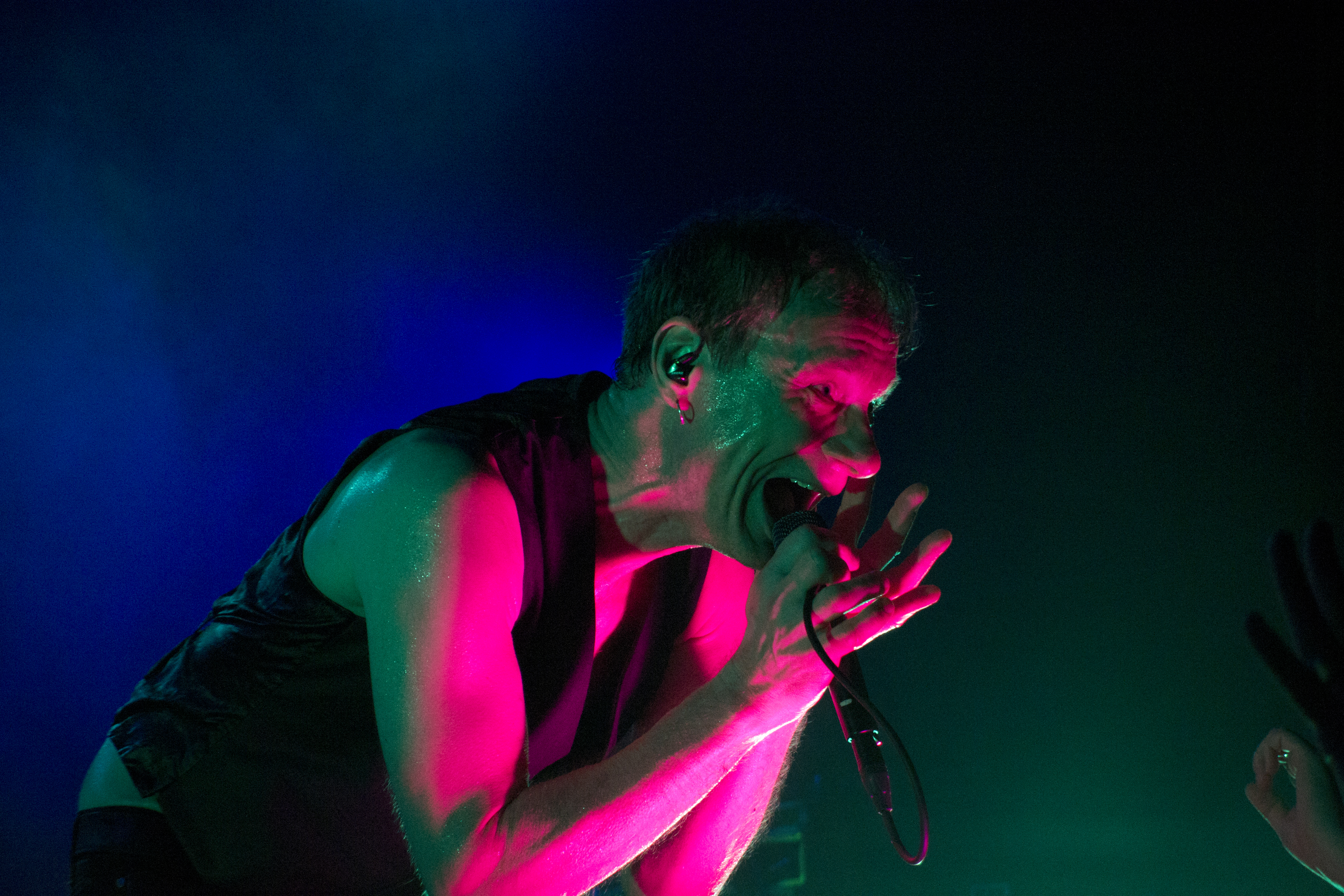

Background information
- Origin: Finland
- Genres: Alternative rock, Art rock
- Years active: 1997–2007
- Labels: Poko Records
- Past members: Ismo Alanko; Jussi Kinnunen; Teho Majamäki; Kimmo Pohjonen; Marko Timonen; Samuli Laiho; Ville Kangas; Jarno Karjalainen; Timo Kämäräinen; Riku Mattila

Ismo Alanko Säätiö (Finnish pronunciation: [ˈismo ˈɑlɑŋko ˈsæːtiø]) was a Finnish rock group led by Ismo Alanko. The band featured an ever-changing lineup of musicians and can be considered an extension of Alanko's solo career. The band's name is Finnish for "Ismo Alanko Foundation".

Early Säätiö's sound was influenced by folk music and featured Kimmo Pohjonen's accordion in a prominent role. The band played songs from Alanko's earlier career with Hassisen Kone, Sielun Veljet and from his solo career, as well as original songs which were almost exclusively written by Alanko. Their music also had some progressive rock and classical influences. In later years they concentrated on more straightforward rock songs.

== History ==
=== Beginning ===
Ismo Alanko Säätiö was formed in 1997 during the recording of what became their debut album, Pulu. The original lineup consisted of Alanko himself, accordionist Kimmo Pohjonen, percussionist Teho Majamäki, bassist Jussi Kinnunen and drummer Marko Timonen. In addition to singing, Alanko played guitar, piano and cello on the album.

Pohjonen's avant garde accordion sound had a prominent role in early Säätiö's albums and live performances. Pohjonen would often climb on top of amplifiers or jump around the stage with his instrument. He has been called "the Hendrix of the accordion" by Finnish musical press due to his stage presence and use of electronic effects such as the wah-wah pedal. Alanko has called Pohjonen the band's "solo guitarist".

In autumn 1998 Säätiö went on a concert tour around Finland, playing new arrangements of Alanko's earlier songs (including Hassisen Kone and Sielun Veljet material) in addition to Säätiö originals. The performances were held in concert halls, which allowed Alanko to plan the performances carefully as whole knowing that he'd have the audience's full attention. Guitarist Samuli Laiho joined the band before the tour. A live album was recorded during the tour and released in 1999 under the title Luonnossa. The concert tour was named Tuulipuvun tuolla puolen ("Beyond the tracksuit") after the closing track of Pulu.

=== Labra project and Sisäinen solarium ===
In 2000, Säätiö participated in a theatrical Labra project designed musically by Alanko and visually by designer, interior architect and sculptor Stefan Lindfors. The show was a mixture of a rock concert and musical theatre held inside a giant metal egg. The centre of the egg was reserved for the band, and the audience was placed on all sides, very close to the musicians. Alanko has said that he enjoyed having the audience so near: "At first I thought it was a bit claustrophobic, but then I started to enjoy it. You can really communicate directly with people." The beginning of the performance contained a shamanistic atmosphere with imagery from Finnish mythology.

The music from the Labra stage show was recorded and released as Säätiö's second studio album, Sisäinen solarium, in 2000. Alanko had hoped that the album would be recognized outside of Finland, even though it was sung in Finnish, but no international release or promotion was made. In Finland it, like Pulu, sold gold in less than a year. Bassist Jussi Kinnunen left the band in 2000 and was replaced by Jarno Karjalainen.

=== Hallanvaara ===
Säätiö's next project was Hallanvaara, released in 2002. Instead of arranging the music for the available group of musicians like on the previous albums, Alanko and producer Riku Mattila decided that a larger orchestra was needed to play the material Alanko had written. Two different string ensembles (an orchestra and a quartet) and a large number of session musicians were used and the arrangements were provided by several different people at Alanko's request. The musical saw, a practically unknown instrument in Finnish popular music, was used on the song "Pojanmaa". Many listeners found the album "difficult" and "artistic", and it was the first Säätiö album not to top the Finnish album charts, peaking at #2. By the time of the recordings, Pohjonen and Majamäki had already left the band in order to concentrate on other projects.

Hallanvaara was followed in 2002 by a concert tour with Ville Kangas's string quartet that included Hallanvaara songs and orchestrally-flavoured arrangements of Alanko's earlier material. The shows were performed with the stage divided in half: Säätiö on the other side, and the strings on the other side. During the autumn and winter, Säätiö continued touring in a rock setting, playing club gigs around Finland.

=== Final years ===
By 2003, Säätiö was playing for some radically different audiences. They appeared at a classical music festival Suvisoitto in Porvoo; at a wine festival in Kuopio; at Kajaani Poetry Week; and on rock festivals such as Ruisrock in Turku. Ville Kangas continued in the band without his quartet, playing violin and keyboards.

In contrast to the orchestral arrangements and huge array of musicians used on Hallanvaara, 2004's Minä ja pojat was recorded in a pure rock setting, with admitted influences from contemporary rock groups such as Queens of the Stone Age and System of a Down. Alanko, whose career had started with punk rock in Hassisen Kone, has said that the album was a sort of return to his roots. The band recruited Riku Mattila, who had produced Hallanvaara, as a third guitarist during the sessions of Minä ja pojat.

Säätiö's seventh and final album, Ruuhkainen Taivas, was recorded in the same three-guitar rock group format. Helsingin Sanomat wrote that the material reminds of Alanko's solo debut Kun Suomi putos puusta and of even earlier material like Hassisen Kone. Ismo Alanko säätiö disbanded in 2007, and Alanko began playing duet gigs with percussionist Teho Majamäki as Ismo Alanko Teholla.

== Members ==
- Ismo Alanko -- vocals, guitar, piano, cello (1997–2007)
- Jussi Kinnunen -- bass, vocals (1997–2000)
- Teho Majamäki -- marimba, vibraphone, organ, percussion (1997–2002)
- Kimmo Pohjonen -- accordion, thumb piano, vocals (1997–2002)
- Marko Timonen -- drums, percussion (1997–2007)
- Samuli Laiho —- guitar, piano, vocals (1998–2003)
- Ville Kangas -- violin, keyboards (2000–2003)
- Jarno Karjalainen—bass, vocals (2000–2007)
- Timo Kämäräinen—guitar (2002–2007)
- Riku Mattila—guitar (2004–2007)

== Discography ==
=== Studio albums ===
Released	Title	Translation	Chart Peak	Certification	Label
1998	Pulu	Pigeon	1	Gold (1998)	Poko
2000	Sisäinen solarium	Solarium Within	1	Gold (2000)	Poko
2002	Hallanvaara	Risk of Frost	2	Gold (2004)	Poko
2004	Minä ja pojat	Me and the Boys	-	Gold (2005)	Poko
2006	Ruuhkainen Taivas	Crowded Heaven	2	-	Poko

=== Live albums ===
Released	Title	Translation	Chart Peak	Label
1999	Luonnossa	In the Wild	11	Poko
2003	Elävää musiikkia	Living Music	32	Poko

=== DVDs ===
Released	Title	Chart peak	Label
2005	Live DVD	-	Poko

=== Singles ===
Released	Title	Translation	Chart Peak	Label
1998	"Tuulipuvun tuolla puolen"	"Beyond the Tracksuit"	9	Poko
1998	"Pulu"	"Pigeon"	-	Poko
1998	"Rakkaus on ruma sana"	"Love Is a Bad Word"	-	Poko
1999	"Joululevy"	"Christmas Album"	2	Poko
2000	"Sisäinen solarium"	"Solarium Within"	13	Poko
2000	"e-mail.internet.seksi.seksi.seksi"	"e-mail.internet.sex.sex.sex"	-	Poko
2000	"Tyhmää"	"Stupid"	-	Poko
2001	"Nokian takana"	"Beyond Nokia"	7	Poko
2002	"Paratiisin puu"	"Paradise Tree"	7	Poko
2002	"Risteys"	"Crossing"	-	Poko
2003	"Kadonnut suudelma"	"The Lost Kiss"	-	Poko
2004	"Pentti"	"Pentti"	6	Poko
2004	"Rakkaus hallitsee"	"Love Reigns"	9	Poko
2006	"Paskiainen"	"Bastard"	9	Poko
