= Hallanvaara =

Studio album by Ismo Alanko Säätiö
- Released: 2002
- Genre: Alternative rock, Art rock
- Length: 53:33
- Label: Poko Rekords
- Producer: Riku Mattila

Ismo Alanko Säätiö chronology
Sisäinen solarium (2000)	Hallanvaara (2002)	Minä ja pojat (2004)

Professional ratings
Review scores
Source	Rating
Mesta.net	4/5 stars
Soundi	3/5 stars

Hallanvaara (Finnish for Risk of Frost) is the third studio album of Ismo Alanko Säätiö. Ismo Alanko composed the music and asked different people to provide the arrangements for the album. In addition to Säätiö personnel, the album features two string ensembles: Arttu Takalon Jouset (Arttu Takalo's Strings) and Ville Kankaan Jousikvartetti (Ville Kangas' String Quartet).

Kimmo Pohjonen, who had already left the band before the recording of Hallanvaara, plays accordion on "Peilikuva".

== Track listing ==
All compositions by Ismo Alanko except "Töiden jälkeen" by Alanko and Arttu Takalo. All lyrics by Alanko.

1. "Risteys" _{(arr. Takalo)} -- 4:18
2. "Suurenmoinen ruumissaatto" _{(arr. Riku Mattila, Valtteri Tynkkynen)} -- 4:55
3. "Maailmanparantaja" _{(arr. Alanko, Samuli Laiho, Marko Timonen)} -- 5:26
4. "Nurkkapöytä" [instrumental] _{(arr. Laiho)} -- 0:48
5. "Kukaan ei tunne mua" _{(arr. Ahti Marja-Aho)} -- 4:29
6. "Pieni itsemurha" _{(arr. Alanko)} -- 3:26
7. "Paratiisin puu" _{(arr. Tynkkynen, Timonen)} -- 3:54
8. "Kadonnut suudelma" _{(arr. Alanko)} -- 4:22
9. "Pojanmaa" _{(arr. Alanko, Laiho, Timonen)} -- 4:10
10. "Kullankaivajat" _{(arr. Alanko, Ville Kangas, Timonen)} -- 5:07
11. "Tulessamakaaja" _{(arr. Alanko, Laiho)}-- 1:14
12. "Peilikuva" _{(arr. Alanko, Safka Pekkonen, Timonen)} -- 5:12
13. "Töiden jälkeen" [instrumental] _{(arr. Takalo)} -- 2:05
14. "Hallanvaara" _{(arr. Marja-Aho)} -- 4:07

== Personnel ==
=== Ismo Alanko Säätiö ===
- Ismo Alanko -- vocals, piano, cello, guitar, electric piano, whistling
- Samuli Laiho—acoustic guitar, backing vocals
- Jarno Karjalainen -- bass guitar, double bass
- Marko Timonen -- drums, percussion

=== Arttu Takalon Jouset ===
- Arttu Takalo -- conductor
- Katariina Junnila-Kaikkonen -- violin
- Kati Kiraly—violin
- Maija Linkola—violin
- Eriikka Maalismaa—violin
- Reeta Maalismaa—violin
- Anna Tanskanen—violin
- Inkeri Vänskä—violin
- Janne Ahvenainen -- viola
- Lotta Poijärvi—viola
- Päivi Ahonen—cello
- Ville Turunen—cello
- Marko Mikkola—double bass

=== Ville Kankaan Jousikvartetti ===
- Ville Kangas—violin
- Anni Järvelä—violin
- Sanna-Mari Helen—viola
- Osmo Ikonen—cello

=== Session musicians ===
- Ilkka Alanko—backing vocals
- Anni Haapaniemi -- oboe
- Jukka Hakoköngäs—piano
- Juhani Hapuli -- Thai gong, celesta
- Erja Joukamo-Ampuja -- French horn
- Seppo Kantonen—piano, electric piano
- Pentti Lahti -- piccolo, flute, bass flute, tenor and alto saxophone, clarinet, bass clarinet
- Ahti Marja-Aho—piano
- Riku Mattila—guitar, keyboards, sitar, glockenspiel
- Puka Oinonen -- saw
- Timo Paasonen -- flugelhorn, trumpet
- Safka Pekkonen -- organ, electric piano, piano
- Kimmo Pohjonen -- accordion
- Erik Siikasaari—double bass
