= Pop-musiikkia =

Single by Neljä baritonia
- Released: November 1997
- Recorded: October 1997
- Genre: Pop
- Length: 4:03
- Label: Poko Records
- Songwriter: Ismo Alanko

"Pop-musiikkia" (in English "Pop Music") is a single released in November 1997 by Finnish artists Neljä baritonia ("Four baritones"), a band consisting of Ismo Alanko, Kalle Ahola (of Don Huonot), Ilkka Alanko (of Neljä Ruusua) and A. W. Yrjänä (of CMX). It is the only song the band recorded, and has been certified double platinum in Finland – currently the song ranks 61st on the list of the best-selling singles of all time in the country, with sales of over 17,000 copies. The song's music video was directed by Tommi Pietiläinen.

== Charts ==
The song entered the Finnish charts in 1997 and stayed there for a total of 34 weeks. It held the first position for eight weeks from December 1997 to February 1998. As of March 2008, it is placed third on the Finnish charts all-time top 100, after "Teit meistä kauniin" by Apulanta and "Over the Hills and Far Away" by Nightwish.

== Compilations ==
The following compilation albums include the original version of "Pop-musiikkia":

- Pure Finnish Rock - Aitoa Suomirockia (Poko Rekordsin Historia 1977-2004) (various artists, 2004)
- Soundi DVD 2006 (various artists, 2005)
- Taiteilijaelämää Vuosilta 1989-2006 (Ismo Alanko, 2006)

== Personnel ==
- Ismo Alanko - guitar, vocals
- Kalle Ahola - guitar, vocals
- Ilkka Alanko - guitar, vocals
- A. W. Yrjänä - guitar, vocals
- Jukka Hakoköngäs - keyboards
- Jussi Kinnunen - bass
- Anssi Nykänen - drums

== Covers ==
- Raptori - "Hiphopmusiikkia" (parody on Ouu-Raisakson!, 1999)
- Ismo Alanko Säätiö (live on Elävää musiikkia, 2004)
- Idols-finalists (Idols 2007, 2007)

== See also ==
- List of best-selling singles in Finland
