= Sielun Veljet (album) =

Studio album by Sielun Veljet
- Released: 1983
- Genre: Alternative rock
- Length: 49:17
- Label: Poko Records
- Producer: Sielun Veljet

Sielun Veljet chronology
Sielun Veljet (1983)	Hei soturit (1984)

Professional ratings
Review scores
Source	Rating
Soundi	4/5 stars

Sielun Veljet is the 1983 debut album of the band of the same name. "Huda huda", a Tuomari Nurmio cover, was later included on the band's tribute album Otteita Tuomari Nurmion laulukirjasta.

"Yö erottaa pojasta miehen" was covered by Neljä Ruusua on the 2002 various artists tribute album Säkenöivää voimaa - tribuutti Sielun Veljille.

== Track listing ==
Music by Ismo Alanko, except where noted. Tracks 1–10 arranged by Sielun Veljet.

1. "Hovimestari ja hymyilevät käärmeet" (Alanko, Orma, Pekkonen)—6:52
2. "Tuulelta vastauksen saan"—3:47
3. "Lammassusi"—6:22
4. "Yö erottaa pojasta miehen"—3:55
5. "Pieni pää"—5:19
6. "Karjalan kunnailla" (Alanko, Orma)—3:31
7. "Unelmien virtuoosi"—6:24
8. "Emil Zatopek" (Alanko, Hohko, Orma)—3:08
9. "Politiikkaa"—7:39
10. "Turvaa"—5:14
11. "Huda huda" (Nurmio)—3:58

Track 4 was originally misprinted as "Yö erottaa pojan miehestä" on the album's liner notes.

== Personnel ==
- Ismo Alanko—vocals, guitar, bass
- Jukka Orma—guitar, vocals, saxophone
- Jouko Hohko—guitar, bass, vocals
- Alf Forsman—drums
- Jouni Mömmö—synthesizer (credited as "weird sounds")
