= Alanko =

Alanko is a Finnish surname. Notable people with the surname include:

- Ismo Alanko (born 1960), Finnish rock singer/songwriter
- Outi Alanko-Kahiluoto (born 1966), Finnish MP, representing the Green League
- Kari Alanko, Finnish ambassador to Vietnam
- Ilkka Alanko, Finnish singer
