= Sisäinen solarium =

Studio album by Ismo Alanko Säätiö
- Released: 2000
- Genre: Alternative rock, Art rock
- Length: 61:37
- Label: Poko Rekords
- Producer: Janne Haavisto

Ismo Alanko Säätiö chronology
Pulu (1998)	Sisäinen solarium (2000)	Hallanvaara (2002)

Professional ratings
Review scores
Source	Rating
Soundi	3/5 stars

Sisäinen solarium (Finnish for "the Inner Solarium" or "Solarium Within") is the second album of Ismo Alanko Säätiö, released in 2000. It is similar in style to their debut album, Pulu, with its folk influences and extensive use of Kimmo Pohjonen's accordion. It, as its predecessor, reached #1 on the Finnish album charts.

The album's tracks were originally composed for Labra show made for Culture Year 2000 with Stefan Lindfors. Lindfors handled the visual design while Alanko handled the musical side with Säätiö. Alanko told that he wanted to make music that was Finnish, but that sounded universal so that language wouldn't be a barrier while listening to it. He also wanted a choir for the project (this can be clearly heard on the album's opening track "Kirskainen Hyvätyinen") which has strong similarities to Värttinä's vocal harmonies in songs such as Kosovo.

According to Alanko the Labra was a long, heavy and demanding project that you normally shouldn't even think of doing. He was impressed that it was finished on time.

The thirteenth track "Minuutin hiljaisuus" consists of one minute of silence.

== Track listing ==
Music by Ismo Alanko Säätiö, except where noted. Lyrics by Alanko.

1. "Kirskainen Hyvätyinen"—4:10
2. "Sisäinen solarium"—5:23
3. "Kosovo"—7:54
4. "Tyhmää"—2:30
5. "Media" (Alanko) -- 2:49
6. "Datsun" (Alanko) -- 5:30
7. "Paha silmä" (Alanko) -- 3:44
8. "T" (Alanko) -- 2:56
9. "Sana leijui" (Alanko) -- 5:13
10. "Vallankumous"—4:10
11. "e-mail.internet.seksi.seksi.seksi"—3:21
12. "Ehkäpä elämä onkin vain sitä miltä tuntuu" (Alanko) -- 3:34
13. "Minuutin hiljaisuus"—1:00
14. "Sampo"—9:03

== Personnel ==
- Ismo Alanko -- vocals, cello
- Kimmo Pohjonen -- accordion, harmonica, kalimba, harmonium, vocals
- Teho Majamäki -- vibraphone, marimba, percussion
- Samuli Laiho -- guitar, strings, vocals
- Jussi Kinnunen -- bass, vocals
- Marko Timonen -- drums, percussion
- Anna-Mari Kähärä -- backing vocals
- Mia Simanainen—backing vocals
- Ona Kamu—backing vocals
- Riikka Väyrynen—backing vocals
- Säde Rissanen—backing vocals
