= L'amourha =

Studio album by Sielun Veljet
- Released: 1985
- Genre: Alternative rock
- Length: 49:01
- Label: EMI, Poko Rekords
- Producer: T.T. Oksala

Sielun Veljet chronology
Hei soturit (1984)	L'amourha (1985)	Kuka teki huorin (1986)

Professional ratings
Review scores
Source	Rating
Soundi	5/5 stars

L'amourha is the third album of Sielun Veljet. It was their breakthrough album, gaining much of its success from the hit single "Peltirumpu". It is the only Sielun Veljet album to come close to the sales figures of Ismo Alanko's previous group, Hassisen Kone, and remains one of Alanko's most popular works. The album was named the fourth greatest Finnish rock album by Soundi magazine in 2005.

"Peltirumpu" has been covered by Maija Vilkkumaa (on the 2000 re-release of Pitkä ihana leikki) and SubUrban Tribe (on Säkenöivää voimaa - tribuutti Sielun Veljille, 2002).

The name of the album is a portmanteau of the French word "l'amour" (love) and the Finnish word "murha" (murder). The band began later using the name L'amourder, as their alias in English language projects.

== Track listing ==
1. "Peltirumpu" (Alanko) – 3:49
2. "L'Amour" (Alanko, Orma) – 3:59
3. "Tiskirätti" (Alanko, Orma) – 3:57
4. "Ikävä" (Alanko, Orma) – 2:53
5. "Talvi" (Alanko) – 5:21
6. "Toiset on luotuja kulkemaan" (Frederick Loewe, Alan Jay Lerner) – 4:38
7. "Kanoottilaulu" (traditional) – 3:15
8. "On mulla unelma" (Alanko) – 4:14
9. "Josef, Josef" (Sammy Cahn, Nellie Casman, Saul Chaplin, Samuel Steinberg) – 3:13
10. "Satujen julma taikayö" (Alanko) – 4:51
11. "Rakkaus raatelee" (Alanko) – 4:39
12. "Laulu" (Alanko) – 4:12
- "Toiset on luotuja kulkemaan", originally titled "Wand'rin' Star", has Finnish lyrics by Juha Vainio.
- "Josef, Josef", originally titled "Joseph, Joseph", has Finnish lyrics by Kauko Käyhkö.

== Personnel ==
- Ismo Alanko – vocals, guitar, bass
- Jukka Orma – guitar, vocals
- Jouko Hohko – bass, guitar, vocals
- Alf Forsman – drums, percussion
