= Taiteilijaelämää =

Studio album by Ismo Alanko
- Released: 1995
- Genre: Rock
- Length: 58:23
- Label: Poko Rekords
- Producer: Riku Mattila

Ismo Alanko chronology
Jäätyneitä lauluja (1993)	Taiteilijaelämää (1995)	Irti (1996)

Taiteilijaelämää (Finnish for "An Artist's Life") is the third solo album of Ismo Alanko, released in 1995. Alanko later used the same title for his 2006 DVD Taiteilijaelämää vuosilta 1989-2006.

== Track listing ==
Music and lyrics by Ismo Alanko.

1. "Oletko koskaan..." – 5:24
2. "Pelataanko shakkia vai?" – 5:08
3. "Nuorena syntynyt" – 6:12
4. "Kamaan ja tavaraan" – 3:50
5. "Väärään maailmaan" – 4:59
6. "Don Quiote" – 4:54
7. "Kun rakkaus on rikki" – 5:32
8. "Pakko päästä pinnalle" – 3:25
9. "Taiteilijaelämää" – 4:36
10. "Suomi ratsastaa jälleen" – 4:18
11. "Tule mun luojani" – 5:28
12. "Kurjet" – 4:39

== Personnel ==
- Ismo Alanko – vocals, guitar, synthesizer
- Jukka Kiviniemi – bass
- Ippe Kätkä – drums, maracas
- Riku Mattila – guitar, slide guitar, bass
- Safka – organ, electric piano, piano
- Izmo – synthesizer
- Ilkka Alanko – backing vocals
- Ona Kamu – backing vocals
- Sakari Kukkonen – drums, tambourine, backing vocals
- Tommi Lindell – synthesizer
- Pekka Witikka – synthesizer
- Max Savikangas – viola
- Sanna Salmenkallio – violin
