= Harsoinen teräs =

Studio album by Hassisen Kone
- Released: March 1982
- Recorded: January 1982
- Genres: New wave, post-punk, progressive rock, art rock
- Length: 38:36
- Label: Poko Records
- Producer: Hassisen Kone

Hassisen Kone chronology
Rumat sävelet (1981)	Harsoinen teräs (1982)

Professional ratings
Review scores
Source	Rating
Soundi	5/5 stars

Harsoinen teräs is the third and final album of Hassisen Kone, released in 1982. Musically, the album has a progressive twist to it. The songs are more complicated than on the group's two previous albums, and the band's lineup was expanded to seven people for this album, featuring a new guitarist Jukka Orma (who later continued with Ismo Alanko in Sielun Veljet), saxophonist Antti Seppo, keyboardist Safka Pekkonen and percussionist Hannu Porkka.

== Track listing ==
All songs by Alanko.

1. "Harsoinen teräs"—4:40
2. "Kupla kimaltaa"—3:30
3. "Levottomat jalat"—3:04
4. "Totuus"—5:35
5. "Eksyneet lampaat"—2:37
6. "Julkinen eläin"—3:50
7. "Kuollut eläköön"—4:44
8. "Olen toki, vain sen tiedän"—4:15
9. "Pelko"—6:21

=== English edition ===
The track list of an English language edition (which has only vocal tracks redubbed) is slightly different, replacing some tracks with songs from previous releases.

1. High Tension Wire (Harsoinen teräs) —04:51
2. Gold Bricks (Muoviruusuja omenapuissa) —04:00
3. Bubbles in the Stream (Kupla kimaltaa) —03:42
4. Truth (Totuus) —05:33
5. Blood Runs Slow (Hiljaa virtaa veri) —05:19
6. Walking Fever (Levottomat jalat) —03:05
7. Beast in the Window (Julkinen eläin) —03:52
8. Panic (Pelko) —06:57

== Personnel ==
- Ismo Alanko -- vocals
- Jukka Orma -- guitar
- Jussi Kinnunen -- bass, backing vocals
- Safka Pekkonen -- organ, electric piano, piano, backing vocals
- Hannu Porkka -- xylophone, percussion
- Antti Seppo -- saxophone
- Harri Kinnunen -- drums
