= Hei soturit =

Studio album by Sielun Veljet
- Released: 1984
- Recorded: 1983–1984
- Genre: Alternative rock
- Length: 65:30
- Label: Poko Records
- Producer: Sielun Veljet

Sielun Veljet chronology
Sielun Veljet (1983)	Hei soturit (1984)	L'amourha (1985)

Professional ratings
Review scores
Source	Rating
Soundi	4/5 stars

Hei soturit (Finnish for "Hey Warriors") is the second studio album by the Finnish rock group Sielun Veljet. The CD release of the album is titled Hei soturit/Lapset, as it also includes the 1983 EP Lapset (Finnish for "The Children").

"Elintaso" was covered by Finnish rock group Aknestik on the 2002 various artists tribute album Säkenöivää voimaa - tribuutti Sielun Veljille. Ismo Alanko said in an interview that he prefers cover versions that try to find a new perspective to the original, and that the Aknestik version was even confusing because they had transformed the furious song into a ballad. Popeda covered "Aina Nälkä" on the same album.

== Track listing ==
All tracks by Sielun Veljet, except where noted.

1. "Rytmi" (Alanko, Orma, Hohko, Forsman) -- 0:32
2. "Satama" (Alanko) -- 3:57
3. "Aina nälkä" (Alanko) -- 3:02
4. "Hei soturit" (Alanko, Orma) -- 1:41
5. "Ossin jälkeiset" (Hohko, Orma) -- 4:13
6. "Tää on tää" (Alanko, Hohko) -- 2:43
7. "Muistokirjoitus" (Alanko) -- 4:33
8. "Vaanin sua" (Alanko) -- 3:37
9. "Tango skitsofrenia" (Alanko, Orma) -- 2:52
10. "Paljain jaloin" (Alanko, Orma, Hohko, Forsman) -- 2:35
11. "Sielun veljet" (Alanko) -- 3:53
12. "Rauhallista" (Alanko) -- 5:38

== Personnel ==
- Ismo Alanko -- vocals, guitar, bass, piano, cello
- Jukka Orma—guitar, vocals
- Jouko Hohko—bass, guitar, vocals
- Alf Forsman -- drums, percussion
