= Pulu (album) =

Studio album by Ismo Alanko Säätiö
- Released: 1998
- Genre: Alternative rock, Art rock
- Length: 49:33
- Label: Poko Rekords
- Producer: Heikki Savolainen

Ismo Alanko Säätiö chronology
Pulu (1998)	Sisäinen solarium (2000)

Pulu (Finnish for "Pigeon") is the 1998 debut album of Ismo Alanko Säätiö. The newly formed band's sound has influences from Finnish folk music. An important part of the album's sound is reputed accordionist Kimmo Pohjonen. Pulu reached number one on the Finnish album charts.

In "Rakkaus on ruma sana", Alanko criticizes the Finnish word "rakkaus" ("love") for being ugly. The song title can be translated as "Love Is a Bad Word", "Love Is an Ugly Word", or even "Rakkaus Is an Ugly Word". Alanko later used the same title when he released a book of his song lyrics, Rakkaus on ruma sana - valitut laulutekstit (2004).

"Tuulipuvun tuolla puolen" ("Beyond the tracksuit") is a reference to the Finnish tango Satumaa that begins with "Aavan meren tuolla puolen" ("Beyond the wide ocean"). It was also the name of the concert tour that followed the release of Pulu.

== Track listing ==
All songs by Ismo Alanko.

1. "Värityskirja" – 5:07
2. "Päivän uutinen" – 4:24
3. "Rakkaus on ruma sana" – 3:48
4. "Pisaroi" – 6:30
5. "Maalausliike" – 4:04
6. "Tango Yössä" – 4:06
7. "Lihaa ja verta" – 3:09
8. "Vaiennut hiljaisuus" – 6:02
9. "Sairaat" – 3:41
10. "Pulu" – 4:33
11. "Tuulipuvun tuolla puolen" – 4:11

== Personnel ==
- Ismo Alanko – vocals, guitar, piano, cello
- Kimmo Pohjonen – accordion, harmonica, vocals
- Teho Majamäki – vibraphone, marimba, organ, percussion
- Jussi Kinnunen – bass, vocals
- Marko Timonen – drums, percussion
- Kari Kriikku – clarinet (on #1 and #11)
- Jukka Orma – guitar (on #4 and #6)
- Pemo Ojala – trumpet (on #4)
- Sanna Kurki-Suonio – vocals (on #5, #7 and #10)
