= Suomi-Finland =

Studio album by Sielun Veljet
- Released: 1988
- Genre: Alternative rock
- Length: 39:52
- Label: Poko Rekords
- Producer: Riku Mattila

Sielun Veljet chronology
Shit-Hot (1987)	Suomi-Finland (1988)	Softwood Music Under Slow Pillars (1989)

Professional ratings
Review scores
Source	Rating
Soundi	5/5 stars

Suomi-Finland is the sixth studio album of the Finnish rock band Sielun Veljet. It was released in 1988 between two English language albums, Shit-Hot and Softwood Music Under Slow Pillars. Suomi-Finland has a more acoustic sound than earlier Sielun Veljet material, anticipating the psychedelic, all-acoustic Softwood Music Under Slow Pillars.

"Volvot ulvoo kuun savuun" has been covered by industrial metal band Turmion Kätilöt.

== Track listing ==
Music and lyrics by Ismo Alanko except where noted.

1. "Intro"—0:35
2. "Lainsuojaton" (Alanko, Orma) -- 3:10
3. "Suomi-Finland" (Alanko, Orma) -- 3:40
4. "Huuhaa puuhaa" (Sielun Veljet) -- 3:25
5. "Rock'n'Roll"—3:40
6. "Ihminen" (Alanko, Orma) -- 5:31
7. "Totuus vai tequila"—3:35
8. "Sumuista hymyä"—5:30
9. "Alamäkeen" (Sielun Veljet) -- 4:23
10. "Kaisa ja Ben"—3:54
11. "Volvot ulvoo kuun savuun" (Sielun Veljet) -- 3:29

== Personnel ==
- Ismo Alanko -- vocals, guitar
- Jukka Orma—guitar, strings, keyboards, vocals
- Jouko Hohko -- bass, vocals
- Alf Forsman -- drums, percussion
