= Softwood Music Under Slow Pillars =

Studio album by Sielun Veljet
- Released: 1989
- Recorded: 1989
- Genres: Alternative rock, psychedelic rock
- Length: 36:29
- Label: Poko Records
- Producer: Riku Mattila

Sielun Veljet chronology
Suomi-Finland (1988)	Softwood Music Under Slow Pillars (1989)

Professional ratings
Review scores
Source	Rating
Soundi	4/5 stars

Softwood Music Under Slow Pillars (or simply Softwood Music) is the seventh album of Sielun Veljet, released in 1989. It is the band's only English language album released as Sielun Veljet, although it was released in Sweden as L'amourder. The band had already released two English language recordings, the Ritual EP in 1986 and Shit-Hot in 1987, consisting of re-recorded versions of their songs with the lyrics translated to English, but this was the first time that the music was originally written in English.

Sielun Veljet had already been exploring foreign markets and even toured in Europe and the Soviet Union in 1987, but Softwood Music was only released in Finland and Sweden, and even there it sold poorly. It differs from previous Sielun Veljet albums by being acoustic and containing influences from Indian music to flamenco. The album has a generally psychedelic atmosphere.

The album's cover art was painted by Peruvian artist Pablo Amaringo. It depicts a shamanistic ayahuasca healing ritual.

Although the songs were credited to be written by the band, Alanko wrote most of the material "Woe! The Maiden of My Heart" and "Life Is a Cobra" being written by Orma and "Evil Kübl" being a collective song.

== Track listing ==
Music and lyrics by Sielun Veljet.

1. "Mushroom Moon"—3:23
2. "I Wanna Be a Frog"—2:16
3. "Life Is a Cobra"—3:05
4. "Woe! The Maiden of My Heart"—2:19
5. "Immortal Bliss"—2:51
6. "Evil Kübl"—3:38
7. "Vicious Waltz"—2:45
8. "Hey-Ho, Red Banana!"—1:58
9. "The Beast Has Taken Over in My Mind Again"—4:27
10. "Old Masterpiece"—2:02
11. "Kerala"—4:25
12. "Living in a Twisted World"—3:10

== Personnel ==
- Ismo Alanko -- vocals, steel-string guitar, bouzouki, cello, backing vocals
- Jukka Orma -- nylon-string guitar, vocals, backing vocals
- Jouko Hohko -- bass balalaika, vocals, backing vocals
- Alf Forsman -- gongo-drums, big drum, gunguru-klocks & other percussion
- Karri Koivukoski -- viola
- Jaakko Vuornos -- violin
- Salla Salmenkallio -- violin
