= Kun Suomi putos puusta =

Studio album by Ismo Alanko
- Released: 1990
- Genre: Rock
- Label: Seal On Velvet
- Producer: Riku Mattila

Ismo Alanko chronology
Kun Suomi putos puusta (1990)	Jäätyneitä lauluja (1993)

Kun Suomi putos puusta, (Finnish for "When Finland Fell Out Of the Tree") also known as Kun Suomi putos puusta: ääniä vapaan pudotuksen aikakaudelta, is Ismo Alanko’s debut solo album, released in 1990. Originally commissioned for Helsingin Juhlaviikot (Helsinki Festival Week), the album showcases a departure from Alanko's previous work with the band Sielun Veljet (The Soul Brothers).

Unlike the trademark material of Sielun Veljet, Kun Suomi putos puusta explores a more acoustic and minimalist production style. The album incorporates foley-style atmospheric sound effects commonly used in film production, adding a unique touch to the musical direction.

The album achieved considerable success in Finland, selling over 30,000 copies and earning a gold certification in 1999.

== Track listing ==
All songs written by Ismo Alanko.

1. "Kun Suomi putos puusta" – 4:21
2. "Rakas, rämä elämä" – 3:06
3. "Työ" – 1:14
4. "Masentunut ameeba" – 4:57
5. "Valheita ja onnenpekkoja" – 4:01
6. "Alumiinikuu" – 3:14
7. "Meidän isä" – 6:40
8. "Hetki hautausmaalla" – 4:26
9. "Tuupovaara-Helsinki" – 3:40

== Personnel ==
- Ismo Alanko: vocals, guitar, piano, keyboards, percussion, tools, breathing
- Ahti Marja-Aho: bass, piano, violin, maracas, mandolin, harmonium, zither, backing vocals, tools
- Riku Mattila: guitar, maracas, tools
- Keimo Hirvonen: drums
- Kari Lindstedt: cello
- Mauri Pietikäinen: viola
- Heikki Hämäläinen: violin
- Seppo Rautasuo: violin
- Jari Hongisto: trombone
- Matti Riikonen: trumpet
- Jouni Kannisto: saxophone
- Pentti Lahti: saxophone
- Jussi Harju: tuba
- Raoul Björkenheim: bass drum
- Susanna Tollet: vocals
- Satu Kaarisola-Kulo: vocals
- Nina Fågelberg: vocals
- Jari Hyttinen: backing vocals
- Ilkka Alanko: backing vocals
- Pekka Karjalainen: effects
