= Kuka teki huorin =

Studio album by Sielun Veljet
- Released: 1986
- Recorded: 1986
- Genre: Alternative rock
- Length: 37:45
- Label: Poko
- Producer: T. T. Oksala

Sielun Veljet chronology
L'amourha (1985)	Kuka teki huorin (1986)	Shit-Hot (1987)

Kuka teki huorin is the fourth album of Finnish rock band Sielun Veljet. It is written in a style similar to their breakthrough album L'amourha, and the band was criticized by Soundi magazine for repeating itself. The album maintains the fiercely energetic and repetitive style of Sielun Veljet with some funk influences, while at the same time being considered one of their more accessible recordings.

Kuka teki huorin was certified gold in 1995, being one of two Sielun Veljet studio albums to achieve a gold record.

== Reception ==
Professional ratings
Review scores
Source	Rating
Allmusic	4.5/5 stars
Soundi	3/5 stars

== Track listing ==
All songs by Ismo Alanko, except where noted.

1. "Ajá" (Alanko, Orma) -- 1:46
2. "Kuka teki huorin"—4:56
3. "Museossa"—4:34
4. "Säkenöivä voima"—3:00
5. "Kaksin"—4:45
6. "Kansallispäivä" (Alanko, Orma) -- 4:28
7. "Mustamaalaan"—3:12
8. "Kemiaa" (Alanko, Orma) -- 2:27
9. "Joku kuuntelee" (Alanko, Orma) -- 4:01
10. "Kristallilapsia" (Alanko, Orma) -- 4:36

== Personnel ==
- Ismo Alanko -- vocals, guitar, bass, piano
- Jukka Orma—guitar, vocals
- Jouko Hohko -- bass, guitar, vocals
- Alf Forsman -- drums, percussion
