= Jäätyneitä lauluja =

Studio album by Ismo Alanko
- Released: 1993
- Genre: Industrial rock, electronic
- Length: 44:59
- Label: Seal On Velvet
- Producer: Mitro and Ismo Alanko

Ismo Alanko chronology
Kun Suomi putos puusta (1990)	Jäätyneitä lauluja (1993)	Taiteilijaelämää (1995)

Jäätyneitä lauluja (Finnish for "Frozen Songs")is the second solo album by Ismo Alanko, released in 1993. The album has electronic music influence, making heavy use of drum loops and modern studio technology.

Jäätyneitä lauluja is the first Ismo Alanko album that has Alanko's lyrics printed on the album sleeve. Alanko has said that the lyrics were printed on the demand of cover artist Stefan Lindfors.

== Track listing ==
All tracks by Ismo Alanko, except where noted.

1. "Pornografiaa"—5:47
2. "Laboratorion lapset" (Alanko, Mitro) -- 4:58
3. "Kuolemalla on monet kasvot" (Alanko, Izmo) -- 5:22
4. "Extaasiin" (Alanko, Izmo, Mitro, Riku Mattila) -- 4:42
5. "Demokratiaa (mutta vain tietyillä ehdoilla)" (Alanko, Mitro) -- 5:45
6. "Rakkautta ja hölynpölyä"—3:57
7. "Kolme pientä sanaa"—3:54
8. "Autolounas huoltamon tapaan" (Alanko, Mattila) -- 4:52
9. "Miljonäärien yö"—5:02

== Personnel ==
- Ismo Alanko -- vocals, guitar, sequencer
- Ilkka Alanko -- backing vocals
- Veeti—backing vocals
- Anssi Nykänen -- drum loops
- Janne Haavisto—drum loops
- Riku Mattila - guitar
- Izmo -- synthesizer
