= Ruuhkainen Taivas =

Studio album by Ismo Alanko Säätiö
- Released: February 22, 2006
- Genre: Alternative rock
- Length: 42:50
- Label: Poko Rekords

Ismo Alanko Säätiö chronology
Minä ja pojat (2004)	Ruuhkainen Taivas (2006)

Professional ratings
Review scores
Source	Rating
Soundi	link

Ruuhkainen Taivas is the fifth studio album of Ismo Alanko Säätiö. It was released in 2006.

== Track listing ==
1. "Hämärämies" – 4:07
2. "Surun murtama" – 4:08
3. "Paskiainen" – 2:52
4. "Miksi arki näyttää tältä" – 3:17
5. "2.45" – 3:48
6. "Liitto" – 4:58
7. "Ruuhkainen Taivas" – 1:22
8. "Ilman seuraa" – 2:29
9. "Savolainen Tiibetissä" – 3:20
10. "Rakkauden saituri" – 3:28
11. "Haaveiden sillan alla" – 4:43
12. "Kun vapaus koittaa" – 4:12

== Personnel ==
- Ismo Alanko – vocals, guitar, keyboards, percussion
- Jarno Karjalainen – bass, vocals, percussion
- Timo Kämäräinen – guitar, steel guitar, piano, vocals, percussion
- Riku Mattila – guitar
- Marko Timonen – drums, percussion
