= Ottopasuuna (album) =

Studio album by Ottopasuuna
- Released: 1991
- Recorded: 1991
- Studio: SBC Studios, Kouvola, Finland
- Genre: Folk
- Length: 50:57
- Label: Texicalli

Professional ratings
Review scores
Source	Rating
AllMusic	4.5/5 stars
Chicago Tribune	3.5/4 stars

Ottopasuuna is the eponymous debut album by Finnish folk ensemble Ottopasuuna, released in 1991. The influences for the songs range from Irish folk music to that of Eastern Europe, but is underlined by a Scandinavian touch.

== Track listing ==
No.	Title	Music	Length
1.	"Tsizikpolkka"	Traditional	3:42
2.	"Kalmukkisottiisi"	Kimmo Pohjonen	3:16
3.	"Kolmospolska"	Kurt Lindblad; Kimmo Pohjonen; Kari Reiman	2:48
4.	"In Dulci Jubilo"	Traditional	2:35
5.	"Hippavalta"	Traditional	3:00
6.	"Kiisken Polska"	Kari Reiman	2:57
7.	"Varpunen"	Traditional	2:54
8.	"Tyyskä"	Traditional	2:59
9.	"Polska"	Kurt Lindblad	2:33
10.	"Viialan Vanhaa Kansaa"	Kimmo Pohjonen	2:39
11.	"Honkolan Mamman Kirnumasurkka"	Kimmo Pohjonen	2:39
12.	"Oira"	Traditional	2:57
13.	"Limperin Polska"	Traditional	2:47
14.	"Vibergin Masurkka"	Traditional	3:17
15.	"Sudenrita"	Traditional	3:07
16.	"Lukkarin Valssi"	Traditional	2:36
17.	"Havulintu"	Kari Reiman	4:11
Total length:			50:57

== Personnel ==
- Petri Hakala – guitar, mandocello, mandolin
- Kurt Lindblad – clarinet, composer, flute, whistle
- Kimmo Pohjonen – harmonica, marimba, melodion
- Kari Reiman – composer, fiddle
