= Onnenpyörä =

Studio album by Sielun Veljet
- Released: 1988
- Genre: Alternative rock, punk rock
- Length: 24:19
- Label: Seal On Velvet

Onnenpyörä (Finnish for "Wheel of Fortune") is a live cover album by Sielun Veljet under four different aliases, released in 1988.

== Track listing ==
1. Leputation of the Slaves: "It's My Life" (Carl D'Errico, Roger Atkins) -- 3:41
2. Pimpline & The Defenites: "Shimmy Shimmy Kokobop" (Bob Smith) -- 2:54
3. Kullervo Kivi & Gehenna-yhtye: "Kolmatta linjaa takaisin" (orig. "Beautiful in the Rain) (Tony Hatch, Jackie Trent, Finnish lyrics by Juha Vainio) -- 2:36
4. Adolf und die Freie Scheisse: "Springtime for Hitler" (Mel Brooks) -- 2:35
5. Leputation of the Slaves: "Speak Up Mambo" (Al Castellanos) -- 3:55
6. Kullervo Kivi & Gehenna-yhtye: "Seinillä on korvat" (orig. "Walls Have Ears") (Roy C. Bennett, Sid Tepper, Finnish lyrics by Saukki) -- 2:38
7. Leputation of the Slaves: "Riders on the Storm" (Jim Morrison, Robby Krieger, Ray Manzarek, John Densmore) -- 2:38
8. Pimpline & The Defenites: "All I Have to Do Is Dream" (Boudleaux Bryant) -- 3:22

== Personnel ==
- Ismo Alanko -- vocals, guitar
- Jukka Orma—guitar
- Jouko Hohko -- bass
- Alf Forsman -- drums
