= Minä ja pojat =

Studio album by Ismo Alanko Säätiö
- Released: August 13, 2004
- Genre: Alternative rock
- Length: 41:02
- Label: Poko Rekords
- Producer: Jussi Jaakonaho

Ismo Alanko Säätiö chronology
Hallanvaara (2002)	Minä ja pojat (2004)	Ruuhkainen Taivas (2006)

Professional ratings
Review scores
Source	Rating
Soundi	link

Minä ja pojat is the fourth album by Finnish rock group Ismo Alanko Säätiö, released in 2004.

== Track listing ==
Music and lyrics by Ismo Alanko, unless where noted.

1. "Lumous katoaa" (Karjalainen) -- 3:50
2. "Rakkaus hallitsee"—3:44
3. "Silloin kun taivas vielä auttoi meitä"—3:47
4. "Ruuvaa, väännä, säädä, hinkkaa"—3:46
5. "Pentti"—3:47
6. "Isä ja lapsi"—3:53
7. "Joensuu" (Alanko, Kämäräinen, Karjalainen) -- 5:03
8. "Liikaa"—3:28
9. "Pakko tehdä duunii"—3:44
10. "Minä ja pojat"—2:43
11. "Kaikki raitistuu"—3:17

== Personnel ==
- Riku Mattila—guitar
- Ismo Alanko -- vocals, guitar
- Marko Timonen -- drums, percussion
- Jarno Karjalainen -- bass, vocals
- Timo Kämäräinen—guitar, vocals
