= Rumat sävelet =

Studio album by Hassisen Kone
- Released: July 1981
- Recorded: October 1980 – May 1981
- Genre: New wave, punk rock, post-punk
- Label: Poko Records
- Producer: Pantse Syrjä

Hassisen Kone chronology
Täältä tullaan Venäjä (1980)	Rumat sävelet (1981)	Harsoinen teräs (1982)

Professional ratings
Review scores
Source	Rating
Soundi	4/5 stars

Rumat sävelet (Finnish for "The Ugly Tunes") is the second album of Finnish rock band Hassisen Kone. It was a successful follow-up to the group's debut Täältä tullaan Venäjä, and was certified platinum in 2005.

Ismo Alanko has said that the album's lyrics partly reflected how he experienced the sudden success of their debut album. This is most evident in the song "Jurot nuorisojulkkikset" ("Surly Youth Celebrities"). Hassisen Kone played the song in 2000 at a reunion concert, even though Alanko thought it was strange singing the song as a 40-year-old.

In 2005 the critics of Soundi rock magazine chose the album to be the fifth greatest Finnish popular music album.

== Track listing ==
All tracks written by Ismo Alanko.

1. "Oikeus on voittanut taas"—3:12
2. "Führerin puolesta"—3:22
3. "Jurot nuorisojulkkikset"—3:27
4. "Uhrisavua"—3:15
5. "Jeesus tulee"—2:30
6. "Tuomiopäivä tulee"—4:32
7. "Odotat?!"—3:15
8. "Rajat"—4:15
9. "Tällä tiellä"—3:14
10. "Pelkurit"—2:28
11. "Hyvä olla"—4:12

== Personnel ==
- Ismo Alanko -- vocals, guitar, keyboards, cello
- Reijo Heiskanen—guitar, backing vocals
- Jussi Kinnunen -- bass, backing vocals
- Harri Kinnunen -- drums
