= Täältä tullaan Venäjä =

Studio album by Hassisen Kone
- Released: August 1980
- Recorded: June 1980
- Genre: New wave, punk rock
- Length: 35:28
- Label: Poko Records
- Producer: Pantse Syrjä

Hassisen Kone chronology
Täältä tullaan Venäjä (1980)	Rumat sävelet (1981)

Professional ratings
Review scores
Source	Rating
Soundi	3/5 stars

Täältä tullaan Venäjä (Finnish for "Russia Here We Come") is the debut album of Hassisen Kone. It was released in 1980, shortly after the newly formed band had won the Finnish Rock championship. The outspoken lyrics of the opening track "Rappiolla" shocked, among others, Yleisradio reporters Anneli Tempakka and Maija Dahlgren, who started protesting against indecency in rock lyrics. In response to this, the band humorously dedicated their 1981 Christmas song "On jouluyö, nyt laulaa saa" to the reporters. "Rappiolla" became one of Hassisen Kone's biggest hits.

Täältä tullaan Venäjä was produced by Eppu Normaali guitarist Pantse Syrjä. Eppu Normaali's 1979 album Maximum Jee&Jee had originally influenced Ismo Alanko to form Hassisen Kone.

The album was a huge success in Finland, and it was certified platinum in 1997.

== Track listing ==
Music by Hassisen Kone, except where noted. All Lyrics by Alanko.

1. "Rappiolla"—3:03
2. "Jumalat jalassa" (Alanko) - 2:45
3. "Reippaat ja lahjakkaat laulajaveikot"—2:07
4. "Täältä tullaan Venäjä" (Alanko, Jussi Kinnunen) -- 2:16
5. "Kulkurin iltakalja"—2:40
6. "Reippaina käymme rekkain alle" (Alanko) -- 2:41
7. "Syöksylaskijoita kaikki tyynni"—2:10
8. "Rock ehkäisyvälineitä vastaan"—2:45
9. "Älä syö liisteriä"—2:46
10. "Iloisesti Hammondilla" (Alanko) -- 2:22
11. "Hassisen Kone" (Alanko) -- 2:34
12. "Syytön" (Alanko) -- 2:24
13. "Viimeinen rock ennen aivokuolemaa" (Alanko) -- 4:55

== Personnel ==
- Ismo Alanko – vocals, guitar
- Reijo Heiskanen – guitar
- Jussi Kinnunen – bass
- Harri Kinnunen – drums
