= Shit-Hot =

Studio album by L'amourder
- Released: 1987
- Genre: Alternative rock
- Length: 38:06
- Label: Poko Records

L'amourder chronology
Kuka teki huorin (1986)	Shit-Hot (1987)	Suomi-Finland (1988)

Shit-Hot is an album by L'amourder, a pseudonym for Sielun Veljet. It contains re-recorded versions of their songs translated into English.

== Track listing ==
1. Forever hungry (= Aina nälkä)
2. Luminous force (= Säkenöivä voima).
3. Love on the edge (= Rakkaudesta)
4. I got mine (= Tää on tää)
5. Misery (= Ikävä)
6. Shit-hot (= Aja!).
7. Bitches brew (= Kuka teki huorin)
8. Emil Zatopek
9. Do the twitch (= Nyt nykii).
10. Song, A (= Laulu).
11. City of smiling snakes (= Lainsuojaton)
12. Nazional day (= Kansallispäivä)

== Track listing (v.2) ==
1. City Of Smiling Snakes—03:28
2. Do The Twitch—02:28
3. Emil Zatopek—02:42
4. I Got Mine—02:46
5. Nazional Day—04:03
6. Bitches Brew—04:21
7. Love On The Edge—04:25
8. Luminous Force—02:37
9. Forever Hungry—03:07
10. Shit-Hot—01:55
11. Misery—02:57
12. A Song—03:51

== Personnel ==
- Ismo Alanko – vocals, guitar
- Jukka Orma—guitar, vocals
- Jouko Hohko – bass, vocals
- Alf Forsman – drums, percussion
