= Ottopasuuna =

Defunct Finnish folk music ensemble

- Origin: Helsinki, Finland
- Genres: Folk music
- Years active: 1990s
- Labels: Texicalli, Xenophile
- Past members: Petri Hakala; Kurt Lindblad; Kimmo Pohjonen; Kari Reiman

Ottopasuuna was a Finnish folk music ensemble that mixed their country's traditional music with forms from elsewhere in Europe, played with unconventional instruments.

== History ==
Ottopasuuna was formed in the early 1990s by Petri Hakala (mandolin, octave mandolin, guitar, fiddle), Kurt Lindblad (flute, bagpipe), Kimmo Pohjonen (accordion), and Kari Reiman (fiddle; also a member of Värttinä). By 1994, Lindblad had been replaced by Kristiina Ilmonen (whistles, flute, Irish flute) and Janne Lappalainen (bass clarinet, bazouki). Many of the band members were previously part of Finland's Sibelius Academy.

The band is primarily associated with contemporary Finnish folk music and its influences include "the Finno-Ugrian world (...) dance tunes and melodies from Estonia, Ingria, Ostrobothnia (...) and Karelia." Hakala, in particular, has been recognized for his ability to master multiple instruments and is described as "one of the finest players around" in folk and rock traditions of Finland.

In 1991, Ottopasuuna released a critically acclaimed self-titled album through Green Linnet Records. It was the first Finnish folk album to be released internationally.

== Discography ==
- Ottopasuuna (1991)
- Suokaasua (1996)

== Members ==
- Petri Hakala – guitar, mandocello, mandolin
- Kurt Lindblad – clarinet, flute, whistle
- Kimmo Pohjonen – harmonica, marimba, melodion
- Kari Reiman – fiddle
