= Irti =

Studio album by Ismo Alanko
- Released: 1996
- Genre: Alternative rock
- Length: 49:13
- Label: Poko
- Producer: Riku Mattila

Ismo Alanko chronology
| Taiteilijaelämää (1995) | Irti (1996) |

Irti (Finnish for "Off" or "Loose") is the fourth solo album of Ismo Alanko, released in 1996. According to Alanko, he and his band gave themselves two weeks time to compose and record the album from scratch. The result is an improvisation-based, more freely-played album than the preceding Taiteilijaelämää. Albums cover art is by Stefan Lindfors.

== Track listing ==
Music and lyrics by Ismo Alanko.

1. "Piste"—5:04
2. "Kriisistä kriisiin"—5:28
3. "Elämä on hauras"—5:18
4. "Häpeä ja kateus"—2:57
5. "Aika kuolla"—6:33
6. "Mitä se mulle kuuluu mitä mä teen"—5:12
7. "Rakkauden tila"—3:47
8. "Rokin kreivi"—3:19
9. "Miespaholainen"—3:50
10. "Lokki"—3:57
11. "Lasten laulu"—3:50

== Personnel ==
- Ismo Alanko -- vocals, guitar, cello
- Jouko Hohko -- bass, vocals
- Ismo "Ippe" Kätkä -- drums, percussion
- Riku Mattila—guitar
- Teho Majamäki -- marimba, vibraphone, keyboards, percussion
- Ismo "Izmo" Heikkilä -- synthesizer
