= Musta laatikko =

Box set by Sielun Veljet
- Released: 1991
- Recorded: 1990–1991
- Genre: Alternative rock
- Label: Poko

Musta laatikko (Finnish for Black Box) is a box set by Sielun Veljet, released in 1991. The first one of its three CDs contains material that was supposed to become a studio album before the band broke up. The second CD is for the most part unreleased live material, and the third disc is a live performance by Kullervo Kivi & Gehenna-yhtye at Vanha Ylioppilastalo in Helsinki, March 1990.

Kullervo Kivi & Gehenna-yhtye is one of many aliases for Sielun Veljet. Under this one they play old schlager songs.

== Track listing ==
=== CD 1 (Sielun Veljet: Muistinmenetys) ===
1. "Valssi, osa 1" (Alanko)
2. "Uskontunnustus" (Orma)
3. "Laatikoita" (Alanko, Orma)
4. "Kovaa peliä rakkaudessa" (Orma)
5. "Taloustiistai" (Alanko, Orma)
6. "Valssi, osa 2" (Alanko)
7. "Intro"
8. "Pilvilinna" (Orma)
9. "Onnellinen päivä" (Alanko, Orma)
10. "Päänahka (Buka Aat)" (Alanko)
11. "Valssi, osa 3" (Alanko)
12. "Ajá!" (Alanko, Orma)
13. "Laatikoita remix" (Alanko, Orma)
14. "Uskontunnustus, osa 2" (Orma)
15. "Yhteisö" (Alanko)
16. "Valssi, osa 4" (Alanko)

=== CD 2 (Sielun Veljet: Taudinkuva) ===
1. "Oi mutsi mutsi" (Tuomari Nurmio, lyrics traditional)
2. "Kristallilapsia" (Alanko, Orma)
3. "Lagu-lagu pop" (Alanko, Orma)
4. "Emil Zatopek" (Alanko, Hohko, Orma)
5. "Hyvästi kotimaa" (Nurmio)
6. "Evil Kübl" (Sielun Veljet)
7. "Kurja matkamies maan" (Nurmio, Wilhelmi Malmivaara)
8. "Peltoniemen hintriikan surumarssi" (traditional, lyrics by Reino Helismaa)
9. "Huda huda" (Nurmio)
10. "Haista vittu" (Sielun Veljet)
11. "Ossin jälkeiset" (Hohko, Orma)
12. "Älä itke Iines" (Nurmio)
13. "Sumuista hymyä" (Alanko)
14. "Väkivalta ja päihdeongelma" (Pelle Miljoona)
15. "Crimson and Clover" (Tommy James, Peter Lucia Jr.)

=== CD 3 (Kullervo Kivi & Gehenna-yhtye: Isältä pojalle) ===
1. "Alkusoitto ja esipuhe" (Jyrki Heikko)
2. "Lapin tango" (Unto Mononen, Maija-Liisa Könönen)
3. "Tulenliekki" (Toivo Kärki, Helismaa)
4. "Vippaa mulle viitonen" (Jay Gorner, Edgar Harburg, Finnish lyrics by Vexi Salmi)
5. "Mustalaisviulu" (John P. Powell, Tibsen Al Merle, Finnish lyrics by Aune Haarla)
6. "Aaveratsastajat" (Stan Jones, Finnish lyrics by Tapio Lehtinen)
7. "Kolmatta linjaa takaisin" (Tony Hatch, Jackie Trent, Finnish lyrics by Juha Vainio)
8. "Enempää en kerro" (Kärki, Salmi)
9. "Seinillä on korvat" (Roy C. Bennett, Sid Tepper, Finnish lyrics by Saukki)
10. "Yksinäinen" (Reijo Lumisalmi)
11. "Lasinen elämä" (Jari Hyttinen, Liikka Vaikkee)
12. "Varas syömmein oot" (Hyttinen, Vaikkee)
13. "Josef, Josef" (Sammy Cahn, Nellie Casman, Saul Chaplin, Samuel Steinberg, Finnish lyrics by Kauko Käyhkö)
14. "Korttipakka" (Jaakko Salo, Seppo Virtanen)
15. "Istanbul" (Jimmy Kennedy, Nat Simon, Finnish lyrics by Lehtinen)
16. "Valkovuokot" (Kaarlo Valkama, Usko Kemppi)
17. "Kulkurin iltatähti" (Kärki, Helismaa)
18. "Päivänsäde ja menninkäinen" (Helismaa)
19. "Toiset on luotuja kulkemaan" (Frederick Loewe, Alan Jay Lerner, Finnish lyrics by Vainio)
