= Samuli Laiho =

Finnish guitarist

Samuli Laiho (born 1969 in Tampere) is a Finnish guitarist, songwriter, composer and author. He was a member of the band Hearthill in the late 1980s.

Laiho’s first novel ”Topliner” ”LIKE-kustannus”, was published in 2018. It is a story of a jazzpianist, who struggles to survive in tough music-business.

In his second book ”Lasiseinä”, (LIKE-kustannus), Laiho walks the reader to his childhood in Helsinki suburb, his single mothers alcoholism and early death.

it is also a story of facing the past and healing.

In 2021 a thriller ”Sielun Palomies” (LIKE-kustannus) was published. It started a series of thrillers called ”Deadly Sins”.

== Biography ==
He started playing guitar at the age of 6. After classical studies, he got his first electric guitar at the age of 12. When he was seventeen, he made his first album with an alternative band called Hearthill in 1988. The band made five albums, played five 500 gigs around Europe, and toured the United States twice.

The band split up in 1993, and Laiho began studying composition. He earned his living by composing musicals and music for the theater. He obtained a master of arts degree from the Finnish Theatre Academy composing and conductor class in 1998.

Samuli moved back to pop music in 2001. He wrote five songs for singer Samuli Edelmann. The album on which they were included sold Platinum, and the first single was a number one airplay hit in Finland. He wrote several other number one songs, with gold status in Finland. In 2002 he wrote the music for the film The Handcuff King, and in 2007 for the television program Jungle of Dreams. He was signed to Warner Chappell Scandinavia in 2008.

Samuli started a collaboration with DJ Slow in 2009. He has since written and produced material with him for television, movies, commercials, and popular music. In the first half of 2011, he will premiere two feature film scores written with DJ Slow, VARES Pahan suudelma and VARES Huhtikuun Tytöt.

== Discography ==
- Sido Mut Suhun / Keikari, Sonet, PolyGram Finland Oy, SOPOSD 235, SOPOSD 235, CD, Maxi-Single, 1994
