= Hassisen Kone =

Finnish rock band

- Origin: Joensuu, Finland
- Genres: New wave, punk rock
- Years active: 1979–1982, 2001
- Labels: Poko Records
- Past members: Ismo Alanko; Reijo Heiskanen; Jussi Kinnunen; Harri Kinnunen; Jukka Orma; Safka Pekkonen; Hannu Porkka; Antti Seppo
- Website: poko.fi/hassisenkone/

Hassisen Kone was a Finnish rock band, founded in 1979 in Joensuu. The young musicians rose to popularity in 1980 after winning the Finnish rock championship in the new wave category. They recorded three highly successful albums before disbanding in 1982. The singer-songwriter Ismo Alanko has led several bands since then and continues to be an influential name in Finnish rock music.

== History ==
The idea of forming Hassisen Kone came to Ismo Alanko in 1979, when he heard the Eppu Normaali album Maximum Jee&Jee while working in Stockholm. Alanko returned to Finland and started the band with guitarist Reijo Heiskanen and drummer Harri Kinnunen. The band's name was based on a local home appliance store of the same name. The three men had earlier played together in a progressive rock group called Sight. Kinnunen's little brother Jussi was hired to play the bass.

In March 1980, the newly formed Hassisen Kone won the Finnish rock championship, an annual competition for young musicians held since 1970. The victory raised public interest for the band, and when their debut album Täältä tullaan Venäjä was released in June, it was an instant hit. The ironic lyrics of the song "Rappiolla" caused some reporters to start complaining about indecency in rock songs.

The band's follow-up album Rumat sävelet (1981) was considered a more serious and mature record than its predecessor. The album's harsh and sometimes personal lyrics reflected how the sudden rise to stardom had effected the then 20-year-old Alanko. The same year Hassisen Kone took part on the Tuuliajolla tour on Saimaa, with Juice Leskinen and Eppu Normaali. Material of the tour was included in the Kaurismäki brothers film The Saimaa Gesture.

For Harsoinen teräs (1982), Jukka Orma replaced Reijo Heiskanen on guitar and some additional members were hired to work on the more rhythmic and progressive album featuring saxophone, xylophone and keyboards. The classical and prog background of Alanko was more and more evident in the songwriting. Harsoinen teräs was also translated into English and released as a promo album called High Tension Wire in 1982.

Hassisen Kone disbanded in August 1982. Alanko and Orma went on to form Sielun Veljet shortly afterwards. Jussi Kinnunen had a six-month break from music, after which he has played in several bands, including Tiina Tiikeri, Pertti Neumann's band and Ismo Alanko Säätiö. Harri Kinnunen has played, among others, for Sleepy Sleepers and Lapinlahden Linnut.

Hassisen Kone has played several nostalgic reunion concerts after they disbanded. In 2000, they reunited for a concert on midsummer at the Joensuu Laulurinne. The concert was filmed and released as a DVD titled 20 vuotta myöhemmin (20 years later).

== Discography ==
=== Studio albums ===
Released	Title	Chart Peak	Certification	Label
1980	Täältä tullaan Venäjä	-	Platinum (1997)	Poko
1981	Rumat sävelet	-	Platinum (2005)	Poko
1982	Harsoinen teräs	-	Gold (1982)	Poko
1982	High Tension Wire (English language promo LP)	-	–	Poko

=== Compilations ===
Released	Title	Chart Peak	Certification	Label
1982	Historia 1980–1982	-	–	Poko
1987	Poko-klassikko	-	–	Poko
2000	Tarjolla tänään	1	Gold (2000)	Poko
2009	Jurot nuorisojulkkikset	-	–	

=== DVDs ===
Released	Title	Label
2001	20 vuotta myöhemmin	Poko

=== Singles ===
Released	Title	Label
1980	"Hassisen Kone"	Hilse
1980	"Muoviruusuja omenapuissa"	Poko
1980	"Rappiolla"	Poko
1980	"Kolumpia orkesteri"	Poko
1981	"Jurot nuorisojulkkikset"	Poko
1981	"On jouluyö, nyt laulaa saa"	Poko
1981	"Pelkurit"	Poko
1981	"Rajat"	Poko
1982	"Levottomat jalat"	Poko
1982	"Hiljaa virtaa veri"	Poko

== See also ==
- Sielun Veljet
