= Kaurismäki =

Kaurismäki is a Finnish surname The name 'wikt:kauris' + wikt:mäki literally means "deer hill". Notable people with the surname include:

- Aki Kaurismäki (born 1957), Finnish film director and screenwriter, brother of Mika
- Juha Kaunismäki (born 1979), Norwegian hockey player
- Mika Kaurismäki (born 1955), Finnish film director
