= Sielun Veljet =

Finnish rock band

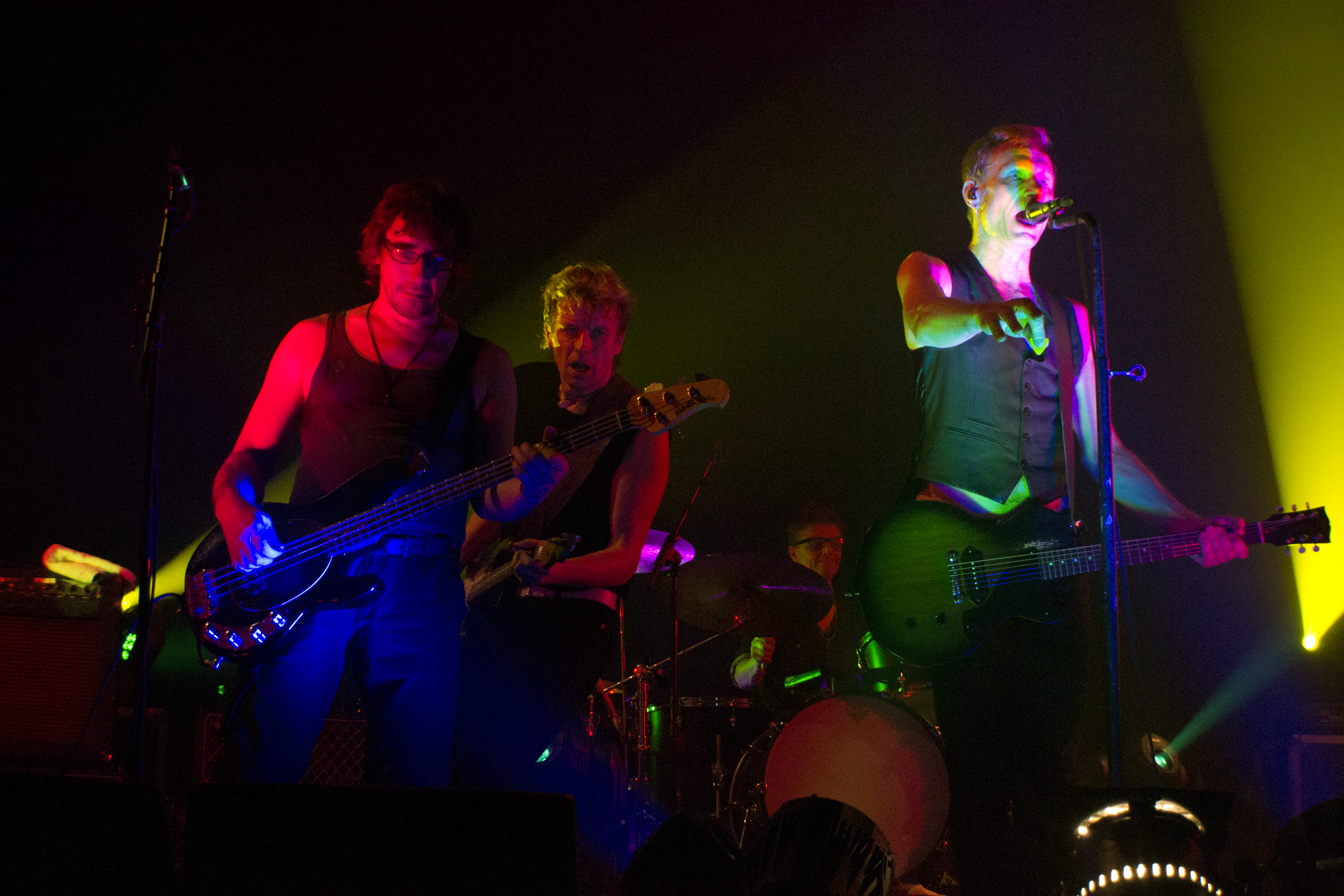
- Sielun Veljet at Teatria in 2011. From left to right: Jouko Hohko, Jukka Orma, Alf Forsman, Ismo Alanko. Lighting design: Vinski Viholainen

Background information
- Also known as: L'amourder; Kullervo Kivi & Gehenna-yhtye; Leputation of the Slaves; Pimpline & the Defenites; Adolf und die Freie Scheisse
- Origin: Finland
- Genres: Alternative rock, post-punk
- Years active: 1983–1992, 2011
- Label: Poko
- Past members: Ismo Alanko; Jukka Orma; Jouko Hohko; Alf Forsman; Hannu Viholainen
- Website: sielunveljet.com

Sielun Veljet (Finnish pronunciation: [ˈsie̯lun ˈʋeljet]) was a Finnish rock band of the 1980s. They were formed soon after the disbanding of Hassisen Kone by its former frontman Ismo Alanko. Sielun Veljet never achieved the fame or the record sales figures of Hassisen Kone, but they became famous for their powerful stage presence and aggressive, shamanistic post-punk musical style. Most of the band's recorded material is sung in Finnish, except for their 1989 album Softwood Music Under Slow Pillars. They have also recorded English-language versions of their songs under the moniker L'amourder. In 2011, they released a new song, "Nukkuva hirviö" (Sleeping beast).

== History ==
=== Early history ===
Sielun Veljet was formed shortly after Hassisen Kone, a successful and well-known new wave band, disbanded. Singer-guitarist Alanko and guitarist Jukka Orma wanted to start making a totally different kind of music than what Hassisen Kone had done and what the Finnish public expected of them. The band was complete with bassist Jouko Hohko and drummer Alf Forsman.

The band's live performances were loud, energetic and extremely intensive from the beginning, and people soon stopped expecting another Hassisen Kone. The concerts were sometimes extremely long—one gig in Nivala in the 1980s lasted for four and a half hours and ended only when security personnel forced Alanko off the stage.

The band's self-titled debut album was recorded live in 1983. Shortly thereafter, with the 1983 EP Lapset and the 1984 album Hei soturit, the band started slowly gaining popularity. The two recordings were joined together on later releases.

=== Breakthrough ===
L'amourha (1985) became the critical and commercial breakthrough for Sielun Veljet, and remains by far their highest selling album. "Peltirumpu" became the band's first real hit. The album and its follow-up Kuka teki huorin (1986) are considered the most accessible Sielun Veljet recordings, and remain the band's only studio album gold records. The song "On Mulla Unelma" (I have a dream) from L'Amourha album was banned by Finnish national broadcasting company, YLE, after it was performed by the band in the Härmärock television show that was broadcast on independence day. The song's lyrics blaspheme Finnish national symbols.

After Kuka teki huorin, Sielun Veljet started re-recording some of their material in English to find an audience outside Finland. They recorded an EP Ritual (1986) and the album Shit-Hot (1987) using the alias L'amourder. The name is a direct translation of the name of their most successful album – "murha" means "murder" in Finnish. A tour in Europe followed, and the band was even allowed to tour in Soviet Russia, which proved to be a success.

Suomi-Finland (1988), recorded in Finnish, saw Sielun Veljet moving into a more acoustic sound than before. The album's lyrics concentrated on the issues present in late 1980s Finland, such as the growing influence of American culture. It was followed by all-acoustic Softwood Music Under Slow Pillars (1989), written in English but not released outside Finland.

=== Breakup ===
After the commercial failure of Softwood Music, the band decided to quit. A greatest hits collection Myytävänä! was released the same year, followed by a three-CD box set Musta laatikko in 1991. Musta laatikko included some rarely heard live and studio material, as well as a full live set under the alias Kullervo Kivi & Gehenna. A documentary film titled Veljet was also released in 1991.

In 2007, Jukka Orma mixed together some Tuomari Nurmio covers the band had recorded in 1990, some of which had been included on Musta laatikko. The album was released as Otteita Tuomari Nurmion laulukirjasta, and it reached No. 1 on the Finnish album charts, highest position ever for Sielun Veljet.

== Influence ==
Sielun Veljet has influenced several Finnish rock and metal bands, such as Maj Karma and Turmion Kätilöt. Turmion Kätilöt have covered the Sielun Veljet song "Volvot ulvoo kuun savuun" on their "Verta ja lihaa" single. A tribute album to them, titled Säkenöivää voimaa – tribuutti Sielun Veljille, was released in 2002 and featured among others Timo Rautiainen & Trio Niskalaukaus, Maija Vilkkumaa (who has also recorded a cover of "Peltirumpu") and Neljä Ruusua.

== Discography ==
=== Studio albums ===
| Released | Title | Performer | Chart Peak | Certification | Label |
|---|---|---|---|---|---|
| 1983 | Lapset (EP) | Sielun Veljet | - | – | Poko |
| 1984 | Hei soturit | Sielun Veljet | - | – | Poko |
| 1985 | L'amourha | Sielun Veljet | - | Gold (1986) | Poko |
| 1986 | Kuka teki huorin | Sielun Veljet | - | Gold (1995) | Poko |
| 1986 | Ritual (MAFTER 3) (EP) | L'amourder | - | – | Poko |
| 1986 | Shit-Hot | L'amourder | - | – | Poko |
| 1988 | Suomi-Finland | Sielun Veljet | - | – | Poko |
| 1989 | Softwood Music Under Slow Pillars | Sielun Veljet | - | – | Poko |
| 1991 | Musta laatikko: CD 1: Muistinmenetys; CD 2: Taudinkuva; CD 3: Isältä pojalle | Sielun Veljet; Sielun Veljet; Kullervo Kivi & Gehenna-yhtye | 29 (2018) | – | Poko |
| 2007 | Otteita Tuomari Nurmion laulukirjasta | Sielun Veljet | 1 | – | Poko |

=== Live albums ===
| Released | Title | Performer | Chart Peak | Certification | Label |
|---|---|---|---|---|---|
| 1983 | Sielun Veljet | Sielun Veljet | - | – | Poko |
| 1988 | Onnenpyörä | Leputation of the Slaves; Pimpline & The Defenites; Kullervo Kivi & Gehenna-yhtye; Adolf und die Freie Scheisse | - | – | Seal on Velvet |
| 1989 | Fuck Women, Let's Dance - Live in der Grouppentheater | Pimpline und the Defenites (Sielun Veljet without Alanko) | - | – | Seal on Velvet |

=== Compilations ===
| Released | Title | Performer | Chart Peak | Certification | Label |
|---|---|---|---|---|---|
| 1989 | Myytävänä! | Sielun Veljet | - | – | Poko |
| 2003 | Aina nälkä – Veljien 20 pahinta hittiä | Sielun Veljet | 16 | Gold (2006) | Poko |

=== DVDs ===
| Released | Title | Performer | Certification | Label |
|---|---|---|---|---|
| 2002 | Sielun Veljet DVD | Sielun Veljet | – | Poko |

=== Singles ===
| Released | Title | Performer | Label |
|---|---|---|---|
| 1983 | "Emil Zatopek" | Sielun Veljet | Poko |
| 1985 | "Toiset on luotuja kulkemaan" | Sielun Veljet | Poko |
| 1985 | "Peltirumpu" | Sielun Veljet | Poko |
| 1986 | "Kevät" | | Poko |
| 1986 | "I Will Stay" | The Leputation of the Slaves | Poko |
| 1986 | "Tin Drum" | L'amourder | Poko |
| 1986 | "Museossa" | Sielun Veljet | Poko |
| 1987 | "Rakkaudesta" | Sielun Veljet | Poko |
| 1988 | "Ihminen" | Sielun Veljet | Poko |
| 1989 | "Meidän äiti imppaa" | Pate & Sielun Veljet | Poko |
| 1991 | "Laatikoita" | Sielun Veljet | Poko |
| 1992 | "Säkenöivä voima" | Sielun Veljet | Poko |
| 2011 | "Nukkuva hirviö" | Sielun Veljet | Poko |
