= Raptori =

Finnish rap group

- Origin: Hyvinkää, Finland
- Genres: Hip hop
- Years active: 1989–1992, 1999–2001, 2010–2011, 2017–2018 , 2025 -->
- Labels: Megamania; Reel Art 2000
- Spinoffs: Allekirjoittanut
- Members: Juho Samuli Peltomaa (JuFo III); Ismo Tapio Heikkilä (Izmo); Tero Tapio Kaikkonen (Kaivo)

Raptori is a Finnish rap group, formed in 1989 in Hyvinkää. They are pioneers of Finnish rap music.

Raptori are aggressive and humoristic at once, often using counter-intuitive rhymes. During the last years of the 1990s dozens of new Finnish rap groups appeared but Raptori was among the first. Raptori's first album, Moe!, was highly successful, selling over 80 000 copies and yielding a number one single (on the Finnish chart) "Oi Beibi". After their second album Raptori broke up (or at least left the scene) they came back in 2000 and released their third album. The band made yet another comeback in 2010 and released a new compilation album Sekoelma which included one new song and two remixes of old songs.

In the mid-1990s, Ismo Tapio Heikkilä and Juho Peltomaa formed a band called Allekirjoittanut with Tommi Lindell. They have released one album, Generation Å. A fellow Raptori member, Tero Tapio Kaikkonen, also appeared on that release.

== Members ==
- Juho Samuli Peltomaa (JuFo III)
- Ismo Tapio Heikkilä (Izmo)
- Tero Tapio Kaikkonen (Kaivo)

== Production staff ==
- Manne Railo (Mitro), Producer

== Releases ==
=== Albums ===
- Moe! (1990)
- Tulevat tänne sotkemaan meidän ajopuuteorian (1991)
- Epäviralliset Muistelmat (1996)
- Ouu-raisakson! (2000)
- Sekoelma (2010)

=== Singles ===
- Oi Beibi / Tuhansien sulojen maa (Megamania) 7" 12"
- Raptori (Megamania 1990) 12'
- Debi Gibson (Viiraa Pääzä Mix) (Megamania 1990) 12"
- Tyyris Tyllerö / Älä (Hekumaa) (Megamania) 12"
- Karvanoppaelvis / Sukellus Pumpuliin (Megamania 1991) 7"
- Rattijuoppo (Megamania 1991) 7"
- Debi Gibson (3000 Mix) (Reel Art 2000) CDS
- Kumitissit / Oi Beibi (Raptori vs. Caater)(Reel Art 2000) CDS
- Oi Beibi 16 (Sony Music 2010)

=== Videos ===
- Moe! (1990)
- Raptori (1990)
- Ajopuutaheinää (1991)
- Hiphopmusiikkia (1999)
  The music video for "Hiphopmusiikkia" is a spoof of "Freestyler" by Bomfunk MC's, filmed at the same Helsinki Metro stations.
- Oi Beibi 16 (2010)
- Tosi tarttuva täytebiisi 16 (2010)
