= Neljä Ruusua =

Finnish rock band

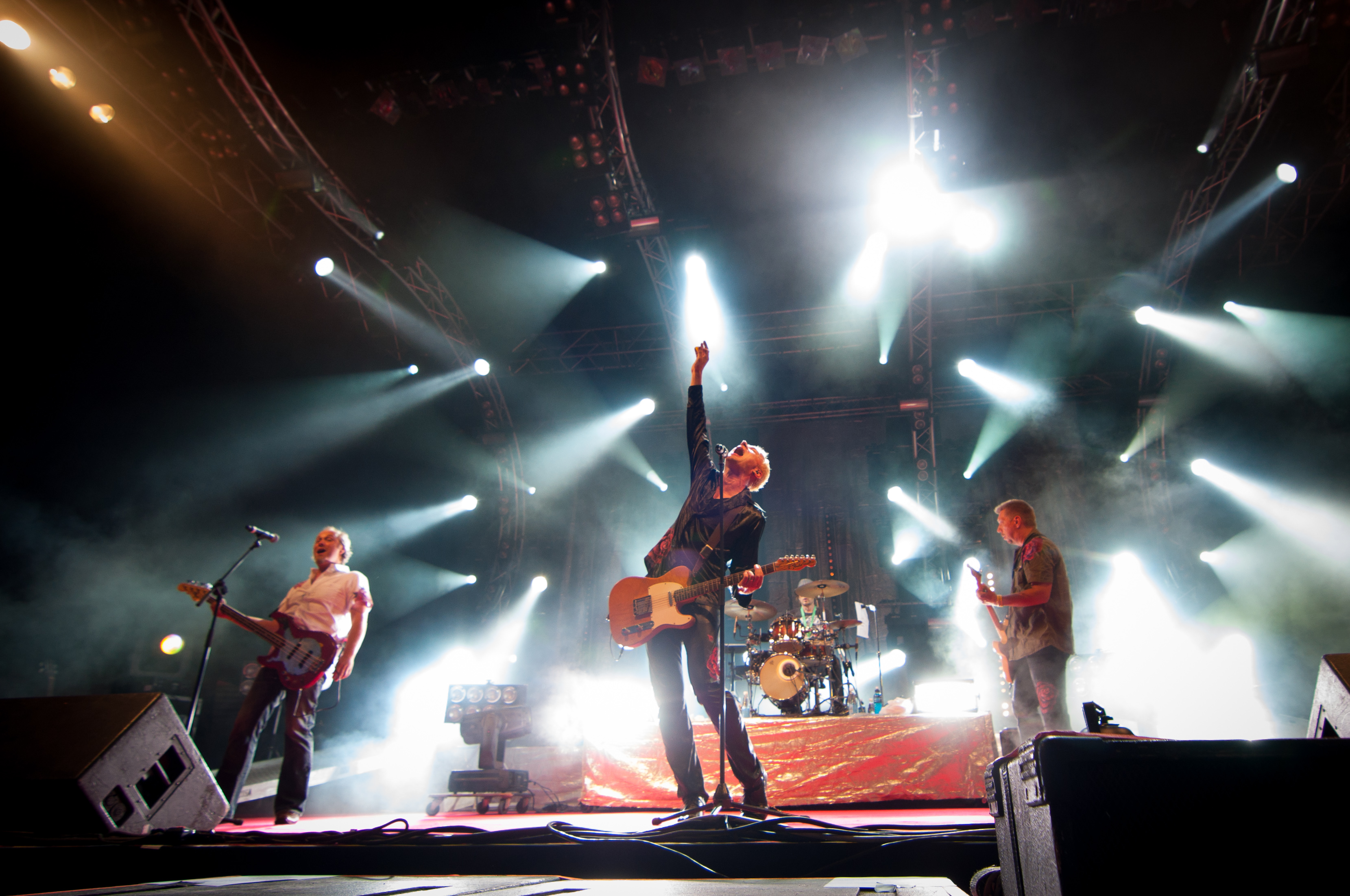
- Neljä Ruusua at the 2011 Ilosaarirock festival.

Background information
- Origin: Joensuu, Finland
- Years active: 1982–2007, 2011–
- Labels: EMI
- Members: Ilkka Alanko; Petteri "Kode" Koistinen; Jari "Lade" Laakkonen; Kari "Kämy" Kämäräinen
- Website: www.neljaruusua.fi

Neljä Ruusua (Four Roses) is a Finnish rock group formed in the city of Joensuu in 1982. The group consists of guitarist-singer Ilkka Alanko, guitarist Petteri Koistinen, bass guitarist Jari Laakkonen and drummer Kari Kämäräinen. Their style of music was influenced by punk in their earlier years, but changed over time to more conventional Finnish rock and pop music. The most popular albums of the band are Haloo (1992, Hello) and Pop-uskonto (1993, Pop Religion), which bought the band to a great popularity.

The band has released 12 studio albums, with two English albums, Mood (1996) and Not for Sale (1998), which were the band's attempt to break the English language market. After these two unsuccessful albums, the band returned to their native language and released their so-called comeback album Uusi aalto (1999, New Wave). On August 13, 2007, it was announced on the band's official website that the group retreats to spend a quiet life for an indefinite period, and they made their so far last public appearance on August 17. The band's future is completely open, any plans for recordings, concerts or other activities has not been established. In 2011 they played in the Ilosaarirock festival in Joensuu. On January 4, 2012, it was announced on the band's Facebook fan page that the group started recording their 13th album.

== History ==
The group formed in 1982 under the name Talouskukkaro, and changed their name in 1985; in the late 1990s, they made an attempt to break the English language market, and released some albums under the name 4R. The band's guitarist/vocalist Ilkka Alanko is brother of famous Finnish singer-songwriter Ismo Alanko.

== Discography ==
=== Studio albums ===
| Year | Title | Title translation (in English) | FIN Peak position | Certification |
|---|---|---|---|---|
| 1987 | Neljä Ruusua | Four Roses | | |
| 1987 | Kasvukipuja | Growing Pains | | |
| 1989 | Hyvää päivää | Good Day | | |
| 1990 | Hyvää yötä Bangkok | Good Night Bangkok | | |
| 1992 | Haloo | Hello | | |
| 1993 | Pop-uskonto | Pop Religion | | |
| 1996 | Mood (4R) | | | |
| 1998 | Not for Sale (4R) | | | |
| 1999 | Uusi aalto | New Wave | 1 | |
| 2001 | Valuva taivas | Flowing Sky | 4 | |
| 2004 | Karelia Express | | 1 | |
| 2006 | Ensi-ilta | Premiere | 3 | |
| 2012 | Katkera kuu | Bitter Moon | 4 | |
| 2015 | Euforia | Euphoria | 2 | |
| 2018 | Mustia ruusuja | Black Roses | 12 | |
| 2022 | 1000X | | 21 | |

=== Compilation albums ===
| Year | Title | Title translation (in English) | FIN Peak position | Certification |
|---|---|---|---|---|
| 1994 | Energiaa | Energy | | |
| 2000 | Popmuseo | Pop Museum | 1 | |
| 2012 | Haloo 20v. Juhlapainos | Hello 20th Anniversary Edition | 50 | |
| 2012 | Poplaulajan vapaapäivä – 20 suurinta hittiä | Pop Singer's Holiday – 20 Greatest Hits | 13 | |
| 2022 | 40 | | 31 | |

=== EPs ===
| Year | Title | Title translation (in English) |
|---|---|---|
| 2017 | Mustia ruusuja – Osa I | Black Roses – Part I |
| 2018 | Mustia ruusuja – Osa II | Black Roses – Part II |

=== Singles ===
| Year | Title | Title translation (in English) | FIN Peak position | Album |
|---|---|---|---|---|
| 1987 | "Sulje oveni" | Close My Door | | Neljä Ruusua |
| 1987 | "Itkupilli" | Crybaby | | Kasvukipuja |
| 1989 | "Vastaa!" | Answer! | | Hyvää päivää |
| 1989 | "Joulun tähti" | Christmas Star | | |
| 1990 | "Matkalla" | En Route | | Hyvää päivää |
| 1990 | "Sukellus" | Diving | | Hyvää yötä Bangkok |
| 1990 | "Hyvää yötä" | Good Night | | Hyvää yötä Bangkok |
| 1991 | "Elämä" | Life | | Hyvää yötä Bangkok |
| 1991 | "06:00" | | | |
| 1992 | "Juppihippipunkkari" | Yuppie Hippie Punker | | Haloo |
| 1992 | "Pullaa" | Bun | | Haloo |
| 1992 | "Sun täytyy mennä" (Remaster) | You Must Go | | Haloo |
| 1993 | "Kuka näkee" | Who Can See | | Pop-uskonto |
| 1993 | "Poplaulajan vapaapäivä" | Pop Singer's Holiday | | Pop-uskonto |
| 1994 | "Idänprinsessa" | East Princess | | Pop-uskonto |
| 1994 | "Meistä jokainen" | Everyone of Us | | Pop-uskonto |
| 1994 | "Energiaa" | Energy | | Energiaa |
| 1996 | "Mood" (4R) | | | Mood |
| 1996 | "Loving the Alien" (4R) | | | Mood |
| 1996 | "Come Down" (4R) | | | Mood |
| 1997 | "Gravitation" (4R) | | | Not for Sale |
| 1997 | "Sea of Love" (4R) | | | Not for Sale |
| 1999 | "Varjo" | Shadow | 15 | Uusi aalto |
| 1999 | "Hunningolla" | | 3 | Uusi aalto |
| 1999 | "Luotsivene" | Pilot Boat | | Uusi aalto |
| 1999 | "Olen niin pop" | I'm So Pop | | Uusi aalto |
| 2000 | "Uusi aika" | The New Time | | Uusi aalto |
| 2000 | "Sun täytyy mennä" | You Must Go | | Popmuseo |
| 2000 | "Popmuseo" | Pop Museum | 19 | Popmuseo |
| 2000 | "Yön yksinäinen" | Lonely at Night | | Popmuseo |
| 2001 | "Missä vaan" | Anywhere | 12 | Valuva taivas |
| 2001 | "Valuva taivas" | Flowing Sky | | Valuva taivas |
| 2002 | "Nuoli ja sydän" | Arrow and Heart | | Valuva taivas |
| 2002 | "Yhtyneet" | United | | Valuva taivas |
| 2004 | "Popstars" | | 4 | Karelia Express |
| 2004 | "Elän vain kerran" | I Only Live Once | | Karelia Express |
| 2004 | "Öisellä rannalla" | In Nightly Beach | | Karelia Express |
| 2004 | "Veri" | Blood | | Karelia Express |
| 2006 | "Soudat – huopaat" | You Row – You Back | | Ensi-ilta |
| 2006 | "Tahdon" | I Will | 17 | Ensi-ilta |
| 2006 | "Ensi-ilta" | Premiere | | Ensi-ilta |
| 2007 | "En voi" | I Can't | | Ensi-ilta |
| 2012 | "Seitsemän päivää selvinpäin" | Seven Days Sober | | Katkera kuu |
| 2012 | "Katkera kuu" | Bitter Moon | | Katkera kuu |
| 2012 | "Nuori ikäisekseen" | Young for His Age | | Katkera kuu |
| 2013 | "Toiset saa" (feat. Elli Haloo) | Others Get | | Katkera kuu |
| 2014 | "Sininen sunnuntai" | Blue Sunday | | Euforia |
| 2015 | "Ajelen" | I'm Driving | | Euforia |
| 2015 | "Esirippu" | Stage Curtain | | Euforia |
| 2016 | "Saaronin lilja" | Lily of Sharon | | Mustia ruusuja |
| 2017 | "Sähkökitara" | Electric Guitar | | Mustia ruusuja |
| 2017 | "Mustia ruusuja" | Black Roses | | Mustia ruusuja |
| 2018 | "Älä luovuta (Noli cedere)" | Don't Give Up | | Mustia ruusuja |
| 2018 | "Meidän maa" | Our Country | | Mustia ruusuja |
| 2019 | "Surutulitus" | | | 1000X |
| 2020 | "Muuttolinnut" | Migratory Birds | | 1000X |
| 2021 | "Viimeinen valssi" | The Last Waltz | | 1000X |
| 2021 | "Seuraan sua" | I'm Following You | | 1000X |
| 2022 | "Tähdelliset" | | | 1000X |
