= Tuomari Nurmio =

Finnish singer

Judge Bone a.k.a. Tuomari Nurmio
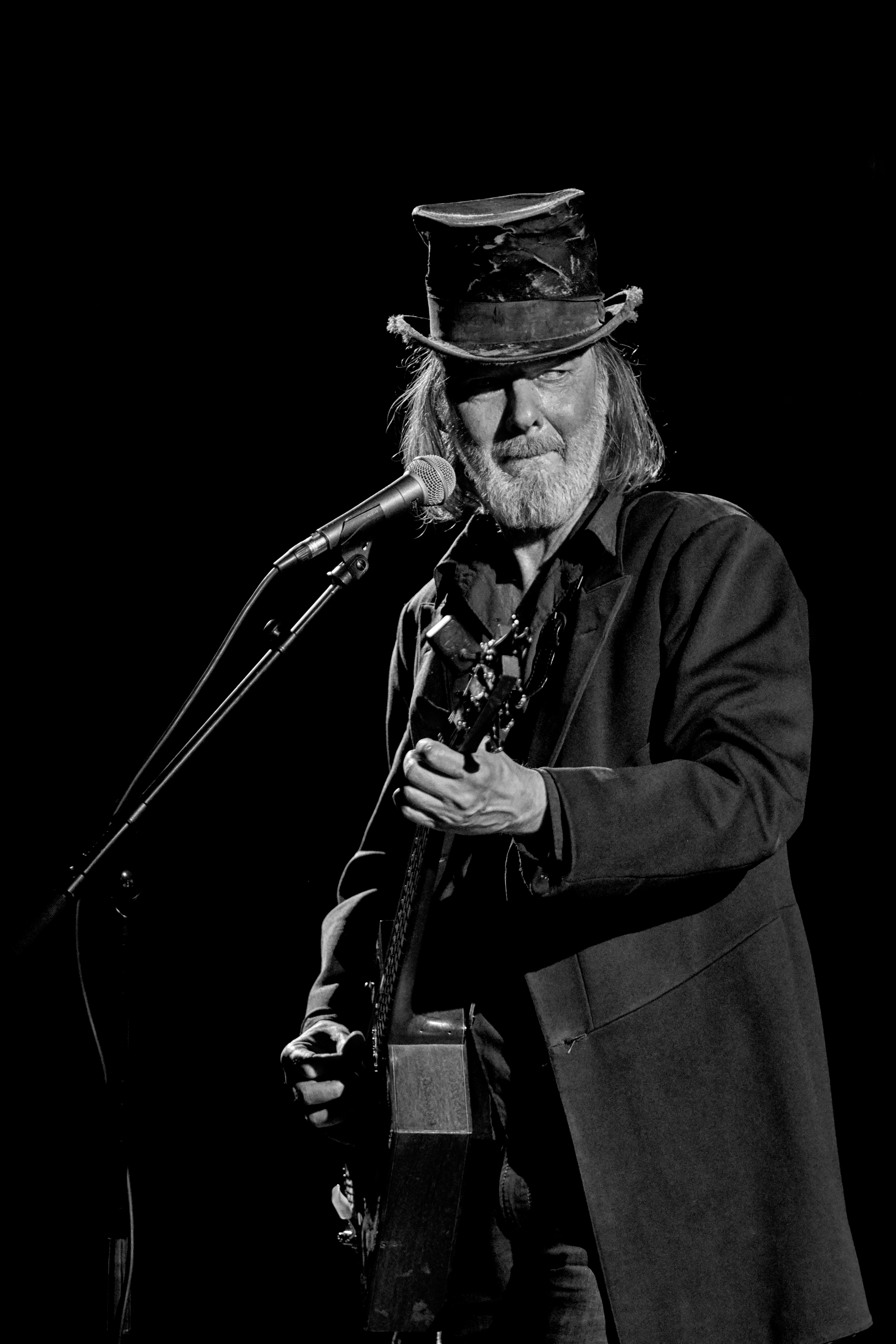

Background information
- Born: Hannu Juhani Nurmio; 21 November 1950 (age 75); Helsinki, Finland
- Genres: Rock, blues, folk
- Occupation: Singer-songwriter
- Instruments: Guitar, vocals
- Years active: 1979–
- Labels: Johanna, Megamania

Judge Bone, a.k.a. Tuomari Nurmio, is the artist name of Hannu Juhani Nurmio (born 1950 in Helsinki), a Finnish rock singer and songwriter.

== Work ==
Since his debut album, Nurmio has been regarded one of the most original Finnish singer-songwriters. His lyrics are filled with peculiar and arresting metaphors and expressions, some of which have made their way into the vernacular Finnish language. Especially the first four albums are now seen as classic works.

Musically the first albums draw on the traditions of American country, blues and roots music, combining them with new wave quirkiness and energy. The lyrics have romantic, humorous undertones, with occasional glimpses of the dark side of urban life. In the 1990s Nurmio's sound has moved towards a scratchy, rugged sound somewhat reminiscent of Tom Waits. In the 2000s he has often performed in a duo with a guitar and Markku Hillilä playing drums. In 2005 he collaborated with the Finnish world music band Alamaailman Vasarat.

In 2011 Nurmio appeared as a guest singer on Finnish metal band Korpiklaani's album Ukon Wacka.

== Background ==
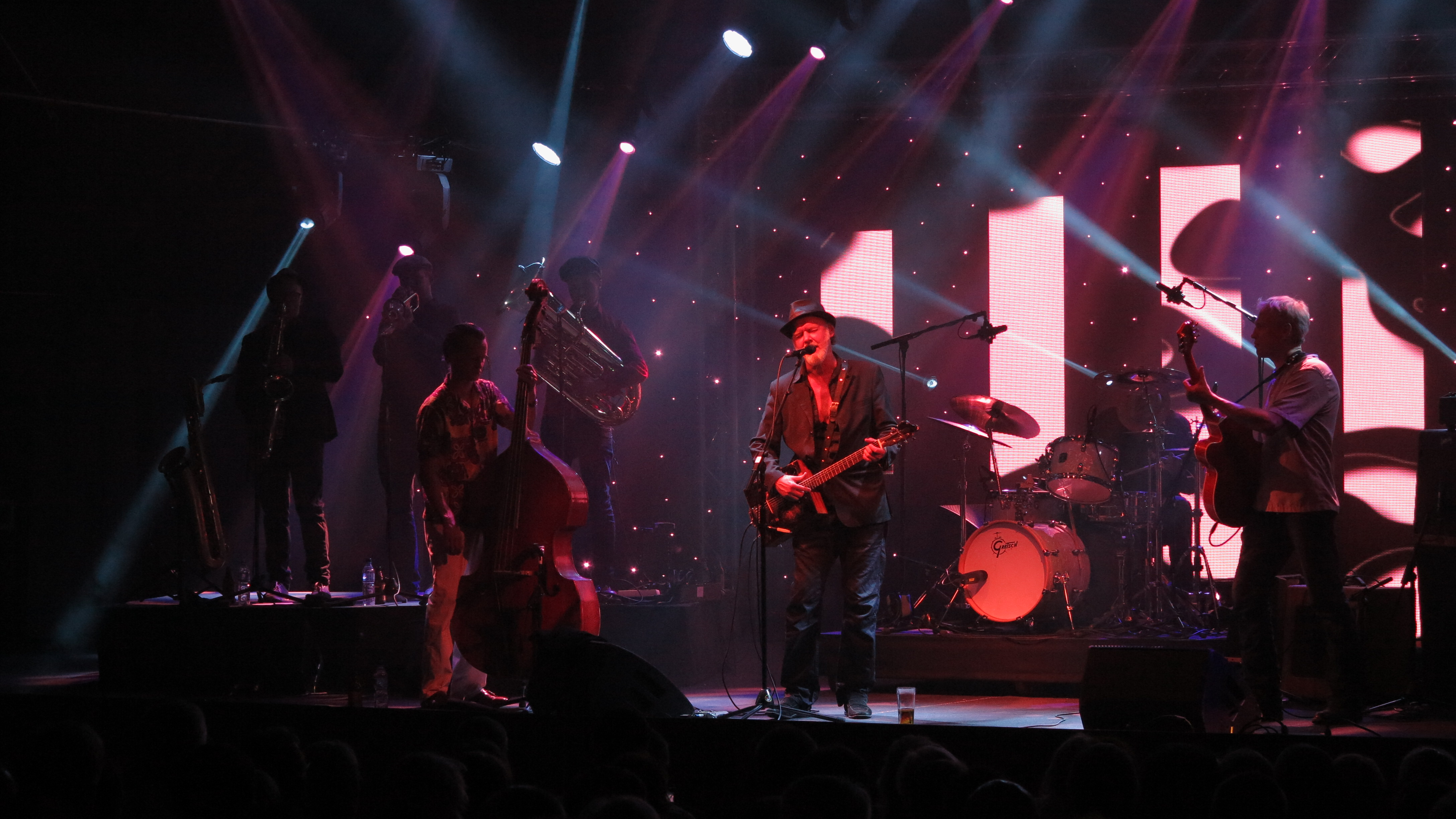
Dumari & Spuget & Blosarit during the Helsinki Festival in the Villa Tent in 2014

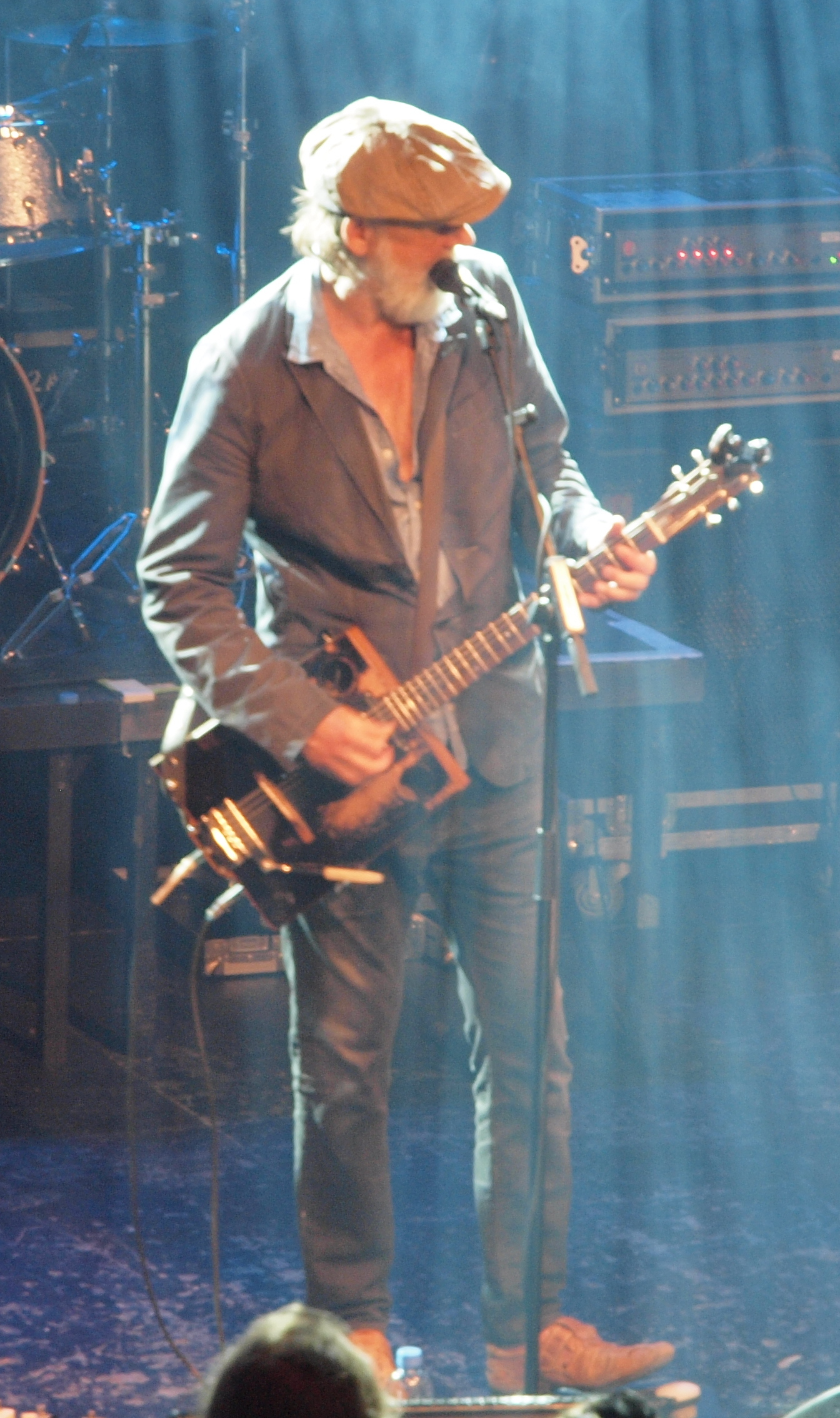
Tuomari Nurmio performing at the Tavastia Club in Helsinki, Finland.

"Tuomari" means a judge in Finnish. Nurmio adopted this nickname, since he has a master's degree in law and is therefore formally eligible to hold that position.

Nurmio started his studies at the University of Helsinki in 1971 studying general history, but soon switched to law. Before his musical career Nurmio worked as a reporter, first in the Soihdunkantaja magazine and later as editor of the Uusi Laulu magazine.

In the early 1980s he had already made a "strong decision" to quit his studies, but did not do so, because he thought that "all the work would be in vain". After his musical breakthrough he continued studying. His thesis was called "Prohibition of torture in international law". He graduated as a Bachelor of Law in 1983. Contrary to popular belief that he has never actually worked in law, he has done so for a few days. He defended an insurance claim for a widow and won the case. "You can say I have won one hundred percent of my cases", said Nurmio. He was also offered work as Matti Wuori's assistant but declined the job.

Nurmio started his musical career in the English language with American roots music, mostly country, folk and blues, in Dusty Ramblers and later on, during his solo career he has occasionally taken on an alter ego to more or less to go back to his roots in English. First it was Judge Bean, Jr, loosely inspired by a shady judge character in an old western movie, but it has since evolved into Judge Bone, by which name he has in recent years made two albums: Judge Bone & Doc Hill: Big Bear's Gate (a duo recording with his long time drummer Markku Hillilä on Bone Voyage, 2008) and in 2015 Tales of Judge Bone, vol 1 (Sony Music), which actually was credited to Tuomari Nurmio & Hoedown.

The latter is a long time Finnish roots music band (Esa Kaartamo: voc, guitars; Mika Kuokkanen: voc, guitars; Ninni Poijärvi: violin, voc; Jarmo Nikku: guitars. mandolin, banjo; Olli Haavisto: steel-guitar, dobro, weissenborn; Masa Maijanen: bass; Topi Kurki: drums) that likes to feature outside singers and players to play the guest's music or common favourites.

Tales of JB is composed of newly and often quite radically arranged old Nurmio songs plus an old Scottish folk song "Bonnie George Campbell". The overall mood might be described as old time Americana.

Judge Bone & Hoedown were expected to release volume 2 in 2016.

== Discography ==
=== Albums ===
- Tuomari Nurmio & Köyhien Ystävät: Kohdusta hautaan (vinyl LP: Johanna JHN 2001), 1979, (CD: Johanna JHNCD 2001), 1988, (remastered CD: Johanna JHNCD 2001), 2000, (35 Year Anniversary Edition vinyl LP: Johanna JHN 2001), 2014
- Tuomari Nurmio & Viides Kolonna: Maailmanpyörä palaa! (Johanna JHN 2009), 1980, (Johanna JHNCD 2009), 1988, (remastered CD: Johanna JHNCD 2009), 2003
- Lasten mehuhetki (Johanna JHN 2041), 1981, (Johanna JHNCD 2041), 1988
- Punainen planeetta (1982) (Johanna JHN 3005), 1982, (Johanna JHNCD 3005), 1989
- Meatballs: Meet The Meatballs (Beta 4008), 1984
- Käytettyä rakkautta (Megamania MGM 2004), 1986, (Megamania MGMCD 2004), 1986
- Kuu (Megamania MGM 2015), 1988, (Megamania MGMCD 2015), 1988
- Tuomari Nurmio & Hugry Tribal Marching Band (YLE CDY 86), 1992
- Hullu puutarhuri (Herodes HEROLP 04), (Herodes HEROCD 04), 1992
- Barnhill Boys: Hillbilly Spacecraft (Parlophone 7243-8 28433 2), 1994
- Karaokekuningas (Herodes EMI 7243 8 33354 2 8), 1995
- Tanssipalatsi (Herodes EMI 7243 8 38248 2 3), 1996
- Luuta ja nahkaa (Johanna 10001 20802), 1997
- 1999 (Megamania 1000 121052), 1999
- Tuomari Nurmio & Korkein Oikeus (Megamania 1000 121772), 2002
- Tuomari Nurmio & Alamaailman Vasarat: Kinaporin kalifaatti (Pyramid 1000 231382), 2005
- Tuomari Nurmio & Kongontien Orkesteri: Tangomanifesti (Pyramid RAMCD 3147), 2006
- Judge Bone & Doc Hill: Big Bear's Gate (Bone Voyage Records Bone-0082), 2008
- Paratiisin puutarha (Ratas Music Group RATAS0310), 2010
- Dumari ja Spuget (Ratas Music Group RATAS0513), 2013
- Dumari ja Spuget bailaa (Ratas Music Group RATAS0214), 2014, (cd and DVD)
- Tuomari Nurmio & Hoedown – Tales Of Judge Bone (Sony), 2015
- Dumarillumarei, Sony, 2017.
- Usvaa putkeen, Vallila Music House, 2019.

Compilation albums

- Valitut Palat (Polarvox LJLP 1016), 1982
- Valitut (Polarvox LJLP 1016), 1982
- Lasten mehuhetki + Kohdusta hautaan (Kasino KASIN-6), 1984
- Extra (Euros EXLP-1), 1989, (Euros EXCD-1), 1989
- 24 karaattia (2LP) (Pyramid RAMI 3033), 1990, (Pyramid RAMCD 3033), 1990
- Lauluja rakastamisen vaikeudesta (Megamania 1000 121242), 1999
- Lemmenloruja (Herodes EMI 7243 5 22639 2 9), 1999
- Suomi huiput – 20 hittiä (EMI 7243 592296 2 1), 2003
- Tuhannen kapakan lauluja (Megamania MGMCD 2212), 2005
- Dumari – raskauttavaa todistusaineistoa 1979–2009 (Megamania MGMCD 2255), 2009 (6 CD + bonus CD)
