= Ilkka Alanko =

Finnish musician

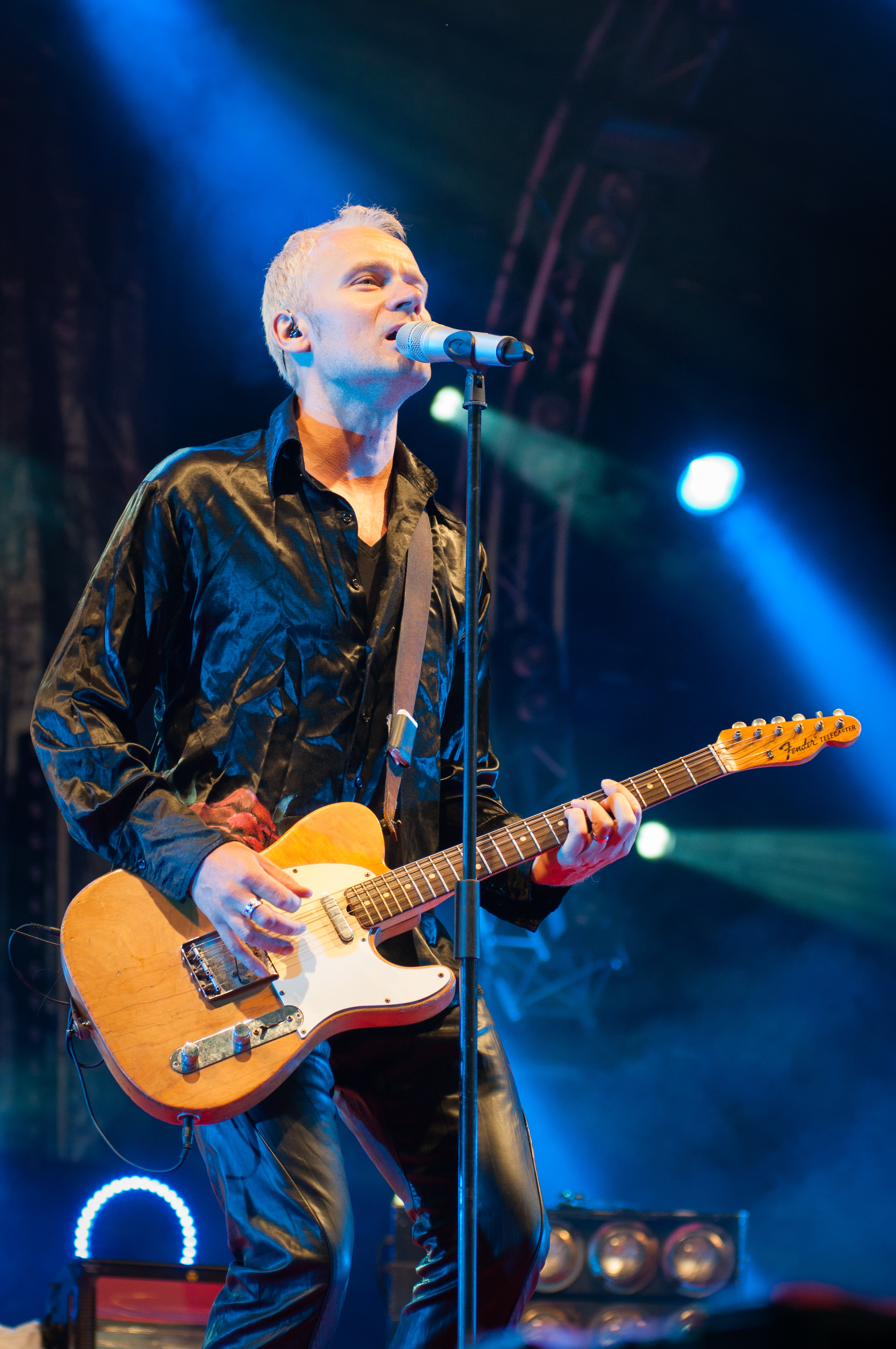
- Ilkka Alanko performing at the 2011 Ilosaarirock Festival in Joensuu, Finland.

Background information
- Born: Ilkka Tapani Alanko; 21 November 1969 (age 56); Joensuu, Finland
- Origin: Joensuu, Finland
- Genres: Rock
- Occupations: Songwriter, singer, guitarist
- Instruments: Vocals, guitar
- Years active: 1982–present
- Label: EMI
- Member of: Neljä Ruusua, Ilkka Alanko Orchestra
- Formerly of: Neljä Baritonia
- Website: ilkkaalanko.com (in Finnish)

Ilkka Tapani Alanko (born 21 November 1969) is a Finnish musician. He is a lead vocalist, co-founder, songwriter, and guitarist for the Finnish rock band Neljä Ruusua. Alanko's debut solo album Elektra was released in 2009, and it peaked at number seven on the Finnish Albums Chart.

Alanko is also a founder of the eponymous ensemble Ilkka Alanko Orchestra. In 2010, the orchestra released its debut album Ruusuja, which also spawned a television documentary Ilkka Alanko Orchestra – Poplaulajan työpäivä.

In 2010, Alanko won the talent show Kuorosota, the Finnish version of Clash of the Choirs, with his choir.

== Personal life ==
Alanko's older siblings Ismo, Petri, and Satu are also musicians.

Alanko is married to his long-time partner Tessa. They have two children, born in 2005 and 2008.

== Discography ==
=== Neljä baritonia ===
- "Pop-musiikkia" (1997)

=== Solo career ===
==== Albums ====
- Elektra (2009)

==== Singles ====
- "Kesä meidän" (2008)
- "Sattuu" (2009)
- "Etsin sua" (2009)
- "Kullanhuuhtoja" (2009)
- "Linnunpoika" (2010)

=== Ilkka Alanko Orchestra ===
==== Albums ====
- Ruusuja (2010)

==== Singles ====
- "Poplaulajan vapaapäivä" (2010)
- "Uusi aika" (2010, feat. Irina)
- "Elän vain kerran" (2011)
- "2011" (2011)
