= Kimmo Pohjonen =

Finnish accordionist (born 1964)

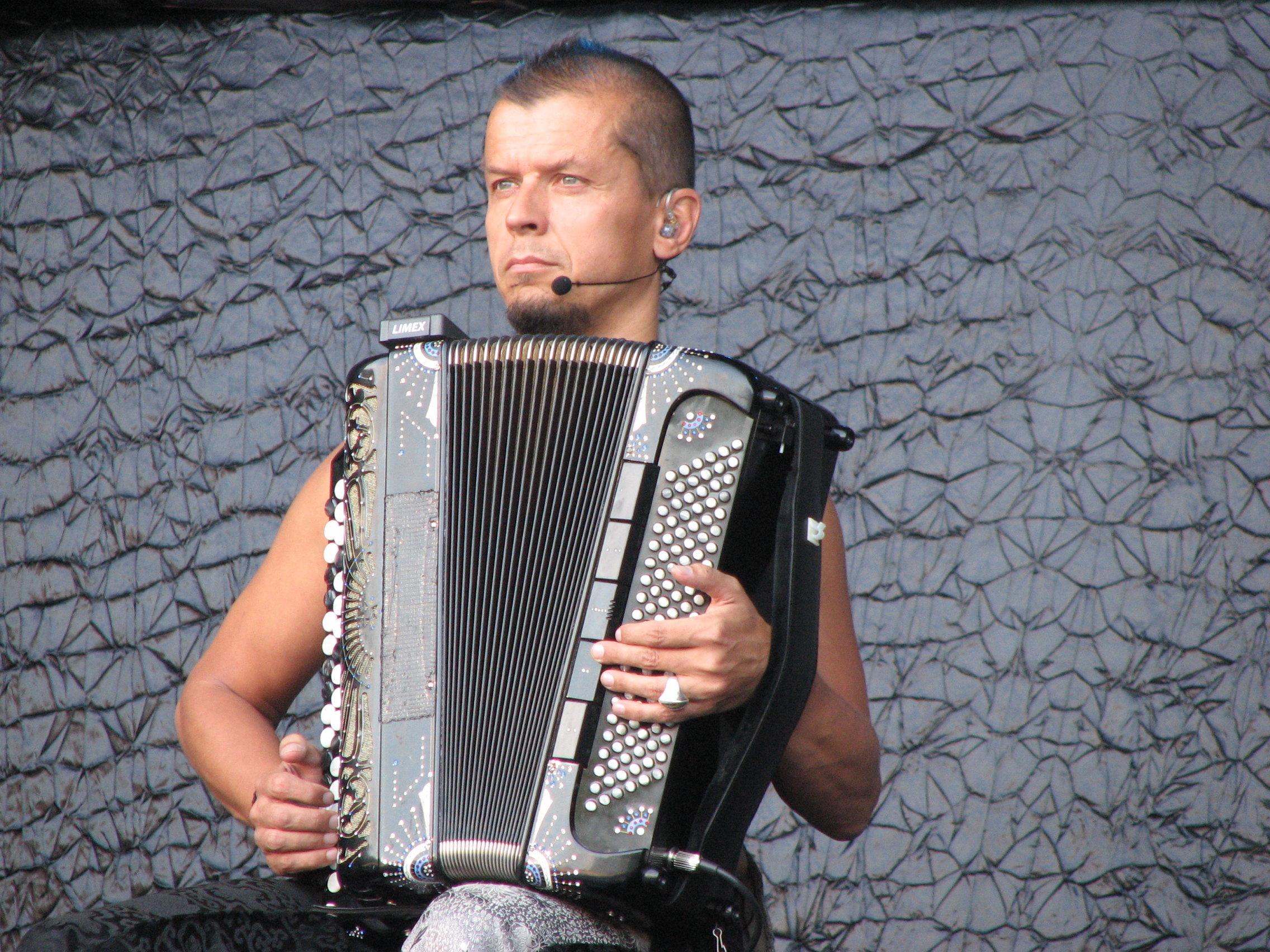
- Kimmo Pohjonen in 2011

Background information
- Born: August 16, 1964 (age 61)
- Genres: Alternative accordion
- Occupations: Musician, composer
- Instruments: Accordion, voice
- Member of: KTU
- Website: KimmoPohjonen.com

Kimmo Pohjonen (born August 16, 1964) is a Finnish accordionist who is known for his avant-garde and experimental work with his custom-made electrified and modified instrument. He has released nine albums of his work and has toured Europe extensively, as well as performances in Japan and some in North America. He records and performs both solo and in collaboration with musicians and other artists, including the Kronos Quartet, and percussionist Pat Mastelotto and guitarist Trey Gunn of King Crimson. Pohjonen still lives in Finland when not on the road. He has performed with one of his daughters, Saana, who plays the drums.

== Early life ==
Pohjonen began playing the accordion at age eight with the family's dance band. He grew up playing Finnish folk music and has called his father his first accordion hero, but says he did not really appreciate what the instrument could do until much later. After becoming interested in the accordion playing of Texas and Cajun Louisiana and of musicians such as Flaco Jimenez and Queen Ida, along with the music of bandoneon player Astor Piazzolla, he went to Buenos Aires to learn Piazzolla's tango nuevo.

He studied folk and classical music at the Sibelius Academy, a student along with Maria Kalaniemi and Arto Järvelä of JPP, beginning his career with Järvelä shortly after graduation.

== Career ==
Pohjonen began his music career in the 1980s. After graduation he recorded folk music with Järvelä and part of a duo called Pinnin Pojat (the Pinni Boys) and began to write folk music. The duo released four CDs including Gogo 4. As part of the short-lived group Ottopasuuna, with Kari Reiman from Värttinä, he released two albums.

He began a solo career in 1996, releasing his first solo album Kielo in 1999. Since the early 2000s he has focused on solo touring. Pohjonen has played for audiences all over Europe, especially Finland, as well as in Japan. He counts among his fans David Bowie, who invited the artist to his 2002 Meltdown Festival in London. He has had fewer performances in the Americas, but major appearances include South by Southwest in 1999 and a tour in Mexico in 2014, which included the Festival Internacional Cervantino.

He generally is involved in several projects at once, both solo and in collaboration with other artists. One major collaboration has been with the Kronos Quartet, which began in 2003. In San Francisco, he worked with the string quartet to create an 80-minute work called Uniko, which was premiered in Helsinki. Another major collaboration is with Samuli Kosminen and two King Crimson members, percussionist Pat Mastelotto and guitarist Trey Gunn. The four play together under the name of KTU (pronounced K-2) and have toured Europe extensively. They also produced an album called Eight-Armed Monkey.

Other collaboration include that with artist Maria Liulia, creating a multimedia show called Animator.

In addition to music, Pohjonen has been involved in television and film projects. He appeared on the 2013 television special Nordisk prisgalla, and episodes of television series Puoli seitsemän (2011), Strada (2010), Maria! (2010), Arto Nyberg (2007) and Later with Jools Holland (2000). He has written Yle Live: Kimmo Kohjonen Special (TV Movie, 2014), Soundbreaker (documentary, 2012), Salla: Selling the Silence (documentary, 2010), Jadesoturi (2006), Mayak (2006), Päivä isän kanssa (short documentary, 1999). He appeared as an accordion player on a balcony in the 1999 film Pikkusisar.

== Discography ==
- 1991 Ottopasuuna – Ottopasuuna (Green Linnet)
- 1999 Kielo (Finland: Rockadillo, Japan: P Vine)
- 2002 Kluster (Finland: Rockadillo, Germany: Westpark) a duo with Samuli Kosminen In Kluster, Samuli Kosminen, takes Pohjonen's accordion and voice and samples them through drumpads.
- 2002 Kalmuk (Westpark) with the Tapiola Symphony
- 2002 Kalmuk DVD Symphony (Lilith) with the Tapiola Symphony
- 2004 Iron Lung (Russia: Soyuz) (compilation from Kielo and Kluster)
- 2005 Kimmo Pohjonen and Eric Echampard – Uumen (Finland: Rockadillo, Germany: Westpark) improvised performances with French drummer Eric Echampard.
- 2005 KTU – 8 Armed Monkey (Finland: Rockadillo, Germany: Westpark, North America: Thirsty Ear, Japan: Besection)
- 2009 KTU – Quiver (Finland and Europe: Rockadillo and Westpark Music, Japan: Disk Union, America: 7dMedia)
- 2011 Kimmo Pohjonen, Samuli Kosminen and Kronos Quartet – Uniko (Ondine Records)
- 2011 Kimmo Pohjonen, Samuli Kosminen and Kronos Quartet – Uniko DVD (CMajor)
- 2012 Heikki Laitinen, Kimmo Pohjonen – Murhaballadeja / Murder Ballads CD (SiBa)
- 2015 Sensitive Skin (Octopus / Ondine)

Also appears on

- Beginner's Guide to Scandinavia, 2011 (Nascente/Demon Music Group)

== Artistry ==
Pohjonen's instrument is a large five-row chromatic accordion, which has been modified to include microphones, pedals and wires, which allows him to play acoustically and electronically at the same time.

Over his career the music he has produced on the accordion has included traditional folk, classical, rock and theater, but he is best known for avant garde and experimental music. He blends musical styles such as rock, electronic beat, jazz and more. His composition are mostly instrumental works, based on the accordion, along with his voice to some extent, and with other instruments when he collaborates with other musicians. He also experiments with technology, using loops and layering effects onto the accordion's natural sound.

Pohjonen believes in constant innovation in music, and his compositions range from delicate tones to the ominous, contemplative and even frenzied, accompanied by shrieks, shouts, chanting, and noises from non-musical instrument. His music has been described as "soundscapes" sound designed to evoke emotions and images. This constant experimentation has led him to be compared to Jimi Hendrix and Laurie Anderson.

He composes works during the winter months in Finland, improvising and playing for hours but does not write notes while improvising. While he says he has images in his head when he composes and plays, he is reluctant to share his own concepts about the meanings of his works. David Harrington of Kronos Quartet said, referring to hearing Pohjonen's music for the first time "Every once in a while you hear a musician and you think, 'why have I never heard this guy before?' That's what I thought when I first heard Kimmo's CD," he says. "The music was invigorating, life-affirming, disturbing, incredible – and kind of alarming. It was all of these things mixed into one experience. "

His live performances are uninhibited and athletic and have been called "extravagant" and "unhinged." and can included singing, acrobatics, electronic samples and art. Improvisation is central to his performances. Mastelotto says of performing live with Pohjonen "Dangerous, Intense. His energy and testosterone levels are high. We go into a trance on stage. Our performances are built around very dynamic musical arrangements and it seems to me at times like I am riding on a horse on an ocean wave – I let the bridle go and let this massive energy set the path over the shifting terrain."

Pohjonen is attracted to old customs and obsolete technologies, and these appear in his shows, such as sound from old farm machinery. One production featured the participation of Finnish wrestlers, who performed moves with Pohjonen in the middle. A number of the moves and actions are based on stories the wrestlers themselves told the musician. The idea for the show began when Pohjonen found out that in the first half of the 20th century in Finland, it was customary to have an accordion player to perform as a dramatic backdrop to the matches. He then began a process of forming a relationship with wrestlers, including appearing at practice bouts uninvited to play his accordion. For the Earth Machine Music tour he incorporated sounds from farms including banging an oil tank with a hammer, bleating sheep and other animal sounds. The idea was to bring sounds from farms to people in the cities. The tour was to four farms in England, where he recorded the sounds he could make at each one, then mixed with accordion composition in the studio. Final performances were at each of these same four farms. The Kalmuk project is named after a southern Russian tribe, and inspire by a painting by artist Martti Innanen, which shows elements of shamanism.
