= Ismo Alanko =

Finnish musician (born 1960)

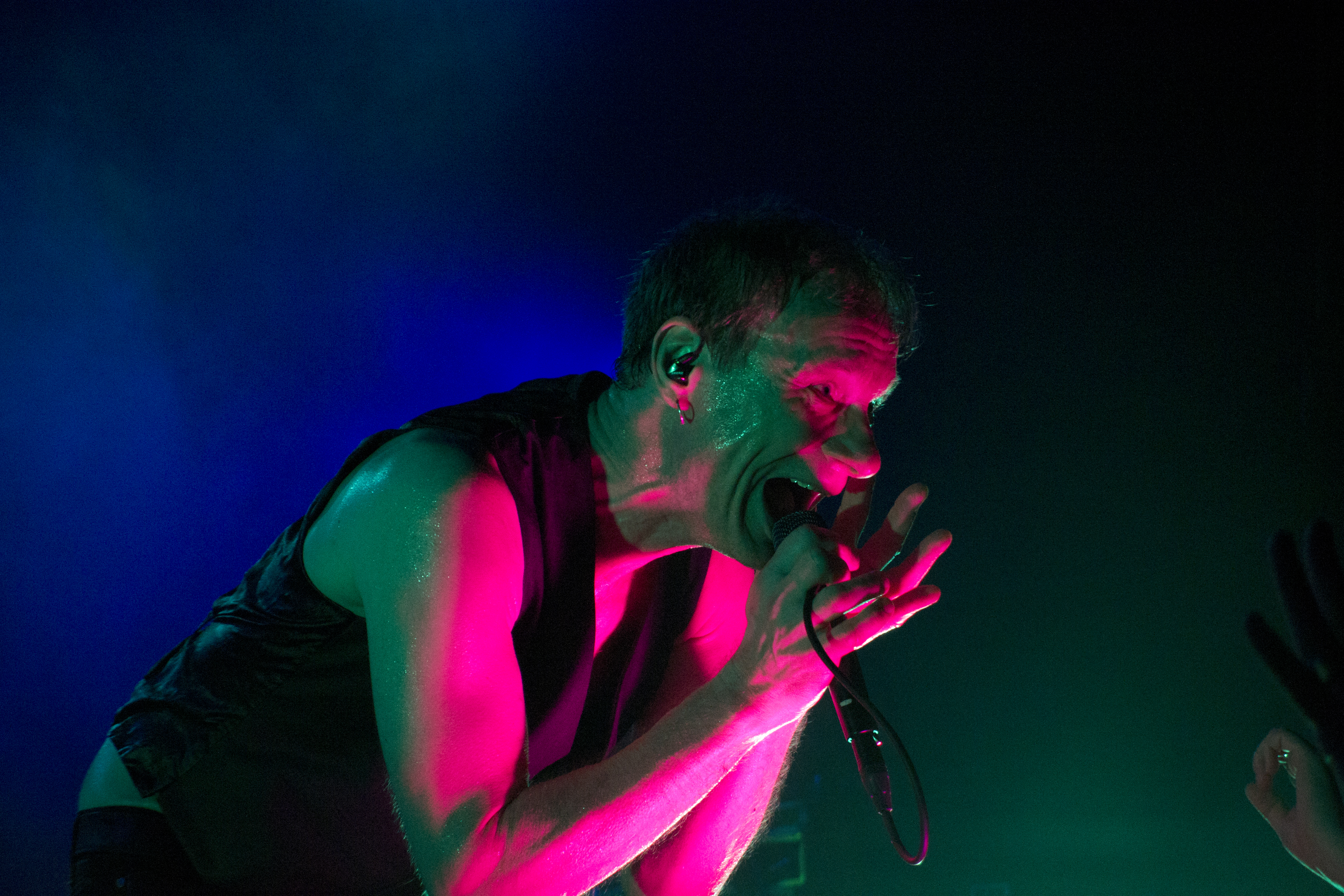
- Ismo Alanko at Teatria, December 10, 2011.

Background information
- Also known as: Kullervo Kivi; Jari Kullervo; Toomas Eest
- Born: Ismo Kullervo Alanko; November 12, 1960 (age 65); Kerava, Finland
- Origin: Joensuu, Finland
- Genres: Rock
- Instruments: Singing, guitar, bass, keyboards, cello
- Years active: 1979–present
- Labels: Poko, Fullsteam
- Formerly of: Hassisen Kone, Sielun Veljet, Ismo Alanko Säätiö
- Website: www.ismoalanko.com

Ismo Kullervo Alanko (Finnish pronunciation: [ˈismo ˈɑlɑŋko]; born November 12, 1960) is a Finnish musician. He is known as the frontman of several bands, most famously Hassisen Kone, Sielun Veljet and Ismo Alanko Säätiö, as well as a successful solo artist.

Alanko is known for his versatility and interest in different musical styles. During his career he has recorded punk rock, alternative rock, progressive rock, electronic music, schlager, dance music, children's music and film scores. He has achieved eight platinum records, 16 gold records and four Emma awards. Also a recognized lyricist, Alanko won the Juha Vainio Writer's Award (Juha Vainio -sanoittajapalkinto) in 2003 for his song texts.

In a City magazine article in 1999, 43 Finnish journalists picked the top 99 Finnish rock artists. Ismo Alanko placed 20th, with his former bands Hassisen Kone and Sielun Veljet placing 12th and 4th, respectively.

Alanko comes from a musical family: of his two younger brothers, Petri Alanko is a reputed classical flute player, Ilkka Alanko is the singer/guitarist of Neljä Ruusua, and his sister Satu Alanko-Rautamaa a violinist, and a member or the Helsinki Philharmonic Orchestra.

== Biography ==
=== Background ===
Alanko was born on November 12, 1960, in Kerava, but grew up in Joensuu, North Karelia. As a 15-year-old he played in a band called Sight, already writing some of his own songs. In the Finnish Rock Championship, an annual competition for young musicians, the band finished second in the progressive rock category. After completing his secondary education degree (ylioppilastutkinto), he took a break from music to move to work in Stockholm.

=== Hassisen Kone ===
After returning to Finland in 1979, Alanko, then 19 years of age, gained immediate success as the singer, songwriter and rhythm guitarist of the new wave group Hassisen Kone. They won the Finnish rock championship in 1980 and recorded three very successful albums, Täältä tullaan Venäjä, Rumat sävelet and Harsoinen teräs, where the band went from punk-related new wave to progressive rock. All three remain among the best-selling records in Alanko's career. Hassisen Kone disbanded in 1982.

=== Sielun Veljet ===
Soon after Hassisen Kone broke up, Alanko and former Hassisen Kone guitarist Jukka Orma started Sielun Veljet. Some of their early audience was expecting another Hassisen Kone, but instead the band played aggressive and repetitive post-punk. Only one Sielun Veljet album came close to reaching Hassisen Kone's album sales (L'amourha, 1985), but the band gained fame for their powerful, loud and intense live performances. The band toured constantly and played a wide variety of musical styles, including old schlager hits under the alias Kullervo Kivi & Gehenna. Sielun Veljet quit in 1991, after seven studio albums, two EPs, a box set and a 1991 documentary film titled Veljet.

=== Solo career ===
Alanko's solo debut, Kun Suomi putos puusta, was released in 1990. At this point Sielun Veljet still existed, but the band had become less and less active. After the band broke up, Alanko recorded the electronic music -influenced Jäätyneitä lauluja and toured Finland with his band that was named Tuonelan Lukio. The band's keyboardist was Izmo Heikkilä of the band Raptori. Alanko went on to release two more solo albums, Taiteilijaelämää (1995) and Irti (1996).

In 1997, a four-CD box set Alangolla – Ismo Alangon lauluja was released. It spanned his entire career starting from Hassisen Kone and including material from different side projects. Until then, very few Finnish artists had released a box set. Sielun Veljet had released Musta laatikko in 1991 and CMX their collection Cloaca Maxima in 1997.

Alanko's most popular song, "Pop-musiikkia", was recorded in 1997 with fellow rock stars Ilkka Alanko (of Neljä Ruusua), Kalle Ahola (of Don Huonot) and A. W. Yrjänä (of CMX) under the name Neljä baritonia (Four Baritones). The single has been certified platinum in Finland and is one of the most successful songs of all time on the Finnish singles chart.

In 2002, Alanko appeared on Timo Rautiainen's platinum-selling Tiernapojat play with Jarkko Martikainen, Toni Wirtanen and Rautiainen himself, playing King Herod.

In 2009, Alanko continues his varied projects playing with contemporary Finnish artists. In April he joined former Alanko Säätiö percussionist Teho Majamäki onstage as Teholla at Helsinki's mini-festival Arctic Paradise Live, having the same evening performed a solo concert in the Ateneum Art Museum series (A Land Without Kantele) with resident houseband of Jarmo Saari (guitars), Arttu Tolonen (bass) and Abdissa "Mamba" Assefa (drums).

=== Ismo Alanko Säätiö ===
In 1998, Alanko started the semi-ironically named Ismo Alanko Säätiö (Ismo Alanko Foundation). Though Säätiö performed many of Alanko's old hits, the arrangements were radically revamped to fit with their unique acoustic sound, heavily featuring the avant-garde accordion sound of Kimmo Pohjonen, a successful artist in his own right. Even though Säätiö is a band, it can be said that it is a backing band for solo performances by Alanko, as members of the band have changed rapidly.

=== Ismo Alanko Teholla ===
In 2007, Alanko ended Säätiö in its current form, and began touring with multi-instrumentalist Teho Majamäki as "Ismo Alanko Teholla". The name of the band is a play on words, and can mean either "Ismo Alanko with Power" or "Ismo Alanko in ICU (Intensive Care Unit)".

== Instruments ==
Alanko studied classical cello in his youth, but didn't pursue a classical career because he felt it would require too much practice. In Hassisen Kone and onwards, he has played rhythm guitar in his bands in addition to singing. He still occasionally plays the cello, as well as the piano, both in the studio and on live performances.

Alanko composed the music for the 2007 TV series Taivaan tulet by Kari Väänänen. Alanko also played all instruments for the score, except for flute parts that were played by his brother Petri. Alanko has said that the decision to play all the instruments himself came "out of curiosity".

== Discography ==
=== Studio albums ===
Year	Title	Performer	Chart Peak	Certification	Label
1990	Kun Suomi putos puusta	Ismo Alanko	-	Gold (1999)	Seal on Velvet
1993	Jäätyneitä lauluja	Ismo Alanko	31	Gold (2002)	Seal on Velvet
1995	Taiteilijaelämää	Ismo Alanko	17	Gold (1998)	Poko
1996	Irti	Ismo Alanko	3	–	Poko
2008	Blanco Spirituals	Ismo Alanko Teholla	1	–	Fullsteam
2013	Maailmanlopun Sushibaari	Ismo Alanko	1	–	Fullsteam / Sony
2013	Maailmanlopun Sushibaari-Erikoispainos (Special edition)	Ismo Alanko	12	–	Fullsteam / Sony
2015	Ismo Kullervo Alanko	Ismo Alanko	6	–	Fullsteam / Sony
2017	Yksin Vanhalla	Ismo Alanko	2	–	Fullsteam / Sony
2019	Minä halusin olla niin kuin Beethoven	Ismo Alanko	2	–	Sony
2021	Kaiken maailman kehtolauluja	Ismo Alanko and Oulu Sinfonia	6	–	Fullsteam / Sony
2023	Me olemme ihme	Ismo Alanko	2	–	Fullsteam / Sony
2026	Kevyt ja kohtuuton	Ismo Alanko	3	–	Fullsteam / Sony

=== Live albums ===
Released	Title	Performer	Chart Peak	Certification	Label
2013	Kolmannesvuosisata Taiteilijaelämää – Live	Ismo Alanko	6	–	Fullsteam/Sony

=== Compilations ===
Released	Title	Performer	Chart Peak	Certification	Label
1997	Alangolla – Ismo Alangon lauluja	Ismo Alanko	7	–	Poko
2001	Hitit 1989–2001	Ismo Alanko	11	Platinum (2004)	Poko

=== DVDs ===
Released	Title	Performer	Certification	Label
2006	Taiteilijaelämää vuosilta 1989–2006	Ismo Alanko	Gold (2007)	Poko

=== Singles ===
Released	Title	Performer	Chart Peak	Certification	Label
1993	"Extaasiin"	Ismo Alanko	-	–	Poko
1993	"Kuolemalla on monet kasvot"	Ismo Alanko	-	–	Poko
1995	"Taiteilijaelämää"	Ismo Alanko	-	–	Poko
1995	"Kun rakkaus on rikki"	Ismo Alanko	-	–	Poko
1996	"Kriisistä kriisiin"	Ismo Alanko	18	–	Poko
1997	"Pop-musiikkia"	Neljä baritonia	1	Platinum (1998)	Poko
2007	"Päästänkö irti"	Ismo Alanko Teholla	1	–	Fullsteam
