= Maija Vilkkumaa discography =

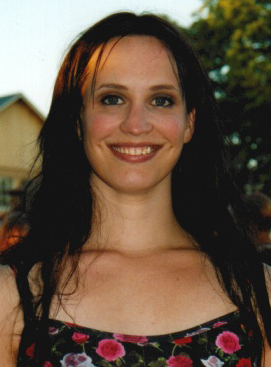
- Maija Vilkkumaa in 2001
- Studio albums: 8
- Extended plays: 1
- Live albums: 1
- Compilation albums: 2
- Singles: 22
- Music videos: 12
- Promotional singles: 2

The discography of Maija Vilkkumaa, a Finnish pop rock singer-songwriter, consists of eight studio albums, two compilation albums, one live album, 22 singles (including one featured single), two promotional singles and 12 music videos. According to Musiikkituottajat, Vilkkumaa has sold over 300,000 certified records in Finland to date.

== Albums ==
=== Studio albums ===
Title	Album details	Peak chart position FIN	Sales	Certifications
Pitkä ihana leikki	Released: August 23, 1999; Label: Warner Music; Formats: CD, digital download	3	*FIN: 38,406	*FIN: gold
Meikit, ketjut ja vyöt	Released: April 4, 2001 (CD); June 11, 2005 (digital download): Label: Warner Music; Formats: CD, digital download	1	*FIN: 36,983	*FIN: platinum
Ei	Released: 2003 (CD); June 11, 2005 (digital download): Label: Warner Music; Formats: CD, digital download	1	*FIN: 120,767	*FIN: 2× platinum
Se ei olekaan niin	Released: 2005 (CD); November 7, 2005 (digital download): Label: Warner Music; Formats: CD, digital	1	*FIN: 47,160	*FIN: platinum
Superpallo	Released: September 29, 2008; Label: Warner Music; Formats: CD, digital	1	*FIN: 19,264	*FIN: gold
Kunnes joet muuttaa suuntaa	Released: April 19, 2010; Label: Warner Music; Formats: CD, digital	1	*FIN: 16,691	*FIN: gold
Aja!	Released: September 18, 2015; Label: Warner Music; Formats: CD, digital	7		
1973	Released: 7 October 2022; Label: Warner Music; Formats: CD, digital	2		
"—" denotes releases that did not chart or were not released.

=== Live albums ===
Title	Album details	Peak chart position FIN	Sales	Certifications
Ilta Savoyssa	Released: June 13, 2007; Label: Evidence, Warner Music; Formats: CD, digital download	12	*FIN: N/A	*FIN: —

=== Compilation albums ===
Title	Album details	Peak chart positions FIN	Sales	Certifications
Totuutta ja tehtävää	Released: November 8, 2006; Label: Evidence, Warner Music; Formats: CD, digital download	4	*FIN: 25,620	*FIN: gold
Maija! Hitit 1999–2019	Released: March 8, 2019; Label: Warner Music; Formats: CD, digital download	20		

== Extended plays ==
Title	EP details	Peak chart positions FIN
Joku muu, mikä	Released: October 13, 2017; Label: Warner Music; Format: Digital download	38

== Singles ==
The chart positions refer to the two Finnish Singles Charts; the left column to the comprehensive, and the right to the digital sales chart.

=== As lead artist ===
Title	Year	Peak chart positions		Sales	Certifications	Album
Title	Year	FIN	FIN Digital	Sales	Certifications	Album
"Satumaa-tango"	1999	7	N/A	*FIN: N/A	—	Pitkä ihana leikki
"Salaa"	1999	11	N/A	*FIN: N/A	—	Pitkä ihana leikki
"Auringonpimennys"	1999	—	N/A	*FIN: N/A	—	Pitkä ihana leikki
"Hiuksissa hiekkaa"	1999	16	N/A (13)^{[A]}	*FIN: N/A	—	Pitkä ihana leikki
"Tähti"	1999	—	N/A	*FIN: N/A	—	Pitkä ihana leikki
"Ingalsin Laura"	2001	—	N/A	*FIN: N/A	—	Meikit, ketjut ja vyöt
"Totuutta ja tehtävää"	2001	—	N/A	*FIN: N/A	—	Meikit, ketjut ja vyöt
"Prinsessa Jää"	2001	—	N/A	*FIN: N/A	—	Meikit, ketjut ja vyöt
"Ei"	2003	3	N/A	*FIN: N/A	—	Ei
"Mun elämä"	2003	5	N/A	*FIN: N/A	—	Ei
"Ei saa surettaa"	2003	—	N/A	*FIN: N/A	—	Ei
"Se ei olekaan niin"	2005	—	N/A	*FIN: N/A	—	Se ei olekaan niin
"Kesä"	2005	—	N/A	*FIN: N/A	—	Se ei olekaan niin
"Liian kauan"	2005	—	N/A (24)^{[A]}	*FIN: N/A	—	Se ei olekaan niin
"Hei tie"	2006	1	N/A	*FIN: N/A	—	Totuutta ja tehtävää
"Suojatiellä"	2008	10	6	*FIN: N/A	—	Superpallo
"Luokkakokous"	2008	—	—	*FIN: N/A	—	Superpallo
"Mä haluun naimisiin"	2008	—	—	*FIN: N/A	—	Superpallo
"Lottovoitto"	2010	15	8	*FIN: N/A	—	Kunnes joet muuttaa suuntaa
"Dingo ja Yö"	2010	—	—	*FIN: N/A	—	Kunnes joet muuttaa suuntaa
"Kuuraiset puut"	2010	—	—	*FIN: N/A	—	Kunnes joet muuttaa suuntaa
"—" denotes releases that did not chart or earn certifications, "N/A" denotes less-than-gold-selling recordings or pre-2007 era without the digital chart.

- A These charted later as downloadable, non-single tracks from the latter, 2006 compilation album Totuutta ja tehtävää.

=== As featured artist ===
Title	Year	Peak chart positions		Sales	Certifications	Album
Title	Year	FIN	FIN Digital	Sales	Certifications	Album
"Kunnon syy (2010)" (Irina featuring Maija Vilkkumaa)	2010	—	—	*FIN: N/A	—	Yhdeksän hyvää ja kymmenen kaunista 2002–2010
"—" denotes releases that did not chart or earn certifications.

=== Promotional singles ===
These Maija Vilkkumaa singles were released for radio airplay only.

Title	Year	Peak chart positions		Sales	Certifications	Album
Title	Year	FIN	FIN Digital	Sales	Certifications	Album
"Peltirumpu"	2000	—	N/A	*FIN: N/A	—	Pitkä ihana leikki
"Noinko vaikeeta se on?"	2001	—	N/A	*FIN: N/A	—	Meikit, ketjut ja vyöt
"—" denotes releases that did not chart or earn certifications, "N/A" denotes less-than-gold-selling recordings or pre-2007 era without the digital chart.

== Music videos ==
- 1999: "Satumaa-tango"
- 1999: "Tähti"
- 2001: "Totuutta ja tehtävää"
- 2001: "Ingalsin Laura"
- 2003: "Ei" (featuring the actress Minna Haapkylä)
- 2005: "Kesä"
- 2006: "Hei tie"
- 2007: "Saaressa"
- 2008: "Suojatiellä"
- 2008: "Luokkakokous"
- 2010: "Lottovoitto"
- 2010: "Kuuraiset puut"
