= List of best-selling singles in Finland =

This is the list of the 100 best-selling certified singles in Finland, according to Musiikkituottajat – IFPI Finland.

Position	Artist(s)	Song	Release year	Sales	Certifications	Nationality	Source
1	Elton John	"Candle in the Wind 1997"	1997	54,225	5 × platinum	UK	
2	Mauno Kuusisto	"Kertokaa se hänelle"	1961	47,000	1 × gold	FIN	
3 (tie)	Ture Ara	"Emma"	1929	40,000	1 × gold	FIN	
3 (tie)	Viljo Vesterinen	"Säkkijärven polkka"	1952	40,000		FIN	
5	Annikki Tähti	"Muistatko Monrepos'n"	1955	38,000	1 × gold	FIN	
6	Nightwish	"Over the Hills and Far Away"	2001	36,518	3 × platinum	FIN	
7	Annikki Tähti	"Balladi Olavinlinnasta"	1955	36,000	1 × gold	FIN	
8 (tie)	Tapio Rautavaara	"Isoisän olkihattu"	1951	35,000	1 × gold	FIN	
8 (tie)	Katri Helena	"Puhelinlangat laulaa"	1964	35,000	1 × gold	FIN	
8 (tie)	Brita Koivunen	"Suklaasydän"	1956	35,000	1 × gold	FIN	
11 (tie)	Annikki Tähti	"Kuningaskobra"	1956	32,000	1 × gold	FIN	
11 (tie)	Georg Malmstén	"Särkynyt onni"	1929	32,000	1 × gold	FIN	
13 (tie)	Backstreet Boys	"I Want It That Way"	1999	31,000	3 × platinum	USA	
13 (tie)	Elvis Presley	"’O sole mio"	1960	31,000		USA	
15	HIM	"Join Me in Death"	1999	30,628	3 × platinum	FIN	
16 (tie)	Lasse Liemola	"Anna pois"	1959	30,000	1 × gold	FIN	
16 (tie)	Olavi Virta & Metro-tytöt	"La Cumparsita"	1953	30,000	1 × gold	FIN	
16 (tie)	Tapio Rautavaara	"Häävalssi"	1965	30,000	1 × gold	FIN	
16 (tie)	Aikamiehet	"Iltatuulen viesti"	1964	30,000	1 × gold	FIN	
16 (tie)	Harmony Sisters	"Kodin kynttilät"	1942	30,000	1 × gold	FIN	
16 (tie)	Veikko Tuomi	"Lehdetön puu"	1953	30,000	1 × gold	FIN	
16 (tie)	Helena Siltala	"Pikku Midinetti"	1958	30,000	1 × gold	FIN	
16 (tie)	Kauko Käyhkö	"Rakastan sinua, elämä"	1963	30,000	1 × gold	FIN	
16 (tie)	Olavi Virta & Metro-tytöt	"Tulisuudelma"	1953	30,000	1 × gold	FIN	
16 (tie)	Tapio Rautavaara	"Tuopin jäljet"	1963	30,000	1 × gold	FIN	
26	Tea Hiilloste	"Tytöt tykkää"	2007	28,724	2 × platinum	FIN	
27	Mari Laurila	"Aja hiljaa isi"	1966	27,000	2 × platinum	FIN	
28 (tie)	Renegades	"Cadillac"	1964	25,000		UK	
28 (tie)	Martti Innanen	"Elsa, kohtalon lapsi"	1967	25,000		FIN	
28 (tie)	The Sounds	"Emma"	1963	25,000		FIN	
28 (tie)	Olavi Virta	"Ennen kuolemaa"	1953	25,000	1 × gold	FIN	
28 (tie)	Tapio Rautavaara	"Juokse sinä humma"	1953	25,000		FIN	
28 (tie)	Harmony Sisters	"Kielon jäähyväiset"	1998	25,000		FIN	
28 (tie)	Veikko Tuomi	"Musta ruusu"	1962	25,000		FIN	
28 (tie)	Olavi Virta	"Mustasukkaisuutta"	1956	25,000		FIN	
28 (tie)	Irwin Goodman	"Ryysyranta"	1968	25,000	1 × gold	FIN	
28 (tie)	Harmony Sisters	"Sataman valot"	1937	25,000		FIN	
28 (tie)	Reijo Taipale	"Satumaa"	1962	25,000	1 × gold	FIN	
28 (tie)	Jörgen Petersen	"Särkyneen toiveen katu"	1962	25,000		FIN	
40	A-Tyyppi	"Ihanaa, Leijonat, ihanaa"	1999	22,897	2 × platinum	FIN	
41	Georg Malmstén	"Mikkihiiri ja susihukka"	1934	22,000		FIN	
42 (tie)	Aikakone	"Anna mun bailaa"	1999	20,000	2 × platinum	FIN	
42 (tie)	Lasse Liemola	"Diivaillen"	1958	20,000		FIN	
42 (tie)	Justeeri	"Kaksi vanhaa tukkijätkää"	1951	20,000		FIN	
42 (tie)	Justeeri	"Kalastaja Eemelin valssi"	1959	20,000		FIN	
42 (tie)	Kipparikvartetti	"Kaunis Veera"	1950	20,000		FIN	
42 (tie)	Georg Malmstén	"Mikkihiiri merihädässä"	1936	20,000		FIN	
42 (tie)	Kipparikvartetti	"On lautalla pienoinen kahvila"	1952	20,000		FIN	
42 (tie)	Mari Laurila	"Peppi Pitkätossu"	1969	20,000	1 × gold	FIN	
42 (tie)	Helena Siltala	"Ranskalaiset korot"	1958	20,000		FIN	
42 (tie)	Kauko Käyhkö	"Rovaniemen markkinoilla"	1951	20,000	1 × gold	FIN	
42 (tie)	Erkki Junkkarinen	"Ruusuja hopeamaljassa"	1975	20,000		FIN	
42 (tie)	Metro-tytöt	"Taikayö"	1953	20,000		FIN	
42 (tie)	Tapio Rautavaara	"Vain merimies voi tietää"	1951	20,000	1 × gold	FIN	
42 (tie)	Veikko Tuomi	"Vanhan vaahteran laulu"	1952	20,000		FIN	
42 (tie)	Irmeli Mäkelä	"Virran viemää"	1959	20,000		FIN	
42 (tie)	Erkki Junkkarinen	"Yksinäinen harmonikka"	1950	20,000		FIN	
42 (tie)	Metro-tytöt	"Äidin syntymäpäivä"	1954	20,000		FIN	
59	Jenni Vartiainen	"Missä muruseni on"	2010	18,192	1× platinum	FIN	
60	Georg Malmstén	"Mikkihiiri ja vuorenpeikko"	1937	18,000		FIN	
61	Neljä baritonia	"Pop-musiikkia"	1997	17,949	1× platinum	FIN	
62	Petri Nygård	"Vitun suomirokki"	2000	17,795	1× platinum	FIN	
63	Gimmel	"Etsit muijaa seuraavaa"	2002	17,719	1× platinum	FIN	
64	Timo Rautiainen & Trio Niskalaukaus	"Tiernapojat"	2002	17,478	1× platinum	FIN	
65	Madonna	"4 Minutes"	2008	16,799	1× platinum	USA	
66	Jenni Vartiainen	"Ihmisten edessä"	2007	16,547	1× platinum	FIN	
67	Poju	"Poika (saunoo)"	2011	15,600	1× platinum	FIN	
68	Ville Valo & Natalia Avelon	"Summer Wine"	2007	15,567	1× platinum	GER	
69	Las Ketchup	"The Ketchup Song (Aserejé)"	2002	15,483	1× platinum	SPA	
70 (tie)	Danny	"East Virginia"	1964	15,000		FIN	
70 (tie)	Erkki Junkkarinen	"Hopeahääpäivänä"	1952	15,000		FIN	
70 (tie)	Eila Pellinen	"Kaksi kitaraa"	1958	15,000		FIN	
70 (tie)	Matti ja Teppo	"Kissankultaa"	1972	15,000		FIN	
70 (tie)	Eero Väre	"Kultainen nuoruus"	1949	15,000		FIN	
70 (tie)	Laila Kinnunen	"Lazzarella"	1957	15,000		SPA	
70 (tie)	Esa Pakarinen	"Lentävä kalakukko"	1953	15,000		FIN	
70 (tie)	Metro-tytöt	"Leskiäidin tyttäret"	1953	15,000		FIN	
70 (tie)	Henry Theel	"Liljankukka"	1945	15,000	1× platinum	FIN	
70 (tie)	Brita Koivunen	"Mua lemmitkö vielä, Kustaa"	1960	15,000		FIN	
70 (tie)	Matti Louhivuori & Metro-tytöt	"Mummon kaappikello"	1954	15,000		FIN	
70 (tie)	Klamydia	"Perseeseen"	1998	15,000	1× platinum	FIN	
70 (tie)	Metro-tytöt & Kipparikvartetti	"Pieni ankanpoikanen"	1952	15,000		FIN	
70 (tie)	Pirkko Jaakkola	"Keltaruusu"	1953	15,000		FIN	
70 (tie)	Tauno Palo	"Ruusu on punainen"	1967	15,000		FIN	
70 (tie)	Georg Ots	"Saarenmaan valssi"	1957	15,000		FIN	
70 (tie)	Matti Louhivuori	"Suopursu"	1953	15,000		FIN	
70 (tie)	Reino Helismaa	"Suutarin tyttären pihalla"	1948	15,000		FIN	
70 (tie)	Sulo Saarits	"Sylvian joululaulu"	1956	15,000		FIN	
70 (tie)	Taisto Tammi	"Tango merellä"	1963	15,000		FIN	
70 (tie)	Kari Kuuva	"Tango pelargonia"	1964	15,000		FIN	
70 (tie)	Juha Eirto	"Tiikerihai"	1959	15,000		FIN	
70 (tie)	Eila Pienimäki	"Vanhan veräjän luona"	1959	15,000		FIN	
93	Katy Perry	"Hot n Cold"	2008	14,579	1× platinum	USA	
94	Lady Gaga	"Poker Face"	2008	14,227	1× platinum	USA	
95	Bomfunk MC's	"Super Electric"	2001	14,073	1× platinum	FIN	
96	Katy Perry	"I Kissed a Girl"	2008	14,072	1× platinum	USA	
97	Brita Koivunen	"Kuinka paljon rakkautta"	1959	14,000		FIN	
98	Lauri Tähkä & Elonkerjuu	"Pauhaava sydän"	2007	13,729	1× platinum	FIN	
99	The Baseballs	"Umbrella"	2009	13,375	1× platinum	GER	
100	Shakira featuring Freshlyground	"Waka Waka (This Time for Africa)"	2010	13,248	1× platinum	COL	

== See also ==
- List of best-selling singles
- Milestones on the Official Finnish Singles Chart
- List of best-selling albums in Finland
- List of best-selling music artists in Finland
