= Ilta Savoyssa =

Live album by Maija Vilkkumaa
- Released: 13 June 2006
- Genre: Pop rock
- Length: 1:47:07
- Label: Warner Music Finland

Maija Vilkkumaa chronology
Totuutta ja tehtävää (2006)	Ilta Savoyssa (2006)	Superpallo (2008)

Ilta Savoyssa (in English: Evening at Savoy) is the sixth album and the first live album by Finnish pop rock singer-songwriter Maija Vilkkumaa. Released by Warner Music in Finland on 13 June 2007, the tracks of the album were recorded on live performances of her debut concert tour Totuutta ja tehtävää. Ilta Savoyssa peaked at number 12 on its debut week on the Finnish Albums Chart and charted for eight weeks.

== Track listing ==
- Digital download

No.	Title	Length
1.	"Alkutarina" (Beginning Story)	3:05
2.	"Hiuksissa hiekkaa (live)" (Sand in the Hair)	4:44
3.	"Mun elämä (live)" (My Life)	6:02
4.	"Puisto puhuu (live)" (The Park Is Talking)	6:23
5.	"Totuutta ja tehtävää (live)" (Truth and Dare)	5:56
6.	"Tähti (live)" (Star)	3:43
7.	"Kitarasoolo (live)" (Guitar Solo)	5:44
8.	"Ei saa surettaa (live)" (You Shouldn't Feel Sad)	5:53
9.	"Katu (live)" (Street)	3:36
10.	"Hei tie (live)" (Hey There, Road)	4:31
11.	"Ei ikinä sun (live)" (Never Yours)	3:25
12.	"Rumpusoolo (live)" (Drum Solo)	3:49
13.	"Kristiina (live)"	4:36
14.	"Liian kauan (live)" (Too Long)	7:29
15.	"Se ei olekaan niin (live)" (But It's Not Like That)	5:07
16.	"Bassosoolo (live)" (Bass Solo)	1:08
17.	"Ingalsin Laura (live)" (Laura Ingals [sic])	7:18
18.	"Saaressa (live)" (On the Island)	3:41
19.	"Pianosoolo (live)" (Piano Solo)	5:17
20.	"Ei (live)" (No)	6:32
21.	"Kesä (live)" (Summer)	4:07
22.	"Satumaa-tango (live)" (Satumaa Tango)	5:01

== Charts ==
Chart (2007)	Peak position
Finnish Albums (Suomen virallinen lista)	12
