= Totuutta ja tehtävää =

Compilation album by Maija Vilkkumaa
- Released: 8 November 2006
- Genre: Pop rock
- Length: 1:13:35
- Label: Warner Music Finland

Maija Vilkkumaa chronology
Se ei olekaan niin (2005)	Totuutta ja tehtävää (2006)	Ilta Savoyssa (2007)

Singles from Totuutta ja tehtävää
- 1. "Hei tie" Released: 20 September 2006

Totuutta ja tehtävää (in English: Truth and Dare) is the fifth album and the first compilation album by Finnish pop rock singer-songwriter Maija Vilkkumaa. It was released by Warner Music in Finland on 8 November 2006 and peaked at number four on its debut week on the Finnish Albums Chart and charted for 15 weeks. The album has sold 25,620 copies to date in Finland, which has granted it a gold certification.

== Track listing ==
- Digital download

No.	Title	Writer(s)	Arrangement	Length
1.	"Hei tie" (Hey There, Road)	Maija Vilkkumaa	Niko Kokko, Mikko Kosonen, Tero Pennanen, Jan Pethman	3:48
2.	"Saaressa" (On the Island)	Vilkkumaa	Kokko, Kosonen, Pennanen, Jan Pethman	3:39
3.	"Ei" (No)	Vilkkumaa	Kokko, Kosonen, Pennanen, Anssi Pethman, Vilkkumaa	3:18
4.	"Totuutta ja tehtävää" (Truth and Dare)	Vilkkumaa	Janne Lehto	4:02
5.	"Satumaa-tango" (Satumaa Tango)	Vilkkumaa	Lehto	4:49
6.	"Noinko vaikeeta se on?" (Is It That Hard?)	Vilkkumaa	Lehto	3:39
7.	"Kesä" (Summer)	Vilkkumaa	Kokko, Kosonen, Pennanen, Jan Pethman, Vilkkumaa	3:53
8.	"Hiuksissa hiekkaa" (Sand in the Hair)	Vilkkumaa	Lehto, Visa-Pekka Mertanen, Anssi Pethman, Vilkkumaa, Anssi Växby	3:35
9.	"Ne jotka tyytyy" (Those Who Don't Ask for More)	Vilkkumaa	Kokko, Kosonen, Pennanen, Jan Pethman, Vilkkumaa	2:33
10.	"Anna-Liisa"	Vilkkumaa	Kokko, Kosonen, Pennanen, Jan Pethman	4:47
11.	"Se ei olekaan niin" (But It's Not Like That)	Vilkkumaa	Kokko, Kosonen, Pennanen, Jan Pethman, Vilkkumaa	4:23
12.	"Ei saa surettaa" (You Shouldn't Feel Sad)	Vilkkumaa	Kokko, Kosonen, Pennanen, Jan Pethman, Vilkkumaa	6:13
13.	"Liian kauan" (Too Long)	Vilkkumaa	Kokko, Kosonen, Pennanen, Jan Pethman, Vilkkumaa	3:51
14.	"Pohjois-Amerikka" (North America)	Ismo Alanko (lyrics), Sielun Veljet (composition)		4:23
15.	"Tähti" (Star)	Vilkkumaa	Lehto	3:19
16.	"Ingalsin Laura" (Laura Ingals [sic] [Wilder])	Vilkkumaa	Kokko, Kosonen, Pennanen, Jan Pethman	3:19
17.	"Mun elämä" (My Life)	Vilkkumaa	Kokko, Kosonen, Pennanen, Jan Pethman, Vilkkumaa	4:32
18.	"Seireenit" (Sirens)	Vilkkumaa	Kokko, Kosonen, Pennanen, Jan Pethman	5:32

== Personnel ==
The credits for Totuutta ja tehtävää are adapted from Fono.fi, a recording database provided by Finnish Broadcasting Company.

- Niko Kokko — arrangement
- Mikko Kosonen — arrangement
- Tero Pennanen — arrangement
- Anssi Pethman — arrangement
- Jan Pethman — arrangement
- Maija Vilkkumaa — vocals, lyrics, composer, arrangement
- Anssi Växby — arrangement

== Charts and certifications ==
=== Weekly charts ===
Chart (2006)	Peak position
Finnish Albums (Suomen virallinen lista)	4

=== Year-end charts ===
Chart (2006)	Position
Finnish Albums Chart	16

=== Certifications ===
Region	Certification	Certified units/sales
Finland (Musiikkituottajat)	Gold	25,620
