= List of number-one singles of 2006 (Finland) =

This is the complete list of physical number-one singles sold in Finland in 2006 according to the Official Finnish Charts, composed by Suomen Ääni- ja kuvatallennetuottajat ÄKT (since late August 2010, known as Musiikkituottajat – IFPI Finland).

== Chart history ==
Issue date	Single	Artist(s)	Reference(s)
Week 1	"Don't Forget About Us"	Mariah Carey	
Week 2	"House of Sleep"	Amorphis	
Week 3	"So Long Goodbye"	X-Prophets	
Week 4	"Spaceball"	Mannhai	
Week 5	"So Long Goodbye"	X-Prophets	
Week 6	"Guardian Angel"	Lovex	
Week 7	"Guardian Angel"	Lovex	
Week 8	"Revenge Is Coarse"	SinKing	
Week 9	"Pirut"	Nemo	
Week 10	"Falling"	Passionworks	
Week 11	"Fashion"	Ninja	
Week 12	"Stupid Girls"	Pink	
Week 13	"Punainen viiva"	Timo Rautiainen	
Week 14	"Punainen viiva"	Timo Rautiainen	
Week 15	"Teen mitä teen"	Smak	
Week 16	"Road"	Don Johnson Big Band	
Week 17	"Maailma on renki"	Lauri Tähkä & Elonkerjuu	
Week 18	"Maailma on renki"	Lauri Tähkä & Elonkerjuu	
Week 19	"Hard Rock Hallelujah"	Lordi	
Week 20	"Speechless"	Mish Mash	
Week 21	"You"	Tarot	
Week 22	"You"	Tarot	
Week 23	"4D"	Kuolleet Intiaanit	
Week 24	"Sauna päälle!"	Bloodpit	
Week 25	"Mikä kesä"	Valvomo	
Week 26	"Mikä kesä"	Valvomo	
Week 27	"Mikä kesä"	Valvomo	
Week 28	"Mikä kesä"	Valvomo	
Week 29	"Mikä kesä"	Valvomo	
Week 30	"Mikä kesä"	Valvomo	
Week 31	"Mikä kesä"	Valvomo	
Week 32	"Vapaus johtaa kansaa"	CMX (feat. Kotiteollisuus and 51koodia)	
Week 33	"Vapaus johtaa kansaa"	CMX (feat. Kotiteollisuus and 51koodia)	
Week 34	"The Reincarnation of Benjamin Breeg"	Iron Maiden	
Week 35	"Vapaus johtaa kansaa"	CMX (feat. Kotiteollisuus and 51koodia)	
Week 36	"Who's Your Daddy?"	Lordi	
Week 37	"Planet of the Sun"	Negative	
Week 38	"Crazy Wild One"	Peer Günt	
Week 39	"Hei tie"	Maija Vilkkumaa	
Week 40	"Likainen parketti"	Stam1na	
Week 41	"Arkunnaula"	Kotiteollisuus	
Week 42	"Arkunnaula"	Kotiteollisuus	
Week 43	"Viides vuodenaika"	Mokoma	
Week 44	"Viides vuodenaika"	Mokoma	
Week 45	"Put Your Hands Up 4 Detroit"	Fedde le Grand	
Week 46	"Ah ahtaita aikoja"	Viikate	
Week 47	"Replica 2006"	Sonata Arctica	
Week 48	"In Joy and Sorrow"	HIM	
Week 49	"Koneeseen kadonnut"	Apulanta	
Week 50	"Koneeseen kadonnut"	Apulanta	
Week 51	"Koneeseen kadonnut"	Apulanta	
Week 52	"Koneeseen kadonnut"	Apulanta	
