= Unto Mononen =

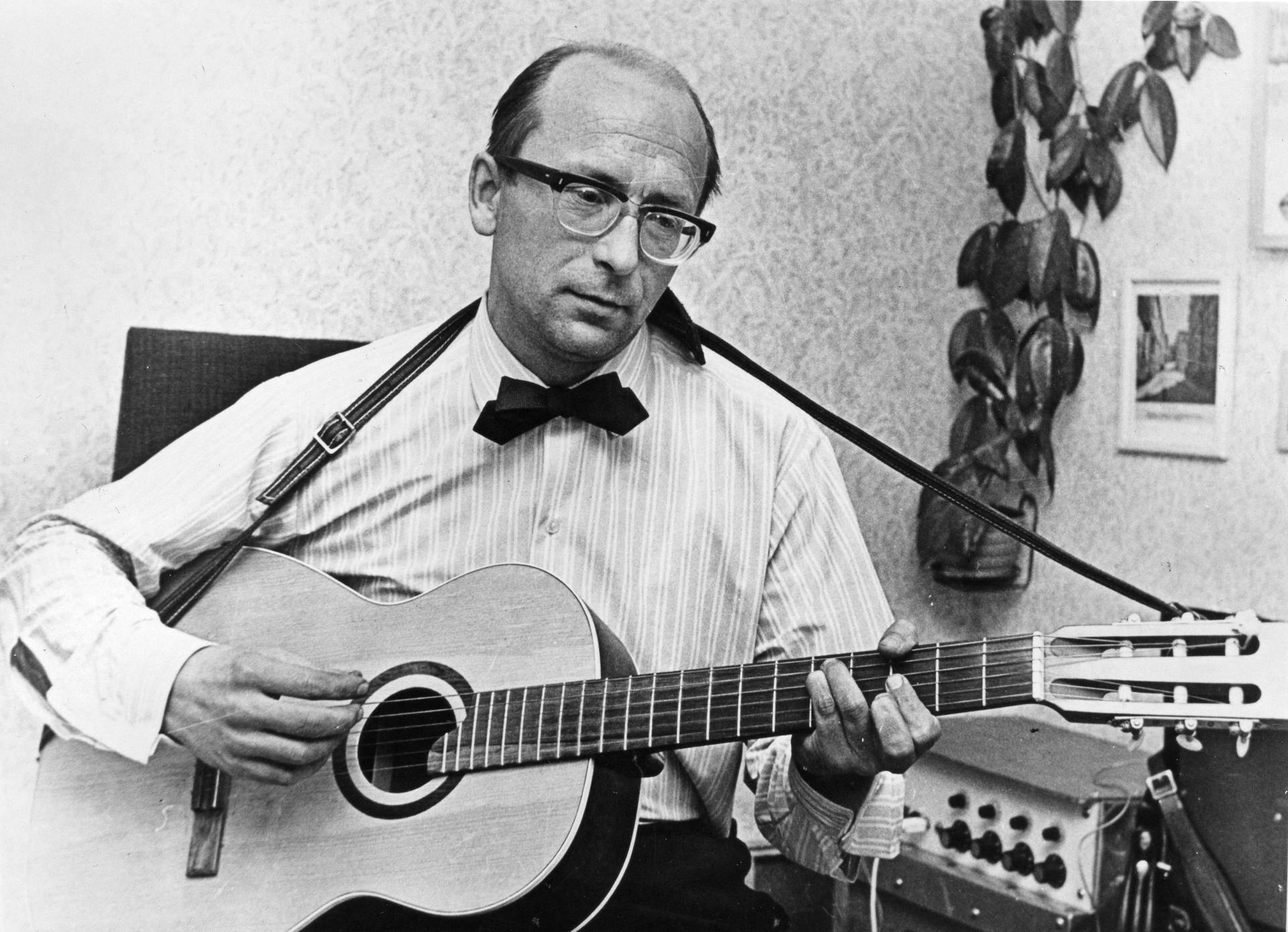
- Unto Mononen (1967).

Background information
- Born: Uuno Unto Mononen; 23 October 1930; Muolaa, Finland
- Died: 28 June 1968 (aged 37) Somero, Finland
- Genres: Finnish tango
- Occupations: Songwriter, Lyricists
- Years active: 1950-1968

Unto Uuno Mononen (23 October 1930 in Muolaa – 28 June 1968 in Somero) was a Finnish songwriter and musician. He is best known for his numerous tango compositions including the famous Finnish tango song, "Satumaa". His first name was originally Uuno.

== Biography ==
Mononen is often said to come from Somero, but he was actually from Muolaa. He first came to Somero after the Second World War was over when Muolaa was conquered by the Soviet Union. Mononen studied church music in the University of Turku. He quit these studies since he felt he did not learn anything important. As a composer, he was self-taught. Mononen began his musical career by singing with local dance groups while he was under 20. After a failed operation to his adenoids damaged his voice, Mononen started to compose music.

In 1950, Mononen first successfully sold his songs to a record company. The first song recorded was "Pieni laulu" ("A small song"), a waltz sung by Pentti Halme. In 1955, Henry Theel recorded the famous "Satumaa" to some success, but the song's status was not cemented until seven years later, in 1962, when Reijo Taipale recorded it.

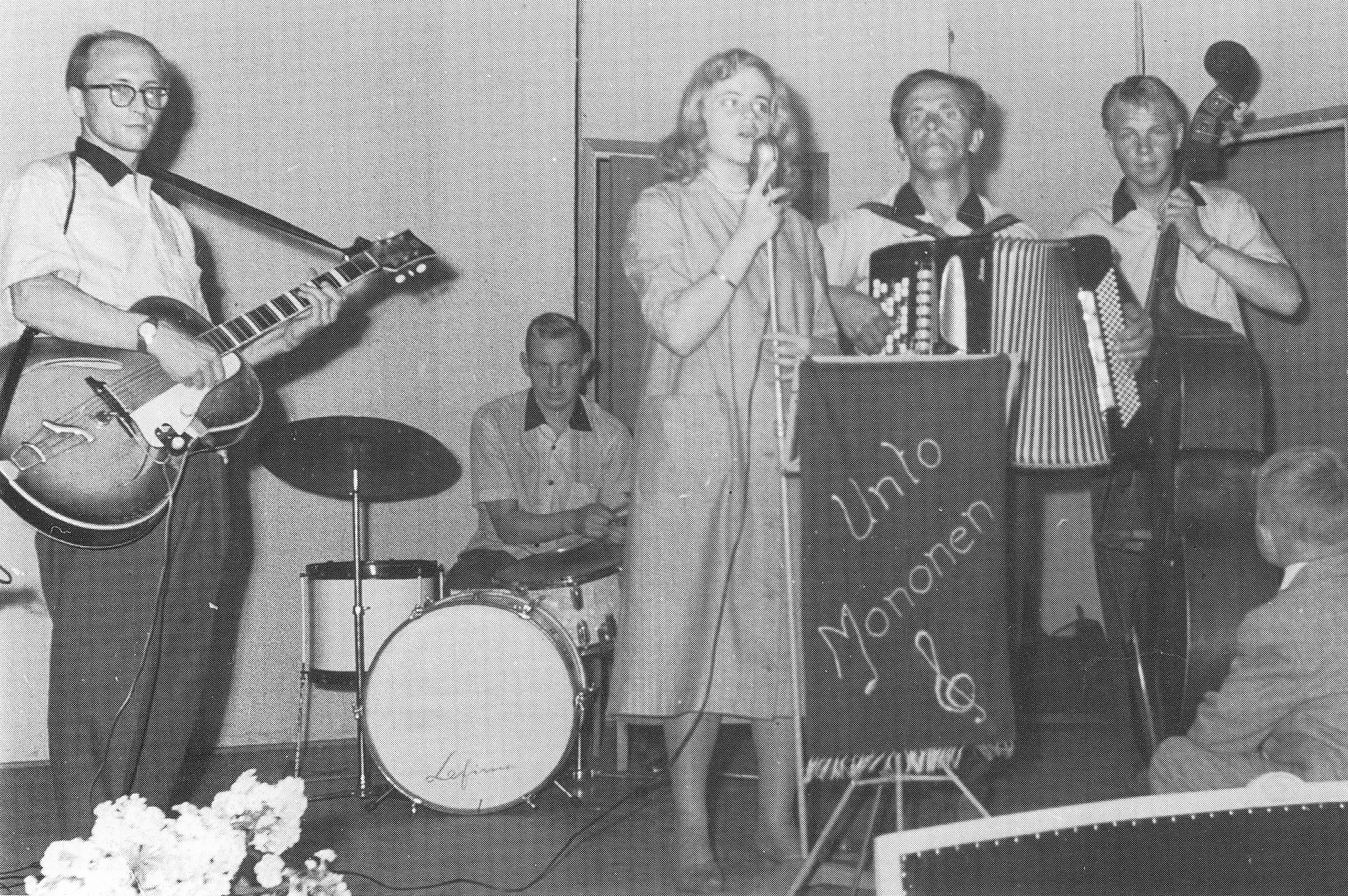
Playing guitar with his own band in 1959.

Other famous tangos by Mononen include "Tähdet meren yllä" ("Stars above the Sea"), "Lapin Tango'' ("The Tango of Lappland"), "Erottamattomat" ("Inseparables"), "Kangastus" ("The Mirage"), "Kaipuuni Tango" ("The Tango of my Longing"), "Kohtalon Tango" ("The Tango of Destiny") and "Yön Hiljaisuudessa" ("In the Silence of Night"). The last two of these became renowned when another famous musician from Somero, singer Rauli "Badding" Somerjoki, recorded them. Singer Esko Rahkonen also worked with the composer in the 1960s.

One of the most well known figures in Finnish popular culture, provocative entertainer M. A. Numminen had played drums in Mononen's band. Later, Numminen asked Mononen to compose a humorous tango to his lyrics. Mononen answered that for Numminen, he would write a tango even to the words of a phone book. From this collaboration, the song "Naiseni kanssa eduskuntatalon puistossa" ("With my Woman at the Park of the Parliament House") was born.

During his later years, Mononen suffered from alcoholism and eventually shot himself with a pistol on 28 June 1968 in Somero, Finland. He was 37 years old at the time of his death.
