= Tytöt tykkää =

Single by Tea

from the album Tytöt tykkää
- Released: 13 June 2007
- Genre: Pop
- Length: 3:19
- Label: EMI Finland
- Songwriters: Jarkko Ehnqvist (lyrics); Ehnqvist (composition); Ehnqvist, Tea Hiilloste (arrangement)

Tea singles chronology
"Tytöt tykkää" (2007)	"C'mon C'mon" (2008)

Music video
- "Tytöt tykkää" on YouTube

"Tytöt tykkää" ("Girls Are Fond [of That]") is a Finnish-language song by Finnish pop singer Tea, released on 13 June 2007 by EMI Finland as the lead single from her debut studio album Tytöt tykkää. The song peaked at number one on the Finnish Singles Chart in late July 2007 and sold double platinum in the country with over 28,000 copies. As of 2 January 2026, the song ranks 26th on the list of the best-selling singles of all time in Finland.

== Track listing ==
- Digital download

No.	Title	Length
1.	"Tytöt tykkää" (Girls Are Fond [of That])	3:19

== Charts ==
=== Weekly charts ===
Chart (2007)	Peak position
Finland (Suomen virallinen lista)	1

=== Year-end charts ===
Chart (2007)	Position
Finland (Suomen virallinen lista)	3

== Certifications ==
Certifications for "Tytöt tykkää"
Region	Certification	Certified units/sales
Finland (Musiikkituottajat)	2× Platinum	28,724
^{‡} Sales+streaming figures based on certification alone.

== See also ==
- List of best-selling singles in Finland
