= 1973 (disambiguation) =

1973 was a common year starting on Monday of the Gregorian calendar.

1973 may also refer to:

- 1973 (number)
- "1973" (song), a 2007 song by James Blunt
- United Nations Security Council Resolution 1973
- 1973 (album), a 2012 album by Seirom
- 1973 (Maija Vilkkumaa album), 2022
