= Aja! =

Studio album by Maija Vilkkumaa
- Released: September 18, 2015
- Genre: Electronic, pop
- Length: 39:04
- Label: Warner Music Finland, WEA

Maija Vilkkumaa chronology
Kunnes joet muuttaa suuntaa (2010)	Aja! (2015)	1973 (2022)

Singles from Aja!
- 1. "Lissu ja mä" Released: May 22, 2015; 2. "Kissavideoita" Released: September 11, 2015

Professional ratings
Review scores
Source	Rating
Helsingin Sanomat	3/5 stars
Keskisuomalainen	5/5
Rumba	7.1/10
Soundi	2/5 stars

Aja! (in English: Drive!) is the seventh studio album by Finnish pop rock singer-songwriter Maija Vilkkumaa. It was released on September 18, 2015. The album is produced by Hank Solo. The album reached seventh place on its first week on The Official Finnish Charts

== Singles ==
Two singles were released from Aja!, "Lissu ja mä" on May 22, 2015, and "Kissavideoita" on September 11, 2015.

== Track listing ==
The (rough) English translations of the tracks are in the brackets.

No.	Title	Length
1.	"Onnea" (Good Luck / Congratulations)	5:00
2.	"Aja!" (Drive!)	4:01
3.	"Kissavideoita" (Cat Videos)	3:52
4.	"Lissu ja mä" (Lissu and I)	4:21
5.	"Kenen sylissä istuit" (The One Whose Lap You Sat On)	3:59
6.	"Parempii aikoja" (Better Times)	3:52
7.	"Uula"	3:06
8.	"Onkse väärin" (Is It Wrong?)	3:37
9.	"Bonnie & Clyde"	4:09
10.	"En kadu hetkeäkään" (I Don't Regret a Single Moment)	3:28
