= Chisu =

Finnish musician (born 1982)

Christel Roosberg
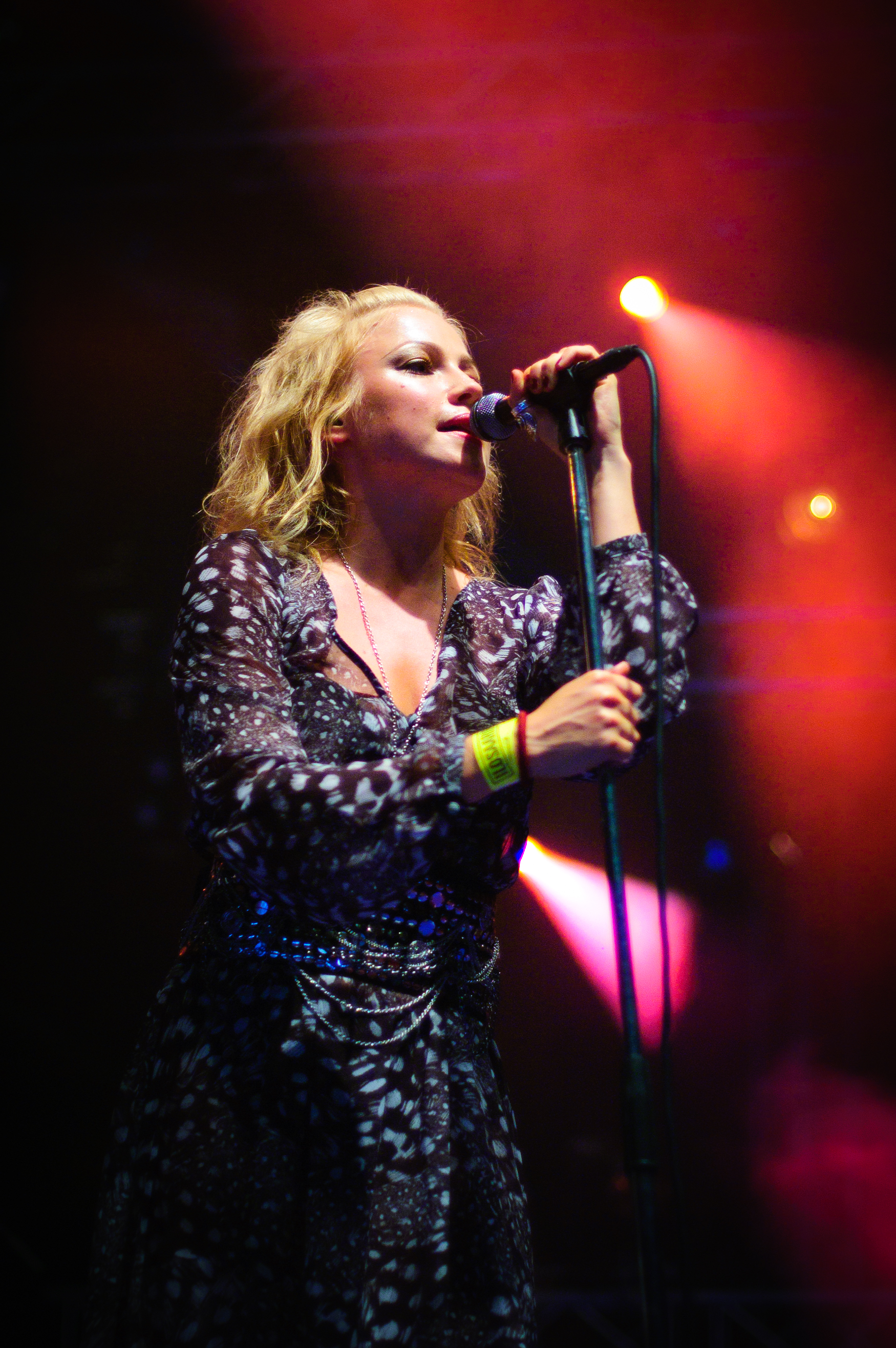
- Chisu at the 2010 Ilosaarirock festival

Background information
- Also known as: Chisu
- Born: Christel Martina Sundberg; 3 January 1982 (age 44); Helsinki, Finland
- Genre: Pop
- Label: HMC

Christel Martina Roosberg (née Sundberg; born 3 January 1982), known by her stage name Chisu (Finnish pronunciation: [ˈkisu]), is a Finnish pop artist, songwriter, and producer.

She wrote her first single, "Mun koti ei oo täällä", to the soundtrack of the 2007 film Sooloilua. The song was a hit in Finland in early 2008, peaking at number one on both the Singles Chart and the Downloads Chart and spending seven and nine weeks atop, respectively. She released her second album Vapaa ja yksin in 2009.

Her third album, Kun valaistun, was released in 2011 through Warner Music Finland. It was met with significant commercial success and became one of the best-selling albums of all time in Finland by a Finnish artist, selling approximately 95,000 copies. The album went on to win Best Album and Best Pop Album at the 2012 Emma-gaala, Finland's most prestigious music awards ceremony. Another version of the album, Kun valaistun 2.0, was released in 2012.

Her fourth album, Polaris, was released in 2015. Her fifth album, MOMENTUM 123, was released in 2019. In 2022, she announced an indefinite hiatus from music.

Chisu, who was born in Helsinki, has written songs for Antti Tuisku, Tarja Turunen, Jippu, Kristiina Brask and Kristiina Wheeler. During her career, Chisu has sold over 230,000 certified records, which places her among the top 80 best-selling artists in Finland.

In November 2012, Chisu was connected to a copyright controversy in Finland when a nine-year-old girl's home was raided by the police and had her laptop confiscated due to allegedly downloading Chisu songs. The controversy was named Chisugate by media. It has been alleged that the files the little girl downloaded and later shared, were bogus files disguised as the Chisu album and therefore she did not share Chisu's music.

In May 2025, Chisu's composition Ich Komme performed by Erika Vikman represented Finland in the Eurovision Song Contest 2025, where it finished 11th in the grand final with 196 points.

== Personal life ==
Chisu married producer Jori Sjöroos on 28 September 2019. After the marriage, Chisu changed her last name to Roosberg, combining her husband's last name Sjöroos and her last name Sundberg.

== Discography ==
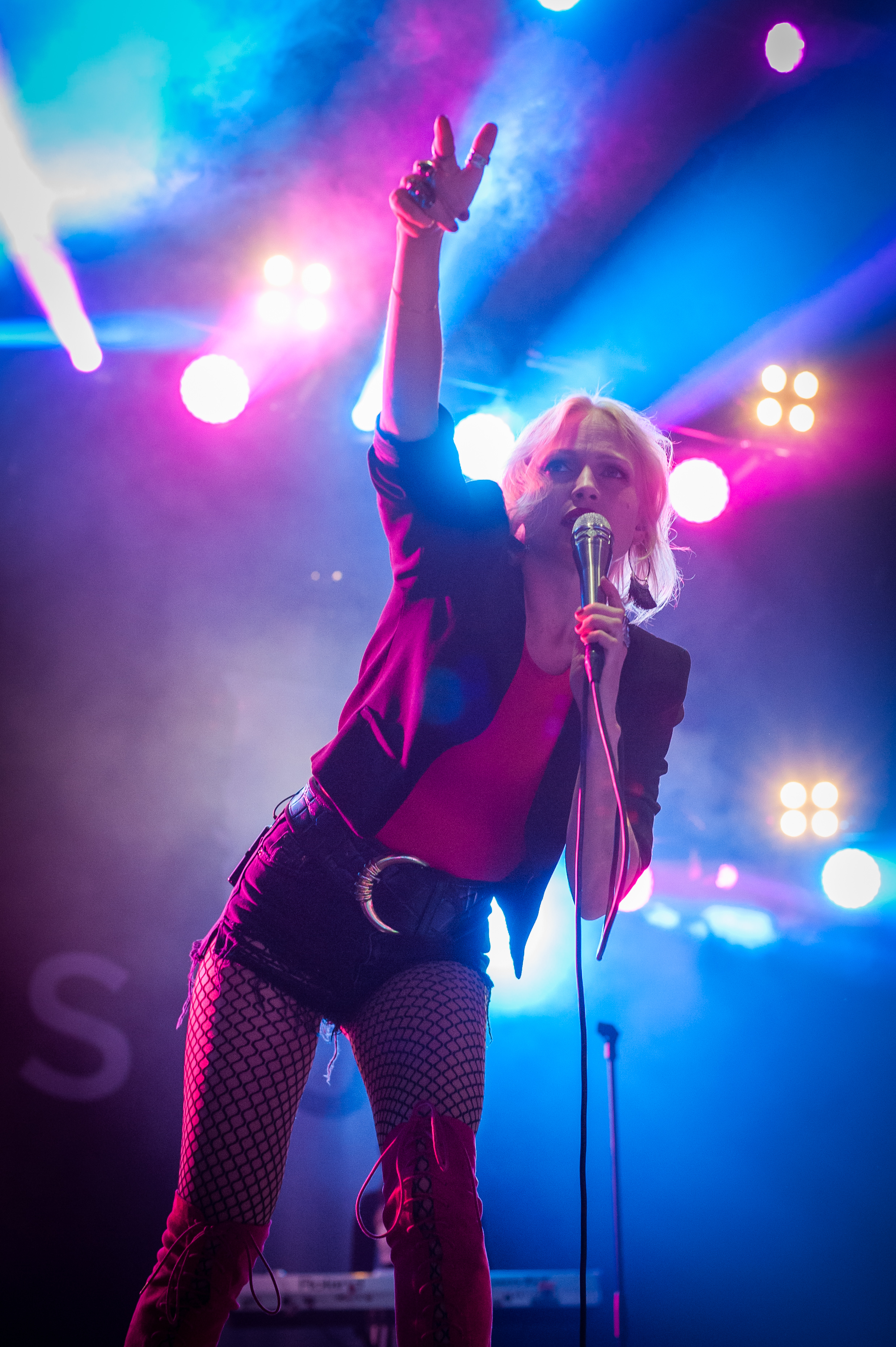
Chisu performing at the Ilosaarirock festival in Joensuu, Finland in 2016.

=== Albums ===
Title	Details	Peak position	Certification
Title	Details	FIN	Certification
Alkovi	Release date: 27 February 2008; Record label: HMC; Format: CD / Digital	5	Gold
Vapaa ja yksin	Release date: 23 September 2009; Record label: HMC / WEA; Format: CD / Digital / Vinyl	1	Double platinum
Kun valaistun	Release date: 5 October 2011; Record label: HMC / WEA; Format: CD / Digital	1	Multiple platinum
Kun valaistun 2.0	Release date: 6 June 2012; Record label: HMC / WEA; Format: CD-DVD-Blu-ray / Digital / Vinyl	2	
Polaris	Release date: 2 October 2015; Record label: HMC / WEA; Format: CD / Digital / Vinyl	2	
Momentum 123	Release date: 24 May 2019; Record label: Warner Music Finland; Format: CD / Digital / Vinyl	34	

=== Extended plays ===
- Post Momentum (2019)

=== Singles ===
Title	Year	Peak position	Certification	Album
Title	Year	FIN	Certification	Album
"Mun koti ei oo täällä"	2007	1	Gold	Alkovi
"Muut"	2008	—		Alkovi
"Tämä rakkaus"	2008	—		Alkovi
"Baden-Baden"	2009	3	Platinum	Vapaa ja yksin
"Kerrasta poikki"	2009	12		Vapaa ja yksin
"Sama nainen"	2009	5	Gold	Vapaa ja yksin
"Miehistä viis"	2010	—		Vapaa ja yksin
"Saaliit"	2010	—		Vapaa ja yksin
"Sabotage"	2011	1		Kun valaistun
"Kohtalon oma"	2011	1		Kun valaistun
"Tie"	2012	9		Kun valaistun
"Kolmas pyörä"	2012	—		Kun valaistun
"Frankenstein"	2012	—		Kun valaistun
"Ihana"	2015	—		Polaris
"Tuu mua vastaan"	2015	—		Polaris
"Tähdet"	2016	—		Polaris
"Polte"	2016	2		
"Älä herätä mua unesta"	2016	18		
"Ei riidellä enää"	2017	—		
"I Walk the Line"	2018	—		
"Momentum"	2019	—		Momentum 123
"Artisti / Narsisti"	2019	—		Momentum 123
"Viimeiset tekstarit"	2019	—		Momentum 123
"Ikävä"	2019	—		Post Momentum
"Mysteeri"	2021	19		
"Mun kulta"	2022	—		

== See also ==
- List of best-selling music artists in Finland
