= Annikki Tähti =

Finnish singer and actress (1929–2017)

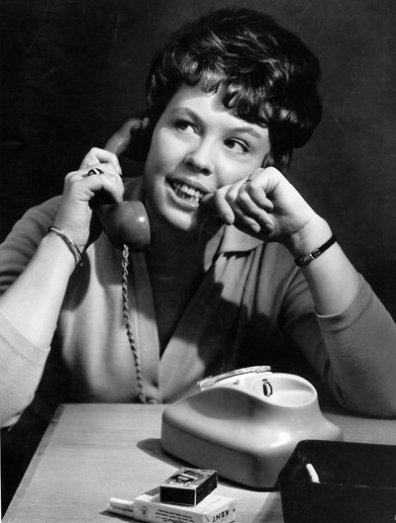
- Tähti in 1959

Background information
- Born: 5 December 1929; Helsinki, Finland
- Died: 19 June 2017 (aged 87) Vantaa, Finland
- Genres: Schlager
- Years active: 1953-2008
- Labels: Scandia

Annikki Tähti (in 1959–1978 Tähti-Tiensuu; 5 December 1929 – 19 June 2017) was a Finnish schlager singer, known for her wide repertoire ranging from waltz and tango to swing and Latin music, over a career lasting more than fifty years.

== Music career ==
Tähti's career began when a colleague arranged, behind her back, an audition with the composer and conductor George de Godzinsky in 1950. After a few years working together, with de Godzinsky coaching and preparing Tähti for a singing career, she signed a deal with the newly established Scandia record label.

Her breakthrough was a slow and nostalgic waltz, Muistatko Monrepos’n (lit. 'Remember Monrepos?'): released in 1955, it was the first gold record in Finland, and decades later remains the fourth-best-selling Finnish single of all time. It was originally intended only as the B-side to Tähti's hit single Pieni sydän, but became much more popular and was released in its own right.

Tähti followed this in quick succession with more hits, including the 1955 Balladi Olavinlinnasta (lit. 'Olavinlinna Ballad') and the 1956 Kuningaskobra (lit. 'King Cobra', Finnish version of Teddy Powell's 'Snake Charmer'), both of which were certified gold and are still among the best-selling Finnish singles, in 6th and 12th places, respectively.

The peak of her career was in the 1950s and 1960s, fading somewhat after that, although she enjoyed a slight resurgence in the late 1970s and early 1980s.

== Film career ==
Tähti's first film appearance was in the 1953 musical comedy Two Funny Guys, performing the song Onnen sävel, which also became her first published record and therefore launched her career as a recording artist.

Later she sang in Matti Kassila's 1959 short film Iskelmäkuvia, and in the 1960 musical film Iskelmäkaruselli pyörii.

More than forty years later, Tähti gained a new, younger audience, when she reprised her iconic Muistatko Monrepos’n in Aki Kaurismäki's 2002 film The Man Without a Past, as a Salvation Army flea market manager performing at a juhannus party for homeless people.

She also featured in numerous TV music programmes and documentaries between 1959 and 2009.

== Recognition ==
Tähti was awarded an honorary knighthood in the Order of the Lion of Finland.

In 1992, she received the City of Vantaa Cultural Award for her distinguished artistic career.

In 1998, she received a 'Special Emma' (Erikois-Emma) award.

In 2004, Tähti was included on the Suuret suomalaiset ('Great Finns') top-100 list compiled by Yle, at number 89. She was not originally nominated by the organisers, but received enough support in the public vote to make it to the list.

== Personal life ==
Originally from the Kallio district of Helsinki, Tähti lived for much of her adult life in the Martinlaakso area of Vantaa.

She was a private person, and in her own words "rather boring", who saw herself as a singer rather than a celebrity.

In 2008, Tähti suffered a stroke (cerebral infarction), after which she stopped performing and no longer appeared in public.

She had been married to conductor Pentti Tiensuu (m. 1959 — div. 1978), with whom she worked for many years. They had one child.

Tähti spent her last years largely alone in a care home, her husband and son having died earlier, and she having no siblings or other close family. She died virtually destitute, despite the enduring success of her music.

== See also ==
- Laila Kinnunen
