= Kunnes joet muuttaa suuntaa =

Studio album by Maija Vilkkumaa
- Released: April 19, 2010
- Genre: Pop rock
- Length: 44:20
- Label: Warner Music Finland, WEA

Maija Vilkkumaa chronology
Superpallo (2008)	Kunnes joet muuttaa suuntaa (2010)	Aja! (2015)

Singles from Kunnes joet muuttaa suuntaa
- 1. "Lottovoitto" Released: March 1, 2010; 2. "Dingo ja Yö" Released: July 18, 2010; 3. "Kuuraiset puut" Released: November 29, 2010

Kunnes joet muuttaa suuntaa (in English: Until Rivers Change Direction) is the sixth studio album by Finnish pop rock singer-songwriter Maija Vilkkumaa, released by Warner Music Finland and WEA in Finland on April 19, 2010. Debuting at number-one upon release on the Finnish Albums Chart and spending there 27 weeks in three runs up to 2011, the album has sold 16,000 copies to date, which has granted it a gold certification in Finland.

== Singles ==
During 2010, three singles were released from Kunnes joet muuttaa suuntaa, "Lottovoitto" on March 1, "Dingo ja Yö" on July 18 and "Kuuraiset puut" on November 29.

== Track listing ==
The (rough) English translations of the tracks are in the brackets.

No.	Title	Length
1.	"Rouvakellari" (Housewife Cellar)	3:45
2.	"Dingo ja Yö" (Dingo and Yö)	4:20
3.	"Lottovoitto" (Jackpot)	3:53
4.	"Rock 'n' Roll" (Rock 'n' Roll)	3:56
5.	"Kuuraiset puut" (Frosted Trees)	3:19
6.	"Viimeinen laulu" (The Last Song)	2:54
7.	"Siihenks se jää" (Does It End Here?)	4:34
8.	"Mistä tietää että on" (How Do You Know That You Are)	3:18
9.	"Jos se vie mun miehen" (If She Takes My Man)	2:30
10.	"Liperiin Nivalaan" (To Liperi, to Nivala)	4:32
11.	"Anteeksi" (I Am Sorry)	3:44
12.	"Rakkautta, vaatteet, ruokaa" (Love, Clothes, Food)	3:41

== Charts and certifications ==
=== Weekly charts ===
Chart (2010)	Peak position
Finnish Albums (Suomen virallinen lista)	1

=== Year-end charts ===
Chart (2010)	Position
Finnish Albums Chart	18

=== Certifications ===
Region	Certification	Certified units/sales
Finland (Musiikkituottajat)	Gold	16,691
