= Lottovoitto =

Single by Maija Vilkkumaa

from the album Kunnes joet muuttaa suuntaa
- Released: 1 March 2010
- Genre: Pop rock
- Length: 3:55
- Label: Warner Music Finland
- Songwriter(s): Maija Vilkkumaa

Maija Vilkkumaa singles chronology
"Mä haluun naimisiin" (2008)	"Lottovoitto" (2010)	"Dingo ja Yö" (2010)

"Lottovoitto" (in English: "Lottery Win") is a song by Finnish recording artist Maija Vilkkumaa, released by Warner Music Finland on 1 March 2010, as the first single from her sixth studio album Kunnes joet muuttaa suuntaa. Written and composed by Vilkkumaa, the song spent five weeks on the Finnish Singles Chart, peaking at number 15.

== Track listing and formats ==
- Digital download

No.	Title	Length
1.	"Lottovoitto"	3:55
