= Vapaa ja yksin =

Studio album by Chisu
- Released: September 23, 2009
- Genre: Pop
- Language: Finnish
- Label: Warner Music Finland

Chisu chronology
| Alkovi (2008) | Vapaa ja yksin (2009) | Kun valaistun (2011) |

Vapaa ja yksin (English: Free and Alone) is the second studio album by Finnish pop singer-songwriter Chisu. It was released by Warner Music in Finland on September 23, 2009, and it peaked at number one on the Finnish Albums Chart. To date, the album has sold double platinum in Finland with over 58,000 copies.

== Track listing ==
- Digital download

| No. | Title | Length |
|---|---|---|
| 1. | "Lähtö" (Departure) |
| 2. | "Miehistä viis!" (Forget Men!) |
| 3. | "Kerrasta poikki" (You Got One Shot) |
| 4. | "Baden-Baden" |
| 5. | "Sama nainen" (The Same Woman) |
| 6. | "Oi, muusa!" (Oh, Muse!) |
| 7. | "Etsijät" (The Seekers) |
| 8. | "Saaliit" (The Preys) |
| 9. | "Yksinäisen keijun tarina" (The Story of a Lonely Fairy) |
| 10. | "Vapaa ja yksin" (Free and Alone) |

== Charts and certifications ==
=== Charts ===
| Chart (2010) | Peak position |
|---|---|
| Finnish Albums Chart | 1 |

=== Certifications ===
| Region | Certification | Certified units/sales |
|---|---|---|
| Finland (Musiikkituottajat) | 2× Platinum | 58,684 |

=== Year-end charts ===
| Chart (2009) | Position |
|---|---|
| Finnish Albums Chart | 41 |
| Chart (2010) | Position |
| Finnish Albums Chart | 5 |
| Chart (2011) | Position |
| Finnish Albums Chart | 35 |

== See also ==
- List of number-one albums of 2010 (Finland)
