= Superpallo =

Studio album by Maija Vilkkumaa
- Released: 29 September 2008 (digital)
- Genre: Pop rock
- Length: 50:33
- Label: Warner Music Finland
- Producer: Riku Mattila

Maija Vilkkumaa chronology
Ilta Savoyssa (2007)	Superpallo (2008)	Kunnes joet muuttaa suuntaa (2010)

Singles from Superpallo
- 1. "Suojatiellä" Released: 16 June 2008; 2. "Luokkakokous" Released: 30 August 2008; 3. "Mä haluun naimisiin" Released: 22 December 2008

Superpallo (in English: Bouncy Ball) is the fifth studio album by Finnish pop rock singer-songwriter Maija Vilkkumaa, released by Warner Music in Finland digitally on 29 September 2008. The album debuted at number one upon release on the Finnish Albums Chart and charted for 16 weeks in two runs up to 2009. With sales of over 19,000 copies to date, the record has been awarded a gold certification in Finland.

== Singles ==
During 2008, three singles were released from Superpallo, "Suojatiellä" on 16 June, "Luokkakokous" on 30 August and "Mä haluun naimisiin" on 22 December.

== Track listing ==
No.	Title	Length
1.	"Monopolii" (Monopoly)	3:29
2.	"Luokkakokous" (Class Reunion)	4:24
3.	"Mä haluun naimisiin" (I Wanna Get Married)	4:15
4.	"Sut kuulen sut nään" (I Hear You, I See You)	4:24
5.	"Sirkus" (Circus)	3:52
6.	"Kuiskaile suu" (Keep Whispering, Mouth)	4:02
7.	"Sä kuolet" (You'll Die)	4:00
8.	"Ai miten valo sattuu" (Ouch, How the Light Is Aching)	4:55
9.	"Superpallo" (Bouncy Ball)	3:58
10.	"Suojatiellä" (On the Pedestrian Crossing)	4:20
11.	"Riemulla" (With Delight)	3:55
12.	"Yöllä" (At Night)	4:59

== Charts and certifications ==
=== Weekly charts ===
Chart (2008)	Peak position
Finnish Albums (Suomen virallinen lista)	1

=== Year-end charts ===
Chart (2008)	Position
Finnish Albums Chart	26

=== Certifications ===
Region	Certification	Certified units/sales
Finland (Musiikkituottajat)	Gold	19,264
