= Kun valaistun =

Album by Chisu

Studio album by Chisu
- Released: 5 October 2011
- Genre: Pop
- Length: 34:58
- Language: Finnish
- Label: Warner Music Finland

Chisu chronology
Vapaa ja yksin (2009)	Kun valaistun (2011)	Kun valaistun 2.0 (2012)

Singles from Kun valaistun
- 1. "Sabotage"; 2. "Kohtalon oma"

Kun valaistun (When I Become Enlightened) is the third studio album by Finnish pop singer-songwriter Chisu. It was released by Warner Music in Finland on 5 October 2011 and it debuted at number one on the Finnish Albums Chart.

== Track listing ==
- Digital download

No.	Title	Length
1.	"Minä ja mun pää" (Me and My Head)	5:40
2.	"Sabotage" (Sabotage)	4:02
3.	"Kohtalon oma" (Bound by Destiny)	3:50
4.	"Ennustus" (Prophecy)	3:21
5.	"Tie" (Road)	4:50
6.	"Veneretki" (Boat Trip)	3:03
7.	"Kriisit" (Crises)	3:20
8.	"Jos on valmis, ei sitä tartte kysyykään" (If You Are Ready, You Don't Have to Ask About It)	2:40
9.	"Vanha nuorena" (Old Already When You're Young)	4:06

== Charts and certifications ==
=== Weekly charts ===
Chart (2011)	Peak position
Finnish Albums Chart	1

=== Year-end charts ===
Chart (2011)	Position
Finnish Albums Chart	2

=== Certifications ===
Region	Certification	Certified units/sales
Finland (Musiikkituottajat)	4× Platinum	94,970

== Kun valaistun 2.0 ==
Kun valaistun 2.0

Studio album by Chisu
- Released: 6 June 2012
- Genre: Pop
- Language: Finnish
- Label: Warner Music Finland

Chisu chronology
Kun valaistun (2010)	Kun valaistun 2.0 (2012)

The album was rereleased on 6 June 2012 with 12 tracks, comprising the original 9 tracks of the 2011 album and addition of three more tracks, namely "Frankenstein", "Kolmas pyörä" and "Kun valaistun".

=== Track list ===
- "Minä ja mun pää"
- "Sabotage"
- "Kohtalon oma"
- "Ennustus"
- "Tie"
- "Veneretki"
- "Kriisit"
- "Jos on valmis, ei sitä tartte kysyykään"
- "Vanha jo nuorena"
- "Frankenstein"
- "Kolmas pyörä"
- "Kun valaistun"

== See also ==
- List of number-one albums of 2011 (Finland)
