= Pitkä ihana leikki =

Studio album by Maija Vilkkumaa
- Released: 23 August 1999; 22 May 2000 (Peltipainos)
- Genre: Pop rock
- Length: 44:27
- Label: Warner Music Finland

Maija Vilkkumaa chronology
Pitkä ihana leikki (1999)	Meikit, ketjut ja vyöt (2001)

Alternative cover
- Cover for the 2000 edition Pitkä ihana leikki – peltipainos

Singles from Pitkä ihana leikki
- 1. "Satumaa-tango"; 2. "Salaa"; 3. "Auringonpimennys"; 4. "Hiuksissa hiekkaa" 5. "Tähti"

Pitkä ihana leikki (in English: Long Sweet Game) is the debut album by Finnish pop rock singer-songwriter Maija Vilkkumaa, released by Warner Music in Finland on 23 August 1999. The songs are written and composed by Vilkkumaa.

Considered as a fresh new release on the Finnish pop rock scene by music critics, Pitkä ihana leikki was favorably critiqued for its imaginative lyrical content for which Vilkkumaa, according to her, partially got the inspiration from the 1980s Finnish rock band Dingo. The album debuted at number 12 on the Finnish Albums Chart, peaking third the next week, then going variably down spending there 29 weeks. Pitkä ihana leikki has sold over 38,000 copies to date in Finland, which has granted it a gold certification. In 2000, Vilkkumaa re-released the album under the title Pitkä ihana leikki – peltipainos ("Sheet Metal Edition"), with one extra song, "Peltirumpu".

== Singles ==
Five singles were released from the album.

- "Satumaa-tango" ("Satumaa Tango")
- "Salaa" ("Secretly")
- "Auringonpimennys" ("Solar Eclipse")
- "Hiuksissa hiekkaa" ("Sand in the Hair")
- "Tähti" ("Star")

== Critical reception ==
Pitkä ihana leikki was well received by music critics that thought it fulfilled the expectations set by its lead single "Satumaa-tango" played in early 1999. On the August 1999 volume of Finnish rock magazine Soundi, Jorma Jortikka gave the album four out of five stars, complimenting the album for "inventive melodies and perceptive lyrics", though recognizing "a few clumsy metaphors". He praised Pitkä ihana leikki for its "credibility", "overwhelming cheerfulness" and lack of aspirations for being overly artistic.

Likewise, Roope Lehtinen from City magazine gave the album four out of five stars. Noting the album's "strong lean on Dingo's tradition", Lehtinen praised the structures of the songs for "sense of drama", "catchy choruses" and "schlager-ish suppleness". Differing from Dingo's "metaphorical mazes", the lyrics are "sensible and brisk". Furthermore, Lehtinen credits the album for "outstanding self-irony" and "themes and narrators changing throughout the album" that make it stand out from average Finnish "self-centered" pop. However, he notes the album's own one-size-fits-all nature that manages to "please all listeners". Summing up the downsides of the "well-produced" record, he considers "Timantti" and "Salaa" "idle" and "Vähän ennen" too dance-ish.

Antti J. Ravelin from Allmusic gave a positive review of the album saying Vilkkumaa's first live performances and "Satumaa-tango" "promised a lot" and that the new artist emerging in the then-sparse scene of Finnish female singer-songwriters "also relied on rock, and so her hybrid sound was extremely interesting", adding that "naïve lyrics, pop elements, and sometimes rather annoying vocals aren't bothersome". Also complimenting the musical arrangements by Janne Lehto, he considered Pitkä ihana leikki one of the best Finnish albums of 1999.

== Track listing ==
=== Standard edition ===
- Digital download

No.	Title	Length
1.	"Ärsyttävä tapa" (Annoying Habit)	3:38
2.	"Auringonpimennys" (Solar Eclipse)	3:51
3.	"Satumaa-tango" (Satumaa Tango)	4:51
4.	"Hiuksissa hiekkaa" (Sand in the Hair)	3:35
5.	"Ystävä" (Friend)	3:16
6.	"Ei ikinä sun" (Never Yours)	3:14
7.	"Jäässä" (Frozen)	4:43
8.	"Timantti" (Diamond)	3:31
9.	"Salaa" (Secretly)	3:20
10.	"Tyyny" (Pillow)	3:26
11.	"Vähän ennen" (A Bit Earlier)	3:42
12.	"Tähti" (Star)	3:20

=== Pitkä ihana leikki – peltipainos ===
Disc 1
No.	Title	Length
1.	"Ärsyttävä tapa" (Annoying Habit)	3:38
2.	"Auringonpimennys" (Solar Eclipse)	3:51
3.	"Satumaa-tango" (Satumaa Tango)	4:51
4.	"Hiuksissa hiekkaa" (Sand in the Hair)	3:35
5.	"Ystävä" (Friend)	3:16
6.	"Ei ikinä sun" (Never Yours)	3:14
7.	"Jäässä" (Frozen)	4:43
8.	"Timantti" (Diamond)	3:31
9.	"Salaa" (Secretly)	3:20
10.	"Tyyny" (Pillow)	3:26
11.	"Vähän ennen" (A Bit Earlier)	3:42
12.	"Tähti" (Star)	3:20

Bonus tracks
No.	Title	Length
13.	"Peltirumpu" (Sheet Metal Drum)	3:30

== Charts and certifications ==
=== Weekly charts ===
Chart (1999)	Peak position
Finnish Albums (Suomen virallinen lista)	3
Chart (2000)	Peak position
Finnish Albums (Suomen virallinen lista)	29

=== Year-end charts ===
Chart (2000)	Position
Finnish Albums Chart	275

=== Certifications ===
Region	Certification	Certified units/sales
Finland (Musiikkituottajat)	Gold	38,406
