= Romanians in Finland =

Total population
- 5,628

Regions with significant populations
- Helsinki, Turku, Espoo, Vantaa, Mariehamn

Languages
- Finnish · Romanian · Swedish

Religion
- Christianity

Related ethnic groups
- Romanians in Germany

Romanians in Finland (Finnish: Suomen romanialaiset) are immigrants from Romania residing in Finland.

== Migration ==
Eastern European Roma started arriving in Finland in 2007, when Romania and Bulgaria joined the EU. Many of the Romanian Roma in the Helsinki region are from Valea Seacă. Most of them beg and sell the Iso Numero magazine.

== Employment ==
Roughly 200 Romanians and Bulgarians are in the police force in Helsinki.

== Demographics ==
1.64% speak Finnish, 0.47% speak Swedish and the rest 97.89% speak other languages.

=== Distribution ===
The regions with the most Romanians are Uusimaa (2,019, 0.12%), Southwest Finland (784, 0.16%) and Åland (478, 1.60%).

Romanians by Municipality in 2018
No.	Municipality	Romanians	%
1.	Helsinki	737	0.11
2.	Turku	513	0.27
3.	Espoo	507	0.18
4.	Vantaa	396	0.17
5.	Mariehamn	220	1.87
6.	Pori	177	0.21

== Notable people ==
- Tomi Petrescu, football player
- George de Godzinsky, composer and conductor
- Maria Lund, actress and singer-songwriter
- Veera Florica Rajala, lawyer and candidate in Helsinki municipal elections 2021

== See also ==
- Finland–Romania relations
- Romanian diaspora
- Immigration to Finland
