= Meikit, ketjut ja vyöt =

Studio album by Maija Vilkkumaa
- Released: 9 April 2001 (CD); 16 June 2008 (digital)
- Genre: pop rock
- Length: 43:36
- Label: Warner Music Finland

Maija Vilkkumaa chronology
Pitkä ihana leikki (1999)	Meikit, ketjut ja vyöt (2001)	Ei (2003)

Singles from Meikit, ketjut ja vyöt
- 1. "Noinko vaikeeta se on?" 2. "Ingalsin Laura"; 3. "Totuutta ja tehtävää" 4. "Prinsessa Jää"

Meikit, ketjut ja vyöt (Make-up, Necklaces and Belts) is the second studio album by Finnish pop rock singer-songwriter Maija Vilkkumaa. Released by Warner Music in Finland physically on 9 April 2001, and digitally on 16 June 2008, the album debuted at number one on the Finnish Albums Chart, maintaining the peak three weeks and spending 26 weeks on the chart. Meikit, ketjut ja vyöt has sold over 36,000 copies to date in Finland, which has granted it a platinum certification.

== Singles ==
The (rough) English translations of the tracks are in the brackets.

- "Noinko vaikeeta se on?" ("Is It That Hard?", promotional)
- "Ingalsin Laura" ("Laura Ingals [sic] [Wilder]")
- "Totuutta ja tehtävää" ("Truth and Dare")
- "Prinsessa Jää" ("Princess Ice")

== Track listing ==
- Digital download

No.	Title	Length
1.	"Prinsessa Jää" (Princess Ice)	3:47
2.	"Noinko vaikeeta se on?" (Is It That Hard?)	3:40
3.	"Teen mitä vaan" (I'll Do Anything)	4:00
4.	"Rikkinäinen sähikäinen" (Broken Firecracker)	2:46
5.	"Totuutta ja tehtävää" (Truth and Dare)	4:02
6.	"Sä et tiedä mitään" (You Know Nothing)	2:55
7.	"Ilosanoma" (Gospel)	3:44
8.	"Se pistää ajoittain itkemään" (At Times It Makes You Cry)	3:37
9.	"Ingalsin Laura" (Laura Ingals [sic] [Wilder])	3:19
10.	"Suomen neito" (Maiden of Finland)	3:44
11.	"Yksin huudat sun yöt" (You're Crying Alone At Nights)	4:28
12.	"Kristallitiara" (Crystal Tiara)	3:34

== Charts and certifications ==
=== Weekly charts ===
Chart (2001)	Peak position
Finnish Albums (Suomen virallinen lista)	1

=== Year-end charts ===
Chart (2001)	Position
Finnish Albums (Suomen virallinen lista)	19

=== Certifications ===
Region	Certification	Certified units/sales
Finland (Musiikkituottajat)	Platinum	36,983
