= Suojatiellä =

Single by Maija Vilkkumaa

from the album Superpallo
- Released: 13 June 2008 (radio); 16 June 2008 (digital)
- Genre: Pop rock
- Length: 4:20
- Label: Warner Music Finland
- Songwriter(s): Maija Vilkkumaa

Maija Vilkkumaa singles chronology
"Hei tie" (2006)	"Suojatiellä" (2008)	"Luokkakokous" (2008)

"Suojatiellä" (in English, "On the Pedestrian Crossing") is a song by Finnish recording artist Maija Vilkkumaa, released by Warner Music Finland for airplay on 13 June 2008, and digitally on 16 June, as the first single from her fifth studio album Superpallo. Written by Vilkkumaa, the song spent two weeks on the Finnish Singles Chart, peaking at number 10 on the debut week.

== Track listing and formats ==
- Digital download

No.	Title	Length
1.	"Suojatiellä"	4:20
