= Ei (album) =

Studio album by Maija Vilkkumaa
- Released: 7 March 2003
- Genre: Rock
- Length: 50:55
- Label: Warner Music Finland

Maija Vilkkumaa chronology
Meikit, ketjut ja vyöt (2001)	Ei (2003)	Se ei olekaan niin (2005)

Singles from Ei
- 1. "Ei"; 2. "Mun elämä" 3. "Ei saa surettaa"

Ei (English: No) is the third studio album by Finnish pop rock singer-songwriter Maija Vilkkumaa. Released by Warner Music in Finland on 7 March 2003, the album debuted at number one on Finnish Albums Chart, maintaining the peak position for two weeks and charted for 56 weeks altogether. Ei was the third-best-selling album of 2003 in Finland and, with sales of over 120,000 copies to date, has received a quadruple-platinum certification in the country. Ei ranks also 38th on the list of the best-selling albums of all time in Finland.

== Background ==
Prior to the release, Maija visited New York City to spend time relaxing and writing new songs.

== Singles ==
The (rough) English translations of the tracks are in the brackets.

- "Ei" (No)
- "Mun elämä" (My Life)
- "Ei saa surettaa" (You Shouldn't Feel Sad)

== Track listing ==
The (rough) English translations of the tracks are in the brackets.

All tracks are written by Maija Vilkkumaa.

No.	Title	Length
1.	"Kristiina"	3:26
2.	"Mun elämä" (My Life)	4:33
3.	"Väärin" (Wrong)	3:09
4.	"Ei" (No)	3:18
5.	"Häviän" (I lose/ I fade away/ I vanish)	4:12
6.	"Eteiseen" (Into the Hallway (literal) On the hallway floor (contextual))	3:52
7.	"Ei susta huomaa" (Can't be seen in you)	5:11
8.	"Lattiaa pestään" (Floor Is Getting Washed)	3:30
9.	"Mä jään" (I'll stay)	4:13
10.	"Kusipää" (Asshole/ Fuckhead)	5:18
11.	"Jonain päivänä" (At someday)	4:00
12.	"Ei saa surettaa" (Shouldn't be saddened/ Shouldn't sadden)	6:13

== Charts and certifications ==
=== Weekly charts ===
Chart (2003)	Peak position
Finnish Albums (Suomen virallinen lista)	1

=== Year-end charts ===
Chart (2003)	Position
Finnish Albums (Suomen virallinen lista)	3
Chart (2004)	Position
Finnish Albums (Suomen virallinen lista)	28

=== Certifications ===
Region	Certification	Certified units/sales
Finland (Musiikkituottajat)	4× Platinum	120,767

== See also ==
- List of best-selling albums in Finland
