= Henry Theel =

Finnish singer (1917–1989)

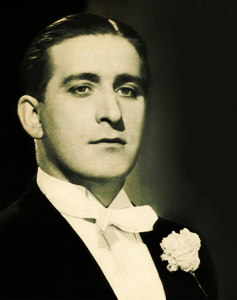
Henry Theel on an unspecified date.

Henry Per-Erik Theel (November 14, 1917 – December 19, 1989), also known by his pseudonym Heikki Hovi, was one of the most prominent Finnish singers during the 1940s and the 1950s, though he continued to perform until the late 1980s. His most famous songs are inclusive of "Syyspihlajan alla", "Liljankukka" ("Lily Flower"), "Hiljaa soivat balalaikat" and "Satumaa" ("Fairyland"). Theel has participated in more than five-hundred songs and roles throughout his career. Theel also performed as an actor in at least five films.

Henry Theel was born on November 14, 1917, to a Finnish-Swedish family in Helsinki, but spent his youth in Oulu. The paternal side of his family can be traced back to Belgium. In the beginning singing was only a hobby for Theel, but then in 1942 he made his first recording session featuring the song "Syyspihlajan alla". In the year of 1945, Theel began to perform songs of Toivo Kärki and he had already in 1950 made over two-hundred-fifty recordings. Between 1946 and 1952 Theel and Kärki toured Finland and at the same time Theel's interpretation and overall performance of "Punainen mylly" became very successful. Theel continued to make recordings in the 1950s, however he was forced to take a longer break when his vocal cords were damaged. This injury prevented him from singing for some time altogether.

Theel returned with his recordings in the early 1960s. The greatest successes of Theel became "Sellanen ol 'Viipuri", "Syysillan Tuuli", "Tangokavaljeeri" and "Rattaanpyörä". After this Theel made some recordings with Humppa-Veikkot. Theel continued recording until his death, and by that time he had made over five-hundred individual recordings. Theel had sung in Finnish, Swedish, Italian and Spanish. Notable songs that Theel sang in Swedish are as follows: "Kan du vissla Johanna?" ("Can you whistle Johanna?"), "Vintergatan" ("Milky Way") and "Min älskling" ("My darling").

Theel died at the age of seventy-two on December 19, 1989, in Helsinki, Uusimaa, Finland. Theel is buried beside his wife, Svea Dorothea Ahlberg (March 17, 1913 – August 25, 1970), within the Hietaniemi Cemetery in Helsinki, Finland.

== Discography ==
=== Albums ===
- Henry Theel tänään (1970, Finnlevy)
- Kulkurin kaiho (1972, Finnlevy)
- Tatjaana tanssii (1975, PSO)
- Kultainen nuoruus (1976, PSO)
- Stadin kundi (1976, PSO)
- Henry Theel (1977, PSO)
- Henry Theel sjunger på svenska (1977, PSO)
- Oloneuvos (1978, PSO)
- Onnemme aika (1980, PSO)
- Tiritomba (1982, Levytuottajat)
- Liljankukka (1983, Finnlevy)

=== Collections ===
- Henry Theel (1968, Finnlevy)
- Henry Theel 2 (1972, Finnlevy)
- Orpopojan valssi (1975, Fonovox)
- Unohtumattomat (1978, Finnlevy)
- Henry Theel laulaa (1982, Finnlevy)
- Henry Theel 1917−1989 (2-LP, 1991, Finnlevy)
- Henry Theel − Unohtumattomat 1 (1993, Fazer Finnlevy)
- Henry Theel − Unohtumattomat 2 (1994, Fazer Finnlevy)
- 20 suosikkia − Liljankukka (1999, Warner Music)
- Eron hetki on kaunis (2002)
- Jokaiselle jotakin (2007)
- Kotimaan sävel (2008)
- Kyyneleitä (2010)

== Filmography ==
- Serenaadiluutnantti (1949) as Kalle Oinas
- Köyhä laulaja (1950) as Mr. Harju
- Vain laulajapoikia (1951) as Ensilaulaja
- Lännen lokarin veli (1952) as Jaska Mäki
- Kokemäen Uunon kaupunkimatka (1961, TV Movie) (final film role)
