= George de Godzinsky =

Composer (1914-1994)

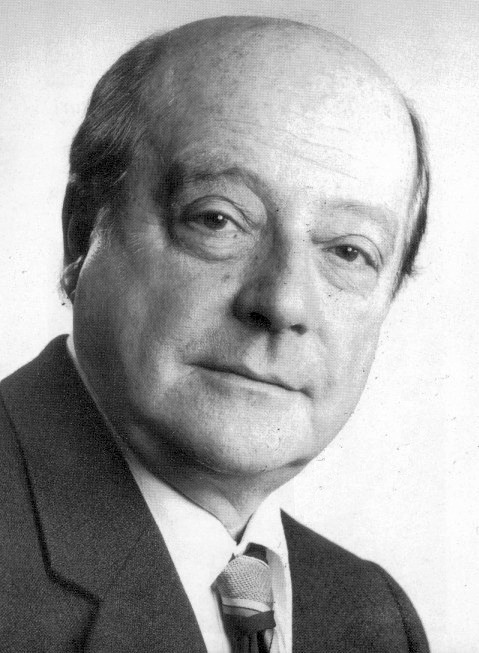
- George de Godzinsky c. 1960
- Born: 5 July 1914; Saint Petersburg, Russian Empire
- Died: 23 May 1994 (aged 79); Helsinki, Finland
- Occupations: Composer, pianist, conductor
- Era: 20th century

George de Godzinsky (5 July 1914 – 23 May 1994) was a Finnish composer, pianist and conductor. He is known for his Schlager music, his film scores, and his work as a conductor at major theatres in Finland and Sweden. He also composed music for operettas and movies, and conducted the Finnish entries for the Eurovision Song Contest between 1961 and 1965. He was the first representative of popular music to be awarded the title of professor in Finland.

== Biography ==
=== Early life ===
De Godzinsky was born in Saint Petersburg, Russian Empire. He was of Polish, Czech, Ukrainian and Romanian ancestry through his father, Franciszek de Godzinsky, and of Dutch and Swiss descent through his mother, Maria Othmar-Neuscheller.

Franciszek de Godzinsky was a civil servant and businessman in Saint Petersburg with strong commercial ties to Finland. In 1920 the family fled across the frozen Lake Ladoga to Finland, eventually settling in the Brunnsparken district of Helsinki.

=== Career ===
Between 1931 and 1937 de Godzinsky attended the Helsinki Conservatory. In 1935–36 he joined, as accompanist, the opera singer Feodor Chaliapin on his Far East tour, performing together in fifty-seven concerts in Manchuria, China and Japan. He subsequently built a career as chief conductor at a number of prominent Scandinavian theatres, including the Swedish Theatre, Helsinki, the Royal Dramatic Theatre, Stockholm, and the Gothenburg City Theatre, Gothenburg. The tours of the Finnish National Opera to the United States, Bergen, Norway, Warsaw, Poland and Paris, France, pursued between 1959 and 1965, proved to be some of de Godzinsky's career highlights. Between 1961 and 1965, he conducted the Finnish entries for the Eurovision Song Contest. He is also known as the long-term conductor of the vocal quartet Kipparikvartetti.

After the Continuation War, de Godzinsky was engaged by Suomen Filmiteollisuus (SF, Finnish Film Industry) as a film composer and studio conductor. He composed music for 64 films for the company, which was led by Toivo Särkkä.

De Godzinsky's most significant and enduring post was as conductor of the Finnish Broadcasting Company's entertainment orchestra, a position he took up at the personal invitation of conductor Nils-Eric Fougstedt. Through this role he played a central part in shaping popular music in Finland, conducting the orchestra until 1966 and remaining with the Broadcasting Company until his retirement in 1980.

=== Recognition ===
In 1981 de Godzinsky received a state prize for his contributions to Finnish music. In 1985 he was awarded the title of professor — the first representative of popular music in Finland to receive this distinction. In 1990 the state of Vienna awarded him a silver medal for his work in Finland on behalf of Austrian culture. In 1991 he received a Jussi Award for his contributions to Finnish film.
