= Kipparikvartetti =

Finnish vocal group

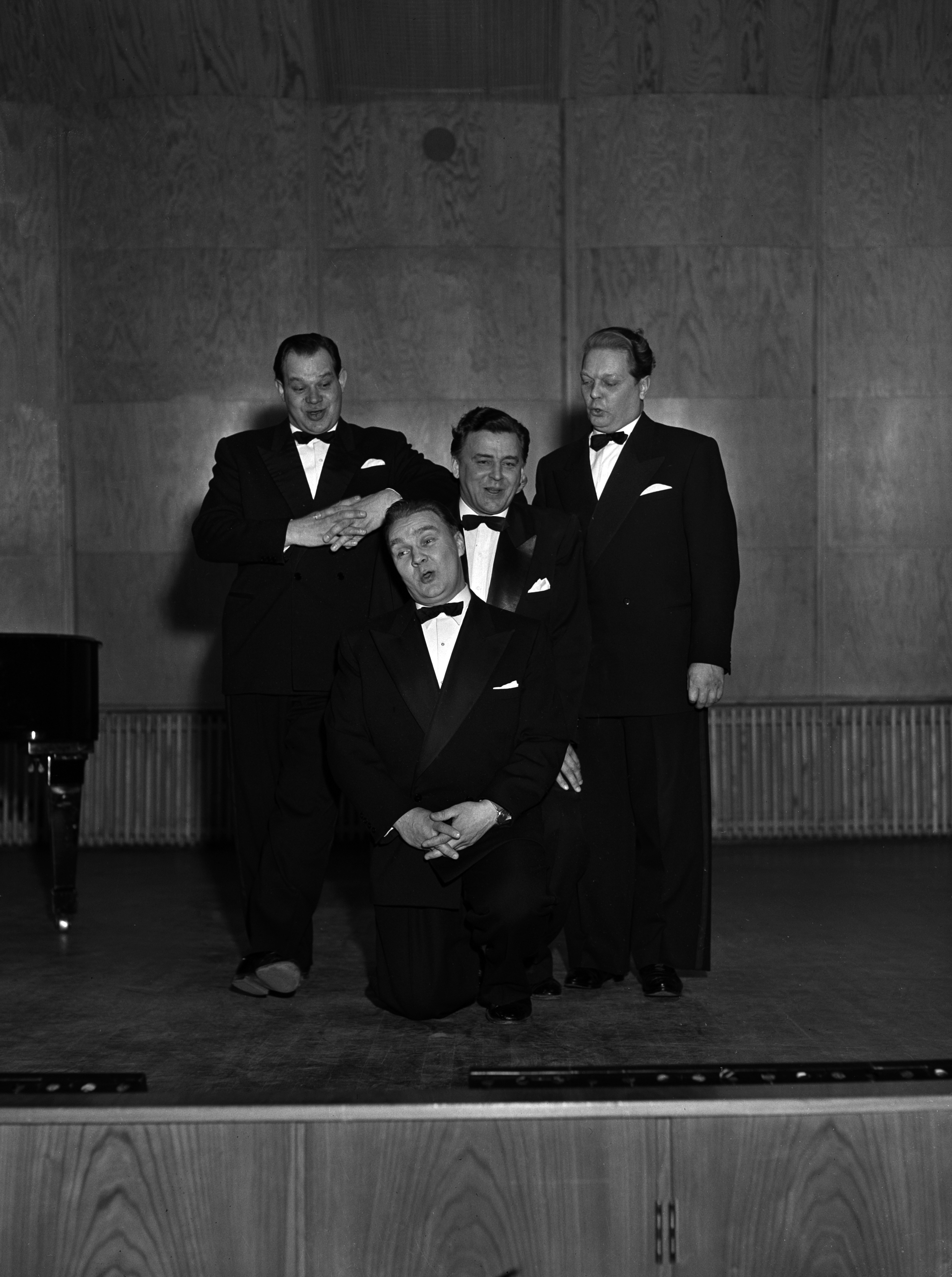
Kipparikvartetti, 1952 (Auvo Nuotio, Olavi Virta, Teijo Joutsela, Kauko Käyhkö)

Kipparikvartetti (literally "skipper quartet") was a Finnish vocal group (quartet) initially put together by Harry Bergström that existed during 1951–1983.

== History ==
The quartet was first brought together for the 1950 musical comedy film Beautiful Veera to voice the singing crew of a steamboat, under the direction of Bergström. Only Olavi Virta was seen on screen; Teijo Joutsela, Auvo Nuotio and Kauko Käyhkö only lent their voices. Due to the film's success Bergström formed a real quartet that debuted the following year.

Until 1955 the group's conductor was Bergström, succeeded by George de Godzinsky.

There was a 1952 comedy musical film Kipparikvartetti directed by Ville Salminen about the fictional adventures of the group, with the members playing fictionalized versions of themselves.

== Members ==
- First Tenor - Auvo Nuotio (1950–1983)
- Second tenor - Olavi Virta (1950–1953)
- Second tenor - Eero Väre (1953–1972)
- Second tenor - Kalevi Vallineva (1951, 1972–1983)
- First bass - Teijo Joutsela (1950–1983)
- Second bass - Kauko Käyhkö (1950–1983)
- Second bass - Pentti Tuominen (replaced Käyhkö several times)
- Second bass - Ami Lovén (replaced Käyhkö several times during 1970–1983)
