= Se ei olekaan niin =

Studio album by Maija Vilkkumaa
- Released: 11 July 2005
- Genre: Pop rock
- Length: 49:41
- Label: Warner Music Finland

Maija Vilkkumaa chronology
Ei (2003)	Se ei olekaan niin (2005)	Totuutta ja tehtävää (2006)

Singles from Se ei olekaan niin
- 1. "Se ei olekaan niin" 2. "Kesä"; 3. "Liian kauan"

Se ei olekaan niin (in English: But It's Not Like That) is the fourth studio album by Finnish pop rock singer-songwriter Maija Vilkkumaa. Released by Warner Music in Finland on 11 July 2005, it debuted at number one the Finnish Albums Chart and charted for 26 weeks. The album has sold over 47,000 copies to date in Finland, which has granted it a platinum certification.

== Singles ==
The (rough) English translations of the tracks are in the brackets.

- "Se ei olekaan niin" (But It's Not Like That)
- "Kesä" (Summer)
- "Liian kauan" (Too long)

== Track listing ==
The (rough) English translations of the tracks are in the brackets.

- Digital download

No.	Title	Composer	Length
1.	"Kesä" (Summer)	Maija Vilkkumaa	3:53
2.	"Auta mua" (Help Me)	Maija Vilkkumaa	3:52
3.	"Se ei olekaan niin" (But It's Not Like That)	Maija Vilkkumaa	4:23
4.	"Metsästäjä" (Hunter)	Maija Vilkkumaa	4:34
5.	"Lastenhoitaja" (Babysitter / Nanny)	Maija Vilkkumaa	3:59
6.	"Niin kuin muutkin" (Just Like the Others)	Maija Vilkkumaa	3:36
7.	"Mä haluan" (I Want)	Maija Vilkkumaa	3:19
8.	"Katu" (Street)	Maija Vilkkumaa	3:31
9.	"Liian kauan" (Too Long)	Maija Vilkkumaa	3:51
10.	"Yksi" (The One)	Maija Vilkkumaa	4:06
11.	"Ainakin puolet" (At Least a Half of It)	Maija Vilkkumaa	5:48
12.	"Puisto puhuu" (The Park Is Talking)	Maija Vilkkumaa	4:49

== Charts and certifications ==
=== Weekly charts ===
Chart (2005)	Peak position
Finnish Albums (Suomen virallinen lista)	1

=== Year-end charts ===
Chart (2005)	Position
Finnish Albums Chart	6

=== Certifications ===
Region	Certification	Certified units/sales
Finland (Musiikkituottajat)	Platinum	47,160
