= Tea Hiilloste =

Finnish singer and television presenter

- Hiilloste in 2007

Background information
- Also known as: Tea
- Born: Tea Marika Hiilloste; 31 October 1982 (age 43); Hämeenkoski, Finland
- Origin: Finland
- Genre: Pop
- Years active: 2002-present
- Labels: Capitol, EMI
- Website: Official website

Tea Hiilloste (born 31 October 1982 in Hämeenkoski) is a Finnish singer and television presenter. She was a member of girl group Jane and she has started a solo career after the group disbanded. Her 2007 single "Tytöt tykkää" peaked at number one in Finnish Singles Chart.

== Discography ==
=== Albums ===
- 2007 - Tytöt tykkää
- 2008 - Hey C'mon!
- 2013 - Mehudisko

=== Singles ===
- 2007- "Tytöt tykkää"
- 2007 - Tontut tykkää
- 2008 - C'mon C'mon (feat. Remu Aaltonen)
- 2010 - Auringonlaskuun (feat. Stig Dogg)
- 2013 - Sormista sakset

=== Promotional ===
- 2007 - Puhu mun kädelle
- 2008 - Tea-4-2

=== Other songs ===
- 2007 - Moi Me Bailataan (feat. Skidit)
- 2011 - Mehudisco (feat. Kana)
