= Ei (song) =

Single by Maija Vilkkumaa

from the album Totuutta ja tehtävää
- A-side: "Häviän"
- B-side: "Ilosanoma"
- Released: 2003
- Genre: Pop rock
- Length: 3:18
- Label: Warner Music Finland
- Songwriter: Maija Vilkkumaa

Maija Vilkkumaa singles chronology
"Prinsessa Jää" (2001)	"Ei" (2003)	"Mun elämä" (2003)

"Ei" (English: No) is a song by Finnish pop rock singer-songwriter Maija Vilkkumaa. Released by Warner Music Finland in 2003, it was the B-side to her lead single "Häviän" (I Vanish) from her third studio album Ei, along with the other B-side "Ilosanoma" (Gospel). Written by Vilkkumaa, the song peaked at number three on its debut week on the Finnish Singles Chart and charted for five weeks.

== Track listing ==
All tracks are written by Maija Vilkkumaa

No.	Title	Arrangement	Length
1.	"Häviän"	Niko Kokko, Mikko Kosonen, Tero Pennanen, Jan Pethman, Maija Vilkkumaa	4:13
2.	"Ei"	Niko Kokko, Mikko Kosonen, Tero Pennanen, Jan Pethman, Maija Vilkkumaa	3:18
3.	"Ilosanoma"	Niko Kokko, Mikko Kosonen, Tero Pennanen, Jan Pethman, Maija Vilkkumaa	3:32

== Chart performance ==
Chart (2010)	Peak position
Finnish Singles Chart	3
