= Kauko Käyhkö =

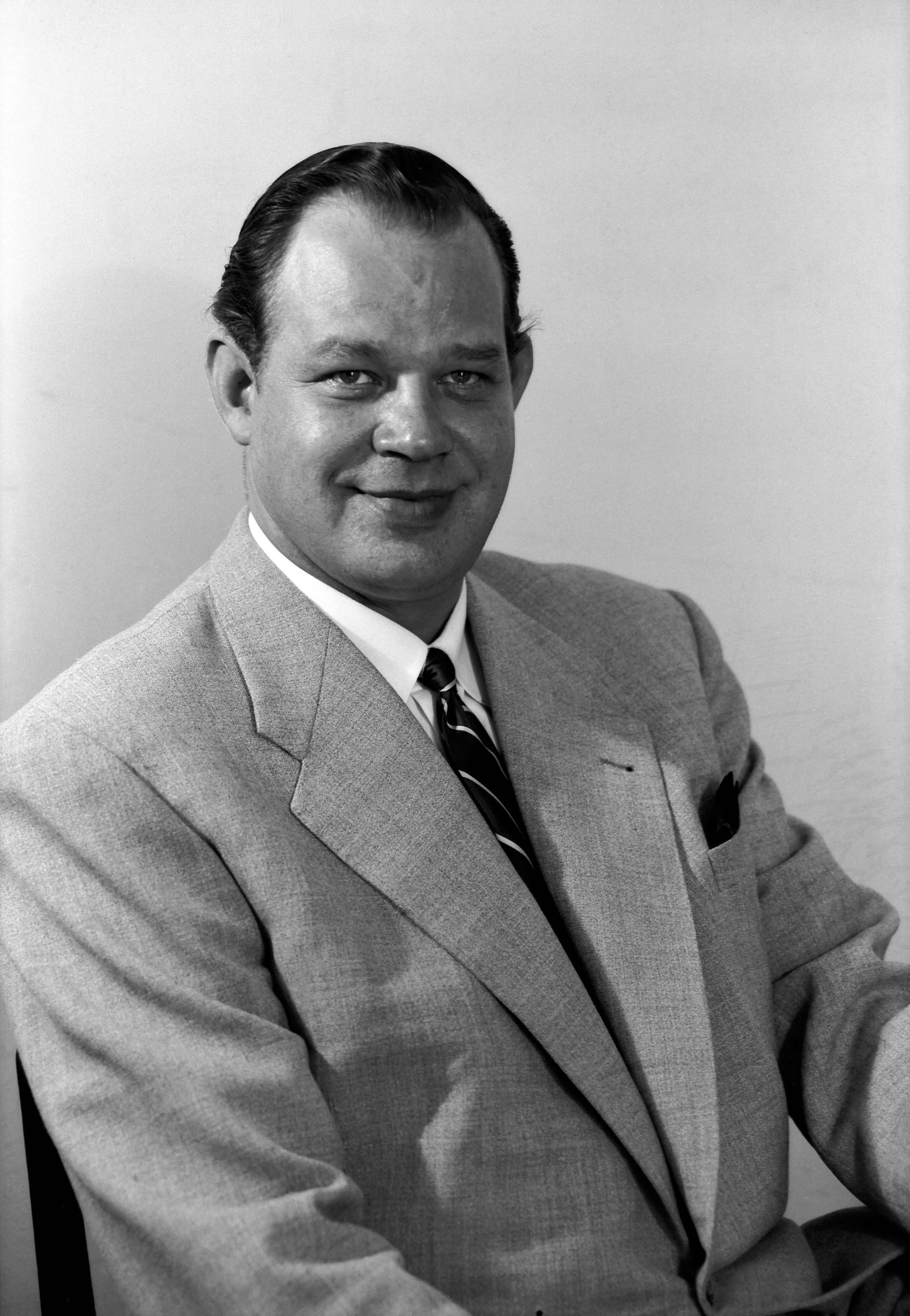
- Käyhkö in 1954

Background information
- Born: 5 April 1916; Petrograd, Russia (now Saint Petersburg)
- Died: 8 April 1983 (aged 67) Espoo, Finland
- Genres: Schlager, couplet, opera, folk music
- Instruments: Guitar, banjo, drums
- Years active: 1930–1976

Kauko Käyhkö (5 April 1916 – 8 April 1983) was a Finnish all-round entertainer – singer, songwriter, musician, actor, and writer – with a career spanning nearly half a century.

== Early life and education ==
Käyhkö was born in Petrograd (now St Petersburg) in 1916, while the Grand Duchy of Finland was still part of the Russian Empire, to railway conductor Juho Käyhkö and Aina née Palmros.

He completed junior high school, and went on to study construction, qualifying in 1940 as a master builder (rakennusmestari), although he never practised his trade.

== Career ==
Käyhkö is first and foremost remembered as a singer. He was a founding member of one of the leading post-war voice ensembles, the Kipparikvartetti quartet, established in 1950, where he sang 2nd bass. During his career he recorded over 600 songs, of which c. 400 as a member of Kipparikvartetti, and the rest as a soloist. One of his most popular recordings is Rakastan sinua, elämä, which was certified gold in 1972, and which four decades later remained among the top 20 best-selling Finnish singles.

Käyhkö also sang opera, performing the role of Osmin in Mozart's Die Entführung aus dem Serail, and the titular role of Everyman in the incidental music by Sibelius.

He was a versatile instrumentalist musician. He began his music career at the age of 13, playing the drums and the banjo in the Jazz-Havaiji orchestra, and throughout the 1930s and 40s he played the guitar in the Amarillo and Dallapé orchestras.

Between 1940 and 1959, Käyhkö also acted in over 20 films of different genres, from musicals to comedy to crime drama.

As part of Kipparikvartetti, he took part in the first Finnish television broadcast, in 1955.

In his later career, in the 1950s and 60s, Käyhkö worked in broadcast media for the Finnish public broadcaster Yle, in both radio and television, in the latter as a journalist as well as producer. For his achievements in television, he received the Telvis award in 1963.

Käyhkö wrote dozens of songs and song lyrics, radio comedy, screen and stage scrips, as well as two autobiographical books of his time in the Kipparikvartetti (1971) and Dallapé (1973) ensembles.

== Personal life ==
Käyhkö was married twice, first to Irja née West (m. 1935, div. 1948), and from 1950 to musician (accordionist) Eini née Kotiranta.
