= Hei tie =

Single by Maija Vilkkumaa

from the album Totuutta ja tehtävää
- Released: 20 September 2006
- Genre: Pop rock
- Length: 3:48
- Label: Warner Music Finland
- Songwriter(s): Maija Vilkkumaa

Maija Vilkkumaa singles chronology
| "Liian kauan" (2006) | "Hei tie" (2006) | "Suojatiellä" (2008) |

"Hei tie" (in English, "Hey There, Road") is a song by Finnish recording artist Maija Vilkkumaa. It was released by Warner Music Finland on 20 September 2006, as the only single from her compilation album Totuutta ja tehtävää. Written by Vilkkumaa, the song was Vilkkumaa's first number-one single on the Finnish Singles Chart, debuting at the peak position and charting for three weeks.

== Track listing and formats ==
- Digital download

| No. | Title | Writer(s) | Arrangement | Length |
|---|---|---|---|---|
| 1. | "Hei tie" | Maija Vilkkumaa | Mikko Kosonen, Niko Kokko, Jan Pethman, Tero Pennanen | 3:48 |

== See also ==
- List of number-one singles of 2006 (Finland)
