= Satumaa-tango =

Single by Maija Vilkkumaa

from the album Pitkä ihana leikki
- Released: 1999
- Genre: Pop rock
- Length: 4:46
- Label: Warner Music Finland
- Songwriter: Maija Vilkkumaa

Maija Vilkkumaa singles chronology
"Satumaa-tango" (1999)	"Salaa" (1999)

"Satumaa-tango" (in English, "Satumaa Tango") is a song by Finnish pop rock singer-songwriter Maija Vilkkumaa. Released by Warner Music Finland in 1999 as the debut single from her debut album Pitkä ihana leikki, the song is written by Vilkkumaa. The song peaked at number seven on its debut week on the Finnish Singles Chart and charted five weeks later at number nine.

== Track listing ==
No.	Title	Writer(s)	Arrangement	Length
1.	"Satumaa-tango" (Satumaa Tango)	Maija Vilkkumaa	Janne Lehto	4:26
2.	"Satumaa-tango (albumiversio)" (Satumaa Tango (album version))	Maija Vilkkumaa	Janne Lehto	4:46
