= Mun elämä =

Single by Maija Vilkkumaa

from the album Ei
- B-side: "Ne jotka tyytyy"
- Released: 2003
- Genre: Pop rock
- Length: 4:32
- Label: Warner Music Finland
- Songwriter: Maija Vilkkumaa

Maija Vilkkumaa singles chronology
"Ei" (2003)	"Mun elämä" (2003)	"Ei saa surettaa" (2003)

"Mun elämä" (English: My Life) is a song by Finnish pop rock singer-songwriter Maija Vilkkumaa. Released by Warner Music Finland in 2003 as the second single from her third studio album Ei, the release included the B-side "Ne jotka tyytyy" (Those Who Don't Ask for More). Written by Vilkkumaa, the song peaked at number five on its second week on the Finnish Singles Chart and charted for seven weeks.

== Track listing ==
All tracks are written by Maija Vilkkumaa

No.	Title	Arrangement	Length
1.	"Mun elämä"	Niko Kokko, Mikko Kosonen, Tero Pennanen, Jan Pethman, Maija Vilkkumaa	4:13
2.	"Ne jotka tyytyy"	Niko Kokko, Mikko Kosonen, Tero Pennanen, Jan Pethman, Maija Vilkkumaa	2:31
