= Tähti =

Tähti is a Finnish surname and Estonian feminine given name meaning "star". Notable people with the name include:

== Given name ==
- Tähti Alver (born 1994), Estonian triple jumper and long jumper

== Surname ==
- Annikki Tähti (1929–2017), Finnish schlager singer
- Filip Almström-Tähti (1991), Swedish football defender
- Jouni Tähti (1968), Finnish disabled pool player
- Leo-Pekka Tähti (1983), athlete and Paralympian from Finland

== See also ==
- Takhti (surname)
