= Reijo Taipale =

Finnish singer (1940–2019)

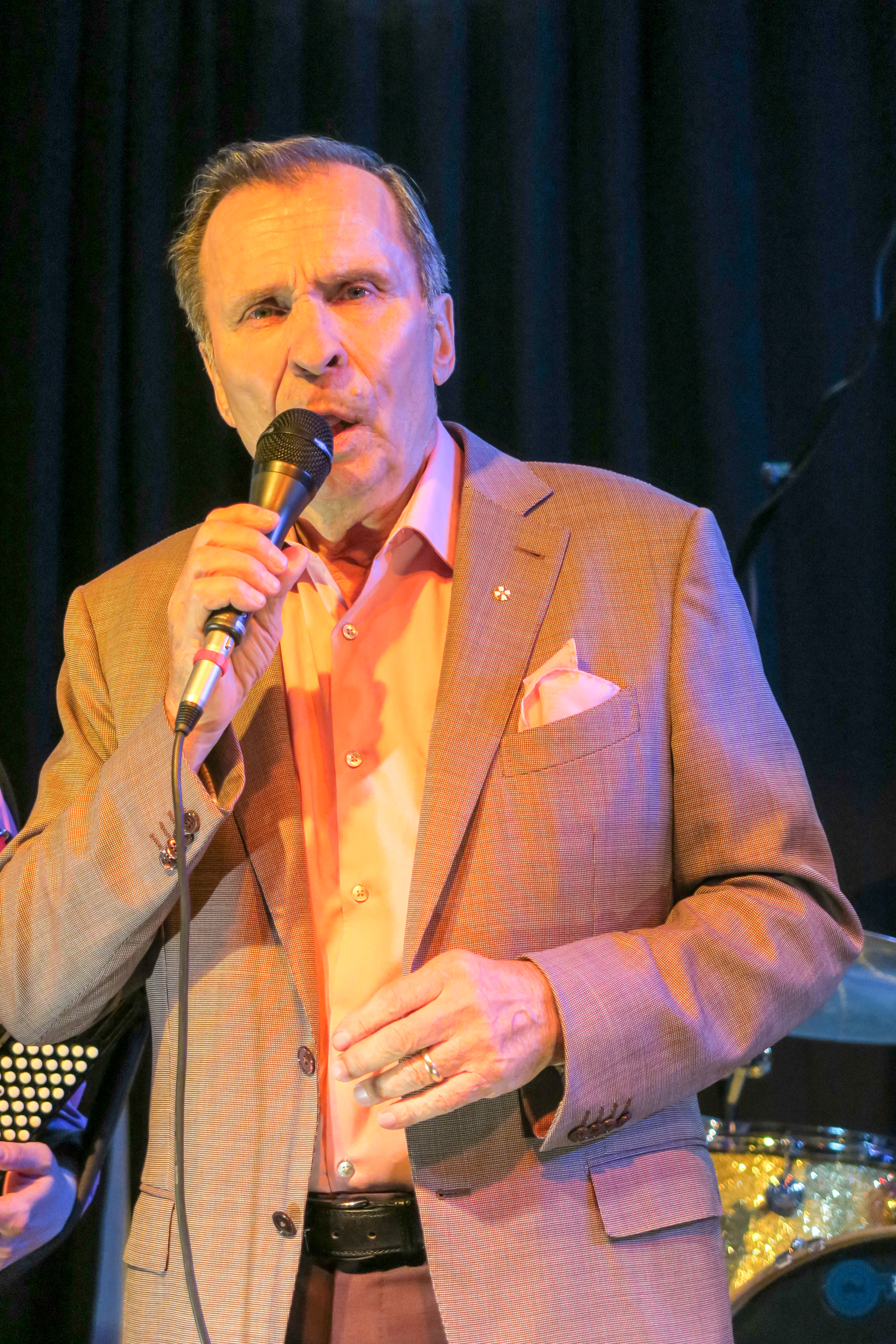
Reijo Taipale

Reijo Toivo Taipale (9 March 1940 – 26 April 2019) was a Finnish pop singer, active since the 1950s, specializing in Schlager music and tango. Many of his albums have been certified gold and platinum.

== Biography ==
Taipale was born in Miehikkälä, Finland. Throughout the 1970s, he collaborated closely with Eino Grön, with the two releasing four joint albums of tango music.

Taipale died in Helsinki from complications of dementia on 26 April 2019 at the age of 79.

== Discography ==
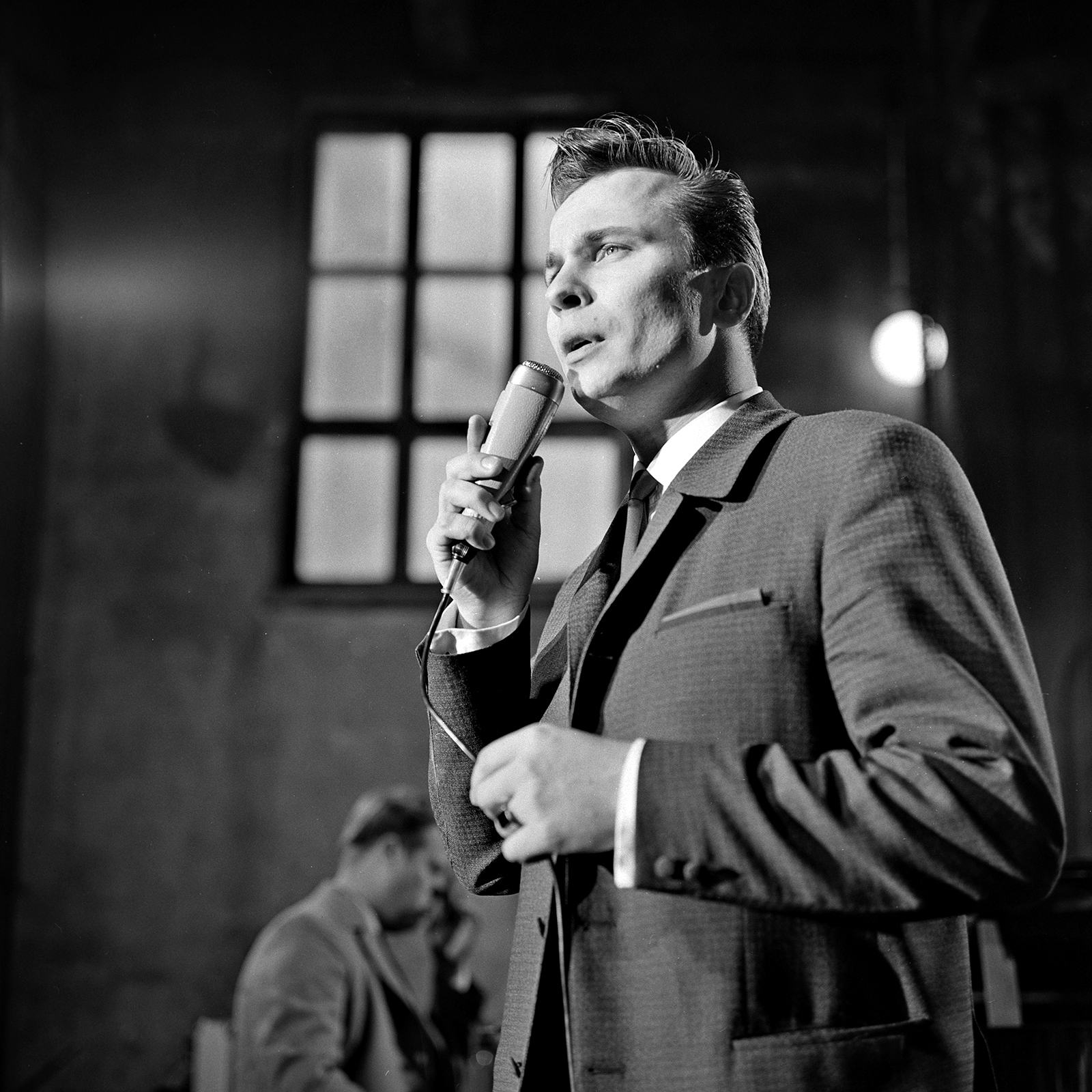
Reijo Taipale in 1965

=== Albums ===
- 1966: Reijo
- 1968: Reijo Taipale
- 1970: Ethän minua unhoita
- 1971: Unto Monosen muistolle (with Eija Merilä and Esko Rahkonen)
- 1973: Kahden kanssasi
- 1975: Amado mio
- 1975: Reijon taipaleelta
- 1976: Juhlakonsertti
- 1976: Muistoja ja tunteita
- 1977: Angelique
- 1978: Juhlavalssit
- 1979: Unohtumaton ilta
- 1980: Kaipaan sua
- 1981: Olen saanut elää
- 1982: Elämän parketeilla
- 1984: 25 vuotta taipaleella
- 1986: Ruusu joka vuodesta
- 1987: Rakkauskirje
- 1987: Kotiseutuni − Muistojen Miehikkälä (with Kalevi Korpi & Erkki Pärtty)
- 1989: Virran rannalla
- 1990: Tulisuudelma
- 1990: Elämän tanssit
- 1991: Olit täysikuu
- 1992: Taas kutsuu Karjala
- 1992: Toivo Kärjen kauneimmat tangot
- 1992: Kulkukoirat (with Topi Sorsakoski)
- 1993: Soita kitara kaipaustani
- 1993: Onnen maa
- 1994: Unta näin taas

Year	Album	Peak positions
Year	Album	FIN
1995	Natalie	32
1996	Jaksaa vanhakin tanssia	30
1998	Jäi yöstä muisto vain	27
2001	Elämän virta	11
2003	Ihan kuin nuo toiset	38
2006	Sateen hiljainen ääni	15
2008	Muistojen polku	–
2010	Taipaleen tie	–
2014	Valon lapsi	11

=== Joint albums with Eino Grön ===
- 1970: 16 tangoa
- 1973: 16 tangoa 2
- 1978: 16 tangoa (1978)
- 1978: Toiset 16 tangoa

=== Compilation album ===
- 1982: Satumaa
- 1991: Ruusujen aika (levytyksiä vuosilta 1986−1991)
- 1995: 20 suosikkia − Onnen maa
- 1996: Saapuuko hän (levytyksiä vuosilta 1990−1996)

Year	Album	Peak positions
Year	Album	FIN
1997	Juhlalevy	31
1998	20 suosikkia − Aila	–
1998	Unohtumattomat	5
2001	20 suosikkia − Kielon jäähyväiset	5
2004	Unohtumattomat 2	10
2005	Unohtumattomat 3	40
2007	40 unohtumatonta tangoa ja valssia	20
2007	Tuulet kääntyy pohjoiseen – Kaikki Fonovox-levytykset 1975–1978	–
