= Satumaa =

1955 song by Unto Mononen

Song by Reijo Taipale
- Language: Finnish
- English title: The Fabled Land
- B-side: "Tuntematon Armas"
- Published: 1955
- Released: 1962
- Recorded: October 24, 1962
- Genre: Tango
- Label: Scandia
- Songwriter: Unto Mononen
- Composer: Kaarlo Valkama (arranger)

"Satumaa" (roughly, in English "The Fabled Land" or "The Fairytale Land") is the quintessential Finnish tango. It was written by Unto Mononen, and published in 1955. The most famous recording is probably the one made by Reijo Taipale in 1962. The lyrics tell a story of a distant land beyond the sea – a happy paradise – however, the narrator can only reach it in his thoughts. The song has been recorded countless times, mainly by male Finnish tango singers.

An unusual take on "Satumaa" (and perhaps one more likely to be known outside of Finland) appears on a Frank Zappa live album from a Helsinki concert in 1974. Requested at short notice, the band plays the song from sheet music with the (non-Finnish-speaking) vocalist Napoleon Murphy Brock trying his best to read the Finnish lyrics. Dweezil Zappa and his ensemble Zappa plays Zappa played a part of the song on their 6 June 2009 and 29 November 2013 concerts at the same venue.

The name "Satumaa" is also mentioned in a pop rock song "Satumaa-tango" by Finnish Maija Vilkkumaa.

M.A. Numminen, in his novel Tango is my passion, says: "I have heard it was proposed for inclusion in a new hymn book. I think it would be wonderful if it was hymn number 666. During the service I could dance to it with organ accompaniment. Perhaps I would get nearer to God."

== Recordings ==
- Reijo Taipale, 1962
- Sanna Pietiäinen ja M.A. Numminen und Das Neorustikale Tango-Orchester on Finnischer Tango - Onko onni unta vain?
- on Tango notturno Isabel Bayrakdarian, CBC
- Jari Sillanpää on Songs Finland Sings 2002 (in English, under the title Fairyland)
- Arja Saijonmaa 1981 (rare example of a female singer)

== See also ==
- Finnish tango
