= Maija Vilkkumaa =

Finnish pop rock singer-songwriter (born 1973)

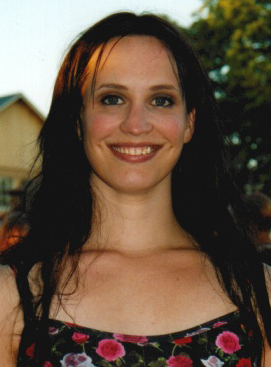
- Maija Vilkkumaa in 2001

Background information
- Born: 9 November 1973 (age 53); Helsinki, Finland
- Genres: Pop rock, suomirock
- Instrument: Vocals
- Years active: 1990–present
- Label: Warner Music Finland
- Website: www.maijavilkkumaa.net

Maija Johanna Vilkkumaa (born 9 November 1973) is a Finnish pop rock singer-songwriter. Beginning her musical hobbies playing piano at an age before school, Vilkkumaa studied in high school where she and her friends set up the band Tarharyhmä in 1990, which broke up in 1995. While studying Finnish language at the University of Helsinki, she started to take singing lessons and went on to start her solo career in 1999.

During her solo career from 1999 to 2011, Vilkkumaa has released eight full-length solo albums and sold over 300,000 certified records, becoming the tenth-best-selling female soloist in Finland. Along with meeting commercial success, the singer—who writes and composes the songs by herself—has also been credited for her songwriting skills by receiving the Juha Vainio Award. She has also received five Emma Awards, accolades for outstanding achievements in music, awarded by the Finnish music industry federation, Musiikkituottajat, and five Emma nominations.

== Life and career ==
=== 1973–1993: Early life and education ===
Maija Vilkkumaa was born in Helsinki on 9 November 1973. She has two little sisters, and she lived her childhood in the neighborhood of Töölö. She began playing piano beginning younger than at the age of seven and finished when she was 16. In 1992, Vilkkumaa completed her matriculation examination at Kallio High School in Helsinki and studied Finnish language at the University of Helsinki since 1993.

=== 1990s: Tarharyhmä, solo career beginnings and Pitkä ihana leikki ===
In 1990, Maija Vilkkumaa set up the band Tarharyhmä with her friends, gaining national radio play with its songs. Vilkkumaa wrote and composed most of the songs. With Tarharyhmä breaking up in 1995, Vilkkumaa started to attend singing lessons. She has also played keyboard in the band Hunajamelonit (Honey Melons).

In 1999, Vilkkumaa started a solo career setting up a band around her. The band consisted of keyboard player Tero Pennanen, bassist Niko Kokko and guitarist Mikko Kosonen. In August of the same year, Vilkkumaa released her debut album Pitkä ihana leikki (Long Sweet Game), after the arrival of its debut single "Satumaa-tango". With the debut album peaking at number three on the Finnish Albums Chart and selling gold with over 38,000 copies, critics welcomed Vilkkumaa as an inventive new artist in the then-sparse scene of Finnish female pop rockers and she received the 2000 Emma Award for New Female Soloist of the Year. At the same event, Pitkä ihana leikki was nominated for Debut Album of the Year.

=== 2000s: Meikit, ketjut ja vyöt, Ei, Se ei olekaan niin and Superpallo ===
In 2001, Vilkkumaa released her second studio album, Meikit, ketjut ja vyöt (Make-ups, Necklaces and Belts) which was her first number-one release on the Albums Chart and sold nearly 37,000 copies, earning her her second gold certification. By the 2003 release of her third studio album, Ei (No), Vilkkumaa established her status as one of the prominent contemporary Finnish musicians—the album debuted at number one on the Albums Chart, while charting for over a year (56 weeks), and sold over 120,000 copies (double-platinum) in Finland. Ei earned her three Emma Awards: for Female Soloist of the Year, Album of the Year and Pop/Rock Album of the Year.

Ei was followed by Vilkkumaa's fourth studio album Se ei olekaan niin (But It's Not Like That) in 2005, which sold over 47,000 copies and earned the artist her second platinum certification and the 2005 Emma Award for Female Soloist of the Year. Preceding Vilkkumaa's first compilation, Totuutta ja tehtävää (Truth and Dare), its lead single "Hei tie" (Hey There, Road) was Vilkkumaa's first number-one release on the Finnish Singles Chart, in September 2006. Released in November 2006, Totuutta ja tehtävää peaked at number four on the Albums Chart and sold gold with over 25,000 copies. In early 2007, Maija Vilkkumaa embarked on her first major concert tour, Totuutta ja tehtävää. The performances were recorded for her first live album, Ilta Savoyssa (Evening at Savoy).

Vilkkumaa's fifth studio album, Superpallo (Bouncy Ball) was released in October 2008. Selling gold with 19,000 copies and spawning three singles, "Suojatiellä" (On the Pedestrian Crossing), "Luokkakokous" (Class Reunion) and "Mä haluun naimisiin" (I Wanna Get Married), the album did not meet with as much success as the previous studio albums, though still debuting at number one on the Albums Chart. However, Vilkkumaa received three nominations at the 2009 Emma Awards: Female Soloist of the Year, Album of the Year (Superpallo) and Rock Album of the Year. In 2009, Vilkkumaa embarked on her second major tour, 10 + 10, to celebrate the ten years that had passed since the release of Pitkä ihana leikki.

=== 2010s: Kunnes joet muuttaa suuntaa and departure from the band ===
In April 2010, Vilkkumaa released her sixth studio album, Kunnes joet muuttaa suuntaa (Until Rivers Change Direction). Though continuing the trend of declining record sales, the album still debuted at number one on the Albums Chart and sold gold with 16,000 copies. In July 2010, Vilkkumaa was awarded the prestigious Juha Vainio Award worth €6,000 for her merits as the "pioneer songwriter of her generation". The Board of Juha Vainio Fund justified its decision, saying, "Maija Vilkkumaa's texts present good colloquial language" and that "the lyrics are a classical example of how modern language works in songs". In February 2011, Vilkkumaa received her fifth Emma nomination for Female Soloist of the Year. On 5 April 2011, Maija Vilkkumaa announced in her press release that she would leave her band after the 2011 summer tour. Not sure when she would start doing music again and whether with a band or not, she stated she wanted to have a break and "take a breath". In January 2012, Vilkkumaa performed at a fundraising concert for the presidential campaign of the Green League's candidate Pekka Haavisto.

== Personal life ==
On 28 April 2007, Maija Vilkkumaa married Mikko Kosonen (the guitarist of her band), after having been in a relationship since 2002. The couple has two children, daughter Saara, who was born in 2007, and another daughter, who was born in January 2011.

== Discography ==
- Pitkä ihana leikki (1999)
- Meikit, ketjut ja vyöt (2001)
- Ei (2003)
- Se ei olekaan niin (2005)
- Totuutta ja tehtävää (2006)
- Ilta Savoyssa (2007)
- Superpallo (2008)
- Kunnes joet muuttaa suuntaa (2010)
- Aja! (2015)
- 1973 (2022)
- Karaoke-queen (2026)

== Awards and nominations ==
=== Emma Awards ===
| Year | Nominee / work | Award | Result |
|---|---|---|---|
| 2000 | Maija Vilkkumaa | Emma Award for New Female Soloist of the Year | Won |
| 2000 | Pitkä ihana leikki | Emma Award for Debut Album of the Year | Nominated |
| 2004 | Maija Vilkkumaa | Emma Award for Female Soloist of the Year | Won |
| 2004 | Ei | Emma Award for Album of the Year | Won |
| 2004 | Ei | Emma Award for Pop/Rock Album of the Year | Won |
| 2006 | Maija Vilkkumaa | Emma Award for Female Soloist of the Year | Won |
| 2009 | Maija Vilkkumaa | Emma Award for Female Soloist of the Year | Nominated |
| 2009 | Superpallo | Emma Award for Album of the Year | Nominated |
| 2009 | Superpallo | Emma Award for Rock Album of the Year | Nominated |
| 2011 | Maija Vilkkumaa | Emma Award for Female Soloist of the Year | Nominated |

== See also ==
- List of best-selling music artists in Finland
