= Musiikkituottajat =

Finnish organization of record producers

Musiikkituottajat – IFPI Finland ry, or Musiikkituottajat for short (English: Music Producers; formerly known as Suomen Ääni- ja kuvatallennetuottajat; ÄKT), IFPI Finland in English, is the umbrella organization of recording producers active in Finland, with 23 record labels as its members.

== Activity ==
The aim of the association is "to improve the cultural-political situation and legal protections of record production, develop the distribution and production of recordings and music videos and participate in governing and overseeing the production rights". Musiikkituottajat is the Finnish representative of the International Federation of the Phonographic Industry (IFPI). It is also one of the three member associations of Gramex.

Since 1994, Musiikkituottajat has been responsible for composing the official records chart, the Official Finnish Charts. The list was produced in cooperation with the Finnish Broadcasting Company (Yleisradio) until late 2009. The association governs the ISRC codes used in Finland and it also keeps account of the best-selling recordings of all time in Finland and awards acts with the gold and platinum certifications (below).

== Certification ==
In certifying recordings sold in Finland, Musiikkituottajat takes into account both physical and digital sales. The certifications awarded by Musiikkituottajat and their sales limits are the following:

=== Albums ===
- Gold: 10,000
- Platinum: 20,000
- Double platinum: 40,000
- Triple platinum: 60,000
- (etc.)

Note: Domestic albums use the current threshold for albums released on or after 1 January 2010. For foreign albums, the threshold was used for albums released on or after 1 January 2008. Double, triple and multi-platinum award levels were introduced in 1989.

=== Singles, EPs and DVDs ===
- Gold: 5,000
- Platinum: 10,000
- Double platinum: 20,000
- (etc.)

Video certifications was introduced in June 2004. For extended plays, it uses the current thresholds, for releases on or after 1 January 2010.

=== Certification levels (timeline) ===
Music recording certification was introduced in Finland in September 1971.

=== Albums ===
Gold

Certification	Before July 1973	Before October 1975	Before January 1994	Before January 2001	Before January 2010	Since January 2010
Gold	20,000	15,000	25,000	20,000	15,000	10,000

Platinum

Certification	Before January 1989	Before January 1994	Before January 2001	Before January 2010	Since January 2010
Platinum	100,000	50,000	40,000	30,000	20,000

Diamond

Certification	From October 1975 until 31 December 1988
Diamond	50,000

=== Singles ===
Gold

Certification	Before 1 January 1991	Since 1 January 1991
Gold	10,000	5,000

Platinum

Certification	Since 1 January 1994
Platinum	10,000

== List of albums certified by Musiikkituottajat ==
=== Gold ===
- 2nd to None
- Aerial (album)
- Alone
- Animalize
- Appetite for Destruction
- Artpop
- ...Baby One More Time
- Ballbreaker
- Believe
- The Best of 1980–1990
- The Best of 1990–2000
- The Best of Sade
- Best Of – Volume I
- The Big Picture
- Blow Up Your Video
- Born This Way
- Bridge Over Troubled Water
- Britney
- Cieli di Toscana
- Crazy Love
- Crazy Nights
- Everything Changes
- Europop
- Forty Licks
- Greatest Hits (Bon Jovi)
- The Greatest Hits (Cher)
- Happiness
- Incanto
- Indestructible
- Innuendo (album)
- In The Zone
- Ixnay on the Hombre
- J.Lo
- Led Zeppelin Remasters
- Legend
- Live Summer 2003
- Love. Angel. Music. Baby.
- A Medio Vivir
- The Memory of Trees
- Mercury Falling
- The Miracle
- Monster
- Mothership
- My Christmas
- Nevermind
- A Night at the Opera
- Not That Kind
- On How Life Is
- Only by the Night
- Oral Fixation Vol. 2
- Paint the Sky with Stars
- Piece of Mind
- Pitkä ihana leikki
- Playing the Angel
- Private Dancer
- Le Roi est mort, vive le Roi!
- Reality Killed The Video Star
- Romanza
- Screamworks: Love in Theory and Practice
- The Silent Force
- The Soul Cages
- Sing When You're Winning
- Spirits Having Flown
- Steal This Album!
- Stiff Upper Lip
- Stilelibero
- Supposed Former Infatuation Junkie
- Talk on Corners
- Ten Summoner's Tales
- Time to Say Goodbye
- Toto IV
- Totuutta ja tehtävää
- Tra te e il mare
- Unplugged (Eric Clapton)
- Venus Doom
- Vuelve
- Working on a Dream

=== Platinum ===
- 1
- 21st Century Breakdown
- Americana
- Amore
- Anastacia
- ...And Justice for All
- And Love Said No: The Greatest Hits 1997–2004
- Back for Good
- Back to Black
- The Best of Laura Pausini: E ritorno da te
- By the Way
- Dangerous
- Dark Light
- Deep Shadows and Brilliant Highlights
- Escapology
- Fallen
- The Fame
- Freak of Nature
- Funhouse
- Greatest Hits: My Prerogative
- Greatest Hits (Robbie Williams)
- Greatest Lovesongs Vol. 666
- Green Eyed Soul
- Hybrid Theory
- I Need You
- Ihmisten edessä
- The Immaculate Collection
- Infinite
- Intensive Care
- Iron Man 2
- LOL
- The Long Play
- Love Metal
- Made in Heaven
- Make It Big
- Meikit, ketjut ja vyöt
- Mi Sangre
- No Angel
- Oops!... I Did It Again
- The Razors Edge
- ReLoad
- Rudebox
- Se ei olekaan niin
- Spice
- Survivor
- The Simon and Garfunkel Collection: 17 of Their All-Time Greatest Recordings
- These Days
- Tragic Kingdom
- True Blue
- Use Your Illusion I
- Van Halen
- Viva la Vida or Death and All His Friends
- X&Y

=== Double Platinum ===
- 21
- Aquarium
- Born in the U.S.A.
- Brothers in Arms
- Cross Road
- Ei
- The Eminem Show
- Gold: Greatest Hits
- Hijas del Tomate
- Jagged Little Pill
- Let's Talk About Love
- Metallica
- Razorblade Romance
- Something to Remember
- Spiceworld
- Vapaa ja yksin

=== Triple or more Platinum ===
- Kun valaistun
- Laundry Service
- Load

Nightwish

- Wishmaster
- Imaginaerum
- Dark Passion Play
- Once
- Seili
- Strike!

== History ==
The organization was established in 1970 under the name Äänilevytuottajat ("Sound Record Producers"). Before 1970, the companies in the industry were unionized in Soitinalan Tuottajaliitto ("Organization of Musical Instrument Producers"). In 1982, the organization took the name Suomen Ääni- ja kuvatallennetuottajat ÄKT, which became the current Musiikkituottajat on 26 August 2010.

== Events ==
Musiikkituottajat organizes the following annual events:

- Emma Awards for the most successful artists and professionals of the year
- Muuvi Awards for the best music videos of the year

In addition, Musiikkituottajat organized the JANNE Awards for the best productions in classical music. The awards were cancelled in 2002 and since 2006, the awards have been incorporated in the Emma Awards.

== Management ==
=== Activities directors ===
- Arto Alaspää 1975–2009
- Lauri Rechardt 2010–present

=== Board ===
As of March 2011 the board includes:

- Chairperson: Niko Nordström (Warner Music)
- Vice Chairperson: Epe Helenius (Sound of Finland)

Members:
- Jarkko Nordlund (Ratas Music Group)
- Joose Berglund (Universal Music Group)
- Juha Ruuska (Stupido Records)
- Kimmo Valtanen (KSF Entertainment Group)
- Markku Takkunen (Sony Music Entertainment)
- Tapio Korjus (EMI)
- Tom Pannula (Rockadillo, IndieCo)
- Playground Music Bam

== See also ==
- The Official Finnish Charts
