= Aku =

Aku may refer to:

- Aku, Nigeria, a town in Enugu State
- "Aku" (poem), 1943, by Chairil Anwar
- Aku people of Gambia
- Aku dialect, a dialect of Sierra Leone Krio
- Aku, the main antagonist of the animated television series Samurai Jack
- The Hawaiian word for skipjack tuna
- Hal Lewis (Aku) (died 1983), a Hawaii radio presenter
- Yū Aku (1937–2007), Japanese lyricist, poet, and novelist
- Aku (given name)
- Aku (album), by Japanese band MUCC (2020)

AKU may refer to:

- Aksu Airport, China (IATA code AKU)
- Aryabhatta Knowledge University, Bihar, India
- Adaptation kit upgrade, for updating Windows Mobile
- Afyon Kocatepe University, Turkey
- Aga Khan University, Pakistan, East Africa, and the UK
- Al-Kafaàt University, Beirut, Lebanon
- Alkaptonuria, or black urine disease
- Algemene Kunstzijde Unie, a Dutch company merged into Akzo Nobel

== See also ==
- Aku Aku (disambiguation)
