= List of best-selling albums in Finland =

This is the list of the best-selling certified albums in Finland, according to Musiikkituottajat – IFPI Finland.

Position	Artist(s)	Album	Release year	Sales	Certifications	Nationality	Source
1	Jari Sillanpää	Jari Sillanpää	1995	272,942	6 × platinum	FIN	
2	Eppu Normaali	Repullinen hittejä	1996	250,377	6 × platinum	FIN	
3	Kirka	Surun pyyhit silmistäni	1988	214,196	2 × platinum	FIN	
4	Dingo	Kerjäläisten valtakunta	1985	190,894	1 × platinum	FIN	
5	Joel Hallikainen	Joel Hallikainen	1992	178,654	3 × platinum	FIN	
6	Various artists	Vain elämää	2012	177,972	8 × platinum	FIN	
7	Kaija Koo	Tuulten viemää	1993	175,144	3 × platinum	FIN	
8	Smurffit	Tanssihitit vol. 1	1996	174,608	4 × platinum	FIN	
9	Hurriganes	Roadrunner	1974	171,224	11 × gold	FIN	
10	Vesa-Matti Loiri	Sydämeeni joulun teen	1988	167,788	1 × platinum	FIN	
11	Topi Sorsakoski & Agents	Bésame Mucho	1987	165,833	1 × platinum	FIN	
12	Jari Sillanpää	Auringonnousu	1997	160,310	4 × platinum	FIN	
13	Anssi Kela	Nummela	2001	157,199	5 × platinum	FIN	
14	Jenni Vartiainen	Seili	2010	151,833	7 × platinum	FIN	
15	Various artists	Finnhits 2	1983	150,856	1 × platinum	FIN	
16	Various artists	Rakkaimmat joululaulut	1986	150,598	1 × platinum	FIN	
17	Tapio Rautavaara	Reissumiehen taival	1979	150,000	1 × platinum	FIN	
18	Queen	Greatest Hits II	1991	149,622	2 × platinum	UK	
19	Leevi and the Leavings	Keskiviikko... 40 ensimmäistä hittiä	1997	149,497	3 × platinum	FIN	
20	Jari Sillanpää	Hyvää joulua	1996	148,932	3 × platinum	FIN	
21	Fröbelin palikat	Sutsisatsi	1993	148,579	2 × platinum	FIN	
22	Yö	Legenda	2001	146,614	4 × platinum	FIN	
23	ABBA	Gold: Greatest Hits	1992	145,962	2 × platinum	SWE	
24	Yö	Rakkaus on lumivalkoinen	2003	137,775	4 × platinum	FIN	
25	Topi Sorsakoski & Agents	Pop	1988	136,110	1 × platinum	FIN	
26	Aikakone	Tähtikaaren taa	1995	134,958	3 × platinum	FIN	
27	Bomfunk MC's	In Stereo	1999	134,610	3 × platinum	FIN	
28	J. Karjalainen	Suurimmat hitit	1992	134,579	2 × platinum	FIN	
29	Topi Sorsakoski & Agents	In Beat	1986	134,496	1 × platinum	FIN	
30	Various artists	Mestarit areenalla	1999	131,811	3 × platinum	FIN	
31	Nightwish	Dark Passion Play	2007	126,084	4 × platinum	FIN	
32	Lauri Tähkä & Elonkerjuu	Tuhannen riemua	2007	125,912	4 × platinum	FIN	
33	Irwin Goodman	Rentun ruusu	1988	125,000	1 × platinum	FIN	
34	Eppu Normaali	Kahdeksas ihme	1985	124,715	1 × platinum	FIN	
35	Eppu Normaali	Valkoinen kupla	1986	124,488	1 × platinum	FIN	
36	Bon Jovi	Cross Road	1994	123,354	3 × platinum	USA	
37	Matti ja Teppo	Et voi tulla rajan taa	1980	121,579	1 × platinum	FIN	
38	Pikku G	Räjähdysvaara	2003	121,204	4 × platinum	FIN	
39	Maija Vilkkumaa	Ei	2003	120,767	4 × platinum	FIN	
40	Anna Hanski	Jos et sä soita	1992	120,415	2 × platinum	FIN	
41	Michael Jackson	Thriller	1983	119,061	1 × platinum	USA	
42	Vesa-Matti Loiri	Eino Leino	1978	117,903	2 × platinum	FIN	
43	Robin	Koodi	2012	117,126	5 × platinum	FIN	
44	Laura Voutilainen	Laura Voutilainen	1994	116,960	2 × platinum	FIN	
45	Dire Straits	Brothers in Arms	1985	116,784	1 × platinum	UK	
46	Kari Tapio	Myrskyn jälkeen	1995	115,289	2 × platinum	FIN	
47 (tie)	Erkki Junkkarinen	Ruusuja hopeamaljassa	1974	115,000	7 × gold	FIN	
47 (tie)	Baccara	Baccara	1977	115,000	1 × platinum	SPA	
48	Matti ja Teppo	Pidä itsestäsi huolta	1982	114,906	1 × platinum	FIN	
49	Kim Lönnholm	Minä olen muistanut	1989	114,034	2 × platinum	FIN	
50	Metallica	Metallica	1991	112,856	2 × platinum	USA	

== See also ==
- List of best-selling albums
- List of best-selling singles in Finland
- List of best-selling music artists in Finland
