= Kahdeksas ihme =

Studio album by Eppu Normaali
- Released: 19 August 1985
- Length: 38:54
- Language: Finnish
- Label: Poko Rekords
- Producer: Mikko "Pantse" Syrjä

Eppu Normaali chronology
Rupisia riimejä, karmeita tarinoita (1984)	Kahdeksas ihme (1985)	Valkoinen kupla (1986)

Singles from Kahdeksas ihme
- 1. "Kitara, taivas ja tähdet" Released: June 1985; 2. "Voi kuinka me sinua kaivataan" Released: October 1985; 3. "Vuonna '85" Released: January 1986

Kahdeksas ihme (The Eighth Wonder) is the eighth album of Finnish rock group Eppu Normaali. The album was produced by Mikko "Pantse" Syrjä, one of the guitarist of the band. It was released on 19 August 1985 through Poko Rekords, and it is one of the most famous and best-selling albums of Eppu Normaali and among the 40 best-selling albums of all time in Finland.

Kahdeksas ihme is the best selling studio album of the band, and the second best selling album of the band after their compilation album Repullinen hittejä.

The album, considered as their best studio recording of all time, produced many hit songs for the band, including Vuonna '85 and Kitara, taivas ja tähdet. These two songs are still heavily played in Finnish radio stations. Also the songs Voi kuinka me sinua kaivataan, Elämän tarkoitus and Vihreän joen rannalla (kauan sitten) became hit songs. The album was certified for double platinum in 1995.

In 2005, the 20th Anniversary Edition of the album was released. It included the album itself, and also the remastered version of their 1985 VHS release Video, taivas ja tähdet and previously unreleased version of the track Vihreän joen rannalla (kauan sitten).

All lyrics of the album are made by Martti Syrjä, the lead singer of the band, and all tracks are composed by his brother, guitarist Mikko "Pantse" Syrjä, except the track Yöjuttu, which is composed by the band's second guitarist, Juha Torvinen.

== Track listing ==
1. Tien päällä taas (On the road again)
2. Voi kuinka me sinua kaivataan (Oh how much we miss you)
3. Vuonna ‘85 (The year '85)
4. Elämän tarkoitus (The meaning of life)
5. Kitara, taivas ja tähdet (A Guitar, the sky and the stars)
6. Tihkumme seksia (We ooze sex)
7. Vihreän joen rannalla (kauan sitten) (Down by the green river (long ago))
8. Yöjuttu (Night-thing)
9. Läpivalaistu (Transilluminated)

== Personnel ==
=== Eppu Normaali ===
- Martti Syrjä - lead vocals
- Mikko “Pantse” Syrjä - rhythm- and lead guitar, backing vocals
- Juha Torvinen - rhythm- and lead guitar
- Mikko Nevalainen - bass guitar
- Aku Syrjä - drums

With

- Eero “Safka” Pekkonen - accordion

== See also ==
- List of best-selling albums in Finland
