= Pate Mustajärvi =

Finnish rock singer (1956–2025)

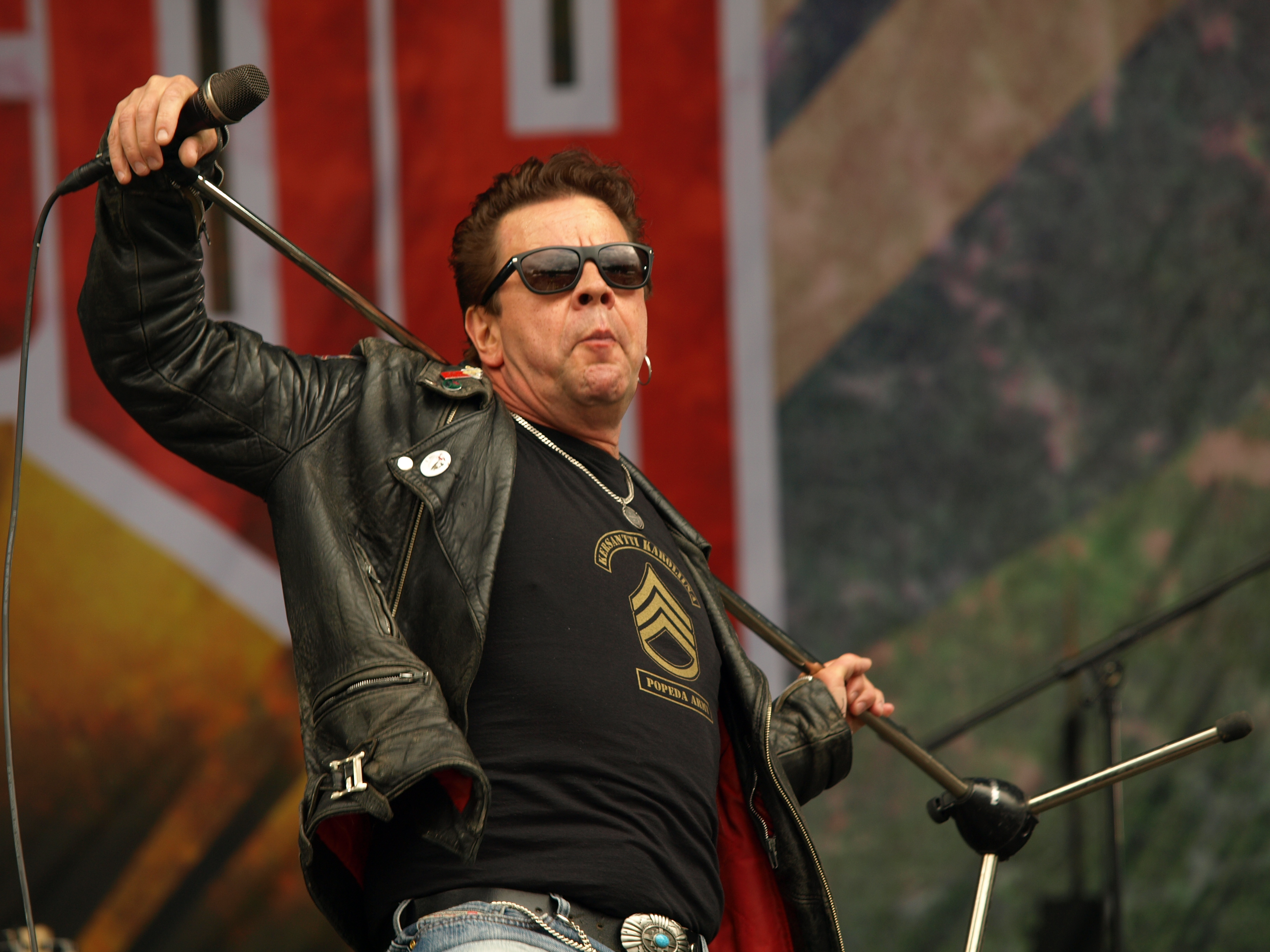
- Mustajärvi in 2013

Background information
- Born: Pauli Mustajärvi; 12 July 1956; Tampere, Finland
- Died: 26 December 2025 (aged 69)
- Genres: Rock
- Occupations: Singer; drummer
- Years active: 1977–2025
- Labels: Poko Rekords
- Formerly of: Popeda
- Website: pate.fi

Pauli Antero "Pate" Mustajärvi (12 July 1956 – 26 December 2025) was a Finnish rock singer. He was known as the vocalist, frontman and until his death in late 2025 the only original member of Popeda as well as a solo artist. In his birthplace of Tampere he was known as "Ikurin turbiini" ("the turbine of Ikuri").

== Life and career ==
Mustajärvi was born on 12 July 1956. He appears in the 1984 film Calamari Union by Aki Kaurismäki, playing one of the fifteen main characters named Frank.

In 2004 Mustajärvi performed two songs on the soundtrack of the Finnish action-thriller film Vares – yksityisetsivä. Mustajärvi released two cover albums in consecutive years, the first in 2009 featuring songs from his longtime friend Juice Leskinen, the other in 2010 dedicated to translations of Johnny Cash songs into Finnish.

Mustajärvi died on 26 December 2025, at the age of 69.

== Discography ==
=== Albums ===
With Popeda

See: Popeda discography

Solo

- 1984: Nyt!
- 1988: Lago Nero
- 1995: Ikurin turbiini
- 1998: Vol. 4
- 2000: Ukkometso
- 2005: Ajan päivin, ajan öin
- 2009: Ollaan ihmisiksi
- 2010: Musta
- 2013: Patentoitu
- 2015: Taivas on Täynnä
- 2016: 60 – Suurimmat Hitit 1983–2016
- 2018: 2018
- 2019: Teillä oli nimet, ja kerran te kuljitte täällä
- 2024: Pelkkää Patee

=== Singles ===
(Selective)

- 2005; "Ajan päivin, ajan öin"
- 2009: "Kaksoiselämää"

== Filmography ==
| Year | Film | Role |
|---|---|---|
| 1984 | Juice & Grand Slam: Nivalasta poikki | Himself |
| 1985 | Calamari Union | Frank |
| 1998 | Virgo | Diileri |
