= Aknepop =

Aknepop (Acnepop)

Studio album by Eppu Normaali
- Released: May 1978
- Recorded: 13–15 March 1978
- Genre: Punk rock
- Length: 32:18
- Label: Poko Rekords

Eppu Normaali chronology
Aknepop (Acnepop) (1978)	Maximum Jee&Jee (1979)

Aknepop is the debut album of Eppu Normaali, released in May 1978. It was recorded between 13–15 March 1978. Pertti Ström was a pseudonym used by Poko Records CEO Epe Helenius when he wrote for the Finnish music magazine Soundi.

== Track listing ==
1. Teen sinusta muusia (I'm Gonna Beat You into Pulp) 2.42
2. Diggaan itseäni (I Dig Myself) 2.36
3. James Dean (taas) (James Dean (Again)) 1.50
4. Oi maa (Oh, This Land) 2.32
5. Oppi tulee idästä (The Doctrine Comes From the East) 2.16
6. Kekkonen rock (Kekkonen Rock) 1.34 (Suomen Talvisota 1939-1940 cover)
7. Poliisi pamputtaa ([the] Police beats [with a truncheon]) 1.52
8. Poliisi pamputtaa taas ([the] Police beats [with truncheon] again) 1.52
9. Rääväsuita ei haluta Suomeen (Loudmouths are not desired in Finland) 3.06
10. Sotilaallinen tyhjiö (Militant Void) 3.40
11. Kaljaa nuorille (Beer for the Youth) 2.54
12. Suomi ryömii (Finland Crawls) 2.16
13. Kuka ön Pertti Ström (Who is Pertti Ström?) 2.05
14. (näin on) (so it is) 0.04
