= Aku ja köyhät pojat =

Studio album by Eppu Normaali
- Released: June 1983
- Recorded: MSL Studios, 1983
- Genre: Pop-rock
- Label: Poko Rekords
- Producer: Mikko "Pantse" Juhana Syrjä

Eppu Normaali chronology
Tie vie (1982)	Aku ja köyhät pojat (1983)	Rupisia riimejä, karmeita tarinoita (1984)

Aku ja köyhät pojat (lit. 'Aku and the poor boys') is Eppu Normaali's sixth album, released on June 5, 1983. It was different from their previous album Tie vie, because they did not use piano at all; as a result, the music is more guitar-based.

The album was named after a CCR album called Willy and the Poor Boys, which follows the format of their previous release, Akun tehdas (lit. 'Aku's factory'), which was named after the CCR album Cosmo's Factory.

Aku ja köyhät pojat has sold over 34,563 copies, and it went gold in 1991.

== Track listing ==
All songs written and arranged by Martti and Mikko Syrjä.

1. Rakkaus on KuuMaa (Love is Earth-Moon) 4:05
2. Uni laulusta (Dream of a song) 2:16
3. Toivomuskirjeitä jumalille (Wishing letters to Gods) 3:24
4. Rakastavaiset (Lovers) 3:55
5. Vaikerrus d-mollissa (A wail in d-minor) 4:23
6. Balladi kaiken turhuudesta (Ballad of everything's futility) 4:38
7. Mopolla tähtiin (Moped to stars) 3:10
8. Kiistän kaiken (I deny everything) 3:47
9. Kiirastulen kerubi (Purgatory's cherub) 4:10
10. Onnellinen hetki elämässä (Happy moment in life) 3:06
