= Akun tehdas =

Studio album by Eppu Normaali
- Released: 19 February 1980
- Genre: New wave

Eppu Normaali chronology
Maximum Jee & Jee (1979)	Akun tehdas (1980)	Elävänä Euroopassa (1980)

Akun tehdas (lit. 'Aku's factory') is the third studio album by Finnish rock band Eppu Normaali. It was released on 19 February 1980. On the album, the band switched from their punk rock style, seen in previous albums, to new wave. Mikko Saarela was not Eppu Normaali's bassist on the album, but he still wrote lyrics for it. Akun tehdas was the first album to include Mikko "Vaari" Nevalainen on bass.

The name Aku in Akun tehdas refers to the band's drummer Aku Syrjä, and the title was inspired by the 1970 Creedence Clearwater Revival (CCR) album Cosmo's Factory, which in turn was named after CCR's drummer Doug "Cosmo" Clifford and the warehouse where CCR used to play, "The Factory". The album's cover is also similar to the cover of Cosmo's Factory. The band's 1983 album Aku ja köyhät pojat (lit. 'Aku and the poor boys') was also named after a CCR album, Willy and the Poor Boys.

Akun tehdas has sold over 56,909 copies, and it went gold in 1980 and platinum in 1997.

"Akun tehdas" is also the name of Eppu Normaali Oy's versatile audiovisual facility located in Ylöjärvi, and Oy Aku's Factory Ltd is a company founded by Aku Syrjä in 2008.

== Track listing ==
1. "Vanha kellarissa valittaa" (lit. 'Old person complains in the cellar') 2:30
2. "Minun aurinkolasit" ('My sunglasses') 4:52
3. "Suomi-ilmiö" ('The Finland syndrome') 3:45
4. "Poltan loppuun tupakin" ('I finish my cigarette') 3:18
5. "Puhtoinen lähiöni" ('My clean suburbia') 3:53
6. "Akun tehdas" ('Aku's factory') 3:27
7. "Puhtoiset vesistömme" ('Our clean waters') 3:10
8. "Vanha poika" ('Old boy') 3:02
9. "Bob Dylan" 2:02
10. "Jäähyväiset rock'n'rollille" ('The goodbyes to rock'n'roll') 3:23
11. "Viimeinen funk" ('The last funk') 2:39
