= Juice Leskinen & Coitus Int (album) =

Studio album by Juice Leskinen & Coitus Int
- Released: November 1973
- Genre: Rock
- Label: Love Records
- Producer: Måns Groundstroem

Juice Leskinen & Coitus Int chronology
Juice Leskinen & Coitus Int (1973)	Per Vers, runoilija (1974)

Professional ratings
Review scores
Source	Rating
Soundi	4/5 stars

Juice Leskinen & Coitus Int is the debut album of the Finnish rock band of the same name, led by Juice Leskinen. It was released in 1973.

== Track listing ==
Music and lyrics by Leskinen, except where noted.

A-side

1. "Heinolassa jyrää"—2:12
2. "Sotilaspoika" _{(Leskinen, Runeberg)} -- 2:38
3. "Hengitä sisko" _{(Alatalo, Rinne)} -- 4:18
4. "Jeesus pelastaa"—3:14
5. "Hän sammuu"—2:58
6. "Imeläkivi" _{(Alatalo, Leskinen)} -- 3:18
7. "Zeppeliini"—3:13

B-side

1. "Oo! Raili" _{(Leskinen, Rinne)} -- 2:34
2. "Mari (savun kuningatar)"—3:43
3. "Cuba Libre" _{(Alatalo, Rinne)} -- 2:33
4. "Tulppaani"—2:38
5. "Lähde takaisin" _{(Alatalo, Rinne)} -- 4:25
6. "Nonamen laulu" _{(Alatalo, Leskinen)} -- 4:01
7. "Rokkaan"—3:14

== Personnel ==
- Juice Leskinen -- vocals, guitar, bass
- Mikko Alatalo—vocals, guitar, harmonica, violin
- Hessu Jokela—vocals, drums
- Max Möller—guitar
- Pena Penninkilampi—vocals, organ, accordion, bongos
- Harri Rinne—bass
- Eetu Tuominen—guitar, banjo, vocals
