= Per Vers, runoilija =

Studio album by Juice Leskinen & Coitus Int
- Released: 1974
- Genre: Rock
- Label: Love Records

Juice Leskinen chronology
Juice Leskinen & Coitus Int (1973)	Per Vers, runoilija (1974)	Juice ja Mikko (1975)

Professional ratings
Review scores
Source	Rating
Soundi	3/5 stars

Per Vers, runoilija is the second album of Juice Leskinen & Coitus Int, released in 1974.

== Track listing ==
All tracks by Juice Leskinen, unless where noted.

Side A

1. "Suihke kainaloon" - 1:28
2. "Hän hymyilee kuin lapsi" (Alatalo) - 3:37
3. "Panomies" - 2:31
4. "Keuhkoon pistää" (Alatalo, Harri Rinne) - 4:03
5. "Per Vers, runoilija" - 3:53
6. "Elämässä pitää olla runkkua" - 3:19
7. "Juankoski, Here I Come" - 2:15

Side B

1. "Odysseus" (Alatalo, Leskinen) - 4:21
2. "Tango Iloharjulla" - 1:49
3. "Kuopio tanssii ja soi" - 2:59
4. "Valtatie 9" - 2:19
5. "Leidi leidi" - 1:39
6. "Nuku" - 3:26
7. "Afroditen poika" - 2:21

== Personnel ==
- Juice Leskinen - guitar, vocals
- Mikko Alatalo - accordion, banjo, guitar, harmonica, vocals
- Eetu Tuominen - guitar, vocals
- Pena Penninkilampi - organ, vocals
- Juuso Nordlund - bass, vocals
- Juke Aronen - drums
