= The Saimaa Gesture =

- Original Finnish film poster
- Directed by: Aki Kaurismäki, Mika Kaurismäki
- Produced by: Aki Kaurismäki, Mika Kaurismäki
- Starring: Juice Leskinen; Martti Syrjä; Ismo Alanko
- Cinematography: Lasse Naukkarinen; Timo Salminen; Toni Sulzbeck; Olli Varja
- Edited by: Antti Kari
- Music by: Eppu Normaali; Hassisen Kone; Juice Leskinen Slam
- Production company: Villealfa Filmproductions
- Release date: 11 September 1981
- Running time: 128 minutes
- Country: Finland
- Language: Finnish

The Saimaa Gesture (Finnish: Saimaa-ilmiö) is a 1981 film by Finnish directors Aki and Mika Kaurismäki. It is a documentary about three Finnish rock groups aboard the steamboat SS Heinävesi on their tour around Lake Saimaa.

== The film ==
The film was shot from 31 May to 7 June on the 1981 "Tuuliajolla" tour by groups Eppu Normaali, Hassisen Kone and Juice Leskinen Slam. The Saimaa Gesture features artist interviews, more than 20 live performances and several acoustic songs filmed aboard the steamer.

The original title Saimaa-ilmiö (The Saimaa Syndrome) is an adaptation of the Finnish translation of the 1979 thriller film The China Syndrome (Finnish: Kiina-ilmiö). It could have been further inspired by the Eppu Normaali song Suomi-ilmiö, which was named similarly.

== Soundtrack ==
The soundtrack album Tuuliajolla was released by Poko Rekords. It was re-released on CD in 1993 and 2007.
