= Alho =

Alho is a Finnish surname. It was registered by the Suomalaisuuden Liitto in 1930 and has 1,811 known bearers. Notable people with the surname include:

- Aku Alho (born 1997), Finnish ice hockey player
- Arja Alho (born 1954), Finnish politician
- Johan Alho (1907–1982), Finnish footballer and a football referee
- Nikolai Alho (born 1993), Finnish footballer
- Olli Alho (1919–2005), Finnish hurdler
