= Nummela =

Nummela may refer to:

- Nummela (Vihti), the central district of the Finnish municipality of Vihti
  - Nummela Airfield, see list of airports in Finland
- 2502 Nummela, an asteroid named after the town
- Nummela (album), an album by Anssi Kela, named after the town

== People with the surname ==
- Matti Nummela (born 1955), Finnish sport shooter
- Petri Nummela (born 1971), Finnish sport shooter
