= Popeda =

Finnish rock band

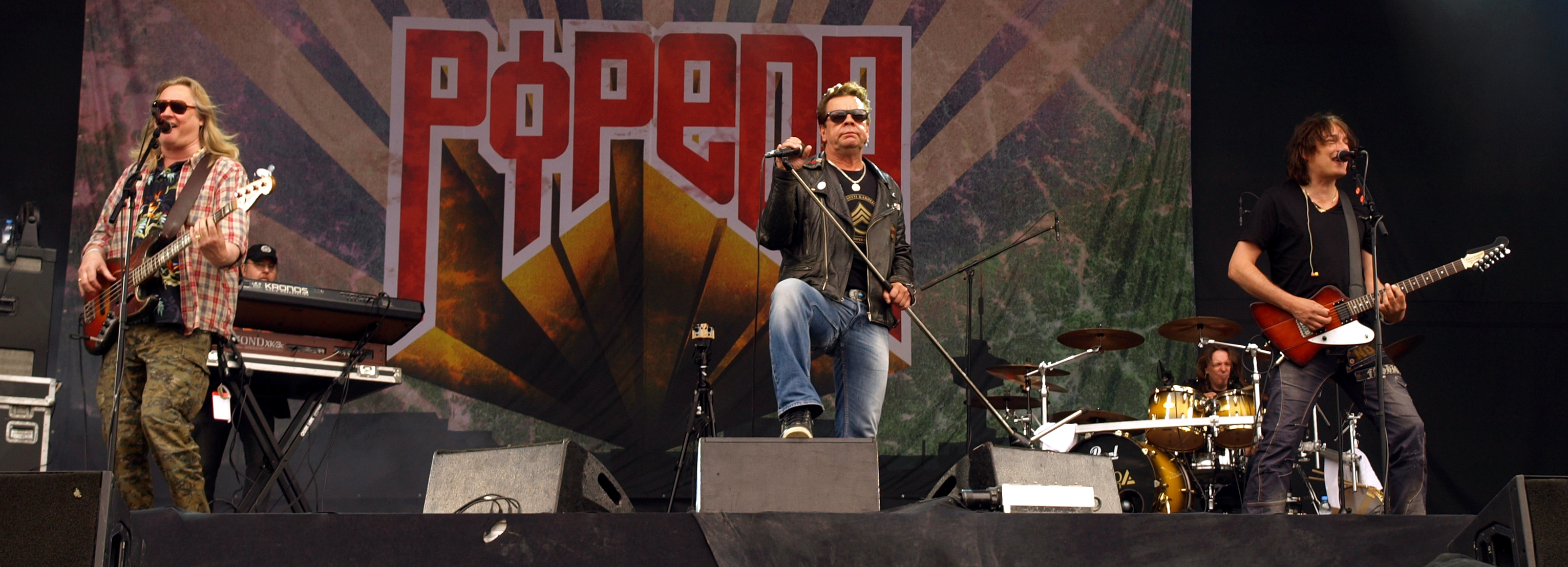
- Popeda performing at Provinssirock 2013

Background information
- Origin: Tampere, Finland
- Genres: Rock, hard rock, manserock, pub rock
- Years active: 1977–present
- Labels: Poko Rekords
- Members: Olli Herman; Costello Hautamäki; Pate Kivinen; Lacu Lahtinen; Alex Hautamäki
- Past members: Pate Mustajärvi; Ilari "Ilpo" Ainiala; Tapani "Arwo" Mikkonen; Ari Puukka; Kai Holm; Risto "Eebo" Lehtinen; Jyrki Melartin; Kari Holm; Eero Pekkonen; Jukka "Jukkis" Järvinen; Timo Tapaninen; Markku Petander; Arto Rautajoki; Jani Kemppinen
- Website: popeda.fi

Popeda is a Finnish rock band hailing from Tampere and one of the staples of Manserock. It was founded in November 1977 by Pauli "Pate" Mustajärvi and Ilari "Ilpo" Ainiala, who were joined by Arwo Mikkonen, Matti Palmunen and Ari Puukka. Mustajärvi, the last original member, left the band in 2023. Following Mustajärvi's departure, the band consists of Costello Hautamäki, Alex Hautamäki, Lacu Lahtinen and Pate Kivinen.

Epe Helenius, who signed the band for Poko Rekords in 1977, called the band "Finnish Rolling Stones". Mustajärvi has cited The Who, Black Sabbath and Neil Young as the band's musical inspirations. Musically their style is a combination of rock 'n' roll, with humorous lyrics by their vocalist Pate Mustajärvi, often concerning girls, cars and drinking.

The name of the band was the idea of Ainiala. An ironic take on another rock band called Rock Cadillac, the band was initially called "Punk Rock Pobeda" (from the cheap Soviet Pobeda car, meaning "victory"), which was quickly shortened and stylized to Popeda.

In 2014, the band received the Suomi-palkinto cultural award of the Finnish Ministry of Education and Culture.

== Members ==
=== Current ===
- Costello Hautamäki – guitar, vocals (1982–present)
- Pate Kivinen – keyboards (2008–present)
- Lacu Lahtinen – drums, vocals (2008–present)
- Alex Hautamäki - bass, vocals (2021–present)
- Olli Herman - vocals (2024–present)

=== Past ===
- Pate Mustajärvi – vocals (1977–2023) (died 2025)
- Ilari "Ilpo" Ainiala – bass guitar (1977–1979)
- Tapani "Arwo" Mikkonen – guitar (1977–1986)
- Ari Puukka – guitar (1977–1981)
- Kai Holm – drums (1977–1983)
- Risto "Eebo" Lehtinen – bass guitar (1979–1981)
- Jyrki K. Melartin – bass guitar, vocals (1980–1990, 1995–2021)
- Kari Holm – drums (1983–2000)
- Eero Pekkonen – keyboards (1983–1985)
- Jukka "Jukkis" Järvinen – keyboards (1986–2000)
- Timo Tapaninen – guitar (1986–1990)
- Markku Petander – bass guitar, vocals (1990–1995)
- Arto Rautajoki – drums (2001–2007)
- Jani Kemppinen – keyboards (2001–2007)

== Discography ==
=== Albums ===
- Popeda (1978)
- Raswaa koneeseen (1980) (Grease to the Machine)
- Hullut koirat (1981) (Mad Dogs)
- Raakaa voimaa (1981) (Live) (Raw Power)
- Mustat enkelit (1982) (Black Angels)
- Kaasua... (1983) (Gas...)
- Harasoo (1984)
- Pohjantähden alla (1985) (Under the North Star)
- Huilut suorina (1986) (Live) (Flutes Straight)
- Ei oo valoo (1987) (There's No Light)
- Hallelujaa (1988) (Hallelujah)
- Kans'an Popeda (1990) (Nation's Popeda)
- Svoboda (1992) (Freedom)
- H.Ö.N.Ö. (1994) (F.O.O.L.)
- Live at the BBC (1995)
- 500 cc (1997)
- Vieraissa (1999) (Sleeping around)
- Just! (2001) (Right!)
- Häkää! (2005) (Carbon Monoxide!)
- Täydelliset miehet (2008) (Perfect Men)
- Pitkä Kuuma Kesä 2010 – Live (2010) (Long Hot Summer 2010 – Live)
- Voitto (2011) (Victory)
- Museorekisterissä / Museorekisterissä – Karvanopat ja Wunderbaum (2013) (Registered Historic Vehicle – Fuzzy dices and Wunderbaum)
- Haista...Popeda (2017) (Smell...Popeda)

=== Compilations ===
- 15 GT Golden Turpo (1986)
- Poko-klassikko: Popeda (1987) (Poko-Classics: Popeda)
- Peethelemin Pesäveikot (nopein saa) (1993) (Nest brothers of Betlehem (Fastest Gets))
- Hittejä, kersantti Karoliina! (1997) (Hits, Sergeant Karoliina!)
- Pelkkää juhlaa – 25v. Juhlakokoelma (Nothing but Celebration – 25th Anniversary Celebration Collection)
- 30-vuotinen sota 1977–2007 (2007) (30 Year War 1977–2007)

=== DVDs ===
- Hyvää iltaa, Tampere (2002) (Good Evening, Tampere)
- Pitkä Kuuma Kesä 2010 – Live (2010) (Long Hot Summer 2010 – Live)

=== Singles ===
- Hei mies / Mönkiäislaulu PIS 006, 1978
- Erkki ja Leena / Sammakkalaulu PIS 008, 1978
- Suuret setelit / Lauri Lutavuori PIS 022, 1979
- Huummetta / Kouluun PIS 033, 1979
- Mörrimöykky / Bebobbahobbin PIS 057, 1980
- Minä elän / Silimiklasikyy (live) PIS 084, 1981
- Minä elän / Silimiklasikyy (live) / Luvattu maa (live) PIS 12-084, 1981
- Kalteriblues / Onnellinen mies PIS 103, 1982
- Yö / Maailma palaa PIS 109, 1982
- Delilah / Yks kysta kimma PIS 115, 1983
- Kaasua, komisaario Peppone / Viimeinen mohikaani AUTOM 5, 1983
- Kaasua, komisaario Peppone PEPPONE 1, 1983
- Matkalla Alabamaan / Nyrkki-Kyllikki PIS 129, 1984
- Matkalla Alabamaan (remix) / Sielun Veljet: Aina nälkä PROMO 12-1, 1984
- Sukset (vaikeata tämä hiihtäminen) / Raz, Dva, Tri PIS 140, 1984
- Palle and the Boys / Hjulapata PIS 152, 1985
- Palle and the Boys / Hjulapata / Sukset (vaikeata tämä hiihtäminen) (4x10 km:n viestihiihtomixaus) PIS 152-12, 1985
- Kuuma kesä / Tuomas parka PIS 158, 1985
- Tää on se yö / Mikä vika mussa on PIS 176, 1986
- Eläinten vallankumous / Omia ollaan PIS 191, 1986
- Kellot lyö / Potkurilakkirock PIS 195, 1986
- Maailmankaikkeuden suvijenkka / Ranttalitytön tärinät PIS 214, 1987
- Bandiittipolkka / Luumäkirock PIS 219, 1987
- EppuPopedaNormaali: 20 vuotta sikana / Hyvä kankkunen PIS 224, 1987
- Raaka-Arska & Räp-Popeda: Muumi Muumi / Hei mies -räp PIS 229, 1987
- Optinen O / Valkoisessa huoneessa PIS 231, 1988
- Sä lähdit taas / Kovan pojan blues PIS 253, 1988
- Sä lähdit taas / 4711 AUTOM 19, 1989
- Paulin taikakaulin / Heavy lutaa PIS 262, 1989
- Lilli Kupponen / Nysse tulee / Kuuma kokardi PROMOCD 2, 1990
- Enkeliblues / Nysse tulee AUTOM 21, 1990
- Punaista ja makeaa / Kotiin PIS 290, 1991
- Kirje / Irmeli PIS 303, 1991
- Kersantti Karoliina / Mää ja Tapparan mies PROMOCD 5, 1992
- Kersantti Karoliina / Mää ja Tapparan mies PIS 308, 1992
- Repe ja Lissu / Sen kunniaksi PIS 314, 1992
- Hjulapata / Omia ollaan / Kovan pojan blues PSCD 30, 1993
- Siankorvaa ja raanavettä PROMOCD 8, 1994
- Oodi makkaralle PROMOCD 9, 1994
- Siankorvaa ja raanavettä AUTOM 24, 1994
- Tahdotko mut tosiaan / Pelkosenniemen poika PSCD 47, 1994
- Mustameri ja mies / Mannaa mammonaa PROMOCD 26, 1997
- Paperitähdet / Mayday Mayday PSCD 127, 1999
- Mustaa / No niin tottakai PSCD 133, 1999
- Beibin kanssa Irlantiin / Entisestä pois PSCD 173, 2001
- Tohtori Mustajärvi PSCD 177, 2001
- Hilipatipippaa / Onko vielä aikaa PSCD 184, 2001
- Kakskytä centtiä / Pakko saada BMW PSCD 200, 2002
- Ei lasten käsiin PSCD 237, 2004
- Ikurin mimmi PSCD 259, 2005
- Katsastuslaulu (Popeda) / Tango Pelargonia (Trio Mukavat) PSCD 268, 2006
- Reino PSCD 288, 2007
- Kuutamohullu PSCD 295, 2008
- Onhan päivä vielä huomennakin PSCD 301, 2008
- Elän itselleni PSCD 304, 2008
- Hääkellot soi PSCD 307, 2011
- Bermudan kolmio, 2012
- Onko saunan takana tilaa?, 2016
- Lihaa ja perunaa, 2017
- Sha-la-la / Ikävä keikalle (feat. Klamydia, 2021)

== See also ==
- List of best-selling music artists in Finland
