= Lapinlahden Linnut =

Finnish band and comedy group

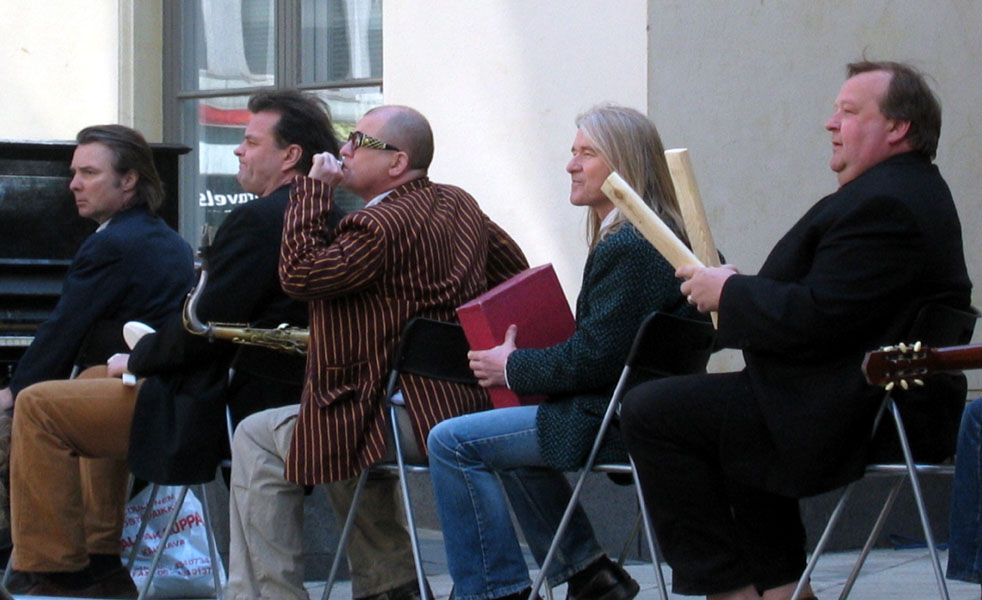
- From the left: Pekka Hedkrok, Tapio Liinoja, Timo Eränkö, Matti Jaaranen and Mikko Kivinen

Background information
- Origin: Helsinki, Finland
- Genres: Comedy rock
- Years active: 1983–2013
- Website: lapinlahdenlinnut.fi

Lapinlahden Linnut ("Birds of Lapinlahti") is a Finnish band and comedy group, founded in the spring of 1983, which played humorous rock/pop music. The band started as buskers. In the beginning, the band used some original instruments such as a ring binder, and they still use an empty beer crate in their music. Lapinlahden Linnut have made seven TV series, the third being Maailman kahdeksan ihmettä, participating in the Montreaux Rose d'Or festival, under the name "Rampton Birds Show: Eight Wonders of the World". In 2006 the band returned to its old 1990–1991 lineup. The band held its farewell tour in 2013.

== Members ==
- Pekka Hedkrok — vocals, keyboard, 1983 -
- Matti Jaaranen — vocals, trumpet, 1983 -
- Tapio Liinoja - vocals, 1983–1994, 2006 -
- Markku Toikka - vocals, 1983–1990, 2006 -
- Mikko Kivinen - vocals, 1983–1992, 2006 -
- Hannu Lemola - drums, 1986–1997, 2006 -
- Veli-Pekka Oinonen - guitar, 1989–1995, 2006 -

=== Former ===
- Ari "Arvid" Kettunen - keyboard, 1983–1988
- Heikki "Hiski" Salomaa - vocals, 1983 - d. 1.7.2003
- Timo Eränkö — vocals, saxophone, 1983 - d. 29.12.2021
- Jan Noponen - drums, 1983–1986
- Ari Wahlsten — vocals, 1994–2006
- Pekka Rechardt - guitar, 1995–2002
- Harri "Hate" Kinnunen — drums, 1997–2005
- Pekka Virtanen — guitar, keyboard, bass, 2002–2005
- Aarni Kivinen — vocals, saxophone, 2003–2006
- Sami Kariluoma — drums, 2005–2006
- Jaku Havukainen — guitar, 2005–2006

== Discography ==
=== Albums ===
- Lapinlahden Linnut (1985)
- Jep (1986)
- Vihreä Gorilla (1987)
- Lauluja Nuppilasta (1988)
- Parhaat (1988)
- Elämä Janottaa (1989)
- Ei Oikotietä Sankaruuteen 1983–1989 (1989)
- Tähdet Kertovat (1990)
- Grrr! (1992)
- Köyhän Taivas (1994)
- Sulkasatoa Osa I (1994)
- Sulkasatoa Osa II (1995)
- Tyttö Huutaa Hii! (1996)
- Kansandances (1997)
- Iso Muna (1999)
- Höyhenet Pöllyää! (2000)
- Kaikkien Aikojen Parhaat (2002)
- Kolmas Jalka Haudassa (2003)
- Pienvikaisten paratiisi (2005)
- Lintuinfluenssa vol 1 & vol 2 (2006)
- Etiäppäin (2007)

=== Singles ===
- Lipputangon nuppi / Sisäinen ahdistus
- Tapasin naisen / Sateet tulevat
- Tavallinen Jörndonner / Pikkumiesten laulu
- Rakas, ukulele soi / Tenukeppi'
- Älä pure mun ananasta / Hip hop
- Elämä janottaa / Tuoli kaatuu
- Se ei käy / Aino kirjoittaa
- Vihtaasi on kustu / Ruma
- Älä viskaa mua pihalle / Sedät jaksaa heilua
- Otto ja pano / Hellä Ulla
- Karvaisen kiitoksen metsästäjä / Aimon virsi
- Se tekee gutaa / Tiiviö
- Helppoa elämää / Hengessä Kollaan
- Sä teet mut hulluksi / Kalliossa
- Vanha suomalaisten poikain vitutuslaulu sekä ko. kappaleen remix ja dub mix
- Siittiöt (Siitosen veljekset) / Työtön, hullu ja eläkeläinen
- Köyhän taivas / Jos on eläin
- Köyhän taivas / Viheltävä Ville ja Pekka Petomaani
- Kaivollinen Kossua / Nyt sitä saa / Perse
- Enää en sano sanaakaan / Sen pitää olla Raimoa
- Älä itke, älä sure / Ei liian syvälle
- XL miehiä sekä XXL ja XXXL -remixit
- Pekka ja Justiina / XL-miehiä
- Voisinko olla minä / Kaljasta kaljaan
- Mun puutarhassa sekä Mun puutarhassa -remix
- Kilttejä lapsia
- Kesäapina
- Sä oot kaikkea kumista ja muovista
- Äideistä rumin
- Kolmas jalka haudassa / Suomi takaisin
- AIAIAIVOIVOIVOI
- Tänä kesänä perkele!
- Vedä mua otsikkoon
- Vedä lärvit, Matti Vanhanen
- Naiset vaihtaa mua kuin paitaa / Tyttö dynamiittivyössä
- Keski-ikä on syvältä (promo)
- Etiäppäin! (promo)
- Mun muriseva koirani Iines (promo)
- Takkatulen ääressä / Runo josta ei tullut mitään (promo)

== TV-series ==
- Kyllä elämä on ihanaa (1987)
- Seitsemän kuolemansyntiä (1988)
- Maailman kahdeksan ihmettä (1990)
- Kuudesti laukeava (1992)
- Lapinlahden Linnut Show (1993)
- Lapinlahden Linnut (1995)
- Muuttuuko ihminen? (2006)

== Radio show ==
- Tieteellinen testiryhmä

== Music videos ==
- Lipputangon nuppi
- Pikkumiesten laulu
- Elämässä täytyy kosia
- Heti mulle kaikki tänne nyt
- Älä viskaa mua pihalle
- Älä pure mun ananasta
- Kalliossa
- Kesäapina
- Jos on eläin
- Köyhän taivas
- Pekka ja Justiina
- Kaikkea kumista ja muovista (2000)
- Hiljaisten miesten baari (2003)
- Vedä lärvit Matti Vanhanen (2005)
- Keski-ikä on syvältä (2006)
