= Känkkäränkkä =

Känkkäränkkä is a Finnish children's song by Mikko Alatalo and Harri Rinne. The song was recorded by Alatalo in 1981 for his album Eläimiä suomalaismetsissä. The song is about a mischievous little witch, who entices children to become angry and harass others. The witch Känkkäränkkä is so small that adults can not even see her. Jope Ruonansuu has made a parody of the song called Menkkaränkkä, which was published on his album Lomakiertue.

The heroine of the song, the small witch Känkkäränkkä, was not invented by Alatalo and Rinne, but was invented in the 1970s by speech therapeutist and children's book author Annami Poivaara. Känkkäränkkä fairy tales written by Poivaara were published in collections such as Unihiekkaa, Unilintu and Pikkunoita Känkkäränkkä. Poivaara recollects: "I wrote three books about a small witch, that Mikko Alatalo read to his children and the character started to develop in his mind."
