= Repullinen hittejä =

Compilation album by Eppu Normaali
- Released: 12 September 1996
- Recorded: 1978–1993
- Language: Finnish
- Label: Poko Rekords
- Producer: Mikko "Pantse" Syrjä

Eppu Normaali chronology
| Onko vielä pitkä matka jonnekin? (1994) | Repullinen hittejä (1996) | Reppu 2 - toinen repullinen kuolemattomia Eppu-klassikoita (2003) |

Repullinen hittejä (A Bagful of Hits) is a compilation album of Finnish rock group Eppu Normaali. The album was produced by Mikko "Pantse" Syrjä, one of the guitarists of the band. It was released on 12 September 1996 through Poko Rekords. Repullinen hittejä debuted at number one on the Finnish Albums Chart and, with 110 weeks until 2007, became the third-longest charting album of all time. It is also the second-best-selling album of all time in Finland with sales exceeding 250,000 copies, which has granted it a sextuple-platinum certification.

== Track listing ==
=== CD One ===
1. "Murheellisten laulujen maa"
2. "Tahroja paperilla"
3. "Nyt reppu jupiset riimisi rupiset"
4. "Afrikka, sarvikuonojen maa"
5. "Voi kuinka me sinua kaivataan"
6. "Suomi-ilmiö"
7. "Lensin matalalla 2"
8. "Kun olet poissa"
9. "Kitara, taivas ja tähdet"
10. "Linnunradan laidalla"
11. "Nuori poika"
12. "Taivaassa perseet tervataan"
13. "En saa mielestä sinua"
14. "Hipit rautaa"

=== CD Two ===
1. "Akun tehdas"
2. "Vuonna '85"
3. "Urheiluhullu"
4. "Baarikärpänen"
5. "Njet njet"
6. "Pimeyden tango"
7. "Jee jee"
8. "Näin kulutan aikaa"
9. "Vihreän joen rannalla (kauan sitten)"
10. "Puhtoinen lähiöni"
11. "Joka päivä ja joka ikinen yö"
12. "Rääväsuita ei haluta Suomeen"
13. "Poliisi pamputtaa taas"
14. "Näinhän täällä käy"

== Personnel ==
=== Eppu Normaali ===
- Martti Syrjä – lead vocals
- Mikko "Pantse" Syrjä – rhythm and lead guitars, backing vocals, lead vocals on "Baarikärpänen"
- Juha Torvinen – rhythm and lead guitars, backing vocals
- Mikko Nevalainen – bass guitar, backing vocals on tracks 1–6, 9, 10, 12, 13 (CD One) and 1, 2, 4, 6, 8–11 (CD Two)
- Sami Ruusukallio – bass guitar, backing vocals on tracks 7, 8, 14 (CD One) and 3, 14 (CD Two)
- Mikko Saarela – bass guitar, backing vocals on tracks 11 (CD One) and 5, 7, 12, 13 (CD Two)
- Aku Syrjä – drums

With

- Eero "Safka" Pekkonen – accordion, piano and string arrangements

== Charts and certifications ==
=== Weekly charts ===
| Chart (1996) | Peak position |
|---|---|
| Finnish Albums (Suomen virallinen lista) | 1 |

=== Year-end charts ===
| Chart (2000) | Position |
|---|---|
| Finnish Albums (Suomen virallinen lista) | 200 |

=== Certifications ===
| Region | Certification | Certified units/sales |
|---|---|---|
| Finland (Musiikkituottajat) | 6× Platinum | 250,377 |

== See also ==
- List of best-selling albums in Finland
