= XV yö (Tauko III) =

Studio album by Juice Leskinen Slam
- Released: 1980
- Genre: Suomirock
- Length: 36:54
- Label: Hi-Hat
- Producer: Juice Leskinen and Tommi Liuhala

Juice Leskinen Slam chronology
Tauko II	XV yö (Tauko III)	Kuusessa ollaan

XV yö (Tauko III) is a 1980 studio album by Finnish rock band Juice Leskinen Slam. It was produced by Tommi Liuhala and Juice Leskinen. The album lasts 36 minutes and 54 seconds.

The album was included in Robert Dimery's 2006 book 1001 Albums You Must Hear Before You Die.

== Track listing ==
=== A Side ===
1. "Rock'n Roll'n Blues'n Jazz" – 3.12
2. "Viidestoista yö" – 4.09
3. "Pieni kalmistosarja" – 4.28
  1. "Kuollut mies"
  2. "Ex-vainajan muistelmat"
  3. "Ruumishuone goodbye"
4. "Haetarirock" – 3.20
5. "Edestakaisin (Laihia–Heinäpää)" – 3.17

=== B Side ===
1. "Outoon valoon" – 3.14
2. "Mene kotiin" – 2.59
3. "Mies joka rakastaa itseään" – 2.56
4. "Ei elämästä selviä hengissä" – 2.27
5. "Naisellinen nainen" – 2.57
6. "Lauloin miehen maisemaan" – 3.50

== Chart positions ==
- Finland: #6 (February 1980)
