= Take Care of Your Scarf, Tatiana =

- DVD cover
- Directed by: Aki Kaurismäki
- Written by: Aki Kaurismäki; Sakke Järvenpää
- Produced by: Aki Kaurismäki
- Starring: Kati Outinen; Matti Pellonpää; Kirsi Tykkyläinen; Mato Valtonen; Elina Salo
- Cinematography: Timo Salminen
- Edited by: Aki Kaurismäki
- Production company: Sputnik
- Distributed by: Finnkino
- Release date: 14 January 1994
- Running time: 62 minutes
- Countries: Finland; Germany
- Languages: Finnish; Russian

Take Care of Your Scarf, Tatiana (Finnish: Pidä huivista kiinni, Tatjana), also translated as Take Care of Your Scarf, Tatjana, is a 1994 Finnish/German film directed, produced and co-written by Aki Kaurismäki. The film tells the story of two shy and unaccomplished middle-aged men who run away from their mothers' homes and drive aimlessly on the back roads of Finland.

== Plot ==
Valto (Mato Valtonen) lives with his mother, who runs a clothing business. Valto is seen sewing clothes for his mother at the beginning of the film. When he discovers the coffee has run out, and his mother refuses to make him a new one straight away, he locks her in a cupboard, steals her money and goes out. Valto finds Reino (Matti Pellonpää), who has been fixing Valto's car. They then go on a road trip with no apparent destination. With music coming out of a in-car vinyl player of Valto's car and Reino's story about how he got into some legal trouble after he punched someone, the two seemingly enjoy the road trip.

When they make a stop at a bar, they meet Tatiana (Kati Outinen) from Estonia and Klavdia (Kirsi Tykkyläinen) from Russia. Tatiana and Klavdia ask Valto and Reino to drive them to a harbour. Since Valto and Reino's road trip does not have a clear destination at the first place, Valto and Reino agree to take Tatiana and Klavdia.

Throughout the journey, Valto has been drinking coffee and Reino drinking vodka. Although Reino is reserved in his nature, he sits down next to Tatiana during one of the stops of the journey. Tatiana relaxes her head on Reino's shoulder. The film suggests the two have fallen in love at this point.

At the end of the film, Reino and Tatiana remain in love with each other and live together in Estonia whereas Valto returns home, releases his mother out of the cupboard and resumes sewing clothes.

== Cast ==
- Kati Outinen as Tatjana
- Matti Pellonpää as Reino
- Kirsi Tykkyläinen as Klavdia
- Mato Valtonen as Valdemar 'Valto' Reiman
- Elina Salo as Hotel Receptionist
- Irma Junnilainen as Valto's Mother
- Veikko Lavi as Vepe
- Pertti Husu as Pepe
- Viktor Vassel as Bus Driver
- Carl-Erik Calamnius as Petrol Station Attendant
- Atte Blom as Barkeeper 1
- Mauri Sumén as Barkeeper 2

== Reception ==
Time Out called the film a "beautifully economic anti-romantic road comedy... Marvellously observed and understated".

== Literature ==
- Andrei Plakhov, Elena Plakhova. Take Care of Your Scarf, Tatiana (1994) // Aki Kaurismaki. The Last Romantic. Films, interviews, scripts, short story. — M.: New Literary Review, 2006. — pp. 105-111. — 296 p. — (Film texts). — 1,500 copies. — ISBN 5-86793-479-9.
