= Aku Aku =

Aku Aku may refer to:

- Akuaku, a former settlement in New Zealand
- Aku-Aku (mythology), beings in Easter Island mythology
- Aku Aku (character), in the Crash Bandicoot series
- Aku-Aku, a book by Thor Heyerdahl
- Aku-Aku (film), a Norwegian documentary film about Thor Heyerdahl
- "Aku-Aku", a song by Styx from the album Pieces of Eight (1978)
