= Nummela (album) =

Studio album by Anssi Kela
- Released: March 2001
- Genre: Rock, pop rock
- Language: Finnish

Anssi Kela chronology
Nummela (2001)	Suuria kuvioita (2003)

Nummela is the debut album by the Finnish singer Anssi Kela. Released in March 2001, Nummela is the best-charting album in Finland with 16 weeks atop and currently ranks 13th on the list of best-selling albums of all time in Finland.

== Charts and certifications ==
=== Weekly charts ===
Chart (2001)	Peak position
Finnish Albums (Suomen virallinen lista)	1

=== Year-end charts ===
Chart (2001)	Position
Finnish Albums (Suomen virallinen lista)	1
Chart (2002)	Position
Finnish Albums (Suomen virallinen lista)	74

=== Certifications ===
Region	Certification	Certified units/sales
Finland (Musiikkituottajat)	5× Platinum	157,199

== See also ==
- List of best-selling albums in Finland
