= Aku (given name) =

Aku is a given name, a Finnish version of the name Augustus. Notable people with the name include:

- Aku Alho (born 1997), Finnish ice hockey player
- Aku Hirviniemi (born 1983), Finnish actor
- Aku Kadogo, American choreographer, director, actress, and educator
- Aku Kauste (born 1979), Finnish curler
- Aku Kestilä (born 1994), Finnish ice hockey player
- August "Aku" Kiuru (1922–2009), Finnish cross-country skier and Olympic medalist
- Aku Korhonen (1892–1960), Finnish actor
- Aku Louhimies (born 1968), Finnish film director and screenwriter
- Aku Päiviö (1879–1967), Finnish Canadian journalist, poet and socialist
- Aku Partanen (born 1991), Finnish racewalker
- Aku Pellinen (born 1993), Finnish racing driver

== Fictional characters ==
- Aku Ankka, (Finnish for Donald Duck), a Finnish weekly Disney comics magazine
- Aku, the main antagonist of the whole Samurai Jack series
