= Eppu Normaali =

Finnish rock band

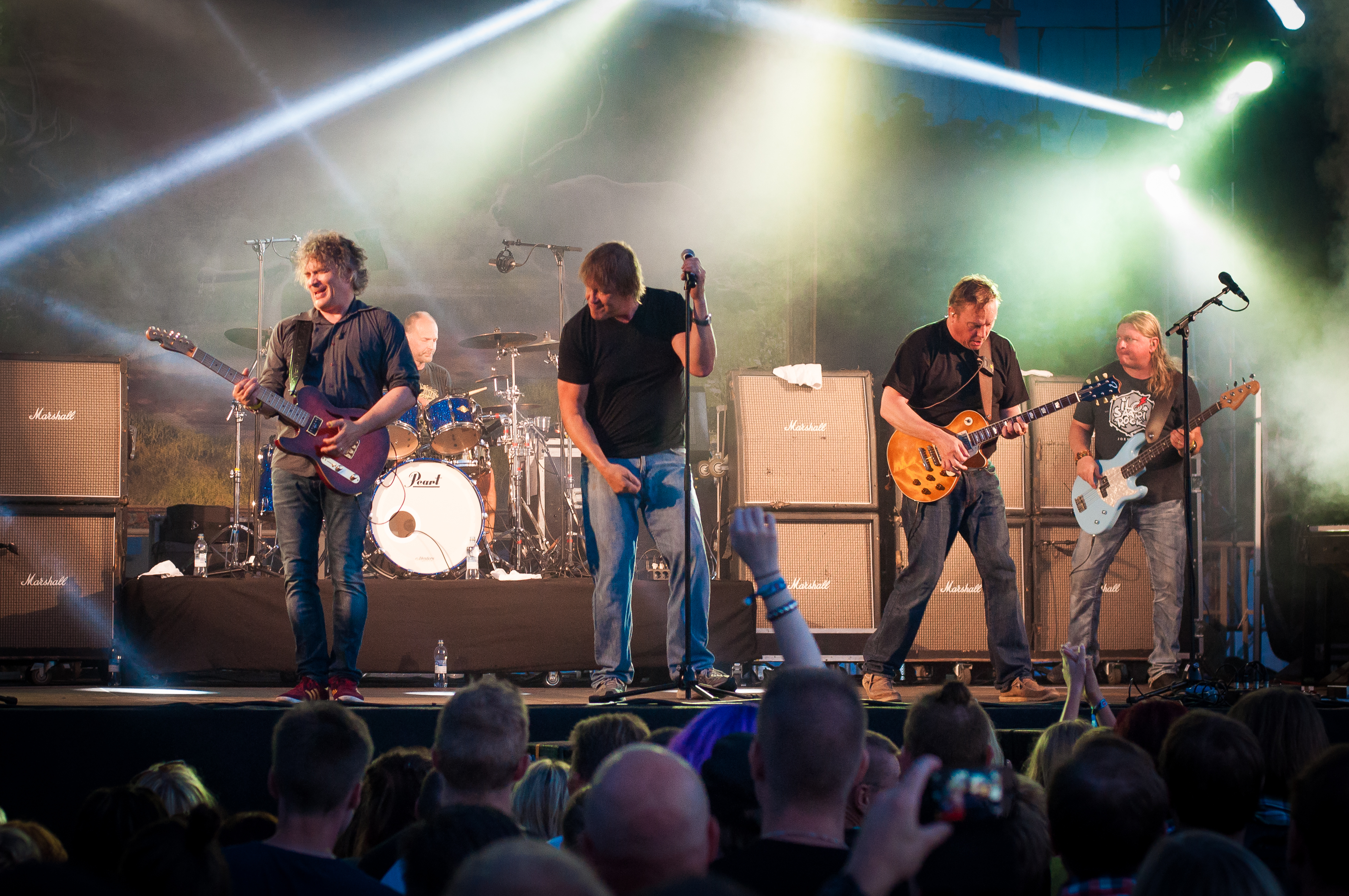
- Eppu Normaali at Ratina Stadium on 14 August 2014.

Background information
- Origin: Ylöjärvi, Finland
- Genres: suomirock, manserock, punk rock (early), pop punk (early), power pop, pop rock, new wave, blues-rock, heartland rock, roots rock, rock and roll
- Years active: 1976–present
- Labels: Poko, Svart, Backstage Rock Shop, Lipposen Levy ja Kasetti, EMI
- Members: Martti Syrjä; Mikko "Pantse" Syrjä; Aku Syrjä; Juha Torvinen; Sami Ruusukallio
- Past members: Mikko Saarela; Mikko "Vaari" Nevalainen
- Website: www.eppunormaali.fi

Eppu Normaali is one of the most popular rock bands in Finland and one of the key representatives of genre called suomirock. The band formed in 1976 in Ylöjärvi, a small town near Tampere. The band is the best-selling music artist in Finland, with certified sales of nearly two million records, and it has also gained success especially in the use of the Finnish language in rock lyrics. In addition to their studio albums, Eppu Normaali also released live records, DVDs, and over 20 singles.

Eppu Normaali's most famous songs include "Vuonna '85" (In the Year '85), "Kitara, taivas ja tähdet" (The Guitar, the Sky and the Stars), "Murheellisten laulujen maa" (The Land of Sorrowful Songs), "Pimeyden tango" (Tango of Darkness), "Suolaista sadetta" (Salty Rain) and "Tahroja paperilla" (Stains on Paper).

== History ==
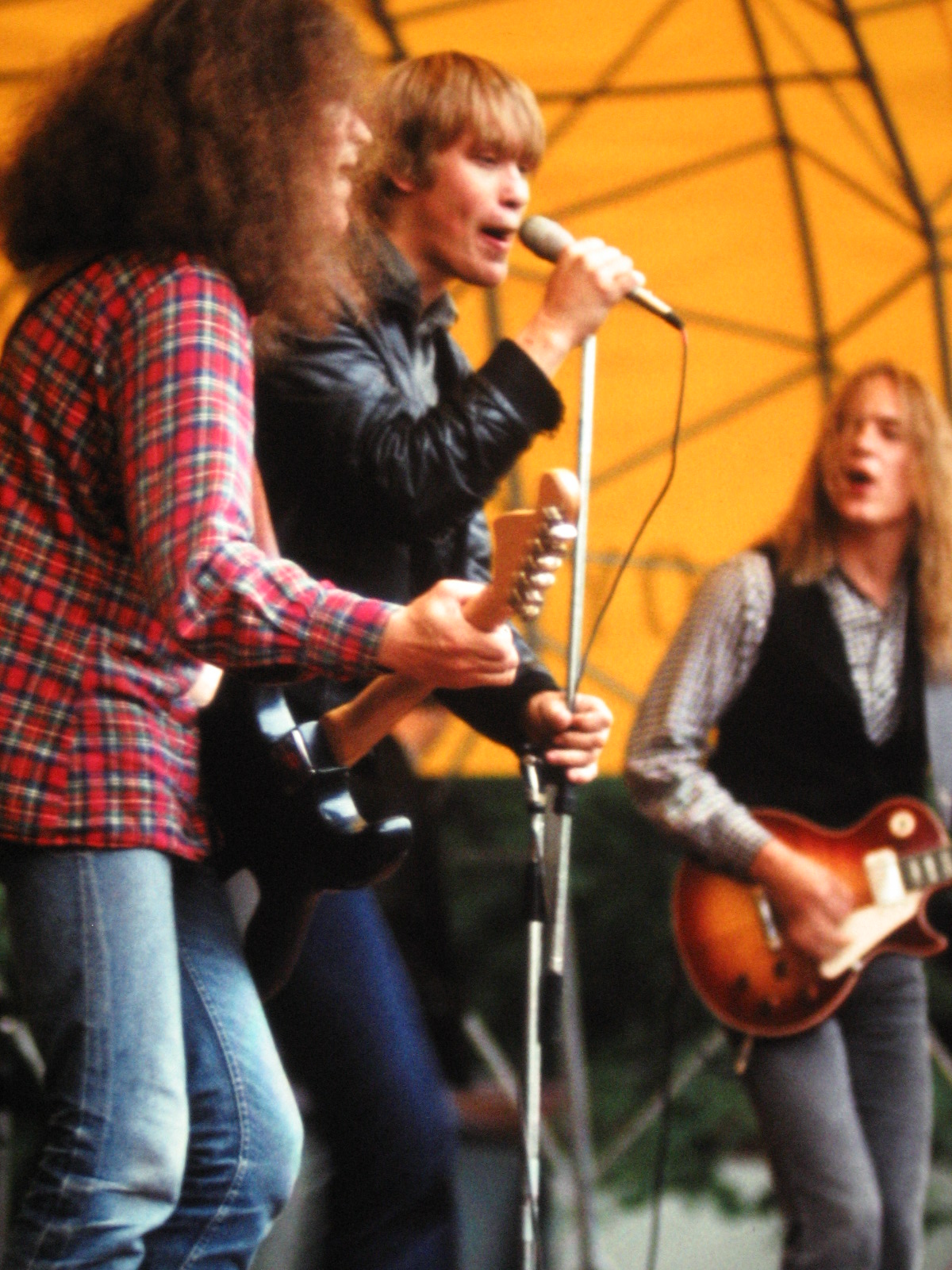
Eppu Normaali at the Kaivopuisto in 1980

The members of the original band were Juha Torvinen (guitar), Mikko Saarela (bass), Aku Syrjä (drums), and brothers Martti Syrjä (vocals) and Mikko "Pantse" Syrjä (guitar). (The brothers are the sons of accomplished writers Kirsi Kunnas and Jaakko Syrjä). In 1979, bassist Mikko Saarela left the band, and Mikko Nevalainen played bass with Eppu Normaali until 1989. The current bassist is Sami Ruusukallio.

The band took its name from a character in the Mel Brooks movie Young Frankenstein, and the subtitler translated the name of the character Abby Normal (abnormal) into the Finnish equivalent Eppu Normaali (epänormaali, roughly 'abnormal'; a Finnish equivalent of the original play with words).

In 1977, the band participated in a local rock music competition. Finnish folk/pop legend Juice Leskinen was present and issued a demand that they "must win", but the judges were unimpressed—the band did not win. The band began sending demos to various record companies and they were soon signed to Poko Rekords.

They initially released albums in a punk pop style that gained favourable reviews, but the band did not gain mainstream acceptance until 1984 with what had evolved into a more AOR-oriented music style. Rupisia Riimejä, Karmeita Tarinoita was released in 1984, and it was followed by Kahdeksas Ihme in 1985 and Valkoinen Kupla in 1986. This trio of albums were all hits, with combined sales of over 300,000 copies. Kahdeksas Ihme is their top-selling non-greatest hits record to date.

Although their albums all sold well, the band's pace slowed down after the release of their 10th album, Imperiumin Vastaisku, in 1988. It took two years for the release of their 11th studio album, Historian Suurmiehiä, which came out in 1990. Despite this, the album contained several hits, including one of their best known songs, "Tahroja Paperilla". Three more years later, in 1993, they released Studio Etana, which became their last studio album for eleven years. The band came close to breaking up, citing "lacking inspiration" as the primary cause. Their 1996 release Repullinen hittejä, a greatest hits compilation sold over 240,000 copies, reaching the top of the Finnish charts. This record also stayed on the charts for over two years, a duration which is second of all time in Finland. After its release, the band effectively stopped touring or performing live.

In 2004, the band announced they would record a new album, Sadan vuoden päästäkin, which became one of the band's most successful releases. In 2007, they released their most recent album of new material, Syvään päähän.

In 2016, the band celebrated its 40th anniversary with a documentary film, book, photo exhibition and a massive show at Ratina stadium. The stadium concert had over 30 000 spectators.

On 23 October 2025, the band announced that it would retire from live performances after celebrating its 50th anniversary, with a farewell concert planned for 8 August 2026 in Tampere.

== Discography ==
=== Studio albums ===
List of albums, with selected chart positions
Title	Album details	Peak chart positions	Sales	Certifications
Title	Album details	FIN	Sales	Certifications
Aknepop (Acnepop)	Released: May 8, 1978; Label: Poko Rekords (POKOCD #64, POKS/PÄLP #2); Format: CD, CS, LP; Genre: Punk	16	31,579	Gold (1994)
Maximum Jee&Jee (Maximum Yeah&Yeah)	Released: April 17, 1979; Label: Poko Rekords (POKOCD #13, POKS/PÄLP #5); Format: CD, CS, LP; Genre: Punk	3 (April 1973)	62,971	Gold (1986); Platinum (1999)
Akun tehdas (Aku's factory)	Released: February 19, 1980; Label: Poko Rekords (POKOCD #12, POKS/PÄLP #12); Format: CD, CS, LP; Genre: New Wave	1 (April 1980)	56,909	Gold; Platinum
Cocktail bar	Released: June 15, 1981; Label: Poko Rekords (POKOCD #42, POKS/PÄLP #25); Format: CD, CS, LP; Genre: New Wave	2 (July 1981)	42,030	Gold (1985)
Tie vie (The road leads)	Released: June 1982; Label: Poko Rekords (POKOCD #15, POKS/PÄLP #35); Format: CD, CS, LP; Genre: Pop Rock	1 (June 1982)	50,581	Gold (1982); Platinum (2005)
Aku ja köyhät pojat (Aku and the poor boys)	Released: June 13, 1983; Label: Poko Rekords (POKOCD #14, POKS/PÄLP #45); Format: CD, CS, LP; Genre: Suomirock	5 (June 1986?)	34,563	Gold
Rupisia riimejä, karmeita tarinoita	Released: May 28, 1984; Label: Poko Rekords (POKOCD #5, POKS/PÄLP #52); Format: CD, CS, LP; Genre: Suomirock	1 (July 1984)	70,875	Gold; Platinum
Kahdeksas ihme (The eighth wonder)	Released: August 19, 1985; Label: Poko Rekords (POKOCD #1, POKS/PÄLP #61); Format: CD, CS, LP; Genre: Suomirock	1 (September 1985)	121,177	Gold; Platinum
Valkoinen kupla (The white bubble)	Released: December 4, 1986; Label: Poko Rekords (POKOCD #9, POKS/PÄLP #76); Format: CD, CS, LP; Genre: Suomirock	1 (8 weeks, December 1986)	118,820	Gold; Platinum
Imperiumin vastaisku (Empire strikes back)	Released: June 23, 1988; Label: Poko Rekords (POKOCD #21, POKS/PÄLP #91; Format: CD, CS, LP; Genre: Suomirock, AOR	1 (6 Weeks, June 1988)	98,528	Gold; Platinum
Historian suurmiehiä (Great men of history)	Released: June 14, 1990; Label: Poko Rekords (POKOCD #51, POKS/PÄLP #110); Format: CD, CS, LP; Genre: Suomirock, AOR	1 (2 Weeks, June 1990)	85,845	Gold; Platinum
Studio Etana (Studio Snail)	Released: May 12, 1993; Label: Poko Rekords (POKOCD/POKS/PÄLP #137); Format: CD, CS, LP; Genre: Suomirock	1 (2 Weeks, May 1993)	41,772	Gold
Sadan vuoden päästäkin (Hundred years from now)	Released: October 29, 2004; Label: Poko Rekords (POKOCD #303); Format: CD; Genre: Suomirock	1 (3 Weeks, week 45 2004)	85,620	Gold; Platinum
Syvään päähän (Into the deep end)	Released: September 5, 2007; Label: Akun Tehdastuotanto, Poko Rekords (EPPULP 2007, EPPUDG 2007, EPPUCD 2007); Format: LP, CD, Digipack; Genre: Suomirock	1 (2 Weeks, week 37 2007)	at least 40,000	Gold (5 September 2007); Platinum
Mutala	Released: November 23, 2011; Label: Poko Rekords; Format: CD, LP, blu-ray; Genre: Suomirock	1	At least 10,000	Gold

=== Live albums ===
- Elävänä Euroopassa (Alive in Europe) (1980)
- Onko vielä pitkä matka jonnekin? (Is there still a long way to somewhere?) (1994)
- Ratina (2016)

=== Compilation albums ===
- Pop pop pop (1982)
- Hatullinen paskaa (A hatful of shit) (1984)
- Aku, Juha, Martti ja Mikko² - soolot (Aku, Juha, Martti and Mikko² - solos) (1987)
- Poko-klassikko (Poko-classic) (1987)
- Lyömättömät (Unbeatables) (1989)
- Hatullinen paskaa/Soolot (A hatful of shit/Solos) (1990)
- Paskahatun paluu (Shithat's return) (1991)
- Repullinen hittejä (A bagful of hits) (1996)
- Reppu 2 - toinen repullinen kuolemattomia Eppu-klassikoita (Bag 2 - another bagful of immortal Eppu-classics) (2003)
- Singlet 1978–2003 (Singles 1978–2003) (2003)
- Jackpot - 101 Eppu-klassikkoa 1978–2009 (Jackpot - 101 Eppu-classics 1978–2009) (6 CD, 2009)
- Mutala (2011) - Acoustic versions of some of their most famous songs

== Filmography ==
- The Saimaa Gesture (1981)

== See also ==
- List of best-selling music artists in Finland
