= Al-Kafaàt University =

Private university in Beirut, Lebanon

Al-Kafaàt University (AKU)
- جامعـــة الكفـــاءات
- Type: Private
- Established: 1999; 27 years ago
- President: Fathi Oueida
- Location: Beirut, Lebanon

The Al-Kafaàt University (AKU) (Arabic: جامعة الكفاءات) is a private and independent university in Beirut, Lebanon. It was founded in 1999 by the Al-Kafaàt Foundation, and is managed by a board of trustees appointed by the foundation board of trustees.

== History ==
In 1957, Nadeem Shwayri founded the Al-Kafaàt Foundation, a non-profit and non-governmental development organization. With his wife Lily, they aimed to serve the challenged in Lebanon. Today, the Al-Kafatàt Foundation delivers education and rehabilitation to around 4,500 people, with a workforce of around 800 employees. The Al-Kafaàt Foundation is governed by a board of trustees.

The Al-Kafaàt Foundation is a founding member of the World Commission on Vocational Rehabilitation (1963), member of the International Cerebral Palsy Society (1979), member of Inclusion International (1981), recipient of the Rehabilitation International Presidential Award (1984), three-time recipient of the Lebanese Order of the Cedars (Knight 1972, Officer 1997, and Commander 2007), and recipient of the Antiochian Orthodox Archdiocese of North America Antonian Gold Medal (2010).

In the mid-1990s, the Al-Kafaàt Foundation launched the Al-Kafaàt Institution of Higher Education, which obtained the Ministry of Higher Education's approval in 1999. The Al Kafaàt Foundation then developed the School of Technology and the School of Education, covering ten fields of study.

In 2005, the Al-Kafaàt University was accredited by the Ministry of Education after developing the School of Business and the School of Fine Arts.

The university campus is located in Ain Saadeh, ten kilometers away from the Lebanese capital city, Beirut.

== Faculties ==
- Computer Science
- Electronics
- Mechanics
- Banking and Finance
- Hotel Management
- Food Industries
- Audio Visual (Cinema)
- Interior Design
- Advertising and Graphic Design
- Preschool and Elementary Education
- Special Education
- Gerontology and proximity care
