= Anssi Kela =

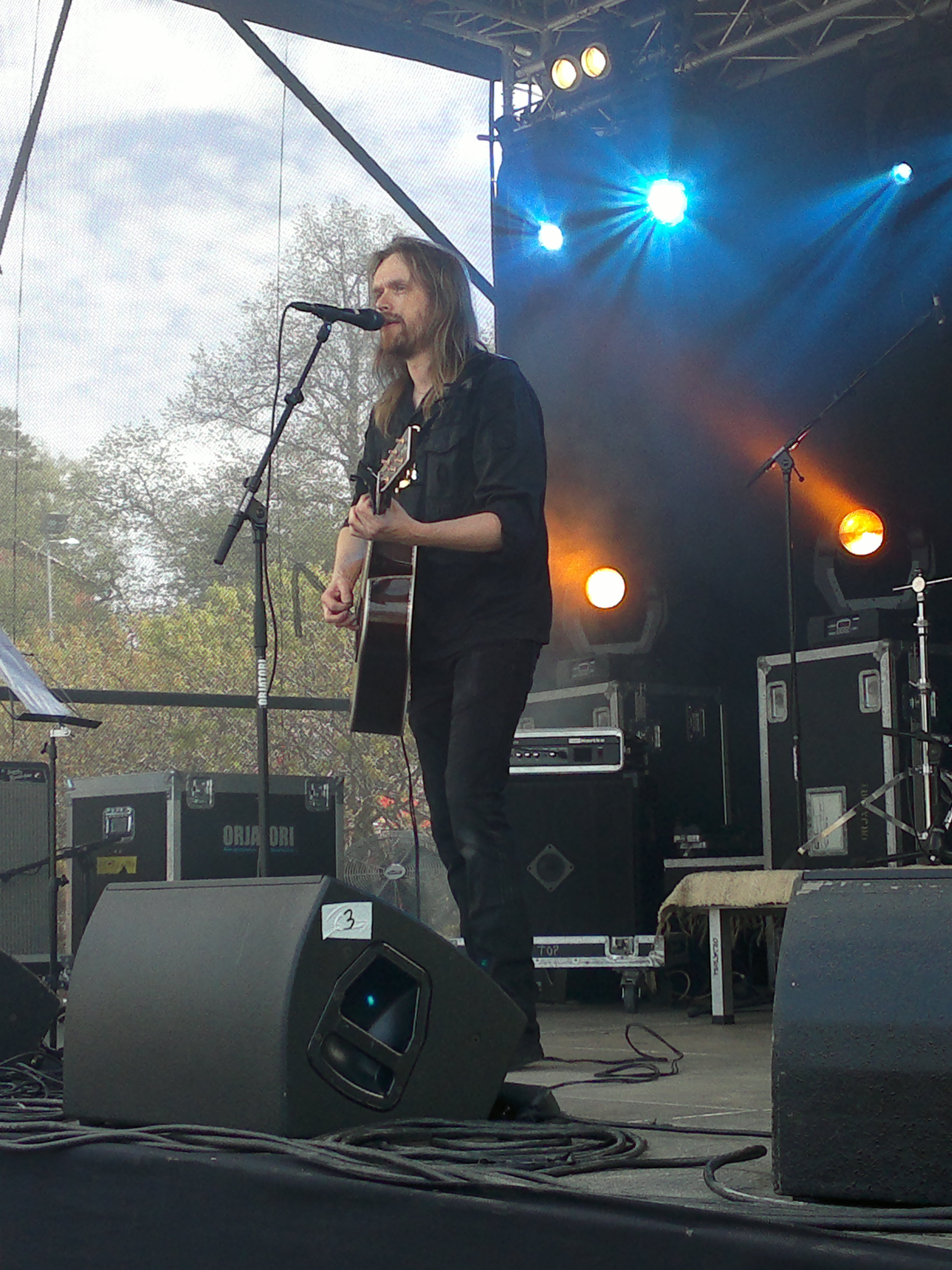
- Anssi Kela (2012)

Background information
- Born: Anssi Matias Kela; 29 July 1972 (age 54); Kerava, Finland
- Origin: Helsinki, Finland
- Genre: rock
- Occupations: singer, songwriter, multi-instrumentalist
- Years active: 1985–present
- Label: The Fried Music
- Website: anssikela.com

Anssi Kela (born 29 July 1972 in Kerava, Finland) is a Finnish singer-songwriter multi-instrumentalist who has published six albums. During his career, Kela has sold over 230,000 records in Finland. He received four Emma awards in 2002.

Anssi Kela comes from a musical family. His late father was a keyboardist and songwriter in a gospel band called Pro Fide, his mother is a cantor and brother a drummer. Kela began his musical career playing various stringed instruments, including the violin, cello and contrabass.

However he was more interested in rock music, and wanted to play bass, instead. At the age of 13, in 1985, Kela formed a gospel band Yhdeksäs hetki with his school mates. In the band he played bass and wrote the songs. After the band gave up gospel music and changed their name to Pekka ja susi. Kela started to sing in the band as well as playing bass. In 1993, the band won the contest "Finnish Rock champion" and got a record deal with BMG. Their only album in 1994 was a flop. It included one minor hit "Karhun elämää". In 1999 the band broke up to musical differences and Kela started to write material to his first solo album.

The debut, Nummela, is one of the best-selling Finnish records – it has sold over 150,000 copies (quintuple platinum). The album is named after Kela's former hometown Nummela, in Vihti. His biggest hits from that album were "Mikan faijan BMW", "Kaksi sisarta", "Puistossa" and "Nummela". The next single "Milla" was in the triple platinum version of the album. It is the best selling single to date in Finland. The second album Suuria kuvioita in 2003 included one of his biggest hits, "1972". The album sold platinum. The 3rd album Rakkaus on murhaa got a gold record in 2005. The 2009 album, Aukio, was a concept album telling a story of a miner. It debuted at number four on the Finnish album chart, but the sales were disappointing. Only the song "Aamu" was a hit. Kela ended the deal with Sony Music after the compilation album Singlet 2000 – 2010 and signed a deal with Live Nation. His self-titled album Anssi Kela was published in March 2013. On the album, he plays all the instruments himself, except one saxophone solo, and like in all of his albums he has written all the songs himself. He also produced, arranged and recorded the album. The first single "Levoton tyttö" was the most played song on the Finnish radio in 2013. The song resulted in his comeback.

Apart from music, Anssi Kela drove in the Finnish Formula 3 class in 2004–2007. He gained four victories and 13 podium positions. Also interested in literature, in 2008 Kela published his debut fiction novel, Kesä Kalevi Sorsan Kanssa (Summer with Kalevi Sorsa). He has also published a book called Matkamuistoja (Travel memories) in 2012. It tells a humorous story about his life on the road with the band.

== Discography ==
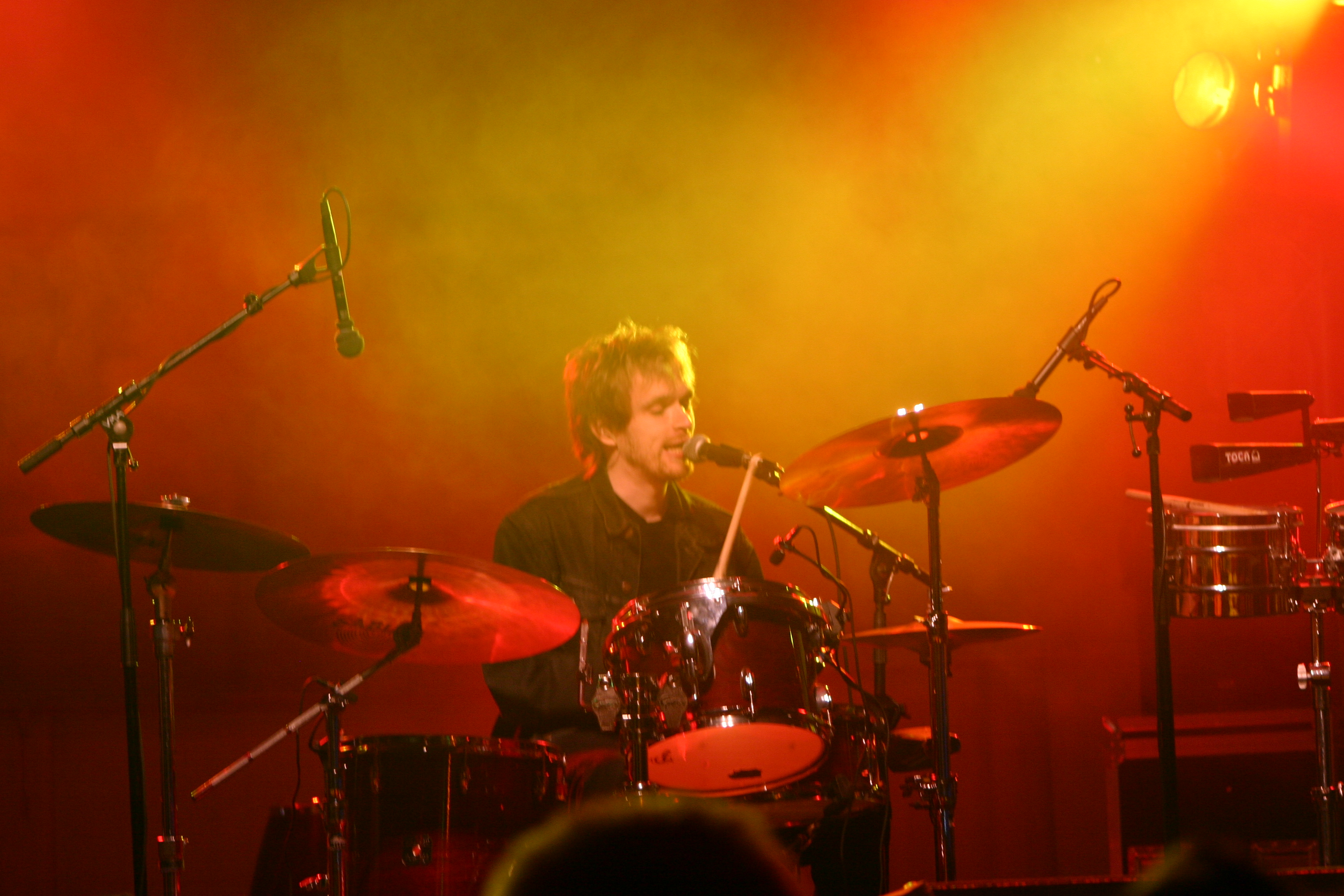
Anssi Kela playing drums

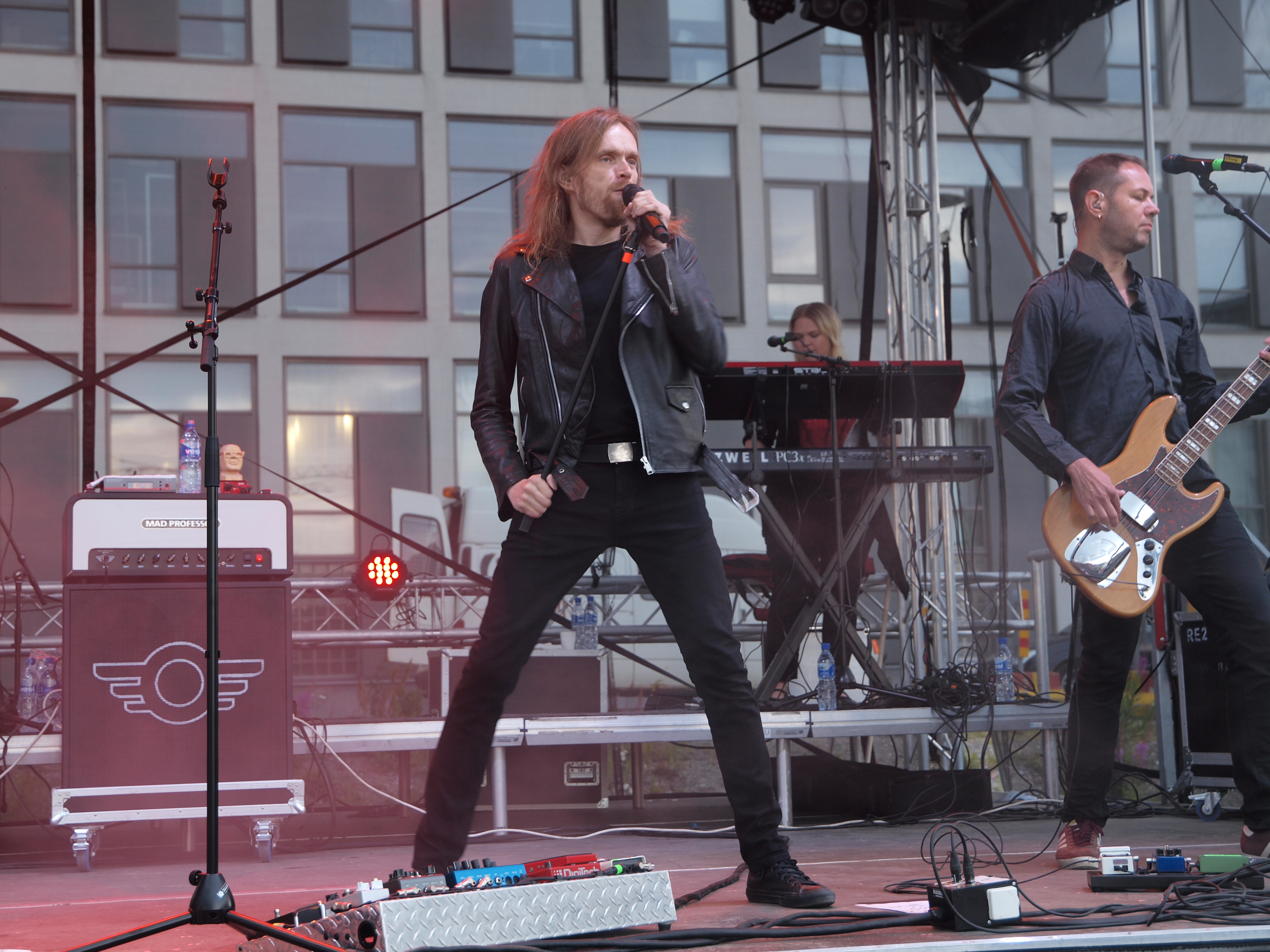
Anssi Kela singing in Jätkäsaari, Helsinki, Finland.

=== Albums ===
- 2001: Nummela
- 2003: Suuria kuvioita
- 2005: Rakkaus on murhaa
- 2009: Aukio
- 2010: Singlet 2000 – 2010
- 2013: Anssi Kela
- 2015: Nostalgiaa
- 2016: Parasta aikaa
- 2018: Ääriviivoja

=== Singles ===
- 2000: "Mikan faijan BMW"
- 2001: "Kaksi sisarta" / "Kaksi sisarta" (demo) / "Mikan faijan BMW" (demo)
- 2001: "Nummela" (radio edit) (promotional single)
- 2001: "Puistossa" / "Puistossa" (Flegmaatikot-remix)" / "Puistossa" (demo)
- 2001: "Milla" / "Milla" (video) / "Mikan faijan BMW" (video)
- 2003: "Suuria kuvioita"
- 2003: "1972" (promotional single)
- 2003: "Laulu petetyille" (radio edit) / "Laulu petetyille" (promotional single)
- 2005: "Karhusaari" (promotional single)
- 2005: "Jennifer Aniston" / "Insomnia" / "Kaksi sisarta" (live) / "Mikan faijan BMW" (live) / "Jennifer Aniston" (video)
- 2005: "Älä mene pois" (promotional single)
- 2005: "Rakkaus on murhaa" (single version) / "Rakkaus on murhaa" (album version) / "Puistossa" (live) / "Rakkaus on murhaa" (live) / "Rva Ruusunen" (live)
- 2007: "Suomalainen"
- 2009: "Aamu"
- 2009: "Kaivos"
- 2010: "Nolla"
- 2013: "Levoton Tyttö"
- 2013: "Miten sydämet toimii?"
- 2013: "Maitohapoilla"
- 2013: "Palava silta"
- 2015: "Nostalgiaa"
- 2015: "Tanssilattialla"
- 2015: "Viimeinen yö"
- 2015: "Piirrä minuun tie"
- 2015: "Kasarin lapsi"
- 2015: "Petri Ruusunen"
- 2016: "Voitais välillä elää" (Elastinen feat. Anssi Kela)
- 2016: "Musta tuntuu multa"
- 2016: "Mä haluun viihdyttää"
- 2016: "R-A-K-A-S"
- 2016: "Rappiolla"
- 2016: "Minä olen muistanut"
- 2016: "Sininen ja valkoinen"
- 2016: "Fiilaten ja höyläten"
- 2016: "Hetki lyö"
- 2017: "Rakkaus upottaa"
- 2018: "Ilves"
- 2018: "Jotain on poissa"
- 2019: "Ilves" (feat. EMO Ensemble)
- 2019: "Miljoona volttii"
- 2020: "Hyppy sumuun"

== See also ==
- List of best-selling music artists in Finland
