= Aku Alho =

Finnish ice hockey defenceman

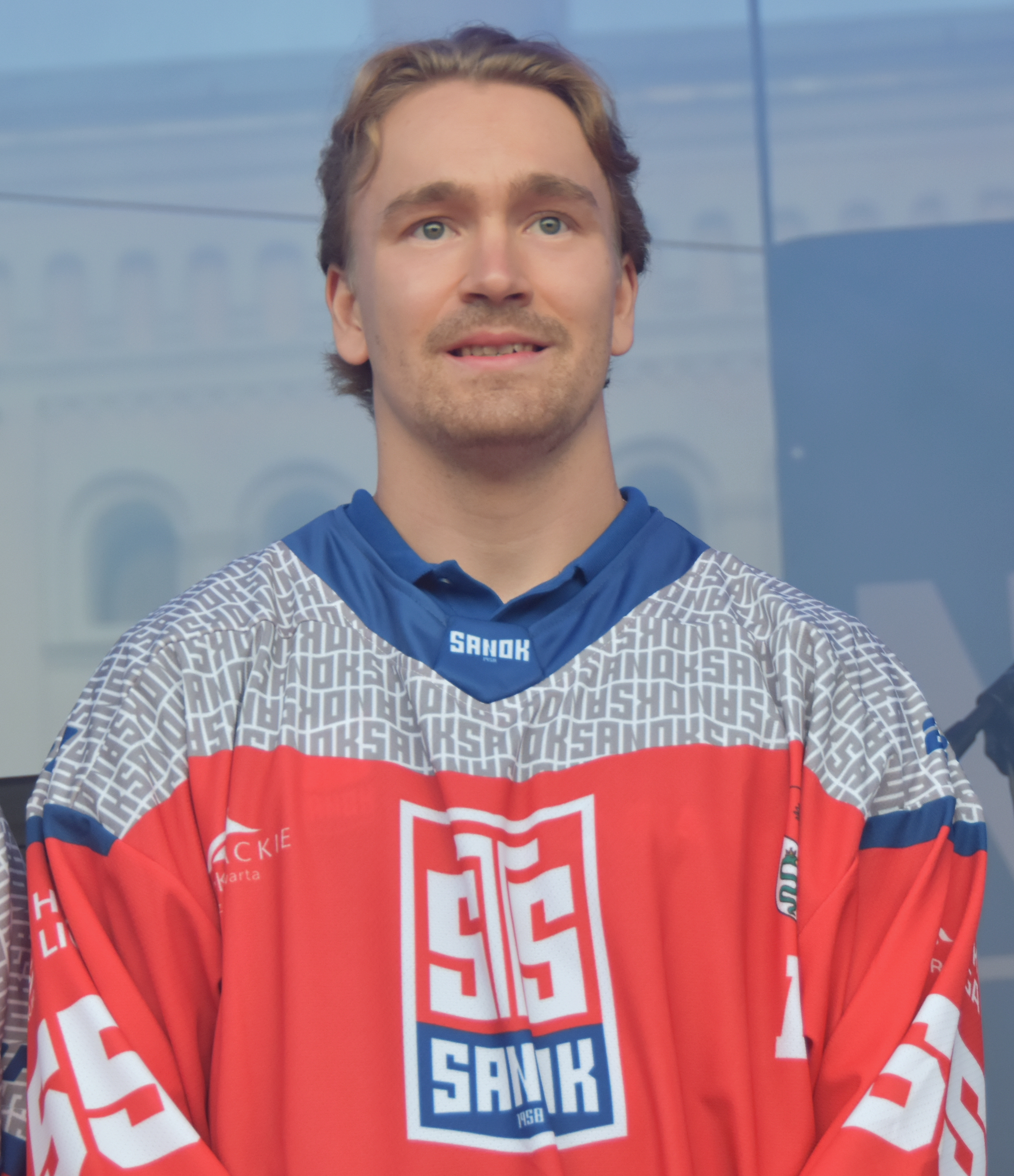
- Born: 27 June 1997 (age 29) Espoo, Finland
- Height: 6 ft 0 in (183 cm)
- Weight: 192 lb (87 kg; 13 st 10 lb)
- Position: Defence
- Shoots: Left
- Liiga team (P) Cur. team: Jukurit; Ketterä (Mestis)
- Playing career: 2018–present

Aku Alho (born 27 June 1997) is a Finnish professional ice hockey defenceman who is currently playing for Ketterä on loan from Jukurit.

== Career ==
Alho began his career in his hometown of Espoo, playing for Blues's junior teams until 2016 when he joined Jukurit. He made his Liiga for Jukurit on 25 January 2018 against Sport and played ten games in total during the 2017–18 season.

On 18 September 2018, Alho joined Mestis side Ketterä on loan for the 2018–19 season. Alho returned to Jukurit's roster to play a regular season game on 21 September 2019, also against Sport, before being loaned back to Ketterä on 7 October 2019 for an indefinite period.
