= Juice Leskinen =

Finnish singer-songwriter

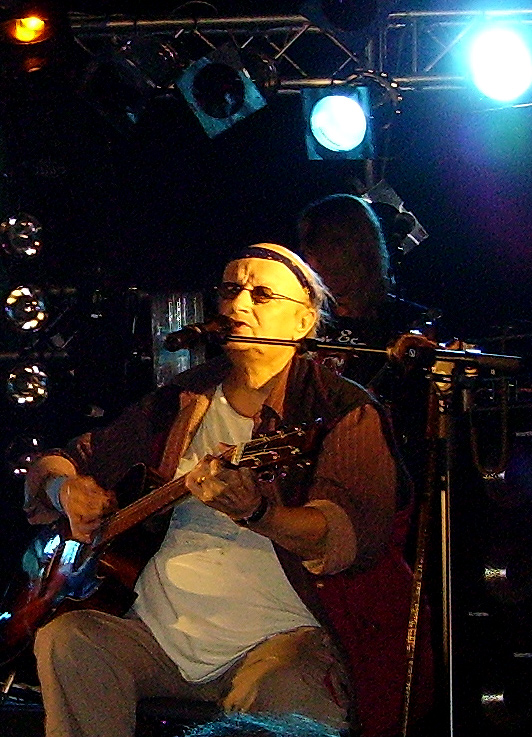
- Juice Leskinen at his second to last concert in Tampere, Finland in August 2006

Background information
- Born: 19 February 1950; Juankoski, Finland
- Origin: Finland
- Died: 24 November 2006 (aged 56) Tampere, Finland
- Genres: Manserock; proto-punk
- Years active: 1973–2006

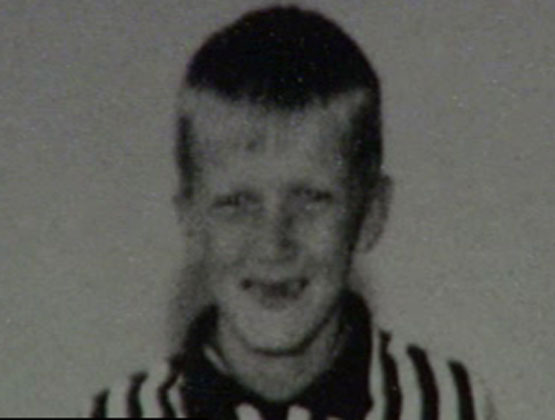
Juhani Leskinen as a child

Juice Leskinen and Tarja Numminen got married in 1977

Juhani Juice Leskinen (born Pauli Matti Juhani Leskinen; 19 February 1950 – 24 November 2006), better known as Juice Leskinen (pronounced [ˈjui̯se ˈleskinen] as if the word juice were Finnish) was one of the most important and successful Finnish singer-songwriters of the late 20th century. From the early 1970s onward he released nearly 30 full-length albums and wrote song lyrics for dozens of other Finnish artists. Several of Leskinen's songs have reached classic status in Finnish popular music, e.g., "Viidestoista yö", "Kaksoiselämää" and "Syksyn sävel". His early records are considered staples of the so-called Manserock movement of the mid-'70s. He also wrote poetry and plays and published nine collections of verse and seven plays.

After moving to Tampere to study English translation in 1970, Leskinen began his recording career in 1973 with the eponymous debut album of Juice Leskinen & Coitus Int. One more record, Per Vers, runoilija, was made under the same band name, but from then on he released records with several line-ups, most notably Juice Leskinen Slam and Juice Leskinen Grand Slam from the late 1970s until the mid-1980s. Although concentrating more on poetry from the early 1990s, Leskinen still released new music every few years despite his failing health, which was caused by the unhealthy lifestyle he had led for years. After the longest hiatus of his recording career, L marked Leskinen's 50th birthday in 2000. His last record, Senaattori ja boheemi (released in 2004), is a collaboration with Mikko Alatalo, a return to their partnership of the early 1970s. He wrote "Nuku pommiin" in 1982 for the Eurovision Song Contest.

Juice Leskinen's most famous songs include "Viidestoista yö" ("Fifteenth Night"), "Musta aurinko nousee" ("A Sun Rises out of Me", often misunderstood as "The Black Sun Rises" despite a clear pause between "musta" and "aurinko"), "Marilyn", "Rakkauden ammattilainen" ("Love Pro"), "Norjalainen villapaita" ("Norwegian Sweater") and "Kaksoiselämää" (Double Life).

Leskinen was diagnosed with Asperger syndrome in the early 2000s.

He qualified 38th in the poll of the 100 greatest Finns held during the summer of 2004.

Leskinen died in 2006, after living with chronic kidney disease, cirrhosis and diabetes. He is buried in Kalevankangas cemetery, Tampere, near the main gate.

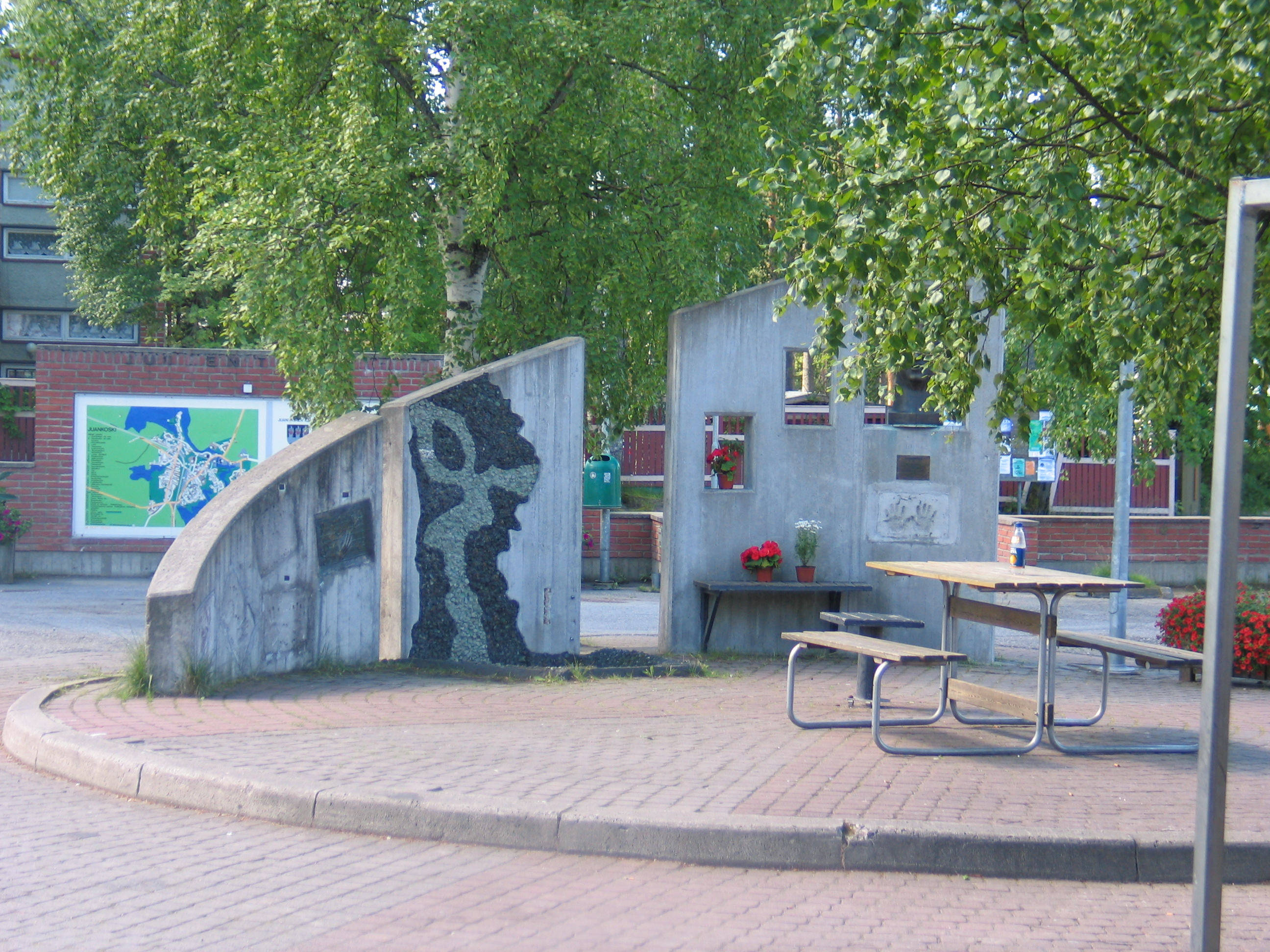
Juice Leskinen's monument in Juankoski, Kuopio, Finland

Leskinen has gained a considerable amount of posthumous recognition. A musical about Leskinen, titled Juice – taiteilijaelämää (an artist's life) premiered in Tampere on 30 August 2011. In 2015, two film companies announced plans for biography films. One of them was cancelled. In 2014 a biography of Leskinen was published, written by Antti Heikkinen, and named Risainen elämä. Juice Leskinen 1950–2006.

== Discography ==
- 1973 Juice Leskinen & Coitus Int.: Juice Leskinen & Coitus Int
- 1974 Juice Leskinen & Coitus Int.: Per Vers, runoilija
- 1975 Juice Leskinen & Mikko Alatalo: Juice ja Mikko
- 1976 Juice: Keskitysleirin ruokavalio
- 1977 Juice: Lahtikaupungin rullaluistelijat
- 1978 Juice Leskinen Slam: Tauko I
- 1978 Välikausitakki: Välikausitakki
- 1979 Juice Leskinen Slam: Tauko II
- 1980 Juice Leskinen Slam: XV yö (Tauko III)
- 1980 Juice Leskinen Slam: Kuusessa ollaan
- 1981 Juice Leskinen Slam: Ajan Henki
- 1981 Juice Leskinen: Dokumentti
- 1982 Juice Leskinen Grand Slam: Sivilisaatio
- 1983 Juice Leskinen Grand Slam: Deep Sea Diver
- 1983 Juice Leskinen Grand Slam: Boogieteorian alkeet peruskoulun ala-astetta varten – lyhyt oppimäärä
- 1984 Juice Leskinen Grand Slam: Kuopio-Iisalmi-Nivala (Live)
- 1985 Juice Leskinen Grand Slam: Pyromaani palaa rikospaikalle
- 1986 Juice Leskinen Grand Slam: Yölento
- 1987 Juice Leskinen: Minä
- 1990 Juice Leskinen: Sinä
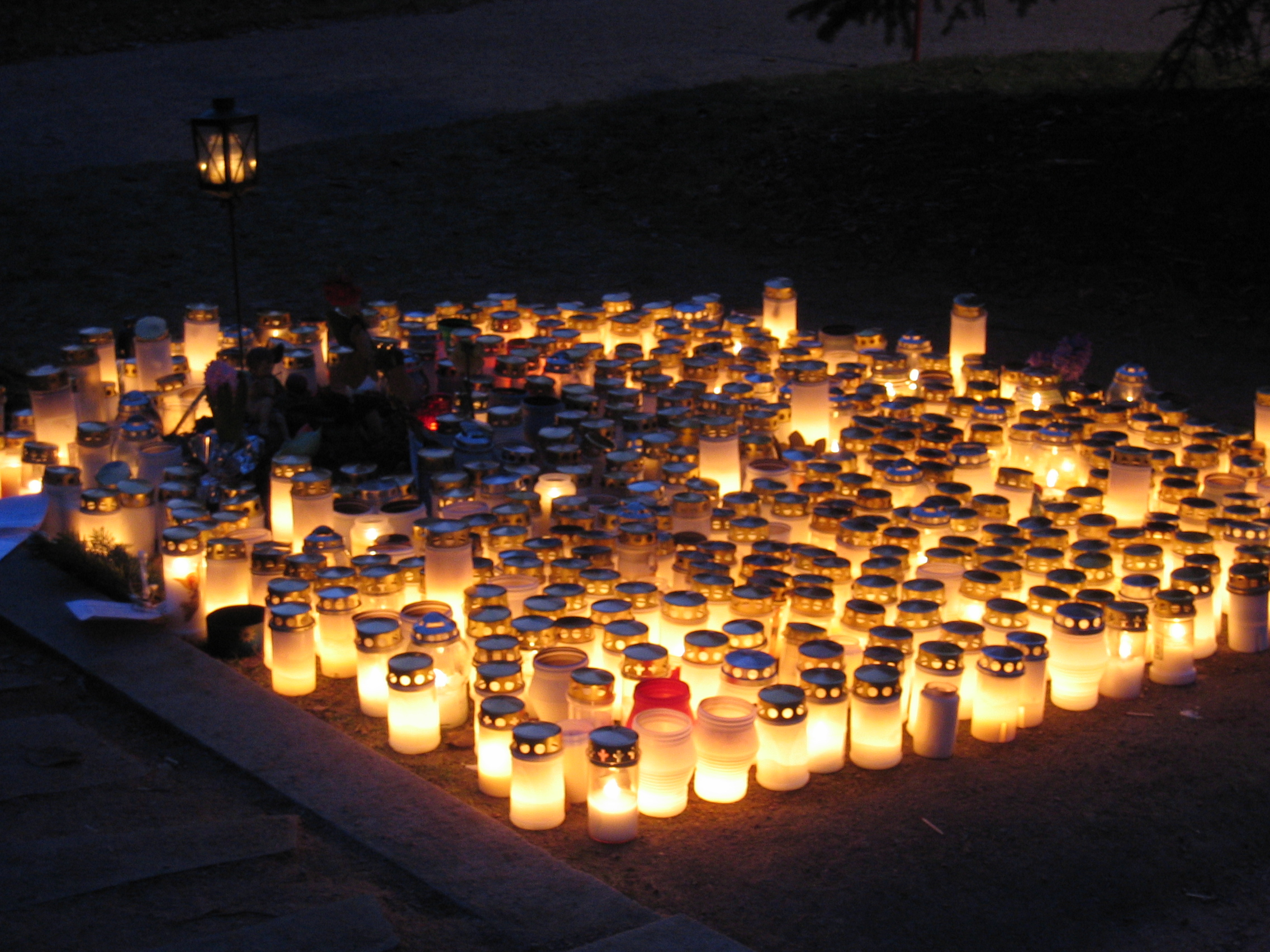
  Juice Leskinen's grave in December 2006.
- 1991 Juice Leskinen Grand Slam: Taivaan kappaleita
- 1992 Juice Leskinen Etc.: Simsalabim Jim
- 1993 Juice Leskinen: Haitaribussi
- 1996 Juice Leskinen: Kiveä ja sämpylää
- 2000 Juice Leskinen: L
- 2002 Juice Leskinen: Vaiti, aivan hiljaa
- 2004 Juice Leskinen & Mikko Alatalo: Senaattori ja boheemi
- 2005 (live) Juice Leskinen & Mikko Alatalo: Klassikoiden ilta
- 2008 (live) JuiceRemuDave – Live!
- 2015 (live) Juice Leskinen & Ari Kankaanpää

== Official collection albums ==
- 1976 Singlet 1974–76
- 1977 Tähän saakka
- 1992 Sietämätön mies
- 1997 Kautta aikain
- 2000 Maamme (Vårt land)
- 2003 Tuomaksen Evankeliumi
- 2006 Kautta aikain 2
- 2007 Syksyn sävel – Kaikki singlet 1974–2004

== Other collection albums ==
- 1981 Oikea valinta: Juice – 14 parasta puolta
- 1982 Parhaat
- 1982 Kokoelma
- 1983 Tupla: Ajan henki / Dokumentti
- 1984 Matka Suomeen
- 1986 Masters
- 1986 Parhaat
- 1987 Parhaat
- 1987 Juice Leskinen Slam
- 1988 Lauluja rakastamisen vaikeudesta
- 1989 Extra
- 1991 2 alkuperäistä (Tauko II / Tauko III)
- 1991 Juicinfonia, esitt. The New Generation Orchestra, joht. Tuomas Lampela
- 1992 12 alkuperäistä
- 1993 12 alkuperäistä
- 1993 Valitut teokset
- 1994 Suomen parhaat
- 1994 Lauluja rakastamisen vaikeudesta
- 1995 20 suosikkia – Ei elämästä selviä hengissä
- 1997 20 suosikkia – Onnellinen mies
- 2008 Juice Leskinen – Parhaat
- 2012 20 × Juice Leskinen
- 2012 20 × Juice Leskinen & Grand Slam
- 2013 Sävel ja sanat
- 2014 37 laulua Suomesta
- 2014 Johanna-vuodet, osa 1
- 2014 Johanna-vuodet 1982–1983
- 2015 Kaikkien aikojen Juice (2015)
- 2016 Love-vuodet 1973–1978

== Filmography ==
- The Saimaa Gesture (1981)
- The Last Border (1993)

== Literary works ==
=== Collections of poetry ===
- 1975 Sonetteja laumalle
- 1981 Sanoja
- 1989 Iltaisin, kun veneet tulevat kotiin
- 1990 Pieniä sanoja sinulle, jota rakastan
- 1994 Äeti (luonnos muistelmiksi, runoja)
- 1996 Jumala on
- 1998 Maanosamme, maailmamme
- 1999 Aika jätti (Runoja)
- 2002 Ilonkorjuun aika 2002

=== Children's books ===
- 1987 Satuinen musiikkituokio (with Matti Pellonpää, book and cassette)
- 1992 Räkä ja Roiskis
- 1995 Räkä ja Roiskis Suuvedellä
- 1997 Räkä ja Roiskis naisissa

=== Other works ===
- 1978 Kuka murhasi rock'n' roll tähden (diary)
- 1984 Päivää (short stories)
- 1993 Vaikuttajat korvissamme (essays)
- 2003 Siinäpä tärkeimmät: edellinen osa E. Ch. (memoirs)

== Plays ==
- 1980 Valto
- 1983 Isänmaan toivo
- 1984 Ravintola Wunderbar
- 1985 Kolme hanhea matkalla pohjoiseen (with Liisa Laukkarinen)
- 1988 Harald Hirmuinen
- 1990 Mikä ny
- 1996 Soma rillumarei

== See also ==
- List of best-selling music artists in Finland
