= Mikko Alatalo =

Finnish musician and politician (born 1951)

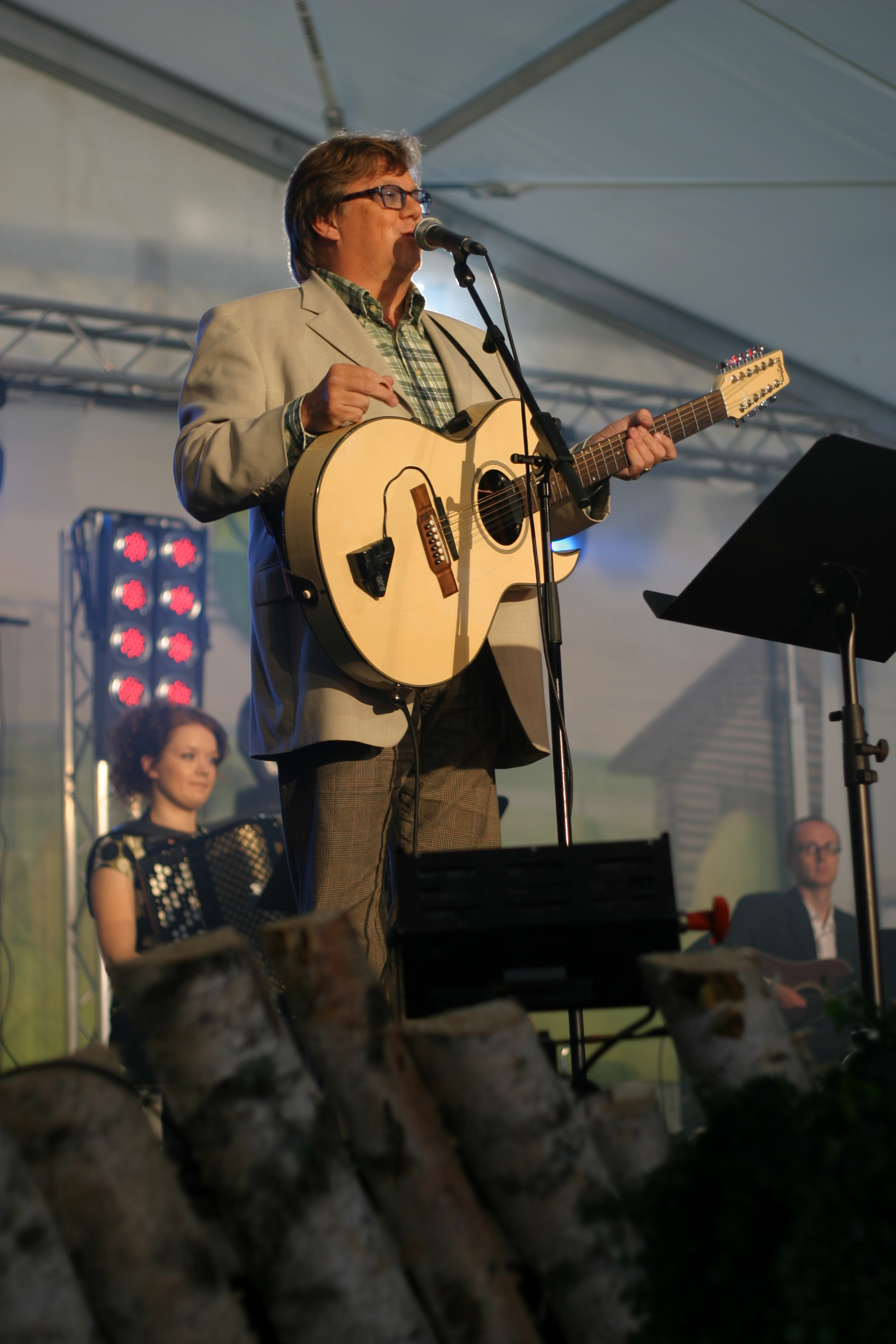
Mikko Alatalo (2007)

Mikko Tapio Alatalo (born 1 May 1951) is a Finnish musician and politician.

== Career ==
Alatalo was born in Kuivaniemi, now a part of Ii, Finland. He is mostly known for his long and successful musical career. His style is primarily seen as children's music and folk music but he has contributed to other genres as well, including a long partnership with rock musician Juice Leskinen. A significant part of his songs were co-written with Harri Rinne. His most famous songs include "Maalaispoika oon" ("I'm a country boy"), "Hasardi" (A play on the word Hazard), "Rokkilaulaja" ("Rock singer").

In the 1980s his style changed from rock more towards schlager. He also made some children's songs (including "Känkkäränkkä", "Taitaa tulla kesä") that became famous. Alatalo was also seen on numerous TV programs, often hosting music top lists, schlager music shows and programs on recreational alpine skiing.

Alatalo was elected to the Parliament of Finland in 2003 and re-elected in 2007, 2011 and 2015. He was also elected to the City Council of Tampere in 2008 and 2012. Alatalo is a member of the Centre Party and a strong proponent of artists' intellectual property rights to their own music.

== Discography ==
=== Studio albums ===
- Maalaispoika oon (1974)
- Hasardi (1976)
- Rokkilaulaja (1977)
- Viimeinen lehmipoika (1978)
- Yhdentoista virran maa – Lauluja Siirtomaa-Suomesta 1 (1978)
- Onnenpoika (1979)
- Iso joki tulvii – Lauluja Siirtomaa-Suomesta 2 (1981)
- Eläimiä suomalaismetsissä (1981)
- III tasavallan vieraana – Lauluja Siirtomaa-Suomesta 3 (1982)
- Sielun miljonääri (1983)
- Ikävän karkoitus (1984)
- Känkkäränkkä ja Artturi Robotti (1984)
- En lantis är jag (1984)
- Syntynyt lähiössä (1986)
- Kaikilla mausteilla (1987)
- Lapsi on terve, kun se heiluu (1988)
- Känkkäränkkä-hiihtokoulu (1989)
- Kuule kuinka kulkee (1990)
- Joulun laulut (1990)
- Yö alkaa yhdeltätoista (1991)
- Känkkäränkän uudet kujeet (1992)
- Puutarha (1993)
- Herraksi synnytään (1994)
- Yökynttilä (1997)
- Taksimiehen poika (1999)
- Suosituimmat yhteislaulut (2000)
- Kantri (2001)
- Kaikki sitä tekevät mielellään! – Kantri 2 (2008)
- Maailma tarvii duunaria – Kantri 3 (2013)
- Viimeinen juna (2018)
