= Poko Rekords =

Finnish record label

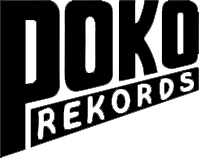
- Founded: 1977
- Founder: Epe Helenius
- Defunct: 2009
- Genre: Punk rock, Rockabilly, Heavy metal, Suomirock
- Country of origin: Finland
- Location: Tampere

Poko Rekords was a Finnish record label. It was established in 1977, but ceased operations in 2009. In the early years, Poko Rekords focused mainly on punk and rockabilly music and later expanded its artist range to heavier rock music. Poko Rekords released records by many successful Finnish artists and bands. Among others, Eppu Normaali, Popeda, Hassisen Kone, Sielun Veljet, J. Karjalainen, The Pansies, Yö, Ismo Alanko, Petri Nygård, The 69 Eyes and Diablo were at Poko Rekords.

To expand the selection, Epe Helenius, who founded the record company, founded Poko International in the early 1980s, when Poko was able to start distributing records by international artists in Finland; for example, Metallica's first three records in the 1980s were distributed by Poko International. The company's sub-brands included Northern Swing, Gaga Goodies and Seal on Velvet. In 2001, Epe Helenius sold Poko Rekords to the multinational record company EMI. However, Poko Rekords continued to operate as an independent unit and the company still had an office in Tampere. In the spring of 2009, Poko Rekords was merged with EMI Finland. At the same time, Epe Helenius founded the new Sound Of Finland company, to which some of Poko's younger artists and a large part of Poko Rekords' staff were transferred. After that, no new artists were added to Poko Rekords. Since 2013, the company's catalog has been owned by Universal Music Finland.

By the company's 30th anniversary in 2007, Poko had released a total of 520 albums and 770 singles by about 300 artists. Of Poko's albums, 90 have earned a gold record and 43 a platinum record, some of them triple platinum. The most successful release has been Eppu Normaali's collection Repullinen hittejä ("A Bagful of Hits"), which has sold over 250,000 copies.

== See also ==
- List of record labels

== Sources ==
- Vesa Kontiainen: Aitoa suomirokkia - Poko Rekordsin historia
