= B1A4 discography =

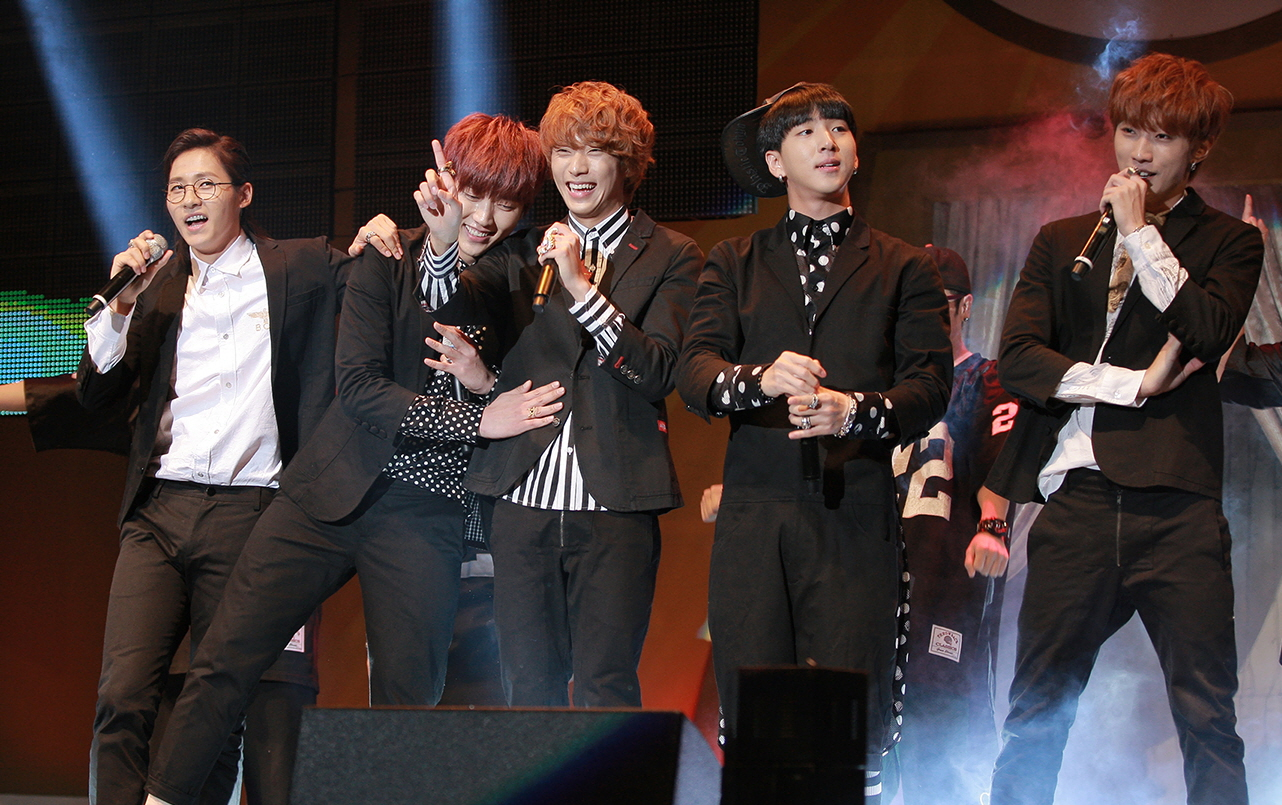
- B1A4 in November 2013
- Studio albums: 9
- Extended plays: 9
- Soundtrack albums: 8
- Compilation albums: 14
- Singles: 28
- Music videos: 20
- Promotional singles: 10
- Reissues: 1

This is the discography of South Korean idol group B1A4. B1A4 debuted on April 23, 2011 on the weekly music show Show! Music Core aired on MBC the group currently has released nine studio albums, one reissue, fourteen compilation albums, nineextended plays, and various singles. Into a year upon debuting, the boys of B1A4 made their foray into the Japanese market with a Japanese version of "Beautiful Target" released on June 27, 2012. The group released their first Japanese album entitled 1 on October 24 that same year.

== Albums ==
=== Studio albums ===
Title	Album details	Peak chart positions			Sales
Title	Album details	KOR	JPN	US World	Sales
Korean
Ignition	Released: March 14, 2012; Label: WM Entertainment; Formats: CD, digital download	2	—	—	KOR: 52,610; JPN: 12,903+
Who Am I	Released: January 13, 2014; Label: WM Entertainment; Formats: CD, digital download	1	8	7	KOR: 126,561; JPN: 8,304
Good Timing	Released: November 28, 2016; Label: WM Entertainment; Formats: CD, digital download	1	50	9	KOR: 77,390; JPN: 1,526
Origine	Released: October 19, 2020; Label: WM Entertainment; Formats: CD, digital download	6	28	—	KOR: 46,186; JPN: 2,013
Japanese
1	Released: October 24, 2012; Label: Pony Canyon; Formats: CD, digital download	—	5	—	JPN: 20,547
2	Released: March 19, 2014; Label: Pony Canyon; Formats: CD, digital download	—	9	—	JPN: 13,971
3	Released: March 16, 2016; Label: Pony Canyon; Formats: CD, digital download	—	4	—	JPN: 11,752
4	Released: June 14, 2017; Label: Universal Music; Formats: CD, digital download	—	5	—	JPN: 9,167
5	Released: June 27, 2018; Label: Universal Music; Formats: CD, digital download	—	19	—	JPN: 6,750
"—" denotes releases that did not chart or were not released in that region.

=== Reissues ===
Title	Album details	Peak chart positions		Sales
Title	Album details	KOR	JPN	Sales
Ignition Special Edition	Released: May 24, 2012; Label: WM Entertainment; Formats: CD, digital download	1	42	KOR: 62,012

=== Compilation albums ===
Title	Album details	Peak chart positions	Sales
Title	Album details	JPN	Sales
Let's Fly / It B1A4	Released: January 25, 2012; Label: Pony Canyon; Formats: CD, digital download	25	JPN: 5,000+
Super Hits -Asian Edition-	Released: November 2, 2012; Label: Warner Music Taiwan; Formats: CD, digital download	256	JPN: 366+
Super Hits 2 -Asian Edition-	Released: June 28, 2013; Label: Warner Music Taiwan; Formats: CD, digital download	—	
Miracle Radio -2.5kHz- vol.1	Released: March 11, 2015; Label: Pony Canyon; Formats: CD, digital download	41	JPN: 1,486
Miracle Radio -2.5kHz- vol.2	Released: March 11, 2015; Label: Pony Canyon; Formats: CD, digital download	55	
Miracle Radio -2.5kHz- vol.3	Released: March 11, 2015; Label: Pony Canyon; Formats: CD, digital download	78	
Miracle Radio -2.5kHz- vol.4	Released: March 11, 2015; Label: Pony Canyon; Formats: CD, digital download	51	
Miracle Radio -2.5kHz- vol.5	Released: March 11, 2015; Label: Pony Canyon; Formats: CD, digital download	53	
B1A4 Fan Hits Korea	Released: March 8, 2017; Label: Universal Music; Formats: CD, digital download	72	
B1A4 Station Kiss	Released: February 21, 2018; Label: Pony Canyon; Formats: CD, digital download	—	
B1A4 Station Circle	Released: February 21, 2018; Label: Pony Canyon; Formats: CD, digital download	270	
B1A4 Station Triangle	Released: February 21, 2018; Label: Pony Canyon; Formats: CD, digital download	—	
B1A4 Station Square	Released: February 21, 2018; Label: Pony Canyon; Formats: CD, digital download	—	
B1A4 Japan Best Album 2012–2018	Released: September 26, 2018; Label: Universal Music; Formats: CD, digital download	86	
"—" denotes releases that did not chart or were not released in that region.

== Extended plays ==
Title	Album details	Peak chart positions			Sales
Title	Album details	KOR	JPN	US World	Sales
Let's Fly	Released: April 21, 2011; Label: WM Entertainment; Formats: CD, digital download	6	—	—	KOR: 44,090
It B1A4	Released: September 16, 2011; Label: WM Entertainment; Formats: CD, digital download	2	—	—	KOR: 58,612
In the Wind	Released: November 12, 2012; Label: WM Entertainment; Formats: CD, digital download	1	34	—	KOR: 79,931; JPN: 8,457+
What's Happening?	Released: May 8, 2013; Label: WM Entertainment; Formats: CD, digital download	1	16	—	KOR: 104,279; JPN: 4,793+
Solo Day	Released: July 14, 2014; Label: WM Entertainment; Formats: CD, digital download	1	209	8	KOR: 86,711
Sweet Girl	Released: August 10, 2015; Label: WM Entertainment; Formats: CD, digital download	2	23	—	KOR: 65,626; JPN: 2,098
Rollin'	Released: September 25, 2017; Label: WM Entertainment; Formats: CD, digital download	1	13	7	KOR: 82,291; JPN: 4,407
Connect	Released: January 8, 2024; Label: WM Entertainment; Formats: CD, digital download	12	—	—	KOR: 35,653
Set	Released: April 21, 2026; Label: B1A4 Company, HIEUTPIEUP, Dreamus; Formats: CD, digital download	16	—	—	KOR: 19,943
"—" denotes releases that did not chart or were not released in that region.

== Singles ==
Title	Year	Peak chart positions				Sales (Note: Korean-language singles are digital downloads while Japanese-language singles are physical units, except noted.)	Album
Title	Year	KOR	KOR Hot	JPN	JPN Hot	Sales	Album
Korean
"O.K"	2011	90	—	—	—	KOR: 90,632 (DL)	Let's Fly
"Only Learned Bad Things" (못된 것만 배워서)	2011	149	—	—	—	KOR: 43,813 (DL)	Let's Fly
"Beautiful Target"	2011	67	67	—	—	KOR: 309,925 (DL)	It B1A4
"My Love"	2011	—	—	—	—		It B1A4
"This Time Is Over"	2012	44	55	—	—	KOR: 142,232 (DL)	Ignition
"Baby I'm Sorry"	2012	19	18	—	—	KOR: 654,903 (DL)	Ignition
"Baby Good Night" (잘자요 굿나잇)	2012	13	14	—	—	KOR: 1,070,830 (DL)	Ignition: Special Edition
"Tried to Walk" (걸어 본다)	2012	8	14	—	—	KOR: 537,290 (DL)	In the Wind
"What's Happening?" (이게 무슨 일이야)	2013	9	13	—	—	KOR: 680,521 (DL)	What's Happening?
"Lonely" (없구나)	2014	2	7	—	—	KOR: 695,394 (DL)	Who Am I
"Solo Day"	2014	7	—N/a	—	—	KOR: 332,066 (DL)	Solo Day
"Sweet Girl"	2015	11	—N/a	—	—	KOR: 137,175 (DL)	Sweet Girl
"It's Christmas"	2015	45	—N/a	—	—	KOR: 88,201 (DL)	Non-album single
"A Lie" (거짓말이야)	2016	8	—N/a	—	—	KOR: 246,119 (DL)	Good Timing
"Rollin'"	2017	24	—N/a	—	—	KOR: 110,281 (DL)	Rollin'
"A Day of Love" (반하는 날)	2019	—	—N/a	—	—		Non-album single
"Like A Movie" (영화처럼)	2020	145	—N/a	—	—		Origine
"10 Times"	2021	— (Note: "10 Times" did not enter the Gaon Digital Chart, but appeared at number 102 on the component Download chart.)	—N/a	—	—		Non-album singles
"Adore You" (거대한 말)	2021	— (Note: "Adore" did not enter the Gaon Digital Chart, but appeared at number 46 on the component Download chart.)	—N/a	—	—		Non-album singles
"Rewind"	2024	—	—	—			Connect
"Rock Paper Scissors" (가위바위보)	2026	— (Note: "Rock Paper Scissors" did not enter the Circle Digital Chart, but appeared at number 36 on the component Download chart.)	—	—	—		Set
Japanese
"Beautiful Target"	2012	—	—N/a	4	8	JPN: 36,521	1
"Oyasumi Good Night"	2012	—	—N/a	4	11	JPN: 37,961	1
"What's Happening? What - Why?"	2013	—	—N/a	3	4	JPN: 47,646	2
"Solo Day"	2014	—	—N/a	3	3	JPN: 47,479	3
"White Miracle"	2015	—	—N/a	3	—	JPN: 69,477	3
"Happy Days"	2015	—	—N/a	3	—	JPN: 39,953	3
"You and I"	2017	—	—N/a	6	—	JPN: 16,216	4
"Follow Me"	2017	—	—N/a	24	—	JPN: 4,056	4
"Do You Remember"	2018	—	—N/a	2	—	JPN: 13,090	5
"Aerumade"	2018	—	—N/a	5	—	JPN: 25,316	5
"—" denotes releases that did not chart or were not released in that region. Note: Billboard Korea K-Pop Hot 100 was introduced in August 2011 and discontinued in July 2014.

== Other charted songs ==
Title	Year	Peak chart positions	Album
Title	Year	KOR	Album
"If…"	2012	78	In the Wind
"I Won't Do Bad Things"	2012	82	In the Wind
"What Do You Want To Do"	2012	85	In the Wind
"By My Girl (Jinyoung Solo)"	2012	86	In the Wind
"Intro - Prologue"	2014	153	Who Am I
"Love Then"	2014	31	Who Am I
"Amazing"	2014	59	Who Am I
"Baby"	2014	45	Who Am I
"Oh My God"	2014	46	Who Am I
"Too Much (Sandeul + Gongchan)"	2014	49	Who Am I
"Pretty"	2014	44	Who Am I
"Who Am I"	2014	71	Who Am I
"Feel the Music"	2014	77	Who Am I
"Road"	2014	57	Who Am I
"Seoul"	2014	75	Who Am I
"You Make Me a Fool"	2014	54	Solo Day
"Are You Happy (With Him?)"	2014	62	Solo Day
"A Glass of Water"	2014	78	Solo Day
"Drive"	2014	81	Solo Day
"You feat. Sunmi"	2014	63	Solo Day
"Good Timing"	2016	84	Good Timing
"Crushing on You Again"	2016	89	Good Timing

== Featurings ==
Year	Title	Artist(s)	Album
2012	"Win The Day"	B1A4, Nichkhun, 4Minute, Junho, Dal Shabet, MBLAQ, Miss A, Nine Muses, ZE:A	Team SIII – Win The Day
2013	"You Are A Miracle"	Various Artists feat. B1A4	You Are A Miracle (2013 SBS Gayo Daejun Friendship Project)
2016	"A Fingertips Love"	B1A4, BTOB's Eunkwang & Changsub, Oh My Girl, April, etc.	"A Fingertips Love"

== Soundtrack appearances ==
Year	Title	Song	Peak chart positions	
Year	Title	Song	KOR	KOR Hot
2012	SBS Take Care of Us, Captain: Released: January 4, 2012	Track 1 : "Sky" - 3:58	80	—
2012	MBC The Thousandth Man: Released: August 14, 2012	Track 1: "Hey Girl" - 3:16	31	24
2013	MBC We Got Married Global Edition: Released: April 29, 2013	Track 1: "Sunshine" - 3:12	83	—
2013	tvN Reply 1994: Released: November 8, 2013	Track 3: "With You" - 3:12	18	14
"—" denotes releases that did not chart or were not released in that region.

== Music videos ==
Year	Music video	Length
2011	"O.K"	4:13
2011	"Only Learned the Bad Things"	3:43
2011	"Beautiful Target"	3:43
2011	"Beautiful Target" (ZOOM ZOOM Version)	3:23
2012	"BABY I'M SORRY"	3:38
2012	"Sleep Well, Good Night"	3:47
2012	"Beautiful Target" (Japanese Version)	3:41
2012	"Sleep Well, Good Night" (Japanese Version)	3:51
2012	"Tried to Walk"	3:59
2013	"What's Happening?"	3:23
2013	"What's Happening? What - Why?" (Japanese Version)	3:26
2013	"With You" (Reply 1994 OST)	3:15
2014	"Lonely"	4:14
2014	"Solo Day"	5:12
2014	"Solo Day" (Japanese Version)	5:13
2015	"White Miracle"	4:07
2015	"Sweet Girl"	4:08
2016	"A Lie"	3:39
2017	"Rollin'"	3:12
2019	"A Day of Love"	3:47
2020	"Like a Movie"	3:33
2024	"Rewind"	3:12

=== Collaboration ===
Year	Music video	Length	Other Performer(s)
2012	"Win The Day"	4:10	2PM's Junho and Nichkhun, 4Minute, Sistar, Dal Shabet, MBLAQ, Miss A, Nine Muses and ZE:A (2012 London Olympics - Samsung South Korea support song)
2013	"You Are A Miracle"	7:35	Lee Seung Chul, Kim Jo Han, Park Jin Young, Tiger JK, Yoon Mirae, Lee Hyori, Sung Si Kyung, Super Junior, Brown Eyed Girls, K. Will, Sunmi, Big Bang, KARA, Girls' Generation, SHINee, 2PM, IU, After School, 2NE1, 4Minute, f(x), B2ST, CNBlue, ZE:A, Infinite, miss A, Teen Top, Girl's Day, A Pink, Ailee, EXO, B.A.P. and more (2013 SBS Gayo Daejun Friendship Project)
