= CNU (singer) =

South Korean singer-songwriter and composer (born 1991)

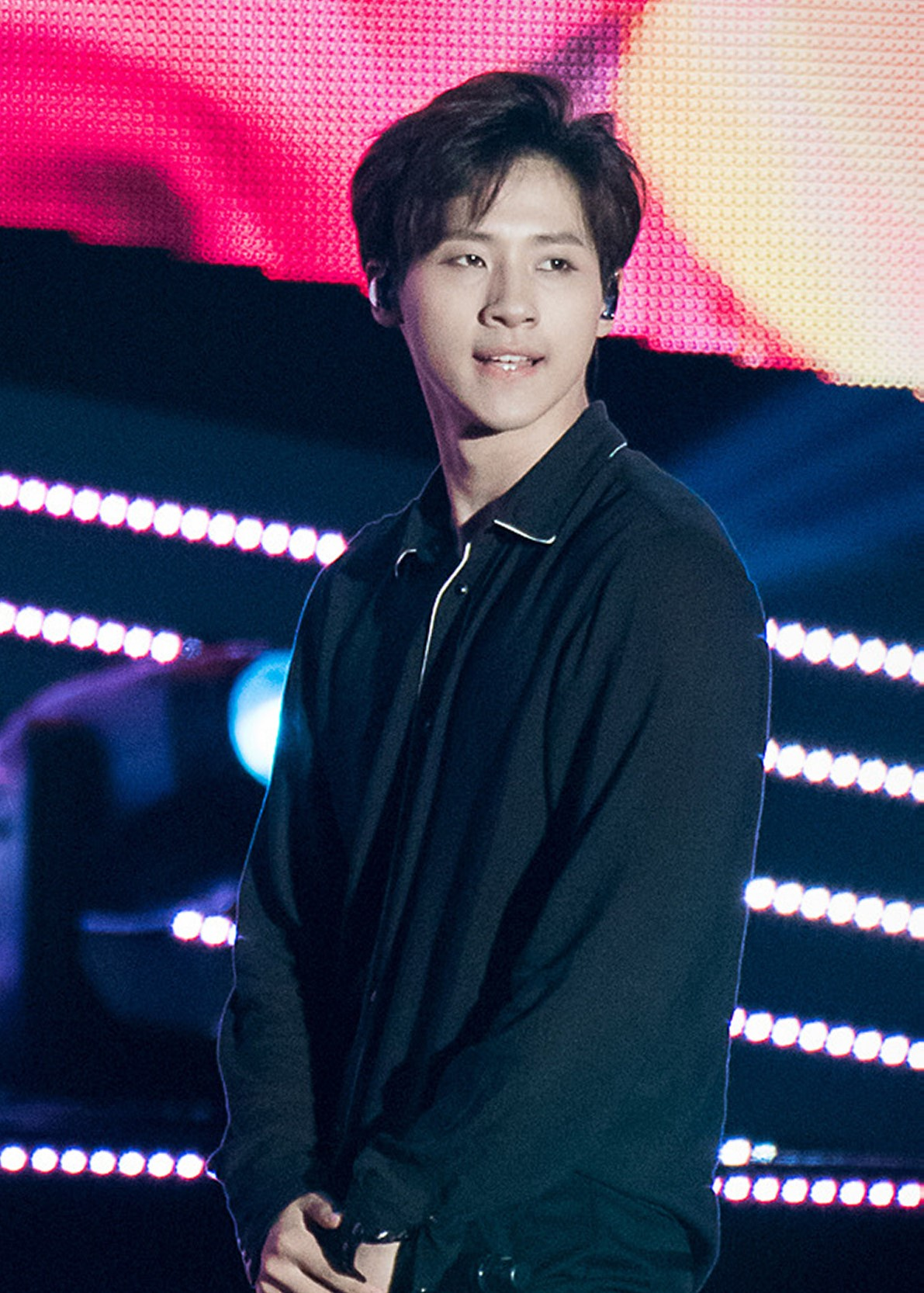
- CNU at WFMF concert in September 2016
- Born: Shin Dong-woo; June 16, 1991 (age 35); Cheongju, North Chungcheong, South Korea
- Other name: CNU
- Education: Hanyang University
- Occupations: Singer; songwriter; composer; actor
- Musical career
- Genre: K-pop
- Instrument: Vocals
- Years active: 2011–present
- Label: WM
- Member of: B1A4
- Website: B1A4's Website

Korean name
- Hangul: 신동우
- Hanja: 申東佑
- RR: Sin Dongu
- MR: Sin Tongu

Shin Dong-woo (Korean: 신동우, born June 16, 1991), known professionally as CNU, is a South Korean singer, songwriter, composer and actor. He is best known for being a member of the South Korean boy group B1A4. In 2012, he appeared in the KBS sitcom Sent from Heaven.

== Early life ==
Shin Dong-woo was born on June 16, 1991, in Cheongju, North Chungcheong, South Korea. He studied at Bongmyung High School. In his adolescence, he formed a rock band with his friend Jooyoung. He later studied at Hanyang University in the Department of Theater and Film.

== Career ==
CNU was revealed as a member of idol quintet B1A4 on April 15, 2011, where he served as a vocalist and rapper. The group debuted six days later with their debut mini album Let's Fly and lead single "OK". Since then, CNU has participated in B1A4's four studio albums and six EPs.

In May 2022, CNU's agency confirmed that CNU's solo fan meeting '2022 B1A4 BANA - HAPPY CNU DAY' was held on June 12, 2022.

== Discography ==
=== Soundtrack appearances ===
Title	Year	Peak chart positions	Album
Title	Year	KOR	Album
"The Way to Find Love" (사랑을 찾는 방법; Sarangeul Channeun Bangbeop)	2016	—	Cinderella with Four Knights OST
"No Problem" (괜찮아; Gwaenchanha) (with Baro)	2018	—	Prison Playbook OST
"Fly Away"	2022	—	Ghost Doctor OST
"Heigh-Ho"	2022	—	Find the 1st Prize OST
"—" denotes releases that did not chart or were not released in that region.

=== Production and songwriting credits ===
Year	Song	Album	Lyrics		Music	
Year	Song	Album	Credited	With	Credited	With
2011	"Wonderful Tonight"	It B1A4	Yes	Jinyoung & Baro	No	—N/a
2011	"Beautiful Target"	It B1A4	Yes	Baro & Urihyeong-gwa Naedongsaeng	No	—N/a
2012	"Wonderful Tonight" (Unplugged Remix)	Ignition	Yes	Jinyoung & Baro	No	—N/a
2012	"Beautiful Target" (Japanese version)	1	Yes	Baro, Urihyeong-gwa Naedongsaeng & Shoko Fujibayashi	No	—N/a
2013	"Good Love"	What's Happening?	Yes	Jinyoung & Baro	No	—N/a
2014	"Amazing"	Who Am I	Yes	Baro	No	—N/a
2014	"Feel with Music"	Who Am I	Yes	Go Hyung-suk	Yes	Jooyoung & Go Hyung-suk
2014	"Seoul"	Who Am I	Yes	Baro	Yes	Go Hyung-suk
2014	"Drive"	Solo Day	Yes	Baro	Yes	Jooyoung & Cheeze
2015	"Love Is Magic"	Sweet Girl	Yes	Baro	Yes	ZigZag Note
2015	"Let's Be Happy"	Sweet Girl	Yes	Baro	Yes	Choi Myeong-hwan
2016	"Somebody to Love"	3	Yes	Baro, Meg.Me	Yes	Choi Myeong-hwan
2016	"Nightmare"	Good Timing	Yes	Baro	Yes	Gureum
2016	"Sparkling"	Good Timing	Yes	Baro	Yes	RWAM
2016	"To My Star"	Good Timing	Yes	Baro	Yes	Gureum
2017	"Love You Love You"	4	Yes	UNO Blaqlo	Yes	RWAM
2017	"Blue Moon"	4	Yes	SoichiroK	Yes	RWAM
2017	"Thank You Hate You"	4	Yes	Narumi Yamamoto	Yes	Choi Myeong-hwan
2017	"Call Me"	Rollin'	Yes	Baro	Yes	Choi Myeong-hwan
2018	"Mommy Mommy"	Aerumade	Yes	RWAM, Kurt, Haru	Yes	RWAM, Kurt
2018	"Maze" (迷路)	5	Yes	Haru	Yes	Choi Myeong-hwan
2018	"Every Time"	5	Yes	Baro, Dew	Yes	Choi Myeong-hwan
2019	"A Day of Love"	—N/a	Yes	—	Yes	Kwak Woo-ram
2019	"사선 (斜線) (Oblique Line)"	One Fine Day	Yes	—	Yes	RWAM, Houdini
2020	"Like a Movie" (영화처럼)	Origine	Yes	RWAM	Yes	RWAM, Lee Hansol
2020	"What Is Love?" (오렌지색 하늘은 무슨 맛일까?)	Origine	Yes	RWAM	Yes	RWAM
2020	"Diving"	Origine	Yes	RWAM	Yes	Sandeul, RWAM
2020	"Zero Gravity" (CNU solo) (feat. Bibi) (무중력)	Origine	Yes	—	Yes	Houdini
2020	"Wind" (바람)	Origine	Yes	—	Yes	RWAM
2020	"Let's Fly" (나르샤)	Origine	Yes	—	Yes	Houdini, RWAM
2020	"Tonight"	Origine	Yes	—	Yes	RWAM
2020	"For BANA" (더 뜨겁게 사랑할 여름에 만나요)	Origine	Yes	Sandeul, Gongchan, RWAM	Yes	Sandeul, RWAM, Jeong Wangi
2024	"Rewind"	Connect	Yes	RWAM	Yes	RWAM, Lee Hansol
2024	"Back to You" (시간을 지나 마주한 너)	Connect	Yes	RWAM	Yes	RWAM
2024	"Pause"	Connect	Yes	RWAM	Yes	RWAM
2024	"Still in My Heart" (이별은 없는 거야)	Connect	Yes	Sandeul, Gongchan	No	Sandeul, Team Columbus

== Filmography ==
=== Television series ===
Year	Title	Role	Notes	Ref.
2012	Sent from Heaven	Shin-woo		
2018	Ms. Ma, Nemesis	Bae Do-hwan		
2022	O'PENing – Find the 1st Prize	Kim Hyun-woo	one act-drama; Season 5	

=== Music video appearances ===
Year	Song title	Artist	Album
2013	"Frozen"	Shin Bora	First Single Album 꽁꽁

== Musical theater ==
Year	Title	Role	Notes
2015	Chess	Anatoly Karpov	
2016	The Three Musketeers	d'Artagnan	
2017	Hamlet	Hamlet	
2021	Gwangju	Park Han Su	
