= Solo Day =

EP by B1A4
- Released: July 14, 2014
- Recorded: 2014
- Genre: K-pop, dance-pop
- Language: Korean
- Label: WM Entertainment

B1A4 chronology
2 (2014)	Solo Day (2014)	Sweet Girl (2015)

Singles from Solo Day
- 1. "Solo Day" Released: July 14, 2014

Solo Day is the fifth mini-album released by B1A4 under WM Entertainment. The album was released on July 14, 2014 by WM Entertainment and their distributing label Pony Canyon Korea. The title song of the album, "Solo Day, was produced by leader Jinyoung along with 5 other tracks in the album. CNU also produced 1 song in the album.

== Background ==
There are 5 pictures: Jinyoung is "Couch Potato", Sandeul is "Pizza Delivery" Guy, CNU is "Obsession Guy", Baro is a "Space Geek" and Gongchan is a "Flower Vagabond". There is a 22-second video with a game trailer. There are also more videos on YouTube in the official channel of B1A4, B1A4 OFFICIAL +: #1 DRIVE, #2 BEACH, #3 RUN AWAY, #4 UFO?, #5 ENCOUNTER, and #6 FIVE BOYS.

== Music video ==
In the music video "Drive" shows a road. "Beach" has an upward view of B1A4 walking on the beach. "Run Away" has B1A4 running on the beach. #4 UFO? has Baro trying to show Sandeul, Gongchan, Jinyoung, and CNU his headphones that make him look like an alien, the rest of B1A4 is focused on a UFO. #5 ENCOUNTER shows the UFO B1A4 was looking at in #4 UFO?.#6 FIVE BOYS shows the five from B1A4 writing "B1A4" on the beach. All these teaser videos show little parts of the whole music video of Solo Day which was released on July 13, 2014. The official music video of Solo Day was released on July 14, 2014.

== Track listing ==
No.	Title	Lyrics	Music	Length
1.	"Solo Day"	Jinyoung, Baro	Jinyoung	3:19
2.	"You Make Me A Fool" (내가 뭐가돼; Naega Mwogadwae)	Jinyoung, Baro	Jinyoung	3:29
3.	"Are You Happy (With Him?)" (잘돼가; Jaldwaega)	Jinyoung, Baro, Maxx Song	Jinyoung, 220, Brian Cho, Maxx Song	3:35
4.	"A Glass of Water" (물한잔; Mulhanjan)	Jinyoung, Baro	Jinyoung	3:23
5.	"Drive"	CNU, Baro	CNU, Jooyoung, Cheeze	3:45
6.	"You" (feat. Sunmi)	Jinyoung	Jinyoung	3:22
Total length:				20:53

== Charts ==
Chart (2014)	Peak position
Gaon Album Chart	1
Oricon Albums Chart	34

== See also ==
- List of Gaon Album Chart number ones of 2014
