= 1 (B1A4 album) =

- Regular edition cover

Studio album by B1A4
- Released: October 24, 2012
- Recorded: 2011–2012
- Genres: J-pop, Dance-pop
- Language: Japanese
- Label: Pony Canyon

B1A4 chronology
Ignition (2012)	1 (2012)	In the Wind (2012)

Singles from 1
- 1. "Beautiful Target" Released: June 27, 2012; 2. "Oyasumi Good Night" Released: August 29, 2012

1 is the Japanese debut studio album by the South Korean boy band B1A4. It was released on October 24, 2012 in three different editions.

== Background ==
The album was announced by the group's Korean agency, WM Entertainment, with details of the album release and along with a release of the group's first DVD B1A4 History 2011-2012 in Japan. The album was released in three different editions: a CD+DVD, including the CD and a DVD including the music videos of "Beautiful Target" and "Oyasumi Good Night", as well its making-of videos, a CD+Goods, including the CD and a special member figure (one out of five different types) and a regular edition, including the CD itself and a special trading card (one out of five different types). All editions came with a special lottery ticket to a Premium Event of their first Japanese album.

== Composition ==
The album is composed of ten songs: two singles, five new songs, and three Japanese versions of songs previously recorded in Korean. The tracks "O.K", "Only One" and "Waruikoto Bakari Manande" were originally recorded in Korean and released on the group's debut mini album Let's Fly.

== Singles ==
Two songs from the album were released as singles:

The first single from the album is a Japanese version of "Beautiful Target". It was released on June 27, 2012 as the group's Japanese debut single. The original version of the song, recorded in Korean, was released on the group's second mini album It B1A4. It peaked number 4 on Oricon's Weekly chart with around 38,000 copies sold to date.

The second and final single from the album is a Japanese version of "Baby Good Night", retitled in Japanese to "Oyasumi Good Night". It was released on August 29, 2012 and peaked number 4 in Oricon's Weekly chart with around 39,000 copies sold to date. The original version of the song, recorded in Korean, was released on the special version of the group's first Korean album, Ignition.

== Track listing ==
CD+DVD and CD+Goods tracklist
No.	Title	Lyrics	Music	Length
1.	"Beautiful Lie"	Goro Matsui, Baro (Rap making)	Jinyoung	3:34
2.	"Oyasumi Good Night" (おやすみ good night; Sleep Well, Good Night) (JPN ver.)	Jinyoung Baro MEG.ME (Japanese lyrics)	Jinyoung, Baro	3:21
3.	"Empty Mind"	Takafumi Fujino, Steven Lee	Steven Lee	3:43
4.	"Waruikoto Bakari Manande" (悪いことばかり学んで; Only Learned Bad Things) (JPN ver.)	Wheesung, Goro Matsui (Japanese lyrics), Baro (Rap making)	Lim Sang-hyuk, Jeon Da-woon, Lee Sang-ho	3:44
5.	"Tipping Point"	Goro Matsui	Huba Kelemen, Jack David Elliott, Joleen Belle	3:40
6.	"Wake Me Up"	Goro Matsui	T-SK, Kim Tesung, Andrew Choi	3:32
7.	"Only One" (JPN ver.)	Hwang Sung-jin, Goro Matsui (Japanese lyrics), Baro (Rap making)	Lee Ju-hyung, Lee Sang-ho	3:36
8.	"Beautiful Target" (JPN ver.)	CNU, Baro, Urihyeong-gwa Naedongsaeng, Shoko Fujibayashi (Japanese lyrics)	Urihyeong-gwa Naedongsaeng	3:22
9.	"One Love"	B & C Factory	Tesung Kim, Cha Cha Malone, Casper, No Day	3:33

CD only and iTunes Store track
No.	Title	Lyrics	Music	Length
10.	"O.K" (JPN ver.)	Geul Gong-jang, Shoko Fujibayashi (Japanese lyrics), Baro (Rap making)	Seo Young-bae	3:33

DVD (CD+DVD edition)
No.	Title	Length
1.	"Beautiful Target" (Music video - Japanese version)
2.	"Oyasumi Good Night" (Music video - Japanese version)
3.	"Beautiful Target" (Music video - Making-of)
4.	"Oyasumi Good Night" (Music video - Making-of)

== Charts ==
=== Oricon ===
Oricon Chart	Peak	Debut sales	Sales total
Daily Singles Chart	2	10,372	23,338+
Weekly Singles Chart	5	20,547	23,338+
Monthly Singles Chart	21	22,639	23,338+

== Release history ==
Country	Date	Format	Label
Japan	October 24, 2012	CD, Digital download, DVD	Pony Canyon
Brazil	September 29, 2014	CD	Youkai Entertainment
Brazil	November 30, 2014	CD, DVD	Youkai Entertainment
