= Jung Jin-young (singer) =

South Korean singer and actor (born 1991)

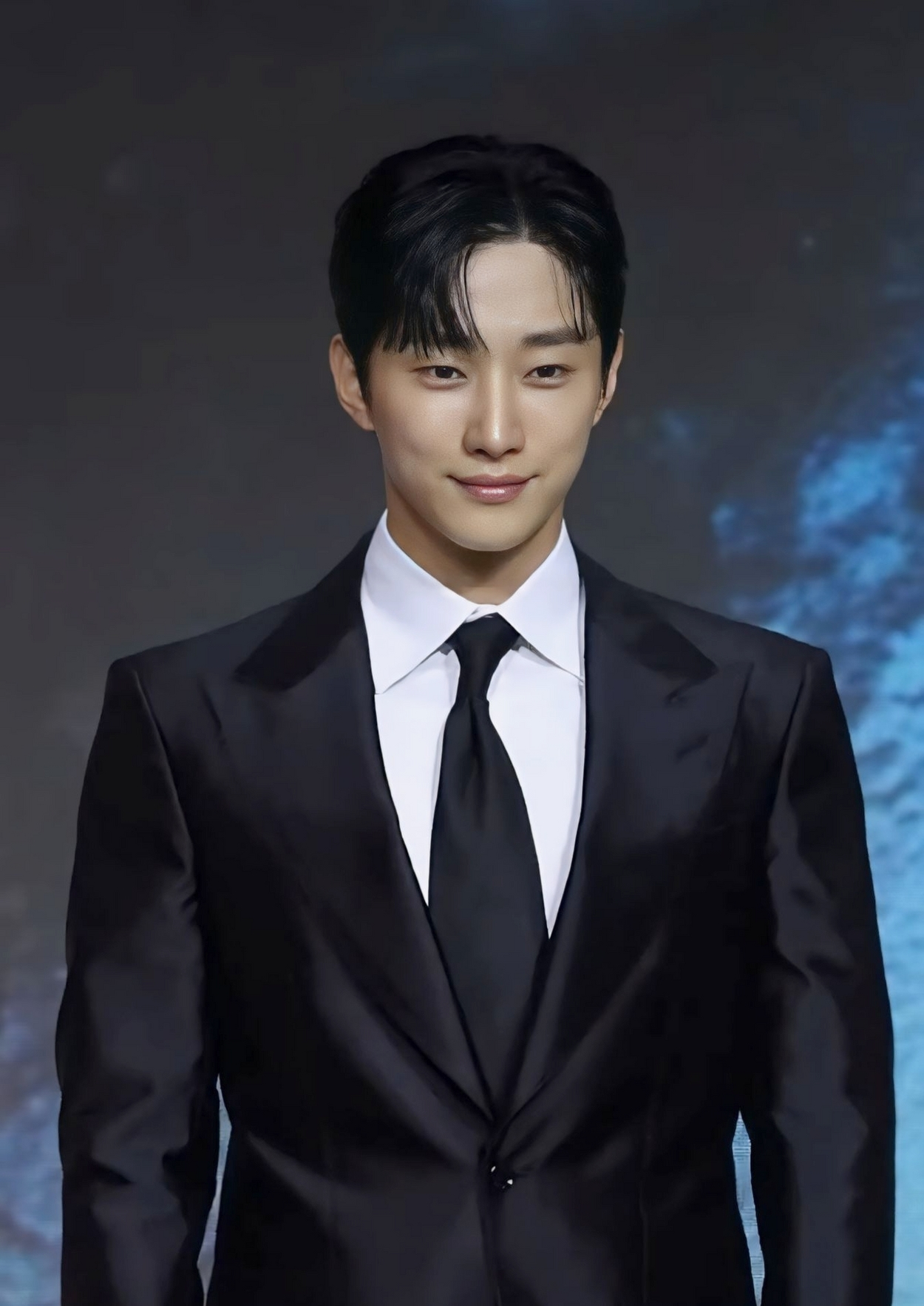
- Jung in July 2024
- Born: November 18, 1991 (age 34); Chungju, South Korea
- Other name: Jinyoung
- Occupations: Singer; songwriter; record producer; actor
- Agent: Management Run (Acting) Karon Universe (YouTube)
- Musical career
- Genre: K-pop
- Instrument: Vocals
- Years active: 2011–present
- Label: WM
- Formerly of: B1A4

Korean name
- Hangul: 정진영
- Hanja: 鄭振永
- RR: Jeong Jinyeong
- MR: Chŏng Chinyŏng

Jung Jin-young (Korean: 정진영; born November 18, 1991), professionally known as Jinyoung, is a South Korean singer, songwriter, record producer, and actor. He was a member of boy group B1A4, being its former leader. He is currently managed by Management Run. He has also gained recognition with the television series Sweet Home (2020), Love in the Moonlight (2016) and Police University (2021).

== Career ==
=== 2011–2018: B1A4 ===
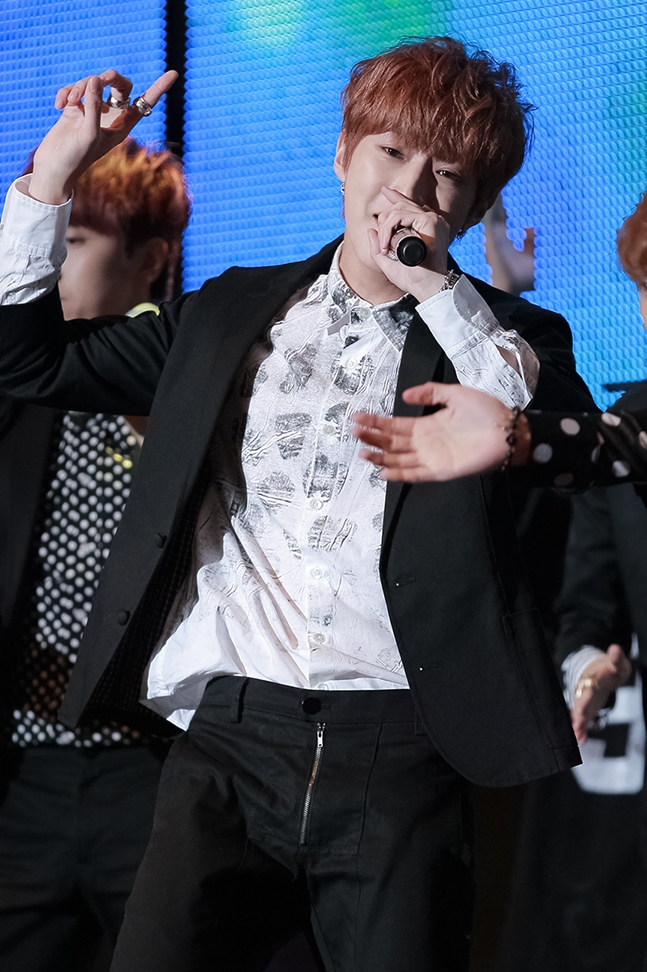
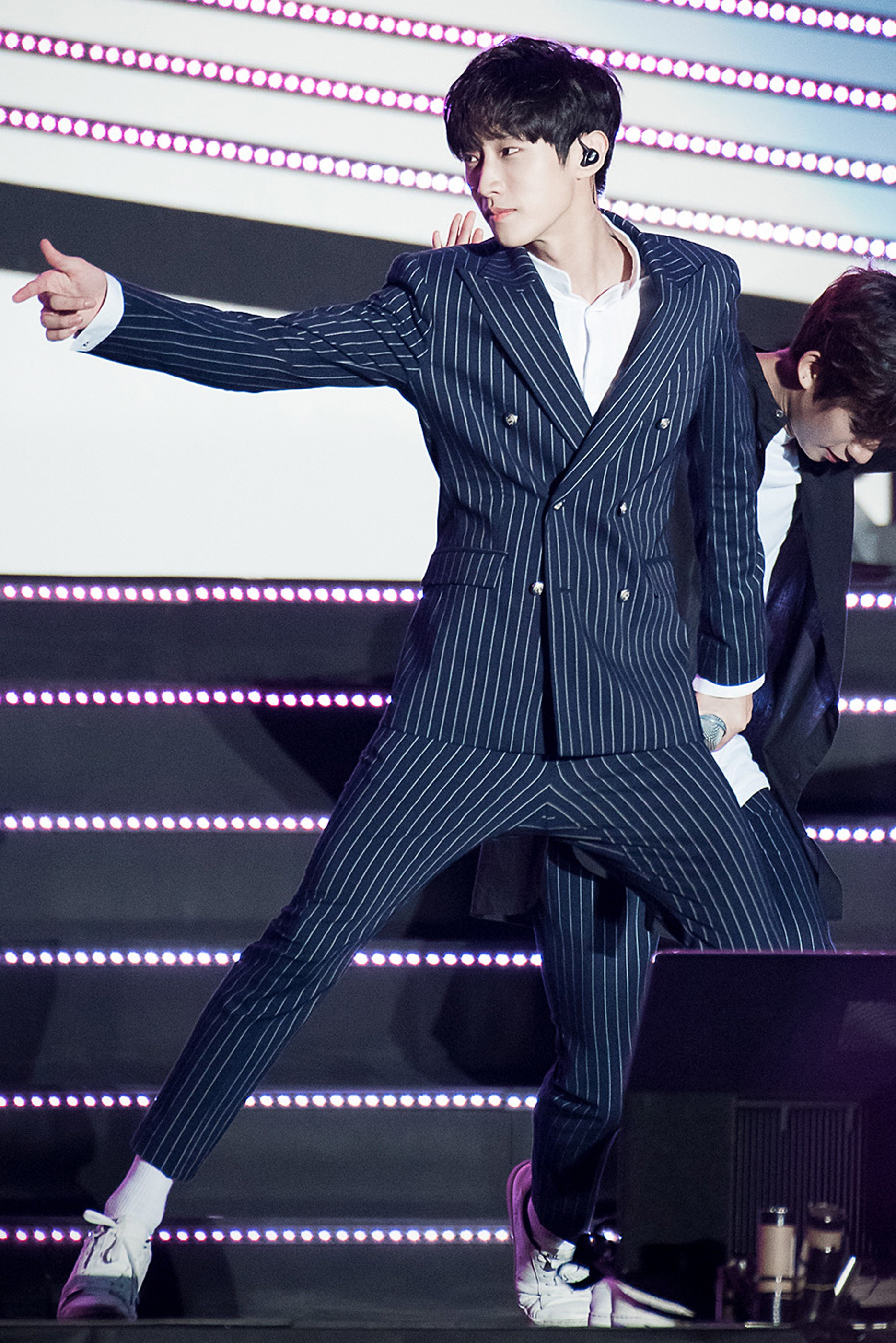
Jung in 2013 and 2016

Jung was discovered on Cyworld through a photo of himself posted on the website. He trained for roughly two years on singing, composing and acting before joining B1A4.

Jung was the first member of B1A4 revealed to the public on April 11, 2011. The group made their debut stage on April 23, 2011, on MBC's Show! Music Core.

On June 30, 2018, WM Entertainment confirmed that Jung and Baro had left the agency following the end of their contracts. Their activities with the group remain in discussion. On November 16, WM Entertainment has announced that Jung and Baro will be leaving the agency, with the remaining three members – CNU, Sandeul, and Gongchan – to continue promoting as B1A4.

=== 2012–present: Solo career ===
Jung first gained attention for his composing skills with B1A4's comeback title track, "Baby I'm Sorry" (2012), where musical professionals praised him.

In 2013, he made his acting debut in tvN's drama She is Wow. The following year, he made his film debut in Miss Granny. He also wrote the ending song of the movie.

In 2015, he starred in Mnet's musical drama Persevere, Goo Hae-ra, where he drew praise for his acting. Later that year, he starred in the Hong sisters' romantic comedy drama Warm and Cozy.

Jung took part in producing the songs "In the Same Place" and "When Cherry Blossoms Fade" for Mnet's 2016 reality survival program Produce 101. This was the first time he composed songs for a girl group, and he received praise for his capabilities and versatility as a composer. He was named the "No.1 solo composer" of 2016. The same year, he starred in KBS's youth historical drama Love in the Moonlight. The drama was a hit and led to increased recognition for Jung as an actor. Jung reunited with Moonlight co-star Chae Soo-bin a year later in the two-episode drama special If We Were a Season (2017).

In October 2017, it was confirmed that Jung would star in upcoming body-swap comedy film The Dude in Me. The film was released in January 2019.

In 2018, Jung was cast in Netflix's youth romance drama My First First Love and the web drama Wind-Bell in October of the same year.

Also, in 2018, a book named "K-pop makers" about the k-pop musicians market-movers was released. Jung was featured as one of the eight hidden gems and hidden producers of South Korea, together with Big Hit Entertainment Pdogg, SM Entertainment London Noise, Mystic Story Postino, CNBLUE Jong Yong-hwa, Urban Zakapa Kwon Soon-il and Super Freak Records Jinbo.

On June 20, 2019, Jung enlisted in the military service and he returned to the industry on April 9, 2021. His first comeback drama was a well-received drama known as Police University (2021) which brought KBS drama viewership ratings back to a high of 8.5% at its highest and an average of 6.5% in the Mon-Tue 9:30 pm (KST) timeslot after the predecessor had a viewership rate hovering around 1–2%.

In January 2022, Jung dubbed the character Johnny in Sing 2 and Sing 2 was the Top movie released by Lotte Entertainment when the COVID-19 pandemic just started its slow recovery. Out of the 200 movies listed in the South Korea box office for 2022, it was ranked 25th, an impressive effort as it was on the initial tip of the curve of recovery.

On June 23, 2022, Jung launched his YouTube Channel and released a teaser video for Everything that inspires me, announcing that he would be releasing a series of no copyright music periodically so that people working in the creative works industry can use his music freely. Following that on June 25, 2022, he released It was a First Love, the first No Copyright Sound track.

On September 9, 2022, Jung participated in the Young Actors' Retreat aka Youth MT which was released on OTT Viu which is available in 16 markets. It was notable that Jung's No-copyright-music such as "It Was A First Love" and more were featured in the variety show.

Similarly, in the dating reality show, Love Alarm : If you like it, it will ring, where Jung was the MC of the show with 3 other hosts, his No-copyright-music were also used in the various episodes.

In March 2023, Jung was invited to be one of the 4 mentor/producers for the survival show Fantasy Boys. He was the Chief Mentor producer in the 3rd semester of the show where he guided the contestants to present a performance based on the cover of 4 songs by BTS, EXO, Winners and Stray Kids. in the semi-finals, he composed the music and lyrics and produced "Hold Tight" for his group "Flash" of 7 boys of average ranking from previous performances' result. In the end, 6 out of the 7 boys entered the finals after performing his song and 3 of the boys even emerged in the Top 12.

On August 31, 2023, Jinyoung and Yoona were appointed as the DB Insurance ambassadors who delivered the "Together Promise" message. It was a big advertisement campaign involving basketball stars and the song "Together Promise" (full version of the song) was written and produced by Jinyoung.

== Discography ==
=== Soundtrack appearances ===
List of soundtrack appearances, showing year released, and name of the album
Title	Year	Album
"The Day I Meet You" (당신과 만난 이날) (with Min Hyo-rin, featuring Baro)	2015	Persevere, Goo Hae Ra OST
"Oh, My Love" (널 만난 이후) (with Min Hyo-rin)	2015	Persevere, Goo Hae Ra OST
"A Short Wait" (작은 기다림) (with U Sung-eun)	2015	Persevere, Goo Hae Ra OST
"I'm in Love" (with U Sung-eun)	2015	Persevere, Goo Hae Ra OST
"She is smiling" (그녀가 웃잖아) (with U Sung-eun, Min Hyo-rin, Ulala Session)	2015	Persevere, Goo Hae Ra OST
"Station" (정류장) (with Kwak Si-yang)	2015	Persevere, Goo Hae Ra OST
"For this Love" (이 사랑을)	2016	100 Days My Prince OST Part 2
"You're saying you are mine" (그댄 내꺼라고 말하는 거예요)	2019	Perfume OST Part 5
"I'm into you, I mean I love you" (좋아해, 아니 사랑해)	2021	Yeonnom OST Part 4
"You said you didn't know love" (넌 사랑을 모른다 했지)	2021	Morning Kiss at Tiffany's OST Part 2
"You are the Apple of My Eye" (Korean: 그 시절, 우리가 좋아했던 소녀) (with Dahyun)	2025	You're The Apple of My Eye OST Part 2 (Korean version)
=== "Timeless" (Chinese : 此刻永远 ） (with 9m88 Taiwanese singer and song-writer) ===	2025	The Photo from 1977 (那张照片里的我们） OST

=== Songwriting credits ===
==== B1A4 ====
Jinyoung is known for composing several title tracks and songs for B1A4's albums.

Song	Year	Album
"Bling Girl"	2011	Let's Fly
"Wonderful Tonight"	2011	It B1A4
"**Baby I'm Sorry**"	2012	Ignition
"Feeling"	2012	Ignition
"Wonderful Tonight (Unplugged Remix)"	2012	Ignition
"**Baby Good Night (잘자요 굿나잇)**"	2012	Ignition: Special Ed.
"너때문에 (Because of You)"	2012	Ignition: Special Ed.
"Beautiful Lie"	2012	1
"Intro – In The Wind"	2012	In The Wind
"**Tried To Walk (걸어 본다)**"	2012	In The Wind
"뭐 할래요 (What Do You Want To Do)"	2012	In The Wind
**"What's Happening? (이게무슨일이야)"**	2013	What's Going On
"Good Love"	2013	What's Going On
"Intro – Prologue"	2014	Who Am I
**"Lonely (없구나)"**	2014	Who Am I
"사랑 그땐 [Feat.하림] (Love Then [Feat. Harim])"	2014	Who Am I
"Baby"	2014	Who Am I
"예뻐 (Pretty)"	2014	Who Am I
"Who Am I"	2014	Who Am I
**"Solo Day"**	2014	Solo Day
"내가 뭐가 돼 (You Make Me a Fool)"	2014	Solo Day
"잘 돼가 (It's Going Well)"	2014	Solo Day
"물 한잔 (A Glass Of Water)"	2014	Solo Day
"You (feat. Sunmi)"	2014	Solo Day
"Tell Me Why"	2014	Solo Day -Japanese ver.-
**"Sweet Girl"**	2015	Sweet Girl
"You Are a Girl I'm a Boy"	2015	Sweet Girl
"After 10 Years (10년 후)"	2015	Sweet Girl
"Wait"	2015	Sweet Girl
|"モッポンゴヤ 〜見なかったことに... (I Didn't See It)"	2016	3
"白いキセキ (White Miracle)"	2016	3
"Happy Days"	2016	3
"Intro – Time"	2016	Good Timing
"A Lie (거짓말이야)"'	2016	Good Timing
"너에게 한 번 더 반하는 순간 (Moment I Fall For You Again)"	2016	Good Timing
"Good Timing"	2016	Good Timing
"꿍에 (In Dreams)"	2016	Good Timing
"멜랑꼴리 (Melancholy)"	2016	Good Timing
"내가 널 첮을게 (I'll Find You)"	2016	Good Timing
"Drunk On You"	2016	Good Timing
"함께 (Together)"	2016	Good Timing
"눈이 오면 (When It Snows)"	2016	Good Timing
**"好きだからしょうがない"**	2017	4
"Follow Me"	2017	4
"You and I"	2017	4
"Light on"	2017	4
"二人で"	2017	4
**"Rollin'"**	2017	Rollin'
"너는 내가 필요해 (You Need Me)"	2017	Rollin'
"Love Emotion"	2017	Rollin'
"Smile Mask"	2017	Rollin'
**"Do You Remember"**	2018	Do You Remember
**"会えるまで (Until We Meet)"**	2018	Aeru Made
"Lost"	2018	Aeru Made
"I Need You"	2018	5
"Who are you (feat. MACO)"	2018	5
"You Are"' – gift for fans	2019	—N/a
**Bold** denotes the title track of that album.

==== Others ====
Song	Year	Artist	Album/Program/Drama/Movie
Sesame Player Theme Song (B1A4 series)	2012	B1A4	Sesame Player OST
"한번더" (Once More)	2014	Shim Eun-kyung	Miss Granny OST
**Companion** 동행	2014	Joo Hyun-mi	Million Seller
"**같은 곳에서 (In the Same Place)**"	2016	소녀온탑 (Girls on Top)	Produce 101 – 35 Girls 5 Concepts
"한 발짝 두 발짝 (One Step, Two Steps)"	2016	Oh My Girl	Pink Ocean
"벚꽃이 지면 (When Cherry Blossoms Fade)"	2016	I.O.I	Chrysalis
"Misty Road"	2016	Ben	Love in the Moonlight OST
"잠깐만 (Hold On)"	2016	I.O.I	Miss Me?
**"Deep Blue Eyes"**	2017	Girls Next Door	Idol Drama Operation Team
"Be the Light"	2019	Himself	Hero Cantare Game OST
"좋아해, 아니 사랑해" (I'm into you, I mean Love You)	2021	Himself	웹툰 연놈 (Webtoon Yeonnom) OST Part 4
"남아있어" (Stay)	2021	Yuju	경찰수업 (Police University) OST Part 5
"넌 사랑을 모른다 했지" (You Said You Didn't Know Love)	2021	Himself	티파니에서 모닝 키스를 (Morning Kiss at Tiffany's) OST Part 2
"It Was A First Love"	2022	—N/a	No Copyright Music on YouTube, SoundCloud, TikTok
"MidSummer's Night Dream"	2022	—N/a	No Copyright Music on YouTube, SoundCloud, TikTok
"Don't Wanna Lose You"	2022	—N/a	No Copyright Music on YouTube, SoundCloud, TikTok
"How Can You Love Me"	2022	—N/a	No Copyright Music on YouTube, SoundCloud, TikTok
"Let Me Know"	2022	—N/a	No Copyright Music on YouTube, SoundCloud, TikTok
"Hold Tight"	2023	Flash; Himself (Guide version)	Fantasy Boys - Mentor Producer Song (Semi Finals)
"Together Promise"	2023	Himself	DB Insurance TV CF
**"돌아봐줄래 (Let Me Love)"**	2024	Unicode	Hello, World!
" 그 시절, 우리가 좋아했던 소녀 (You are the Apple of My Eye) "	2025	Himself/Dahyun	You're The Apple of My Eye OST Part 2 (Korean version)
"웃으며 안녕 (Goodbye with a Smile)"	2026	I.O.I	Album "Loop" Track 6
**Bold** denotes title track.

== Filmography ==
=== Film ===
Year	Title	Role	Notes	Ref.
2014	Miss Granny	Ban Ji-ha		
2019	The Dude in Me	Kim Dong-hyun		
2022	Sing 2	Johnny (voice)	Korean dub	
2025	You Are the Apple of My Eye	Goo Jin-woo		
2025	The Photo from 1997	TKD Coach Kim		
2026	Mr. Shota's Last Business Trip	Daesung		*

=== Television series ===
Year	Title	Role	Notes	Ref.
2012	The Thousandth Man		Cameo	
2013	She Is Wow	Gong Min-gyu		
2015	Persevere, Goo Hae-ra	Kang Se-chan / Ray Kim		
2015	Warm and Cozy	Jung Poong-san		
2016	Love in the Moonlight	Kim Yoon-sung		
2017	If We Were a Season	Oh Dong-kyeong	KBS Drama Special	
2021	Police University	Kang Sun-ho		
2023	My Perfect Stranger	Hae-jun and Yoon-young's son	Cameo (episode 16)	
2024	Who Is She	Daniel Han / Han Jun-hyeok		
2025	Ms. Incognito	Jeon Dong-min		
2026	Summer Vacation	Jo Yu-gyeom		

=== Web series ===
Year	Title	Role	Notes	Ref.
2015	Love Detective Sherlock K	Geum Kang-san		
2019	Wind-Bell	Daniel		
2019	My First First Love	Seo Do-Hyun	Season 1–2	
2023–2024	Sweet Home	Park Chan-young	Season 2–3	

=== Television shows ===
Year	Title	Role	Notes	Ref.
2014	KBS Million Seller	Contestant	Composer Ep 1–2 ("Companion", 2nd place, youngest composer)	
2016	God of Music 2	Cast member		
2016	King of Mask Singer	Contestant	as "Don't Make Me Cry Coward Lion" (episode 85)	
2017	Idol Drama Operation Team	Music producer		
2017	Master Key Season 1	Player	Team Red, Ep 1	
2019	우리동네 피터팬 My Neighbourhood Peter Pan	Narrator	Mangwon Market Tofu Shop, Chairman Kim Episode x 4	
2019	"The Spring of 100 Years" of the March 1st Independence Movement	MC	with Kim Yoo-jung (Independence Hall of Korea)	
2021	76th Police Day Celebrations	MC	with a uniformed police lady	
2022	77th anniversary ~ "600 Years of Road Opened"	MC	with Shin Ye-eun (Blue House)	
2023	Fantasy Boys	Producer	Composed music and lyrics and produced for song "Hold Tight" for semi-finals	
2023	19th Jecheon International Music & Film Festival	MC	with Kim Ye-won	
2025	32nd Hanteo Music Awards	MC	with Miyeon (from G-idle) 15-16 Feb	

=== Web shows ===
Year	Title	Role	Ref.
2022	Young Actors' Retreat	Cast member (Team LITM)	
2022	Love Alarm: If you like it, it will ring! (좋아하면 울리는 짝!짝!짝! )	MC	

== Awards and nominations ==
Name of the award ceremony, year presented, category, nominee of the award, and the result of the nomination
Award ceremony	Year	Category	Nominee / Work	Result	Ref.
APAN Star Awards	2025	Asia Star Award	Jinyoung	Won	
Asia Artist Awards	2018	Choice Award	Love in the Moonlight	Won	
Asia Model Awards	2025	Asia Star Award – Actor	Jinyoung	Won	
Baeksang Arts Awards	2017	Best New Actor – Television	Love in the Moonlight	Nominated	
Daejeon Over the Top Awards of the 2024 Daejeon Special Film Festival	2024	Global Star Award	Sweet Home 2	Won	
Chungju Mideok Foundation Awards	2025	Virtue Award	Jinyoung	Won	
Director's Cut Awards	2019	Best New Actor	The Dude in Me	Nominated	
KBS Drama Awards	2016	Best New Actor	Love in the Moonlight	Won	
KBS Drama Awards	2016	Netizen Award, Actor	Love in the Moonlight	Nominated	
KBS Drama Awards	2021	Excellence Award, Actor in a Miniseries	Police University	Nominated	
KBS Drama Awards	2021	Popularity Award, Actor	Police University	Won	
KBS Drama Awards	2021	Best Couple Award	Jinyoung (with Cha Tae-hyun); Police University	Won	
Korea Drama Awards	2017	Best New Actor	Love in the Moonlight	Nominated	
K-pop Idol Brand Awards	2018	Idol Actor of the Year	Love in the Moonlight	Won	
Max Movie Awards	2015	Best Supporting Actor	Miss Granny	Nominated	
Minnesota WebFest Awards	2019	Best Dramatic Performance	Wind-Bell	Won	
Newsis K-Expo Cultural Awards	2022	President of the Council of Culture, Sports and Tourism Award	Jinyoung	Won	
Seoul International Youth Film Festival	2014	Best Male Actor	Miss Granny	Nominated	
