= BABA B1A4 =

2012–13 concert tour by B1A4

- Continental tour by B1A4
- Promotional poster for the concert
- Location: Asia
- Associated album: Various
- Start date: 8 December 2012
- End date: 12 March 2013
- Legs: 1
- No. of shows: 8 in Asia
- Website: superjunior.smtown.com

B1A4 concert chronology
- BABA B1A4 (2012-2013); BABA B1A4 in Japan (2013)

BABA B1A4 was the first concert of South Korean boy band B1A4. It opened on December 8, 2012, at the SK Handball Olympic Gymnasium at the Olympic Park, Seoul and ended the next day with tickets sold on October 18. BABA B1A4 had approximately 11,000 attendees.

== Background ==
The tour began at the SK Olympic Handball Gymnasium (a.k.a. Olympic Fencing Gymnasium) on December 8 and 9, 2012. It was reported on October 19, 2012, that all 8,000 tickets available were already sold out with an initial number of 75,000 people trying to visit the ticketing sites to purchase a ticket. After the success of the concert in South Korea, B1A4 also went on to present BABA B1A4 in Japan, Indonesia, and Taiwan.

== Set List ==
South Korea (December 8/9, 2012)

Main Set:

1. "Beautiful Target" ("Beautiful Target") (Remix)
2. "Bling Girl"
3. "In the Air"

MC Cut 1

1. "쮸쮸쮸" ("Chu Chu Chu")
2. "너 때문에" ("Because of You")
3. "너만 있으면" ("If...")

MC Cut 2

1. "걸어본다" ("Tried to Walk")
2. "못되 것만 배워서" ("Only Learned the Bad Things")
3. "THIS TIME IS OVER"

VTR: Short Play

1. "Left-Handed (Panic)" (Sandeul's solo)
2. "With Me (Wheesung)" (CNU's solo)
3. "둘만 있으면" ("The Two of Us") (BARO's solo)
4. "Yeolla" (BARO and CNU's duet)
5. "Would You Like to Sing with Me?" (Gongchan's solo)
6. "BE MY GIRL" (Jinyoung's solo)

VTR: Introducing B1A4시대 (B1A4 Generation)

1. "Tell Me Your Wish (Genie) (Girls' Generation)" ( Special Stage)
2. "뭐 할래요" ("What Do You Want to Do?")
3. "SO FINE"
4. "Feeling"
5. "SUPER SONIC"

VTR: Baby Goodnight

1. "잘자요 굿나잇" ("Sleep Well, Good Night")
2. "BABY I'M SORRY"

MC Cut 3

1. "OK"

Encore:

1. "Only One"
2. "YOU ARE MY GIRL"
Japan (January 26–27 & 29-30, 2013)

Main Set:

1. "Beautiful Target" ("Beautiful Target") [Japanese version]
2. "Bling Girl [Japanese version]"
3. "In the Air"

MC Cut 1

1. "쮸쮸쮸" ("Chu Chu Chu") [Japanese version]
2. "너 때문에" ("Because of You")
3. "너만 있으면" ("If...")

MC Cut 2

1. "걸어본다" ("Tried to Walk")
2. "못되 것만 배워서" ("Only Learned the Bad Things")
3. "THIS TIME IS OVER"

VTR: Short Play

1. "짝사랑 ("Crush")" (Sandeul's solo)
2. "With Me (Wheesung)" (CNU's solo)
3. "둘만 있으면" ("The Two of Us") (BARO's solo)
4. "Would You Like to Sing with Me?" (Gongchan's solo)
5. "BE MY GIRL" (Jinyoung's solo)

VTR: B1A4 in Japan

1. "Tipping Point"
2. "Empty Mind"
3. "Beautiful Lie"

VTR: Baby Goodnight

1. "おやすみ goodnight " ("Sleep Well, Good Night")
2. "Feeling"
3. "SUPER SONIC"
4. "BABY I'M SORRY"

MC Cut 3

1. "OK" [Japanese version]

Encore:

1. "Only One"
2. "YOU ARE MY GIRL"
3. "OK"
Taiwan (March 9, 2013)

Main Set:

1. "Beautiful Target" ("Beautiful Target")
2. "Bling Girl"

Get to Know B1A4

1. "너만 있으면" ("If...")

B1A4 Playtime

1. "쮸쮸쮸" ("Chu Chu Chu")
2. "뭐 할래요" ("What Do You Want to Do?")

Gongchan & Baro Playtime

VTR: Baby Goodnight

1. "잘자요 굿나잇" ("Sleep Well, Good Night") (Remix)
2. "걸어본다" ("Tried to Walk")

Talk

1. "OK"
2. "Only One"
3. "YOU ARE MY GIRL"

== Dates ==
Date	City	Country	Venue
December 8, 2012	Seoul	South Korea	SK Olympic Handball Gymnasium
December 9, 2012	Seoul	South Korea	SK Olympic Handball Gymnasium
January 26, 2013	Kobe	Japan	World Memorial Hall
January 27, 2013	Kobe	Japan	World Memorial Hall
January 29, 2013	Yokohama	Japan	Yokohama Arena
January 30, 2013	Yokohama	Japan	Yokohama Arena
March 9, 2013	Taipei	Taiwan	Taipei International Convention Center
March 12, 2013	Jakarta	Indonesia	Skenoo Hall
