= Good Timing =

Studio album by B1A4
- Released: November 28, 2016
- Recorded: 2016
- Genre: K-pop, dance-pop
- Language: Korean
- Label: WM Entertainment; LOEN Entertainment

B1A4 chronology
Sweet Girl (2015)	Good Timing (2016)	Rollin' (2017)

Singles from Good Timing
- 1. "A Lie (거짓말이야)" Released: November 28, 2016

Good Timing is the third full-length album released by B1A4 under WM Entertainment. The album was released on November 28, 2016, by WM Entertainment and distributed by LOEN Entertainment. The first single, "A Lie (거짓말이야)", was produced by Jinyoung along with 9 other songs on the album. CNU also composed 3 songs.

B1A4 made their comeback in approximately fifteen months since they last released their EP Sweet Girl, and nearly three years since their last studio album Who Am I.

== Release and promotion ==
On November 17, 2016, B1A4 has confirmed its comeback date to be November 28. On November 20, B1A4's Official Twitter account revealed individual teasers for each of the members. A few days later, the group dropped the album preview.

== Track listing ==
No.	Title	Lyrics	Music	Arrangement	Length
1.	"Time" (Intro)		Jinyoung, (Moon Jeonggyu) 문정규		1:02
2.	"A lie" (거짓말이야)	Jinyoung, Baro	Jinyoung	Jinyoung, Kang Myeongsin (강명신)	3:28
3.	"Crushing on You Again" (너에게 한 번 더 반하는 순간)	Jinyoung, Baro	Jinyoung	Jinyoung, Captain Planet (캡틴플래닛)	3:54
4.	"Good Timing"	Jinyoung, Baro	Jinyoung	Jinyoung Captain Planet (캡틴플래닛)	3:32
5.	"Nightmare" (악몽)	CNU, Baro	CNU, Gureum (구름)	Gureum (구름), humbert	3:25
6.	"In a Dream" (꿈에)	Jinyoung, Baro	Jinyoung	Jinyoung, Captain Planet (캡틴플래닛)	3:39
7.	"Sparkling"	CNU, Baro	CNU, RWAM (곽우랍)	RWAM (곽우랍)	3:37
8.	"To My Star"	CNU, Baro	CNU, Gureum (구름)	Gureum (구름)	3:06
9.	"Melancholy" (멜랑꼴리)	Jinyoung, Baro	Jinyoung	Jinyoung	3:07
10.	"I Will Find You" (내가 널 찾을게)	Jinyoung, Baro	Jinyoung	Jinyoung, Moon Jeonggyu (문정규)	3:37
11.	"Drunk on You"	Jinyoung, Baro	Jinyoung	Jinyoung, Kang Myeongsin (강명신)	3:05
12.	"Together" (함께)	Jinyoung	Jinyoung	Jinyoung, Moon Jeonggyu (문정규)	3:27
13.	"When It Snows (CD Only)" (눈이 오면)	Jinyoung, Baro	Jinyoung, Captain Planet (캡틴플래닛), Zigzagnote	Jinyoung, Captain Planet (캡틴플래닛), Zigzagnote
Total length:					38:48

== Charts ==
Chart (2016)	Peak position
Japanese Albums (Oricon)	50
South Korean Albums (Gaon)	1
US World Albums (Billboard)	9
