= In the Wind (EP) =

EP by B1A4
- Released: November 12, 2012
- Recorded: 2012
- Genre: K-pop
- Language: Korean
- Label: WM Entertainment

B1A4 chronology
1 (2012)	In the Wind (2012)	What's Happening? (2013)

Singles from In the Wind
- 1. "Tried to Walk" Released: November 12, 2012

In the Wind is the third mini-album played by the South Korean boy band B1A4 and was released by WM Entertainment on November 12, 2012. The track "Tried to Walk" was used as the lead single of the EP.

== Track listing ==
No.	Title	Lyrics	Music	Length
1.	"In the Wind" (Intro)		Jinyoung, Joh Eun-nom	1:00
2.	"Tried to Walk" (걸어 본다; Georeo Bonda)	Jinyoung, Baro	Jinyoung	3:36
3.	"If…" (너만 있으면; Neoman Isseumyeon, As Long as There's You)	우리형과 내동생, Baro	우리형과 내동생, Ichiro Suezawa	3:22
4.	"I Won't Do Bad Things" (나쁜 짓안 할게요; Nappeun Jisan Halgeyo) (Narration by Suzy of miss A)	우리형과 내동생	우리형과 내동생	3:29
5.	"What Do You Want to Do" (뭐 할래요; Mwo Hallaeyo)	Jinyoung, Baro	Jinyoung	3:31
6.	"Be My Girl" (Jinyoung solo - feat. JeA of Brown Eyed Girls)	JeA, Lee Kyu-hyun	JeA, Lee Kyu-hyun	3:32
7.	"In the Air"	Swin AKA 수인, Ryan S. Jhun, Jinyoung, Baro	Ryan S. Jhun, JD Relic	3:30
8.	"Tried to Walk" (Instrumental)		Jinyoung	3:36
Total length:				25:35

== Charts ==
=== Weekly chart ===
Chart (2012)	Peak position
South Korean Albums (Gaon Album Chart)	1

=== Monthly chart ===
Chart (2012)	Peak position
South Korean Albums (Gaon Album Chart)	3
