= Find the 1st Prize =

- Drama Stage episode
- Official poster
- Episode no.: Season 5 Episode 5
- Directed by: Park Hong-su
- Written by: Choi Si-eun
- Original air date: June 17, 2022
- Hangul: 1등 당첨금 찾아가세요
- RR: 1deung dangcheomgeum chajagaseyo
- MR: 1tŭng tangch'ŏmgŭm ch'ajagaseyo

Episode chronology
← Previous "XX+XY"	Next → "Don't Announce Your Husband's Death"

"Find the 1st Prize" (Korean: 1등 당첨금 찾아가세요; RR: 1deung dangcheomgeum chajagaseyo) is the fifth episode of the fifth season of the South Korean anthology series Drama Stage, produced by Studio Dragon and C-JeS Entertainment for tvN. Directed by Park Hong-su and starring Kim Do-yoon, Ryu Hyun-kyung and Shin Dong-woo, this comedy is about a man, who escapes self-quarantined for COVID-19 to grab the biggest fortune of his life as he learns he has won the lottery with less than a day left before deadline of the payout. The episode was aired on tvN on June 17, 2022, at 12:10 (KST).

== Synopsis ==
Kim Do-yoon seeking job as an aircraft pilot received a notice of indefinite postponement from the company ahead of the final interview. He is self-isolated due to COVID-19. As he learns that he won the first prize in the lottery with less than a day left until the deadline for payment, he runs away to catch the greatest luck of his life. (As per official website)

== Cast ==
- Kim Do-yoon as Jeong Jae-hoon

36 years old, with his wife Mi-ran's support, at a late age, he prepared for a job as an aircraft pilot but received a notice of indefinite postponement from the company ahead of the final interview.

- Ryu Hyun-kyung as Kang Mi-ran

36 years old, Jeong Jae-hoon's wife, she majored in judo at university, after failing to be selected for the national team, she gave up sports.

- Lee Seo-hwan as Wang Jang-gyu

33 years old, a strict loan shark who is sensitive to the interest payment date.

- CNU as Kim Hyeon-woo

31 years old, after 5 years of exam life, he passed the civil service examination.

== Original soundtrack ==
Find the 1st Prize

Soundtrack album by CNU
- Released: 2022
- Genre: Soundtrack
- Languages: Korean; English
- Labels: Genie Music; Stone Music Entertainment

Released on June 18, 2022
No.	Title	Lyrics	Music	Artist	Length
1.	"Heigh-ho"	Aden K., Dennis Chang, KEHN	Aden K., Dennis Chang, KEHN	CNU (B1A4)	2:29
2.	"Heigh-ho" (inst.)				2:29

== Ratings ==
Average TV viewership ratings
Original broadcast date	Average audience share (Nielsen Korea)
Original broadcast date	Nationwide
June 17, 2022	0.4%
