= Police University (TV series) =

2021 South Korean television youth drama

- Promotional poster
- Also known as: Police Academy
- Hangul: 경찰수업
- Hanja: 警察授業
- Lit.: Police Class
- RR: Gyeongchalsueop
- MR: Kyŏngch'alsuŏp
- Genre: Crime; Comedy; Police procedural
- Created by: Ki Min-soo; KBS Drama Division
- Written by: Min Jung
- Directed by: Yoo Kwan-mo
- Starring: Cha Tae-hyun; Jung Jin-young; Krystal Jung
- Music by: Gaemi
- Country of origin: South Korea
- Original language: Korean
- No. of episodes: 16

Production
- Executive producer: Lee Yoon-jin (KBS)
- Producers: Lee Jang-soo; Jang Se-jeong; Lee Min-soo; Park Jin-hang
- Camera setup: Single-camera
- Running time: 70 minutes
- Production company: Logos Film

Original release
- Network: KBS2
- Release: August 9 – October 5, 2021

Police University (Korean: 경찰수업; RR: Gyeongchalsueop) is a 2021 South Korean television series directed by Yoo Kwan-mo and starring Cha Tae-hyun, Jung Jin-young and Krystal Jung. The series revolves around a police university professor with 20 years' experience in crime detection and a computer hacker, who joins the university as a first-year student. It premiered on KBS2 on August 9, 2021, and aired every Monday and Tuesday at 21:30 (KST) till October 5.

== Synopsis ==
The story follows the life of various recruits and instructors in the National Police University.

Yoo Dong-man (Cha Tae-hyun) is a detective with 20 years of experience in criminal homicide and cyber investigation who has been sent to the Police University as a professor to be an instructor in detective work after a botched investigation. Dong-man often chats and gains hacking tools and information through the dark web with the moniker "Bird" with Kang Seon-ho (Jung Jin-young), a hacker with the alias "Yoon". While following a lead on a case of a cryptocurrency illegal gambling site which caused the death of his fiancée, both Seon-ho and Dong-man cross paths unwittingly which leads to bad blood.

Having no dream about his future, Seon-ho chances upon Oh Kang-hee, Krystal Jung (who dreams of being a police officer) and falls in love with her at first sight. Following her footsteps, he too enrolls at the police university where he meets Yoo Dong-man again. Together, the three of them form a team for a joint investigation against the corruption happening in the school.

The series also shows conflict and harmony between professors and students within the school and corruption between criminals and the police force.

== Cast ==
=== Main ===
- Cha Tae-hyun as Yoo Dong-man

A detective-turned-professor at the National Police University having 20 years of experience in each department from homicide detective to a cyber investigation

- Jung Jin-young as Kang Seon-ho

A freshman at the National Police University, a former hacking criminal

- Krystal Jung as Oh Kang-hee

A freshman at the National Police University. She has been running tirelessly to achieve her dream of becoming a police officer.

=== Supporting ===
==== Police University academic staff ====
- Hong Soo-hyun as Choi Hee-soo

Professor of Judo Department

- Lee Jong-hyuk as Kwon Hyuk-pil

Law professor

- Seo Ye-hwa as Baek-hee

The director of the National Police University's Guidance Department

- Kang Shin-il as Seo Sang-hak

In the 50s, professor of the Public Administration and in charge of the Scientific Investigation Research Society.

- Shin Seung-hwan as owner of 'Gossi Beer'

40 years old, the owner of 'Gossi Beer' near Police University and known as 'high school professor' to the students.

==== Police University freshmen ====
- Choo Young-woo as Park Min-kyu

20 years old, he was born into a family of lawyers and had been in the elite level courses. His life, which is unshakable everywhere and at all times. They start to split up after meeting Kang Seon-ho, who has opposite tendencies.

- Lee Dal as Roh Beom-tae

22 years old, 1st year freshman, Kang Seon-ho's roommate

- Yoo Young-jae as Jo Joon-wook

20 years old, 1st year freshman

- Park Seun-yeon as Min Jae-kyung

21 years old, 1st year freshman, Kang Hee's roommate

- Lee Do-hoon as Cha Seong-soo

20 years old, 1st year freshman, Mingyu's roommate

- Ha-Jun Jung as Park Don-ggu

20 years old, 1st year freshman

- Min Chae-eun as Ahn Hae-ju

20 years old, 1st year freshman

- Ain as Jo Sung-eun

20 years old, 1st year freshman

==== Police University seniors ====
- Kim Jong-Hoon as Han Min-guk

22 years old, 3rd year student and president of Student Council

- Kim Jae-in as Yoon Na-rae

22 years old, 3rd year student and member of Judo Club

- Byeon Seo-yun as Eonju Lee

21 years old, 2nd year student and member of PR team

- Kim Tae-hoon as Kang Myung-jung

21 years old, 2nd year student and member of Student Council

- Yoo Hyun-jong as Byeon Tae-jin

22 years old, 2nd year student and member of Student Council

==== People outside Police University ====
- Song Jin-woo as Park Chul-jin

Inspector at Seoul District Office Detective Team 1

- Yoon Jin-ho as Team leader Choi

Team leader of Seoul District Office Detective Team 1

- Choi Seo-won Joo Kyeong-jang

Youngest member of the Seoul District Office Detective Team 1

- Yoo Tae-woong as Head of department

investigation manager of Seoul Regional Office

==== Kang-hee's family ====
- Kim Young-sun as Oh Jeong-ja

40 years old, mother of Oh Kang-hee

==== Others ====
- Oh Man-seok as Yoon Taek-il

50s, owner of Yoon Jeon-pasa. Father of Seung-beom and guardian (adoptive father) of Seon-ho

- Choi Woo-sung as Yoon Seung-beom

20 years old, friend of Kang Seon-ho

- Lee Seong-woo as Jang Pro

=== Special appearance ===
- Song Young-jae as longtime acquaintance of Kang Seon-ho
- Kim Kwang-kyu as Kang Seon-ho's homeroom teacher. (Ep.1)
- Hwang Seung-eon as Kim Eun-joo, Dong-man's fiancée who died in a car accident while investigating an illegal gambling site.

== Production ==
=== Casting ===
There was news on December 30, 2020, that Cha Tae-hyun received an offer for the drama titled then as Police Academy. On February 16, 2021, Jung Jin-young was reportedly considering the offer following the end of his military service in April. On March 3, 2021, Krystal Jung's casting in Police Academy was confirmed. On March 18, 2021, Yoo Young-jae's agency, J-World, confirmed his appearance in the TV series. There were reports on April 6 and 17 of Hong Soo-hyun and Seo Ye-hwa being cast in the series titled then as My Little Police. In late April to early May, the leading cast was confirmed for the final title Police University. On June 16, scenes of first script reading from site were released.

=== Filming ===
On June 12, 2021, the filming schedule of drama was planned in Cheongju, Cheongju, Cheongwon. On June 22, it was reported that an outsourced staff was tested positive for COVID-19 on the 19th. Cast members and other staff were also tested, and all of them were negative of the contagion. The production team temporarily stopped filming as a precaution, in accordance with the guidelines of health authorities. The final filming took place on September 26, a week before the finale. Filming lasted for around six months.

== Release ==
Police University was simultaneously premiered on KBS2 and streaming media WAAVE on August 9, 2021, at 21:30 (KST). It is available for streaming on WAAVE.

== Original soundtrack ==
Police University

Soundtrack album by Various artists
- Released: 2021
- Genre: Soundtrack
- Languages: Korean; English
- Labels: Kakao Entertainment; Flex M
- Producer: Choi Gap-won (exec.)

=== Part 1 ===
Released on August 9, 2021
No.	Title	Lyrics	Music	Artist	Length
1.	"Winners" (한승윤)	Choi Gab-won; Good Choice	Zaydro; STARBUCK; JUNE	Han Seung-yoon	2:54
2.	"Winners" (Inst.)		Zaydro; STARBUCK; JUNE		2:54

=== Part 2 ===
Released on August 16, 2021
No.	Title	Lyrics	Music	Artist	Length
1.	"You Come Down Like a Star" (별처럼 니가 내려와)	Choi Gab-won; Good Choice	Noheul	Monday (Weeekly)	3:42
2.	"You Come Down Like a Star" (Inst.)		Noheul		3:42

=== Part 3 ===
Released on August 17, 2021
No.	Title	Lyrics	Music	Artist	Length
1.	"Get Ready"	Choi Gab-won; Good Choice	Aaron Kim; Isaac Han; D'tour; Walter Pok	D'tour	3:17
2.	"Get Ready" (Inst.)		Aaron Kim; Isaac Han; D'tour; Walter Pok		3:17

=== Part 4 ===
Released on August 23, 2021
No.	Title	Lyrics	Music	Artist	Length
1.	"Love Your Everything" (다 좋으니까)	Choi Gab-won; Good Choice	Gaemi	Lim Han-byul	3:53
2.	"Love Your Everything" (Inst.)		Gaemi		3:53

=== Part 5 ===
Released on August 30, 2021
No.	Title	Lyrics	Music	Artist	Length
1.	"Stay (Prod. by Jinyoung)" (남아있어 (Prod. by 진영))	Jinyoung	Jinyoung; Kang Myung-shin	Yuju (GFriend)	3:50
2.	"Stay (Prod. by Jinyoung)" (Inst.)		Jinyoung; Kang Myung-shin		3:50

=== Part 6 ===
Released on August 31, 2021
No.	Title	Lyrics	Music	Artist	Length
1.	"What I Want to Say to You" (너에게 하고 싶은 말)	Choi Gab-won; Good Choice	Gaemi; Lee Jun-hwa	Jung Dong-ha	3:23
2.	"What I Want to Say to You" (Inst.)		Gaemi; Lee Jun-hwa		3:23

=== Part 7 ===
Released on September 7, 2021
No.	Title	Lyrics	Music	Artist	Length
1.	"Another Me" (또 다른 나)	Choi Gab-won; Good Choice	Lee Seong-jin; Huh Seong-jin	Big Mama	3:50
2.	"Another Me" (Inst.)		Lee Seong-jin; Huh Seong-jin		3:50

== Viewership ==
Police University : South Korea viewers per episode (millions)

Season	Episode number																Average
Season	1	2	3	4	5	6	7	8	9	10	11	12	13	14	15	16	Average
1	0.973	1.360	1.254	1.571	1.255	1.525	1.269	1.286	1.145	1.291	1.060	1.255	1.101	1.081	1.085	1.151	1.229

Source: Audience measurement performed nationwide by Nielsen Korea.

Ep.	Original broadcast date	Average audience share		
Ep.	Original broadcast date	Nielsen Korea		TNmS
Ep.	Original broadcast date	Nationwide	Seoul	Nationwide
1	August 9, 2021	5.2% (18th)	5.2% (16th)	—N/a
2	August 10, 2021	6.5% (11th)	6.3% (8th)	—N/a
3	August 16, 2021	6.8% (12th)	7.2% (10th)	6.4% (12th)
4	August 17, 2021	8.5% (6th)	8.4% (4th)	7.5% (9th)
5	August 23, 2021	6.9% (11th)	6.9% (12th)	6.3% (16th)
6	August 24, 2021	8.3% (5th)	8.3% (4th)	8.3% (7th)
7	August 30, 2021	6.7% (9th)	6.3% (9th)	5.5% (14th)
8	August 31, 2021	7.1% (10th)	7.0% (9th)	7.0% (12th)
9	September 6, 2021	6.1% (13th)	6.3% (9th)	5.6% (16th)
10	September 7, 2021	6.9% (11th)	7.0% (9th)	6.3% (12th)
11	September 13, 2021	5.5% (14th)	5.3% (15th)	5.5% (15th)
12	September 14, 2021	6.5% (11th)	6.6% (7th)	5.6% (13th)
13†	September 27, 2021	5.4% (16th)	5.0% (19th)	5.3% (16th)
14†	September 28, 2021	6.0% (11th)	6.2% (7th)	5.8% (13th)
15	October 4, 2021	5.5% (15th)	5.2% (16th)	5.8% (15th)
16	October 5, 2021	6.3% (11th)	6.4% (8th)	5.5% (14th)
Average		6.5%	6.5%	6.2%
In this table, the blue numbers represent the lowest ratings and the red numbers represent the highest ratings.; N/A denotes that the rating is not known.; † Episodes 13 and 14 did not air on September 20 and September 21, respective, due to Chuseok holidays.

== Awards and nominations ==
Year	Award	Category	Recipient	Result	Ref.
2021	KBS Drama Awards	Top Excellence Award, Actor	Cha Tae-hyun	Won	
2021	KBS Drama Awards	Excellence Award, Actor in a Miniseries	Cha Tae-hyun	Nominated	
2021	KBS Drama Awards	Excellence Award, Actor in a Miniseries	Jung Jin-young	Nominated	
2021	KBS Drama Awards	Best Supporting Actress	Hong Soo-hyun	Nominated	
2021	KBS Drama Awards	Best New Actor	Choo Young-woo	Nominated	
2021	KBS Drama Awards	Best New Actress	Krystal Jung	Won	
2021	KBS Drama Awards	Popularity Award, Actor	Jung Jin-young	Won	
2021	KBS Drama Awards	Best Couple Award	Cha Tae-hyun with Jung Jin-young	Won	
