= The Dude in Me =

The Dude In Me
- Theatrical release poster
- Hangul: 내안의 그놈
- RR: Naeanui geunom
- MR: Naeanŭi kŭnom
- Directed by: Kang Hyo-jin
- Written by: Shin Han-sol; Jo Joong-hoon; Kang Hyo-jin
- Produced by: Kim Dong-joon; Lee Seo-yeol; Lee Seung-hyo
- Starring: Jung Jin-young; Park Sung-woong; Ra Mi-ran
- Distributed by: The Contents On; Merry Christmas
- Release date: January 9, 2019
- Running time: 122 minutes
- Country: South Korea
- Language: Korean
- Box office: US$14.7 million

The Dude In Me (Korean: 내안의 그놈; RR: Naeanui geunom) is a 2019 South Korean fantasy comedy film directed by Kang Hyo-jin, starring Jung Jin-young, Park Sung-woong and Ra Mi-ran. The film was released on January 9, 2019.

== Plot ==
Jang Pan-soo is a well-known elite gangster and is married to his boss' daughter. One day, a high school student, Dong-Hyun, falls off the roof by trying to retrieve a shoe and falls on Pan-Soo. Pan-Soo woke up in a hospital and felt something was wrong since everyone called him 'student', and Dong-Hyun's father ran up to him calling him Dong-Hyun and embracing him. Confused he ran to the nearest mirror and realized that he is now inside Dong-Hyun's body. After failing several times to go back to his own body, which is still unconscious in the hospital, he accepts his fate and goes home with Dong-Hyun's father.

As time passes by, he realizes that Dong-Hyun is targeted by bullies at school, is overweight, and has really bad eyesight. One by one, he starts fighting back against the bullies until they stop harassing him and Dong-Hyun's friend. During this time, one of his loyal subordinate, Man Chul, is guarding his unconscious body at the hospital and Pan-Soo convinces him that he switched bodies with a high school student and helps Pan-Soo gather intel and daily activities in the gang.

One day, Pan-Soo encounters Oh Hyun-Jung, a girl in his class who is also being targeted by bullies at school. He follows her home only to find out that her mom, Oh Mi-Sun, was his old ex-girlfriend. He has Man-Chul get a paternity test for him and finds out that Hyun-Jung is his daughter. Seeing how she is an easy target for bullies at school, he gets her to train with him under Man-Chul's supervision. After a few weeks, Pan-Soo loses all of his body fat, gaining back his fit body and Hyun-Jung learns how to defend herself from her bullies. Hyun-Jung starts to have feelings for Dong-Hyun, not knowing that it's actually her father inside his body.

During this time, Pan-Soo's rival, Boss Yang, conspires to frame Pan-Soo for embezzling money by using his wife to convince their boss, which is her own father. Pan-Soo finds this out from Man-Chul and writes a letter explaining the scandal to his boss. He later reveals to Mi-Sun that he is actually Pan-Soo, not Dong-Hyun, and she gets upset as she still has ill-feelings towards him for leaving her. Hyun-Jung stumbles upon them during this time and Pan-Soo expresses that he still loves her mother. This upsets Hyun-Jung, not knowing that it's actually her father saying this.

Dong-Hyun later wakes up in Pan-Soo's body and ends up at his home, shocked to see Pan-Soo there in his body. Later, Boss Yang visits Mi-Sun's restaurant and fights with Pan-Soo until Mi-Sun threatens everyone if they don't stop. Pan-Soo's wife visits her father and he reveals to her he knows that she is working with Boss Yang and has turned her back on her own family. He calls for Pan-Soo to clear things up with him. Pan-Soo sends Dong-Hyun to meet his boss, telling him what to say through an earpiece. His boss unexpectedly announces that Pan-Soo will take over the business, much to his wife's dismay, and accuses Pan-Soo of infidelity and having a daughter from it. Dong-Hyun convinces Pan-Soo's boss that family is important and he is willing to leave the business and inheritance for them.

The boss blesses Pan-Soo to leave the business and Pan-Soo embraces Dong-Hyun for being a better man than he is but is suddenly run over by his estranged wife. At the hospital, Pan-Soo faints at the hospital as well as Dong-Hyun. Six months later, Dong-Hyun goes back to school back in his own body and is surprised to see his classmates cheering him for kicking out the bullies, and seems that Hyun-Jung is going out with Dong-Hyun. They later go to Mi-Sun's new restaurant where Pan-Soo is working there as well as Man-Chul and people are rushing into their new restaurant.

== Cast ==
=== Main ===
- Jung Jin-young as Kim Dong-hyun, a bullied, introverted high school student
- Park Sung-woong as Jang Pan-soo, a charismatic leader and former gangster of a gang-turned-conglomerate
- Ra Mi-ran as Oh Mi-Sun, Pan-soo's first love

=== Supporting ===
- Lee Jun-hyeok as Man Chul, the trustworthy subordinate of Pan-soo
- Lee Soo-min as Oh Hyun-jung, Mi-sun's and Pan-soo's daughter
- Kim Kwang-kyu as Kim Jong-ki
- Kim Hyun-mok as Kim Jae-ik
- Yoon Kyung-ho as Boss Yang, Jang Pan-soo's rival
- Yoon Song-a as Homeroom teacher
- Park Kyung-hye as Jae-hee
- Park Ju-hyun as Female student #1

== Release ==
A press conference for the film was held on December 26, 2018. The film was released to the local cinemas on January 9, 2019.

The film is set to be released internationally in the Japan, Taiwan, Indonesia and Vietnam.

== Reception ==
=== Box office ===
In the first weekend of its release, The Dude In Me ranked second at the South Korean box office and sold 564,568 tickets at 1,041 screens. During the first five days since the release the film has sold a total of 770,000 tickets.

On the eighth day since the release movie surpassed 1 million ticket sales. At the end of 12 days since the movie premier, The Dude In Me had attracted a total of 1.6 million viewers passing the break-even point of 1.5 million.
