= Sweet Girl (EP) =

EP by B1A4
- Released: August 10, 2015
- Recorded: 2015
- Genre: K-pop, dance-pop
- Language: Korean
- Label: WM Entertainment; LOEN Entertainment (Note: Sweet Girl was the first-ever B1A4 release distributed by LOEN Entertainment after the group's agency, WM Entertainment, switched its distribution to the former from Pony Canyon Korea in April 2015. The first LOEN-distributed release from WM was Oh My Girl's self-titled debut EP, released on April 20, 2015.)

B1A4 chronology
Solo Day (2014)	Sweet Girl (2015)	Good Timing (2016)

Singles from Sweet Girl
- 1. "Sweet Girl" Released: August 10, 2015

Sweet Girl is the sixth "mini-album" EP released by South Korean boy group B1A4 under WM Entertainment. The album was released on August 10, 2015 by WM Entertainment and distributed by LOEN Entertainment. The title song of the album, "Sweet Girl", along with the other songs, was produced by leader Jinyoung. CNU also produced one song in the album called "Love is Magic". B1A4 won a trophy with "Sweet Girl" on the August 19 episode of MBC Every1 Show Champion and earned the title of the tenth most watched Korean music video in America for August by Billboard.

== Teasers ==
B1A4 posted five red-tinted images on Facebook and Twitter of the individual members showing off a new mature B1A4. On July 31, 2015, B1A4 posted a teaser video of all five songs on the album and a music video teaser on August 4, 2015. On August 6, they held a Guerilla Concert which was broadcast live via Naver's V app where they debuted three songs from their new album including "Sweet Girl". The official music video for "Sweet Girl" was released August 10, 2015 alongside their album.

== Track listing ==
No.	Title	Lyrics	Music	Arrangement	Length
1.	"Sweet Girl"	Jinyoung, Baro	Jinyoung, ZigZag Note	Jinyoung, ZigZag Note	4:09
2.	"You Are a Girl I Am a Boy"	Jinyoung, Baro	Jinyoung	Jinyoung, 문정규 (a.k.a. 좋은놈)	3:34
3.	"After 10 Years" (10년 후)	Jinyoung, Baro	Jinyoung	Jinyoung, ZigZag Note	3:28
4.	"Wait"	Jinyoung, Baro	Jinyoung, ZigZag Note	Jinyoung, ZigZag Note	4:23
5.	"Love Is Magic"	CNU, Baro	CNU, ZigZag Note	ZigZag Note	4:01
6.	"Let's Be Happy" (행복하자; hidden track)	CNU, Baro	CNU, Choi Myeong Hwan	Choi Myeong Hwan, Kim Ju Hye	3:10
Total length:					19:44

== Charts ==
Chart (2017)	Peak position
South Korean Albums (Gaon)	2
