= What's Happening? (EP) =

EP by B1A4
- Released: May 6, 2013
- Recorded: 2013
- Genre: K-pop, dance-pop
- Language: Korean
- Label: WM Entertainment

B1A4 chronology
In The Wind (2012)	What's Happening? (2013)	Who Am I (2014)

Singles from What's Happening?
- 1. "What's Happening?" Released: May 6, 2013; 2. "Starlight Song" Released: June 17, 2013

What's Happening? is the fourth mini-album recorded by the South Korean boy band B1A4, which was released by WM Entertainment on May 6, 2013. The track "What's Happening?" (also known as "What's Going On?") was used as the lead single of the album. The song "What's Happening(이게 무슨 일이야) took the first rank on the ground wave in Korea, May, 2013. What's Happening is one of the songs included on the setlist of the controversial Kuala Lumpur fanmeeting in January 2015.

== Track listing ==
No.	Title	Lyrics	Music	Length
1.	"Starlight Song" (별빛의 노래; Byeolbichui Norae)	Baro, 우리형과 내동생	우리형과 내동생	3:37
2.	"What's Happening?" (이게무슨일이야; Igemuseuniriya)	Baro, Jinyoung	Jinyoung	3:20
3.	"Yesterday"	Baro, Seo Yongbae, Lee Ki	Seo Yongbae, Lee Ki	3:35
4.	"Good Love"	Baro, Jinyoung, CNU	Jinyoung	3:56
5.	"How Many Times" (몇 번을; Myeot Beoneul)	Baro, 우리형과 내동생	우리형과 내동생, Ichiro Suezawa	3:38
Total length:				17:26

== Chart ==
Chart (2013)	Peak position
Gaon Album Chart	1
