= Beautiful Target =

2011 single by B1A4

Single by B1A4

from the album It B1A4
- Released: September 16, 2011
- Recorded: 2011
- Genre: K-pop, dance-pop
- Length: 3:18
- Label: WM Entertainment
- Songwriters: CNU, Baro, 우리형과 내동생, Shoko Fujibayashi (Japanese lyrics)

Korean singles chronology
"Only Learned Bad Things" (2011)	"Beautiful Target" (2011)	"My Love" (2011)

"Beautiful Target" is a song released by the South Korean boy band B1A4. The song is the lead single from the group's second mini album It B1A4, released on September 16, 2011. The song was re-recorded in Japanese and used as the group's debut single in Japan, released on June 27, 2012.

== Composition ==
The song was composed by the members CNU and Baro and composed by 우리형과 내동생. In the mini album It B1A4, the song is listed as the track 1.

== Promotions ==
The group started promoting the song on September 16, 2011, on KBS' Music Bank. It was also promoted on the shows Show! Music Core, Inkigayo, M! Countdown and MTV The Show. The promotions of the song ended in November 2011 on SBS' Inkigayo and followed by the song "My Love". The song "Chu Chu Chu", from It B1A4, was used as an intro for the comeback week performances.

== Music video ==
A teaser of the music video was released on September 9, 2011. The full video was released one week after, on September 16, 2011, along with the EP digital release. Another version of the music video, called "Zoom Zoom" version, was released on October 7, 2011.

== Chart performance ==
The song debuted at the position number 86 in Gaon's Weekly singles chart, on the week of September 25, with 4,030,414 points. On the following week the song climbed nineteen positions and charted at number 67, which is the current peak of the song.

=== Charts ===
Chart (2011)	Peak position
Gaon Weekly singles	67
Gaon Monthly singles	113

== Japanese version ==
"Beautiful Target"
- Regular edition cover

Single by B1A4

from the album 1
- B-side: "Chu Chu Chu" (Japanese version)
- Released: June 27, 2012
- Recorded: 2011–2012
- Genre: J-pop, dance-pop
- Label: Pony Canyon
- Songwriters: CNU, Baro, Urihyeong-gwa Naedongsaeng, Shoko Fujibayashi (Japanese lyrics), Urihyeong-gwa Naedongsaeng

B1A4 Japanese singles chronology
"Beautiful Target" (2012)	"Oyasumi Good Night" (2012)

Almost one year after its original release, the group's agency, WM Entertainment announced that the song was re-recorded in Japanese and will be used as their debut single in Japan. The single was released on June 27, 2012, in three different editions: CD+DVD, CD+Goods and a Regular edition.

=== Composition ===
The song was translated in Japanese by Shoko Fujibayashi. The b-side "Chu Chu Chu" was originally written by Song Bong-jo and Song Jae-won and translated in Japanese by MEG.ME. The song "Bling Girl", included as a bonus track of the CD+Goods edition, was originally written by the members Jinyoung and Baro and translated in Japanese by MEG.ME. The song is originally in Korean and it was released on their debut EP Let's Fly. The song "Ready to Go", included as a bonus track of the Regular edition, is an original Japanese song written by Yuki Shirai.

=== Music video ===
The music video of the Japanese version of the song was released on June 3, 2012, in Pony Canyon's YouTube account. Although this version has different studios and looks, the music video follows the same concept of the Korean version.

=== Track listing ===
CD+DVD edition
No.	Title	Lyrics	Music	Length
1.	"Beautiful Target" (Japanese version)	CNU, Baro, Urihyeong-gwa Naedongsaeng, Shoko Fujibayashi (Japanese lyrics)	Urihyeong-gwa Naedongsaeng	3:22
2.	"Chu Chu Chu" (Japanese version)	Song Bong-jo, Song Jae-won, MEG.ME (Japanese lyrics)	Song Bong-jo	3:31
3.	"Beautiful Target" (Instrumental)		Urihyeong-gwa Naedongsaeng	3:21
4.	"Chu Chu Chu" (Instrumental)		Song Bong-jo	3:31
Total length:				13:45

DVD
No.	Title	Length
1.	"Beautiful Target" and "O.K" (Live from Japan Showcase 2011)
2.	"Jacket Making-of" (Off-shot movie)

CD+Goods edition
No.	Title	Lyrics	Music	Length
1.	"Beautiful Target" (Japanese version)	CNU, Baro, Urihyeong-gwa Naedongsaeng, Shoko Fujibayashi (Japanese lyrics)	Urihyeong-gwa Naedongsaeng	3:22
2.	"Chu Chu Chu" (Japanese version)	Song Bong-jo, Song Jae-won, MEG.ME (Japanese lyrics)	Song Bong-jo	3:31
3.	"Bling Girl" (Japanese version)	Jinyoung, Baro, MEG.ME (Japanese lyrics)	Jinyoung	3:38
4.	"Beautiful Target" (Instrumental)		Urihyeong-gwa Naedongsaeng	3:21
5.	"Chu Chu Chu" (Instrumental)		Song Bong-jo	3:31
6.	"Bling Girl" (Instrumental)		Jinyoung	3:35
Total length:				20:58

Regular edition
No.	Title	Lyrics	Music	Length
1.	"Beautiful Target" (Japanese version)	CNU, Baro, Urihyeong-gwa Naedongsaeng, Shoko Fujibayashi (Japanese lyrics)	Urihyeong-gwa Naedongsaeng	3:22
2.	"Chu Chu Chu" (Japanese version)	Song Bong-jo, Song Jae-won, MEG.ME (Japanese lyrics)	Song Bong-jo	3:31
3.	"Ready to Go"	Yuki Shirai	Damon Sharpe, Jimmy Burney, Charles "Chizzy" Stephens III	3:51
4.	"Beautiful Target" (Instrumental)		Urihyeong-gwa Naedongsaeng	3:21
5.	"Chu Chu Chu" (Instrumental)		Song Bong-jo	3:31
6.	"Ready to Go" (Instrumental)		Damon Sharpe, Jimmy Burney, Charles "Chizzy" Stephens III	3:49
Total length:				21:22

=== Charts ===
==== Oricon chart ====
Oricon Chart	Peak	Debut Sales	Sales Total	Chart Run
Daily Singles Chart	4	15,858 (Daily); 32,665 (Weekly; Monthly)	36,521+	7 weeks
Weekly Singles Chart	4	15,858 (Daily); 32,665 (Weekly; Monthly)	36,521+	7 weeks
Monthly Singles Chart	12	15,858 (Daily); 32,665 (Weekly; Monthly)	36,521+	7 weeks

==== Other charts ====
Chart	Peak position
Billboard Japan Hot 100	8

== Release history ==
Country	Date	Format	Label
South Korea	September 16, 2011	Promotional single	WM Entertainment
Japan	June 27, 2012	CD single, Digital download	Pony Canyon
