= Who Am I (B1A4 album) =

Studio album by B1A4
- Released: January 13, 2014
- Recorded: 2013
- Genre: K-pop, dance-pop
- Language: Korean
- Label: WM Entertainment

B1A4 chronology
What's Happening? (2013)	Who Am I (2014)	2 (2014)

Singles from Who Am I
- 1. "Lonely (없구나)" Released: January 13, 2014

Who Am I is the second full-length album released by B1A4 under WM Entertainment. The album was released on January 13, 2014, by WM Entertainment and their distributing label Pony Canyon Korea. The title song of the album, "Lonely (없구나), was produced by leader Jinyoung along with 7 other tracks in the album. CNU also took part in the composition with 2 self-produced songs.

== Release and promotion ==
On December 31, 2013, WM Entertainment released teaser photos for the B1A4's 2nd Album on their official website, including a group picture and an individual teaser picture for each member. On January 2, B1A4 released a music video teaser for Lonely (없구나). On January 6, B1A4 released a music video teaser drama version for Lonely (없구나). On January 9, B1A4 released a medley teaser previewing 15 seconds of each song.

== Track listing ==
No.	Title	Lyrics	Music	Arrangement	Length
1.	"Prologue" (Intro)		Jinyoung, Good Guy	Jinyoung, Good Guy	1:07
2.	"Lonely" (없구나; Eopguna)	Jinyoung, Baro	Jinyoung	Jinyoung, Perfume	4:05
3.	"Memory" (사랑 그땐; Sarang Geuttaen) (feat. Harim)	Jinyoung	Jinyoung	Jinyoung, Good Guy	3:40
4.	"Amazing"	CNU, Baro	Dennis White, Timothy James, Antonina Armato	Dennis White, Timothy James, Antonina Armato	3:55
5.	"Baby"	Jinyoung, Baro	Jinyoung	Jinyoung, Good Guy	3:56
6.	"Oh My God"	Park Kang Il, Baro	Park Kang Il	Park Shin Won	3:35
7.	"Too Much" (벅차; Beokcha) (Sandeul + Gongchan)	Noh Joo Hwan, C-NO	Noh Joo Hwan, C-NO	Noh Joo Hwan, C-NO	4:06
8.	"Pretty" (예뻐; Yeppeo)	Jinyoung, Baro, CNU	Jinyoung	Jinyoung, Good Guy	3:18
9.	"Who Am I"	Jinyoung, Baro, Good Guy	Jinyoung, Good Guy	Jinyoung, Good Guy	3:14
10.	"Feel the Music" (음악에 취해; Eumage Chwihae) (CNU Solo)	CNU	CNU, Joo Young, Go Hyung Suk	Go Hyung Suk	3:52
11.	"Road" (길; Gil)	Baro, Lee Gi, Yong Bae	Lee Gi, Yong Bae	Lee Gi, Yong Bae	3:42
12.	"Seoul"	CNU, Baro	CNU	Go Hyung Suk	3:47
Total length:					42:11

== Chart ==
Chart (2014)	Peak position
Gaon Album Chart	1
