= It B1A4 =

EP by B1A4
- Released: September 22, 2011
- Recorded: 2011
- Genre: K-pop, Dance-pop
- Language: Korean
- Label: WM Entertainment

B1A4 chronology
Let's Fly (2011)	It B1A4 (2011)	Ignition (2012)

Singles from It B1A4
- 1. "Beautiful Target" Released: September 16, 2011; 2. "My Love" Released: November 18, 2011

It B1A4 is the second mini-album released by B1A4 and released by WM Entertainment released on September 16, 2011.

== Track listing ==
No.	Title	Lyrics	Music	Length
1.	"Beautiful Target"	우리형과 내동생, CNU, Baro	우리형과 내동생	3:18
2.	"My Love"	우리형과 내동생, Baro	Chance, 우리형과 내동생	3:16
3.	"쮸쮸쮸 (Chu Chu Chu)"	Song Bongjo, Song Jaewon	Song Bongjo, Meng Lee	3:27
4.	"Wonderful Tonight"	Jinyoung, CNU, Baro	Jinyoung	3:31
5.	"Fooool"	Park Gangil	Park Gangil	3:23
6.	"Beautiful Target" (Instrumental)		Lee Yonghwan, Kim Heewon, Ham Junseok	3:18

== Chart ==
Chart (2011)	Peak position
Gaon Album Chart	2
