= Ignition (B1A4 album) =

Studio album by B1A4
- Released: March 14, 2012
- Recorded: 2012
- Genres: K-pop, dance-pop
- Length: 39:07
- Language: Korean
- Label: WM Entertainment
- Producer: Lee Wonmin

B1A4 chronology
It B1A4 (2011)	Ignition (2012)	1 (2012)

Singles from Ignition
- 1. "This Time Is Over" Released: March 5, 2012; 2. "Baby I'm Sorry" Released: March 14, 2012

Special Edition

Singles from Ignition (Special Edition)
- 1. "Baby Good Night" Released: May 24, 2012

Ignition is the first full-length album by the South Korean boy band B1A4.The album was released on March 14, 2012, by WM Entertainment and their distributing label Pony Canyon Korea. The album spawned two singles: "This Time Is Over" and "Baby I'm Sorry" which is the title track written and composed by the group's leader Jinyoung. A special edition of the album was released on May 24, 2012.

Starting off with the release of their single "This Time Is Over", the group formally started promotions for their first studio album a day after.

== Background ==
After a successful entry into the Japanese market, the group finally started preparation for their upcoming comeback in Korea. Initially, rumors about the group releasing their 3rd mini album circulated around the internet to which the management immediately dismissed all rumors and added that the group's comeback is yet to be decided. Production of the full album was done less than 2 months under the production of the newly rising composing group "Our Hyung and My Dongsaeng " (kor: 우리형과 내동생; rom: uri hyung-gwa nae dongsaeng)led the production of the album with the members actively participating in composing and writing lyrics for the songs, the first studio album of B1A4 was then released on March 14, 2012.

== Release and promotion ==
Ahead of the release of their full album, WM Entertainment posted a notice on the group's official site that B1A4 would be releasing a song form their album entitled "This Time is Over" on March 5. The single was then leaked the morning of March 4 but the official release still pushed through and along with the release of the song, the first teaser photo featuring member BARO plus a teaser video was released. After the release of the first teaser photo, member Gongchan's photo was released the next then Jinyoung, CNU, and Sandeul in the span of 9 days with a 2-day interval each photo.

Promotions for the album officially began when the group had its first comeback stage at Mnet M Countdown on March 14. The group performed a total of 2 songs, namely their title track "Baby I'm Sorry" and their other single "This Time Is Over". Comeback stages for KBS Music Bank, MBC Show! Music Core, SBS Inkigayo followed after.

== Track listing ==
No.	Title	Lyrics	Music	Length
1.	"Baby I'm Sorry"	Jinyoung, Baro	Jinyoung	3:32
2.	"This Time Is Over"	우리형과 내동생, Baro	우리형과 내동생	3:20
3.	"So Fine"	우리형과 내동생, Baro	우리형과 내동생, Ichiro Suezawa	3:11
4.	"Super Sonic"	우리형과 내동생, Baro	우리형과 내동생	3:07
5.	"Just the Two of Us" (둘만 있으면; Dulman Isseumyeon) (Baro Solo ft. Miss A's Min)	우리형과 내동생, Baro	우리형과 내동생, Baro	3:39
6.	"Smile" (웃어봐; Useobwa)	Choi Sabweon	Lee Sangho, Choi Youngchan	4:00
7.	"Feeling"	Jinyoung, Baro	Jinyoung	3:31
8.	"Crush" (짝사랑; Jjaksarang) (Sandeul Solo)	Park Gangil	Park Gangil	3:49
9.	"You Are My Girl"	우리형과 내동생, Baro	우리형과 내동생	3:42
10.	"Wonderful Tonight" (Unplugged Remix)	Jinyoung, Baro, CNU	Jinyoung	3:51
11.	"Baby I'm Sorry" (Instrumental)		Jinyoung	3:32
Total length:				39:07

Special Edition track listing
No.	Title	Length
1.	"Baby Good Night" (잘자요 굿나잇; Jaljayo Gutnait)	3:20
2.	"Because of You" (너때문에; Neottaemune)	3:52
3.	"Baby I'm Sorry"	3:32
4.	"This Time is Over"	3:20
5.	"So Fine"	3:11
6.	"Super Sonic"	3:07
7.	"The Two of Us" (둘만 있으면; Dulman Isseumyeon) (feat. Miss A's Min)	3:39
8.	"Smile" (웃어봐; Useobwa)	4:00
9.	"Feeling"	3:31
10.	"Crush" (짝사랑; Jjaksarang)	3:49
11.	"You Are My Girl"	3:42
12.	"Wonderful Tonight" (Unplugged Remix)	3:51
13.	"Baby Good Night" (Instrumental)	3:21
14.	"Because of You" (Instrumental)	3:52
15.	"Baby I'm Sorry" (Instrumental)	3:32
Total length:		53:33

== Charts ==
=== Weekly charts ===
Chart	Peak Position	Ref
Japan Oricon Weekly Album Chart	46	
South Korea Gaon Weekly Albums Chart	2	
South Korea Hanteo Weekly Album Chart	2	

=== Monthly charts ===
Chart	Peak Position	Ref
South Korea Gaon Monthly Album Chart	4	

=== Single chart ===
Song	Peak chart position	
Song	KOR	KOR
Song	Gaon Chart	K-Pop Billboard
"This Time Is Over"	44	55
"Baby I'm Sorry"	19	18
"Baby Good Night"	13	14

==== Other songs charted ====
Song	Peak chart position	
Song	KOR	KOR
Song	Gaon Chart	K-Pop Billboard
"Just the Two of Us"	102	-
"So Fine"	116	-
"Crush"	117	93
"Smile"	128	-
"You Are My Girl"	139	-
"Feeling"	149	-
"Super Sonic"	152	-
"Wonderful Tonight (Unplugged Remix)"	174	-
"Because Of You"	105	64
