= Baby Good Night =

Single by B1A4

Single by B1A4

from the album Ignition (Special Edition)
- Released: May 24, 2012
- Recorded: 2012
- Genre: K-pop, dance-pop
- Length: 3:28
- Label: WM Entertainment
- Songwriters: Jinyoung; Baro
- Producer: Jinyoung

Korean singles chronology
"Baby I'm Sorry" (2012)	"Baby Good Night" (2012)	"Tried to Walk" (2012)

"Baby Good Night" (Korean: 잘자요 굿나잇; Japanese: おやすみ Good Night), also known as Sleep Well, Good Night, is the third and lead single from the repackaged edition of B1A4's album Ignition. A Japanese version of the song was released on August 29, 2012 as the group's second Japanese single.

== Composition ==
The song was written by the members Baro and Jinyoung, who also composed the song. In the special edition of the album Ignition, the song is listed as track 1. An instrumental version of the song was also included as track 13.

== Promotions ==
The TV promotions of the song started on May 25, 2012 on KBS Music Bank. It was also promoted on the shows Show! Music Core and Inkigayo. The promotions of the song and album ended on June 23, 2012, on MBC's Show! Music Core.

== Music video ==
The music video was released on May 24, 2012, along with the repackaged album digital release. The music video features ESteem model, Joo Sunyoung.

== Chart performance ==
The song debuted at number 23 in Gaon's Weekly singles chart in the week of September 27, 2012, with 11,776,275 points. On the following week the song climbed ten positions and charted at number 13, the current peak of the song. It dropped back to number 23 on the following week.

=== Charts ===
Chart (2011)	Peak position
Gaon Weekly singles	13
Gaon Weekly domestic singles	13
Gaon Monthly singles	25
Gaon Monthly domestic singles	23

== Japanese version ==
"Oyasumi Good Night" "おやすみ good night"
- Regular edition cover

Single by B1A4

from the album 1
- B-side: "Baby I'm Sorry" (Japanese version)
- Released: August 29, 2012
- Recorded: 2012
- Genre: J-pop, Dance-pop
- Label: Pony Canyon
- Songwriters: Jinyoung, Baro

B1A4 Japanese singles chronology
"Beautiful Target" (2012)	"Oyasumi Good Night" "おやすみ good night" (2012)	"'What's Happening? What - Why?'" (2013)

After promoting the song in South Korea, the Japanese version of the song was announced as the group's second Japanese single. It will be released on August 29, 2012 in 3 editions: CD+DVD, CD+Goods and a Regular edition.

=== Composition ===
The song was originally written by the members Jinyoung and Baro, and translated in Japanese by MEG.ME. The b-side "Baby I'm Sorry" and bonus track "So Fine" were originally recorded in Korean, released on the album Ignition. "Fly Away", bonus track of the Regular edition, is an original Japanese song.

=== Track listing ===
All music is composed by Jinyoung.

CD+DVD edition
No.	Title	Lyrics	Length
1.	"Oyasumi Good Night" (おやすみ good night; Sleep Well, Good Night) (Japanese version)	Jinyoung, Baro, Meg.Me (Japanese lyrics)
2.	"Baby I'm Sorry" (Japanese version)	Jinyoung, Baro, Tomonori Inoue (Japanese lyrics)
3.	"Oyasumi Good Night" (Instrumental)
4.	"Baby I'm Sorry" (Instrumental)

DVD
No.	Title	Length
1.	"Bling Girl" (BANA Japan special video) (BANA JAPAN結成式より)
2.	"Jacket Making-of" (Off-shot movie)

CD+Goods edition
No.	Title	Lyrics	Music	Length
1.	"Oyasumi Good Night" (おやすみ good night; Sleep Well, Good Night) (Japanese version)	Jinyoung, Baro, Meg.Me (Japanese lyrics)	Jinyoung
2.	"Baby I'm Sorry" (Japanese version)	Jinyoung, Baro, Tomonori Inoue (Japanese lyrics)	Jinyoung
3.	"So Fine" (Japanese version)	Urihyeong-gwa Naedongsaeng, Baro, Meg.Me (Japanese lyrics)	Urihyeong-gwa Naedongsaeng, Ichiro Suezawa
4.	"Oyasumi Good Night" (Instrumental)		Jinyoung
5.	"Baby I'm Sorry" (Instrumental)		Jinyoung
6.	"So Fine" (Instrumental)		Urihyeong-gwa Naedongsaeng, Ichiro Suezawa

Regular edition
No.	Title	Lyrics	Music	Length
1.	"Oyasumi Good Night" (おやすみ good night; Sleep Well, Good Night) (Japanese version)	Jinyoung, Baro, Meg.Me (Japanese lyrics)	Jinyoung
2.	"Baby I'm Sorry" (Japanese version)	Jinyoung, Baro, Tomonori Inoue (Japanese lyrics)	Jinyoung
3.	"Fly Away"	Meg.Me	Bruce
4.	"Oyasumi Good Night" (Instrumental)		Jinyoung
5.	"Baby I'm Sorry" (Instrumental)		Jinyoung
6.	"Fly Away" (Instrumental)		Bruce

=== Charts ===
==== Oricon ====
Oricon Chart	Peak	Debut Sales	Sales Total	Chart Run
Daily Singles Chart (1st day of release)	5	18,543	37,961	3 weeks
Daily Singles Chart (4th day of release)	3	4,196	37,961	3 weeks
Weekly Singles Chart	4	35,779	37,961	3 weeks
Monthly Singles Chart	21	35,779	37,961	3 weeks
Yearly Singles Chart	—	—	37,961	3 weeks

== Release history ==
Country	Date	Format	Label
South Korea	May 24, 2012	Promotional single	WM Entertainment
Japan	August 29, 2012	CD single, Digital download	Pony Canyon
