= B1A4 =

South Korean boy band

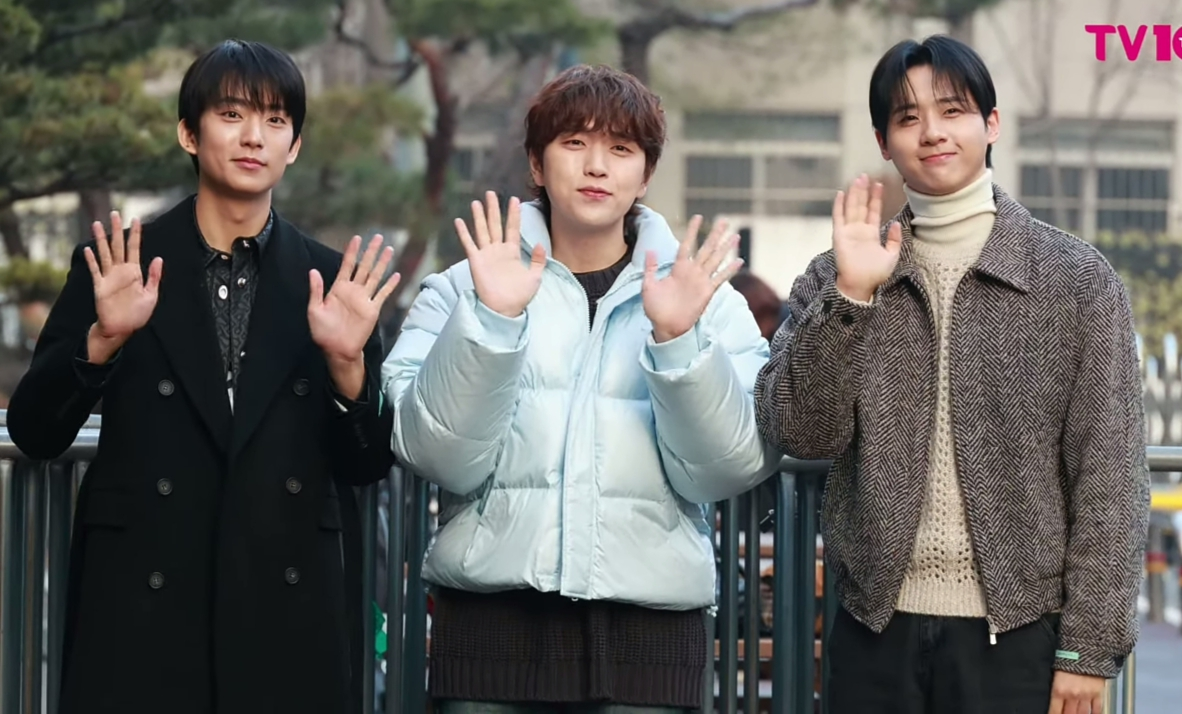
- B1A4 in January 2024; L–R: Gongchan, Sandeul, and CNU

Background information
- Origin: Seoul, South Korea
- Genre: K-pop
- Years active: 2011–present
- Labels: B1A4 Company; WM; Pony Canyon; Universal J (Japan)
- Members: CNU; Sandeul; Gongchan
- Past members: Jinyoung; Baro
- Website: b1a4.com

B1A4 (Korean: 비원에이포) is a South Korean boy band formed by WM Entertainment. The group debuted on April 23, 2011, with the single "O.K" from the EP Let's Fly, after being introduced to the public through a webtoon. They have released nine studio albums (four Korean and five Japanese) and seven EPs, as well as four compilation albums. The group had considerable commercial and critical success in both the Korean and Japanese markets. They have also toured in the United States.

== History ==
=== Pre-debut ===
Baro, the rapper of the group, was scouted by a company representative who came across his photo posted on his friend's homepage on the social network Cyworld. At his audition, Baro sang Sumi Jo's "Once I Leave" and Sung Si-kyung's "The Road to Me", as well as rapping and beatboxing. The group's leader Jinyoung was similarly discovered from a photo posted on Cyworld. He received training in composition, singing, and acting. Gongchan was also discovered on Cyworld as a result of his winning an "Ulzzang Challenge" when he was in middle school. Main vocalist Sandeul was approached by a company agent after performing a song by Kim Yeon-woo in a talent show. Prior to their debut, the group underwent a training period of two years.

=== 2011: Debut with Let's Fly and It B1A4 ===
On April 11, the members of B1A4 were introduced through a webtoon. Initially, it was believed that B1A4 would be a mixed gender group due to the presence of a female character named Anna in the webtoon. The same day, WM Entertainment revealed a photo of the first member of the group, leader Jinyoung. The remaining members Baro, Gongchan, Sandeul, and CNU were revealed on a daily basis between April 12–15. A music video teaser for B1A4's promotional single "O.K" was uploaded on April 19. The full music video, as well as their debut EP Let's Fly, was released on April 21. The group made their debut performance on the April 23 episode of MBC's Show! Music Core. They had their subsequent debut stages on Mnet's M Countdown, KBS' Music Bank, and SBS' Inkigayo on April 28, April 29, and May 1, respectively. B1A4 began promoting "Only Learned the Bad Things" on June 18, 2011. The group, alongside Block B, starred on SBS MTV's reality show Match Up. It began to air on June 22. The music video for the second promotional single "Only Learned the Bad Things" was aired on the first episode.

B1A4's second EP It B1A4 with the lead single "Beautiful Target" were released on September 15, 2011. The group promoted the EP on Music Bank, Show! Music Core, The Music Trend, and M! Countdown. B1A4 began promoting "My Love" on November 18.

In October 2011, it was announced that B1A4 would debut in Japan under the record label Pony Canyon in January 2012. Prior to their debut there, the group held their B1A4 – Japan Showcase Live 2011 at the Sinagawa Stellar Ball in Tokyo on December 9, 2011; the tickets for the event sold-out within one minute, an unprecedented feat for newly debuted groups. B1A4 performed nine songs at the event, which was attended by 1,000 people. At the end of the year, B1A4 won the Rookie of the Year Award at Tower Records' K-Pop Lovers! Awards 2011.

=== 2012: Debut in Japan and first concert ===
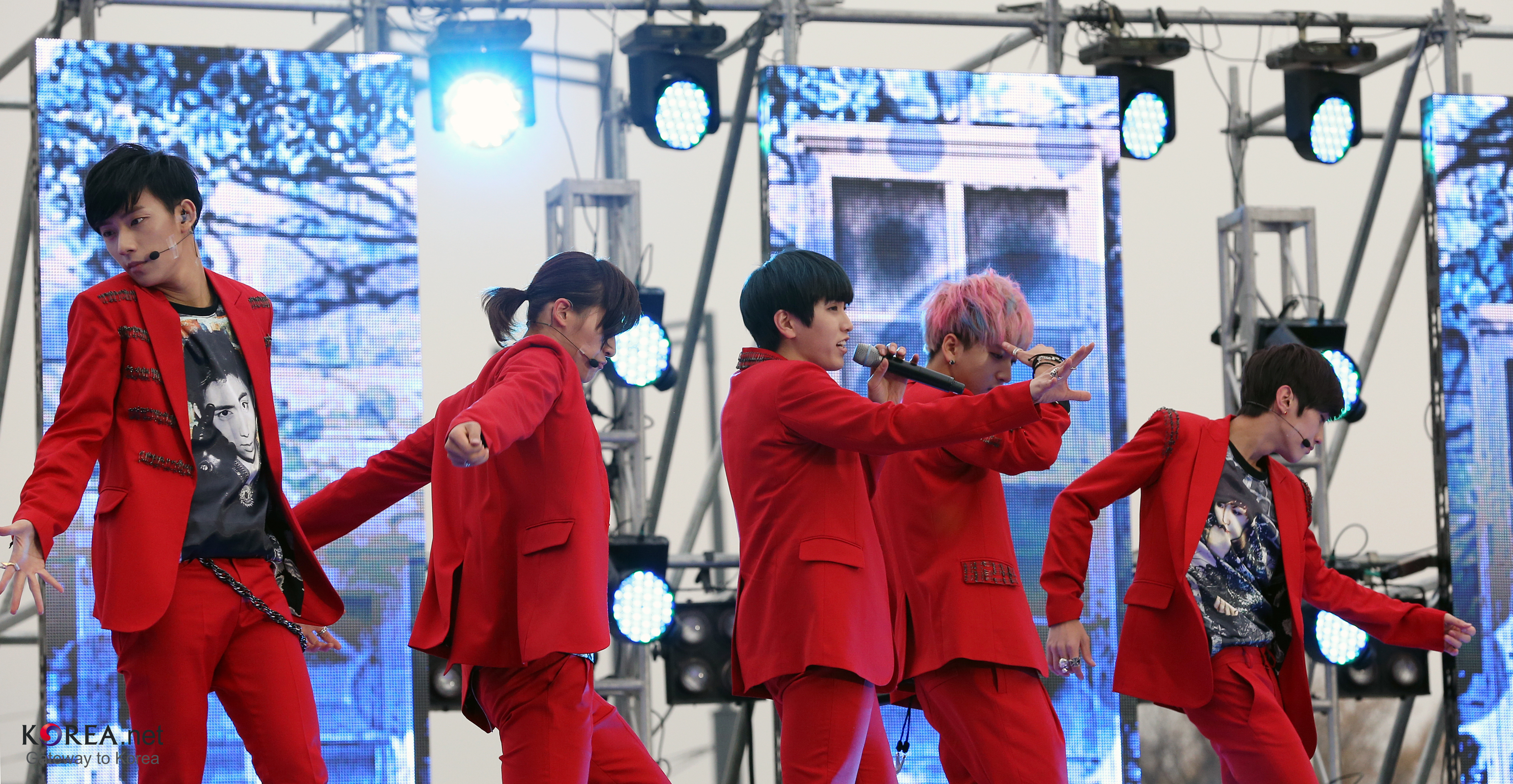
B1A4 performing live for SBS Inkigayo in 2012

Before entering the Japanese music industry, B1A4 released a compilation album on January 25, 2012, which consists of all the tracks previously included on Let's Fly and It B1A4 in Japan.

On March 5, B1A4 released the digital single "This Time Is Over" ahead of the release of their first studio album. B1A4 released Ignition and the promotional single "Baby I'm Sorry" on March 14, and they began promoting the song on M! Countdown the following the day, followed by performances on Music Bank, Show! Music Core, and The Music Trend. A repackaged edition of the album entitled Ignition: Special Edition, as well as the promotional single "Baby Good Night", was released on May 23.

B1A4 released their first Japanese-language single "Beautiful Target" on June 27, 2012. The song debuted at number four on the Oricon weekly singles chart, selling 32,665 in its first week. On July 25, B1A4 took part in season six of the reality show Hello Baby, where the group learns to care for children. On August 29, B1A4 released their second Japanese-language single "Oyasumi Good Night", which also debuted at number four on the Oricon weekly singles chart, selling 35,779 in its first week. They released their debut Japanese-language studio album 1 on October 24, 2012; it debuted at number five on the Oricon weekly albums chart, selling 20,547 in its first week.

Their third EP, In the Wind, was released on November 12, 2012; they began performing the promotional single "Tried to Walk" on M! Countdown on November 15, as well as on Music Bank, Show! Music Core, and The Music Trend the following days.

Tickets for B1A4's first solo concert, BABA B1A4, went on sale on October 18, 2012. The concert was co-produced by WM Entertainment and CJ E&M's global concert brand, M-Live. Before ticket sales began, 75,000 people were on the server waiting to buy the tickets resulting in 8,000 tickets to be sold out in 5 minutes once ticket sales opened. From December 8–9, 2012, B1A4 held their first solo concert BABA B1A4 at the SK Olympic Handball Gymnasium.

=== 2013–2014: Commercial success and world tour ===
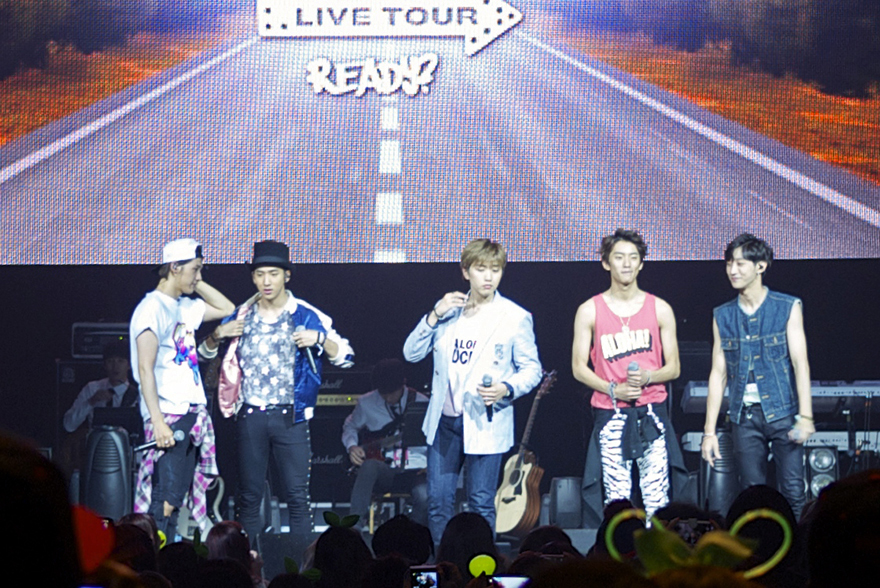
B1A4 performing at the Rosemont Theater for the Road Trip Tour in 2014

On January 7, 2013, the Recording Industry Association of Japan released the list of winners for the 2013 Japan Gold Disc Awards where the group won two awards. In the same month, BABA B1A4 in Japan was held in two cities, with four shows held between the 27th and the 30th.

Their fourth EP What's Happening? was released on May 6, 2013, which contains five-tracks including the title song "What's Happening". The music video of the title song was released on the next day. On May 18, B1A4 took their first music show win since debut with "What's Happening?" at MBCShow! Music Core.

On June 19, 2013, WM Entertainment announced B1A4's 2nd solo concert, Amazing Store. After tickets went on sale on June 26, the concert sold out its 10,000 seats in under 5 minutes. The concert took place from August 7–11 at the Uniqlo AX to an audience of 2,000 each day.

The group released their second Korean studio album Who Am I, containing twelve-tracks including the title song "Lonely" on January 13, 2014. They held their third solo concert 2014 B1A4 Concert The Class on February 15–16 at the SK Olympic Handball Stadium at Olympic Park.

B1A4 released their 5th EP with the same name of the title track "Solo Day" on July 14. The EP composed of six tracks including the title track with member Jinyoung, CNU and Baro participate in writing lyrics, composing and producing for the EP. It was announced that B1A4 would be appearing at 'The 12th Korea Times Music Festival' and KCON 2014 in Los Angeles, California. WM Entertainment announced that the group would held their first world tour 'Road Trip'. Their first concert took place in Taiwan on August 23, 2014, and Shanghai on August 30, 2014, then the boys headed on over to Manila on September 6, 2014, Melbourne on September 18, 2014, and Sydney on September 20, 2014. The boys also performed in New York on October 3, 2014, Chicago on October 5, 2014, Dallas on October 8, 2014, and San Francisco on October 11, 2014.

=== 2015–2018: world tour, Good Timing and Baro and Jinyoung's departure from WM ===
On August 10, 2015, B1A4 released their sixth EP Sweet Girl, which the lead single "Sweet Girl" and "You Are a Girl, I Am a Boy" firstly performance at Guerrilla Concert on August 6.

In July 2015, WM announced that the group's fifth concert tour, B1A4 Adventure 2015, would begin in Seoul on September 12 and 13, 2015. The concert also held in Dallas on November 8, Mexico on November 11, Puerto Rico on November 13, Hong Kong on November 29 and continue their Europe tour in Helsinki on December 9, Berlin on December 11, Madrid on December 13, Bogota on February 12, 2016, Santiago on February 14, and Lima on February 17, 2016.

On December 10, they released winter single "It's Christmas Time" for the first time since their debut.

On November 28, 2016, their third Korean studio album Good Timing was released, with 13 self composed tracks, including the lead single "A Lie". The group held their first comeback showcase since debut at Yes 24 Live Hall in Gwangjang-dong at 3 p.m. on the same day.

B1A4 held their sixth concert "B1A4 Live Space 2017" on February 4–5 and 11–12, 2017 at Seoul's Samsung Card Hall with a total 8,000. Shortly after, they held their second US tour titled "B1A4 Four Nights in The U.S. 2017", with concerts in New York on February 15; Chicago on February 17; San Francisco on February 19; and Los Angeles on February 20. In May 2017, CNU was cast to play the lead in the Korean version of the musical adaptation of Hamlet. The band toured Japan as "B1A4 Live Space 2017" with concerts in Osaka on May 22; Okazaki on June 8, Fukuoka on June 9, and Tokyo on June 15.

On September 25, 2017, B1A4 released their seventh EP Rollin'.

On June 30, 2018, WM Entertainment confirmed that Jinyoung and Baro had left the agency following the end of their contracts, while the others renewed with the agency. Their activities with the group remain in discussion. On November 16, WM Entertainment has announced that B1A4 members Jinyoung and Baro will not promote with the group for the time being, with the remaining three members – CNU, Sandeul and Gongchan – to continue promoting as B1A4.

=== 2019–2023: Military enlistments and Origine ===
On January 22, 2019, CNU enlisted in the military as an active duty soldier. He was officially discharged on August 28, 2020.

On September 29, 2020, WM Entertainment announced that B1A4 would be making a comeback with their fourth Korean studio album Origine and its lead single "Like A Movie" on October 19, 2020.

On April 23, 2021, B1A4 released the digital single "10 Times" to commemorate the group's 10th anniversary.

On November 11, 2021, Sandeul enlisted in the military as a social worker. Before his enlistment, B1A4 released a new digital single titled "Adore You" on November 10. On March 14, 2023, CNU was announced to have renewed his contract with WM Entertainment, while Gongchan was confirmed by WM to be exempted from serving in the military for health reasons. On August 10, 2023, Sandeul was discharged from military service as a social worker.

=== 2024–present: Post-military enlistment activities, Connect and new company ===
On January 8, 2024, B1A4 made a comeback with their 8th EP Connect and its lead single "Rewind".

In December 2025, B1A4 departed WM Entertainment after 14 years with the agency. It was also announced that the group established their own company, with the members registered as its executive directors.

On April 3, 2026, B1A4 kicked off the countdown to their 9th mini album, 'Set', with a group teaser image and will release their 9th mini album just 2 days before their debut anniversary, which falls on April 23 to celebrate their 15th debut anniversary.

== Public image ==
The group has been dubbed "countryside-dols" (countryside idols) by the Korean media due to the fact that all of the members of B1A4 are from outside the Seoul metropolitan area: Jinyoung is from Chungju, North Chungcheong Province; CNU from Cheongju, North Chungcheong Province; Sandeul from Busan; Baro from Gwangju, South Jeolla Province; and Gongchan from Suncheon, South Jeolla Province. They were also referred to as "blood-dols" (blood idols) in reference to the origins of their name (which references the group members' blood types), as well as "paper-dols" (paper idols) because of the paper classification A4. In an effort to distinguish themselves, B1A4 had also promoted a nickname "saessakdol" (새싹돌, "sprout-dol") and created a so-called "saessakchum" (새싹춤, "sprout dance"), which was showcased in various shows including Quiz to Change the World.

In January 2015, B1A4 members hugged Muslim female fans in a meet and greet session in Malaysia. Internet commenters called for the organizers to be charged afterwards.

== Philanthropy ==
B1A4 have participated in philanthropic acts throughout their career.

On May 31, 2012, it was reported that B1A4 had visited a fan's home to prepare a meal and help take care of the fan's ill mother. On August 31 that year, the group donated 140 kg of rice garlands initially donated by fans to Seoul SOS Youth Camp in Yangcheon District. On September 1, 2012, B1A4 held a mini concert at the Wonju Market to help raise awareness for traditional markets. As they hosted their first solo concert, BABA B1A4, fans from all over the world sent gifts and donations to B1A4, which the group then donated to charity.

On July 19, 2013, as B1A4 prepared for their second solo concert, B1A4 asked fans for school supplies rather than flower wreaths. They were working with CJ Group's charity foundation "Donor's Camp" to support the education of children who are in need.

The group donated part of the proceeds from their third solo concert to Seoul Arts College's matriculation ceremony, which took place on February 27, 2014, at the Olympic Park Olympic Hall. Seoul Arts College used the donation to purchase rice to be given to the charities Gangnam Start Center and Gangnam Vision Center. In December that year, they participated in a charity event to raise funds to provide those in need with coal briquettes for heating.

== Discography ==
Korean albums

- Ignition (2012)
- Who Am I (2014)
- Good Timing (2016)
- Origine (2020)

Japanese albums

- 1 (2012)
- 2 (2014)
- 3 (2016)
- 4 (2017)
- 5 (2018)

== Filmography ==
- MTV Match Up (2011)
- B1A4's Selca Diary (2012)
- B1A4's Real Player (2012)
- B1A4's Hello Baby Season 6 (2012)
- Wide Entertainment News (2013)
- B1A4's One Fine Day (2014)
- A Song For You (2015)

== Concerts and tours ==
=== Korean tours ===
- 2012: BABA B1A4
- 2013: Limited Show [Amazing Store]
- 2014: THE CLASS
- 2015: B1A4 ADVENTURE
- 2017 : LIVE SPACE

=== Japanese tours ===
- 2013: BABA B1A4 in Japan
- 2013: Limited Show [Amazing Store] in Japan (Zepp Tour)
- 2014: Listen to the B1A4 (Arena Tour)
- 2016: The Great World Of B1A4
- 2017: Be The One
- 2018: Paradise

=== World tours ===
- 2014: B1A4 Road Trip – Ready?
- 2015–2016: B1A4 ADVENTURE
- 2017: 4 Nights in the U.S

== Awards and nominations ==
Year presented, name of the award ceremony, award category and the result of the nomination
Year	Program	Awards	Result	Ref.
2011	Mnet Asian Music Awards	Best New Male Artist	Nominated	
2011	SBS MTV Best of the Best	Hot Debut Star	Won	
2011	SBS MTV Best of the Best	Best New Artist	Nominated	
2011	26th Golden Disk Awards	Rookie Award	Won	
2011	21st Seoul Music Awards	Best New Artist	Won	
2011	Wave K's Super Rookies	Super Rookies for 2012	Won	
2012	Gaon Chart K-Pop Awards	Best Male Newcomer	Won	
2012	Asia Song Festival	New Asian Artist	Won	
2013	Japan Gold Disc Awards	New Artist of The Year	Won	
2013	Japan Gold Disc Awards	Best 3 New Artists	Won	
2013	27th Golden Disk Awards	Disk Bonsang	Won	
2013	Mnet Asian Music Awards	Best Dance Performance – Male Group	Nominated	
2013	Mnet Asian Music Awards	BC – UnionPay Song of the Year	Nominated	
2013	SBS MTV Best of the Best Awards	Best Male Group	Nominated	
2014	Seoul Music Awards	Popularity Award	Won	
2014	Seoul Music Awards	Bonsang Award	Won	
2014	28th Golden Disk Awards	Disk Bonsang Album	Won	
2014	28th Golden Disk Awards	Popularity Award	Nominated	
2014	16th Seoul International Youth Film Festival	Best OST by a Male Artist	Nominated	
2014	MNET Asian Music Awards	Best Male Group	Nominated	
2014	MNET Asian Music Awards	BC Union Pay Artist of the Year	Nominated	
2015	29th Golden Disk Awards	Disk Bonsang Album	Won	
2015	Seoul Music Awards	Bonsang Awards	Won	
2015	21st Korean Entertainment Arts Awards	Popularity Award Choose By Netizen	Won	
2015	MTV Europe Music Awards	Best Korean Act	Nominated	
2016	31st Korean Best Dresser SWAN AWARD	Best Dressed, Male Singer	Won	
2018	32nd Golden Disc Awards	Disc Bonsang – Rollin	Nominated	
2018	32nd Golden Disc Awards	Global Popularity Award	Nominated	
