= Let's Fly =

EP by B1A4
- Released: April 21, 2011
- Recorded: 2011
- Genres: K-pop, Dance-pop
- Length: 21:09
- Language: Korean
- Label: WM Entertainment
- Producer: Lee Sang-ho

B1A4 chronology
Let's Fly (2011)	It B1A4 (2011)

Singles from Let's Fly
- 1. "OK" Released: April 21, 2011; 2. "Only Learned Bad Things" Released: July 13, 2011

Let's Fly is the first mini-album released by B1A4 under WM Entertainment on April 21, 2011. The songs were mainly composed by Lee Sang-ho but Im Sanghyuk (Beast’s main songwriter) and Jeon Dawoon (K.Will’s main songwriter) have participated in the album along with all the members especially Jinyoung who was directly involved with the songwriting. All rap lyrics were written by Baro.

== Track listing ==
No.	Title	Lyrics	Music	Length
1.	"O.K."	Geul Gongjang	Seo Young Bae	4:13
2.	"Remember"	Park Gangil	Park Gangil	3:16
3.	"Only Learned Bad Things" (못된 것만 배워서; Motdwoen Geotman Baewoseo)	Wheesung	Lim Sang Hyuk, Jeon Da Woon, Lee Sang Ho	3:43
4.	"Bling Girl"	Jinyoung	Jinyoung	3:37
5.	"Only One"	Hwang Sungjin	Lee Juhyung, Lee Sang Ho	3:37
6.	"O.K" (Instrumental)	-	Seo Young Bae	3:33
Total length:				21:09

- "Only Learned Bad Things" samples an interlope from "Love on a Two-Way Street" (1970) by The Moments.

== Charts ==
Chart (2011)	Peak position
Gaon Album Chart	6
