= Baro (entertainer) =

South Korean actor (born 1992)

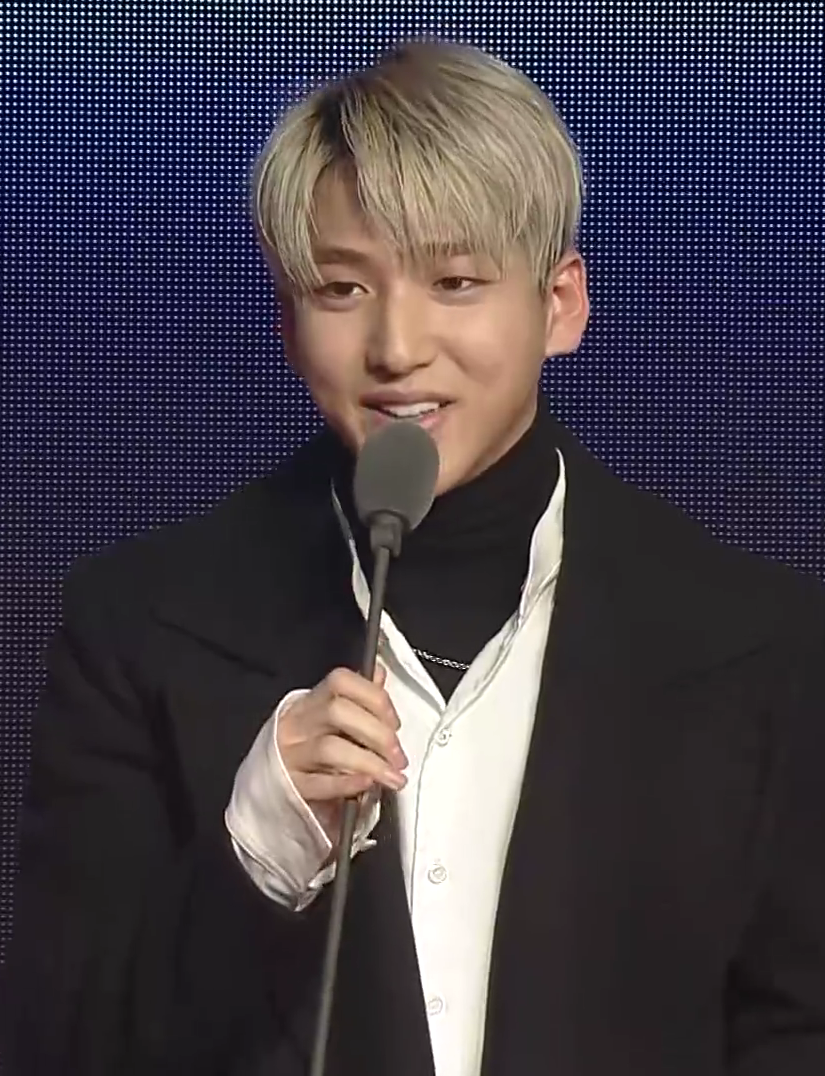
- Baro in January 2017
- Born: Cha Sun-woo; September 5, 1992 (age 34); Gwangju, South Korea
- Occupations: Actor; rapper; singer; songwriter
- Years active: 2011–present
- Agent: Media Lab Seesaw (SISO)
- Relatives: I (sister)
- Musical career
- Genres: K-pop; Hip hop
- Label: WM
- Formerly of: B1A4

Korean name
- Hangul: 차선우
- Hanja: 車善玗
- RR: Cha Seonu
- MR: Ch'a Sŏnu

Stage name
- Hangul: 바로
- RR: Baro
- MR: Paro

Cha Sun-woo (Korean: 차선우, born September 5, 1992), better known by his stage name Baro, is a South Korean actor, rapper, singer, and songwriter. He is a former member of boy band B1A4 and is currently under Media Lab Seesaw (SISO). He made his acting debut through the hit 2013 cable drama Reply 1994 and additionally received critical acclaim for his role in the television series God's Gift: 14 Days (2014) and Angry Mom (2015).

== Early life ==
Baro was born in Gwangju, South Korea with one younger sister who is four years younger than him (debuting in 2017 with the stage name "I").

== Career ==
=== Pre-debut ===
Baro was first discovered by a company representative who came across his photo posted on his friend's homepage on social network service Cyworld. At his audition, Baro sang Sumi Jo's "Once I Leave" and Sung Si-kyung's "The Road to Me", in addition to rapping and beatboxing. Baro then joined the company, training for at least 2 years before debuting.

=== 2011−2018: B1A4 ===
After years of training, Baro joined as the main rapper of B1A4. On April 11, 2011, WM Entertainment revealed Baro as the second member to be revealed after Jinyoung.

On April 20, 2011, B1A4 released their debut Track "OK" and mini album "Let's Fly", making their debut on April 23, 2011 on MBC's Show! Music Core.

=== 2018–present: Group departure and acting activities ===
On June 30, 2018, WM Entertainment confirmed that Baro and Jinyoung had left the agency following the end of their contracts. Their activities with the group remain in discussion. In November 16, WM Entertainment has announced that B1A4 members Jinyoung and Baro will be leaving the agency, with the remaining three members—CNU, Sandeul, and Gongchan—to continue promoting as B1A4.

On November 8, 2023, it was announced that Baro had signed a contract with Media Lab Seesaw (SISO), following the expiration contract with HODU&U Entertainment.

== Personal life ==
On June 5, 2013, while preparing for B1A4's follow up single "Starlight's Song", Baro strained his ankle ligament. Initially, the group was going to adjust its promotional tour depending on Baro's recovery. However, because his recovery took longer than they had expected, the What's Going On Tour ended earlier than planned.

== Filmography ==
=== Film ===
Year	Title	Role	Notes	Ref.
2013	Misaeng: Prequel	Kim Young-chan	Short film	
2014	The Seventh Dwarf	Bobo	Animated, Korean dubbed	
2015	That's Not It	Boy	Short film	
2017	Close Your Eyes	Kim Hyeon-woo		
2021	Fearsome	Jae Hyuk		
2022	Delusion	Yeong-jun		
2023	Windmill	Lee Jeong-hun		
2023	Annapurna	Seon-woo		
2025	No Parking	Oh Dong-hyeon		
2025	The Cursed	Yoon-geon		

=== Television series ===
Year	Title	Role	Notes	Ref.
2013	Reply 1994	Binggeure		
2014	God's Gift: 14 Days	Ki Young-kyu		
2015	Persevere, Goo Hae-ra	Robin Cha	Cameo	
2015	Angry Mom	Hong Sang-tae		
2016	The Master of Revenge	Kim Gil-do (young)		
2017	Manhole	Jo Seok-tae		
2018	Less Than Evil	Hwang Dong-yoon		
2019	Two Hearts	Cha Sun-woo		
2019	Level Up	Kwak Han-cheol		
2019	Melting Me Softly	Hwang Byung-shim (24 years old)		
2021	Idol: The Coup	Troy		
2022	Reborn Rich	Yoon Hyun-min	Cameo (episode 1, 16)	
2023	It Was Spring	Hwang Gu		
2023	KBS Drama Special – "Shoot For Love"	Jung Moo-won	One act-drama	

=== Web series ===
Year	Title	Role	Ref.
2015	Loss: Time: Life	Baro	
2022	Grid	Jeong Him-chan	
2023	The Villain of Romance	Kang Hee-jae	
2025	Sonny's Competition	Son Jin-u	
2025	He's Back	Jeong-min	

== Theater ==
Year	English title	Korean title	Role	Ref.
2023	Hello, the Hell: Othello	헬로, 더 헬: 오델로	Iagoro	

== Awards and nominations ==
Year	Award	Category	Nominated work	Result
2014	50th Baeksang Arts Awards	Best New Actor (TV)	God's Gift: 14 Days	Nominated
2014	50th Baeksang Arts Awards	Most Popular Actor (TV)	God's Gift: 14 Days	Nominated
2014	16th Seoul International Youth Film Festival	Best New Actor	God's Gift: 14 Days	Nominated
2014	3rd APAN Star Awards	Best New Actor	God's Gift: 14 Days	Nominated
2015	34th MBC Drama Awards	Best New Actor in a Miniseries	Angry Mom	Nominated
