= Oh My Girl discography =

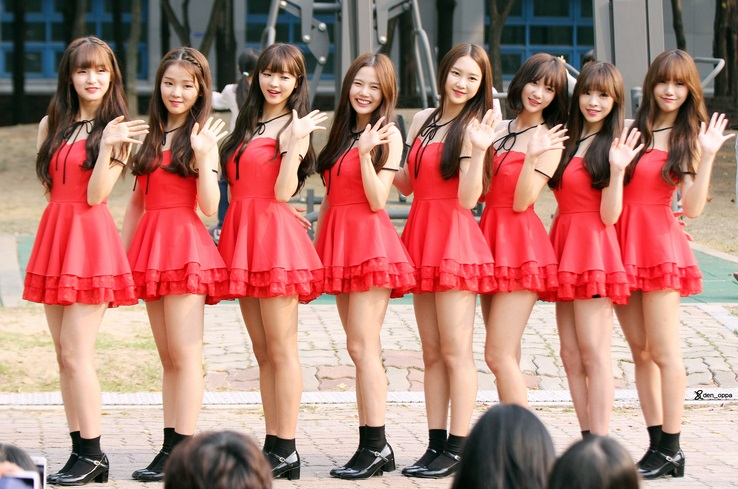
- Oh My Girl in October 2015
- Studio albums: 5
- EPs: 12
- Compilation albums: 1
- Singles: 24
- Music videos: 30
- Reissues: 2
- Single albums: 1

South Korean girl group Oh My Girl has released five studio albums, one compilation album, twelve extended plays, two repackage albums, one single album and twenty-four singles. The group was formed by the Korean entertainment company WM Entertainment in 2015. The group's debut mini album, Oh My Girl, was released on April 20, 2015. On October 8, 2015, their second extended play titled Closer was released. The group's third mini album, Pink Ocean was released on March 28, 2016, along with its lead single "Liar Liar". After almost 2 months, they released a repackage album of Pink Ocean, titled Windy Day with two additional tracks and a Chinese version of "Liar Liar". On August 1, 2016, they released Listen to My Word, a special summer album containing four remake songs, including Papaya's "Listen to My Word (A-ing)" featuring Skull and Haha.

== Albums ==
=== Studio albums ===
List of studio albums, with selected details and chart positions
Title	Details	Peak positions			Sales
Title	Details	KOR	JPN	JPN Hot	Sales
Korean
The Fifth Season	Released: May 8, 2019; Label: WM Entertainment; Formats: CD, digital download	4	—	—	KOR: 30,490
Real Love	Released: March 28, 2022; Label: WM Entertainment; Formats: CD, digital download	5	41	—	KOR: 96,937; JPN: 877 (Phy.)
Japanese
Oh My Girl Japan Debut Album (Note: The Korean edition of Oh My Girl Japan Debut Album was released on March 15, 2019 by Sony Music Entertainment Korea.)	Released: January 9, 2019; Label: Ariola Japan; Formats: CD, digital download; Track listing: 1. "Remember Me" (花火} (Japanese ver.); 2. "Secret Garden" (Japanese ver.); 3. "Coloring Book" (Japanese ver.); 4. "Windy Day" (Japanese ver.); 5. "Liar Liar" (Japanese ver.); 6. "Closer" (Japanese ver.); 7. "Cupid" (Japanese ver.); 8. "Remember Me" (불꽃놀이)	54	2	4	JPN: 16,200
Oh My Girl Japan 2nd Album (Note: The Korean edition of Oh My Girl Japan 2nd Album was released on December 13, 2019 by Sony Music Entertainment Korea.)	Released: July 3, 2019; Label: Ariola Japan; Formats: CD, digital download; Track listing: 1. "The Fifth Season (SSFWL)" (五番目の季節) (Japanese ver.); 2. "Listen to My Word (A-ing)" (feat. Hashishi from Denpa Girl) (Japanese ver.); 3. "One Step, Two Steps" (一歩二歩) (Japanese ver.); 4. "Twilight" (Japanese ver.); 5. "Sixteen" (Japanese ver.); 6. "Touch My Heart"; 7. "Hold Me" (抱きしめるの); 8. "The Fifth Season (SSFWL)" (다섯 번째 계절); 9. "Listen to My Word (A-ing)" (feat. Skull and Haha) (내 얘길 들어봐) [CD only]; 10. "One Step, Two Steps" (한 발짝 두 발짝) [CD only]; 11. "Twilight" (Korean ver.) [CD only]; 12. "Sixteen" (Korean ver.) [CD only]	89	7	6	JPN: 19,862
Eternally (Note: The Korean edition of Eternally was released on May 22, 2020 by Sony Music Entertainment Korea.)	Released: January 8, 2020; Label: Ariola Japan; Formats: CD, digital download; Track listing: 1. "Bungee" (Japanese ver.); 2. "Eternally"; 3. "Precious Moment"; 4. "Fly to the Sky"; 5. "Polaris"; 6. "Guerilla" (게릴라); 7. "Bungee (Fall in Love)" (번지); 8. "Love O'Clock" (러브어클락); 9. "Shower" (소나기) [CD only]; 10. "I Found Love" [CD only]; 11. "B612" [CD only]; 12. "Perfect Day" [CD only]	60	4	4	JPN: 17,358
"—" denotes releases that did not chart or were not released in that region.

=== Compilation albums ===
List of compilation albums, with selected details and chart positions
Title	Details	Peak positions		Sales
Title	Details	KOR	JPN	Sales
Oh My Girl Best	Released: March 30, 2022 (JPN); Label: Ariola Japan; Formats: CD, digital download; Track listing: Disc 1; 1. "Real Love" (Japanese ver.); 2. "Dun Dun Dance" (Japanese ver.); 3. "Dolphin" (Japanese ver.); 4. "Nonstop" (Japanese ver.); 5. "Etoile"; 6. "Eternally"; 7. "Bungee (Fall in Love)" (Japanese ver.); 8. "五番目の季節" (The Fifth Season) (SSFWL) (Japanese ver.); 9. "花火" (Remember Me) (Japanese ver.); 10. "Twilight" (Japanese ver.); 11. "Secret Garden" (Japanese ver.); 12. "Sixteen" (Japanese ver.); 13. "Coloring Book" (Japanese ver.); 14. "A-ing" (Japanese ver.); 15. "Windy Day" (Japanese ver.); 16. "Liar Liar" (Japanese ver.); 17. "一歩二歩" (Step by Step) Japanese ver.); 18. "Closer" (Japanese ver.); 19. "Cupid" (Japanese ver.); Disc 2 (Limited edition A・B only); 1. "Real Love"; 2. "Dun Dun Dance"; 3. "Dolphin"; 4. "살짝 설렜어" (Nonstop); 5. "Bungee (Fall in Love)"; 6. "다섯 번째 계절" (The Fifth Season) (SSFWL); 7. "불꽃놀이" (Remember Me); 8. "Twilight"; 9. "비밀정원" (Secret Garden); 10. "Sixteen"; 11. "컬러링북" (Coloring Book); 12. "내 얘길 들어봐" (Listen to My Word) (A-ing) (Feat. Skull & Haha); 13. "Windy Day"; 14. "Liar Liar"; 15. "한 발짝 두 발짝" (Step by Step); 16. "Closer"; 17. "Cupid"; Bonus track, Limited edition B only 18. "Etoile" (Korean ver.); 19. "Etoile" (English ver.); Disc 3 (Limited edition A only); 1. "Lemonade"; 2. "Tear Rain"; 3. "Precious Moment"; 4. "Fly to the Sky"; 5. "Polaris"; 6. "Touch My Heart"; 7. "抱きしめるの"	88	14	JPN: 6,037

=== Reissues ===
List of reissues, with selected chart positions and sales
Title	Details	Peak positions	Sales
Title	Details	KOR	Sales
Windy Day	Released: May 26, 2016; Label: WM Entertainment; Formats: CD, digital download	4	KOR: 20,221; JPN: 3,528
Fall in Love	Released: August 5, 2019; Label: WM Entertainment; Formats: CD, digital download	5	KOR: 20,281

=== Single albums ===
List of single albums, with selected details and chart positions
Title	Details	Peak positions	Sales
Title	Details	KOR	Sales
Listen to My Word	Released: August 1, 2016; Label: WM Entertainment; Formats: CD, digital download	1	KOR: 26,106

== Extended plays ==
List of extended plays, with selected chart positions and sales
Title	Details	Peak chart positions				Sales
Title	Details	KOR	JPN	JPN Hot	US World	Sales
Oh My Girl	Released: April 20, 2015 (KOR); Label: WM Entertainment; Formats: CD, digital download	6	—	—	—	KOR: 10,021
Closer	Released: October 8, 2015 (KOR); Label: WM Entertainment; Formats: CD, digital download	6	—	—	—	KOR: 11,931
Pink Ocean	Released: March 28, 2016 (KOR); Label: WM Entertainment; Formats: CD, digital download	5	—	—	—	KOR: 14,790; JPN: 909
Coloring Book	Released: April 3, 2017 (KOR); Label: WM Entertainment; Formats: CD, digital download	3	—	—	—	KOR: 29,736; JPN: 1,406
Secret Garden	Released: January 9, 2018 (KOR); Label: WM Entertainment; Formats: CD, digital download	4	44	—	12	KOR: 35,692; JPN: 1,952
Banana Allergy Monkey (As Oh My Girl Banhana)	Released: April 2, 2018 (KOR); Label: WM Entertainment; Formats: CD, digital download; Track listing: 1. "Ukiuki Waikiki" (Intro); 2. "Banana Allergy Monkey" (바나나 알러지 원숭이) [Hyojung, Binnie, Arin]; 3. "It Is Said" (하더라) [Mimi, YooA, Seunghee, Jiho]; 4. "I'm Not in Love with You" (반한 게 아냐) [Seunghee solo]	5	—	—	—	KOR: 16,058; JPN: 367
Banana Allergy Monkey (As Oh My Girl Banhana)	Released: August 29, 2018 (JPN); Label: Ariola Japan; Formats: CD, digital download; Track listing: 1. "Ukiuki Waikiki" (Intro); 2. "Banana Allergy Monkey" (バナナが食べれないサル) [Hyojung, Binnie, Arin]; 3. "It Is Said" (そうなんだって) [Mimi, YooA, Seunghee, Jiho]; 4. "I'm Not in Love with You" (惚れたんじゃない) [Seunghee solo]; 5. "Banana Allergy Monkey" (Inst.); 6. "It Is Said" (Inst.); 7. "I'm Not in Love with You" (Inst.)	—	13	19	—	JPN: 7,470
Remember Me	Released: September 10, 2018 (KOR); Label: WM Entertainment; Formats: CD, digital download	3	—	—	13	KOR: 35,671; JPN: 639
Nonstop	Released: April 27, 2020 (KOR); Label: WM Entertainment; Formats: CD, digital download	3	8	—	—	KOR: 52,080; JPN: 1,671
Dear OhMyGirl	Released: May 10, 2021 (KOR); Label: WM Entertainment; Formats: CD, digital download	3	22	—	—	KOR: 111,804
Golden Hourglass	Released: July 24, 2023 (KOR); Label: WM Entertainment; Formats: CD, digital download; Track listing: 1. "Celebrate"; 2. "Summer Comes" (여름이 들려); 3. "Queen B" (내 Type); 4. "Dirty Laundry"; 5. "Paradise"; 6. "Miracle" (미라클)	12	—	—	—	KOR: 82,019
Dreamy Resonance	Released: August 26, 2024 (KOR); Label: WM Entertainment; Formats: CD, digital download; Track listing: 1. "Classified"; 2. "Start Up"; 3. "La La La La" [Mimi, Seunghee]; 4. "Sway (You & I)" [Yubin, Arin]; 5. "Love Me Like You Do" [Hyojung, YooA]; 6. "Heavenly"	8	—	—	—	KOR: 58,455
"—" denotes releases that did not chart or were not released in that region.

== Singles ==
List of singles, with selected chart positions, showing year released and album name
Title	Year	Peak chart positions				Sales (DL)	Certifications	Album
Title	Year	KOR	KOR Hot	JPN	US World	Sales (DL)	Certifications	Album
Korean
"Cupid"	2015	103	—N/a	—	—	KOR: 22,629		Oh My Girl
"Closer"	2015	75	—N/a	—	12	KOR: 53,050		Closer
"Step by Step" (한 발짝 두 발짝)	2016	79	—N/a	—	—	KOR: 71,321		Pink Ocean
"Liar Liar"	2016	58	—N/a	—	9	KOR: 116,090		Pink Ocean
"Windy Day"	2016	62	—N/a	—	23	KOR: 161,702		Windy Day
"Listen to My Word (A-ing)" (내 얘길 들어봐) (featuring Skull & Haha)	2016	15	—N/a	—	—	KOR: 213,833		Listen to My Word
"Coloring Book"	2017	37	—N/a	—	—	KOR: 70,189		Coloring Book
"Secret Garden" (비밀정원) (Note: "Secret Garden (Japanese ver.)" was released on December 28, 2018 as the second single from Oh My Girl Japan Debut Album.)	2018	17	10	—	—	—N/a		Secret Garden
"Banana Allergy Monkey" (바나나 알러지 원숭이) (Note: "Banana Allergy Monkey (Japanese ver.)" was released on July 25, 2018 as a single from Banana Allergy Monkey, Oh My Girl Banhana's debut Japanese EP.) (as Oh My Girl Banhana)	2018	—	—	—	—	—N/a		Banana Allergy Monkey
"Remember Me" (불꽃놀이) (Note: "Remember Me (Japanese ver.)" was released on December 21, 2018 as the first single from Oh My Girl Japan Debut Album.)	2018	36	33	—	—	—N/a		Remember Me
"Love Speed" (사랑 속도) (with Yoo Jae-hwan)	2019	—	—	—	—	—N/a		Non-album single
"The Fifth Season (SSFWL)" (다섯 번째 계절) (Note: "The Fifth Season (Japanese ver.)" was released on June 12, 2019 as a single from Oh My Girl Japan 2nd Album.)	2019	26	15	—	—	—N/a		The Fifth Season
"Bungee (Fall in Love)" (Note: "Bungee (Japanese ver.)" was released on October 30, 2019 as the first single from Eternally.)	2019	50	16	—	—	—N/a		Fall in Love
"Nonstop" (살짝 설렜어) (Note: "Nonstop (Japanese ver.)" was released on June 29, 2020.)	2020	2	1	11	14	—N/a	KMCA: Platinum	Nonstop
"Dun Dun Dance" (Note: "Dun Dun Dance (Japanese ver.)" was released on September 22, 2021.)	2021	1	2	8	—	—N/a	KMCA: Platinum	Dear OhMyGirl
"Real Love"	2022	22	16	—	—	—N/a		Real Love
"Summer Comes" (여름이 들려)	2023	32	20	—	—	—N/a		Golden Hourglass
"Classified"	2024	79	—	—	—	—N/a		Dreamy Resonance
"Oh My"	2025	—	—	—	—	—N/a		Non-album single
Japanese
"Eternally"	2019	—	—	—	—	—N/a		Eternally
"Lemonade"	2020	—	—	—	—	—N/a		Etoile / Nonstop (Japanese ver.)
"Tear Rain"	2020	—	—	—	—	—N/a		Etoile / Nonstop (Japanese ver.)
"Etoile" (Note: The Japanese language version was released digitally on October 8, 2020. The Korean language version was released digitally on October 15th.)	2020	— (Note: "Etoile" (Korean version) did not enter the Gaon Digital Chart, but appeared at number 155 on the component Download Chart.)	—	11	—	—N/a		Etoile / Nonstop (Japanese ver.)
"Dolphin" (Japanese ver.)	2021	—	—	—	—	—N/a		Dun Dun Dance (Japanese ver.)
English
"Rocket Ride" (Note: This single contains two tracks, a fully English version with Oh My Girl featuring Mougleta, and a fully Korean version just with Oh My Girl.)	2020	—	—	—	—	—N/a		Non-album single
"—" denotes releases that did not chart or were not released in that region.

=== Promotional singles ===
Title	Year	Peak chart positions	Album
Title	Year	KOR	Album
"Safety Newspaper" (안전신문고) (Note: This single was used in a promotional campaign for App Public Service Ad by National Security Safe Place TV.)	2016	—	Non-album single
"Supadupa" (천천히 해봐) (Note: This promotional single was a character song for the Korean animated series Pororo the Little Penguin, with b-side Bara Bam (바라밤).)	2020	—	Po~MyGirl
"Snow Ball" (스노우볼) (as Oh My Girl Banhana with Pororo, Loopy) (Note: This promotional single was a special holiday song collaboration with the Korean animated series Pororo the Little Penguin.)	2020	—	Po~MyGirl Banhana for Christmas
"Boggle Boggle" (보글보글)	2021	—	Po~MyGirl Boggle Boggle
"Shark" (Note: "Shark" was released as a promotional single in collaboration with Universe.)	2021	134	Non-album single

== Other collaborations ==
Title	Year	Artists	Album
"The Love of Fingertips" (손끝의 사랑)	2016	B1A4, Eunkwang, Changsub, Youngji, A-JAX, APRIL, Oh My Girl, Kassy	Non-album single
"White" (화이트)	2016	Haha, Oh My Girl (feat. M. Tyson)	1 Love Winter
"The Shouts of Reds 2018" (승리의 함성 2018)	2018	Transfixion, Oh My Girl	We, the Reds
"Timing" (타이밍)	2018	B1A4, Oh My Girl, ONF	Hello! WM
"Ours" (너와 나의 시대)	2020	B1A4, Oh My Girl, ONF	Hello! WM

== Appearances on compilations ==
Title	Year	Album
"You're Smiling as Pretty as a Doll" (그대는 인형처럼 웃고 있지만)	2017	Immortal Songs: Singing the Legend (Edited by Kang In-won)
"Sweet 18" (낭랑 18세)	2017	Immortal Songs: Singing the Legend (Composer Park Si-chun)

== Soundtrack appearances ==
Title	Year	Album
"Hello Love" (너의 귓가에 안녕)	2016	Drinking Solo OST
"Ma Friend"	2016	The Haunted House: The Secret of the Ghost Ball OST
"Eternalism"	2017	Blood Blockade Battlefront & Beyond OST
"Sweet Heart" (As Oh My Girl Banhana)	2018	Clean with Passion for Now OST
"Remember" (기억해)	2019	Wannabe Challenge OST
"I know" (by Seunghee, Binnie and Jiho)	2020	Start-up OST
"I Love You Teacher" (by Hyojung, Mimi, Binnie)	2021	Racket Boys OST
"Say It to Me" (by Hyojung, YooA, JIHO)	2021	Kartrider X Line Friends OST Part 2

== Other songs ==
List of other songs, with selected chart positions and sales figures, showing year released and album name
Title	Year	Peak chart positions		Sales	Certifications	Album
Title	Year	KOR	KOR Hot	Sales	Certifications	Album
"Destiny" (나의 지구)	2019	70	53	—N/a	—N/a	Queendom <Cover Performances> Pt. 2
"Twilight"	2019	—	—	—N/a	—N/a	Queendom <Fan-dora's Box>, Pt. 2
"Guerilla" (게릴라)	2019	87	46	—N/a	—N/a	Queendom Final Comeback Singles / Eternity
"Dolphin"	2020	9	6	—N/a	KMCA: Platinum; RIAJ: Gold (st.)	Nonstop
"Flower Tea" (꽃차)	2020	—	94	—N/a	—N/a	Nonstop
"Neon"	2020	—	95	—N/a	—N/a	Nonstop
"Krystal"	2020	—	93	—N/a	—N/a	Nonstop
"Dear You" (나의 봄에게)	2021	128	100	—N/a	—N/a	Dear OhMyGirl
"My Doll" (나의 인형 (안녕, 꿈에서 놀아))	2021	172	—	—N/a	—N/a	Dear OhMyGirl
"Swan"	2021	154	—	—N/a	—N/a	Dear OhMyGirl
"—" denotes releases that did not chart or were not released in that region.

== Videography ==
=== Music videos ===
Year	Title	Director
2015	"Cupid"	Hong Won-ki (Zanybros)
2015	"Closer"	Yoo Sung-kyun (Sunny Visual)
2016	"Liar Liar"	Digipedi
2016	"Windy Day"	Digipedi
2016	"Listen to My Word (A-ing)"	Lee Inhoon (Segaji Video)
2016	"White"	Unknown
2017	"Coloring Book"	Shin Hee-won (Stories We Tell)
2018	"Secret Garden"	Yoo Sung-kyun (Sunny Visual)
2018	"Banana Allergy Monkey"	Yoo Sung-kyun (Sunny Visual)
2018	"Banana Allergy Monkey (Japanese ver.)"	Hiroki Kashiwa
2018	"Remember Me"	Yoo Sung-kyun (Sunny Visual)
2019	"The Fifth Season (SSFWL)"	Yoo Sung-kyun (Sunny Visual)
2019	"Bungee (Fall in Love)"	Yoo Sung-kyun (Sunny Visual)
2019	"Bungee (Japanese ver.)" (Live ver.)	Yasunori Sato
2019	"Eternally" (Live ver.)	Yasunori Sato
2020	"Nonstop"	Yoo Sung-kyun (Sunny Visual)
2020	"Dolphin"	Yoo Sung-kyun (Sunny Visual)
2020	"Nonstop (Japanese Version)"	Yoo Sung-kyun (Sunny Visual)
2020	"SUPADUPA"	Jinwoo Park
2020	"Bara Bam"	Unknown
2020	"Etoile"	Hiroki Kashiwa
2020	"Snow Ball (with Pororo, Loopy) (Dancealong ver.)"	Unknown
2020	"Snow Ball (Dancealong ver.)"	Unknown
2020	"Snow Ball (with Pororo, Loopy)"	Unknown
2021	"BOGGLE BOGGLE"	Unknown
2021	"Baby Good Night"	Unknown
2021	"Dun Dun Dance"	Sunny Visual
2022	"Real Love"	Sunny Visual
2023	"Summer Comes"	Sunny Visual
2024	"Classified"	Lee Inhoon
2025	"Oh My"	Jimmy (Via)
