= Queendom Final Comeback =

EP by contestants from South Korean survival show

EP by Queendom contestants
- Released: October 25, 2019
- Genre: K-Pop
- Length: 22:00
- Language: Korean
- Label: Stone Music Entertainment

AOA chronology
Bingle Bangle (2018)	Queendom Final Comeback (2019)	New Moon (2019)

Lovelyz chronology
Once Upon a Time (2019)	Queendom Final Comeback (2019)	Unforgettable (2020)

Park Bom chronology
Spring (2019)	Queendom Final Comeback (2019)

Oh My Girl chronology
Fall in Love (2019)	Queendom Final Comeback (2019)	Eternally (2020)

(G)I-dle chronology
Latata (2019)	Queendom Final Comeback (2019)	I Trust (2020)

Mamamoo chronology
4colors (2019)	Queendom Final Comeback (2019)	Reality in Black (2019)

Queendom Final Comeback (stylized as "Queendom <FINAL Comeback>") is an EP by Queendom contestants of the South Korean survival show Queendom. It was released online for download on October 25, 2019, by Stone Music Entertainment.

== Background ==
Queendom is a South Korean survival show that aired on Mnet. The program is a comeback battle between six trending girl group acts, in order to "determine the real number one" when all six release their songs at the same time.

On the 10th episode, Final Live Comeback Stages, the teams will each perform a newly produced song live from different producers, with different genres.

"Destiny" was later included in Mamamoo's second Korean studio album Reality in Black, released on November 14, 2019.

"Sorry" was later included in AOA's sixth mini-album New Moon released on November 26, 2019.

"Wanna Go Back" was later released alongside Park Bom's single First Snow, on December 10, 2019.

"Guerilla" was later included in Oh My Girl's third Japanese studio album Eternally, released on January 8, 2020.

"Lion" was later included in (G)I-dle's third mini-album I Trust, released on April 6, 2020.

== Track listing ==
Released on October 25, 2019
No.	Title	Lyrics	Music	Artist	Length
1.	"Sorry"	Han Sung-ho; Jimin; Christopher	Sebastian Thott; Didrik Thott; Brooke Williams; (Note: Arranged by Sebastian Thott)	AOA	3:39
2.	"Moonlight"	Fuxxy; Vincenzo; Any Masingga; Anna Timgren	Fuxxy; Vincenzo; Any Masingga; Anna Timgren; (Note: Arranged by Vincenzo and Any Masingga)	Lovelyz	3:26
3.	"Wanna Go Back" (되돌릴 수 없는 돌아갈 수 없는 돌아갈 곳 없는)	Brave Brothers; Chakun	Mozaix; Brave Brothers; Chakun; (Note: Arranged by Mozaix and Alawn)	Park Bom	3:37
4.	"Guerilla" (게릴라)	Seo Ji-eum; Mimi	Steven Lee; Joe Lawrence; Caroline Gustavsson; (Note: Arranged by Steven Lee and Joe Lawrence)	Oh My Girl	3:47
5.	"Lion"	Soyeon	Soyeon; Big Sancho (Yummy Tone); (Note: Arranged by Big Sancho (Yummy Tone) and Soyeon)	(G)I-dle	3:30
6.	"Destiny" (우린 결국 다시 만날 운명이었지)	Kim Do-hoon; Park Woo-sang	Kim Do-hoon; Park Woo-sang; (Note: Arranged by Kim Do-hoon and Park Woo-sang)	Mamamoo	4:07
Total length:					22:00

== Release history ==
Region	Date	Format	Label
South Korea	October 25, 2019	Digital download	Stone Music Entertainment
Various	October 25, 2019	Digital download	Stone Music Entertainment
