= List of awards and nominations received by Oh My Girl =

Oh My Girl awards and nominations
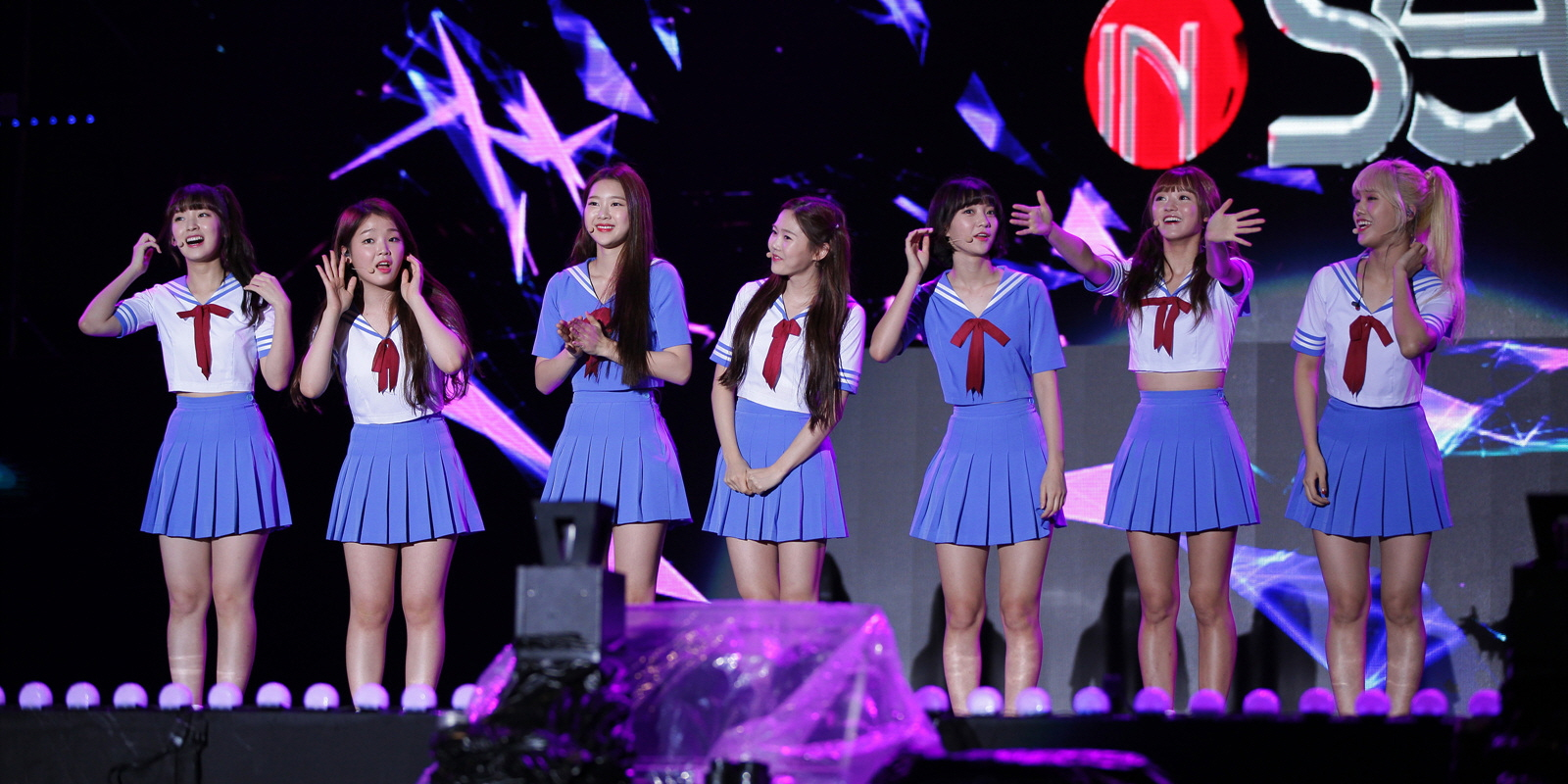
Awards and nominations
Award	Wins	Nominations
Asia Artist Awards	0	3
Brand Customer Loyalty Award	2	2
Brand of the Year Awards	2	2
Broadcast Advertising Festival	1	1
Dong-A.com's Pick	1	1
The Fact Music Awards	1	1
Gaon Chart Music Awards	2	5
Genie Music Awards	0	4
Golden Disc Awards	2	8
Hanteo Music Awards	1	1
KBS Entertainment Awards	1	1
K-Global Heart Dream Awards	2	2
Korea First Brand Awards	1	1
Korea Popular Music Awards	1	2
Korean Music Awards	0	1
MAMA Awards	0	15
Melon Music Awards	1	12
SBS Power FM Cultwo Show Awards	1	1
Seoul Music Awards	2	19
Soompi Awards	1	1
Soribada Best K-Music Awards	2	7

Totals (Note: Certain award groups do not simply award one winner. They acknowledge several different recipients, have runners-up, and have third place. Since this is a specific recognition and is different from losing an award, runner-up mentions are considered wins in this award tally. For simplification and to avoid errors, each award in this list has been presumed to have had a prior nomination.)
- Wins: 24
- Nominations: 90

This is a list of awards and nominations received by South Korean girl group Oh My Girl.

== Awards and nominations ==
Name of the award ceremony, year presented, category, nominee(s) of the award, and the result of the nomination
Award Ceremony	Year	Category	Nominee(s)	Result	Ref.
Asia Artist Awards	2016	Most Popular Artists (Singer) - Top 50	Oh My Girl	44th	
Asia Artist Awards	2019	Starnews Popularity Award	Oh My Girl	Nominated	
Asia Artist Awards	2023	Popularity Award – Singer (Female)	Oh My Girl	Nominated	
Brand Customer Loyalty Award	2021	Best Female Group	Oh My Girl	Won	
Brand Customer Loyalty Award	2022	Best Female Group	Oh My Girl	Won	
Brand of the Year Awards	2019	Female Idol of the Year	Oh My Girl	Won	
Brand of the Year Awards	2021	Female Idol of the Year	Oh My Girl	Won	
Broadcast Advertising Festival	2022	Excellence Award	Oh My Girl	Won	
Dong-A.com's Pick	2020	Totally Fluttering Award	Oh My Girl	Won	
The Fact Music Awards	2021	Artist of the Year (Bonsang)	Oh My Girl	Won	
Gaon Chart Music Awards	2016	New Artist of the Year	Oh My Girl	Nominated	
Gaon Chart Music Awards	2021	Song of the Year – April	"Nonstop"	Won	
Gaon Chart Music Awards	2021	Song of the Year – April	"Dolphin"	Nominated	
Gaon Chart Music Awards	2022	Artist of the Year (Digital Music) – May	"Dun Dun Dance"	Nominated	
Gaon Chart Music Awards	2022	Hot Performance of the Year	Oh My Girl	Won	
Genie Music Awards	2019	The Top Artist	Oh My Girl	Nominated	
Genie Music Awards	2019	The Performing Artist (Female)	Oh My Girl	Nominated	
Genie Music Awards	2019	Genie Music Popularity Award	Oh My Girl	Nominated	
Genie Music Awards	2019	Global Popularity Award	Oh My Girl	Nominated	
Golden Disc Awards	2016	Best New Artist	Oh My Girl	Nominated	
Golden Disc Awards	2016	Popularity Award	Oh My Girl	Nominated	
Golden Disc Awards	2016	Global Popularity Award	Oh My Girl	Nominated	
Golden Disc Awards	2021	Curaprox Popularity Award	Oh My Girl	Nominated	
Golden Disc Awards	2021	QQ Music Popularity Award	Oh My Girl	Nominated	
Golden Disc Awards	2021	Digital Bonsang	"Nonstop"	Won	
Golden Disc Awards	2022	Digital Song Bonsang	"Dun Dun Dance"	Won	
Golden Disc Awards	2022	Seezn Most Popular Artist Award	Oh My Girl	Nominated	
Hanteo Music Awards	2024	WhosFandom Award – Female	Oh My Girl	Won	
KBS Entertainment Awards	2025	Digital Content Award (Note: Shared with the whole cast.)	Idol 1N2D	Won	
K-Global Heart Dream Awards	2022	K-Global Heart Dream Bonsang	Oh My Girl	Won	
K-Global Heart Dream Awards	2022	K-Global Best Performance Award	Oh My Girl	Won	
Korea First Brand Awards	2020	Female Idol	Oh My Girl	Won	
Korea Popular Music Awards	2018	Artist of the Year	Oh My Girl	Nominated	
Korea Popular Music Awards	2018	Bonsang Award	Oh My Girl	Won	
Korean Music Awards	2021	Best Pop Song	"Dolphin"	Nominated	
MAMA Awards	2015	Best New Female Artist	Oh My Girl	Nominated	
MAMA Awards	2015	Artist of the Year	Oh My Girl	Nominated	
MAMA Awards	2018	Best Dance Performance - Female Group	"Secret Garden"	Nominated	
MAMA Awards	2018	Song of the Year	"Secret Garden"	Nominated	
MAMA Awards	2020	Song of the Year	"Nonstop"	Nominated	
MAMA Awards	2020	Best Dance Performance - Female Group	"Nonstop"	Nominated	
MAMA Awards	2020	Artist of the Year	Oh My Girl	Nominated	
MAMA Awards	2020	Worldwide Fans' Choice Top 10	Oh My Girl	Nominated	
MAMA Awards	2020	Best Female Group	Oh My Girl	Nominated	
MAMA Awards	2021	Best Female Group	Oh My Girl	Nominated	
MAMA Awards	2021	Artist of the Year	Oh My Girl	Nominated	
MAMA Awards	2021	Worldwide Fans' Choice Top 10	Oh My Girl	Nominated	
MAMA Awards	2021	Album of the Year	Dear OhMyGirl	Longlisted	
MAMA Awards	2021	Song of the Year	"Dun Dun Dance"	Nominated	
MAMA Awards	2021	Best Dance Performance - Female Group	"Dun Dun Dance"	Nominated	
Melon Music Awards	2015	Best New Artist	Oh My Girl	Nominated	
Melon Music Awards	2020	Album of the Year	Nonstop	Nominated	
Melon Music Awards	2020	Song of the Year	"Nonstop"	Nominated	
Melon Music Awards	2020	Best Dance Track (Female)	"Nonstop"	Nominated	
Melon Music Awards	2020	Artist of the Year	Oh My Girl	Nominated	
Melon Music Awards	2020	Top 10 Artist	Oh My Girl	Won	
Melon Music Awards	2020	Netizen Popularity Award	Oh My Girl	Nominated	
Melon Music Awards	2021	Best Female Group	Oh My Girl	Nominated	
Melon Music Awards	2021	Top 10 Artist	Oh My Girl	Nominated	
Melon Music Awards	2021	Netizen Popularity Award	Oh My Girl	Nominated	
Melon Music Awards	2021	Album of the Year	Dear OhMyGirl	Nominated	
Melon Music Awards	2021	Song of the Year	"Dun Dun Dance"	Nominated	
SBS Power FM Cultwo Show Awards	2015	Best New Artist (Female)	Oh My Girl	Won	
Seoul Music Awards	2016	Bonsang Award	Oh My Girl	Nominated	
Seoul Music Awards	2016	Rookie of the Year	Oh My Girl	Nominated	
Seoul Music Awards	2016	Popularity Award	Oh My Girl	Nominated	
Seoul Music Awards	2016	Hallyu Special Award	Oh My Girl	Nominated	
Seoul Music Awards	2017	Bonsang Award	Oh My Girl	Nominated	
Seoul Music Awards	2017	Popularity Award	Oh My Girl	Nominated	
Seoul Music Awards	2017	Hallyu Special Award	Oh My Girl	Nominated	
Seoul Music Awards	2019	Bonsang Award	Oh My Girl	Nominated	
Seoul Music Awards	2019	Popularity Award	Oh My Girl	Nominated	
Seoul Music Awards	2019	Hallyu Special Award	Oh My Girl	Nominated	
Seoul Music Awards	2020	Bonsang Award	Oh My Girl	Nominated	
Seoul Music Awards	2020	Popularity Award	Oh My Girl	Nominated	
Seoul Music Awards	2020	Hallyu Special Award	Oh My Girl	Nominated	
Seoul Music Awards	2020	QQ Music Most Popular K-Pop Artist Award	Oh My Girl	Nominated	
Seoul Music Awards	2021	Bonsang Award	Oh My Girl	Won	
Seoul Music Awards	2022	Bonsang Award	Oh My Girl	Won	
Seoul Music Awards	2022	K-wave Popularity Award	Oh My Girl	Nominated	
Seoul Music Awards	2022	Popularity Award	Oh My Girl	Nominated	
Seoul Music Awards	2022	U+Idol Live Best Artist Award	Oh My Girl	Nominated	
Soompi Awards	2018	Best MC	Oh My Girl	Won	
Soribada Best K-Music Awards	2018	Bonsang Award	Oh My Girl	Nominated	
Soribada Best K-Music Awards	2018	Popularity Award (Female)	Oh My Girl	Nominated	
Soribada Best K-Music Awards	2018	Global Fandom Award	Oh My Girl	Nominated	
Soribada Best K-Music Awards	2019	Bonsang Award	Oh My Girl	Nominated	
Soribada Best K-Music Awards	2019	New Korean Wave Icon Award	Oh My Girl	Won	
Soribada Best K-Music Awards	2019	Popularity Award (Female)	Oh My Girl	Nominated	
Soribada Best K-Music Awards	2020	Bonsang Award	Oh My Girl	Won	

== Other accolades ==
=== State and cultural honors ===
Name of country, year given, and name of honor or award
Country	Year	Honor or Award	Ref.
South Korea (Note: Honors are given at the Korean Popular Culture and Arts Awards, arranged by the Korea Creative Content Agency and hosted by the Ministry of Culture, Sports and Tourism. They are awarded to those who have contributed to the arts and South Korea's pop culture.)	2021	Minister of Culture, Sports and Tourism Commendation	
Newsis K-Expo Cultural Awards (Note: Co-sponsored by Korea’s Ministry of Culture, Sports and Tourism, Ministry of Trade, Industry, and Energy, Korea Communications Commission, and Korea Creative Content Agency, it awards cultural icons and businesses who have contributed greatly to Hallyu, the Korean wave.)	2021	National Assembly Culture, Sports and Tourism Committee Chairman Award	
