= Hyojung =

South Korean singer (born 1994)

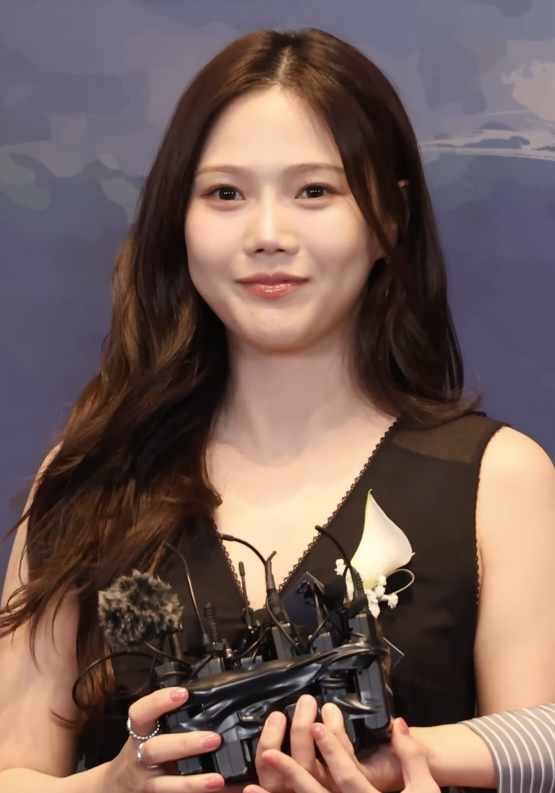
- Hyojung in January 2026
- Born: Choi Hyo-jung; July 28, 1994 (age 32); Anyang, Gyeonggi Province, South Korea
- Occupation: Singer
- Musical career
- Genre: K-pop
- Instrument: Vocals
- Years active: 2015–present
- Labels: WM; DSP
- Member of: Oh My Girl; Oh My Girl Banhana

Korean name
- Hangul: 최효정
- Hanja: 崔效定
- RR: Choe Hyojeong
- MR: Ch'oe Hyojŏng

Choi Hyo-jung (Korean: 최효정; born on July 28, 1994), better known mononymously as Hyojung is a South Korean singer. She is the leader of the South Korean girl group Oh My Girl.

== Early life ==
Hyojung was born on July 28, 1994, in Anyang, Gyeonggi Province, South Korea.

== Career ==
=== 2015–2018: Debut with Oh My Girl & other activities ===
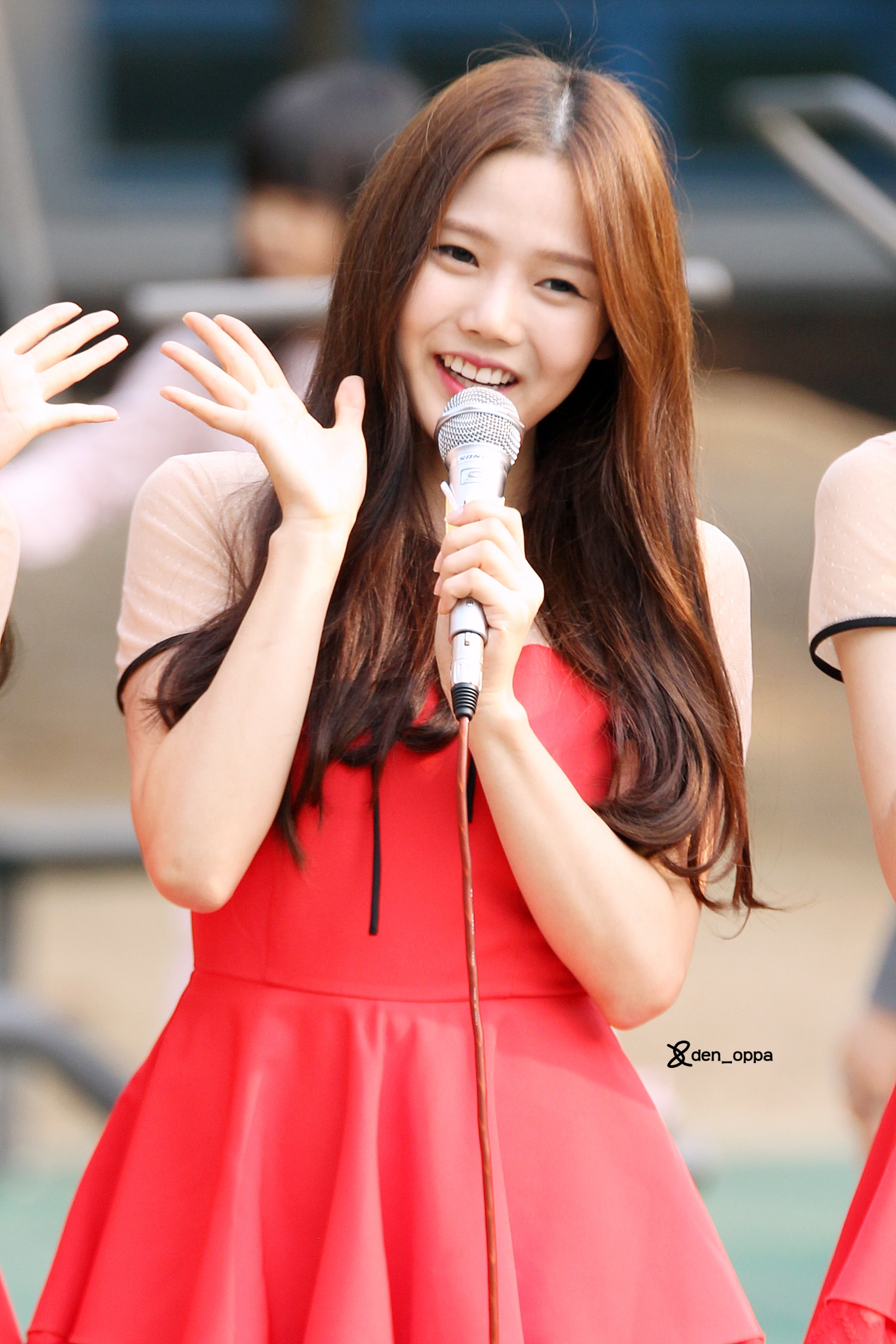
Hyojung in 2015

On April 20, 2015, Hyojung made her debut as a member of Oh My Girl with their first extended play, Oh My Girl.

In February 2017, she competed on King of Mask Singer under the name "Moon," appearing in episode 98.

In April 2018, alongside Arin and Binnie, she debuted in Oh My Girl's first sub-unit, Oh My Girl Banhana.

=== 2019–present: Solo activities ===
In August 2019, it was confirmed that Hyojung would be taking part in Queendom. She also started running her YouTube channel "JJung2eonni" since May 28 of the same year.

In January 2020, she became a DJ for Naver Now's "Avenger Girls".

In September 2020, she was announced to be a host for OnStyle's Get It Beauty.

Hyojung participated in the OST for SBS' Hyena with "Today, Just Like Yesterday (오늘도 어제처럼)", released on March 21, 2020.

On February 22, 2021, Hyojung was chosen by Walt Disney Company Korea to sing the Korean version of "Lead The Way" for Disney's animated film, Raya and the Last Dragon.

In August 2026, because of RBW's restructuring, Hyojung was transferred from WM Entertainment to DSP Media.

== Discography ==
=== Singles ===
List of singles as lead artist, showing year released, selected chart positions, and album name
Title	Year	Peak chart positions	Album
Title	Year	KOR Gaon	Album
"Suddenly Autumn (느새 가을) (feat. Crucial Star)	2016	—	Fantastic OST Part 3
"SARR" (사르르)	2018	—	Queen of Mystery 2 OST Part 1
"I'm Loving You" (사랑하고 있습니다)	2018	—	My Only One OST Part 5
"SNS" (with Park Myung-soo)	2018	—	Non-album single
"Mr. Wonder" (feat. Binnie)	2019	—	Legal High OST Part 5
"Today, Just Like Yesterday" (오늘도 어제처럼)	2020	—	Hyena OST Part 8
"Lead the Way" (Korean ver.)	2021	—	Raya and the Last Dragon
"Dear, Beloved"	2022	—	Dear X Who Doesn't Love Me OST
"Christmas Night Train"	2024	TBA	Non-album single
"To My Little Youth"	2026	—	Purple Note
"—" denotes releases that did not chart or were not released in that region.

=== Composition credits ===
All song credits are adapted from the Korea Music Copyright Association's database, unless otherwise noted.

Title	Year	Artist	Album	Notes
"SNS"	2018	Choi Hyo-jung, Park Myung-soo	Non-album single	As lyricist and composer
"굿모닝 FM CM 로고송"	2018	Choi Hyo-jung	Non-album single	As lyricist and composer
"내꼬해(CM VER.)"	2018	Choi Hyo-jung	Non-album single	As lyricist and composer
"Star Night Logo Song" (별밤로고송)	2018	Oh My Girl	Non-album single	As lyricist and composer
"Yum yum song" (얌얌송)	2020	Choi Hyo-jung	Non-album single	As lyricist and composer
"Ottoke Song" (오또케송)	2020	Choi Hyo-jung	Non-album single	As lyricist and composer

== Filmography ==
=== Television shows ===
Year	Title	Role	Notes	Ref.
2017	King of Masked Singer	Contestant as "Moon"	Episode 98	
2017	I Can See Your Voice	Detective		
2019	Queendom	Herself		
2020	Mr. Trot	Master		
2020	Oh! My Part, You	Panelist		
2020–present	Landman Village	Cast member		
2021	Get It Beauty 2021	Main host	With Sunmi	
2021	Tomorrow's National Singer	Judge		
2022	One Tree Table	Cast Member		
2022	Round Table	Contestant	Chuseok Special	
2022	Kilimanjaro	Cast Member	with Yoon Eun-hye, Uee, and Son Ho-jun	

=== Web shows ===
Year	Title	Role	Notes	Ref.
2020	Avengirls	Monday Host		
2023	Fill in the Next Blank	Main Cast	Documentary 4episode	

=== Radio shows ===
Year	Title	Role	Notes	Ref.
2022	Dream	Special DJ	February 21 to March 6	
