= Listen to My Word =

Single album by Oh My Girl
- Released: August 1, 2016
- Studio: Bono Studio; Studio ARK; Seoul Studio; Mojo Sound; doobdoob Studio
- Genre: K-pop
- Length: 15:08
- Language: Korean
- Label: WM Entertainment
- Producer: Lee Won-min; 72; Moon Jung-kyu

Oh My Girl chronology
Windy Day (2016)	Listen to My Word (2016)	Coloring Book (2017)

Singles from Listen to My Word
- 1. "Listen to My Word (A-ing)" Released: August 1, 2016

Listen to My Word (Korean: 내 얘길 들어봐; RR: Nae yaegil deureobwa) is the first single album by South Korean girl group Oh My Girl. It was released by WM Entertainment on August 1, 2016, distributed by LOEN Entertainment. The album contains four covers of classic K-pop songs, including Papaya's "Listen to My Word (A-ing)" featuring reggae duo Skull and Haha. This is the final release featuring member JinE, as she shortly ceased activities during the promotion to recover and receive treatment.

== Release and promotion ==
On July 15, 2016, Oh My Girl's agency WM Entertainment announced that the group would be releasing a special summer album in August. On July 31, Oh My Girl introduced the album through a live broadcast on Naver's V app, singing a medley of all four songs on the album. The digital album was released on August 1, along with a music video for the title track, "Listen to My Word (A-ing)". The CD version of the album was released on August 4.

== Composition ==
All four songs on the album are covers of classic K-pop songs, re-arranged to have a more contemporary sound. The title track, "Listen to My Word (A-ing)", is a cover of the hit song by girl group Papaya, originally released in 2000. It features reggae duo Skull and Haha and has reggae influences and a hip hop beat. "Midsummer Night's Christmas", originally released in 1990 by Lee Jung-hyun, has a piano melody and bossa nova drum rhythms. "Je T'aime" was originally released by Hey in 2001, and has modern rock influences. "Lies You Can See" was originally released by Kim Hyun-chul in 1998, and is in the Philly soul genre. All four songs feature a new rap written by Mimi.

== Chart performance ==
The album debuted at the top of the Gaon Album Chart for July 31 – August 6, 2016. The title track charted at number 15 on the Gaon Digital Chart that same week.

== Track listing ==
No.	Title	Lyrics	Music	Arrangement	Length
1.	"Listen to My Word (A-ing)" (내 얘길 들어봐(A-ing); Nae yaegil deureobwa (A-ing); featuring Skull and Haha)	Lee Yong-min; Mimi	Hwang Se-jun	72; David Anthony	3:31
2.	"Midsummer Night's Christmas" (한여름의 크리스마스; Hannyeoreumui keuriseumaseu)	Lee Jung-hyun; Mimi	Lee Jung-hyun	Lee Beom-seok	3:54
3.	"Je T'aime"	Lee Do-yeon; Mimi	Yoo Jung-yeon	Ruvin	3:48
4.	"Lies You Can See" (거짓말도 보여요; Geojinmaldo boyeoyo)	Kim Hyun-chul; Mimi	Yoo Jung-yeon	Moon Jung-kyu	3:58
Total length:					15:08

== Personnel ==
Credits adapted from EP liner notes.

Locations

- Recorded at Bono Studio ("Listen to My Word (A-ing)", "Christmas in Summer", "Je T'aime")
- Recorded at Studio ARK ("Christmas in Summer")
- Recorded at Seoul Studio ("Christmas in Summer", "Je T'aime")
- Recorded at Mojo Sound ("Christmas in Summer", "Je T'aime")
- Recorded at doobdoob Studio ("I Can See Your Lies")
- Edited at Bono Studio ("Listen to My Word (A-ing)", "Je T'aime")
- Edited at W Sound ("Christmas in Summer", "I Can See Your Lies")
- Mixed at W Sound ("Christmas in Summer", "I Can See Your Lies")
- Mixed at Bono Studio ("Listen to My Word (A-ing)", "Je T'aime")
- Mastered at JFS Mastering

Personnel

- Oh My Girl – vocals
- WM Entertainment Inc. – executive producer
- Lee Won-min – producer
- Kim Jin-mi – executive director
- 72 – music producer
- Moon Jung-kyu – music producer
- Seon Yeong – recording engineer
- Lee Ji-hong – recording engineer
- Jo Jeong-hyun – recording engineer
- Go Seung-wook – mixing engineer
- Jo Joon-seong – mixing engineer
- Kwon Nam-woo – mastering engineer
- Soulme – choreography director
- Segaji Video – music video director
- Jo Dae-young – art direction and design
- AHMI – art direction and design
- No Yoon-A – art direction and design
- Shin Hye-rim – photographer
- David Anthony – keyboard, guitar, bass guitar, drum programming (on "Listen to My Word (A-ing)")
- Kim Hyun-A – background vocals (on "Listen to My Word (A-ing)", "Je T'aime")
- Park Eun-woo – background vocals (on "Listen to My Word (A-ing)")
- 72 – vocal director (on "Listen to My Word (A-ing)", "Christmas in Summer")
- Moon Jung-kyu – vocal director (on "Listen to My Word (A-ing)", "Je T'aime", "I Can See Your Lies"), keyboard (on "I Can See Your Lies"), drum programming (on "I Can See Your Lies")
- Seon Yeong – recording engineer (on "Listen to My Word (A-ing)", "Christmas in Summer", "Je T'aime"), digital editor (on "Listen to My Word (A-ing)", "Je T'aime"), mix assistant (on "Listen to My Word (A-ing)", "Je T'aime")
- Go Seung-wook – mix engineer (on "Listen to My Word (A-ing)", "Je T'aime")
- Kwon Nam-woo – mastering engineer (on "Listen to My Word (A-ing)", "Christmas in Summer", "Je T'aime", "I Can See Your Lies")
- Jeon Yeong-ho – piano (on "Christmas in Summer")
- Jeong Jae-pil – guitar (on "Christmas in Summer", "I Can See Your Lies")
- Lee Beom-suk – bass guitar (on "Christmas in Summer", "Je T'aime", "I Can See Your Lies"), vocal director (on "Christmas in Summer")
- Park Eun-chan – drum programming (on "Christmas in Summer", "Je T'aime")
- Go Min-ae – background vocal (on "Christmas in Summer")
- Jo Jeong-hyun – recording engineer (on "Christmas in Summer")
- Jeong Ki-hong – recording engineer (on "Christmas in Summer", "Je T'aime")
- Ji Yeong-ju – recording assistant (on "Christmas in Summer", "Je T'aime")
- Kim Gap-su – recording engineer (on "Christmas in Summer", "Je T'aime")
- Song Hye-jin – recording assistant (on "Christmas in Summer", "Je T'aime")
- Heo Eun-sook – digital editor (on "Christmas in Summer", "I Can See Your Lies"), mix assistant (on "Christmas in Summer", "I Can See Your Lies")
- Choi Ja-yeon – mix assistant (on "Christmas in Summer", "I Can See Your Lies")
- Jo Joon-seong – mixing engineer (on "Christmas in Summer", "I Can See Your Lies")
- Jeon Yeong-ho – piano (on "Je T'aime")
- Ruvin – guitar, background vocals, vocal director (on "Je T'aime")
- Lee Mi-ji – background vocals (on "Je T'aime")
- Kang Tae-woo – background vocals (on "I Can See Your Lies")
- Lee Ji-hong – recording engineer (on "I Can See Your Lies")

== Charts ==
Chart (2016)	Peak position
South Korean Albums (Gaon)	1
