= Pink Ocean =

EP by Oh My Girl
- Released: March 28, 2016
- Studios: Doobdoob; W Sound
- Genre: K-pop
- Length: 18:14
- Language: Korean
- Label: WM
- Producers: Lee Won-min; 72; Moon Jung-kyu

Oh My Girl chronology
Closer (2015)	Pink Ocean (2016)	Listen to My Word (2016)

Singles from Pink Ocean
- 1. "Step by Step" Released: March 21, 2016; 2. "Liar Liar" Released: March 28, 2016

Windy Day reissue cover

Pink Ocean is the third extended play (EP) by South Korean girl group Oh My Girl. It was released by WM Entertainment on March 28, 2016 and distributed by LOEN Entertainment. The album contains five songs, including the singles "Step by Step" and "Liar Liar". Oh My Girl promoted the album with a series of televised live performances on South Korea's music shows.

A reissue titled Windy Day, featuring the single of the same name, was released on May 26, 2016.

== Background and release ==
Promotion for Oh My Girl's second EP, Closer, ended in November 2015, and the group began preparing for their next album soon afterwards. On December 9, they flew to Los Angeles for the album cover photoshoot and a promotional event. However, they were denied entry by customs officials because they did not disclose the true purpose of their trip and tried to enter the US as tourists under the visa waiver program, rather than obtaining the required performance visas.

On March 17, 2016, WM Entertainment announced that Oh My Girl would be releasing their third EP (also called a mini album). "Step by Step" was pre-released on March 21, and the album's title, Pink Ocean, and track list were revealed the next day. The album was released the following week on March 28, in both CD and digital format. A music video for lead single "Liar Liar" was released that same day.

On May 18, WM Entertainment announced that the album would be re-released on May 26 with three new tracks: "Windy Day", "Stupid in Love", and a Chinese version of "Liar Liar".

== Production and composition ==
The music for "B612" was co-written by North American songwriters Sean Alexander and Darren Smith, who co-wrote Girls' Generation's "Lion Heart", as well as many of Oh My Girl's previous songs. Swedish songwriter and guitarist Andreas Öberg co-wrote "B612" and "Knock Knock" and English songwriter David Anthony co-wrote "Liar Liar" and "I Found Love". Seo Ji-eum of Jam Factory wrote the Korean lyrics for the first three songs on the album, and Oh My Girl member Mimi wrote the rap lyrics, with the rap in "Liar Liar" being inspired by Pinocchio. "Step by Step" was written by Jung Jin-young, a member of WM Entertainment's boy band B1A4.

"Liar Liar"
"Liar Liar" is a dance-pop song with a hip hop drum beat.

"Liar Liar" is a dance-pop song with a hip hop drum beat. In the lyrics, the narrator is a girl who has a secret crush on a guy, but feels like she is "somewhere in between a dream and reality" because she is uncertain that her affection is returned. "B612" is a mid-tempo acoustic ballad inspired by The Little Prince—the prince's home planet is Asteroid B-612, and the song's lyrics compare the narrator and her crush to the rose and the prince. "I Found Love" is an R&B song with a strong drum rhythm, and is about a girl attending school and falling in love. "Knock Knock" is a retro-pop song about friendship. "Step by Step" was described as having a "dreamy" atmosphere and has rock-style rhythm with string instrumentation.

The vividly-colored music video for "Liar Liar" was produced by Digipedi and highlights the contrast between dreams and reality. In the story line, the girls are all in love with the same guy, but are hiding it from each other. It includes scenes shot underwater, a first for the group. In the dance version music video, they wear shoes that resemble roller skates.

The lead single of the album reissue, "Windy Day", is a folk-pop song composed by Öberg and Swedish producer Maria Marcus. It features vocal harmonies, acoustic guitar, and Middle Eastern-inspired horns. The lyrics, written by Seo and Mimi, express the complicated emotions of a girl's heart. The accompanying music video was filmed in Jeju Island in various outdoor settings, including a hedge maze and a forest. Like the music video for "Closer", it has a fairy tale and fantasy-inspired theme.

== Promotion ==
On March 28, Oh My Girl held a comeback showcase at the Lotte Card Center in the Mecenatpolis Mall, Hapjeong-dong, Seoul. They performed songs from the album for the first time at the showcase. The group then promoted the album with performances of "Liar Liar" on various music shows, starting with M! Countdown on March 31. After the pre-recording for Show! Music Core on April 16, member Seunghee fainted and was hospitalized. Doctors determined she had hyperventilated due to stress, and she took a few days off to rest, before resuming activities with the group on April 21. On May 5, they began performing "Step by Step" on music shows. They concluded promotions for the album on May 8 with a final performance on Inkigayo. On May 26, promotion for the album reissue began with a performance of "Windy Day" on M! Countdown.

== Reception ==
=== Pink Ocean ===
Pink Ocean entered the weekly Gaon Album Chart at number 5, selling 6,482 physical copies in three days. "Liar Liar" was number 58 on the Gaon Digital Chart for the week of March 27, and "Step by Step" was number 79 the previous week. "Liar Liar" also charted at number 9 on the Billboard World Digital Songs chart.

Jeff Benjamin of Fuse, who previously identified Oh My Girl as one of the best rookie acts of 2015, said "Liar Liar" was a unique blend of an "adorable aesthetic" and a "sassy attitude". He noted the song's "punchy" pop production and "addictive" hook, and identified "Knock Knock" and "Step by Step" as the album's standouts. He also praised Oh My Girl's stage performance and intricate choreography. Dazed magazine's Taylor Glasby ranked "Liar Liar" number 7 in Dazed's "The 20 best K-Pop tracks of the year", describing "Liar Liar" as an upbeat falsetto powerhouse that was skillfully connected with the music video.

=== Windy Day ===
Windy Day entered the Gaon Album Chart at number 4, selling 10,574 units in six days, while the song of the same name charted at number 62 on the digital chart.

In June, Benjamin included "Windy Day" in Fuse's list of "The 13 Best Girl Group Songs of 2016 (So Far)", calling it one of the most unexpected girl group releases in 2016. Billboard magazine's Tamar Herman called "Windy Day" experimental and quirky, and said it showcased the members youthful vocals.

== Track listing ==
=== Pink Ocean ===
– South Korea standard edition
No.	Title	Lyrics	Music	Arrangement	Length
1.	"Liar Liar"	Seo Ji-eum; Mimi	David Anthony; Sophie White; Joe Killington	Anthony	3:14
2.	"B612"	Seo; Mimi	Andreas Öberg; Xin Xin Gao; Darren "Baby Dee Beats" Smith; Sean Alexander (Note: Sean Alexander is also credited under his solo project name, Avenue 52.)	Öberg; Smith; Avenue 52	4:06
3.	"I Found Love"	Seo; Mimi	Anthony; White; Phoebe Brown	Anthony	3:34
4.	"Knock Knock"	72	Öberg; Pär Almqvist; August Vinberg	Almqvist; Vinberg	3:37
5.	"Step by Step" (Korean: 한 발짝 두 발짝; RR: Han baljjak du baljjak; lit. '"One Step Two Steps"')	Jung Jin-young	Jung Jin-young	Jung Jin-young; Command Freaks (Note: Command Freaks is a music producer and songwriting team made up of Maxx Song and Ann Sung-chan, under Iconic Sounds.)	3:43
Total length:					18:14

– International standard edition
No.	Title	Lyrics	Music	Arrangement	Length
6.	"Liar Liar" (Chinese version)	Seo; Mimi; Tina Wang; Bang Soo-kyung	Anthony; White; Killington	Anthony	3:14
Total length:					21:28

=== Windy Day ===
No.	Title	Lyrics	Music	Arrangement	Length
1.	"Windy Day"	Seo Ji-eum; Mimi	Maria Marcus; Andreas Öberg	Marcus	4:09
2.	"Stupid in Love"	Junebug	Darren "Baby Dee Beats" Smith; Evan Haymond; Tammy Infusino	Smith	3:37
3.	"Liar Liar" (Korean version)	Seo; Mimi	David Anthony; Sophie White; Joe Killington	Anthony	3:14
4.	"B612"	Seo; Mimi	Öberg; Xin Xin Gao; Smith; Sean Alexander	Öberg; Smith; Avenue 52	4:06
5.	"I Found Love"	Seo; Mimi	Anthony; White; Phoebe Brown	Anthony	3:34
6.	"Knock Knock"	72	Öberg; Pär Almqvist; August Vinberg	Almqvist; Vinberg	3:37
7.	"Step by Step" (한 발짝 두 발짝)	Jung Jin-young	Jung Jin-young	Jung Jin-young; Command Freaks	3:43
8.	"Liar Liar" (Chinese version)	Seo; Mimi; Tina Wang; Bang Soo-kyung	Anthony; White; Killington	Anthony	3:14
Total length:					29:14

== Personnel ==
Credits adapted from EP liner notes.

=== Pink Ocean ===
Locations

- Recorded at Doobdoob Studio ("Liar Liar", "Step by Step")
- Recorded at W Sound ("B612", I Found Love", "Knock Knock")
- Edited at Doobdoob Studio ("B612", "I Found Love")
- Mixed at W Sound ("B612", "I Found Love", "Knock Knock")
- Mixed at Bono Studio ("I Found Love")
- Mastered at JFS Mastering

Personnel

- Oh My Girl – vocals, background vocals (on "Liar Liar", "Step by Step")
- WM Entertainment Inc. – executive producer
- Lee Won-min – producer
- Kim Jin-mi – executive director
- Moon Jung-kyu – music producer
- 72 – music producer
- Maxx Song – vocal director, recording engineer
- Jo Joon-seong – mixing engineer
- Go Seung-wook – mixing engineer
- Kwon Nam-woo – mastering engineer
- Soulme – choreography director
- Digipedi – music video director
- Jo Dae-young – art direction and design
- AHMI – art direction and design
- Choi Dae-young – photographer
- David Anthony – guitar, bass guitar, drum programming (on "Liar Liar", "I Found Love")
- Maxx Song – vocal director (on "Liar Liar", "Step by Step"), guitar, recording engineer (on "Step by Step")
- Lee Ji-hong – digital editor (on "Liar Liar", "I Found Love", "Step by Step")
- Heo Eun-sook – digital editor (on "B612", "Knock Knock"), mix assistant (on "Liar Liar", B612", "Knock Knock", "Step by Step")
- Choi Ja-yeon – mix assistant (on "Liar Liar", "B612", "Step by Step"), recording engineer (on "I Found Love", "Knock Knock")
- Jo Joon-seong – mix engineer (on "Liar Liar", "B612", "Step by Step")
- Kwon Nam-woo – mastering engineer (on "Liar Liar", "B612", "I Found Love", "Knock Knock", "Step by Step")
- Darren Smith – keyboard, bass guitar, drum programming (on "B612")
- Andreas Öberg – keyboard (on "B612"), guitar (on "B612", "Knock Knock"), bass guitar (on "B612", "Knock Knock")
- Park Eun-woo – background vocals (on "B612", "I Found Love", "Knock Knock")
- 72 – vocal director (on "B612", "I Found Love", "Knock Knock")
- Moon Jung-kyu – vocal director (on "B612", "I Found Love", "Knock Knock")
- Seon Yeong – mix assistant (on "I Found Love")
- Go Seung-wook – mix engineer (on "I Found Love", "Knock Knock")
- Pär Almqvist – keyboard, drum programming (on "Knock Knock")
- August Vinberg – keyboard, drum programming (on "Knock Knock")
- Ahn Sung-chan – keyboard (on "Step by Step")
- Pae Su-jung – background vocals (on "Step by Step")

=== Windy Day ===
Locations

- Recorded at Doobdoob Studio ("Windy Day", "Stupid in Love", "Liar Liar", "Step by Step", "Liar Liar (Chinese version)")
- Recorded at W Sound ("Windy Day", "B612", I Found Love", "Knock Knock")
- Edited at Doobdoob Studio ("Windy Day", "B612", "I Found Love")
- Mixed at W Sound ("Windy Day", "B612", "I Found Love", "Knock Knock", "Liar Liar (Chinese version)")
- Mixed at Bono Studio ("Stupid in Love", "I Found Love")
- Mastered at JFS Mastering

Personnel

- Oh My Girl – vocals, background vocals (on "Liar Liar", "Step by Step")
- WM Entertainment Inc. – executive producer
- Lee Won-min – producer
- Kim Jin-mi – executive director
- Moon Jung-kyu – music producer
- 72 – music producer
- Maxx Song – recording engineer
- Chang Woo-young – recording engineer
- Lee Ji-hong – recording engineer
- Heo Eun-sook – recording engineer
- Choi Ja-yeon – recording engineer
- Jo Joon-seong – mixing engineer
- Kwon Nam-woo – mastering engineer
- Soulme – choreography director
- Digipedi – music video director
- Jo Dae-young – art direction and design
- AHMI – art direction and design
- JDZ Chung – photographer
- Maria Marcus – keyboard (on "Windy Day", "B612"), guitar (on "B612", "Knock Knock"), bass guitar (on "B612", "Knock Knock"), drum programming (on "Windy Day")
- Andreas Öberg – guitar, bass guitar (on "Windy Day")
- Hyun Seunghee (Oh My Girl) – background vocals (on "Windy Day", "Stupid in Love", "Liar Liar (Chinese version)")
- Sinnara – background vocals (on "Windy Day")
- Park Eun-woo – background vocals (on "B612", "I Found Love", "Knock Knock")
- Pea Su-jung – background vocals (on "Step by Step")
- Maxx Song – vocal director (on "Windy Day", "Liar Liar", "Step by Step", recording engineer (on "Windy Day", "Step by Step"), digital editor (on "Windy Day"), guitar (on "Step by Step")
- Lee Ji-hong – digital editor (on "Windy Day", "Stupid in Love", "Liar Liar", "I Found Love", "Step by Step", "Liar Liar (Chinese version)"), recording engineer (on "Stupid In Love", "Liar Liar (Chinese version)")
- Heo Eun-sook – digital editor (on "B612", "Knock Knock"), mix assistant (on "Windy Day", "Liar Liar", "B612", "Knock Knock", "Step by Step", "Liar Liar (Chinese version)")
- Choi Ja-yeon – mix assistant (on "Windy Day", "Liar Liar", "B612", "Step by Step", "Liar Liar (Chinese version)"), recording engineer (on "I Found Love", "Knock Knock")
- Jo Joon-seong – mixing engineer (on "Windy Day", "Liar Liar", "B612", "Step by Step", "Liar Liar (Chinese version)")
- Kwon Nam-woo – mastering engineer (on "Windy Day", "Stupid in Love", "Liar Liar", "B612", "I Found Love", "Knock Knock", "Step by Step", "Liar Liar (Chinese version)")
- Darren Smith – keyboard, bass guitar, drum programming (on "Stupid in Love", "B612")
- Pär Almqvist – keyboard, drum programming (on "Knock Knock")
- August Vinberg – keyboard, drum programming (on "Knock Knock")
- Ahn Sung-chan - keyboard (on "Step by Step")
- Evan Haymond – guitar (on "Stupid In Love")
- 72 – vocal director (on "Stupid In Love", "B612", "I Found Love", "Knock Knock")
- Moon Jung-kyu – vocal director (on "Stupid In Love", "B612", "I Found Love", "Knock Knock")
- Chang Woo-young – recording engineer (on "Stupid In Love", "Liar Liar (Chinese version)"), digital editor (on "Liar Liar (Chinese version)")
- Seon Yeong – mix assistant (on "Stupid In Love", "I Found Love")
- Go Seung-wook – mixing engineer (on "Stupid In Love", "I Found Love", "Knock Knock")
- David Anthony – guitar, bass guitar, drum programming (on "Liar Liar", "I Found Love", "Liar Liar (Chinese version)"), keyboard (on "Liar Liar (Chinese version)")
- T.M – background vocals, vocal director (on "Liar Liar (Chinese version)")

== Charts ==
=== Pink Ocean ===
Chart (2016)	Peak position
South Korean Albums (Gaon)	5

=== Windy Day ===
Chart (2016)	Peak position
South Korean Albums (Gaon)	4

== Release history ==
Album	Date	Format	Label
Pink Ocean	March 28, 2016	CD, digital download	WM Entertainment, LOEN Entertainment (distributor)
Windy Day	May 26, 2016	Digital download	WM Entertainment, LOEN Entertainment (distributor)
Windy Day	May 31, 2016	CD	WM Entertainment, LOEN Entertainment (distributor)
