= Real Love (Oh My Girl album) =

- Digital and Love Bouquet version cover

Studio album by Oh My Girl
- Released: March 28, 2022
- Length: 32:17
- Language: Korean
- Labels: WM; Sony Music Korea

Oh My Girl chronology
Dear OhMyGirl (2021)	Real Love (2022)	Golden Hourglass (2023)

Singles from Real Love
- 1. "Real Love" Released: March 28, 2022

Real Love is the second Korean-language studio album (fifth overall) by South Korean girl group Oh My Girl. It was released on March 28, 2022, by WM Entertainment, about eleven months after the latest EP, Dear OhMyGirl (2021), The album consists of ten tracks, including the lead single of the same name. In South Korea, Real Love debuted at number five on the Gaon Album Chart, and has sold 96,880 copies as of April. It was the group's last album to feature former group member Jiho, who left the group in May 2022.

== Track listing ==
Real Love track listing
No.	Title	Lyrics	Music	Arrangement	Length
1.	"Real Love"	Seo Ji-eum	Ryan Jhun; Josh Cumbee; Afshin Salmani; Ilan Kidron; Nat Dunn	Jhun; Afsheen; Cumbee	3:21
2.	"Drip"	Seo Jung-ah	Steven Lee; Andreas Stone Johansson; Laurell Barker; Sebastian Thott	Thott	3:28
3.	"Eden"	Seo Jung-ah	Jhun; Lauritz Emil Christiansen; Celine Svanbäck; Zophia Mikkelsen; Jeppe London Bilsby	Jhun; Bilsby; Christiansen	3:01
4.	"Replay"	Seo Ji-eum	Jhun; Ramus Budny; Albin Tengblad; Kristin Carpenter	Jhun; Budny; Tengblad	2:31
5.	"Parachute"	Seo Jung-ah	Jhun; Raphaella Christina Aristocleous; Simon Gitsels; Florian Jahrstorfer	Jhun; Jason OK	2:34
6.	"Kiss & Fix"	Seo Ji-eum	Jhun; Louise Lennartsson; Svanbäck; Bilsby; Christiansen	Jhun; Christiansen; Bilsby	3:08
7.	"Blink"	Seo Ji-eum	Jhun; Rodney "Darkchild" Jerkins; Rickey "Slikk Muzik" Offord; Dreyfus Lindsey; J. Hart; Julie Frost; Ericka Coulter	Jhun; Jerkins; Offord; Lindsey	3:15
8.	"Dear Rose"	Seo Ji-eum	Jhun; Michel "Lindgren" Schulz; Melanie Joy Fontana	Jhun; Schulz	3:59
9.	"Sailing Heart" (항해)	Lee Joo-hyoung (MonoTree)	Lee; Krysta Youngs; Julia Ross	Lee	3:39
10.	"Real Love" (instrumental)		Jhun; Cumbee; Salmani; Kidron; Dunn	Jhun; Afsheen; Cumbee	3:21
Total length:					32:17

== Charts ==
=== Weekly charts ===
Weekly chart performance for Real Love
Chart (2022)	Peak position
Japanese Albums (Oricon)	41
South Korean Albums (Gaon)	5

=== Monthly charts ===
Monthly chart performance for Real Love
Chart (2022)	Peak position
South Korean Albums (Gaon)	16
