= Coloring Book (Oh My Girl EP) =

- Digital cover

EP by Oh My Girl
- Released: 3 April 2017
- Recorded: doobdoob Studio; Vibe Studio; W Sound; Koko Sound Studio; Bono Studio; 2016
- Studio: WM Studios
- Genre: K-pop
- Length: 15:48
- Language: Korean
- Label: WM Entertainment
- Producer: Lee Won-min; 72; Moon Jeong-gyu

Oh My Girl chronology
Listen to My Word (2016)	Coloring Book (2017)	Secret Garden (2018)

Singles from Coloring Book
- 1. "Coloring Book" Released: 3 April 2017

Coloring Book (Korean: 컬러링북) is the fourth extended play (EP) by South Korean girl group Oh My Girl. It was released by WM Entertainment on 3 April 2017, distributed by LOEN Entertainment. The album contains five songs, including the single "Coloring Book". JinE did not participate in this album as she continued to recover and receive treatment before her departure from the group.

== Background ==
On March 13, WM Entertainment announced on Oh My Girl's fancafe that their next album is scheduled to be released in April. JinE will not be taking part in upcoming album promotions and activities in favor of continued treatment and recovery. WM has also stated that JinE's health has improved since last year, and WM is focusing on long-term treatment for JinE.

A teaser of a mini-album and their scheduled date was released on April 3, 2017 alongside the accompanying music video.

== Release ==
The group started promoting on the single on various music shows.

== Track listing ==
No.	Title	Lyrics	Music	Arrangement	Length
1.	"Coloring Book" (컬러링북)	So Jung-ah	David Anthony; Valeria Del Prete; 72	David Anthony	3:05
2.	"Real World"	Seo Ji-eum; Mayu Wakisaka	Sean Alexander (Note: Sean Alexander is also credited under his solo project name, Avenue 52.); Mayu Wakisaka	Avenue 52	3:20
3.	"Agit"	Seo Ji-eum	Darren Smith; Andreas Öberg; Michele Angel Wylen; Sean Alexander	Darren "Baby Dee Beats" Smith; Andreas Öberg; Avenue 52	2:58
4.	"In My Dreams"	eMpty	Darren Smith; Andreas Öberg; Bo Riley; Sean Alexander	Darren "Baby Dee Beats" Smith; Andreas Öberg; Avenue 52	3:28
5.	"Perfect Day"	MaFly; KeyFly	Andreas Öberg; Svante Halldin; Jakob Hazell; Hugo Bjork; Michael Lerios; Demitri Lerios; SYMON	SeventyEight; Hugo Bjork	2:57
Total length:					15:48

== Personnel ==
Credits adapted from EP liner notes.

Locations

- Recorded at doobdoob Studio ("Coloring Book")
- Recorded at Vibe Studio ("Real World", "Agit", "Perfect Day")
- Recorded at W Sound ("In My Dreams")
- Edited at doobdoob Studio ("Coloring Book", "Real World", "Agit", "In My Dreams")
- Edited at W Sound ("Perfect Day")
- Mixed at W Sound ("Coloring Book", "In My Dreams", "Perfect Day")
- Mixed at Koko Sound Studio ("Real World")
- Mixed at Bono Studio ("Agit")
- Mastered at JFS Mastering

Personnel

- Oh My Girl – vocals
- WM Entertainment Inc. – executive producer
- Lee Won-min – producer
- Kim Jin-mi – executive director
- 72 – music producer
- Jang Woo-young – recording engineer
- Heo Eun-sook – recording engineer
- Choi Ja-yeon – recording engineer
- Jung Mo-yeon – recording engineer
- Maxx Song – recording engineer
- Jo Joon-seong – mixing engineer
- Go Seung-wook – mixing engineer
- Go Hyun-jung – mixing engineer
- Kwon Nam-woo – mastering engineer
- Soulme – choreography director
- Shin Hui-won – music video director
- Jo Dae-young – art direction and design
- Keema – art direction and design
- Seo Joon-gyo – photographer
- David Anthony – keyboard, guitar, bass guitar, drum programming, horn (on "Coloring Book")
- Kang Hyun-joo – background vocals (on "Coloring Book")
- Maxx Song – vocal director, recording engineer, digital editor (on "Coloring Book")
- Jang Woo-young – recording engineer (on "Real World"), digital editor (on "Coloring Book", "Real World", "Agit", "In My Dreams")
- Heo Eun-sook – mix assistant (on "Coloring Book", "In My Dreams", "Perfect Day"), digital editor (on "Perfect Day")
- Choi Ja-yeon – mix assistant (on "Coloring Book", "In My Dreams", "Perfect Day"), recording engineer (on "In My Dreams")
- Jo Joon-seong – mix engineer (on "Coloring Book", "In My Dreams", "Perfect Day")
- Kwon Nam-woo – mastering engineer (on "Coloring Book", "Real World", "Agit", "In My Dreams", "Perfect Day")
- Sean Alexander – keyboard (on "Real World", "In My Dreams"), guitar, bass guitar, drum programming (on "Real World"), additional programming (on "Agit")
- Park Eun-ooh – background vocals (on "Real World", "In My Dreams")
- 72 – vocal director (on "Real World", "Agit", "In My Dreams", "Perfect Day")
- Moon Jeong-gyu – vocal director (on "Real World", "Agit", "In My Dreams", "Perfect Day")
- Jeong Mo-yeon – recording engineer (on "Real World", "Agit", "Perfect Day")
- Go Hyun-jung – mixing engineer (on "Real World")
- Andreas Öberg – keyboard (on "Agit", "In My Dreams"), guitar (on "Agit", "In My Dreams", "Perfect Day")
- Darren Smith – keyboard, drum programming (on "Agit", "In My Dreams"), string arrangement (on "In My Dreams")
- Hyun Seunghee (Oh My Girl) – background vocals (on "Agit", "Perfect Day")
- Seon Young – mix assistant (on "Agit")
- Go Seung-wook – mixing engineer (on "Agit")
- SeventyEight – keyboard, bass guitar, drum programming, additional programming (on "Perfect Day")
- Hugo Bjork – keyboard, guitar, bass guitar, drum programming, additional programming (on "Perfect Day")
