= Bingle Bangle =

- Digital and Play version cover

EP by AOA
- Released: May 28, 2018
- Recorded: 2018
- Label: FNC

AOA chronology
Angel's Knock (2017)	Bingle Bangle (2018)	New Moon (2019)

Singles from Bingle Bangle
- 1. "Bingle Bangle" Released: May 28, 2018

Bingle Bangle (stylized in all caps) is the fifth extended play by South Korean girl group AOA. It was released on May 28, 2018 by FNC Entertainment and distributed by Kakao M. It contains a total of six songs, including the title track "Bingle Bangle". This is the only release as a six-member group, after Choa's departure in 2017, as well as the last release to feature member Mina, who left the group in May 2019.

== Background and release ==
On April 18, 2018, FNC Entertainment confirmed that AOA would be returning as a group of six in May 2018, making it their first comeback since Choa's departure in 2017. It was later confirmed that the group would be returning with their fifth mini album titled Bingle Bangle on May 28, 2018. On May 9, FNC Entertainment opened AOA's official instagram and began posting teasers for the comeback on May 10. Both individual and group teasers began to be released through their official instagram on May 10. The tracklist was released on May 22. On May 28, the mini album was officially released along with the title track's music video.

Member Jimin participated in writing the lyrics for the album.

== Promotion ==
AOA held a showcase on May 28 for the release of the mini album and performed their title track alongside "Super Duper".

They began performing the title track "Bingle Bangle" and "Super Duper" on South Korean music shows from May 31 on Mnet's M Countdown.

== Singles ==
"Bingle Bangle" was released as the title track in conjunction with the EP on May 28, 2018. The song was described as "a funky summer song with fresh and lively energy". "Bingle Bangle" reached number 4 on South Korea's Gaon Digital Chart and number 3 on the K-Pop Hot 100.

== Track listing ==
No.	Title	Lyrics	Music	Arrangements	Length
1.	"Bingle Bangle" (빙글뱅글)	Han Seong-ho; Kim Do-hoon; Lee Sang-ho; Jimin	Erik Nyholm; Krista Siegfrids; Kristofer Karisson; Kim Do-hoon; Lee Sang-ho	Erik Nyholm; Krista Siegfrids; Kristofer Karlsson	3:41
2.	"Super Duper"	Han Seong-ho; Jimin	Mats Tärnfors; Simon Jakobsson	Mats Tärnfors; Simon Jakobsson	3:25
3.	"Heat"	Lee Seul-gi; Jeong Joo-hee; Jimin	Ingrid Margrete Skretting; Ketil Schei	Ketil Schei	3:14
4.	"Ladi Dadi"	Jung Yong-hwa; Jimin	Katerina Bramley; Ketil Schei	Ketil Schei	3:22
5.	"파르페" (Parfait)	Seo Ji-eum; Jimin	Emile Ghantous; Stephen Daly; Keith Justin Hetrick; Mathieu Brunet; Melanie Joy Fontana; Michel Schulz; Ryan S. Jhun	Emile Ghantous; Stephen Daly; Keith Justin Hetrick	3:33
6.	"뚜뚜뚜" (Ddu Ddu Ddu)	Han Seong-ho; Jimin	David Amber; Devyn Rush	David Amber	3:16

== Charts ==
Chart (2018)	Peak position
South Korean Albums (Gaon)	3
US World Albums (Billboard)	10

== Release history ==
Region	Date	Format	Label
South Korea	May 28, 2018	Digital download	FNC Entertainment
Various	May 28, 2018	Digital download	FNC Entertainment
South Korea	May 29, 2018	CD	FNC Entertainment
