= New Moon (EP) =

EP by AOA
- Released: November 26, 2019
- Recorded: 2019
- Genre: K-pop
- Length: 16:59
- Label: FNC

AOA chronology
Bingle Bangle (2018)	New Moon (2019)

Singles from New Moon
- 1. "Come See Me" Released: November 26, 2019

New Moon is the sixth extended play released by South Korean girl group AOA, released on November 26, 2019, by FNC Entertainment. It is the group's first and only album as five members following the departure of Mina, as well as the last album released with members Jimin, Yuna, and Seolhyun.

== Background information ==
On October 23, 2019, it was announced that AOA would be making a comeback in the fall after member Seolhyun posted photos from the group's MV shoot to Instagram on the same day. The album's announcement came during the group's participation on Queendom, where it was announced the group would be performing a new song called "Sorry", on the show's final broadcast on October 21.

Ahead of the album's release, AOA participated in a photoshoot and interview with Harper's Bazaar, where they mentioned how the album would be showing off new sides of the members not seen before.

On November 25, it was announced that the group's comeback showcase set for the following day had been cancelled as a result of Goo Hara's passing the day prior.

== Track listing ==
No.	Title	Length
1.	"Come See Me"	3:22
2.	"Sorry"	3:39
3.	"Magic Spell"	3:18
4.	"Ninety Nine"	3:27
5.	"My Way"	3:33
Total length:		16:59

== Charts ==
Chart (2019)	Peak position
South Korean Albums (Gaon)	3
