= Closer (Oh My Girl EP) =

EP by Oh My Girl
- Released: October 8, 2015
- Studio: Doobdoob Studio; W Sound
- Genre: K-pop; dream pop
- Length: 18:31
- Language: Korean
- Label: WM Entertainment
- Producer: Lee Won-min; 72; Moon Jeong-gyu

Oh My Girl chronology
Oh My Girl (2015)	Closer (2015)	Pink Ocean (2016)

Singles from Closer
- 1. "Closer" Released: October 8, 2015

Closer is the second extended play (EP) by South Korean girl group Oh My Girl. It was released by WM Entertainment on October 8, 2015 and was distributed by LOEN Entertainment. The album contains five songs, including the single of the same name. Oh My Girl promoted the album with a series of televised live performances of "Closer" on South Korea's music shows. "Closer" was positively received by several American music critics, making the K-pop top 20 year-end lists of Billboard and Noisey.

== Production and composition ==
"Closer"
"Closer" was written to have dreamlike qualities, as illustrated by the song's chorus.

The EP (also called a mini album) was produced by WM Entertainment's CEO Lee Won-min, with music produced by Choi Jae-hyuk (under the pen name 72) and Moon Jeong-gyu of the Key Artist Agency, a music publishing and production company based in Los Angeles. All five songs had music composed by songwriters associated with the agency, and three of the songs feature rap lyrics written by Oh My Girl member Mimi.

"Closer" was composed by Laura Brian and Sean Alexander, with Korean lyrics by Seo Ji-eum of Jam Factory. Alexander also co-wrote "Playground" and "Sugar Baby", and previously co-wrote three of the songs on Oh My Girl's self-titled debut album. Brian composed the chord progressions, melody, piano hook, and original English lyrics of "Closer", while Alexander did the arrangement. (Note: Sean Alexander is also credited under his solo project name, Avenue 52.) Brian wrote the song to have a "dreamy feel", beautiful and eerie at the same time. It was originally written with an R&B beat for the American song market, and Alexander changed the instrumental to be more upbeat before sending it to contacts at the Key Artist Agency. The song was subsequently purchased by WM Entertainment. Seo's lyrics were written to fit the mysterious and dreamlike feeling, and include cosmic imagery. The song is in the key of C-sharp minor with a tempo of 110 beats per minute.

"Say No More" is a retro-pop R&B song composed by Swedish songwriters Andreas Öberg, Pär Almqvist and August Vinberg. "Playground" is an uptempo pop song about a couple who break up and say goodbye to each other at a playground. "Sugar Baby" is retro-pop song with minor chord progressions and big band instrumentation. In the song's lyrics, the narrator compares her boyfriend to a teddy bear. The last track, "Round About", is an uptempo R&B song with a swing rhythm, composed by the Swedish songwriting team with Korean lyrics by Kim Eana.

The music video for "Closer" was produced by Yoo Sung-gyun of Sunny Visual, who also directed B1A4's "Solo Day" and "Sweet Girl". It has a fairy tale and fantasy-inspired theme, called "magical, sad and beautiful" by Yoonjung Yi of BNT News. The dance choreography was created by Soulme to fit the song's theme. When viewed from above, the choreography forms the shapes of the astrological signs. This corresponds with Mimi's rap lyrics: "Out of all the constellations, I take the one that looks like you / And place it gently in the sky".

== Promotion and chart performance ==
On October 7, 2015, Oh My Girl held a comeback showcase at the 2015 Seoul International Music Fair. The album was released the next day on October 8, in both CD and digital format. Oh My Girl began promoting "Closer" on music shows that same day, starting with M! Countdown. The album ranked at number 6 on the weekly Gaon Album Chart, selling 8,743 physical copies during the month of October. The title track was number 75 on the Gaon Digital Chart and sold 26,204 digital downloads. "Closer" also charted at number 12 on the Billboard World Digital Songs chart. Both the song and album only charted in the first week of release. Oh My Girl promoted on music shows for six weeks, with the final performance taking place on Show! Music Core on November 14.

== Critical reception ==
"Closer" ranked number 14 on Billboard's "20 Best K-Pop Songs of 2015". Staff writers Jeff Benjamin and Jessica Oak said the song is a "whirlwind of dreamy, trance-pop from 2015's most promising new female act". They also said the song is "a youthful-yet-sophisticated declaration of longing, and gorgeously done so". Benjamin, writing for Fuse, said it was one of the best rookie releases of 2015. He praised Oh My Girl's unique songs and said they showed their sensual side with the melancholy "Closer". Billboard's Tamar Herman said the music video and choreography "showed a sense of artistry in an industry often accused of taking creativity out of the musical process".

"Closer" came in at number 5 on Noisey's "Top 20 K-pop Songs of 2015". Jakob Dorof said it was the best example of 2015 to show how the music video, choreography and conceptual narrative can enhance the music. He called the song a "quiet storm of trancey dream-pop", enhanced by the lyrics, music video and choreography. He described the other four tracks of the album as "across-the-board winners", with "Say No More" being a "joyously mathed up complication of first album Ariana". At his own website, the K-Pendium, Dorof said "Closer" was K-pop at its "absolute best" and all five tracks are "saccharine marvels of refracted dream pop, '50s chart music, iconic K-pop tropes, and top-shelf Ariana Grande".

== Track listing ==
No.	Title	Lyrics	Music	Arrangement	Length
1.	"Closer"	Seo Ji-eum; Mimi	Laura Brian; Sean Alexander	Avenue 52	3:27
2.	"Say No More"	Seo	Pär Almqvist; August Vinberg; Andreas Öberg	Almqvist	3:06
3.	"Playground"	Lee Bo-ra; 72; Mimi	Kendall Gaveck; Darren "Baby Dee Beats" Smith; Alexander	Avenue 52; Smith	3:56
4.	"Sugar Baby"	Guk Yeo-jin; 72	Gaveck; Smith; Alexander	Smith; Avenue 52	4:22
5.	"Round About"	Kim Eana; Mimi	Almqvist; Vinberg; Öberg	Almqvist	3:40
Total length:					18:31

== Personnel ==
Credits adapted from EP liner notes.

Locations

- Recorded at Doobdoob Studio ("Closer", "Say No More", "Playground", "Round About")
- Recorded at W Sound ("Playground", "Sugar Baby")
- Edited at Doobdoob Studio
- Mixed at W Sound ("Closer", "Playground", "Sugar Baby")
- Mixed at Bono Studio ("Say No More")
- Mixed at RootLab ("Round About")
- Mastered at JFS Mastering

Personnel

- Oh My Girl – vocals, background vocals (on "Closer")
- WM Entertainment Inc. – executive producer
- Lee Won-min – producer
- Kim Jin-mi – executive director
- 72 – music producer
- Moon Jeong-gyu – music producer, vocal director (on "Say No More", "Playground")
- Soulme – choreography director
- Yoo Sung-gyun – music video director
- Jo Dae-young – art director and designer
- Park Min-hee – art director and designer
- Park Do-won – photographer
- Laura Brian – keyboard (on "Closer)
- Sean Alexander – guitar (on "Closer, "Playground", "Sugar Baby"), bass guitar (on "Closer, "Playground"), drum programming (on "Closer)
- Kim Hyun-a – background vocals (on "Closer", "Playground", "Sugar Baby")
- Park Eun-woo – vocal director (on "Sugar Baby"), background vocals (on "Closer", "Say No More", "Sugar Baby")
- Maxx Song – recording engineer, vocal director (on "Closer", "Round About")
- Lee Ji-hong – digital editor (on "Closer", "Say No More", "Round About"), recording engineer (on "Say No More")
- Heo Eun-sook – digital editor (on "Sugar Baby"), mix assistant (on "Closer", "Playground", "Sugar Baby")
- Choi Ja-yeon – recording engineer (on "Playground", "Sugar Baby"), mix assistant (on "Closer", "Playground", "Sugar Baby")
- Jo Joon-seong – mix engineer (on "Closer", "Playground", "Sugar Baby")
- Seong Ji-hoon – mastering engineer
- Pär Almqvist – keyboard (on "Say No More"), drum programming (on "Say No More", "Round About")
- Andreas Öberg – guitar, bass guitar (on "Say No More", "Round About")
- 72 – vocal director (on "Say No More")
- Seon Yeong – mix assistant (on "Say No More")
- Go Seung-wook – mix engineer (on "Say No More")
- Darren "Baby Dee Beats" Smith – keyboard (on "Playground", "Sugar Baby"), bass guitar (on "Sugar Baby"), drum programming (on "Playground", "Sugar Baby")
- Kendall Gaveck – narration (on "Sugar Baby"), background vocals (on "Playground")
- Jang Woo-young – recording engineer (on "Playground")
- Bae Su-jeong – background vocals (on "Round About")
- Lee Chung-moo – mix engineer (on "Round About")

== Charts ==
=== Weekly charts ===
Chart (2015)	Peak position
South Korean Albums (Gaon)	6
