= Oh My Girl (EP) =

EP by Oh My Girl
- Released: April 20, 2015
- Studio: Doobdoob (Seoul); W Sound (Seoul)
- Genre: K-pop
- Length: 11:43
- Language: Korean
- Label: WM
- Producer: Lee Won-min; 72; Moon Jeong-gyu

Oh My Girl chronology
| Oh My Girl (2015) | Closer (2015) |

Singles from Oh My Girl
- 1. "Cupid" Released: April 20, 2015

Oh My Girl is the debut extended play (EP) by South Korean girl group Oh My Girl. It was released by WM Entertainment on April 20, 2015 and distributed by LOEN Entertainment. The album was produced by Lee Won-min, CEO of WM Entertainment, with music produced by 72 and Moon Jeong-gyu. The album contains four songs, including the single "Cupid", which was released in conjunction with the album.

Oh My Girl promoted the album with a series of televised live performances on South Korea's music shows. "Cupid" was favorably reviewed by several music critics, ranking in the top 10 of the K-pop year-end lists of PopMatters and Idolator. The song was also named as one of the best rookie releases of 2015.

== Release and promotion ==
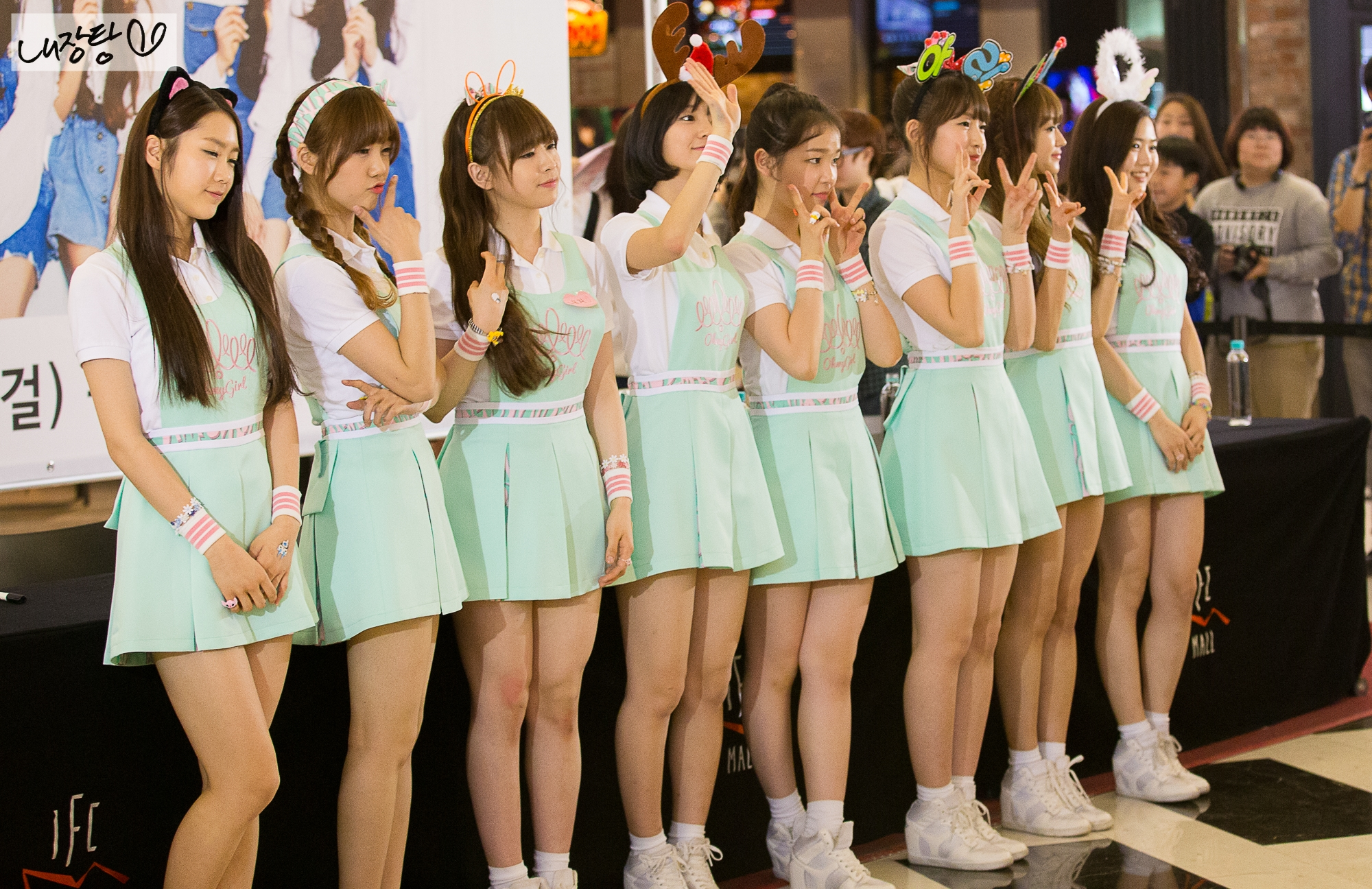
Oh My Girl at IFC Mall in Yeouido, May 2015

WM Entertainment introduced their new eight-member girl group through their official website on March 26, 2015. On April 7, the agency confirmed the album's release date and said final preparations were being made. Oh My Girl's debut EP (also called a mini album) was released on April 20, 2015, in both CD and digital formats. The accompanying music video for "Cupid", produced by Zanybros, was released the same day.

Oh My Girl's debut showcase was held on April 20 at AX Korea in Gwangjin-gu, Seoul, where they performed songs from the album for the first time. The group then promoted the album with performances of "Cupid" on various music shows, starting with SBS MTV's The Show on April 21. They concluded promotions for the album on June 21, with a performance of "Curious" on Inkigayo.

== Composition ==
"Cupid"
"Cupid" features drumline percussion and "bubblegum cheerleader chants".

The album was produced by WM Entertainment's CEO Lee Won-min, with music produced by Choi Jae-hyuk (under the pen name 72) and Moon Jeong-gyu of the Key Artist Agency, a music publishing and production company based in Los Angeles. Three of the four songs (all but "Cupid") have lyrics written by 72 and music by songwriters associated with the agency.

The intro song, "Oh My Girl!", has a rock rhythm and piano melody, and is composed by American songwriter Sean Alexander. "Cupid" is a dance song with a drumline beat and percussion, disco guitars and synths, and multiple key changes. It was produced by Hyuk Shin and Jordan Kyle at Joombas Music Factory, with lyrics by Kim Eana. Explaining the meaning of "Cupid", member Binnie said, "It's a song expressing the hearts of cute girls who ask Cupid for help to have the person they like".

"Hot Summer Nights" is composed by Alexander, Swedish songwriter and guitarist Andreas Öberg, and American musician Rinat Arinos (originally from Israel). The song is about walking on the beach with the person you love; group member JinE said it "reminds you of a good summer memory". "Curious" is a pop ballad with whistling and guitar, composed by Öberg, Alexander, and Alejandra Ocampo. In the lyrics, a young girl in love for the first time plays "he loves me... he loves me not" with a flower.

== Reception ==
"Cupid" received favorable reviews from several music critics. Scott Interrante, writing for PopMatters, described the song as "the perfect distillation of everything K-pop should be: it is saccharine almost to the point of nauseating yet also unusual and unpredictable". He also said Oh My Girl had the strongest debut of the year to date. At the end of the year, Interrante ranked "Cupid" ninth on his list of "The Best K-Pop of 2015", saying the song "captures the electric feeling of being young and in love".

Jacques Peterson, writing for Idolator, described the song as "simultaneously hypnotic and jarring" and called it the "surprise rookie gem of the year". It was number seven on "The 25 Best K-Pop Songs of 2015" list. Jeff Benjamin, writing for Fuse, said it was one of the best rookie releases of 2015 and the "bubblegum cheerleader chants" were unique. Peterson and Benjamin both compared the song to Gwen Stefani's "Hollaback Girl".

== Track listing ==
| No. | Title | Lyrics | Music | Arrangement | Length |
|---|---|---|---|---|---|
| 1. | "Oh My Girl!" (Intro) | 72 | 72; Sean Alexander (Note: Sean Alexander is also credited under his solo project name, Avenue 52.); Avenue 52 | 72; Alexander; Avenue 52 | 1:18 |
| 2. | "Cupid" | Kim Eana | Hyuk Shin; Jordan Kyle; DK; Jarah Gibson | Shin; Kyle; DK; Gibson | 3:27 |
| 3. | "Hot Summer Nights" | Lee Bo-ra; 72; Mimi | Alexander; Andreas Öberg; Rinat Arinos; Avenue 52 | Alexander; Öberg; Arinos; Avenue 52 | 3:17 |
| 4. | "Curious" (Korean: 궁금한걸요; RR: Gunggeumhangeoryo) | Lee; 72 | Öberg; Alexander; Alejandra Ocampo; Avenue 52 | Öberg; Alexander; Ocampo; Avenue 52 | 3:41 |
| Total length: | | | | | 11:43 |

== Personnel ==
Credits adapted from EP liner notes.

Locations

- Recorded at W Sound ("Oh My Girl!", "Hot Summer Nights", "Curious")
- Recorded at Doobdoob Studio ("Cupid")
- Mixed at W Sound ("Oh My Girl!", "Cupid", "Hot Summer Nights", "Curious")
- Mixed at Doobdoob Studio ("Cupid")
- Mastered at Sonic Korea

Personnel

- Oh My Girl – vocals, background vocals (on "Oh My Girl!", "Cupid")
- WM Entertainment Inc. – executive producer
- Lee Won-min – producer
- Kim Jin-mi – executive director
- 72 – music producer
- Moon Jeong-gyu – music producer
- Heo Eun-sook – recording engineer
- Choi Ja-yeon – recording engineer
- Maxx Song – recording engineer
- Jo Joon-seong – mixing engineer
- Jeon Hoon – mastering engineer
- Soulme – choreography director
- Zanybros – music video director
- Jo Dae-young – art direction and design
- Lee Soo-jeong – art direction and design
- Kwon Se-jeong – art direction and design
- Choi Moon-hyuk – photographer
- Sean Michael Alexander – guitar (on "Oh My Girl!"), drum programming (on "Oh My Girl!", "Hot Summer Nights", "Curious"), bass guitar, keyboard (on "Hot Summer Nights"), whistle (on "Curious")
- Gabe Lopez – piano, drum programming (on "Oh My Girl!")
- Kim Hyun-a – background vocals (on "Oh My Girl!", "Hot Summer Nights")
- Mandy Ventrice – background vocals (on "Oh My Girl!")
- 72 – vocal director (on "Oh My Girl!", "Hot Summer Nights", "Curious")
- Moon Jeong-gyu – vocal director (on "Oh My Girl!", "Hot Summer Nights", "Curious")
- Choi Ja-yeon – recording engineer (on "Oh My Girl!", "Hot Summer Nights", "Curious")
- Heo Eun-sook – mix assistant (on "Oh My Girl!", "Hot Summer Nights", "Curious")
- Jo Joon-seong – mix engineer (on "Oh My Girl!", "Cupid", "Hot Summer Nights", "Curious")
- Jeon Hoon – mastering engineer (on "Oh My Girl!", "Cupid", "Hot Summer Nights", "Curious")
- Lee Yoon-ji – guitar, bass guitar (on "Cupid")
- Go Min-ae – background vocals (on "Cupid")
- Bae Soo-jeong – background vocals (on "Cupid")
- Maxx Song – vocal director, recording engineer (on "Cupid")
- Lee Ji-hong – mix assistant (on "Cupid")
- Andreas Öberg – guitar (on "Hot Summer Nights", "Curious"), bass guitar (on "Curious")
- Selena Frelix – background vocals (on "Hot Summer Nights")
- Park Eun-woo – background vocals (on "Curious")

== Charts ==
| Chart (2015) | Peak position |
|---|---|
| South Korean Albums (Gaon) | 6 |
