= The Fifth Season (Oh My Girl album) =

- Digital and Drawing version cover

Studio album by Oh My Girl
- Released: May 8, 2019
- Recorded: 2018–2019
- Studio: ATeam+; Doobdoob; Iconic Sounds
- Length: 35:03
- Language: Korean
- Label: WM Entertainment
- Producer: Moon

Oh My Girl chronology
Oh My Girl Japan Debut Album (2019)	The Fifth Season (2019)	Oh My Girl Japan 2nd Album (2019)

Singles from The Fifth Season
- 1. "The Fifth Season (SSFWL)" Released: May 8, 2019

Reissue: Fall in Love

Singles from Fall in Love
- 1. "Bungee (Fall in Love)" Released: August 5, 2019

The Fifth Season (stylized in all caps) is the debut Korean studio album (second overall) by South Korean girl group Oh My Girl. It was released on May 8, 2019, by WM Entertainment and distributed by Kakao M. The album contains 10 songs, including the title track "The Fifth Season (SSFWL)" and its instrumental.

A reissue titled Fall in Love was released on August 5, 2019, with the lead single "Bungee (Fall in Love)" and its music video released the same date.

== Release and promotion ==
On April 11, 2019, Oh My Girl's agency WM Entertainment revealed that the group has been preparing for a comeback planned for early May. During the Everyday Miracle fanmeet held on April 20, it was announced that the upcoming release would be their debut full length album releasing on May 8.

A press showcase was held in the evening of May 8 to commemorate the release of the new record. The Fifth Season is the group's second studio album overall, released in "Drawing" and "Photography" versions, differing in only its cover artwork. The day after the album's official release, Oh My Girl had their comeback stage for The Fifth Season on the music program M Countdown, performing both "The Fifth Season (SSFWL)" and "Shower" on television for the first time. Oh My Girl received music show awards for "The Fifth Season (SSFWL)" on The Show and Show Champion on May 14 and 15 respectively. The award for the May 16 edition of M Countdown was initially awarded to NU'EST before a statement was released admitting an error regarding point calculation and was awarded to Oh My Girl the following week.

On July 24, WM Entertainment announced that the album would be re-released on August 5, 2019, with two new tracks: "Bungee (Fall in Love)", and "Tropical Love". On August 8, 2019, the group began performing "Bungee (Fall in Love)" on music shows.

== Commercial performance ==
The album debuted at number 4 on South Korea's Weekly Gaon Album Chart and at number 16 on the Monthly Gaon Album Chart, selling 21,203 by the end of May. The title track also peaked at number 26 on the Gaon Digital Chart and at number 7 on the Gaon Download Chart.

== Track listing ==
The Fifth Season
No.	Title	Lyrics	Music	Arrangement	Length
1.	"The Fifth Season (SSFWL)" (다섯 번째 계절 (SSFWL))	Seo Ji-eum	Steven Lee; Caroline Gustavsson; Joe Lawrence	Steven Lee; Joe Lawrence	4:00
2.	"Shower" (Korean: 소나기; RR: Sonagi)	Seo Ji-eum	Steven Lee; Willie Weeks; Becky Jerams	Willie Weeks	3:47
3.	"Case No.L5VE" (Korean: 미제; RR: Mije; lit. Unsolved)	Jeong Hye-lin; Mimi	Hyuk Shin (153/Joombas); MRey (153/Joombas); Ashley Alisha (153/Joombas)	Hyuk Shin (153/Joombas); MRey (153/Joombas)	3:19
4.	"Tic Toc"	Seo Jung-ah	Victor Carl (Galavant); Sebastian Anton Atas (Galavant); SING (aka Mark E. Robertson); JAY Hong	Victor Carl (Galavant); Sebastian Anton Atas (Galavant)	3:15
5.	"Gravity" (Korean: 유성; RR: Yuseong; lit. Meteor)	Seo Ji-eum	Lee Woo-min "collapsedone"; Mayu Wakisaka	Lee Woo-min "collapsedone"	3:09
6.	"Crime Scene"	Shin Jin-hye; Mimi	David Amber; Sean Alexander; Mayu Wakisaka	David Amber	3:27
7.	"Underwater Love" (Korean: 심해 (마음이라는 바다); RR: Simhae (Maeumiraneun Bada); lit. Deep Sea (Feelings are Ocean))	Seo Ji-eum	Park Seul-gi (153/Joombas); Bae Min-soo (153/Joombas); Ashley Alisha (153/Joombas); Le'mon (153/Joombas)	Park Seul-gi (153/Joombas); Bae Min-soo (153/Joombas)	3:30
8.	"Vogue"	Seo Ji-eum; Mimi	MooF (153/Joombas); Ashley Alisha (153/Joombas); JJ Evans (153/Joombas)	MooF (153/Joombas)	3:16
9.	"Checkmate"	Seo Ji-eum; Shin Jin-hye; Seo Jung-ah; Mimi	Ryan S. Jhun; Henri Vuortenvirta; Anna Timgren	Ryan S. Jhun; Henri Vuortenvirta; Anna Timgren	3:14
10.	"The Fifth Season (SSFWL)" (다섯 번째 계절 (SSFWL)) (Instrumental)		Steven Lee; Caroline Gustavsson; Joe Lawrence	Steven Lee; Joe Lawrence	4:00
Total length:					35:03

Fall in Love – Reissue
No.	Title	Lyrics	Music	Arrangement	Length
1.	"Bungee (Fall in Love)" (번지)	Seo Ji-eum; Mimi	Hyuk Shin @ 153/Joombas; Jeong Yoon @ 153/Joombas; Ashley Alisha(153/Joombas); JJ Evans(153/Joombas); MooF(153/Joombas)	Jeong Yoon @ 153/Joombas; MooF(153/Joombas)	2:57
2.	"Tropical Love"	Seo Ji-eum	Lee Woo-min "Collapsedone"; Mayu Wakisaka	Lee Woo-min "Collapsedone"	3:24
3.	"The Fifth Season (SSFWL)" (다섯 번째 계절 (SSFWL))	Seo Ji-eum	Steven Lee; Caroline Gustavsson; Joe Lawrence	Steven Lee; Joe Lawrence	4:00
4.	"Shower" (Korean: 소나기; RR: Sonagi)	Seo Ji-eum	Steven Lee; Willie Weeks; Becky Jerams	Willie Weeks	3:47
5.	"Case No.L5VE" (Korean: 미제; RR: Mije; lit. Unsolved)	Jeong Hye-lin; Mimi	Hyuk Shin (153/Joombas); MRey (153/Joombas); Ashley Alisha (153/Joombas)	Hyuk Shin (153/Joombas); MRey (153/Joombas)	3:19
6.	"Tic Toc"	Seo Jung-ah	Victor Carl (Galavant); Sebastian Anton Atas (Galavant); SING (aka Mark E. Robertson); JAY Hong	Victor Carl (Galavant); Sebastian Anton Atas (Galavant)	3:15
7.	"Gravity" (Korean: 유성; RR: Yuseong; lit. Meteor)	Seo Ji-eum	Lee Woo-min "collapsedone"; Mayu Wakisaka	Lee Woo-min "collapsedone"	3:09
8.	"Crime Scene"	Shin Jin-hye; Mimi	David Amber; Sean Alexander; Mayu Wakisaka	David Amber	3:27
9.	"Underwater Love" (Korean: 심해 (마음이라는 바다); RR: Simhae (Maeumiraneun Bada); lit. Deep Sea (Feelings are Ocean))	Seo Ji-eum	Park Seul-gi (153/Joombas); Bae Min-soo (153/Joombas); Ashley Alisha (153/Joombas); Le'mon (153/Joombas)	Park Seul-gi (153/Joombas); Bae Min-soo (153/Joombas)	3:30
10.	"Vogue"	Seo Ji-eum; Mimi	MooF (153/Joombas); Ashley Alisha (153/Joombas); JJ Evans (153/Joombas)	MooF (153/Joombas)	3:16
11.	"Checkmate"	Seo Ji-eum; Shin Jin-hye; Seo Jung-ah; Mimi	Ryan S. Jhun; Henri Vuortenvirta; Anna Timgren	Ryan S. Jhun; Henri Vuortenvirta; Anna Timgren	3:14
12.	"The Fifth Season (SSFWL)" (다섯 번째 계절 (SSFWL)) (Instrumental))		Steven Lee; Caroline Gustavsson; Joe Lawrence	Steven Lee; Joe Lawrence	4:00
Total length:					41:40

== Charts ==
Chart (2019)	Peak position
South Korean Albums (Gaon)	4
