= Dear OhMyGirl =

- Digital and Dun Dun Bear version cover

EP by Oh My Girl
- Released: May 10, 2021
- Genre: K-pop
- Length: 19:44
- Language: Korean
- Labels: WM; Sony Music
- Producers: Lee Won-min; Moon Jung-gyu

Oh My Girl chronology
Nonstop (2020)	Dear OhMyGirl (2021)	Real Love (2022)

Singles from Dear OhMyGirl
- 1. "Dun Dun Dance" Released: May 10, 2021

Professional ratings
Review scores
Source	Rating
IZM	3/5 stars

Dear OhMyGirl is the eighth extended play (EP) by South Korean girl group Oh My Girl. It was released on May 10, 2021, by WM Entertainment and distributed by Sony Music. The album contains six songs including the lead single, "Dun Dun Dance".

== Background and release ==
Oh My Girl released their seventh EP Nonstop in April 2020. The EP spawned two singles, "Nonstop" and "Dolphin", both of which became commercially successful in South Korea, earning platinum certifications from the Korea Music Content Association (KMCA). On April 16, 2021, the group's label WM Entertainment announced that Oh My Girl would be releasing a new EP the following month. The album's title Dear OhMyGirl was revealed on April 19. A promotion schedule for the mini-album was uploaded to the group's social media accounts three days later.

The first track teaser film was released on April 25. The first concept image teaser was uploaded the next day. The teasers feature each group member dressed in denims, holding transparent umbrellas against a rainy backdrop. The full tracklist of the album was revealed on April 27. On April 28, a second track teaser film was uploaded by the group. A third track film was released two days later. The second set of concept image photos were released on May 2. The teasers show the members dressed in floral printed outfits, against the backdrop of sofas and curtains. A fourth track teaser film was uploaded by the group on May 3. On May 4, the group uploaded an image containing a portion of lyrics of the lead single "Dun Dun Dance". The group released a medley teaser, previewing all six tracks on the album the following day. A track film for the lead single was released on May 6. The final set of concept image teasers was released on May 7. On May 8, the fifth and the final track teaser film was uploaded. The music video teaser of "Dun Dun Dance" was released on May 9. The album was released on May 10, in both CD and digital formats. A music video for "Dun Dun Dance" was released the same day. The video features Oh My Girl dancing to the track on an open green field and has a sci-fi-inspired theme.

== Production and composition ==
The album opener and lead single "Dun Dun Dance" was written by Seo Ji-eum of Jam Factory, who co-wrote "Nonstop", with producers Scott Stoddart and Ryan S. Jhun, and composer Anna Timgren. "Dun Dun Dance" is a nu-disco song with a dynamic rhythm and an alternating funk and trap beat. It features retro instrumentation, vocal harmonies, and a dance-pop style refrain. "Dear You" is pop song with 8-bit synth flourishes, and has warm, comforting lyrics. "My Doll" has lyrics written by Jung Yoon-hwa, and has a dream-pop sound. "Quest" is a trap-style song characterized by bouncing instrumental elements, 808 drums, 8-bit synth effects, and multiple vocal changes. It was produced by Ryan S. Jhun, Jeppe London Bilsby, and Lauritz Emil Christiansen, with lyrics co-written by member Mimi. "Invitation" is a bossa nova song featuring an electric guitar over a trap-style beat. "Swan" was described as having "dreamy" lyrics with rock beats and a drop section.

== Promotion ==
On May 10, Oh My Girl held an online comeback showcase where they performed songs from the album for the first time. A choreography video for "Dun Dun Dance" was released on May 11. Oh My Girl began promoting the album on music programs, starting with M! Countdown on May 13.

== Track listing ==
Dear OhMyGirl track listing
No.	Title	Lyrics	Music	Arrangement	Length
1.	"Dun Dun Dance"	Seo Ji-eum; Ryan S. Jhun; Scott Stoddart; Anna Timgren	Ryan S. Jhun; Scott Stoddart; Anna Timgren	Ryan S. Jhun; Scott Stoddart	3:40
2.	"Dear You" (Korean: 나의 봄에게; RR: Naui bomege; lit. 'To my spring')	Seo Jung-ah	Ryan S. Jhun; Celine Svanbäck; Jeppe London; Lauritz Christiansen; Ericka Jane	Ryan S. Jhun; Jeppe London; Lauritz Christiansen	3:36
3.	"My Doll" (Korean: 나의 인형 (안녕, 꿈에서 놀아); RR: Naui inhyeong (annyeong, kkumeseo nora); lit. 'My Doll (Bye. Play in your dreams)')	Jung Yoon-hwa	Ryan S. Jhun; Chris Smith; Berit Dybing; Olivia Greenlees	Ryan S. Jhun; RISC	3:24
4.	"Quest"	Seo Jung-ah; Mimi; Ryan S. Jhun; Celine Svanbäck; Jeppe London; Lauritz Christiansen	Ryan S. Jhun; Celine Svanbäck; Jeppe London; Lauritz Christiansen; Polina Goudieva	Ryan S. Jhun; Jeppe London; Lauritz Christiansen	3:28
5.	"Who Comes Who Knows" (Korean: 초대장; RR: Chodaejang; lit. 'Invitation Card')	Seo Jung-ah; Ryan S. Jhun; Jay Putty; David Mescon; Jaquelyn Walters; Kendall Brower	Ryan S. Jhun; Jay Putty; David Mescon; Jaquelyn Walters; Kendall Brower	Ryan S. Jhun; David Mescon	3:01
6.	"Swan"	Seo Jung-ah	Ryan S. Jhun; Celine Svanbäck; Jeppe London; Mich Hansen; Sam Merrifield	Ryan S. Jhun; Jeppe London; Cutfather	2:35
Total length:					19:44

== Charts ==
=== Weekly charts ===
Weekly chart performance for Dear OhMyGirl
Chart (2021)	Peak position
Japanese Albums (Oricon)	22
South Korean Albums (Gaon)	3

=== Year-end charts ===
Year-end chart performance for Dear OhMyGirl
Chart (2021)	Position
South Korean Albums (Gaon)	98

== Accolades ==
Music program awards
Song	Program	Date	Ref.
"Dun Dun Dance"	The Show	May 18, 2021	
"Dun Dun Dance"	The Show	May 25, 2021	
"Dun Dun Dance"	Show Champion	May 26, 2021	
