= Nonstop (EP) =

- Digital and Chance version cover

EP by Oh My Girl
- Released: April 27, 2020
- Genre: K-pop; dance; ballad
- Length: 17:28
- Language: Korean
- Label: WM; Kakao M (digital); Sony Music (physical)
- Producer: Lee Won-min; Moon Jung-gyu

Oh My Girl chronology
Eternally (2020)	Nonstop (2020)	Dear OhMyGirl (2021)

Singles from Nonstop
- 1. "Nonstop" Released: April 27, 2020

Nonstop (stylized in all caps) is the seventh extended play (EP) by South Korean girl group Oh My Girl. It was released by WM Entertainment on April 27, 2020 and distributed by Kakao M and Sony Music. The album contains five songs, including the lead single "Nonstop". The lead single, "Nonstop", set the record as the longest-running girl group song on MelOn Daily Chart Top 100 at August 20, 2021 with 480 days, and continued to chart for another 21 days. It was then dethroned by their own b-side track "Dolphin" which charted for 546 consecutive days.

== Track listing ==
No.	Title	Lyrics	Music	Arrangement	Length
1.	"Nonstop" (Korean: 살짝 설렜어 (Note: As 렜 is not in KS X 1001 (pre-Unicode South Korean character set), it is sometimes garbled.); RR: Saljjak seollesseo; lit. 'I Was a Little Excited')	Seo Ji-eum; Mimi	Steven Lee; Andreas Johansson; Laurell Barker; Sebastian Thott	Sebastian Thott	3:22
2.	"Dolphin"	Seo Jung-ah	Ryan S. Jhun; Celine Svanbäck; Chloe Latimer; Jeppe London; Lauritz Christiansen	Ryan S. Jhun; Celine Svanbäck; Chloe Latimer; Jeppe London; Lauritz Christiansen	2:56
3.	"Flower Tea" (꽃차)	Seo Ji-eum	Lee Joo-hyung (MonoTree); Mayu Wakisaka	Lee Joo-hyung (MonoTree)	4:19
4.	"NE♡N (Note: Read as "neon")"	Seo Ji-eum	Maria Marcus; Freja Blomberg Jonsson	Maria Marcus; Freja Blomberg Jonsson	3:14
5.	"Krystal"	Junebug	Steven Lee; Joe Lawrence; Linda Quero	Joe Lawrence	3:37
Total length:					17:30

== Accolades ==
Music program awards
Song	Program	Date	Ref.
"Nonstop"	The Show	May 5, 2020	
"Nonstop"	The Show	May 12, 2020	
"Nonstop"	Show Champion	May 6, 2020	
"Nonstop"	M Countdown	May 7, 2020	
"Nonstop"	M Countdown	May 14, 2020	
"Nonstop"	Show! Music Core	May 9, 2020	
"Nonstop"	Inkigayo	May 10, 2020	
"Nonstop"	Music Bank	May 15, 2020	

== Charts ==
Sales chart performance for Nonstop (EP)
Chart (2020)	Peak position
South Korean Albums (Gaon)	3

Sales and streaming chart performance for songs in "Nonstop"
Song	Chart (2020)	Peak position
"Nonstop"	South Korea (Gaon)	2
"Dolphin"	South Korea (Gaon)	9

== Release history ==
Release formats of Nonstop
Region	Date	Format	Label
Various	April 27, 2020	Digital download, streaming	WM Entertainment
South Korea	April 27, 2020	CD	WM Entertainment; Sony Music
