= Oh My Girl =

South Korean girl group

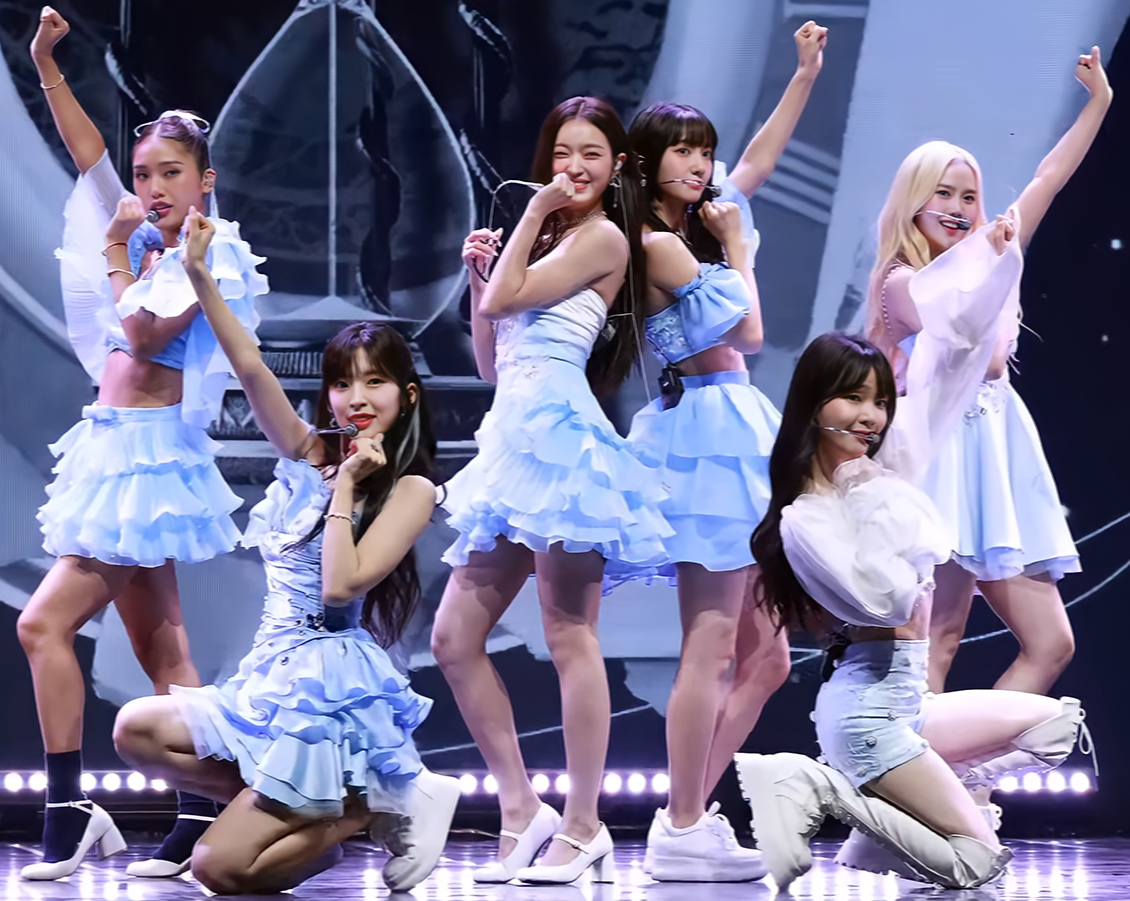
- Oh My Girl in July 2023; L–R: Mimi, Arin, YooA, Yubin, Seunghee, and Hyojung

Background information
- Origin: Seoul, South Korea
- Genre: K-pop
- Years active: 2015–present
- Labels: WM; DSP; Ariola Japan
- Spinoffs: Oh My Girl Banhana
- Members: Hyojung; Mimi; YooA; Seunghee; Yubin; Arin
- Past members: JinE; Jiho
- Website: ohmy-girl.com

Oh My Girl (Korean: 오마이걸, stylized in all caps or OMG) is a South Korean girl group formed by WM Entertainment and is currently under DSP Media. The group is composed of six members: Hyojung, Mimi, YooA, Seunghee, Yubin and Arin. Oh My Girl was originally an eight-piece group; JinE left the group in October 2017 due to health issues, and Jiho left in May 2022. Oh My Girl debuted on April 20, 2015, with an eponymous extended play.

== History ==
=== 2015–2016: Debut, early years and JinE's hiatus ===
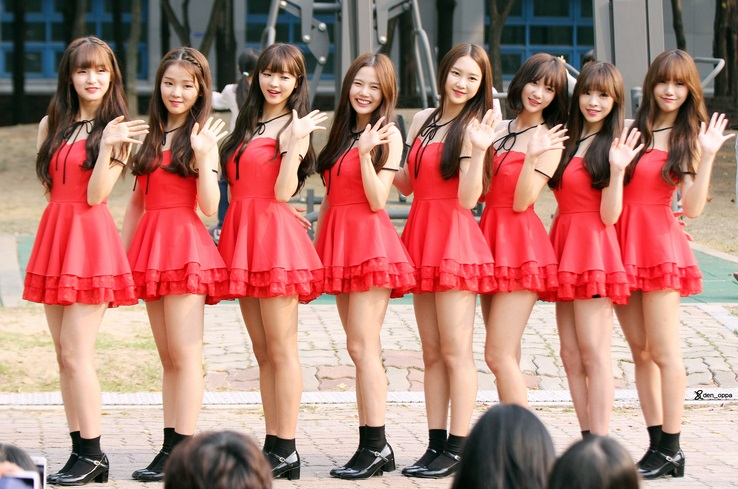
Oh My Girl at an Inkigayo fan meet in October 2015

Oh My Girl was publicized as the sister group of label-mate group B1A4. On March 26, 2015, teaser images of the eight members were released as well as their concept images. On April 20, the group released their first extended play, Oh My Girl, which included the single "Cupid". They held their debut showcase the same day. They first performed the single on SBS MTV's The Show on April 21.

On June 21, the group announced that they were currently preparing a new album. Their second EP, Closer, was released on October 8. The single of the same name was performed on Mnet's M Countdown on October 7.

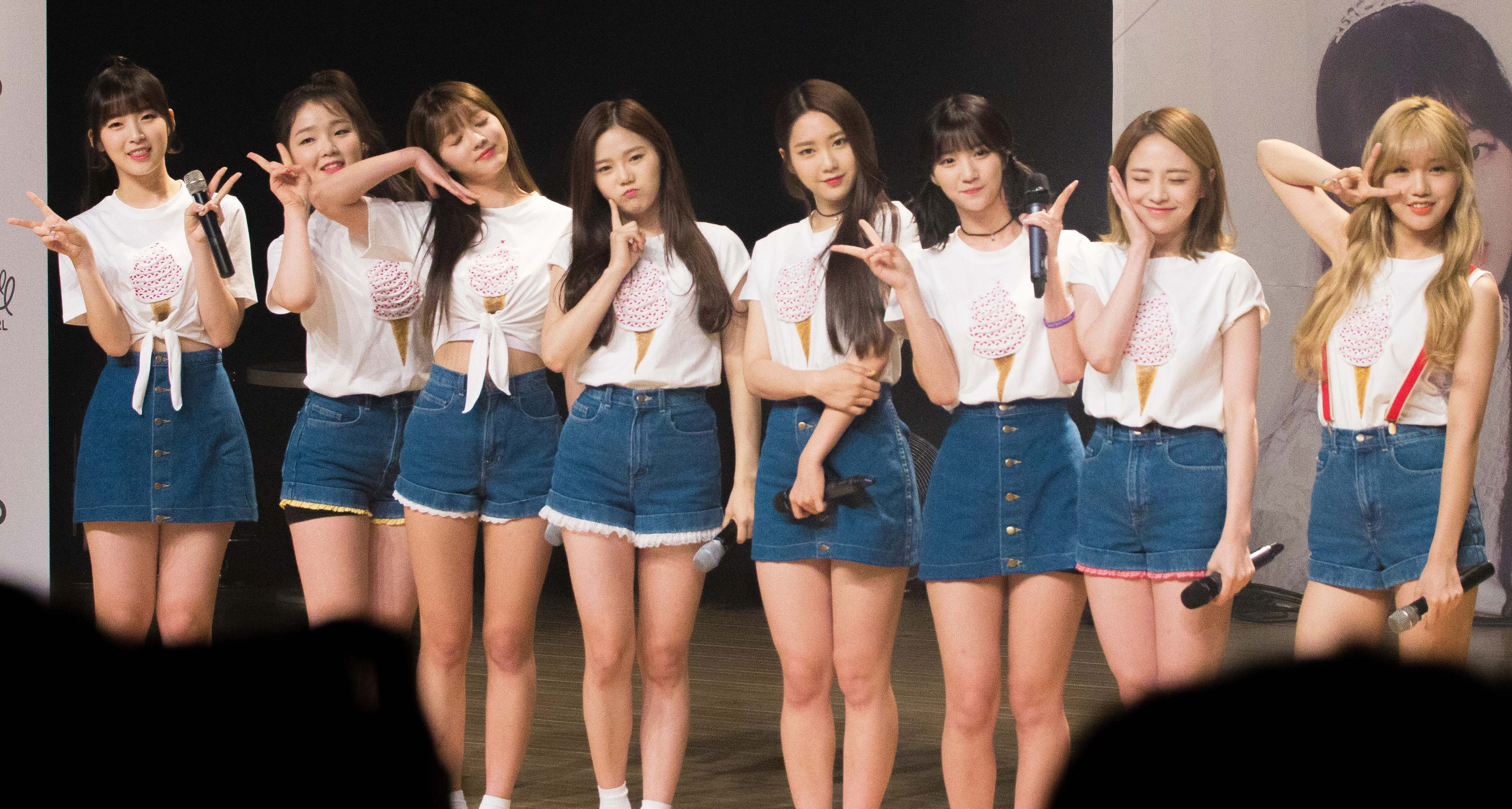
Oh My Girl at the Miracle Day fan meet in July 2016

Oh My Girl's third EP, Pink Ocean, was released on March 28, 2016, with the title track "Liar Liar", and a pre-released single "Step by Step". On the same day, Oh My Girl announced their official fandom name, "Miracle", at their comeback showcase for Pink Ocean and also on the group's V-app. The group promoted "Liar Liar" and "Step by Step", a B-side written by B1A4's Jinyoung, on their comeback stages and at guerrilla concerts in Hongdae and Sinchon.

On May 26, 2016, the group released the reissue of Pink Ocean, titled Windy Day with two new songs, "Windy Day" and "Stupid in Love", along with the Chinese version of "Liar Liar" (which was released in Pink Ocean exclusively on online streaming services in China). On August 1, they released a special summer single album containing four remake songs, including Papaya's "Listen to My Word (A-ing)" featuring Skull and Haha. The album was the group's first to top the Gaon weekly charts.

On August 20 and 21, the group held their first solo concert titled "Summer Fairy Tales" at the Blue Square Samsung Card Hall in Seoul, South Korea. Tickets were available to purchase on July 22 and were sold out within three minutes, breaking the record for the fastest sold-out concert for a rookie group.

On August 25, WM Entertainment released a statement announcing JinE's hiatus from the group's activities while she received treatment for anorexia nervosa.

=== 2017–2018: Coloring Book, JinE's departure, Secret Garden, first sub-unit and Remember Me ===
On March 13, WM Entertainment announced on Oh My Girl's fancafe that their next album is scheduled to be released in April. JinE will not be taking part in upcoming album promotions and activities in favor of continued treatment and recovery. WM has also stated that JinE's health has improved since last year, and WM is focusing on long-term treatment for JinE. Oh My Girl's fourth EP, Coloring Book, was released on April 3, along with the title track of the same name. During Oh My Girl's Comeback Showcase, it was revealed that the pink dolphin in the Coloring Book MV, was made in reference to JinE.

On October 30, WM Entertainment confirmed that due to continued health issues, JinE's contract with the company had been terminated and that she had officially left the group.

On December 23, 2017, WM Entertainment announced Oh My Girl's comeback on January 9, with their fifth EP Secret Garden. The group held a mini concert titled "Oh My Girl's Secret Garden". Tickets were available to purchase on December 28 and were sold out within two minutes for 3,000 tickets, proved their popularity by completely selling out concert since last year. The six-day sold-out concert held beginning February 22 to 26 at the Shinsegae Mesa Hall in Seoul, South Korea. On January 23, 2018, the group won their first music show trophy on The Show and the second trophy on Show Champion on January 24, 2018, with "Secret Garden".

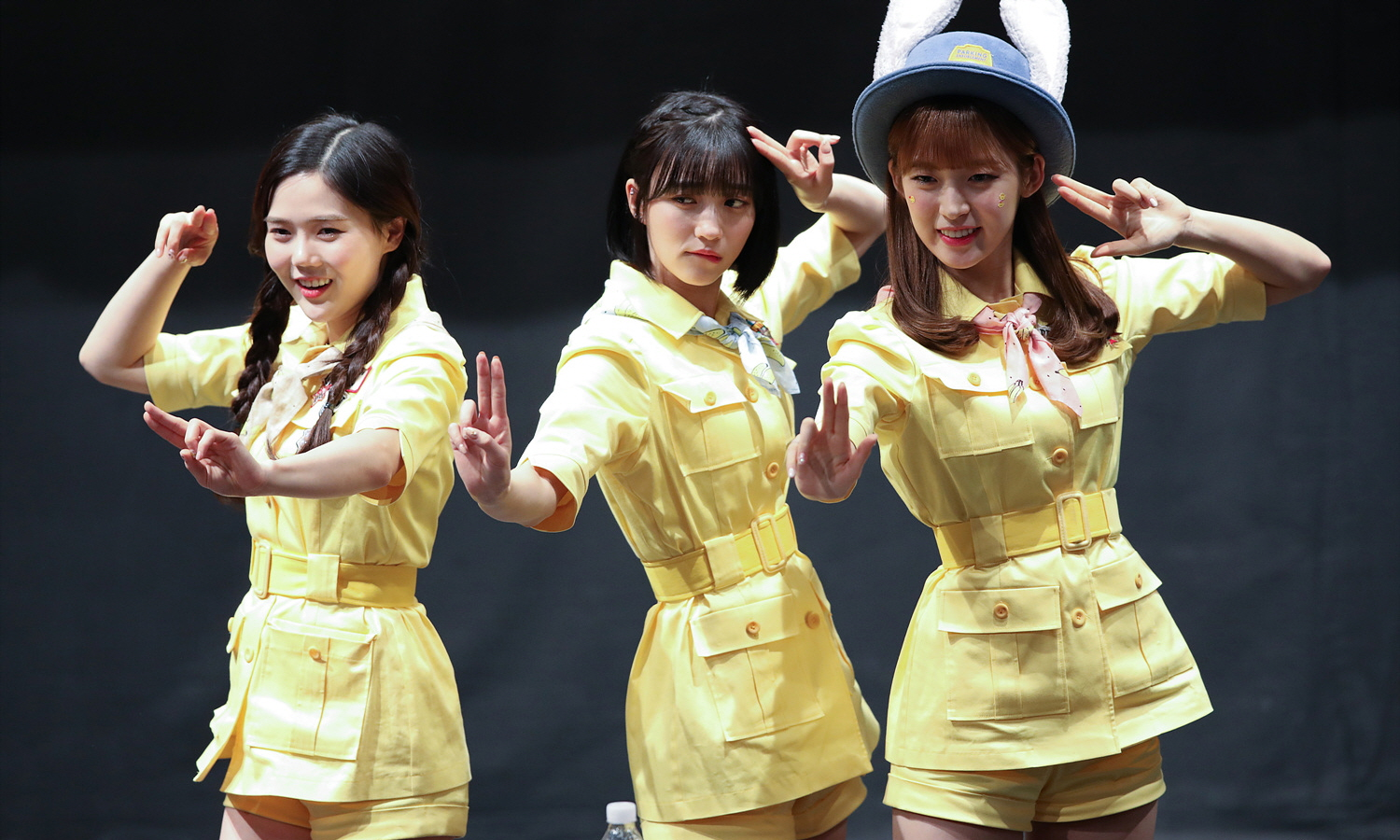
Oh My Girl Banhana

It was announced that the group would release a pop-up album titled Oh My Girl Banhana - Banana Allergy Monkey on April 2. The title track "Banana Allergy Monkey" is sung by the group's sub-unit Oh My Girl Banhana, which consists of Hyojung, Yubin and Arin.

In June, the group signed a recording deal with Ariola Japan, a Sony Music Japan label. The Banhana sub-unit debuted in August 2018 with a Japanese version of the Banana Allergy Monkey EP.

On August 24, WM Entertainment confirmed that the group will make a Korean comeback. Oh My Girl's sixth EP, Remember Me, was released on September 10, along with the title track of the same name. The group's second concert titled "Fall Fairy Tales" was held on October 20 & 21.

=== 2019: Japanese debut, The Fifth Season and Queendom ===
Oh My Girl started the year with their first Japan Debut Commemoration Live Tour, on January 4–6, 2019 in Fukuoka, Osaka and Tokyo. On January 9, the group released their debut Japanese album, as a whole group. Oh My Girl Japan Debut Album debuted at number 1 on the Oricon Daily Album Chart on January 8, 2019, selling 9,383 physical copies. The album charted at number 2 on Oricon Weekly Album Chart sold 15,910 units. It topped on Billboard Japan Top Albums Sales, which sold 20,041 units, and peaked at number 4 on Billboard Japan Hot Albums.

On May 8, they released their first Korean studio album, The Fifth Season, alongside its lead single, "The Fifth Season (SSFWL)".

On July 3, the group released their second Japanese album, Oh My Girl Japan 2nd Album. The album, Fall In Love a reissue of their first album, The Fifth Season, was released on August 5 along with the music video for the lead single "Bungee (Fall In Love)".

In August 2019, it was confirmed that the group would be participating in Queendom. In the first round, they performed "Secret Garden" and finished in third place. Then in the second round the group covered "Destiny" by Lovelyz, finishing in first place, this cover was later released as a single on September 20, 2019. In the third round they performed a remix of their song "Twilight", finishing in first place again. This was also released as a single. On October 25, 2019, the group released a single titled "Guerilla" as a part of the Queendom Final Comeback. In the final episode, they finished 1st runner-up for the whole program.

=== 2020: Eternally, Nonstop, and commercial success ===
On October 1, 2019, the group announced on their Japanese website that they would be releasing their third Japanese album Eternally on January 8, 2020. Then, on October 30, 2019, the Japanese version of Bungee was released to signify the first single off of Eternally. In November, the group revealed the tracklist for Eternally, stating that the album would consist of four new Japanese songs: "Eternally", "Precious Moment", "Fly to the Sky", and "Polaris". Along with this, it was stated that the album would contain the newly released finale single from Queendom, Guerilla. Like their previous two Japanese albums, the group allowed their Japanese fan clubs to decide the remaining tracks on the album based on popularity. On December 25, 2019, the group released their third Japanese album, Eternally, digitally on music platforms globally, two weeks ahead of its January 8, 2020 physical release. Outside of Japan, this digital release includes the first five tracks of the album. Locally, the digital release included the first eight tracks, which includes the original Korean language versions for "Bungee (Fall in Love)", "Guerilla" and "Love O'Clock".

On April 13, WM Entertainment confirmed that the group would make a comeback on April 27, with Jiho returning from her hiatus. Subsequently, the group released a teaser announcing that their return will be with their seventh EP Nonstop with a game-themed concept. The EP and the music video for the lead single "Nonstop" were released on April 27. Both the single and B-side track "Dolphin" became the group's highest-charting releases at the time, peaking at number two and number nine on the weekly Gaon Digital Chart, respectively.

According to Oh My Girl's Japanese Website, following certain milestones met on the LINE MUSIC app, Oh My Girl would have releases for three consecutive months. The first release was the Japanese version of Nonstop and was released digitally across multiple platforms on June 29. About a month after, the second release, a Japanese single, Lemonade, released digitally on July 27. The third release, a Japanese single, Tear Rain, was released digitally on all music platforms on August 24, 2020

At the 2020 Soribada Best K-Music Awards, held on August 13, Oh My Girl received a Bonsang award.

On August 16, Oh My Girl released a collaboration single with Pororo the Little Penguin with the title "Supadupa" and also a version of the original soundtrack of Pororo's "Barabam".

Oh My Girl also teased a collaboration with Keanu Silva and Mougleta on August 21. The collaboration single "Rocket Ride" was released on August 28.

On September 23, Oh My Girl announced on their Japanese website that they will be releasing their first Japanese single "Etoile / Nonstop Japanese ver." on November 25. The single contains the previous three digital releases that were revealed over the past three months: Nonstop (Japanese ver.), Lemonade, and Tear Rain, along with the new single Etoile, which was released digitally on music platforms on October 8, 2020. There will be four versions of the single, each will contain a different instrumental track. There will also be a special "Anime Edition" that will contain an English Version of Etoile. On October 15, the Korean version of Etoile was released digitally on all music platforms.

=== 2021–2022: Dear OhMyGirl, Real Love, Oh My Girl Best and Jiho's departure ===
On April 16, 2021, WM Entertainment announced that Oh My Girl would return with a new album in early May. Their eighth EP Dear OhMyGirl was released on May 10, alongside the lead single "Dun Dun Dance". The single peaked atop the Gaon Digital Chart, becoming the group's first chart-topper. On July 14, Oh My Girl announced their second Japanese single "Dun Dun Dance Japanese ver.", which was released on September 22. On December 23, Oh My Girl released the promotional single "Shark" through Universe Music for the mobile application, Universe.

On January 19, 2022, WM Entertainment announced that Binnie will be changing her stage name to Yubin. On February 24, Oh My Girl announced they would be releasing their Japanese compilation album, Oh My Girl Best, on March 30. On March 7, WM Entertainment announced that Oh My Girl would be releasing their second Korean studio album, Real Love, on March 28, alongside the lead single of the same name. On May 9, Jiho left the group after deciding not to renew her contract with WM and Oh My Girl would reorganize as six members. On August 4, Oh My Girl joined the Weverse platform.

=== 2023–present: Golden Hourglass, Dreamy Resonance and contract renewal ===
On July 24, 2023, Oh My Girl released their ninth EP Golden Hourglass.

On August 26, 2024, Oh My Girl released their tenth EP Dreamy Resonance.

The group released the digital single "Oh My" on April 9, 2025, to commemorate their tenth anniversary. On May 8, WM Entertainment announced that its exclusive contracts with members YooA and Arin had ended, but the two will remain in the group and be involved in all future group activities. The remaining members have also extended their contracts with the company.

In August 2026, Oh My Girl was transferred over to DSP Media.

== Members ==
=== Current ===
Sourced from official website

- Hyojung (효정) – leader, vocalist
- Mimi (미미) – rapper, dancer, vocalist
- YooA (유아) – vocalist
- Seunghee (승희) – vocalist
- Yubin (유빈) – vocalist
- Arin (아린) – vocalist

=== Former ===
- JinE (진이) – vocalist
- Jiho (지호) – vocalist

=== Sub-unit ===
- Oh My Girl Banhana (Korean: 오마이걸 반하나) – Hyojung, Yubin, Arin

== Discography ==
Korean albums

- The Fifth Season (2019)
- Real Love (2022)

Japanese albums

- Oh My Girl Japan Debut Album (2019)
- Oh My Girl Japan 2nd Album (2019)
- Eternally (2020)

== Ambassadorship ==
Girl Scouts Korea appointed Oh My Girl as the ninth promotional ambassadors of the Girl Scouts Korea. The appointment ceremony was held at the Girl Scouts Korea Federation Hall in Anguk-dong, Seoul.

== Filmography ==
=== Television ===
- Oh My Girl Cast (MBC Music, 2015)
- Found You! Oh My Girl (Naver TV Cast, 2016)
- Oh My Girl Miracle Expedition (HeyoTV, 2018)
- Queendom (Mnet, 2019)

== Concert and tours ==
=== Headlining concerts ===
- Oh My Girl 1st Concert "Summer Fairy Tales" (2016)
- Oh My Girl's Secret Garden (2018)
- Oh My Girl 1st Fan Concert in Asia (2018)
- Oh My Girl 2nd Concert "Fall Fairy Tales" (2018)

==== Oh My Girl 1st Concert "Summer Fairy Tales" (2016) ====
Date	City	Country	Venue
August 20, 2016	Seoul	South Korea	Blue Square Samsung Card Hall
August 21, 2016	Seoul	South Korea	Blue Square Samsung Card Hall

==== Oh My Girl's Secret Garden (2018) ====
Date	City	Country	Venue	Attendance
January 22, 2018	Seoul	South Korea	Shinsegae Mesa Hall	3,000
January 29, 2018	Seoul	South Korea	Shinsegae Mesa Hall	3,000
February 5, 2018	Seoul	South Korea	Shinsegae Mesa Hall	3,000
February 12, 2018	Seoul	South Korea	Shinsegae Mesa Hall	3,000
February 19, 2018	Seoul	South Korea	Shinsegae Mesa Hall	3,000
February 26, 2018	Seoul	South Korea	Shinsegae Mesa Hall	3,000

==== Oh My Girl 1st Fan Concert in Asia (2018) ====
Date	City	Country	Venue
May 5, 2018	Singapore		Resorts World Theatre
May 26, 2018	Hong Kong		Music Zone @ E-Max
June 2, 2018	Taipei	Taiwan	Westar Taipei

==== Oh My Girl 2nd Concert "Fall Fairy Tales" (2018) ====
Date	City	Country	Venue
October 20, 2018	Seoul	South Korea	Blue Square iMarket Hall
October 21, 2018	Seoul	South Korea	Blue Square iMarket Hall

=== Headlining tours ===
- Oh My Girl Japan Debut Commemoration Live Tour (2019)
- Oh My Girl 1st U.S. Tour (2019)
- Oh My Girl 1st Tour in Brazil (2019)
- Oh My Girl Zepp Live Tour "Starlight" (2019–2020)

==== Oh My Girl Japan Debut Commemoration Live Tour (2019) ====
Date	City	Country	Venue
January 4, 2019	Fukuoka	Japan	Tsukushi Kaikan
January 5, 2019	Osaka	Japan	Matsushita IMP Hall
January 6, 2019	Tokyo	Japan	Nippon Seinenkan

==== Oh My Girl 1st U.S. Tour (2019) ====
Date	City	Country	Venue
January 18, 2019	Atlanta	United States	Center Stage Theater
January 20, 2019	Chicago	United States	Park West Theater
January 22, 2019	Houston	United States	Stereo Live Houston
January 26, 2019	Indio	United States	Fantasy Springs
January 27, 2019	San Jose	United States	Montgomery Theatre

==== Oh My Girl 1st Tour in Brazil (2019) ====
Date	City	Country	Venue
January 29, 2019	Rio de Janeiro	Brazil	Teatro Dercy Gonçalves
January 30, 2019	Porto Alegre	Brazil	Auditório Elizabeth Lee
January 31, 2019	Curitiba	Brazil	Teatro da FEP
February 2, 2019	São Paulo	Brazil	Tropical Butantã
February 3, 2019	São Paulo	Brazil	Teatro UMC

==== Oh My Girl Zepp Live Tour 2019 "Starlight" ====
Date	City	Country	Venue
October 24, 2019	Osaka	Japan	Zepp Osaka Bayside
October 25, 2019	Fukuoka	Japan	Zepp Fukuoka
October 27, 2019	Tokyo	Japan	Zepp Tokyo

==== Oh My Girl Zepp Live Tour "Starlight Again" ====
Date	City	Country	Venue
January 4, 2020	Osaka	Japan	Zepp Namba
January 5, 2020	Tokyo	Japan	Toyosu PIT

=== Showcase ===
- Oh My Girl Banhana Japan Debut Showcase Live (2018)
