= Go Live =

Go Live may refer to:

- Go Live (album), a 2020 album by South Korean boy group Stray Kids
  - "Go Live" (song), its track
- Go Live (EP), a 2019 EP by South Korean–Japanese boy group ONF
