= Popping (EP) =

EP by ONF
- Released: August 9, 2021
- Recorded: 2021
- Length: 17:43
- Language: Korean
- Label: WM Entertainment; Stone Music Entertainment
- Producer: MonoTree; MK

ONF chronology
City of ONF (2021)	Popping (2021)	Goosebumps (2021)

Singles from Popping
- 1. "Popping" Released: August 9, 2021

Music video
- "Popping" Video on YouTube

Popping is the first popup album by South Korean–Japanese boy group ONF, released on August 9, 2021, by WM Entertainment and distributed by Stone Music Entertainment. The album contains five tracks, including the funky disco title track "Popping."

== Background and release ==
On July 14, 2021, WM Entertainment announced ONF would be having a comeback in early August. On July 18, the first official teaser revealed the date of the comeback as August 9th as well as the album and title track as "Popping." "Popping" topped the Bugs music chart upon its release.

== Promotion ==
ONF held their comeback showcase on August 9 at the YES24 Live Hall and via V Live where the group performed their new songs "Popping," "Dry Ice" and "Summer End." They also performed tracks from their previous albums: "Sukhumvit Swimming" and "On-You - Interlude." The group performed "Popping" on M Countdown for their first day of promotions.

== Achievements ==
"Popping" ranked #1 on the Bugs music chart upon its release, as well as the iTunes US K-Pop Song Chart and Worldwide iTunes Song Chart for seven days. In addition, the album topped the Worldwide iTunes Album Chart in 15 countries. "Popping" also charted at #2 on the Billboard World Digital Song Sales chart.

== Track listing ==
No.	Title	Lyrics	Music	Arrangement	Length
1.	"여름 쏙 (Popping)"	황현 (MonoTree); WYATT (온앤오프)	황현 (MonoTree)	황현 (MonoTree)	3:24
2.	"여름 시 (Summer Poem)"	황현 (MonoTree); WYATT (온앤오프)	황현 (MonoTree); MK (온앤오프)	황현 (MonoTree)	3:09
3.	"여름의 모양 (Summer Shape)"	손고은 (MonoTree)	손고은 (MonoTree)	황현 (MonoTree); Jun_p	3:55
4.	"여름의 온도 (Dry Ice)"	GDLO (MonoTree); WYATT (온앤오프); Inner Child (MonoTree)	SCORE (13); Megatone (13); Inner Child (MonoTree), 황현 (MonoTree); MK (온앤오프)	SCORE (13); Megatone (13)	3:22
5.	"여름의 끝 (Summer End)"	황현 (MonoTree); WYATT (온앤오프)	황현 (MonoTree)	황현 (MonoTree)	3:51
Total length:					17:43
