= You Complete Me =

You Complete Me may refer to:

- A line spoken by the titular character in the film Jerry Maguire
- You Complete Me (album), a 2006 album by Toni Gonzaga
- "You Complete Me" (song), a 2009 song by Keyshia Cole
- You Complete Me (EP), a 2018 EP by ONF
- "You Complete Me", a 1998 song by Stabbing Westward from Darkest Days
