= Lee Chae-yeon =

South Korean singer and dancer (born 2000)

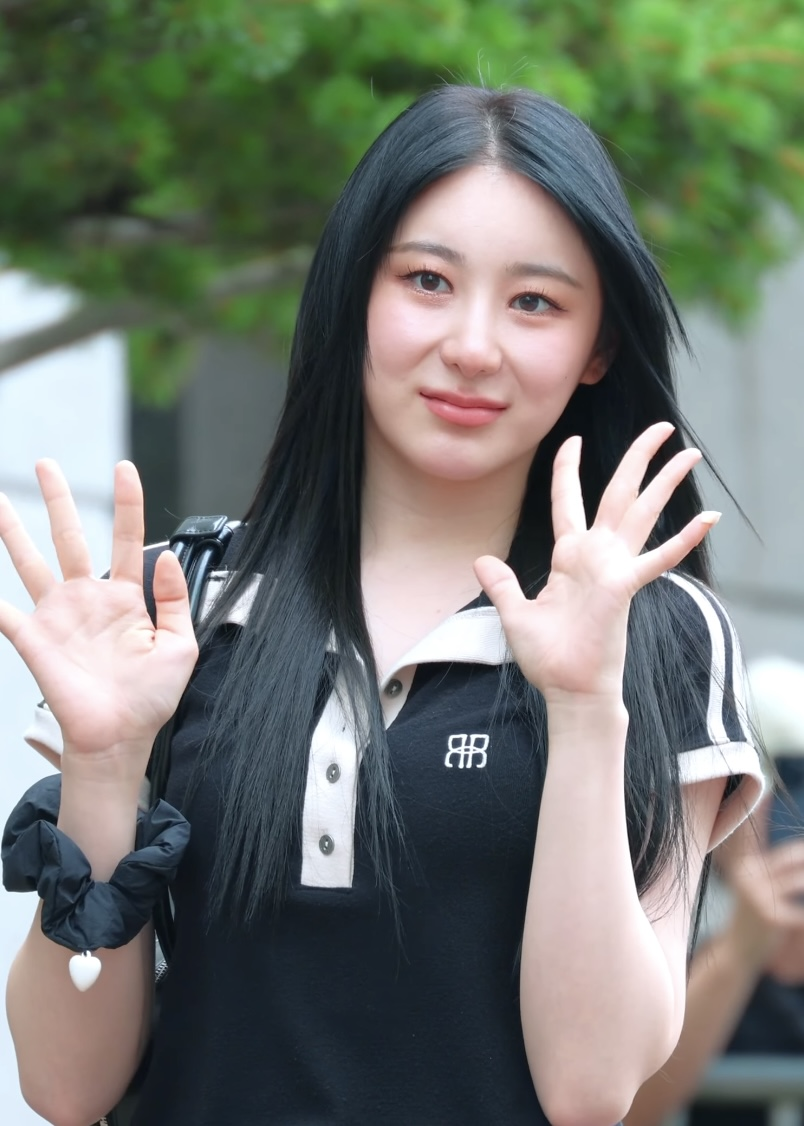
- Lee in July 2024
- Born: January 11, 2000 (age 26); Yongin, South Korea
- Occupations: Singer; dancer; actress
- Years active: 2013–present
- Relatives: Chaeryeong (sister)
- Musical career
- Genres: K-pop; J-pop
- Years active: 2018–present
- Labels: WM; Off The Record (Note: As a member of Iz*One only); EMI; DOD
- Formerly of: Iz*One

Korean name
- Hangul: 이채연
- RR: I Chaeyeon
- MR: I Ch'aeyŏn

Signature
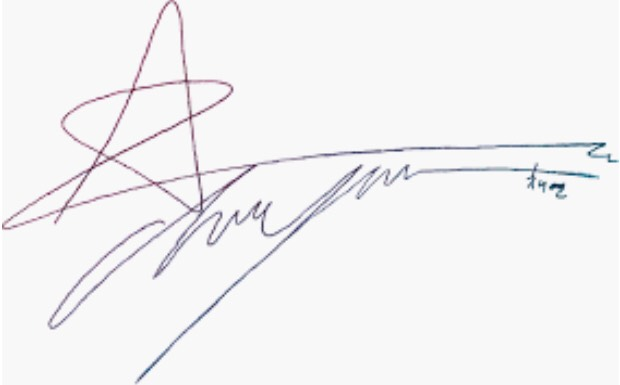

Lee Chae-yeon (Korean: 이채연; born January 11, 2000) is a South Korean singer, dancer, and actress. She was a member of the South Korean-Japanese girl group Iz*One, and made her solo debut in 2022 with her first extended play (EP), Hush Rush.

== Early life ==
Lee Chae-yeon was born on January 11, 2000, in Yongin, South Korea. She is the older sister of Chaeryeong, a member of the girl group Itzy.

== Career ==
=== 2013–2017: K-pop Star 3 and Sixteen ===
In 2013, Lee appeared as a contestant on the third season of K-pop Star alongside her sister Chaeryeong. Both were praised for their dancing skills and soon became trainees at JYP Entertainment. In 2015, the sisters participated in Mnet's reality girl group survival show Sixteen, which determined the lineup for the girl group Twice. After being eliminated in the third episode, she left JYP Entertainment and later joined WM Entertainment.

=== 2018–2021: Produce 48 and Iz*One ===
On June 15, 2018, Lee represented WM Entertainment on the girl group survival reality show Produce 48. As one of the twelve successful participants, she became a member of the newly formed South Korean-Japanese girl group Iz*One. The group officially debuted on October 29 with the release of their first EP, Color*Iz, and its lead single "La Vie en Rose". Iz*One won New Artist of the Year awards at several shows, including the Golden Disc Awards and the Seoul Music Awards.

Following the expiration of their contract, Iz*One disbanded on April 29, 2021.

=== 2021–2022: Post Iz*One activities and media appearances ===
On July 11, 2021, WM Entertainment announced that Lee would participate in the reality TV show Street Woman Fighter as one of the dance crew members. In September, it was revealed that Lee, along with former Iz*One members Jo Yu-ri and Kang Hye-won, would co-host a new web series titled Adola Travel Agency: Cheat-ing Trip. On December 13, she appeared alongside Kang Chan-hee in a short promotional video produced by the Busan Tourism Organization.

=== 2022–present: Solo career ===
On September 15, 2022, WM Entertainment announced that Lee would make her solo debut. She released her first EP, Hush Rush, along with the music video for its lead single of the same name, on October 12. On November 18, Chaeyeon and singer Ha Sung-woon officially released the duet "Talk To Me", which they originally performed at the 2024 K-World Dream Awards.

Lee released her second EP, Over the Moon, on April 23, 2023, which featured the lead single "Knock". The single peaked at number 26 on the Circle Digital Chart. On September 6, she released her first single album, The Move: Street, with the lead single "Let's Dance".

Her third EP, Showdown, was released on July 3, 2024, led by the single "Don't". On April 18, 2025, Lee made her television drama debut, starring in Let's Dance.

On September 12, 2025, Lee's contract with WM Entertainment was terminated by mutual agreement. Lee joined Day One Dream (DOD) Entertainment in December 2025.

In April 2026, Lee released her fourth mini-album, Till I Die, marking her first musical project under her new agency. The five-track EP was described as a deeply personal project that explores her emotions, vulnerabilities, and inner strength, centering on the moments she feels most alive on stage. The lead single, "No Tears on the Dancefloor", is a retro-inspired nu-disco dance-pop anthem that blends cinematic production with emotional storytelling, conveying a message of resilience and pushing forward through hardship. The album showcases a diverse musical spectrum, opening with "Know About Me", a Y2K-influenced hip-hop and R&B track featuring bold guitar riffs, followed by the dreamy electro dance-pop song "I'm Waiting". The tracklist is completed by the confident hip-hop dance track "Bad" and closes with "How Are You", a reflective electronic pop song layered with acoustic warmth. In promotional interviews, Lee noted that the album's visual aesthetic shifted to blue to represent a refreshing and powerful side, contrasting with her previous red-themed concepts. She emphasized that the project reflects her personal growth, gratitude, and happiness, aiming to deliver an intense and memorable performance experience for her fans, known as "Chaerish". In September, Lee announced her official debut in Japan with the release of her first single ボクノコエ ("Bokuno Koe; My Voice") under DOD Japan's newly established label D1 Records. The single features two tracks: the title song "Bokuno Koe", a J-rock influenced composition highlighting her vocal delivery, and "No Tears on the Dancefloor" (Japanese version), a re-recorded adaptation of her earlier Korean release. This marked the beginning of her full-scale music activities in Japan. The single was released on October 8, 2026.

== Discography ==
=== Extended plays ===
List of extended plays, showing selected details, selected chart positions, and sales figures
Title	Details	Peak chart positions	Sales
Title	Details	KOR	Sales
Hush Rush	Released: October 12, 2022; Label: WM Entertainment; Formats: CD, digital download, streaming	10	KOR: 36,589
Over the Moon	Released: April 12, 2023; Label: WM Entertainment; Formats: CD, digital download, streaming; Track listing: 1. "Intro: Line by Line"; 2. "Knock"; 3. "I Don't Wanna Know"; 4. "Don't Be a Jerk"; 5. "Like a Star"	9	KOR: 31,066
Showdown	Released: July 3, 2024; Label: WM Entertainment; Formats: CD, digital download, streaming; Track listing: 1. "Don't"; 2. "Summer Heat"; 3. "Supernatural"; 4. "Standing On My Own"; 5. "Dreaming"	26	KOR: 15,614
Till I Die	Released: April 28, 2026; Label: DOD Entertainment, Universal Music Korea; Formats: CD, digital download, streaming; Track listing: 1. "Know About Me"; 2. "No Tears on the Dancefloor"; 3. "I'm Waiting"; 4. "Bad"; 5. "How Are You"	30	KOR: 5,000

=== Single albums ===
List of single albums, showing selected details, selected chart positions, and sales figures
Title	Details	Peak chart positions	Sales
Title	Details	KOR	Sales
The Move: Street	Released: September 6, 2023; Label: WM Entertainment; Formats: CD, digital download, streaming; Track listing: 1. "Intro: Shangri-La"; 2. "Let's Dance"; 3. "Cave"	11	KOR: 19,351

=== Singles ===
==== Korean singles ====
List of Korean singles, showing year released, chart positions, and album name
Title	Year	Peak chart positions		Album
Title	Year	KOR	KOR Songs	Album
"Hush Rush"	2022	— (Note: "Hush Rush" did not enter the Circle Digital Chart, but appeared at number 33 on the component Download chart.)	—	Hush Rush
"Knock"	2023	26	13	Over the Moon
"Let's Dance"	2023	— (Note: "Let's Dance" did not enter the Circle Digital Chart, but appeared at number 33 on the component Download chart.)	—	The Move: Street
"Don't"	2024	— (Note: "Don't" did not enter the Circle Digital Chart, but appeared at number 42 on the component Download chart.)	—	Showdown
"Talk To Me" with Ha Sung-woon	2024	— (Note: "Talk To Me" did not enter the Circle Digital Chart, but appeared at number 78 on the component Download chart.)	—	Non-album single
"No Tears on the Dancefloor"	2026	— (Note: "No Tears on the Dancefloor" did not enter the Circle Digital Chart, but appeared at number 29 on the component Download chart.)	—	Till I Die
"—" denotes a recording that did not chart or was not released in that region.

==== Japanese single ====
List of Japanese singles, showing year released, chart positions, and album name
Title	Year	Peak chart positions	Album
Title	Year	JPN	Album
"My Voice" (ボクノコエ)	2026	59	Non-album single

=== Soundtrack appearances ===
List of soundtrack appearances, showing year released, and album name
Title	Year	Album
"Here I Stay"	2025	Fresh Romance OST
"Dumb"	2025	Where's My Hero? OST
"Just You" (with Xion)	2025	Fresh Romance OST
"Super Color" (with Minkyun)	2025	Spirit Fingers OST

=== Songwriting credits ===
All song credits are adapted from the Korea Music Copyright Association's database unless stated otherwise.

List of songs, showing year released, artist name, and name of the album
Title	Year	Artist	Album	Notes
"With*One"	2020	Iz*One	Oneiric Diary	As lyricist
"Like a Star"	2023	Herself	Over the Moon	As lyricist
"Don't"	2024	Herself	Showdown	As lyricist
"Dreaming"	2024	Herself	Showdown	As lyricist
"Dumb"	2025	Herself	Where's My Hero? OST	As lyricist
"No Tears on the Dancefloor"	2026	Herself	Till I Die	As lyricist

== Videography ==
=== Music videos ===
Title	Year	Director(s)	Ref.
"Hush Rush"	2022	Yoo Sung-kyun (Sunny Visual)	
"Knock"	2023	Kim Young-jo, Yoo Seung-woo (Naive)	
"Let's Dance"	2023	Kim Young-jo, Yoo Seung-woo (Naive)	
"Don't"	2024	Jimmy (Via Production)	
"No Tears On The Dancefloor"	2026	Lable (A·GROUND)	
"My Voice"	2026	Lee Sanghyeon (LSHF)	

== Filmography ==
=== Television series ===
Year	Title	Role	Notes	Ref.
2025	Let's Dance	Cheong-ah	One act-drama	

=== Web series ===
Year	Title	Role	Notes	Ref.
2021	Outsiders Love Prohibition	Soo-jin	One act-drama	
2025	Fresh Romance	Yoo Chae-rin		
2025	Looped in Love and Death	Kim Yoo-jung		

=== Television shows ===
Year	Title	Role	Notes	Ref.
2013–2014	K-pop Star 3	Contestant		
2015	Sixteen	Contestant		
2018	Produce 48	Contestant		
2021	Street Woman Fighter	Contestant		
2022	The Travelog	Cast member		
2023	Queendom Puzzle	Contestant	Withdrew	
2024	Kick a Goal	Cast member	Member of FC Top Girls	

=== Web shows ===
Year	Title	Role	Notes	Ref.
2021	Adola Travel Agency: Cheat-ing Trip	Cast member	Season 1 and 3	
2021	Get It Beauty K-BOX	Main host	with E-Tion	
2024	Inssadong Sulzzi	Main host		

=== Music video appearances ===
Year	Title	Artist	Ref.
2015	"Only You"	Miss A	

== Awards and nominations ==
Name of the award ceremony, year presented, award category, nominee(s) of the award, and the result of the nomination
Award ceremony	Year	Category	Nominee(s) / Work(s)	Result	Ref.
MAMA Awards	2023	Album of the Year	Over the Moon	Longlisted	
MAMA Awards	2023	Artist of the Year	Lee Chae-yeon	Longlisted	
MAMA Awards	2023	Best Dance Performance – Female Solo	"Knock"	Nominated	
MAMA Awards	2023	Song of the Year	"Knock"	Longlisted	
MAMA Awards	2023	Best Female Artist	Lee Chae-yeon	Nominated	
MAMA Awards	2023	Worldwide Fans' Choice Top 10	Lee Chae-yeon	Nominated	
SBS Entertainment Awards	2025	Rookie UP Award	Shooting Stars	Won	
