= Food Diary =

- Genre: Food reality television Variety show
- Starring: Seo Jang-hoon; Lee Soo-geun; BoA; Park Sung-kwang; YooA (Oh My Girl); Taeyong (NCT); Niklas Klabunde
- Country of origin: South Korea
- Original language: Korean
- No. of seasons: 1
- No. of episodes: 10

Production
- Executive producer: Lee Geun-chan
- Producer: Kim Geun-nan
- Production location: South Korea
- Production company: SM C&C

Original release
- Network: tvN
- Release: May 30 – August 8, 2018

Food Diary (Korean: 식량일기) is a South Korean television program produced by SM C&C and airs on tvN. It stars Seo Jang-hoon, Lee Soo-geun, BoA, Park Sung-kwang, YooA (Oh My Girl), Taeyong (NCT) and Niklas Klabunde.

The program aired on Wednesdays, with the first episode on May 30, 2018 at 21:30 (KST). From the second episode on June 6, 2018 the show will air at 23:00 (KST) and ended on August 8, 2018.

== Program ==
The program details the adventures of a cast of 'city farmers', who are in a city farm set up for them in order to prepare a dish by themselves from scratch - starting with the animals and the seeds. The dish they will be making is Dak-bokkeum-tang.

== Cast ==
- Seo Jang-hoon
- Lee Soo-geun
- BoA
- Park Sung-kwang
- YooA (Oh My Girl)
- Taeyong (NCT)
- Niklas Klabunde

== Episodes ==
=== Dak-bokkeum-tang ===
| Episode # | Broadcast Date | Note(s) |
|---|---|---|
| 1 | May 30, 2018 | Special appearances by Chin Jung-kwon and Choi Hoon (Kangwon National University cultural studies professor) |
| 2 | June 6, 2018 | |
| 3 | June 13, 2018 | Special appearance by Hwang Gyo-ik |
| 4 | June 20, 2018 | Special appearance by Park So-yeon (Animal protection group representative) |
| — | June 27, 2018 | Special Episode |
| 5 | July 4, 2018 | |
| 6 | July 11, 2018 | |
| 7 | July 18, 2018 | Special appearance by Lee Kye-in |
| 8 | July 25, 2018 | Special appearances by Oh My Girl (Hyojung, Seunghee, Binnie) |
| 9 | August 1, 2018 | Special appearances by Lee Kye-in, Jang Ki-young, Oh Na-mi, Heechul (Super Junior) |
| 10 | August 8, 2018 | |

== Ratings ==
In the ratings below, the highest rating for the show will be in red, and the lowest rating for the show will be in blue each year.

| Ep. # | Broadcast date | Average audience share | | |
| Ep. # | Broadcast date | AGB Nielsen | | TNmS Ratings |
| Ep. # | Broadcast date | Nationwide | Seoul Capital Area | Nationwide |
|---|---|---|---|---|
| 1 | May 30, 2018 | 1.242% | NR | 1.8% |
| 2 | June 6, 2018 | 1.054% | NR | 1.476% |
| 3 | June 13, 2018 | 1.610% | 1.874% | NR |
| 4 | June 20, 2018 | 0.851% | NR | NR |
| Special | June 27, 2018 | 0.539% | NR | NR |
| 5 | July 4, 2018 | 0.873% | 1.186% | NR |
| 6 | July 11, 2018 | 0.997% | NR | NR |
| 7 | July 18, 2018 | 0.879% | NR | NR |
| 8 | July 25, 2018 | 0.957% | NR | NR |
| 9 | August 1, 2018 | 0.913% | NR | NR |
| 10 | August 8, 2018 | 0.723% | NR | NR |

- Note that the show airs on a cable channel (pay TV), which plays part in its slower uptake and relatively small audience share when compared to programs broadcast (FTA) on public networks such as KBS, SBS, MBC or EBS.
- NR rating means "not reported".
- TNmS have stopped publishing their rating report from June 2018.
