= Xlov =

South Korean musical group

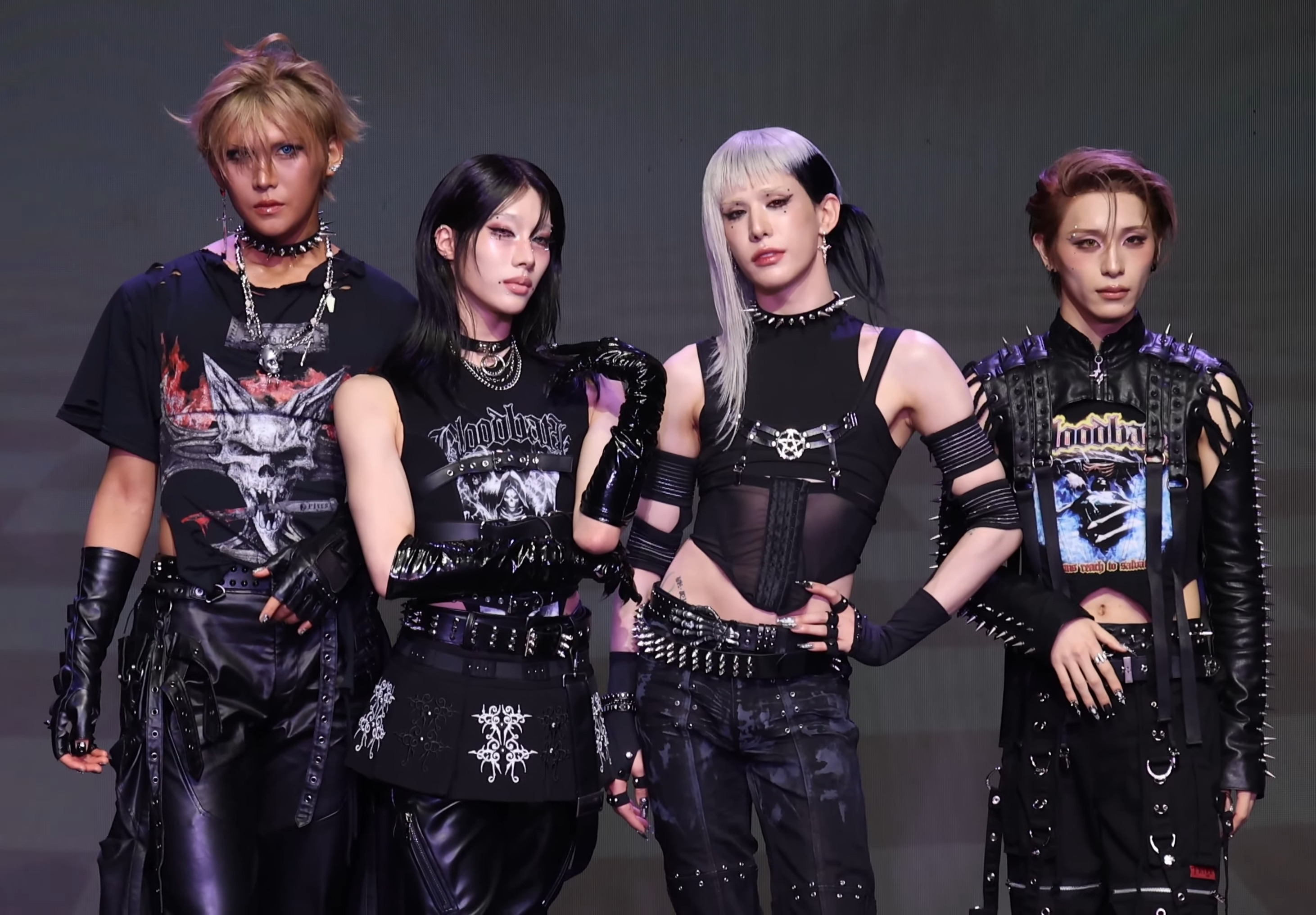
- Xlov in May 2026; Left to right: Hyun, Rui, Wumuti, Haru

Background information
- Origin: Seoul, South Korea
- Genres: Hip hop; R&B
- Years active: 2025–present
- Labels: StrangeLab; 257
- Members: Wumuti; Rui; Hyun; Haru

Xlov (Korean: 엑스러브; stylized in all caps) is a South Korean musical group formed by StrangeLab Inc. (formerly 257 Entertainment). The group was previously managed by WM Entertainment, which integrated with 257 Entertainment in August 2026. The group consists of four members: Wumuti, Rui, Hyun, and Haru. They debuted on January 7, 2025, with their single album I'mma Be. With a "genderless" concept, the group is known for their androgynous style and themes of being one's authentic self.

== History ==
=== Pre-debut and other activities ===
In 2015, Wumuti participated and won the first season of MBC Music's reality competition series Super Idol, debuting as a member of Swin. They then participated in three reality programs: MBC's Under Nineteen in 2018, Mnet's Boys Planet and Build Up: Vocal Boy Group Survival in 2023 and 2024, respectively. Following Build Up, Wumuti was active as a member of the project group Waterfire. In 2024, Wumuti made their solo debut with the single "You Make Me Better".

Haru and Rui, then going by their full name Chen Kuanjui, participated alongside Wumuti as individual trainees in Mnet's Boys Planet in 2023.

=== 2025–present: Debut and EP releases ===
Logo of Xlov

In December 2024, 257 Entertainment announced that Xlov would be debuting on January 7, 2025, and revealed the members' lineup: Wumuti, Rui, Hyun, and Haru. The group name is a combination of "X", which represents the unknown and negation, and "lov", which represents unfinished love, with different forms and meanings. The group's theme is "genderless concept".

On January 7, 2025, Xlov made their debut with the single album I'mma Be and its lead single of the same name. On March 2, 2025, Xlov began their first tour in Japan, "-X:On1y-", with 23 performances in Tokyo and Osaka.

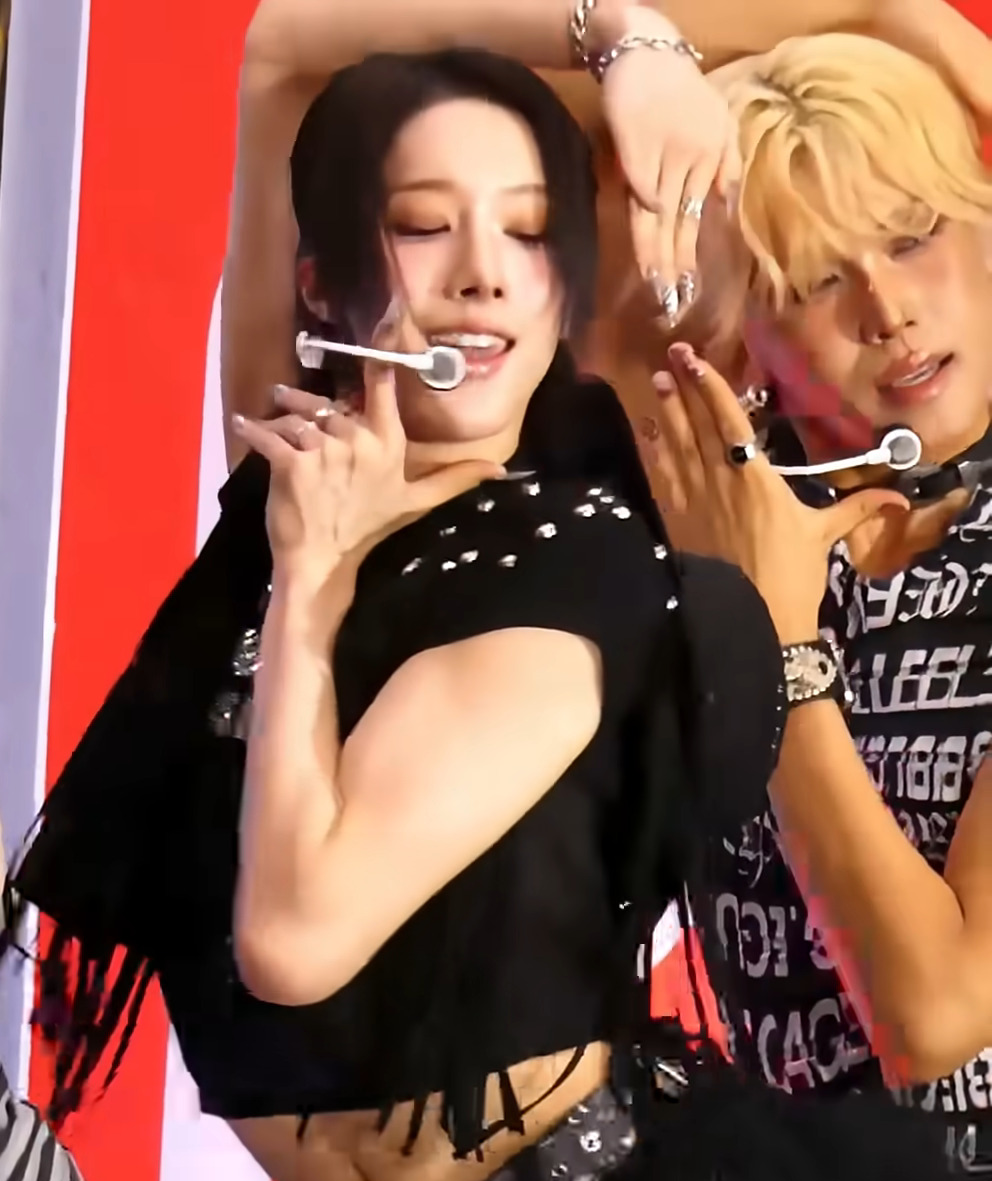
Rui and Hyun performing "1&Only" in 2025

Xlov released their second single album, I One, on June 13, 2025. The album includes "1&Only", "1 of Lov", "Bizness", and instrumental versions of each track. To mark their first comeback, they released a new logo which depicted their debut logo engulfed in flames. Xlov held their second tour in Japan, "XXXX:-P", on August 29, with eight stops in Tokyo and three in Yokohama. The group released their first extended play (EP), Uxlxve, on November 5, 2025. The album includes six tracks for the streaming version, and nine for the CD version, of which three are instrumental versions of songs on the album.

The group's second EP, I, God, was released on May 27, 2026, with its lead single "Serve". Aani Nagaiah of Complex featured "Serve" as one of the top K-pop songs of 2026 so far, emphasizing their homage to queer ballroom culture. On October 28, 2026, Xlov released their third EP, i=! (pronounced "i equals i"), featuring the lead tracks "Hush" and "Tooth Gem Chiwawa".

== Public image ==
Xlov debuted in 2025 with the slogan "K-pop's first genderless concept". In a 2025 interview, the group stated:

When we say 'genderless,' we think it might be a little difficult for English-speaking fans to fully grasp. By 'genderless,' we aim to break stereotypes that suggest only certain genders can do this or that. The art we express is 'gender-free,' and we hope it empowers more people to embrace their true selves and pursue who they want to be.

All members of the group wear androgynous clothing; the music video for "I'mma Be" features members wearing both skirts and pants. Xlov's leader Wumuti has stated that the genderless concept was not chosen for attention but is rather a reflection of the group members themselves. Wumuti said, "The genderless or gender-free concept we're best known for is part of the lifestyle we would like to show the world. I believe it is more about how I want to present myself to the world." In an interview with People magazine, Wumuti said, "Our goal has never been to force people to think in a certain way. We simply want to share our perspectives and our art and invite people to see the world from a different point of view.

== Members ==
- Wumuti (우무티) – leader
- Rui (루이)
- Hyun (현)
- Haru (하루)

== Discography ==
=== Extended plays ===
List of extended plays, showing selected details, selected chart positions, and sales figures
Title	Details	Peak chart positions		Sales	Certifications
Title	Details	KOR	US Curr.	Sales	Certifications
Uxlxve	Released: November 5, 2025; Label: 257 Entertainment, Quarter Music; Formats: CD, digital download, streaming; Track listing: 1. "Scent"; 2. "Rizz"; 3. "Dirty Baby"; 4. "Biii:-P; 5. "Kiss and say Goodbye"; 6. "Drip Drip"	7	44	KOR: 181,010	
I, God	Released: May 27, 2026; Label: WM Entertainment; Formats: CD, digital download, streaming; Track listing: 1. "法則:The Rules"; 2. "Serve"; 3. "Extancy" (Wumuti and Rui); 4. "Back 2 Back"; 5. "Hips" (Hyun and Haru); 6. "Masterpiece"; 7. "Serve" (instrumental)	3	—	KOR: 256,874	KPIA: Platinum
i=!	Released: October 28, 2026; Label: StrangeLab; Formats: CD, digital download, streaming; Track listing: 1. "Cat Move"; 2. "Hush"; 3. "All Tied Up" (Rui and Haru); 4. "Tooth Gem Chiwawa"; 5. "Silence" (Wumuti and Hyun); 6. "Tooth Gem Chiwawa" (sped up); 7. "Hush" (instrumental); 8. "Tooth Gem Chiwawa" (instrumental)	5	—	KOR: 134,003	
"—" denotes releases that did not chart.

=== Single albums ===
List of albums, showing selected details, selected chart positions, and sales figures
Title	Details	Peak chart positions	Sales
Title	Details	KOR	Sales
I'mma Be	Released: January 7, 2025; Label: 257 Entertainment, Quarter Music; Formats: CD, digital download, streaming; Track listing: 1. "I'mma Be"; 2. "I'mma Be" (instrumental); 3. "I'mma Be" (88 Techno remix); 4. "I'mma Be" (Dark House remix)	11	KOR: 22,342
I One	Released: June 13, 2025; Label: 257 Entertainment, Quarter Music; Formats: CD, digital download, streaming; Track listing: 1. "1&Only"; 2. "1 of Lov"; 3. "Bizness"; 4. "1&Only" (instrumental); 5. "1 of Lov" (instrumental); 6. "Bizness" (instrumental)	11	KOR: 83,268

=== Singles ===
List of singles, showing year released, and name of the album
Title	Year	Peak chart positions		Album
Title	Year	KOR DL	NZ Hot	Album
"I'mma Be"	2025	—		I'mma Be
"1&Only"	2025	—	40	I One
"Rizz"	2025	—	—	Uxlxve
"Biii:-P"	2025	173	—	Uxlxve
"Serve"	2026	164	—	I, God
"Hush"	2026	68	—	i=!
"Tooth Gem Chiwawa"	2026	—		i=!
"—" denotes releases that did not chart.

=== Music videos ===
Title	Year	Director
"I'mma Be"	2025	Hur Yeeun
"1&Only"	2025	Heesuk Che & Hur Yeeun
"Rizz"	2025	Jeon Woojin (Zeroback Film)
"Biii:-P"	2025	DQ Kim (Roofless Film)
"Serve"	2026	Gustavo Ku (Third Eye Video)
"Hush"	2026	Kang Mingi (AArch Film)
"Tooth Gem Chiwawa"	2026	Unknown

== Awards and nominations ==
Name of the award ceremony, year presented, category, nominee of the award, and the result of the nomination
Award ceremony	Year	Category	Nominee / Work	Result	Ref.
K-World Dream Awards	2026	Global Next Leader	Xlov	Won	
Mega Champ Awards	2025	iMBC Hot Star	Xlov	Won	

== Concert tours ==
=== Xlov 1st Premium Tour in Japan "-X:On1y-" ===
List of concert dates
Date	City	Country	Venue
Mar 2, 2025	Tokyo	Japan	J-Stage O!
Mar 4, 2025	Tokyo	Japan	J-Stage O!
Mar 5, 2025	Tokyo	Japan	J-Stage O!
Mar 7, 2025	Tokyo	Japan	J-Stage O!
Mar 8, 2025	Tokyo	Japan	J-Stage O!
Mar 9, 2025	Tokyo	Japan	J-Stage O!
Mar 11, 2025	Tokyo	Japan	J-Stage O!
Mar 12, 2025	Tokyo	Japan	J-Stage O!
Mar 13, 2025	Tokyo	Japan	J-Stage O!
Mar 15, 2025	Osaka	Japan	Pluswin Hall Osaka
Mar 16, 2025	Osaka	Japan	Pluswin Hall Villeboa
Mar 18, 2025	Osaka	Japan	Pluswin Hall Villeboa
Mar 19, 2025	Osaka	Japan	Pluswin Hall Villeboa
Mar 20, 2025	Osaka	Japan	Pluswin Hall Villeboa
Mar 22, 2025	Tokyo	Japan	J-Stage O!
Mar 23, 2025	Tokyo	Japan	J-Stage O!
Mar 25, 2025	Tokyo	Japan	J-Stage O!
Mar 26, 2025	Tokyo	Japan	J-Stage O!
Mar 28, 2025	Tokyo	Japan	J-Stage O!
Mar 29, 2025	Tokyo	Japan	J-Stage O!
Mar 30, 2025	Tokyo	Japan	K-Stage O!

=== Xlov Japan Live 2025 Summer "XXXX:-P" ===
List of concert dates
Date	City	Country	Venue
Aug 29, 2025	Tokyo	Japan	K-Stage O!
Aug 30, 2025	Tokyo	Japan	K-Stage O!
Sep 2, 2025	Yokohama	Japan	Yokohama YTJ Hall
Sep 3, 2025	Yokohama	Japan	Yokohama YTJ Hall
Sep 5, 2025	Yokohama	Japan	Yokohama YTJ Hall
Sep 7, 2025	Tokyo	Japan	K-Stage O!
Sep 9, 2025	Tokyo	Japan	Shibuya Dive
Sep 10, 2025	Tokyo	Japan	K-Stage O!
Sep 13, 2025	Tokyo	Japan	K-Stage O!
Sep 14, 2025	Tokyo	Japan	K-Stage O!
Sep 15, 2025	Tokyo	Japan	K-Stage O!

=== 2026 Xlov Europe Tour "L.O.V.E & u" ===
List of concert dates
Date	City	Country	Venue
Jan 26, 2026	Helsinki	Finland	Kulttuuritalo
Jan 28, 2026	Madrid	Spain	The Lenovo Garage
Jan 30, 2026	Warsaw	Poland	Progresja
Jan 31, 2026	Renens	Switzerland	Salle de Spectacles
Feb 1, 2026	Milan	Italy	Magazzini Generali
Feb 4, 2026	Athens	Greece	Universe Multivenue
Feb 6, 2026	Sophia	Bulgaria	Joy Station
Feb 7, 2026	Bucharest	Romania	Sala Palatului
Feb 8, 2026	London	United Kingdom	Troxy
Feb 11, 2026	Wolverhampton	United Kingdom	Wolverhampton Civic Hall
Feb 12, 2026	Manchester	United Kingdom	Academy 1
Feb 14, 2026	Paris	France	Salle Pleyel
Feb 16, 2026 (Note: Rescheduled from February 15.)	Copenhagen	Denmark	Poolen
Feb 17, 2026	Reykjavík	Iceland	Gamla Bíó
Feb 19, 2026	Amsterdam	Netherlands	Panama
Feb 21, 2026	Mainz	Germany	K-Pop Revolution Festival
Feb 22, 2026	Mainz	Germany	K-Pop Revolution Festival
