= I (singer) =

- 차윤지
- Born: Cha Yoon-ji; December 2, 1996 (age 29); Gwangju, South Korea
- Occupations: Singer; dancer
- Relatives: Baro (brother)
- Musical career
- Genres: K-pop
- Instrument: Vocals
- Years active: 2017–present
- Label: WM Entertainment (2017–2018)

Korean name
- Hangul: 차윤지
- Hanja: 車允智
- RR: Cha Yunji
- MR: Ch'a Yunji

Cha Yoon-ji (Korean: 차윤지; born December 2, 1996), better known by her stage name I (아이), is a South Korean singer and dancer formerly under WM Entertainment. She officially debuted on January 12, 2017 with her debut EP, I Dream. She joined The Unit: Idol Rebooting Project in October 2017, but she left the show on November 24 due to health issues.

== Personal life ==
Cha was born in Gwangju and is the younger sister of Baro, a former member of B1A4.

== Discography ==
=== Extended plays ===
Title	Album details	Peak chart positions	Sales
Title	Album details	KOR Gaon	Sales
I Dream	Released: January 12, 2017; Label: WM Entertainment, CJ E&M Music; Formats: CD, digital download	18	KOR: 1,822+
"—" denotes releases that did not chart or were not released in that region.

=== Singles ===
Title	Year	Peak chart positions		Sales	Album
Title	Year	KOR	US World	Sales	Album
"I Wish" (간절히 바라면 이뤄질 거야)	2017	—	—	—	I Dream

== Filmography ==
=== Television shows ===
Year	Title	Network	Notes
2017	The Unit	KBS	Contestant
