= We Must Love =

EP by ONF
- Released: February 7, 2019
- Recorded: 2018–2019
- Genre: Dance
- Length: 15:35
- Language: Korean
- Label: WM Entertainment; Stone Music
- Producer: MonoTree; Woodz

ONF chronology
You Complete Me (2018)	We Must Love (2019)	Go Live (2019)

Singles from We Must Love
- 1. "We Must Love" Released: February 7, 2019

Music video
- "We Must Love" on YouTube

We Must Love is the third extended play from South Korean–Japanese boy group ONF. It was released on February 7, 2019 by WM Entertainment and distributed by Stone Music Entertainment. Consisted of five dominantly EDM and dance-pop tracks, the extended play was produced and written mostly by production team MonoTree, with member MK and Wyatt contributed lyrically. Upon its release, We Must Love became the group's longest charting release to date on the Gaon Album Chart, peaking at number five for one week and stayed for fourteen consecutive weeks on the chart, eventually became the twenty-fourth best selling release of February 2019. It was also the group's last release to feature founding member Laun, whom left the group six months after its release.

To further promote the extended play, ONF released its eponymous title track as the lead single from the extended play and proceeded with their first Asian tour with the same name in March 2019. Though uncharted, "We Must Love" has since become the group's signature song and one of their most recognized tunes.

== Background and release ==
On January 28, 2019, WM Entertainment announced that ONF would release their third extended play on February 7, 2019, marking the group's first music release following their second Japanese single "Complete" in September 2018, and subsequently their first Korean release in eight months following You Complete Me in June 2018. In addition, the label unveiled ONF's teaser images on their official social media platforms, portraying a half-open image in a pink envelope stamped with ON and OFF (ONF) stamps and contains a big letter with the message "#ㅅㄹㅎㄱㄷㄱㅇ", which was the Korean abbreviation for their upcoming album title. Two days later, WM Entertainment unveiled the first group pyro-photograph with all members wearing black and red costume, showcasing a "dark" and more "mature" image transition from their previous "bubbly" and "bright" images. The entire tracklist was then revealed on February 1. The label then released both "We Must Love" and its parental extended play on all South Korean digital platforms on February 7, while the physical edition was released a day later.

== Promotion ==
Following the release of We Must Love, the group held an album showcase at the K-Art Hall at Olympic Park, Seoul, where they performed live the title track and "Yayaya" for the first time. ONF then started their initial promotion on various South Korean television music programs, starting with their appearance on KBS's Music Bank on February 8 and followed by performances on The Show, Show! Music Core, M Countdown and Show Champion. The group then expanded their promotion with "We Must Love Asia Tour 2019", their first Asian tour since the group's debut in March and April, and later participated at the KCON Japan 2019 music festival on May 18, 2019. The title track was then sampled and eventually re-arranged for the group's participation in Road to Kingdom, the male counterpart reality television program of Queendom that features seven rising boy groups competing with live performances of their previous singles and new recording.

== Track listing ==
Credits adapted from the liner notes of We Must Love.

No.	Title	Lyrics	Music	Arrangement	Length
1.	"사랑하게 될 거야 (We Must Love)"	황현 (MonoTree)	황현 (MonoTree)	황현 (MonoTree)	3:11
2.	"Ice & Fire"	박지연 (MonoTree); WYATT (온앤오프)	G-high (MonoTree); TOTEM; Woodz	G-high (MonoTree)	3:44
3.	"별일 아냐 (Yayaya)"	MK(온앤오프); WYATT(온앤오프); 황현 (MonoTree)	황현; NOPARI; 최영경 (MonoTree)	황현 (MonoTree)	3:10
4.	"첫 사랑의 법칙 (Happily never after)"	이주형 (MonoTree); WYATT(온앤오프); MK(온앤오프)	이주형; NOPARI (MonoTree)	NOPARI (MonoTree)	2:57
5.	"I Do"	황현 (MonoTree); WYATT (온앤오프)	황현; NOPARI (MonoTree)	황현; NOPARI (MonoTree)	3:13
Total length:					15:35

== Charts ==
=== Weekly chart ===
Chart (2019)	Peak position
South Korea (Gaon Album Chart)	5

=== Monthly chart ===
Chart (2019)	Peak position
South Korea (Gaon Album Chart)	24

== Release history ==
Country	Date	Distributing label	Format
South Korea	February 7, 2019	Stone Music Entertainment; WM Entertainment	CD, digital download
Various	February 7, 2019	Stone Music Entertainment; WM Entertainment	CD, digital download
