= On/Off (ONF EP) =

ON/OFF

EP by ONF
- Released: August 2, 2017
- Recorded: 2017
- Genre: Dance
- Length: 16:28
- Language: Korean
- Label: WM Entertainment; Stone Music Entertainment
- Producer: MonoTree

ONF chronology
ON/OFF (2017)	You Complete Me (2018)

Singles from ON/OFF
- 1. "ON/OFF" Released: August 2, 2017

Music video
- "ON/OFF" on YouTube

On/Off (stylized as ON/OFF) is the first and debut EP by the South Korean boy group, ONF under WM Entertainment. The album was released on August 2, 2017, which consisted of five title tracks with the main title track "ON/OFF" same with the name of EP.

== Background and release ==
On July 25, 2017,WM Entertainment released the first teaser image of "ON/OFF" debut album. On July 26, 2017, the album's tracklist of the group's debut album was released. On July 27, 2017, WM Entertainment announced the upcoming debut of 7 members names and the personal teaser image of "ON/OFF" group's debut album was released. On July 28, 2017, The highlight medley for the album was released. On July 30, 2017, the music video teaser for the debut song "ON/OFF" was released.

== Commercial performance ==
"ON/OFF" debuted at number 9 on the Gaon Album Chart, on the chart issue dated July 30 - August 5, 2017. The EP placed at number 24 on the chart for the month of August 2017, with 7,390 physical copies sold.

== Track listing ==
No.	Title	Lyrics	Music	Arrangement	Length
1.	"ON/OFF" (Title)	와이엇(Wyatt); 황현(MonoTree)	NOPARI(MonoTree); 황현(MonoTree)	NOPARI; 황현(MonoTree)	3:11
2.	"Difficult"	황현(MonoTree)	황현(MonoTree); Paulo Jonson	황현(MonoTree)	3:06
3.	"If We Dream"	이주형(MonoTree)	이주형(MonoTree)	이주형(MonoTree)	3:41
4.	"Original"	GDLO(MonoTree)	GDLO(MonoTree)	GDLO(MonoTree)	3:12
5.	"Cat's Waltz"	황현(MonoTree); WYATT (온앤오프); 신아녜스	황현(MonoTree); NOPARI(MonoTree)	황현(MonoTree); NOPARI(MonoTree)	3:18
Total length:					16:28

== Charts ==
=== Weekly charts ===
Chart (2017)	Peak position
South Korean Albums (Gaon)	9

=== Monthly charts ===
Chart (2017)	Peak position
South Korean Albums (Gaon)	24

== Release history ==
Country	Date	Distributing label	Format
South Korea	August 2, 2017	Stone Music Entertainment; WM Entertainment	CD, digital download
Various	August 2, 2017	Stone Music Entertainment; WM Entertainment	CD, digital download
