= Bon Voyage (EP) =

EP by YooA
- Released: September 7, 2020
- Genre: K-pop; Tropical house; synth-pop
- Length: 17:46
- Label: WM

YooA chronology
Bon Voyage (2020)	Selfish (2022)

Singles from Bon Voyage
- 1. "Bon Voyage" Released: September 7, 2020

Music video
- "Bon Voyage" on YouTube

Bon Voyage is the debut solo extended play (EP) by South Korean singer YooA of the girl group Oh My Girl. It was released by WM Entertainment on September 7, 2020. The album consists of five songs, including the title track of the same name.

== Background and release ==
On August 25, Newsen reported that YooA was preparing to release a solo album in September, and WM Entertainment confirmed that YooA would make her solo debut with the release of a mini album on September 7. On August 28, YooA shared a first look of her solo debut on YouTube through an opening trailer titled "Bon Voyage".

On September 7, the mini album was released, and a music video for the title track of the same name was released alongside it. YooA also held an online showcase to celebrate the release of her first mini album.

== Promotions ==
YooA promoted the mini album by performing on several music shows, including Show! Music Core, Inkigayo, The Show, M Countdown, and Music Bank.

== Track listing ==
Bon Voyage track listing
No.	Title	Lyrics	Music	Arrangement	Length
1.	"Bon Voyage" (숲의 아이)	Seo Ji-eum	Afshin Salmani; Josh Cumbee; Ryan S. Jhun; Shari Short; Josephina Carr	Afsheen; Josh Cumbee; Ryan S. Jhun	3:40
2.	"Far" (날 찾아서)	Seo Ji-eum	Ryan S. Jhun; Martina Ahlmark; Dennis DeKo Kordnejad; Kavin KMan Mansoor; Hanif Hitmanic Sabzevari	Ryan S. Jhun; Dennis DeKo Kordnejad; Dennis DeKo Kordnejad	3:28
3.	"Diver"	Seo Jeong-ah	Adam Kapit; Anesha Birchett; Antea Shelton; Fredro Odesjo	Adam Kapit	3:41
4.	"Abracadabra" (자각몽)	Seo Jeong-ah	Ryan S. Jhun; Lukas Hällgren; Jon Hällgren; Maria Broberg; Grace Gachotsaka	Ryan S. Jhun; Lukas Hällgren; Jon Hällgren	3:20
5.	"End Of Story"	Seo Ji-eum	Lee Ju-hyeong (MonoTree); Mayu Wakisaka	Lee Ju-hyeong (MonoTree)	3:45
Total length:					17:46

== Charts ==
Chart (2020)	Peak position
South Korean Albums (Gaon)	3

== Accolades ==
Music program awards
Program	Date	Ref.
The Show	September 15, 2020	
