= YooA =

South Korean singer and actress (born 1995)

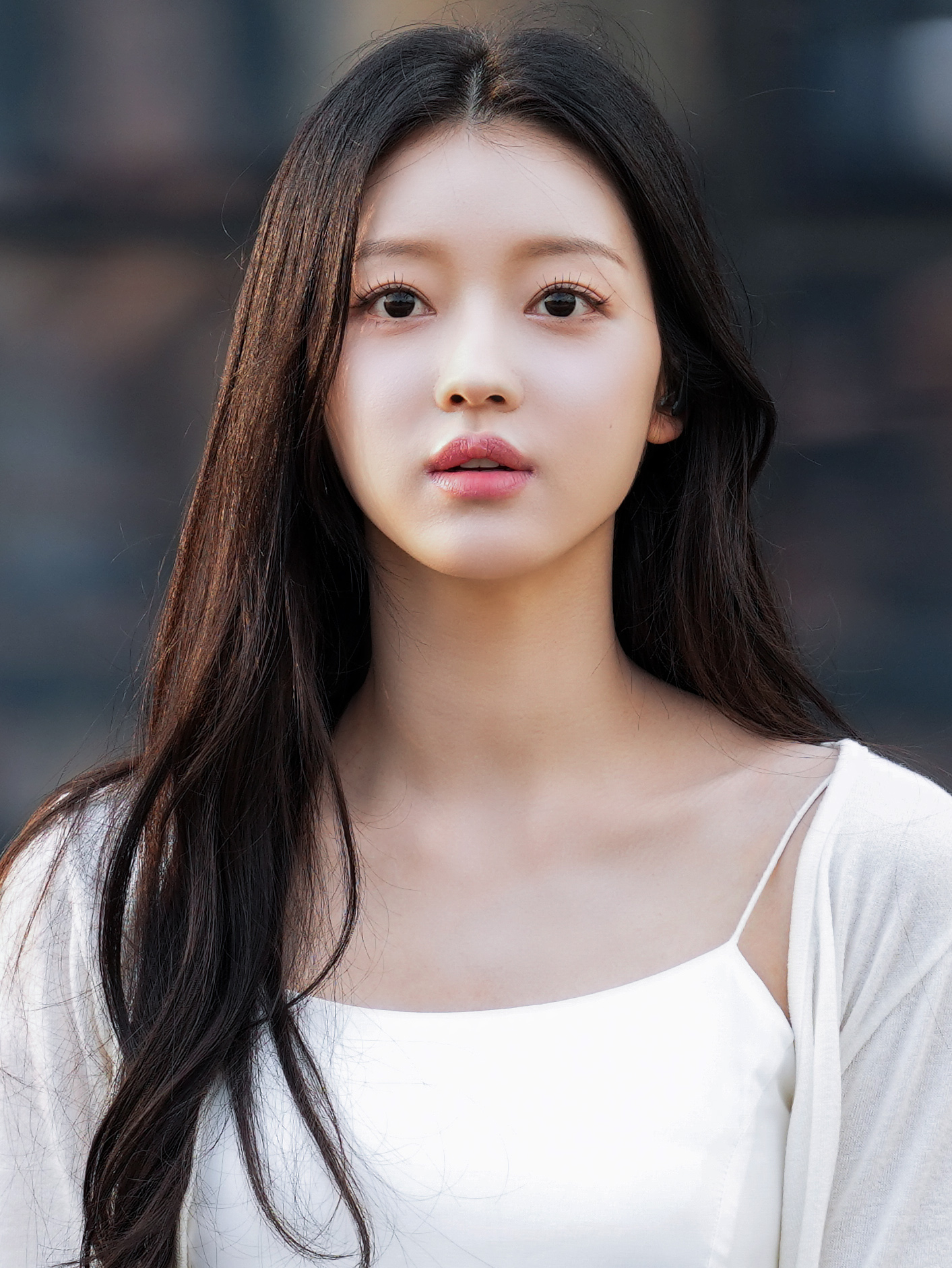
- YooA in 2024
- Born: Yoo Yeon-joo; September 17, 1995 (age 31); Seoul, South Korea
- Occupations: Singer; actress
- Agent: Ringcomz
- Musical career
- Genre: K-pop
- Instrument: Vocals
- Years active: 2015–present
- Labels: WM; DSP
- Member of: Oh My Girl
- Formerly of: Girls Next Door

Korean name
- Hangul: 유시아
- Hanja: 柳諟我
- RR: Yu Sia
- MR: Yu Sia

Stage name
- Hangul: 유아
- RR: Yua
- MR: Yua

Former name
- Hangul: 유연주
- RR: Yu Yeonju
- MR: Yu Yŏnju

Yoo Si-ah (Korean: 유시아; born Yoo Yeon-joo on September 17, 1995), known professionally as YooA (유아), is a South Korean singer and actress. She is a member of the girl group Oh My Girl under DSP Media. She made her debut as a solo artist, with her first EP Bon Voyage, on September 7, 2020.

== Early life ==
YooA was born Yoo Yeon-joo on September 17, 1995, in Sinchang-dong, Yongsan-gu, Seoul, South Korea, and legally changed her name to Yoo Si-ah.

Her older brother is a dancer and choreographer at the 1Million Dance Studio.

== Career ==
=== 2015–2020: Debut with Oh My Girl and other activities ===
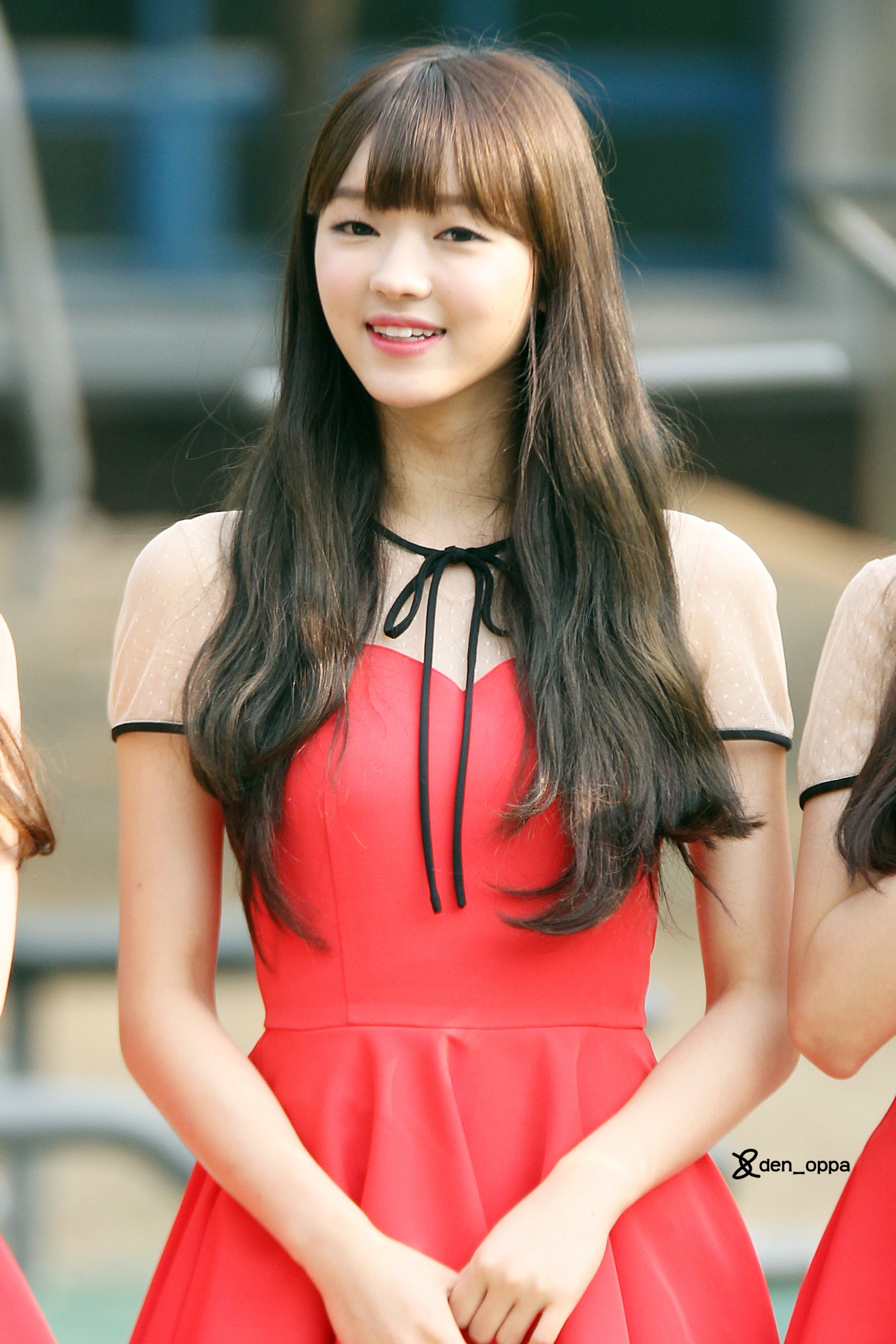
YooA in 2015

On April 20, 2015, YooA debuted in the South Korean girl group Oh My Girl. In August 2016, YooA took part in the Mnet dance TV show Hit the Stage with U-Kwon of Block B as her partner. They finished in fourth place behind her brother and his partner Hyoyeon. In November 2016, she debuted as a member of the Inkigayo project group, Sunny Girls, with the single, "Taxi". On April 10, 2017, YooA joined the reality show Idol Drama Operation Team. On June 14, 2017, They made their debut as Girls Next Door(옆집소녀) with the single, "Deep Blue Eyes".

In May 2018, YooA released the single "Morning Call".

=== 2020–present: Bon Voyage. Selfish and Borderline ===
On September 7, 2020, YooA made her solo debut with the extended play Bon Voyage. On September 15, 2020, YooA received her first music show trophy on The Show. On September 25, 2020, YooA released an OST for the Netflix film Over The Moon.

In October 2022, WM Entertainment announced that YooA was preparing new music. She released the four-track EP Selfish on November 14, with a lead single of the same name. On March 14, 2024, YooA released her first single album Borderline, with the lead single "Rooftop". On June 2, 2025, YooA departed WM Entertainment and signed a contract with Saram Entertainment as an actress. On September 3, 2026, after about a year, she left Saram Entertainment and signed an exclusive contract with a new agency, Ringcomz.

== Discography ==
=== Extended plays ===
Title	Details	Peak chart positions	Sales
Title	Details	KOR	Sales
Bon Voyage	Released: September 7, 2020; Label: WM Entertainment; Formats: CD, digital download, streaming	3	KOR: 27,281
Selfish	Released: November 14, 2022; Label: WM Entertainment; Formats: CD, digital download, streaming; Track listing: 1. "Selfish"; 2. "Lay Low"; 3. "Blood Moon"; 4. "Melody"	14	KOR: 21,639

=== Single albums ===
Title	Details	Peak chart positions	Sales
Title	Details	KOR	Sales
Borderline	Released: March 14, 2024; Label: WM Entertainment; Formats: CD, digital download, streaming; Track listing: 1. "Rooftop"; 2. "Love Myself"; 3. "Shooting Star"	20	KOR: 13,070

=== Singles ===
Title	Year	Peak chart positions		Album
Title	Year	KOR	KOR Hot	Album
As lead artist
"Morning Call" (모닝콜) (Produced by Peterpan Complex)	2018	—	—	Morning Call
"Bon Voyage" (숲의 아이)	2020	44	16	Bon Voyage
"Lay Low"	2022	— (Note: "Lay Low" did not enter Circle Digital Chart, but debuted and peaked at number 51 on the Download Chart.)	—	Selfish
"Melody"	2022	— (Note: "Melody" did not enter Circle Digital Chart, but debuted and peaked at number 54 on the Download Chart.)	—	Selfish
"Selfish"	2022	184	—	Selfish
"Rooftop"	2024	—	—	Borderline
Collaborations
"Taxi" (with Sunny Girls)	2016	—	—	Inkigayo Music Crush Part 2
"This Stop Is" (with Hui and Wooseok)	2018	—	—	Gag-Singer Producer - Streaming
"—" denotes releases that did not chart or were not released in that region

=== Soundtrack appearances ===
Title	Year	Album
"Deep Blue Eyes" (with Girls Next Door)	2017	Idol Drama Operation Team OST
"Rocket to the Moon! " (로켓 투 더 문!)	2020	Over the Moon OST
"Stay With Me"	2020	Tale of the Nine Tailed OST

== Videography ==
=== Music videos ===
Title	Year	Director	Ref.
"Bon Voyage"	2020	Sunny Visual	
"Lay Low"	2022	Sunny Visual	
"Melody"	2022	Sunny Visual	
"Selfish"	2022	Sunny Visual	
"Rooftop"	2024	Kim In-tae (AFF)	

== Filmography ==
=== Film ===
Year	Title	Role	Ref.
2025	Project Y	Ha Kyung	

=== Television shows ===
Year	Title	Role	Notes	Ref.
2017	Idol Drama Operation Team	Cast member		
2018	King of Mask Singer	Contestant	as A Little Princess (Episode 143)	
2018	Food Diary	Cast member		
2020	Running Girls	Cast member		
2022	Fantastic Family	Judge		

=== Hosting ===
Year	Title	Notes	Ref.
2021	SBS 2021 Super Concert in Daegu	With Jeon So-mi and Yunho	

== Awards and nominations ==
Name of the award ceremony, year presented, category, nominee of the award, and the result of the nomination
Award ceremony	Year	Category	Nominee / Work	Result	Ref.
Gaon Chart Music Awards	2021	Artist of the Year – Digital Music	"Bon Voyage"	Nominated	
