= Spin Off (EP) =

EP by ONF
- Released: August 10, 2020
- Recorded: 2020
- Genre: K-pop; Dance
- Length: 23:32
- Language: Korean
- Label: WM Entertainment; Stone Music Entertainment
- Producer: MonoTree; MK; Wyatt

ONF chronology
Go Live (2019)	Spin Off (2020)	ONF: My Name (2021)

Music video
- "Sukhumvit Swimming" on YouTube

Spin Off (stylized all caps) is the fifth extended play by South Korean–Japanese boy group ONF, released on August 10, 2020, by WM Entertainment and distributed by Stone Music Entertainment. The EP contains seven tracks, featuring title track "Sukhumvit Swimming" and "New World - SPIN OFF Version," the original track used for their final performance on Road to Kingdom. ONF's fifth mini-album sold 17,680 copies on its release date, nearly double the amount of sales from their previous mini-album Go Live. Spin Off reached number 3 on the weekly Gaon Album Chart. Their lead single "Sukhumvit Swimming" reached number 102 on the Gaon Digital Chart. On January 15, 2021 "Sukhumvit Swimming MV" hit 10 million views on YouTube, making it ONF's first MV to reach that milestone.

== Background and release ==
On July 27, 2020, WM Entertainment announced ONF's upcoming comeback to be on August 10, 2020. Following teaser photos were released over the next weeks, with the mini-album's title to be Spin Off and "Sukhumvit Swimming" as the title track on July 29. On August 9 the music video trailer for "Sukhumvit Swimming" was revealed and the music video and full mini-album were released on August 10.

On February 17, 2020, a special gift film was released for one of the tracks from Spin Off titled "Message." Additionally, ONF previously released a performance video for "New World" and performed the song on Show! Music Core on June 27 for a special performance.

"New World" was the single they had performed on the final round of Mnet's survival show "Road To Kingdom," which in combination with their previous performances, helped them finish at 2nd place overall in the show, boosting their popularity and leading to the quadruplication of their fanbase.

== Promotion ==
ONF held a comeback showcase on August 10 via V LIVE where the group performed "New World," "Geppetto," "Sukhumvit Swimming," "Belle Epoque" and "We Must Love."

The group then proceeded to appear on M Countdown to promote "Sukhumvit Swimming" on August 13. They then continued to appear on The Show, Show! Music Core, Music Bank, Inkigayo and Show Champion to perform the song between August and October 2020.

== Track listing ==
Credits adapted from the liner notes of Spin Off.

No.	Title	Lyrics	Music	Arrangement	Length
1.	"스쿰빗스위밍 (Sukhumvit Swimming)"	Hwang Hyun (MonoTree); MK (ONF); WYATT (ONF)	Hwang Hyun (MonoTree); Yoon Jong Sung (MonoTree); MK (ONF)	Yoon Jong Sung (MonoTree); Hwang Hyun (MonoTree)	3:04
2.	"첫 키스의 법칙 (Belle Epoque)"	Hwang Hyun (MonoTree); Inner child (MonoTree); WYATT (ONF)	Hwang Hyun (MonoTree); NOPARI (MonoTree)	Hwang Hyun (MonoTree); NOPARI (MonoTree)	3:04
3.	"제페토 (Geppetto)"	Hwang Hyun (MonoTree); Inner child (MonoTree); MK (ONF)	GDLO (MonoTree); Hwang Hyun (MonoTree); Inner child (MonoTree); MK (ONF)	GDLO (MonoTree)	3:30
4.	"오늘 뭐 할래 (Good Good)"	Hwang Hyun (MonoTree); Inner child (MonoTree); MK (ONF); WYATT (ONF); Park Ji-yeon (MonoTree)	Hwang Hyun (MonoTree); G-High (MonoTree); MK (ONF); WYATT (ONF)	G-High (MonoTree); Hwang Hyun (MonoTree)	3:25
5.	"선인장 (Cactus)"	Hwang Hyun (MonoTree)	Hwang Hyun (MonoTree)	Hwang Hyun (MonoTree)	3:25
6.	"Message"	Hwang Hyun (MonoTree); MK (ONF); WYATT (ONF)	Hwang Hyun (MonoTree)	Hwang Hyun (MonoTree)	3:21
7.	"신세계 (New World - SPIN OFF Version)"	Hwang Hyun (MonoTree); WYATT (ONF)	Hwang Hyun (MonoTree); MK (ONF)	Hwang Hyun (MonoTree)	3:42
Total length:					23:32

== Accolades ==
Year-end lists
Critic/Publication	List	Work	Rank	Ref.
Dazed	The 40 Best K-pop Songs of 2020	"Sukhumvit Swimming"	38	

== Charts ==
=== Weekly chart ===
Chart (2020)	Peak position
South Korean Albums (Gaon Album Chart)	3

=== Monthly chart ===
Chart (2020)	Peak position
South Korean Albums (Gaon Album Chart)	10
