= ONF: My Name =

Studio album by ONF
- Released: February 24, 2021
- Recorded: 2021
- Genre: K-pop; dance
- Length: 34:04
- Label: WM Entertainment; Stone Music Entertainment
- Producer: Monotree

ONF chronology
Spin Off (2020)	ONF: My Name (2021)	Popping (2021)

Singles from ONF: My Name
- 1. "Beautiful Beautiful" Released: February 24, 2021

Repackaged album cover

Singles from City of ONF
- 1. "Ugly Dance" Released: April 28, 2021

ONF: My Name is the first studio album by South Korean–Japanese boy group ONF, released on February 24, 2021 by WM Entertainment and distributed by Stone Music Entertainment. The album contains eleven tracks, including the lead single "Beautiful Beautiful." During this promotional period ONF received their first music show win since their debut on SBS MTV's The Show.

The repackaged edition of the album, titled City of ONF was released on April 28, 2021, along with three new tracks, including lead single "Ugly Dance".

== Background and release ==
On February 9, 2021, WM Entertainment announced ONF's upcoming comeback to be on February 24 with the release of an opening trailer that revealed the name of the album to be ONF: My Name and the lead single as "Beautiful Beautiful". The track list for the album was published on February 17 which revealed the full album to contain eleven tracks total, and a pre-release music video for one of the album tracks, "My Name Is", was revealed on February 20. On February 24, the full album and the music video for "Beautiful Beautiful" were released.

"Lights On (2021 Ver.)" is a CD-only track. It shares the same name as "Lights On (Performance ver.)" - a performance video released August 11, 2017 shortly after the group's debut - and their 90-second preliminary performance "Lights On" performed during the survival show Road to Kingdom.

== Promotion ==
ONF held their comeback showcase on February 24 via V Live where the group performed their new songs "The Realist", "My Name Is", "Thermometer", "Secret Triangle", and "Beautiful Beautiful." They also performed two tracks from their previous albums: "ON/OFF" and "I Do." The group performed "Beautiful Beautiful" and "The Realist" on M Countdown for their first day of promotions.

The music video for "Beautiful Beautiful" gained 10 million views three days after its release, making this the shortest period of time for their music video to reach this milestone. ONF also received their first music show win since debut with "Beautiful Beautiful" on SBS MTV's The Show.

== Track listing ==
ONF: My Name track listing
No.	Title	Lyrics	Music	Arrangement	Length
1.	"Beautiful Beautiful"	황현 (MonoTree); WYATT (온앤오프)	황현 (MonoTree)	황현 (MonoTree)	3:11
2.	"My Name Is"	효진; E-TION; J-US; WYATT; MK; U (온앤오프)	황현; GDLO (Monotree)	GDLO (Monotree)	3:17
3.	"온도차 (Thermometer)"	이주형 (MonoTree)	이주형; NOPARI; 김해론(MonoTree)	NOPARI; 이주형 (MonoTree)	3:17
4.	"비밀 (Secret Triangle)"	황현 (MonoTree); WYATT (온앤오프)	황현; 윤종성(Monotree)	윤종성(Monotree)	3:02
5.	"The Realist"	GDLO (Monotree)	GDLO (Monotree)	GDLO (Monotree)	4:00
6.	"On-You (Interlude)"	황현; Inner Child (Monotree)	Inner Child; 황현 (Monotree); Hey Farmer (PRISMFILTER)	Hey Farmer (PRISMFILTER); 황현 (MonoTree)	2:53
7.	"누워서 세계 속으로 (Trip Advisor)"	황현; G-high; 추대관 (Monotree); WYATT (온앤오프); MK (온앤오프)	황현; G-high; 추대관 (Monotree)	황현; G-high; 추대관 (Monotree)	3:28
8.	"Feedback"	황현; 김해론(MonoTree); WYATT (온앤오프)	황현; NOPARI; 김해론(MonoTree)	NOPARI (Monotree)	3:05
9.	"I.T.I.L.U"	Onestar; 황현(Monotree)	황현; Onestar (Monotree)	황현 (MonoTree)	4:40
10.	"Beautiful Beautiful (English Ver.)"	l-belle; Moon Kim; pdly	황현 (MonoTree)	황현 (MonoTree)	3:11
11.	"Lights On (2021 Ver.)"	황현 (Monotree); WYATT (온앤오프); MK (온앤오프)	황현 (Monotree); MK (온앤오프); Ohway! (PRISMFILTER)	황현 (Monotree); Ohway! (PRISMFILTER)

City of ONF track listing
No.	Title	Lyrics	Music	Arrangement	Length
1.	"춤춰 (Ugly Dance)"	황현 (MonoTree)	황현 (MonoTree)	황현 (MonoTree)	3:18
2.	"My Genesis (Übermensch)"	황현 (MonoTree)	황현 (MonoTree)	황현 (MonoTree)	3:11
3.	"The Dreamer"	GDLO (Monotree); WYATT (온앤오프)	GDLO (Monotree)	GDLO (Monotree)	3:28
4.	"Beautiful Beautiful"	황현 (MonoTree); WYATT (온앤오프)	황현 (MonoTree)	황현 (MonoTree)	3:11
5.	"My Name Is"	효진; E-TION; J-US; WYATT; MK; U (온앤오프)	황현; GDLO (Monotree)	GDLO (Monotree)	3:17
6.	"온도차 (Thermometer)"	이주형 (MonoTree)	이주형; NOPARI; 김해론(MonoTree)	NOPARI; 이주형 (MonoTree)	3:17
7.	"비밀 (Secret Triangle)"	황현 (MonoTree); WYATT (온앤오프)	황현윤; 종성(Monotree)	황현윤 (Monotree)	3:02
8.	"The Realist"	GDLO (Monotree)	GDLO (Monotree)	GDLO (Monotree)	4:00
9.	"On-You (Interlude)"	황현; Inner Child (Monotree)	Inner Child; 황현 (Monotree); Hey Farmer (PRISMFILTER)	Hey Farmer (PRISMFILTER); 황현 (MonoTree)	2:53
10.	"누워서 세계 속으로 (Trip Advisor)"	황현; G-high; 추대관 (Monotree); WYATT (온앤오프); MK (온앤오프)	황현; G-high; 추대관 (Monotree)	황현; G-high; 추대관 (Monotree)	3:28
11.	"Feedback"	황현; 김해론(MonoTree); WYATT (온앤오프)	황현; NOPARI; 김해론(MonoTree)	NOPAI (Monotree)	3:05
12.	"I.T.I.L.U"	Onestar; 황현(Monotree)	황현; Onestar (Monotree)	황현 (Monotree)	4:40
13.	"Beautiful Beautiful (English Ver.)"	l-belle; Moon Kim; pdly	황현 (Monotree)	황현 (Monotree)	3:11
14.	"Lights On (2021 Ver.)"	황현 (Monotree); WYATT (온앤오프); MK (온앤오프)	황현 (Monotree); MK (온앤오프); Ohway! (PRISMFILTER)	황현 (Monotree); Ohway! (PRISMFILTER)
Total length:					44:03

== Accolades ==
Music program awards
Song	Program	Date	Ref.
"Beautiful Beautiful"	The Show (SBS MTV)	March 2, 2021	

== Charts ==
Chart performance for ONF: My Name
Chart (2021)	Peak position
Japanese Albums (Oricon)	34
South Korean Albums (Gaon)	3
