= Hush Rush =

- Digital cover

EP by Lee Chae-yeon
- Released: October 12, 2022
- Genre: K-pop
- Length: 11:44
- Language: Korean
- Label: WM; Genie; Stone Music

Lee Chae-yeon chronology
| Hush Rush (2022) | Over the Moon (2023) |

Singles from Hush Rush
- 1. "Hush Rush" Released: October 12, 2022

Professional ratings
Review scores
| Source | Rating |
|---|---|
| IZM | 4/5 stars |

Hush Rush is the debut extended play (EP) by South Korean singer Lee Chae-yeon. It was released by WM Entertainment on October 12, 2022, and contains four tracks, including the lead single of the same name.

== Background and release ==
On September 15, 2022, WM Entertainment announced that Lee Chae-yeon, former member of Iz*One, would make her solo debut in October. On September 29, it was revealed that Lee would release her first EP, Hush Rush, on October 12. The track listing was unveiled on October 5, with "Hush Rush" confirmed as the lead single. A track sampler teaser video was released on October 11, followed by the music video teaser for "Hush Rush" on October 12. The EP was released alongside the music video for "Hush Rush" on October 12.

== Composition ==
Hush Rush consists of four tracks. The lead single "Hush Rush" was described as an emotional dance-pop song, with lyrics portraying the freedom experienced on stage, likened to a vampire awakening and dancing under the moonlight. The second track, "Danny", features an 80s synth-pop vibe, with lyrics comparing fans' long-term relationships with idols to lifelong couples. The third track, "Aquamarine", is characterized by a groovy bassline and various instrumental elements. The final track, "Same But Different", is a dance song.

== Commercial performance ==
Hush Rush debuted at number ten on South Korea's Circle Album Chart for the week of October 9–15, 2022.

== Promotion ==
Prior to the release of Hush Rush, Lee held a live event to introduce the EP and its songs, as well as to communicate with her fans.

== Track listing ==
Track listing for Hush Rush
| No. | Title | Lyrics | Music | Arrangement | Length |
|---|---|---|---|---|---|
| 1. | "Hush Rush" | Jo Yoon-kyung | Dem Jointz; Ryan S. Jhun; Cristina Gallo | Dem Jointz; Ryan S. Jhun | 3:27 |
| 2. | "Danny" | Anne (Anne Story Company); Jeon Yu-li (Anne Story Company) | Ryan S. Jhun; Celine Svanbäck; Jeppe London Bilsby; Daniel Schulz; Daniel Salcedo Mirza | Ryan S. Jhun; Jeppe London Bilsby | 3:07 |
| 3. | "Aquamarine" | Anne (Anne Story Company) | Ryan S. Jhun; Gustav Nyström; Isabelle Z. | Ryan S. Jhun; Gustav Nyström | 3:09 |
| 4. | "Same But Different" | Seo Ji-eum | Ryan S. Jhun; Anton Rundberg; Julia Karlsson; Kristin Carpenter | Ryan S. Jhun; Anton Rundberg | 2:01 |
| Total length: | | | | | 11:44 |

== Charts ==
=== Weekly charts ===
Weekly chart performance for Hush Rush
| Chart (2022) | Peak position |
|---|---|
| South Korean Albums (Circle) | 10 |

=== Monthly charts ===
Monthly chart performance for Hush Rush
| Chart (2022) | Peak position |
|---|---|
| South Korean Albums (Circle) | 33 |

== Sales ==
Overall sales for Hush Rush
| Region | Sales |
|---|---|
| South Korea | 36,589 |

== Release history ==
Release history for Hush Rush
| Region | Date | Format | Label |
|---|---|---|---|
| South Korea | October 12, 2022 | CD | WM; Genie; Stone Music |
| Various | October 12, 2022 | Digital download; streaming | WM; Genie; Stone Music |
