= StrangeLab =

South Korean entertainment company

StrangeLab Inc.
- Native name: 스트레인지랩
- Formerly: WM Entertainment
- Type: Private (2008–2021); Subsidiary (since 2021)
- Industry: Entertainment
- Genre: K-pop
- Founded: July 21, 2008
- Founder: Lee Won-min (Kim Jung-soo)
- Headquarters: 8 World Cup buk-ro 15-gil, Mapo-gu, Seoul, South Korea
- Area served: Worldwide
- Key people: Lee Won-min, Kim Jin-mi
- Services: Artist management; Music production
- Parent: RBW (since 2021)
- Website: wment.co.kr

StrangeLab (formerly WM Entertainment (Hangul: WM 엔터테인먼트) is a South Korean entertainment company established in 2008 by former singer Lee Won-min (birth name: Kim Jung-soo). The company is responsible for managing artists Lu and XLOV. On April 7, 2021, the company was acquired by RBW. On March 11, 2026, they acquired 257 Entertainment.

== History ==
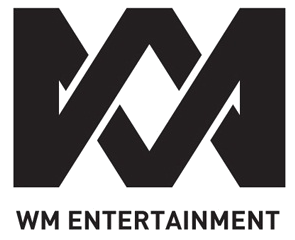
Logo of WM Entertainment (until 2018)

WM Entertainment was founded in 2008 by former South Korean singer Kim Jung-soo, who formally changed his name to Lee Won-min before establishing WM Entertainment.

The company was originally operated in a one-story building located in Bangbae-dong, Seocho District. In August 2014, Lee Won-min purchased a six-story building located in Mangwon-dong, Mapo District named Daemyung Tower Building for KR₩4.33 billion (approximately US$3.85 million), which functions as the current headquarters for WM Entertainment.

Almost a year after its foundation, WM Entertainment signed up Battle Shinhwa alumnus Taegoon. H-Eugene and Baby Vox Re.V member Ahn Jin-kyung joined the company in 2010.

WM Entertainment debuted their first boy group B1A4 on April 23, 2011.

WM Entertainment's first girl group Oh My Girl debuted on April 21, 2015.

WM Entertainment debuted soloist I (sister of B1A4 member Baro) on January 12, 2017.

WM's second boy group ONF debuted on August 2, 2017.

On April 7, 2021, it was announced that WM Entertainment had 70% of its shares bought by RBW, which houses idol groups such as Mamamoo, Oneus, and Onewe. WM became a subsidiary of RBW.

On March 24, 2025, it was confirmed that WM Entertainment would launch the girl group Uspeer by the first half of 2025. The group was the company's second girl group in ten years, after Oh My Girl. WM would later acquire 257 Entertainment, the entertainment company of XLOV, in March 2026. 257 Entertainment would later integrate with WM Entertainment and change their name to StrangeLab Inc. and Oh My Girl would switch to DSP Media in August 2026.

== Artists ==
=== Group ===
- XLOV

=== Soloist ===
- Lu

== Former artists ==
- Taegoon
- H2
  - H-Eugene
  - Han Soo-yeon
- An Jin-kyung
- Oh My Girl (2015-2026)
  - JinE (2015–2017)
  - Jiho (2015–2022)
  - YooA (2015–2025)
  - Arin (2015–2025)
  - Hyojung (2015-2026)
- B1A4 (2011–2025)
  - Jinyoung (2011–2018)
  - Baro (2011–2018)
  - CNU (2011–2025)
  - Sandeul (2011–2025)
  - Gongchan (2011–2025)
- I (2017–2018)
- ONF (2017–2026)
  - Laun (2017–2019)
  - Hyojin (2017–2026)
  - E-Tion (2017–2026)
  - Seungjun (2017–2026)
  - Wyatt (2017–2026)
  - Minkyun (2017–2026)
  - U (2017–2026)
- Lee Chae-yeon (2018–2025)
- Uspeer (2023–2025)

== Discography ==
=== 2009 ===
Released	Title	Artist	Type	Format	Language
January 15	1st Mini Album	Taegoon	Extended play	CD, download	Korean
April 21	"I Think I Love You"	H-Eugene	Extended play	CD, download	Korean
May 13	Rising Star	Taegoon	Extended play	CD, download	Korean
September 17	The 3rd Mini Album	Taegoon	Extended play	CD, download	Korean
November 11	"Love Warning (Feat. Joohee of 8Eight)"	H-Eugene	Download	CD, download	Korean

=== 2010 ===
Released	Title	Artist	Type	Format	Language
February 18	An Jin Kyoung 1st Mini Album	An Jin Kyoung	Extended play	CD, download	Korean
May 6	"Heart Attack"	H2	Single	Download	Korean
August 26	Be The Voice	An Jin Kyoung	Extended play	CD, download	Korean
December 24	"Love Alert II (Feat. Sohyang)"	H-Eugene	Single	Download	Korean

=== 2011 ===
Released	Title	Artist	Type	Format	Language
April 21	Let's Fly	B1A4	Extended play	CD, download	Korean
September 22	It B1A4	B1A4	Extended play	CD, download	Korean

=== 2012 ===
Released	Title	Artist	Type	Format	Language
January 25	Let's Fly / It B1A4	B1A4	Compilation album	CD + DVD, download	Korean
March 5	"This Time Is Over"	B1A4	Single	Download	Korean
March 14	The B1A4 I (Ignition)	B1A4	Studio album	CD, download	Korean
May 24	The B1A4 I (Ignition) Special Edition	B1A4	Studio album	CD, download	Korean
June 27	"Beautiful Target (Japanese ver.)"	B1A4	Single	CD + DVD, download	Japanese
August 29	"Oyasumi Good Night"	B1A4	Single	CD + DVD, download	Japanese
October 24	1	B1A4	Studio album	CD + DVD, download	Japanese
October 26	B1A4 Super Hits - Asian Edition	B1A4	Greatest hits album	CD	Korean
November 12	In the Wind	B1A4	Extended play	CD, download	Korean

=== 2013 ===
Released	Title	Artist	Type	Format	Language
May 8	What's Happening?	B1A4	Extended play	CD, download	Korean
June 21	B1A4 Super Hits 2 - Asian Edition	B1A4	Greatest hits album	CD	Korean
August 28	"Ige Museun Iriya ~Nande? Doshite?"	B1A4	Single	CD + DVD, download	Japanese

=== 2014 ===
Released	Title	Artist	Type	Format	Language
January 13	Who Am I	B1A4	Studio album	CD + DVD, download	Korean
March 19	2	B1A4	Studio album	CD + DVD, download	Japanese
July 14	Solo Day	B1A4	Extended play	CD + DVD, download	Korean
September 10	"Solo Day (Japanese ver.)"	B1A4	Single	CD + DVD, download	Japanese

=== 2015 ===
Released	Title	Artist	Type	Format	Language
January 21	"Shiroi Kiseki"	B1A4	Single	CD + DVD, download	Japanese
March 11	Miracle Radio -2.5kHz- vol.1	B1A4	Concept / Compilation album	CD	Japanese
March 11	Miracle Radio -2.5kHz- vol.2	B1A4	Concept / Compilation album	CD	Japanese
March 11	Miracle Radio -2.5kHz- vol.3	B1A4	Concept / Compilation album	CD	Japanese
March 11	Miracle Radio -2.5kHz- vol.4	B1A4	Concept / Compilation album	CD	Japanese
March 11	Miracle Radio -2.5kHz- vol.5	B1A4	Concept / Compilation album	CD	Japanese
April 20	Oh My Girl	Oh My Girl	Extended play	CD, download	Korean
August 10	Sweet Girl	B1A4	Extended play	CD, download	Korean
October 8	Closer	Oh My Girl	Extended play	CD, download	Korean
November 18	"Happy Days"	B1A4	Single	CD + DVD, download	Japanese
December 10	"It's Christmas"	B1A4	Single	Download	Korean

=== 2016 ===
Released	Title	Artist	Type	Format	Language
March 16	3	B1A4	Studio album	CD + DVD, download	Japanese
March 21	"One Step Two Step"	Oh My Girl	Single	Download	Korean
March 28	Pink Ocean	Oh My Girl	Extended play	CD, download	Korean, Chinese
May 26	Windy Day (Pink Ocean repackage)	Oh My Girl	Extended play	CD, download	Korean, Chinese
August 1	Listen to My Word	Oh My Girl	Single album	CD, download	Korean
October 4	Stay as You Are	Sandeul	Extended play	CD, download	Korean
November 28	Good Timing	B1A4	Studio album	CD, download	Korean

=== 2017 ===
Released	Title	Artist	Type	Format	Language
January 12	I Dream	I	Extended play	CD, download	Korean
March 8	"You and I"	B1A4	Single	CD + DVD, download	Japanese
March 8	B1A4 Fanhits Korea	B1A4	Greatest hits album	CD	Korean
April 3	Coloring Book	Oh My Girl	Extended play	CD, download	Korean
May 24	"Follow Me"	B1A4	Single	CD + DVD, download	Japanese
June 14	4	B1A4	Studio album	CD + DVD, download	Japanese
August 2	On/Off	ONF	Extended play	CD, download	Korean
September 25	Rollin'	B1A4	Extended play	CD, download	Korean

=== 2018 ===
Released	Title	Artist	Type	Format	Language
January 9	Secret Garden	Oh My Girl	Extended play	CD, download	Korean
February 7	"Do You Remember"	B1A4	Single	CD + DVD, download	Japanese
February 21	B1A4 Station Box	B1A4	Box set	CD + Blu-ray	Japanese
February 21	B1A4 Station Square	B1A4	Greatest hits album	CD, download	Japanese
February 21	B1A4 Station Triangle	B1A4	Greatest hits album	CD, download	Japanese
February 21	B1A4 Station Circle	B1A4	Greatest hits album	CD, download	Japanese
February 21	B1A4 Station Kiss	B1A4	Greatest hits album	CD, download	Japanese
April 2	Banana Allergy Monkey	Oh My Girl Banhana	Concept / Extended play	CD, download	Korean
April 10	"Aerumade"	B1A4	Single	CD + DVD, download	Japanese
June 7	You Complete Me	ONF	Extended play	CD, download	Korean
June 27	5	B1A4	Studio album	CD + DVD, download	Japanese
August 1	"On/Off (Japanese ver.)"	ONF	Single	CD + DVD, download	Japanese
August 29	Banana ga Taberenai Saru	Oh My Girl Banhana	Concept / Extended play	CD + DVD, download	Japanese, Korean
September 10	Remember Me	Oh My Girl	Extended play	CD, download	Korean
September 26	B1A4 Japan Best Album 2012-2018	B1A4	Greatest hits album	CD + Blu-ray	Japanese
September 26	"Complete (Japanese ver.)"	ONF	Single	CD + DVD, download	Japanese
November 9	"SNS"	G-Park X Hyojung	Single	Download	Korean
December 10	"Hello! WM"	B1A4, Oh My Girl, ONF	Single	Download	Korean

=== 2019 ===
Released	Title	Artist	Type	Format	Language
January 9	Oh My Girl Japan Debut Album	Oh My Girl	Studio album	CD + DVD, download	Japanese, Korean
January 26	"A Day of Love"	B1A4	Single	Download	Korean
February 7	We Must Love	ONF	Extended play	CD, download	Korean
April 8	"Love Speed"	Oh My Girl X UL	Single	Download	Korean
April 10	"Bana no Hi"	B1A4	Single	Download, DVD + CD	Japanese
May 8	The Fifth Season	Oh My Girl	Studio album	CD, download	Korean
June 3	One Fine Day	Sandeul	Extended play	CD, download	Korean
July 3	Oh My Girl Japan 2nd Album	Oh My Girl	Studio album	CD + DVD, download	Japanese, Korean
August 5	Fall in Love (The Fifth Season repackage)	Oh My Girl	Studio album	CD, download	Korean
October 7	Go Live	ONF	Extended play	CD, download	Korean
October 25	"Guerilla"	Oh My Girl	Single	Download	Korean
October 30	"Bungee (Japanese ver.)"	Oh My Girl	Single	Download	Japanese

=== 2020 ===
Released	Title	Artist	Type	Format	Language
January 8	Eternally	Oh My Girl	Studio album	CD + DVD, download	Japanese, Korean
April 27	Nonstop	Oh My Girl	Extended play	CD, download	Korean
May 27	"Lazy Me"	Sandeul	Single	Download	Korean
June 12	"New World"	ONF	Single	Download	Korean
June 16	"Sometoon 2020 OST"	Binnie	Single	Download	Korean
June 29	"Nonstop (Japanese ver.)"	Oh My Girl	Single	Download	Japanese
July 2	"Smile Box"	Sandeul	Single	Download	Korean
July 27	"Lemonade"	Oh My Girl	Single	Download	Japanese
August 5	My Little Thought EP.1	Sandeul	Extended play	CD, download	Korean
August 10	Spin Off	ONF	Extended play	CD, download	Korean
August 16	Po My Girl	Oh My Girl	Single	Download	Korean
August 24	"Tear Rain"	Oh My Girl	Single	Download	Japanese
August 28	"Rocket Ride"	Oh My Girl X Keanu Silva (feat. Mougleta)	Single	Download	Korean
September 4	Ours	B1A4, Oh My Girl, ONF	Single	Download	Korean
September 7	Bon Voyage	YooA	Extended play	CD, download	Korean
October 8	"Etoile"	Oh My Girl	Single	Download	Japanese
October 15	"Etoile (Korean ver.)"	Oh My Girl	Single	Download	Japanese
October 19	Origine	B1A4	Studio album	CD, download	Korean
November 25	"Etoile / Nonstop (Japanese ver.)"	Oh My Girl	Single	CD, download	Japanese

=== 2021 ===
Released	Title	Artist	Type	Format	Language
February 24	ONF: My Name	ONF	Studio album	CD, download	Korean
April 23	"10 Times"	B1A4	Single	Download	Korean
April 28	City of ONF (ONF: My Name repackage)	ONF	Studio album	CD, download	Korean
May 10	Dear OhMyGirl	Oh My Girl	Extended play	CD, download	Korean
August 9	Popping	ONF	Extended play	CD, download	Korean
September 22	"Dun Dun Dance (Japanese ver.)"	Oh My Girl	Single	CD, download	Japanese
November 10	"Adore You"	B1A4	Single	Download	Korean
December 3	Goosebumps	ONF	Extended play	CD, download	Korean
December 23	"Shark"	Oh My Girl	Single	Download	Korean

=== 2022 ===
Released	Title	Artist	Type	Format	Language
March 28	Real Love	Oh My Girl	Studio album	CD, download	Korean
March 30	Oh My Girl Best	Oh My Girl	Compilation album	CD, download	Japanese
October 12	Hush Rush	Lee Chae-yeon	Extended play	CD, download	Korean

== Partnerships ==
=== Music labels ===
Active

- (Japan) Victor Entertainment (ONF)
- Ariola Japan (Oh My Girl)

Former partners

- Warner Music Taiwan (B1A4) (2012–2015)
- (Japan) Pony Canyon (B1A4) (2012–2018)
- (Japan) Universal J (B1A4) (2016–2025)

=== Distributors ===
Active

- (South Korea) Sony Music Entertainment Korea
- (South Korea) CJ ENM/Stone Music Entertainment, Genie Music (2017–2021, 2022–present)
- (South Korea) Copan Global (merchandise)
- Universal Music Japan
- (Japan) JVC Kenwood Victor Entertainment
- (Japan) Sony Music Solutions

Former partners

- (South Korea) Pony Canyon Korea (2009–2014)
- Warner Music Taiwan (2012–2015)
- (Japan) Pony Canyon (2012–2018)
- (South Korea) Kakao M (2014–2020)
