= You Complete Me (EP) =

EP by ONF
- Released: June 7, 2018
- Recorded: 2018
- Genre: Dance; ballad
- Length: 20:16
- Language: Korean
- Label: WM Entertainment; Stone Music Entertainment
- Producer: MonoTree

ONF chronology
ON/OFF (2017)	You Complete Me (2018)	We Must Love (2019)

Singles from You Complete Me
- 1. "Complete (널 만난 순간)" Released: June 7, 2018

Music video
- "Complete" on YouTube

You Complete Me is the second EP by South Korean boy group ONF. It was released on June 7, 2018, by WM Entertainment and distributed by Stone Music Entertainment. The EP consisted of six tracks with the title track "Complete".

== Background and release ==
On May 15, 2018, WM Entertainment announced that ONF will make their comeback on June 7, 2018 with the group's 2nd mini album "You Complete Me". On May 27, 2018, The group's comeback schedule teaser image was released. On May 30, 2018, The album's track list of the group's 2nd mini album was revealed. On May 31, 2018, WM Entertainment released the lyrics teaser image of their lead single,"Complete". On June 1, 2018, WM Entertainment released the unofficial member's individual teaser image together with their highlight medley for the album. On June 3, 2018, WM Entertainment released the second set of member's individual teaser image.

== Promotion ==
On June 7, 2018, ONF performed their new second album, "You Complete Me" on the showcase event that was held at Hoe Hung-dong New World, Central District, Seoul. All the seven members of the group attended the conference.The title track "Complete" is a dance song featuring a feeling of conflicting feelings, sometimes even though it sounds like a screaming boy's voice.

The group made their comeback, performing their lead single,"Complete" and "Fly Me to The Moon" on June 7 on Mnet's M Countdown.

== Track listing ==
No.	Title	Lyrics	Music	Arrangement	Length
1.	"Complete (널 만난 순간)"	황현 (MonoTree)	황현 (MonoTree)	황현 (MonoTree)	3:06
2.	"Fly Me To The Moon"	황현 (MonoTree)	황현; Lee Joo Hyung (MonoTree)	황현 (MonoTree)	3:11
3.	"아침(Good Morning)"	손고은(MonoTree)	손고은; NOPARI (MonoTree)	손고은; NOPARI (MonoTree)	3:53
4.	"Fifty Fifty"	황현 (MonoTree)	황현; NOPARI; 손고은 (MonoTree)	NOPARI (MonoTree)	3:14
5.	"나 말고 다 (Incomplete)"	황현 (MonoTree); WYATT (온앤오프)	Simon Petren; Lee Joo Hyung; 손고은 (MonoTree)		3:27
6.	"스물 네 번 (86400)"	Onestar; 추대관 (MonoTree)	추대관; Onestar (MonoTree)	추대관 (MonoTree)	4:05
Total length:					20:16

== Charts ==
=== Weekly charts ===
Chart (2018)	Peak position
South Korean Albums (Gaon)	8

=== Monthly charts ===
Chart (2017)	Peak position
South Korean Albums (Gaon)	17

== Release history ==
Country	Date	Distributing label	Format
South Korea	June 7, 2018	Stone Music Entertainment; WM Entertainment	CD, digital download
Various	June 7, 2018	Stone Music Entertainment; WM Entertainment	CD, digital download
