= Go Live (EP) =

EP by ONF
- Released: October 7, 2019
- Recorded: 2019
- Studio: MonoTree
- Genre: K-pop; Dance
- Length: 16:39
- Language: Korean
- Label: WM Entertainment; Stone Music Entertainment
- Producer: MonoTree; MK; Justin Reinstein; ORORI

ONF chronology
| We Must Love (2019) | Go Live (2019) | Spin Off (2020) |

Singles from Go Live
- 1. "Why" Released: October 7, 2019

Music video
- "Why" on YouTube

Go Live (stylized as GO LIVE) is the fourth extended play by South Korean–Japanese boy group ONF, released on October 7, 2019 by WM Entertainment and distributed by Stone Music Entertainment. The extended play contains five tracks in pop and dance-pop genres, and was largely produced by their long-time collaborator and production team MonoTree with additional composition from Justin Reinstein and ORORI. In addition, member Wyatt and MK also contributed both lyrics and composition to the lead single "Why". Upon its release, the extended play became the group's fourth consecutive top-ten entry on the Gaon Album Chart, and their first to chart outside South Korea as the EP made its debut at number thirty-eight on the Oricon Albums Chart. It was the group's first release as a sextet since the departure of former member Laun on August 23, 2019, shortly after the first teaser for the group's release.

To further promote the extended play, the group revealed a music video for the lead single "Why" on the same digital release day and appeared on several South Korean television music programs to perform the song. Similar to their previous releases, "Why" remained largely uncharted in their native country.

== Background and release ==
On August 23, 2019, WM Entertainment released the first teaser video for ONF's upcoming mini-album, featuring ONF member J-Us and filmed in Berlin, Germany. Shortly after, the label issued a statement announcing that member Laun terminated his contract with the agency for personal reasons, thus leaving the group during their comeback preparation. Following teaser videos featuring the remaining members were released over the next weeks, with the release's title to be Go Live and "Why" as the lead single on September 23. The extended play was scheduled to be released on October 7, with the tracklisting being revealed later on September 25. The label then released Go Live both digitally and physically on October 7, along with the music video for "Why".

== Promotion ==
Similar to their previous release, ONF held a comeback showcase at the Yes 24 Live Hall in Gwangjin District, Seoul, where the group performed live "Why", "Asteroid" and "Twinkle Twinkle" for the first time. The group then proceeded to appear on M Countdown to promote the song on October 10, along with another album track "Moscow Moscow". They then continued to appear on The Show, Show! Music Core, Music Bank, Inkigayo and Show Champion to perform "Why" between October and November 2019. ONF then revealed a special performance video for "Why" and a self-made video for "All Day" on October 21, followed by a lyric video for "Moscow Moscow" on November 4. The group then had another performance for "Moscow Moscow" on January 4, 2020 at Show! Music Core. Both the aforementioned track and "Why" were later sampled for the group's participation in Road to Kingdom, the male counterpart reality television program of Queendom that features seven rising boy groups competing with live performances of their previous singles and new recording.

== Track listing ==
| No. | Title | Lyrics | Music | Arrangement | Length |
|---|---|---|---|---|---|
| 1. | "Why" | 황현 (MonoTree); WYATT (온앤오프) | 황현 (MonoTree); MK (온앤오프) | 황현 (MonoTree) | 3:20 |
| 2. | "소행성 (Asteroid)" | GDLO (MonoTree) | GDLO; 황현 (MonoTree); MK (온앤오프) | GDLO (MonoTree) | 3:21 |
| 3. | "억x억 (All Day)" | 황현 (MonoTree); WYATT (온앤오프) | NOPARI; 황현 (MonoTree); Justin Reinstein; 오로리 | NOPARI; 황현 (MonoTree); 오로리 | 3:15 |
| 4. | "Moscow Moscow" | 황현; GDLO (MonoTree) | 황현 (MonoTree) | 황현 (MonoTree) | 3:25 |
| 5. | "Twinkle Twinkle" | Inner Child (MonoTree) | Inner Child; GDLO (MonoTree) | GDLO (MonoTree) | 3:18 |
| Total length: | | | | | 16:39 |

== Charts ==
=== Weekly chart ===
| Chart (2019) | Peak position |
|---|---|
| South Korean Albums (Gaon Album Chart) | 8 |
| Japanese Albums (Oricon Albums Chart) | 38 |

=== Monthly chart ===
| Chart (2019) | Peak position |
|---|---|
| South Korean Albums (Gaon Album Chart) | 24 |

== Release history ==
| Country | Date | Label | Format |
|---|---|---|---|
| South Korea | October 7, 2019 | Stone Music Entertainment; WM Entertainment | CD, digital download |
| Various | October 7, 2019 | Stone Music Entertainment; WM Entertainment | CD, digital download |
