= ONF (band) =

South Korean boy band

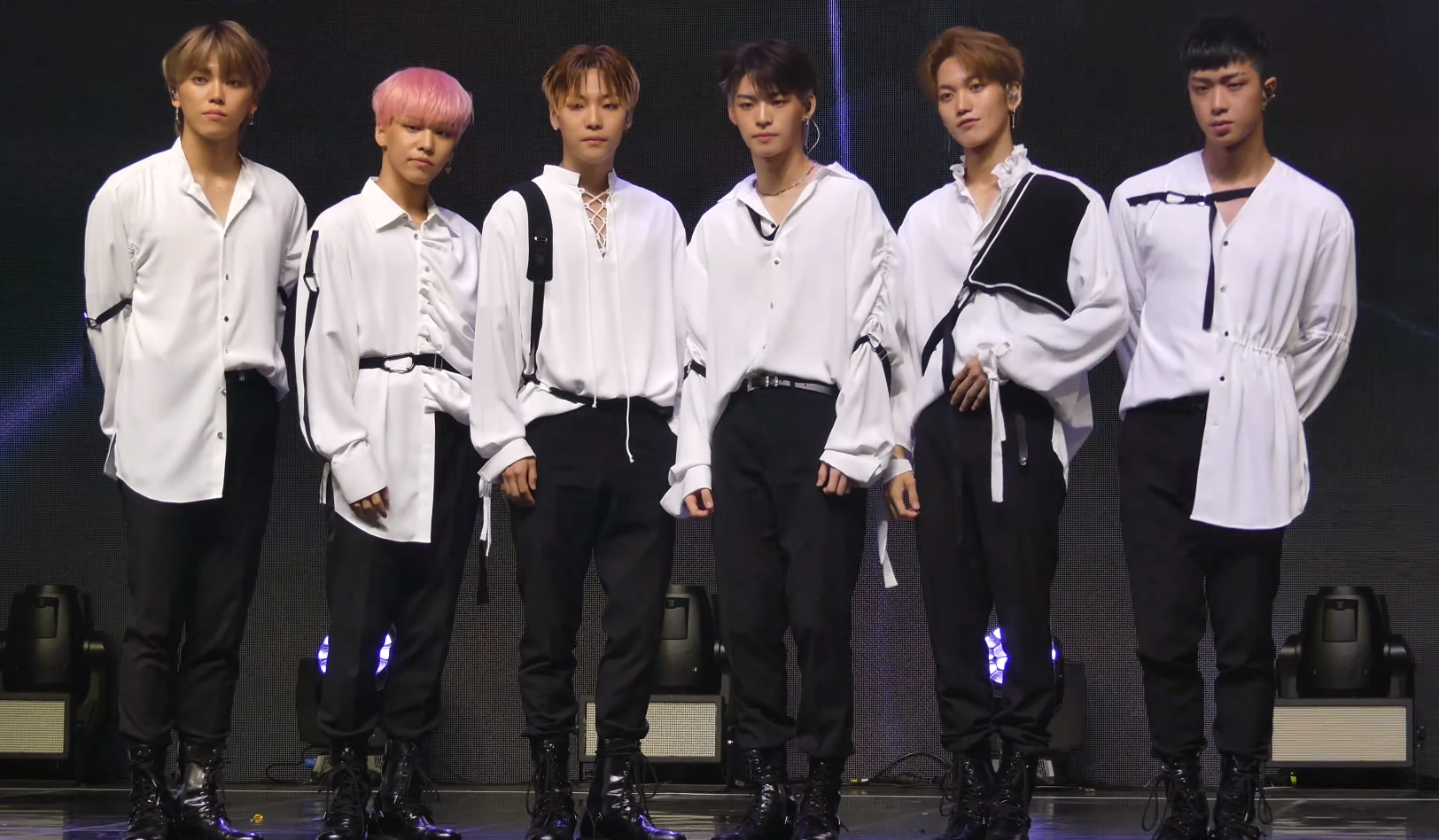
- ONF in October 2019; From L-R: Minkyun, U, E-Tion, Hyojin, Seungjun, and Wyatt

Background information
- Origin: Seoul, South Korea
- Genres: K-pop; dance
- Years active: 2017–present
- Labels: WM; Victor; KI
- Members: Hyojin; E-Tion; Seungjun (Note: formerly known as J-Us); Wyatt; Minkyun (Note: formerly known as MK); Yuto (Note: formerly known as U)
- Past members: Laun
- Website: on7off.com

ONF (Korean: 온앤오프; RR: Onaenopeu; pronounced as On and Off) is a South Korean-Japanese boy band formed by WM Entertainment. Originally debuting as a seven-piece group on August 3, 2017, with their EP, the group currently consists of six members: Hyojin, E-Tion, Seungjun, Wyatt, Minkyun, and Yuto. The group's youngest member, Laun, left the group on August 23, 2019, for personal circumstances shortly before the group's fourth extended play Go Live.

== History ==
=== Formation and pre-debut activities ===
Prior to joining WM Entertainment, U was a trainee at JYP Entertainment, while Minkyun was a trainee at Starship Entertainment. In 2015, Minkyun participated in Mnet and Starship Entertainment's survival program No.Mercy but was eliminated during episode 7. During the group's first showcase, Laun revealed that he was a trainee at Big Hit Entertainment and used to train together with boy group BTS. All seven members were eventually introduced as WM Boys, and had their first appearance as B1A4's backup dancers at the 2016 Dream Concert in Seoul. In addition, members Seungjun, Laun and Wyatt made a cameo appearance in labelmate B1A4's mini drama VCR "The Class", while E-Tion and Wyatt appeared in another B1A4 VCR called "Feeling". Hyojin, E-Tion, Seungjun and Wyatt were featured as dancers in the Korean version of the web drama Loss:Time:Life. On May 25, 2017, all of the members of WM Boys attended IDOLCON (아이돌콘) and performed "Original", a B-side track from their upcoming debut extended play.

=== 2017–2018: Introduction, debut and Japanese debut ===
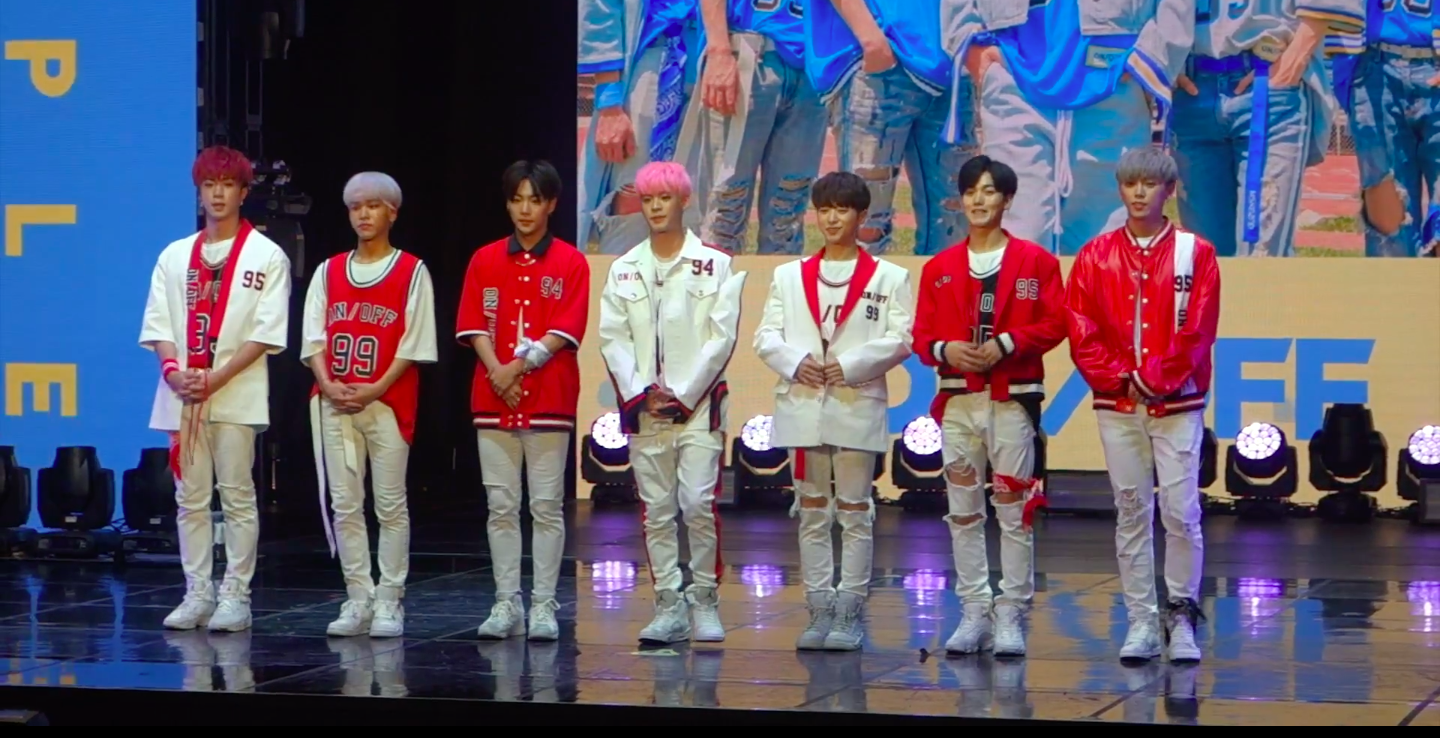
ONF in June 2018

Following WM Entertainment's confirmation to introduce the group, ONF released their debut EP and its lead single "ON/OFF" on August 2, 2017, while having their debut stage at M Countdown the following day. The members are composed of two teams, the ON team and the OFF team. Hyojin is the leader of the ON team, which includes E-Tion and Minkyun. Seungjun leads the OFF team, which includes Wyatt and U. Laun is part of both teams. The boy group is WM Entertainment's first idol group in two years and three months following the introduction of fellow labelmate Oh My Girl in April 2015, and subsequently the second boy group from the label after B1A4. Shortly after the group's debut, all seven members joined the survival show Mix Nine in November 2017, with member Hyojin revealed as the male center for Mix Nine's first performance "Just Dance" earlier on October 28. He eventually became part of the top nine members to debut during the show's on January 26, 2018, placing second while former member Laun placed seventh. The top nine boys of Mix Nine were set to debut later that year, but due to the inability of the individual companies to form an agreement, the project was canceled. ONF then released their second extended play You Complete Me and its lead single "Complete" on June 7, 2018. A week later, the group signed a contract with Japanese label Victor Entertainment to make their official debut in Japan later in August. They officially debuted in Japan on August 1 with a re-recorded Japanese version of their debut eponymous single, preceded by a music video on July 3. They also held their Japanese debut showcase at the Tokyo's Minavi BLITZ Asaka on July 31. On September 7, ONF released the music video for their second Japanese single "Complete (Japanese Ver.)". Their full CD, including two Japanese B-sides, was released on September 26.

=== 2019: Subsequent releases and Laun's departure ===
ONF released their third extended play We Must Love, on February 7, consisting of five tracks and its eponymous lead single. They announced a 2019 Asia Tour of the same name, heading to Hong Kong, Singapore, and Taipei in the spring; however, their Singapore stop was canceled. On June 27, WM Entertainment announced that Laun was cast as Yeon Joo-hyuk in the tVN D STORY web drama Chubby Romance 2 (통통한 연애2), marking his first professional acting role. ONF performed the main theme for the series "So Pretty" (예뻐죽겠다), released on July 14.

On August 23, WM released a statement that Laun departed from the group and terminated his contract due to personal circumstances. Following his departure, ONF released their fourth EP, Go Live on October 7. The EP contains five tracks, including the lead single "Why".

=== 2020: Road to Kingdom and Spin Off ===
On March 20, it was announced that ONF would join Mnet's reality television competition Road to Kingdom. Their final track from Road to Kingdom, "New World (신새계)", was released on June 12, 2020. It became their first track to appear on the Gaon Digital Chart and Billboard's K-pop Hot 100, peaking at 112 and 97 respectively. The group eventually finished in second place overall in the program. ONF released Spin Off, their fifth EP and first since appearing on Road to Kingdom, on August 10. The EP contains seven tracks, including the lead single "Sukhumvit Swimming". They went on to star in their first web drama "Can I Step In?", the first episode of which premiered on YouTube on December 23.

=== 2021–2022: Other activities, new albums and members' enlistment ===
On February 24, ONF released their first studio album ONF: My Name, consisting of eleven tracks, including its lead single "Beautiful Beautiful". A pre-release single, "My Name Is", was released on February 20. On March 2, the group earned their first music show win of their career with "Beautiful Beautiful" on SBS MTV's The Show. "Beautiful Beautiful" was ONF's first top-10 single, peaking at 7 on the Gaon Digital Chart and topping the Gaon Download Chart. ONF returned with the repackaged version of their first studio album, City of ONF, on April 28, consisting of three additional tracks, including the lead single "Ugly Dance". Like "Beautiful Beautiful", "Ugly Dance" debuted at 1 on the Gaon Download Chart and peaked at 42 on the Gaon Digital Chart.

For ONF's fourth debut anniversary, they released a music video for their song "Trip Advisor" using video submissions from fans all over the world.

On August 9, ONF released the summer popup album Popping, consisting of five tracks, including the title track of the same name.

On November 2, it was announced that all members, except U, will enlist in mandatory military service together in December. Before their enlistments, ONF released their sixth EP Goosebumps on December 3, consisting of five tracks, including the title track of the same name. On December 21, Minkyun was the first member to enlist as an active duty soldier, followed by Seungjun and Wyatt who enlisted on December 27 and Hyojin and E-Tion, who enlisted on December 28 as active duty soldiers.

On May 24, U appeared on street dance survival show Be Mbitious. He appears as a contestant, to compete for a place in a project dance crew that will appear on Mnet's Street Man Fighter, but failed to make it into the main show.

On August 16, to celebrate their debut anniversary, ONF released special album Storage of ONF, the preparation for the album, including music video was finished prior to the Korean members' enlistment. The special album consisting of ten tracks, including five remastered versions, with "Your Song" as the title track.

From October 8 to October 22, 2022, five Korean members serving in the military gathered at the Gyeryong World Military Culture Expo to hold various stages, including Korean Force special show "Consolation train" and busking performances. Among them, the first group stage, Beautiful Beautiful performance fancam video, and the Hype Boy dance cover video of E-Tion and Seungjun, drew a lot of attention. Hype Boy's individual fan cam videos on social networks gained over 2 million views in just few days, and were listed on Weibo's real-time search keyword and videos were introduced on overseas broadcasts.

=== 2023: Hyojin's solo, end of military service and resumption of group activities ===
On February 14, Hyojin released special single "Love Things". As with Storage of ONF, the single was recorded before Hyojin's military enlistment and released while Hyojin was still on active duty.

In June 2023, all members were discharged from the military, with Minkyun on June 20, Seungjun and Wyatt on June 26, and E-Tion and Hyojin on June 27. After that on June 28, ONF hosted a live broadcast through Weverse to meet with the fans for the first time after their discharge.

On June 30, WM Entertainment announced that ONF would hold a fan meeting "Be Here Now" at Kwangwoon University's Donghae Culture and Arts Center on July 29.

On July 1, it was announced that ONF would participate in RBW's first family concert "RBW 2023 SUMMER FESTIVAL Over the Rainbow" held at SK Olympic Handball Gymnasium on July 16.

In September, it was announced that ONF would make a comeback on October 4, with their seventh EP Love Effect, about 1 year and 10 months after the last one and 4 months after being discharged from the military.

=== 2024: Stage name changes, Beautiful Shadow and Infuse ===
On January 1, WM Entertainment announced that the members formerly known by the stage names J-Us and MK will henceforth promote using their legal names Seungjun and Minkyun respectively.

From February 28 to March 3, ONF held their first Canada Tour "Be Here Now in Canada" in three cities: Vancouver, Toronto and Montreal.

On February 21, WM Entertainment announced that ONF would be holding a solo concert "Spotlight" in Seoul, South Korea on April 6 and 7, followed by a Japanese tour in four cities: Osaka, Fukuoka, Nagoya, and Tokyo from April 29 to May 3.

On March 12, ONF announced they would be releasing their eighth EP Beautiful Shadow on April 8.

On July 17, ONF announced they would be releasing their first instrumental album Infuse on August 2, as a gift to commemorate their seventh anniversary.

=== 2025–present: Subsequent releases, departure from WM, and new agency ===
In January 2025, ONF held the 1st Chapter of their Pinky Ring Fanmeeting in Konkuk University Millenium Hall.

ONF released Part 1 of their second studio album ONF: My Identity of February 18, which broke their personal record of 1st week album sales. Its title track “The Stranger” also won 1st place at two music shows, marking the group’s first music show win on a public broadcast.

ONF held their first live band concert in Jangchung Arena on 31 May and 1 June, entitled "The Map: Stranger's Path". During the concert, they performed 'Mirage', an unreleased, upcoming album B-side.

On 21 June, ONF held their first joint concert with WM Entertainment seniors B1A4, 'Fly with Light' in Taipei. ONF then stayed on for several days of promotional activities in various parts of Taiwan.

On the group's 8th anniversary on 3 August, ONF released digital single "Summer Light", with lyrics written by the members.

On 27 September 2025, ONF held their Pinky Ring 2nd Chapter Fan Meeting in Kwangwoon University Donghae Arts Center. Upon its conclusion, WM Entertainment announced Tokyo and Osaka legs of "The Map: Stranger's Path" concert, to be held in November.

On November 10, ONF released their ninth mini-album 'Unbroken', with title track ‘Put It Back’. Amid anticipation for Part 2 of 'My Identity', the roll-out for the album was met with constant confusion and surprise, especially after the track list revealed the first-ever absence of producers Monotree and ONF member composition and lyric credits, with the new tracks made instead by mainly RBW Entertainment producers.

Monotree co-founder Hwang Hyun, who has led the production of ONF's discography since their pre-debut days, later took to social media to respond to media and fan queries, expressing his continued love and commitment to the group, noting that he will be able to share more about the issue in the future. The album was also mostly unpromoted, with the members focusing on the Japanese concerts for the month.

On 10 and 11 January 2026, ONF held another live band concert "The Map: Beyond The Horizon", the group's first in the iconic Seoul Olympic Hall, where the members hinted at important decisions to be made, global promotions, and asked for fans’ patience for good news.

Later that month, WM Entertainment announced that ONF decided to part ways with the label, but that group activities would still continue. On March 6, ONF signed with KI (Note: KI stands for Kulture Insights.) Entertainment and member U changed his stage name to Yuto.

KI Entertainment announced that ONF will hold their first fanmeeting since moving companies. There will be two shows on 25 April 2026 at MHLiveHall.

== Members ==
=== Current ===
- Hyojin (효진)
- E-Tion (이션)
- Seungjun (승준; formerly known as J-Us (제이어스))
- Wyatt (와이엇)
- Minkyun (민균; formerly known as MK (엠케이))
- Yuto (유토; formerly known as U (유))

=== Former ===
- Laun (라운)

== Discography ==
=== Studio albums ===
Title	Album details	Peak chart positions		Sales
Title	Album details	KOR	JPN	Sales
ONF: My Name	Released: February 24, 2021; Label: WM Entertainment; Formats: CD, digital download	3	34	KOR: 75,283; JPN: 1,262
Storage of ONF	Released: August 16, 2022; Label: WM Entertainment, Sony Music; Formats: CD, digital download	7	—	KOR: 36,800

=== Compilation albums ===
Title	Album details	Peak chart positions	Sales
Title	Album details	KOR	Sales
Infuse	Released: August 2, 2024; Label: WM Entertainment; Formats: LP, CD, digital download	30	KOR: 15,417

=== Reissues ===
Title	Album details	Peak chart positions	Sales
Title	Album details	KOR	Sales
City of ONF	Released: April 28, 2021; Label: WM Entertainment; Formats: CD, digital download	4	KOR: 86,702

=== Extended plays ===
Title	EP details	Peak chart positions		Sales
Title	EP details	KOR	JPN	Sales
On/Off	Released: August 2, 2017; Label: WM Entertainment; Formats: CD, digital download	9	—	KOR: 14,804
You Complete Me	Released: June 7, 2018; Label: WM Entertainment; Formats: CD, digital download	8	—	KOR: 24,937
We Must Love	Released: February 7, 2019; Label: WM Entertainment; Formats: CD, digital download	5	—	KOR: 19,950
Go Live	Released: October 7, 2019; Label: WM Entertainment; Formats: CD, digital download	8	38	KOR: 21,636; JPN: 1,566
Spin Off	Released: August 10, 2020; Label: WM Entertainment; Formats: CD, digital download	3	38	KOR: 82,486; JPN: 1,113
Popping	Released: August 9, 2021; Label: WM Entertainment; Formats: CD, digital download	2	35	KOR: 111,696; JPN: 1,347
Goosebumps	Released: December 3, 2021; Label: WM Entertainment; Formats: CD, digital download	2	—	KOR: 109,805
Love Effect	Released: October 4, 2023; Label: WM Entertainment; Formats: CD, digital download	6	—	KOR: 133,892
Beautiful Shadow	Released: April 8, 2024; Label: WM Entertainment; Formats: CD, digital download	7	43	KOR: 98,917; JPN: 904
ONF: My Identity	Released: February 18, 2025; Label: WM Entertainment; Formats: CD, digital download	1	—	KOR: 119,613
Unbroken	Released: November 10, 2025; Label: WM Entertainment; Formats: CD, digital download	10	—	KOR: 35,735
ONF: My Self	Released: June 17, 2026; Label: KI Entertainment; Formats: CD, digital download	4	17	KOR: 115,944; JPN: 1,882
"—" denotes releases that did not chart or were not released in that region.

=== Singles ===
List of singles, with selected chart positions and sales
Title	Year	Peak chart positions			Sales (Note: Korean-language singles are digital downloads while Japanese-language singles are physical units, except noted.)	Album
Title	Year	KOR	KOR Hot	JPN	Sales	Album
Korean
"On/Off"	2017	—	—	—N/a	—N/a	On/Off
"Complete" (널 만난 순간)	2018	—	—	—N/a	—N/a	You Complete Me
"We Must Love" (사랑하게 될 거야)	2019	—	—	—N/a	—N/a	We Must Love
"Why"	2019	—	—	—N/a	—N/a	Go Live
"Sukhumvit Swimming" (스쿰빗스위밍)	2020	102	91	—N/a	—N/a	Spin Off
"Beautiful Beautiful"	2021	7	—	—N/a	—N/a	ONF: My Name
"Ugly Dance" (춤춰)	2021	42	—	—N/a	—N/a	City of ONF
"Popping" (여름 쏙)	2021	30	—	—N/a	—N/a	Popping
"Goosebumps"	2021	108	76	—N/a	—N/a	Goosebumps
"Your Song"	2022	193	—	—N/a	—N/a	Storage of ONF
"Love Effect"	2023	199	—	—N/a	—N/a	Love Effect
"Bye My Monster"	2024	57	—	—N/a	—N/a	Beautiful Shadow
"The Stranger"	2025	77	—	—N/a	—N/a	ONF: My Identity
"Put It Back"	2025	—	—	—N/a	—N/a	Unbroken
"Open the Door"	2026	141	—	—N/a	—N/a	ONF: My Self
Japanese
"On/Off"	2018	—N/a	—N/a	20	JPN: 5,213	Non-album singles
"Complete"	2018	—N/a	—N/a	17	JPN: 4,807	Non-album singles
"—" denotes releases that did not chart or were not released in that region.

=== Other charted songs ===
Title	Year	Peak chart positions		Album
Title	Year	KOR	KOR Hot	Album
"New World" (신새계)	2020	112	97	Road to Kingdom FINAL
"My Name Is"	2021	— (Note: "My Name Is" did not enter the Gaon Digital Chart, but peaked at number 90 on the Gaon Download Chart.)	—	ONF: My Name
"Thermometer" (온도차)	2021	— (Note: "Thermometer" did not enter the Gaon Digital Chart, but peaked at number 113 on the Gaon Download Chart.)	—	ONF: My Name
"Secret Triangle" (비밀)	2021	— (Note: "Secret Triangle" did not enter the Gaon Digital Chart, but peaked at number 103 on the Gaon Download Chart.)	—	ONF: My Name
"The Realist"	2021	— (Note: "The Realist" did not enter the Gaon Digital Chart, but peaked at number 102 on the Gaon Download Chart.)	—	ONF: My Name
"On-You (Interlude)"	2021	— (Note: "On-You (Interlude)" did not enter the Gaon Digital Chart, but peaked at number 112 on the Gaon Download Chart.)	—	ONF: My Name
"Trip Advisor" (누워서 세계 속으로)	2021	— (Note: "Trip Advisor" did not enter the Gaon Digital Chart, but peaked at number 106 on the Gaon Download Chart.)	—	ONF: My Name
"Feedback"	2021	— (Note: "Feedback" did not enter the Gaon Digital Chart, but peaked at number 120 on the Gaon Download Chart.)	—	ONF: My Name
"I.T.I.L.U"	2021	— (Note: "I.T.I.L.U" did not enter the Gaon Digital Chart, but peaked at number 114 on the Gaon Download Chart.)	—	ONF: My Name
"Beautiful Beautiful (English Ver.)"	2021	— (Note: "Beautiful Beautiful (English Ver.)" did not enter the Gaon Digital Chart, but peaked at number 145 on the Gaon Download Chart.)	—	ONF: My Name
"My Genesis (Übermensch)"	2021	— (Note: "My Genesis (Übermensch)" did not enter the Gaon Digital Chart, but peaked at number 117 on the Gaon Download Chart.)	—	City of ONF
"The Dreamer"	2021	— (Note: "The Dreamer" did not enter the Gaon Digital Chart, but peaked at number 130 on the Gaon Download Chart.)	—	City of ONF
"Summer Poem" (여름 시)	2021	— (Note: "Summer Poem" did not enter the Gaon Digital Chart, but peaked at number 84 on the Gaon Download Chart.)	—	Popping
"Summer End" (여름의 끝)	2021	— (Note: "Summer End" did not enter the Gaon Digital Chart, but peaked at number 90 on the Gaon Download Chart.)	—	Popping
"Dry Ice" (여름의 온도)	2021	— (Note: "Dry Ice" did not enter the Gaon Digital Chart, but peaked at number 91 on the Gaon Download Chart.)	—	Popping
"Summer Shape" (여름의 모양)	2021	— (Note: "Summer Shape" did not enter the Gaon Digital Chart, but peaked at number 93 on the Gaon Download Chart.)	—	Popping
"Show Must Go On"	2021	— (Note: "Show Must Go On" did not enter the Gaon Digital Chart, but peaked at number 139 on the Gaon Download Chart.)	—	Goosebumps
"Whistle"	2021	— (Note: "Whistle" did not enter the Gaon Digital Chart, but peaked at number 140 on the Gaon Download Chart.)	—	Goosebumps
"Alarm"	2021	— (Note: "Alarm" did not enter the Gaon Digital Chart, but peaked at number 148 on the Gaon Download Chart.)	—	Goosebumps
"Fat and Sugar"	2021	— (Note: "Fat and Sugar" did not enter the Gaon Digital Chart, but peaked at number 151 on the Gaon Download Chart.)	—	Goosebumps
"My Song"	2022	— (Note: "My Song" did not enter the Circle Digital Chart, but peaked at number 118 on the Circle Download Chart.)	—	Storage of ONF
"Runaway"	2022	— (Note: "Runaway" did not enter the Circle Digital Chart, but peaked at number 120 on the Circle Download Chart.)	—	Storage of ONF
"Traveler"	2022	— (Note: "Traveler" did not enter the Circle Digital Chart, but peaked at number 142 on the Circle Download Chart.)	—	Storage of ONF
"Gucci"	2022	— (Note: "Gucci" did not enter the Circle Digital Chart, but peaked at number 149 on the Circle Download Chart.)	—	Storage of ONF
"We Must Love (Remastered ver.)" (사랑하게 될 거야)	2022	— (Note: "We Must Love (Remastered ver.)" did not enter the Circle Digital Chart, but peaked at number 191 on the Circle Download Chart.)	—	Storage of ONF
"Complete (Remastered ver.)" (널 만난 순간)	2022	— (Note: "Complete (Remastered ver.)" did not enter the Circle Digital Chart, but peaked at number 198 on the Circle Download Chart.)	—	Storage of ONF
"Aphrodite"	2024	— (Note: "Aphrodite" did not enter the Circle Digital Chart, but peaked at number 57 on the Circle Download Chart.)	—	Beautiful Shadow
"Breath, Haze & Shadow"	2024	— (Note: "Breath, Haze & Shadow" did not enter the Circle Digital Chart, but peaked at number 58 on the Circle Download Chart.)	—	Beautiful Shadow
"Chemical Type"	2024	— (Note: "Chemical Type" did not enter the Circle Digital Chart, but peaked at number 59 on the Circle Download Chart.)	—	Beautiful Shadow
"Slave to the Rhythm"	2024	— (Note: "Slave to the Rhythm" did not enter the Circle Digital Chart, but peaked at number 56 on the Circle Download Chart.)	—	Beautiful Shadow

=== Soundtrack appearances ===
Title	Year	Album
"No Control"	2018	The Haunted House: Birth of Ghost Ball X OST (season 2)
"Your Day" (축제)	2018	Let's Eat 3 OST
"Pretty" (예뻐죽겠다)	2019	Chubby Romance 2 OST Part. 1
"Reset" (말야)	2019	Elsword PROJECT EL★STAR
"Not a Sad Song" (이별 노래가 아니야)	2020	Love Revolution OST Part. 1

== Awards and nominations ==
Name of the award ceremony, year presented, category, and the result of the nomination
Award ceremony	Year	Category	Result	Ref.
Asia Artist Awards	2021	Male Idol Group Popularity Award	Nominated	
Brand of the Year Awards	2021	Hot Trend Male Idol	Won	
Korea Culture Entertainment Awards	2019	K-Pop Artist Award	Won	
Korea First Brand Awards	2021	Male Idol	Won	
Seoul Music Awards	2022	Main Award	Nominated	
Seoul Music Awards	2022	K-Wave Popularity Award	Nominated	
Seoul Music Awards	2022	Popularity Award	Nominated	
Seoul Music Awards	2022	U+ Idol Best Artist Award	Nominated	
