= Joonas Angeria =

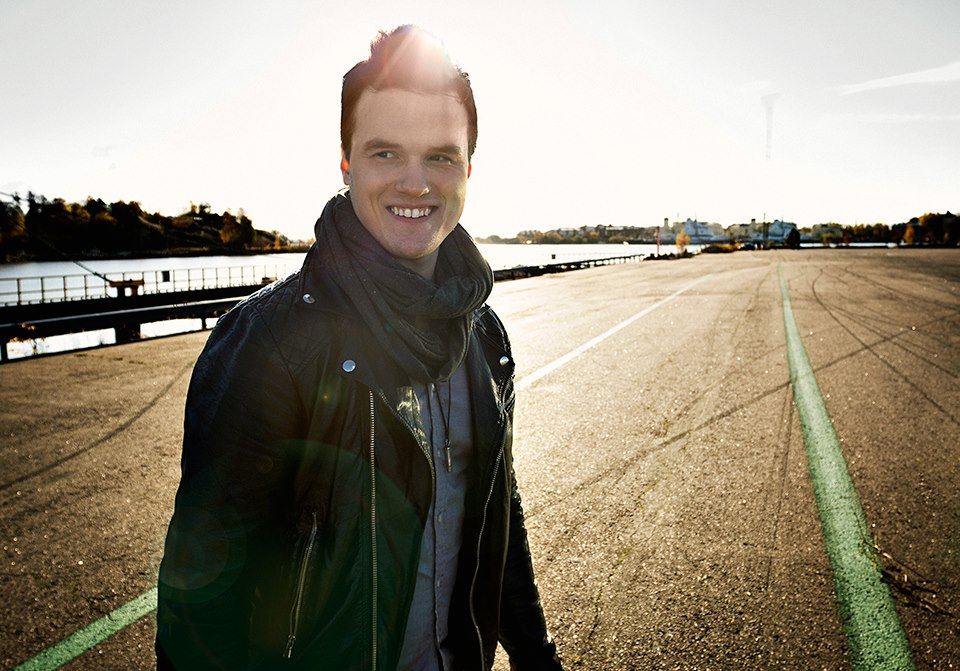

Background information
- Born: Joonas Mikael Angeria; 23 March 1989 (age 37); Rovaniemi, Finland

Joonas Angeria (born Joonas Mikael Angeria; 23 March 1989), is a Finnish music producer, songwriter and musician. He is known for writing and producing hit songs for artists such as Isac Elliot, Pentatonix, Julie Bergan, Mads Langer, Paula Vesala, Robin, and Sjur. He has won The Finnish Music Publishers Association - Award has been nominated twice as Producer of the Year at the Finnish Emma Gala.

== Discography ==
Year	Artist	Song	Album	Composers	Role
2026	Gettomasa	"Aitous ei oo myynnissä"	Aitous ei oo myynnissä (single)	Ruuben, Xrphan, MD$, Axel Kala	Vocal Producer
2026	Erika Vikman	"Adam & Steve"	Adam & Steve (single)	Rzy, Janne Rintala, Linnéa Deb	Vocal Producer
2025	Irina	"Kamala Rakkaus"	Kunnes Aurinko Nielaisee Maan	Joonas Angeria, Iivari Suosalo, Vilma Alina	Composer
2025	Samu Haber	"Karkki"	Karkki (single)	Aleksanteri Hakaniemi, Joonas Angeria, Mikko Koivunen, Tiina Vainikainen, Samu Haber	Producer, Composer
2025	Samu Haber	"Kauan Eläköön Rakkaus"	Kauan Eläköön Rakkaus (single)	Aleksanteri Hakaniemi, Mikko Koivunen, Samu Haber	Producer
2025	Isac Elliot	"Best For You"	Best For You (single)	Alexander Austheim, Anton Stubbe, Arttu Istala, Axel Ehnström, Iiro Paakkari, Ilan Kidron, Isac Elliot, Joonas Angeria, Rory Winston	Composer
2025	Nelli Matula	"Uus ikuisuus"	Uus ikuisuus (single)	Nelli Matula, Patric Sarin, Hanna Johde	Vocal Producer
2024	Samu Haber	"Seasons"	Me Free My Way	Joonas Angeria, Tomi Saario, Samu Haber	Vocal Producer
2024	Samu Haber	"You Destroyed My Life"	Me Free My Way	Nicolas Rebscher, Samu Haber	Producer
2024	Samu Haber	"Crazy"	Me Free My Way	Joonas Angeria, Tomi Saario, Samu Haber	Vocal Producer
2024	Samu Haber	"The Vehicle"	Me Free My Way	Nicolas Rebscher, Samu Haber	Producer
2024	Samu Haber	"Big Guitars"	Me Free My Way	Joonas Angeria, Tiina Vainikainen, Samu Haber	Vocal Producer
2024	Samu Haber	"Hollywood Heels"	Me Free My Way	Joonas Angeria, Maria Jane Smith, Samu Haber	Vocal Producer
2024	Janna	"Ihminen"	Ihminen	Aku Rannila, Janna Hurmerina, Saara Törmä, Minna Koivisto	Producer
2024	Janna	"Aivan Sama"	Ihminen	Aku Rannila, Erika Wikman, Fanni Sjöholm, Janna Hurmerinta, Minna Koivisto, Saara Törmä	Producer
2024	Janna	"Onnistu Elämään"	Ihminen	Aku Rannila, Janna Hurmerina, Saara Törmä	Producer
2024	Janna	"Maailma Meidän Jälkeen"	Ihminen	Janna Hurmerina, Kyösti Salokorpi, Leo Salminen	Producer
2024	Samu Haber	"Paha Päivä"	Paha Päivä (single)	Kaisa Korhonen, Lasse Piirainen, Samu Haber	Producer
2024	Jannika B	"Huomenna on kaikki paremmin"	Tetris	Joonas Angeria, Vesala	Producer, Composer
2024	Jannika B	"Tetris"	Tetris	Jannika Wirtanen, Toni Wirtanen	Producer
2024	Jannika B	"Sos"	Tetris	Jannika Wirtanen, Toni Wirtanen	Producer
2023	Pilvet Pilvet	"Unta"	Unta (single)	Kosti Koskinen	Vocal Producer
2023	Samu Haber	"Raketilla Aurinkoon"	Raketilla Aurinkoon (single)	Ida Paul, Joonas Angeria, Samu Haber	Producer, Composer
2023	Kiki	"Sokerii"	Sokerii (single)	Op Vuorinen, Petra Gavalas, Senja Myller, Tomi Saario	Vocal Producer
2023	The Two Romans	"Stars"	Stars	The Two Romans	Vocal Producer
2023	Titta	"Kesäyönä"	Muistelmat	Titta Hakala	Producer
2023	Titta	"Aina Rakastunu Surullisiin"	Muistelmat	Jonas Olsson, Kaisa Korhonen, Kalle Lindroth	Producer
2023	Titta	"Onni Pitkästä Ilosta"	Muistelmat	Joonas Angeria, Kaisa Korhonen, Titta Hakala	Producer, Composer
2023	Antti Tuisku	"Show On Ilmainen"	Sisään Ja Ulos	Antti Tuisku, Kaisa Korhonen, Kalle Lindroth, Topi Kilpinen	Producer
2023	Antti Tuisku	"Menkää Rauhassa"	Sisään Ja Ulos	Antti Tuisku, Kaisa Korhonen, Kalle Lindroth, Noora Tuuri	Producer
2023	Antti Tuisku	"Satisfyer Pro"	Sisään Ja Ulos	Antti Tuisku, Kaisa Korhonen, Kalle Lindroth, Jurek Reunamäki	Producer
2023	Antti Tuisku	"Sä Mahdut Vielä Sisään"	Sisään Ja Ulos	Antti Tuisku, Kaisa Korhonen, Kalle Lindroth, Jurek Reunamäki, Noora Tuuri	Producer
2023	Antti Tuisku	"Sisään Ja Ulos"	Sisään Ja Ulos	Kaisa Korhonen, Kalle Lindroth, Jurek Reunamäki	Producer
2023	Hanna Pakarinen	"Elämä On Elämää"	Elämä On Elämää (single)	Joonas Angeria, Jarkko Ehnqvist, Essi Launimo, Kyösti Salokorpi	Composer
2022	Vesala	"Testamentti"	Näkemiin melankolia	Joonas Angeria, Vesala	Producer, Composer
2022	Titta	"Ihmeitä"	Muistelmat	Joonas Angeria, Titta Hakala, Kaisa Korhonen	Producer, Composer
2022	Kaija Koo & Vesala	"Nopee Hopee"	Nopee Hopee (single)	Joonas Angeria, Kaija Kokkola, Vesala	Producer, Composer
2022	Sunrise Avenue	"Forever Yours (2022 Version)"	Forever Yours (2022 Version) (single)	Jukka Backlund, Samu Haber	Producer
2022	Cyan Kicks	"See The Light"	See The Light (single)	Niila Perkkiö, Susanna Aleksandra	Producer
2022	Spekti feat. Miri	"Rakkaus Kävi Täällä"	Rakkaus Kävi Täällä (single)	Emmi Hakala, Joonas Angeria, Samuli Huhtala, Tapio Heinilä	Producer, Composer
2022	Nelli Matula	"Vähän Enemmän"	Lahja / Disney Elokuva	Austin Zudeck, Justin Thunstrom, Rose Tan, Sofia Quinn	Vocal Producer
2022	Nelli Matula	"Dopamiini"	Kiltti Tyttö	Aleksanteri Hulkko, ANI, Arttu Istala, Iiro Paakkari, Nelli Matula	Producer
2022	Nelli Matula	"Sukupuuttoon"	Kiltti Tyttö	Nelli Matula	Producer
2022	Ville Veikka	"Kauniita Kuvia Maailmanlopusta"	Tästä Alkaa Tulevaisuus	Axel Ehnström, DarkTRX, Joonas Angeria, Ville Varpula	Composer
2022	Ville Veikka	"Tästä alkaa tulevaisuus"	Tästä Alkaa Tulevaisuus	Joonas Angeria, Kyösti Salokorpi, Ville Varpula	Producer, Composer
2022	Disco	"Kauniimpi Ilman Sua"	Jotain Elämää	Aki Eronen, Hanna Johde, Iivari Suosalo, Joonas Angeria, Olli Halonen	Composer
2022	Disco	"Muualla Palaa"	Jotain Elämää	Aki Eronen, Kaisa Korhonen, Olli Halonen	Vocal Producer
2022	Samu Haber	"Sä"	Pelastetaan Maailma	Joonas Angeria, Jussi Tiainen, Samu Haber	Producer, Composer
2022	Samu Haber	"Syödään Sieniä"	Pelastetaan Maailma	Joona Pietikäinen, Samu Haber, Tiina Vainikainen	Producer
2022	Samu Haber	"Hometown Gang"	Mielensä Pahoittaja - Movie Soundtrack	David McCracken, Samu Haber, Tim Hutton	Producer
2022	Titta	"Ihana Mies"	Muistelmat	Kaisa Korhonen, Mikko Koivunen, Titta Hakala	Producer
2022	BESS	"Ram pam pam"	Ram Pam Pam Single - UMK 2022	Essi Launimo, Jonas Olsson, Tomi Saario	Producer
2022	BESS	"Ram pam pam (English Version)"	Ram Pam Pam Single (English Version)	Essi Launimo, Jonas Olsson, Tomi Saario	Producer
2021	Ressu Redford	"Rakastettavin"	Costa Rica - Coffee - commercial	Jarkko Ehnqvist, Joonas Angeria, Ressu Redford	Producer, Composer
2021	The Misfits Soundtrack	"Cash In"	The Misfits Movie Soundtrack	Joonas Angeria, Mendi Moon	Producer, Composer
2021	Ville Veikka	"Aina Ku Lähet"	Tästä Alkaa Tulevaisuus EP	Joonas Angeria, Kyösti Salokorpi, Ville Varpula	Producer, Composer
2021	Kuumaa	"Tarkotin Sua"	Tarkotin Sua (single)	Johannes Brotherus, Okko Saastamoinen	Producer
2021	Kaija Koo x Pyhimys	"Sattuu"	Sattuu (single)	Jarkko Ehnqvist, Matias Keskiruokanen, Mikko Kuoppala, Patric Sarin	Producer
2021	Janna	"Maailma Meidän Jälkeen"	Ihminen	Janna Hurmerinta, Kyösti Salokorpi, Leo Salminen	Producer
2021	Aksel Kankaanranta	"Sydän Paareilla"	Sydän Paareilla (single)	Kalle Lindroth, Patric Sarin, Joonas Angeria	Producer, Composer
2021	Elias Kaskinen	"Kerran Elämässä"	Kerran Elämässä (single)	Elias Kaskinen, Joonas Angeria, Vilma Alina	Producer, Composer
2021	Kaija Koo	"Räksyttävät Koirat"	Taipumaton	Kalle Mäkipelto, Paula Vesala, Tiina Vainikainen	Producer
2021	Kaija Koo	"Mitä Vaan"	Taipumaton	Mirkka Paajanen, Petri Somer	Producer
2021	Kaija Koo	"Vikaa Ensimäistä Kertaa"	Taipumaton	Joonas Angeria, Patric Sarin, Tiina Vainikainen	Producer, Composer
2021	Kaija Koo	"Jos Rakastaa Niin Rakastaa"	Taipumaton	Ilkka Wirtanen, Patric Sarin, Vilma Alina	Producer
2021	Kaija Koo	"Riidellään Rakas"	Taipumaton	Joonas Angeria, Vilma Alina	Producer, Composer
2021	Kaija Koo	"Sateenkaari Pimeessä"	Taipumaton	Kaija Koo, Matti Mikkola, Yona	Producer
2021	Kaija Koo	"Hullut Päivät"	Taipumaton	Atso Soivio, Tiina Vainikainen	Producer
2021	Kaija Koo	"Onnellinen Loppu"	Taipumaton	Kaija Kokkola, Patric Sarin, Tiina Vainikainen	Producer
2021	Kaija Koo	"Pelkkää Voittoo"	Taipumaton	Tiina Vainikainen, Joonas Angeria	Producer, Composer
2021	Kaija Koo	"Taipumaton"	Taipumaton	Kalle Mäkipelto, Tiina Vainikainen	Producer
2021	Titta	"Elämä On Nyt"	Muistelmat	Kaisa Korhonen, Leevi Korhonen	Producer
2021	Robin Packalen ft Alex Mattson	"Hard To Love"	Hard To Love (single)	Aleksi Kaunisvesi, Robin Packalen, Tiina Vainikainen	Producer
2021	Elias Kaskinen	"Happi Loppuu"	Happi Loppuu (single)	Elias Kaskinen, Joonas Angeria, Joonas Keronen	Producer, Composer
2021	EZ	"Ideoit"	Ideoit (single)	Essi Honkonen, Joel L	Producer
2021	Illy ft. Carla Wehbe	"No Feelings"	The Space Between	Kaelyn Behr, Al Murray, Joonas Angeria, Nicholas Martin, Tiina Vainikainen	Producer, Composer
2021	Aksel	"Hurt"	Hurt (single) UMK	Gerard O'Connell, Joonas Angeria, Kalle Lindroth	Producer, Composer
2021	Oskr	"Lie"	Lie (single) UMK	David Pramik, Joonas Angeria, Oskari Ruohonen	Producer, Composer
2020	Elias Kaskinen	"Ollaanko Tämä Kesä Näin"	Laulu Rakkaudelle: Secret Song kausi 1	Olavi Uusivirta	Producer
2020	Elias Kaskinen	"Beibe"	Beibe (single)	Elias Kaskinen, Joonas Angeria	Producer, Composer
2020	Elias Kaskinen	"Pelkään Rakastaa Sua"	Pelkään Rakastaa Sua (single)	Elias Kaskinen, Joonas Angeria, Matias Keskiruokanen	Producer, Composer
2020	Elias Kaskinen	"Tanssii Pöydäl"	Tanssii pöydäl (single)	Elias Kaskinen, Henna Jokinen, Matias Keskiruokanen, Vilma Alina	Producer
2020	Ressu Redford	"Antaudun"	Vain Elämää Season 11	Anton Sonin, Leo Salminen, Reino Nordin	Producer
2020	Ressu Redford	"Liekki"	Vain Elämää Season 11	Jaakko Jakku, Klaus Suominen, Luis Herrero, Mariska	Producer
2020	Tinze feat. Jannika B	"Bae Bae"	Bae Bae (single)	Jarkko Ehnqvist, Joonas Angeria, LIL YAYO, Tia-Maria Sokka	Producer, Composer
2020	Kaija Koo	"Onnellinen Loppu"	Taipumaton	Kaija Kokkola, Patric Sarin, Tiina Vainikainen	Producer
2020	Kaija Koo	"Hullut Päivät"	Taipumaton	Atso Soivio, Tiina Vainikainen	Producer
2020	Robin Packalen	"Benefits"	Benefits (single)	John Thomas Roach, Joonas Angeria, Robin Packalen, Whitney Phillips	Producer, Composer
2020	Spekti feat. Titta	"Vain Yksi Sinä"	Vain Yksi Sinä (single)	Jimi Pääkallo, Mikko Koivunen, Niko Salmela, Samuli Huhtala	Producer
2020	Aksel	"Looking Back"	Looking Back (single)	Joonas Angeria, Whitney Phillips, Connor McDonough, Riley McDonough, Toby McDonough	Producer, Composer
2020	Alma	"LA Money"	Have U Seen Her	Justin Tranter, Nicholas Gale, Alma, Sarah Hudson	Vocal Producer
2020	Alma	"Bad News Baby"	Have U Seen Her	Alexander Suchkburgh, Ajay Bhattacharyya, Alma, Joe Janiak, Kennedi Lykken	Vocal Producer
2020	Alma	"Final Fantasy"	Have U Seen Her	Alma, Joe Janiak, Kennedi Lykken, Shawn Wasabi	Vocal Producer
2020	Alma	"Mama"	Have U Seen Her	Mark Ralph, Alma, Justin Tranter, Shawn Serrano, Timuchin Lam	Vocal Producer
2020	Jannika B	"Katso Mua"	Katso Mua (single)	Eva Louhivuori, Janne Hyöty, Jannika B	Producer
2020	Cyan Kicks	"Wish You Well"	Not Your Kind	Niila Perkkiö, Susanna Aleksandra	Producer
2020	Cyan Kicks	"Beat Of My Heart"	Not Your Kind	Niila Perkkiö, Susanna Aleksandra	Producer
2020	Nelli Matula	"Sukupuuttoon"	Kiltti Tyttö	Nelli Matula	Producer
2020	Etta	"Huomioo"	Huomioo (single)	EmmaLotta Kanth, Johannes Naukkarinen	Producer
2020	Etta	"Verhot Kii"	Verhot Kii (single)	EmmaLotta Kanth, Johannes Naukkarinen	Producer
2019	Kaija Koo	"Pelkkää Voittoo"	Taipumaton	Tiina Vainikainen, Joonas Angeria	Producer, Composer
2019	Vesala	"Meillä Kummittelee"	Etsimässä rauhaa	Paula Vesala, Joonas Angeria	Producer, Composer
2019	Vesala	"Uusia unelmia"	Etsimässä rauhaa	Paula Vesala, Joonas Angeria	Producer, Composer
2019	Vesala	"Ystävä"	Vain Elämää Season 10	Paula Vesala, Kimmo Laiho, Joonas Angeria	Producer, Composer
2019	JT Roach	"Silent Arms"	Witches Lake EP	John Thomas Roach	Producer
2019	JT Roach	"Lazy Kisses"	Lazy Kisses (single)	John Thomas Roach, Joonas Angeria, Milton Jerry Barnes, Quincy Harrison	Composer
2019	Alma	"When I Die"	When I Die (single)	Justin Tranter, Mike Sabbath, Alma	Vocal Producer
2019	Gettomasa	"Enempää"	Diplomaatti	Aleksi Lehikoinen	Vocal Producer
2019	Jannika B	"Kaksi jotka pelkää"	Toinen nainen	Heidi Paalanen, Jannika Wirtanen, Niko Lith	Producer
2019	Jannika B	"Löydät mut uudestaan"	Toinen nainen	Jannika Wirtanen, Joonas Angeria, Vilma Alina	Producer, Composer
2019	Jannika B	"Aamun takana"	Toinen nainen	Antti Hynninen, Eva Louhivuori, Jannika Wirtanen, Toni Wirtanen	Producer
2019	Jannika B	"Syyllinen"	Toinen nainen	Jannika Wirtanen	Producer
2019	Jannika B	"Mitä jos jäisit"	Toinen nainen	Jannika Wirtanen	Producer
2019	Jannika B	"Aplodit mulle"	Toinen nainen	Jannika Wirtanen	Producer
2019	Jannika B	"Muisto minusta"	Toinen nainen	Axel Ehström, Jannika Wirtanen, Klaus Suominen, Osmo Olavi Ikonen	Vocal Producer
2019	Sunrise Avenue	"Iron Sky"	Iron Sky (single)	Joonas Angeria, Samu Haber	Producer, Composer
2019	Jens	"Any Other Way"	Any Other Way (single)	Joonas Angeria, Jens, Amanda Cygnaeus	Producer, Composer
2018	Vincint	"Remember Me"	Remember Me (single)	Joonas Angeria, Vincint	Composer
2018	Niki and Gabi	"Sleep It Off"	Individual	Joonas Angeria, Whitney Phillips, Riley McDonough, Connor McDonough, Toby McDonough	Producer, Composer
2018	Vesala	"Monta Nimee"	Monta Nimee (single)	Joonas Angeria, Vesala	Producer, Composer
2018	Elastinen ft. Johanna Kurkela	"Loppuun asti"	Loppuun asti (single)	Joonas Angeria, Jurek Reunamäki, Henna Sarriola, Kimmo Laiho	Composer
2018	Kaija Koo	"Paa Mut Cooleriin"	Paa Mut Cooleriin (single)	Joonas Angeria, Iisa Pajula, JS16, Reino Nordin	Producer, Composer
2018	Julie Bergan	"Mantra"	Turn on the Lights	Joonas Angeria, Julie Bergan, John Thomas Roach	Producer, Composer
2018	Iisa	"Kiitos Exille"	Päivii, öitä	Joonas Angeria, Iisa Pajula	Producer, Composer
2018	Iisa	"Jos Se Sattuu"	Jos Se Sattuu (single)	Eppu Kosonen, Iisa Pajula	Co-producer
2018	Sjur ft. Isac Elliot	"Rich And Famous"	Rich And Famous (single)		Vocal Producer
2018	JT Roach	"Don't Keep Me Waiting"	Don't Keep Me Waiting (single)	John Thomas Roach	Producer
2017	Vesala	"Muitaki Ihmisii"	Muitaki Ihmisii (single)	Joonas Angeria, Paula Vesala	Producer, Composer
2017	Isac Elliot	"Ayo"	Ayo (single)	Joonas Angeria, Jesse McCartney, Cady Groves, Toby Lightman	Producer, Composer
2017	Mikael Gabriel x Isac Elliot	"Maailman Laidalla"	Maailman Laidalla (single)	Joonas Angeria, Patric Sarin, Lasse Kurki, Kalle Lindroth, Jarkko Ehnqvist, Isac Elliot, Mikael Gabriel	Producer, Composer
2017	Mads Langer	"Unusual"	All The Time, Sometimes	Joonas Angeria, Lindy Robbins, Mads Langer	Producer, Composer
2017	Isac Elliot	"Uncover Me"	Faith (single)	Sam Fischer	Producer
2017	Isac Elliot	"Eyes Shut"	Eyes Shut (single)		Vocal Producer
2017	Isac Elliot	"I Wrote A Song For You"	I Wrote A Song For You (single)		Vocal Producer
2017	Johnny Manuel	"Blind Faith"	Blind Faith (single)	Joonas Angeria	Producer, Composer
2017	Jari Sillanpää	"Mä elän taas"	Mä elän taas (single)		Producer
2016	Anna Abreu	"Grindaa & Flowaa"	Grindaa & Flowaa (single)	Joonas Angeria, Jarkko Ehnqvist, VilleGalle	Composer
2016	Kaija Koo	"Hillitse Itsesi"	Sinun Naisesi	Joonas Angeria, Kalle Lindroth, Saara Torma	Composer
2016	Benjamin	"Body"	Fingerprints	Joonas Angeria, Patric Sarin, Halvor Folstad, Dag Holtan-Hartwig	Producer, Composer
2016	Julie Bergan	"I Kinda Like It"	I Kinda Like It (single)	Joonas Angeria, Steph Jones, Trey Campbell, Julie Bergan	Producer, Composer
2016	Vesala	"Älä Droppaa Mun Tunnelmaa"	Vesala	Joonas Angeria, Paula Vesala, Matti Mikkola	Producer, Composer
2016	Vesala	"Tavallinen nainen"	Vesala	Paula Vesala	Co-producer
2016	Vesala	"Takkipinon Suojassa"	Vesala	Paula Vesala	Guitar, Programming
2016	Sivik	"All Day All Night"	All Day All Night (single)	Joonas Angeria, David Marshall, Chelsea Lankes, Kyle Shearer, Michael Mcgarity	Producer, Composer
2016	Sivik	"Black Light"	Winter Collection	Joonas Angeria, David Marshall, Kevin Fisher, Michael Mcgarity	Composer
2015	Krista Siegfrids	"On&Off"	On&Off (single)	Joonas Angeria, Patric Sarin, Jennifer Armstrong	Producer, Composer
2015	Roope Salminen & Koirat	"Reissumies"	Madafakin Levy	Joonas Angeria, Roope Salminen & Koirat	Composer
2015	Satin Circus	"Crossroads"	Crossroads (single)	Joonas Angeria, Patric Sarin, Satin Circus	Producer, Composer
2015	Benjamin	"Young & Restless"	Square One EP	Joonas Angeria, Tony Rodini, Ilan Kidron, Lenny Skolnik	Producer, Composer
2015	Benjamin	"Shame on Me"	Square One EP	Joonas Angeria, Patrizia Helander, Jarkko Ehnqvist, Patric Sarin, Benjamin	Producer, Composer
2015	Benjamin	"Roller Coaster"	Square One EP	Joonas Angeria, Ilan Kidron, Devrim	Producer, Composer
2015	Roope Salminen & Koirat	"Madafakin Darra"	Madafakin Levy	Joonas Angeria, Roope Salminen & Koirat, Jarkko Ehnqvist, Matias Keskiruokanen, Ida Maria Paul	Composer
2015	Botnek ft. Go Comet!	"Tremors"	Tremors (single)	Joonas Angeria, Ilan Kidron, Jarkko Ehnqvist, Botnek	Composer
2015	Krista Siegfrids	"Better On My Own"	Better On My Own (single)	Joonas Angeria, Patric Sarin, Krista Siegfrids	Producer, Composer
2015	Roope Salminen & Koirat	"Pilkun Jälkeen"	Madafakin Levy	Joonas Angeria, Roope Salminen & Koirat, Ida Maria Paul	Producer, Composer
2015	Julie Bergan	"All Hours"	All Hours (single)	Joonas Angeria, Steph Jones, Matt Parad, Julie Bergan	Producer, Composer
2015	Isac Elliot	"No One Else"	No One Else (single)		Vocal Producer
2014	Tuuli	"Nuoruus on ikuinen"	Nuoruus on ikuinen (single)	Joonas Angeria, Axel Ehnström	Producer, Composer
2014	Julie Bergan	"Younger"	Younger (single)	Joonas Angeria, Patric Sarin, Angelika Vee	Producer, Composer
2014	Pete Parkkonen	"Mitä minä sanoin"	Pete Parkkonen	Joonas Angeria, Pete Parkkonen, Janne Huttunen	Producer, Composer
2014	Pete Parkkonen	"Mun"	Pete Parkkonen	Joonas Angeria, Risto Asikainen, Niki Duuri	Producer, Composer
2014	Pete Parkkonen	"Miten sinut saa"	Pete Parkkonen	Joonas Angeria, Ilan Kidron, Simon Gain, Niki Duuri	Producer, Composer
2014	Pete Parkkonen	"En tiedä mitä kaipaat"	Pete Parkkonen	Joonas Angeria, Pete Parkkonen	Producer, Composer
2014	Pete Parkkonen	"Ei kaltaistasi"	Pete Parkkonen	Joonas Angeria, Pete Parkkonen	Producer, Composer
2014	Pete Parkkonen	"Nukut vain pitkään"	Pete Parkkonen	Joonas Angeria, Axel Ehnström, Kai Stuffel	Producer, Composer
2014	Pete Parkkonen	"Painoton"	Pete Parkkonen	Joonas Angeria, Pete Parkkonen, Eva Louhivuori	Producer, Composer
2014	Pete Parkkonen	"Kiitos"	Pete Parkkonen	Joonas Angeria, Patric Sarin, Pete Parkkonen	Producer, Composer
2014	Pete Parkkonen	"Eläviä ja kuolleita"	Pete Parkkonen	Joonas Angeria, Pete Parkkonen, Jouni Hynynen	Producer, Composer
2014	Satin Circus	"Expectations"	Expectations (single)		Producer
2014	Pentatonix	"See Through"	PTX Vol 3	Joonas Angeria, Kasmir, Kerli Kõiv	Producer, Composer
2014	Benjamin	"Underdogs"	Fingerprints	Joonas Angeria, Phoebe Ryan, Nate Cyphert	Producer, Composer
2013	Giedre	"Karma Is a Bitch"	Karma Is a Bitch (single)	Joonas Angeria, Jennifer Armstrong, Simon Heeger	Producer, Composer
2013	Isac Elliot	"Are You Gonna Be My Girl"	Wake Up World (album)	Joonas Angeria, Katrina Noorbergen, Shalamon Baskin, Jennifer Armstrong	Producer, Composer
2013	Isac Elliot	"First Kiss"	Wake Up World (album)	Joonas Angeria, Jennifer Armstrong, Tracy Lipp, Tero Potila, Johanna Salomaa	Producer, Composer
2013	Isac Elliot	"Let's Lie"	Wake Up World (album)	Joonas Angeria, Axel Ehnström	Producer, Composer
2013	Isac Elliot	"New Way Home"	Wake Up World (album)	Joonas Angeria, Ilan Kidron, Alexander Austheim, Axel Ehnström	Producer, Composer
2013	Isac Elliot	"Paper Plane"	Wake Up World (album)	Joonas Angeria, Patric Sarin, Milos Rosas	Producer, Composer
2013	Isac Elliot	"Party Alarm"	Wake Up World (album)	Joonas Angeria, Axel Ehnström, Jonas Dueholm	Producer, Composer
2013	Isac Elliot	"Sweet Talk"	Wake Up World (album)	Katrina Noorbergen, Andreas Mørck, Sune Lynge Rasmussen, Joonas Angeria, Jennifer Armstrong	Producer, Composer
2013	Isac Elliot	"No 1"	Wake Up World (album)		Producer
2013	Isac Elliot	"Can't Give Up On Love"	Wake Up World (album)		Producer
2013	Isac Elliot	"Angel"	Wake Up World (album)		Producer
2013	Isac Elliot	"Dream Big"	Wake Up World – The Ellioteer Edition	Joonas Angeria, Ole Hegle, Torgeir Kristiansen	Producer, Composer
2013	Nimetön	"Anna jotain"	Anna jotain (single)	Joonas Angeria, Jonas Dueholm	Composer
2013	Robin	"Onnellinen"	Boom Kah	Joonas Angeria, Jonas Olsson, Heigo Anto, Robin, Pekka Eronen	Producer, Composer
2013	Robin	"Ei välii"	Boom Kah		Producer
2012	Martti Saarinen	"Vahvaa ja leveää"	Martti Saarinen	Joonas Angeria, Janne Huttunen, Johanna Havu	Composer
2012	Nimetön	"Kuuleeko kukaan"	En jää tuleen makaamaan	Joonas Angeria	Composer
2012	Nimetön	"Juulia"	En jää tuleen makaamaan	Joonas Angeria	Composer
2012	Nimetön	"Kuinka mä susta tykkään"	En jää tuleen makaamaan	Joonas Angeria	Composer
2012	Nimetön	"Käännä pää"	En jää tuleen makaamaan	Joonas Angeria	Composer
2012	Nimetön	"Legendaa"	En jää tuleen makaamaan	Joonas Angeria	Composer
2012	Nimetön	"Peili"	En jää tuleen makaamaan	Joonas Angeria	Composer
2012	Nimetön	"Saisin sut jäämään"	En jää tuleen makaamaan	Joonas Angeria	Composer
2012	Nimetön	"Valoon"	En jää tuleen makaamaan	Joonas Angeria	Composer
