= Firevision =

Finnish electropop duo

- Origin: Finland
- Genres: Electropop
- Years active: 2002-2008
- Members: Mikko Tamminen; Arttu Peljo

Firevision was a Finnish electropop duo made up of Mikko Tamminen and Arttu Peljo. Prior to forming Firevision, Tamminen had already been in a band called Vaasalaiset Kansiot.

Firevision was established in 2002, and had its debut and sole album The Game You Play that was released the same year. The band enjoyed chart success with "Stars" and "Truth" both taken from the album. The duo split up in 2008 declaring they could possibly continue cooperating on various projects.

== After break-up ==
The duo split each going to separate musical project. Mikko Tamminen renamed as Setä Tamu had a solo musical career as well as various projects including the duo with Kuningas Pähkinä called Kuningas Pähkinä & Setä Tamu and later the trio formation Yön Polte made up of Tamu, Pähkinä and Stig.

== Discography ==
=== Albums ===
Year	Title	Peak positions
Year	Title	FIN
2003	The Game You Play	15

=== Singles ===
Year	Title	Peak chart positions	Album
Year	Title	FIN	Album
2002	"Music Lover"	–	The Game You Play
2002	"The Game You Play"	–	The Game You Play
2002	"Stars"	4	The Game You Play
2002	"Truth"	17	The Game You Play
