= Kuningas Pähkinä & Setä Tamu =

Finnish musical duo

Kuningas Pähkinä & Setä Tamu is a Finnish collaborating duo starting 2000, made up of rapper Kuningas Pähkinä and Setä Tamu. They released an initial EP Kaikki suvussa in 2000, and had a successful single "Heitä paita vittuun" in 2003. Their first studio album, Kylpyammeellinen hittejä, came out in 2004.

However the duo's most successful release is the 2012 single "Hei Scully," which peaked at number two on the Official Finnish Singles Chart.

Setä Tamu, Kuningas Pähkinä and Stig joined forces in 2012 as the group Yön Polte and with the single "Tyttö sinä olet meritähti". The song peaked at number seven on the Official Finnish Singles Chart.

== Discography ==
=== Albums ===
Year	Title	Peak positions
Year	Title	FIN
2004	Kylpyammeellinen hittejä	–

=== EPs ===
- Kaikki suvussa (EP, 2000)
- "Heitä paita vittuun" (single, 2003)
- Syksyllä Palmasiin (EP, 2011)
- Hiitti (EP, 2012)

=== Singles ===
Year	Title	Peak positions
Year	Title	FIN
2003	"Heitä paita vittuun"	–
2012	"Hei Scully"	2
