= Sandeul =

South Korean singer-songwriter (born 1992)

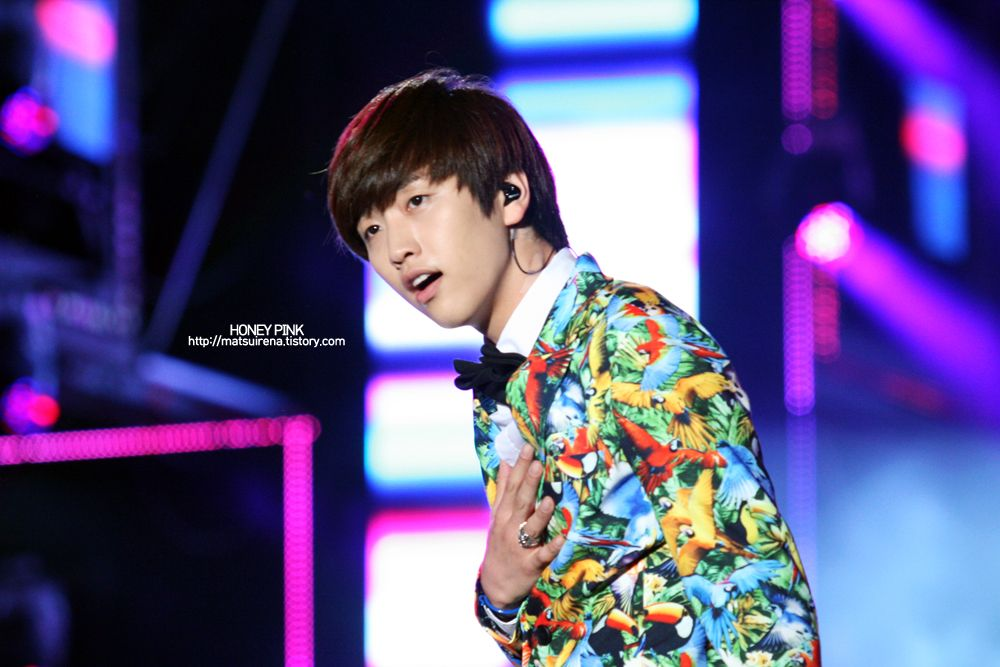
- Sandeul in 2012

Background information
- Born: Lee Jung-hwan; March 20, 1992 (age 34); Busan, South Korea
- Genres: K-pop
- Occupations: Singer; songwriter; actor
- Instrument: Vocals
- Years active: 2011–present
- Label: WM
- Member of: B1A4

Korean name
- Hangul: 이정환
- Hanja: 李征桓
- RR: I Jeonghwan
- MR: I Chŏnghwan

Stage name
- Hangul: 산들
- RR: Sandeul
- MR: Sandŭl

Lee Jung-hwan (Korean: 이정환; born March 20, 1992), known professionally as Sandeul (Korean: 산들) is a South Korean singer-songwriter. He is a member of the South Korean boy group B1A4, that debuted on April 23, 2011. He debuted as a solo artist on October 4, 2016.

== Career ==
=== Pre-debut ===
Lee was known to have competed in numerous singing contests prior to training and debut. Lee was approached by a company agent after performing a song by Kim Yeon-woo in a talent show. He then underwent a training period of two years.

=== 2011: Debut with B1A4 ===
After years of training, Lee joined as the main vocalist of B1A4. On April 11, 2011, WM Entertainment unveiled Lee as the fourth member to be revealed after the release of the news of B1A4 along with Jinyoung, Baro and Gongchan's pictures. CNU was revealed the next day.

On April 20, 2011, B1A4 released their debut Track "OK" and mini album Let's Fly and made their debut on April 23, 2011, on MBC Show! Music Core.

After their debut, B1A4 was invited to star in MTV's reality show Match Up with Block B. As one of the projects for the show, B1A4 filmed a music video for "Only Learnt The Bad Things (못된 것만 배워서)."

=== 2012–2014: Musicals and Immortal Songs ===
In May 2012, Lee made his musical debut in Brothers Were Brave, as Joo Bong. In addition, alongside some of B1A4 members, he competed on Immortal Songs number of times. In December, on the Kim Bum Ryong special, he (with Baro) took the trophy for the first time, performing "The Way to Live Like a Man".

In 2013, he entered Myongji University as a Musical Theater undergraduate. Lee continued competing on Immortal Songs. He took his second win on Yim Jae-beom special, dedicating his performance, "I'm a Candle before You", to his late aunt. In October, Lee was cast for the lead role in the musical The Thousandth Man.

In 2014, Lee was cast for the role of Elvis Presley, in the musical All Shook Up. The musical is a remake of the 2004 American jukebox musical, created from Elvis Presley's songs and based on William Shakespeare's Twelfth Night.

=== 2015–2016: King of Mask Singer, other singing programs and Solo Debut ===
In April 2015, Lee competed on Mystery Music Show: King of Mask Singer. A singing competition program, where masked celebrities sing and their identities are revealed only after being eliminated. Under "Flowering Silky Fowl" stage name he became the runner-up of the first generation and, as a result, gained more recognition for his vocal ability. Afterwards, he joined as a fixed panelist on the program. On episode 17 opening, Lee performed a special duet with his role model, Kim Yeon-woo, singing "Is It Still Beautiful?" by Toy.

Lee got his fourth musical role in July, as Prince Christopher in Cinderella. He also acted in the web drama Loss:Time:Life.

In February 2016, Lee was cast for the role of D'Artagnan in the musical The Three Musketeers.

Throughout 2016 Lee made numerous appearances on singing competition shows: He returned to do a single performance on Immortal Songs alone, and later that year with B1A4 as a full group for the first time. In April, Lee made his first appearance on Duet Song Festival with Jo Seon-young. They have been the first pair to make 3 consecutive wins, and crowned King of Kings on a special episode. He returned to the show to perform a special duet with Ken(VIXX) on episode 28. In addition, Lee made collaborations on JTBC's Two Yoo Project Sugar Man and Girl Spirit with Baek A-yeon and Oh My Girl's Seunghee respectively. He also returned to King of Mask Singer, as a guest panelist. On October 5, Lee participated in the Special Live: Your Choice! King of Mask Singer – a special live edition that brings back contestants who had been eliminated in previous episodes, and a special Mask King is chosen from live voting. Lee was chosen to be King of the live episode and was able to perform as a challenger in Episode 84. However, on that episode he lost to Ali and Kim Dong-myung of Boohwal.

In October 2016, Lee debuted as a solo artist with extended play Stay As You Are, where he first took part in writing and composing songs.

=== 2017–2018: Varied activities and Starry Night's DJ ===
In February 2017, Lee became the first male idol to be appointed as an honorary ambassador for the presidential election. He was appointed alongside Kim Yeon-woo, Jung Ae-ri, Jin Se-yeon, Jang Na-ra and Yoon Joo-sang. Later, he joined singer Kim Yeon-woo for a special performance in You Hee-yeol's Sketchbook, urging people to vote. In addition, a video of Kim and Lee performing a remake of the song "As One Says" was released by The National Election Commission.

In June 2017, Lee returned to Immortal Songs 2 on the Park Mi-kyung special, winning his third trophy with the song "Like a Dandelion Spore". A month later, on Summer Spent Together with Friends special, singing Yim Jae-beom's "Flight" as a duet with actor Ahn Se-ha, he took his forth trophy. At the end of that year Lee and Ahn participated in Best of the Best Competition special.

On July 6, 2017, the song "Oppa", a collaboration of Lee and Yoo Seung-woo, was released. In August, Lee featured in Primary's Pop EP.

In August 2017, Lee was confirmed to play the male lead in the musical "Thirty Something".

Lee first participated in creating B1A4's album, co-writing and co-composing the song "Like a Child", in the EP Rollin'.

On July 6, 2018, Lee was announced to be the 26th DJ for MBC's late night radio show "Starry Night" starting on July 9.

In August 2018, Lee was cast to play in the musical "Iron Mask", taking the dual part of the twins Louis and Philippe.

=== 2019–present: Solo ventures ===
In March 2019, Lee participated in KBS2's In Sync\Kiss, a duet matching show. Partnered with rapper DinDin singing Lee Hi's "Breathe" they won.

During April and May 2019, WM Entertainment announced Lee is preparing for his first solo comeback, with his second EP to be released on June 3. In addition, Lee's agency informed he would hold his first Japanese and Korean solo concerts in June.

In November 2019, Lee reprised his role in the musical "Iron Mask". In February 2020, Lee took the supporting role of Clive Owen in the musical "Sherlock Holmes: The Missing Children".

On December 29, 2019, Lee received an Excellence Award for his work as a DJ in the radio show "Starry Night". On May 10, 2020, after a year and ten months, Lee stepped down as the host of the radio show.

For the first time, as a part of the variety program My Music Teacher, Mingalabar, Lee alongside his co-stars (Yoon Do-hyun, Sandara Park, Kim Jae-hwan, JooE and Yoo Jae-hwan) created children's songs.

On May 27, 2020, "Lazy Me" was released, the first song of what meant to be three part series of digital singles project called "생각집" (lit. House of Thoughts), and was followed by "Smile Box" on July 2. On August 5, My Little Thought Ep.01, Lee's third EP, was released as part three of the series, including the previous singles and "Summer Day Summer Night" as the title track. On July 20, 2020, Lee released a remake of Saevom's "Slightly Tipsy" as a soundtrack to the popular webtoon She is My Type. The remake became Lee's best-charting song to date, peaking at second on both the monthly Gaon Digital Chart and Billboard's K-pop Hot 100 singles chart. On April 8, 2021, "Slightly Tipsy" received a platinum certification for streaming by Gaon.

In April 2021, Lee was confirmed to play the lead role in the musical "1976 Harlan County", that is based on the American documentary film Harlan County, USA.

== Personal life ==
=== Military service ===
Sandeul enlisted in the mandatory military service on November 11, 2021. After completing five weeks of compulsory training, Sandeul served as a social worker. He was discharged from military service on August 10, 2023.

== Discography ==
=== Extended plays ===
Title	Details	Peak chart positions		Sales
Title	Details	KOR	JPN	Sales
Stay As You Are	Released: October 4, 2016; Label: WM Entertainment, LOEN Entertainment; Formats: CD, digital download; Track listing: 1. Stay As You Are (그렇게 있어 줘); 2. Home (집); 3. My Childhood Story (나의 어릴 적 이야기); 4. Ya! (야!) (feat. Wheein of Mamamoo); 5. The Way With You (같이 걷는 길)	5	—	KOR: 25,411
One Fine Day	Released: June 3, 2019; Label: WM Entertainment, Kakao M; Formats: CD, digital download; Track listing: 1. One Fine Day (날씨 좋은 날); 2. This Love (이 사랑); 3. Oblique Line (사선); 4. Raindrop (빗소리); 5. Love, Always You (with Gongchan); 6. I'm Fine (괜찮아요)	9	48	KOR: 13,931
My Little Thought Ep.01	Released: August 5, 2020; Label: WM Entertainment, Sony Music; Formats: CD, digital download; Track listing: 1. Summer Day Summer Night (여름날 여름밤); 2. Letter (편지); 3. Smile Box (작은 상자); 4. Lazy Me (게으른 나); 5. Thank you (고마워)	7	23	KOR: 11,431; JPN: 1,440

=== Singles ===
==== As lead artist ====
Title	Year	Peak chart positions	Sales	Album
Title	Year	KOR	Sales	Album
"Stay As You Are" (그렇게 있어 줘)	2016	21	KOR: 123,201+	Stay As You Are
"One Fine Day" (날씨 좋은 날)	2019	161	—N/a	One Fine Day
"Lazy Me" (게으른 나)	2020	— (Note: "Lazy Me" did not enter the Gaon Digital Chart, but appeared at number 109 on the component Download chart.)	—N/a	My Little Thought Ep.01
"Smile Box" (작은 상자)	2020	— (Note: "Smile Box" did not enter the Gaon Digital Chart, but appeared at number 149 on the component Download chart.)	—N/a	My Little Thought Ep.01
"Summer Day Summer Night" (여름날 여름밤)	2020	— (Note: "Summer Day Summer Night" did not enter the Gaon Digital Chart, but appeared at number 113 on the component Download chart.)	—N/a	My Little Thought Ep.01
"More Than Words"	2021	115	—N/a	Single
"Good Luck"	2025	— (Note: "Good Luck" did not enter the Circle Digital Chart, but appeared at number 50 on the component Download chart.)	—N/a	Single
"—" denotes releases that did not chart or were not released in that region.

==== As featured artist ====
Title	Year	Peak chart positions	Sales	Album
Title	Year	KOR	Sales	Album
"Pick Up" (Primary feat. Sandeul)	2017	81	KOR: 30,977	Pop
"Breathe" (DinDin feat. Sandeul)	2019	—	—N/a	Goodbye My Twenties
"—" denotes releases that did not chart or were not released in that region.

==== Collaborations ====
Title	Year	Peak chart positions	Sales	Album
Title	Year	KOR	Sales	Album
"Oppa" (Yoo Seung-woo X Sandeul)	2017	40	KOR: 66,407+	Single
"Because We Are Connected" (Yang Yo-seob, Sandeul, Jung Seung-hwan)	2018	—	—N/a	Single
"I Miss You" (CookieBox X Sandeul)	2021	— (Note: "I Miss You" did not enter the Gaon Digital Chart, but appeared at number 143 on the component Download chart.)	—N/a	Single
"It's Alright" (Ahn Se-ha with Sandeul)	2022	— (Note: "It's Alright" did not enter the Gaon Digital Chart, but appeared at number 140 on the component Download chart.)	—N/a	Single
"366 Days" HELLO! WM_V(Sandeul, Hyojung, Hyojin)	2024	—	—N/a	Single
"—" denotes releases that did not chart or were not released in that region.

=== Other charted songs ===
Title	Year	Peak chart positions	Sales	Album
Title	Year	KOR	Sales	Album
"Ya!" (feat. Wheein of Mamamoo)	2016	— (Note: "Ya!", "The Way With You", and "Home" did not enter the Gaon Digital Chart, but appeared at number 78, 96 and 97 respectively on the component Download chart.)	KOR: 22,709+	Stay As You Are
"The Way With You"	2016	—	KOR: 18,158+	Stay As You Are
"Home"	2016	—	KOR: 18,072+	Stay As You Are
"—" denotes releases that did not chart or were not released in that region.

=== Soundtrack appearances ===
Title	Year	Peak chart positions		Sales	Album
Title	Year	KOR	KOR Hot	Sales	Album
"Because It Hurts" (아파서)	2014	51	—	KOR: 37,728	God's Gift: 14 Days OST
"Swallowing My Heart" (마음을 삼킨다)	2016	22	—	KOR: 138,514	Love in the Moonlight OST
"One More Step" (한 걸음만 더)	2017	— (Note: "One More Step" did not enter the Gaon Digital Chart, but appeared at number 99 on the component Download chart.)	—	KOR: 14,624	Introverted Boss OST
"Tell Me" (말해줘)	2017	—	—	—N/a	Manhole OST
"Other World"	2018	—	—	—N/a	Bad Guys 2 OST
"Here I Am"	2018	—	—	—N/a	Lovely Horribly OST
"Fly High" (날아올라)	2019	—	—	—N/a	The Secret Life of My Secretary OST
"Lingering Inside Me" (내 안에 맴돌아)	2019	—	—	—N/a	The Tale of Nokdu OST
"Hope to Reach You" (너에게 닿기를)	2019	—	—	—N/a	Wannabe Challenge (game) OST
"Slightly Tipsy" (취기를 빌려)	2020	2	2	—N/a	She is My Type (webtoon)
"Lonesome Diary" (어른 일기)	2020	194	—	—N/a	Start-Up OST
"Dark Tales"	2020	—	—	—N/a	Underworld (game) OST
"I Feel You" (만져져)	2021	— (Note: "I Feel You" did not enter the Gaon Digital Chart, but appeared at number 18 on the component Download chart.)	—	—N/a	She Would Never Know OST
"The One And Only You" (그대 한 사람)	2021	113	—	—N/a	The Moon During the Day (webtoon)
"The Image of You (Remains in My Memory)" (내 기억 속에 남아있는 그대 모습은)	2021	45	—	—N/a	Hometown Cha-Cha-Cha OST
"You're leaving like the season" (너는 계절처럼 멀어져 가네)	2023	— (Note: "You're leaving like the season" did not enter the Circle Digital Chart, but appeared at number 72 on the component Download chart.)	—	—N/a	Castaway Diva OST
"Butterfly"	2024	—	—	—N/a	Wedding Impossible OST
"You Made Me Smile" (너 때문이야)	2025	— (Note: "You Made Me Smile" did not enter the Circle Digital Chart, but appeared at number 94 on the component Download chart.)	—	—N/a	Second Shot at Love OST
"—" denotes releases that did not chart or were not released in that region.

=== Production and songwriting credits ===
Year	Album	Artist	Song	Lyrics		Music	
Year	Album	Artist	Song	Credited	With/other	Credited	With/other
2016	Stay As You Are	Sandeul	"My Childhood Story"	Yes	—N/a	No	Yook Joong Wan
2016	Stay As You Are	Sandeul	"Ya!" (feat. Wheein)	Yes	RWAM, Moon Minseok	Yes	RWAM, Moon Minseok
2017	Rollin'	B1A4	"Like A Child"	Yes	Team Columbus, Baro	Yes	Team Columbus
2018	5	B1A4	"Humming Bird"	Yes	Team Columbus, SoichiroK	Yes	Team Columbus
2019	One Fine Day	Sandeul	"This Love"	Yes	—	Yes	Antti Hynninen, Will Church
2019	One Fine Day	Sandeul	"Love, Always You" (with Gongchan)	Yes	Moon Jungkyu, Kim Junseop	No	Moon Jungkyu, Kim Junseop
2019	One Fine Day	Sandeul	"I'm Fine"	Yes	Team Columbus	Yes	Team Columbus
2019	Goodbye My Twenties	DinDin	"Breathe" (feat. Sandeul)	Yes	DinDin, Coup D'État	Yes	DinDin, Coup D'État, JUNIK
2020	My Little Thought Ep.01	Sandeul	"Summer Day Summer Night"	Yes	—	Yes	Moon Jungkyu
2020	My Little Thought Ep.01	Sandeul	"Letter"	Yes	Team Columbus	Yes	Team Columbus
2020	My Little Thought Ep.01	Sandeul	"Smile Box"	Yes	—	Yes	Wouter Hamel, Moon Jungkyu
2020	My Little Thought Ep.01	Sandeul	"Lazy Me"	Yes	Team Columbus	Yes	Team Columbus
2020	My Little Thought Ep.01	Sandeul	"Thank you"	Yes	Hen	Yes	Hen
2020	Origine	B1A4					
2020	Origine	B1A4	"Diving"	No	CNU, RWAM	Yes	CNU, RWAM
2020	Origine	B1A4	"Water Drop"	Yes	Team Columbus	Yes	Team Columbus
2020	Origine	B1A4	"Plodding"	Yes	Team Columbus	Yes	Team Columbus
2020	Origine	B1A4	"For BANA"	Yes	CNU, Gongchan, RWAM	Yes	CNU, RWAM, Cheong Wangee
2021	Single	B1A4	"10 TIMES"	Yes	CNU, Gongchan	No	CNU, RWAM
2021	Single	B1A4	"Adore you"	Yes	RWAM	Yes	RWAM, Cheong Wangee
2024	CONNECT	B1A4	"When You Call My Name"	Yes	Team Columbus	Yes	Team Columbus
2024	CONNECT	B1A4	"Still In My Heart"	Yes	CNU, Gongchan	Yes	Team Columbus
2026	SET	B1A4	"CPR"	Yes	CNU, Gongchan	No	RWAM, Isak Alvedahl, Malin Christin

== Filmography ==
=== Television dramas ===
- 2015: Naver TV Loss: Time: Life – Min-soo
- 2020: MBC Lonely Enough to Love – Patient (Cameo in Ep. 1)

=== Musical theater ===
Year	Title	Role
2012	Brother Were Brave	Lee Joong-bong
2013	The Thousandth Man	Kim Eung-suk
2014	All Shook Up	Elvis
2015	Cinderella	Prince Christopher
2016	The Three Musketeers	d'Artagnan
2017	Thirty Something	young Hyun-sik
2018	Iron Mask	King Louis XIV/Philippe
2019	Iron Mask	King Louis XIV/Philippe
2020	Sherlock Holmes: The Missing Children	Clive Owen
2021	1976 Harlan County	Daniel
2024	Next to Normal	Gabe
2024	Who lives in the Kuroi Mansion?	Haewoong
2025	Death Note	L

== Concerts ==
- 2019: HIBIKI (Japan)
- 2019: Wind Forest (Korea)

== Awards and nominations ==
Year	Award	Category	Nominated work	Result
2014	16th Seoul International Youth Film Festival	Best OST by a Male Artist	"Because It Hurts" (God's Gift: 14 Days OST)	Nominated
2015	2015 MBC Entertainment Awards	Best Male Rookie in Music\Talk Show	King of Masked Singer	Nominated
2019	2019 MBC Entertainment Awards	Excellence in Radio	Sandeul's Starry Night	Won
2020	2020 Mnet Asian Music Awards	Best OST	"Slightly Tipsy" (She is My Type OST)	Nominated
2021	30th Seoul Music Awards	Best Ballad	"Slightly Tipsy"	Won
2022	31st Seoul Music Awards	Best OST	"The Image of You (Remains in My Memory)" (Hometown Cha-Cha-Cha OST)	Nominated
