= Elements Music =

Finnish music publishing company

Elements Music is an independent music publishing and producer management company based in Helsinki, Finland.

Elements Music has had a multitude of number one albums and singles domestically as well as internationally and has been awarded the "Music Publisher of the Year" prize in 2014, 2015 and 2016 at the annual Industry Awards. International artists who have recorded songs published by Elements Music include Pentatonix, Lost Frequencies, Alle Farben, Jake Miller, Tiffany Gia, Michael Schulte, Jolin Tsai, Kara, Shinee ja Sean Kingston and, for example, Robin, Isac Elliot, Anna Abreu, Antti Tuisku, Mikael Gabriel, Suvi Teräsniska in Finland.

The company's offices are located at The Grind Studios and is owned and run by the CEO, Tommi Tuomainen and A&R, Eero Tolppanen. The company's house writer roster currently consists of the following artists, writers, and producers:

== Roster ==
=== Artists ===
- Kasmir
- Nopsajalka
- Miro Miikael
- Alex Mattson
- Alisky
- Møtions
- Bess
- View
- Visti
- Softengine

=== Writers ===
- Axel Ehnström
- Risto Asikainen
- Mikko Kuoppala
- Maija Vilkkumaa
- Tobias Granbacka
- Kyösti Salokorpi
- Joel Melasniemi
- Väinö Wallenius
- Heidi Maria Paalanen

=== Producers ===
- Mikko Tamminen
- Pasi Siitonen
- Matias Melleri
- Antti Hynninen
- OP Vuorinen
- Leo Jupiter
- Samuli Sirviö
- Jonas Olsson
- Niko Lith
