= New Way Home =

Single by Isac Elliot

from the album Wake Up World
- Released: 14 February 2013
- Recorded: 2012
- Genre: Dance-pop
- Length: 3:40
- Label: Sony Music Entertainment
- Songwriters: Joonas Angeria, Ilan Kidron, Rory Winston, Rykkinnfella, Axel Ehnström

Isac Elliot singles chronology
"New Way Home" (2013)	"First Kiss" (2013)

"New Way Home" is a song by Finnish pop singer Isac Elliot. The song was released as a digital download on 14 February 2013 as the lead single from his debut studio album Wake Up World (2013). The song peaked at number one on the Official Finnish Singles Chart.

== Music video ==
A music video to accompany the release of "New Way Home" was first released onto YouTube on 4 April 2013 at a total length of three minutes and forty-three seconds.

== Track listing ==
Digital download
No.	Title	Length
1.	"New Way Home"	3:40

== Chart performance ==
Chart (2013)	Peak position
Finland (Suomen virallinen lista)	1
Finland Airplay (Radiosoittolista)	4
Norway (VG-lista)	14

== Certifications ==
Region	Certification	Certified units/sales
Finland (Musiikkituottajat)	Gold	35,979
Norway (IFPI Norway)	Platinum	10,000^{*}
^{*} Sales figures based on certification alone.

== Release history ==
Region	Date	Format	Label
Finland	14 February 2013	Digital download	Sony Music Entertainment
