= Rollin' (B1A4 EP) =

EP by B1A4
- Released: September 27, 2017
- Genre: K-pop; Dance
- Length: 20:35
- Language: Korean
- Label: WM Entertainment; LOEN Entertainment
- Producer: Jung Jin-young

B1A4 chronology
Good Timing (2016)	Rollin' (2017)	Origine (2020)

Singles from Rollin'
- 1. "Rollin'" Released: September 25, 2017

Music video
- "Rollin'" on YouTube

Rollin' is the seventh extended play by South Korean boy group B1A4. It was released on September 25, 2017, by WM Entertainment and distributed by LOEN Entertainment. The EP consisted of six tracks with the title track "Rollin'". This is also the last album with the members Jinyoung and Baro, before their departure from the group in June 2018.

== Background and release ==
On September 18, 2017, WM Entertainment announced the upcoming release of B1A4's mini-album Rollin' on September 27, alongside a teaser schedule and three jacket images shot in Australia. The track list was revealed on September 19, 2017.

== Track listing ==
No.	Title	Lyrics	Music	Arrangement	Length
1.	"Rollin'"	Jinyoung; Baro	Jinyoung	Jinyoung	3:06
2.	"너는 내가 필요해"	Jinyoung; Baro	Jinyoung	Jinyoung; 강명신	3:40
3.	"Love Emotion"	Jinyoung; Baro	Jinyoung; 문정규	Jinyoung; 문정규	3:14
4.	"Smile Mask"	Jinyoung; Baro	Jinyoung	Jinyoung; 노은종; 강명신	3:56
5.	"내게 전화해"	CNU; Baro	CNU; 최명환	최명환	3:23
6.	"아이처럼"	Sandeul; Baro	팀콜럼버스; Sandeul	팀콜럼버스	3:16
Total length:					20:35

== Charts ==
=== Weekly charts ===
Chart (2017)	Peak position
South Korean Albums (Gaon Album Chart)	1
Japanese Albums (Oricon Albums Chart)	13

=== Monthly charts ===
Chart (2017)	Peak position
South Korean Albums (Gaon Album Chart)	6

== Release history ==
Country	Date	Label	Format
South Korea	September 25, 2017	WM Entertainment; LOEN Entertainment	CD, digital download
Various	September 25, 2017	WM Entertainment; LOEN Entertainment	CD, digital download
