= Sunday Songs =

Studio album by Paradise Oskar
- Released: 2 May 2011
- Recorded: 2010–2011
- Genre: Pop
- Label: Warner Music Finland

Singles from Sunday Songs
- 1. "Da Da Dam" Released: February 16, 2011; 2. "Sunday Everyday" Released: June 6, 2011

Sunday Songs is the debut album from Finnish singer-songwriter Paradise Oskar, it was released on May 2, 2011. The first single released from the album "Da Da Dam" was released on 16 February 2011.

== Singles ==
- "Da Da Dam" was the first single released from the album, Paradise Oskar sang the song at the Eurovision Song Contest 2011 for Finland in the final Paradise scored 57 points and finished 21st.
- "Sunday Everyday" was the second single released from the album, it was released on 6 June 2011.

== Track listing ==
No.	Title	Length
1.	"Da Da Dam"	3:06
2.	"Jimmy's Song"	3:05
3.	"Sarah the Sparrow"	3:24
4.	"Stupid Little Fool"	3:24
5.	"Just Leave"	3:24
6.	"Sunday Everyday"	3:06
7.	"Miss Nobody"	4:02
8.	"Dear Mother"	3:38
9.	"The Invisible Ones"	3:30
10.	"Da Da Dam" (Acoustic Version)	3:16

== Charts ==
Chart (2011)	Peak position
Finnish Albums Chart	4

== Release history ==
Country	Date	Format	Label
Finland	2 May 2011	Digital download	Warner Music Finland
Worldwide	2 May 2011	Digital download	Warner Music Finland
