= Antti Hynninen (musician) =

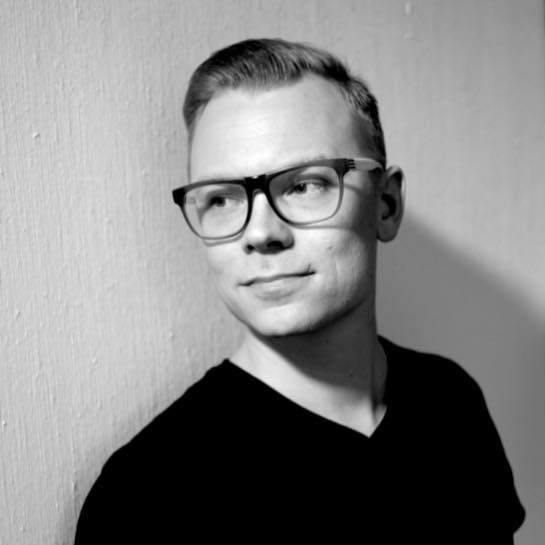

Background information
- Born: Antti Hynninen
- Genres: Jazz; pop; urban; hip hop
- Occupations: Producer; songwriter; multi-instrumentalist
- Instruments: Saxophone
- Years active: 2000–present
- Labels: Elements Music

Antti Hynninen (born in 1980) is a Finnish music producer, songwriter and multi-instrumentalist based in Helsinki. He is best known for his work and influence in the Finnish jazz scene and producing for Phoebe Ryan’s ‘’James’’ EP and Twice’s ‘’Twicetagram’’ album, which sold over 300 000 copies in 2017.

== Career as a songwriter ==
Building on his career with jazz music, Hynninen has since found success in the world of songwriting. Signing with Elements Music in 2016, his production & writing credits can be found on the songs of international artists like Phoebe Ryan, the South Korean girl group Twice and the German rapper GreeeN. His writing credits among Finnish artists include Spekti, Niila, Jesse Kaikuranta, Lucas and Cheek.

== Career in jazz music ==
Hynninen has been working professionally in the realm of jazz, nu-soul and funk since the early 2000s. He graduated from the Pop & Jazz Conservatory as a music pedagogue in 2006, later continuing his studies in The Sibelius Academy’s jazz music department. He’s known for performing and producing in his own bands Rime and Auteur Jazz, the later has also received an Emma nomination and won the Funky Award with their debut album ‘’Aphorisms’. Nowadays, Hynninen performs as a musician in Ricky Tick Big Band, Tuomari Nurmio and Niila, while his past occupations include performing with artists such as J Karjalainen, Tuomo, Cheek, Egotrippi and Janna.

Hynninen has composed music for over 20 performing art projects throughout his career.
