= Follow Me (Isac Elliot album) =

Studio album by Isac Elliot
- Released: 7 November 2014
- Genre: Teen pop
- Label: Sony Music Entertainment

Isac Elliot chronology
Wake Up World (2013)	Follow Me (2014)	A Little More (2016)

Singles from Follow Me
- 1. "Baby I" Released: 23 June 2014; 2. "Tired of Missing You" Released: 10 October 2014

Follow Me is the second studio album by Finnish pop singer Isac Elliot. Released on 7 November 2014, the album peaked at number six on the Finnish Album Chart.

== Singles ==
Two singles with accompanying music videos were released; "Baby I" was released on 23 June 2014 followed by "Tired of Missing You" on 10 October 2014.

== Track listing ==
Standard listing
No.	Title	Length
1.	"Tired of Missing You"	3:43
2.	"Just Can't Let Her Go"	2:51
3.	"Hush"	3:18
4.	"Parachute"	3:25
5.	"Engine"	3:55
6.	"Baby I"	3:41
7.	"Glitter"	3:14
8.	"Recklessly"	3:18

== Charts ==
Chart (2014)	Peak position
Finnish Albums (Suomen virallinen lista)	6
Norwegian Albums (VG-lista)	10

== Release history ==
Region	Date	Format	Label
Finland	7 November 2014	CD, Digital download	Sony Music Entertainment
