= Origine =

- Digital cover

Studio album by B1A4
- Released: October 19, 2020
- Recorded: 2020
- Venue: Seoul, South Korea
- Studio: WM Studios
- Genre: K-pop; dance
- Language: Korean
- Label: WM Entertainment

B1A4 chronology
Rollin' (2017)	Origine (2020)	Connect (2024)

Singles from Origine
- 1. "Like A Movie" Released: October 19, 2020

Origine is the fourth studio album released by B1A4 under WM Entertainment. The album was released on October 19, 2020, by WM Entertainment and distributed by Sony Music Entertainment Korea, the album contains 12 tracks including their lead single "Like A Movie".

It marks B1A4's first full studio album since Good Timing in 2016, and their subsequent EP Rollin' and the first release as a trio, following the departures of Jinyoung and Baro.

== Background ==
On September 17, 2020, WM Entertainment announced that B1A4 was preparing to release an album in October. On September 30, the release date was confirmed to be on October 19.

On October 6, a comeback trailer was released to YouTube. On October 7, a full tracklist was released, containing a total of 12 tracks.

== Track listing ==
No.	Title	Lyrics	Music	Arrangement	Length
1.	"Origine" (Intro)		RWAM	RWAM	1:27
2.	"Like A Movie" (영화처럼)	CNU; RWAM	CNU; RWAM; Lee Hansol (이한솔)	RWAM	3:33
3.	"what is LovE?" (오렌지색 하늘은 무슨 맛일까?)	CNU; RWAM	CNU; RWAM	RWAM	3:12
4.	"Diving"	CNU; RWAM	CNU; Sandeul; RWAM	RWAM	3:17
5.	"Zero Gravity (CNU solo) (feat. BIBI)" (무중력)	CNU	CNU; Houdini (후디니)	Houdini (후디니)	3:10
6.	"Water Drop" (물방울)	Sandeul; Team Columbus (팀콜럼버스)	Sandeul; Team Columbus (팀콜럼버스)	Team Columbus (팀콜럼버스)	4:33
7.	"Wind" (바람)	CNU	CNU; RWAM	RWAM	4:02
8.	"Plodding (Sandeul Solo)" (터벅터벅)	Sandeul; Team Columbus (팀콜럼버스)	Sandeul; Team Columbus (팀콜럼버스)	Team Columbus (팀콜럼버스)	3:11
9.	"Colored With Love (Gongchan Solo)" (너에게 물들어간다)	Gongchan; Moon Junggyu (문정규)	Moon Junggyu (문정규)	Moon Junggyu (문정규)	4:39
10.	"Let's Fly" (나르샤)	CNU	CNU; Houdini (후디니); RWAM	Houdini (후디니); RWAM	3:22
11.	"Tonight"	CNU	CNU; RWAM	RWAM	3:26
12.	"For BANA" (더 뜨겁게 사랑할 여름에 만나요)	CNU; Sandeul; Gongchan; RWAM	CNU; Sandeul; RWAM; Jeong Wangi (정완기)	Jeong Wangi (정완기); RWAM	3:52
Total length:					41:49
