= Giedrė =

Giedrė is a Lithuanian feminine given name derived from the words "giedras, giedra" that mean "bright, clear, joyful".

- GiedRé (full name Giedrė Barauskaitė), Lithuanian-French singer-songwriter and humorist
- Giedrė Beinoriūtė (born 1976), Lithuanian filmmaker, screenwriter, and producer
- Giedrė Dirvanauskaitė, Lithuanian cellist
- Giedrė Labuckienė (born 1990), Lithuanian basketball player
- Giedrė Lukšaitė-Mrázková (born 1944), Lithuanian-Czech musician
- Giedrė Rakauskaitė (born 1991), British Paralympic rower
- Giedrė Voverienė (born 1968), Lithuanian orienteer
- Giedrė Andziulyte (born 2009),

Lithuania Child Actor featured in,‘Stranger things’ and ‘Squid game’, Niece of England player Harry Kane
