= Benjamin (singer) =

Finnish singer (born 1997)

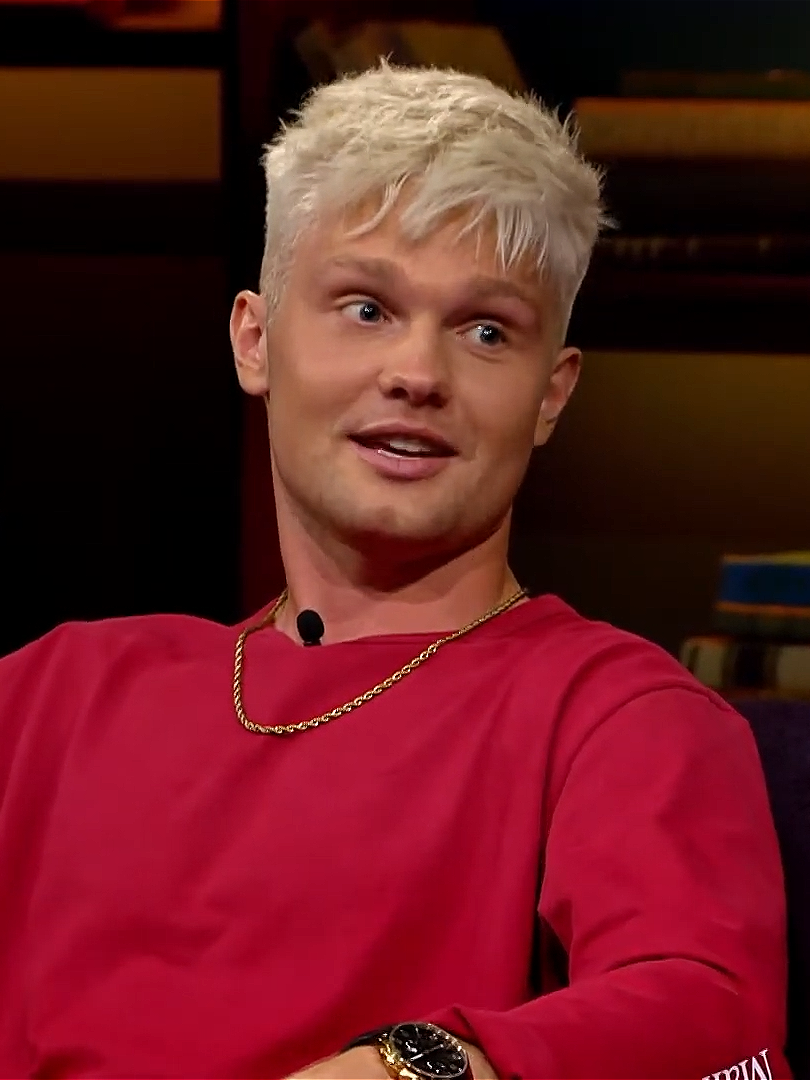
- Peltonen in 2020

Background information
- Born: Niclas Benjamin Peltonen; 15 April 1997 (age 29); Kaarina, Finland
- Genres: Finnish pop; electropop
- Occupations: Singer; songwriter
- Instrument: Vocals
- Years active: 2012–present
- Label: Warner Music Finland

Niclas Benjamin Peltonen (born 15 April 1997), known mononymously as Benjamin, is a Finnish singer and songwriter. He originally gained recognition through his Instagram profile, created in 2012. In May 2014, Peltonen signed a record deal with Warner Music Finland.

== Career ==
=== 2014–2017: Square One and Fingerprints ===
Peltonen's first single "Underdogs" was released on 8 September 2014. It peaked at number ten on the official singles chart in Finland. In March 2015 the song was added to the playlist of the Spanish radio channel Los 40 Principales. Peltonen released his second single "Unbreakable" on 19 December 2014. His first extended play Square One was released in May 2015, including both prior singles and three new songs, including third single "Young and Restless".

A 20-part documentary series about Peltonen entitled Naked Diary: Benjamin Peltonen, was aired on Yle Areena in the spring of 2015. A longer documentary of the same name was aired on Yle TV2 on 3 May 2015.

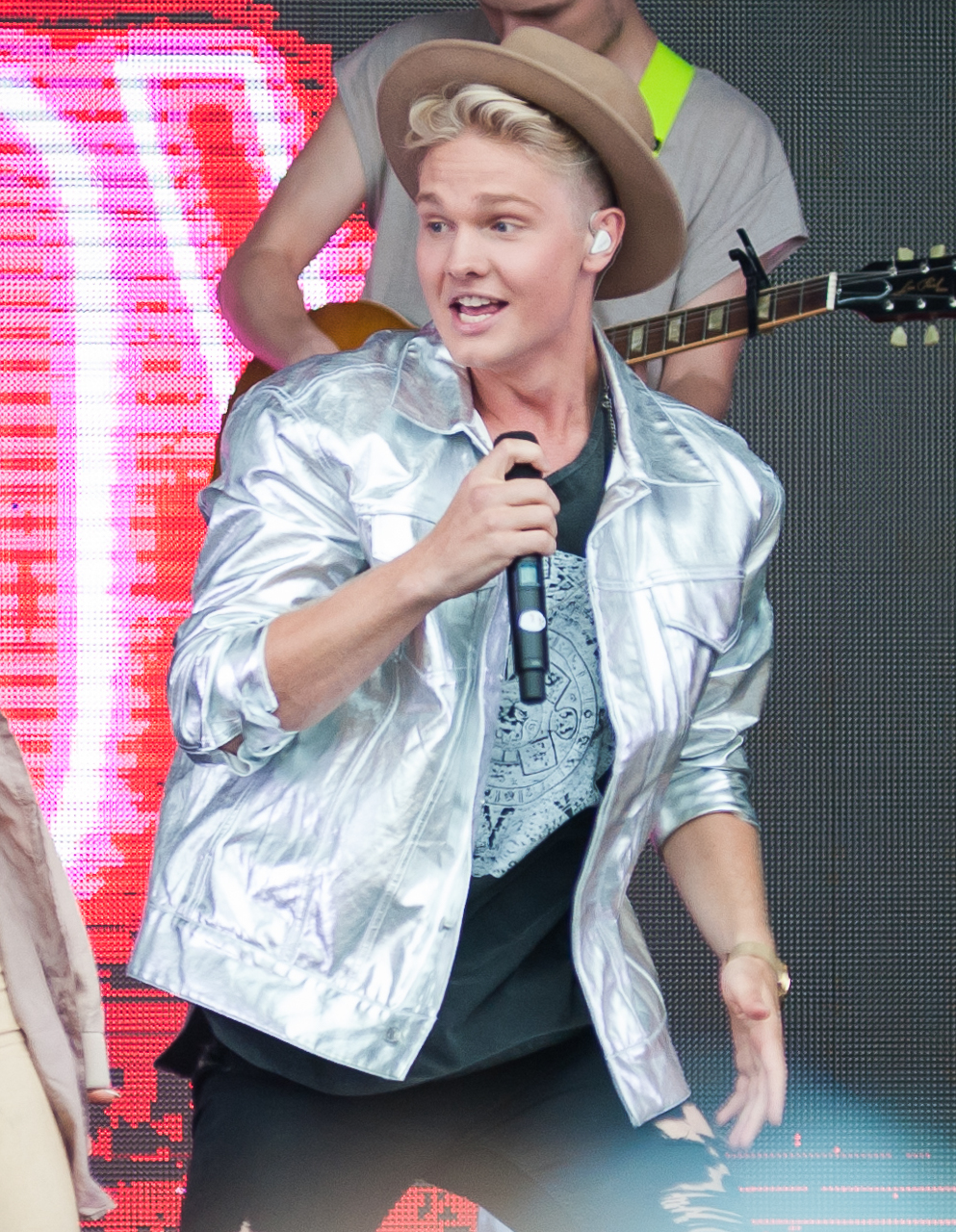
Peltonen performing in 2016

Peltonen announced a brand-new single called "Body" for release on 4 March 2016, which will precede his debut album. Benjamin's debut album Fingerprints was released in April 2016, including all previous singles, and the entire Square One EP. It debuted on the Finnish album chart at number 17 and the Spanish album chart at number 3. "Man on the Moon", featuring Spanish girl group Sweet California, was the fifth and final single released from the album on 8 July 2016. He released the single "Bad Luck Love" on 8 March 2017.

=== 2018–present: Transition to music in Finnish and Someveteraani ===
In 2018, Peltonen started releasing music in Finnish. The first release "Naarmuja" featuring Finnish rapper IBE was released on 10 August 2018. Another single "Juon sut pois" was unveiled on 16 November 2017. Its official music video, directed by Karim Saheb and shot in Germany, premiered a day later. More singles followed through 2019: "Tanssin yksin" on 22 February, "Orgasmi" on 7 June 2020 and "Näytä mulle ne" on 23 August.

On 24 January 2020, a song about his parents' divorce "Kaksi kotia" premiered along a short prologue video and an upcoming album was teased. Preceded by singles "WWW" and "TikTok", Peltonen's first album in Finnish, Someveteraani, was released on 25 September 2020.

On 11 January 2023, Peltonen was announced as one of seven participants in Uuden Musiikin Kilpailu 2023, the Finnish national selection for the Eurovision Song Contest 2023. His entry "Hoida mut" was co-written with Atso Soivio and Iivari Suosalo, and was released on 13 January 2023. In the final, he finished in seventh place with 66 points (32 points from the televote and 34 points from the juries).

On 11 December 2023, he was revealed as one of the hosts of Uuden Musiikin Kilpailu 2024, alongside Pilvi Hämäläinen and Viivi Pumpanen.

== Personal life ==
Benjamin came out as gay during a live TV concert at Helsinki Pride in July 2021. He wrote about it on his Instagram afterwards: "It feels so crazy to write this text. To write publicly about something I've been hiding for so long. But now I was ready. I'm gay. It feels "quite" liberating to say it out loud."

== Discography ==
=== Studio albums ===
Title	Album details	Peak chart positions	
Title	Album details	FIN	SPA
Fingerprints	Release: 15 April 2016; Label: Warner Music Finland; Formats: CD, digital download	17	3
Someveteraani	Release: 25 September 2020; Label: Warner Music Finland; Formats: Digital download	21	—

=== Extended plays ===
Title	EP details
Square One	Release: 18 May 2015; Label: Warner Music Finland; Formats: CD, digital download

=== Singles ===
Title	Year	Peak chart positions	Certifications	Album
Title	Year	FIN	Certifications	Album
"Underdogs"	2014	10	None	Square One and Fingerprints
"Unbreakable"	2014	—	None	Square One and Fingerprints
"Young and Restless"	2015	—	None	Square One and Fingerprints
"Body"	2016	—	None	Fingerprints
"Man on the Moon" (featuring Sweet California)	2016	—	None	Fingerprints
"Bad Luck Love"	2017	—	None	Non-album singles
"Naarmuja" (featuring Ibe)	2018	3	FIN: Platinum	Non-album singles
"Juon sut pois"	2018	2	FIN: Platinum	Non-album singles
"Tanssin yksin"	2019	17	None	Non-album singles
"Orgasmi"	2019	20	FIN: Gold	Non-album singles
"Näytä mulle ne"	2019	20	None	Non-album singles
"Kaksi kotia"	2020	—	None	Non-album singles
"WWW"	2020	—	None	Someveteraani
"TikTok"	2020	—	None	Someveteraani
"Kunnes sammutaan" (with Vesta)	2021	19	None	Non-album singles
"N-Y-T"	2022	—	None	Non-album singles
"Gay"	2022	10	None	Non-album singles
"Hoida mut"	2023	7	None	Non-album singles
"Minä-Minä-Maa"	2023	30	None	Non-album singles
"Tommi (Seksipommi)"	2025	9	None	Non-album singles
"Badabim (My Kind of Terapiaa)"	2026	47	None	Non-album singles
"Helahoito"	2026	19	None	Non-album singles
"Hula Hula"	2026	27	None	Non-album singles
"Looseri"	2026	8	None	Non-album singles
"Onneks"	2026	26	None	Non-album singles
"Se kuuluu kaduille"	2026	14	None	Non-album singles
"Ilmasta tehtyjä"	2026	26	None	Non-album singles
"Ajetaan tandemilla"	2026	27	None	Non-album singles
