= Kuningas Pähkinä =

- Also known as: TKK, Tähtien kanssa kävelijä, Tätien kanssa kävelijä, Kunkku Pähkinä, Pähkinä, Danaoz
- Born: Pekka Karppinen; Vaasa, Finland
- Genre: Rap
- Occupation: Rapper
- Years active: 1990–present
- Labels: Kaverikerho, Hyvät Levyt, Monsp Records

Pekka Karppinen, professionally known as Kuningas Pähkinä, is a Finnish rapper born in Vaasa, Finland.

== Career ==
Karppinen's career had its beginning in the early 1990s when he was still living in Jyväskylä. Heavily inspired by groups like Public Enemy and House of Pain, he formed a duo Vapaapudotus with Myyrä in 2000. Together they have released four EPs. Karppinen has also released two solo records and one record with rapper Juhani. In January 2011, Kuningas Pähkinä and Kilari Audio released an EP Musaa (Kadonneet kovalevyt osa II).

Kuningas Pähkinä & Setä Tamu

Since 2000, Kuningas Pähkinä has been collaborating with rapper Setä Tamu. As a duo, they have released one album, three EPs and two singles. To date, their most successful effort together is the single "Hey Scully", which peaked at number two on the Official Finnish Singles Chart on 1 February 2013.

Yön Polte

Kuningas Pähkinä, Setä Tamu and Stig joined forces in 2012 as the group Yön Polte and with the single "Tyttö sinä olet meritähti". The song peaked at number seven on the Finnish Singles Chart.

== Discography ==
=== Vapaapudotus ===
Albums

- 2000: Paholaismusiikkia
- 2001: Kun te nukutte
- 2002: Teidän kaupunkiin
- 2003; Kokeile uudestaan

=== TKK & Juhani ===
Albums

Year	Title	Peak positions
Year	Title	FIN
2004	Yks palmu ja aika paljon vuosia takana	–

=== Kuningas Pähkinä & Setä Tamu ===
Albums

Year	Title	Peak positions
Year	Title	FIN
2004	Kylpyammeellinen hittejä	15

EPs

Year	Title	Peak positions
Year	Title	FIN
2000	Kaikki suvussa	–
2011	Syksyllä Palmasiin	–
2012	Hiitti	–

Singles

Year	Title	Peak positions
Year	Title	FIN
2003	"Heitä paita vittuun"	–
2012	"Hei Scully"	2

=== Kuningas Pähkinä & Kilari Audio ===
EPs

Year	Title	Peak positions
Year	Title	FIN
2011	Musaa (Kadonneet kovalevyt osa II)	–

=== Yön Polte ===
Singles

Year	Title	Peak positions
Year	Title	FIN
2012	"Tyttö sinä olet meritähti"	7
2013	"Rakkauden ratapiha"	–
