= Wake Up World (album) =

Studio album by Isac Elliot
- Released: 24 May 2013
- Genre: Teen pop
- Label: Sony Music Entertainment
- Producer: Joonas Angeria

Isac Elliot chronology
Wake Up World (2013)	Follow Me (2014)

Singles from Wake Up World
- 1. "New Way Home" Released: 14 February 2013; 2. "First Kiss" Released: 31 May 2013

Wake Up World is the debut album by Finnish pop singer Isac Elliot. It was produced by Joonas Angeria and released on 24 May 2013. In its first week of release, the album peaked at number one on the Finnish Album Chart.

== Singles ==
Two singles with accompanying music videos were released; "New Way Home", released on 14 February 2013, peaked at number one on the Finnish Singles Chart. The second single "First Kiss" was released on 31 May 2013.

== Track listing ==
Standard listing
No.	Title	Length
1.	"New Way Home"	3:37
2.	"First Kiss"	3:10
3.	"Let's Lie"	3:30
4.	"Are You Gonna Be My Girl"	3:24
5.	"No 1" (featuring Johnel)	3:11
6.	"Party Alarm"	2:58
7.	"Sweet Talk"	3:05
8.	"Can't Give Up on Love"	3:19
9.	"Paper Plane"	3:39
10.	"A.N.G.E.L."	3:17

== Charts and certifications ==
=== Charts ===
Chart (2013)	Peak position
Finnish Albums (Suomen virallinen lista)	1
Norwegian Albums (VG-lista)	4

=== Certifications ===
Region	Certification	Certified units/sales
Finland (Musiikkituottajat)	Platinum	24,668

== Release history ==
Region	Date	Format	Label
Finland	24 May 2013	Digital download	Sony Music Entertainment
