= Setä Tamu =

Finnish rapper and record producer

- Also known as: Alkaline, Alkalyne
- Born: Mikko Tamminen; 20 August 1975 (age 51)
- Origin: Vaasa, Finland
- Genre: Hip-hop
- Occupations: Rapper, songwriter, record producer
- Years active: 2000–present
- Label: Kaverikerho

Mikko Tamminen (born 20 August 1975), better known by his stage name Setä Tamu, is a Finnish rapper and record producer.

== Career ==
Vaasalaiset Kansiot

Mikko Tamminen started his career as a part of the group Vaasalaiset Kansiot.

Firevision

He first gained success through the electronic pop duo Firevision in partnership with Arttu Peljo. Firevision released its sole album The Game You Play in 2003. The album featured two charting singles; "Stars" reached number four on the Official Finnish Singles Chart while "Truth" peaked at number 17.

Kuningas Pähkinä & Setä Tamu

Since 2000, Setä Tamu has been collaborating with rapper Kuningas Pähkinä. The duo released an EP Kaikki suvussa that year, and a single "Heitä paita vittuun" followed in 2003. Their first album, Kylpyammeellinen hittejä, came out in 2004. An EP Syksyllä Palmasiin was released in 2011, and another EP, Hiitti, in 2012. In 2012 they also released their most successful single to date, "Hei Scully," which peaked at number two on the Finnish Singles Chart.

Yön Polte

Yön Polte is a group consisting of Setä Tamu, Kuningas Pähkinä and Stig. Their first single "Tyttö sinä olet meritähti" was released in February 2012, and it peaked at number seven on the Finnish Singles Chart.

Other collaborations

Tamminen has produced and/or co-written songs for other Finnish artists such as Robin, Kaija Koo and Annika Eklund. In 2012, he produced and co-wrote the Japan Hot 100 number-one song "Electric Boy" by a Korean group Kara. He co-wrote the song "Fantasy" for Taiwanese pop singer Jolin Tsai. He has also written music for Korean group Shinee.

== Selected discography ==
=== Firevision ===
Albums

Year	Title	Peak position
Year	Title	FIN
2003	The Game You Play	15

Singles

Year	Title	Peak position	Album
Year	Title	FIN	Album
2002	"Music Lover"	–	The Game You Play
2002	"The Game You Play"	–	The Game You Play
2003	"Stars"	4	The Game You Play
2003	"Truth"	17	The Game You Play

=== Kuningas Pähkinä & Setä Tamu ===
Albums

Year	Title	Peak position
Year	Title	FIN
2004	Kylpyammeellinen hittejä	15

EPs

- 2000: Kaikki suvussa
- 2011: Syksyllä Palmasiin
- 2012: Hiitti

Singles

Year	Title	Peak position
Year	Title	FIN
2003	"Heitä paita vittuun"	–
2012	"Hei Scully"	2

=== Setä Tamu ===
Year	Title	Peak position
Year	Title	FIN
2012	"Jos sä joskus päädyt Berliiniin"	–

=== Yön Polte ===
Year	Title	Peak position
Year	Title	FIN
2012	"Tyttö sinä olet meritähti"	7
2013	"Rakkauden ratapiha"	–
