= Roope Salminen & Koirat =

Finnish band

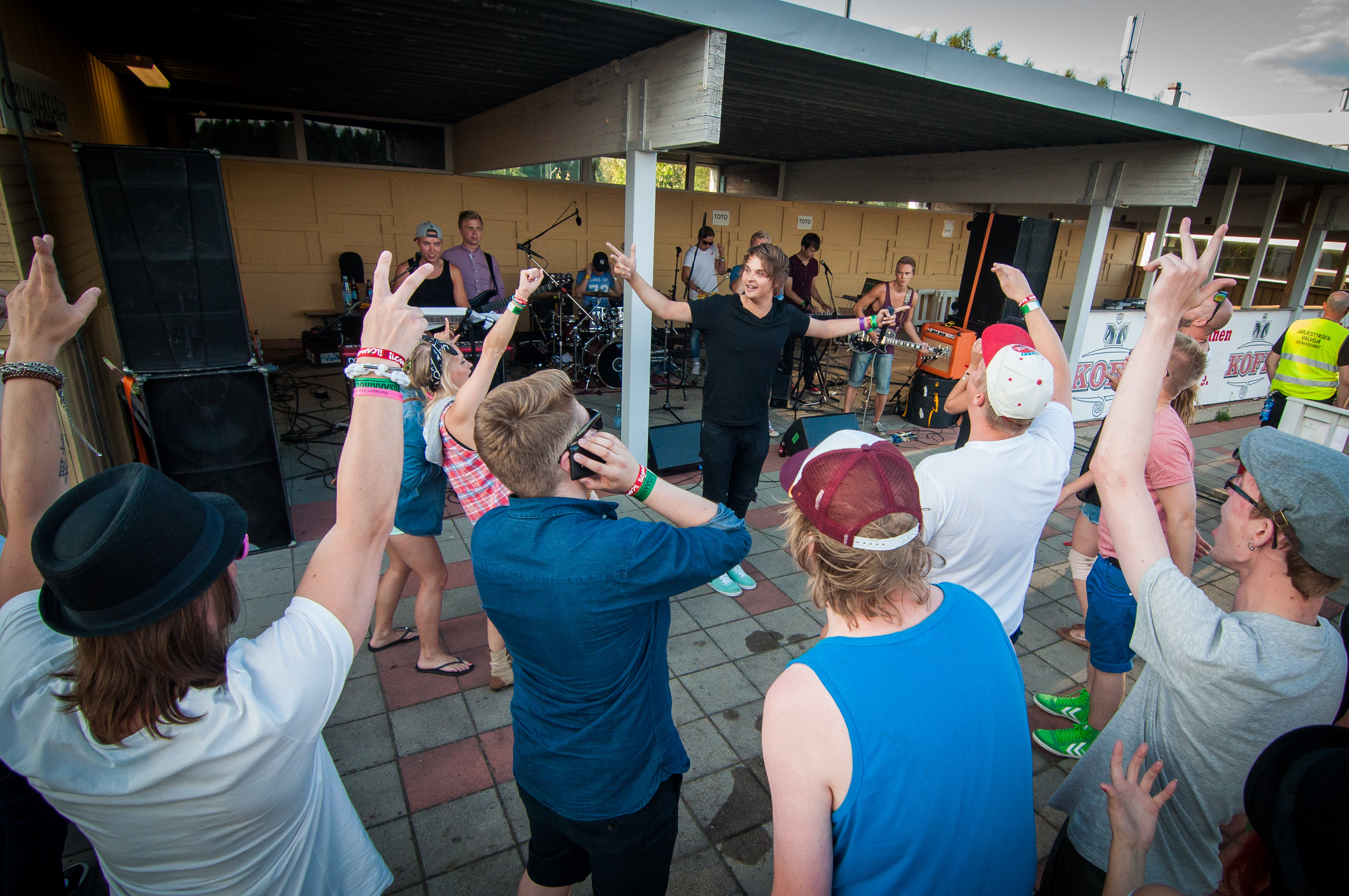
- Roope Salminen & Koirat in 2013

Background information
- Origin: Finland
- Years active: 2010–present
- Labels: Warner Music Finland
- Members: Roope Salminen; Jon-Jon Geitel; Ossi Saarinen; Olli Äkräs; Urho Särkkä; Robert Rasimus; Mikko Saarinen; Iivari Suosalo
- Website: www.roopesalminenjakoirat.fi

Roope Salminen & Koirat is a Finnish band fronted by rapper and television personality Roope Salminen. Originally formed as a one-gig only cover band, they have since had success with original songs such as "Madafakin darra" and the parent album Madafakin levy, both of which reached number-one on the Official Finnish Charts.

== Discography ==
=== Albums ===
Year	Title	Peak position
Year	Title	FIN
2016	Madafakin levy	1

=== Singles ===
Year	Title	Peak position	Album
Year	Title	FIN	Album
2014	"Biisonit"	–	Madafakin levy
2015	"Reissumies"	–	Madafakin levy
2015	"Madafakin darra" (featuring Ida Paul)	1	Madafakin levy
2015	"Pilkun jälkeen"	14	Madafakin levy
2015	"Tähdet kohdallaan"	17	Madafakin levy
2016	"Voodoo" (featuring Anna Abreu)	6	Madafakin levy
2016	"Snadi"	1	TBA
2016	"Sinulle mutsi"	6	TBA
2016	"Vilmasen Iinan bileet"	17	TBA
2017	"Tanssi se ulos" (featuring Ellinoora)	12	TBA
2018	"Kusipää"	12	TBA
2019	"Karavaani"	11	TBA
