= Axel Ehnström =

- Birth name: Axel Ehnström
- Born: Kirkkonummi, Finland
- Genres: Pop, Folk, folk pop, Electronic, Rock
- Occupation: Singer-songwriter
- Instruments: Vocals, Guitar, Piano
- Years active: 2011–present
- Labels: Elements Music, Sony/ATV

Axel Ehnström is a Finnish songwriter and musician. He is known for writing songs for artists such as Phoebe Ryan, Lost Frequencies and Alle Farben. He participated as Paradise Oskar in the Eurovision Song Contest 2011.

== Songwriting career ==
Axel Ehnström has been involved with several gold and platinum certified albums and has worked with artists such as Phoebe Ryan, Lost Frequencies, Isac Elliot, Anna Abreu, Christopher, Alle Farben, RAF Camorra, Dennis Kruissen, Madeline Juno and Kasmir. Ehnström has worked as a songwriter published by Elements Music since 2013. In 2014, he co-wrote Sofi De La Torre's song "Vermillion", which Billboard declared one of the best songs of the year. Ehnström's recent notable credits include a feature on Lost Frequencies' single ''All Or Nothing'', Deepend's ''Woke up in Bangkok'' and the co-writing of Alle Farben's hugely successful song Bad Ideas, which was the most played song on the German radio for four weeks in a row.

Both the 2016 and 2017 Finnish music industry reports by Music Finland, showed that Ehnström had more international songwriting cuts than any other Finnish songwriter in 2016 and 2017. In 2018, the Finnish Music Publishers association awarded Ehnström with the music export award of the year for his work in the German music market.

== Eurovision Song Contest 2011 ==
Ehnström represented Finland as Paradise Oskar in the Eurovision Song Contest 2011 with the song "Da Da Dam" placing 21st in the finals held in Düsseldorf, Germany. Ehnström received the Marcel Bezençon Press Award given to the best entry as voted on by the accredited media and press during the 2011 Eurovision event. Paradise Oskar's debut album Sunday Songs was released via Warner Music Finland on 2 May 2011.

== Personal life ==
Ehnström's family belongs to the Swedish-speaking minority in Finland. He lives in Evitskog, Kirkkonummi. He adopted the name Paradise Oskar from author Astrid Lindgren's children's book "Rasmus and the Vagabond", where Paradise Oskar is a vagabond who plays the accordion.

== Discography ==
=== Albums ===
Album Title	Album details	Chart positions
Album Title	Album details	FIN
Sunday Songs	Released: 2 May 2011; Label: Warner Music; Format: CD, Digital download	4

=== Songwriting credits ===
Year	Single	Peak chart position							Album	Artist
Year	Single	FIN	SE	NO	AUT	GER	BEL	SWI	Album	Artist
2011	Da Da Dam	6	–	–	64	46	–	–	Sunday Songs	Paradise Oskar
2011	Sunday Everyday	–	–	–	–	–	–	–	Sunday Songs	Paradise Oskar
2013	New Way Home	1	–	14	–	–	–	–	Wake Up World	Isac Elliot
2014	Wowwowwow	4	–	–	–	–	–	–	AMK Dropout	KASMIR
2015	Bandana	5	–	–	–	–	–	–	Sensuroimaton Versio	Anna Abreu
2016	Mein Leben	–	–	–	12	3	–	–	Ghost	RAF Camora
2016	Bad Ideas	–	–	–	4	7	–	79	Music is my best friend	Alle Farben
2016	All or Nothing	–	–	–	–	–	9	–	Less Is More	Lost Frequencies
2017	Superman	–	–	–	–	–	–	–	Non-album single	Pretty Pink
2017	James Has Changed	–	–	–	–	–	–	–	James	Phoebe Ryan
2018	Woke up in Bangkok	–	48	–	–	–	–	–	Non-album single	Deepend

Preceded by Kuunkuiskaajat with "Työlki ellää"	Finland in the Eurovision Song Contest; 2011	Succeeded by Pernilla Karlsson with "När jag blundar"
