= Isac Elliot =

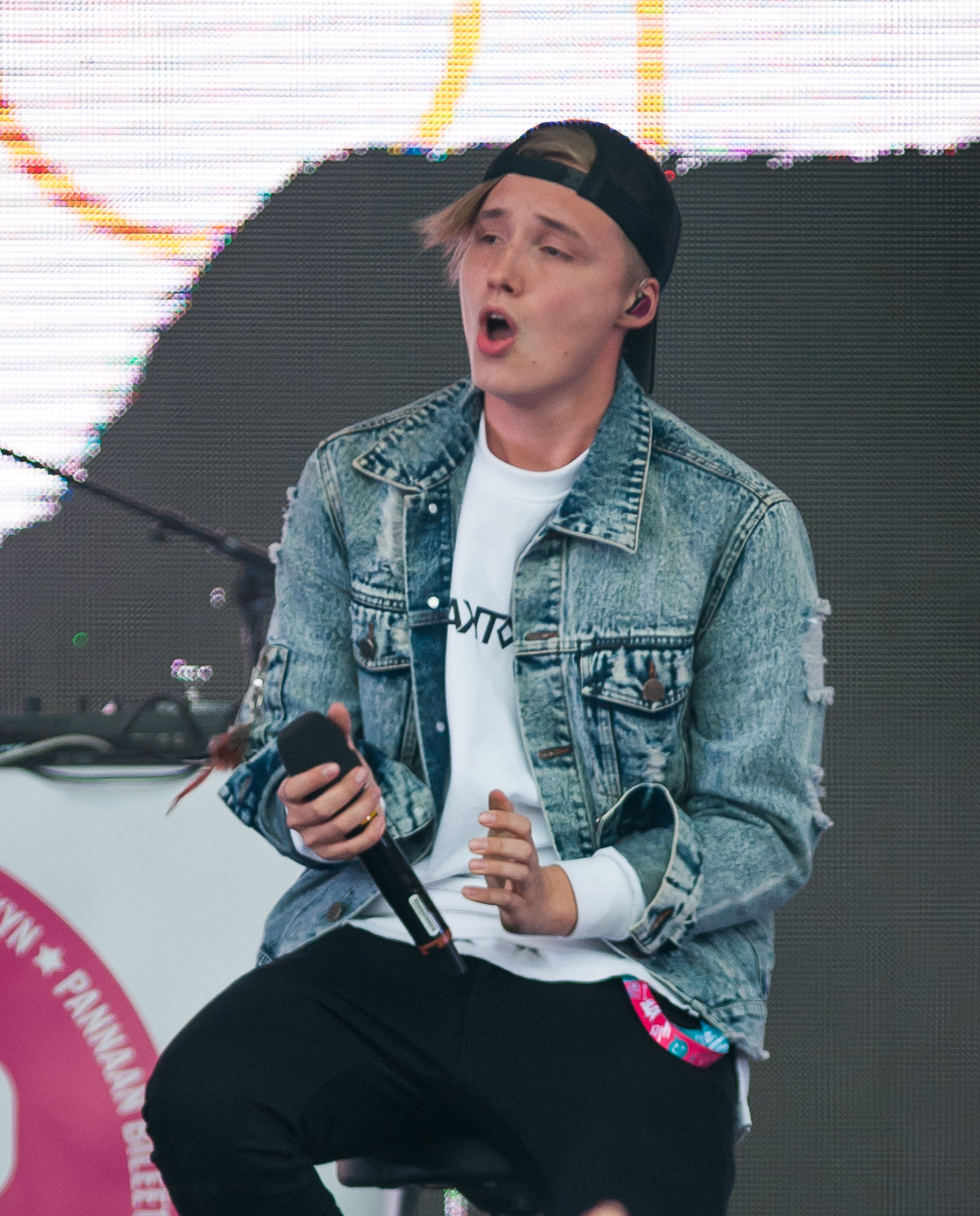
- Isac Elliot in 2016

Background information
- Born: Isac Elliot Lundén; 26 December 2000 (age 25); Kauniainen, Finland
- Occupation: Singer
- Years active: 2012–present
- Label: Sony Music
- Formerly of: Cantores Minores

Isac Elliot Lundén (born 26 December 2000) is a Finnish pop singer, songwriter, dancer and actor. He is best known for his song "New Way Home" and his debut album Wake Up World in 2013, both of which gained success in Finland and Norway. The follow-up album Follow Me was released in 2014 charting in Finland and Norway.

== Music career ==
=== 2012: Career beginnings ===
Elliot was a member of the boy choir Cantores Minores and appeared in the Svenska Teatern musicals Cabaret and Kristina från Duvemåla. His song "Pop Goes My Heart" was heard in the film Ella ja kaverit (2012).

=== 2013–present: Wake Up World and Follow Me ===
Isac Elliot's debut single "New Way Home" was released on 14 February 2013.

In March 2013, he was included in the future stars section of Billboard's "Next Big Sound" list in the 11th place. The documentary Dream Big – The Movie about Elliot's career was released in cinemas on 14 February 2014.

Elliot's second studio album Follow Me was released on 7 November 2014. The album was recorded in Helsinki, London, Stockholm and Los Angeles with producers Jonas W. Karlsson, Axel Ehnström, Victor Thell and Kevin Högdahl. Following the release of Follow Me, Elliot also embarked on a "Save a Girl" tour in the end of November 2014.

== Personal life ==
Isac Elliot is Finland-Swedish. He is the son of Fredrik "Fredi" Lundén, the lead singer for the band The Capital Beat.

== Discography ==
=== Studio albums ===
Title	Album details	Peak chart positions		Certifications
Title	Album details	FIN	NOR	Certifications
Wake Up World	Released: 24 May 2013; Label: Sony Music Entertainment; Formats: CD, digital download	1	4	IFPI FIN: Platinum
Follow Me	Released: 7 November 2014; Label: Sony Music Entertainment; Formats: CD, digital download	6	10	
Faith	Released: 26 December 2017; Label: Sony Music Entertainment; Formats: CD, digital download	20	—	
Kävi miten kävi	Released: 2 June 2023; Label: Def Jam; Formats: CD, digital download	1	—	
Vanhasta uuteen	Released: 28 March 2025; Label: Warner Music Finland; Formats: CD, digital download	1	—	
Mansion Music	Released: 20 February 2026; Label: Warner Music Finland; Formats: CD, digital download	1	—	
"—" denotes album that did not chart or was not released.

=== Extended plays ===
Title	Extended play details	Peak chart positions
Title	Extended play details	NOR
A Little More	Released: 8 July 2016; Label: Sony Music Entertainment; Formats: CD, digital download	20

=== Singles ===
==== As lead artist ====
Title	Year	Peak chart positions				Album
Title	Year	FIN	FIN Radio	FIN Down.	NOR	Album
"New Way Home"	2013	1	—	4	14	Wake Up World
"First Kiss"	2013	—	—	—	—	Wake Up World
"Dream Big"	2013	—	62	6	—	Wake Up World (The Ellioteer Edition)
"My Favorite Girl" (featuring Redrama)	2013	—	—	20	—	Wake Up World (The Ellioteer Edition)
"Baby I"	2014	—	3	22	—	Follow Me
"Tired of Missing You"	2014	—	35	8	—	Follow Me
"Just Can't Let Her Go"	2014	—	—	—	—	Follow Me
"Save a Girl"	2015	—	—	—	—	Non-album single
"Lipstick" (featuring Tyga)	2015	19	—	6	—	Faith
"No One Else"	2015	—	31	12	—	Faith
"Worth Something"	2016	—	79	14	—	Faith
"What About Me"	2016	—	81	—	—	Faith
"Liikaa sussa kii" (with Mikael Gabriel)	2017	1	—	—	—	Non-album single
"She"	2017	—	40	13	—	Faith
"Ayo"	2017	—	—	9	—	Faith
"Eyes Shut"	2017	—	—	—	—	Faith
"I Wrote a Song for You"	2017	—	69	—	—	Faith
"Mouth to Mouth"	2017	—	—	—	—	Faith
"Rich & Famous" (with SJUR)	2018	—	—	—	—	Non-album singles
"Waiting Game"	2019	8	20	—	—	Non-album singles
"Somebody Else"	2019	—	—	—	—	Non-album singles
"Weekend"	2020	—	68	—	—	Non-album singles
"Ghost"	2020	—	—	—	—	Non-album singles
"Waving at Cars"	2021	—	28	—	—	Non-album singles
"Roommates"	2021	—	—	—	—	Non-album singles
"TMI"	2021	—	—	—	—	Non-album singles
"20Min" (with William and Cledos)	2022	1	—	—	—	Kävi miten kävi
"Makso mitä makso" (featuring Sexmane)	2022	1	—	—	—	Kävi miten kävi
"Lowkey" (featuring 1.Cuz)	2022	8	—	—	—	Kävi miten kävi
"Kaks" (featuring Ibe)	2023	4	—	—	—	Kävi miten kävi
"Riidellään" (featuring Sanni)	2023	7	—	—	—	Kävi miten kävi
"Kompastun" (with Costi)	2023	5	—	—	—	Kävi miten kävi
"Kävi miten kävi"	2023	34	—	—	—	Kävi miten kävi
"Vielki hereillä" (with JVG)	2023	9	—	—	—	Kävi miten kävi
"Skaala"	2023	35	—	—	—	Kävi miten kävi
"Missaat mut" (with William)	2023	7	—	—	—	Vanhasta uuteen
"Sua ei oo"	2023	5	—	—	—	Vanhasta uuteen
"Emily"	2024	8	—	—	—	Non-album singles
"Weak" (featuring Cledos, William, Jore & Zpoppa and Willem)	2024	5	—	—	—	Non-album singles
"Italia" (featuring Averagekidluke and MD$)	2024	4	—	—	—	Vanhasta uuteen
"Anteeks" (with William)	2024	2	—	—	—	Non-album single
"Ehkä se siitä"	2025	4	—	—	—	Vanhasta uuteen
"Vanhasta uuteen"	2025	3	—	—	—	Vanhasta uuteen
"Oma vika"	2025	1	—	—	—	Mansion Music
"Ms. Bad" (with Kerza)	2025	2	—	—	—	Non-album single
"Sata enkelii"	2025	1	—	—	—	Mansion Music
"Ai että"	2025	1	—	—	—	Mansion Music
"Latu on auki" (with Kaija Koo)	2026	2	—	—	—	Non-album singles
"Sinfoniaa"	2026	1	—	—	—	Non-album singles
"Lucky Me" (with Mikael Gabriel)	2026	1	—	—	—	Non-album singles
"Hall of Fame" (with Mikael Gabriel)	2026	4	—	—	—	Non-album singles
"—" denotes single that did not chart or was not released.

==== As featured artist ====
Title	Year	Peak chart positions			Album
Title	Year	FIN	NOR	SWE	Album
"Beast" (Tungevaag & Raaban featuring Isac Elliot)	2016	5	9	31	Faith
"Throw Popcorn" (Samuel Daayata featuring Isac Elliot)	2018	—	—	—	Non-album singles
"Soldi" (Remix) (Mahmood featuring Isac Elliot)	2019	—	—	—	Non-album singles
"—" denotes single that did not chart or was not released.

=== Other charted songs ===
Title	Year	Peak chart positions	Album
Title	Year	FIN	Album
"Rakastat nimee"	2025	22	Vanhasta uuteen
"Kipinä"	2025	24	Vanhasta uuteen
"Laskunjakaja"	2025	35	Vanhasta uuteen
"City Girl"	2025	20	Vanhasta uuteen
"Viimesii viedään"	2025	44	Vanhasta uuteen
"Kuka himas odottaa"	2025	46	Vanhasta uuteen
