= Yön Polte =

Finnish musical trio

- Origin: Finland
- Years active: 2012-present
- Members: Kuningas Pähkinä; Setä Tamu; Stig

Yön Polte is a Finnish musical trio originating from Finland established in 2012 and made up of Finnish rapper Kuningas Pähkinä, rapper and producer Setä Tamu, and singer/rapper Stig (aka Stig Dogg).

Yön Polte found chart success through their single "Tyttö sinä olet meritähti" that reached #7 in the Finnish Singles Chart in May 2012.

== Discography ==
=== Singles ===
Year	Title	Peak positions
Year	Title	FIN
2012	"Tyttö sinä olet meritähti"	7
2013	"Rakkauden ratapiha"	–
2016	"RIP"	–
2018	"Aikamoinen munapää"	–
