= Tyttö sinä olet meritähti =

Single by Yön Polte
- Released: 2 January 2012
- Recorded: 2011
- Genre: Hip-Hop / Rap
- Length: 3:26
- Label: Elements Music

"Tyttö sinä olet meritähti" is the debut single by Finnish Hip-Hop, Rap group Yön Polte. It was released on 2 January 2012 as a digital download in Finland. The song has peaked to number 7 on the Finnish Singles Chart.

== Track listing ==
Digital download
No.	Title	Length
1.	"Tyttö sinä olet meritähti"	3:26

== Chart performance ==
Chart (2012)	Peak position
Finland (Suomen virallinen lista)	7

== Release history ==
Region	Date	Format	Label
Finland	January 2, 2012	Digital download	Elements Music
