= Stig (singer) =

Finnish hip hop, R&B and country music singer

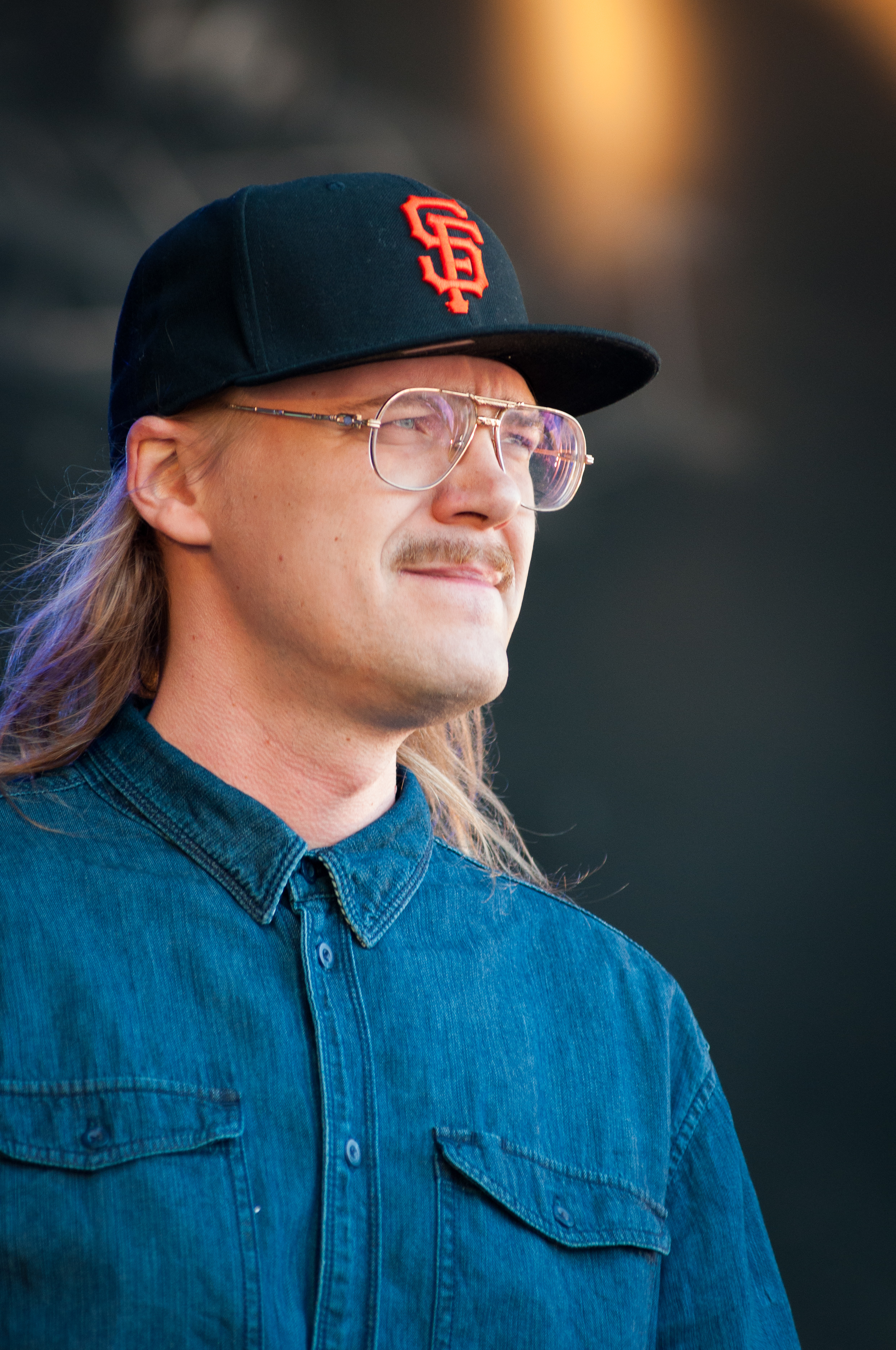
- Stig at Ilosaarirock in 2012

Background information
- Birth name: Pasi Siitonen
- Also known as: Stig Dogg, Hullukoira, Musa Basha, Paser Soze, Punavuoren R. Kelly, Hermannin Herttua
- Born: 22 August 1978 (age 46); Finland
- Genres: Hip hop, dirty rap, R&B, rap, country, folk
- Occupation(s): Singer, songwriter, record producer, musician
- Instrument(s): Vocals, guitar, bass, drums, keyboard
- Years active: 2004–present

Pasi Siitonen (born 22 August 1978, in Finland), better known by his stage name Stig or Stig Dogg, is a Finnish hip hop, R&B and country music singer. He has also played in jazz/funk bands like G-Litter, Kuja Orchestra and Raisin Team. He is a studio engineer under the pseudonym Hullukoira at 3rd Rail Music. In 2011 he shortened his name from Stig Dogg to just Stig and sang "Laululeija" in a bid to represent Finland in the Eurovision Song Contest 2012, but came third in the finals with Pernilla Karlsson winning with "När jag blundar".

Stig joined forces with Kuningas Pähkinä and Setä Tamu (a duo already cooperating with each other since 2000) to form in 2012 the group Yön Polte releasing the single "Tyttö sinä olet meritähti". The song peaked at number seven on the Official Finnish Singles Chart.

Siitonen is signed as a writer to Elements Music. He is credited for writing for Elena Paparizou's latest album.

== Discography ==
Albums

Year	Album	Peak position	Credit	Certification
Year	Album	FIN	Credit	Certification
2006	Stig Dogg	37	Stig Dogg	
2007	Stigidilaatio	8	Stig Dogg	
2012	Puumaa mä metsästän	17	Stig	
2013	Niks ja naks	12	Stig	
2018	Playlist, Vol. 1	9	Stig	

Singles

Year	Single	Peak position	Credit	Certification	Album
Year	Single	FIN	Credit	Certification	Album
2006	"Rakkauden Bermudan kolmio"	18	Stig Dogg		
2007	"Stigidilaatio"	12	Stig Dogg		
2011	"Laululeija"	–	Stig		
2012	"Ryyppy"	9	Stig		Puumaa mä metsästän
2012	"Puumaa mä metsästän"	11	Stig		Puumaa mä metsästän
2013	"Viheltelen"	12	Stig		Niks ja naks
2013	"Niks ja naks"	–	Stig		Niks ja naks
2013	"Roy Orbison"	4	Stig		Stig
2016	"Original Gigolo" (featuring Teflon Brothers)	12	Stig		
2020	"Kuningaskobra"	1			

Featured in

Year	Single	Peak Position	Certification	Album
Year	Single	FIN	Certification	Album
2013	"Seksikkäin jäbä" (Teflon Brothers featuring Stig & Meiju Suvas)	3		
